= 2007 in WEC =

World Extreme Cagefighting events

Information
- First date: January 20, 2007
- Last date: December 12, 2007

Events
- Total events: 7

Fights
- Total fights: 65
- Title fights: 14

Chronology
2006 in WEC	2007 in WEC	2008 in WEC

The year 2007 was the 7th year in the history of World Extreme Cagefighting, a mixed martial arts promotion based in the United States. In 2007 WEC held 7 events beginning with, WEC 25: McCullough vs. Cope.

== Title fights ==
Title fights in 2007
Weight class				Method	Round	Time	Event	Notes
Lightweight	Rob McCullough	def	Kit Cope	Submission (punches)	1	2:52	WEC 25: McCullough vs. Cope	(Note: For the Lightweight Championship.)
Featherweight	Urijah Faber (c)	def	Joe Pearson	Submission (strikes)	1	2:31	WEC 25: McCullough vs. Cope	(Note: For the Featherweight Championship.)
Welterweight	Carlos Condit	def	John Alessio	Technical Submission (rear naked choke)	2	4:59	WEC 26: Condit vs. Alessio	(Note: For the Welterweight Championship.)
Featherweight	Urijah Faber (c)	def	Dominick Cruz	Submission (guillotine choke)	1	1:38	WEC 26: Condit vs. Alessio	(Note: For the Featherweight Championship.)
Bantamweight	Chase Beebe	def	Eddie Wineland (c)	Decision (unanimous) (48-47, 48-46, 48-46)	5	5:00	WEC 26: Condit vs. Alessio	(Note: For the Bantamweight Championship.)
Light Heavyweight	Doug Marshall (c)	def	Justin McElfresh	KO (punches)	1	2:16	WEC 27: Marshall vs. McElfresh	(Note: For the Light Heavyweight Championship.)
Featherweight	Urijah Faber (c)	def	Chance Farrar	Submission (rear naked choke)	1	3:19	WEC 28: Faber vs. Farrar	(Note: For the Featherweight Championship.)
Welterweight	Carlos Condit (c)	def	Brock Larson	Submission (armbar)	1	2:21	WEC 29: Condit vs. Larson	(Note: For the Welterweight Championship.)
Middleweight	Paulo Filho	def	Joe Doerksen	TKO (strikes)	1	4:07	WEC 29: Condit vs. Larson	(Note: For the Middleweight Championship.)
Lightweight	Rob McCullough (c)	def	Richard Crunkilton	TKO (strikes)	1	1:29	WEC 30: McCullough vs. Crunkilton	(Note: For the Lightweight championship.)
Bantamweight	Chase Beebe (c)	def	Rani Yahya	Decision (unanimous) (49-46, 49-46, 49-45)	5	5:00	WEC 30: McCullough vs. Crunkilton	(Note: For the Bantamweight championship.)
Featherweight	Urijah Faber (c)	def	Jeff Curran	Submission (guillotine choke)	2	4:34	WEC 31: Faber vs. Curran	(Note: For the Featherweight Championship.)
Middleweight	Paulo Filho (c)	def	Chael Sonnen	Submission (armbar)	2	4:55	WEC 31: Faber vs. Curran	(Note: For the Middleweight Championship. Filho's victory was controversial because Sonnen did not appear to tap out, but yelled while the armbar was placed, and the referee took this as a verbal submission.)
Light Heavyweight	Doug Marshall (c)	def	Ariel Gandulla	Submission (armbar)	1	0:55	WEC 31: Faber vs. Curran	(Note: For the Light Heavyweight Championship.)

== Events list ==
No.	Event	Date	Venue	Location	Attendance
31	WEC 31: Faber vs. Curran	December 12, 2007	Hard Rock Hotel and Casino	Las Vegas, Nevada	
30	WEC 30: McCullough vs. Crunkilton	September 5, 2007	Hard Rock Hotel and Casino	Las Vegas, Nevada	
29	WEC 29: Condit vs. Larson	August 5, 2007	Hard Rock Hotel and Casino	Las Vegas, Nevada	
28	WEC 28: Faber vs. Farrar	June 3, 2007	Hard Rock Hotel and Casino	Las Vegas, Nevada	
27	WEC 27: Marshall vs. McElfresh	May 12, 2007	Hard Rock Hotel and Casino	Las Vegas, Nevada	
26	WEC 26: Condit vs. Alessio	March 24, 2007	Hard Rock Hotel and Casino	Las Vegas, Nevada	1,819
25	WEC 25: McCullough vs. Cope	January 20, 2007	Hard Rock Hotel and Casino	Las Vegas, Nevada	

== WEC 25: McCullough vs. Cope ==
WEC 25: McCullough vs. Cope was an event held on January 20, 2007, at the Hard Rock Hotel and Casino in Las Vegas, Nevada.

=== Results ===
Main card
Weight class				Method	Round	Time	Notes
Lightweight	Rob McCullough	def	Kit Cope	TKO (Submission to punches)	1	2:52	(Note: For the Lightweight Championship.)
Featherweight	Urijah Faber (c)	def	Joe Pearson	TKO (Submission to strikes)	1	2:31	(Note: For the Featherweight Championship.)
Welterweight	John Alessio	def	Brian Gassaway	Submission (rear naked choke)	1	4:50
Middleweight	Logan Clark	def	Blas Avena	TKO (elbows)	3	4:23
Preliminary card
Middleweight	Brendan Seguin	def	Fernando Gonzalez	Decision (unanimous) (30-27, 30-27, 30-27)	3	5:00
Welterweight	Alex Karalexis	def	Olaf Alfonso	TKO (punches)	2	3:53
Welterweight	Carlos Condit	def	Kyle Jensen	Submission (rear naked choke)	1	2:10
Bantamweight	Antonio Banuelos	def	Mike French	Decision (unanimous) (30-27, 30-27, 30-27)	3	5:00
Lightweight	Richard Crunkilton	def	Mike Joy	Submission (anaconda choke)	3	4:23

== WEC 26: Condit vs. Alessio ==
WEC 26: Condit vs. Alessio
- Promotion: World Extreme Cagefighting
- Date: March 24, 2007
- Venue: Hard Rock Hotel and Casino
- City: Las Vegas, Nevada

Event chronology
WEC 25	WEC 26: Condit vs. Alessio	WEC 27

WEC 26: Condit vs. Alessio was an event held on March 24, 2007, at the Hard Rock Hotel and Casino in Las Vegas, Nevada.

=== Results ===
Main card
Weight class				Method	Round	Time	Notes
Welterweight	Carlos Condit	def	John Alessio	Submission (rear naked choke)	2	4:59	(Note: For the vacant WEC Welterweight Championship.)
Featherweight	Urijah Faber (c)	def	Dominick Cruz	Submission (guillotine choke)	1	1:38	(Note: For the WEC Featherweight Championship.)
Bantamweight	Chase Beebe	def	Eddie Wineland (c)	Decision (unanimous) (48–47, 48–46, 48–46)	5	5:00	(Note: For the WEC Bantamweight Championship.)
Welterweight	Brock Larson	def	Erik Apple	Submission (kimura)	1	3:43
Preliminary card
Welterweight	Dave Terrel	def	Tiki Ghosn	TKO (strikes)	2	1:46
Featherweight	Cub Swanson	def	Tommy Lee	Submission (guillotine choke)	1	3:17
Bantamweight	Charlie Valencia	def	Antonio Banuelos	KO (punch)	1	3:12
Welterweight	Alex Serdyukov	def	Scott Norton	Submission (guillotine choke)	2	0:57
Featherweight	Micah Miller	def	Jesse Moreng	Submission (triangle choke)	3	3:29
Light Heavyweight	Brian Stann	def	Steve Cantwell	TKO (strikes)	1	0:41

== WEC 27: Marshall vs. McElfresh ==
WEC 27: Marshall vs. McElfresh was an event held on May 12, 2007, at the Hard Rock Hotel and Casino in Las Vegas, Nevada.

=== Results ===
Main card
Weight class				Method	Round	Time	Notes
Light Heavyweight	Doug Marshall (c)	def	Justin McElfresh	KO (punches)	1	2:16	(Note: For the Light Heavyweight Championship.)
Middleweight	Jason Miller	def	Hiromitsu Miura	Decision (unanimous) (29–28, 29–28, 29–28)	3	5:00
Light Heavyweight	Ariel Gandulla	def	Gary Padilla	Decision (split) (29–28, 28–29, 29–28)	3	5:00
Lightweight	Sherron Leggett	def	Charlie Kohler	TKO (strikes)	2	2:25
Preliminary card
Lightweight	Marcus Hicks	def	Sergio Gomez	Submission (guillotine choke)	2	3:20
Welterweight	Tom Speer	def	Sidney Silva	KO (punches)	1	4:33
Featherweight	Manny Tapia	def	Brandon Foxworth	TKO (strikes)	2	3:17
Welterweight	Ed Ratcliff	def	Johnny Sampaio	TKO (knee injury)	1	1:31
Middleweight	Eric Schambari	def	Art Santore	Decision (unanimous) (29–28, 30–27, 30–27)	3	5:00

== WEC 28: Faber vs. Farrar ==
WEC 28: Faber vs. Farrar was an event held on June 3, 2007, at the Hard Rock Hotel and Casino in Las Vegas, Nevada.

=== Results ===
Main card
Weight class				Method	Round	Time	Notes
Featherweight	Urijah Faber (c)	def	Chance Farrar	Submission (rear naked choke)	1	3:19	(Note: For the Featherweight Championship.)
Featherweight	Rani Yahya	def	Mark Hominick	Submission (rear naked choke)	1	1:19
Lightweight	Alex Karalexis	def	Josh Smith	Decision (majority) (28–28, 29–27, 29–27)	3	5:00
Light Heavyweight	Brian Stann	def	Craig Zellner	TKO (punches)	1	4:57
Preliminary card
Welterweight	Brock Larson	def	Kevin Knabjian	TKO (punches)	1	0:27	(Note: Although preliminary, this bout aired on the live broadcast.)
Welterweight	John Alessio	def	Alex Serdyukov	Submission (guillotine choke)	1	1:17	(Note: Although preliminary, this bout aired on the live broadcast.)
Featherweight	Cub Swanson	def	Micah Miller	Decision (unanimous) (30–27, 30–27, 30–27)	3	5:00
Bantamweight	Brian Bowles	def	Charlie Valencia	Submission (rear naked choke)	2	2:50
Featherweight	Jeff Bedard	def	Mike French	Decision (unanimous) (30–27, 30–27, 30–27)	3	5:00

== WEC 29: Condit vs. Larson ==
WEC 29: Condit vs. Larson was an event held on August 5, 2007, at the Hard Rock Hotel and Casino in Las Vegas, Nevada.

=== Results ===
Main card
Weight class				Method	Round	Time	Notes
Welterweight	Carlos Condit (c)	def	Brock Larson	Submission (armbar)	1	2:21	(Note: For the Welterweight Championship.)
Middleweight	Paulo Filho	def	Joe Doerksen	TKO (strikes)	1	4:07	(Note: For the Middleweight Championship.)
Featherweight	Jeff Curran	def	Stephen Ledbetter	Decision (unanimous) (30–27, 29–28, 29–28)	3	5:00
Lightweight	Jamie Varner	def	Sherron Leggett	TKO (strikes)	1	4:08
Preliminary card
Middleweight	Hiromitsu Miura	def	Fernando Gonzalez	TKO (strikes)	2	3:35
Bantamweight	Antonio Banuelos	def	Justin Robbins	Decision (unanimous) (30–26, 30–27, 30–27)	3	5:00
Middleweight	Eric Schambari	def	Logan Clark	Decision (unanimous) (29–28, 29–28, 29–28)	3	5:00
Light Heavyweight	Steve Cantwell	def	Justin McElfresh	TKO (strikes)	1	0:47
Welterweight	Blas Avena	def	Tiki Ghosn	Submission (rear naked choke)	1	1:01	(Note: Although preliminary, this bout aired on the live broadcast.)

== WEC 30: McCullough vs. Crunkilton ==
WEC 30: McCullough vs. Crunkilton was an event held on September 5, 2007, at the Hard Rock Hotel and Casino in Las Vegas, Nevada.

=== Results ===
Main card
Weight class				Method	Round	Time	Notes
Lightweight	Rob McCullough (c)	def	Richard Crunkilton	TKO (strikes)	1	1:29	(Note: For the Lightweight championship.)
Bantamweight	Chase Beebe (c)	def	Rani Yahya	Decision (unanimous) (49–46, 49–46, 49–45)	5	5:00	(Note: For the Bantamweight championship.)
Light Heavyweight	Brian Stann	def	Jeremiah Billington	TKO (strikes)	1	3:07
Bantamweight	Miguel Torres	def	Jeff Bedard	Submission (triangle choke)	1	2:30
Preliminary card
Welterweight	John Alessio	def	Marcelo Brito	Decision (unanimous) (30–27, 30–27, 30–27)	3	5:00
Lightweight	Marcus Hicks	def	Scott McAfee	Submission (guillotine choke)	1	2:13
Middleweight	Bryan Baker	def	Jesse Forbes	TKO (strikes)	1	4:15	(Note: Although preliminary, this bout aired on the live broadcast.)
Lightweight	Donald Cerrone	def	Kenneth Alexander	Submission (triangle neck crank)	1	0:56	(Note: This was later overturned after Cerrone tested positive for a banned substance.)
Welterweight	Blas Avena	def	Joe Benoit	Submission (guillotine choke)	1	0:29	(Note: Although preliminary, this bout aired on the live broadcast.)
Bantamweight	Ian McCall	def	Coty Wheeler	TKO (strikes)	1	4:43

== WEC 31: Faber vs. Curran ==
WEC 31: Faber vs. Curran was an event held on December 12, 2007, at the Hard Rock Hotel and Casino in Las Vegas, Nevada.

=== Results ===
Main card
Weight class				Method	Round	Time	Notes
Featherweight	Urijah Faber (c)	def	Jeff Curran	Submission (guillotine choke)	2	4:34	(Note: For the Featherweight Championship.)
Middleweight	Paulo Filho (c)	def	Chael Sonnen	Submission (armbar)	2	4:55	(Note: For the Middleweight Championship. Filho's victory was controversial because Sonnen did not appear to tap out, but yelled while the armbar was placed, and the referee took this as a verbal submission.)
Light Heavyweight	Doug Marshall (c)	def	Ariel Gandulla	Submission (armbar)	1	0:55	(Note: For the Light Heavyweight Championship.)
Featherweight	Jens Pulver	def	Cub Swanson	Submission (anaconda choke)	1	0:35
Preliminary card
Welterweight	John Alessio	def	Todd Moore	Decision (unanimous) (30–27, 30–27, 29–28)	3	5:00
Middleweight	Bryan Baker	def	Eric Schambari	Decision (split) (29–28, 28–29, 29–28)	3	5:00
Lightweight	Ed Ratcliff	def	Alex Karalexis	TKO (strikes)	2	1:26
Bantamweight	Brian Bowles	def	Marcos Galvao	KO (punch)	2	2:09	(Note: This bout, although preliminary, appeared on the live broadcast.)
Bantamweight	Charlie Valencia	def	Ian McCall	Submission (guillotine choke)	1	3:19	(Note: This bout, although preliminary, appeared on the live broadcast.)

== See also ==
- World Extreme Cagefighting
- List of World Extreme Cagefighting champions
- List of WEC events
