= 2008 in WEC =

World Extreme Cagefighting events

Information
- First date: February 13, 2008
- Last date: December 3, 2008

Events
- Total events: 6

Fights
- Total fights: 61
- Title fights: 11

Chronology
2007 in WEC	2008 in WEC	2009 in WEC

The year 2008 was the 8th year in the history of World Extreme Cagefighting, a mixed martial arts promotion based in the United States. In 2008 WEC held 6 events beginning with, WEC 32: Condit vs. Prater.

== Title fights ==
Title fights in 2008
Weight class				Method	Round	Time	Event	Notes
Welterweight	Carlos Condit (c)	def.	Carlo Prater	Submission (guillotine choke)	1	3:48	WEC 32: Condit vs. Prater	(Note: For the Welterweight Championship.)
Lightweight	Jamie Varner	def.	Rob McCullough (c)	TKO (strikes)	3	2:54	WEC 32: Condit vs. Prater	(Note: For the Lightweight Championship.)
Bantamweight	Miguel Torres	def.	Chase Beebe (c)	Submission (guillotine choke)	1	3:59	WEC 32: Condit vs. Prater	(Note: For the Bantamweight Championship.)
Light Heavyweight	Brian Stann	def.	Doug Marshall (c)	KO (punches)	1	1:35	WEC 33: Marshall vs. Stann	(Note: For the Light Heavyweight Championship.)
Featherweight	Urijah Faber (c)	def.	Jens Pulver	Decision (unanimous) (50-45, 50-44, 50-44)	5	5:00	WEC 34: Faber vs. Pulver	(Note: For the Featherweight Championship.)
Bantamweight	Miguel Torres (c)	def.	Yoshiro Maeda	TKO (doctor stoppage)	3	5:00	WEC 34: Faber vs. Pulver	(Note: For the Bantamweight Championship.)
Welterweight	Carlos Condit (c)	def.	Hiromitsu Miura	TKO (strikes)	4	4:43	WEC 35: Condit vs. Miura	(Note: For the Welterweight Championship.)
Light Heavyweight	Steve Cantwell	def.	Brian Stann (c)	TKO (punches)	2	4:01	WEC 35: Condit vs. Miura	(Note: For the Light Heavyweight Championship.)
Lightweight	Jamie Varner (c)	def.	Marcus Hicks	TKO (punches)	1	2:08	WEC 35: Condit vs. Miura	(Note: For the Lightweight Championship.)
Featherweight	Mike Brown	def.	Urijah Faber (c)	TKO (punches)	1	2:23	WEC 36: Faber vs. Brown	(Note: For the Featherweight Championship.)
Bantamweight	Miguel Torres (c)	def.	Manny Tapia	TKO (punches)	2	3:04	WEC 37: Torres vs. Tapia	(Note: For the Bantamweight Championship.)

== Events list ==
No.	Event	Date	Venue	Location	Attendance
37	WEC 37: Torres vs. Tapia	December 3, 2008	Hard Rock Hotel and Casino	Las Vegas, Nevada	643
36	WEC 36: Faber vs. Brown	November 5, 2008	Seminole Hard Rock Hotel and Casino	Hollywood, Florida	5,227
35	WEC 35: Condit vs. Miura	August 3, 2008	Hard Rock Hotel and Casino	Las Vegas, Nevada	1,006
34	WEC 34: Faber vs. Pulver	June 1, 2008	ARCO Arena	Sacramento, California	12,682
33	WEC 33: Marshall vs. Stann	March 26, 2008	Hard Rock Hotel and Casino	Las Vegas, Nevada	
32	WEC 32: Condit vs. Prater	February 13, 2008	Santa Ana Star Center	Rio Rancho, New Mexico	4,648

== WEC 32: Condit vs. Prater ==
WEC 32: Condit vs. Prater was an event held on February 13, 2008 at the Santa Ana Star Center in Rio Rancho, New Mexico.

=== Results ===
Main card
Weight class				Method	Round	Time	Notes
Welterweight	Carlos Condit (c)	def.	Carlo Prater	Submission (guillotine choke)	1	3:48	(Note: For the Welterweight Championship.)
Lightweight	Jamie Varner	def	Rob McCullough (c)	TKO (strikes)	3	2:54	(Note: For the Lightweight Championship.)
Bantamweight	Miguel Torres	def	Chase Beebe (c)	Submission (guillotine choke)	1	3:59	(Note: For the Bantamweight Championship.)
Bantamweight	Manny Tapia	def	Antonio Banuelos	Decision (split) (28–29, 30–27, 29–28)	3	5:00	(Note: The fight was originally announced as a split draw, Banuelos being awarded the victory 29–28 on referee Cecil Peoples' scorecard, and the two others being 30–27 for Tapia and a 28–28 draw, though a scorecard error was realized, and corrected to the ultimate outcome of a split decision for Manny Tapia.)
Preliminary card
Featherweight	Micah Miller	def	Chance Farrar	TKO (punches)	1	1:39
Bantamweight	Yoshiro Maeda	def	Charlie Valencia	TKO (body kick)	1	2:29	(Note: Although preliminary, this bout aired on the live broadcast.)
Bantamweight	Damacio Page	def	Scott Jorgensen	Decision (unanimous) (30–27, 29–28, 29–28)	3	5:00
Bantamweight	Coty Wheeler	def	Del Hawkins	Submission (flying armbar)	2	1:57
Featherweight	Josh Grispi	def	Mark Hominick	Submission (rear naked choke)	1	2:55
Featherweight	Leonard Garcia	def	Hiroyuki Takaya	TKO (punches)	1	1:31	(Note: Although preliminary, this bout aired on the live broadcast.)

== WEC 33: Marshall vs. Stann ==
WEC 33: Marshall vs. Stann was an event held on March 26, 2008 at the Hard Rock Hotel and Casino in Las Vegas, Nevada.

=== Results ===
Main card
Weight class				Method	Round	Time	Notes
Light Heavyweight	Brian Stann	def.	Doug Marshall (c)	KO (punches)	1	1:35	(Note: For the Light Heavyweight Championship.)
Middleweight	Chael Sonnen	def	Bryan Baker	Decision (unanimous) (30-26, 30-25, 30-25)	3	5:00
Lightweight	Marcus Hicks	def	Ed Ratcliff	Submission (guillotine choke)	1	1:42
Light Heavyweight	Steve Cantwell	def	Tim McKenzie	Submission (rear-naked choke)	1	2:13
Preliminary card
Welterweight	Hiromitsu Miura	def	Blas Avena	KO (punches)	1	2:35
Welterweight	Brock Larson	def	John Alessio	Disqualification (illegal knee)	1	1:50
Lightweight	Richard Crunkilton	def	Sergio Gomez	Decision (unanimous) (30-26, 30-27, 29-28)	3	5:00
Welterweight	Alex Serdyukov	def	Ryan Stonitsch	Submission (triangle choke)	1	1:35
Bantamweight	Chris Manuel	vs.	Kenji Osawa	Draw (split) (28-29, 29-28, 28-28)	3	5:00
Middleweight	Logan Clark	def	Steve Harper	TKO (strikes)	1	4:37

== WEC 34: Faber vs. Pulver ==
WEC 34: Faber vs. Pulver was an event held on June 1, 2008 at ARCO Arena in Sacramento, California.

=== Results ===
Main card
Weight class				Method	Round	Time	Notes
Featherweight	Urijah Faber (c)	def.	Jens Pulver	Decision (unanimous) (50-45, 50-44, 50-44)	5	5:00	(Note: For the Featherweight Championship.)
Bantamweight	Miguel Torres (c)	def.	Yoshiro Maeda	TKO (doctor stoppage)	3	5:00	(Note: For the Bantamweight Championship.)
Light Heavyweight	Mark Muñoz	def	Chuck Grigsby	KO (punches)	1	4:15
Lightweight	Rob McCullough	def	Kenneth Alexander	Decision (split) (30-27, 28-29, 30-27)	3	5:00
Preliminary card
Lightweight	Donald Cerrone	def	Danny Castillo	Submission (armbar)	1	1:30
Featherweight	Mike Brown	def	Jeff Curran	Decision (unanimous) (30-27, 30-27, 30-27)	3	5:00
Bantamweight	Will Ribeiro	def	Chase Beebe	Decision (split) (29-28, 28-29, 29-28)	3	5:00
Middleweight	Tim McKenzie	def	Jeremy Lang	Submission (triangle choke)	3	0:40
Welterweight	Alex Serdyukov	def	Luis Santos	TKO (injury)	1	5:00
Featherweight	José Aldo	vs.	Alexandre Franca Nogueira	TKO (punches)	2	3:22
Bantamweight	Dominick Cruz	def	Charlie Valencia	Decision (unanimous) (30-27, 29-28, 29-28)	3	5:00

== WEC 35: Condit vs. Miura ==
WEC 35: Condit vs. Miura was an event held on August 3, 2008 at the Hard Rock Hotel and Casino in Las Vegas, Nevada.

=== Results ===
Main card
Weight class				Method	Round	Time	Notes
Welterweight	Carlos Condit (c)	def.	Hiromitsu Miura	TKO (strikes)	4	4:43	(Note: For the Welterweight Championship.)
Light Heavyweight	Steve Cantwell	def.	Brian Stann (c)	TKO (punches)	2	4:01	(Note: For the Light Heavyweight Championship.)
Lightweight	Jamie Varner (c)	def.	Marcus Hicks	TKO (punches)	1	2:08	(Note: For the Lightweight Championship.)
Bantamweight	Brian Bowles	def	Damacio Page	Submission (guillotine choke)	1	3:30
Preliminary card
Welterweight	Brock Larson	def	Carlo Prater	TKO (punches)	1	0:37
Welterweight	Blas Avena	def	Dave Terrel	TKO (punches)	1	1:07
Featherweight	Josh Grispi	def	Micah Miller	TKO (strikes)	0	0:50
Lightweight	Shane Roller	def	Todd Moore	Submission (guillotine choke)	1	3:00
Lightweight	Mike Budnik	vs.	Greg McIntyre	Submission (triangle choke)	3	3:21
Bantamweight	Scott Jorgensen	def	Kenji Osawa	Decision (unanimous) (30-27, 30-27, 30-27)	3	5:00

== WEC 36: Faber vs. Brown ==
WEC 36: Faber vs. Brown was an event held on November 5, 2008 at the Seminole Hard Rock Hotel and Casino in Hollywood, Florida.

=== Results ===
Main card
Weight class				Method	Round	Time	Notes
Featherweight	Mike Brown	def.	Urijah Faber (c)	TKO (punches)	1	2:23	(Note: For the Featherweight Championship.)
Catchweight (189 lb)	Chael Sonnen	def	Paulo Filho	Decision (unanimous) (30-27, 30-27, 30-27)	3	5:00	(Note: Filho was supposed to defend the Middleweight Championship, but missed weight by four pounds, forcing the bout to be a non-title catchweight bout.)
Featherweight	Leonard Garcia	def	Jens Pulver	TKO (punches)	1	1:12
Middleweight	Jake Rosholt	def	Nissen Osterneck	TKO (punches)	2	3:48
Preliminary card
Lightweight	Donald Cerrone	def	Rob McCullough	Decision (unanimous) (30-27, 29-28, 29-27)	3	5:00
Middleweight	Aaron Simpson	def	David Avellan	KO (punch)	1	0:18
Featherweight	José Aldo	def	Jonathan Brookins	TKO (strikes)	3	0:45
Light Heavyweight	Carmelo Marrero	def	Steve Steinbeiss	Decision (split) (29-28, 28-29, 29-28)	1	3:00
Lightweight	Danny Castillo	vs.	Rafael Dias	TKO (punches)	2	2:54
Catchweight (137 lb)	Rani Yahya	def	Yoshiro Maeda	Submission (guillotine choke)	1	3:30

== WEC 37: Torres vs. Tapia ==
WEC 37: Torres vs. Tapia was an event held on December 3, 2008 at the Hard Rock Hotel and Casino in Las Vegas, Nevada.

=== Results ===
Main card
Weight class				Method	Round	Time	Notes
Bantamweight	Miguel Torres (c)	def.	Manny Tapia	TKO (punches)	2	3:04	(Note: For the Bantamweight Championship.)
Featherweight	Wagnney Fabiano	def	Akitoshi Tamura	Submission (arm-triangle choke)	3	4:48
Bantamweight	Brian Bowles	def	Will Ribeiro	Submission (guillotine choke)	3	1:11
Bantamweight	Joseph Benavidez	def	Danny Martinez	Decision (unanimous) (30–27, 30–27, 30–27)	3	5:00
Preliminary card
Welterweight	Johny Hendricks	def	Justin Haskins	TKO (strikes)	2	0:43
Light Heavyweight	Mark Muñoz	def	Ricardo Barros	TKO (strikes)	1	2:26
Featherweight	Diego Nunes	def	Cole Province	Decision (unanimous) (30–27, 30–27, 29–28)	3	5:00
Lightweight	Bart Palaszewski	def	Alex Karalexis	TKO (punches)	2	1:11
Featherweight	Cub Swanson	def	Hiroyuki Takaya	Decision (unanimous) (30–27, 30–27, 29–28)	3	5:00
Lightweight	Shane Roller	def	Mike Budnik	Submission (guillotine choke)	1	1:01

== See also ==
- World Extreme Cagefighting
- List of World Extreme Cagefighting champions
- List of WEC events
