= Tiki Ghosn =

American mixed martial arts fighter

- Born: Khalil Ghosn; February 9, 1977 (age 49); Huntington Beach, California, U.S.
- Height: 5 ft 10 in (1.78 m)
- Weight: 171 lb (78 kg; 12.2 st)
- Division: Welterweight
- Reach: 70 in (178 cm)
- Stance: Orthodox
- Team: Huntington Beach Ultimate Training Center; Wolfslair MMA Academy

Mixed martial arts record
- Total: 18
- Wins: 10
- By knockout: 2
- By submission: 2
- By decision: 6
- Losses: 8
- By knockout: 3
- By submission: 4
- By decision: 1

Other information
- Mixed martial arts record from Sherdog

Khalil Ghosn, better known by his ringname Tiki Ghosn, is an American retired mixed martial artist, competing from 1998 to 2009 in the Welterweight division.

== History ==
Ghosn played football while attending Mater Dei High School in Santa Ana, California, where he played defensive back. Ghosn then attended Orange Coast College for a brief time. While playing football, he took up Muay Thai as a form of cross training and ultimately made the decision to pursue mixed martial arts and leave football.

Ghosn has competed in a number of MMA promotions including the Ultimate Fighting Championship, Strikeforce, World Fighting Alliance, King of the Cage and World Extreme Cagefighting. Ghosn is one of the three original members of Team Punishment, which included Tito Ortiz and Rob McCullough. He is also a training partner of former UFC Light Heavyweight Champion Quinton "Rampage" Jackson. Ghosn has made appearances as a guest coach on The Ultimate Fighter: Heavyweights as well as The Ultimate Fighter: Team Bisping vs. Team Miller.

Ghosn's most famous fight would be against future UFC Welterweight Champion Robbie Lawler at UFC 40. Ghosn was knocked out less than ninety seconds into the first round, and went on to falsely claim during the post-fight interview that the referee had stopped the fight due to a cut suffered by Ghosn.

Ghosn was managed by UFC President Dana White prior to White becoming president of the UFC. Ghosn is the founder and CEO of The Huntington Beach Ultimate Training Center which opened on January 1, 2001. Ghosn has worked with a number of fighters including Michael Bisping, B.J. Penn, Rob McCullough, Quinton Jackson, Tito Ortiz, Jason Miller, Ricco Rodriguez, Cheick Kongo, Joey Beltran, and Brandon Halsey.

Ghosn operates Arsenal Sports Agency, a management company that represents various athletes including Dustin Poirier, Aljamain Sterling, and Chael Sonnen, among others.

== Career accomplishments ==
=== Mixed martial arts ===
- Ultimate Fighting Championship
  - UFC Encyclopedia Awards
    - Fight of the Night (One time) vs. Bob Cook

== Mixed martial arts record ==
Professional record breakdown
18 matches	10 wins	8 losses
By knockout	2	4
By submission	2	3
By decision	6	1

Res.	Record	Opponent	Method	Event	Date	Round	Time	Location	Notes
Win	10–8	Brian Warren	Decision (unanimous)	Call to Arms I	May 16, 2009	3	5:00	Ontario, California, United States	
Win	9–8	Luke Stewart	Decision (unanimous)	Strikeforce: Shamrock vs. Le	March 29, 2008	3	5:00	San Jose, California, United States	
Loss	8–8	Blas Avena	Submission (rear-naked choke)	WEC 29	August 5, 2007	1	1:01	Las Vegas, Nevada, United States	
Loss	8–7	Dave Terrel	TKO (Punches)	WEC 26: Condit vs. Alessio	March 24, 2007	2	1:46	Las Vegas, Nevada, United States	
Loss	8–6	Pat Healy	TKO (shoulder injury)	WEC 19: Undisputed	March 17, 2006	3	0:25	Lemoore, California, United States	
Loss	8–5	Chris Lytle	Submission (bulldog choke)	UFC 47	April 2, 2004	2	1:55	Las Vegas, Nevada, United States	
Win	8–4	Nick Gilardi	Submission (guillotine choke)	WEC 9: Cold Blooded	January 16, 2004	1	4:52	Lemoore, California, United States	
Win	7–4	Ronald Jhun	Decision (split)	SuperBrawl 31	September 20, 2003	3	5:00	Honolulu, Hawaii, United States	
Loss	6–4	Robbie Lawler	KO (cut)	UFC 40	November 22, 2002	1	1:29	Las Vegas, Nevada, United States	
Win	6–3	Kit Cope	TKO (forfeit)	WFA 2: Level 2	July 5, 2002	2	5:00	Las Vegas, Nevada, United States	
Win	5–3	Steve Schelburn	TKO (knees and punches)	HFP 1: Rumble on the Reservation	March 30, 2002	1	2:35	Anza, California, United States	
Win	4–3	Paul Rodriguez	Decision (unanimous)	World Fighting Alliance 1	November 3, 2001	3	5:00	Las Vegas, Nevada, United States	
Loss	3–3	Sean Sherk	TKO (shoulder injury)	UFC 30	February 23, 2001	2	4:47	Atlantic City, New Jersey, United States	
Loss	3–2	Bob Cook	Submission (rear-naked choke)	UFC 24	March 10, 2000	2	1:29	Lake Charles, Louisiana, United States	
Win	3–1	Jason Maxwell	Decision (split)	KOTC 2 - Desert Storm	February 5, 2000	2	5:00	San Jacinto, California, United States	
Win	2–1	Phil Ensminger	Decision	West Coast NHB Championships 3	June 6, 1999	2	5:00	Los Angeles, California, United States	
Win	1–1	Doug Evans	Submission (guillotine choke)	West Coast NHB Championships 2	February 28, 1999	1	1:02	Compton, California, United States	
Loss	0–1	Genki Sudo	Decision (unanimous)	Extreme Shoot 2	June 6, 1998	3	5:00	Mission Viejo, California, United States	
