= World Fighting Alliance =

MMA promoter based in Las Vegas

- Type: Private
- Industry: Mixed martial arts promotion
- Founded: 2001
- Founder: John Lewis
- Defunct: 2006
- Successor: Ultimate Fighting Championship
- Headquarters: Las Vegas, Nevada, United States
- Key people: John Lewis, Promoter/Match Maker; John Huntington, Producer; Louie Palazzo, Investor
- Parent: TKO Group Holdings

The World Fighting Alliance (WFA) was a mixed martial arts organization based in the United States.

== History ==
Owned and organized by MMA legend and trainer John Lewis (Promoter/Match Maker) and nightclub operator and "Club Rubber" promoter John Huntington (Producer) along with Lawyer Louis Palazzo (Investor), the WFA began promoting events after the Nevada State Athletic Commission began sanctioning mixed martial arts. The Las Vegas-based promotion, unlike its cross-town rival, the Ultimate Fighting Championship, featured a nightclub environment and a slogan of “Where the fight club meets the Night Club”. Its events featured several scantily-clad ring girls between rounds and go-go dancers between fights, and plenty of loud music, including guest performers like Ice-T.

However, in an incident at Level 3 which seriously harmed the promotion's reputation, credentialed photographers were ejected by venue security from their areas and were forced to move to where they could not take acceptable pictures. The inconvenience caused by the ejection was substantial, some writers at the event were forced to track down their photographers and leave their beat, while some offended editors decided to yank coverage of the event altogether. While the difficulties of the last event did not seem to deter the promotion and the promoters promised a Level 4, Lewis and Huntington did not promote another WFA event since, and the promotion was assumed to be defunct.

After a rise of interest in mixed martial arts in the United States in 2005, the WFA reemerged with new ownership and began an aggressive program to establish itself as a new major mixed martial arts promotion. The owners, Ross Goodman and Louis Palazzo, both attorneys from Las Vegas, began by signing contracts with several of the biggest free agents on the market, including former UFC middleweight contender and Olympic silver medalist Matt Lindland, PRIDE middleweight contender Quinton Jackson, retired UFC and Pancrase champion Bas Rutten, former top-ranked Bantamweight fighter Urijah Faber, and former UFC Heavyweight Champion Ricco Rodriguez. In their recruitment efforts, they also came close to signing Tito Ortiz before he was enticed by an offer from the UFC.

The fruits of their acquisitions culminated in WFA: King of the Streets on July 22, 2006, a pay-per-view broadcast event at the Forum in Inglewood, California. The card was headed by a main event of Quinton Jackson vs. Matt Lindland, Jackson's first fight on American soil since becoming a headliner in PRIDE, and featured famed boxing broadcaster Barry Tompkins and wrestling star Bill Goldberg at the announce desk. Despite heavy expectations and an aggressive marketing campaign, including a pre-event special broadcast on Showtime, the event only attracted a crowd of over 5,000, with only 2,300 tickets sold. Pay-per-view buys were also low, reportedly under 50,000.

Despite the disappointing numbers, and rumors of financial troubles, the WFA announced their next event, WFA: King of the Streets II at Aladdin Resort and Casino in Las Vegas, Nevada, scheduled for December 9, 2006. However, the event was then postponed until early 2007 for undisclosed reasons. On November 15, 2006, the WFA's CEO, Jeremy Lappen, sued the WFA and its owners for breach of contract, claiming he has not been paid since June 2006, a few weeks before King of the Streets. Finally on December 11, 2006, Zuffa, the parent company of rival promotion UFC, announced it had acquired select assets of the WFA, including the contracts of WFA fighters. The WFA afterward ceased operations per the sale agreement.

The WFA brand was revived in THQ's video game UFC Undisputed 2010, an update to their wildly popular multi-platform MMA video game UFC 2009 Undisputed. In the game's career mode, which mimics that of an actual MMA fighter, players start off in the WFA and after a certain amount of success are invited to the UFC. The WFA made its video game return in EA's video game EA Sports UFC 3. The Brand was then again revived to appear in EA Sports UFC 4 in 2020. WFA also appears In EA Sports UFC 5 In 2023 and appears again in EA Sports UFC 6.

== Events ==
No.	Event	Date	Venue	Location
1	World Fighting Alliance 1	November 3, 2001	The Joint (Hard Rock Hotel)	Las Vegas, Nevada, United States
2	WFA 2: Level 2	July 5, 2002	The Joint (Hard Rock Hotel)	Las Vegas, Nevada, United States
3	WFA 3: Level 3	November 23, 2002	The Aladdin	Las Vegas, Nevada, United States
4	WFA: King of the Streets	July 22, 2006	Great Western Forum	Los Angeles, California, United States

=== World Fighting Alliance 1 ===
World Fighting Alliance 1
- Promotion: World Fighting Alliance
- Date: November 3, 2001
- Venue: The Joint
- City: Las Vegas, Nevada, United States

Event chronology
World Fighting Alliance 1	WFA 2: Level 2

World Fighting Alliance 1 was a mixed martial arts event held by World Fighting Alliance on November 3, 2001 at The Joint in Las Vegas, Nevada.

Results

Main card
Weight class				Method	Round	Time	Notes
Light Heavyweight	Rich Franklin	def.	Marvin Eastman	Submission (armbar)	1	1:02
Middleweight	Jermaine Andre	def.	Ronald Jhun	TKO (punches)	1	3:11
Welterweight	Antonio McKee	vs.	Jason Black	Draw (split)	3	5:00
Featherweight	João Roque	def.	Stephen Palling	Submission (armbar)	1	1:29
Welterweight	Tony DeSouza	def.	Chatt Lavender	TKO (doctor stoppage)	1	3:24
Lightweight	Vitor Ribeiro	def.	Charlie Kohler	TKO (doctor stoppage)	1	3:50
Welterweight	Tiki Ghosn	def.	Paul Rodriguez	Decision (unanimous)	3	5:00

=== WFA 2: Level 2 ===
WFA 2: Level 2
- Promotion: World Fighting Alliance
- Date: July 5, 2002
- Venue: The Joint
- City: Las Vegas, Nevada, United States

Event chronology
World Fighting Alliance 1	WFA 2: Level 2	WFA 3: Level 3

WFA 2: Level 2 was a mixed martial arts event held by World Fighting Alliance on July 5, 2002 at The Joint in Las Vegas, Nevada.

Results

Main card
Weight class				Method	Round	Time	Notes
Middleweight	Jermaine Andre	def.	Joey Villaseñor	TKO (foot injury)	1	0:21
Middleweight	Frank Trigg	def.	Jason Medina	TKO (submission to elbows)	1	3:43
Heavyweight	Kimo Leopoldo	def.	Tim Lajcik	TKO (toe injury)	1	1:55
Heavyweight	Aaron Brink	def.	Valentijn Overeem	TKO (punches)	1	2:24
Welterweight	Tiki Ghosn	def.	Kit Cope	TKO (retirement)	2	5:00
Lightweight	Vitor Ribeiro	def.	Joe Hurley	Technical Submission (arm-triangle choke)	2	1:19
Light Heavyweight	Marvin Eastman	def.	Tommy Sauer	TKO (elbows)	2	1:35

=== WFA 3: Level 3 ===
WFA 3: Level 3
- Promotion: World Fighting Alliance
- Date: November 23, 2002
- Venue: The Aladdin
- City: Las Vegas, Nevada, United States

Event chronology
WFA 2: Level 2	WFA 3: Level 3	WFA: King of the Streets

WFA 3: Level 3 was a mixed martial arts event held by World Fighting Alliance on November 23, 2002 at The Aladdin in Las Vegas, Nevada.

Results

Main card
Weight class				Method	Round	Time	Notes
Welterweight	Frank Trigg	def.	Dennis Hallman	TKO (injury)	1	3:50	(Note: For the WFA Welterweight Championship)
Light Heavyweight	Marvin Eastman	def.	Alex Stiebling	KO (punch)	1	1:07	(Note: For the WFA Light Heavyweight Championship)
Lightweight	Josh Thomson	def.	Rob McCullough	Decision (unanimous)	3	5:00
Heavyweight	Mike van Arsdale	def.	Chris Haseman	TKO (punches)	2	3:10
Welterweight	Vitor Ribeiro	def.	Eddie Yagin	Technical Submission (arm-triangle choke)	2	2:23
Welterweight	Jason Black	def.	Chad W. Saunders	TKO (retirement)	2	5:00
Featherweight	Jeff Curran	def.	Todd Lally	Submission (triangle choke)	1	4:49
