= WEC 35 =

WEC MMA event in 2008

WEC 35: Condit vs. Miura
- The poster for WEC 35: Condit vs. Miura
- Promotion: World Extreme Cagefighting
- Date: August 3, 2008
- Venue: Hard Rock Hotel and Casino
- City: Paradise, Nevada
- Attendance: 1,006
- Total gate: $116,900

Event chronology
WEC 34: Faber vs. Pulver	WEC 35: Condit vs. Miura	WEC 36: Faber vs. Brown

WEC 35: Condit vs. Miura was a mixed martial arts event held by World Extreme Cagefighting that took place on August 3, 2008 at the Hard Rock Hotel and Casino in Paradise, Nevada. The event drew an estimated 423,000 viewers on Versus. The event featured three title fights, the first time a Zuffa, LLC promoted MMA card featured more than two title fights on the same card since UFC 33 in 2001; there would not be another UFC event with more than two until UFC 205 in 2016, after Zuffa had sold the promotion.

== Background ==
A featherweight bout between Cub Swanson and Hiroyuki Takaya was originally scheduled for this event, but Swanson pulled out due to a broken hand. Promotional newcomer LC Davis had verbally agreed to replace Swanson, but Takaya did not approve the new matchup, and the bout was removed from the card. The Swanson/Takaya bout was rescheduled for WEC 37 in December 2008, where Swanson won by unanimous decision.

== Results ==
Main card
Weight class				Method	Round	Time	Notes
Welterweight	Carlos Condit (c)	def.	Hiromitsu Miura	TKO (strikes)	4	4:43	(Note: For the Welterweight Championship.)
Light Heavyweight	Steve Cantwell	def.	Brian Stann (c)	TKO (punches)	2	4:01	(Note: For the Light Heavyweight Championship.)
Lightweight	Jamie Varner (c)	def.	Marcus Hicks	TKO (punches)	1	2:08	(Note: For the Lightweight Championship.)
Bantamweight	Brian Bowles	def	Damacio Page	Submission (guillotine choke)	1	3:30
Preliminary card
Welterweight	Brock Larson	def	Carlo Prater	KO (punches)	1	0:37
Welterweight	Blas Avena	def	Dave Terrel	TKO (punches)	1	1:07
Featherweight	Josh Grispi	def	Micah Miller	TKO (strikes)	1	0:50
Lightweight	Shane Roller	def	Todd Moore	Submission (guillotine choke)	1	3:00
Lightweight	Mike Budnik	def	Greg McIntyre	Submission (triangle choke)	3	3:21
Bantamweight	Scott Jorgensen	def	Kenji Osawa	Decision (unanimous) (30-27, 30-27, 30-27)	3	5:00

== Bonus awards ==
Fighters were awarded $7,500 bonuses.

- Fight of the Night: (United States) Carlos Condit vs. (Japan) Hiromitsu Miura
- Knockout of the Night: (United States) Brock Larson
- Submission of the Night: (United States) Brian Bowles

== Reported payout ==
The following is the reported payout to the fighters as reported to the Nevada State Athletic Commission. It does not include sponsor money or "locker room" bonuses often given by the WEC.

- Carlos Condit: $44,000 (includes $22,000 win bonus) def. Hiromitsu Miura: $5,000
- Steve Cantwell: $10,000 ($5,000 win bonus) def. Brian Stann: $11,000
- Jamie Varner: $30,000 ($15,000 win bonus) def. Marcus Hicks: $16,000
- Brian Bowles: $8,000 ($4,000 win bonus) def. Damacio Page: $6,000
- Josh Grispi: $8,000 ($4,000 win bonus) def. Micah Miller: $5,000
- Brock Larson: $30,000 ($15,000 win bonus) def. Carlo Prater: $7,000
- Blas Avena: $12,000 ($6,000 win bonus) def. Dave Terrel: $3,000
- Shane Roller: $12,000 ($6,000 win bonus) def. Todd Moore: $4,000
- Mike Budnik: $6,000 ($3,000 win bonus) def. Greg McIntyre: $2,000
- Scott Jorgensen: $6,000 ($3,000 win bonus) def. Kenji Osawa: $5,000

== See also ==
- World Extreme Cagefighting
- List of World Extreme Cagefighting champions
- List of WEC events
- 2008 in WEC
