= WEC 25 =

WEC MMA event in 2007

WEC 25: McCullough vs. Cope
- The poster for WEC 25: McCullough vs. Cope
- Promotion: World Extreme Cagefighting
- Date: January 20, 2007
- Venue: Hard Rock Hotel and Casino
- City: Las Vegas, Nevada

Event chronology
WEC 24: Full Force	WEC 25: McCullough vs. Cope	WEC 26: Condit vs. Alessio

WEC 25: McCullough vs. Cope was the first mixed martial arts event held by the World Extreme Cagefighting under Zuffa management. The event was held on January 20, 2007. WEC 25's main event was a championship fight for the vacant WEC Lightweight Title, between rivals Rob McCullough and Kit Cope. The co-main event was a WEC Featherweight Title bout between champion, Urijah Faber and challenger Joe Pearson.

A WEC Light Heavyweight Title bout was originally advertised between champion Doug Marshall and Jorge Oliveira, but the bout was later pulled from the card. Marshall would instead make his first title defense against Justin McElfresh at WEC 27 in May 2007.

== Results ==
Main card
Weight class				Method	Round	Time	Notes
Lightweight	Rob McCullough	def	Kit Cope	TKO (Submission to punches)	1	2:52	(Note: For the Lightweight Championship.)
Featherweight	Urijah Faber (c)	def	Joe Pearson	TKO (Submission to strikes)	1	2:31	(Note: For the Featherweight Championship.)
Welterweight	John Alessio	def	Brian Gassaway	Submission (rear naked choke)	1	4:50
Middleweight	Logan Clark	def	Blas Avena	TKO (elbows)	3	4:23
Preliminary card
Middleweight	Brendan Seguin	def	Fernando Gonzalez	Decision (unanimous) (30-27, 30-27, 30-27)	3	5:00
Welterweight	Alex Karalexis	def	Olaf Alfonso	TKO (punches)	2	3:53
Welterweight	Carlos Condit	def	Kyle Jensen	Submission (rear naked choke)	1	2:10
Bantamweight	Antonio Banuelos	def	Mike French	Decision (unanimous) (30-27, 30-27, 30-27)	3	5:00
Lightweight	Richard Crunkilton	def	Mike Joy	Submission (anaconda choke)	3	4:23

== Reported Payout ==
The following is the reported payout to the fighters as reported to the Nevada State Athletic Commission. It does not include sponsor money or "locker room" bonuses often given by the WEC.

- Rob McCullough: $20,000 (includes $10,000 win bonus) def. Kit Cope: $5,000
- Urijah Faber: $10,000 ($5,000 win bonus) def. Joe Pearson: $4,000
- John Alessio: $10,000 ($4,000 win bonus) def. Brian Gassaway: $4,000
- Logan Clark: $12,000 ($6,000 win bonus) def. Blas Avena: $2,500
- Brendan Seguin: $4,000 ($2,000 win bonus) def. Fernando Gonzalez: $3,000
- Alex Karalexis: $8,000 ($4,000 win bonus) def. Olaf Alfanso: $4,000
- Carlos Condit: $8,000 ($4,000 win bonus) def. Kyle Jensen: $3,000
- Antonio Banuelos: $6,000 ($3,000 win bonus) def. Mike French: $3,000
- Rich Crunkilton: $10,000 ($5,000 win bonus) def. Mike Joy: $2,000

== Miscelleaneous ==
- First WEC show under Zuffa management.
- The WEC Lightweight Title was previously held by Hermes Franca, who had to vacate it in order to continue to compete in the UFC

== See also ==
- World Extreme Cagefighting
- List of WEC champions
- List of WEC events
- 2007 in WEC
