= WEC 42 =

WEC MMA event in 2009

WEC 42: Torres vs. Bowles
- The poster for WEC 42: Torres vs. Bowles
- Promotion: World Extreme Cagefighting
- Date: August 9, 2009
- Venue: Hard Rock Hotel and Casino
- City: Paradise, Nevada
- Attendance: 2,082
- Total gate: $175,835

Event chronology
WEC 41: Brown vs. Faber 2	WEC 42: Torres vs. Bowles	WEC 43: Cerrone vs. Henderson

WEC 42: Torres vs. Bowles was a mixed martial arts event held by World Extreme Cagefighting on August 9, 2009, at the Hard Rock Hotel and Casino in Las Vegas, Nevada.

== Background ==
Kenji Osawa was originally scheduled to face Rani Yahya at this event, but was pulled from the bout due to injury and replaced by WEC newcomer John Hosman.

The event drew an estimated 670,000 viewers on Versus.

== Results ==
Main card
Weight class				Method	Round	Time	Notes
Bantamweight	Brian Bowles	def	Miguel Torres (c)	KO (punches)	1	3:57	(Note: For the WEC Bantamweight Championship.)
Bantamweight	Dominick Cruz	def	Joseph Benavidez	Decision (unanimous) (30–27, 29–28, 29–28)	3	5:00
Lightweight	Danny Castillo	def	Ricardo Lamas	TKO (punches)	2	4:15
Bantamweight	Takeya Mizugaki	def	Jeff Curran	Decision (split) (29-28, 28-29, 29-28)	3	5:00
Featherweight	Leonard Garcia	def	Jameel Massouh	Decision (split) (29-28, 28-29, 29-28)	3	5:00
Preliminary card
Featherweight	Fredson Paixão	vs.	Cole Province	No Contest (overturned)	3	5:00	(Note: Originally ruled a split decision (29–28, 28-29, 29–28) victory for Province, the result was changed to "No Contest" after Province tested positive for a banned substance during a post fight screening.)
Catchweight (159 lb)	Shane Roller	def	Marcus Hicks	Decision (unanimous) (30–27, 29–28, 29–28)	3	5:00
Lightweight	Ed Ratcliff	def	Phil Cardella	Decision (unanimous) (30–27, 30-27, 29–28)	3	5:00
Bantamweight	Rani Yahya	def	John Hosman	Submission (north-south choke)	1	2:08
Featherweight	Diego Nunes	def	Rafael Dias	Decision (unanimous) (30–27, 30-27, 30-27)	3	5:00
Featherweight	LC Davis	def	Javier Vazquez	Decision (split) (30-27, 28–29, 29–28)	3	5:00

== Bonus Awards ==
Fighters were awarded $10,000 bonuses.

- Fight of the Night: (United States) Joseph Benavidez vs. (United States) Dominick Cruz
- Knockout of the Night: (United States) Brian Bowles
- Submission of the Night: (Brazil) Rani Yahya

== Reported payout ==
The following is the reported payout to the fighters as reported to the Nevada State Athletic Commission. It does not include sponsor money or "locker room" bonuses often given by the WEC.

- Brian Bowles: $18,000 (includes $9,000 win bonus) def. Miguel Torres: $26,000
- Dominick Cruz: $14,000 ($7,000 win bonus) def. Joseph Benavidez: $12,500
- Danny Castillo: $14,000 ($7,000 win bonus) def. Ricardo Lamas: $4,000
- Takeya Mizugaki: $12,000 ($6,000 win bonus) def. Jeff Curran: $8,000
- Leonard Garcia: $24,000 ($12,000 win bonus) def. Jameel Massouh: $3,000
- Cole Province: $6,000 ($3,000 win bonus) def. Fredson Paixao: $2,000
- Shane Roller: $21,200 ($10,000 win bonus) def. Marcus Hicks: $6,800 ^
- Ed Ratciff: $14,000 ($7,000 win bonus) def. Phil Cardella: $3,000
- Rani Yahya: $16,000 ($8,000 win bonus) def. John Hosman: $3,000
- Diego Nunes: $8,000 ($4,000 win bonus) def. Rafael Dias: $4,000
- LC Davis: $10,000 ($$5,000 win bonus) def. Javier Vasquez: $6,000

^ Roller was contracted to earn $10,000 in show money, while Hicks was scheduled to make $8,000. When Hicks was unable to make the contracted weight of 156 pounds at Saturday's weigh-ins, the two parties agreed to a catchweight bout of 159 pounds, and Roller was awarded 15 percent (or $1,200) of his opponent's show money.

== See also ==
- World Extreme Cagefighting
- List of World Extreme Cagefighting champions
- List of WEC events
- 2009 in WEC
