= WEC 31 =

WEC MMA event in 2007

WEC 31: Faber vs. Curran
- The poster for WEC 31: Faber vs. Curran
- Promotion: World Extreme Cagefighting
- Date: December 12, 2007
- Venue: Hard Rock Hotel and Casino
- City: Paradise, Nevada

Event chronology
WEC 30: McCullough vs. Crunkilton	WEC 31: Faber vs. Curran	WEC 32: New Mexico

WEC 31: Faber vs. Curran was a mixed martial arts (MMA) event held by World Extreme Cagefighting (WEC). The event took place on Wednesday, December 12, 2007, at the Hard Rock Hotel and Casino in Las Vegas, Nevada and was aired live on the Versus Network.

The main event featured a featherweight title match between champion Urijah Faber and challenger Jeff Curran. The card also featured Doug Marshall defending his light heavyweight championship against Ariel Gandulla, Paulo Filho defending his middleweight championship against Chael Sonnen, and the WEC debut of former UFC Lightweight champion Jens Pulver.

Future WEC & UFC champion Dominick Cruz was scheduled to make his bantamweight debut against Charlie Valencia at this event but was later forced from the card and replaced by Ian McCall. The Cruz/Valencia bout was rescheduled for WEC 34 the following June, where Cruz won by unanimous decision.

A featherweight bout between Chance Farrar and Micah Miller was originally slated for this event but was pulled from the card three weeks beforehand after Farrar suffered a hand injury. The bout was instead rescheduled for WEC 32 two months later, where Miller won by knockout.

The event drew an estimated 629,000 viewers on Versus.

== Results ==
Main card
Weight class				Method	Round	Time	Notes
Featherweight	Urijah Faber (c)	def	Jeff Curran	Submission (guillotine choke)	2	4:34	(Note: For the Featherweight Championship.)
Middleweight	Paulo Filho (c)	def	Chael Sonnen	Submission (armbar)	2	4:55	(Note: For the Middleweight Championship. Filho's victory was controversial because Sonnen did not appear to tap out, but yelled while the armbar was placed, and the referee took this as a verbal submission.)
Light Heavyweight	Doug Marshall (c)	def	Ariel Gandulla	Submission (armbar)	1	0:55	(Note: For the Light Heavyweight Championship.)
Featherweight	Jens Pulver	def	Cub Swanson	Submission (anaconda choke)	1	0:35
Preliminary card
Welterweight	John Alessio	def	Todd Moore	Decision (unanimous) (30–27, 30–27, 29–28)	3	5:00
Middleweight	Bryan Baker	def	Eric Schambari	Decision (split) (29–28, 28–29, 29–28)	3	5:00
Lightweight	Ed Ratcliff	def	Alex Karalexis	TKO (strikes)	2	1:26
Bantamweight	Brian Bowles	def	Marcos Galvao	KO (punch)	2	2:09	(Note: This bout, although preliminary, appeared on the live broadcast.)
Bantamweight	Charlie Valencia	def	Ian McCall	Submission (guillotine choke)	1	3:19	(Note: This bout, although preliminary, appeared on the live broadcast.)

== Reported Payouts ==
The following is the reported payout to the fighters as reported to the Nevada State Athletic Commission. It does not include sponsor money or "locker room" bonuses often given by the WEC.

- Urijah Faber: $40,000 (includes $20,000 win bonus) def. Jeff Curran: $10,000
- Paulo Filho: $56,000 ($28,000 win bonus) def. Chael Sonnen: $25,000
- Doug Marshall: $10,000 ($5,000 win bonus) def. Ariel Gandulla: $4,000
- Jens Pulver: $60,000 ($30,000 win bonus) def. Cub Swanson: $5,000
- John Alessio: $26,000 ($13,000 win bonus) def. Todd Moore: $4,000
- Bryan Baker: $8,000 ($4,000 win bonus) def. Eric Schambari: $5,000
- Ed Ratcliff: $8,000 ($4,000 win bonus) def. Alex Karalexis: $8,000
- Brian Bowles: $6,000 ($3,000 win bonus) def. Marcos Galvao: $5,000
- Charles Valencia: $12,000 ($6,000 win bonus) def. Ian McCall: $3,000

== See also ==
- World Extreme Cagefighting
- List of WEC champions
- List of WEC events
- 2007 in WEC
