= WEC 27 =

World Extreme Cagefighting mixed martial arts event in 2007

WEC 27: Marshall vs. McElfresh
- The poster for WEC 27: Marshall vs. McElfresh
- Promotion: World Extreme Cagefighting
- Date: May 12, 2007
- Venue: Hard Rock Hotel and Casino
- City: Las Vegas, Nevada

Event chronology
WEC 26: Condit vs. Alessio	WEC 27: Marshall vs. McElfresh	WEC 28: WrekCage

WEC 27: Marshall vs. McElfresh was the third mixed martial arts event held by the World Extreme Cagefighting under Zuffa management. The event was held on May 12, 2007.

UFC lightweight fighter and future WEC Lightweight Champion Jamie Varner was expected to make his promotional debut on this card against Richard Crunkilton, but the fight was removed from the card after Varner suffered training injuries.

== Results ==
Main card
Weight class				Method	Round	Time	Notes
Light Heavyweight	Doug Marshall (c)	def	Justin McElfresh	KO (punches)	1	2:16	(Note: For the Light Heavyweight Championship.)
Middleweight	Jason Miller	def	Hiromitsu Miura	Decision (unanimous) (29–28, 29–28, 29–28)	3	5:00
Light Heavyweight	Ariel Gandulla	def	Gary Padilla	Decision (split) (29–28, 28–29, 29–28)	3	5:00
Lightweight	Sherron Leggett	def	Charlie Kohler	TKO (strikes)	2	2:25
Preliminary card
Lightweight	Marcus Hicks	def	Sergio Gomez	Submission (guillotine choke)	2	3:20
Welterweight	Tom Speer	def	Sidney Silva	KO (punches)	1	4:33
Featherweight	Manny Tapia	def	Brandon Foxworth	TKO (strikes)	2	3:17
Welterweight	Ed Ratcliff	def	Johnny Sampaio	TKO (knee injury)	1	1:31
Middleweight	Eric Schambari	def	Art Santore	Decision (unanimous) (29–28, 30–27, 30–27)	3	5:00

== Reported payout ==
The following is the reported payout to the fighters as reported to the Nevada State Athletic Commission. It does not include sponsor money or "locker room" bonuses often given by the WEC.

- Doug Marshall: $8,000 (includes $4,000 win bonus) def. Justin McElfresh: $3,000
- Jason Miller: $30,000 ($15,000 win bonus) def. Hiromitsu Miura: $3,000
- Ariel Gandulla: $6,000 ($3,000 win bonus) def. Gary Padilla: $3,000
- Sherron Leggett: $6,000 ($3,000 win bonus) def. Charlie Kohler: $5,000
- Marcus Hicks: $6,000 ($3,000 win bonus) def. Sergio Gomez: $4,000
- Tommy Speer: $4,000 ($2,000 win bonus) def. Sidney Silva: $4,000
- Manny Tapia: $8,000 ($4,000 win bonus) def. Brandon Foxworth: $4,000
- Ed Ratcliff: $6,000 ($3,000 win bonus) def. Johnny Sampaio: $2,000
- Eric Schambari: $6,000 ($3,000 win bonus) def. Art Santore: $6,000

== See also ==
- World Extreme Cagefighting
- List of WEC champions
- List of WEC events
- 2007 in WEC
