= Eric Schambari =

American mixed martial arts fighter

- Born: April 22, 1978 (age 48); California
- Nationality: American
- Height: 6 ft 0 in (1.83 m)
- Weight: 185 lb (84 kg; 13.2 st)
- Division: Middleweight
- Stance: Southpaw
- Fighting out of: Las Vegas, Nevada, United States
- Team: Team Takedown; Marc Laimon's Cobra Kai
- Years active: 2005–present

Mixed martial arts record
- Total: 21
- Wins: 15
- By knockout: 1
- By submission: 9
- By decision: 5
- Losses: 6
- By knockout: 1
- By submission: 2
- By decision: 3

Other information
- Mixed martial arts record from Sherdog

Eric Schambari (born April 22, 1978) is an American professional mixed martial artist who competes in the middleweight division. A professional MMA competitor since 2005, Schambari has most notably fought in World Extreme Cagefighting and was a semi-finalist in the Bellator Season Two: Middleweight Tournament, where he was eliminated by Bryan Baker.

== Mixed martial arts career ==
=== Background ===
Schambari began his career in 2005 and compiled a record of 5–0 in local promotions before joining the WEC. Schambari trains at Marc Laimon's Cobra Kai gym in Victorville, California. Schambari has trained with the likes of Travis Lutter, Joe Stevenson and Guy Mezger.

On December 20, 2014, Eric received his black belt in Brazilian jiu-jitsu from Travis Lutter.

=== World Extreme Cagefighting ===
Schambari signed for the WEC and made his debut on the undercard of WEC 27 against Art Santore. In a close fight, Schambari took the unanimous decision (30–27, 30–27 and 29–28), which was suggested to be due to Schambari's superior cardio and slight advantage in damage caused.

He then fought Logan Clark at WEC 29. Schambari once again took the unanimous decision (all three judges scoring the bout 29–28). However, this decision was viewed as slightly controversial considering that Clark was able to do more damage from the bottom with up-kicks, in addition to locking in a gogoplata and an omoplata.

Schambari suffered his first career defeat, losing to Bryan Baker via split decision at WEC 31 in December 2007.

Soon after, Schambari was injured in training and suffered an allergic reaction to medication that nearly cost him his life and career. Later, he returned to training and competition against the advice of his doctors.

This injury, combined with the dissolution of the middleweight division in the WEC, after its purchase by the UFC, led to his release. Schambari then fought in smaller promotions, defeating four fighters (three via first round submission and one via majority decision). The latter of these victories saw Schambari headline an event, competing against Will Espich in San Juan, Puerto Rico. This fight saw Schambari win via submission (arm-triangle choke).

=== Bellator Fighting Championship ===
Schambari then signed for Bellator and entered into their Middleweight tournament. There, he was joined by the only man to have defeated him at this point in his career, Bryan Baker.

In the first round of the tournament, Schambari faced The Ultimate Fighter 7 competitor Luke Zachrich. Schambari was far more effective and after 3:34 of the first round, Schambari locked in an arm-triangle choke and forced the tap-out.

This advanced Schambari into the semi-finals of the tournament where he would have a rematch with Bryan Baker. This fight took place at Bellator 20 and Baker was again the winner, this time via triangle choke at 2:29 of the first round. Schambari was successful with an early takedown, however, Baker worked well from his back and managed to secure the submission. This eliminated Schambari from the tournament.

Returning in Bellator's third season in September 2010 at Bellator 28, Schambari faced the veteran Matt Horwich. Schambari won the fight via split decision after utilizing an effective jab-and-run strategy.

== Mixed martial arts record ==
Professional record breakdown
21 matches	15 wins	6 losses
By knockout	1	1
By submission	9	2
By decision	5	3

Res.	Record	Opponent	Method	Event	Date	Round	Time	Location	Notes
Loss	15–6	Marcus Sursa	Submission (triangle choke)	C3 Fights - Rock Em Sock Em Weekend	April 27, 2013	3	2:07	Clinton, Oklahoma, United States	
Loss	15–5	Bubba McDaniel	Decision (unanimous)	Fight Game - Premier Event	December 2, 2011	3	5:00	Frisco, Texas, United States	
Loss	15–4	Andrew Craig	Decision (unanimous)	Legacy FC 8	September 16, 2011	3	5:00	Houston, Texas, United States	For Legacy FC Middleweight Championship
Loss	15–3	Anthony Smith	TKO (punches)	C3 Fights: MMA Championship Fights	June 4, 2011	1	1:46	Concho, Oklahoma, United States	
Win	15–2	Edwin Aguilar	Submission (heel hook)	XCage: Predators	April 8, 2011	1	1:26	Concho, Oklahoma, United States	
Win	14–2	John Bryant	Submission (arm-triangle choke)	C3 Fights: Slammin Jammin Weekend 6	October 22, 2010	2	1:14	Newkirk, Oklahoma, United States	
Win	13–2	Matt Horwich	Decision (split)	Bellator 28	September 9, 2010	3	5:00	New Orleans, Louisiana, United States	
Loss	12–2	Bryan Baker	Submission (triangle choke)	Bellator 20	May 27, 2010	1	2:29	San Antonio, Texas, United States	Middleweight Tournament Semifinal
Win	12–1	Luke Zachrich	Submission (arm-triangle choke)	Bellator 16	April 29, 2010	1	3:34	Kansas City, Missouri, United States	Middleweight Tournament Quarterfinal
Win	11–1	Will Espich	Submission (arm-triangle choke)	Maximo Fighting Championship	October 17, 2009	1	1:44	San Juan, Puerto Rico	
Win	10–1	Dominic Brown	Submission (rear-naked choke)	C3: Slammin Jammin Weekend 1	September 18, 2009	1	1:04	Newkirk, Oklahoma, United States	
Win	9–1	Nate James	Decision (majority)	Slammin Jammin Weekend 3	May 9, 2009	3	3:00	Newkirk, Oklahoma, United States	
Win	8–1	John Bryant	Submission (rear-naked choke)	C3 Fights	February 28, 2009	1	2:57	Newkirk, Oklahoma, United States	
Loss	7–1	Bryan Baker	Decision (split)	WEC 31	December 12, 2007	3	5:00	Las Vegas, Nevada, United States	
Win	7–0	Logan Clark	Decision (unanimous)	WEC 29	August 5, 2007	3	5:00	Las Vegas, Nevada, United States	
Win	6–0	Art Santore	Decision (unanimous)	WEC 27	May 12, 2007	3	5:00	Las Vegas, Nevada, United States	
Win	5–0	Christian Smith	Submission (arm triangle choke)	Art of War 1	March 9, 2007	1	3:12	Dallas, Texas, United States	
Win	4–0	Ricardeau Francois	Submission	International Freestyle Fighting 1	May 6, 2006	1	4:30	Fort Worth, Texas, United States	
Win	3–0	Corey Salter	TKO (punches)	Ultimate Texas Showdown 4	February 25, 2006	1	1:19	Texas, United States	
Win	2–0	Sherman Pendergarst	Decision (unanimous)	Inferno Promotions: Meltdown	July 22, 2005	3	5:00	Dallas, Texas, United States	
Win	1–0	Jamey Herbert	Submission (kimura)	Inferno Promotions: Meltdown	June 24, 2005	1	N/A	Dallas, Texas, United States	
