= Kit Cope =

American mixed martial arts fighter

- Born: Kristopher Lee Cope; March 17, 1977 (age 49); Williams, Arizona, United States
- Other names: Cobra and CHEATER; Doctor; Havoc; The Prophecy; Part-Time Lover
- Height: 1.83 m (6 ft 0 in)
- Weight: 70.0 kg (154.3 lb; 11.02 st)
- Division: Featherweight; Lightweight; Welterweight
- Reach: 72 1/2 in (184 cm)
- Style: Kickboxing, Muay Thai
- Stance: Orthodox
- Fighting out of: Las Vegas, Nevada, United States
- Team: Twisted Genetiks; Wand Fight Team; SitWishan
- Trainer: Master Toddy; Master Chan; Nick Diaz
- Rank: Purple belt in Brazilian jiu-jitsu
- Years active: 1995–present

Professional boxing record
- Total: 3
- Wins: 1
- By knockout: 1
- Losses: 1
- No contests: 1

Kickboxing record
- Total: 25
- Wins: 23
- By knockout: 9
- Losses: 2

Mixed martial arts record
- Total: 13
- Wins: 6
- By knockout: 3
- By submission: 3
- Losses: 7
- By submission: 6

Other information
- Website: www.kitcope.com
- Boxing record from BoxRec
- Mixed martial arts record from Sherdog
- Last updated on: September 8, 2012

Kristopher Lee "Kit" Cope (born March 17, 1977) is an American Muay Thai kickboxer and mixed martial artist who competes in the Featherweight, Lightweight, and Welterweight divisions. A four-time professional Muay Thai World Champion, Cope also fought in the K-1, Ultimate Fighting Championship and World Extreme Cagefighting promotions.

== Career ==
Kit Cope was born on Williams Air Force Base in Williams, Arizona and later relocated to Las Vegas, Nevada. He began his fighting career as a Muay Thai kickboxer after having only one amateur bout, becoming professional, going 15-0 and winning, among other titles, the IKKC International Welterweight title, the WMTF World Welterweight title, the WMTA World Welterweight title, the ITBF World Light Welterweight title and the highly regarded IPMTO World Light Heavyweight Championship, which would later be renamed as the WPMF. Cope suffered the first loss of his career on November 22, 1999 when he was knocked out by Akeomi Nitta in the All Japan Kickboxing Federation in Tokyo, Japan. Cope was leading on the scorecards heading into the third round, but was slowing due to an onslaught of low kicks from Nitta, who scored a knockdown at the end of round three. Cope was able to beat the referee's count but Nitta switched to a high kick which left Cope unable to again beat the referee's count at the 2:21 mark of round three.

On March 17, 2000, accepting the bout on 1 week notice, Cope defeated reigning ISKA World Super Welterweight (-69.5 kg/153.2 lb) Muay Thai Champion Alex Gong by unanimous decision in a non-title bout in Las Vegas. He also fought in shoot boxing that year, losing a unanimous decision to Kenichi Ogata in Tokyo on May 21, 2000. Cope made his American K-1 debut on August 17, 2002 and stopped Heath Harris with a low kick, breaking Harris' femur in the opening round on the K-1 World Grand Prix 2002 in Las Vegas undercard.

He was featured in an episode of True Life entitled "I'm a Muay Thai Fighter", which chronicled his training and journey to Thailand where he knocked out Burmese fighter Mojo Mawadee in a bare-knuckle lethwei match at the Songkran Festival in Mae Sot on April 13, 2004. Then again in 2008 Cope was featured in another True Life episode entitled "I'm a Mixed Martial Arts Fighter" whereupon he defeated Dave Cochran in a very bloody fight that ended with Kit Cope forcing Cochran to submit to a triangle choke. Cope was cornered by UFC title contender Nate Diaz.

Having begun his mixed martial arts career in 1998, Cope debuted in the Ultimate Fighting Championship at The Ultimate Fighter 2 Finale in his hometown of Las Vegas on November 5, 2005. He was caught in an armbar at the end of round one and actually tapped out after the bell signaling the end of the round had already rung, however, and he continued in round two with his arm noticeably injured. He submitted to a rear-naked choke soon after. During the broadcast, commentator Mike Goldberg made a number of dubious and complimentary comments on Cope's Muay Thai accomplishments, calling him "the cream of the crop in Muay Thai" and "one of the best" strikers in the world.

On January 20, 2007, he fought fellow Muay Thai stylist Rob McCullough for the vacant WEC Lightweight Championship at WEC 25 and lost via submission due to an injury. Following the bout, he tested positive for the anabolic steroid Boldenone which is on the banned substances list of all the major athletic commissions and sports leagues.

He was expected to make his return to Muay Thai against Jose Palacios for the WBC Muaythai United States welterweight (-66.678 kg/147 lb) title at Lion Fight: Battle in the Desert 4 on November 19, 2011. However, he was not cleared to fight by the Nevada Athletic Commission for unknown reasons and was replaced by Malaipet Sasiprapa. The fight was rescheduled for Lion Fight: Battle in the Desert 5 on February 25, 2012 but he again withdrew.

Cope returned to K-1 ten years after his first appearance in the promotion, facing Chaz Mulkey at the K-1 World Grand Prix 2012 in Los Angeles on September 8, 2012. He injured himself while attempting a spinning kick in round two, and Mulkey was able to knock him down three time by attacking his injured leg, which caused referee Vichai "Rex" Supkitpol to stop the bout and announce Mulkey as the winner by TKO.

== Personal life ==
Cope was once engaged to Gina Carano.

He was a contestant on a March 15, 2004 episode of Fear Factor, a reality television game show, and also featured twice on MTV's True Life in the episodes "I'm a Muay Thai Fighter" and "I'm a Mixed Martial Arts Fighter". In 2007, he was one of three hosts on Wild World of Spike, a television series featuring amateur sports footage and the hosts' attempts at recreating them.

Got married August 28, 2016 to Lacee Casas

== Championships and awards ==
=== Amateur wrestling ===
- Nevada State Wrestling
  - Nevada State Freestyle Wrestling Champion (two times)

=== Kickboxing ===
- International Professional Muay Thai Organization
  - IPMTO World Light Heavyweight Championship
- International Thai Boxing Federation
  - ITBF World Light Welterweight Championship
- World Muay Thai Association
  - WMTA World Welterweight Championship
- World Muay Thai Federation
  - WMTF World Welterweight Championship
- International Karate Kickboxing Council
  - IKKC International Welterweight Championship

== Boxing record ==
Boxing record
1 win (1 KO), 1 loss, 0 draws
Date	Result	Opponent	Venue	Location	Method	Round	Time	Record
2000-11-18	Loss	(United States) Francisco Corrales	The Orleans	Las Vegas, Nevada, US	TKO	3	2:59	1-1
2000-07-28	Win	(United States) Edward Scolaro	The Orleans	Las Vegas, Nevada, US	TKO	2	0:16	1-0
Legend: Win Loss Draw/no contest Notes

== Kickboxing record ==
Kickboxing record
23 wins (9 KOs), 3 losses, 0 draws
Date	Result	Opponent	Event	Location	Method	Round	Time
2012-09-08	Loss	(United States) Chaz Mulkey	K-1 World Grand Prix 2012 in Los Angeles	Los Angeles, California, US	TKO (right low kick)	2	2:16
2004-04-13	Win	(Myanmar) Mojo Mawadee	2004 Songkran Festival	Mae Sot, Thailand	KO (right cross)	1	1:59
2002-09-28	Win	(Canada) Philippe Petit		Las Vegas, Nevada, US	Decision (unanimous)	5	3:00
2002-08-17	Win	(United States) Heath Harris	K-1 World Grand Prix 2002 in Las Vegas	Las Vegas, Nevada, US	KO (low kick)	2	0:55
2002-03-23	Win	(Canada) Clint Hale	Master Toddy Show	Las Vegas, Nevada, US	Decision (unanimous)	5	3:00
2000-05-21	Loss	(Japan) Kenichi Ogata	WSBA: Invade 3rd Stage	Tokyo, Japan	Decision (unanimous)	3	3:00
2000-03-17	Win	(United States) Alex Gong		Las Vegas, Nevada, US	Decision (unanimous)	5	3:00
1999-11-22	Loss	(Japan) Akeomi Nitta	AJKF: WAVE-XIII	Tokyo, Japan	KO (high kick)	3	2:21
Legend: Win Loss Draw/no contest Notes

== Mixed martial arts record ==
Professional record breakdown
13 matches	6 wins	7 losses
By knockout	3	1
By submission	3	6

Res.	Record	Opponent	Method	Event	Date	Round	Time	Location	Notes
Win	6–7	Daniel Smyrk	TKO (punches)	Kings of Kombat 7	June 23, 2012	2		Keysborough, Victoria, Australia	
Win	5–7	Jeff Harrison	Submission (armbar)	Wreck MMA: Road to Glory	April 20, 2012	1	2:12	Gatineau, Quebec, Canada	
Loss	4–7	Freddy Assuncao	Submission (rear-naked choke)	Fight Night Entertainment: Round 13 – Impact	March 11, 2011	2	3:47	Bellingham, Washington, United States	
Loss	4–6	Corey Hill	Submission (triangle choke)	Raging Wolf VIII: Cage Supremacy	July 17, 2010	1	2:30	Salamanca, New York, United States	
Loss	4–5	Cameron Dollar	Submission (rear-naked choke)	Ring of Fire 36	December 5, 2009	1	4:38	Denver, Colorado, United States	
Win	4–4	Zach Skinner	TKO (punches)	Fight Night Events	May 31, 2008	2	3:27	Anaheim, California, United States	
Win	3–4	Dave Cochran	Submission (triangle choke)	World Fighting Championships 7: Lockdown	May 31, 2008	1	4:32	Atlantic City, New Jersey, United States	
Loss	2–4	Rob McCullough	Submission (injury)	WEC 25	January 20, 2007	1	2:53	Las Vegas, Nevada, United States	For the vacant WEC Lightweight Championship.
Loss	2–3	Kenny Florian	Submission (rear-naked choke)	The Ultimate Fighter 2 Finale	November 5, 2005	2	0:37	Las Vegas, Nevada, United States	
Win	2–2	Mike Lucero	TKO (strikes)	Valor Fighting: Home of the Brave	July 2, 2005	1	2:50	Susanville, California, United States	
Win	1–2	Emmett Olvera	Submission (guillotine choke)	Venom: First Strike	September 18, 2004	1	2:37	Huntington Beach, California, United States	
Loss	0–2	Tiki Ghosn	TKO (retirement)	WFA 2: Level 2	July 5, 2002	2	5:00	Las Vegas, Nevada, United States	
Loss	0–1	William Sriyapai	Submission (rear-naked choke)	King of the Cage 1	October 30, 1999	1	3:18	San Jacinto, California, United States	
