= Bryan Baker (fighter) =

American mixed martial arts fighter (born 1985)

- Born: October 13, 1985 (age 41)
- Other names: The Beast
- Nationality: American
- Height: 6 ft 3 in (1.91 m)
- Weight: 170 lb (77 kg; 12 st)
- Division: Welterweight; Middleweight
- Reach: 77 in (196 cm)
- Fighting out of: West Covina, California, United States
- Team: Team Wildman Vale Tudo
- Years active: 2007–2013

Mixed martial arts record
- Total: 25
- Wins: 18
- By knockout: 8
- By submission: 3
- By decision: 7
- Losses: 6
- By knockout: 3
- By submission: 1
- By decision: 2
- No contests: 1

Other information
- Mixed martial arts record from Sherdog

Bryan Baker (born October 13, 1985) is an American former professional mixed martial artist who competed in the Middleweight division. A professional MMA competitor since 2007, Baker fought in various promotions, most notably World Extreme Cagefighting and Bellator. Baker was also a competitor in the second season of Bellator's Middleweight Tournament in 2010, reaching the final against Alexander Shlemenko.

== Mixed martial arts career ==
=== Early career ===
Baker began his professional mixed martial arts career in early 2007 for the Cage of Fire promotion in Mexico. His first fight was against Scott Rose, who Baker finished off quickly, in just over a minute, due to submission.

In April 2007, Baker faced Jesse Juarez and defeated him via third round submission (rear-naked choke). Baker then followed this up with two TKO victories, both in the first round, against Geoff Hawks and Reggie Orr.

=== World Extreme Cagefighting ===
Baker then signed for World Extreme Cagefighting and made his debut at WEC 30 against Jesse Forbes. Baker was dropped early in the first round and was also subject to Forbes' slams. Whilst on the ground, Baker was able to get top position, which prompted Forbes to give his back. Baker continued to strike and the fight was stopped after 4:15 of the first round, due to TKO (punches).

Bryan was next scheduled to fight Nissen Osterneck at WEC 31, but this bout was replaced by a bout with Eric Schambari due to an injury to Osterneck. In a three round bout, Bryan won via split decision.

This led to a future bout against Logan Clark being scheduled at WEC 33. At the same card, Chael Sonnen was scheduled to fight Paulo Filho in a middleweight title rematch. However, this fight was cancelled after Filho had to check himself into a rehabilitation center and Baker was offered to chance to fill in Filho, against Sonnen.

Baker accepted and stepped into the bout with less than two weeks notice and suffered his first ever MMA loss. Sonnen dominated the fight with multiple takedowns and was able to shrug off many submission attempts by Baker. Sonnen pulled off the unanimous decision with scores of 30-26, 30-25 and 30-25.

=== Post-WEC ===
Baker's first appearance after WEC, was at a charity event against Gary Padilla. In a strong showing of striking ability, Baker pulled off the unanimous decision victory.

Baker then stepped in at short notice once again, this time, against Spencer Canup for the CFP Middleweight Championship. Baker won via first round TKO (punch).

Baker then signed for Maximum Fighting Championship. In his promotion debut, Baker beat Ultimate Fighter 3 alumni Rory Singer via first round TKO via punches, just seconds before the end of the first round.

=== Bellator Fighting Championships ===
Baker made his Bellator debut against IFL and Ultimate Fighting Championship alumni Matt Horwich at Bellator 10. Baker was victorious via unanimous decision.

Baker then returned to MFC and was scheduled to fight former UFC Middleweight title contender, Thales Leites. Baker instead faced Art Santore and won via unanimous decision.

Baker then signed with Bellator to take part in their middleweight tournament in the second Bellator season.

In the first round of the tournament, Baker defeated Sean Loeffler via TKO at Bellator 16.

In the semi-final round, Baker faced Eric Schambari for the second time in his career. After 2:29 of the first round, Baker managed to submit his opponent with a triangle choke, which advanced him to the final of the middleweight tournament.

Baker faced Alexander Shlemenko in the Bellator Middleweight tournament final on June 24, 2010, at Bellator 23. Coming into the fight, Baker had recorded two opening-round finishes, but on this occasion, he was on the losing side of an opening-round finish, as he suffered a TKO loss after just 2:45. After early exchanges between the two fighters, Shlemenko hit Baker with a strong liver shot, followed by a combination that dropped him. Shlemenko then continued his attack until the referee stopped the fight.

On September 21, 2010, it was revealed that Baker was battling chronic myelogenous leukemia and had only gone into remission three weeks prior. Two days later, Baker faced the veteran Jeremy Horn at Bellator 30. The fight was "a grinding affair" with Horn attempting takedowns and a guillotine choke. Baker survived and ended the opening round with a few strikes. The next two rounds saw Horn become somewhat lethargic, giving Baker the opportunity to attempt a triangle armbar. After escaping the submission attempt, Horn's response was somewhat tame and at the end of three rounds, Baker was declared the winner via unanimous decision (30–27, 29–28, 29–28).

Baker defeated Joe Riggs by second round KO at Bellator 43. Post-fight, he proposed to his girlfriend and she immediately embraced him and said yes. They were married soon after.

Baker entered the Bellator Season Five Middleweight tournament. In the quarter-finals, he faced Bellator Season One Middleweight tournament finalist Jared Hess. He won by TKO in the third round after landing vicious ground and pound from the top.

In the semi-finals, Baker faced Brazilian jiu-jitsu world champion, Vitor Vianna. He lost the fight via TKO in the first round. Believing that Vianna had no striking skills, Baker threw wild shots at him and his recklessness cost him the fight as he was caught with an overhand right and against the cage Vianna hit him with continuous hammerfists until the referee stopped the fight.

In 2012, Baker elected to drop down a weight class to the welterweight division. He was featured Bellator Season 6 Welterweight Tournament. He faced Carlos Alexandre Pereira in the opening round of the tournament at Bellator 63 and won via split decision. In the semifinals, Baker faced Ben Saunders at Bellator 67 and won again via decision. He faced Karl Amoussou on July 20, 2012 in the finals at Bellator 72. He lost the fight via submission in the first round.

Baker then faced Douglas Lima at Bellator 86 on February 21, 2013. Baker would fill in for the injured Brent Weedman in the Season Eight Welterweight Tournament Semi-Finals. He lost via KO 2:34 into the first round.

In August 2014, Baker was among thirteen fighters that were released from the promotion.

=== Post-Bellator ===
Baker faced Elias Theodorou on December 18, 2021 at Colorado Combat Club 10. He lost the bout via unanimous decision.

== Championships and accomplishments ==
- Bellator Fighting Championships
  - Bellator Season 2 Middleweight Tournament Runner-Up
  - Bellator Season 6 Welterweight Tournament Runner-Up
- Fight Matrix
  - 2007 Rookie of the Year

== Mixed martial arts record ==
Professional record breakdown
| 25 matches | 18 wins | 6 losses |
| By knockout | 8 | 3 |
| By submission | 3 | 1 |
| By decision | 7 | 2 |
| No contests | 1 | |

| Res. | Record | Opponent | Method | Event | Date | Round | Time | Location | Notes |
|---|---|---|---|---|---|---|---|---|---|
| Loss | 18–6 (1) | Elias Theodorou | Decision (unanimous) | Colorado Combat Club 10 | December 18, 2021 | 3 | 5:00 | Greeley, Colorado, United States | |
| NC | 18–5 (1) | Mike Rhodes | NC (elbows to back of head) | Extreme Beatdown: Beatdown 21 | March 10, 2018 | 2 | 3:18 | New Town, North Dakota, United States | Baker threw illegal elbows to the back of Rhodes' head. |
| Loss | 18–5 | Douglas Lima | KO (punch) | Bellator 90 | February 21, 2013 | 1 | 2:34 | West Valley City, Utah, United States | Bellator Season 8 Welterweight Tournament Semifinal. |
| Loss | 18–4 | Karl Amoussou | Submission (inverted heel hook) | Bellator 72 | July 20, 2012 | 1 | 0:56 | Tampa, Florida, United States | Bellator Season 6 Welterweight Tournament Final. |
| Win | 18–3 | Ben Saunders | Decision (unanimous) | Bellator 67 | May 4, 2012 | 3 | 5:00 | Rama, Ontario, Canada | Bellator Season 6 Welterweight Tournament Semifinal. |
| Win | 17–3 | Carlos Alexandre Pereira | Decision (split) | Bellator 63 | March 30, 2012 | 3 | 5:00 | Uncasville, Connecticut, United States | Bellator Season 6 Welterweight Tournament Quarterfinal. |
| Loss | 16–3 | Vitor Vianna | TKO (punches) | Bellator 54 | October 15, 2011 | 1 | 0:54 | Atlantic City, New Jersey, United States | Bellator Season 5 Middleweight Tournament Semifinal. |
| Win | 16–2 | Jared Hess | TKO (punches) | Bellator 50 | September 17, 2011 | 3 | 2:52 | Hollywood, Florida, United States | Bellator Season 5 Middleweight Tournament Quarterfinal. |
| Win | 15–2 | Joe Riggs | KO (punch) | Bellator 43 | May 7, 2011 | 2 | 3:53 | Newkirk, Oklahoma, United States | |
| Win | 14–2 | Jeremy Horn | Decision (unanimous) | Bellator 30 | September 23, 2010 | 3 | 5:00 | Louisville, Kentucky, United States | |
| Loss | 13–2 | Alexander Shlemenko | TKO (punches) | Bellator 23 | June 24, 2010 | 1 | 2:45 | Louisville, Kentucky, United States | Bellator Season 2 Middleweight Tournament Final. |
| Win | 13–1 | Eric Schambari | Submission (triangle choke) | Bellator 20 | May 27, 2010 | 1 | 2:29 | San Antonio, Texas, United States | Bellator Season 2 Middleweight Tournament Semifinal. |
| Win | 12–1 | Sean Loeffler | TKO (punches) | Bellator 16 | April 29, 2010 | 1 | 2:43 | Kansas City, Missouri, United States | Bellator Season 2 Middleweight Tournament Quarterfinal. |
| Win | 11–1 | Art Santore | Decision (unanimous) | MFC 23 | December 4, 2009 | 3 | 5:00 | Edmonton, Alberta, Canada | |
| Win | 10–1 | Matt Horwich | Decision (unanimous) | Bellator 10 | June 5, 2009 | 3 | 5:00 | Ontario, California, United States | |
| Win | 9–1 | Rory Singer | TKO (punches) | MFC 20 | February 20, 2009 | 1 | 4:56 | Enoch, Alberta, Canada | |
| Win | 8–1 | Spencer Canup | KO (punches) | Carolina Fight Promotions: The Carolina Crown | October 11, 2008 | 1 | 0:59 | Raleigh, North Carolina, United States | |
| Win | 7–1 | Gary Padilla | Decision (unanimous) | JG and TKT Promotions: Fighting 4 Kidz | August 30, 2008 | 3 | 5:00 | Santa Monica, California, United States | |
| Loss | 6–1 | Chael Sonnen | Decision (unanimous) | WEC 33: Marshall vs. Stann | March 26, 2008 | 3 | 5:00 | Las Vegas, Nevada, United States | |
| Win | 6–0 | Eric Schambari | Decision (split) | WEC 31 | December 12, 2007 | 3 | 5:00 | Las Vegas, Nevada, United States | |
| Win | 5–0 | Jesse Forbes | TKO (punches) | WEC 30 | September 5, 2007 | 1 | 4:15 | Las Vegas, Nevada, United States | |
| Win | 4–0 | Reggie Orr | TKO (punches) | KOTC: Collision Course | August 5, 2007 | 1 | 2:53 | San Jacinto, California, United States | |
| Win | 3–0 | Geoff Hawks | TKO (punches) | Total Fighting Alliance 6 | April 28, 2007 | 1 | 2:10 | Santa Monica, California, United States | |
| Win | 2–0 | Jesse Juarez | Submission (rear-naked choke) | Chaos in the Cage 2 | April 6, 2007 | 3 | 1:38 | San Bernardino, California, United States | |
| Win | 1–0 | Scott Rose | Submission (punches) | Cage of Fire 5 | January 27, 2007 | 1 | 1:14 | Tijuana, Mexico | |

== See also ==
- List of male mixed martial artists
