= Charlie Valencia =

American martial artist

- Born: Carlos Enrique Valencia; October 31, 1974 (age 51); Los Angeles, California, United States
- Height: 5 ft 3 in (1.60 m)
- Weight: 135 lb (61 kg; 9.6 st)
- Division: Bantamweight
- Fighting out of: Ontario, California, United States
- Team: Valencia Freestyle Fighting
- Years active: 2000–2002; 2003–2011

Mixed martial arts record
- Total: 19
- Wins: 12
- By knockout: 1
- By submission: 5
- By decision: 6
- Losses: 7
- By knockout: 3
- By submission: 3
- By decision: 1

Other information
- Mixed martial arts record from Sherdog

Carlos Enrique "Charlie" Valencia (born October 31, 1974) is an American mixed martial artist. He has fought for the WEC and UFC in their Bantamweight divisions, and is the former King of the Cage Bantamweight Champion. He is one of only three men to ever finish Ian McCall in a professional MMA fight.

== Background ==
Valencia grew up in Rosemead, California, as the son of a machinist for an aerospace company and a stay-at-home mother. He has three brothers, two older and one younger. He attended Mark Keppel High in Monterey Park, California. He took sixth in the state championships in his senior year. After high school, he went on to East Los Angeles College where he won a junior college state championship. He moved on to Fresno State where he had a successful career on the Bulldogs wrestling team. He graduated from Fresno State in 1995.

== Mixed martial arts career ==
Valencia made his WEC debut on March 24, 2007, at WEC 26: Condit vs. Alessio and was victorious over Antonio Banuelos via KO. Valencia defeated Ian McCall at WEC 31 via submission (guillotine choke) at 3:19 of the first round. He most recently defeated Coty Wheeler on October 10, 2009, at WEC 43.

Valencia most recently defeated Japanese striker Akitoshi Tamura on January 10, 2010, at WEC 46.

Valencia was scheduled to face former WEC Bantamweight Champion Eddie Wineland on June 20, 2010, at WEC 49, but Valencia was forced off the card with an injury.

Valencia faced former WEC Bantamweight Champion Miguel Torres on September 30, 2010, at WEC 51. He lost the fight via submission in the second round.

=== Ultimate Fighting Championship ===
On October 28, 2010, World Extreme Cagefighting merged with the Ultimate Fighting Championship. As part of the merger, all WEC fighters were transferred to the UFC.

Valencia faced Ivan Menjivar on April 30, 2011, at UFC 129. Valencia lost via first round TKO after a series of elbow strikes and punches.

After the loss, Valencia was released from the promotion.

== Personal life ==
Valencia and his wife Cris have three children.

== Championships and accomplishments ==
- King of the Cage
  - KOTC Bantamweight Championship (one time)

== Mixed martial arts record ==
Professional record breakdown
19 matches	12 wins	7 losses
By knockout	1	3
By submission	5	3
By decision	6	1

Res.	Record	Opponent	Method	Event	Date	Round	Time	Location	Notes
Loss	12–7	Ivan Menjivar	TKO (elbow and punches)	UFC 129	April 30, 2011	1	1:30	Toronto, Ontario, Canada	
Loss	12–6	Miguel Torres	Submission (rear-naked choke)	WEC 51	September 30, 2010	2	2:25	Broomfield, Colorado, United States	
Win	12–5	Akitoshi Tamura	Decision (split)	WEC 46	January 10, 2010	3	5:00	Sacramento, California, United States	
Win	11–5	Coty Wheeler	Decision (unanimous)	WEC 43	October 10, 2009	3	5:00	San Antonio, Texas, United States	
Win	10–5	Seth Dikun	Decision (unanimous)	WEC 38	January 25, 2009	3	5:00	San Diego, California, United States	
Loss	9–5	Dominick Cruz	Decision (unanimous)	WEC 34: Faber vs. Pulver	July 1, 2008	3	5:00	Sacramento, California, United States	
Loss	9–4	Yoshiro Maeda	KO (kick to the body)	WEC 32: Condit vs. Prater	February 13, 2008	1	2:29	Rio Rancho, New Mexico, United States	
Win	9–3	Ian McCall	Submission (guillotine choke)	WEC 31	December 12, 2007	1	3:19	Las Vegas, Nevada, United States	
Loss	8–3	Brian Bowles	Submission (rear-naked choke)	WEC 28	June 3, 2007	2	2:50	Las Vegas, Nevada, United States	
Win	8–2	Antonio Banuelos	KO (punch)	WEC 26: Condit vs. Alessio	March 24, 2007	1	3:12	Las Vegas, Nevada, United States	
Loss	7–2	Cub Swanson	TKO (punches)	KOTC: BOOYAA	October 13, 2006	1	4:52	San Jacinto, California, United States	Featherweight bout.
Loss	7–1	Urijah Faber	Submission (rear-naked choke)	KOTC: Predator	May 13, 2006	1	3:09	Globe, Arizona, United States	For the KOTC Bantamweight Championship.
Win	7–0	Del Hawkins	Submission (rear-naked choke)	KOTC: The Return 2	March 25, 2006	1	2:04	San Jacinto, California, United States	
Win	6–0	Bobby Gamboa	Decision	KOTC 33: After Shock	February 20, 2004	3	5:00	San Jacinto, California, United States	
Win	5–0	Greg Mayer	Submission (heel hook)	KOTC 29: Renegades	September 5, 2003	2	1:43	San Jacinto, California, United States	
Win	4–0	David Velasquez	Submission (rear-naked choke)	KOTC 12: Cold Blood	February 9, 2002	1	4:43	San Jacinto, California, United States	Won the vacant KOTC Bantamweight Championship. Later vacated title.
Win	3–0	Bobby Gamboa	Submission (injury)	KOTC 11: Domination	September 29, 2001	1	0:41	San Jacinto, California, United States	
Win	2–0	David Velasquez	Decision (unanimous)	GC 2: Collision at Colusa	February 18, 2001	3	5:00	Colusa, California, United States	
Win	1–0	Octavio Moreles	Decision (unanimous)	CFF: Cobra Open	March 11, 2000	N/A	N/A	Anza, California, United States	
