= Marcus Hicks =

American mixed martial arts fighter

- Born: November 25, 1975 (age 50); Lewisville, Texas, United States
- Other names: The Wrecking Ball
- Nationality: American
- Height: 5 ft 6 in (1.68 m)
- Weight: 155 lb (70 kg; 11.1 st)
- Division: Welterweight; Lightweight
- Reach: 64 in (160 cm)
- Fighting out of: Lewisville, Texas, United States
- Team: Hicks MMA; GG Boxing
- Rank: Black belt in Brazilian Jiu-Jitsu
- Years active: 2002-2010, 2012, 2014

Professional boxing record
- Total: 10
- Wins: 5
- By knockout: 2
- Losses: 4
- By knockout: 1
- Draws: 1

Mixed martial arts record
- Total: 15
- Wins: 10
- By knockout: 2
- By submission: 8
- Losses: 4
- By knockout: 2
- By decision: 2
- No contests: 1

Other information
- Mixed martial arts record from Sherdog

Marcus Dewayne Hicks (born November 25, 1975) is an American mixed martial artist who last competed in 2014. A professional since 2002, he is perhaps best remembered for his six-fight stint in the WEC, but also competed for Legacy FC.

== Mixed martial arts career ==
=== Early career ===
Hicks made his professional mixed martial arts debut on January 26, 2002, defeating Ben Hand at Rocky Mountain Slammer 1 via armbar submission. Following this win, Hicks would compile a record of 5–0 before signing with WEC.

=== World Extreme Cagefighting ===
After winning his first three fights in the WEC by guillotine choke, Hicks fought Jamie Varner for the WEC Lightweight Championship losing by TKO in the first round.

Hicks next fought former WEC lightweight champion Rob McCullough at WEC 39 on March 1, 2009, losing by majority decision.

In his fight at WEC 42 on August 9, 2009, Hicks lost to Shane Roller by unanimous decision. After his loss to Roller, Hicks was subsequently released from the promotion.

=== Legacy FC ===
After being away from the sport for two and a half years, Hicks returned to face Kamaru Usman at Legacy FC 33 on July 18, 2014. He lost the fight via TKO in the second round.

== Personal life ==
Marcus has a daughter.

== Mixed martial arts record ==
Professional record breakdown
15 matches	10 wins	4 losses
By knockout	2	2
By submission	8	0
By decision	0	2
No contests	1	

Res.	Record	Opponent	Method	Event	Date	Round	Time	Location	Notes
Loss	10–4 (1)	Kamaru Usman	TKO (punches)	Legacy FC 33	July 18, 2014	2	5:00	Dallas, Texas, United States	
Win	10–3 (1)	Joshua Lee	Submission (guillotine choke)	EF: Element Fighting	January 14, 2012	2	0:42	Plano, Texas, United States	Welterweight debut.
Win	9–3 (1)	Anthony Macias	Submission (armbar)	Supreme Warrior Championship	April 3, 2010	1	2:30	Frisco, Texas, United States	
Loss	8–3 (1)	Shane Roller	Decision (unanimous)	WEC 42	August 9, 2009	3	5:00	Las Vegas, Nevada, United States	Catchweight (159 lb) bout; Hicks missed weight.
Loss	8–2 (1)	Rob McCullough	Decision (majority)	WEC 39	March 1, 2009	3	5:00	Corpus Christi, Texas, United States	
Loss	8–1 (1)	Jamie Varner	TKO (punches)	WEC 35: Condit vs. Miura	August 3, 2008	1	2:08	Las Vegas, Nevada, United States	For the WEC Lightweight Championship.
Win	8–0 (1)	Ed Ratcliff	Submission (guillotine choke)	WEC 33: Marshall vs. Stann	March 26, 2008	1	1:42	Las Vegas, Nevada, United States	
Win	7–0 (1)	Scott McAfee	Submission (guillotine choke)	WEC 30	September 5, 2007	1	2:15	Las Vegas, Nevada, United States	
Win	6–0 (1)	Sergio Gomez	Submission (guillotine choke)	WEC 27	May 12, 2007	2	3:20	Las Vegas, Nevada, United States	
Win	5–0 (1)	Hector Munoz	TKO (punches)	Ultimate Texas Showdown 4	February 25, 2006	2	0:10	Texas, United States	
Win	4–0 (1)	Frank Kirmse	Submission	Inferno Promotions: Meltdown	June 24, 2005	1	N/A	Plano, Texas, United States	
NC	3–0 (1)	Fred Leavy	No Contest (premature stoppage)	Venom - First Strike	September 18, 2004	1	5:00	Huntington Beach, California, United States	
Win	3–0	Keith Wilson	TKO (cut)	King of the Rockies	January 3, 2004	2	1:12	Fort Collins, Colorado, United States	
Win	2–0	Tony Tucci	Submission (strikes)	ISCF: Anarchy in August	August 2, 2003	1	N/A	Atlanta, Georgia, United States	
Win	1–0	Ben Hand	Submission (armbar)	Rocky Mountain Slammer 1	January 26, 2002	2	1:23	Colorado Springs, Colorado, United States	
