= Logan Clark =

American mixed martial arts fighter (born 1985)

- Born: February 16, 1985 (age 41); Rochester, Minnesota, United States
- Other names: The Pink Pounder
- Height: 6 ft 2 in (1.88 m)
- Weight: 185 lb (84 kg; 13.2 st)
- Division: Middleweight; Heavyweight (2009)
- Reach: 75.0 in (191 cm)
- Fighting out of: Eyota, Minnesota, United States
- Team: Minnesota Martial Arts Academy; Compound MMA
- Years active: 2005–present

Mixed martial arts record
- Total: 24
- Wins: 18
- By knockout: 4
- By submission: 10
- By decision: 3
- Unknown: 1
- Losses: 6
- By knockout: 2
- By submission: 2
- By decision: 2

Other information
- Mixed martial arts record from Sherdog

Logan Thomas Clark (born February 16, 1985, in Rochester, Minnesota) is an American professional mixed martial artist who has fought in the UFC and has also competed for the World Extreme Cagefighting and World Victory Road.

== Biography and fighting career ==
Born in southeastern Minnesota, Clark was raised on a farm north of Dover, MN. In 1987, at the age of 1, Clark's father died leaving his mother to raise the family. Clark has three siblings: Tyrel Clark, Doron Clark, and Amanda Clark. In 1993, his family moved to Eyota, MN.

After graduating from Dover-Eyota High School, where he was coached by Minnesota Wrestling Hall of Fame coach Mike Mazzitelli, Clark attended Hamline University in Saint Paul, MN for one year and was a member of the football and track teams. He then transferred to Saint Cloud State University where he was a part of the wrestling team. After one semester, he left to attend Rochester Community and Technical College for one semester before transferring to Winona State University in the fall of 2005. He graduated with a bachelor's degree in Communication Arts & Literature and is an English teacher at Dover-Eyota High School.

Clark is a mixed martial artist and a coach with Compound MMA, a team of fighters that compete in mixed martial arts (MMA). His training time is split between Compound MMA and the Minnesota Martial Arts Academy in Brooklyn Center, MN. Clark's MMA style is freestyle wrestling and ground and pound and as of August 2012 he had an MMA record of 17–5, he has only been knocked unconscious once in his career, against journeyman and current Bellator MMA fighter Jason Guida brother of current UFC veteran and former Strikeforce champion Clay Guida.

== Mixed martial arts record ==
Professional record breakdown
24 matches	18 wins	6 losses
By knockout	4	2
By submission	10	2
By decision	3	2
Unknown	1	0

Res.	Record	Opponent	Method	Event	Date	Round	Time	Location	Notes
Loss	18–6	Lucio Linhares	Submission (rear-naked choke)	Fight Festival 33	October 5, 2013	2	4:30	Helsinki, Finland	
Win	18–5	Ryan Scheeper	Submission (punches)	Brutaal - Fight Night	March 30, 2013	1	0:39	Rochester, Minnesota, United States	
Win	17–5	Jake Doerr	Submission (triangle choke)	3 River Throwdown - Onalaska	August 4, 2012	2	1:08	Onalaska, Wisconsin, United States	
Win	16–5	Marcus Sursa	Submission (armbar)	Brutaal - Rochester	March 31, 2012	1	2:03	Rochester, Minnesota, United States	
Win	15–5	B.J. Lacy	Submission (rear-naked choke)	CFX - Hostile	October 21, 2011	3	1:33	Morton, Minnesota, United States	
Loss	14–5	Anthony Smith	TKO (doctor stoppage)	Seconds Out / Vivid MMA - Havoc at the Hyatt 2	June 19, 2010	2	2:22	Minneapolis, Minnesota, United States	
Win	14–4	Shane DeZee	Submission (hammerlock)	Seconds Out / Vivid MMA - Havoc at the Hyatt: Clark vs. DeZee	March 27, 2010	1	1:10	Minneapolis, Minnesota, United States	
Win	13–4	Chris Barden	TKO (punches)	Gladiators MMA	January 30, 2010	1	1:20	Rochester, Minnesota, United States	
Loss	12–4	Jason Guida	KO (punches)	Fight Nation: Guida vs. Clark	October 3, 2009	1	0:07	Rochester, Minnesota, United States	Fought at Heavyweight
Loss	12–3	Jorge Santiago	Submission (arm triangle choke)	World Victory Road Presents: Sengoku 5	September 28, 2008	2	3:35	Tokyo, Japan	
Loss	12–2	Kazuo Misaki	Decision (unanimous)	World Victory Road Presents: Sengoku 3	June 8, 2008	3	5:00	Saitama, Japan	
Win	12–1	Scott Harper	TKO (punches)	WEC 33: Marshall vs. Stann	March 26, 2008	1	4:37	Las Vegas, Nevada, United States	
Loss	11–1	Eric Schambari	Decision (unanimous)	WEC 29	August 5, 2007	3	5:00	Las Vegas, Nevada, United States	
Win	11–0	Blas Avena	TKO (elbows)	WEC 25	January 20, 2007	3	4:23	Las Vegas, Nevada, United States	
Win	10–0	Steve Byrnes	Decision (unanimous)	UFC Fight Night: Sanchez vs. Riggs	December 13, 2006	3	5:00	San Diego, California, United States	
Win	9–0	Ryan Willete	Decision (unanimous)	Extreme Challenge 72	October 21, 2006	3	5:00	Medina, Minnesota, United States	
Win	8–0	Chuck Parmelee	TKO (punches)	The Cage Inc.	September 2, 2006	1	2:51	South Dakota, United States	
Win	7–0	B.J. Lacy	Decision (unanimous)	UCS 15 - Battle at the Barn	July 15, 2006	3	3:00	Rochester, Minnesota, United States	
Win	6–0	Dave Morin	N/A	EFX - Fury	June 7, 2006	1	N/A	Maplewood, Minnesota, United States	
Win	5–0	Brandon Nelson	TKO (punches)	UCS 13 - Battle at the Barn	March 25, 2006	1	N/A	Minnesota, United States	
Win	4–0	Fidel Zapata	TKO (punches)	UCS 12 - Battle at the Barn	January 21, 2006	1	N/A	Minnesota, United States	
Win	3–0	Noah Liebenauer	TKO (punches)	Coliseum	November 23, 2005	1	0:58	Rochester, Minnesota, United States	
Win	2–0	Paul Hersch	TKO (punches)	UCS - Ultimate Lacrosse 1	October 15, 2005	1	N/A	La Crosse, Wisconsin, United States	
Win	1–0	Caleb Steiger	Submission (armbar)	Ring Warriors - Xtreme Fight Night	October 7, 2005	1	1:30	La Crosse, Wisconsin, United States	

== See also ==
- Mixed martial arts
