= Hiromitsu Miura =

Japanese mixed martial arts fighter (1981–2024)

- Born: September 22, 1981; Ukiha, Fukuoka, Japan
- Died: October 26, 2024 (aged 43)
- Native name: 三浦広光
- Nationality: Japanese
- Height: 5 ft 9 in (1.75 m)
- Weight: 171 lb (78 kg; 12.2 st)
- Division: Super Middleweight (Boxing); Welterweight (MMA); Middleweight (MMA)
- Style: Boxing, Judo, Kickboxing, Sambo
- Stance: Orthodox
- Fighting out of: Tokyo, Japan
- Team: Teiken Boxing Gym (Boxing); SAMURAI SWORD (MMA)
- Trainer: Yūichi Kasai (Boxing)
- Rank: 3rd Dan Black Belt in Judo
- Years active: 2010–2012 (Boxing); 2004–2009, 2015–2024 present (MMA)

Professional boxing record
- Total: 10
- Wins: 9
- By knockout: 5
- Losses: 1
- By knockout: 1

Mixed martial arts record
- Total: 21
- Wins: 13
- By knockout: 9
- By submission: 0
- By decision: 4
- Losses: 8
- By knockout: 7
- By decision: 1

Other information
- Boxing record from BoxRec
- Mixed martial arts record from Sherdog

Hiromitsu Miura (Japanese: 三浦 広光, Miura Hiromitsu; September 22, 1981 – October 26, 2024) was a Japanese mixed martial artist who competed in the welterweight division. He was also a former boxer who competed in the light heavyweight division.

== Mixed martial arts career ==
Miura earned a WEC title fight against WEC Welterweight Champion Carlos Condit at WEC 35 on August 3, 2008. As the Japan boxing commission established four weight divisions in September 2009, Miura turned to boxing. After falling in love with his boxing training, Miura had embarked on a professional boxing career and put his mixed martial arts career on hold.

=== Return to MMA ===
In 2015, Miura returned to mixed martial arts. He became the Welterweight King of Pancrase after defeating Akihiro Murayama via unanimous decision at Pancrase 281 on October 2, 2016.

On July 2, 2017, Miura attempted to defend his title against Daichi Abe at Pancrase 288. He lost the fight and the championship via second-round technical knockout.

In the first fight after losing his title, Miura faced Gota Yamashita at Pancrase 309 on October 20, 2019. He won the fight via first-round technical knockout.

Miura then faced Masayuki Kikuiri at Pancrase 322 on July 27, 2021. Miura lost the bout via second-round technical knockout.

== Professional boxing career ==
Miura made his professional boxing debut at the Hard Rock Hotel and Casino, Las Vegas, on April 10, 2010. Then, fighting in Los Angeles, Tokyo and Las Vegas, he beat undefeated Todd Manuel at the Cosmopolitan of Las Vegas on March 25, 2011. Miura successively won over the previously undefeated fellow boxer Shintarō Matsumoto in an eight round bout at the 170 pound (77 kg) limit at the Korakuen Hall in Tokyo on August 6 of the same year. In that month, he was ranked No. 1 in the super middleweight division in Japan. No one but he has been ranked in the newly established four weight divisions yet.

On October 1, 2011, Miura defeated Hector Hernandez via a unanimous decision in a six round super middleweight bout at the MGM Grand Hotel and Casino.

Racking up a 9–0 record in the ring, Miura eventually challenged Yuzo Kiyota for the OPBF Super Middleweight title on October 6, 2012. He lost the bout via technical knockout in the sixth round.

== Death ==
On November 5, 2024, Miura's family announced that he had died on October 16 from acute leukemia, that he had been battling since mid-September. He was 43.

== Mixed martial arts record ==
Professional record breakdown
21 matches	13 wins	8 losses
By knockout	9	7
By decision	4	1

Res.	Record	Opponent	Method	Event	Date	Round	Time	Location	Notes
Loss	13–8	Masayuki Kikuiri	TKO (body kick and punches)	Pancrase 322	June 27, 2021	2	2:31	Tokyo, Japan	
Win	13–7	Gota Yamashita	TKO (punches)	Pancrase 309	October 20, 2019	1	1:08	Tokyo, Japan	
Loss	12–7	Daichi Abe	TKO (punches)	Pancrase 288	July 2, 2017	2	0:26	Tokyo, Japan	Lost the Pancrase Welterweight Championship.
Win	12–6	Akihiro Murayama	Decision (unanimous)	Pancrase 281	October 2, 2016	5	5:00	Tokyo, Japan	Won the Pancrase Welterweight Championship.
Win	11–6	Yuta Nakamura	TKO (punches)	Pancrase 274	December 19, 2015	2	3:39	Tokyo, Japan	
Win	10–6	Toshikazu Suzuki	KO (punches)	Pancrase 271	November 1, 2015	3	0:48	Tokyo, Japan	
Loss	9–6	Edgar García	KO (punches)	WEC 38	January 25, 2009	1	1:18	San Diego, California, United States	
Loss	9–5	Carlos Condit	TKO (punches)	WEC 35: Condit vs. Miura	August 3, 2008	4	4:43	Las Vegas, Nevada, United States	For the WEC Welterweight Championship. Fight of the Night.
Win	9–4	Blas Avena	KO (punches)	WEC 33: Marshall vs. Stann	March 26, 2008	1	2:35	Las Vegas, Nevada, United States	Welterweight debut.
Win	8–4	Fernando Gonzalez	TKO (submission to punches)	WEC 29	August 5, 2007	2	3:35	Las Vegas, Nevada, United States	
Loss	7–4	Jason Miller	Decision (unanimous)	WEC 27	May 12, 2007	3	5:00	Las Vegas, Nevada, United States	
Win	7–3	Ryo Kakigawa	TKO (punches)	Hero's 7	October 9, 2006	1	1:36	Yokohama, Kanagawa, Japan	
Win	6–3	Geovani Pereira	TKO (punches)	W-Capsule: Vol. 2	June 11, 2006	1	2:35	Tokyo, Japan	
Win	5–3	Kazuki Okubo	Decision (unanimous)	W-Capsule: Vol. 1	January 28, 2006	3	5:00	Tokyo, Japan	
Loss	4–3	Kestutis Smirnovas	TKO (punches)	Hero's Lithuania 2005	November 26, 2005	1	4:30	Vilnius, Lithuania	
Loss	4–2	Izuru Takeuchi	TKO (punches)	Hero's 2	July 6, 2005	2	2:35	Tokyo, Japan	
Win	4–1	Genki Ideta	TKO (punches)	Deep: clubDeep Fukuoka: World Best Festival	April 10, 2005	1	0:56	Fukuoka, Japan	
Win	3–1	Hirohide Fujinuma	Decision (unanimous)	Deep: 18th Impact	February 12, 2005	2	5:00	Tokyo, Japan	
Win	2–1	Yun Seob Kwak	TKO (punches)	Pancrase: Brave 10	November 7, 2004	1	0:54	Chiba, Japan	
Win	1–1	Yuichi Nakanishi	Decision (majority)	Pancrase: Brave 8	September 24, 2004	2	5:00	Tokyo, Japan	
Loss	0–1	Joe D'Arce	TKO (kick and punches)	Pancrase: 2004 Neo-Blood Tournament Semifinals	July 25, 2004	2	4:17	Tokyo, Japan	

== Professional boxing record ==
10 fights	9 wins	1 loss
By knockout	4	1
By decision	5	0

No.	Result	Record	Opponent	Type	Round, time	Date	Location	Notes
10	Loss	9–1	(Japan) Yuzo Kiyota	TKO	6 (12), 2:00	Oct 6, 2012	Korakuen Hall, Tokyo, Japan	For the OPBF Super Middleweight Title.
9	Win	9–0	(Fiji) Wahid Khan	KO	2 (8), 1:44	Mar 3, 2012	Korakuen Hall, Tokyo, Japan	
8	Win	8–0	(United States) Hector Hernandez	UD	6	Oct 1, 2011	(United States) MGM Grand Las Vegas, Paradise, Nevada, U.S.	
7	Win	7–0	(Japan) Shintaro Matsumoto	UD	8	Aug 6, 2011	Korakuen Hall, Tokyo, Japan	
6	Win	6–0	(United States) Todd Manuel	UD	6	Mar 25, 2011	(United States) Cosmopolitan of Las Vegas, Paradise, Nevada, U.S.	
5	Win	5–0	(United States) Ramiro Bueno Jr.	TKO	1 (4), 2:20	Feb 26, 2011	(United States) Palms Casino Resort, Paradise, Nevada, U.S.	
4	Win	4–0	(Japan) Kenji Aizawa	TKO	5 (6), 0:21	Dec 4, 2010	Korakuen Hall, Tokyo, Japan	
3	Win	3–0	(Japan) Taka Shirasaka	KO	2 (4), 1:50	Jul 20, 2010	Korakuen Hall, Tokyo, Japan	
2	Win	2–0	(United States) Nathan Bedwell	UD	4	Apr 22, 2010	(United States) Club Nokia, Los Angeles, California, U.S.	
1	Win	1–0	(United States) Isaac Atencio	UD	4	Apr 10, 2010	(United States) Hard Rock Hotel and Casino, Las Vegas, Nevada, U.S.	
