= Ed Ratcliff =

American mixed martial artist

- Born: March 5, 1983 (age 43); Chicago, Illinois, United States
- Other names: 9 mm
- Height: 5 ft 10 in (1.78 m)
- Weight: 155 lb (70 kg; 11.1 st)
- Division: Welterweight; Lightweight
- Reach: 71.5 in (182 cm)
- Fighting out of: San Diego, California, United States
- Team: Purebred Und1sputed; Alliance MMA
- Rank: Black Belt in Karate; Black Belt in Taekwondo
- Years active: 2005-2010

Mixed martial arts record
- Total: 10
- Wins: 7
- By knockout: 5
- By submission: 1
- By decision: 1
- Losses: 3
- By submission: 2
- By decision: 1

Other information
- Mixed martial arts record from Sherdog

Edward Norris Ratcliff (born March 5, 1983) is a retired American professional mixed martial artist. A professional competitor from 2005 until 2010, he fought in the WEC.

== Background ==
Originally from Chicago, Illinois, Ratcliff is African-American but is also of Iroquois Native American descent. Ratcliff was raised alongside his sister by his single mother, Laceine. It was Ratfcliff's mother who was his original martial arts instructor. In elementary school, Ratcliff began Karate and Tae Kwon Do and would eventually earn black belts in both disciplines. At the age of 17, Ratcliff tried out to be a part of Ken Shamrock's gym The Lion's Den in 2001 and made the team.

== Mixed martial arts career ==
=== Early career ===
Ratcliff made his professional MMA debut in 2005 and compiled an undefeated professional record of 4-0 before being signed by the WEC.

=== World Extreme Cagefighting ===
Ratcliff debuted at WEC 27, defeating Johnny Sampaio via TKO (knees) in the second round.

Next, he faced Ultimate Fighter alumni Alex Karalexis and was again victorious via technical knockout. However, Ratcliff suffered his first WEC and professional loss at WEC 33 at the hands of Marcus Hicks via guillotine choke.

Ratcliff then bounced back against Phil Cardella, winning via unanimous decision.

He lost his last fight against Donald Cerrone via submission at WEC 45 on December 19, 2009.

Ratcliff was expected to face Chris Horodecki on June 20, 2010 at WEC 49, but just days before the event, Ratcliff pulled out of the event for undisclosed reasons. Horodecki instead faced WEC newcomer Danny Downes.

The fight between Horodecki and Ratcliff eventually took place on September 30, 2010 at WEC 51. He lost the fight via split decision.

Ratcliff was released by UFC/Zuffa in January 2011.

== Championships and accomplishments ==
- World Extreme Cagefighting
  - Fight of the Night (One time) vs. Donald Cerrone

== Mixed martial arts record ==
Professional record breakdown
| 10 matches | 7 wins | 3 losses |
| By knockout | 5 | 0 |
| By submission | 1 | 2 |
| By decision | 1 | 1 |

| Res. | Record | Opponent | Method | Event | Date | Round | Time | Location | Notes |
|---|---|---|---|---|---|---|---|---|---|
| Loss | 7–3 | Chris Horodecki | Decision (split) | WEC 51 | September 30, 2010 | 3 | 5:00 | Broomfield, Colorado, United States | |
| Loss | 7–2 | Donald Cerrone | Submission (rear naked choke) | WEC 45 | December 19, 2009 | 3 | 3:47 | Las Vegas, Nevada, United States | Fight of the Night. |
| Win | 7–1 | Phil Cardella | Decision (unanimous) | WEC 42 | August 9, 2009 | 3 | 5:00 | Las Vegas, Nevada, United States | |
| Loss | 6–1 | Marcus Hicks | Submission (guillotine choke) | WEC 33: Marshall vs. Stann | March 26, 2008 | 1 | 1:42 | Las Vegas, Nevada, United States | |
| Win | 6–0 | Alex Karalexis | TKO (punches) | WEC 31 | December 12, 2007 | 2 | 1:26 | Las Vegas, Nevada, United States | |
| Win | 5–0 | Johnny Sampaio | TKO (knees) | WEC 27 | May 12, 2007 | 2 | 5:00 | Las Vegas, Nevada, United States | |
| Win | 4–0 | Chris Reed | TKO (corner stoppage) | TC 18: Nightmare | November 4, 2006 | 2 | 5:00 | San Diego, California, United States | |
| Win | 3–0 | Jamie Schmidt | TKO (strikes) | TC 14: Throwdown | May 13, 2006 | 2 | 1:14 | Del Mar, California, United States | Return to Lightweight. |
| Win | 2–0 | Brett Cooper | KO (spinning heel kick) | TC 12: Total Combat 12 | December 17, 2005 | 2 | N/A | Tijuana, Mexico | Welterweight debut. |
| Win | 1–0 | Josh Olivas | Submission (armbar) | TC 9: Total Combat 9 | July 30, 2005 | 1 | N/A | Tijuana, Mexico | |
