= Alex Karalexis =

American mixed martial arts fighter

- Born: Alexander Karalexis; September 20, 1977 (age 49); Boston, Massachusetts, U.S.
- Other names: The Assassin, T-Rex
- Height: 5 ft 8 in (1.73 m)
- Weight: 170 lb (77 kg; 12 st)
- Division: Lightweight; Welterweight; Middleweight
- Fighting out of: Boston, Massachusetts, United States
- Team: Team Sityodtong
- Years active: 2003–2011

Mixed martial arts record
- Total: 16
- Wins: 10
- By knockout: 5
- By submission: 1
- By decision: 4
- Losses: 6
- By knockout: 3
- By submission: 2
- By decision: 1

Other information
- Mixed martial arts record from Sherdog

Alexander Karalexis (born September 20, 1977) is an American retired professional mixed martial artist. A professional from 2003 until 2011, Karalexis was a contestant on The Ultimate Fighter 1, and competed for the UFC and WEC.

== Background ==
Karalexis was raised in Hanson, Massachusetts, and is of Greek descent, as his father is an immigrant from Greece who also fought in the Special Forces. Karalexis began playing soccer when he was six years old, and was talented, going on to be the MVP of the Massachusetts All-Star Game, and also competed in wrestling for all four years Whitman-Hanson Regional High School.

Karalexis then attended Massasoit Community College where he continued playing soccer for one year before being sidelined for the next season due to a recurring leg injury. When he became healthy, Karalexis began playing professionally for the Cape Cod Crusaders but again only played one season before being sidelined from the same injury. After the injury did not heal properly, Karalexis ventured into kickboxing and Brazilian jiu-jitsu before transitioning into mixed martial arts.

== Mixed martial arts career ==
=== The Ultimate Fighter ===
Karalexis competed on The Ultimate Fighter 1 as a Middleweight, and was the third Middleweight pick on Team Couture.

After the challenge in the third episode, Team Liddell won the pick and decided to have Diego Sanchez fight Karalexis in the very first Middleweight fight of the series. Karalexis was defeated via rear-naked choke submission in the first round and was eliminated from the show.

Karalexis later made a return for the series finale as a Welterweight to defeat Josh Rafferty via TKO in the first round. Karalexis then lost his next two fights in the UFC against Kenny Florian and Jason Von Flue, respectively, before being signed by the WEC.

=== WEC ===
Traditionally a Welterweight, Karalexis dropped down a weight class in order to compete in the Lightweight division. Karalexis' first Lightweight bout was on June 3, 2007, at WEC 28, where he defeated Josh Smith by majority decision.

Karalexis was scheduled to face WEC newcomer Kamal Shalorus on November 18, 2009, at WEC 44., but a broken hand suffered in training has forced Karalexis off the card.

Karalexis was expected to face Zach Micklewright on April 24, 2010, at WEC 48, but Micklewright was forced off the card with an injury. Karalexis instead faced Anthony Pettis, losing via submission.

Karalexis was expected to face WEC newcomer Zhang Tie Quan on September 30, 2010, at WEC 51. However, Karalexis was forced out of the bout with an injury and replaced by Jason Reinhardt. Reinhardt was subsequently injured in training himself, and replaced by Pablo Garza

Following the UFC/WEC merger in December 2010, Karalexis was released by Zuffa, LLC, having lost 3 of his last 4 WEC fights. He would return to action on June 10, 2011, in a Welterweight bout against Tiawan Howard at CES MMA VI: Nowhere To Hide, losing via a controversial split decision. After the fight, a member of Howard's corner bumped into Karalexis, inciting a brawl that was ended by police.

== Personal life ==
Karalexis is close friends with NFL star Jared Allen, who also trained with Karalexis and cornered his fight at WEC 48 against Anthony Pettis. A native of Boston, Karalexis is a fan of the Boston Red Sox baseball team.

== Mixed martial arts record ==
Professional record breakdown
| 16 matches | 10 wins | 6 losses |
| By knockout | 5 | 3 |
| By submission | 1 | 2 |
| By decision | 4 | 1 |

| Res. | Record | Opponent | Method | Event | Date | Round | Time | Location | Notes |
|---|---|---|---|---|---|---|---|---|---|
| Loss | 10–6 | Tiawan Howard | Decision (split) | CES MMA VI: Nowhere To Hide | June 10, 2011 | 3 | 5:00 | Lincoln, Rhode Island, United States | |
| Loss | 10–5 | Anthony Pettis | Submission (triangle choke) | WEC 48 | April 24, 2010 | 2 | 1:35 | Sacramento, California, United States | |
| Win | 10–4 | Greg McIntyre | TKO (punches) | WEC 39 | March 1, 2009 | 1 | 4:19 | Corpus Christi, Texas, United States | |
| Loss | 9–4 | Bart Palaszewski | TKO (punches) | WEC 37: Torres vs. Tapia | December 3, 2008 | 2 | 1:11 | Las Vegas, Nevada, United States | |
| Loss | 9–3 | Ed Ratcliff | TKO (punches) | WEC 31 | December 12, 2007 | 2 | 1:26 | Las Vegas, Nevada, United States | |
| Win | 9–2 | Josh Smith | Decision (majority) | WEC 28 | June 3, 2007 | 3 | 5:00 | Las Vegas, Nevada, United States | |
| Win | 8–2 | Olaf Alfonso | TKO (referee stoppage) | WEC 25 | January 20, 2007 | 2 | 3:53 | Las Vegas, Nevada, United States | |
| Win | 7–2 | Thomas Denny | Decision (unanimous) | WEC 23: Hot August Fights | August 17, 2006 | 3 | 5:00 | Lemoore, California, United States | |
| Win | 6–2 | Josh Lydell | Submission (rear-naked choke) | RF 13: New Hampshire | June 17, 2006 | 1 | N/A | Concord, New Hampshire, United States | |
| Loss | 5–2 | Jason Von Flue | Technical Submission (Von Flue choke) | UFC Fight Night 3 | January 16, 2006 | 3 | 1:17 | Las Vegas, Nevada, United States | |
| Loss | 5–1 | Kenny Florian | TKO (doctor stoppage) | UFC Ultimate Fight Night | August 6, 2005 | 2 | 2:52 | Las Vegas, Nevada, United States | |
| Win | 5–0 | Josh Rafferty | TKO (strikes) | The Ultimate Fighter 1 Finale | April 9, 2005 | 1 | 1:40 | Las Vegas, Nevada, United States | |
| Win | 4–0 | Mike Littlefield | Decision (unanimous) | Mass Destruction 15 | February 21, 2004 | 2 | 4:00 | Boston, Massachusetts, United States | |
| Win | 3–0 | Ted Govola | KO | Mass Destruction 13 | October 25, 2003 | 1 | N/A | Taunton, Massachusetts, United States | |
| Win | 2–0 | Mike Varner | Decision (unanimous) | Mass Destruction 11 | June 7, 2003 | 3 | 5:00 | Taunton, Massachusetts, United States | |
| Win | 1–0 | Julio Colon | TKO (corner stoppage) | Mass Destruction 10 | January 25, 2003 | 1 | 4:00 | Taunton, Massachusetts, United States | |
