= Blas Avena =

American mixed martial arts fighter

- Born: June 30, 1983; Bell, California, U.S.
- Died: May 4, 2016 (aged 32); Las Vegas, Nevada, United States
- Other names: The Disciple
- Nationality: American
- Height: 6 ft 3 in (1.91 m)
- Weight: 171 lb (78 kg; 12.2 st)
- Division: Middleweight; Welterweight
- Stance: Orthodox
- Fighting out of: Las Vegas, Nevada, United States
- Team: Machado Jiu-Jitsu
- Rank: Black belt in Brazilian Jiu-Jitsu
- Years active: 2005-2016

Mixed martial arts record
- Total: 16
- Wins: 8
- By knockout: 2
- By submission: 6
- Losses: 7
- By knockout: 7
- No contests: 1

Other information
- Mixed martial arts record from Sherdog

Blas Avena (June 30, 1983 – May 4, 2016) was an American mixed martial artist. A professional competitor from 2005 until 2016, Avena competed for the WEC and Bellator. Known for his exciting fighting style, none of his 16 career bouts made it to a decision.

== Mixed martial arts career ==
=== Early career ===
Avena relocated from Southern California to Las Vegas in 2004 to work as a security guard for the Hard Rock Hotel & Casino and later made his professional MMA debut in 2005. Avena compiled an overall record of 3-0 before being signed by the WEC.

=== World Extreme Cagefighting ===
Avena made his promotional debut at WEC 25 against Logan Clark on January 20, 2007. Avena lost via TKO in the third round.

After the loss at WEC 25, Avena decided to drop down to the welterweight division and faced Tiki Ghosn on August 5, 2007 at WEC 29. Avena won via rear-naked choke submission in the first round. Avena followed this up with another first-round submission win over Joe Benoit at WEC 30 before dropping his next fight against Hiromitsu Miura at WEC 33 on March 26, 2008 via first-round knockout.

Avena made his next appearance at WEC 35 against Dave Terrel on August 3, 2008 and won via first-round TKO. Avena then faced Jesse Lennox on January 25, 2009 at WEC 38. Avena was defeated via second-round knockout and subsequently released from the promotion.

=== Bellator MMA ===
After his release from the WEC, Avena went 1-3 with one no contest before being signed by Bellator. Avena made his promotional debut against Lenny Lovato February 28, 2013 at Bellator 91 and won via first-round knockout.

Avena then faced War Machine at Bellator 96 on June 19, 2013. Avena was defeated via first-round TKO.

== Death ==
On the morning of May 4, 2016, Avena's body was discovered by police in his Las Vegas apartment. A cause of death was not immediately disclosed, however it was being investigated as a suicide.

== Mixed martial arts record ==
Professional record breakdown
16 matches	8 wins	7 losses
By knockout	2	7
By submission	6	0
No contests	1	

Res.	Record	Opponent	Method	Event	Date	Round	Time	Location	Notes
Loss	8–7 (1)	War Machine	TKO (punches)	Bellator 96	June 19, 2013	1	3:55	Thackerville, Oklahoma, United States	
Win	8–6 (1)	Lenny Lovato	TKO (punch)	Bellator 91	February 28, 2013	1	1:40	Rio Rancho, New Mexico, United States	
Loss	7–6 (1)	Brock Jardine	TKO (punches)	Showdown Fights: Uprising	May 4, 2012	2	2:31	Orem, Utah, United States	
NC	7–5 (1)	Shawn Fitzsimmons	No Contest	Superior Cage Combat 3	November 4, 2011	2	3:42	Las Vegas, Nevada, United States	Catchweight (173 lbs); Avena missed weight.
Loss	7–5	Josh Neer	TKO (punches & elbows)	Superior Cage Combat 2	August 20, 2011	1	2:54	Las Vegas, Nevada, United States	
Win	7–4	Kenny Marzola	Submission (rear-naked choke)	MMA Xplosion: Super Fight Night	February 20, 2010	1	1:34	Las Vegas, Nevada, United States	
Loss	6–4	Dave Hulett	TKO (punches)	MMA Xplosion: Gunderson vs. Sharp	October 10, 2009	1	3:08	Las Vegas, Nevada, United States	
Loss	6–3	Jesse Lennox	KO (knee and punches)	WEC 38	January 25, 2009	2	0:41	San Diego, California, United States	
Win	6–2	Dave Terrel	TKO (punches)	WEC 35	August 3, 2008	1	1:07	Las Vegas, Nevada, United States	
Loss	5–2	Hiromitsu Miura	KO (punches)	WEC 33	March 26, 2008	1	2:35	Las Vegas, Nevada, United States	
Win	5–1	Joe Benoit	Submission (guillotine choke)	WEC 30	September 5, 2007	1	0:29	Las Vegas, Nevada, United States	
Win	4–1	Tiki Ghosn	Submission (rear-naked choke)	WEC 29	August 5, 2007	1	1:01	Las Vegas, Nevada, United States	Return to Welterweight.
Loss	3–1	Logan Clark	TKO (elbows)	WEC 25	January 20, 2007	3	4:23	Las Vegas, Nevada, United States	Middleweight debut.
Win	3–0	Brandon Melendez	Submission (guillotine choke)	UCE: Round 16: Finals	August 27, 2005	2	N/A	Salt Lake City, Utah, United States	
Win	2–0	Jake Paul	Submission (guillotine choke)	UCE: Round 14: Finals	April 23, 2005	1	2:59	West Valley City, Utah, United States	
Win	1–0	Benjamin Garcia	Submission (guillotine choke)	UCE: Round 13: Episode 3	January 22, 2005	1	0:18	Sandy, Utah, United States	
