= Brian Bowles (fighter) =

American mixed martial arts fighter

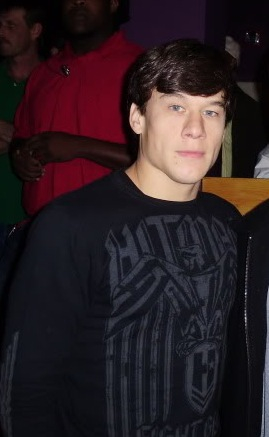
- Born: Brian David Bowles; June 22, 1980 (age 46); Charleston, West Virginia, United States
- Height: 5 ft 7 in (1.70 m)
- Weight: 135 lb (61 kg; 9.6 st)
- Division: Bantamweight
- Reach: 70 1/2 in (179 cm)
- Fighting out of: Athens, Georgia, United States
- Team: The HardCore Gym (now SBG Athens)
- Trainer: Adam Singer & Rory Singer
- Rank: Black belt in Brazilian Jiu-Jitsu
- Years active: 2006–2013

Mixed martial arts record
- Total: 13
- Wins: 10
- By knockout: 3
- By submission: 6
- By decision: 1
- Losses: 3
- By knockout: 2
- By submission: 1

Other information
- Mixed martial arts record from Sherdog

Brian Bowles (born June 22, 1980) is a retired American mixed martial artist who most recently competed in the Bantamweight division of the Ultimate Fighting Championship. A professional competitor from 2006 to 2013, Bowles is also the former WEC Bantamweight Champion.

== Background ==
Bowles was born in Charleston, West Virginia and raised in the small town of Chesapeake, West Virginia by his single mother. Bowles' father, who was largely absent from his life, died when Bowles was 11 years old. In the tenth grade, Bowles moved to Jackson County, Georgia, attending Jackson County Comprehensive High School where he competed in wrestling for three years. Bowles was later introduced to mixed martial arts by a former teammate after graduating, and began training at The HardCore Gym which has since been renamed to SBG Athens.

== Mixed martial arts career ==
=== Early career ===
Bowles compiled an undefeated 7-0 amateur record and began his professional career in regional promotions, earning two first-round stoppages and amassing an undefeated record of 3-0.

=== World Extreme Cagefighting ===
In his first two fights in the organization, he submitted Charlie Valencia with a rear-naked choke and knocked out Marcos Galvao at WEC 31 with a flurry that stunned his opponent and a strong right hook to finish, both ending within minutes of the second round, showcasing his proficiency in striking and submission offense (with a primarily wrestling base).

At WEC 35 he finished fellow Bantamweight contender Damacio Page with an impressive first-round guillotine choke he locked in while his opponent was still standing. It was near the end of 2008 where Bowles would have his most notable victory in the organization yet, defeating Will Ribeiro (who was 10-1 at that time) in the third round via another guillotine choke, on the WEC 37 main card. He was then scheduled to headline WEC 40 in a bout with Miguel Torres, but was forced to withdraw due to a back injury weeks before the event, and was replaced by top ten bantamweight Takeya Mizugaki. Torres successfully defended his belt against Mizugaki.

Torres and Bowles headlined WEC 42 on August 9, 2009 at the Hard Rock Hotel and Casino in Las Vegas, Nevada. Bowles defeated Torres via first-round KO to become the new WEC Bantamweight Champion.

Bowles made his first title defense against Dominick Cruz on March 6, 2010 at WEC 47. Bowles lost via TKO (doctor stoppage) at the end of the second round with a broken hand.

Bowles was expected to face Wagnney Fabiano on November 11, 2010 at WEC 52. However, Bowles was forced off the card with a foot injury.

=== Ultimate Fighting Championship ===
On October 28, 2010, World Extreme Cagefighting merged with the Ultimate Fighting Championship. As part of the merger, all WEC fighters were transferred to the UFC.

Bowles faced former opponent Damacio Page on March 3, 2011 at UFC Live: Sanchez vs. Kampmann. In what Joe Rogan described as " a comet that comes around every 1,000 years," Bowles defeated Page by guillotine choke at 3:30 of the first round, the same method and exact time that he defeated Page in their first meeting.

Bowles faced Takeya Mizugaki on July 2, 2011 at UFC 132. He won the fight via unanimous decision (30–27, 30–27, and 29–28), making this the first time he has gone to a decision in his career.

Bowles faced off against Urijah Faber on November 19, 2011 at UFC 139. He lost the fight by submission (guillotine choke) in the second round.

Bowles returned from an extended 18-month layoff and faced George Roop on May 25, 2013 at UFC 160. He lost the fight via TKO in the second round.

Bowles failed his UFC 160 drug test with an elevated testosterone-to-epitestosterone (T/E) ratio. The NSAC allows a T/E Ratio of 6:1 and Bowles was over 20:1. Bowles did not appeal the result and was subsequently suspended for nine months and fined $5,700.

Bowles was released from the UFC on March 2, 2015.

== Arrest ==
On January 14, 2015, Bowles along with Rhomney Marie Moon, were arrested and face multiple felony charges in Arcade, Georgia.

== Championships and accomplishments ==
- World Extreme Cagefighting
  - WEC Bantamweight Championship (One time)
  - Knockout of the Night (One time)
  - Submission of the Night (Two times)
- Ultimate Fighting Championship
  - Submission of the Night (One time)
- Cagewriters
  - 2009 Upset of the Year vs. Miguel Torres at WEC 42
- Inside Fights
  - 2009 Upset of the Year vs. Miguel Torres at WEC 42

== Mixed martial arts record ==
Professional record breakdown
13 matches	10 wins	3 losses
By knockout	3	2
By submission	6	1
By decision	1	0

Res.	Record	Opponent	Method	Event	Date	Round	Time	Location	Notes
Loss	10–3	George Roop	TKO (punches)	UFC 160	May 25, 2013	2	1:43	Las Vegas, Nevada, United States	Bowles tested positive for elevated testosterone levels.
Loss	10–2	Urijah Faber	Submission (guillotine choke)	UFC 139	November 19, 2011	2	1:27	San Jose, California, United States	UFC Bantamweight title eliminator.
Win	10–1	Takeya Mizugaki	Decision (unanimous)	UFC 132	July 2, 2011	3	5:00	Las Vegas, Nevada, United States	
Win	9–1	Damacio Page	Technical Submission (guillotine choke)	UFC Live: Sanchez vs. Kampmann	March 3, 2011	1	3:30	Louisville, Kentucky, United States	Submission of the Night.
Loss	8–1	Dominick Cruz	TKO (doctor stoppage)	WEC 47	March 6, 2010	2	5:00	Columbus, Ohio, United States	Lost the WEC Bantamweight Championship. Doctor stoppage due to broken hand.
Win	8–0	Miguel Torres	KO (punches)	WEC 42	August 9, 2009	1	3:57	Las Vegas, Nevada, United States	Won the WEC Bantamweight Championship. Knockout of the Night.
Win	7–0	Will Ribeiro	Submission (guillotine choke)	WEC 37: Torres vs. Tapia	December 3, 2008	3	1:11	Las Vegas, Nevada, United States	Submission of the Night.
Win	6–0	Damacio Page	Submission (guillotine choke)	WEC 35: Condit vs. Miura	August 3, 2008	1	3:30	Las Vegas, Nevada, United States	Submission of the Night.
Win	5–0	Marcos Galvão	KO (punch)	WEC 31	December 12, 2007	2	2:09	Las Vegas, Nevada, United States	
Win	4–0	Charlie Valencia	Submission (rear-naked choke)	WEC 28	June 3, 2007	2	2:33	Las Vegas, Nevada, United States	
Win	3–0	Shane Weinischke	Submission (rear-naked choke)	ISCF: Invasion	February 9, 2007	1	1:38	Atlanta, Georgia, United States	
Win	2–0	Charles Nutt	TKO (punches)	Wild Bill's Fight Night 4	September 8, 2006	1	4:28	Duluth, Georgia, United States	
Win	1–0	Tim Honeycutt	Submission (rear-naked choke)	Wild Bill's Fight Night 2	May 12, 2006	3	4:55	Duluth, Georgia, United States	

== See also ==
- List of male mixed martial artists

Awards and achievements
Preceded by Miguel Torres	4th WEC Bantamweight Champion; August 9, 2009 - March 6, 2010	Succeeded by Dominick Cruz
