= Rob McCullough =

American mixed martial arts fighter

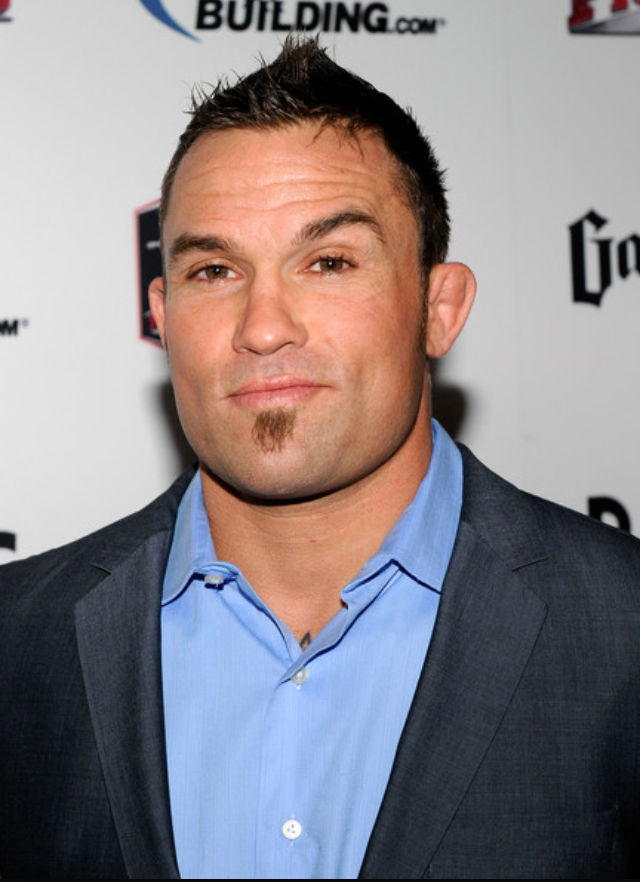
- Rob McCullough attending website Launch Party at "The Kress" Hollywood, CA on May 2, 2009
- Born: May 26, 1977 (age 49); Huntington Beach, California, United States
- Other names: Razor
- Nationality: American
- Height: 5 ft 8 in (1.73 m)
- Weight: 155 lb (70 kg; 11.1 st)
- Division: Lightweight
- Reach: 69 in (175 cm)
- Fighting out of: Huntington Beach, California, United States
- Team: HB Ultimate Training Center
- Rank: Cia Paulista brown belt in Brazilian Jiu-Jitsu
- Years active: 2001–2011

Mixed martial arts record
- Total: 27
- Wins: 19
- By knockout: 11
- By submission: 2
- By decision: 6
- Losses: 8
- By knockout: 2
- By submission: 1
- By decision: 5

Other information
- Mixed martial arts record from Sherdog

Robert Alexander McCullough IV (born May 26, 1977) is an American former Muay Thai kickboxer and professional mixed martial artist. A professional from 2001 to 2011 in MMA, McCullough has formerly competed for the WEC, Bellator, DREAM, the World Fighting Alliance, the Palace Fighting Championship, and King of the Cage. In professional kickboxing, McCullough has competed for K-1.

== Mixed martial arts career ==
=== World Extreme Cagefighting ===
McCullough began his mixed martial arts career with a first-round TKO victory at the Palace Casino in Lemoore, California, in 2001. Between 2003 and 2007, "Razor Rob" went 10-1 with nine stoppage victories and only a split-decision loss to Harris Sarmiento, which he later avenged.

McCullough defeated Muay Thai fighter Kit Cope at WEC 25 to win the vacant WEC Lightweight Championship. He defended the title once by defeating Richard Crunkilton by first-round TKO. On February 13, 2008, he lost his title to Jamie Varner when Varner defeated him by TKO due to strikes in the third round.

After losing his title, McCullough struggled over his next four fights in the now-defunct WEC. He defeated Kenneth Alexander by split decision but then lost to Donald Cerrone. He defeated Marcus Hicks by majority decision, but he fractured his right hand and received minor damage to his ankle and subsequently underwent surgery to repair his hand McCullough was expected to return to the cage against Anthony Pettis on November 18, 2009, at WEC 44, but Pettis had to pull out of the bout with an undisclosed injury. McCullough instead faced WEC newcomer Karen Darabedyan. McCullough lost to Darabedyan via split decision.

With three losses in his last five fights, McCullough released by the WEC and eventually joined Tachi Palace Fights, returning to the venue where his career began, and had somewhat of a resurgence. He defeated Isaac de Jesus by first-round TKO on July 9, 2010, at Tachi Palace Fight 5. He then defeated UFC veteran Corey Hill by unanimous decision on September 9, 2010, at Tachi Palace Fight 6.

=== Bellator MMA ===
On October 14, 2010, McCullough signed with Bellator to compete in the promotion's upcoming Season Four Lightweight Tournament. He was knocked out by a counter right by Patricky "The Pitbull" Freire.

=== DREAM ===
McCullough next faced Shinya Aoki at DREAM 17. He lost the fight via submission in the first round.

== Personal life ==
McCullough was married to Kristina McCullough. The couple had their first child, a son, in March 2010 and second child, a son born in November 2014. They divorced in May, 2020. He is now engaged to FightCamp Trainer Shanie Rusth.

He is of Irish and Mexican descent.

McCullough owns MMA apparel company Razor Clothing.

== Championships and accomplishments ==
- World Extreme Cagefighting
  - WEC Lightweight Championship (one time)
    - One successful title defense
- MMA HQ
  - 2008 Fight of the Year vs. Donald Cerrone at WEC 36

== Kickboxing record ==
Kickboxing record
? wins (? KOs), ? losses, ? draws
Date	Result	Opponent	Event	Location	Method	Round	Time
2004-08-07	Loss	(United States) James Martinez	K-1 World Grand Prix 2004 in Las Vegas II	Las Vegas, Nevada, USA	TKO	1	1:53
2004-04-30	Win	(United States) John Polakowski	K-1 World Grand Prix 2004 in Las Vegas I	Las Vegas, Nevada, USA	TKO	2	2:38
1997	Win	(United States) Gary Owens	I.S.K.A Jr Welterweight State Kickboxing Championship	San Jose, California, USA	TKO	2	
1997 - 1999	Win	(United States) Eddie Wedding	U.W.M.T.A Welterweight U.S. Champion	Sequoia Conference Center, Buena Park, California USA	KO		
1997 - 1999	Win	(United States) William Syripai	U.W.M.T.A Welterweight U.S. Champion	Sequoia Conference Center, Buena Park, California USA	DEC		
1997 - 1999	Win	(United States) Mitch Milat	U.W.M.T.A Welterweight U.S. Champion	Sequoia Conference Center, Buena Park, California USA	KO		
1997 - 1999	Win	(United States) Javier Janjira	U.W.M.T.A Welterweight U.S. Champion	Whittier Hilton, Whittier California USA	KO		
1997 - 1999	Win	(United States) Phally Rin	U.W.M.T.A Welterweight U.S. Champion	Sequoia Conference Center, Buena Park, California USA	DEC		
1998	Win	(United States) Lee Hua	I.K.K.C Jr Welterweight U.S. Champion	Crystal Park Casino, California USA	DEC		
1998	Win	(United States)	I.A.M.T.F Welterweight U.S. Champion	Maywood, California USA	DEC		
1998	Win	(United States) Scott Thorson	I.K.B.A Welterweight International Kickboxing Champion	Whittier, California USA	DEC		
Legend: Win Loss Draw/no contest Notes

== Mixed martial arts record ==
Professional record breakdown
27 matches	19 wins	8 losses
By knockout	11	2
By submission	2	1
By decision	6	5

Res.	Record	Opponent	Method	Event	Date	Round	Time	Location	Notes
Loss	19–8	Shinya Aoki	Submission (neck crank)	DREAM 17	September 24, 2011	1	4:57	Saitama, Japan	
Loss	19–7	Patricky Freire	TKO (punches)	Bellator 36	March 12, 2011	3	3:11	Shreveport, Louisiana, United States	Bellator Season Four Lightweight Tournament Quarterfinal.
Win	19–6	Corey Hill	Decision (unanimous)	TPF 6: High Stakes	September 9, 2010	3	5:00	Lemoore, California, United States	
Win	18–6	Isaac DeJesus	TKO (punches)	TPF 5: Stars and Strikes	July 9, 2010	1	4:31	Lemoore, California, United States	Catchweight (160 lbs) bout.
Loss	17–6	Karen Darabedyan	Decision (split)	WEC 44	November 18, 2009	3	5:00	Las Vegas, Nevada, United States	
Win	17–5	Marcus Hicks	Decision (majority)	WEC 39	March 1, 2009	3	5:00	Corpus Christi, Texas, United States	
Loss	16–5	Donald Cerrone	Decision (unanimous)	WEC 36	November 5, 2008	3	5:00	Hollywood, Florida, United States	WEC Lightweight title eliminator. Fight of the Night.
Win	16–4	Kenneth Alexander	Decision (split)	WEC 34	June 1, 2008	3	5:00	Sacramento, California, United States	
Loss	15–4	Jamie Varner	TKO (punches)	WEC 32	February 13, 2008	3	2:54	Rio Rancho, New Mexico, United States	Lost the WEC Lightweight Championship.
Win	15–3	Richard Crunkilton	TKO (punches)	WEC 30	September 5, 2007	1	1:29	Las Vegas, Nevada, United States	Defended the WEC Lightweight Championship.
Win	14–3	Kit Cope	Submission (punches)	WEC 25	January 20, 2007	1	2:53	Las Vegas, Nevada, United States	Won the vacant WEC Lightweight Championship.
Win	13–3	Harris Sarmiento	Decision (unanimous)	WFA: King of the Streets	July 22, 2006	3	5:00	Los Angeles, California, United States	
Win	12–3	Ryan Healy	TKO (cut)	WEC 21	June 15, 2006	1	1:52	Highland, California, United States	
Win	11–3	Randy Hauer	TKO (punches)	WEC 20	May 5, 2006	1	2:36	Lemoore, California, United States	
Win	10–3	Olaf Alfonso	KO (punch)	WEC 19	March 17, 2006	2	0:12	Lemoore, California, United States	
Win	9–3	Gabe Rivas	Submission (verbal)	KOTC 63	December 2, 2005	2	3:11	San Jacinto, California, United States	
Win	8–3	Jeremy Jones	TKO (punches)	KOTC 58	August 5, 2005	1	0:45	San Jacinto, California, United States	
Win	7–3	Andrew Williams	TKO (punches)	PFC: Pit Fighting Championship	February 7, 2004	1	N/A	Upland, California, United States	
Loss	6–3	Harris Sarmiento	Decision (split)	WEC 9	January 16, 2004	3	5:00	Lemoore, California, United States	
Win	6–2	Danny Devine	TKO (leg kicks)	PFC: Put Up or Shut Up	August 23, 2003	1	N/A	Upland, California, United States	
Win	5–2	Nam Phan	Decision (unanimous)	PFC: Knucklefest	April 5, 2003	2	5:00	California, United States	
Win	4–2	Anthony Garcia	KO (punches)	PFC: Knucklefest	April 5, 2003	1	N/A	California, United States	
Win	3–2	William Sriyapai	Decision (unanimous)	PFC: Knucklefest	April 5, 2003	1	5:00	California, United States	
Loss	2–2	Josh Thomson	Decision (unanimous)	WFA 3: Level 3	November 23, 2002	3	5:00	Las Vegas, Nevada, United States	
Loss	2–1	Kenneth Alexander	Decision (unanimous)	HFP 1: Rumble on the Reservation	March 30, 2002	4	3:00	Anza, California, United States	
Win	2–0	Steve Wagner	TKO (corner stoppage)	Ultimate Pankration 1	November 11, 2001	1	3:55	Cabazon, California, United States	
Win	1–0	Jesse Heck	TKO (punches)	WEC 2	October 4, 2001	1	0:24	Lemoore, California, United States	

== See also ==
- List of Bellator MMA alumni

Vacant Title last held by Hermes Franca	WEC Lightweight Champion; January 20, 2007 - February 13, 2008	Succeeded by Jamie Varner
