= Nick Catone =

American mixed martial arts fighter

- Born: September 1, 1981 (age 45); Brick Township, New Jersey, U.S.
- Other names: The Jersey Devil
- Nationality: American
- Height: 6 ft 0 in (1.83 m)
- Weight: 185.5 lb (84.1 kg; 13.25 st)
- Division: Middleweight; Welterweight
- Reach: 72 1/2 in (184 cm)
- Fighting out of: Brick Township, New Jersey, U.S.
- Team: Nick Catone MMA Academy
- Rank: 3rd degree Black belt in Brazilian Jiu-Jitsu under Ricardo Almeida
- Wrestling: NCAA Division I Wrestler
- Years active: 2007–2015

Mixed martial arts record
- Total: 14
- Wins: 10
- By knockout: 3
- By submission: 3
- By decision: 4
- Losses: 4
- By knockout: 1
- By submission: 2
- By decision: 1

Other information
- Website: http://www.nickcatone.com
- Mixed martial arts record from Sherdog

Nicholas Catone (born September 1, 1981) is a retired American mixed martial artist. Catone competed from 2009 to 2015 in the Middleweight division of the Ultimate Fighting Championship.

== Mixed martial arts career ==
=== Wrestling ===
Catone began wrestling in middle school. Catone stayed with the sport all through his middle and high school years. While at Brick Memorial High School in Brick Township, New Jersey, Catone won numerous awards and titles in wrestling. He was a New Jersey State place winner, Three-time Division I national qualifier, 2x Division I conference champion and 100 Division I career wins. He was rewarded with a scholarship to wrestle for Rutgers University but did not like the lifestyle of a large college. After spending a year at Rutgers, Catone transferred to Rider University where he won Male Athlete of the Year in 2004. Catone graduated from Rider with a bachelor's degree in psychology.

=== Early mixed martial arts career ===
After college, Catone realized that he did not want to give up the sport of wrestling. So he found a mixed martial arts training facility in 2005 and started working very hard on his boxing and Brazilian jiu-jitsu skills to become a successful professional mixed martial artist.

=== Ultimate Fighting Championship ===
Catone's first UFC fight was scheduled to be against TUF 7 winner Amir Sadollah at UFC 91. However, due to a leg infection, Sadollah withdrew from the match. A replacement for Sadollah could not be found so the match was scrapped from the card. The match against Sadollah was rescheduled for February 7, 2009, at UFC Fight Night 17. On January 23, Sadollah was, again, forced to withdraw from the fight due, this time to a fractured clavicle.

Catone finally made his UFC debut, defeating Derek Downey via keylock in the second round at UFC Fight Night: Lauzon vs. Stephens.

Catone's second fight for the UFC, he fought Tim Credeur at UFC Fight Night 18. Catone lost for the first time in his career by submission due to a guillotine choke in the second round. The fight later went on to be shown on an episode of UFC Unleashed.

At UFC 102, Catone took his second consecutive loss against Mark Muñoz. The fight was full of intense sprawls and exciting stand up battles. Catone lost the fight by a very close split decision (28–29, 30–27 and 29–28). Despite the loss, Catone signed a new four fight deal with the promotion.

Catone was originally scheduled to face Steve Steinbeiss at UFC Fight Night 20. However, Steinbess pulled out of the fight because of an undisclosed injury and was replaced by Jesse Forbes. Catone returned to his winning ways by defeating Forbes via split decision (28–29, 29–28, 29–28).

Catone was scheduled to face John Salter on May 8, 2010, at UFC 113, but Catone was forced from the card with a back injury. He was replaced by Jason MacDonald.

After suffering two injuries, Catone was expected to drop down to the welterweight division. Instead, he was expected face Tomasz Drwal on September 15, 2010, at UFC Fight Night 22. However, Catone withdrew from the fight against Drwal due to injury.

Catone was expected to face Dan Miller on March 19, 2011, at UFC 128 in a catchweight bout of 195 lbs. However, Miller was pulled from the bout to fill in for Yoshihiro Akiyama against Nate Marquardt and was replaced by UFC newcomer Costas Philippou. He won the fight via unanimous decision.

Catone was expected to face Aaron Simpson on October 8, 2011, at UFC 136. However, Catone was forced out of the bout after tearing an Achilles tendon, and was replaced by Eric Schafer.

Catone faced Chris Camozzi on June 22, 2012, at UFC on FX 4. Catone was up the first two rounds on the scorecards until a knee by Camozzi caused a large cut on the forehead of Catone, resulting in a doctor stoppage in the third round.

Catone made his welterweight debut against TJ Waldburger on December 15, 2012, at The Ultimate Fighter: Team Carwin vs. Team Nelson Finale. He lost the fight via technical submission in the second round after he passed out in Waldburger's triangle choke.

Catone was expected to face James Head on April 27, 2013, at UFC 159. However, at the weigh ins Catone missed weight and the bout was subsequently pulled from the card the day of the show after Catone went to the hospital for dehydration.

Catone faced Tom Watson in a middleweight bout on February 1, 2014, at UFC 169. He won the fight via split decision.

Catone was expected to face Vitor Miranda on April 18, 2015, at UFC on Fox 15. However, Catone abruptly announced his retirement on March 25, citing a litany of injuries and a history of chronic back pain.

== Championships and accomplishments ==
- United States Kickboxing Association
  - USKBA Middleweight Championship (one time)

== Mixed martial arts record ==
Professional record breakdown
14 matches	10 wins	4 losses
By knockout	3	1
By submission	3	2
By decision	4	1

Res.	Record	Opponent	Method	Event	Date	Round	Time	Location	Notes
Win	10–4	Tom Watson	Decision (split)	UFC 169	February 1, 2014	3	5:00	Newark, New Jersey, United States	Middleweight bout.
Loss	9–4	TJ Waldburger	Technical Submission (triangle choke)	The Ultimate Fighter 16 Finale	December 15, 2012	2	1:04	Las Vegas, Nevada, United States	Welterweight debut.
Loss	9–3	Chris Camozzi	TKO (doctor stoppage)	UFC on FX: Maynard vs. Guida	June 22, 2012	3	1:51	Atlantic City, New Jersey, United States	
Win	9–2	Costas Philippou	Decision (unanimous)	UFC 128	March 19, 2011	3	5:00	Newark, New Jersey, United States	195 lb Catchweight bout
Win	8–2	Jesse Forbes	Decision (split)	UFC Fight Night: Maynard vs. Diaz	January 11, 2010	3	5:00	Fairfax, Virginia, United States	
Loss	7–2	Mark Muñoz	Decision (split)	UFC 102	August 29, 2009	3	5:00	Portland, Oregon, United States	
Loss	7–1	Tim Credeur	Submission (guillotine choke)	UFC Fight Night: Condit vs. Kampmann	April 1, 2009	2	3:45	Nashville, Tennessee, United States	
Win	7–0	Derek Downey	Submission (keylock)	UFC Fight Night: Lauzon vs. Stephens	February 7, 2009	2	1:15	Tampa, Florida, United States	
Win	6–0	Eric Tavares	TKO (punches)	Ring of Combat 20	June 26, 2008	1	4:25	Atlantic City, New Jersey, United States	
Win	5–0	Mitch Whitesel	TKO (punches)	Ring of Combat 19	May 9, 2008	1	2:27	Atlantic City, New Jersey, United States	Won the vacant USKBA Middleweight Championship.
Win	4–0	Ben Knight	TKO (elbows)	Ring of Combat 17	November 30, 2007	1	1:08	Atlantic City, New Jersey, United States	
Win	3–0	Dan Whalen	Submission (rear-naked choke)	Ring of Combat 16	October 26, 2007	1	0:58	Atlantic City, New Jersey, United States	
Win	2–0	John Howard	Decision (unanimous)	CFFC 5: Two Worlds, One Cage	June 26, 2007	3	5:00	Atlantic City, New Jersey, United States	
Win	1–0	Dan Karnbauer	Submission (arm-triangle choke)	Reality Fighting 15	May 19, 2007	1	1:23	Atlantic City, New Jersey, United States	

== Post-UFC career and anti-vaccine activism ==
After retiring from competition, Catone opened a gym in Ocean County, New Jersey, in 2018. Some of the athletes he is currently coaching include Lance Palmer and Timur Valiev.

He and his wife Marjorie Madison-Catone became involved in the anti-vaccination movement after his 20-month-old Nicolas died unexpectedly. A medical expert who conducted an autopsy on the body attributed the death to sudden unexplained death in childhood, a disease which has no known causes, but the parents blamed recent vaccinations for the tragedy. Catone became vocal on social media about his anti-vaccination theories and the story of his child was used in a billboard campaign by the anti-vaccination group Learn The Risk.

In 2020, during the COVID-19 pandemic, Facebook deleted Catone's account, as part of its efforts to reduce the amount of misinformation about medical topics on the network. Catone threatened to sue Facebook for an amount exceeding $5 billion for depriving him of a means to promote his business and the loss of personal pictures.

== See also ==
- List of current UFC fighters
- List of male mixed martial artists
