= Tim Credeur =

American mixed martial arts fighter

- Born: July 9, 1977 (age 49); Lafayette, Louisiana, U.S.
- Other names: Crazy Tim
- Height: 6 ft 3 in (1.91 m)
- Weight: 185 lb (84 kg; 13.2 st)
- Division: Middleweight
- Reach: 75 in (191 cm)
- Stance: Orthodox
- Fighting out of: Breaux Bridge, Louisiana, U.S.
- Team: Gladiator LA
- Rank: Black belt in Brazilian Jiu-Jitsu under Rodrigo Medeiros; Black belt in Judo
- Years active: 2001–2011

Mixed martial arts record
- Total: 16
- Wins: 12
- By knockout: 4
- By submission: 8
- Losses: 4
- By knockout: 3
- By decision: 1

Other information
- Mixed martial arts record from Sherdog

Tim Credeur (born July 9, 1977) is an American retired mixed martial artist. He was a cast member of Spike TV's The Ultimate Fighter 7 and was defeated by fellow cast member Jesse Taylor in the semi-finals. He was then brought back into the competition following the disqualification of Taylor. He fought C.B. Dollaway for a spot in the finals and lost to Dollaway via decision.

== Mixed martial arts career ==
=== The Ultimate Fighter 7 ===
Tim is a member of Louisiana's Gladiator Academy and appeared on "The Ultimate Fighter" series. Tim advanced to the semifinals with victories over Erik Charles, Matthew Riddle, and Dan Cramer (all by submission). During the show's semi-final fight between him and Jesse Taylor, Taylor won by unanimous decision after 3 rounds. However, after Taylor was removed from the finale for disciplinary reasons, Credeur fought C.B. Dollaway to determine who would match up against Amir Sadollah in the show's live finale.

Tim lost the match by unanimous decision after 3 rounds, though the match was very closely contested.

=== UFC career ===
He was scheduled to fight fellow Team Forrest member Cale Yarbrough at the TUF 7 finale. However, Tim admitted to using the prescription drug Adderall five days prior to the event; Adderall is a drug banned by the Nevada State Athletic Commission. A drug test was performed and the prescription drug was still in Tim's system. As a result, the match was cancelled.

As Tim admitted to the recent use of the drug and he did not fight, there was no disciplinary action taken against him; his bout with Yarbrough was rescheduled for the UFC's July 19 show, UFC: Silva vs. Irvin. This time the match did happen and Tim won by TKO at 1:54 of round 1. Tim took on Nate Loughran at UFC: Fight For The Troops, Tim beat Loughran, due to Loughran withdrawing at the end of round two.

His next fight would be against Nick Catone at UFC Fight Night: Condit vs. Kampmann which he won by Submission (Guillotine Choke) at 3:45 of round 2, giving him his third consecutive victory in the UFC.

Tim fought on the UFC Fight Night 19 card against former middleweight title contender Nate Quarry. Tim lost the fight by unanimous decision after winning the first round but losing the second and third. The fight was shown live and free on the main card. The fight earned Fight of the Night.

Credeur was scheduled to face Mike Massenzio at UFC Fight Night 20, but was replaced by fellow TUF castmate and UFC newcomer Gerald Harris after being forced off the card with an injury.

Credeur was scheduled to face Tom Lawlor on May 8, 2010 at UFC 113, but was forced off the card with another injury. He was replaced by Joe Doerksen. Credeur later revealed that he was forced out of the scheduled UFC 113 bout due to an abnormality found during a brain scan.

Credeur faced Ed Herman on June 4, 2011 at The Ultimate Fighter 13 Finale. He lost the fight via TKO in the first round.

Credeur was expected to face Brad Tavares on October 29, 2011 at UFC 137. However, Creduer was forced out of the bout and replaced by promotional newcomer Dustin Jacoby.

In 2013 Credeur quietly retired from fighting to focus on teaching and coaching in his MMA gym in Lafayette, Louisiana.

== Personal life ==
Credeur and his wife Mamie had their first child, a daughter, on January 4, 2011.

== Championships and accomplishments ==
- Ultimate Fighting Championship
  - UFC.com Awards
    - 2009: Ranked #9 Loss of the Year & Ranked #3 Fight of the Year vs. Nate Quarry

== Mixed martial arts record ==
Professional record breakdown
16 matches	12 wins	4 losses
By knockout	4	3
By submission	8	0
By decision	0	1

Res.	Record	Opponent	Method	Event	Date	Round	Time	Location	Notes
Loss	12–4	Ed Herman	TKO (punches)	The Ultimate Fighter 13 Finale	June 4, 2011	1	0:48	Las Vegas, Nevada, United States	
Loss	12–3	Nate Quarry	Decision (unanimous)	UFC Fight Night: Diaz vs. Guillard	September 16, 2009	3	5:00	Oklahoma City, Oklahoma, United States	Fight of the Night.
Win	12–2	Nick Catone	Submission (guillotine choke)	UFC Fight Night: Condit vs. Kampmann	April 1, 2009	2	3:45	Nashville, Tennessee, United States	
Win	11–2	Nate Loughran	TKO (injury)	UFC: Fight for the Troops	December 10, 2008	2	5:00	Fayetteville, North Carolina, United States	
Win	10–2	Cale Yarbrough	KO (punches)	UFC Fight Night: Silva vs. Irvin	July 19, 2008	1	1:54	Las Vegas, Nevada, United States	
Win	9–2	Chris Gates	Submission (armbar)	SCF: Punishment at the PMAC	October 13, 2007	1	4:47	Baton Rouge, Louisiana, United States	
Win	8–2	Brandon McDowell	Submission (triangle choke)	IXFA: Revolution Fight Night	September 1, 2007	1	1:35	Lafayette, Louisiana, United States	
Win	7–2	Josh Lawrence	Submission (armbar)	Universal Gladiator Championships 4	September 22, 2006	1	4:43	Kenner, Louisiana, United States	
Loss	6–2	Chael Sonnen	TKO (punches)	Bodog Fight: Costa Rica	August 22, 2006	1	2:18	Costa Rica	
Win	6–1	Edward Maxwell	TKO	ISCF: Rampage in the Cage 2	June 3, 2006	1	N/A	Lafayette, Louisiana, United States	
Win	5–1	Liam McCarty	Submission (armbar)	ISCF: Rampage in the Cage	March 11, 2006	1	1:03	Lafayette, Louisiana, United States	
Win	4–1	Lance Everson	Submission (armbar)	MMA: Eruption	April 30, 2004	1	3:02	Lowell, Massachusetts, United States	
Win	3–1	James Pokluda	Submission	Renegades Extreme Fighting	November 15, 2003	1	2:22	Houston, Texas, United States	
Win	2–1	Bone Sayavonga	KO	Reality Combat Fighting 17	June 1, 2002	1	0:13	Lafayette, Louisiana, United States	
Loss	1–1	Joey Villaseñor	TKO (submission to punches)	KOTC 13: Revolution	May 17, 2002	2	3:24	Reno, Nevada, United States	
Win	1–0	Kevin Denz	Submission (armbar)	Rage in the Cage 26	March 24, 2001	1	1:54	Phoenix, Arizona, United States	

=== Mixed martial arts exhibition record ===
Exhibition record breakdown		
5 matches	3 wins	2 losses
By submission	3	0
By decision	0	2

Res.	Record	Opponent	Method	Event	Date	Round	Time	Location	Notes
Loss	3–2	C. B. Dollaway	Decision (unanimous)	The Ultimate Fighter 7	June 18, 2008 (airdate)	3	5:00	Las Vegas, Nevada, United States	Semi-final replacemant bout.
Loss	3–1	Jesse Taylor	Decision (unanimous)	The Ultimate Fighter 7	June 11, 2008 (airdate)	3	5:00	Las Vegas, Nevada, United States	Semi-finals.
Win	3–0	Dan Cramer	Submission (heel hook)	The Ultimate Fighter 7	June 4, 2008 (airdate)	1	2:10	Las Vegas, Nevada, United States	Quarter-finals.
Win	2–0	Matt Riddle	Submission (armbar)	The Ultimate Fighter 7	April 23, 2008 (airdate)	2	4:04	Las Vegas, Nevada, United States	Preliminary bout.
Win	1–0	Erik Charles	Submission (armbar)	The Ultimate Fighter 7	April 9, 2008 (airdate)	1	1:01	Las Vegas, Nevada, United States	Elimination bout.
