= UFC 106 =

UFC mixed martial arts event in 2009

UFC 106: Ortiz vs. Griffin 2
- The poster for UFC 106: Ortiz vs. Griffin 2
- Promotion: Ultimate Fighting Championship
- Date: November 21, 2009
- Venue: Mandalay Bay Events Center
- City: Paradise, Nevada
- Attendance: 10,529
- Total gate: $3,003,250
- Buyrate: 375,000

Event chronology
| UFC 105: Couture vs. Vera | UFC 106: Ortiz vs. Griffin 2 | The Ultimate Fighter: Heavyweights Finale |

UFC 106: Ortiz vs. Griffin 2 was a mixed martial arts event held by the Ultimate Fighting Championship (UFC) on November 21, 2009, at the Mandalay Bay Events Center.

== Background ==
As with UFC 103 and UFC 104, a portion of the preliminary card aired live and commercial-free during an hour-long block on Spike. Tito Ortiz was originally scheduled to fight Mark Coleman; however, on October 5, 2009, the fight was cancelled as Coleman was suffering from a knee injury. UFC confirmed that Forrest Griffin would step in to face Ortiz.

On October 26, UFC Heavyweight Champion Brock Lesnar pulled out of his fight against Shane Carwin due to an illness that kept him from training. The UFC therefore had the Ortiz v. Griffin fight headline the UFC 106 card.

Previously announced match-ups of John Howard vs. Dennis Hallman and Kenny Florian vs. Clay Guida were moved to The Ultimate Fighter: Heavyweights Finale and UFC 107 respectively.

Tom Lawlor was originally scheduled to fight at UFC 106 but he was moved to UFC Fight Night: Maynard vs. Diaz.

Jon Fitch was originally set to fight Ricardo Almeida but Almeida was forced off the card with a knee injury. Fitch was moved to the UFC 107 card to fight Mike Pierce.

Dana White confirmed on November 19 that Karo Parisyan had pulled out of his fight against Dustin Hazelett for undisclosed reasons. Hazelett was paid his full purse including show and win. As a result, the fight between Paulo Thiago and Jacob Volkmann was promoted to the main card. Parisyan was also cut from the promotion following this incident.

== Results ==
Main card (PPV)
| Weight class | | | | Method | Round | Time | Notes |
|---|---|---|---|---|---|---|---|
| Light Heavyweight | Forrest Griffin | def. | Tito Ortiz | Decision (split) (28–29, 30–27, 29–28) | 3 | 5:00 |
| Welterweight | Josh Koscheck | def. | Anthony Johnson | Submission (rear-naked choke) | 2 | 4:47 |
| Welterweight | Paulo Thiago | def. | Jacob Volkmann | Decision (unanimous) (29–28, 30–27, 30–27) | 3 | 5:00 |
| Light Heavyweight | Antônio Rogério Nogueira | def. | Luiz Cané | TKO (punches) | 1 | 1:56 |
| Welterweight | Amir Sadollah | def. | Phil Baroni | Decision (unanimous) (30–27, 30–27, 29–28) | 3 | 5:00 |
Preliminary card (Spike TV)
| Welterweight | Ben Saunders | def. | Marcus Davis | KO (knees) | 1 | 3:24 |
| Middleweight | Kendall Grove | def. | Jake Rosholt | Submission (triangle choke) | 1 | 3:59 |
Preliminary card
| Welterweight | Brian Foster | def. | Brock Larson | TKO (punches) | 2 | 3:25 | (Note: Larson had 2 points deducted in round 1 for an illegal upkick & an illegal knee to a downed opponent.) |
| Lightweight | Caol Uno | vs. | Fabricio Camoes | Draw (majority) (29–27, 28–28, 28–28) | 3 | 5:00 | (Note: Camoes had 1 point deducted in round 2 for an illegal upkick.) |
| Lightweight | George Sotiropoulos | def. | Jason Dent | Submission (armbar) | 2 | 4:36 |

== Bonus awards ==
The following fighters received $70,000 bonuses.

- Fight of the Night: Josh Koscheck vs. Anthony Johnson
- Knockout of the Night: Antônio Rogério Nogueira
- Submission of the Night: Josh Koscheck

== Reported payout ==
The following is the reported payout to the fighters as reported to the Nevada State Athletic Commission. It does not include sponsor money or "locker room" bonuses often given by the UFC and also do not include the UFC's traditional "fight night" bonuses.

- Forrest Griffin: $250,000 (includes $150,000 win bonus) def. Tito Ortiz: $250,000
- Josh Koscheck: $106,000 ($53,000 win bonus) def. Anthony Johnson: $17,000
- Paulo Thiago: $16,000 ($8,000 win bonus) def. Jacob Volkmann: $6,000
- Antônio Rogério Nogueira: $100,000 ($30,000 win bonus) def. Luiz Cane: $19,000
- Amir Sadollah: $30,000 ($15,000 win bonus) def. Phil Baroni: $25,000
- Ben Saunders: $20,000 ($10,000 win bonus) def. Marcus Davis: $27,000
- Kendall Grove: $44,000 ($22,000 win bonus) def. Jake Rosholt: $15,000
- Brian Foster: $12,000 ($6,000 win bonus) def. Brock Larson: $26,000
- Caol Uno: $20,000 vs. Fabricio Camoes: $10,000 ^
- George Sotiropoulos: $20,000 ($10,000 win bonus) def. Jason Dent: $8,000

^ Both fighters earned show money; bout declared majority draw.

== See also ==
- Ultimate Fighting Championship
- List of UFC champions
- List of UFC events
- 2009 in UFC
