= Kevin Knabjian =

American mixed martial arts fighter

- Born: July 5, 1984 (age 42); Chicago, Illinois, United States
- Height: 5 ft 10 in (1.78 m)
- Weight: 170 lb (77 kg; 12 st)
- Division: Welterweight; Lightweight
- Fighting out of: Chicago, Illinois, United States
- Team: Gilbert Grappling Team Hellhouse; Midwest Training Center
- Years active: 2003–2012

Mixed martial arts record
- Total: 20
- Wins: 12
- By knockout: 6
- By submission: 6
- Losses: 7
- By knockout: 3
- By submission: 3
- By decision: 1
- Draws: 1

Other information
- University: Eastern Illinois University
- Mixed martial arts record from Sherdog

Kevin Knabjian (born July 5, 1984) is a retired American mixed martial artist of Armenian descent. A professional from 2003 until 2012, he competed for the WEC.

== Mixed martial arts career ==
Knabjian went to Eastern Illinois University, from which he graduated with a degree in Business Management. Together with fellow EIU student, Brian Ebersole, he started practicing MMA when he was in his freshman year of college. He also wrestled for EIU, a Division 1 school.

In his professional debut Knabjian fought Adam Gibson to a draw. His WEC debut ended unsuccessfully when he was knocked out by Brock Larson only 27 seconds into the fight; he went on to compete in other promotions, such as XFO, where he has drawn attention as the title fight of XFO 22, defeating Ultimate Fighter 1 fighter Josh Rafferty by TKO.

== Mixed martial arts record ==
Professional record breakdown
20 matches	12 wins	7 losses
By knockout	6	3
By submission	6	3
By decision	0	1
Draws	1	
No contests	0	

Res.	Record	Opponent	Method	Event	Date	Round	Time	Location	Notes
Loss	12–7–1	Drew Fickett	Submission (guillotine choke)	WMMA 1: Fighting for a Better World	March 31, 2012	1	3:38	El Paso, Texas, United States	Lightweight bout.
Win	12–6–1	Brandon Adamson	Submission (kimura)	XFO 42: Xtreme Fighting Organization	December 10, 2011	1	1:44	Hoffman Estates, Illinois, United States	
Win	11–6–1	John Tarrh	Submission (punches)	PCF: TWC 9: Berserk	July 16, 2011	1	0:36	Indianapolis, Indiana, United States	
Loss	10–6–1	Nick Duell	KO (head kick)	NAAFS: Caged Vengeance 9	April 16, 2011	2	1:01	Canton, Ohio, United States	
Loss	10–5–1	Brian Gassaway	Decision (unanimous)	Bellator 25	August 19, 2010	3	5:00	Chicago, Illinois, United States	
Loss	10–4–1	Jacob Volkmann	Submission (D'arce choke)	Bellator 7	May 15, 2009	2	1:42	Chicago, Illinois, United States	
Win	10–3–1	Jacob Kuester	Submission (heel hook)	Extreme Challenge 101	July 11, 2008	1	4:26	Franklin, Wisconsin, United States	
Win	9–3–1	Mario Stapel	TKO (punches)	Primetime Fighting Championships	May 30, 2008	1	2:02	Merrillville, Indiana, United States	
Win	8–3–1	Josh Rafferty	TKO (punches)	Xtreme Fighting Organization 22	February 23, 2008	1	1:58	Crystal Lake, Illinois, United States	
Win	7–3–1	Josh Lee	Submission (rear-naked choke)	AB: Lockdown	August 2, 2007	1	3:51	Chicago, Illinois, United States	
Loss	6–3–1	Brock Larson	TKO (punches)	WEC 28	June 3, 2007	1	0:27	Las Vegas, Nevada, United States	
Win	6–2–1	Jedrzej Kubski	TKO (punches)	IMMAC 2: Attack	April 21, 2007	2	1:20	Chicago, Illinois, United States	
Win	5–2–1	Grant Sarver	Submission (armbar)	CFC 1: Explosion	December 16, 2006	2	0:48	Tinley Park, Illinois, United States	
Win	4–2–1	Joe Geromiller	TKO (punches)	Courage Fighting Championships 7	November 25, 2006	3	0:55	Decatur, Illinois, United States	
Win	3–2–1	Randy Newell	Submission (armbar)	APEX: Undisputed	September 3, 2005	1	0:55	Montreal, Quebec, Canada	
Win	2–2–1	Andre Garcia	TKO	DC 2: Duneland Classic 2	August 6, 2005	1	N/A	Portage, Indiana, United States	
Loss	1–2–1	LaVerne Clark	KO (punch)	Courage Fighting Championships 1	July 24, 2004	2	0:10	Decatur, Illinois, United States	Welterweight debut.
Loss	1–1–1	Miguel Gutierrez	Submission (rear-naked choke)	Cage Fighting Championship: Ultimate Fighting Mexico	November 15, 2003	2	N/A	Monterrey, Mexico	
Win	1–0–1	Nino Marroquin	TKO (punches)	CFM: Cage Fighting Monterrey	May 23, 2003	3	N/A	Monterrey, Mexico	
Draw	0–0–1	Adam Gibson	Draw	Shooto: Midwest Fighting	May 21, 2003	2	5:00	Hammond, Indiana, United States	
