= John Salter =

American mixed martial artist (born 1985)

- Born: March 21, 1985 (age 41); Gardendale, Alabama, U.S.
- Nickname: Salty
- Height: 6 ft 1 in (1.85 m)
- Weight: 185 lb (84 kg; 13 st 3 lb)
- Division: Middleweight
- Reach: 74 in (188 cm)
- Stance: Orthodox
- Fighting out of: Wilmington, North Carolina, U.S., Nashville, Tennessee, U.S., Birmingham, Alabama, U.S.
- Team: Gym-O; Dethrone Base Camp (2012–2016); SaltyDog Jiu Jitsu (2016–2023)
- Rank: Second degree black belt in Brazilian Jiu-Jitsu under Shawn Hammonds
- Wrestling: NAIA Wrestling
- Years active: 2007–2023

Mixed martial arts record
- Total: 25
- Wins: 19
- By knockout: 7
- By submission: 10
- By decision: 2
- Losses: 6
- By knockout: 2
- By submission: 3
- By decision: 1

Other information
- University: Gardendale High School Lindenwood University
- Mixed martial arts record from Sherdog

John Salter (born March 21, 1985) is an American retired mixed martial artist, he competed in the Middleweight division of Bellator MMA. A professional competitor since 2007, he has also competed for the Ultimate Fighting Championship (UFC), Strikeforce, King of the Cage, and the Aggression Fighting Championship (AFC).

== Background ==
John Salter began training in wrestling at age 12. He attended Gardendale High School in Gardendale, Alabama, where as a wrestler he was a three-time state finalist and won the 2002 Alabama state title his junior year. He attend Lindenwood University in St. Louis, Missouri, where he won the 2007 NAIA National Wrestling Championship at 174 lbs.

Following college, Salter won various national grappling tournaments, including the 2007 NAGA Nationals (No-Gi, middleweight) Expert Division, as well as the 2007 Casca Grossa (No-Gi, 175 lb and up) Professional Division. In addition, Salter began training kickboxing and Brazilian Jiu-Jitsu.

== Mixed martial arts career ==
=== Early career ===
Salter made his amateur MMA debut in 2007 and compiled an undefeated record of 7–0. He made his professional debut in March 2009 at middleweight and has maintained a record of 19–6.

=== Ultimate Fighting Championship ===
On January 11, 2010, Salter made his UFC debut, stepping in as a last-minute replacement for Mike Massenzio against Gerald Harris at UFC Fight Night 20. Salter lost the fight due to TKO (strikes) in the third round.

Salter was scheduled to face Nick Catone on May 8, 2010, at UFC 113, but Catone was forced off the card with an injury and instead faced UFC veteran, Jason MacDonald. After 2:42 of the first round, MacDonald suffered a suspected broken ankle and Salter was declared the winner by TKO (injury).

Salter was expected to face Phil Baroni on August 28, 2010, at UFC 118, however Baroni was forced off the card with an injury. Late replacement Dan Miller defeated Salter via guillotine choke in the 2nd round.

Salter was released from the UFC with a 1–2 record.

=== Strikeforce ===
Salter was expected to make his Strikeforce debut against undefeated Yancy Medeiros at Strikeforce Challengers: Woodley vs. Saffiedine on January 7, 2011, but Medeiros was forced from the bout with an injury. As a result, Salter was pulled from the card, but later re-added, fighting Casey Huffman who he defeated via TKO due to strikes in the 1st round.

=== Armageddon ===
Salter defeated former UFC fighter Kalib Starnes in the main event of AFC 6: Conviction for Armageddon FC in Victoria, BC, Canada, on June 18. This fight was for the AFC middleweight title belt.

=== Bellator MMA ===
In his Bellator MMA debut, Salter faced Dustin Jacoby on January 16, 2015, at Bellator 132. He won the fight via submission in the second round. On June 17, 2016, John faced the former Middle Weight title holder Brandon Halsey on the main card for Bellator 156. Salter won via submission by triangle choke.

Salter faced Kendall Grove at Bellator 181 on July 14, 2017. He won the fight via technical submission in the first round.

Salter was expected to face Anatoly Tokov at Bellator 188 on November 16, 2017. However, Tokov pulled out of the bout due to an ACL injury and was replaced by Jason Radcliffe. Salter won the fight via submission in the first round.

Salter was expected to face Rafael Lovato Jr. at Bellator 198 on April 28, 2018. However, Salter was pulled by the Illinois Athletic Commission due to an eye issue on April 24 and replaced by Gerald Harris.

Salter faced Rafael Lovato Jr. on September 21, 2018, at Bellator 205. He lost the fight via a submission.

Salter stepped in to replace Melvin Manhoef against Chidi Njokuani on November 30, 2018, at Bellator 210. He won the fight via submission in the first round.

Salter faced Costello van Steenis on November 8, 2019, at Bellator 233. Salter outlasted van Steenis and won the bout unanimous decision, becoming the first time that Salter went to the judges.

Salter faced Andrew Kapel on August 21, 2020, at Bellator 244. Salter won the bout via arm-triangle choke in the third round.

Salter faced Gegard Mousasi for the Bellator Middleweight Championship on August 13, 2021, at Bellator 264. After having success with his takedowns in the first two rounds, Salter ultimately lost the bout via TKO in round three.

Salter faced Johnny Eblen on March 12, 2022, at Bellator 276. He lost the bout via unanimous decision.

Salter faced Aaron Jeffrey on March 31, 2023, at Bellator 293. He won the fight via unanimous decision and announced his retirement during the post-fight interview.

== Championships and accomplishments ==
=== Brazilian Ju-jitsu ===
- 2017 ADCC West Coast Trials Winner

=== Mixed martial arts ===
- Bellator MMA
  - Most submission wins in Bellator Middleweight division history (six)
- Aggression Fighting Championship
  - AFC Middleweight Championship (One time)

=== Grappling ===
- 2017 ADCC West Coast Trials Winner
- NAGA (North American Grappling Association) National Champion
  - Casca-Grossa Champion in professional division
- UEP Professional Middle Weight Title Holder – 2009

=== Folkstyle wrestling ===
- National Association of Intercollegiate Athletics
  - NAIA 174 lb National Champion out of Lindenwood University (2007)
  - NAIA 174 lb All-American out of Lindenwood University (2007)
- Alabama High School Athletic Association
  - AHSAA 145 lb State Champion out of Gardendale High School (2002)

== Mixed martial arts record ==
Professional record breakdown
25 matches	19 wins	6 losses
By knockout	7	2
By submission	10	3
By decision	2	1

Res.	Record	Opponent	Method	Event	Date	Round	Time	Location	Notes
Win	19–6	Aaron Jeffery	Decision (unanimous)	Bellator 293	March 31, 2023	3	5:00	Temecula, California, United States	
Loss	18–6	Johnny Eblen	Decision (unanimous)	Bellator 276	March 12, 2022	3	5:00	St. Louis, Missouri, United States	
Loss	18–5	Gegard Mousasi	TKO (punches)	Bellator 264	August 13, 2021	3	2:07	Uncasville, Connecticut, United States	For the Bellator Middleweight World Championship.
Win	18–4	Andrew Kapel	Submission (arm-triangle choke)	Bellator 244	August 21, 2020	3	3:11	Uncasville, Connecticut, United States	
Win	17–4	Costello van Steenis	Decision (unanimous)	Bellator 233	November 8, 2019	3	5:00	Thackerville, Oklahoma, United States	
Win	16–4	Chidi Njokuani	Submission (rear-naked choke)	Bellator 210	November 30, 2018	1	4:32	Thackerville, Oklahoma, United States	
Loss	15–4	Rafael Lovato Jr.	Submission (rear-naked choke)	Bellator 205	September 21, 2018	3	4:27	Boise, Idaho, United States	
Win	15–3	Jason Radcliffe	Submission (rear-naked choke)	Bellator 188	November 16, 2017	1	1:55	Tel Aviv, Israel	
Win	14–3	Kendall Grove	Technical Submission (rear-naked choke)	Bellator 181	July 14, 2017	1	4:37	Thackerville, Oklahoma, United States	
Win	13–3	Claudio Annicchiarico	TKO (punches)	Bellator 168	December 10, 2016	1	1:40	Florence, Italy	
Win	12–3	Brandon Halsey	Submission (triangle choke)	Bellator 156	June 17, 2016	1	4:03	Fresno, California, United States	
Win	11–3	Dustin Jacoby	Submission (rear-naked choke)	Bellator 132	January 16, 2015	2	3:33	Temecula, California, United States	
Win	10–3	Jaime Jara	Submission (triangle choke)	TWC 18: Halloween Havoc 3	October 25, 2013	1	2:20	Porterville, California, United States	
Win	9–3	Fred Weaver	TKO (punches)	Strikehard 23	April 27, 2013	1	2:58	Tuscaloosa, Alabama, United States	
Loss	8–3	Reggie Peña	Submission (guillotine choke)	XFC 18: Music City Mayhem	June 22, 2012	2	0:36	Nashville, Tennessee, United States	
Win	8–2	Ryan Machan	Submission (rear-naked choke)	PFC 8	December 9, 2011	1	2:47	Red Deer, Alberta, Canada	
Win	7–2	Kalib Starnes	KO (punches)	AFC 6: Conviction	June 18, 2011	2	4:13	Victoria, British Columbia, Canada	Won AFC Middleweight Championship.
Win	6–2	Casey Huffman	TKO (punches)	Strikeforce Challengers: Woodley vs. Saffiedine	January 7, 2011	1	2:59	Nashville, Tennessee, United States	
Loss	5–2	Dan Miller	Submission (guillotine choke)	UFC 118	August 28, 2010	2	1:53	Boston, Massachusetts, United States	
Win	5–1	Jason MacDonald	TKO (leg injury)	UFC 113	May 8, 2010	1	2:42	Montreal, Quebec, Canada	
Loss	4–1	Gerald Harris	TKO (punches)	UFC Fight Night: Maynard vs. Diaz	January 11, 2010	3	3:24	Fairfax, Virginia, United States	
Win	4–0	Jeremiah Riggs	TKO (punches)	CCCW: The 3rd Degree	October 17, 2009	1	4:44	Springfield, Illinois, United States	
Win	3–0	James Hammortree	Submission (arm-triangle choke)	Ultimate Event Promotions: Vendetta	July 27, 2009	3	1:58	Daphne, Alabama, United States	
Win	2–0	Roberto Traven	KO (punches)	Adrenaline MMA 3: Bragging Rights	June 11, 2009	1	2:15	Birmingham, Alabama, United States	
Win	1–0	Patrick Mandio	Submission (armbar)	KOTC: Invincible	March 27, 2009	1	4:35	Atlanta, Georgia, United States	

== See also ==
- List of male mixed martial artists
