= Phil Baroni =

American wrestler, kickboxer, & MMA fighter

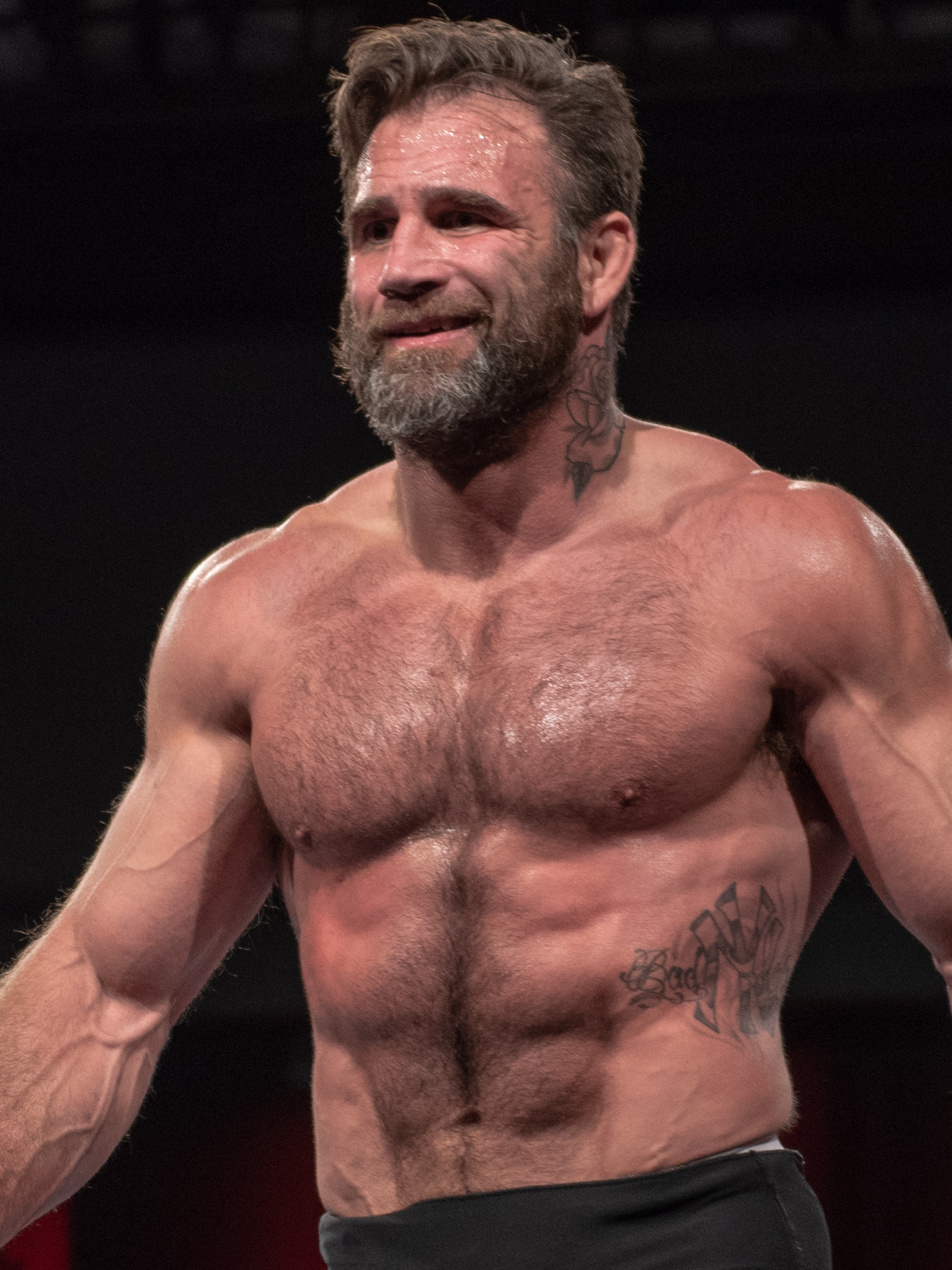
- Baroni in 2019
- Born: Philip George Baroni; April 16, 1976 (age 50); Massapequa Park, New York, U.S.
- Other names: The New York Bad Ass
- Height: 5 ft 9 in (1.75 m)
- Weight: 170 lb (77 kg; 12 st 2 lb)
- Division: Middleweight; Welterweight
- Reach: 72 in (183 cm)
- Stance: Orthodox
- Fighting out of: San Jose, California, United States
- Team: American Kickboxing Academy; Evolve MMA; Team Hammer House (formerly)
- Years active: 2000–2019

Kickboxing record
- Total: 7
- Wins: 7
- By knockout: 7

Mixed martial arts record
- Total: 35
- Wins: 16
- By knockout: 11
- By submission: 2
- By decision: 3
- Losses: 19
- By knockout: 7
- By submission: 3
- By decision: 9

Amateur boxing record
- Total: 10
- Wins: 10
- By knockout: 10

Other information
- Website: http://www.thenewyorkbadass.com
- Mixed martial arts record from Sherdog
- UFC Fighter Profile One FC Fighter Profile Last updated on: September 9, 2012

Philip George Baroni (April 16, 1976) is an American former mixed martial artist, kickboxer, boxer, and professional wrestler. Baroni competed in the UFC, PRIDE, Strikeforce, Cage Rage, DREAM, EliteXC, Bellator MMA, Titan FC, Palace Fighting Championship, King of the Cage and ONE FC.

As of January 2023, Phil Baroni is detained in Valle de Banderas, Mexico, over an alleged murder of his girlfriend.

== Background ==
Baroni was born Phillip George Baroni in Massapequa Park in Long Island, New York to American parents. His father was a prominent New York attorney and his mother was a homemaker. Phillip attended Massapequa High School where he was on the wrestling team. Baroni grew up having multiple street fights, a precursor to his career. The Baronis were next door neighbors of Jerry Seinfeld's parents. Baroni attended Nassau Community College and became a two time All-American wrestler there, placing fifth and second in the nation. However, during the later part of his senior year he was expelled. Baroni then attended Hofstra University before transferring to Central Michigan University on a scholarship, where he was a double major in biology and psychology. He was also an amateur bodybuilder from the age of 17 to 20, competing in six shows, in which he placed either first or second. He studied kickboxing under Keith Trimble, and had seven matches, winning all by knockout. He also competed in 10 amateur boxing matches, also winning all 10 by knockout.

== Mixed martial arts career ==
=== UFC ===
Baroni debuted in the UFC in only his second professional fight, at UFC 30 in Atlantic City, New Jersey. The bout was against fellow striking specialist Curtis Stout, and Baroni won by unanimous decision. Baroni was an undefeated 3-0 before getting his second fight with the UFC at UFC 34 against Matt Lindland, whom Baroni would develop a rivalry with later in their careers. Baroni lost the fight by decision, and was handed his first professional loss. However, Baroni would then quickly make a name for himself in the UFC with several impressive stoppage victories. His signature win was a decisive KO victory over former UFC Middleweight Champion Dave Menne on September 27, 2002. Baroni famously jumped on the top of the cage and proclaimed himself to be the "best eva" after the knockout of Menne.

Baroni then rematched Matt Lindland to whom he had previously lost to by judges' decision. In their rematch, Baroni suffered a second loss to Lindland by another judges' decision. He was then matched up against a teammate of Matt Lindland, future UFC Middleweight Champion Evan Tanner at UFC 45 – Revolution. Baroni dominated the beginning of the match against Tanner, but when the fight was stopped to check a cut on Tanner, Tanner regained his composure and the momentum turned, leading to the referee stopping the fight due to Baroni taking several undefended strikes on the ground. This decision was controversial as the referee Larry Landless had asked Baroni if he wanted to quit. Baroni said he believed he was asked if he wanted to continue, and said "yes". Landless stopped the bout, and was struck by a furious Baroni. Baroni was subsequently suspended for 4 months for striking the official. Upon his return Baroni got a rematch with Tanner at UFC 48 – Payback but went on to lose via decision.

Despite losing three fights in a row, the UFC matched Baroni against the relatively unknown Pete Sell. Following training with Enson Inoue, Baroni dominated early on with numerous takedowns and a dominant standup, however, Sell secured a guillotine choke and Baroni appeared to lose consciousness, but then tapped out for the first time in his career thereby ending the fight.

=== PRIDE ===
Baroni joined Hammer House soon thereafter and rebounded in Japan's PRIDE Fighting Championships promotion with several knockout victories against Ikuhisa Minowa, Ryo Chonan, and Yuki Kondo. On June 4, 2006, Baroni was summarily defeated by Ikuhisa Minowa, whom he had developed a rivalry with, via unanimous decision in the Bushido Welterweight Grand Prix 183 lb (83 kg) tournament in 2005.

On October 21, 2006 Baroni captured a victory over boxer turned mixed martial artist Yosuke Nishijima via kimura in the first round at PRIDE 32, PRIDE's first American show. In the post-fight interview Baroni humorously admitted that he did not know the name of the hold he applied and only saw it on television a couple days before the fight.

=== Feud with Frank Shamrock ===
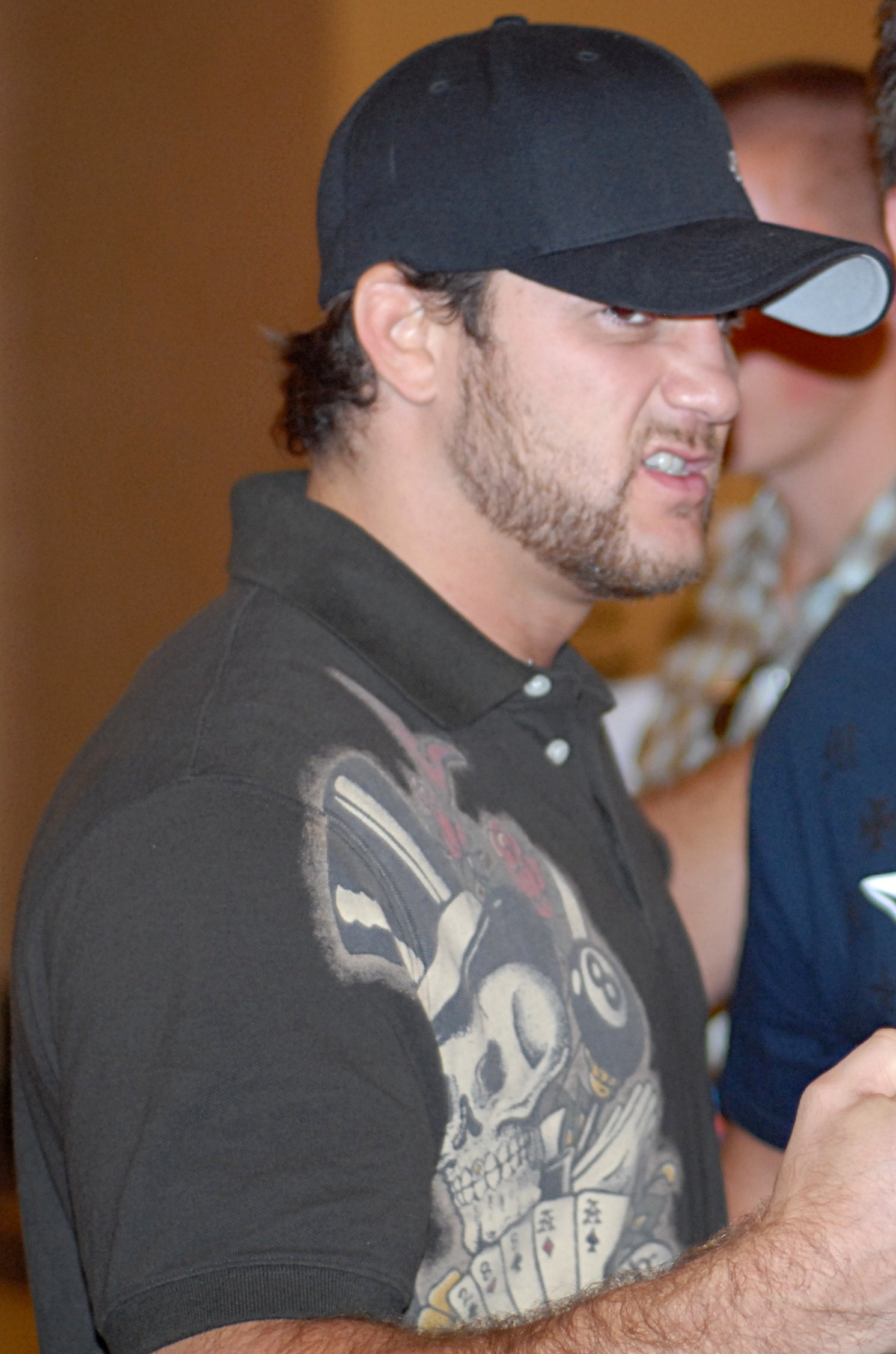
Baroni in 2007

Frank Shamrock and Baroni had engaged in a war of words following Shamrock's fight with Renzo Gracie. The two faced off at Strikeforce Shamrock vs. Baroni, a co-promotion between EliteXC and Strikeforce on June 22, 2007 on Pay-Per-View. Shamrock defeated Baroni, knocking him down with punches in the first round and finishing him off with a rear naked choke in the second round. It was ruled a technical submission victory for Shamrock as Baroni was choked unconscious before he could tap. Baroni stated many times that he was not going to tap anyway.

=== Steroid use ===
Following the Shamrock fight, the California State Athletic Commission announced that Baroni tested positive for two types of anabolic steroids, boldenone and stanozolol. Baroni appealed the $2500 fine and faced a one-year suspension. Ultimately, the fine was upheld although the suspension was reduced to six months.

Baroni had asked that the remaining urine from the test conducted by Quest be sent to the Carlson Company, a laboratory located in Colorado Springs, Colorado. While it did not appear among the 40 facilities recommended by the CSAC, Carlson appealed to the fighter as a rare lab that tested for both DNA and steroids.

There was not enough of a sample for the lab to determine the identity of its owner, though Carlson apparently had enough to determine the sample they received from Quest did not contain boldenone or stanozolol.

=== ICON Sport ===
Baroni faced Hawaii's Kala Hose on March 15, 2008 for the vacant ICON Sport Middleweight title. Former champion Robbie Lawler was stripped of the title due to his inability to defend it on numerous occasions. While Baroni came out strong during the first round of the fight, his stamina began to fade and Hose started to dominate the fight. Hose ultimately defeated Baroni by TKO early in the fifth round to become the new ICON Sport Middleweight Champion.

=== EliteXC ===
Baroni fought Joey Villasenor in the first ever live network television broadcast of MMA on CBS. In the beginning of the fight Baroni caught Villasenor's high kick which brought him down to the mat, where Baroni threw punches from guard. Baroni then let Villasenor stand up, Baroni then got struck a few times and was put into a guillotine choke. Villasenor then let go of the choke and started delivering unanswered punches that dazed Baroni, prompting the referee to stop the fight at the 1:11 mark of the opening round. This was Baroni's second consecutive TKO loss.

=== Cage Rage ===
Baroni made his Cage Rage and Welterweight debut at Cage Rage 27 on July 12, 2008, against British fighter Scott Jansen. He began the fight with a takedown, and came close to finishing the fight with an armbar with which he appeared to hyper-extend Jansen's arm. Following a standup call from the referee, the two fighters exchanged blows, Baroni throwing a right to the body, followed by a right-handed punch which to Jansen's chin. Jansen dropped, his head bouncing off the floor.

Baroni went to check on Jansen and was attacked by Jansen's brother who had made his way into the cage with the cornermen.

=== Strikeforce ===
In his second appearance in the promotion, he lost to Joe Riggs at Strikeforce: Lawler vs. Shields on June 6, 2009 in St. Louis, Missouri at Scottrade Center.

=== Return to UFC ===
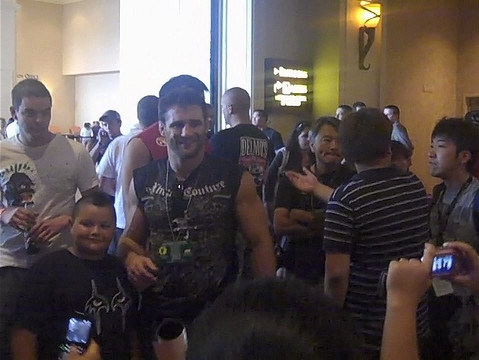
At the UFC 100 Fan Expo event in Las Vegas, July 2009

In late 2009 Baroni returned to once again fight in the UFC. He signed a multi-fight deal and his return fight was at UFC 106 on November 21, 2009 against TUF 7 winner Amir Sadollah. Sadollah defeated Baroni by unanimous decision.

After a decision loss to Sadollah, Phil Baroni spent 2 months in Phuket, Thailand learning Muay Thai at Tiger Muay Thai (TMT) with legendary coach Kru Yod. He practiced kicks, knees and elbows to improve his striking game. The TMT crew posted videos of Baroni's workouts, showing how the training sessions improved Baroni's stand up technique, and how his work with nutritionists and strength and conditioning coaches had brought Baroni back into good shape in two months.

Baroni stated his intention to return to the Middleweight division.

Baroni was scheduled to face John Salter on August 28, 2010 at UFC 118, however he was forced off the card with an injury.

Baroni next fought TUF 11 alumnus Brad Tavares at UFC 125. After dropping Tavares with a left hook early, Baroni was caught with a high kick in the later part of the round with Tavares eventually securing the TKO victory. At the post-fight interview with Ariel Helwani, Baroni said that he was expecting to be cut from UFC, but would not quit. Baroni was then subsequently released.

He left the UFC with a record of 3 wins and 7 losses.

=== Post UFC ===
After his UFC release, less than two weeks later, Baroni signed a new multi-fight contract with Titan Fighting Championships. He fought at Titan Fighting Championships 17 against Nick Nolte. He won the fight via unanimous decision.

Baroni returned from shoulder surgery against local favorite Chris Holland on June 2, 2012 at Ring of Fire 43: Bad Blood. Baroni dominated Holland in the first round, taking Holland down multiple times and landing heavy punches that opened a gash above Holland's left eyebrow. Baroni was visibly tired heading into the second round and was rocked by multiple hooks from Holland, Baroni ended up losing via TKO due to punches in the second round.

=== ONE Fighting Championship ===
On July 18 it was announced that Baroni would be facing Yoshiyuki Yoshida at ONE Fighting Championship: Champion vs. Champion at the Singapore Indoor Stadium on September 3. Baroni lost the fight via unanimous decision. After the fight Baroni had surgery on a shoulder injury which had affected him since college.

Baroni was scheduled to face Roger Huerta at ONE FC: Destiny of Warriors on June 23 but he was pulled from the fight after his TKO loss to Chris Holland on June 2.

On August 31, 2012 Baroni faced Rodrigo Ribeiro at ONE FC: Pride of a Nation. Baroni stunned Ribeiro with the first punch he threw, Baroni chased a wobbly Ribeiro landing heavy punches as the Brazilian retreated; Baroni then knocked Ribeiro down with a punch combination and finished the fight due to soccer kicks and punches just sixty seconds into round one. Baroni became the first man to ever knock out Ribeiro, the 60-second victory marks Baroni's first knockout win in over four years.

Baroni represented ONE FC in a fighter-sharing program at Dream 18 on December 31, 2012 against Hayato Sakurai. He lost the fight via unanimous decision.

Baroni next appeared on the ONE FC 9: Rise to Power card against Nobutatsu Suzuki. He lost the fight by knockout.

=== Bellator MMA ===
It was announced on March 13, 2014 that Baroni had signed a deal with Bellator MMA, and was expected to make his debut against Jesus Martinez on May 2, 2014. However, Baroni was forced out of the bout due to injury and was replaced by Ryan Contaldi.

Baroni faced Karo Parisyan in his debut fight at Bellator 122 on July 25, 2014. He lost the fight via TKO in the first round.

Baroni was cut from the promotion after defending the rapist and kidnapper War Machine, trying to justify domestic violence. War Machine was a close friend and training partner of Baroni. War Machine was also a steroid user.

=== MMA commentating ===
Since April 2009, Baroni has occasionally worked as an MMA commentator for the MMA Big Show fight organization, Tachi Palace Fights, and India's Super Fight League.

== Professional wrestling ==
In 2014, Baroni began training to become a professional wrestler at D'Lo Brown Pro Wrestling Academy.

On March 18, 2016 Baroni was announced to wrestle at Pro Wrestling Syndicate Super Card 2016 against former ECW superstar New Jack on June 11 at Starland Ballroom in Sayreville, New Jersey.

On April 4, 2019 Baroni took part in the second annual GCW Bloodsport professional wrestling event. He faced off and defeated Dominic Garrini, however his victory was later overturned to a loss by disqualification after he attacked the referee.

== Bare knuckle boxing ==
=== World Bare Knuckle Fighting Federation ===
In the fall of 2018, Baroni returned to bare knuckle boxing. He faced Chris Leben at the World Bare Knuckle Fighting Federation debut card on November 9, 2018. He lost the fight via TKO in the first round.

=== Bare Knuckle Fighting Championship ===
Baroni was next expected to face fellow UFC veteran Thiago Alves at BKFC 12 on September 19, 2020. However, Baroni was removed from the card due to the organization not being able to reach him, and was replaced by Julian Lane.

== Film career ==
Baroni appeared in several independent films, credited as "Man in Club" and "Weightlifter 2." He was credited in 2018 as มนุษย์ยิม in a Thai film.

== Murder arrest ==
Baroni was arrested in Mexico for allegedly murdering his girlfriend in early January 2023. His girlfriend was pronounced dead after being found beaten, bruised, and bloody on a bed following an argument in which Baroni threw her inside a shower with force.

== Personal life ==
Baroni was formerly represented by sports agent Ken Pavia, but after his move to American Kickboxing Academy, Baroni was managed by Bob Cook and DeWayne Zinkin of Zinkin Entertainment and Sports Management. Baroni is now managed by pro MMA fighter and professional wrestler Matt "The Granimal" Granahan's the American Combat Association since his move to professional wrestling along with other UFC stars turned pro wrestlers, such as Kamal Shalorus and UFC Hall of Famers Stephan Bonnar and Dan Severn. Before becoming a professional fighter, Baroni worked various jobs including construction, delivering pizzas, bouncing, and as a car salesman.

== Career accomplishments ==
=== Mixed martial arts ===
- Ultimate Fighting Championship
  - UFC Encyclopedia Awards
    - Fight of the Night (Four times) vs. Matt Lindland (x2) and Evan Tanner (x2)
    - Knockout of the Night (One time) vs. Dave Menne

== Mixed martial arts record ==
Professional record breakdown
35 matches	16 wins	19 losses
By knockout	11	7
By submission	2	3
By decision	3	9

Res.	Record	Opponent	Method	Event	Date	Round	Time	Location	Notes
Loss	16–19	Sai Wang	Submission (rear-naked choke)	Rebel FC 9	September 7, 2019	1	4:10	Shanghai, China	For the Rebel FC Middleweight Championship.
Win	16–18	Matt Lagler	TKO (punches)	KOTC: Under Siege	May 4, 2018	1	0:24	Alpine, California, United States	Middleweight bout.
Loss	15–18	Karo Parisyan	TKO (punches)	Bellator 122	July 25, 2014	1	2:06	Temecula, California, United States	
Loss	15–17	Nobutatsu Suzuki	TKO (punches)	ONE FC: Rise to Power	May 31, 2013	1	4:17	Pasay, Philippines	
Loss	15–16	Hayato Sakurai	Decision (unanimous)	DREAM 18	December 31, 2012	3	5:00	Tokyo, Japan	
Win	15–15	Rodrigo Ribeiro	TKO (soccer kicks and punches)	ONE FC: Pride of a Nation	August 31, 2012	1	1:00	Manila, Philippines	
Loss	14–15	Chris Holland	TKO (punches)	Ring of Fire 43: Bad Blood	June 2, 2012	2	2:50	Denver, Colorado, United States	
Loss	14–14	Yoshiyuki Yoshida	Decision (unanimous)	ONE FC 1: Champion vs. Champion	September 3, 2011	3	5:00	Kallang, Singapore	
Win	14–13	Nick Nolte	Decision (unanimous)	Titan Fighting Championships 17	March 25, 2011	3	5:00	Kansas City, Kansas, United States	Middleweight bout.
Loss	13–13	Brad Tavares	KO (knees and punches)	UFC 125	January 1, 2011	1	4:20	Las Vegas, Nevada, United States	Middleweight bout.
Loss	13–12	Amir Sadollah	Decision (unanimous)	UFC 106	November 21, 2009	3	5:00	Las Vegas, Nevada, United States	
Loss	13–11	Joe Riggs	Decision (unanimous)	Strikeforce: Lawler vs. Shields	June 6, 2009	3	5:00	St. Louis, Missouri, United States	
Win	13–10	Olaf Alfonso	Decision (unanimous)	PFC 10: Explosive	September 27, 2008	3	5:00	Lemoore, California, United States	
Win	12–10	Ron Verdadero	TKO (punches)	ICON Sport: Hard Times	August 2, 2008	1	0:51	Honolulu, Hawaii, United States	Catchweight (175 lbs) bout.
Win	11–10	Scott Jansen	KO (punch)	Cage Rage 27	July 12, 2008	1	3:20	London, England	Welterweight debut.
Loss	10–10	Joey Villaseñor	TKO (punches)	EliteXC: Primetime	May 31, 2008	1	1:11	Newark, New Jersey, United States	Middleweight bout.
Loss	10–9	Kala Hose	TKO (punches)	ICON Sport: Baroni vs. Hose	March 15, 2008	5	1:45	Honolulu, Hawaii, United States	For the ICON Sport Middleweight Championship.
Loss	10–8	Frank Shamrock	Technical Submission (rear-naked choke)	Strikeforce Shamrock vs. Baroni	June 22, 2007	2	4:00	San Jose, California, United States	For the inaugural Strikeforce Middleweight Championship.
Win	10–7	Yosuke Nishijima	Technical Submission (kimura)	PRIDE 32 The Real Deal	October 21, 2006	1	3:20	Las Vegas, Nevada, United States	Catchweight (195 lbs) bout.
Loss	9–7	Kazuo Misaki	Decision (unanimous)	PRIDE Bushido 11	June 4, 2006	2	5:00	Saitama, Japan	
Win	9–6	Yuki Kondo	KO (punch)	PRIDE Bushido 10	April 2, 2006	1	0:25	Tokyo, Japan	
Loss	8–6	Ikuhisa Minowa	Decision (unanimous)	PRIDE Bushido 9	September 25, 2005	2	5:00	Tokyo, Japan	
Win	8–5	Ryo Chonan	KO (punch)	PRIDE Bushido 8	July 17, 2005	1	1:40	Nagoya, Japan	
Win	7–5	Ikuhisa Minowa	TKO (stomps)	PRIDE Bushido 7	May 22, 2005	2	2:04	Tokyo, Japan	
Win	6–5	Chris Cruit	Submission (armbar)	Extreme Fighting Challenge 11	March 5, 2005	2	N/A	Columbus, Ohio, United States	
Loss	5–5	Pete Sell	Submission (guillotine choke)	UFC 51	February 5, 2005	3	4:19	Las Vegas, Nevada, United States	
Loss	5–4	Evan Tanner	Decision (unanimous)	UFC 48	June 19, 2004	3	5:00	Las Vegas, Nevada, United States	
Loss	5–3	Evan Tanner	TKO (punches)	UFC 45	November 21, 2003	1	4:42	Uncasville, Connecticut, United States	
Loss	5–2	Matt Lindland	Decision (unanimous)	UFC 41	February 28, 2003	3	5:00	Atlantic City, New Jersey, United States	
Win	5–1	Dave Menne	KO (punches)	UFC 39	September 27, 2002	1	0:18	Uncasville, Connecticut, United States	
Win	4–1	Amar Suloev	TKO (punches)	UFC 37	May 10, 2002	1	2:55	Bossier City, Louisiana, United States	
Loss	3–1	Matt Lindland	Decision (majority)	UFC 34	November 2, 2001	3	5:00	Las Vegas, Nevada, United States	
Win	3–0	Robert Sarkozi	TKO (punches)	WMMAA 1: MegaFights	August 10, 2001	1	1:05	Atlantic City, New Jersey, United States	
Win	2–0	Curtis Stout	Decision (unanimous)	UFC 30	February 23, 2001	2	5:00	Atlantic City, New Jersey, United States	Middleweight (199 lbs) bout.
Win	1–0	John Hayes	TKO (punches)	Vengeance at the Vanderbilt 9	August 5, 2000	1	0:35	Plainview, New York, United States	

== Bareknuckle boxing record ==
Professional record breakdown
1 match	0 wins	1 loss
By knockout	0	1

Res.	Record	Opponent	Method	Event	Date	Round	Time	Location	Notes
Loss	0–1	Chris Leben	TKO (punch)	World Bare Knuckle Fighting Federation	November 9, 2018	1	1:19	Casper, Wyoming, United States	
