= WEC 28 =

World Extreme Cagefighting mixed martial arts event in 2007

WEC 28: Faber vs. Farrar
- The poster for WEC 28: Faber vs. Farrar
- Promotion: World Extreme Cagefighting
- Date: June 3, 2007
- Venue: Hard Rock Hotel and Casino
- City: Las Vegas, Nevada

Event chronology
WEC 27: Marshall vs. McElfresh	WEC 28: Faber vs. Farrar	WEC 29: Condit vs. Larson

WEC 28: Faber vs. Farrar was the fourth mixed martial arts event held by the World Extreme Cagefighting under Zuffa management. The event was held on June 3, 2007. WEC 28 was the first WEC to be aired live on the Versus Network. The main event was a Featherweight title defense by WEC Featherweight champion, Urijah Faber.

== Results ==
Main card
Weight class				Method	Round	Time	Notes
Featherweight	Urijah Faber (c)	def	Chance Farrar	Submission (rear naked choke)	1	3:19	(Note: For the WEC Featherweight Championship.)
Featherweight	Rani Yahya	def	Mark Hominick	Submission (rear naked choke)	1	1:19
Lightweight	Alex Karalexis	def	Josh Smith	Decision (majority) (28–28, 29–27, 29–27)	3	5:00
Light Heavyweight	Brian Stann	def	Craig Zellner	TKO (punches)	1	4:57
Preliminary card
Welterweight	Brock Larson	def	Kevin Knabjian	TKO (punches)	1	0:27	(Note: Although preliminary, this bout aired on the live broadcast.)
Welterweight	John Alessio	def	Alex Serdyukov	Submission (guillotine choke)	1	1:17	(Note: Although preliminary, this bout aired on the live broadcast.)
Featherweight	Cub Swanson	def	Micah Miller	Decision (unanimous) (30–27, 30–27, 30–27)	3	5:00
Bantamweight	Brian Bowles	def	Charlie Valencia	Submission (rear naked choke)	2	2:50
Featherweight	Jeff Bedard	def	Mike French	Decision (unanimous) (30–27, 30–27, 30–27)	3	5:00

== Reported payouts ==
The following is the reported payout to the fighters as reported to the Nevada State Athletic Commission. It does not include sponsor money or "locker room" bonuses often given by the WEC.

- Urijah Faber: $20,000 ($10,000 win bonus) def. Chance Farrar:$4,000
- Rani Yahya: $10,000 ($5,000 win bonus) def. Mark Hominick: $6,000
- Alex Karalexis: $10,000 ($5,000 win bonus) def. John Smith: $1,000
- Brian Stann: $8,000 ($4,000 win bonus) def. Craig Zellner: $2,000
- Brock Larson: $16,000 ($8,000 win bonus) def. Kevin Knabjian: $2,000
- John Alessio: $18,000 ($9,000 win bonus) def. Alex Serdyukov: $6,000
- Cub Swanson: $8,000 ($4,000 win bonus) def. Micah Miller $4,000
- Brian Bowles: $4,000 ($2,000 win bonus) def. Charlie Valencia $6,000
- Jeff Bedard: $6,000 ($3,000 win bonus) def. Mike French: $3,000

== See also ==
- World Extreme Cagefighting
- List of WEC champions
- List of WEC events
- 2007 in WEC
