= Gerald Harris =

American mixed martial arts fighter

- Born: November 19, 1979 (age 46); Tulsa, Oklahoma, United States
- Other names: Hurricane, Slam King
- Height: 5 ft 11 in (1.80 m)
- Weight: 170 lb (77 kg; 12 st)
- Division: Welterweight; Middleweight
- Fighting out of: Tulsa, Oklahoma
- Years active: 2006–2019

Mixed martial arts record
- Total: 35
- Wins: 26
- By knockout: 15
- By submission: 2
- By decision: 9
- Losses: 8
- By knockout: 1
- By submission: 2
- By decision: 5
- Draws: 1

Other information
- Mixed martial arts record from Sherdog

Gerald Harris (born November 19, 1979) is an American retired mixed martial artist who most recently fought in Bellator. He was a cast member of Spike TV's The Ultimate Fighter 7 and has also competed in World Series of Fighting, the UFC, DREAM, the Portland Wolfpack in the IFL, Shark Fights, Tachi Palace Fights, and Legacy Fighting Championship.

== Early life ==
Gerald Harris attended East Central High School in Tulsa, Oklahoma, then wrestled in college for Cleveland State University where he owns the all-time record for wins on the wrestling team. Also while attending CSU, Harris was a member of the Alpha Phi Alpha fraternity.

== Mixed martial arts ==
Harris stumbled into mixed martial arts by accident after a friend convinced him to do it for fun and with Harris needing money, he agreed. He took an exhibition fight for $200, with the money he bought a "ragged Mustang to get around town." He beat his opponent so badly that he was invited to join the tournament and thus his professional fighting career began in August 2006. Harris won his first five matches before losing a controversial split decision to Fabio Leopoldo in his IFL debut.

After being on The Ultimate Fighter, Gerald went to train with Rampage Jackson for five weeks in Liverpool, England, and was very close to signing with Bellator Fighting Championships and taking part in their first season middleweight tournament.

When Gerald fell into financial problems, he was forced to move with his mother to Arizona, resulting in Gerald asking to be cut from his fight team, Team Quest. In Arizona he began training with C.B. Dollaway, Jamie Varner and Ryan Bader at Arizona Combat Sports. He left the team not long after starting and moved to Denver, Colorado, to train with Trevor Wittman at the Grudge Training Center.

=== The Ultimate Fighter ===
Harris was on the Spike TV reality show The Ultimate Fighter as a member of Team Rampage. He got on the show by defeating Mike Madallo but lost by knockout in the second round to Amir Sadollah, who was the eventual winner of that season.

=== Ultimate Fighting Championship ===
Harris was signed to the UFC after calling into MMA Junkie Radio with the special guest being President of the UFC, Dana White. Harris called the show, changing his voice, and began praising himself in the third person. Finally, Harris came out and identified himself, then he informed White of his desire to fight for the promotion and told him of his current winning streak. White congratulated Harris and told him to call the office for a talk, the talk entailed getting Harris signed to a four-fight deal with the UFC.

He was set to make his debut for the UFC against Mike Massenzio on January 11, 2010, at UFC Fight Night 20, replacing an injured Tim Credeur. Instead he fought John Salter, who stepped in for the injured Massenzio. He would later go on to defeat Salter by TKO in the third round and win Knockout of the Night.

In his second appearance in the UFC, he fought on the UFC Fight Night 21 card against recent signing Mario Miranda. The fight took place March 31, 2010, in Charlotte, North Carolina. Harris won the fight by TKO due to punches in the first round.

Harris next faced Renzo Gracie BJJ black belt, David Branch, on the under card of UFC 116. Harris won via knockout after a brutal slam at 3:25 of the third round. The knockout was awarded "Knockout of the Night," giving Harris his second post fight bonus and an extra $75,000 to his pay. The knockout was also shown on numerous sport's highlight shows, including ESPN's Sportscenter.

Harris was expected to face Alessio Sakara on August 28, 2010, at UFC 118, replacing an injured Jorge Rivera. However, Sakara was also forced off the card with an injury and replaced by Joe Vedepo. Then on August 18, it was announced that the Harris/Vedepo bout had been scrapped from the card. Harris was brought in as an alternative for the week of the event, and was given a fight purse for dieting, training and flying out to Boston.

Once again, Harris faced a UFC newcomer in Maiquel Falcão on November 20, 2010, at UFC 123 Harris lost the fight via unanimous decision and in a surprising move to many observers, was subsequently released by the promotion despite having won all 3 of his fights in it.

=== Post UFC ===
Following his release, Harris fought James Head on February 11, 2011, for Oklahoma's Xtreme Fight Night MMA. The fight was back and forth throughout the three rounds. Harris lost the fight via decision.

Harris then fought at Tachi Palace Fights 9 against journeyman Anthony Ruiz. He went on to win that fight via unanimous decision, and ended up breaking his hand in the process.

=== DREAM/ Legacy FC ===
On July 25, 2011, Harris announced on his personal Twitter that he had signed a multi-fight deal with Japanese promotion, DREAM. In his debut, Harris faced fellow UFC veteran Kazuhiro Nakamura at Dream 17. He won the fight via split decision.

Harris fought Eric Davila on Feb. 24, 2012 in the main event of Legacy Fighting Championship 10. He won the fight via unanimous decision.

Harris fought Mike Bronzoulis in his welterweight debut on May 11, 2012, at Legacy Fighting Championship 11. He defeated Bronzoulis by split decision.

=== World Series of Fighting ===
Harris signed with World Series of Fighting in late 2012 and made his promotional debut at WSOF 1 on November 3, 2012, against Josh Burkman. Harris lost the fight via unanimous decision.

In his second fight with the promotion, Harris fought Jorge Santiago at WSOF 4. The bout had a confusing first round where Harris slammed Santiago and believed he had tapped. However, the referee was stopping the action to deduct a point from Santiago for blatantly grabbing the cage during Harris' slam. Despite the confusion, Harris went on to win the fight via unanimous decision.

Harris announced his retirement from MMA on April 22, 2014.

=== MMA return ===
After two-and-a-half years away from the sport, Harris returned to active competition in December 2016. He faced Aaron Cobb at Legacy Fighting Championship 63 on December 2, 2016. What was originally scheduled to be a welterweight bout turned into a heavyweight bout after Cobb missed weight by showing up more than 50 pounds above the welterweight limit. Harris won the fight via knockout due to a slam in the first minute of the first round.

On October 21, 2017, Harris stepped into the cage against Matt McKeon at Xtreme Fight Night at Tulsa Oklahoma. He went into retirement with a win via a violent slam.

=== Bellator MMA ===
Harris stepped in as a last-minute replaced for John Salter against Rafael Lovato Jr. at Bellator 198 on April 28, 2018. Due to the lateness of the booking, the bout was contested at a catchweight of 188 pounds. Harris lost the bout via submission in the first round. Soon after the Lovato fight, Harris signed a multi-fight deal with Bellator.

In his second fight for the promotion, Harris faced Yaroslav Amosov at Bellator 202 on July 13, 2018, losing via unanimous decision.

Harris faced Anatoly Tokov at Bellator 218 on March 22, 2019. Harris managed to drop Tokov during the fight, but Tokov recovered and eventually submitted Harris via ten-finger guillotine choke. Following the loss, Harris announced that the fight was the last fight of his contract, and retired for the second time in his career.

Despite retiring earlier in 2019, Harris returned to the competition again with hopes to jumpstart his career and faced Seth Baczynski at C3 Fights 48 on November 23, 2019. He won the fight via unanimous decision and once again declared his retirement from the sport.

== Personal life ==
Gerald's brother Corey was killed in March 2009. A teenage driver making a quick left turn had collided with his motorcycle, killing him instantly. Despite this Gerald fought seven days later and dedicated his victory to his brother.

Harris is married to his wife Nicci and they have a blended family of eight children. Previously in an interview, Harris revealed that his biological children were taken away from him the weekend he fought Josh Burkman in 2012 during his divorce which was eventually overturned and he regained custody. In that same interview he said that he actually didn't retire from the sport in 2013, but was forced on a hiatus due to the ongoing divorce and custody issues

== Championships and achievements ==
=== Collegiate wrestling ===
- Cleveland State University
  - Class of 2013 Athletic Hall of Fame (Wrestling)

=== Mixed martial arts ===
- Freestyle Cage Fighting
  - FCF Middleweight Championship (Two times)
- Titan Fighting Championship
  - TFC Middleweight Championship (One time)
- Xtreme Fight Night
  - Welterweight Championship
- Shark Fights
  - Shark Fights Middleweight Championship (One time, current)
- Ultimate Fighting Championship
  - Knockout of the Night (Two times) vs. John Salter, David Branch
  - UFC.com Awards
    - 2010: Half-Year Awards: Best Newcomer of the 1HY, Ranked #6 Knockout of the Year vs. David Branch
- USA Today
  - 2010 Knockout of the Year vs. David Branch on July 3

== Mixed martial arts record ==
Professional record breakdown
35 matches	26 wins	8 losses
By knockout	15	1
By submission	2	2
By decision	9	5
Draws	1	

Res.	Record	Opponent	Method	Event	Date	Round	Time	Location	Notes
Win	26–8–1	Seth Baczynski	Decision (unanimous)	C3 Fights 48	November 23, 2019	3	5:00	Newkirk, Oklahoma, United States	
Loss	25–8–1	Anatoly Tokov	Submission (guillotine choke)	Bellator 218	March 22, 2019	2	0:37	Thackerville, Oklahoma, United States	
Draw	25–7–1	Hracho Darpinyan	Draw (majority)	Bellator 210	November 30, 2018	3	5:00	Thackerville, Oklahoma, United States	Return to Middleweight.
Loss	25–7	Yaroslav Amosov	Decision (unanimous)	Bellator 202	July 13, 2018	3	5:00	Thackerville, Oklahoma, United States	
Loss	25–6	Rafael Lovato Jr.	Submission (armbar)	Bellator 198	April 28, 2018	1	1:11	Rosemont, Illinois, United States	Catchweight (188 lb) bout.
Win	25–5	Matt McKeon	KO (slam)	Xtreme Fight Night 344	October 21, 2017	4	2:22	Tulsa, Oklahoma, United States	Won the XFN Welterweight Championship.
Win	24–5	Brian Green	Decision (unanimous)	Xtreme Fight Night 343	August 25, 2017	3	5:00	Tulsa, Oklahoma, United States	Middleweight bout.
Win	23–5	Aaron Cobb	KO (slam)	Legacy Fighting Championship 63	December 2, 2016	1	0:43	Tulsa, Oklahoma, United States	Catchweight (225 lb) bout.
Win	22–5	Jorge Santiago	Decision (unanimous)	WSOF 4	August 10, 2013	3	5:00	Ontario, California, United States	
Loss	21–5	Josh Burkman	Decision (unanimous)	WSOF 1	November 3, 2012	3	5:00	Las Vegas, Nevada, United States	
Win	21–4	Mike Bronzoulis	Decision (split)	Legacy Fighting Championship 11	May 11, 2012	3	5:00	Houston, Texas, United States	Welterweight debut.
Win	20–4	Eric Davila	Decision (unanimous)	Legacy Fighting Championship 10	February 24, 2012	3	5:00	Houston, Texas, United States	
Win	19–4	Kazuhiro Nakamura	Decision (split)	Dream 17	September 24, 2011	3	5:00	Saitama, Japan	
Win	18–4	Anthony Ruiz	Decision (unanimous)	Tachi Palace Fights 9	May 5, 2011	3	5:00	Lemoore, California, United States	
Loss	17–4	James Head	Decision (unanimous)	Xtreme Fight Night 2: Harris vs. Head	February 25, 2011	3	5:00	Tulsa, Oklahoma, United States	
Loss	17–3	Maiquel Falcão	Decision (unanimous)	UFC 123	November 20, 2010	3	5:00	Auburn Hills, Michigan, United States	
Win	17–2	David Branch	KO (slam)	UFC 116	July 3, 2010	3	2:35	Las Vegas, Nevada, United States	Knockout of the Night.
Win	16–2	Mario Miranda	TKO (punches)	UFC Fight Night: Florian vs. Gomi	March 31, 2010	1	4:49	Charlotte, North Carolina, United States	
Win	15–2	John Salter	TKO (punches)	UFC Fight Night: Maynard vs. Diaz	January 11, 2010	3	3:24	Fairfax, Virginia, United States	Knockout of the Night.
Win	14–2	Nissen Osterneck	KO (punch)	Shark Fights 6: Stars & Stripes	September 12, 2009	1	0:46	Amarillo, Texas, United States	Won the Shark Fights Middleweight Championship.
Win	13–2	David Knight	KO (punches)	Slammin Jammin Weekend 2	March 28, 2009	1	1:38	Red Rock, Oklahoma, United States	
Win	12–2	Travis Doerge	Submission (guillotine choke)	C3 Fights: Knockout Rockout Weekend	January 30, 2009	1	2:32	Clinton, Oklahoma, United States	
Win	11–2	Jay Ford	TKO (submission to punches)	Freestyle Cage Fighting 25	November 15, 2008	1	3:43	Tulsa, Oklahoma, United States	
Win	10–2	Mitch Whitesel	Decision (unanimous)	C3 Fights: Showdown 2	August 16, 2008	3	5:00	Cherokee, North Carolina, United States	
Win	9–2	Brandon McDowell	TKO (submission to punches)	C3 Fights: Battle on the Border 2	July 12, 2008	1	1:21	Newkirk, Oklahoma, United States	
Win	8–2	Jeremija Sanders	TKO (punches)	FTP: Global Showdown	November 3, 2007	1	0:30	Thackerville, Oklahoma, United States	
Loss	7–2	Benji Radach	TKO (punches)	IFL: 2007 Semifinals	August 2, 2007	1	3:03	East Rutherford, New Jersey, United States	Fight of the Night.
Loss	7–1	Fabio Leopoldo	Decision (split)	IFL: Connecticut	April 13, 2007	3	4:00	Uncasville, Connecticut, United States	Fight of the Night.
Win	7–0	Curtis Stout	KO (slam and punches)	Titan FC 7	March 23, 2007	1	4:57	Kansas City, Kansas, United States	
Win	6–0	Travis Fowler	Decision (unanimous)	Freestyle Cage Fighting 9	March 10, 2007	3	5:00	Ponca City, Oklahoma, United States	
Win	5–0	Harvell Hunter	KO (punches)	Freestyle Cage Fighting 8	February 10, 2007	1	N/A	Ponca City, Oklahoma, United States	
Win	4–0	Bubba McDaniel	TKO (slam)	Freestyle Cage Fighting 6	November 3, 2006	2	4:55	Tulsa, Oklahoma, United States	Won the FCF Middleweight Tournament.
Win	3–0	Joe Bunch	TKO (punches)	FCF: Brawl For It All	October 7, 2006	2	1:58	Tulsa, Oklahoma, United States	
Win	2–0	Chester Lauchner	Submission (verbal)	FCF: Brawl For It All	August 19, 2006	2	1:06	Tulsa, Oklahoma, United States	
Win	1–0	Ryan Lopez	TKO (submission to punches)	FCFP: Friday Night Fights	August 11, 2006	2	0:49	Oklahoma City, Oklahoma, United States	

== Mixed martial arts exhibition record ==
Res.	Record	Opponent	Method	Event	Date	Round	Time	Location	Notes
Loss	1–1	Amir Sadollah	TKO (punches)	The Ultimate Fighter: Team Rampage vs. Team Forrest	2008	2	2:36	Las Vegas, Nevada, United States	Preliminary bout.
Win	1–0	Mike Madallo	Decision (unanimous)	The Ultimate Fighter: Team Rampage vs. Team Forrest	2008	2	5:00	Las Vegas, Nevada, United States	Elimination bout.
