= Amir Sadollah =

American mixed martial arts fighter

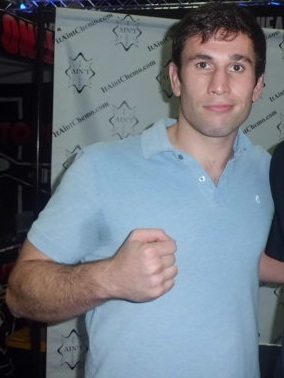
- Born: August 27, 1980 (age 46); Brooklyn, New York, United States
- Height: 5 ft 11 in (1.80 m)
- Weight: 170 lb (77 kg; 12 st)
- Division: Welterweight (2009–2014); Middleweight (2008)
- Reach: 75 in (190 cm)
- Style: Muay Thai, Sambo, Wrestling, Brazilian Jiu-Jitsu
- Stance: Orthodox
- Fighting out of: Richmond, Virginia, United States
- Team: Throwdown Training Center & Xtreme Couture
- Rank: Purple Belt in Brazilian Jiu-Jitsu; Black Pra Jiad in Muay Thai; Master of Sport in Sambo
- Years active: 2008–2014 (MMA)

Mixed martial arts record
- Total: 11
- Wins: 6
- By submission: 2
- By decision: 4
- Losses: 5
- By knockout: 1
- By decision: 4

Amateur record
- Total: 4
- Wins: 4
- By knockout: 1
- By submission: 3
- By decision: 0

Other information
- Mixed martial arts record from Sherdog

Amir Ali Sadollah (Persian: امیرعلی ﺳﻌدالله, born August 27, 1980) is a retired American mixed martial artist best known for his tenure with the Ultimate Fighting Championship (UFC), having fought in the Middleweight and Welterweight divisions, and was the winner of Spike TV's The Ultimate Fighter 7. He has fought exclusively within the confines of the UFC Octagon since the beginning of his mixed martial arts career, making him one of the few fighters to have done so.

== Mixed martial arts career ==
=== Early life and career ===
Amir Sadollah was born in Brooklyn, New York, but raised in Richmond, Virginia. He is of Iranian descent through his father, and of Irish descent through his mother. Following his graduation from John Randolph Tucker High School he attended J. Sargeant Reynolds Community College. Sadollah began training in mixed martial arts during college as a way to stay in shape. He began to take the sport more seriously after working as a surgical technologist at VCU Healthsystems and seeing similarities in the personalities of surgeons and fighters.

Sadollah trained at Combat Sports Center in Richmond, VA. Amir trained under Brian Crenshaw, Fred Corritone and Dwayne "Diesel" Shelton. Dwayne helped fine tune Amir's skills and put together his highlight reel for the application for "The Ultimate Fighter 7".

Sadollah attained an undefeated 4-0 (MMA), 3-0 (Muay Thai) amateur record during his time with Combat Sports Center and its sister promotion, Combat Sports Challenge prior to going on to the Ultimate Fighter Reality television show, first making it into the "house" and then going on to defeat four opponents to win Season 7 and a three-fight UFC contract, which, due to his outstanding performance, has been extended. Other notable professional fighters from Combat Sports Center that trained with Amir include Dwayne "Diesel" Shelton, Anthony Morrison, WEC veteran and 145 pound Ring of Combat Champion, and international Kickboxing star Francois "Bang Bang" Ambang, who came to CSC from Cameroon to join the fight team.

Sadollah's amateur record of 4–0 included a decision win, a knockout and two submissions. Sadollah was one of the 32 successful candidates out of 250 applicants at the October 2007, International Fight League draft in Chicago. He impressed Dana White and producers enough to earn a trip to Las Vegas, Nevada, to compete on The Ultimate Fighter. Amir went on to win the tournament and the title of the Ultimate Fighter. He is currently a member of Throwdown Training Center together with friend and coach Forrest Griffin.

He holds a purple belt in Brazilian Jiu-Jitsu under Cameron Diffley .

=== The Ultimate Fighter ===
Sadollah came on to the show with no professional record in MMA, and went on to win the competition. Sadollah defeated Steve Byrnes by tapout due to an armbar to win the elimination bout and get into the house.

Sadollah was the second pick for Team Forrest and fourth overall. His first preliminary fight was against Team Rampage's Gerald Harris. Sadollah defeated Harris via TKO due to strikes. Sadollah's quarter-final match was against fellow Team Forrest member and friend, Matt Brown. After a close back and forth fight, Sadollah eventually defeated Brown via tapout due to a triangle choke.

Sadollah's semi-final match was against Team Rampage's number one pick, CB Dollaway. After being put on his back for almost the whole fight, Sadollah locked up an armbar in the last minute of the last round to be the winner by submission. He was then set to face fellow Team Forrest member, Jesse Taylor at the finale to crown the winner of the tournament. However, due to Taylor's antics after taping the show, he was kicked out of the tournament and replaced by Dollaway, who had fought Tim Credeur for the spot.

=== Ultimate Fighting Championship ===
On the season finale of TUF 7, Amir earned another victory over CB Dollaway with an armbar only this time it was in the first round. The victory secured his title of The Ultimate Fighter and provided him with a six-figure UFC contract.

Sadollah's second UFC fight was scheduled to be against Nick Catone at UFC 91. However, due to a leg infection, Sadollah withdrew from the match. A replacement for Sadollah could not be found so the match was scrubbed from the card. The match was rescheduled for February 7, 2009, at UFC Fight Night 17. On January 23, Sadollah was again forced to withdraw from the fight, this time due to a broken clavicle.

Sadollah made his post-Ultimate Fighter Debut at UFC 101 on August 8, 2009, in Philadelphia (at the Wachovia Center) against Johny Hendricks. In the opening seconds of the first round, Hendricks blocked a high head kick from Sadollah and countered with an uppercut knocking Sadollah to his knees. Hendricks continued to land punches until referee Dan Miragliotta pulled him off and ended the fight 29 seconds into the first round. Some have criticized Miragliotta for stopping the fight too early, as Sadollah seemed to be trying to get up, but Miragliotta defended his stoppage saying Sadollah was "out of it" and "still looked glassy eyed and asked me what happened."

Sadollah defeated newly re-signed welterweight Phil Baroni at UFC 106. During the fight Sadollah showed a superior Muay Thai clinch and precision kicks.

Sadollah defeated Brad Blackburn on January 11, 2010, at UFC Fight Night 20 via unanimous decision. During the bout Sadollah utilized great head and body kicks along with knees in the clinch and a solid ground game.

Sadollah faced Korean judoka, Dong Hyun Kim, at UFC 114. Kim took down Sadollah in all three rounds, dominating Sadollah with superior Judo and Wrestling. Kim won the fight by unanimous decision with all three judges scoring it 30–27 for Kim.

Sadollah then faced Peter Sobotta at UFC 122. Amir would win the fight via unanimous decision. Sadollah once again demonstrated his impressive Muay Thai to earn the decision win.

Sadollah was expected to face Duane Ludwig on March 26, 2011, at UFC Fight Night 24. However, Ludwig was injured and was briefly replaced by TUF 9 winner, James Wilks. Wilks was then forced out as well and replaced by DaMarques Johnson. After a back and forth first round, Sadollah was more aggressive and forced Johnson to exchange against the cage early in the second round having success with a flurry of a strike. Sadollah would then earn a takedown and go on to gain dominant position, unleashing a steady stream of ground and pound until gaining gift wrap control, proceeding to punish Johnson with elbows from his free arm, forcing a tap due to strikes.

Sadollah lost to Duane Ludwig via unanimous decision (29–28, 29–28, 29–28) on August 14, 2011, at UFC on Versus 5.

Sadollah was expected to face Jorge Lopez on February 4, 2012, at UFC 143. However, Sadollah was forced out of the bout with an injury and replaced by Matt Riddle.

Sadollah/Lopez eventually took place on May 15, 2012, at UFC on Fuel TV: Korean Zombie vs. Poirier. Sadollah won the bout via split decision.

Sadollah lost via unanimous decision (29–28, 29–28, 30–27) to Dan Hardy on September 29, 2012, at UFC on Fuel TV 5.

Sadollah was expected to face Stephen Thompson on May 25, 2013, at UFC 160. However, Sadollah pulled out of the bout citing an injury and was replaced by Nah-Shon Burrell.

After being sidelined for nearly two years recovering from a litany of injuries, Sadollah was briefly linked to a bout with Nico Musoke on October 4, 2014, at UFC Fight Night 53. However, Sadollah was pulled from the pairing with Musoke in favor of a bout with Yoshihiro Akiyama on September 20, 2014, at UFC Fight Night 52. He lost the fight via unanimous decision and was subsequently released from the promotion. After Sadollah's release, UFC President Dana White was quoted as saying, "Amir had one of the best runs in the history of The Ultimate Fighter, but I don't think he wanted to be a fighter. You can't stay on the roster by fighting once every 2 years. At this point, he was just taking up a roster spot. We wish Amir the best of luck."

== Championships and accomplishments ==
=== Mixed martial arts ===
- Ultimate Fighting Championship
  - The Ultimate Fighter: Team Rampage vs. Team Forrest Winner
  - UFC.com Awards
    - 2008: Ranked #3 Newcomer of the Year
- MMA Fighting
  - 2008 #5 Ranked UFC Submission of the Year vs. C. B. Dollaway at The Ultimate Fighter: Team Rampage vs. Team Forrest semi-finals

=== Kickboxing ===
- World Kickboxing Association
  - WKA Amateur US Muay Thai Championship

== Mixed martial arts record ==
Professional record breakdown
11 matches	6 wins	5 losses
By knockout	1	1
By submission	1	0
By decision	4	4

Res.	Record	Opponent	Method	Event	Date	Round	Time	Location	Notes
Loss	6–5	Yoshihiro Akiyama	Decision (unanimous)	UFC Fight Night: Hunt vs. Nelson	September 20, 2014	3	5:00	Saitama, Japan	
Loss	6–4	Dan Hardy	Decision (unanimous)	UFC on Fuel TV: Struve vs. Miocic	September 29, 2012	3	5:00	Nottingham, England	
Win	6–3	Jorge Lopez	Decision (split)	UFC on Fuel TV: Korean Zombie vs. Poirier	May 15, 2012	3	5:00	Fairfax, Virginia, United States	
Loss	5–3	Duane Ludwig	Decision (unanimous)	UFC Live: Hardy vs. Lytle	August 14, 2011	3	5:00	Milwaukee, Wisconsin, United States	
Win	5–2	DaMarques Johnson	TKO (submission to elbows)	UFC Fight Night: Nogueira vs. Davis	March 26, 2011	2	3:27	Seattle, Washington, United States	
Win	4–2	Peter Sobotta	Decision (unanimous)	UFC 122	November 13, 2010	3	5:00	Oberhausen, Germany	
Loss	3–2	Dong Hyun Kim	Decision (unanimous)	UFC 114	May 29, 2010	3	5:00	Las Vegas, Nevada, United States	
Win	3–1	Brad Blackburn	Decision (unanimous)	UFC Fight Night: Maynard vs. Diaz	January 11, 2010	3	5:00	Fairfax, Virginia, United States	
Win	2–1	Phil Baroni	Decision (unanimous)	UFC 106	November 21, 2009	3	5:00	Las Vegas, Nevada, United States	
Loss	1–1	Johny Hendricks	TKO (punches)	UFC 101	August 8, 2009	1	0:29	Philadelphia, Pennsylvania, United States	Welterweight debut.
Win	1–0	C.B. Dollaway	Submission (armbar)	The Ultimate Fighter: Team Rampage vs. Team Forrest Finale	June 21, 2008	1	3:02	Las Vegas, Nevada, United States	Won The Ultimate Fighter 7 Middleweight tournament.

=== Mixed martial arts exhibition record ===
Exhibition record breakdown		
4 matches	4 wins	0 losses
By knockout	1	0
By submission	3	0

Res.	Record	Opponent	Method	Event	Date	Round	Time	Location	Notes
Win	4–0	C.B. Dollaway	Submission (armbar)	The Ultimate Fighter: Team Rampage vs. Team Forrest	March 3, 2008	3	2:52	Las Vegas, Nevada, United States	Semi-finals
Win	3–0	Matt Brown	Submission (triangle choke)	The Ultimate Fighter: Team Rampage vs. Team Forrest	February 22, 2008	2	4:09	Las Vegas, Nevada, United States	Quarter-finals
Win	2–0	Gerald Harris	TKO (knee)	The Ultimate Fighter: Team Rampage vs. Team Forrest	February 15, 2008	2	2:36	Las Vegas, Nevada, United States	Preliminary bout.
Win	1–0	Steve Byrnes	Submission (armbar)	The Ultimate Fighter: Team Rampage vs. Team Forrest	January 27, 2008	2	2:38	Las Vegas, Nevada, United States	TUF 7 entry bout.

== See also ==
- List of male mixed martial artists
