= WEC 29 =

WEC MMA event in 2007

WEC 29: Condit vs. Larson
- The poster for WEC 29: Condit vs. Larson
- Promotion: World Extreme Cagefighting
- Date: August 5, 2007
- Venue: Hard Rock Hotel and Casino
- City: Las Vegas, Nevada

Event chronology
WEC 28: WrekCage	WEC 29: Condit vs. Larson	WEC 30: McCullough vs. Crunkilton

WEC 29: Condit vs. Larson was a mixed martial arts event held by World Extreme Cagefighting. The event took place on Sunday, August 5, 2007, at the Hard Rock Hotel and Casino in Las Vegas, Nevada. The event aired live on the Versus Network.

The main event featured the WEC Welterweight title fight between champion, Carlos Condit, and challenger, Brock Larson. The show also featured the U.S. debut of PRIDE veteran Paulo Filho as he fought Joe Doerksen for the vacant WEC Middleweight title.

== Results ==
Main card
Weight class				Method	Round	Time	Notes
Welterweight	Carlos Condit (c)	def	Brock Larson	Submission (armbar)	1	2:21	(Note: For the WEC Welterweight Championship.)
Middleweight	Paulo Filho	def	Joe Doerksen	TKO (strikes)	1	4:07	(Note: For the vacant WEC Middleweight Championship.)
Featherweight	Jeff Curran	def	Stephen Ledbetter	Decision (unanimous) (30–27, 29–28, 29–28)	3	5:00
Lightweight	Jamie Varner	def	Sherron Leggett	TKO (strikes)	1	4:08
Preliminary card
Middleweight	Hiromitsu Miura	def	Fernando Gonzalez	TKO (strikes)	2	3:35
Bantamweight	Antonio Banuelos	def	Justin Robbins	Decision (unanimous) (30–26, 30–27, 30–27)	3	5:00
Middleweight	Eric Schambari	def	Logan Clark	Decision (unanimous) (29–28, 29–28, 29–28)	3	5:00
Light Heavyweight	Steve Cantwell	def	Justin McElfresh	TKO (strikes)	1	0:47
Welterweight	Blas Avena	def	Tiki Ghosn	Submission (rear naked choke)	1	1:01	(Note: Although preliminary, this bout aired on the live broadcast.)

== Reported Payouts ==
The following is the reported payout to the fighters as reported to the Nevada State Athletic Commission. It does not include sponsor money or "locker room" bonuses often given by the WEC.

- Carlos Condit: $26,000 (includes $13,000 win bonus) def. Brock Larson: $12,000
- Paulo Filho: $50,000 ($15,000 win bonus) def. Joe Doerksen: $30,000
- Jeff Curran: $10,000 ($2,000 win bonus) def. Stephen Ledbetter: $5,000
- Jamie Varner: $14,000 ($7,000 win bonus) def. Sherron Leggett: $4,000
- Hiromitsu Miura: $6,000 ($3,000 win bonus) def. Fernando Gonzalez: $3,000
- Antonio Banuelos: $8,000 ($4,000 win bonus) def. Justin Robbins: $2,000
- Eric Schambari: $8,000 ($4,000 win bonus) def. Logan Clark: $6,000
- Steve Cantwell: $6,000 ($3,000 win bonus) def. Justin McElfresh: $3,000
- Blas Avena: $4,500 ($2,000 win bonus) def. Tiki Ghosn: $5,000

== See also ==
- World Extreme Cagefighting
- List of WEC champions
- List of WEC events
- 2007 in WEC
