= Jacob Volkmann =

American mixed martial arts fighter

- Born: Jacob Joseph Volkmann; September 5, 1980 (age 46); Fergus Falls, Minnesota, U.S.
- Other names: Feelgood, Christmas
- Height: 5 ft 9 in (1.75 m)
- Weight: 155 lb (70 kg; 11.1 st)
- Division: Welterweight; Lightweight
- Reach: 71.5 in (182 cm)
- Style: Wrestling
- Stance: Southpaw
- Fighting out of: White Bear Lake, Minnesota, U.S.
- Team: Minnesota Martial Arts Academy
- Trainer: Greg Nelson
- Wrestling: NCAA Division I Wrestling
- Years active: 2007–2016

Mixed martial arts record
- Total: 26
- Wins: 19
- By knockout: 3
- By submission: 6
- By decision: 10
- Losses: 7
- By submission: 5
- By decision: 2

Other information
- University: University of Minnesota
- Mixed martial arts record from Sherdog

Jacob Joseph Volkmann (born September 5, 1980) is an American former mixed martial artist that competed in the Welterweight division. A professional MMA competitor from 2007 to 2016, Volkmann has formerly competed for the UFC, Bellator, and the World Series of Fighting.

== Background ==
Volkmann was born in Fergus Falls, Minnesota, and graduated from Henning High School in Henning, Minnesota. Volkmann wrestled for the Otter Tail Central Bulldogs and holds the schools all-time record for career wins and also won three state titles. Volkmann then attended University of Minnesota, where he was a Big Ten Conference wrestling champion and a three time NCAA All-American. In 2001 as a freshman he finished fourth, then in 2003 as junior finished third (defeating future UFC Light Heavyweight Champion Rashad Evans), and then once again as a senior in 2004 finished fourth. After graduating from Minnesota, Volkmann attended the Northwestern Health and Science University in Bloomington, Minnesota, where he earned his chiropractic doctorate and it was during this time that he also began competing in Greco-Roman wrestling at the senior level, and met UFC Lightweight Champion Sean Sherk through this program, who asked Volkmann to help train for a title fight. Volkmann later embarked on his own career in mixed martial arts.

== Mixed martial arts career ==
=== Early career ===
Volkmann started his professional MMA career in 2007, primarily competing in Minnesota where he is a member of the Minnesota Martial Arts Academy.

At Bellator 7, Volkman made his lone Bellator appearance by defeating WEC and TUF vet, Kevin Knabjian with a D'arce choke.

=== Ultimate Fighting Championship ===
In August 2009, it was announced he would be making his Ultimate Fighting Championship debut at UFC 106 against Paulo Thiago. Volkmann lost the fight via unanimous decision.

Volkmann lost his second UFC fight (after taking it on short notice) against Martin Kampmann at UFC 108 via first round submission due to a modified guillotine choke dubbed the "death choke."

He received a third chance in the Octagon at UFC Fight Night: Florian vs. Gomi against Ronys Torres, in which Volkmann moved down to lightweight. Volkmann won the fight via split decision (28–29, 30–27, 30–27), earning his first UFC win.

Volkmann was scheduled to face Paul Kelly on July 3, 2010, at UFC 116. However, the fight was moved on August 1, to the UFC on Versus: Jones vs. Matyushenko card, due to visa issues for Kelly. Volkmann defeated Kelly via unanimous decision (30-27, 30-27, 30-27).

On October 2, 2010, it was announced that Volkmann would fight former MFC lightweight champion, Antonio McKee, at UFC 125. Volkmann won via split decision. After his bout at UFC 125, Volkmann said that he wanted to fight U.S. President Barack Obama because he disagreed with his policies and asserting, "Someone needs to knock some sense into that idiot." That statement resulted in a visit from the U.S. Secret Service the following week. Volkmann has appeared on several national news shows for the comments, including The Tonight Show with Jay Leno, Inside Edition, and the Fox Business Network. Volkmann was also placed on administrative leave by White Bear Lake High School, where he is the assistant head coach of wrestling.

Volkmann next fought Danny Castillo on August 14, 2011, at UFC on Versus 5. The contest was mostly a grappling affair with Volkmann, on more than one occasion, threatening with a D'arce choke in all three rounds. He won the fight via unanimous decision (29-28 on all cards).

Volkmann was expected to face T. J. Grant on December 30, 2011, at UFC 141. However, Grant was forced from the bout with an injury and replaced by Efraín Escudero. Volkmann controlled throughout the fight, dominating Escudero on the ground for rounds one and two. Volkmann won the fight via unanimous decision. He again made waves calling out U.S. President Barack Obama after the fight stating, "Obama needs a glassectomy...It's where they remove the belly button and put a piece of glass in there, so you can see what you're doing while your head's up your ass." The post-fight comments, again, got Volkmann placed on administrative leave by the White Bear Lake High School.

Volkmann was defeated by Paul Sass via first round submission due to a triangle armbar on May 26, 2012, at UFC 146.

Volkmann was expected to face Shane Roller on September 1, 2012, at UFC 151. However, after UFC 151 was cancelled, Volkmann/Roller was rescheduled and took place on October 5, 2012, at UFC on FX 5. Volkmann took Roller down early in the fight and quickly took his back, forcing him to submit to a rear-naked choke at only 2:38 of the first round. This was Volkmann's only stoppage win in the UFC.

Volkmann faced promotional newcomer Bobby Green on February 2, 2013, at UFC 156. He lost the fight via submission due to a rear-naked choke in the third round. Following the loss, Volkmann was released from the promotion.

=== World Series of Fighting ===
A week after his UFC departure Volkmann was announced as the newest addition to the World Series of Fighting ranks.

Volkmann made his WSOF debut vs. Strikeforce vet Lyle Beerbohm at WSOF 3, on June 14. He won via unanimous decision. After the fight it emerged that Volkmann had suffered a seizure and blacked out before weigh-ins after becoming dehydrated from the weight-cut.

=== Other promotions ===
Volkmann defeated Danny White in a 165lb Catchweight bout at Dakota FC 18: Spring Brawl on April 26, 2014. He then faced UFC veteran T. J. O'Brien at Pinnacle Combat 16 on May 9, 2014. Volkmann lost the fight via guillotine choke.

He was set to make his debut in Maximum Fighting Championship against Andrew McInnes on October 3, 2014, at MFC 41. However, this fight never came to fruition and Volkmann didn't fight for the company.

== Personal life ==
Volkmann has three children. He is divorced. Volkmann is also a chiropractor and runs a clinic.

== Championships and awards ==
=== Grappling ===
- International Federation of Associated Wrestling Styles
  - World Champion (2008)
  - USA Grappling Midwest Regional Champion (2008)
  - USA Grappling National Champion (2008)
  - USA Grappling Runner Up (2009) (2010)

=== Collegiate wrestling ===
- National Collegiate Athletic Association
  - NCAA Division I All-American out of University of Minnesota (2001), (2003), (2004)
  - NCAA Division I 174 1b - 4th place out of University of Minnesota (2001)
  - NCAA Division I 165 1b - 3rd place out of University of Minnesota (2003)
  - NCAA Division I 165 1b - 4th place out of University of Minnesota (2004)

=== Mixed martial arts ===
- Victory Fighting Championship
  - VFC Welterweight Championship (One time)

== Mixed martial arts record ==
Professional record breakdown
26 matches	19 wins	7 losses
By knockout	3	0
By submission	6	5
By decision	10	2

Res.	Record	Opponent	Method	Event	Date	Round	Time	Location	Notes
Loss	19–7	Ben Saunders	Submission (armbar)	Fight Night at the Island	September 9, 2016	1	0:17	Welch, Minnesota, United States	
Win	19–6	Antonio Trócoli	Decision (unanimous)	Legacy FC 51: Ramos vs. Vasquez	February 5, 2016	3	5:00	Hinckley, Minnesota, United States	
Win	18–6	Zak Ottow	Technical Submission (D'Arce choke)	Legacy FC 43: Larson vs. Krantz	July 17, 2015	1	4:55	Hinckley, Minnesota, United States	
Loss	17–6	T. J. O'Brien	Submission (guillotine choke)	Pinnacle Combat 16	May 9, 2014	1	2:14	Dubuque, Iowa, United States	
Win	17–5	Danny White	TKO (elbows and punches)	Dakota FC 18: Spring Brawl	April 26, 2014	2	3:45	Fargo, North Dakota, United States	Catchweight bout of 165 lbs.
Loss	16–5	Luiz Firmino	Decision (unanimous)	World Series of Fighting 6	October 26, 2013	3	5:00	Coral Gables, Florida, United States	
Win	16–4	Lyle Beerbohm	Decision (unanimous)	World Series of Fighting 3	June 14, 2013	3	5:00	Las Vegas, Nevada, United States	
Loss	15–4	Bobby Green	Submission (rear-naked choke)	UFC 156	February 2, 2013	3	4:25	Las Vegas, Nevada, United States	
Win	15–3	Shane Roller	Submission (rear-naked choke)	UFC on FX: Browne vs. Bigfoot	October 5, 2012	1	2:38	Minneapolis, Minnesota, United States	
Loss	14–3	Paul Sass	Submission (triangle armbar)	UFC 146	May 26, 2012	1	1:54	Las Vegas, Nevada, United States	
Win	14–2	Efraín Escudero	Decision (unanimous)	UFC 141	December 30, 2011	3	5:00	Las Vegas, Nevada, United States	
Win	13–2	Danny Castillo	Decision (unanimous)	UFC Live: Hardy vs. Lytle	August 14, 2011	3	5:00	Milwaukee, Wisconsin, United States	
Win	12–2	Antonio McKee	Decision (split)	UFC 125	January 1, 2011	3	5:00	Las Vegas, Nevada, United States	
Win	11–2	Paul Kelly	Decision (unanimous)	UFC Live: Jones vs. Matyushenko	August 1, 2010	3	5:00	San Diego, California, United States	
Win	10–2	Ronys Torres	Decision (split)	UFC Fight Night: Florian vs. Gomi	March 31, 2010	3	5:00	Charlotte, North Carolina, United States	Lightweight debut.
Loss	9–2	Martin Kampmann	Submission (guillotine choke)	UFC 108	January 2, 2010	1	4:03	Las Vegas, Nevada, United States	
Loss	9–1	Paulo Thiago	Decision (unanimous)	UFC 106	November 21, 2009	3	5:00	Las Vegas, Nevada, United States	
Win	9–0	Kevin Knabjian	Submission (D'arce choke)	Bellator 7	May 15, 2009	2	1:42	Chicago, Illinois, United States	
Win	8–0	Bobby Voelker	Decision (unanimous)	Victory FC 25: Primetime	December 5, 2008	5	5:00	Council Bluffs, Iowa, United States	Won the VFC Welterweight Championship.
Win	7–0	Steve Merth	Submission (rear-naked choke)	Brutaal Fight Night XIX	September 5, 2008	1	3:52	Maplewood, Minnesota, United States	
Win	6–0	Travis McCullough	TKO (submission to strikes)	Max Fights 4	July 19, 2008	1	0:51	Fargo, North Dakota, United States	
Win	5–0	Wayne Hajicek	Submission (rear-naked choke)	Max Fights 3	April 26, 2008	1	0:34	Fargo, North Dakota, United States	
Win	4–0	Brent Mehrhoff	Decision (unanimous)	Xtreme Fighting Organization 22	February 23, 2008	3	5:00	Crystal Lake, Illinois, United States	
Win	3–0	Caleb Wolff	Submission (triangle choke)	Brutaal Fight Night IV	January 11, 2008	1	N/A	Maplewood, Minnesota, United States	
Win	2–0	Nathan Oliver	Decision (unanimous)	Ultimate Combat Sports: Battle on the Bay 8	October 20, 2007	N/A	N/A	Superior, Wisconsin, United States	
Win	1–0	Chaylen Rader	TKO (submission to strikes)	Cage Fighting Xtreme 6	September 29, 2007	1	2:17	Brainerd, Minnesota, United States	
