= Brock Larson =

American mixed martial arts fighter

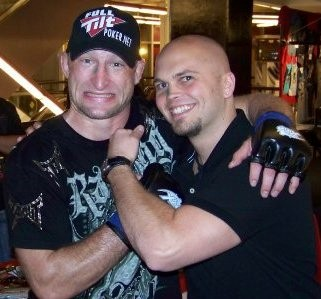
- Brock Larson (left) in 2010
- Born: August 23, 1977 (age 49); Brainerd, Minnesota, United States
- Height: 5 ft 11 in (1.80 m)
- Weight: 185 lb (84 kg; 13.2 st)
- Division: Middleweight; Welterweight
- Reach: 71 in (180 cm)
- Stance: Southpaw
- Fighting out of: Brainerd, Minnesota, United States
- Team: American Top Team
- Rank: Black belt in Brazilian Jiu-Jitsu under Dave Camarillo
- Years active: 2002–2016

Mixed martial arts record
- Total: 52
- Wins: 42
- By knockout: 16
- By submission: 20
- By decision: 5
- By disqualification: 1
- Losses: 10
- By knockout: 3
- By submission: 2
- By decision: 5

Other information
- Mixed martial arts record from Sherdog

Brock Orville Larson (born August 23, 1977) is a retired American professional mixed martial artist who competed in the Welterweight and Middleweight divisions. A professional competitor from 2002 until 2016, Larson has formerly competed for the UFC, the WEC, and ONE FC.

== Background ==
Larson is from Brainerd, Minnesota, and was raised on a beef farm. Larson began competing in wrestling from a young age, continuing with the sport at Brainerd High School. Later while attending Itasca Community College, Larson was introduced to Brazilian jiu-jitsu by a friend. The two later competed in a Minnesota Martial Arts Academy submission tournament, with each winning and earning invites to train with future UFC Lightweight Champion Sean Sherk. Larson also defeated former UFC fighter Tom Speer in an all-grappling match.

== Mixed martial arts career ==
=== Early career ===
Larson made his professional mixed martial arts debut in 2002 and compiled an undefeated record of 15–0 while competing in the regional circuit before being signed by the UFC.

=== Ultimate Fighting Championship ===
Larson made his UFC debut at UFC Fight Night 2 on October 3, 2005, in a Middleweight bout against Jon Fitch. Larson lost via unanimous decision.

After winning his next six consecutive fights, Larson returned to the promotion at UFC Fight Night 7 on December 13, 2006, where he faced Keita Nakamura. Larson won via unanimous decision.

=== World Extreme Cagefighting ===
Larson then transitioned into the WEC, making his promotional debut at WEC 26: Condit vs. Alessio against Erik Apple on April 24, 2007. Larson won via kimura submission in the first round. Larson made his next appearance on June 3, 2007, against Kevin Knabjian at WEC 28 and won via TKO 27 seconds into the first round. With a 2-0 promotional record and a nine-fight winning streak, Larson was offered a fight for the WEC Welterweight Championship against then-champion Carlos Condit at WEC 29 on August 5, 2007, and was defeated in the first round via armbar submission.

In December 2008, the WEC Welterweight division merged with the UFC's Welterweight division after the promotion decided to focus on lower weight classes.

=== UFC return ===
Larson made his UFC return against Jesse Sanders, and won via rear-naked choke submission at UFC Fight Night: Condit vs. Kampmann on April 1, 2009.

Larson then fought at UFC 98, defeating Mike Pyle by arm-triangle choke submission in round one, earning Submission of the Night honors.

At UFC 106 he fought Brian Foster. Larson had two points deducted in the first round for an illegal kick and an illegal knee before being defeated in the second round by technical knockout on November 21, 2009, at UFC 106. Following the loss, Larson was cut by the UFC.

=== Post-UFC ===
After going 3-0 in regional competition after his UFC release, Larson faced future Strikeforce Welterweight Champion Tarec Saffiedine on September 11, 2010, at Shark Fights 13 and lost via unanimous decision.

Larson next faced Gabe Wallbridge on October 29, 2010, at King of the Cage: Mainstream. He won by submission due to strikes in the first round.

=== ONE FC ===
Larson was signed by ONE FC and made his promotional debut against Melvin Manhoef at ONE Fighting Championship: Kings and Champions on April 5, 2013, and won via unanimous decision.

Larson then faced Nobutatsu Suzuki for the inaugural ONE FC Welterweight Championship on March 14, 2014, at ONE FC: War of Nations. He lost the fight via unanimous decision.

=== Legacy FC and retirement ===
Larson made his debut for Legacy Fighting Championship in July 2015. He challenged Derrick Krantz for the Legacy FC Welterweight Championship, but ended up losing the bout via knockout in the third round.

In his second fight for the promotion, Larson faced Travis Coyle on February 5, 2016, at Legacy FC 51. He was in trouble early on as Coyle locked on a guillotine choke; however, Larson survived the various submission attempts and ended up winning the fight via TKO in the first round. Post-fight, Larson's team awarded him with a personalized belt marking his years of competition from 2002-2016 and he retired from active MMA competition in order to concentrate on coaching.

== Personal life ==
Larson has three children. Before fighting professionally, Larson worked in road construction. Brock currently is the head professor at START BJJ MN.

== Championships and accomplishments ==
- Ultimate Fighting Championship
  - Submission of the Night (One time) vs. Mike Pyle
- World Extreme Cagefighting
  - Knockout of the Night (One time) vs. Carlo Prater

== Mixed martial arts record ==
Professional record breakdown
52 matches	42 wins	10 losses
By knockout	16	3
By submission	20	2
By decision	5	5
By disqualification	1	0

Res.	Record	Opponent	Method	Event	Date	Round	Time	Location	Notes
Win	42–10	Travis Coyle	TKO (punches)	Legacy FC 51: Ramos vs. Vasquez	February 5, 2016	1	2:03	Hinckley, Minnesota, United States	Catchweight (175 lbs) bout.
Loss	41–10	Derrick Krantz	KO (punches)	Legacy FC 43: Larson vs. Krantz	July 17, 2015	3	2:38	Hinckley, Minnesota, United States	For the vacant Legacy FC Welterweight Championship.
Win	41–9	Kyle Olsen	TKO (punches)	KOTC: Bad Blood	May 2, 2015	1	1:41	Saint Michael, North Dakota, United States	
Win	40–9	Eddie Larrea	TKO (punches)	KOTC: Fighting Spirit	January 17, 2015	1	1:57	Saint Michael, North Dakota, United States	Return to Middleweight.
Loss	39–9	Roan Carneiro	Decision (unanimous)	BattleGrounds MMA 5: O.N.E.	October 3, 2014	3	5:00	Tulsa, Oklahoma, United States	BattleGrounds MMA 5: Welterweight Tournament Finals.
Win	39–8	Joe Ray	Decision (unanimous)	BattleGrounds MMA 5: O.N.E.	October 3, 2014	3	5:00	Tulsa, Oklahoma, United States	BattleGrounds MMA 5: Welterweight Tournament Semifinal.
Win	38–8	Cody McKenzie	Submission (arm-triangle choke)	BattleGrounds MMA 5: O.N.E.	October 3, 2014	2	1:43	Tulsa, Oklahoma, United States	BattleGrounds MMA 5: Welterweight Tournament Quarterfinal.
Loss	37–8	Nobutatsu Suzuki	Decision (unanimous)	ONE FC: War of Nations	March 14, 2014	5	5:00	Kuala Lumpur, Malaysia	For the inaugural ONE FC Welterweight Championship.
Win	37–7	Melvin Manhoef	Decision (unanimous)	ONE FC: Kings and Champions	April 5, 2013	3	5:00	Kallang, Singapore	Middleweight bout.
Win	36–7	Eduardo Pamplona	Decision (unanimous)	Resurrection Fighting Alliance 6	January 18, 2013	3	5:00	Kansas City, Missouri, United States	
Win	35–7	Anthony Lemon	Submission (armbar)	KOTC: Fire and Ice	December 1, 2012	1	3:20	Walker, Minnesota United States	Return to Welterweight.
Win	34–7	Lucas St. Clair	Submission (Von Flue choke)	Cage Fighting Extreme 38	September 1, 2012	1	1:00	Sauk Rapids, Minnesota, United States	
Loss	33–7	Antônio Braga Neto	Submission (kneebar)	MMAAD: MMA Against Dengue 2	March 4, 2012	1	1:04	Rio de Janeiro, Brazil	Middleweight bout.
Loss	33–6	Eric Davila	KO (punch)	Extreme Challenge 188: Larson vs. Davila	July 23, 2011	1	0:07	Minneapolis, Minnesota, United States	
Win	33–5	Gabe Wallbridge	TKO (submission to punches)	KOTC: Mainstream	October 29, 2010	1	1:13	Morton, Minnesota, United States	
Loss	32–5	Tarec Saffiedine	Decision (unanimous)	Shark Fights 13: Jardine vs Prangley	September 11, 2010	3	5:00	Amarillo, Texas, United States	
Win	32–4	Eddie Larrea	Submission (kimura)	Gladiator Evolution/Cage Fighting Xtreme	August 14, 2010	1	2:05	Brockton, Massachusetts, United States	
Win	31–4	Nick Almen	TKO (punches)	CFX: Cage Fighting Xtreme	May 15, 2010	1	0:30	Red Lake, Minnesota, United States	
Win	30–4	Brian Green	Submission (rear-naked choke)	CFX / XKL: Mayhem in Minneapolis	April 24, 2010	1	4:39	Minneapolis, Minnesota, United States	
Loss	29–4	Brian Foster	TKO (submission to punches)	UFC 106	November 21, 2009	2	3:25	Las Vegas, Nevada, United States	
Loss	29–3	Mike Pierce	Decision (unanimous)	UFC Fight Night: Diaz vs. Guillard	September 16, 2009	3	5:00	Oklahoma City, Oklahoma, United States	
Win	29–2	Mike Pyle	Submission (arm-triangle choke)	UFC 98	May 23, 2009	1	3:06	Las Vegas, Nevada, United States	Submission of the Night.
Win	28–2	Jesse Sanders	Submission (rear-naked choke)	UFC Fight Night: Condit vs. Kampmann	April 1, 2009	1	2:01	Nashville, Tennessee, United States	
Win	27–2	Carlo Prater	KO (punches)	WEC 35: Condit vs. Miura	August 3, 2008	1	0:37	Las Vegas, Nevada, United States	Knockout of the Night.
Win	26–2	John Alessio	DQ (knee to downed fighter)	WEC 33: Marshall vs. Stann	March 26, 2008	1	1:50	Las Vegas, Nevada, United States	
Win	25–2	Troy Allison	Submission (rear-naked choke)	CFX 7: Brutal	November 29, 2007	1	N/A	St. Cloud, Minnesota, United States	
Loss	24–2	Carlos Condit	Submission (armbar)	WEC 29	August 5, 2007	1	2:21	Las Vegas, Nevada, United States	For the WEC Welterweight Championship.
Win	24–1	Kevin Knabjian	TKO (punches)	WEC 28	June 3, 2007	1	0:27	Las Vegas, Nevada, United States	
Win	23–1	Erik Apple	Submission (kimura)	WEC 26: Condit vs. Alessio	March 24, 2007	1	3:43	Las Vegas, Nevada, United States	
Win	22–1	Keita Nakamura	Decision (unanimous)	UFC Fight Night: Sanchez vs. Riggs	December 13, 2006	3	5:00	San Diego, California, United States	Welterweight debut.
Win	21–1	Edward O'Daniel	Submission (Von Flue choke)	Extreme Challenge 70	August 26, 2006	1	2:21	Hayward, Wisconsin, United States	
Win	20–1	Manuel Quiroz	Submission (rear-naked choke)	Extreme Challenge 67	June 30, 2006	1	0:42	Medina, Minnesota, United States	
Win	19–1	Alex Carter	TKO (submission to punches)	CFX 4: Cage Fighting Xtreme 4	April 22, 2006	1	N/A	Plymouth, Minnesota, United States	
Win	18–1	Kenneth Allen	Submission (guillotine choke)	TCT: Twin Cities Throwdown	April 8, 2006	1	N/A	Burnsville, Minnesota, United States	
Win	17–1	Ray Perales	Submission (rear-naked choke)	IFC: Rumble on the River	March 11, 2006	1	1:05	Kearney, Nebraska, United States	
Win	16–1	Shannon Ritch	TKO (punches)	Extreme Challenge 66	February 17, 2006	1	1:16	Medina, Minnesota, United States	
Loss	15–1	Jon Fitch	Decision (unanimous)	UFC Ultimate Fight Night 2	October 3, 2005	3	5:00	Las Vegas, Nevada, United States	
Win	15–0	Ryan McGivern	Submission (keylock)	Extreme Challenge 63	July 23, 2005	1	2:09	Hayward, Wisconsin, United States	Won the EC Middleweight Tournament.
Win	14–0	Ryan Jensen	TKO (submission to punches)	Extreme Challenge 63	July 23, 2005	1	1:39	Hayward, Wisconsin, United States	EC Middleweight Tournament Semifinals.
Win	13–0	DaMarques Johnson	Submission (keylock)	Extreme Challenge 63	July 23, 2005	3	1:02	Hayward, Wisconsin, United States	EC Middleweight Tournament Quarterfinals.
Win	12–0	Miguel Cooley	TKO (submission to punches)	CFX 3: Cage Fighting Xtreme 3	April 23, 2005	1	N/A	Brainerd, Minnesota, United States	
Win	11–0	Stephan Potvin	Decision (unanimous)	IFC WC 19: Warriors Challenge 19	March 26, 2005	5	5:00	Sault Ste Marie, Michigan, United States	
Win	10–0	Darin Brudigan	Submission (arm-triangle choke)	XKK: Fridley	February 5, 2005	2	4:50	Fridley, Minnesota, United States	
Win	9–0	Mark Smolinski	TKO (punches)	CFX 2: Cage Fighting Xtreme 2	September 4, 2004	1	N/A	Brainerd, Minnesota, United States	
Win	8–0	Miguel Cooley	TKO (punches)	ICC: Trials 2	April 30, 2004	1	N/A	Rochester, Minnesota, United States	
Win	7–0	Nick Beasley	TKO (submission to punches)	DFC 1: Dakota Fighting Championships 1	April 17, 2004	1	1:04	Fargo, North Dakota, United States	
Win	6–0	James Fuller	Submission (armbar)	CFX 1: Cage Fighting Xtreme 1	April 3, 2004	1	N/A	Brainerd, Minnesota, United States	
Win	5–0	Alex Gasson	Submission (armbar)	ICC: Trials	March 12, 2004	2	4:13	Fridley, Minnesota, United States	
Win	4–0	Brian Maceachern	Submission (armbar)	ICC: Trials	March 12, 2004	1	1:56	Fridley, Minnesota, United States	
Win	3–0	Kyle Olsen	TKO (submission to punches)	SS: Sabin Showdown	April 26, 2003	1	2:20	Moorhead, Minnesota, United States	
Win	2–0	Luke Caudillo	Submission (keylock)	IWW: Iowa Winter Warriors	January 25, 2003	N/A	N/A	Spirit Lake, Iowa, United States	
Win	1–0	Josh Hartwell	TKO (submission to punches)	ARCF 7: American Reality Combat 7	October 19, 2002	1	0:46	Alexandria, Minnesota, United States	

== See also ==
- List of male mixed martial artists
- List of Brazilian jiu-jitsu practitioners
