= UFC Fight Night: Maynard vs. Diaz =

UFC mixed martial arts event in 2010

- The poster for UFC Fight Night: Maynard vs. Diaz
- Promotion: Ultimate Fighting Championship
- Date: January 11, 2010
- Venue: Patriot Center
- City: Fairfax, Virginia
- Attendance: 8,078
- Total gate: $753,962

Event chronology
UFC 108: Evans vs. Silva	UFC Fight Night: Maynard vs. Diaz	UFC 109: Relentless

UFC Fight Night: Maynard vs. Diaz (also known as UFC Fight Night 20) was a mixed martial arts event held by the Ultimate Fighting Championship (UFC) on January 11, 2010, at the Patriot Center in Fairfax, Virginia.

== Background ==
Headlining this event was a rematch between Gray Maynard And The Ultimate Fighter 5 Winner Nate Diaz, The two faced each other on The Ultimate Fighter 5 Semi-Finals in an amateur bout, which Diaz won via submission (guillotine choke).

Nik Lentz was expected to face Jeremy Stephens at the event. However, Stephens pulled out of the bout with an injury and was replaced by Thiago Tavares.

A bout between Josh Koscheck and Mike Pierce was expected to take place on this card. However, Koscheck was shifted from this event to a bout with Anthony Johnson at UFC 106, while Pierce would face Jon Fitch at UFC 107.

Mike Massenzio was expected to face Gerald Harris, but was forced off the card with an injury and replaced by John Salter.

== Results ==
Main card (Spike TV)
Weight class				Method	Round	Time	Notes
Lightweight	Gray Maynard	def.	Nate Diaz	Decision (split) (28–29, 30–27, 29–28)	3	5:00
Lightweight	Evan Dunham	def.	Efraín Escudero	Submission (armbar)	3	1:59
Middleweight	Aaron Simpson	def.	Tom Lawlor	Decision (split) (28–29, 29–28, 29–28)	3	5:00
Welterweight	Amir Sadollah	def.	Brad Blackburn	Decision (unanimous) (30–27, 30–27, 30–27)	3	5:00
Preliminary card
Middleweight	Chris Leben	def.	Jay Silva	Decision (unanimous) (30–27, 30–27, 30–27)	3	5:00
Welterweight	Rick Story	def.	Jesse Lennox	Decision (split) (30–27, 30–27, 28–29)	3	5:00	(Note: Due to a scoring error, this bout was initially announced as a majority decision.)
Lightweight	Thiago Tavares	vs.	Nik Lentz	Draw (majority) (28–28, 28–28, 27–29)	3	5:00	(Note: Tavares had 1 point deducted in round 3 for a second kick to the groin.)
Welterweight	Rory MacDonald	def.	Mike Guymon	Submission (armbar)	1	4:27
Lightweight	Rafael dos Anjos	def.	Kyle Bradley	Decision (unanimous) (30–27, 30–27, 30–27)	3	5:00
Middleweight	Gerald Harris	def.	John Salter	TKO (punches)	3	3:24
Middleweight	Nick Catone	def.	Jesse Forbes	Decision (split) (29–28, 29–28, 28–29)	3	5:00

== Bonus awards ==
The following fighters received $30,000 bonuses.

- Fight of the Night: Tom Lawlor vs. Aaron Simpson
- Knockout of the Night: Gerald Harris
- Submission of the Night: Evan Dunham

== Reported payout ==
The following is the reported payout to the fighters as reported to the Virginia Department of Professional and Occupational Regulation. It does not include sponsor money or "locker room" bonuses often given by the UFC and also do not include the UFC's traditional "fight night" bonuses.

- Gray Maynard: $40,000 (includes $20,000 win bonus) def. Nate Diaz: $24,000
- Evan Dunham: $18,000 ($9,000 win bonus) def. Efrain Escudero: $15,000
- Aaron Simpson: $22,000 ($11,000 win bonus) def. Tom Lawlor: $10,000
- Amir Sadollah: $30,000 ($15,000 win bonus) def. Brad Blackburn: $13,000
- Chris Leben: $60,000 ($30,000 win bonus) def. Jay Silva: $6,000
- Rick Story: $10,000 ($5,000 win bonus) def. Jesse Lennox: $7,000
- Nick Lentz: $7,000 vs. Thiago Tavares: $15,000 ^
- Rory MacDonald: $12,000 ($6,000 win bonus) def. Mike Guymon: $6,000
- Rafael dos Anjos: $16,000 ($8,000 win bonus) def. Kyle Bradley: $8,000
- Gerald Harris: $12,000 ($6,000 win bonus) def. John Salter: $6,000
- Nick Catone: $14,000 ($7,000 win bonus) def. Jesse Forbes: $6,000

^ Both fighters earned show money; bout declared majority draw.

== See also ==
- Ultimate Fighting Championship
- List of UFC champions
- List of UFC events
- 2010 in UFC
