= The Ultimate Fighter: Team Rampage vs. Team Forrest =

UFC mixed martial arts television series and event in 2008

- Genre: Reality, Sports
- Created by: Craig Piligian, Frank Fertitta III, Lorenzo Fertitta, Dana White
- Starring: Dana White, Forrest Griffin, and Quinton Jackson
- Country of origin: United States

Production
- Running time: 60 minutes

Original release
- Network: Spike
- Release: April 2 – June 21, 2008

The Ultimate Fighter: Team Rampage vs. Team Forrest was the seventh season of the Ultimate Fighting Championship (UFC) produced reality television series The Ultimate Fighter, and premiered on April 2, 2008 on Spike, after UFC Fight Night 13. Unlike several other seasons which focused on two weight classes, season 7 featured only Middleweight fighters (171–185 lb).

UFC Light Heavyweight Champion Quinton Jackson starred as a coach, opposite light heavyweight #1 contender Forrest Griffin, who coached the opposing team. The two fighters fought for the UFC light heavyweight title after the completion of the series at UFC 86 at which time Griffin won becoming the new Light Heavyweight Champion.

In a change from previous seasons, season 7 began with 32 fighters arriving at the UFC training center instead of the usual 16. UFC president Dana White told the fighters that over the previous six seasons, he had become fed up with contestants not training and competing as hard as they could, or complaining about various issues on the show. His solution was for the fighters to earn their way into the house by winning a fight before the show even started. The first two episodes were a compilation of the entry fights.

== Cast ==
=== Coaches ===
- Team Rampage
  - Quinton "Rampage" Jackson, head coach
  - Zach Light, wrestling coach
  - Juanito Ibarra, boxing coach
- Team Forrest
  - Forrest Griffin, head coach
  - Cameron Diffley, jiu jitsu coach
  - Mark Beecher, Muay Thai coach
  - Gray Maynard, wrestling coach

=== Fighters ===
- Team Rampage
  - C. B. Dollaway, Matt Riddle, Paul Bradley (*Patrick Schultz), Dan Cramer, Gerald Harris, Mike Dolce, Jeremy May, Brandon Sene
- Team Forrest
  - Tim Credeur, Amir Sadollah, Jesse Taylor, Matt Brown, Cale Yarbrough, Dante Rivera, Nick Klein, Luke Zachrich

* Bradley was removed on episode 3 due to a contagious disease. He was replaced by Schultz.

- Fighters Eliminated in or before Entry Round:
  - David Baggett, Steve Byrnes, Erik Charles, John Clarke, Josh Hall, Mike Marrello, Prince McLean, Aaron Meisner, David Mewborn, Reggie Orr, Jeremiah Riggs, David Roberts, Nick Rossborough, Dan Simmler, John Wood

=== Others ===
- Host: Dana White
- Narrator: Mike Rowe

== Episodes ==
Episode 1 – No Posers

- Dana White introduces light heavyweight champion Quinton "Rampage" Jackson and Forrest Griffin as the coaches, and tells the 32 fighters the reason there are so many for this season is because he is tired of posers. White tells them that this season, they will fight to earn the right.
- These four fights are shown in their entirety on the show:
  - Mike Dolce defeated Prince McLean by KO (punches) at 1:21 in the first round.
  - Cale Yarbrough defeated John Clarke by TKO (punches) at 4:02 in the first round.
  - Amir Sadollah defeated Steve Byrnes by submission (armlock) at 2:22 in the second round.
  - Jeremy May defeated David Roberts by submission (armlock) at 1:17 in the first round.
- These four fights are shown by highlights and the end result of the fight only:
  - C. B. Dollaway defeated David Baggett by TKO (punches) at 1:29 in the first round.
  - Dante Rivera defeated John Wood by submission (kimura) at 0:58 in the first round.
  - Nick Klein defeated David Mewborn by submission (arm triangle choke) at 3:39 in the first round.
  - Paul Bradley defeated Reggie Orr by decision after two rounds.

Episode 2 – No Losers Here

- These five fights are shown in their entirety on the show:
  - Matt Riddle defeated Dan Simmler by KO (punches) at :09 in the second round.
- Simmler's jaw was broken and he was taken away in an ambulance.
  - Luke Zachrich defeated Patrick Schultz by submission (rear naked choke) at 2:29 in the first round.
  - Tim Credeur defeated Erik Charles by submission (armbar) at 1:00 in the first round.
  - Jesse Taylor defeated Nick Rossborough by submission (rear naked choke) at 1:50 in first round.
  - Matt Brown defeated Josh Hall by TKO (punches) at 4:57 in first round.
- These three fights are shown by highlights and the result of the fight only:
  - Brandon Sene defeated Aaron Meisner by submission (rear naked choke) at 3:29 in the second round.
  - Gerald Harris defeated Mike Marrello by unanimous decision after two rounds.
  - Dan Cramer defeated Jeremiah Riggs by unanimous decision after two rounds.

Episode 3 – The Heebie-Jeebies

- The teams are picked and White flips a coin (blue for Rampage, brown for Forrest). Jackson wins the coin toss and chooses to pick the first fighter, giving Griffin the first fight selection.

Coach	1st Pick	2nd Pick	3rd Pick	4th Pick	5th Pick	6th Pick	7th Pick	8th Pick
Rampage	C. B. Dollaway	Matt Riddle	Paul Bradley	Dan Cramer	Gerald Harris	Mike Dolce	Jeremy May	Brandon Sene
Forrest	Tim Credeur	Amir Sadollah	Jesse Taylor	Matt Brown	Cale Yarbrough	Dante Rivera	Nick Klein	Luke Zachrich

- Bradley is removed from the house because of a contagious skin condition, so Patrick Schultz is brought back as his replacement.
- Team Forrest selects Taylor to fight Dolce.
- Jesse Taylor defeated Mike Dolce by submission (rear naked choke) at 1:47 of the second round.
- Team Forrest retains control of the fight selections.

Episode 4 – Everything to Lose

- Dante Rivera shows disrespect towards Riddle, saying that he will go into retirement if the younger man beats him in a fight.
- Team Forrest selects Credeur to fight Riddle.
- Rivera continues to ridicule Riddle at the house, claiming he has been in his head since they met. Rivera keeps insisting Riddle to bet him $500 that he would not make it out of the first round.
- Tim Credeur defeated Matt Riddle by submission (armbar) at 4:06 of the second round.
- Team Forrest retains control of the fight selections.

Episode 5 – Chewbacle

- Jackson brings in TUF 3 winner Michael Bisping as a guest trainer for his team.
- At the house, Jeremy May pours lime juice in Matt Brown's tobacco, and Brown becomes angry and wants to fight him.
- Team Forrest selects Rivera to fight Sene.
- Dante Rivera defeated Brandon Sene by decision after three rounds.
- After the fight, Jackson loses his temper because he and White thought that Sene should have won the fight for doing more damage than Rivera.
- Team Forrest retains control of the fight selections, choosing Brown to fight May in the next episode.

Episode 6 – Piece of Meat

- Matt Brown defeats Jeremy May by KO (head kick) at 3:35 of the first round.
- White calls it one of the coolest knockouts he had seen in the history of TUF. Members of both teams wanted Brown to win due to May's behavior in the house.
- Team Forrest selects Zachrich to fight Cramer.
- Griffin's method of letting his members decide who will fight by flipping a coin frustrates Jackson.
- Dan Cramer defeated Luke Zachrich by TKO (strikes) at 1:49 of the second round.
- Team Rampage gains control of the fight selections.

Episode 7 – Under the Radar

- Team Rampage picks Harris to fight Sadollah.
- Amir Sadollah defeats Gerald Harris by TKO (strikes) at 2:36 of the second round.
- Harris throws a fit in Team Rampage's room and sobs that he put everything on that fight.
- Team Forrest regains control of the fight picks for the final two fights.
- The brown team picks Yarbrough to fight Schultz. This leaves Nick Klein to fight CB Dollaway.
- Cale Yarbrough defeated Patrick Schultz by majority decision after two rounds.
- There was controversy over the decision including demands from Jackson that the fight should go to a third round. This leads to a verbal argument between the coaches ending with Jackson saying he would bet his purse that his fight with Griffin would not go to decision.

Episode 8 – Mean and Nasty

- Jackson destroys a door after Griffin says he would bet his purse that his fight with him will not go to a decision.
- Griffin pranks Jackson by using a net gun to shoot a net to him while he was sitting on the cage.
- C. B. Dollaway defeated Nick Klein by submission (guillotine choke) at 2:41 in the second round.
- Yarbrough rubs Dollaway and Matt Riddle the wrong way by making fun of them because they had the same sunglasses.
- Sadollah cuts Griffin's hair. After that, Jackson returns the prank to Griffin by soaking him with a water gun.
- After the coaches meet with him, White reveals the quarterfinal matches. They are:
  - Jesse Taylor vs. Dante Rivera
  - Amir Sadollah vs. Matt Brown
  - Dan Cramer vs. Tim Credeur
  - C. B. Dollaway vs. Cale Yarbrough

Episode 9 – Throwing Bombs

- After flipping a coin, it is decided that Griffin will corner both Taylor and Sadollah, meaning that Team Forrest fighters Rivera and Brown will be cornered by Jackson.
- Other fighters in the house wonder why Taylor can eat so unhealthy and drink alcohol so much, and still be more in shape and physically fit than them.
- Jesse Taylor defeated Dante Rivera by unanimous decision after two rounds.
- Amir Sadollah defeated Matt Brown by submission (triangle choke) at 4:09 in the second round.

Episode 10 – Losers Go Home

- Jeremy May causes more problems for himself by first challenging Matt Brown to a rematch right after his loss. Then he makes insulting and anti-Semitic comments to Jesse Taylor (who is part Jewish) in an attempt to goad the Team Forrest member into hitting him. This would result in Taylor being forced off the show and out of the tournament.
- Tim Credeur defeated Dan Cramer with a submission (heel lock) at 2:10 in the first round.
- The coaches take both teams out one night to Pole Position Raceway to race go-karts because they have been working so hard and deserved a break.
- When the fighters return from racing go-karts, they begin to drink, and in turn, tear up the house.
- C. B. Dollaway defeated Cale Yarbrough by TKO (strikes) at 2:43 in the first round.
- Jackson is late to the meeting to decide the semifinal matches, so Griffin and White interview the fighters. White's choices are the exact opposite of what Griffin wants for his fighters. Griffin is upset about match-ups since he was "brown-nosing" White all season and especially since was on time for the meeting, and Jackson was not.
- Credeur will fight Taylor in the first semifinal match.
- Dollaway will fight Amir Sadollah in the second semifinal match.

Episode 11 – Coco is King

- The Coaches' Challenge is held between Griffin and Jackson. They play "Ultimate Fighter" Horse for $10,000.
- The winning coach's fighters were originally to win $1,000 each. White challenges Jackson to make a three-point shot to double the fighter's payouts. Jackson, who claims to be very bad at basketball, makes the three-point shot. As a result, the winning coach's fighters will each receive $2,000.
- Griffin, who played basketball in high school, shoots the ball "like Larry Bird in his prime," according to Gerald Harris. He wins the challenge, finishing with a one-handed slam dunk that Jackson says he will not even attempt.
- Later that night, the fighters engage in drinking again, and Taylor gets very drunk and deliberately urinates his pants inside of the house. Then he runs around the house and yells at everyone telling them what he just did. He then tries to hold himself underwater, partially drowning himself, in the hot tub because he does not want to get out.
- Semifinal matches will be three five-minute rounds, as opposed to two five-minute rounds (with a third tie breaker if needed) in the previous matches of the season.
- Jesse Taylor defeated Tim Credeur by unanimous decision (30–27, 30–26, 30–26) after three rounds.

Episode 12 – First Time Ever

- Amir Sadollah defeated C. B. Dollaway in the second semifinal bout by submission (armbar) at 2:50 in the third round.
- Following the taping of the show, Jesse Taylor and four other castmates stay in Las Vegas an extra night. White is given security footage from the Palace Station Casino showing Taylor kicking out a limousine window. White is also told that Taylor went into the hotel bar and "terrorized" women there. When approached by security, Taylor became belligerent and was yelling that he was a UFC fighter.
- White calls Griffin and Jackson to the training center to show them the video footage and explain the situation. Then Taylor is called in and told that he will be removed from the fight in the finale. White questions Taylor's maturity and worries about how he would act if he really were a UFC fighter. He advises Taylor to return home and get his life together.
- Dollaway and Credeur are flown back to Las Vegas and arrive back at the training center, where they are told about the situation with Taylor. They are invited to fight each other for the chance to replace Taylor in the finale to fight against Sadollah. They agree and are given three weeks to prepare.
- C. B. Dollaway defeated Tim Credeur by unanimous decision after three rounds.
- Both fighters are paid a bonus by White for their performance and Dollaway moves into the finals for a rematch against Sadollah.

== Tournament Bracket ==
Preliminary Round
Jesse Taylor	SUB
Mike Dolce	2
Dante Rivera	UD
Brandon Sene	3
Luke Zachrich	2
Dan Cramer	TKO
Tim Credeur	SUB
Matt Riddle	2
Amir Sadollah	TKO
Gerald Harris	2
Matt Brown	KO
Jeremy May	1
Nick Klein	2
C. B. Dollaway	SUB
Cale Yarbrough	MD
Patrick Schultz	2

Quarter-finals
Jesse Taylor	UD
Dante Rivera	2
Dan Cramer	1
Tim Credeur	SUB
Amir Sadollah	SUB
Matt Brown	2
C. B. Dollaway	TKO
Cale Yarbrough	1

Semi-finals
Jesse Taylor	UD
Tim Credeur	3
Amir Sadollah	SUB
C. B. Dollaway	3

Finale
C. B. Dollaway*	1
Amir Sadollah	SUB

* Taylor was involved in a series of situations after the taping of the show that resulted in his removal. Dollaway and Credeur were involved in an alternate bout weeks later with the winner replacing Taylor.

Legend
	Team Rampage
	Team Forrest
UD	Unanimous Decision
MD	Majority Decision
SUB	Submission
(T) KO	(Technical) Knockout

== The Ultimate Fighter 7 Finale ==
The Ultimate Fighter: Team Rampage vs. Team Forrest Finale
- The poster for The Ultimate Fighter: Team Rampage vs. Team Forrest Finale
- Promotion: Ultimate Fighting Championship
- Date: June 21, 2008
- Venue: Palms Casino Resort
- City: Las Vegas, Nevada
- Attendance: 2,500
- Total gate: $495,350

Event chronology
UFC 85: Bedlam	The Ultimate Fighter: Team Rampage vs. Team Forrest Finale	UFC 86: Jackson vs. Griffin

The Ultimate Fighter: Team Rampage vs. Team Forrest Finale (also known as The Ultimate Fighter 7 Finale) was a mixed martial arts event held by the Ultimate Fighting Championship (UFC) on June 21, 2008.

== Background ==
Featured were the finals from The Ultimate Fighter: Team Rampage vs. Team Forrest in the Middleweight division as well as a main event between Kendall Grove and Evan Tanner. This was Evan Tanner's final fight during his lifetime before his untimely death three months later.

A middleweight bout between Tim Credeur and Cale Yarbrough was canceled shortly before the event due to Credeur testing positive for Adderall which is a banned substance under the Nevada State Athletic Commission.

== Results ==
Main card (Spike TV)
Weight class				Method	Round	Time	Notes
Middleweight	Kendall Grove	def.	Evan Tanner	Decision (split) (28–29, 30–26, 30–26)	3	5:00
Middleweight	Amir Sadollah	def.	C. B. Dollaway	Submission (armbar)	1	3:02	(Note: The Ultimate Fighter 7 Middleweight tournament final)
Welterweight	Diego Sanchez	def.	Luigi Fioravanti	TKO (punches)	3	4:07
Lightweight	Spencer Fisher	def.	Jeremy Stephens	Decision (unanimous) (29–28, 29–28, 29–28)	3	5:00
Middleweight	Matt Riddle	def.	Dante Rivera	Decision (unanimous) (30–27, 30–27, 29–28)	3	5:00
Preliminary card
Welterweight	Dustin Hazelett	def.	Josh Burkman	Submission (armbar)	2	4:46
Middleweight	Drew McFedries	def.	Marvin Eastman	TKO (punches)	1	1:08	(Note: This bout was aired on the broadcast following the Sadollah vs Dollaway bout.)
Welterweight	Matt Brown	def.	Matt Arroyo	TKO (punches)	2	3:40
Middleweight	Dean Lister	def.	Jeremy Horn	Submission (guillotine choke)	1	3:52
Middleweight	Rob Kimmons	def.	Rob Yundt	Submission (guillotine choke)	1	3:58

=== Bonus awards ===
The following fighters received $20,000 bonuses.

- Fight of the Night: Dustin Hazelett vs. Josh Burkman
- Submission of the Night: Dustin Hazelett
- Knockout of the Night: Drew McFedries

== Coaches' Fight ==
UFC 86: Jackson vs. Griffin was held on July 4, 2008 in Paradise, Nevada.

- Light Heavyweight Championship bout: Quinton Jackson (c) vs. Forrest Griffin

Forrest Griffin defeated Quinton Jackson (c) via unanimous decision (48–46, 48–46, 49–46) after five rounds.

== See also ==
- The Ultimate Fighter
- List of current UFC fighters
- List of UFC events
- 2009 in UFC
