= Donald Cerrone =

American mixed martial artist (born 1983)

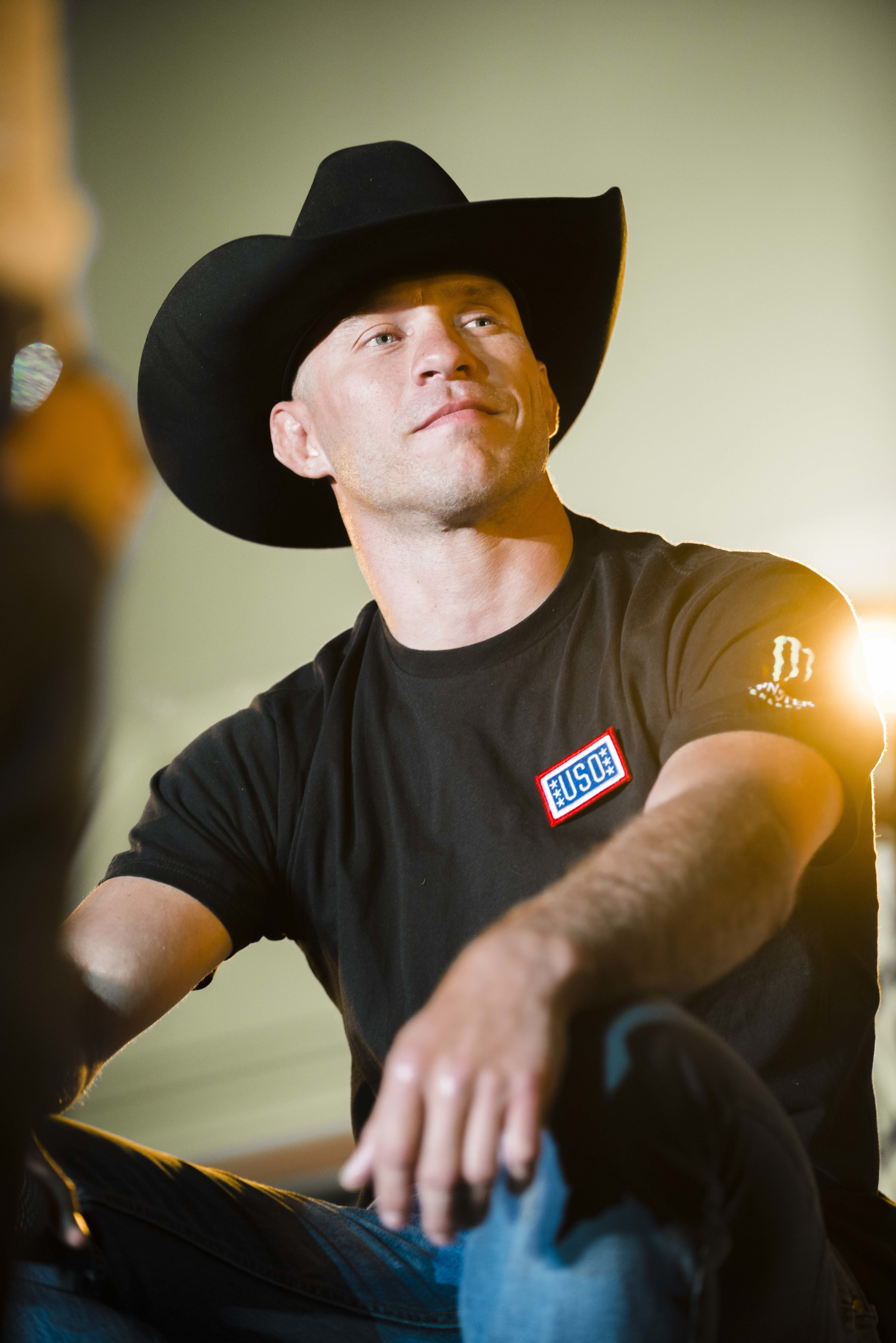
- Cerrone in 2016
- Born: Donald Anthony Cerrone; March 29, 1983 (age 43); Denver, Colorado, U.S.
- Nickname: Cowboy
- Height: 6 ft 0 in (183 cm)
- Weight: 170 lb (77 kg; 12 st 2 lb)
- Division: Lightweight (2006–2015, 2019); Welterweight (2016–2018, 2020–2022)
- Reach: 73 in (185 cm)
- Style: Kickboxing, Muay Thai
- Stance: Orthodox
- Fighting out of: Albuquerque, New Mexico, U.S.
- Team: Inyodo Martial Arts Club (2002–2006); Jackson Wink MMA Academy (2006–2018); BMF Ranch (2018–2022)
- Trainer: Greg Jackson (2006–2018); Joe Schilling (2018–2022)
- Rank: Black belt in Brazilian Jiu-Jitsu under Eliot Marshall
- Years active: 2003 (boxing); 2005–2022 (MMA)

Professional boxing record
- Total: 1
- Wins: 0
- Losses: 1
- By knockout: 1

Kickboxing record
- Total: 29
- Wins: 28
- By knockout: 19
- Losses: 0
- Draws: 1

Mixed martial arts record
- Total: 55
- Wins: 36
- By knockout: 10
- By submission: 17
- By decision: 9
- Losses: 17
- By knockout: 8
- By submission: 2
- By decision: 7
- No contests: 2

Other information
- Boxing record from BoxRec
- Mixed martial arts record from Sherdog

Donald Anthony Cerrone (born March 29, 1983), known professionally by his nickname "Cowboy", is an American former professional mixed martial artist, former kickboxer, and actor best known for competing in the Lightweight and Welterweight divisions of the Ultimate Fighting Championship (UFC), and the Lightweight division of the World Extreme Cagefighting (WEC).

He is known and respected by fans for his willingness to fight any time, having completed thirty eight fights in his eleven-year UFC tenure. Cerrone challenged for the WEC Lightweight Championship in 2009 and 2010, and the UFC Lightweight Championship in 2015. He was inducted into the UFC Hall of Fame in July 2023.

== Background ==
Donald Anthony Cerrone was born in Denver, Colorado. He is of Irish and Italian descent. At a young age, Cerrone was diagnosed with attention deficit disorder but never received treatment for it. Growing up he was considered a troubled child. He would eventually start street fighting and would often end up in jail overnight. When Cerrone was about sixteen, his parents became fed up with his behavior and sent him off to live with his paternal grandmother Jerry Cerrone, who took him in with open arms as Cerrone would later claim. She would sometimes bail him and his friends out of jail after they got into another fight and according to Cerrone himself that the next morning she would never bring up exactly what happened the night before, but instead just repeat the phrase "you know what you did" and leave it at that.

Cerrone attended Air Academy High School where he began professional bull riding, thus earning the nickname "Cowboy". At the age of twenty, through the advice of a friend, Cerrone began training in kickboxing and later Muay Thai. After winning a few kickboxing competitions and compiling a Muay Thai record of 28-0-1 (nineteen wins by TKO), he decided to pursue a career in mixed martial arts.

== Mixed martial arts career ==
Cerrone began training in mixed martial arts at Inyodo Martial Arts in Gypsum, Colorado. In 2006, he moved to Albuquerque, New Mexico and began training at Greg Jackson's Submission Fighting Gaidojutsu academy.

=== World Extreme Cagefighting ===
After compiling a record of 7–0, Cerrone was signed to fight in the WEC. His first fight in the promotion was against Kenneth Alexander. Originally a win via submission in 56 seconds of the first round, the decision was changed to a no-contest when Cerrone tested positive hydrochlorothiazide, a banned diuretic.

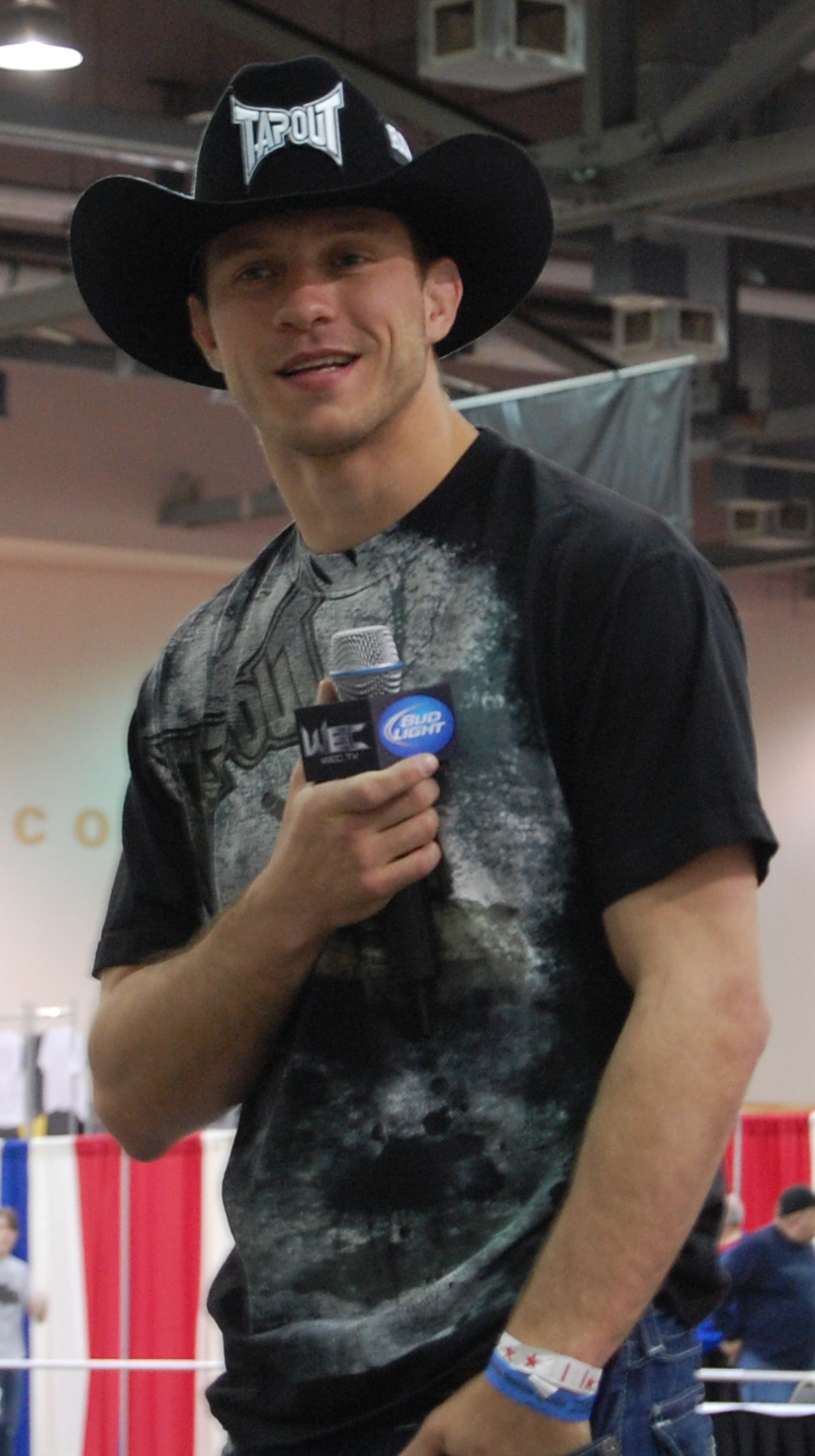
Cerrone in 2010

Cerrone was scheduled to face Rich Crunkilton at WEC 34, but Crunkilton was forced off the card with an injury and replaced by Danny Castillo. Cerrone won the bout via armbar in the first round.

Cerrone then faced Rob McCullough at WEC 36 on November 5, 2008. He won the bout via unanimous decision. The performance earned both fighters the Fight of the Night award.

On January 25, 2009, at WEC 38 he fought WEC Lightweight Champion, Jamie Varner, losing via technical split decision. The fight was highly competitive and won the Fight of the Night award. However, the fight was stopped prematurely in the fifth round when Cerrone hit Varner's temple with an illegal knee while Varner was still on the ground. Varner was given time to recover, but he was unable to continue, noting that he had double vision and had sustained a broken hand.

Cerrone was again scheduled to face Rich Crunkilton on June 7, 2009, at WEC 41, but Crunkilton was forced off the card with an injury and replaced by James Krause. Cerrone defeated Krause via first round submission.

Cerrone and Varner had agreed to a rematch, tentatively at WEC 43, but Varner was unable to receive medical clearance as a result from his hand injury. Cerrone fought Benson Henderson for the WEC Interim Lightweight Championship on October 10, 2009, at WEC 43 in San Antonio, Texas, losing by unanimous decision. Both fighters were awarded the Fight of the Night bonus award. Cerrone credited Henderson for being "a hell of a fighter" and conceded that he was slow to start the action, which may have cost him the match.

Cerrone faced Ed Ratcliff on December 19, 2009, in the event headliner at WEC 45. Cerrone defeated Ratcliff via third round submission. The bout also earned Cerrone Fight of the Night honors.

Cerrone fought Benson Henderson in a rematch of their 2009 Fight of the Year, this time for the WEC Lightweight Championship on April 24, 2010, at WEC 48. Cerrone lost via first-round guillotine choke submission.

Cerrone faced rival Jamie Varner in their highly anticipated rematch on September 30, 2010, at WEC 51. He won the fight via unanimous decision, winning all three rounds. In between rounds, there were often many shoves and obscenities exchanged by both fighters, including a shove at the very end of the match. In the post-fight interview, Cerrone declared he'd be willing to do a rematch in Arizona, Varner's home state, to settle their score once and for all. The bout won Fight of the Night honors.

Cerrone instead faced Chris Horodecki on December 16, 2010, at WEC 53. He won via submission in the second round with a triangle choke.

=== Ultimate Fighting Championship ===
In October 2010, World Extreme Cagefighting merged with the Ultimate Fighting Championship. As part of the merger, all WEC fighters were transferred to the UFC.

Cerrone faced Paul Kelly on February 5, 2011, at UFC 126, replacing an injured Sam Stout. He won the fight via submission due to a rear naked choke. For their performance, both fighters earned Fight of the Night honors.

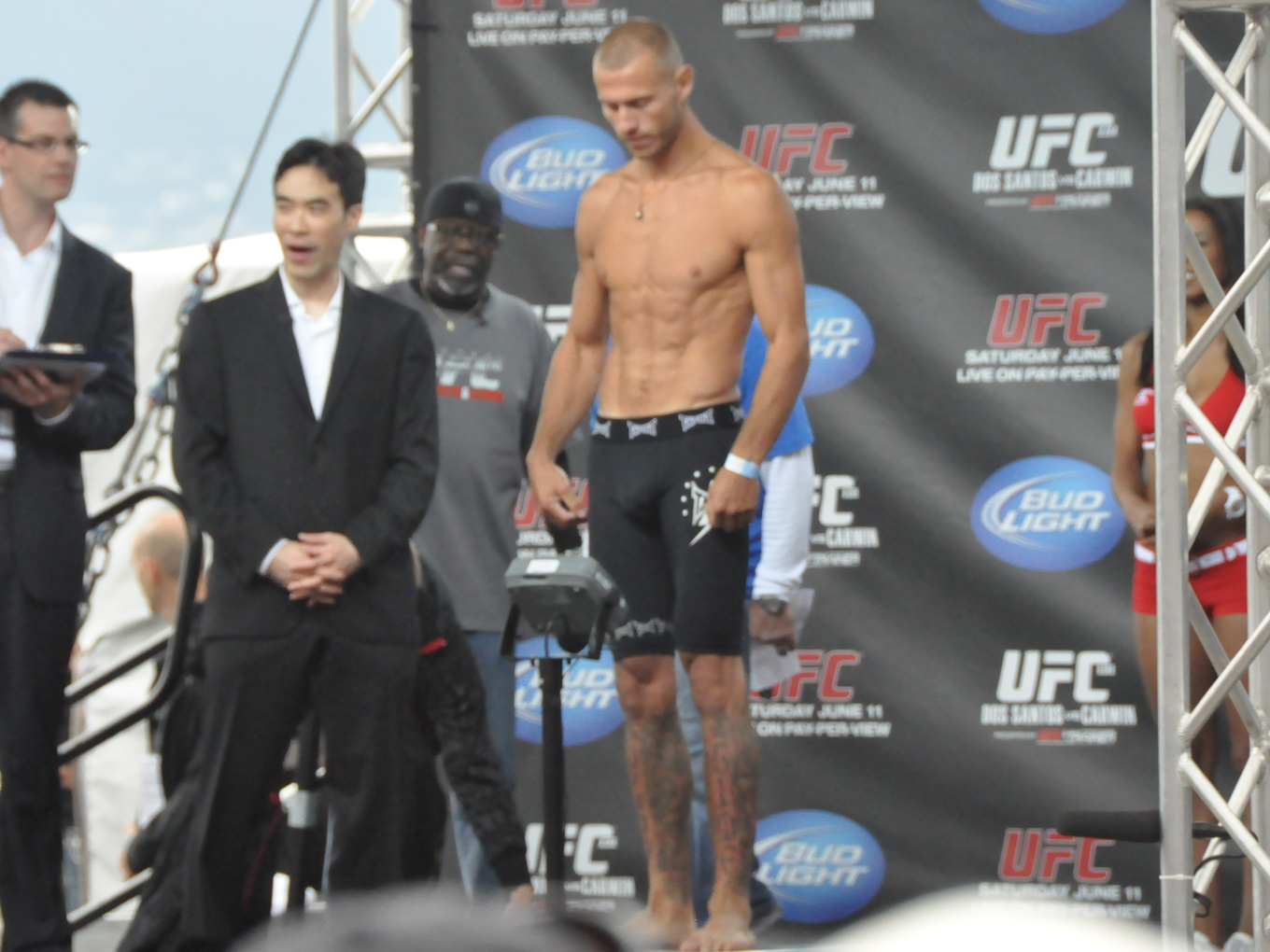
Cerrone at the weigh in for the UFC 131

Cerrone was expected to face Mac Danzig on June 11, 2011, at UFC 131. However, Danzig was forced out of the bout with a chest injury and replaced by promotional newcomer Vagner Rocha. Cerrone won the fight via unanimous decision.

Cerrone was expected to face Paul Taylor on August 14, 2011, at UFC on Versus 5, replacing an injured John Makdessi. However, Taylor was forced out of the bout with a foot injury and replaced by Charles Oliveira. Cerrone won the fight via TKO three minutes into the opening round, earning Knockout of Night honors for the performance.

Cerrone faced Dennis Siver on October 29, 2011, at UFC 137, replacing Sam Stout. Cerrone defeated Siver via first round submission, earning Submission of the Night honors.

Cerrone next faced Nate Diaz at UFC 141 on December 30, 2011. He lost the back-and-forth fight via unanimous decision, in a performance that earned both participants Fight of the Night honors. Despite knocking Diaz off of his feet multiple times with leg kicks, Cerrone could not offset the volume punches from Diaz, as Diaz landed 82% of the strikes he threw en route to his victory over Cerrone. On his loss to Diaz Cerrone stated, "You know instinct, I think that's the thing a lot of people aren't doing. That's where I made the mistake in my last fight, is, you need to learn to turn your brain off and just go by reactions. Don't go in there and try and think and do things and fight with your brain, because that's the thing, I got angry and tried to kill him, and when you try to go [too] hard you just can't do it."

Cerrone was expected to face Yves Edwards on May 15, 2012, at UFC on Fuel TV: The Korean Zombie vs. Poirier. However, Edwards was forced from the bout with an injury and replaced by Jeremy Stephens. Cerrone defeated Stephens by unanimous decision.

Cerrone fought Melvin Guillard on August 11, 2012, at UFC 150. He won the fight via knockout in the first round. The performance earned Cerrone Knockout of the Night and Fight of the Night honors.

Cerrone faced Anthony Pettis on January 26, 2013, at UFC on Fox 6. He lost the fight by TKO in the first round after Pettis finished him with a kick to the body. This marked the first time in his career that Cerrone lost via strikes.

Cerrone next faced Strikeforce veteran K. J. Noons on May 25, 2013, at UFC 160. He won the fight via unanimous decision.

Cerrone faced Rafael dos Anjos on August 28, 2013, at UFC Fight Night 27. Cerrone lost the fight by unanimous decision.

Cerrone faced Evan Dunham on November 16, 2013, at UFC 167. Cerrone won the fight via triangle choke in the second round. The win also earned him his second Submission of the Night bonus award.

Cerrone faced Adriano Martins on January 25, 2014, at UFC on Fox 10. He won the fight by knockout due to a headkick in the first round. The win also earned Cerrone his third Knockout of the Night bonus award.

Cerrone faced Edson Barboza on April 19, 2014, at UFC on Fox 11. Cerrone dropped his opponent with a strong jab in the first and quickly secured the rear-naked choke submission for the win. The win also earned Cerrone his first Performance of the Night bonus award.

Cerrone faced Jim Miller on July 16, 2014, at UFC Fight Night 45. Cerrone defeated Miller via knockout in the second round due to a head kick and punches, becoming the first man to give Miller a professional knockout loss. The win also earned Cerrone his second Performance of the Night bonus award.

Cerrone was briefly linked to a bout with Khabib Nurmagomedov on September 27, 2014, at UFC 178. However, the pairing was quickly scrapped after it was revealed that Nurmagomedov had suffered a knee injury that would sideline him indefinitely. Subsequently, Cerrone was matched with Bobby Green at the event. In turn, Cerrone eventually faced former Bellator Lightweight Champion and UFC newcomer Eddie Alvarez in the co-main event of the card. Cerrone won the fight via unanimous decision.

Cerrone faced Myles Jury on January 3, 2015, at UFC 182. Cerrone commented on his desire to fight him was due to his disdain over Jury's arrogant response after defeating Cerrone's former training partner, Diego Sanchez, in UFC 171. He won the fight by unanimous decision.

In an unprecedented move, Cerrone requested to face friend and WEC rival Benson Henderson just 15 days later at UFC Fight Night 59, replacing an injured Eddie Alvarez. Cerrone won the fight via a unanimous decision with all three judges scoring the fight 29–28. 12 of 14 media outlets scored the bout in favor of Henderson.

Cerrone was expected to face Khabib Nurmagomedov on May 23, 2015, at UFC 187. However, Nurmagomedov pulled out of the bout on April 30 due to a knee injury. He was replaced by John Makdessi. Cerrone won the fight via TKO in the second round.

After winning eight fights in a row in under two years, Cerrone earned his first UFC lightweight title shot. He faced Rafael dos Anjos in the main event at UFC on Fox 17 on December 19, 2015. Cerrone lost the fight via TKO just 66 seconds into the first round.

==== Moving up to welterweight ====
Cerrone was expected to face Tim Means in a welterweight bout on February 21, 2016, at UFC Fight Night 83. However, Means was removed from the bout on February 3 and was replaced by Alex Oliveira. Cerrone won the fight via submission in the first round. He was also awarded a Performance of the Night bonus.

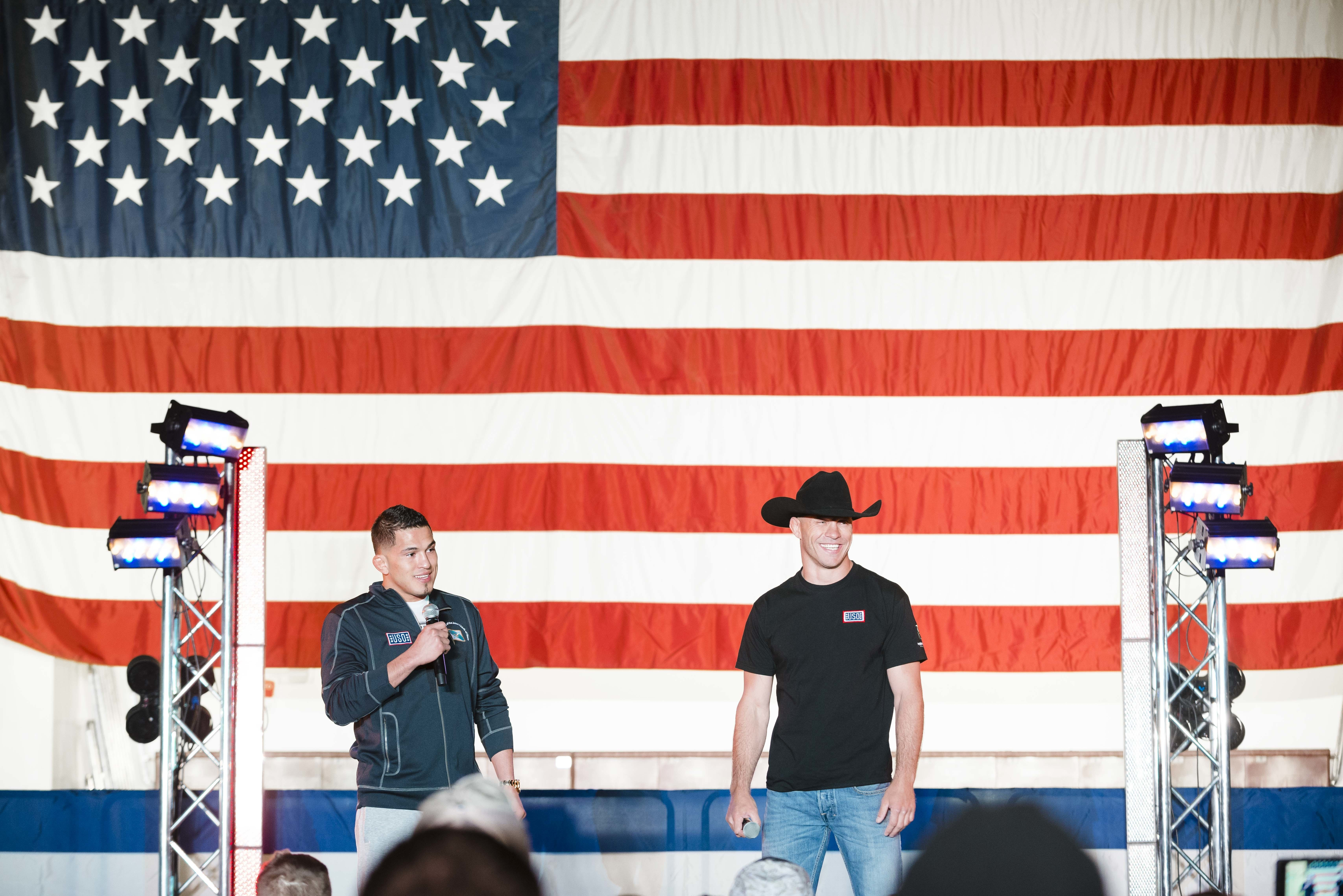
Cerrone (right) on stage with Anthony Pettis for a USO tour

Cerrone next faced Patrick Côté on June 18, 2016, at UFC Fight Night 89. He won the fight via TKO in the third round and earned himself another Performance of the Night bonus.

Cerrone next faced Rick Story on August 20, 2016, at UFC 202. Cerrone won the fight via TKO in the second round and was awarded a Performance of the Night bonus.

On August 26, 2016, it was announced that Cerrone had signed a new, eight-fight contract with UFC.

Cerrone was briefly linked to a bout with Robbie Lawler on November 12, 2016, at UFC 205. However, Lawler turned down the fight and Cerrone was then scheduled to face Kelvin Gastelum on the card. However, on the day of the weigh-ins, Gastelum did not make an attempt to formally weigh in as he was well over the 171 lbs limit for the fight and the bout was scrapped. Consequently, Cerrone was quickly rescheduled and faced Matt Brown the following month at UFC 206. Cerrone won the fight via knockout in the third round.

Cerrone faced Jorge Masvidal on January 28, 2017, in the co-main event at UFC on Fox 23. He lost the fight via TKO in the second round.

Cerrone was expected to face Robbie Lawler on July 8, 2017, at UFC 213. On June 28, reports began to circulate that Cerrone had sustained a minor injury which would force the fight to be postponed to UFC 214 taking place three weeks later. UFC President Dana White confirmed later the same day that Cerrone in fact had a staph infection and a pulled groin, and the plan is to reschedule the pairing to after UFC 214. However, the bout eventually took place at UFC 214. Cerrone lost the back-and-forth fight by a very close unanimous decision that many feel that Cerrone should have indeed won.

Cerrone faced Darren Till on October 21, 2017, in the main event at UFC Fight Night: Cowboy vs. Till. He lost the fight via TKO in the first round.

Cerrone faced Yancy Medeiros on February 18, 2018, at UFC Fight Night: Cowboy vs. Medeiros. He won the fight via technical knockout in round one. With this win, Cerrone tied the UFC records for most finishes in the promotion with fourteen and most wins in the promotion with twenty.

On June 23, 2018, Cerrone faced Leon Edwards at UFC Fight Night 132. He lost the fight via unanimous decision.

In the beginning of August 2018, it was revealed that he had parted ways with his long-time striking coach Brandon Gibson after the loss against Edwards. Appearing on Joe Rogan Experience on August 29, 2018, Cerrone launched on a tirade against his training camp Jackson-Wink and announced that he had parted ways with the team altogether.

Cerrone faced Mike Perry on November 10, 2018, at UFC Fight Night 139. He won the fight by submission due to an armbar in the first round, becoming the first fighter to finish Perry in MMA. His fight earned him the Performance of the Night award. With this win, Cerrone set the UFC records for most finishes in the promotion with fifteen and most wins in the promotion with twenty one (21).

==== Return to Lightweight ====
Cerrone faced Alexander Hernandez in a lightweight bout on January 19, 2019, at UFC Fight Night 143. He was successful in his return to Lightweight, winning the fight via TKO in the second round, after outstriking and outwrestling Hernandez throughout the fight. With this win, Cerrone extended his UFC records for most finishes with sixteen (and most wins with twenty-two). He also added another record to his legacy, becoming the fighter with the most fight bonuses at sixteen.

Cerrone faced Al Iaquinta on May 4, 2019, at UFC Fight Night: Iaquinta vs. Cowboy. He won the fight via unanimous decision. This fight earned him the Fight of the Night bonus award.

In a quick turnaround, Cerrone returned to the Octagon just 32 days after his last win and faced Tony Ferguson on June 8, 2019, at UFC 238. Cerrone lost the fight via technical knockout in between the second and third rounds after an attempt to blow his nose caused his eye to swell shut, rendering him unable to continue. This fight earned him the Fight of the Night award.

Cerrone faced Justin Gaethje on September 14, 2019, at UFC Fight Night 158. He lost the fight via knockout in round one.

=== Return to welterweight ===
As the first fight of his new six-fight contract, Cerrone headlined UFC 246 when he faced Conor McGregor on January 18, 2020, in a welterweight bout. He lost the fight via technical knockout in the first round.

Cerrone faced Anthony Pettis in a rematch on May 9, 2020, at UFC 249. He lost the fight by unanimous decision although some consider it controversial.

Cerrone faced Niko Price on September 19, 2020, at UFC Fight Night 178. Price was docked a point in round one for repeated eye pokes, and the fight would be declared a majority draw. However, it was later overturned to a no contest (NC) after Price tested positive for marijuana.

Cerrone was scheduled to face Diego Sanchez on May 8, 2021, at UFC on ESPN 24. However, Sanchez was removed from the fight on April 28 for undisclosed reasons and he was replaced by Alex Morono. He lost the fight via technical knockout in round one.

Cerrone was scheduled to face Joe Lauzon in a lightweight bout on April 30, 2022, at UFC Fight Night 208. The bout was moved to May 7, 2022, at UFC 274 for undisclosed reasons. Despite both competitors weighing in, the bout was canceled the day of the event due to Cerrone falling ill. The pair was rescheduled to meet at UFC on ESPN 37 on June 18, 2022. The bout was yet again scrapped the day of this event due to Lauzon suffering from leg cramping.

Cerrone, as a replacement for Bobby Green, faced Jim Miller on July 2, 2022, at UFC 276. He lost the fight via guillotine choke submission in the second round and subsequently announced his retirement during the post-fight interview.

== Professional grappling career ==
Cerrone competed against Rafael dos Anjos in the main event of Submission Underground 19 on December 20, 2022. The match went to EBI overtime and Cerrone won by armbar at 20 seconds of the first round.

On December 19, 2021, Cerrone competed in his first professional grappling match against Craig Jones under the Combat Jiu-Jitsu ruleset at the Featherweight edition of the CJJ World Championships. He tapped out after being put in a rear-naked choke by Jones a little over halfway into the regulation period.

On December 30, 2021, Cerrone competed in a grappling match against Joe Solecki at Fury Pro Grappling 3. Solecki submitted Cerrone with a rear-naked choke at 3:17 of their match.

== Freestyle wrestling ==
Cerrone was scheduled to make his Real American Freestyle debut against Anthony Pettis on November 28, 2026 at RAF 15. However, Cerrone withdrew for undisclosed reasons and was replaced by Arman Tsarukyan.

== Acting career ==
Cerrone has had small roles in film and television since 2017, including appearing in the 2020 Netflix film Spenser Confidential.

He acted in a starring role, opposite Gina Carano, in the 2022 Daily Wire film Terror on the Prairie.

== Personal life ==
Cerrone and his wife Lindsay have three sons.

Cerrone is good friends with It's Always Sunny in Philadelphia creator Rob McElhenney, who has trained at BMF Ranch, and Cerrone made an appearance alongside Paul Felder, Megan Olivi and Dana White in the season 12 episode "Wolf Cola: A Public Relations Nightmare."

== BMF Ranch ==
In 2014, Cerrone established an MMA gym at his property in Edgewood, New Mexico to lower his training camp costs by hosting his training partners at the estate. Coaches like Brandon Gibson, Jafari Vanier, and Jonavin Webb are usually situated at the ranch with fighters like Lando Vannata, John Dodson and Leonard Garcia.

== Controversies ==
=== Racism accusations ===
In 2014, the UFC lightweight fighter Bobby Green accused Cerrone of making racist comments towards him and about black people, in a since deleted interview with journalist Ariel Helwani. Cerrone dismissed his claims, maintaining that if he were racist, he wouldn't "have three black guys living with [him]".

Former UFC bantamweight champion Aljamain Sterling came forward with similar allegations in 2016, detailing an altercation between him and Cerrone during UFC International Fight Week. According to Sterling, after Cerrone made a comment about his gold chain that made him feel "uncomfortable", he then used an "inappropriate word" in front of Sterling. While Sterling never specified what the word was, he strongly implied it had racial overtones. When he asked for an explanation, Cerrone allegedly started to threaten him, telling him that he'd "beat the fuck out of him" and "do what Caraway did to him", referring to Sterling's UFC bout earlier that year in which he suffered his first professional loss to Bryan Caraway.

Cerrone has been criticized for his casual online usage of the racial slur "nigga", including in a 2016 exchange on Instagram with his sparring partner Said Nurmagomedov, in which each one referred to the other as "my nigga".

=== Allegations of sexual harassment ===
In an interview with Ariel Helwani, the UFC fighter Bobby Green accused Cerrone of sexually harassing his female fans at UFC Fan Expo signing in 2014. According to Green, he groped and behaved inappropriately towards the women that came to take a photo with him.

"He's groping these women. They've got husbands, they've got fiancees, they've got boyfriends, I'm like, that's messed up man, just because this guy's a nerd and he can't do anything to you, you're going to do this to him. Girlfriend's cute, Donald Cerrone, picks her up, grabs her ass, starts grabbing on there and stuff and he's like 'I'm Donald Cerrone.' I'm like, 'you're going to piss somebody off, you get the wrong person they're going to get pissed.' He's like, 'what are they going to do to me, I'll knock them out.' "

— Bobby Green

In an interview with Sherdog, Cerrone denied these accusations. "That was two years ago, ya' know? Why didn't any of this come out? Why didn't a fan file a lawsuit or say, 'Yo, Cowboy is groping my wife,' c'mon." he said of the alleged incidents.

=== Homophobic and transphobic comments ===
As part of his trash talk to describe Jamie Varner in a build up of their second fight at WEC 51 in 2010, Cerrone commented that Varner is "a fag" and that he hoped to kill him in the ring. After WEC officials publicly condemned his remarks, he apologized for the death threats on Twitter, but did not mention the slur usage in his apology.

Cerrone was widely criticized for his use of a homophobic slur to describe Daniel Cormier's performance against Anderson Silva at UFC 200 during a Q&A at UFC Fan Expo, where he was taking part in a panel covering the event along with CM Punk and Joe Gooden. When talking with CM Punk about the worst performances of that night, he criticized Cormier's wrestling-heavy game plan asking "How you going to give up weight and fight like a fag, man?".

After an immediate backlash, a UFC senior official told the MMA Junkie portal that the organization was "incredibly disappointed by Cerrone's comments" and will be meeting with him to discuss the severity of the situation. Cerrone reacted to the criticism with a since-deleted Instagram post, which showed a photo of him wearing a then-recently released UFC rainbow T-shirt in support of the LGBTQ community and in which he apologized for his choice of words.

While Jason Ellis was interviewing Cerrone on his radio show, Ellis mentioned he is bisexual and has had sexual relationships with men, which appeared to make Cerrone uncomfortable. During his appearance on an episode of The Joe Rogan Experience podcast some weeks later, Cerrone called Ellis "a faggot", adding that he had not wanted to say it to Ellis directly. Ellis voiced his disappointment with Cerrone's statements in an interview with outsports.com.

When discussing U.S. president Donald Trump's attempts to ban transgender people from serving in the US armed forces on an episode of The Fighter and the Kid podcast, Cerrone objected to the host, Brendan Schaub, using female pronouns to describe a trans woman, and stated: "I'm just saying, if you got a dick, you're a dude."

=== Hoelzer Reich sponsorship ===
Until 2009, Cerrone was one of a number of MMA fighters sponsored by Hoelzer Reich, a t-shirt company that includes symbols such as the Iron Cross on its t-shirts, which detractors have stated is Nazi imagery. The brand was banned by the UFC in 2009.

== Championships and accomplishments ==
=== Kickboxing ===
- Dominion Warrior Inc
  - Dominion Warrior Muay Thai World Lightweight (-73.4 kg/162 lb) Championship (One time)
- International Sport Karate Association
  - ISKA Amateur Colorado State Middleweight (-75 kg/165 lb) Oriental Championship (One time)
- Kickdown Classic
  - KDC Amateur Welterweight Championship (One time)
- S-1
  - 2006 S-1 Muay Thai U.S. Lightweight (-73.4 kg/162 lb) Tournament Championship 270

=== Mixed martial arts ===
- Ultimate Fighting Championship
  - UFC Hall of Fame (Modern wing, Class of 2023)
  - Fight of the Night (Six times) vs. Paul Kelly, Nate Diaz, Melvin Guillard, Alexander Hernandez, Al Iaquinta & Tony Ferguson
    - Tied (Justin Gaethje) for second most Fight of the Night bonuses in UFC/WEC history (11) (behind Cub Swanson)
  - Knockout of the Night (Three times) vs. Charles Oliveira, Melvin Guillard, & Adriano Martins
  - Submission of the Night (Two times) vs. Dennis Siver & Evan Dunham
  - Performance of the Night (Seven times) vs. Edson Barboza, Jim Miller, Alex Oliveira, Patrick Côté, Rick Story, Mike Perry, & Alexander Hernandez
    - Most Post-Fight bonuses in UFC/WEC combined history (23)
    - Second most Post-Fight bonus awards in UFC history (18)
    - Tied (Conor McGregor, Ovince Saint Preux, Tom Aspinall, Carlos Prates & Song Yadong) for fourth most Performance of the Night bonuses in UFC history (7)
    - Fifth most Post-Fight bonuses in UFC Lightweight division history (14)
  - Tied (Andrei Arlovski) for fifth most wins in UFC history (23)
    - Tied (Beneil Dariush) for third most wins in UFC Lightweight division history (17)
    - Most wins in Zuffa, LLC (UFC, Pride, WEC, Strikeforce) history (29)
  - Tied (Neil Magny) for third most bouts in UFC history (38)
    - Tied (Jim Miller) for Most bouts in Zuffa, LLC (UFC, Pride, WEC, Strikeforce) history (48)
  - Tied (Derrick Lewis) for third most finishes in UFC history (16)
    - Tied (Tony Ferguson, Islam Makhachev & Dustin Poirier) for fifth most finishes in UFC Lightweight division history (10)
    - Tied (Wanderlei Silva & Jim Miller) for third most finishes in Zuffa, LLC (UFC, Pride, WEC, Strikeforce) history (20) (behind Mirko Cro Cop & Charles Oliveira)
    - Tied (Michał Oleksiejczuk, Francis Ngannou, Joe Lauzon and Terrance McKinney) for sixth most first-round finishes in UFC history (8)
  - Most knockdowns in UFC history (20)
    - Tied (Dustin Poirier) for third most knockdowns landed in UFC Lightweight division history (11)
  - Most head kick knockouts in UFC and Zuffa, LLC history (6)
    - Second most knockdowns in Zuffa, LLC (UFC, Pride, WEC, Strikeforce) history (25)
  - UFC.com Awards
    - 2011: Ranked No. 4 Import of the Year, Ranked No. 9 Fighter of the Year & Ranked No. 6 Fight of the Year vs. Nate Diaz
    - 2012: Ranked No. 7 Knockout of the Year vs. Melvin Guillard
    - 2014: Ranked No. 4 Fighter of the Year
    - 2016: Ranked No. 9 Fighter of the Year, Ranked No. 8 Fight of the Year & Ranked No. 6 Knockout of the Year vs. Matt Brown
    - 2018: Ranked No. 10 Submission of the Year vs. Mike Perry
    - 2019: Ranked No. 9 Fight of the Year vs. Tony Ferguson
- World Extreme Cagefighting
  - Fight of the Night (Five times) vs. Rob McCullough, Jamie Varner (2), Benson Henderson, & Ed Ratcliff
  - Most Fight of the Night awards in WEC history (5)
- Ring of Fire
  - Ring of Fire Lightweight Champion (one time; former)
- ESPN
  - 2018 Submission of the Year vs. Mike Perry at UFC Fight Night: The Korean Zombie vs. Rodríguez
- MMA Fighting
  - 2009 Fight of the Year vs. Benson Henderson on October 10
- MMA Junkie
  - 2014 #2 Ranked Fighter of the Year
  - 2014 January Knockout of the Month vs. Adriano Martins
  - 2014 July Knockout of the Month vs. Jim Miller
  - 2016 #5 Ranked Fighter of the Year
  - 2016 February Submission of the Month vs. Alex Oliveira
  - 2018 November Submission of the Month vs. Mike Perry
- Sherdog
  - 2009 Fight of the Year vs. Benson Henderson on October 10
  - 2008 Round of the Year vs. Rob McCullough on November 5; Round 1
- Sports Illustrated
  - 2009 Fight of the Year vs. Benson Henderson on October 10
- World MMA Awards
  - 2011 Breakthrough Fighter of the Year
- CBS Sports
  - 2016 #2 Ranked UFC Fighter of the Year
- MMA HQ
  - 2008 Fight of the Year vs. Rob McCullough at WEC 36
- Bleacher Report
  - 2014 #3 Ranked Fighter of the Year

== Mixed martial arts record ==
Professional record breakdown
55 matches	36 wins	17 losses
By knockout	10	8
By submission	17	2
By decision	9	7
No contests	2	

Res.	Record	Opponent	Method	Event	Date	Round	Time	Location	Notes
Loss	36–17 (2)	Jim Miller	Submission (guillotine choke)	UFC 276	July 2, 2022	2	1:32	Las Vegas, Nevada, United States	
Loss	36–16 (2)	Alex Morono	TKO (punches)	UFC on ESPN: Rodriguez vs. Waterson	May 8, 2021	1	4:40	Las Vegas, Nevada, United States	
NC	36–15 (2)	Niko Price	NC (overturned)	UFC Fight Night: Covington vs. Woodley	September 19, 2020	3	5:00	Las Vegas, Nevada, United States	Price was deducted one point in round 1 due to repeated eye pokes. Originally a majority draw; overturned after Price tested positive for marijuana.
Loss	36–15 (1)	Anthony Pettis	Decision (unanimous)	UFC 249	May 9, 2020	3	5:00	Jacksonville, Florida, United States	
Loss	36–14 (1)	Conor McGregor	TKO (head kick and punches)	UFC 246	January 18, 2020	1	0:40	Las Vegas, Nevada, United States	Return to Welterweight.
Loss	36–13 (1)	Justin Gaethje	TKO (punches)	UFC Fight Night: Cowboy vs. Gaethje	September 14, 2019	1	4:18	Vancouver, British Columbia, Canada	
Loss	36–12 (1)	Tony Ferguson	TKO (doctor stoppage)	UFC 238	June 8, 2019	2	5:00	Chicago, Illinois, United States	Fight of the Night.
Win	36–11 (1)	Al Iaquinta	Decision (unanimous)	UFC Fight Night: Iaquinta vs. Cowboy	May 4, 2019	5	5:00	Ottawa, Ontario, Canada	Fight of the Night.
Win	35–11 (1)	Alexander Hernandez	TKO (head kick and punches)	UFC Fight Night: Cejudo vs. Dillashaw	January 19, 2019	2	3:43	Brooklyn, New York, United States	Return to Lightweight. Performance of the Night. Fight of the Night.
Win	34–11 (1)	Mike Perry	Submission (armbar)	UFC Fight Night: The Korean Zombie vs. Rodríguez	November 10, 2018	1	4:46	Denver, Colorado, United States	Performance of the Night.
Loss	33–11 (1)	Leon Edwards	Decision (unanimous)	UFC Fight Night: Cowboy vs. Edwards	June 23, 2018	5	5:00	Kallang, Singapore	
Win	33–10 (1)	Yancy Medeiros	TKO (punches)	UFC Fight Night: Cowboy vs. Medeiros	February 18, 2018	1	4:58	Austin, Texas, United States	
Loss	32–10 (1)	Darren Till	TKO (punches)	UFC Fight Night: Cowboy vs. Till	October 21, 2017	1	4:20	Gdańsk, Poland	
Loss	32–9 (1)	Robbie Lawler	Decision (unanimous)	UFC 214	July 29, 2017	3	5:00	Anaheim, California, United States	
Loss	32–8 (1)	Jorge Masvidal	TKO (punches)	UFC on Fox: Shevchenko vs. Peña	January 28, 2017	2	1:00	Denver, Colorado, United States	
Win	32–7 (1)	Matt Brown	KO (head kick)	UFC 206	December 10, 2016	3	0:44	Toronto, Ontario, Canada	
Win	31–7 (1)	Rick Story	TKO (knee and punches)	UFC 202	August 20, 2016	2	2:02	Las Vegas, Nevada, United States	Performance of the Night.
Win	30–7 (1)	Patrick Côté	TKO (punches)	UFC Fight Night: MacDonald vs. Thompson	June 18, 2016	3	2:35	Ottawa, Ontario, Canada	Performance of the Night.
Win	29–7 (1)	Alex Oliveira	Submission (triangle choke)	UFC Fight Night: Cowboy vs. Cowboy	February 21, 2016	1	2:33	Pittsburgh, Pennsylvania, United States	Welterweight debut. Performance of the Night.
Loss	28–7 (1)	Rafael dos Anjos	TKO (punches)	UFC on Fox: dos Anjos vs. Cowboy 2	December 19, 2015	1	1:06	Orlando, Florida, United States	For the UFC Lightweight Championship.
Win	28–6 (1)	John Makdessi	TKO (head kick)	UFC 187	May 23, 2015	2	4:44	Las Vegas, Nevada, United States	
Win	27–6 (1)	Benson Henderson	Decision (unanimous)	UFC Fight Night: McGregor vs. Siver	January 18, 2015	3	5:00	Boston, Massachusetts, United States	
Win	26–6 (1)	Myles Jury	Decision (unanimous)	UFC 182	January 3, 2015	3	5:00	Las Vegas, Nevada, United States	
Win	25–6 (1)	Eddie Alvarez	Decision (unanimous)	UFC 178	September 27, 2014	3	5:00	Las Vegas, Nevada, United States	
Win	24–6 (1)	Jim Miller	KO (head kick and punches)	UFC Fight Night: Cowboy vs. Miller	July 16, 2014	2	3:31	Atlantic City, New Jersey, United States	Performance of the Night.
Win	23–6 (1)	Edson Barboza	Submission (rear-naked choke)	UFC on Fox: Werdum vs. Browne	April 19, 2014	1	3:15	Orlando, Florida, United States	Performance of the Night.
Win	22–6 (1)	Adriano Martins	KO (head kick)	UFC on Fox: Henderson vs. Thomson	January 25, 2014	1	4:40	Chicago, Illinois, United States	Knockout of the Night.
Win	21–6 (1)	Evan Dunham	Submission (triangle choke)	UFC 167	November 16, 2013	2	3:49	Las Vegas, Nevada, United States	Submission of the Night.
Loss	20–6 (1)	Rafael dos Anjos	Decision (unanimous)	UFC Fight Night: Condit vs. Kampmann 2	August 28, 2013	3	5:00	Indianapolis, Indiana, United States	
Win	20–5 (1)	K.J. Noons	Decision (unanimous)	UFC 160	May 25, 2013	3	5:00	Las Vegas, Nevada, United States	
Loss	19–5 (1)	Anthony Pettis	KO (kick to the body)	UFC on Fox: Johnson vs. Dodson	January 26, 2013	1	2:35	Chicago, Illinois, United States	
Win	19–4 (1)	Melvin Guillard	KO (head kick and punch)	UFC 150	August 11, 2012	1	1:16	Denver, Colorado, United States	Catchweight (157.5 lb) bout; Guillard missed weight. Knockout of the Night. Fight of the Night.
Win	18–4 (1)	Jeremy Stephens	Decision (unanimous)	UFC on Fuel TV: The Korean Zombie vs. Poirier	May 15, 2012	3	5:00	Fairfax, Virginia, United States	
Loss	17–4 (1)	Nate Diaz	Decision (unanimous)	UFC 141	December 30, 2011	3	5:00	Las Vegas, Nevada, United States	Fight of the Night.
Win	17–3 (1)	Dennis Siver	Submission (rear-naked choke)	UFC 137	October 29, 2011	1	2:22	Las Vegas, Nevada, United States	Submission of the Night.
Win	16–3 (1)	Charles Oliveira	TKO (punches)	UFC Live: Hardy vs. Lytle	August 14, 2011	1	3:01	Milwaukee, Wisconsin, United States	Knockout of the Night.
Win	15–3 (1)	Vagner Rocha	Decision (unanimous)	UFC 131	June 11, 2011	3	5:00	Vancouver, British Columbia, Canada	
Win	14–3 (1)	Paul Kelly	Submission (rear-naked choke)	UFC 126	February 5, 2011	2	3:48	Las Vegas, Nevada, United States	Fight of the Night.
Win	13–3 (1)	Chris Horodecki	Submission (triangle choke)	WEC 53	December 16, 2010	2	2:43	Glendale, Arizona, United States	
Win	12–3 (1)	Jamie Varner	Decision (unanimous)	WEC 51	September 30, 2010	3	5:00	Broomfield, Colorado, United States	Fight of the Night.
Loss	11–3 (1)	Benson Henderson	Submission (guillotine choke)	WEC 48	April 24, 2010	1	1:57	Sacramento, California, United States	For the WEC Lightweight Championship.
Win	11–2 (1)	Ed Ratcliff	Submission (rear-naked choke)	WEC 45	December 19, 2009	3	3:47	Las Vegas, Nevada, United States	Fight of the Night.
Loss	10–2 (1)	Benson Henderson	Decision (unanimous)	WEC 43	October 10, 2009	5	5:00	San Antonio, Texas, United States	For the interim WEC Lightweight Championship. Fight of the Night.
Win	10–1 (1)	James Krause	Submission (rear-naked choke)	WEC 41	June 7, 2009	1	4:38	Sacramento, California, United States	
Loss	9–1 (1)	Jamie Varner	Technical Decision (split)	WEC 38	January 25, 2009	5	3:10	San Diego, California, United States	For the WEC Lightweight Championship. Fight of the Night.
Win	9–0 (1)	Rob McCullough	Decision (unanimous)	WEC 36	November 5, 2008	3	5:00	Hollywood, Florida, United States	WEC Lightweight title eliminator. Fight of the Night.
Win	8–0 (1)	Danny Castillo	Submission (armbar)	WEC 34	June 1, 2008	1	1:30	Sacramento, California, United States	
NC	7–0 (1)	Kenneth Alexander	NC (overturned by NSAC)	WEC 30	September 5, 2007	1	0:56	Las Vegas, Nevada, United States	Originally a submission (triangle choke) win for Cerrone; overturned after he tested positive for banned substances.
Win	7–0	Yasunori Kanehara	Submission (triangle choke)	Greatest Common Multiple: Cage Force 3	June 9, 2007	2	2:46	Tokyo, Japan	
Win	6–0	Anthony Njokuani	Submission (triangle choke)	Ring of Fire 29	April 28, 2007	1	4:30	Broomfield, Colorado, United States	
Win	5–0	Ryan Roberts	Submission (armbar)	Ring of Fire 28	February 16, 2007	1	1:49	Broomfield, Colorado, United States	
Win	4–0	Jesse Brock	Submission (triangle choke)	Ring of Fire 26	September 9, 2006	1	1:35	Castle Rock, Colorado, United States	Won the ROF Lightweight Championship.
Win	3–0	Craig Tennant	Submission (armbar)	Ring of Fire 24	June 17, 2006	1	1:26	Castle Rock, Colorado, United States	
Win	2–0	Cruz Chacon	Submission (triangle choke)	American CF: Genesis	February 24, 2006	2	2:25	Denver, Colorado, United States	
Win	1–0	Nate Mohr	Submission (triangle choke)	Ring of Fire 21	February 11, 2006	1	1:42	Castle Rock, Colorado, United States	Lightweight debut.

== Pay-per-view bouts ==
No.	Event	Fight	Date	Venue	City	PPV Buys
1.	UFC 246	McGregor vs. Cowboy	January 18, 2020	T-Mobile Arena	Las Vegas, Nevada, U.S.	1,350,000

== Muay Thai record (partial) ==
28 Wins (19 (T)KO's), 0 Losses 1 Draw
Date	Result	Opponent	Event	Location	Method	Round	Time
2006-08-05	Win	(United States) Travis Crawford	Dominion Warrior/S-1: United States Championships, Final	Miami, Florida, U.S.	TKO (right hook)	3	2:21
Wins the 2006 S-1 Muay Thai U.S. Lightweight (-73.4 kg/162 lb) Tournament Championship and the Dominion Warrior Muay Thai World Lightweight (-73.4 kg/162 lb) Championship.
2006-08-05	Win	(Canada) Jan Kaszuba	Dominion Warrior/S-1: United States Championships, Semi Finals	Miami, Florida, U.S.	Decision (split)	3	3:00
2005-12-10	Win	(United States) Lamont Forin	Ring of Fire 20: Elite	Castle Rock, Colorado, U.S.	Decision (unanimous)	3	3:00
2005-10-21	Draw	(United States) Raul Rodriguez	Strikeforce	San Jose, California, U.S.	Technical draw	N/A	N/A
2005-06-18	Win	(United States) Clint Rhodes	Ring of Fire 17: Unstoppable	Castle Rock, Colorado, U.S.	TKO (strikes)	NA	N/A
2005-02-12	Win	(United States) Mike Justice	Ring of Fire 15: Inferno	Castle Rock, Colorado, U.S.	Decision (unanimous)	3	3:00
Legend: Win Loss Draw/No contest Notes

== Professional boxing record ==
1 fight	0 wins	1 loss
By knockout	0	1

No.	Result	Record	Opponent	Method	Round, time	Date	Location	Notes
1	Loss	0–1	(United States) Geoffrey Spruiell	TKO	2 (4), 2:39	November 21, 2003	(United States) Los Caporales Regency Hotel, Denver, Colorado, U.S.	

== Filmography ==
=== Film ===
Year	Title	Role	Notes
2018	The Equalizer 2	Belgian Backpacker	
2020	Spenser Confidential	Big Boy (as Cowboy Cerrone)	
2020	Puppy Love	Danny	
2020	Embattled	Autograph Jack	
2021	The Outlaw Johnny Black	Crackshot Bob	
2021	The Harder They Fall	Coward at Bank	
2022	The Commando	Ray	
2022	Terror on the Prairie	Jebediah McAllister	
2024	Lights Out	Carter	
2025	Prisoner of War	Captain Collins	Direct-to-video

=== Television ===
Year	Title	Role	Notes
2017	It's Always Sunny in Philadelphia	Donald Cerrone	Episode: "Wolf Cola: A Public Relations Nightmare"
2017	Godless	Gang Member	7 episodes
2017	The Night Shift	Wounded Paramedic Nick	Episode: "Resurgence"
2020	Magnum P.I.	Reese	Episode: "A Leopard on the Prowl"
2022	The Terminal List	Tomahawk Guard	Episode: "Reclamation"
2024	Cobra Kai	Cage Fighter	Episode: "Blood In Blood Out"
2025	Mythic Quest	Himself	Episode: "Rebrand"

== See also ==
- List of male mixed martial artists
