= Ian Loveland =

American martial artist

- Born: September 7, 1983 (age 43); Gresham, Oregon, United States
- Other names: The Barn Owl
- Height: 5 ft 8 in (1.73 m)
- Weight: 135 lb (61 kg; 9.6 st)
- Division: Featherweight, Bantamweight
- Reach: 70 in (178 cm)
- Fighting out of: Portland, Oregon, United States
- Team: Sports Lab Fight Team
- Years active: 2005–2016

Mixed martial arts record
- Total: 28
- Wins: 18
- By knockout: 9
- By submission: 7
- By decision: 2
- Losses: 10
- By knockout: 1
- By submission: 6
- By decision: 3

Other information
- Mixed martial arts record from Sherdog

Ian Loveland (born September 7, 1983) is an American former professional mixed martial arts fighter. Loveland has fought for promotions such as King of the Cage, the International Fight League, and the Ultimate Fighting Championship.

== Mixed Martial Arts Career ==
Loveland's interest in martial arts started when he was five years old. He began training in Tae Kwon Do because, "I kept getting into fights and my parents wanted an outlet for me". Upon entering high school, Loveland realized Tae Kwon Do, "wasn't for me", and he picked up wrestling.

Before turning pro, Loveland held an amateur record of 7-0, with six submission wins and one lone knockout win. In 2005, Loveland made his professional debut defeating current UFC fighter, Bryan Caraway. He won his next two fights via first round submissions.

After earning a record of 4-4, Loveland signed onto fight for the Ring of Combat's featherweight tournament. His first fight was against former WEC fighter, Will Kerr. He defeated Kerr via first round submission, moving onto the semi-finals. Before continuing on in the tournament, Loveland defeated CJ Thompson in SportFight, and lost to Wagnney Fabiano in the International Fight League (IFL).

Loveland defeated Rich Boine in the semi-finals for the Ring of Combat tournament. A month later in the finals, Loveland was defeated by James Jones.

He lost his second fight for the IFL, being defeated by Jason Palacios. He bounced back from the two fight losing skid, winning all six of his next fights - one of which was featured for the IFL.

=== Ultimate Fighting Championship ===
With less than two weeks notice, Loveland stepped in for Leonard Garcia and fought Tyler Toner at The Ultimate Fighter 12 Finale. Loveland dominated all three rounds and won the fight via unanimous decision (30-27, 29-28, 30-26). After the fight, Loveland said he would likely drop to the bantamweight division.

Loveland faced Joseph Benavidez on March 19, 2011 at UFC 128. He lost the fight via unanimous decision.

Loveland fought Yves Jabouin on August 27, 2011 at UFC 134, losing via split decision. In the loss, Loveland suffered a possible chest injury and is out for up to 6 months. Despite the injury, he was released from the promotion.

== Mixed martial arts record ==
Professional record breakdown
28 matches	18 wins	10 losses
By knockout	9	1
By submission	7	6
By decision	2	3

Res.	Record	Opponent	Method	Event	Date	Round	Time	Location	Notes
Win	18–10	Enoch Wilson	Submission (armbar)	KOTC: No Fear	February 6, 2016	1	N/A	Lincoln City, Oregon, United States	
Win	17–10	Gabriel Solorio	TKO (punches)	WFC 25: Brawl at the Beach	July 26, 2014	1	N/A	Lincoln City, Oregon, United States	
Loss	16–10	Kyoji Horiguchi	Decision (unanimous)	Vale Tudo Japan 2012	December 24, 2012	3	5:00	Tokyo, Japan	
Win	16–9	Casey Olson	KO (head kick and punches)	Tachi Palace Fights 14	September 7, 2012	1	0:38	Lemoore, California, United States	Defended the Tachi Palace Fights Bantamweight Championship.
Win	15–9	Alexander Crispim	KO (knee)	Tachi Palace Fights 13	May 10, 2012	1	4:23	Lemoore, California, United States	Won the Tachi Palace Fights Bantamweight Championship.
Loss	14–9	Yves Jabouin	Decision (split)	UFC 134	August 27, 2011	3	5:00	Rio de Janeiro, Brazil	
Loss	14–8	Joseph Benavidez	Decision (unanimous)	UFC 128	March 19, 2011	3	5:00	Newark, New Jersey, United States	Bantamweight debut.
Win	14–7	Tyler Toner	Decision (unanimous)	The Ultimate Fighter 12 Finale	December 4, 2010	3	5:00	Las Vegas, Nevada, United States	
Win	13–7	Xavier Desrochers	TKO (punches)	Wreck MMA	April 16, 2010	1	0:41	Gatineau, Quebec, Canada	
Win	12–7	Douglas Evans	KO (head kick)	Arctic Combat 1	January 16, 2010	5	0:09	Fairbanks, Alaska, United States	
Win	11–7	Chris Barrera	TKO (punches)	Raw Power MMA	October 12, 2009	1	N/A	Bahrain	
Win	10–7	Chanti Johnson	KO (punches)	Rumble on the Ridge 6	November 21, 2009	1	0:32	Snoqualmie, Washington, United States	
Win	9–7	Dennis Davis	Submission (guillotine choke)	IFL: Las Vegas	February 29, 2008	2	0:58	Las Vegas, Nevada, United States	
Win	8–7	Andy Lukesh	Decision (unanimous)	SportFight 20: Homecoming	October 27, 2007	3	5:00	Portland, Oregon, United States	
Loss	7–7	Jason Palacios	Submission (rear-naked choke)	IFL: Everett	June 1, 2007	1	1:48	Everett, Washington, United States	
Loss	7–6	James Jones	Submission (armbar)	Ring of Combat 14	April 27, 2007	1	3:17	Atlantic City, New Jersey, United States	Tournament of Champions Finals.
Win	7–5	Rich Boine	Submission (guillotine choke)	Ring of Combat 13	March 16, 2007	1	1:22	Atlantic City, New Jersey, United States	Tournament of Champions Semifinals.
Loss	6–5	Wagnney Fabiano	Submission (arm-triangle choke)	IFL: Atlanta	February 23, 2007	1	0:59	Atlanta, Georgia, United States	
Win	6–4	CJ Thompson	Submission (rear-naked choke)	SF 18: Turning Point	January 6, 2007	1	3:23	Portland, Oregon, United States	
Win	5–4	Will Kerr	Submission (guillotine choke)	Ring of Combat 12	November 17, 2006	1	2:22	Atlantic City, New Jersey, United States	Tournament of Champions Quarterfinals.
Win	4–4	John Yim	TKO (punches)	KOTC: Insurrection	October 6, 2006	N/A	N/A	Vernon, British Columbia, Canada	
Loss	3–4	Trevor Burnell	TKO (punches)	SportFight 17: Hot Zone	August 5, 2006	1	1:01	Portland, Oregon, United States	
Loss	3–3	Enoch Wilson	Submission (rear-naked choke)	SportFight 15: Tribute	April 8, 2006	2	2:57	Portland, Oregon, United States	For the Sport Fight Featherweight Championship.
Loss	3–2	Ben Greer	Submission (rear-naked choke)	Elite Fighting 1	March 18, 2006	4	1:38	Vancouver, British Columbia, Canada	
Loss	3–1	Akitoshi Tamura	Submission (triangle choke)	MARS	February 4, 2006	1	3:40	Tokyo, Japan	
Win	3–0	Anthony Hamlett	Submission (rear-naked choke)	SportFight 14: Resolution	January 6, 2006	1	1:04	Portland, Oregon, United States	
Win	2–0	Joe Doherty	Submission (armbar)	SportFight 13: Rocky Mountain Sportfight	October 15, 2005	1	2:46	Denver, Colorado, United States	
Win	1–0	Bryan Caraway	TKO (cut)	SportFight 12: Breakout	September 16, 2005	2	0:31	Portland, Oregon, United States	
