= WEC 45 =

WEC MMA event in 2009

WEC 45: Cerrone vs. Ratcliff
- The poster for WEC 45: Cerrone vs. Ratcliff
- Promotion: World Extreme Cagefighting
- Date: December 19, 2009
- Venue: The Pearl at The Palms
- City: Paradise, Nevada
- Attendance: 1,741
- Total gate: $102,700

Event chronology
WEC 44: Brown vs. Aldo	WEC 45: Cerrone vs. Ratcliff	WEC 46: Varner vs. Henderson

WEC 45: Cerrone vs. Ratcliff was a mixed martial arts event held by World Extreme Cagefighting that took place on December 19, 2009 at The Pearl at The Palms in Las Vegas. It marked the first time the WEC has held back-to-back events at The Pearl at The Palms. The event drew an estimated 330,000 viewers on Versus.

== Background ==
Damacio Page was originally slated to face Takeya Mizugaki at this event, but was pulled from the card and replaced by Scott Jorgensen.

Mackens Semerzier was once linked to a bout with Erik Koch at this event, but it was later confirmed that Koch would instead be facing Jameel Massouh.

Debuting featherweights Brandon Visher and Tyler Toner were scheduled to face each other at this event, but Toner was removed from the event and replaced by fellow WEC newcomer Courtney Buck. The Visher/Toner bout was rescheduled for WEC 48 the following April, where Toner won via TKO.

David Smith was supposed to make his WEC debut against John Hosman at this event, but was later pulled from the card due to injury and replaced by fellow WEC newcomer Chad George.

== Results ==
Main card
Weight class				Method	Round	Time	Notes
Lightweight	Donald Cerrone	def	Ed Ratcliff	Submission (rear-naked choke)	3	3:47
Lightweight	Anthony Njokuani	def	Chris Horodecki	TKO (head kick and punches)	1	3:33
Bantamweight	Joseph Benavidez	def	Rani Yahya	TKO (punches)	1	1:35
Bantamweight	Scott Jorgensen	def	Takeya Mizugaki	Decision (unanimous) (29–28, 29–28, 29–28)	3	5:00
Preliminary card
Lightweight	Bart Palaszewski	def	Anthony Pettis	Decision (split) (30–27, 28-29, 29–28)	3	5:00
Lightweight	Zach Micklewright	def	Muhsin Corbbrey	Decision (split) (30–27, 30–27, 30–27)	3	5:00
Bantamweight	Chad George	def	John Hosman	Decision (unanimous) (30–27, 30–27, 30–27)	3	5:00
Featherweight	Brandon Visher	def	Courtney Buck	KO (punches)	1	4:45	(Note: This bout was aired on the live broadcast after the Benavidez/Yahya bout.)
Bantamweight	Brad Pickett	def	Kyle Dietz	Submission (Peruvian necktie)	2	4:36	(Note: This bout was aired on the live broadcast after the Njokuani/Horodecki bout.)
Featherweight	Erik Koch	def	Jameel Massouh	Decision (unanimous) (30–27, 30–27, 30–27)	3	5:00

== Bonus Awards ==
Fighters were awarded $10,000 bonuses.

- Fight of the Night: (United States) Donald Cerrone vs. (United States) Ed Ratcliff
- Knockout of the Night: (Nigeria) Anthony Njokuani
- Submission of the Night: (England) Brad Pickett

Fighters were awarded $5,000 bonuses.

- Second Fight of the Night: (Japan) Takeya Mizugaki vs. (United States) Scott Jorgensen

== Reported payout ==
The following is the reported payout to the fighters as reported to the Nevada State Athletic Commission. It does not include sponsor money or "locker room" bonuses often given by the WEC and also do not include the WEC's traditional "fight night" bonuses.

- Donald Cerrone: $24,000 (includes $12,000 win bonus) def. Ed Ratcliff: $9,000
- Anthony Njokuani: $8,000 ($4,000 win bonus) def. Chris Horodecki: $12,000
- Joseph Benavidez: $25,000 ($12,500 win bonus) def. Rani Yahya: $9,000
- Scott Jorgensen: $14,000 ($7,000 win bonus) def. Takeya Mizugaki: $8,000
- Bart Palaszewski: $10,000 ($5,000 win bonus) def. Anthony Pettis: $3,000
- Zach Micklewright: $4,000 ($2,000 win bonus) def. Muhsin Corbbrey: $4,000
- Chad George: $5,000 ($2,000 win bonus) def. John Hosman: $3,000
- Brandon Visher: $6,000 ($3,000 win bonus) def. Courtney Buck: $3,000
- Brad Pickett: $6,000 ($3,000 win bonus) def. Kyle Dietz: $2,000
- Erik Koch: $4,000 ($2,000 win bonus) def. Jameel Massouh: $3,000

== See also ==
- World Extreme Cagefighting
- List of World Extreme Cagefighting champions
- List of WEC events
- 2009 in WEC
