= Scott Jorgensen =

American mixed martial artist

- Born: September 17, 1982 (age 44); Payson, Utah, United States
- Other names: Young Guns
- Height: 5 ft 5 in (1.65 m)
- Weight: 135 lb (61 kg; 9.6 st)
- Division: Flyweight (2013–2014); Bantamweight (2006–2013, 2015–present)
- Reach: 66 in (170 cm)
- Fighting out of: Boise, Idaho, United States
- Team: Combat Fitness which is now known as SBG Idaho
- Rank: Blue belt in Brazilian Jiu-Jitsu
- Wrestling: NCAA Division I Wrestling
- Years active: 2006–2015

Mixed martial arts record
- Total: 27
- Wins: 15
- By knockout: 2
- By submission: 5
- By decision: 8
- Losses: 12
- By knockout: 2
- By submission: 4
- By decision: 6

Other information
- Website: Official UFC Profile
- Mixed martial arts record from Sherdog

Scott Jorgensen (born September 17, 1982) is an American retired mixed martial artist who competed in the Bantamweight division. A professional competitor since 2006, Jorgensen has formerly competed for the UFC, WEC, and ShoXC.

== Background ==
Born in Utah and raised in Alaska and Idaho, Jorgensen began wrestling at the age of five, going on to become a two-time state champion as well as a two-time state runner-up at Eagle High School. Jorgensen continued wrestling on a scholarship to Boise State University where he was a three-time Pac-10 Champion. Jorgensen has been diagnosed with vitiligo. According to Jorgensen from an interview with MMARecap.com, "Its just a pigmentation disorder that basically my immune system fights off pigment cells and loses its color." In another interview, he talks about when he first noticed it happening. "It started in ninth grade. I noticed a small spot on my wrist and I didn't think much of it. My mom offered to take me to a doctor but I didn't want to go. It kind of bothered me because I didn't know how to explain it to people ... and some people were ignorant. So I just involved myself with what I do best, which is wrestling, and I've always had lots of friends. It got to the point where I decided you'll either accept me or you won't and if it's because of my skin then you've got bigger issues than I do. I just don't care, it doesn't bother me. It's something that makes me who I am. It is me and it's never hindered me in any way. It's funny to see people talk about it."

== Mixed martial arts career ==
=== Early career ===
Jorgensen began his mixed martial arts career fighting in several respected regional promotions, including, X-Fighting Championships, Alaska Fighting Championships, Ring of Fire, and ShoXC.

=== World Extreme Cagefighting ===
Jorgensen made his WEC debut against Damacio Page at WEC 32, falling via unanimous decision, in a fight that has been reported as having Jorgensen suffering health problems from his vitiligo at the time of the fight. Jorgensen then went on to earn victories in his next two bouts against established veterans Kenji Osawa at WEC 35 and Frank Gomez at WEC 38.

Jorgensen dropped an extremely close split decision to Antonio Banuelos at WEC 41 in a bout that was described by Reed Harris as one of the best fights in all of 2009.

Jorgensen was scheduled to fight Rafael Rebello on September 2, 2009, at WEC 43. However, Rebello was forced to withdraw due to injury and was replaced by Noah Thomas. Jorgensen defeated Thomas via TKO in the first round.

Jorgensen defeated Takeya Mizugaki on December 19, 2009, at WEC 45, via unanimous decision (29-28, 29-28, 29-28). The bout also earned Fight of the Night honors.

Jorgensen's his next opponent was Chad George on March 6, 2010, at WEC 47. He won via submission due to a standing guillotine choke 31 seconds into the first round.

Jorgensen faced Antonio Banuelos in a long-awaited rematch on April 24, 2010, at WEC 48, replacing an injured Damacio Page. Jorgensen won the rematch by unanimous decision.

Jorgensen defeated Brad Pickett via unanimous decision on August 18, 2010, at WEC 50.

Jorgensen finally got his title shot and faced Dominick Cruz on December 16, 2010, at the promotion's final event, WEC 53. The winner of the bout would become both the final WEC Bantamweight Champion and the first ever UFC Bantamweight Champion, marking the first time a UFC title would be awarded outside the UFC. Jorgensen lost the fight via unanimous decision.

=== Ultimate Fighting Championship ===
In October 2010, World Extreme Cagefighting merged with the Ultimate Fighting Championship. As part of the merger, all WEC fighters were transferred to the UFC.

Jorgensen faced Ken Stone on June 4, 2011, at The Ultimate Fighter 13 Finale. Jorgensen won the fight via KO after knocking Stone out cold with punches from inside Stone's closed guard during the first round.

Jorgensen next faced Jeff Curran on October 29, 2011, at UFC 137. He won the fight via unanimous decision.

Jorgensen then fought Renan Barão on February 4, 2012, at UFC 143. He lost the fight via unanimous decision.

Jorgensen next faced Eddie Wineland on June 8, 2012, at UFC on FX 3. Wineland defeated Jorgenson via second-round knockout, notable for the fact it marked the first time that the durable Jorgensen had been stopped via strikes. Their back and forth action earned both participants Fight of the Night honors.

Jorgensen then faced John Albert on December 8, 2012, at UFC on Fox 5. Jorgensen won the fight via submission in the first round earning Submission of the Night and Fight of the Night honors for his performance.

Jorgensen faced Urijah Faber on April 13, 2013, in the main event at The Ultimate Fighter 17 Finale. After a fast-paced and technical fight, Faber submitted Jorgensen via rear naked choke at 3:16 in the 4th round.

==== Move to Flyweight ====
It was announced on September 17 that Jorgensen would be moving down to Flyweight. He was expected to face Ian McCall on December 14, 2013, at UFC on Fox 9. However, McCall was forced out of the bout with an injury and replaced by John Dodson. Then on December 3, Dodson himself was forced from the bout after sustaining a knee injury. Jorgensen instead faced promotional newcomer Zach Makovsky. He lost the fight via unanimous decision.

Jorgensen faced Jussier Formiga on March 23, 2014, at UFC Fight Night 38. Jorgensen lost the fight via submission in the first round. Formiga unintentionally butted Jorgensen's chin with the top of his skull, which went unnoticed by the referee and submitted the dazed Jorgensen via rear naked choke. Jorgensen appealed the headbutt to the Brazilian Athletic Commission, however the result was upheld.

Jorgensen faced Danny Martinez on June 7, 2014, at UFC Fight Night 42. He won the fight via unanimous decision. The win also earned Jorgensen his third Fight of the Night bonus award.

Jorgensen was expected to face promotional newcomer Henry Cejudo on August 30, 2014, at UFC 177. However, due to medical issues related to cutting weight, Cejudo was forced out the bout prior to the weigh-ins and Jorgensen was subsequently pulled from the event.

Jorgensen faced Wilson Reis on October 25, 2014, at UFC 179. Prior to the bout, Jorgensen missed weight and was fined 20% of his purse. He lost the fight via submission in the first round.

Jorgensen faced Manvel Gamburyan in a bantamweight bout on July 15, 2015, at UFC Fight Night 71. He lost the fight via unanimous decision.

Jorgensen faced Alejandro Pérez on November 21, 2015, at The Ultimate Fighter Latin America 2 Finale. He lost the fight via TKO due to an ankle injury in the second round.

On February 9, 2016, Jorgensen was released from the UFC.

== Personal life ==
Jorgensen has a son and a bachelor's degree in physiology. He also directs marketing for a home health company. Jorgensen is half-Caucasian and half-Japanese. Jorgensen is also a part owner of SBG Idaho in Boise, Idaho.

== Championships and accomplishments ==
- Ultimate Fighting Championship
  - Fight of the Night (Three times) vs. Eddie Wineland, John Albert, Danny Martinez
  - Submission of the Night (One time) vs. John Albert
- World Extreme Cagefighting
  - Fight of the Night (Two times) vs. Takeya Mizugaki, Brad Pickett

== Mixed martial arts record ==
Professional record breakdown
27 matches	15 wins	12 losses
By knockout	2	2
By submission	5	4
By decision	8	6

Res.	Record	Opponent	Method	Event	Date	Round	Time	Location	Notes
Loss	15–12	Alejandro Pérez	TKO (ankle injury)	The Ultimate Fighter Latin America 2 Finale: Magny vs. Gastelum	November 21, 2015	2	4:26	Monterrey, Mexico	
Loss	15–11	Manvel Gamburyan	Decision (unanimous)	UFC Fight Night: Mir vs. Duffee	July 15, 2015	3	5:00	San Diego, California, United States	Return to Bantamweight.
Loss	15–10	Wilson Reis	Submission (arm-triangle choke)	UFC 179	October 25, 2014	1	3:28	Rio de Janeiro, Brazil	Catchweight (128 lbs); Jorgensen missed weight.
Win	15–9	Danny Martinez	Decision (unanimous)	UFC Fight Night: Henderson vs. Khabilov	June 7, 2014	3	5:00	Albuquerque, New Mexico, United States	Fight of the Night.
Loss	14–9	Jussier Formiga	Submission (rear-naked choke)	UFC Fight Night: Shogun vs. Henderson 2	March 23, 2014	1	3:07	Natal, Brazil	
Loss	14–8	Zach Makovsky	Decision (unanimous)	UFC on Fox: Johnson vs. Benavidez 2	December 14, 2013	3	5:00	Sacramento, California, United States	Flyweight debut.
Loss	14–7	Urijah Faber	Submission (rear-naked choke)	The Ultimate Fighter: Team Jones vs. Team Sonnen Finale	April 13, 2013	4	3:16	Las Vegas, Nevada, United States	
Win	14–6	John Albert	Submission (rear-naked choke)	UFC on Fox: Henderson vs. Diaz	December 8, 2012	1	4:59	Seattle, Washington, United States	Submission of the Night. Fight of the Night.
Loss	13–6	Eddie Wineland	KO (punches)	UFC on FX: Johnson vs. McCall	June 8, 2012	2	4:10	Sunrise, Florida, United States	Fight of the Night.
Loss	13–5	Renan Barão	Decision (unanimous)	UFC 143	February 4, 2012	3	5:00	Las Vegas, Nevada, United States	
Win	13–4	Jeff Curran	Decision (unanimous)	UFC 137	October 29, 2011	3	5:00	Las Vegas, Nevada, United States	
Win	12–4	Ken Stone	KO (punches)	The Ultimate Fighter: Team Lesnar vs. Team dos Santos Finale	June 4, 2011	1	4:01	Las Vegas, Nevada, United States	
Loss	11–4	Dominick Cruz	Decision (unanimous)	WEC 53	December 16, 2010	5	5:00	Glendale, Arizona, United States	For the WEC Bantamweight Championship and the inaugural UFC Bantamweight Championship.
Win	11–3	Brad Pickett	Decision (unanimous)	WEC 50	August 18, 2010	3	5:00	Las Vegas, Nevada, United States	Fight of the Night
Win	10–3	Antonio Banuelos	Decision (unanimous)	WEC 48	April 24, 2010	3	5:00	Sacramento, California, United States	
Win	9–3	Chad George	Submission (front choke)	WEC 47	March 6, 2010	1	0:31	Columbus, Ohio, United States	
Win	8–3	Takeya Mizugaki	Decision (unanimous)	WEC 45	December 19, 2009	3	5:00	Las Vegas, Nevada, United States	Fight of the Night.
Win	7–3	Noah Thomas	TKO (punches and elbows)	WEC 43	October 10, 2009	1	3:13	San Antonio, Texas, United States	
Loss	6–3	Antonio Banuelos	Decision (split)	WEC 41	June 7, 2009	3	5:00	Sacramento, California, United States	
Win	6–2	Frank Gomez	Submission (guillotine choke)	WEC 38	January 25, 2009	1	1:09	San Diego, California, United States	
Win	5–2	Kenji Osawa	Decision (unanimous)	WEC 35	August 3, 2008	3	5:00	Las Vegas, Nevada, United States	
Loss	4–2	Damacio Page	Decision (unanimous)	WEC 32	February 13, 2008	3	5:00	Rio Rancho, New Mexico, United States	
Win	4–1	Chris David	Decision (unanimous)	ShoXC: Elite Challenger Series	July 27, 2007	3	5:00	Santa Ynez, California, United States	
Win	3–1	Tyler Toner	Decision (unanimous)	ROF 29: Aftershock	April 28, 2007	3	5:00	Boulder, Colorado, United States	
Loss	2–1	Joe Jesser	Submission (armbar)	ROF 26: Relentless	September 9, 2006	1	1:08	Colorado Springs, Colorado, United States	
Win	2–0	Louie Lagunsad	Submission (heel hook)	ROF 25: Overdrive	July 29, 2006	1	1:43	Boulder, Colorado, United States	
Win	1–0	Mike Morris	Submission (armbar)	Alaska Fighting Championship 24	June 15, 2006	1	1:31	Juneau, Alaska, United States	

== See also ==
- List of current UFC fighters
- List of male mixed martial artists
