= Brandon Visher =

American mixed martial arts fighter

- Born: May 6, 1984 (age 42); Hawaii, United States
- Other names: The Viper
- Height: 5 ft 9 in (1.75 m)
- Weight: 145 lb (66 kg; 10.4 st)
- Division: Lightweight; Featherweight
- Reach: 68 in (170 cm)
- Fighting out of: Maui, Hawaii, United States
- Team: Wailuku Boxing, Peak Performance Gym
- Years active: 2004-2010

Mixed martial arts record
- Total: 15
- Wins: 13
- By knockout: 6
- By submission: 4
- By decision: 3
- Losses: 2
- By knockout: 1
- By decision: 1

Other information
- Mixed martial arts record from Sherdog

Brandon Visher (born May 6, 1984) is a retired Hawaiian mixed martial artist. A professional from 2004 until 2010, he competed in the WEC.

== Background ==
Born and raised in Maui, Visher is a 2002 graduate of King Kekaulike High School, where he competed in wrestling.

== Mixed martial arts career ==
=== World Extreme Cagefighting ===
Visher made WEC debut against fellow WEC newcomer Courtney Buck on December 19, 2009, at WEC 45. He won via first-round KO.

Visher suffered the first loss of his professional career to WEC newcomer Tyler Toner by TKO in the first round on April 24, 2010, at WEC 48.

Visher was defeated by Yves Jabouin via unanimous decision on November 11, 2010, at WEC 52.

== Mixed martial arts record ==
Professional record breakdown
15 matches	13 wins	2 losses
By knockout	6	1
By submission	4	0
By decision	3	1
Draws	0	

Res.	Record	Opponent	Method	Event	Date	Round	Time	Location	Notes
Loss	13–3	Yves Jabouin	Decision (unanimous)	WEC 52	November 11, 2010	3	5:00	Las Vegas, Nevada, United States	
Loss	13–2	Tyler Toner	TKO (elbows)	WEC 48	April 24, 2010	1	2:36	Sacramento, California, United States	
Win	13–1	Courtney Buck	KO (punches)	WEC 45	December 19, 2009	1	4:45	Las Vegas, Nevada, United States	
Win	12–1	Isaac De Jesus	TKO (punches)	UNU 3: Visher vs. De Jesus	September 12, 2009	3	1:00	Honolulu, Hawaii, United States	
Win	11–1	Ed Newalu	TKO (punches)	UNU 2 Operation: Fire At Will	June 13, 2009	1	1:44	Wailuku, Hawaii, United States	
Win	10–1	Tyler Kahihikolo	Decision (unanimous)	UNU 1: Seek and Destroy	March 21, 2009	3	3:00	Wailuku, Hawaii, United States	
Win	9–1	Dave Moreno	Submission (rear-naked choke)	HW: Hazardous Warfare	January 3, 2009	2	2:31	Lahaina, Hawaii, United States	
Win	8–1	Ruben del Rosario	Submission (kimura)	X-1: Temple of Boom 2	October 25, 2008	2	N/A	Honolulu, Hawaii, United States	
Loss	7–1	Nick Mamalis	Decision (unanimous)	Kraze in the Cage: Chapter 9	July 11, 2008	3	5:00	Rock Springs, Wyoming, United States	
Win	7–0	Lorenzo Moreno	TKO (corner stoppage)	X-1: Legends	May 16, 2008	2	5:00	Honolulu, Hawaii, United States	
Win	6–0	Matt Comeau	Decision	Hawaii: Xtreme Combat	December 1, 2007	3	5:00	Hawaii, United States	Return to Featherweight.
Win	5–0	Tyler Kahihikolo	KO	FFM 3: Full Force MMA 3	October 13, 2007	1	4:50	Maui, Hawaii, United States	
Win	4–0	Abraham Cortes-Kaleopaa	Decision (unanimous)	FFM 2: Full Force MMA 2	April 27, 2007	3	3:00	Maui, Hawaii, United States	Featherweight bout.
Win	3–0	Jamar Dumlao	TKO (injury)	ROTR: Showdown in Maui	October 7, 2005	1	1:47	Maui, Hawaii, United States	
Win	2–0	Kevin Delima	Submission (armbar)	Ring of Fire 18: River Valley Rumble	May 21, 2005	1	3:21	Wailuku, Hawaii, United States	Lightweight debut.
Win	1–0	Albert Manners	TKO (submission to punches)	WOTR 7: Warriors of the Ring 7	November 6, 2004	1	2:38	Wailuku, Hawaii, United States	
