= Tyler Toner =

American former MMA fighter

- Born: Colorado, United States
- Other names: Thunder
- Nationality: American
- Height: 5 ft 9 in (1.75 m)
- Weight: 145 lb (66 kg; 10.4 st)
- Division: Featherweight
- Fighting out of: Denver, Colorado, United States
- Rank: Black belt in Taekwondo
- Years active: 2005-2014

Mixed martial arts record
- Total: 23
- Wins: 15
- By knockout: 8
- By submission: 3
- By decision: 4
- Losses: 7
- By submission: 2
- By decision: 5
- No contests: 1

Other information
- Mixed martial arts record from Sherdog

Tyler Toner is an American former professional mixed martial arts fighter. A professional from 2005 until 2014, he fought in the UFC, WEC, Strikeforce, and the RFA.

== Background ==
Born and raised in Colorado, Toner began training in Taekwondo at age five, and at age eight was the national point-sparring champion. In high school, Toner played football and trained in boxing and kickboxing.

== Mixed martial arts career ==
=== WEC ===
Toner was scheduled to make his World Extreme Cagefighting debut against Brandon Visher on December 19, 2009 at WEC 45. However, Toner was denied a license from the Nevada State Athletic Commission, because his vision was too poor to fight.

Toner instead faced Visher on April 24, 2010 at WEC 48. He won the fight via TKO (elbows) in the first round.

Toner faced Diego Nunes on September 30, 2010 at WEC 51. He lost the fight via unanimous decision.

=== Ultimate Fighting Championship ===
In October 2010, World Extreme Cagefighting merged with the Ultimate Fighting Championship. As part of the merger, all WEC fighters were transferred to the UFC.

Toner was expected to face Leonard Garcia on December 4, 2010 at The Ultimate Finale 12, but after Garcia was rescheduled to fight Nam Phan, Ian Loveland stepped in to face Toner. Toner lost the fight via unanimous decision (30-27, 30-26, 29-28).

After the loss, he was subsequently released from the promotion.

== Shootboxing ==
On June 1, 2009, Toner traveled to Japan on short notice to take on Shootboxing World Champion Kenichi Ogata. Widely considered a big underdog, Toner shocked the Japanese audience by knocking out Ogata with a head kick at 2:58 of the first round securing the upset win over the former champion.

== Personal life ==
Toner and his wife were married six weeks after his fight at WEC 48.

== Kickboxing Record ==
Res.	Record	Opponent	Method	Event	Date	Round	Time	Location	Notes
Win	1–0	(Japan) Kenichi Ogata	KO (high kick)	Shoot Boxing 2009 Bushido 3rd	June 1, 2009	1	2:58	Bunkyo, Tokyo, Japan	

== Mixed martial arts record ==
Professional record breakdown
23 matches	15 wins	7 losses
By knockout	8	0
By submission	3	2
By decision	4	5
No contests	1	

Res.	Record	Opponent	Method	Event	Date	Round	Time	Location	Notes
Loss	15–7 (1)	Daniel Aguiar	Submission (heel hook)	RFA 14: Manzanares vs. Maranhao	April 11, 2014	1	0:29	Cheyenne, Wyoming, United States	
Win	15–6 (1)	Gilbert Jimenez	Decision (unanimous)	Fight to Win: Paramount Prize Fighting 2014	February 7, 2014	3	5:00	Denver, Colorado, United States	
Loss	14–6 (1)	Raoni Barcelos	Decision (unanimous)	RFA 11: Manzanares vs. Makovsky	November 22, 2013	3	5:00	Broomfield, Colorado, United States	
Win	14–5 (1)	Cody Carrillo	TKO (punches)	ROF: Buckley MMA Fight Night	February 9, 2013	2	2:58	Aurora, Colorado, United States	
Loss	13–5 (1)	John Fraser	Decision (unanimous)	SFS 6: Score Fighting Series 6	October 19, 2012	3	5:00	Sarnia, Ontario, Canada	
Loss	13–4 (1)	Cameron Dollar	Submission (rear-naked choke)	ROF 43: Bad Blood	June 2, 2012	2	2:00	Broomfield, Colorado, United States	For the vacant ROF Featherweight Championship.
Win	13–3 (1)	Nick Macias	Decision (unanimous)	ROF 42: Who's Next	December 17, 2011	3	5:00	Broomfield, Colorado, United States	
Win	12–3 (1)	Gilbert Sims	TKO (punches)	ROF 41: Bragging Rights	August 20, 2011	3	3:49	Broomfield, Colorado, United States	Catchweight (147 lb) bout.
Loss	11–3 (1)	Ian Loveland	Decision (unanimous)	The Ultimate Fighter 12 Finale	December 4, 2010	3	5:00	Las Vegas, Nevada, United States	
Loss	11–2 (1)	Diego Nunes	Decision (unanimous)	WEC 51	September 30, 2010	3	5:00	Broomfield, Colorado, United States	
Win	11–1 (1)	Brandon Visher	TKO (elbows)	WEC 48	April 24, 2010	1	2:36	Sacramento, California, United States	
Win	10–1 (1)	Fabio Serrão	Decision (unanimous)	ROF 35: Summer Brawl	August 1, 2009	3	5:00	Broomfield, Colorado, United States	
Win	9–1 (1)	D.J. Fuentes	TKO (punches)	ROF 34: Judgment Day	April 11, 2009	1	3:35	Broomfield, Colorado, United States	
NC	8–1 (1)	Jamie Schmidt	No Contest	ROF 33: Adrenaline	January 10, 2009	2	0:27	Broomfield, Colorado, United States	
Win	8–1	Ricky Johnson	TKO (punches)	Strikeforce: Payback	October 3, 2008	2	3:44	Broomfield, Colorado, United States	
Win	7–1	Brett Roller	Submission (triangle choke)	Battlequest 7: RESURRECTION	February 22, 2008	1	0:55	Denver, Colorado, United States	
Win	6–1	Nick Mamalis	Submission (armbar)	Battlequest 6: SHOOTOUT	July 21, 2007	1	4:23	Eagle, Colorado, United States	
Loss	5–1	Scott Jorgensen	Decision (unanimous)	ROF 29: Aftershock	April 28, 2007	3	5:00	Broomfield, Colorado, United States	
Win	5–0	Joe Jesser	Decision (split)	ROF 27: Collision Course	December 9, 2006	3	5:00	Denver, Colorado, United States	
Win	4–0	Mike Aragon	TKO (strikes)	ROF 24: Integrity	June 17, 2006	1	N/A	Castle Rock, Colorado, United States	
Win	3–0	Gerald Lovato	KO (punch)	ROF 23: Impact	April 1, 2006	1	0:22	Colorado, United States	
Win	2–0	Pete Ozuk	Submission (triangle choke)	ROF 20: Elite	December 10, 2005	1	1:00	Castle Rock, Colorado, United States	
Win	1–0	Josh Alloway	TKO (punches)	Ring of Fire 18: River Valley Rumble	July 30, 2005	1	N/A	North Platte, Nebraska, United States	
