= Casey Olson =

American mixed martial arts fighter

- Other names: The Underdog
- Nationality: American
- Height: 5 ft 8 in (1.73 m)
- Weight: 135 lb (61 kg; 9.6 st)
- Division: Lightweight; Featherweight; Bantamweight
- Fighting out of: San Luis Obispo, California, United States
- Team: The Pit
- Years active: 2005-2012.

Mixed martial arts record
- Total: 18
- Wins: 14
- By knockout: 4
- By submission: 4
- By decision: 6
- Losses: 4
- By knockout: 2
- By submission: 1
- By decision: 1

Other information
- Mixed martial arts record from Sherdog

Casey Olson is a retired American mixed martial arts fighter. A professional from 2005 until 2012, he fought in the WEC, Strikeforce, and Tachi Palace Fights promotions. Olson also coached at Clovis North High School.

== Background ==
Olson attended Clovis High School, where he was a two-time captain of the wrestling team. Olson later attended Fresno City College. At FCC, he was a two-time captain, two-time All-American, and State Champion. After two seasons, Olson transferred to Fresno State University where he was a two-time NCAA Qualifier and Northern Regional Champion. Olson was also a two-time captain for Fresno State.

== Mixed martial arts career ==
=== World Extreme Cagefighting ===
Olson made his professional debut for California-based promotion, WEC. After compiling a 4-0 record, Olson signed with Strikeforce.

=== Strikeforce ===
Olson made his promotional debut at Strikeforce: Tank vs. Buentello, against Bobby Sanchez. Olson won via first-round submission, but would go 6-3 on the regional circuit before returning to face Chris Culley at Strikeforce Challengers: Gurgel vs. Evangelista in 2009. Olson won via first-round TKO.

=== Tachi Palace Fights ===
Olson then fought in the Tachi Palace Fights promotion, winning his first two fights before facing Ian Loveland for the TPF Bantamweight Championship. Olson was defeated via knockout in the first round.

== Mixed martial arts record ==
Professional record breakdown
18 matches	14 wins	4 losses
By knockout	4	2
By submission	4	1
By decision	6	1

Res.	Record	Opponent	Method	Event	Date	Round	Time	Location	Notes
Loss	14–4	Ian Loveland	KO (head kick and punches)	Tachi Palace Fights 14	September 7, 2012	1	0:38	Lemoore, California, United States	For Tachi Palace Fights Bantamweight Championship
Win	14–3	Cody Gibson	Decision (unanimous)	Tachi Palace Fights 12	March 9, 2012	3	5:00	Lemoore, California, United States	
Win	13–3	Shawn Klarcyk	Decision (unanimous)	TPF 4: Cinco de Mayhem	May 5, 2010	3	3:00	Lemoore, California, United States	
Win	12–3	Chris Culley	TKO (punches)	Strikeforce Challengers: Gurgel vs. Evangelista	November 6, 2009	1	2:32	Fresno, California, United States	Catchweight (148 lb) bout; Culley missed weight.
Loss	11–3	Eddie Yagin	Submission (guillotine choke)	PFC 13: Validation	May 8, 2009	1	1:16	Lemoore, California, United States	
Win	11–2	Tony Boyles	Submission (arm-triangle choke)	CCFC: Rumble in the Park II	November 1, 2008	1	2:28	Fresno, California, United States	
Win	10–2	Aaron Miller	Submission (arm-triangle choke)	CCFC: Rumble in the Park	August 23, 2008	1	4:30	Fresno, California, United States	
Win	9–2	Tito Jones	Decision (unanimous)	PFC 9: The Return	July 18, 2008	3	3:00	Lemoore, California, United States	
Win	8–2	Sergio Quinones	Submission (rear naked choke)	PFC 8: A Night of Champions	May 8, 2008	1	0:46	Lemoore, California, United States	
Loss	7–2	Olaf Alfonso	KO (punch)	PFC: Olson vs. Alfonso	February 29, 2008	2	1:50	Lemoore, California, United States	
Win	7–1	Scott Brommage	TKO (punches)	PFC 6: No Retreat, No Surrender	January 17, 2008	1	1:48	Lemoore, California, United States	
Win	6–1	Brandon Jinnies	Decision (unanimous)	PFC 3: Step Up	July 19, 2007	3	3:00	Lemoore, California, United States	
Loss	5–1	Isaiah Hill	Decision (split)	Warrior Cup 2	April 7, 2007	3	5:00	Stockton, California, United States	
Win	5–0	Bobby Sanchez	Submission (guillotine choke)	Strikeforce: Tank vs. Buentello	October 7, 2006	1	1:58	Fresno, California, United States	
Win	4–0	Chris Solomon	Decision (unanimous)	WEC 23: Hot August Fights	August 17, 2006	3	5:00	Lemoore, California, United States	
Win	3–0	Alvin Cacdac	TKO (punches)	WEC 22: The Hitmen	July 28, 2006	1	2:28	Lemoore, California, United States	
Win	2–0	Joe Martin	Decision (unanimous)	WEC 18: Unfinished Business	January 13, 2006	3	5:00	Lemoore, California, United States	
Win	1–0	Rolland Parli	TKO (punches)	WEC 16	August 18, 2005	1	4:58	Lemoore, California, United States	
