= Jameel Massouh =

American mixed martial arts fighter

- Born: September 12, 1984 (age 42); Kenosha, Wisconsin, United States
- Other names: The Sergeant
- Height: 5 ft 10 in (1.78 m)
- Weight: 145 lb (66 kg; 10.4 st)
- Division: Featherweight
- Reach: 72.5 in (184 cm)
- Fighting out of: Milwaukee, Wisconsin, United States
- Team: Freestyle Academy
- Years active: 2005-2011

Kickboxing record
- Total: 1
- Wins: 0
- Losses: 1
- Draws: 0

Mixed martial arts record
- Total: 35
- Wins: 26
- By knockout: 7
- By submission: 13
- By decision: 6
- Losses: 9
- By knockout: 1
- By submission: 3
- By decision: 5
- Draws: 0

Other information
- Mixed martial arts record from Sherdog
- Last updated on: May 11, 2013

Jameel Badih Massouh (born September 12, 1984) is a retired American mixed martial artist. A professional from 2005 until 2011, he fought in the WEC, Bellator, Pancrase, and King of the Cage.

== Mixed martial arts career ==
=== Early career ===
After making his professional debut in early 2005, compiling an undefeated 11–0 record before being defeated by veteran Tristan Yunker.

=== World Extreme Cagefighting ===
Massouh made his WEC debut on April 5, 2009 losing via unanimous decision to Raphael Assunção at WEC 40.

Massouh was defeated by WEC newcomer Erik Koch on December 19, 2009 at WEC 45.

He lost to Michael Mananquil via split decision in the quarter-finals of the 2013 Road To Glory USA 70kg Tournament in Milwaukee, Wisconsin on May 11, 2013.

== Personal life ==
He is of Lebanese and Scotch-Irish descent.

== Kickboxing record ==
Kickboxing record
0 wins (0 KOs), 1 loss, 0 draws
Date	Result	Opponent	Event	Location	Method	Round	Time	Record
2013-05-11	Loss	(United States) Michael Mananquil	Road to Glory USA 70 kg Tournament, Quarter Finals	Milwaukee, Wisconsin, USA	Decision (split)	3	3:00	0-1
Legend: Win Loss Draw/No contest Notes

== Mixed martial arts record ==
Professional record breakdown
35 matches	26 wins	9 losses
By knockout	7	1
By submission	13	3
By decision	6	5

Res.	Record	Opponent	Method	Event	Date	Round	Time	Location	Notes
Loss	26–9	John Cholish	Submission (guillotine choke)	CFFC 9: Beach Brawl	June 10, 2011	2	2:25	Atlantic City, New Jersey, United States	
Win	26–8	Steve Kinnison	Submission (twister)	KOTC: Outkasts	April 9, 2011	1	1:27	Lac du Flambeau, Wisconsin, United States	
Loss	25–8	Rolando Delgado	Decision (unanimous)	Bellator 37	March 19, 2011	3	5:00	Concho, Oklahoma, United States	
Win	25–7	Chico Camus	Decision (unanimous)	NAFC: Badd Blood	November 24, 2010	3	5:00	Milwaukee, Wisconsin, United States	
Win	24–7	Nick Mamalis	Submission (guillotine choke)	Bellator 29	September 16, 2010	1	4:27	Milwaukee, Wisconsin, United States	
Win	23–7	Mike Erosa	Submission	Maxx FC 9: Fighting Fathers	June 18, 2010	2	0:36	San Juan, Puerto Rico	
Win	22–7	Sami Aziz	Decision (unanimous)	Superior Challenge 5	May 1, 2010	3	5:00	Stockholm, Sweden	Won the Superior Challenge Featherweight Championship.
Loss	21–7	Erik Koch	Decision (unanimous)	WEC 45	December 19, 2009	3	5:00	Las Vegas, Nevada, United States	
Loss	21–6	Leonard Garcia	Decision (split)	WEC 42	August 9, 2009	3	5:00	Las Vegas, Nevada, United States	
Loss	21–5	Raphael Assunção	Decision (unanimous)	WEC 40	April 5, 2009	3	5:00	Chicago, Illinois, United States	
Win	21–4	Vladimir Zenin	Submission (rear-naked choke)	fightFORCE: Day of Anger	February 28, 2009	2	2:26	Saint Petersburg, Russia	
Win	20–4	Masaya Takita	TKO (punches)	Pancrase: Changing Tour 1	February 1, 2009	1	2:30	Tokyo, Japan	
Win	19–4	Shinya Kumazawa	Submission (triangle choke)	Gekitotsu: Clash the Nations 1	November 23, 2008	2	2:54	Kumamoto, Kumamoto, Japan	
Win	18–4	Ryan Healy	Decision (unanimous)	EVO MMA: Evolution MMA	October 4, 2008	3	5:00	Phoenix, Arizona, United States	
Win	17–4	Mike Suttles	Submission (arm-triangle choke)	FCC 36: Freestyle Combat Challenge 36	September 12, 2008	1	N/A	Racine, Wisconsin, United States	
Loss	16–4	Clay French	Submission (rear-naked choke)	Adrenaline MMA: Guida vs. Russow	June 14, 2008	2	3:17	Chicago, Illinois, United States	
Win	16–3	Myles Merola	Decision (unanimous)	HCF: Crow's Nest	March 29, 2008	3	5:00	Gatineau, Quebec, Canada	
Win	15–3	Craig Howard	Submission (armbar)	FCC 33: Freestyle Combat Challenge 33	February 23, 2008	1	1:11	Racine, Wisconsin, United States	
Loss	14–3	Miki Shida	Decision (unanimous)	Pancrase: Rising 10	December 22, 2007	2	5:00	Tokyo, Japan	
Win	14–2	David Messiahs	TKO	FCC 29: Freestyle Combat Challenge 29	August 11, 2007	1	N/A	Racine, Wisconsin, United States	
Win	13–2	Elton Chavez	KO (kick)	MT 12: Madtown Throwdown 12	July 28, 2007	2	0:21	Madison, Wisconsin, United States	
Loss	12–2	Daiki Hata	TKO (injury)	Pancrase: Rising 5	May 30, 2007	2	4:50	Tokyo, Japan	
Win	12–1	Dustin Neace	Decision (unanimous)	FCC 26: Freestyle Combat Challenge 26	March 10, 2007	3	N/A	Racine, Wisconsin, United States	
Loss	11–1	Tristan Yunker	Submission (armbar)	FCC 25: Freestyle Combat Challenge 25	January 13, 2007	1	N/A	Racine, Wisconsin, United States	
Win	11–0	Dustin Neace	Submission	DFC 1: Diesel Fighting Championships 1	June 30, 2006	3	4:50	Dallas, Texas, United States	
Win	10–0	Mike Lambrecht	TKO	MT 7: Madtown Throwdown 7	April 29, 2006	N/A	N/A	Madison, Wisconsin, United States	
Win	9–0	Jim Bruketta	Decision (unanimous)	FCC 22: Freestyle Combat Challenge 22	March 18, 2006	2	5:00	Racine, Wisconsin, United States	
Win	8–0	Greg Klemp	Submission (rear-naked choke)	MT 6: Madtown Throwdown 6	January 13, 2006	N/A	N/A	Madison, Wisconsin, United States	
Win	7–0	Josh Pankey	TKO	FCC 21: Freestyle Combat Challenge 21	January 7, 2006	1	N/A	Racine, Wisconsin, United States	
Win	6–0	Greg Klemp	Submission (rear-naked choke)	MT 5: Madtown Throwdown 5	October 15, 2005	N/A	N/A	Madison, Wisconsin, United States	
Win	5–0	Justin Coates	TKO	FCC 20: Freestyle Combat Challenge 20	September 24, 2005	N/A	N/A	Racine, Wisconsin, United States	
Win	4–0	Eugene Crisler	Submission (triangle choke)	MT 4: Madtown Throwdown 4	July 9, 2005	N/A	N/A	Madison, Wisconsin, United States	
Win	3–0	Devon Green	Submission (triangle choke)	MT 3: Madtown Throwdown 3	May 21, 2005	N/A	N/A	Madison, Wisconsin, United States	
Win	2–0	Chaylen Rader	Submission (rear-naked choke)	FCC 18: Freestyle Combat Challenge 18	March 5, 2005	1	N/A	Racine, Wisconsin, United States	
Win	1–0	Robert Mrotek	TKO (punches)	MT 2: Madtown Throwdown 2	February 19, 2005	N/A	N/A	Madison, Wisconsin, United States	
