= Nick Mamalis =

American mixed martial arts fighter

- Born: June 19, 1986 (age 40); Green River, Wyoming, United States
- Other names: Garfield
- Nationality: American
- Height: 5 ft 7 in (1.70 m)
- Weight: 135 lb (61 kg; 9.6 st)
- Division: Featherweight; Bantamweight; Flyweight
- Stance: Orthodox
- Fighting out of: Green River, Wyoming, United States
- Years active: 2006–present

Mixed martial arts record
- Total: 43
- Wins: 28
- By knockout: 9
- By submission: 12
- By decision: 7
- Losses: 14
- By knockout: 2
- By submission: 9
- By decision: 3
- No contests: 1

Other information
- Website: http://www.nickmamalis.com
- Mixed martial arts record from Sherdog

Nick Mamalis (born June 19, 1986) is an American mixed martial artist who most recently competed in the Bantamweight division. A professional competitor since 2006, he has competed for Bellator and Absolute Championship Berkut.

== Background ==
Born and raised in Wyoming, Mamalis began wrestling at the age of six. At Green River High School, Mamalis continued with wrestling as well as playing football. He won three state titles for wrestling, in addition to a runner-up finish. In football, he won All-State honors and helped lead his team to a state title. In college, Mamalis wrestled for the Western Wyoming Community College Mustangs where he was the national runner-up at 125 lbs. during his sophomore season.

== Mixed martial arts career ==
=== Bellator Fighting Championships ===
Mamalis made his Bellator Fighting Championships debut at Bellator 20, against Mark Oshiro. Oshiro entered the fight as a heavy favorite, having already been signed to compete in the Bellator season three bantamweight tournament, but Mamalis defeated Oshiro 1:29 into round 2 via rear naked choke.

With the victory, Mamalis earned a shot at a tournament qualifier bout at Bellator 23. His opponent, also fighting for a spot in the upcoming tournament, was Albert Rios. Once again, Mamalis entered the fight as the betting underdog. He defeated Rios via TKO due to strikes 4:40 into the first round, securing his place in the tournament. He would then lose consecutive fights at Bellator 27 and 29.

=== Absolute Championship Berkut ===
Mamalis faced Terrion Ware on January 13, 2017 at ACB 51. He lost the fight by unanimous decision.

== Bare-knuckle boxing ==
Mamalis faced Johnny Bedford at BKFC 1 held on June 2, 2018. He lost the fight via TKO in the second round.

== Mixed martial arts record ==
Professional record breakdown
44 matches	29 wins	14 losses
By knockout	9	2
By submission	12	9
By decision	8	3
No contests	1	

Res.	Record	Opponent	Method	Event	Date	Round	Time	Location	Notes
Loss	28–14 (1)	Ray Rodriguez	Submission (d'arce choke)	Rocks Xtreme MMA 26	April 20, 2019	1	2:23	Corpus Christi, Texas, United States	
Loss	28–13 (1)	Ricky Bandejas	KO (punch)	Cage Fury Fighting Championships 69	December 16, 2017	4	4:07	Atlantic City, New Jersey, United States	For the CFFC Bantamweight Championship.
Loss	28–12 (1)	Kevin Gray	Technical Submission (guillotine choke)	Victory Fighting Championship 57	May 5, 2017	2	3:53	Topeka, Kansas, United States	
Win	28–11 (1)	Nick Urso	TKO (punches)	Top Shelf Entertainment: Rocky Mountain Rubicon 4	February 4, 2017	2	0:48	Fountain, Colorado, United States	
Loss	27–11 (1)	Terrion Ware	Decision (unanimous)	ACB 51: Silva vs. Torgeson	January 13, 2017	3	5:00	Irvine, California, United States	
Win	27–10 (1)	Adam Imhoff	TKO	Rocky Mountain MMA 12: Fists of Fury 3	March 19, 2016	1	1:00	Rock Springs, Wyoming, United States	
Win	26–10 (1)	Juan Santa Cruz	TKO (injury)	Rocky Mountain MMA 11: Fists of Fury 2	August 29, 2015	1	2:05	Rock Springs, Wyoming, United States	Featherweight bout.
Win	25–10 (1)	Craig Ross	Decision (unanimous)	JHEFN: Jeremy Horn's Elite Fight Night 26	March 6, 2015	3	5:00	Salt Lake City, Utah, United States	
Loss	24–10 (1)	Czar Sklavos	Submission (guillotine choke)	Rocky Mountain MMA: Fist of Fury	September 14, 2013	1	4:50	Rock Springs, Wyoming, United States	
Win	24–9 (1)	Nick Honstein	Decision (unanimous)	SCL: Rivals	February 23, 2013	3	5:00	Denver, Colorado, United States	
Loss	23–9 (1)	Nick Denis	KO (slam)	Wreck MMA: Unfinished Business	October 28, 2011	2	1:03	Gatineau, Quebec, Canada	
Win	23–8 (1)	Randy Villarreal	Submission (rear-naked Choke)	BTT MMA 2: Genesis	October 1, 2011	1	3:24	Pueblo, Colorado, United States	
Win	22–8 (1)	Adrian Wooley	Decision (split)	Score Fighting Series 1	June 10, 2011	3	5:00	Mississauga, Ontario, Canada	
Loss	21–8 (1)	Ryan Roberts	Decision (unanimous)	The Cage Inc.: Battle at the Border 9	April 23, 2011	5	5:00	Hankinson, North Dakota, United States	For the Cage Inc. Bantamweight Championship.
Win	21–7 (1)	Josh Rave	Submission (punches)	VFC: Victory Fighting Championship 33	December 11, 2010	2	1:30	Iowa, United States	
Loss	20–7 (1)	Jameel Massouh	Submission (guillotine choke)	Bellator 29	September 16, 2010	1	4:27	Milwaukee, Wisconsin, United States	Catchweight (140 lbs) bout.
Loss	20–6 (1)	Zach Makovsky	Decision (unanimous)	Bellator 27	September 2, 2010	3	5:00	San Antonio, Texas, United States	
Win	20–5 (1)	Albert Rios	TKO (strikes)	Bellator 23	June 24, 2010	1	4:40	Louisville, Kentucky, United States	
Win	19–5 (1)	Mark Oshiro	Submission (rear-naked choke)	Bellator 20	May 27, 2010	2	1:29	San Antonio, Texas, United States	
Loss	18–5 (1)	Rafael de Freitas	Submission (rear-naked Choke)	Chavez Dojo - Revolutionary Rumble	May 1, 2010	1	2:12	Albuquerque, New Mexico, Mexico	
Win	18–4 (1)	Zach Wolff	Decision (unanimous)	VFC 30: Night of Champions	February 5, 2010	5	5:00	Council Bluffs, Iowa, United States	Won the VFC Bantamweight Championship.
Win	17–4 (1)	Emmanuel Chapman	TKO (punches)	FI: Fight Industries	November 14, 2009	1	1:53	Rock Springs, Wyoming, United States	
Win	16–4 (1)	Ron Muir	TKO (corner stoppage)	FTW Featherweight Grand Prix Final Round	September 12, 2009	1	5:00	Denver, Colorado, United States	Won the FTW Featherweight Grand Prix.
Win	15–4 (1)	Jesse Henley	Submission (guillotine choke)	FTW Featherweight Grand Prix Round Two	July 10, 2009	1	1:00	Denver, Colorado, United States	
Loss	14–4 (1)	Jesse Brock	Submission (kneebar)	Jeremy Horn's Elite Fight Night 9	June 26, 2009	2	2:58	Layton, Utah, United States	
Win	14–3 (1)	Jeff Willingham	TKO (punches)	WOFCF 3	June 25, 2009	1	2:43	Green River, Wyoming, United States	
Win	13–3 (1)	Olly Bradstreet	Submission (triangle choke)	WOFCF 2	May 28, 2009	2	4:26	Rock Springs, Wyoming, United States	
Win	12–3 (1)	Vellore Cabellero	TKO (punches)	FTW Featherweight Grand Prix Opening Round	May 8, 2009	2	0:44	Denver, Colorado, United States	
Loss	11–3 (1)	Steven Siler	Submission (guillotine choke)	Throwdown Showdown 3	February 20, 2009	1	1:25	Salt Lake City, Utah, United States	
Win	11–2 (1)	Woody Gonzales	TKO (punches)	Kraze in the Cage: Chapter 12	January 24, 2008	1	N/A	Rock Springs, Wyoming, United States	
Win	10–2 (1)	Eddie Pelczynski	Submission (rear-naked Choke)	WOFCF: Word of Fist Cage Fights 1	January 8, 2008	2	N/A	Rock Springs, Wyoming, United States	
Win	9–2 (1)	Ray Wolfley	Submission (armbar)	Kraze in the Cage: Chapter 11	December 13, 2008	1	N/A	Rock Springs, Wyoming, United States	
Win	8–2 (1)	Ty Hamblin	Decision (unanimous)	Kraze in the Cage: Chapter 10	August 15, 2008	3	5:00	Rock Springs, Wyoming, United States	
Win	7–2 (1)	Brandon Visher	Decision (unanimous)	Kraze in the Cage: Chapter 9	July 11, 2008	3	5:00	Rock Springs, Wyoming, United States	
Win	6–2 (1)	Mike Smith	Decision (unanimous)	Kraze in the Cage: Chapter 8	May 9, 2008	3	5:00	Rock Springs, Wyoming, United States	
NC	5–2 (1)	Travis Marx	No Contest	Jeremy Horn's Elite Fight Night 1	April 5, 2008	2	3:33	Salt Lake City, Utah, United States	
Win	5–2	Ryan Schofield	Submission (rear-naked choke)	Kraze in the Cage: Chapter 7, Vol. 2	March 26, 2008	1	N/A	Rock Springs, Wyoming, United States	
Win	4–2	Brenton Swanson	Submission (rear-naked choke)	Kraze in the Cage: Chapter 7, Vol. 1	January 26, 2008	2	N/A	Rock Springs, Wyoming, United States	
Loss	3–2	Tyler Toner	Submission (armbar)	Battlequest 6: Shootout	July 21, 2007	1	4:23	Eagle, Colorado, United States	
Win	3–1	Dan Berry	Submission (triangle choke)	UCE Round 26: Episode 12	June 23, 2007	1	1:29	Ogden, Utah, United States	
Win	2–1	Erick Buck	Submission (punches)	Battlequest 5: Avalanche	March 21, 2007	2	0:41	Vail, Colorado, United States	
Win	1–1	Steve Hellman	Submission (triangle choke)	KITC: Kraze in the Cage	January 12, 2007	1	N/A	Wyoming, United States	
Loss	0–1	Raphael Assunção	Submission (armbar)	Ring of Fire 26	September 9, 2006	1	3:35	Castle Rock, Colorado, United States	

== Bare knuckle record ==
Professional record breakdown
1 match	0 wins	1 loss
By knockout	0	1

Res.	Record	Opponent	Method	Event	Date	Round	Time	Location	Notes
Loss	0-1	Johnny Bedford	TKO (punches)	BKFC 1	June 2, 2018	2	1:41	Cheyenne, Wyoming, United States	
