= Chad George =

American mixed martial artist

- Born: April 30, 1982 (age 44); Los Angeles, California, United States
- Other names: Savage
- Height: 5 ft 6 in (1.68 m)
- Weight: 135 lb (61 kg; 9.6 st)
- Division: Bantamweight
- Reach: 68 in (170 cm)
- Fighting out of: Los Angeles, California, United States
- Team: California Mixed Martial Arts
- Rank: Black belt in Brazilian Jiu-Jitsu
- Years active: 2005-present

Mixed martial arts record
- Total: 25
- Wins: 17
- By knockout: 5
- By submission: 9
- By decision: 3
- Losses: 8
- By submission: 6
- By decision: 2

Other information
- Mixed martial arts record from Sherdog

Chad George (born April 30, 1982) is a retired American professional mixed martial artist. Chad has fought in the WEC, Bellator, Tachi Palace, BAMMA and many other MMA Organizations. He also competes in Brazilian jiu-jitsu and has been featured in Metamoris Challengers, Fight To Win and the Eddie Bravo Invitational.

In 2017 Chad become the first ever bantamweight Combat Jiu-Jitsu World Champion.

Chad holds a notable victory over UFC flyweight Kai Kara-France.

== Mixed martial arts career ==
=== Early career ===
George made his professional MMA debut in April 2005.

=== WEC ===
In his WEC debut, George defeated John Hosman at WEC 45 on December 19, 2009, via unanimous decision.

In his second fight for the promotion, George faced Scott Jorgensen at WEC 47, on March 6, 2010. George lost via a standing guillotine choke submission in the first round.

George next faced Antonio Banuelos at WEC 51 on September 30, 2010. George lost the fight by decision and was subsequently released from his contract with Zuffa, LLC after the UFC/WEC merger in December 2010.

=== Post-WEC ===
George would later return to competitive fighting with a submission win over Bobby Sanchez at BAMMA USA: Badbeat 2 on June 11, 2011. In December 2011, George traveled to New Zealand to compete against the native champion and now UFC flyweight contender, Kai Kara-France, at The Cage 2; George won with a first-round KO.

=== Bellator MMA ===
George made his debut for Bellator MMA on April 10, 2015, at Bellator 136. George faced Mark Vorgeas and won the fight via technical submission in the first round. The fight is notable as Vorgeas went unconscious during a submission, George notices this and refused to punch his opponent instead choosing to argue with the referee until the referee noticed that Vorgeas was indeed unconscious.

== Occupation: Fighter ==
An 85-minute feature film documentary by Bavayou Films was produced following eight months in the life of Chad George. Later, it was released by Filmbuff & Cinetic Media, made available worldwide via Netflix, Video On Demand, iTunes and Amazon video.

== Championships and accomplishments ==
=== Combat jiu-jitsu ===
- Eddie Bravo Invitational
  - EBI Bantamweight World Championship (One time)

== Mixed martial arts record ==
Professional record breakdown
26 matches	18 wins	8 losses
By knockout	5	0
By submission	11	6
By decision	2	2
Draws	0	

Res.	Record	Opponent	Method	Event	Date	Round	Time	Location	Notes
Win	18–8	Hector Valenzuela	Submission (Arm triangle)	LXF 2	July 6, 2019	2	4:01	Burbank, California, United States	
Win	17–8	James Barnes	TKO (doctor stoppage)	Bellator 192	January 20, 2018	2	5:00	Inglewood, California, United States	
Win	16–8	Mark Voregas	Technical Submission (Von Flue choke)	Bellator 136	April 10, 2015	1	3:37	Irvine, California, United States	Featherweight bout.
Win	15–8	Sam Rodriguez	Submission (rear-naked choke)	NFA Valley Invasion	August 8, 2014	1	1:57	Woodland Hills, California, United States	Featherweight bout.
Loss	14–8	Cody Gibson	Submission (guillotine choke)	TWC 18: Halloween Havoc III	October 25, 2013	1	4:39	Porterville, California, United States	Catchweight (140 lb) bout.
Loss	14–7	Joe Soto	Technical Submission (guillotine choke)	Tachi Palace Fights 13	May 10, 2012	2	2:01	Lemoore, California, United States	
Win	14–6	Shad Smith	Submission (arm-triangle choke)	BAMMA USA: Badbeat 5	March 16, 2012	1	1:56	Commerce, California, United States	Featherweight bout.
Win	13–6	Kai Kara-France	KO (punches)	The Cage 2: USA vs. New Zealand	December 2, 2011	1	2:32	Whakatāne, New Zealand	
Win	12–6	Bobby Sanchez	Submission (arm-triangle choke)	BAMMA USA: Badbeat 2	June 11, 2011	1	2:32	Commerce, California, United States	
Loss	11–6	Antonio Banuelos	Decision (unanimous)	WEC 51	September 30, 2010	3	5:00	Broomfield, Colorado, United States	
Loss	11–5	Scott Jorgensen	Submission (standing guillotine choke)	WEC 47	March 6, 2010	1	0:31	Columbus, Ohio, United States	
Win	11–4	John Hosman	Decision (unanimous)	WEC 45	December 19, 2009	3	5:00	Las Vegas, Nevada, United States	
Win	10–4	Alvin Cacdac	Decision (split)	Call to Arms I	May 16, 2009	3	5:00	Ontario, California, United States	
Win	9–4	Lonnie Wright	TKO (doctor stoppage)	Fist Series: WinterFist II 2008	November 23, 2008	3	1:26	Irvine, California, United States	
Win	8–4	Dan Sullivan	Submission (D'arce choke)	Freestyle Cage Fighting	October 4, 2009	1	3:03	Shawnee, Oklahoma, United States	
Win	7–4	Rick Screeton	Submission (armbar)	Valor Fighting: Fight Night	March 7, 2008	1	1:07	Tustin, California, United States	
Win	6–4	Rick Screeton	TKO (slam and punches)	Tuff-N-Uff: Thompson vs. Troyer	February 1, 2008	1	0:39	Las Vegas, Nevada, United States	
Loss	5–4	Matt Troyer	Decision (unanimous)	HOOKnSHOOT: Bodog Fight Women's Tournament	November 24, 2007	3	5:00	Evansville, Indiana, United States	
Win	5–3	Pete Sabala	Submission (armbar)	OctoberFist 2007: Fight Night on Fright Night	October 31, 2007	1	0:45	Orange County, California, United States	
Loss	4–3	Matteus Lahdesmaki	Submission (rear-naked choke)	Bodog Fight: Vancouver	August 25, 2007	1	2:59	Vancouver, British Columbia, Canada	
Loss	4–2	Todd Guimond	Technical Submission (rear-naked choke)	Total Fighting Alliance 6	April 28, 2007	3	1:31	Santa Monica, California, United States	
Win	4–1	Todd Guimond	Submission (rear-naked choke)	Total Fighting Alliance 5	February 24, 2007	1	1:43	Santa Monica, California, United States	
Loss	3–1	Todd Guimond	Submission (rear-naked choke)	Total Fighting Alliance 4	November 3, 2006	1	N/A	Carson, California, United States	
Win	3–0	Maurice Eazel	Submission (gullotine choke)	Total Fighting Alliance 3	August 19, 2006	2	1:14	Hollywood, California, United States	
Win	2–0	Daniel Barizia	TKO (doctor stoppage)	Total Fighting Alliance 2	April 7, 2006	N/A	N/A	Carson, California, United States	
Win	1–0	Daniel Vasquez	Submission (guillotine choke)	Total Combat 8	April 2, 2005	3	N/A	Tijuana, Mexico, Mexico	
