= WEC 51 =

WEC mixed martial arts event in 2010

WEC 51: Aldo vs. Gamburyan
- The poster for WEC 51: Aldo vs. Gamburyan
- Promotion: World Extreme Cagefighting
- Date: September 30, 2010
- Venue: 1stBank Center
- City: Broomfield, Colorado
- Attendance: 3,791
- Total gate: $191,620

Event chronology
WEC 50: Cruz vs. Benavidez 2	WEC 51: Aldo vs. Gamburyan	WEC 52: Faber vs. Mizugaki

WEC 51: Aldo vs. Gamburyan was a mixed martial arts event held by World Extreme Cagefighting that took place on September 30, 2010, at the 1stBank Center in Broomfield, Colorado. This was the only event that the WEC hosted in Colorado.

== Background ==
Alex Karalexis was expected to face debuting Chinese prospect Tiequan Zhang at this event, but was removed because of an injury and replaced by UFC veteran Jason Reinhardt. However, Reinhardt would also be forced from the card after failing a pre-fight eye exam, and was replaced by WEC newcomer Pablo Garza. The Zhang-Reinhardt matchup would later be rescheduled as a featherweight bout for UFC 127 following the UFC-WEC merger, with Zhang winning by submission.

Clint Godfrey was originally slated to face Demetrious Johnson at this event, but was pulled from the bout due to injury and replaced by WEC newcomer Nick Pace.

This event drew an average of 486,000 viewers on Versus.

== Results ==
Main card
Weight class				Method	Round	Time	Notes
Featherweight	José Aldo (c)	def	Manvel Gamburyan	KO (punches)	2	1:32	(Note: As part of the UFC-WEC merger, the WEC Featherweight Championship will become the UFC (Men's) Featherweight Championship.)
Lightweight	Donald Cerrone	def	Jamie Varner	Decision (unanimous) (30-27, 30-27, 30-27)	3	5:00
Bantamweight	Miguel Torres	def	Charlie Valencia	Submission (rear-naked choke)	2	2:25
Featherweight	George Roop	def	Chan Sung Jung	KO (head kick)	2	1:30
Featherweight	Mark Hominick	def	Leonard Garcia	Decision (split) (29-28, 28-29, 29-28)	3	5:00
Preliminary card
Featherweight	Mike Brown	def	Cole Province	TKO (punches)	1	1:18	(Note: This bout was aired on the live broadcast.)
Lightweight	Chris Horodecki	def	Ed Ratcliff	Decision (split) (28-29, 30–27, 30–27)	3	5:00
Bantamweight	Antonio Banuelos	def	Chad George	Decision (unanimous) (29-28, 30-27, 30-27)	3	5:00
Lightweight	Zhang Tiequan	def	Pablo Garza	Submission (guillotine choke)	1	2:26	(Note: This bout was aired on the live broadcast.)
Featherweight	Diego Nunes	def	Tyler Toner	Decision (unanimous) (29-28, 29-28, 30-27)	3	5:00
Bantamweight	Demetrious Johnson	def	Nick Pace	Decision (unanimous) (30-27, 30-27, 30-27)	3	5:00

== Bonus awards ==
Fighters were awarded $10,000 bonuses.

- Fight of the Night: (United States) Donald Cerrone vs. (United States) Jamie Varner
- Knockout of the Night: (United States) George Roop
- Submission of the Night: (United States) Miguel Torres

== See also ==
- World Extreme Cagefighting
- List of World Extreme Cagefighting champions
- List of WEC events
- 2010 in WEC
