= WEC 48 =

WEC MMA event in 2010

WEC 48: Aldo vs. Faber
- The poster for WEC 48: Aldo vs. Faber
- Promotion: World Extreme Cagefighting
- Date: April 24, 2010
- Venue: ARCO Arena
- City: Sacramento, California
- Attendance: 12,555
- Total gate: $954,635
- Buyrate: 175,000

Event chronology
WEC 47: Bowles vs. Cruz	WEC 48: Aldo vs. Faber	WEC 49: Varner vs. Shalorus

UFC Presents: Aldo vs. Faber, also referred to as WEC 48: Aldo vs. Faber was a mixed martial arts event held by World Extreme Cagefighting that took place on April 24, 2010 at ARCO Arena in Sacramento, California. This was WEC's first and only event on pay-per-view before their merger with the Ultimate Fighting Championship later that year.

== Background ==
The event was first announced by WEC President Reed Harris on the Dave and Mahoney Show.

Jamie Varner was expected to face Kamal Shalorus at this event, but that bout was called off due to an injury sustained by Shalorus. The match was later rescheduled for WEC 49 on June 20, where both men fought to a split draw.

A bout between Alex Karalexis and Zach Micklewright was due to take place at this event, but Micklewright suffered a broken ankle and was later replaced by Anthony Pettis.

Antonio Banuelos was scheduled to face Damacio Page at the event, but Page was forced off the card with an injury. Banuelos ending up facing Scott Jorgensen, in a rematch of their bout from WEC 41 which Banuelos won via split decision.

Cub Swanson was scheduled to face WEC newcomer Chan Sung Jung at this event, but Swanson was forced from the card with an injury. He was replaced by Leonard Garcia.

Mackens Semerzier was scheduled to face Anthony Morrison at this event, but Semerzier was forced from the card with an injury and was replaced by Chad Mendes.

Veteran UFC commentators Mike Goldberg and Joe Rogan handled broadcast duties for the event. Bruce Buffer handled the fighter introductions.

Two of the night's preliminary fights aired on Spike TV, marking the only time that Spike would air live WEC fights before their dissolution.

The advertising & live broadcasts for WEC 48 omitted virtually all references to the WEC brand, with the only exceptions being early versions of the poster, one mention during the broadcast by Joe Rogan, and the WEC logo on the championship belts themselves. During the broadcasts, the announcers referred only to "the organization" while the WEC logo was removed from the cage and the fighters' gloves.

== Results ==
Main card
Weight class				Method	Round	Time	Notes
Featherweight	José Aldo (c)	def.	Urijah Faber	Decision (unanimous) (50-45, 49-46, 49-45)	5	5:00	(Note: For the WEC Featherweight Championship.)
Lightweight	Benson Henderson (c)	def.	Donald Cerrone	Submission (guillotine choke)	1	1:57	(Note: For the WEC Lightweight Championship.)
Featherweight	Manvel Gamburyan	def.	Mike Brown	KO (punches)	1	2:22
Lightweight	Shane Roller	def.	Anthony Njokuani	Submission (rear-naked choke)	1	3:21
Bantamweight	Scott Jorgensen	def.	Antonio Banuelos	Decision (unanimous) (29-28, 29-28, 29-28)	3	5:00
Preliminary card (Spike)
Featherweight	Leonard Garcia	def.	Chan Sung Jung	Decision (split) (29-28, 28-29, 29-28)	3	5:00
Lightweight	Anthony Pettis	def.	Alex Karalexis	Submission (triangle choke)	2	1:35
Preliminary card
Bantamweight	Takeya Mizugaki	def.	Rani Yahya	Decision (unanimous) (29-28, 30-27, 29-28)	3	5:00
Featherweight	Chad Mendes	def.	Anthony Morrison	Submission (guillotine choke)	1	2:13	(Note: This bout aired on the Spike broadcast following the Karalexis vs. Pettis fight. This bout also aired on the PPV broadcast following the Visher vs. Toner fight.)
Bantamweight	Brad Pickett	def.	Demetrious Johnson	Decision (unanimous) (30-27, 30-27, 29-28)	3	5:00	(Note: This bout aired on the PPV broadcast following the Brown vs. Gamburyan fight.)
Featherweight	Tyler Toner	def.	Brandon Visher	TKO (elbows)	1	2:36	(Note: This bout aired on the PPV broadcast following the Henderson vs. Cerrone fight.)

== Bonus awards ==
Fighters were awarded $65,000 bonuses.

- Fight of the Night: Leonard Garcia vs.Chan Sung Jung
- Knockout of the Night: Manvel Gamburyan
- Submission of the Night: Benson Henderson

== Reported payout ==
The following is the reported payout to the fighters as reported to the California State Athletic Commission. It does not include sponsor money or "locker room" bonuses often given by the WEC and also do not include the WEC's traditional "fight night" bonuses.

- José Aldo: $40,000 (includes $20,000 win bonus) def. Urijah Faber: $28,000
- Benson Henderson: $26,000 ($13,000 win bonus) def. Donald Cerrone: $14,000
- Manvel Gamburyan: $36,000 ($18,000 win bonus) def. Mike Brown: $21,000
- Shane Roller: $28,000 ($14,000 win bonus) def. Anthony Njokuani: $7,000
- Scott Jorgensen: $21,000 ($10,500 win bonus) def. Antonio Banuelos: $7,000
- Leonard Garcia: $28,000 ($14,000 win bonus) def. Chan Sung Jung: $5,000
- Anthony Pettis: $8,000 ($4,000 win bonus) def. Alex Karalexis: $10,000
- Brad Pickett: $8,000 ($4,000 win bonus) def. Demetrious Johnson: $3,000
- Chad Mendes: $8,500 ($4,000 win bonus) def. Anthony Morrison: $4,000
- Takeya Mizugaki: $16,000 ($8,000 win bonus) def. Rani Yahya: $9,000
- Tyler Toner: $5,000 ($2,000 win bonus) def. Brandon Visher: $4,000

== See also ==
- World Extreme Cagefighting
- List of World Extreme Cagefighting champions
- List of WEC events
- 2010 in WEC
