= Leonard Garcia =

American mixed martial arts fighter

- Born: July 14, 1979 (age 47); Plainview, Texas, United States
- Other names: Bad Boy
- Height: 5 ft 9 in (1.75 m)
- Weight: 145 lb (66 kg; 10.4 st)
- Division: Featherweight; Lightweight
- Reach: 69 1/2 in (177 cm)
- Fighting out of: Lubbock, Texas, United States
- Team: Jackson's Submission Fighting, Team Alpha Male
- Rank: Brown belt in Brazilian Jiu-Jitsu
- Years active: 1999–2014

Professional boxing record
- Total: 1
- Wins: 0
- By knockout: 0
- Losses: 1
- By knockout: 1

Mixed martial arts record
- Total: 32
- Wins: 18
- By knockout: 5
- By submission: 10
- By decision: 3
- Losses: 13
- By submission: 4
- By decision: 9
- Draws: 1

Other information
- Boxing record from BoxRec
- Mixed martial arts record from Sherdog

Leonard Garcia (born July 14, 1979) is an American former mixed martial artist and professional boxer who last competed in the Featherweight division of the Legacy Fighting Championship, and is the former Legacy FC Featherweight Champion. After making his professional debut in 1999, Garcia competed in WEC and the UFC.

== Background ==
Garcia was born and raised in Plainview, Texas. His mother gave birth to him when she was only 17 years old, and doctors had to inject steroids into Garcia's lungs because of a rare illness. Garcia was raised in his grandparents' home, who had a farm and, along with his uncles, helped raise the young Garcia. Garcia later attended Plainview High School, where he was a talented football player and had also been involved in martial arts and boxing. Garcia had been planning to walk-on to the Texas Tech football team, when he was involved in a physical altercation with a recently released felon at a local restaurant. The man had a knife and stabbed Garcia eight times, twice puncturing his lungs, causing them to collapse. Had it not been for the steroid injections when he was an infant, Garcia believes that he would have died. Not long after the incident Garcia, who would not be able to continue his football career because of his wounds, found a dojo and found his new passion in fighting.

== Mixed martial arts career ==
=== Early career ===
Garcia began his career in 1999, competing on the regional circuit in the Western United States. Garcia competed in the first WEC event back in 2001 at WEC 1. After compiling an impressive 8–1 beginning to his professional career, Garcia took a three-year hiatus from competition.

Returning to action in 2006, Garcia was tabbed as a short notice replacement against high ranking contender Roger Huerta at UFC 69 where he lost a very one-sided unanimous decision.

Garcia then defeated Allen Berube by submission at The Ultimate Fighter 5 Finale. In his next bout Garcia lost via decision to Cole Miller at UFC Fight Night 11. After going 1–2 with the UFC, Garcia was released from his contract.

=== World Extreme Cagefighting ===
Garcia defeated Hiroyuki Takaya via first-round knockout at WEC 32. In his next fight, Leonard knocked out former undisputed UFC Lightweight Champion, Jens Pulver 72 seconds into the first round at WEC 36.

On March 1, 2009, Garcia lost the WEC Featherweight Championship match against champion Mike Brown. Brown landed a huge overhand right, knocking Garcia down in the first 30 seconds of the fight, landed some ground and pound, and then secured a fight-ending arm-triangle choke submission.

Garcia defeated Jameel Massouh via a controversial split decision on August 9, 2009, at WEC 42.

In his next fight, Garcia lost to Manvel Gamburyan on November 18, 2009, at WEC 44 via unanimous decision.

Garcia was expected to face Diego Nunes on March 6, 2010, at WEC 47, but Nunes was forced from the card with an injury. Garcia instead faced former UFC fighter George Roop with the bout ending in a split draw.

Garcia faced WEC newcomer Chan Sung Jung on April 24, 2010, at WEC 48. Garcia replaced Cub Swanson who was forced from the card with an injury. The fight went the full three rounds and Garcia won in a controversial split decision. The fight won Fight of the Night honors, being hailed by UFC matchmaker Joe Silva and announcer Joe Rogan as "the best fight I've seen in my life."

Garcia faced Mark Hominick on September 30, 2010, at WEC 51. He lost the fight via split decision.

=== Ultimate Fighting Championship ===
In October 2010, World Extreme Cagefighting merged with the Ultimate Fighting Championship. As part of the merger, all WECfighters were transferred to the UFC. Now managed by VFD Marketing, Garcia was expected to face Tyler Toner at The Ultimate 12 Finale, but Garcia was pulled from the bout with Toner in favor of a bout with Nam Phan. Garcia won the fight via a controversial split decision. Garcia and Phan received Fight of the Night honors for their performances. This was the first televised featherweight bout in the UFC.

A rematch with Phan was expected on March 26, 2011, at UFC Fight Night 24. However, Phan was forced out of the bout with an injury and replaced by Chan Sung Jung. Garcia lost to Jung in the second round, falling victim to the first twister submission in UFC history.

Garcia was expected to face The Ultimate Fighter 12 alumni Alex Caceres on August 14, 2011, at UFC on Versus 5. However, Garcia was forced out of the bout with an injury and replaced by Jimy Hettes.

Garcia fought Nam Phan in a rematch UFC 136. Garcia lost via unanimous decision in a fight that earned Fight of the Night honors.

Garcia was expected to face Zhang Tie Quan on February 26, 2012, at UFC 144. However, Garcia was forced out of the bout with an injury and replaced by promotional newcomer Issei Tamura.

Garcia fought Matt Grice on June 8, 2012, at UFC on FX 3. Garcia lost the bout via unanimous decision (30-27, 30–27, 30–27).

Garcia was expected to face Cody McKenzie on December 29, 2012, at UFC 155. However, McKenzie was forced out of the bout with an injury and was replaced by Max Holloway. Garcia lost the fight via a controversial split decision. While no official statement has been made by the UFC, Dana White said in his post fight interview after the UFC 155 press conference, that the UFC loves the fighters that lay it all out on the line.

The bout with Cody McKenzie was rescheduled for April 27, 2013 at UFC 159. Garcia lost the bout via unanimous decision and was subsequently released from the promotion.

=== Legacy Fighting Championship ===
After being released by the UFC Garcia left Jackson's Submission Fighting and joined Urijah Faber's Team Alpha Male.

On May 11, 2013, Garcia signed a three-fight deal with Legacy Fighting Championship, a promotion based out of Texas. Garcia faced Rey Trujillo at Legacy FC 21 on July 19, 2013, He snapped his five-fight losing streak winning via KO due to a head kick and punches in the third round.

Garcia faced Nick Gonzalez at Legacy FC 23 on September 13, 2013. He won the fight via rear-naked choke submission in the first round.

On September 24, 2013, it was announced Garcia would face Kevin Aguilar for the Legacy FC Featherweight Championship on December 6, 2013, at Legacy FC 26. He won the fight via knockout in the first round to win the Legacy FC Featherweight Championship.

Garcia was expected to face Shane Howell for the Legacy FC Featherweight Championship at Legacy FC 29 on March 21, 2014, however, Howell fell ill hours before the event and the fight was pulled from the card.

In his first title defense, Garcia faced undefeated Damon Jackson at Legacy FC 33 on July 18, 2014. He lost the fight via arm-triangle choke submission.

Garcia faced Daniel Pineda on November 14, 2014, at Legacy FC 37. He lost the fight via submission in the first round and announced his retirement at the event after this loss.

== Bare-knuckle boxing ==
Garcia first appeared in bare knuckle at BKFC 4 where he won the lightweight title by defeating Julian Lane by 2nd-round TKO. Garcia later faced Jim Alers in a bare-knuckle boxing match at BKFC 7 on August 10, 2019, losing by technical knockout in the first round.

On March 16, 2021, in Biloxi, MS, Garcia headlined BKFC 16 opposite Joe Elmore. The two fighters went the distance in an exciting 5 round battle. Garcia won via unanimous decision. After the fight, which was the last of a three bout contract, Garcia retired in front of the Biloxi Civic Center crowd.

== Personal life ==
In March 2008, Garcia was arrested as part of an alleged cocaine ring, which put his career on hold. According to Garcia, "I had a buddy, a really good friend of mine in Lubbock, and he was into things that weren't good," he said. "I knew about what the guy was up to but he was a friend of mine. The law says even if he's your friend, you are required to report on the guy. The other 11 guys, I didn't know any of them." Three months later, he was exonerated.

In 1997, his sister Angelica, was killed in a car accident involving a drunk driver. Afterwards, Garcia limited his own drinking.

Garcia proposed to his girlfriend on March 21, 2014.

== Championships and accomplishments ==
- Unified Shoot Wrestling Federation
  - USWF World Lightweight Championship (One time)
- Ring of Fire
  - ROF 2 Lightweight Tournament Champion
  - ROF Lightweight Championship (One time)
- Legacy Fighting Championship
  - Legacy FC Featherweight Championship (One time)
- Ultimate Fighting Championship
  - Fight of the Night (Four times) vs. Roger Huerta, Cole Miller and Nam Phan (x2)
  - UFC.com Awards
    - 2007: Ranked #8 Fight of the Year vs. Roger Huerta
- World Extreme Cagefighting
  - Fight of the Night (Two times) vs. George Roop and Jung Chan-sung
  - Knockout of the Night (One time) vs. Jens Pulver
- Wrestling Observer Newsletter
  - Fight of the Year (2010) vs. Chan Sung Jung

== Mixed martial arts record ==
Professional record breakdown
32 matches	18 wins	13 losses
By knockout	5	0
By submission	10	4
By decision	3	9
Draws	1	

Res.	Record	Opponent	Method	Event	Date	Round	Time	Location	Notes
Loss	18–13–1	Daniel Pineda	Submission (kimura)	Legacy FC 37	November 14, 2014	1	1:54	Houston, Texas, United States	
Loss	18–12–1	Damon Jackson	Submission (arm-triangle choke)	Legacy FC 33	July 18, 2014	1	1:32	Dallas, Texas, United States	Lost the Legacy FC Featherweight Championship.
Win	18–11–1	Kevin Aguilar	KO (punches)	Legacy FC 26	December 6, 2013	1	2:57	San Antonio, Texas, United States	Won the Legacy FC Featherweight Championship.
Win	17–11–1	Nick Gonzalez	Submission (rear-naked choke)	Legacy FC 23	September 13, 2013	3	4:43	San Antonio, Texas, United States	
Win	16–11–1	Rey Trujillo	KO (head kick and punches)	Legacy FC 21	July 19, 2013	3	0:24	Houston, Texas, United States	
Loss	15–11–1	Cody McKenzie	Decision (unanimous)	UFC 159	April 27, 2013	3	5:00	Newark, New Jersey, United States	
Loss	15–10–1	Max Holloway	Decision (split)	UFC 155	December 29, 2012	3	5:00	Las Vegas, Nevada, United States	
Loss	15–9–1	Matt Grice	Decision (unanimous)	UFC on FX: Johnson vs. McCall	June 8, 2012	3	5:00	Sunrise, Florida, United States	
Loss	15–8–1	Nam Phan	Decision (unanimous)	UFC 136	October 8, 2011	3	5:00	Houston, Texas, United States	Fight of the Night.
Loss	15–7–1	Jung Chan-sung	Submission (twister)	UFC Fight Night: Nogueira vs. Davis	March 26, 2011	2	4:59	Seattle, Washington, United States	
Win	15–6–1	Nam Phan	Decision (split)	The Ultimate Fighter: Team GSP vs. Team Koscheck Finale	December 4, 2010	3	5:00	Las Vegas, Nevada, United States	Fight of the Night.
Loss	14–6–1	Mark Hominick	Decision (split)	WEC 51	September 30, 2010	3	5:00	Broomfield, Colorado, United States	
Win	14–5–1	Jung Chan-sung	Decision (split)	WEC 48	April 24, 2010	3	5:00	Sacramento, California, United States	Fight of the Night.
Draw	13–5–1	George Roop	Draw (split)	WEC 47	March 6, 2010	3	5:00	Columbus, Ohio, United States	Fight of the Night.
Loss	13–5	Manvel Gamburyan	Decision (unanimous)	WEC 44	November 18, 2009	3	5:00	Las Vegas, Nevada, United States	
Win	13–4	Jameel Massouh	Decision (split)	WEC 42	August 9, 2009	3	5:00	Las Vegas, Nevada, United States	
Loss	12–4	Mike Brown	Submission (arm-triangle choke)	WEC 39	March 1, 2009	1	1:57	Corpus Christi, Texas, United States	For the WEC Featherweight Championship.
Win	12–3	Jens Pulver	TKO (punches)	WEC 36: Faber vs. Brown	November 5, 2008	1	1:12	Hollywood, Florida, United States	Knockout of the Night.
Win	11–3	Hiroyuki Takaya	KO (punch)	WEC 32: Condit vs. Prater	February 13, 2008	1	1:31	Rio Rancho, New Mexico, United States	Featherweight debut.
Loss	10–3	Cole Miller	Decision (unanimous)	UFC Fight Night: Thomas vs Florian	September 19, 2007	3	5:00	Las Vegas, Nevada, United States	Fight of the Night.
Win	10–2	Allen Berube	Submission (rear-naked choke)	The Ultimate Fighter 5 Finale	June 23, 2007	1	4:22	Las Vegas, Nevada, United States	
Loss	9–2	Roger Huerta	Decision (unanimous)	UFC 69	April 7, 2007	3	5:00	Houston, Texas, United States	Fight of the Night.
Win	9–1	Rocky Johnson	Submission (rear-naked choke)	ROF 23: Impact	April 1, 2006	1	4:58	Castle Rock, Colorado, United States	
Win	8–1	Justin James	Submission (rear-naked choke)	ROF 7: Meltdown	March 28, 2003	1	2:28	Denver, Colorado, United States	Defended the ROF Lightweight Championship.
Win	7–1	Steve Horton	Submission (armbar)	ROF 4: Warriors	March 15, 2002	1	0:33	Denver, Colorado, United States	Won the ROF Lightweight Championship.
Win	6–1	Víctor Estrada	KO (head kick)	WEC 1	June 30, 2001	2	0:54	Lemoore, California, United States	
Win	5–1	Jake Hattan	Submission (guillotine choke)	ROF 2: Trial By Fire	February 10, 2001	2	1:46	Denver, Colorado, United States	Won the ROF 2 Lightweight Tournament.
Win	4–1	Shawn Simpson	Submission (triangle choke)	ROF 2: Trial By Fire	February 10, 2001	1	0:32	Denver, Colorado, United States	
Win	3–1	Brent Medley	Submission (triangle choke)	Unified Shoot Wrestling Federation 18	November 25, 2000	1	3:59	Amarillo, Texas, United States	Won the USWF World Lightweight Championship.
Win	2–1	Puma Green	Submission (armbar)	Ring of Fire 1	March 18, 2000	1	2:15	Denver, Colorado, United States	
Loss	1–1	Brent Medley	Decision	Unified Shoot Wrestling Federation 15	May 1, 1999	1	20:00	Dumas, Texas, United States	
Win	1–0	Chris Cantrell	Submission (armbar)	Unified Shoot Wrestling Federation 15	May 1, 1999	1	1:28	Dumas, Texas, United States	

== Professional boxing record ==
1 fight	0 wins	1 loss
By knockout	0	1
By decision	0	0

No.	Result	Record	Opponent	Method	Round, time	Date	Location	Notes
1	Loss	0–1	(Mexico) Miguel Ortiz	TKO	3 (4), 1:45	Nov 26, 2005	(United States) Music Hall, Austin, Texas	Professional debut

== Bare knuckle record ==
Professional record breakdown
3 matches	2 wins	1 loss
By knockout	1	1
By decision	1	0

Res.	Record	Opponent	Method	Event	Date	Round	Time	Location	Notes
Win	2–1	Joe Elmore	Decision (unanimous)	BKFC 16	March 16, 2021	5	2:00	Biloxi, Mississippi, United States	Retired from combat sports post-bout.
Loss	1-1	Jim Alers	TKO (punches)	BKFC 7	August 10, 2019	1	1:38	Biloxi, Mississippi, United States	
Win	1-0	Julian Lane	TKO (punches)	BKFC 4	February 2, 2019	2	N/A	Cancun, Mexico	

== See also ==
- List of mixed martial artists with professional boxing records
