= Doug Evans (fighter) =

American mixed martial arts fighter

Douglas Evans
- Born: October 10, 1980 (age 46); Anchorage, Alaska, U.S.
- Height: 5 ft 9 in (1.75 m)
- Weight: 155 lb (70 kg; 11.1 st)
- Division: Featherweight; Lightweight
- Stance: Orthodox
- Team: AK Wolfpack/ABJJ

Mixed martial arts record
- Total: 24
- Wins: 13
- By knockout: 2
- By submission: 8
- By decision: 3
- Losses: 11
- By knockout: 3
- By submission: 5
- By decision: 3

Other information
- Mixed martial arts record from Sherdog

Douglas Evans (born October 10, 1980) is an American former Featherweight mixed martial artist. In July 2001, Evans took part in the delegation of three American fighters invited to Myanmar for the first time to compete under Lethwei rules.

== Career ==
=== Mixed martial arts career ===
Evans became a 7-time Alaska State Freestyle and Greco-Roman champion in amateur wrestling competition.

Evans wrestled in high school for Bartlett High School in Anchorage. As a freshman, he won a region championship and placed 4th at the 4A State Championships. As a junior, he was a region runner-up and again placed 4th at the state meet.

Evans made his professional MMA debut in February 1999. He quickly established an impressive 6-1 record while fighting in his native Alaska and one fight in California. This drew the attention of the Ultimate Fighting Championship and he was signed with the company in 2007.

==== Ultimate Fighting Championship ====
Evans made his UFC debut in June 2007, fighting Roger Huerta at The Ultimate Fighter 5 Finale. He lost the fight via TKO.

In his second UFC fight, Evans faced Mark Bocek at UFC 79. He lost the fight via unanimous decision and was subsequently released from the promotion.

=== Lethwei ===
In June 2001, twelve years after Burma changed its name to Myanmar, the first international event took place in Yangon with professional fighters from the United States facing Burmese fighters under full traditional Lethwei rules. The delegation of three American fighters brought by the IKF were Evans, Shannon Ritch, and Albert Ramirez. Evans was matched against Lethwei World Champion Wan Chai at theInternational Myanmar traditional boxing challenge & Myanmar-Australia talent testing boxing competition in Yangon, Myanmar. In the first round, Evans was dropped to the floor with a knee strike to the lower abdomen while clinching and lost by referee stoppage (TKO). Evans later claimed he was kneed in the groin by Wan Chai, however the official did not see the strike and result remained. All three Americans lost to the Burmese.

== Championships and accomplishments ==
- Shark Fights
  - Shark Fights Featherweight Championship (One time)
- Sherdog's 2009 Round of the Year vs. Thierry Quenneville at XMMA 7 - Inferno
- Part of the first three Americans to compete in Myanmar

== Lethwei record ==
Professional Lethwei record
0 wins (0 (T)KOs), 1 loss, 0 draws
Date	Result	Opponent	Event	Location	Method	Round	Time
2001-06-09	Loss	(Myanmar) Wan Chai	International Challenge Fights, Thuwunna NIS(1)	Yangon, Myanmar	TKO	1	
Legend: Win Loss Draw/No contest Notes

== Mixed martial arts record ==
Professional record breakdown
24 matches	13 wins	11 losses
By knockout	2	3
By submission	8	5
By decision	3	3

Res.	Record	Opponent	Method	Event	Date	Round	Time	Location	Notes
Loss	13–11	Alexandre Bezerra	Submission (ankle lock)	Bellator 57	November 12, 2011	1	4:04	Rama, Ontario, Canada	
Loss	13–10	Antonio Carvalho	Decision (unanimous)	Score Fighting Series	June 10, 2011	3	5:00	Ontario, Canada	
Loss	13–9	Alexander Sarnavskiy	Submission (triangle choke)	ProFC - Mayor's Cup 2011	May 7, 2011	1	2:40	Khabarovsk, Russia	
Win	13–8	Maurice Mitchell	Submission (rear-naked choke)	Alaska Fighting Championship 79 - Champions	January 12, 2011	1	1:32	Anchorage, Alaska, United States	
Win	12–8	Tristan Johnson	Submission (rear-naked choke)	W-1 New Ground	October 23, 2010	3	1:55	Nova Scotia, Canada	
Loss	11–8	Ronnie Mann	Decision (split)	Shark Fights 13: Jardine vs Prangley	September 11, 2010	5	5:00	Amarillo, Texas, United States	Lost Shark Fights Featherweight Championship.
Win	11–7	Dustin Phillips	Submission (heel hook)	Shark Fights 9: Phillips vs Evans	March 20, 2010	1	2:25	Amarillo, Texas, United States	Defended Shark Fights Featherweight Championship.
Loss	10–7	Ian Loveland	KO (head kick)	Fitetime Entertainment - Arctic Combat	January 16, 2010	5	0:09	Fairbanks, Alaska, United States	
Win	10–6	Jesse Kueber	TKO (punches)	AFC 66 - Alaska Fighting Championship	December 15, 2009	1	2:08	Anchorage, Alaska, United States	
Win	9–6	Douglas Frey	Submission (guillotine choke)	Shark Fights 5.5: Nothing To Lose	July 18, 2009	2	1:46	Amarillo, Texas, United States	Won Shark Fights Featherweight Championship.
Win	8–6	Joel Nettles	Submission (ankle lock)	AFC 58 - Veterans Collide	April 8, 2009	2	2:52	Anchorage, Alaska, United States	
Loss	7–6	Thierry Quenneville	Submission (armbar)	XMMA 7 - Inferno	February 27, 2009	2	1:48	Quebec, Canada	
Win	7–5	Jared Lopez	Submission (armbar)	Shark Fights 1	October 24, 2008	1	1:09	Amarillo, Texas, United States	
Loss	6–5	Kajan Johnson	Submission (rear-naked choke)	Raw Combat - Resurrection	June 20, 2008	2	0:57	Alberta, Canada	
Loss	6–4	Bao Quach	TKO (punches)	ShoXC: Elite Challenger Series	April 5, 2008	1	0:55	Friant, California, United States	
Loss	6–3	Mark Bocek	Decision (unanimous)	UFC 79	December 29, 2007	3	5:00	Las Vegas, Nevada, United States	
Loss	6–2	Roger Huerta	TKO (punches)	The Ultimate Fighter 5 Finale	June 23, 2007	2	3:30	Las Vegas, Nevada, United States	
Win	6–1	Mike Joy	Decision (unanimous)	AFC 35 - Alaska Fighting Championship	May 9, 2007	3	5:00	Anchorage, Alaska, United States	
Win	5–1	Gary D'Hue	TKO (punches)	AFC 33 - Alaska Fighting Championship	March 7, 2007	2	2:46	Anchorage, Alaska, United States	
Win	4–1	Jimmy Miller	Decision (unanimous)	PFC - Peninsula Fight Challenge 8	February 2, 2007	3	3:00	Soldotna, Alaska, United States	
Win	3–1	Josh Branham	Submission (strikes)	AFC 30 - Alaska Fighting Championship	December 7, 2006	1	2:10	Anchorage, Alaska, United States	
Win	2–1	Jesse Brock	Decision (unanimous)	AFC 25 - Alaska Fighting Championship	July 12, 2006	3	5:00	Anchorage, Alaska, United States	
Win	1–1	Gary McElwain	Submission (rear-naked choke)	AFC 23 - Alaska Fighting Championship	May 17, 2006	1	1:55	Anchorage, Alaska, United States	
Loss	0–1	Tiki Ghosn	Submission (guillotine choke)	West Coast NHB Championships 2	February 28, 1999	1	N/A	Compton, California, United States	
