= Jason Sampson =

American mixed martial artist (born 1982)

- Born: February 21, 1982 (age 44); Dallas, Texas, U.S.
- Other names: Wild Thing
- Height: 5 ft 8 in (1.73 m)
- Weight: 135 lb (61 kg; 9.6 st)
- Division: Flyweight; Bantamweight (formerly)
- Reach: 66.0 in (168 cm)
- Fighting out of: Dallas, Texas, United States
- Team: Octagon MMA and Carlos Machado Jiu-Jitsu
- Rank: 2nd Degree Black Belt in Brazilian Jiu-Jitsu
- Years active: 2009–present

Mixed martial arts record
- Total: 13
- Wins: 12
- By knockout: 3
- By submission: 7
- By decision: 2
- Losses: 1
- By decision: 1

Other information
- Mixed martial arts record from Sherdog

Jason Sampson (born February 21, 1982) is an American professional mixed martial artist currently competing in the flyweight division of Legacy FC. A professional competitor since 2009, Sampson has previously competed in Bellator and Shark Fights.

== Background ==
Born and raised in Dallas, Texas, Sampson, along with his two brothers, competed in wrestling. Sampson began wrestling at the age of 12 and wrestled at MacArthur High School. Sampson was talented, earning three state titles, and continued his wrestling career at The Apprentice School in Newport News, Virginia, where he earned NCWA All-American honors. Sampson was involved in a freak accident during his collegiate career in which his opponent broke his neck and became paralyzed, despite Sampson using a legal move. Sampson was heavily affected by the incident and the school received a lawsuit, which was later dismissed. Sampson then began training in Brazilian jiu-jitsu before transitioning into mixed martial arts.

== Mixed martial arts career ==
=== Early career ===
After going 9–1 as an amateur, Sampson made his professional debut on November 28, 2009, winning via submission in the first round. Sampson would then compile a record of 8–1 before making his Bellator debut.

=== Bellator ===
Sampson made his Bellator debut against Jeremy Myers on March 16, 2012 at Bellator 61. Sampson won the fight via rear-naked choke submission in the third round.

Sampson faced Chris Pham on January 24, 2013 at Bellator 86. He won the fight via armbar submission in the third round.

Sampson faced Danny Sykora at Bellator 128 on October 10, 2014. He won the fight via unanimous decision.

=== Legacy Fighting Championship ===
Sampson made his flyweight debut against former UFC competitor Joseph Sandoval at Legacy FC 38 on February 13, 2015. He won the fight via TKO due to punches in the first round.

== Mixed martial arts record ==
Professional record breakdown
| 13 matches | 12 wins | 1 loss |
| By knockout | 3 | 0 |
| By submission | 7 | 0 |
| By decision | 2 | 1 |

| Res. | Record | Opponent | Method | Event | Date | Round | Time | Location | Notes |
|---|---|---|---|---|---|---|---|---|---|
| Win | 12–1 | Joseph Sandoval | TKO (punches) | Legacy FC 38 | February 13, 2015 | 1 | 1:36 | Allen, Texas, United States | Flyweight debut. |
| Win | 11–1 | Danny Sykora | Decision (unanimous) | Bellator 128 | October 10, 2014 | 3 | 5:00 | Thackerville, Oklahoma, United States | |
| Win | 10–1 | Chris Pham | Submission (armbar) | Bellator 86 | January 24, 2013 | 3 | 4:55 | Thackerville, Oklahoma, United States | Catchweight (140 lbs) bout. |
| Win | 9–1 | Jeremy Myers | Submission (rear-naked choke) | Bellator 61 | March 16, 2012 | 3 | 2:25 | Bossier City, Louisiana, United States | Catchweight (140 lbs) bout. |
| Loss | 8–1 | Joshua Montoya | Decision (split) | Fight Game: Premier Event | December 2, 2011 | 3 | 5:00 | Frisco, Texas, United States | |
| Win | 8–0 | Joshua Montoya | Submission (armbar) | MMA Fight Pit: Genesis | August 13, 2011 | 1 | 2:38 | Albuquerque, New Mexico, United States | |
| Win | 7–0 | Randy Villarreal | TKO (punches) | Undisputed MMA 1 | June 18, 2011 | 2 | 0:14 | Amarillo, Texas, United States | |
| Win | 6–0 | Erik Perez | Decision (split) | STFC 12: Tuff Enough | September 3, 2010 | 3 | 3:00 | Mcallen, Texas, United States | |
| Win | 5–0 | Shane Howell | Submission | Bricktown Brawl 5 | June 25, 2010 | 1 | 4:14 | Oklahoma City, Oklahoma, United States | |
| Win | 4–0 | Jeremiah Castillo | TKO (punches) | Shark Fights 11: Humes vs Buentello | May 22, 2010 | 1 | 1:33 | Odessa, Texas, United States | |
| Win | 3–0 | Jeremy Valderaz | Submission (armbar) | Shark Fights 9: Phillips vs Evans | March 20, 2010 | 1 | 2:50 | Amarillo, Texas, United States | |
| Win | 2–0 | Larry Garcia | Submission (armbar) | KOK 8: The Uprising | February 27, 2010 | 1 | 1:03 | Austin, Texas, United States | |
| Win | 1–0 | Nate Garza | Submission (rear-naked choke) | SWC 9: Redemption | November 28, 2009 | 1 | 1:25 | Frisco, Texas, United States | |
