= 2011 in Shark Fights =

Mixed martial arts events

Information
- First date: March 11, 2011
- Last date: November 11, 2011

Events
- Total events: 8

Fights
- Total fights: 78

Chronology
| 2010 in Shark Fights | 2011 in Shark Fights |

The year 2011 is the fourth and last year in the history of Shark Fights, a mixed martial arts promotion based in the United States. In 2011 Shark Fights held 6 events beginning with, Shark Fights 14: Horwich vs. Villefort.

== Events list ==
| # | Event title | Date | Arena | Location | Notes |
|---|---|---|---|---|---|
| 21 | Shark Fights 21: Knothe vs. Lashley | November 11, 2011 | Fair Park Coliseum | Lubbock, Texas | |
| 20 | Shark Fights 20 | October 15, 2011 | Edgewater Casino Resort | Laughlin, Nevada | |
| 19 | Shark Fights 19 | September 10, 2011 | Independence Events Center | Independence, Missouri | |
| 18 | Shark Fights 18 | August 19, 2011 | John Ascuaga's Nugget Casino Resort | Sparks, Nevada | |
| 17 | Shark Fights 17: Horwich vs. Rosholt 2 | July 15, 2011 | Dr Pepper Arena | Frisco, Texas | |
| 16 | Shark Fights 16: Neer vs. Juarez | June 25, 2011 | Ector County Coliseum | Odessa, Texas | |
| 15 | Shark Fights 15: Villaseñor vs Camozzi | May 27, 2011 | Santa Ana Star Center | Rio Rancho, New Mexico | First event outside of Texas, First Event for Fuel TV |
| 14 | Shark Fights 14: Horwich vs. Villefort | March 11, 2011 | Fair Park Coliseum | Lubbock, Texas | First Live Event on HDNet |

== Shark Fights 14: Horwich vs. Villefort ==
Shark Fights 14: Horwich vs. Villefort was held on March 11, 2011 at the Fair Park Coliseum in Lubbock, Texas.

=== Results ===
Main Card
| Weight class | | | | Method | Round | Time | Notes |
|---|---|---|---|---|---|---|---|
| | Danillo Villefort | def. | Matt Horwich | Decision (Unanimous) | 3 | 5:00 |
| | Tara LaRosa | def. | Carina Damm | Submission (Inverted Heel Hook) | 2 | 0:28 |
| | Mike Bronzoulis | def. | Lucas Lopes | Decision (Unanimous) | 3 | 5:00 |
| | Eric Davila | def. | Alex Cisne | TKO (Punches) | 3 | 1:03 |
| | Gabriel Vasquez | def. | Layne Hernandez | Technical Submission (Guillotine Choke) | 3 | 1:29 |
| | Joseph Sandoval | def. | Sean Shakour | Decision (Unanimous) | 3 | 3:00 |
| | Quaint Kempf | def. | Donnie Frye | Submission (Rear-Naked Choke) | 1 | 2:48 |
| | Derek Cansino | def. | Larry Garcia | Decision (Unanimous) | 3 | 3:00 |
| | Ryan Benoit | def. | Matt Espinoza | TKO (Punches) | 2 | 1:14 |
| | Matt Dodgen | def. | Gino Davila | Decision (Unanimous) | 3 | 3:00 |
| | Mark Martinez | def. | Jonathan Valencia | Submission (Guillotine Choke) | 1 | 0:23 |
| | Cesar Rodriguez Jr. | def. | Tommy Gomez | Submission (Armbar) | 1 | 0:34 |
| | Matt Hobar | def. | Jeremy Gauna | Submission (Rear-Naked Choke) | 2 | 2:16 |

== Shark Fights 15: Villaseñor vs Camozzi ==
Shark Fights 15: Villaseñor vs Camozzi was held on May 27, 2011 at the Santa Ana Star Center in Rio Rancho, New Mexico.

=== Results ===
Main Card
| Weight class | | | | Method | Round | Time | Notes |
|---|---|---|---|---|---|---|---|
| | Chris Camozzi | def. | Joey Villasenor | Decision (Split) | 3 | 5:00 |
| | David Branch | def. | Jeremy May | TKO (Punches) | 3 | 3:19 |
| | Federico Lopez | def. | Bobby Huron | Decision (Unanimous) | 3 | 5:00 |
| | Artenas Young | def. | Kyle Bracey | TKO (Punches) | 1 | 4:04 |
| | Frank Gomez | def. | Tim Snyder | Submission (Rear-Naked Choke) | 1 | 3:19 |
| | Lionel Lanham | def. | Eric McElroy | TKO (Punches) | 1 | 0:14 |
| | Russell Wilson | def. | Robbie Gutierrez | Decision (Split) | 3 | 3:00 |
| | Freddie Crosby | def. | Kasey Yates | TKO (Punches) | 1 | 1:11 |
| | Adam Gonzales | def. | Zachary Hynes | Submission (North-South Choke) | 2 | 2:38 |
| | Edgar Lopez | def. | Derek Perez | TKO (Punches) | 1 | 2:22 |
| | Randy Ray Sanchez | def. | Armando Mendibles | Decision (Split) | 3 | 3:00 |

== Shark Fights 16: Neer vs. Juarez ==
Shark Fights 16: Neer vs. Juarez was held on June 25, 2011 at the Ector County Coliseum in Odessa, Texas.

=== Results ===
Main Card
| Weight class | | | | Method | Round | Time | Notes |
|---|---|---|---|---|---|---|---|
| | Donnie Frye | def. | Alfredo Herrera | TKO (Punches) | 1 | 1:44 |
| | Josh Neer | def. | Jesse Juarez | TKO (Injury) | 1 | 5:00 |
| | Artenas Young | def. | Elvis Mutapčić | Decision (Unanimous) | 3 | 5:00 |
| | Anselmo Luna | def. | Danny Salinas | Submission (Guillotine Choke) | 3 | 2:52 |
| | Jared Downing | def. | Ran Weathers | KO (Punches) | 1 | 1:38 |
| | Isaias Martinez | def. | Rey Trujillo | Submission (Armbar) | 1 | 1:05 |
| | Joseph Sandoval | def. | Randy Hinds | Submission (Punches) | 2 | 1:05 |
| | Jarrett Jones | def. | James Chandler | Submission (Triangle Choke) | 2 | 1:05 |
| | Candido Andazola | def. | Desmond Hill | Decision (Split) | 3 | 5:00 |
| | Miguel Feliciano | def. | Mark Daniels | TKO (Punches) | 1 | 0:55 |

== Shark Fights 17: Horwich vs. Rosholt 2 ==
Shark Fights 17: Horwich vs. Rosholt 2 was an event held on July 15, 2011 at the Dr Pepper Arena in Frisco, Texas.

=== Results ===
Main Card
| Weight class | | | | Method | Round | Time | Notes |
|---|---|---|---|---|---|---|---|
| | Jake Rosholt | def. | Matt Horwich | Decision (Unanimous) | 3 | 5:00 |
| | Ricco Rodriguez | def. | Doug Williams | Submission (Rear-Naked Choke) | 1 | 2:16 |
| | Emanuel Newton | def. | Ilir Latifi | Decision (Unanimous) | 3 | 5:00 |
| | Erik Pérez | def. | Douglas Frey | Decision (Unanimous) | 3 | 5:00 |
| | Alan Jouban | def. | Andrew Goldthwaite | KO (Punches) | 3 | 2:37 |
| | Russell Brewer | def. | Gabriel Vasquez | TKO (Punches) | 3 | 1:05 |
| | Victor Hernandez | def. | Quaint Kempf | Submission (Armbar) | 1 | 1:06 |
| | Matt Hobar | def. | Jay Flores | Submission (Rear-Naked Choke) | 1 | 1:55 |

== Shark Fights 18 ==
Shark Fights 18 was an event held on August 19, 2011 at John Ascuaga's Nugget Casino Resort in Sparks, Nevada.

=== Results ===
Main Card
| Weight class | | | | Method | Round | Time | Notes |
|---|---|---|---|---|---|---|---|
| | Shane Nelson | def. | Aaron Wetherspoon | TKO (Doctor Stoppage) | 2 | 1:33 |
| | Emanuel Newton | def. | Ricky Shivers | Decision (Unanimous) | 3 | 5:00 |
| | Dave Huckaba | def. | Ruben Villareal | Decision (Unanimous) | 3 | 5:00 |
| | Alexander Crispim | def. | Randy Spence | Submission (Brabo Choke) | 3 | 1:01 |
| | Roy Boughton | def. | Adriano Camolese | TKO (Punches) | 2 | 3:07 |
| | Krasimir Mladenov | def. | Brandon Sene | Decision (Unanimous) | 3 | 5:00 |
| | Anthony Avila | def. | Ben Santiago | Submission (Rear-Naked Choke) | 3 | 1:59 |
| | Scott Rosa | def. | Justin Cutler | Submission (Guillotine Choke) | 2 | 1:05 |

== Shark Fights 19 ==
Shark Fights 19 was an event held on September 10, 2011 at the Independence Events Center in Independence, Missouri.

=== Results ===
Main Card
| Weight class | | | | Method | Round | Time | Notes |
|---|---|---|---|---|---|---|---|
| | Romario Manoel Da Silva | def. | Jaime Jara | Decision (Unanimous) | 3 | 5:00 |
| | Rob Kimmons | def. | Chuck Parmelee | Submission (Guillotine Choke) | 1 | 0:53 |
| | Brian Davidson | def. | Vincent Eazelle | Decision (Unanimous) | 3 | 5:00 |
| | Kelvin Tiller | def. | Jeb Chiles | Submission (Armbar) | 1 | 4:14 |
| | Nick Nolte | def. | Rashid Abdullah | Submission (Triangle Choke) | 1 | 2:55 |
| | Owen Evinger | def. | Chad Vandenberg | Decision (Unanimous) | 3 | 5:00 |
| | Dallas Browning | def. | Brian Imes | Submission (Heel Hook) | 1 | 3:36 |
| | Aaron Ely | def. | Josh Phillips | Submission (Triangle Choke) | 1 | 1:29 |
| | Danny Mainus | def. | Kyle Carver | Submission (Rear-Naked Choke) | 1 | 0:46 |
| | Matt Uhde | def. | Aaron Mays | Submission (Kimura) | 1 | 4:50 |
| | James Krause | def. | Steve Schneider | Submission (Rear-Naked Choke) | 2 | 2:46 |
| | Nadia Nixon | def. | Jody Lynn Reicher | Decision (Unanimous) | 3 | 3:00 |

== Shark Fights 20 ==
Shark Fights 20 was an event held on October 15, 2011 at the Edgewater Casino Resort in Laughlin, Nevada.

=== Results ===
Main Card
| Weight class | | | | Method | Round | Time | Notes |
|---|---|---|---|---|---|---|---|
| | Clifford Starks | def. | Artenas Young | Decision (Unanimous) | 3 | 5:00 |
| | Roberto Vargas | def. | Jared Downing | Decision (Split) | 3 | 5:00 |
| | Alan Jouban | def. | D.J. Roberson | Decision (Unanimous) | 3 | 5:00 |
| | Josh Huber | def. | Jason Trevino | Submission (Rear-Naked Choke) | 2 | 4:43 |
| | Eddie Jackson | def. | Rich Campbell | TKO (Punches) | 1 | 4:40 |
| | Ernie Calma | def. | Anthony Guerra | Submission (Triangle Choke) | 1 | 1:55 |
| | Chris Brady | def. | Ian Omalza | TKO (Punches) | 2 | 2:34 |
| | Antonio Yadao | def. | Christian Palencia | Decision (Unanimous) | 3 | 3:00 |

== Shark Fights 21: Lashley vs. Knothe ==
Shark Fights 21: Lashley vs. Knothe was an event held on November 11, 2011 at the Fair Park Coliseum in Lubbock, Texas.

=== Results ===
Main Card
| Weight class | | | | Method | Round | Time | Notes |
|---|---|---|---|---|---|---|---|
| | Bobby Lashley | def. | Karl Knothe | Submission (Keylock) | 1 | 3:44 | (Note: For the vacant Shark Fights Heavyweight Championship) |
| | Cody East | def. | Adenilson Clementino | TKO (Punches) | 2 | 1:15 |
| | Cody Pfister | def. | Isaias Martinez | TKO (Punches) | 1 | 4:09 |
| | Warren Stewart | def. | Gabriel Vasquez | Submission (Rear-Naked Choke) | 1 | 3:46 |
| | John King | def. | Daniel Almeida | Decision (Split) | 3 | 3:00 |
| | Rashad Coulter | def. | Chase Watson | TKO (Punches) | 3 | 2:39 |
| | Jon Voth | def. | Jeremiah Castillo | Submission (Armbar) | 1 | 2:27 |
| | Matt Hobar | def. | Marcus Baldivia | Submission (North-South Choke) | 1 | 0:53 |
