= 2008 in Shark Fights =

Mixed martial arts events

Information
- First date: October 24, 2008
- Last date: December 13, 2008

Events
- Total events: 2

Fights
- Total fights: 17

Chronology
2008 in Shark Fights	2009 in Shark Fights

The year 2008 is the first year in the history of Shark Fights, a mixed martial arts promotion based in the United States. In 2008 Shark Fights held 2 events beginning with, Shark Fights 1.

== Events list ==
#	Event Title	Date	Arena	Location	Notes
2	Shark Fights 2	December 13, 2008	Azteca Music Hall	Amarillo, Texas	
1	Shark Fights 1	October 24, 2008	Amarillo National Center	Amarillo, Texas	

== Shark Fights 1 ==
Shark Fights 1 was held on October 24, 2008, at the Amarillo National Center in Amarillo, Texas.

=== Results ===
Main Card
Weight class				Method	Round	Time	Notes
	Shannon Ritch	def.	John Wood	Submission (Heel Hook)	1	0:47
	Eric Davila	def.	Richie Hightower	Decision (Split)	3	5:00
	Lynn Alvarez	def.	Chelsea Colarelli	Submission (Armbar)	1	1:56
	Douglas Evans	def.	Jared Lopez	Submission (Armbar)	1	1:09
	Marcus Sursa	def.	Bryan Pardoe	TKO (Punches)	1	1:04
	Anselmo Martinez	def.	Jeff Paulson	TKO (Doctor Stoppage)	3	0:35
	Douglas Frey	def.	Jeff Stirley	TKO (Punches)	1	2:27
	Bryan Humes	def.	Joel Traves	Decision (Unanimous)	3	5:00
	Brooks Robertson	def.	Bobby Reneau	Submission (Armbar)	1	1:45

== Shark Fights 2 ==
Shark Fights 2 was held on December 13, 2008, at the Azteca Music Hall in Amarillo, Texas.

=== Results ===
Main Card
Weight class				Method	Round	Time	Notes
	Ray Lizama	def.	Ovince St. Preux	Decision (Unanimous)	3	3:00
	Douglas Frey	def.	Jared Lopez	Submission (Armbar)	1	1:15
	Eric Davila	def.	Liam McCarty	Submission	2	3:30
	Mark Thomas Grissom	def.	Jerre Thompson	Submission	2	0:37
	Aaron Garcia	def.	Bryan Valdez	TKO (Punches)	2	0:48
	Anselmo Martinez	def.	Steve Eldridge	KO (Punch)	1	0:11
	Shannon Ritch	def.	John Wood	KO (Head Kick)	1	0:15
	Brandi Hainey	def.	Angelita Davis	Submission (Armbar)	3	1:51

== See also ==
- Shark Fights
