= 2009 in Shark Fights =

Mixed martial arts events

Information
- First date: March 14, 2009
- Last date: November 28, 2009

Events
- Total events: 5

Fights
- Total fights: 43

Chronology
2008 in Shark Fights	2009 in Shark Fights	2010 in Shark Fights

The year 2009 is the second year in the history of Shark Fights, a mixed martial arts promotion based in the United States. In 2009 Shark Fights held 5 events beginning with, Shark Fights 3.

== Events list ==
#	Event title	Date	Arena	Location	Notes
7	Shark Fights 7: Sursa vs Prangley	November 28, 2009	Azteca Music Hall	Amarillo, Texas	
6	Shark Fights 6: Stars & Stripes	September 12, 2009	Amarillo Civic Center	Amarillo, Texas	
5	Shark Fights 5.5: Nothing To Lose	July 18, 2009	Gamboa's Outdoor Event Center	Amarillo, Texas	10,603 people in attendance.
-	Shark Fights 5: Outdoor Bash & Brawl	June 27, 2009	Gamboa's Outdoor Event Center	Amarillo, Texas	Canceled due to bad weather.
4	Shark Fights 4: Richards vs Schoonover	May 2, 2009	Citibank Coliseum	Lubbock, Texas	
3	Shark Fights 3	March 14, 2009	Azteca Music Hall	Amarillo, Texas	

== Shark Fights 3 ==
Shark Fights 3 was held on March 14, 2009, at the Azteca Music Hall in Amarillo, Texas.

=== Results ===
Main Card
Weight class				Method	Round	Time	Notes
	Eric Davila	def.	Shannon Ritch	Submission (Arm-Triangle Choke)	1	1:15
	Joel Traves	def.	Aaron Garcia	Submission	2	1:21
	Anselmo Martinez	def.	Warren Stewart	KO (Punch)	1	4:16
	Tessa Simpson	def.	Angelita Davis	Submission (Triangle Choke)	1	0:48
	Justin Head	def.	Joshua Shepard	Submission (Rear-Naked Choke)	3	0:52
	Kyle Bracey	def.	Sean Ward	Decision (Unanimous)	3	3:00
	Jamie Steichen	def.	Abel Vargas	Submission (Heel Hook)	1	0:26
	Chelsea Colarelli	def.	Brandi Hainey	Submission (Triangle Choke)	2	2:16
	Douglas Frey	def.	Rolo Lorenty	TKO (Punches)	1	1:55

== Shark Fights 4: Richards vs Schoonover ==
Shark Fights 4: Richards vs Schoonover was held on May 2, 2009, at the Citibank Coliseum in Lubbock, Texas.

=== Results ===
Main Card
Weight class				Method	Round	Time	Notes
	Darrill Schoonover	def.	Rex Richards	TKO (Punches)	4	1:19
	Jesse Taylor	def.	Eric Davila	Submission (Rear-Naked Choke)	1	2:29
	Don Frye	def.	Rich Moss	Submission (Rear-Naked Choke)	1	2:12
	Phil Cardella	def.	Johnny Flores	Submission (Armbar)	1	0:48
	T.J. Waldburger	def.	Shannon Ritch	Submission (Armbar)	1	1:37
	Rolando Scott	def.	Zach Haney	TKO (Punches)	1	2:58
	Douglas Frey	def.	Anselmo Luna	KO (Punch)	1	2:00
	Jessica Miramontes	def.	Brandi Hainey	Decision (Unanimous)	3	3:00
	Joshua Shepard	def.	Aaron Garcia	TKO (Corner Stoppage)	1	3:00

== Shark Fights 5.5: Nothing To Lose ==
Shark Fights 5.5: Nothing To Lose was held on July 18, 2009, at the Gamboa's Outdoor Event Center in Amarillo, Texas.

=== Results ===
Main Card
Weight class				Method	Round	Time	Notes
	Douglas Evans	def.	Douglas Frey	Submission (Guillotine Choke)	2	1:46
	Rolando Scott	def.	Mark Thomas Grissom	TKO (Punches)	3	1:51
	Tony Castillo	def.	Joshua Milward	Submission (Guillotine Choke)	1	1:00
	Edgar Santos	def.	Conan Cano	Submission (Kneebar)	1	2:00
	Nissen Osterneck	def.	Kyle Bracey	Submission (Triangle Choke)	1	1:05
	Bryan Humes	def.	Elmar Nicely	Submission (Rear-Naked Choke)	1	0:59
	Heath Dodgen	def.	Brooks Robertson	Decision (Unanimous)	3	3:00
	Marcus Sursa	def.	Ricky Shivers	Submission (Triangle Choke)	2	0:57

== Shark Fights 6: Stars & Stripes ==
Shark Fights 6: Stars & Stripes was an event held on September 12, 2009, at the Amarillo National Center in Amarillo, Texas.

=== Results ===
Main Card
Weight class				Method	Round	Time	Notes
	Dave Herman	def.	Don Frye	TKO (Punches)	1	1:00
	Gerald Harris	def.	Nissen Osterneck	KO (Punch)	1	0:46
	T.J. Waldburger	def.	Pat Healy	Decision (Unanimous)	3	5:00
	Ran Weathers	def.	Phil Cardella	KO (Punch)	1	0:36
	Marcus Sursa	def.	Isaac Villanueva	Submission (Guillotine Choke)	1	2:06
	Bryan Humes	def.	Lance Friedenstein	Decision (Unanimous)	3	5:00
	Anselmo Martinez	def.	Lorenzo Borgomeo	TKO (Didn't Answer Bell)	1	5:00
	Karen Darabedyan	def.	Estevan Payan	TKO (Punches)	1	1:20
	Clay Hantz	def.	Tony Castillo	Decision (Unanimous)	3	5:00

== Shark Fights 7: Sursa vs Prangley ==
Shark Fights 7: Sursa vs Prangley was held on November 28, 2009, at the Azteca Music Hall in Amarillo, Texas.

=== Results ===
Main Card
Weight class				Method	Round	Time	Notes
	Trevor Prangley	def.	Marcus Sursa	Submission (Rear-Naked Choke)	1	4:40
	Liam McCarty	def.	Tony Castillo	Submission (Triangle Choke)	2	2:03
	Kyle Bracey	def.	Steven Ray	Submission (North-South Choke)	2	2:02
	Brandi Hainey	def.	Yadira Anzaldua	Submission (Guillotine Choke)	2	1:03
	Jared Lopez	def.	William Tyler Dodson	KO (Punches)	1	0:46
	Josh Luna	def.	Chase Watson	TKO (Punches)	1	1:27
	Eric Rodriguez	def.	Joshua Milward	Submission (Rear-Naked Choke)	1	1:07
	Anselmo Luna	def.	Severo Padilla	KO (Punches)	1	0:58

== See also ==
- Shark Fights
