= Rock Riddle =

American retired professional wrestler

Personal information
- Born: Steve Riddle Jr. Burlington, North Carolina, United States

Professional wrestling career
- Ring name(s): Rock Riddle; Steve Riddle; Mephisto
- Billed weight: 235 lb (107 kg)
- Debut: 1972
- Retired: April 29, 2019

Steve Riddle Jr. is an American retired professional wrestler and actor, best known under the ring name Rock Riddle. He worked in the Gulf Coast, California, American Wrestling Association and World Class Championship Wrestling during the 1970s and 1980s. Later in his career he worked in the independent circuit in California mainly for Empire Wrestling Federation.

== Professional wrestling career ==
Growing up Riddle was a wrestling fan and started a fan club for Swede Hanson and Rip Hawk.

He made his wrestling debut in 1972 for NWA Mid-America in Tennessee. Later he worked for Gulf Coast Championship Wrestling, and American Wrestling Association in Minnesota. In 1975, he made his debut for Big Time Wrestling in San Francisco. Then worked in Texas for World Class Championship Wrestling in 1983.

In 1988, he worked in a couple of matches for World Championship Wrestling. Afterwards, he disappeared from wrestling.

On October 10, 2007, Riddle returned to wrestling competing in a battle royal won by Shannon Ritch at WrestleFanFest Malice in the Palace at the Cow Palace in San Francisco. He worked in the independents in California and Las Vegas. Mostly Empire Wrestling Federation where he was their champion for a day in 2014. His last match was on April 29, 2019 when he defeated Matt Striker at Casino Royale 2019 (Day 2) in Las Vegas.

== Championships and accomplishments ==
- Cauliflower Alley Club
  - REEL Award (2007)
- Gulf Coast Championship Wrestling
  - City Of Pensacola Heavyweight Championship (1 time)
- Empire Wrestling Federation
  - EWF Heavyweight Championship (1 time)
- NWA Hollywood Wrestling
  - NWA Americas Tag Team Championship (1 time) - with John Tolos
