= 2010 in Shark Fights =

Mixed martial arts events

Information
- First date: February 5, 2010
- Last date: September 11, 2010

Events
- Total events: 6

Fights
- Total fights: 52

Chronology
2009 in Shark Fights	2010 in Shark Fights	2011 in Shark Fights

The year 2010 is the third year in the history of Shark Fights, a mixed martial arts promotion based in the United States. In 2010 Shark Fights held 6 events beginning with, Shark Fights 8: Super Brawl.

== Events list ==
#	Event title	Date	Arena	Location	Notes
13	Shark Fights 13: Jardine vs Prangley	September 11, 2010	Amarillo Civic Center	Amarillo, Texas	First Live Pay-Per-View
12	Shark Fights 12: Unfinished Business	June 26, 2010	Gamboa's Outdoor Event Center	Amarillo, Texas	This event had 10,918 people in attendance.
11	Shark Fights 11: Humes vs Buentello	May 22, 2010	Ector County Coliseum	Odessa, Texas	
10	Shark Fights 10: Unfinished Business	April 24, 2010	Fair Park Coliseum	Lubbock, Texas	
9	Shark Fights 9: Phillips vs Evans	March 20, 2010	Amarillo Civic Center	Amarillo, Texas	
8	Shark Fights 8: Super Brawl	February 5, 2010	Fair Park Coliseum	Lubbock, Texas	

== Shark Fights 8: Super Brawl ==
Shark Fights 8: Super Brawl was held on February 5, 2010 at the Fair Park Coliseum in Lubbock, Texas.

=== Results ===
Main Card
Weight class				Method	Round	Time	Notes
	Josh Neer	def.	Anselmo Martinez	Submission (Rear-Naked Choke)	1	3:05
	Kyle Bracey	def.	Eric Davila	Submission (Guillotine Choke)	1	1:39
	Anselmo Luna	def.	Clay Hantz	Submission (Rear-Naked Choke)	1	4:50
	Jessica Miramontes	def.	Yadira Anzaldua	TKO (Punches)	1	2:11
	John King	def.	Skyler Duncan	TKO (Punches)	1	0:28
	Douglas Frey	def.	Jared Lopez	Submission (Guillotine Choke)	1	4:57
	Cody Pfister	def.	Jerry Hinojosa	KO (Punches)	1	0:49
	Mitchell Hale	def.	Devon Nichols	Decision (Unanimous)	3	5:00

== Shark Fights 9: Phillips vs Evans ==
Shark Fights 9: Phillips vs Evans was held on March 20, 2010 at the Amarillo Civic Center in Amarillo, Texas.

=== Results ===
Main Card
Weight class				Method	Round	Time	Notes
	Douglas Evans	def.	Dustin Phillips	Submission (Heel Hook)	1	2:25
	Pedro Galiza	def.	Vinny Magalhaes	Decision (Unanimous)	3	5:00
	Josh Luna	def.	John King	TKO (Punches)	1	1:11
	Kenny Trevino	def.	Eric Rodriguez	Submission (Rear-Naked Choke)	2	2:18
	Tony Castillo	def.	Edwynn Jones	Submission (Rear-Naked Choke)	1	3:09
	Isaias Martinez	def.	Donnie Frye	Submission (Armbar)	2	4:55
	Cody Pfister	def.	Severo Padilla	TKO (Punches)	1	2:52
	Jason Sampson	def.	Jeremy Valderaz	Submission (Armbar)	1	2:50

== Shark Fights 10: Unfinished Business ==
Shark Fights 10: Unfinished Business was held on April 24, 2010 at the Fair Park Coliseum in Lubbock, Texas.

=== Results ===
Main Card
Weight class				Method	Round	Time	Notes
	Eric Davila	def.	Anselmo Martinez	Decision (Split)	3	5:00
	Jessica Miramontes	def.	Brandi Hainey	Decision (Unanimous)	3	3:00
	Isaac Villanueva	def.	Josh Luna	TKO (Punches)	1	0:28
	Isaias Martinez	def.	Jerry Hinojosa	Submission (Rear-Naked Choke)	1	2:28
	Cody Pfister	def.	Gino Davila	Decision (Unanimous)	3	3:00
	Jeremiah Castillo	def.	Jeremy Valderaz	Submission (Keylock)	3	1:47
	Chase Watson	def.	Aaron Garcia	TKO (Retirement)	2	3:00
	Joseph Sandoval	def.	Matt Espinoza	Decision (Unanimous)	3	3:00
	Lance Bartholomew	def.	Sergio Davila	Submission (Rear-Naked Choke)	1	0:35

== Shark Fights 11: Humes vs Buentello ==
Shark Fights 11: Humes vs Buentello was held on May 22, 2010 at the Ector County Coliseum in Odessa, Texas.

=== Results ===
Main Card
Weight class				Method	Round	Time	Notes
	Paul Buentello	def.	Bryan Humes	Decision (Unanimous)	3	5:00
	Derek Campos	def.	Anselmo Luna	Decision (Unanimous)	3	5:00
	Clinton Holcomb	def.	Lance Bartholomew	KO (Punches)	3	1:42
	Tony Castillo	def.	Christopher Golden	Submission (Rear-Naked Choke)	2	2:47
	Joseph Sandoval	def.	Derrick Carter	KO (Punches)	1	1:36
	Armando Herrera Jr.	def.	Chase Watson	Decision (Unanimous)	3	5:00
	Jason Sampson	def.	Jeremiah Castillo	TKO (Punches)	1	1:33
	Mark Martinez	def.	Bryan Valdez	Submission (Guillotine Choke)	1	2:36

== Shark Fights 12: Unfinished Business ==
Shark Fights 12: Unfinished Business was held on June 26, 2010 at the Gamboa's Outdoor Event Center in Amarillo, Texas.

=== Results ===
Main Card
Weight class				Method	Round	Time	Notes
	Josh Luna	def.	John King	Submission (Guillotine Choke)	1	1:33
	Cody Pfister	def.	Mitchell Hale	Decision (Split)	3	5:00
	Mike Bronzoulis	def.	Anselmo Martinez	DQ	2	3:54
	Isaac Villanueva	def.	Chase Watson	Decision (Unanimous)	3	5:00
	Joseph Sandoval	def.	Jared Lopez	Decision (Unanimous)	3	5:00
	Edgar Santos	def.	Rodney McFarland	Submission (Armbar)	2	2:17
	Gino Davila	def.	Donnie Frye	Decision (Unanimous)	3	5:00
	Aaron Cerda	def.	Derek Cansino	Submission (Rear-Naked Choke)	2	2:45
	Layne Hernandez	def.	Armando Herrera Jr.	TKO (Punches)	1	0:47

== Shark Fights 13: Jardine vs Prangley ==
Shark Fights 13: Jardine vs Prangley was held on September 11, 2010 at the Amarillo Civic Center in Amarillo, Texas.

=== Results ===
Main Card
Weight class				Method	Round	Time	Notes
	Trevor Prangley	def.	Keith Jardine	Decision (Split)	3	5:00
	Houston Alexander	def.	Rameau Thierry Sokoudjou	TKO (Punches)	2	1:31
	Paul Daley	def.	Jorge Masvidal	Decision (Unanimous)	3	5:00
	Danillo Villefort	def.	Joey Villasenor	Decision (Unanimous)	3	5:00
	Tarec Saffiedine	def.	Brock Larson	Decision (Unanimous)	3	5:00
	Paul Bradley	def.	Johnny Rees	Submission (Rear-Naked Choke)	1	4:28
	Ronnie Mann	def.	Douglas Evans	Decision (Split)	5	5:00
	Aaron Rosa	def.	Devin Cole	Decision (Unanimous)	3	5:00
	Daniel Mason-Straus	def.	Karen Darabedyan	Decision (Unanimous)	3	5:00
	Eric Davila	def.	Pete Spratt	Submission (Guillotine Choke)	2	3:49
