= Lucas Lopes =

American mixed martial arts fighter

Lucas Lopes de Freitas
- Born: May 15, 1979 (age 47); Natal, Rio Grande do Norte, Brazil
- Height: 6 ft 3 in (1.91 m)
- Weight: 185 lb (84 kg; 13.2 st)
- Division: Light Heavyweight; Middleweight; Welterweight
- Team: Bungalow 38
- Rank: 3rd degree black belt in Brazilian Jiu-Jitsu under Francisco “Kiko” France
- Years active: 1999–2015, 2019–present

Mixed martial arts record
- Total: 49
- Wins: 29
- By knockout: 14
- By submission: 10
- By decision: 4
- By disqualification: 1
- Losses: 20
- By knockout: 9
- By submission: 6
- By decision: 5

Other information
- Mixed martial arts record from Sherdog

Lucas Lopes de Freitas (born October 5, 1979) is a Brazilian mixed martial artist. A professional since 1999, he has competed for Strikeforce, Shooto, and Titan FC.

== Mixed martial arts ==
=== Early career ===
Lopes made his professional debut in 1999, compiling a record of 21-8 before being signed by Strikeforce.

=== Strikeforce ===
Lopes made his promotional debut at Strikeforce: Lawler vs. Shields on June 6, 2009, facing 12-5-1 Scott Ventimiglia. He won via disqualification.

He later returned at Strikeforce Challengers 5 against Dominic Brown. Lopes won via second-round TKO.

In 2010, Lopes returned against Cortez Coleman at Strikeforce: Henderson vs. Babalu. He lost via first-round submission.

Professional record breakdown
49 matches	29 wins	20 losses
By knockout	14	9
By submission	10	6
By decision	4	5
By disqualification	1	0

Res.	Record	Opponent	Method	Event	Date	Round	Time	Location	Notes
Loss	29-20	DeWayne Diggs	TKO (punches)	Shamrock FC 222	September 6, 2019	1	1:09	St. Louis, Missouri, United States	Catchweight (210 lbs) bout.
Loss	29-19	Keith Smetana	Submission (rear-naked choke)	Shamrock Promotions: Force	January 31, 2015	1	1:30	St. Louis, Missouri, United States	
Loss	29-18	Dustin Jacoby	TKO (head kick and punches)	TFC 29: Titan Fighting Championship 29	August 22, 2014	1	4:15	Fayetteville, North Carolina, United States	Light Heavyweight bout.
Win	29-17	Brian Grinnell	Submission	XFL: Rumble on the River 8	March 28, 2014	1	4:03	Tulsa, Oklahoma, United States	
Win	28-17	George Altamirano	TKO (punches)	RDC MMA: Reto de Campeones MMA	February 14, 2014	1	0:40	Mexico City, Mexico	
Loss	27-17	Sergio Fernandes	Submission (rear-naked choke)	HFR 3: High Fight Rock 3	June 15, 2013	2	0:00	Anápolis, Goiás, Brazil	
Loss	27-16	Dan McGlasson	TKO (punches)	Shamrock Promotions: Fight Night	March 23, 2013	1	4:44	St. Louis, Missouri, United States	
Win	27-15	Petras Markevicius	Submission (kneebar)	Flawless FC 2: Hated	December 15, 2012	1	0:54	Chicago, Illinois, United States	
Loss	26-15	Leo Pla	Decision (split)	Shamrock Promotions: Legacy	September 29, 2012	3	5:00	St. Louis, Missouri, United States	
Win	26-14	Kalel Robinson	Submission (armbar)	Shamrock Promotions: Chaos	July 28, 2012	1	2:11	St. Louis, Missouri, United States	
Loss	25-14	Sam Alvey	TKO (punches)	SF: ShoFight 20	June 16, 2012	1	1:39	Springfield, Missouri, United States	
Win	25-13	Eddie Larrea	Submission (armbar)	Shamrock Promotions: Fight Night	June 1, 2012	1	1:14	St. Louis, Missouri, United States	
Loss	24-13	Chuck Parmelee	KO (punch)	Fight Me MMA: Trujillo vs. Gwaltney	August 13, 2011	1	0:42	St. Charles, Missouri, United States	
Loss	24-12	Mike Bronzoulis	Decision (unanimous)	Shark Fights 14: Horwich vs. Villefort	March 11, 2011	3	5:00	Lubbock, Texas, United States	Catchweight (175 lbs) bout.
Loss	24-11	Cortez Coleman	Submission (guillotine choke)	Strikeforce: Henderson vs. Babalu II	December 4, 2010	1	2:04	St. Louis, Missouri, United States	
Loss	24-10	Brendan Seguin	TKO (retirement)	Fight Me MMA 1: The Battle Begins	August 14, 2010	1	5:00	St. Charles, Missouri, United States	
Loss	24-9	Billy Horne	Submission (rear-naked choke)	MMA Big Show: All or Nothing	July 17, 2010	1	4:10	Indiana, United States	
Win	24-8	Bubba McDaniel	KO (punches)	MMA Big Show: A Prodigy Returns	April 17, 2010	1	2:13	Florence, Indiana, United States	
Win	23-8	Dominic Brown	TKO (punches)	Strikeforce Challengers: Woodley vs. Bears	November 20, 2009	2	0:45	Kansas City, Kansas, United States	Catchweight (190 lbs) bout.
Win	22-8	Scott Ventimiglia	DQ (illegal knee)	Strikeforce: Lawler vs. Shields	June 6, 2009	1	3:26	St. Louis, Missouri, United States	
Win	21-8	Herbert Goodman	Decision (unanimous)	HP: The Patriot Act 2	April 25, 2009	3	5:00	Columbia, Missouri, United States	
Win	20-8	Andre Castanhal	TKO (punches)	SVT: Para vs. Northeast	June 25, 2008	3	1:51	Belém, Pará, Brazil	
Loss	19-8	Valter Roberto de Menezes	Submission (arm triangle choke)	RF 4: Real Fight 4	August 18, 2007	2	4:02	São José dos Campos, São Paulo, Brazil	
Win	19-7	Joao Vicente Santiago Jr.	Submission (triangle choke)	Leal Combat: Natal	July 5, 2007	1	1:45	Rio Grande do Norte, Brazil	
Win	18-7	Zeca Doido	TKO (punches)	Shock Fight: Vale Tudo	May 10, 2007	3	2:11	João Pessoa, Paraíba, Brazil	
Win	17-7	Anderson Cruz	Submission (punches)	NCC: Nordeste Combat Championship	May 9, 2007	1	1:45	Rio Grande do Norte, Brazil	
Loss	16-7	Sean Salmon	Submission	FF 6: Fightfest 6	September 23, 2006	2	2:44	Corpus Christi, Texas, United States	
Win	16-6	Wayne Cole	TKO (corner stoppage)	DPP: September to Remember	September 17, 2006	2	5:00	Lafayette, Louisiana, United States	
Win	15-6	Todd Seyler	Submission	FF 4: Fightfest 4	May 20, 2006	1	1:05	Corpus Christi, Texas, United States	
Loss	14-6	Ron Fields	Decision (unanimous)	BATB: Battle at the Boardwalk (Day 1)	February 17, 2006	3	5:00	Atlantic City, New Jersey, United States	
Win	14-5	Scott Harper	Submission (arm triangle choke)	FT 6: Full Throttle 6	February 11, 2006	1	3:44	Atlanta, Georgia, United States	
Loss	13-5	Seth Kleinbeck	TKO (punches)	FT 5: Full Throttle 5	November 4, 2005	1	3:12	Georgia, United States	
Win	13-4	Samuel Gaskins	KO (punches)	Shooto: Battle at the Ballpark 2	October 22, 2005	1	0:58	St. Louis, Missouri, United States	
Win	12-4	Sydney Machado	Decision	Costa Rica: Fights 1	April 15, 2005	0	0:00	Costa Rica	
Loss	11-4	Adriano Martins	Decision (unanimous)	GOTJ: Gladiator of the Jungle 1	March 7, 2004	1	10:00	Manaus, Brazil	
Win	11-3	Waldir dos Anjos	TKO (doctor stoppage)	GVTO: Garra Vale Tudo Open 3	October 10, 2003	1	4:07	Aracaju, Sergipe, Brazil	
Loss	10-3	Evangelista Santos	TKO (punches and leg kick)	Jungle Fight 1	September 13, 2003	2	4:08	Manaus, Brazil	
Win	10-2	Antonio Mendes	TKO (cut)	BC: Bitetti Combat Nordeste 2	March 20, 2003	2	N/A	Rio Grande do Norte, Brazil	
Loss	9-2	Jorge Magalhaes	Decision (split)	BC: Bitetti Combat Nordeste 1	November 28, 2002	3	5:00	Rio Grande do Norte, Brazil	
Loss	9-1	Nilson de Castro	TKO (strikes)	Meca 7: Meca World Vale Tudo 7	November 8, 2002	1	7:00	Curitiba, Parana, Brazil	
Win	9-0	Luis Mello	Submission	CN 5: Champions Night 5	July 11, 2002	1	0:00	Ceará, Brazil	
Win	8-0	Andre Cardoso	TKO (knees)	GVTO: Garra Vale Tudo Open 2	March 10, 2002	1	2:39	Aracaju, Sergipe, Brazil	
Win	7-0	Thiago Alves	Decision (unanimous)	X: Fight	September 28, 2001	3	5:00	João Pessoa, Paraíba, Brazil	
Win	6-0	Ronald Vasconselos	TKO (punches)	CN: Champions Night 2	June 30, 2001	1	1:30	Ceará, Brazil	
Win	5-0	Reginaldo Silva	TKO (punches)	WVC 13: World Vale Tudo Championship 13	June 9, 2001	1	2:25	Pernambuco, Brazil	
Win	4-0	Almir Trator	KO (punch)	SPVTC: Serido Professional Vale Tudo Circuit 3	July 3, 2000	1	3:49	Rio Grande do Norte, Brazil	
Win	3-0	Breno Breno	KO (punch)	CNVTO: Currais Novos Vale Tudo Open	May 18, 2000	1	1:27	Rio Grande do Norte, Brazil	
Win	2-0	Marcelo de Oliveira	Decision (unanimous)	AFC: Asekan Freestyle Cup	May 18, 2000	3	5:00	Ceará, Brazil	
Win	1-0	Jalmir Ferreira	Submission (guillotine choke)	CNVTO: Currais Novos Vale Tudo Open	October 23, 1999	3	0:46	Rio Grande do Norte, Brazil	

== See also ==
- List of male mixed martial artists
