= WrestleFanFest Malice in the Palace =

Malice in the Palace
- Promotion: WrestleFanFest
- Date: October 19, 2007
- City: Daly City, California
- Venue: Cow Palace

Malice in the Palace was a professional wrestling event that was filmed on October 19, 2007 at the Cow Palace in Daly City, California. The event was filmed for broadcast and DVD release by Big Vision Entertainment.

The event was free to attendees of the weekend-long WrestleFanFest convention. The convention was also slated to host a Mixed Martial Arts event the following night, but it was canceled by the California State Athletic Commission due to the caged enclosure missing two required support beams

The originally announced card featured wrestlers that did not end up appearing, including Goldberg, The Outsiders, Sid Vicious, Andrew Martin, Mil Máscaras, Kevin Sullivan, Dan Severn and Marty Jannetty.

== Results ==
No.	Results	Stipulations
1^{D}	The Steiner Brothers (Rick Steiner and Scott Steiner) defeated Team 3D (Brother Ray and Brother Devon)	Tag team match
2^{D}	Gail Kim defeated Tracy Brooks and Cheerleader Melissa	Three-way match
3	The Blue Meanie and Al Snow defeated Luke Hawx and Alkatrazz	Tag team match
4	The Powers of Pain (The Barbarian and The Warlord) defeated Kamala and The One Man Gang	Tag team match
5^{D}	Abyss and Shark Boy defeated Lance Hoyt and French Stallion	Tag team match
6	Vampire Warrior, Black Pearl and Rikishi defeated Vic Grimes, Gangsta X and Orlando Jordan	Six-man tag team match
7	Shannon Ritch defeated Chavo Guerrero Sr., Rock Riddle, JD Michaels, T-Rent, D-Unit, Alexis Darevko, Helfyre, Jason Vega, Maynard Skynard, Sir Samurai, Mr. Frost, Timothy Thatcher, Virgil Flynn, Mike Hayashi, Sexy Chino, Robbie Gilmore, The Ghetto Hesimen Badd Blood and others.	"Night of Indys" Battle Royal
8	Greg Valentine and Brutus Beefcake defeated Koko B. Ware and Steve Williams	Tag team match
9	Último Dragón defeated Billy Kidman	Singles match
10	The Great Muta (with Bobcat) defeated The Sandman (with Baby Doll) and Steve Corino (with Francine)	Three-way match
D / – this was a dark match
