= Ronnie Mann =

British martial artist

- Born: Ronnie Mann; 12 October 1986 (age 40); Bangkok, Thailand
- Other names: Kid Ninja; Iron
- Nationality: English; Thai
- Height: 5 ft 6 in (1.68 m)
- Weight: 135 lb (61 kg; 9.6 st)
- Division: Bantamweight; Featherweight
- Fighting out of: Cheltenham, England, United Kingdom
- Team: Iron Mann Gym
- Rank: Black belt in Brazilian Jiu-Jitsu under Braulio Estima
- Years active: 2003–2017

Mixed martial arts record
- Total: 34
- Wins: 24
- By knockout: 4
- By submission: 11
- By decision: 8
- Unknown: 1
- Losses: 9
- By knockout: 1
- By submission: 2
- By decision: 6
- Draws: 1

Other information
- Mixed martial arts record from Sherdog

Ronnie Mann (born 12 October 1986) is an English professional mixed martial artist who competes in the featherweight division. A professional competitor from 2003 to 2017, Mann has mostly fought in England and Japan. Mann is a veteran of the former top English organisation Cage Rage Championships and was a quarterfinalist in the Sengoku Featherweight Grand Prix in 2009, losing to Hatsu Hioki.

== Mixed martial arts career ==
=== Background and early career ===
Mann grew up in Cheltenham, England. Mann also idolised Marco Ruas and Royce Gracie as a youngster after being introduced to the Ultimate Fighting Championship. Mann began taking Muay Thai lessons at the age of 11 and participated in jiu-jitsu and kickboxing tournaments at the age of 13. Mann competed in his first amateur fight at the age of 16 and turned professional a year later. In Japan, he fought under the name of Ronnie Ushiwaka, his mother's maiden name.( His Mothers Maiden Name was Promlert (THAI) Mann's professional mixed martial arts career began in November 2003 with a win over Andy Dicks. A few months later, Mann made his Shooto debut, at Shooto Holland where he won via triangle choke after 56 seconds. Staying in Holland, Mann won a further fight, knocking his opponent out in under two minutes. Mann then recorded five successive submission victories.

=== Domestic prominence ===
In mid-2006, Mann signed with top domestic organisation, Cage Rage and made his promotional debut at the Cage Rage: Contenders 1 event against Ashleigh Grimshaw. Mann later stated that the fight was one of his toughest, especially after being hit with an early low blow. The organisation, at the time, adopted the "open guard rule," allowing fighters to stomp on each other. At the end of the third round, the fight was declared a draw, despite Mann feeling that he had the better of the fight, after a knockdown in the first round and a triangle choke attempt in the second round.

Mann later joined the Cage Gladiators promotion in England and made his promotional debut at Cage Gladiators 2, against Denas Banevicius, winning via submission (strikes) at 1:42 of the first round. Three months later, Mann returned at Cage Gladiators 3, defeating Chris Freeborn via submission (triangle choke) at 2:46 of the first round.

At Cage Rage 20, in a rematch with Ashleigh Grimshaw, whom Mann had earlier drawn with, Mann controlled the stand-up and the top position on the floor. Towards the end of the fight, Grimshaw attempted a comeback, utilising ground-and-pound offense, though Mann was declared the winner via unanimous decision after three rounds.

Mann's next fight (and third in the Cage Rage organisation) was against top domestic prospect, Robbie Olivier. The fight saw both fighters neutralise the other's ground game. In the stand-up, Mann was regarded as being unusually tentative, which gave Olivier the opportunity to take him to the floor, where again, neither fighter was able to advance position or do anything of note. After three rounds, Olivier was declared the winner via unanimous decision.

At Cage Rage 24, Mann faced Jordan Miller, who took the fight at short notice. Mann was able to take Miller down almost immediately in the fight and took a rear naked choke. Mann dominated from that point and soon after, transitioned to a triangle choke after just 53 seconds of the first round.

After this, Cage Rage became defunct and Mann re-joined Cage Gladiators, immediately competing against Frederic Fernandez for the Cage Gladiators World Featherweight Championship at the Cage Gladiators 6 event. Mann was able to utilise his wrestling skills again, dominating the takedowns, neutralising his opponent. Mann was able to take the unanimous decision after effective striking, leading Sherdog to once again label him "a star in the making."

Mann was then scheduled to face future World Extreme Cagefighting standout Brad Pickett, though the fight was later cancelled after Pickett suffered a broken arm defending a high kick.

Mann instead took a fight in Croatia, defeating Ivica Djebic via TKO (injury). Returning to Cage Gladiators at the Cage Gladiators 8 event, Mann defeated Steve McCombe via submission (choke) in the first round.

=== Sengoku ===
Mann then signed with Sengoku Raiden Championship in Japan, to participate in their Featherweight Grand Prix. In the opening round, Mann faced Tetsuya Yamada and defeated him via unanimous decision (30–29, 30–29, 30–29). During the first round of the fight, Mann was able to land powerful punches, before falling into a deep kneebar attempt from Yamada. After escaping, Mann was able to gain top position to end the first round. The second round saw Yamada attempt a standing Kimura, which was fought off by Mann, who was later able to take down Yamada twice, whilst fighting off a second kimura attempt. The final round saw poor kickboxing attempts by Yamada, which was countered by two takedowns. Finally, Mann looked to utilise an ankle lock, which was reversed into another kneebar by Yamada. After the third round ended, Mann was declared the winner via decision.

In the quarter-finals of the tournament, Mann faced early tournament favourite, Hatsu Hioki who had previously defeated World Extreme Cagefighting veteran Chris Manuel. Mann weighed in at 142.6 lbs, whilst Hioki, who was unbeaten in his last seven fights, weighed in at 143.3 lbs. Mann stated that "[I] plan for an exciting and explosive fight."

During the fight, Mann was able to land several successful punches, before Hioki took Mann down with a trip, where he was able to land knees and execute a D'arce choke. After scrambling to avoid an armbar attempt, Mann fell to a triangle choke, tapping out at 3:09 of the first round. After the fight, Mann stated "I started off well, standing up, but I fell into his game. Fell into his trap. The punches were only small punches, but it was the triangle that was slowly coming on, so in the end, I tapped."

After his elimination from the Featherweight Grand Prix, Mann competed in his third fight in Sengoku against Shigeki Osawa, who Sherdog labelled a talented young prospect. After three rounds, Mann was victorious, via unanimous decision.

=== Move to North America ===
Mann still had one more fight left on his Sengoku contract and also expressed a desire to join World Extreme Cagefighting and eventually fight Featherweight Champion José Aldo.

Despite his contract with Sengoku, Mann went on to make his North American debut against Doug Evans on 11 September 2010 at Shark Fights 13. The bout saw Mann hit Evans with multiple combinations and low kicks, before utilising a flying knee. Evans counter-attacked with takedowns, which he kept up into the final round. Mann won the bout via split decision (47–48, 48–47, 48–47) to become the new Shark Fights Featherweight champion.

=== Bellator Fighting Championships ===
On 17 February, it was announced Mann had signed with Bellator Fighting Championships. He had his first fight for the promotion against Josh Arocho at Bellator 42. Mann was able to dominate the fight with superior wrestling and won the fight via unanimous decision (30-25, 30-27, 30-27).

That win earned Mann a place in the Bellator 2011 Summer Series Featherweight Tournament where he faced Adam Schindler at Bellator 46 in his quarter final match-up. Mann stuffed all attempts from the wrestler to take the fight to the ground before he scored a stunning first round KO win with a right uppercut left hook combination which dropped Schindler before swarming on him with hammerfists to leave him unconscious on the mat.

Mann faced Pat Curran in the Featherweight tournament semifinals at Bellator 47. He lost the fight via unanimous decision.

Mann fought Kenny Foster at Bellator 53 for a spot in the next Featherweight tournament. He dominated the stand-up but then got taken down which gave him the opportunity to finish via submission (triangle choke) in the first round.

Mann was defeated by Mike Corey via unanimous decision (29-28, 29-28, 29-28) in the Bellator Season Six Featherweight Tournament. In the first round he dropped Corey twice, but was outwrestled in the next two to lose the decision.

=== Cage Warriors ===
On 6 June 2013 Cage Warriors announced that they signed Mann to a five fight deal. He is scheduled to meet Jose Luis Zapater at Cage Warriors 57. And he would go on to defeat Zapater by way of TKO (punches) in the 1st round.

He next fought Marat Pekov at Cage Warriors Fight Night 9 on 25 October 2013. He won the fight via unanimous decision.

Mann faced Marcelo Costa at Cage Warriors 68 on 3 May 2014. Mann lost the fight via rear naked choke in the second round.

== Championships and accomplishments ==
- Shark Fights
  - Shark Fights Featherweight Championship (One time)

== Mixed martial arts record ==
Professional record breakdown
35 matches	25 wins	9 losses
By knockout	5	1
By submission	11	2
By decision	8	6
Unknown	1	0
Draws	1	

Res.	Record	Opponent	Method	Event	Date	Round	Time	Location	Notes
Loss	25–9–1	Damien Lapilus	Decision (unanimous)	BAMMA 28	24 February 2017	3	5:00	Belfast, Northern Island	For the vacant BAMMA World Featherweight Championship.
Win	25–8–1	Graham Turner	KO (punch)	BAMMA 25	14 May 2016	1	1:18	Birmingham, England, United Kingdom	
Loss	24–8–1	Shajidul Haque	Decision (unanimous)	M4TC 17: Long vs. Quinn	23 May 2015	3	5:00	Tyne and Wear, England, United Kingdom	For the vacant M4TC Bantamweight Championship.
Win	24–7–1	Moktar Benkaci	Decision (unanimous)	Cage Warriors 73	1 November 2014	3	5:00	Liverpool, England, United Kingdom	
Loss	23–7–1	Marcelo Costa	Submission (rear-naked choke)	Cage Warriors 68	3 May 2014	2	3:35	Liverpool, England, United Kingdom	
Win	23–6–1	Marat Pekov	Decision (unanimous)	Cage Warriors Fight Night 9	25 October 2013	3	5:00	Amman, Jordan	
Win	22–6–1	Jose Luis Zapater	TKO (punches)	Cage Warriors 57	20 July 2013	1	3:19	Liverpool, England, United Kingdom	
Loss	21–6–1	Rodrigo Lima	Decision (unanimous)	Bellator 94	28 March 2013	3	5:00	Tampa, Florida, United States	Bantamweight debut. Bellator Season 9 Bantamweight Tournament Qualifier.
Loss	21–5–1	Mike Corey	Decision (unanimous)	Bellator 60	9 March 2012	3	5:00	Hammond, Indiana, United States	Bellator Season 6 Featherweight Tournament quarter-final.
Win	21–4–1	Kenny Foster	Submission (triangle choke)	Bellator 53	8 October 2011	1	3:51	Miami, Oklahoma, United States	
Loss	20–4–1	Pat Curran	Decision (unanimous)	Bellator 47	23 July 2011	3	5:00	Rama, Ontario, Canada	Bellator 2011 Summer Series Featherweight Tournament semi-final.
Win	20–3–1	Adam Schindler	KO (punches)	Bellator 46	25 June 2011	1	4:14	Hollywood, Florida, United States	Bellator 2011 Summer Series Featherweight Tournament quarter-final.
Win	19–3–1	Josh Arocho	Decision (unanimous)	Bellator 42	23 April 2011	3	5:00	Newkirk, Oklahoma, United States	
Win	18–3–1	Doug Evans	Decision (split)	Shark Fights 13: Jardine vs Prangley	11 September 2010	5	5:00	Amarillo, Texas, United States	Won the Shark Fights Featherweight title.
Win	17–3–1	Shigeki Osawa	Decision (unanimous)	World Victory Road Presents: Sengoku 11	7 November 2009	3	5:00	Tokyo, Japan	
Loss	16–3–1	Hatsu Hioki	Submission (triangle choke)	World Victory Road Presents: Sengoku 8	2 May 2009	1	3:09	Tokyo, Japan	Sengoku Featherweight Grand Prix Second Round.
Win	16–2–1	Tetsuya Yamada	Decision (unanimous)	World Victory Road Presents: Sengoku 7	20 March 2009	3	5:00	Tokyo, Japan	Sengoku Featherweight Grand Prix Opening Round.
Win	15–2–1	Steve McCombe	Submission (choke)	Cage Gladiators 8	27 July 2008	1	N/A	England, United Kingdom	
Win	14–2–1	Ivica Djebic	TKO (injury)	WFC 5 - Noc Gladiatora	19 April 2008	N/A	N/A	Dubrovnik, Croatia	
Win	13–2–1	Frederic Fernandez	Decision (unanimous)	Cage Gladiators 6	2 March 2008	3	5:00	Liverpool, England, United Kingdom	Won the Cage Gladiators Featherweight World Championship.
Win	12–2–1	Jordan Miller	Submission (triangle choke)	Cage Rage 24	1 December 2007	1	0:53	London, England, United Kingdom	
Loss	11–2–1	Robbie Olivier	Decision (unanimous)	Cage Rage 22	14 July 2007	3	5:00	London, England, United States	For the Cage Rage British Featherweight Championship.
Win	11–1–1	Ashleigh Grimshaw	Decision (split)	Cage Rage 20	10 February 2007	3	5:00	London, England, United Kingdom	
Win	10–1–1	Chris Freeborn	Submission (triangle choke)	Cage Gladiators 3	3 December 2006	1	2:46	Liverpool, England, United Kingdom	
Win	9–1–1	Denas Banevicius	Submission (strikes)	Cage Gladiators 2	3 September 2006	1	1:42	Liverpool, England, United Kingdom	
Draw	8–1–1	Ashleigh Grimshaw	Draw (majority)	Cage Rage Contenders	28 May 2006	3	5:00	London, England, United Kingdom	
Win	8–1	Harold Roder	Submission (armbar)	Staredown City	5 February 2006	1	N/A	Oostzaan, Holland	
Win	7–1	Kyle Davis	Submission (triangle choke)	House of Pain - Fight Night 4	3 December 2005	1	0:44	Cardiff, Wales, United Kingdom	
Loss	6–1	Allan Lee	TKO (punches)	Intense Fighting	22 October 2005	2	1:18	Cambridge, England, United Kingdom	
Win	6–0	Marco Dritty	Submission (triangle choke)	Urban Destruction 2	30 July 2005	1	N/A	Bristol, England, United Kingdom	
Win	5–0	Gary Howe	Submission (choke)	Urban Destruction 1	10 April 2005	1	N/A	Bristol, England, United Kingdom	
Win	4–0	Aaron Blackwell	Submission (armbar)	Anarchy Fight Night	20 February 2005	1	4:11	England, United Kingdom	
Win	3–0	Abdul Bahaj	KO (punches)	IMA - Fight Mix	19 December 2004	1	1:36	Landsmeer, Holland	
Win	2–0	Nayeb Hezam	Submission (triangle choke)	Shooto Holland - Knockout Gala 3	28 March 2004	1	0:56	Vlissingen, Holland	
Win	1–0	Andy Dicks	Submission (triangle choke)	Grapple and Strike 8	22 November 2003	N/A	N/A	Kidderminster, England, United Kingdom	

== See also ==
- List of male mixed martial artists
