= Shannon Ritch =

American mixed martial arts fighter (born 1970)

- Born: September 27, 1970 (age 56); Coolidge, Arizona, U.S.
- Other names: The Cannon
- Height: 5 ft 9 in (1.75 m)
- Weight: 221 lb (100 kg; 15.8 st)
- Division: Heavyweight (2016–present); Light Heavyweight; Middleweight; Welterweight
- Reach: 71 in (180 cm)
- Style: Boxing, Judo, Taekwondo, Brazilian Jiu-Jitsu, Karate, Wrestling
- Stance: Orthodox
- Fighting out of: Glendale, Arizona
- Team: Cannon Jiu-Jitsu; RCJ Machado Jiu-Jitsu; Lion's Den (1996–2001); Team Punishment (2002–2005)
- Rank: 3rd degree black belt in Brazilian Jiu-Jitsu black belt in Karate
- Years active: 1998-2020

Professional boxing record
- Total: 1
- Losses: 1

Kickboxing record
- Total: 27
- Wins: 20
- Losses: 7
- By knockout: 7
- Draws: 0

Mixed martial arts record
- Total: 150
- Wins: 58
- By knockout: 11
- By submission: 45
- By disqualification: 2
- Losses: 88
- By knockout: 39
- By submission: 49
- No contests: 4

Other information
- Mixed martial arts record from Sherdog
- Last updated on: March 2016

Shannon Ritch (born September 27, 1970) is an American professional mixed martial artist, boxer, grappler, professional wrestler and kickboxer. In mixed martial arts competition he is the former King of the Cage Middleweight Champion and the inaugural BKFC International Heavyweight Champion in bare-knuckle boxing. A professional competitor since 1998, Ritch has competed for M-1 Global, Combate Americas, MFC, Shark Fights, Pancrase, Battlarts, K-1, Bare Knuckle Fighting Championship, PRIDE, Rebel Fighting Championship, New Japan Pro-Wrestling, King of the Cage, Gladiator Challenge, Hart Legacy Wrestling and the WEC.

== Early life and education ==
Ritch was born in Coolidge, Arizona and was raised "dirt poor" on a farm in Randolph. Ritch began learning karate from a young age and also competed in high school wrestling before becoming a professional kickboxer beginning as an amateur sometime in 1988. Ritch attended Central Arizona College and Arizona State University.

== Career ==
Shannon had a brief stint in the United States Army with the 4th Infantry Regiment, which ended in 1996 before being employed by the private military organization Blackwater. With Blackwater, he was deployed to Kuwait, Iraq and Afghanistan which served as a launch pad for his training in Brazilian jiu-jitsu and later transition to a career in professional mixed martial arts. Shannon started training Brazilian jiu-jitsu in 1996 and received his black belt in 2007 under Dan G. at the Machado Jiu-Jitsu Academy in Dallas, Texas. Ritch still trains military personnel in mixed martial arts and is a mainstay at the Marine Corps Air Station Yuma. At one time Shannon was a bodyguard for United States Congressman John Negroponte while serving as a private contractor under Blackwater.

== Mixed martial arts career ==
=== Early career ===
Ritch made his debut in 1991 at an event in Mexico, but like much of his fighting career this was during a time when sanctioned fights took place under athletic commissions that kept no record of mixed martial arts competitions. Ritch's officially documented professional debut was in 1998. Shannon's full record has over 200 professional MMA fights with 124 wins, 92 losses and 2 draws (4 NC's), some fights going undocumented and dating back as far as 1991, his documented record of fights goes back to 1998 with a record of 58 wins and 88 losses (4 NC's).

=== PRIDE ===
Ritch compiled a record of 13-16 (1) with notable wins in the Super Brawl promotion in Hawaii and single night tournaments in Texas before being signed by the PRIDE Fighting Championships in Japan. He made his debut in the organization on October 31, 2000, at PRIDE 11 against the legendary Japanese fighter Kazushi Sakuraba. Ritch lost via achilles lock submission at 1:08 into the fight.

After impressing PRIDE brass with his showmanship, Ritch made his next appearance for the organization at PRIDE The Best Vol. 2 on July 20, 2002, against A-class shootist, Daisuke Nakamura and lost via armbar submission in the first round.

=== Pancrase ===
In 2004 Shannon drew interest from Pancrase after his wins over The Ultimate Fighter cast members Ray Elbe and Eddy Ellis that same year, his Pancrase debut would be against PRIDE and UFC veteran Yuki Kondo at Pancrase: Brave 6 in a losing effort. He would later take on professional wrestler and MMA journeyman Hikaru Sato at Pancrase 269, their inaugural event on UFC Fight Pass, in 2015 losing the fight. Despite these loses Ritch maintains a partnership with Pancrase occasionally appearing at the Pancrase Gym in Japan to host training seminars and even appearing in the Pancrase energy drink line.

=== King of the Cage ===
Ritch holds a record of 2–14 in 16 fights for King of the Cage and despite his record within the promotion he is a former KOTC Middleweight Champion after defeating Canadian veteran Elmer Waterhen via submission in the first round, making his third title defense before dropping the title to Ritch, Shannon later lost the title to Garrett Davis.

=== Gender Wars MMA ===
In 2018 Shannon took part in an event promoted by former UFC fighter Brad Kohler, taking place in Russia with no audience and no ring or cage. The card featured a main event with a woman taking on a man in a mixed martial arts exhibition fight and the winner supposedly taking a US$1 million purse. Ritch opened the card in a heavyweight bout against professional wrestler Jerry "J-Rocc" Mires, making his mixed martial arts debut, Ritch won the fight in the first round after quickly taking Mires down and submitting him with a straight armbar.

=== Diamond World Fights ===
On October 5, 2018, Ritch was to fight in the main event of DWF: MMA Mega Showdown in Delaware against professional wrestler Michael Youngblood, who briefly competed for the WWE and held a 1-0 pro record after beginning his mixed martial arts career earlier in the year, for the DWF Heavyweight Championship and co-headlined by former UFC contender Mike Bronzoulis against veteran Marcus Gaines who is also an occasional training partner with Shannon. After the fighters who were set to compete on the card had conducted the pre fight press conference and weigh-ins to promote the event were later informed as the main card was set to begin that the promoters who made an investment for the card to take place did not have enough funds to pay the fighters and staff and that an announcement would be made to the attendance that their tickets would have to be refunded. The promoter behind the DWF organization, Gail Stallings-Minor who purportedly was the first African-American woman to promote a mixed martial arts event, left the venue after learning the fighters had to be told they would not be paid and that state police had arrived. Bellator MMA Women's Flyweight Champion Ilima-Lei Macfarlane, who was cornering a fighter on the card, later described the venue as "complete chaos" after watching the promoters rush to flee the scene as police began to enter.

=== Road to ONE: RUF Nation ===
Ritch was scheduled to face fellow mixed martial arts veteran Aaron Brink in the main event of Road to ONE: RUF 44 on October 23, 2021, the event was a cross promotion between RUF and ONE Championship. However, Brink later withdrew from the fight and was replaced by Samson Guerrero. Ritch won by submission via rear-naked choke.

== Grappling ==
Shannon has found success as a grappler winning multiple NAGA, Grapplers Quest and IBJJF competitions, most recently winning a gold medal in the heavyweight division at the UAEJJF Pro Jiu-Jitsu Championships '17 in Phoenix, Arizona, a gold medal at the Grand Canyon 2017 BJJ Open in the super heavyweight division, 2 gold medals in Gi and No-Gi heavyweight masters division at the SJJIF World Jiu-Jitsu Championship in Long Beach and a silver medal at the '17 Arizona State BJJ Championships. Ritch has notable bouts in submission grappling against Rodrigo Gracie at a NAGA/Gracie Academy hosted event in 2007, Ben Askren at the 2009 FILA USA World's, Ron Keslar at the SJJIF 2017 Worlds, Robert Drysdale black belt and QUINTET competitor Marcelo Nunes at Submission Hunter Pro 22 that ended in a draw and Jeff Monson in a 2016 no-gi bout that took place in Russia.

== Bare-knuckle boxing ==
Ritch began his bare-knuckle boxing career in the mid-1990s competing in an arena known as the Plaza del Toro in Nogales, Sonora, Mexico. Ritch currently holds a 26–3 record in bare-knuckle boxing with all of his wins coming by way of knockout, and ranked as the #8 heavyweight bare knuckle fighter in the world as of 2019. In 2016 Shannon was to fight against boxing superstar Bobby Gunn for the coveted Police Gazette Diamond Heavyweight Championship and the winner receiving a $100,000 win bonus, the bout never materialized.

=== BKB ===
Shannon later had a bare knuckle fight in 2018 for the BKB promotion in the UK against Canadian fighter Jack Draper at BKB 6 hosted at the O2 Arena, losing in the second round after a controversial TKO.

=== Bare Knuckle Fighting Championship ===
Ritch is set to fight again in bare-knuckle boxing in 2019 for the Bare Knuckle Fighting Championships at BKFC 4 against Omar Molina in Cancun, Mexico, Shannon would go on to win the fight via knockout in 26 seconds of round 1.

== Professional wrestling career ==
=== Battlarts (2001) ===
Ritch made his pro wrestling debut in October 2001 for the Battlarts promotion against UWFi veteran Daijiro Matsui at the event Battlarts Yuki-Bom-Be-Ye ‘01 losing via pinfall.

=== New Japan Pro Wrestling (2003) ===
In 2003 Ritch was signed to a one year developmental contract with New Japan Pro Wrestling and had one match against Rocky Romero that ended in a double count out after both wrestlers brawled outside the ring past the time limit given by the referee.

=== WrestleFanFest (2007) ===
Shannon took part in the “Night of Indy’s” battle royal match in 2007 at the WrestleFanFest Malice in the Palace event in Daly City, California, the event was slated to also feature mixed martial arts fights and took place at the Cow Palace a venue known for hosting MMA events. He would go on to win the match after eliminating the final two opponents in the 20-man battle royal, Timothy Thatcher and former WWE Cruiserweight Champion Chavo Classic.

=== Championship Wrestling from Hollywood (2018) ===
Shannon signed a one match deal with Championship Wrestling from Hollywood in their 2018 event in China to appear on the undercard against Wenbo Liu in a rematch from a 2017 MMA fight, Ritch would go on to lose this match via disqualification after he brought a steel chair into the ring.

=== Hart Legacy Wrestling (2020–present) ===
In 2020 Shannon announced his return to pro wrestling and that he was signed to appear in a 2-month tour with Canadian promotion HLW. He made his debut in a match against The New Hart Foundation member Kenny Lester on February 20 in Wabasca, Alberta, Canada and won via pinfall after a distraction from Ken Shamrock.

On March 26, 2022, Ritch returned to HLW in their debut live event on FITE TV in Elmira, New York and won the HLW Showdown Championship after defeating TJ Epixx by submission with an ankle lock.

== Personal life ==
Ritch has been featured in two episodes of Walker, Texas Ranger as a Biker Gang Member and a character named Knight, Choke in 2011 as an extra, CSI Las Vegas as Thug #2, CSI: Crime Scene Investigation as Cage Fighter #1, an episode of iCarly as a MMA Fighter, an episode of Numbers in 2010, an episode of Ultimate Soldier Challenge on the History Channel representing a military contracting company and most recently in 2017 the direct to DVD film, directed by Robert Parham and Warren Foster, Bullets, Blades and Blood and upcoming in 2018 No Way Out directed by Jeffrey D. Parker, distributed by New Vision Films. In 2017 Shannon started filming of a biopic centered around his mixed martial arts career, through HBO films, titled The Real Last Samurai and to be released exclusively on HBO in late 2019. In 2021 Shannon will be co-starring alongside Mickey Rourke and Donald Cerrone in The Commando.

Ritch is also an avid golf player, winning 1st place in many state and pro am competitions held within his native Arizona as recent as 2017. Shannon won 2 Veterans Golfing Association 1st place medals in 2018 and again in 2019, the tournament is hosted by the United States Golf Association.

In June 2024, Ritch was involved in a fatal shooting in Arizona. He claimed self-defense, stating the incident occurred during an altercation. Authorities investigated, and no formal charges were filed.

== Lethwei ==
In July 2001, Ritch was invited to compete under Lethwei rules at the "International Myanmar traditional boxing challenge & Myanmar-Australia talent testing boxing competition" in Yangon, Myanmar.

Ritch was matched against the Burmese fighter Ei Htee Kaw in a fight held at a contract weight of 165 lb the Thuwunna National Indoor Stadium. Ritch started the fight strong and forced his opponent to be defensive. In a controversial moment, Ritch knocked down Ei Htee Kaw in the first round but a count was not administered. Ritch continued to attack with Ei Htee Kaw trying to defend. At one point, Ei Htee Kaw turned away and raised his knee in defence, pointing his knee forward. Ritch struck himself on Ei Htee Kaw's knee unintentionally, driving it directly into his solar plexus. Unable to breathe, Ritch went down immediately without Ei Htee Kaw throwing a shot and the fight was declared over.

== Lethwei record ==
Professional Lethwei record
0 wins (0 (T)KOs), 1 loss, 0 draws
Date	Result	Opponent	Event	Location	Method	Round	Time
2001-06-09	Loss	(Myanmar) Ei Htee Kaw	International Challenge Fights, Thuwunna NIS(1)	Yangon, Myanmar	TKO	1	
Legend: Win Loss Draw/No contest Notes

== Kickboxing record ==
Kickboxing record
0 wins, 2 losses (2 KOs), 0 draws
Date	Result	Opponent	Event	Location	Method	Round	Time
2002-08-17	Loss	(United States) Brian Schwartz	K-1 World Grand Prix 2002 in Las Vegas	Las Vegas, Nevada, USA	KO	2	1:40
2001-08-11	Loss	(United States) Frank Shamrock	K-1 World Grand Prix 2001 in Las Vegas	Las Vegas, Nevada, USA	TKO (broken arm)	1	0:53
Legend: Win Loss Draw/No contest Notes

== Mixed martial arts record ==
Professional record breakdown
150 matches	58 wins	88 losses
By knockout	11	39
By submission	45	49
By disqualification	2	0
No contests	4	

Res.	Record	Opponent	Method	Event	Date	Round	Time	Location	Notes
Loss	58–88 (4)	Glenn Sparv	Submission (calf slicer)	REBEL FC X: A New Order	January 11, 2020	1	1:31	Moscow, Russia	
Loss	58–87 (4)	Simon Carson	TKO (knees and punches)	Battlefield FC 2	July 27, 2019	1	3:34	Macau, China	
Win	58–86 (4)	Manuel Chacon Camarena	TKO (punches)	Imperio MMA: Rocky Point Beach Bash	July 20, 2019	1	0:36	Puerto Penasco, Mexico	
Loss	57–86 (4)	Travis Fulton	Submission (forearm choke)	M-1 Global: Road to M-1 USA 2	April 4, 2019	2	0:41	Winterhaven, California, United States	For The M-1 Global Super Fight World Championship
Win	57–85 (4)	Eriko Vasquez	Submission (heel hook)	Imperio MMA 8: Honor and Glory	December 8, 2017	2	0:38	Tampico, Mexico	
Loss	56-85 (4)	Wenbo Liu	TKO (punches)	REBEL FC 6: China vs. The World	September 2, 2017	1	4:18	Shenzhen, China	
Win	56–84 (4)	Omar Jimenez	KO (head kick)	Imperio MMA 7	July 9, 2017	2	3:15	Tijuana, Mexico	
Loss	55–84 (4)	Samson Guerrero	TKO (submission to punches)	World Fighting Federation 34	June 3, 2017	2	0:41	Chandler, Arizona, United States	
Loss	55–83 (4)	Josh Appelt	TKO (punches)	Gladiator Challenge: Contenders	May 20, 2017	1	1:08	Lincoln, California, United States	For the Gladiator Challenge Heavyweight Championship.
Loss	55–82 (4)	Vitaly Shemetov	KO (punches)	The Legend King Championship 2	April 29, 2017	1	2:53	Zhuhai, China	
Loss	55–81 (4)	Tony Lopez	Submission (guillotine choke)	Combate Americas 6	April 25, 2016	1	1:45	Los Angeles, California, United States	Fought at Catchweight (210 lbs).
Win	55–80 (4)	Alejandro Baez	Submission (heel hook)	Imperio MMA: Spring Break Brawl	March 26, 2016	1	4:20	Tijuana, Mexico	
Win	54–80 (4)	Mavrick Harvey	Submission (rear-naked choke)	UR Fight 1	March 20, 2016	1	1:32	Phoenix, Arizona, United States	Return to Middleweight.
Loss	53–80 (4)	Diego Herzog	TKO (punches)	IFC 35: California Caged Combat	September 26, 2015	1	0:44	Brooks, California, United States	
Loss	53–79 (4)	Hikaru Sato	Submission (armbar)	Pancrase 269	August 9, 2015	1	1:36	Tokyo, Japan	
Loss	53–78 (4)	Shonie Carter	TKO (injury)	Super Brawl Showdown 1	January 30, 2015	1	5:00	Phoenix, Arizona, United States	
Win	53–77 (4)	Roman Sierra	Submission (rear-naked choke)	Imperio MMA	June 15, 2013	1	1:42	Tampico, Mexico	
Win	52–77 (4)	Darren McNamee	Submission (can opener)	IFC MMA: USA vs. UK	March 9, 2013	1	1:08	Hampshire, England	Won IFC Middleweight Championship.
Loss	51–77 (4)	Leeroy Fornoff	TKO (punches)	Rage in the Cage 164	November 16, 2012	1	2:55	Chandler, Arizona, United States	
Win	51–76 (4)	Duncan Wilson	Submission (rear-naked choke)	Fivestar Fight League 2: Origins	October 19, 2012	1	0:20	Prince George, British Columbia, Canada	
Win	50–76 (4)	Ivan Guillen	Submission (rear-naked choke)	Mexico Fighter 4	July 14, 2012	1	0:59	Sonora, Mexico	Won Mexico Fighter Middleweight Championship.
Win	49–76 (4)	Rudy Aguilar	TKO (punches)	Rage In The Cage 160	June 22, 2012	1	1:04	Chandler, Arizona, United States	
Loss	48–76 (4)	Joe Riggs	TKO (punches)	Duel for Domination: Extravaganza	November 26, 2011	1	0:56	Phoenix, Arizona, United States	
Loss	48–75 (4)	Joe Cronin	TKO (punches)	Rage In The Cage 156	October 22, 2011	2	1:24	Chandler, Arizona, United States	
Win	48–74 (4)	Scott Guenther	KO (punch)	Rage In The Cage 148	January 29, 2011	1	0:20	Chandler, Arizona, United States	Won vacant RITC Middleweight Championship.
Win	47–74 (4)	Chuy Torres	Submission (heel hook)	Combate Extremo: Ritch vs. Torres	December 11, 2010	1	N/A	Monterrey, Nuevo Leon, Mexico	
Win	46–74 (4)	Richard Frye	Submission (armbar)	Rage In The Cage 147	December 4, 2010	1	1:45	Phoenix, Arizona, United States	
Loss	45–74 (4)	Cody Krahn	TKO (groin injury)	KOTC 48	November 21, 2010	1	2:35	Edmonton, Alberta, Canada	
Loss	45–73 (4)	Ray Elbe	Technical Submission (triangle choke)	Martial Combat 11	October 15, 2010	1	0:57	Sentosa, Singapore	
Loss	45–72 (4)	Chris Kizuik	TKO (punches)	KOTC: Sentinel	September 18, 2010	1	2:52	Cold Lake, Alberta, Canada	
Loss	45–71 (4)	Mike Moritz	TKO (submission to punches)	Rage In The Cage 143	July 31, 2010	1	2:38	Phoenix, Arizona, United States	
Loss	45–70 (4)	Garrett Davis	TKO (punches)	KOTC: Combustion	May 28, 2010	1	3:17	Edmonton, Alberta, Canada	Lost the KOTC Middleweight Championship.
Loss	45–69 (4)	Bill Mahood	TKO (submission to punches)	KOTC: Fearless	April 24, 2010	1	1:00	Penticton, British Columbia, Canada	For the KOTC Canada Light Heavyweight Championship.
Loss	45–68 (4)	Antonio Zamora	Submission (rear-naked choke)	New Mexico Cage Fighting	April 17, 2010	1	1:17	Albuquerque, New Mexico, United States	
Loss	45–67 (4)	Jared Brussemakers	TKO (punches)	KOTC: Thunderstruck 2	March 18, 2010	1	2:09	Calgary, Alberta, Canada	Non-title bout.
Win	45–66 (4)	Elmer Waterhen	Submission (toe hold)	KOTC: Nailbiter	January 22, 2010	1	0:54	Edmonton, Alberta, Canada	Won the KOTC Middleweight Championship.
Win	44–66 (4)	Marcus Gaines	Submission (armbar)	National Cage Fighting	October 9, 2009	1	0:43	Tucson, Arizona, United States	
Loss	43–66 (4)	Jose Landi-Jons	TKO (punches)	Shark Fights 5.5: Nothing To Lose	July 18, 2009	1	0:08	Edmonton, Alberta, Canada	
Loss	43–65 (4)	Joey Rivera	TKO (injury)	KOTC: Legends	June 6, 2009	1	1:17	Winterhaven, California, United States	
Loss	43–64 (4)	TJ Waldburger	Submission (armbar)	Shark Fights 4	May 2, 2009	1	1:37	Lubbock, Texas, United States	For the vacant Shark Fights Welterweight Championship.
Loss	43–63 (4)	Eric Davila	Submission (arm-triangle choke)	Shark Fights 3	March 14, 2009	1	1:15	Amarillo, Texas, United States	
Win	43–62 (4)	John Wood	KO (head kick)	Shark Fights 2	December 13, 2008	1	0:15	Amarillo, Texas, United States	
Win	42–62 (4)	John Wood	Submission (heel hook)	Shark Fights 1	October 24, 2008	1	0:47	Amarillo, Texas, United States	
Win	41–62 (4)	Danny Bennett	Submission (armbar)	CageSport MMA	August 30, 2008	1	0:37	Tacoma, Washington, United States	Won vacant CageSport Welterweight Championship.
Win	40–62 (4)	Joe Vigil	Submission (rear-naked choke)	XP3: The Proving Ground	July 26, 2008	1	1:00	Houston, Texas, United States	Won XP3 Interim Welterweight Championship.
Loss	39–62 (4)	Todd Medina	Submission (rear-naked choke)	Strike FC: Night of Gladiators	April 18, 2008	1	4:56	Ploieti, Romania	
Win	39–61 (4)	Jasper Lockett	Submission (triangle choke)	CCCF: Battle on the Border	March 29, 2008	1	1:02	Newkirk, Oklahoma, United States	
NC	38–61 (4)	Brian Ebersole	NC (overturned by CSAC)	Malice at Cow Palace	September 9, 2006	1	3:46	San Francisco, California, United States	
Win	38–61 (3)	Vincent Perez	Submission (armbar)	Valor Fighting: 4th and B	August 19, 2006	1	0:49	San Diego, California, United States	Won Valor Fighting Welterweight Championship.
Win	37–61 (3)	Vincent Perez	Submission (armbar)	War Zone 1	July 7, 2006	1	1:47	Houston, Texas, United States	
Loss	36–61 (3)	Garret Davis	Submission (rear-naked choke)	KOTC: Widowmaker	June 18, 2006	1	N/A	Edmonton, Alberta, Canada	
Loss	36–60 (3)	Maverick Harvey	TKO (knee)	Valor Fighting: Showdown at 4th and B	April 29, 2006	1	1:42	San Diego, California, United States	
Loss	36–59 (3)	Andy Maccarone	TKO (submission to punches)	KOTC: Heavy Hitters	April 2, 2006	1	2:28	California, United States	
Loss	36–58 (3)	Sammy Morgan	Submission (toe hold)	KOTC: The Return	March 19, 2006	1	1:29	San Jacinto, California, United States	
Loss	36–57 (3)	Brock Larson	TKO (punches)	Extreme Challenge 66	April 2, 2006	1	1:16	Medina, Minnesota, United States	
Loss	36–56 (3)	Chris Brennan	Submission (triangle choke and elbows)	RM 7: Championship Night	December 11, 2005	1	N/A	Tijuana, Mexico	
Loss	36–55 (3)	Maverick Harvey	TKO (injury)	Kage Kombat	November 12, 2005	1	N/A	California, United States	
Loss	36–54 (3)	Alex Schoenauer	Submission (guillotine choke)	SF 13: Rocky Mountain Sportfight	October 15, 2005	1	0:29	Denver, Colorado, United States	
Loss	36–53 (3)	John Alessio	TKO (punches)	KOTC 58: Prime Time	August 5, 2005	1	0:41	San Jacinto, California, United States	
Loss	36–52 (3)	Kengo Ura	Submission (heel hook)	Valor Fighting: Medford Mayhem	July 16, 2005	1	1:04	Medford, Oregon, United States	
Win	36–51 (3)	Robert Sarkozi	DQ (illegal kick)	KOTC 56: Caliente	July 9, 2005	1	1:53	Globe, Arizona, United States	Illegal strikes
Loss	35–51 (3)	Dan Severn	Submission (choke)	Extreme Wars: X-1	July 2, 2005	2	1:05	Honolulu, Hawaii, United States	
Loss	35–50 (3)	Mario Stapel	Submission (armbar)	KOTC 55: Grudge Match	June 17, 2005	1	4:43	Albuquerque, New Mexico, United States	
Loss	35–49 (3)	Dan Severn	Submission (keylock)	Northern Fighting Championships	June 3, 2005	2	N/A	Alaska, United States	
Win	35–48 (3)	James Murdock	Submission (heel hook)	International Extreme Fight Challenge	May 3, 2005	1	1:26	Anchorage, Alaska, United States	
Loss	34–48 (3)	Rich Guerin	Submission (verbal)	XFC: Dome of Destruction	April 30, 2005	1	2:32	Tacoma, Washington, United States	
Loss	34–47 (3)	Bradley Glass	Submission (armbar)	GLFL: Brawl for All 7	March 19, 2005	1	3:24	Centerville, Ohio, United States	
Win	34–46 (3)	Ron Haskett	Submission (choke)	International Extreme Fight Challenge	February 21, 2005	1	0:26	Anchorage, Alaska, United States	
Win	33–46 (3)	Fletcher Siever	Submission (armbar)	PNRF: Explosion	July 16, 2004	1	3:22	Santa Fe, New Mexico, United States	
Loss	32–46 (3)	Yuki Kondo	Submission (kneebar)	Pancrase: Brave 6	June 22, 2004	1	1:01	Tokyo, Japan	
Win	32–45 (3)	Daryl Guthmiller	Technical Submission (armbar)	Extreme Challenge 58	June 11, 2004	1	1:36	Medina, Minnesota, United States	
Win	31–45 (3)	Eddy Ellis	Submission (armbar)	Lords of the Cage	June 5, 2004	1	1:29	Anacortes, Washington, United States	
Loss	30–45 (3)	James Fanshier	Submission (heel hook)	GC 26	June 2, 2004	1	2:34	Colusa, California, United States	
Win	30–44 (3)	Stacy Hakes	KO (kick)	XCF: Evolution	May 28, 2004	1	0:11	Phoenix, Arizona, United States	
Win	29–44 (3)	Danny Anderson	Submission (armbar)	EC 57	May 6, 2004	1	1:50	Council Bluffs, Iowa, United States	
Win	28–44 (3)	Chris Peak	Submission (heel hook)	Enter the Beast	March 6, 2004	1	0:37	Nanaimo, British Columbia, Canada	
Loss	27–44 (3)	Hector Ramirez	KO (punches)	Pit Fighting Championship	February 7, 2004	1	N/A	Upland, California, United States	
Win	27–43 (3)	Ray Elbe	Submission (heel hook)	King of the Rockies	January 3, 2004	1	1:10	Fort Collins, Colorado, United States	
Win	26–43 (3)	Reggie Cardiel	Submission (armbar)	XXXtreme Impact	December 28, 2003	1	1:23	Tijuana, Mexico	
Loss	25–43 (3)	Masanori Suda	Submission (triangle choke)	Super Brawl 32	December 15, 2003	1	1:02	Honolulu, Hawaii, United States	
Loss	25–42 (3)	Kyle Brees	Submission (armbar)	Xtreme Cage Fighting	November 22, 2003	1	1:32	Lake Havasu City, Arizona, United States	
Win	25–41 (3)	Fernando Rodriguez	Submission (armbar)	Ultimate Fighting Mexico	November 15, 2003	1	N/A	Monterrey, Mexico	
Loss	24–41 (3)	Steve Headden	TKO	ISCF: Trauma	October 25, 2003	1	1:42	Dalton, Georgia, United States	
Loss	24–40 (3)	Ross Ebañez	TKO (injury)	ROTR 3: Rumble on the Rock 3	August 9, 2003	1	5:00	Hilo, Hawaii, United States	
Win	24–39 (3)	Robert Maldonado	Submission (armbar)	ECS: Evolution	July 19, 2003	1	0:25	Phoenix, Arizona, United States	
Win	23–39 (3)	Matvey Baranov	TKO (elbows)	World Absolute Fighting Championship	June 7, 2003	1	1:32	Chabarovsk, Russia	
Win	22–39 (3)	Jafar Sultanaliev	Submission (armbar)	World Absolute Fighting Championship	June 7, 2003	1	0:52	Chabarovsk, Russia	
Loss	21–39 (3)	Miguel Gutierrez	Submission (heel hook)	Cage Fighting Monterrey	May 23, 2003	1	N/A	Monterrey, Mexico	
Win	21–38 (3)	Ruben Escamilla	Submission (leglock)	Showdown at McGee Park	May 5, 2003	1	0:50	Farmington, New Mexico, United States	
Win	20–38 (3)	Eddie Bartot	Submission (armbar)	Showdown at McGee Park	May 5, 2003	1	0:18	Farmington, New Mexico, United States	
NC	19–38 (3)	Renato Verissimo	NC (accidental clash of heads)	Rumble on the Rock 2	March 15, 2003	1	3:09	Hilo, Hawaii, United States	Fight stopped due to illegal headbutt.
Loss	19–38 (2)	Evan Tanner	Submission (triangle choke)	Fight against Cancer	February 15, 2003	1	N/A	Portland, Oregon, United States	
Win	19–37 (2)	David Klein	KO (kick)	RITC 44: Feel the Power	February 1, 2003	1	0:09	Casa Grande, Arizona, United States	
Loss	18–37 (2)	Nino Marroquin	TKO (injury)	Cage Fighting Monterrey	January 30, 2003	1	N/A	Monterrey, Mexico	
Loss	18–36 (2)	Wes Combs	TKO	PFC: Super Bash	January 10, 2003	1	N/A	California, United States	
Win	18–35 (2)	Kaleo Padilla	Submission (armbar)	Rumble on the Rock 1	December 28, 2002	1	4:20	Hilo, Hawaii, United States	
Loss	17–35 (2)	Diego Sanchez	Submission (rear-naked choke)	KOTC 20: Crossroads	December 25, 2002	1	N/A	Bernalillo, New Mexico, United States	
Win	17–34 (2)	Matt Horning	Submission (heel hook)	HHCF 4: Thanksgiving Throwdown	November 30, 2002	1	N/A	Circleville, Ohio, United States	
Win	16–34 (2)	John Lansing	Submission (rear-naked choke)	RITC 40: Casa Grande	November 9, 2002	1	0:55	Casa Grande, Arizona, United States	
Loss	15–34 (2)	Brian Ebersole	TKO (punch)	Ultimate Fighting Mexico	October 26, 2002	1	3:40	Monterrey, Mexico	
Loss	15–33 (2)	Edwin Dewees	Submission (armbar)	RITC 38: Let's Roll	September 7, 2002	1	1:12	Phoenix, Arizona, United States	
Loss	15–32 (2)	Chris Brennan	Submission (armbar)	Aztec Challenge 1	September 6, 2002	1	4:50	Ciudad Juárez, Mexico	
Win	15–31 (2)	Jeff Rogers	TKO (knees)	RITC 37	July 27, 2002	1	1:02	Phoenix, Arizona, United States	
Loss	14–31 (2)	Daisuke Nakamura	Submission (armbar)	PRIDE The Best Vol.2	July 20, 2002	1	4:28	Tokyo, Japan	
NC	14–30 (2)	Cedric Marks	No Contest	World Fighting Championships 1	June 26, 2002	1	N/A	San Antonio, Texas, United States	
Loss	14–30 (1)	Joe Merit	KO (knee)	KOTC 14: 5150	June 19, 2002	1	1:46	Bernalillo, New Mexico, United States	
Loss	14–29 (1)	Jared Rollins	Submission	California Pancration Championships	June 11, 2002	1	2:33	Los Angeles, California, United States	
Loss	14–28 (1)	Sherk Julian	TKO (submission to punches)	WEC 3	June 7, 2002	1	1:57	Lemoore, California, United States	
Loss	14–27 (1)	Jason MacDonald	Submission (rear-naked choke)	MFC 4: New Groundz	June 1, 2002	1	2:45	Calgary, Alberta, Canada	
Loss	14–26 (1)	Jeremy Williams	TKO (submission to strikes)	FFC 1	May 18, 2002	1	3:00	Honolulu, Hawaii, United States	
Loss	14–25 (1)	Benji Radach	TKO (punches)	MFC 3: Canadian Pride	March 3, 2002	1	1:18	Grande Prairie, Alberta	
Loss	14–24 (1)	Brian Dunn	Submission (armbar)	Rock'n'Rumble 1	December 29, 2001	1	1:35	United States	
Loss	14–23 (1)	Ronald Jhun	TKO (punches)	Warriors Quest 3	December 1, 2001	1	2:17	Hawaii, United States	
Loss	14–22 (1)	Henry Matamoros	Submission (armbar)	IHC 3: Exodus	November 10, 2001	1	0:47	Illinois, United States	
Loss	14–21 (1)	James Upshur	Submission (armbar)	Rage in the Cage 30	September 26, 2001	1	0:38	Phoenix, Arizona, United States	
Loss	14–20 (1)	Mark Weir	Submission (choke)	MB 3: Independence Day	July 1, 2001	1	N/A	England	
Loss	14–19 (1)	Katsumi Usuta	Submission (heel hook)	KOTC 9: Showtime	June 23, 2001	1	2:20	San Jacinto, California, United States	
Win	14–18 (1)	Erik Johnston	Submission (armbar)	Total Kombat	May 13, 2001	1	4:23	McAllen, Texas, United States	
Loss	13–18 (1)	John Renken	Submission (heel hook)	Bushido 1	January 18, 2001	1	N/A	Tempe, Arizona, United States	
Loss	13–17 (1)	Kazushi Sakuraba	Submission (achilles lock)	PRIDE 11: Battle of the Rising Sun	October 31, 2000	1	1:08	Osaka, Japan	
Loss	13–16 (1)	Jose Luis Munoz	TKO	Vale Tudo Mexico 2	August 28, 2000	1	1:42	Mexico	
Loss	13–15 (1)	Larry Parker	TKO	VTM 1: Copa Mexico 2000 Grand Prix	June 23, 2000	1	0:45	Nuevo Laredo, Mexico	
Win	13–14 (1)	Hector Ferreyro	Submission	VTM 1: Copa Mexico 2000 Grand Prix	June 23, 2000	1	0:36	Nuevo Laredo, Mexico	
Loss	12–14 (1)	Jake Shields	Submission (arm-triangle choke)	Best of the Best	May 4, 2000	1	N/A	Tempe, Arizona, United States	
Win	12–13 (1)	Luke Pedigo	Submission (armbar)	TFC 1: Fightzone 1	February 26, 2000	1	N/A	Fort Wayne, Indiana, United States	
Loss	11–13 (1)	Steve Berger	Submission (guillotine choke)	Submission Fighting Championship	January 28, 2000	1	1:30	Belleville, Illinois, United States	
Loss	11–12 (1)	Alexandre Ferreira	Submission (keylock)	Amsterdam Absolute Championship 2	November 27, 1999	1	0:48	Amsterdam, Holland	
Loss	11–11 (1)	Maurice Wilson	Submission (guillotine choke)	Cage Wars 2	October 21, 1999	1	N/A	Arizona, United States	
Loss	11–10 (1)	Antonio McKee	TKO (submission to punches)	Ready to Rumble	October 13, 1999	1	N/A	Woodland Hills, California, United States	
Loss	11–9 (1)	Paul Nixon	Submission (armbar)	HOOKnSHOOT: Texas Heat	October 2, 1999	1	4:17	Harker Heights, Texas, United States	
Loss	11–8 (1)	Bob Cook	TKO (submission to punches)	Warriors Challenge 5	September 18, 1999	1	N/A	Fresno, California, United States	
Loss	11–7 (1)	Yves Edwards	Submission (rear-naked choke)	Armageddon 1	August 23, 1999	1	N/A	Houston, Texas, United States	
Win	11–6 (1)	David Harris	Submission (armbar)	Absolute Face Off	August 8, 1999	1	0:13	Phoenix, Arizona, United States	
NC	10–6 (1)	Top Chynaimen	NC (illegal punches)	Extreme Shoot out	June 25, 1999	1	N/A	McAllen, Texas, United States	
Win	10–6	Henry Cho	Submission (rear-naked choke)	Neutral Grounds 12	May 28, 1999	1	N/A	N/A	No location given
Win	9–6	David Harris	Submission (rear-naked choke)	Arizona Shootfighting Association	May 22, 1999	1	1:01	Phoenix, Arizona, United States	
Win	8–6	James Minson	DQ	Extreme Shoot out	April 16, 1999	1	N/A	Mission, Texas, United States	
Win	7–6	David Finn	Submission (rear-naked choke)	Extreme Shoot out	April 16, 1999	1	2:18	Mission, Texas, United States	
Win	6–6	Vincent Ellis	KO (punches)	World Shoot Wrestling 3	March 15, 1999	1	N/A	Pasadena, Texas, United States	
Win	5–6	Gabriel Hernandez	Submission (heel hook)	World Shoot Wrestling 3	March 15, 1999	1	N/A	Pasadena, Texas, United States	
Loss	4–6	Kevin Cook	Submission (choke)	World Extreme Fighting 5	February 21, 1999	1	2:50	United States	
Loss	4–5	Ben Earwood	Submission (heel hook)	Super Brawl 11	February 21, 1999	1	1:54	Honolulu, Hawaii, United States	
Win	4–4	Brennan Kamaka	Submission (guillotine choke)	Super Brawl 11	February 21, 1999	1	0:59	Honolulu, Hawaii, United States	
Loss	3–4	Justin Martin	Submission (ankle lock)	Power Ring Warriors	November 7, 1998	1	1:40	Humble, Texas, United States	
Loss	3–3	Dennis Hallman	TKO (submission to punches)	Extreme Challenge 21	October 17, 1998	1	0:44	Hayward, Wisconsin, United States	
Loss	3–2	Tom Schmitz	Submission (armbar)	Extreme Challenge 21	October 17, 1998	1	0:25	Hayward, Wisconsin, United States	
Win	3–1	Michael Buell	Submission (rear-naked choke)	Super Brawl 9	September 19, 1998	1	2:23	El Paso, Texas, United States	
Loss	2–1	Victor Hunsaker	Submission (heel hook)	Super Brawl 8	August 4, 1998	1	0:36	Honolulu, Hawaii, United States	
Win	2–0	Tim Horton	KO (punches)	World Shoot Wrestling 2	July 14, 1998	2	1:23	Houston, Texas, United States	
Win	1–0	Ramone Monserrate	Submission (guillotine choke)	World Shoot Wrestling	June 12, 1998	1	9:08	Pasadena, Texas, United States	
