= Rodrigo Lima (fighter) =

Brazilian martial artist

- Born: May 9, 1991; Rio de Janeiro, Brazil
- Died: April 21, 2019 (aged 27); Belem, Brazil
- Other names: Ratinho
- Height: 5 ft 6 in (1.68 m)
- Weight: 135 lb (61 kg; 9.6 st)
- Division: Bantamweight (135 lb); Featherweight (145 lb)
- Reach: 66.0 in (168 cm)
- Fighting out of: Rio de Janeiro, Brazil
- Team: Team Nogueira; Pochet / VT Jiu-Jitsu
- Rank: Black belt in BJJ
- Years active: 2008–2019

Mixed martial arts record
- Total: 16
- Wins: 12
- By knockout: 3
- By submission: 6
- By decision: 3
- Losses: 4
- By submission: 2
- By decision: 2

Other information
- Mixed martial arts record from Sherdog

Rodrigo Lima (May 9, 1991 - April 21, 2019) was a Brazilian mixed martial artist who competed in Bellator's bantamweight division, as well as in smaller promotions.

== Mixed martial arts career ==
=== Early career: Watch Out Combat Show ===
Lima started his professional career in 2008. He fought mainly for Brazilian promotion Watch Out Combat Show. There he compiled a record of ten victories and no losses.

In 2011, Lima signed with Bellator to compete in the bantamweight tournament.

=== Bellator MMA ===
Lima made his debut on April 6, 2012 at Bellator 64 in the quarterfinal match of Bellator season six bantamweight tournament against Hiroshi Nakamura. Lima lost for the first time via unanimous decision (29-27, 29–27, 29-27).

Lima faced Ronnie Mann on March 28, 2013 at Bellator 94. Lima defeated Mann via unanimous decision (30-27, 30–27, 30-27) and earned a spot in Bellator 2013 summer series bantamweight tournament.

In the semifinal, Lima faced Rafael Silva on July 31, 2013 at Bellator 97. He lost via submission due to a rear-naked choke in the third round.

== Death ==
On April 21, 2019, Lima was killed after an altercation with an Uber driver, identified as Jefferson Roger Maciel in Belem, Brazil. Lima was riding with four people when Maciel became annoyed with one of the passenger's tone and asked for silence. Lima punched Maciel, after which all of the passengers left Maciel's vehicle and went toward a gas station. Maciel drove away momentarily before speeding up and striking Lima with his car, who was killed instantly. The news of Lima's death was confirmed by longtime friend and teammate Michel Prazeres.

== Mixed martial arts record ==
Professional record breakdown
17 matches	13 wins	4 losses
By knockout	3	0
By submission	6	2
By decision	4	2

Res.	Record	Opponent	Method	Event	Date	Round	Time	Location	Notes
Win	13–4	Rolando Velasco	Submission (guillotine choke)	Tachi Palace Fights 33	November 2, 2017	2	3:47	Lemoore, California, United States	
Loss	12–4	Shawn Bunch	Decision (unanimous)	Conquer FC 4	June 24, 2017	3	5:00	Richmond, California, United States	
Win	12–3	Matt Betzold	Decision (unanimous)	Legacy FC 40	March 20, 2015	3	5:00	Atlanta, Georgia, United States	
Loss	11–3	Keith Richardson	Submission (arm-triangle choke)	Fight Lab 43	January 24, 2015	3	N/A	North Carolina, United States	
Loss	11–2	Rafael Silva	Submission (rear-naked choke)	Bellator 97	July 31, 2013	3	2:03	Rio Rancho, New Mexico, United States	Bellator 2013 summer series bantamweight tournament semifinal.
Win	11–1	Ronnie Mann	Decision (unanimous)	Bellator 94	March 28, 2013	3	5:00	Tampa, Florida, United States	
Loss	10–1	Hiroshi Nakamura	Decision (unanimous)	Bellator 64	April 6, 2012	3	5:00	Windsor, Ontario, Canada	Bellator season 6 bantamweight tournament quarterfinal.
Win	10–0	Denison Silva	TKO (punches)	Watch Out Combat Show 15	December 17, 2011	1	2:39	Rio de Janeiro, Brazil	
Win	9–0	Jeferson Hall	Submission (guillotine choke)	Watch Out Combat Show 15	August 26, 2011	1	0:27	Rio de Janeiro, Brazil	
Win	8–0	Heliovanio da Silva	Submission (rear-naked choke)	Watch Out Combat Show 13	May 13, 2011	1	2:22	Brasília, Brazil	
Win	7–0	D'Angelo de Souza Vieira	Submission (bulldog choke)	Watch Out Combat Show 10	December 10, 2010	1	3:44	Rio de Janeiro, Brazil	
Win	6–0	Mauricio dos Santos Jr.	Decision (unanimous)	Brasil Fight 2: Minas Gerais vs. Rio de Janeiro	August 14, 2010	3	5:00	Belo Horizonte, Minas Gerais, Brazil	
Win	5–0	Bruno Emílio	KO (punch)	Watch Out Combat Show 8	June 19, 2010	1	N/A	Rio de Janeiro, Brazil	
Win	4–0	Luiz Carlos Gomes	TKO (retirement)	Watch Out Combat Show 7	April 8, 2010	1	N/A	Rio de Janeiro, Brazil	
Win	3–0	Leandro Feijão	Submission (armbar)	Watch Out Combat Show 6	December 12, 2009	1	0:24	Rio de Janeiro, Brazil	
Win	2–0	Eduardo Feliciano	Submission (arm-triangle choke)	Watch Out Combat Show 3	March 19, 2009	1	3:06	Rio de Janeiro, Brazil	
Win	1–0	Richard Medeiros	Decision (unanimous)	Watch Out Combat Show 1	May 10, 2008	2	5:00	Rio de Janeiro, Brazil	

=== Mixed martial arts amateur record ===
Res.	Record	Opponent	Method	Event	Date	Round	Time	Location	Notes
Win	4–0	Jamilson Silva	Decision (unanimous)	Watch Out Combat Show 4	June 25, 2009	3	5:00	Rio de Janeiro, Brazil	
Win	3–0	Bruno Antunes	Submission (rear-naked choke)	Rio FC 2	June 20, 2009	1	N/A	Rio de Janeiro, Brazil	
Win	2–0	Antonio Roberto	Decision (unanimous)	Rio FC 2	June 20, 2009	2	N/A	Rio de Janeiro, Brazil	
Win	1–0	Caio Conceição	Decision (unanimous)	Watch Out Combat Show 2	September 25, 2008	3	5:00	Rio de Janeiro, Brazil	
