= Chad Leonhardt =

American mixed martial arts fighter

- Born: Chad Alan Leonhardt; February 19, 1980 (age 46); United States
- Other names: The Boss
- Height: 6 ft 0 in (1.83 m)
- Weight: 171 lb (78 kg; 12.2 st)
- Division: Welterweight (170 lb)
- Fighting out of: Sterling, Oklahoma, United States
- Team: Gladiators Academy
- Years active: 2008–present

Mixed martial arts record
- Total: 13
- Wins: 9
- By knockout: 7
- By submission: 0
- By decision: 2
- Losses: 4
- By knockout: 1
- By submission: 3
- By decision: 0
- Draws: 0
- No contests: 0

Other information
- Mixed martial arts record from Sherdog

Chad Leonhardt (born February 19, 1980) is an American mixed martial artist who fought for Strikeforce and Bellator Fighting Championships.

== MMA career ==
=== Bellator Fighting Championships ===
Leonhardt made his debut on May 9, 2009 at Bellator 9 against Dan Keenan. He won via KO in the first round.

Leonhardt faced Kelly Leo on March 12, 2011 at Bellator 36. He won by corner stoppage at the end of the second round.

=== Strikeforce ===
Leonhardt made his debut on August 12, 2011 at Strikeforce Challengers: Gurgel vs. Duarte against Mike Bronzoulis. He lost via TKO in the third round.

== Mixed martial arts record ==
Professional record breakdown
13 matches	9 wins	4 losses
By knockout	7	1
By submission	0	3
By decision	2	0

Res.	Record	Opponent	Method	Event	Date	Round	Time	Location	Notes
Loss	9–4	Matt Foster	Submission	Horsepower Promotions - Fists of Fury 2	June 1, 2013	1	1:52	Lawton, Oklahoma, United States	
Loss	9–3	Mike Bronzoulis	TKO (leg kick and punches)	Strikeforce Challengers: Gurgel vs. Duarte	August 12, 2011	3	1:30	Las Vegas, Nevada, United States	
Win	9–2	Kelly Leo	TKO (corner stoppage)	Bellator 36	March 12, 2011	2	5:00	Shreveport, Louisiana, United States	
Win	8–2	Bill Albrecht	TKO (punches)	RAD - Rumble at Diamondjacks	November 13, 2010	1	0:11	Shreveport, Louisiana, United States	
Win	7–2	Stephen Adkisson	KO (punch)	Superbrawl 6 - Rampage at The Riverfront	April 10, 2010	1	0:45	Alexandria, Louisiana, United States	
Loss	6–2	Joey Gorczynski	Submission (guillotine choke)	FCF - Freestyle Cage Fighting 38	January 16, 2010	1	2:27	Tulsa, Oklahoma, United States	
Win	6–1	Corey Holder	TKO (punches)	CK - Breaking Point	October 9, 2009	1	1:43	Bossier City, Louisiana, United States	
Win	5–1	Victor Rackliff	Decision (unanimous)	Cage Kings - Victory at the Riverdome	July 17, 2009	3	5:00	Shreveport, Louisiana, United States	
Win	4–1	Dan Keenan	KO (knee)	Bellator 9	May 29, 2009	1	3:03	Monroe, Louisiana, United States	
Win	3–1	Chris Cichy	TKO (punches)	RR - Ring Rulers	May 9, 2009	1	1:18	Lawton, Oklahoma, United States	
Win	2–1	Cale Grady	TKO (punches)	Cage Kings - Total Domination	March 20, 2009	2	2:20	Bossier City, Louisiana, United States	
Win	1–1	Jewel Scott	Decision (unanimous)	Ring Rulers - Super Brawl	January 10, 2009	3	5:00	Alexandria, Louisiana, United States	
Loss	0–1	Tony Hunter	Submission (rear-naked choke)	CK - Destruction at the Dome	October 10, 2008	1	0:56	Bossier City, Louisiana, United States	
