= Mike Bronzoulis =

American mixed martial arts fighter

- Born: 5 January 1979 (age 47); Houston, Texas, U.S.
- Other names: The Greek
- Height: 6 ft 0 in (1.83 m)
- Weight: 155.4 lb (70.5 kg; 11.10 st)
- Division: Middleweight; Welterweight; Lightweight
- Stance: Orthodox
- Team: Revolution Dojo; Paradigm; Main Street Boxing Gym
- Years active: 2007–2018

Mixed martial arts record
- Total: 29
- Wins: 18
- By knockout: 11
- By submission: 3
- By decision: 3
- By disqualification: 1
- Losses: 10
- By knockout: 2
- By submission: 3
- By decision: 5
- Draws: 1

Other information
- Website: http://www.thegreek.pro/
- Mixed martial arts record from Sherdog

Mike Bronzoulis (born January 5, 1979) is an American mixed martial artist who most recently competed in the Lightweight division of Bellator. A professional competitor since 2007, Bronzoulis has competed for Strikeforce, Legacy FC, Titan FC, Shark Fights, and was a finalist on Spike TV's Bellator: Fight Master reality show.

== Background ==
Bronzoulis began practicing martial arts when he was around seven years old, when his father, a martial artist himself, brought the young Bronzoulis to a karate school. From the beginning, Bronzoulis had found his passion, eventually learning Tae Kwon Do, Tang Shu Do, Shotokan, Shotoru, American Freestyle, and kickboxing. When he turned 16, Bronzoulis spent most of his time at the Fairtex Thai kickboxing camp and also watched Jean-Claude Van Damme movies.

== Mixed martial arts career ==
Bronzoulis made his professional debut in 2007. On April 25, 2009, he fought UFC veteran Kamal Shalorus to a majority draw.

=== Shark Fights ===
Bronzoulis made his Shark Fights debut in 2010 at Shark Fights 12 where he defeated Anselmo Martinez via disqualification. His next fight under the organization was at Shark Fights 14: Horwich vs. Villefort against Lucas Lopes where he won via unanimous decision.

=== Legacy Fighting Championship ===
On March 20, 2010, Bronzoulis was defeated by Levi Forrest via unanimous decision at Legacy FC 2 for the Legacy Welterweight Title.

On November 5, 2010, Bronzoulis defeated Jonathan Harris at Legacy FC 4 via TKO due to punches in round one to win the Legacy FC Welterweight Championship.

On January 29, 2011, Bronzoulis defeated Joe Christoper at Legacy FC 5 via TKO due to punches in round three to retain the Legacy FC Welterweight Championship, he later vacated the title when he signed with Strikeforce.

On December 16, 2011, Bronzoulis returned to Legacy FC against Jorge Patino at Legacy FC 9 losing via unanimous decision.

On May 11, 2012, Bronzoulis lost to UFC vet Gerald Harris at Legacy FC 11 via split decision.

On November 16, 2012, Bronzoulis defeated Robert Shawn Machado at Legacy FC 15 via unanimous decision.

=== Strikeforce ===
On May 25, 2011, it was announced that Bronzoulis had signed a four-fight deal with Strikeforce.

Bronzoulis made his debut for the promotion on June 18, 2011, against WEC veteran Todd Moore at Strikeforce: Overeem vs. Werdum. He lost the fight via unanimous decision (29-28, 29–28, 29–28).

Bronzoulis rebounded from this loss just two months later when he defeated Chad Leonhardt via TKO in the third round on the undercard of Strikeforce Challengers: Gurgel vs. Duarte.

=== Bellator MMA ===
On May 6, 2013, it was announced that Bronzoulis would be featured as a participant on Bellator MMA's reality TV show Fight Master: Bellator MMA.

In his preliminary fight to get on the show, Bronzoulis defeated Gareth Joseph by unanimous decision. During the team selection, he chose Randy Couture to be his coach. In his second fight, Bronzoulis defeated Jason Norwood by knockout in the third round. In the quarter-finals, Bronzoulis faced friend Chris Lozano and won via unanimous decision. In the semifinals, he fought Eric Bradley and, despite being controlled for most of two rounds, mounted a comeback and won via TKO in the second round. He was set to face Joe Riggs in the tournament final scheduled to take place at Bellator 98, but the bout was canceled after Riggs suffered an eye injury. The bout eventually took place on November 2, 2013, at Bellator 106 and Bronzoulis lost via unanimous decision.

=== Post-Bellator ===
Bronzoulis faced Brandon Farran at Triple A MMA 4: Caged Hostility on January 16, 2014. Bronzoulis lost the fight via TKO (punches) in the first round, marking the first KO/TKO loss of his career.

Bronzoulis faced Keith Johnson at Titan FC 29 on August 22, 2014. He lost via rear naked choke submission in the third round.

=== Return to Legacy FC ===
Bronzoulis returned to the promotion as he faced Justin Reiswerg at Legacy FC 37 on November 14, 2014. He won the fight by submission in the second round, ending his three-fight losing streak over the past year.

In his next fight for the promotion, Bronzoulis faced Jonathan Harris at Legacy FC 39 on February 27, 2015. He won the fight via TKO in the first round.

== Championships and accomplishments ==
- Bellator MMA
  - Fight Master: Bellator MMA Season 1 Runner Up
- Legacy Fighting Championship
  - Legacy FC Welterweight Championship (One time)
  - One successful title defense
  - Legacy FC Lightweight Championship (One time)

== Mixed martial arts record ==
Professional record breakdown
29 matches	18 wins	10 losses
By knockout	11	2
By submission	3	3
By decision	3	5
By disqualification	1	0
Draws	1	

Res.	Record	Opponent	Method	Event	Date	Round	Time	Location	Notes
Loss	18–10–1	Zane Kamaka	TKO (arm injury)	X-1 49 - Lightweight Grand Prix	April 7, 2018	1	5:00	Honolulu, Hawaii, United States	
Loss	18–9–1	Josh Thomson	Submission (arm-triangle choke)	Bellator 142: Dynamite 1	September 19, 2015	3	0:39	San Jose, California, United States	
Win	18–8–1	Dave Burrow	Decision (unanimous)	Legacy FC vs. RFA Superfight Card	May 8, 2015	5	5:00	Robinsonville, Mississippi, United States	Won the Vacant Legacy FC Lightweight Championship.
Win	17–8–1	Jonathan Harris	TKO (punches)	Legacy FC 39	February 27, 2015	1	1:43	Houston, Texas, United States	
Win	16–8–1	Justin Reiswerg	Submission (rear-naked choke)	Legacy FC 37	November 14, 2014	2	4:51	Houston, Texas, United States	Lightweight bout.
Loss	15–8–1	Keith Johnson	Submission (rear-naked choke)	Titan FC 29: Ricci vs. Sotiropoulos	August 22, 2014	3	3:31	Fayetteville, North Carolina, United States	
Loss	15–7–1	Brandon Farran	TKO (punches)	Triple A MMA 4: Caged Hostility	January 16, 2014	1	0:43	Fort Worth, Texas, United States	Middleweight bout.
Loss	15–6–1	Joe Riggs	Decision (unanimous)	Bellator 106	November 2, 2013	3	5:00	Long Beach, California, United States	Fight Master Tournament Final.
Win	15–5–1	Robert Shawn Machado	Decision (unanimous)	Legacy FC 15	November 16, 2012	3	5:00	Houston, Texas, United States	
Win	14–5–1	Danny Salinas	KO (head kick)	UWF: Tournament of Warriors Round 2	May 26, 2012	2	1:47	Laredo, Texas, United States	Catchweight (175 lbs) bout.
Loss	13–5–1	Gerald Harris	Decision (split)	Legacy FC 11	May 11, 2012	3	5:00	Houston, Texas, United States	
Loss	13–4–1	Jorge Patino	Decision (unanimous)	Legacy FC 9	December 16, 2011	5	5:00	Houston, Texas, United States	For the Legacy FC Welterweight Championship.
Win	13–3–1	Chad Leonhardt	TKO (leg kick and punches)	Strikeforce Challengers: Gurgel vs. Duarte	August 12, 2011	3	1:30	Las Vegas, Nevada, United States	
Loss	12–3–1	Todd Moore	Decision (unanimous)	Strikeforce: Overeem vs. Werdum	June 18, 2011	3	5:00	Dallas, Texas, United States	
Win	12–2–1	Lucas Lopes	Decision (unanimous)	Shark Fights 14: Horwich vs. Villefort	March 11, 2011	3	5:00	Lubbock, Texas, United States	Catchweight (175 lbs) bout.
Win	11–2–1	Joe Christopher	TKO (punches)	Legacy FC 5	January 29, 2011	3	3:33	Houston, Texas, United States	Defended the Legacy FC Welterweight Championship.
Win	10–2–1	Jonathan Harris	TKO (punches)	Legacy FC 4	November 5, 2010	1	3:43	Houston, Texas, United States	Won the Legacy FC Welterweight Championship.
Win	9–2–1	Anselmo Martinez	DQ (unintentional knee to downed opponent)	Shark Fights 12: Unfinished Business	June 26, 2010	2	3:54	Amarillo, Texas, United States	
Loss	8–2–1	Levi Forrest	Decision (unanimous)	Legacy FC 2	March 20, 2010	3	5:00	Houston, Texas, United States	
Win	8–1–1	Cleburn Walker	TKO (punches)	Steele Cage 2	November 7, 2009	1	4:39	Frisco, Texas, United States	
Draw	7–1–1	Kamal Shalorus	Draw (majority)	KOK 6: Fists of Fury	April 25, 2009	3	5:00	Austin, Texas, United States	
Win	7–1	Joshua Lee	TKO (punches)	Urban Rumble Championships 3	January 24, 2009	2	0:59	Pasadena, California, United States	
Win	6–1	Keith Schneider	TKO (punches)	Renaissance MMA 10	January 9, 2009	2	4:42	New Orleans, Louisiana, United States	
Win	5–1	Mark Ortiz	KO (punches)	Katana Cagefighting: Conquest	December 6, 2008	3	1:56	Robstown, Texas, United States	
Win	4–1	George Sweeney	Submission	STFL 3: War Zone	August 2, 2008	1	1:22	McAllen, Texas, United States	
Win	3–1	Edwynn Jones	Submission (rear-naked choke)	Xp3: The Proving Ground	July 26, 2008	1	1:23	Houston, Texas, United States	
Win	2–1	Paul Hansen	TKO (punches)	SCP: South Coast Promotions	July 18, 2008	1	0:57	Houston, Texas, United States	
Win	1–1	Robert Larson	TKO	STFL 2: Aftershock	May 3, 2008	1	2:41	Edinburg, Texas, United States	
Loss	0–1	Matt Rangel	Submission (armbar)	Renegades Extreme Fighting	October 20, 2007	1	1:18	Houston, Texas, United States	

=== Mixed martial arts exhibition record ===
Exhibition record breakdown		
4 matches	4 wins	0 losses
By knockout	2	0
By submission	0	0
By decision	2	0

Res.	Record	Opponent	Method	Event	Date	Round	Time	Location	Notes
Win	4–0	Eric Bradley	TKO (punches)	Fight Master: Bellator MMA	August 29, 2013	2	N/A	New Orleans, Louisiana, United States	Semifinal bout.
Win	3–0	Chris Lozano	Decision (unanimous)	Fight Master: Bellator MMA	August 15, 2013	2	5:00	New Orleans, Louisiana, United States	Quarterfinal bout.
Win	2–0	Jason Norwood	KO (punch)	Fight Master: Bellator MMA	July 24, 2013	3	N/A	New Orleans, Louisiana, United States	Preliminary bout.
Win	1–0	Gareth Joseph	Decision (unanimous)	Fight Master: Bellator MMA	July 10, 2013	2	5:00	New Orleans, Louisiana, United States	Elimination bout.

== See also ==
- List of Bellator MMA alumni
- List of male mixed martial artists
