= Shark Fights =

MMA promoter based in Texas

Shark Fight Promotions, LLC
- Industry: Mixed Martial Arts Promotion
- Founded: August 2008
- Founder: N/A
- Headquarters: Amarillo, Texas, United States
- Key people: Wes Nolen
- Parent: Shark Fight Promotions, LLC

Shark Fights was a mixed martial arts promotion based in Amarillo, Texas. It made its debut on October 24, 2008. On September 11, 2010, Shark Fights had its biggest card in Shark Fights history by having past and present UFC fighters Jorge Masvidal, Keith Jardine, Rameau Thierry Sokoudjou, Paul Daley, and Houston Alexander all on the same card. It last hosted an event on November 11, 2011.

== Events ==
#	Event title	Date	Arena	Location	Notes
21	Shark Fights 21: Lashley vs. Knothe	November 11, 2011	Fair Park Coliseum	Lubbock, Texas	
20	Shark Fights 20	October 15, 2011	Edgewater Casino Resort	Laughlin, Nevada	
19	Shark Fights 19	September 10, 2011	Independence Events Center	Independence, Missouri	
18	Shark Fights 18	August 19, 2011	John Ascuaga's Nugget Casino Resort	Sparks, Nevada	
17	Shark Fights 17: Horwich vs. Rosholt 2	July 15, 2011	Dr Pepper Arena	Frisco, Texas	
16	Shark Fights 16: Neer vs. Juarez	June 25, 2011	Ector County Coliseum	Odessa, Texas	
15	Shark Fights 15: Villaseñor vs Camozzi	May 27, 2011	Santa Ana Star Center	Rio Rancho, New Mexico	First event outside of Texas, First Event for Fuel TV
14	Shark Fights 14: Horwich vs. Villefort	March 11, 2011	Fair Park Coliseum	Lubbock, Texas	First Live Event on HDNet
13	Shark Fights 13: Jardine vs Prangley	September 11, 2010	Amarillo Civic Center	Amarillo, Texas	First Live Pay-Per-View
12	Shark Fights 12: Unfinished Business	June 26, 2010	Gamboa's Outdoor Event Center	Amarillo, Texas	This event had 10,918 people in attendance.
11	Shark Fights 11: Humes vs Buentello	May 22, 2010	Ector County Coliseum	Odessa, Texas	
10	Shark Fights 10: Unfinished Business	April 24, 2010	Fair Park Coliseum	Lubbock, Texas	
9	Shark Fights 9: Phillips vs Evans	March 20, 2010	Amarillo Civic Center	Amarillo, Texas	
8	Shark Fights 8: Super Brawl	February 5, 2010	Fair Park Coliseum	Lubbock, Texas	
7	Shark Fights 7: Sursa vs Prangley	November 28, 2009	Azteca Music Hall	Amarillo, Texas	
6	Shark Fights 6: Stars & Stripes	September 12, 2009	Amarillo Civic Center	Amarillo, Texas	
5	Shark Fights 5.5: Nothing To Lose	July 18, 2009	Gamboa's Outdoor Event Center	Amarillo, Texas	10,603 people in attendance.
-	Shark Fights 5: Outdoor Bash & Brawl	June 27, 2009	Gamboa's Outdoor Event Center	Amarillo, Texas	Canceled due to bad weather.
4	Shark Fights 4: Richards vs Schoonover	May 2, 2009	Citibank Coliseum	Lubbock, Texas	
3	Shark Fights 3	March 14, 2009	Azteca Music Hall	Amarillo, Texas	
2	Shark Fights 2	December 13, 2008	Azteca Music Hall	Amarillo, Texas	
1	Shark Fights 1	October 24, 2008	Amarillo National Center	Amarillo, Texas	

== Final champions ==
Division	Upper weight limit	Champion	Since	Nationality	Title Defenses
Heavyweight	265 lb (120 kg; 18.9 st)	Bobby Lashley	November 11, 2011 (Shark Fights 21)	United States	
Light Heavyweight	205 lb (93 kg; 14.6 st)	Trevor Prangley	November 28, 2009 (Shark Fights 7)	South Africa	0
Middleweight	185 lb (84 kg; 13.2 st)	Gerald Harris	September 12, 2009 (Shark Fights 6)	United States	0
Welterweight	170 lb (77 kg; 12 st)	Vacant			
Lightweight	155 lb (70 kg; 11.1 st)	Vacant			
Featherweight	140 lb (64 kg; 10 st)	Ronnie Mann	September 11, 2010 (Shark Fights 13)	England	0
