= South Plains Fairgrounds =

Fairground in Texas, United States

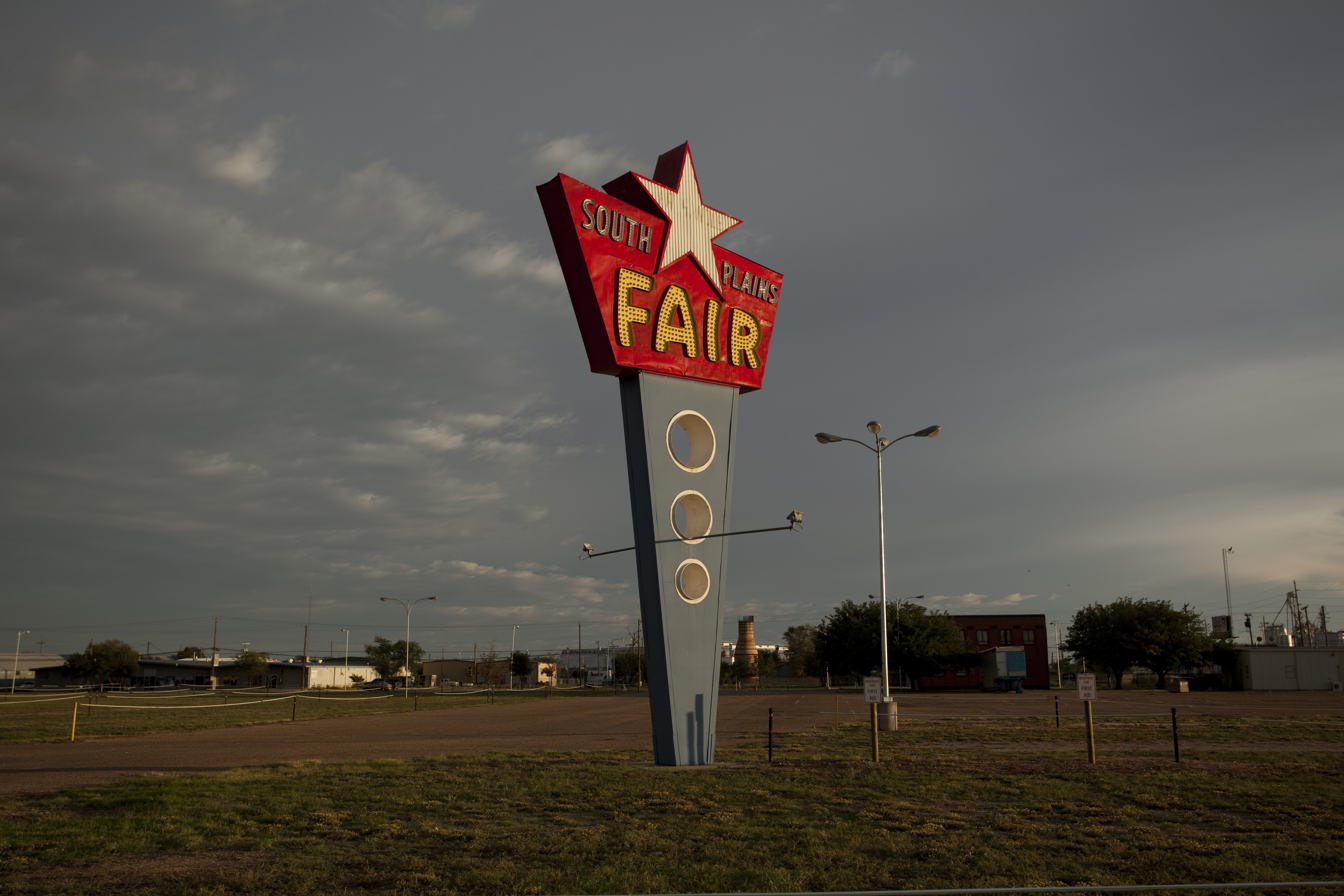
- Home of the Panhandle South Plains Fair

- Location within Texas Location within the United States
- Location: Lubbock, Texas
- Coordinates: 33°35′10″N 101°50′06″W
- Area: 65 acres (26 ha)
- Established: 1914
- Owner: Lubbock County
- Status: Open in September
- Website: Panhandle South Plains Fair

The South Plains Fairgrounds, located on the east side of Lubbock, Texas, is the home of the Panhandle-South Plains Fair, which occurs in late September each year. The fairgrounds consist of around 65 acres (26 ha) situated along the western edge of upper Yellow House Canyon.

== History ==
The first Fair was held in the fall of 1914. The Fair has continued every year since 1914, except during the World War II years of 1942-1945. Today, the Panhandle-South Plains Fair is known as "The Granddaddy of West Texas Fairs," and ranks second to Dallas's State Fair of Texas in attendance and continuous history.

The South Plains Fairgrounds was the first home field for the Texas Tech Red Raiders football team. The Red Raiders (then known as the Matadors) played their home games at the fairgrounds during the 1925 season and the first game of the 1926 season against the Schreiner Institute.

At the time, the campus of Texas Technological College was still an open range without a sizable area clear of grass burrs and goat heads, so head coach Ewing Y. Freeland held the first Matadors game on the open grass fields of the fairgrounds. The Matadors did not lose a game at the Lubbock Fair Grounds, winning 5 games and tying 3. By the 1926 season, a practice field which had been cleared became the location of Tech Field. The South Plains Fairgrounds remains the only home field of the Red Raiders not located on the Texas Tech campus.

== See also ==
- American Wind Power Center
- Lubbock Lake Landmark
- Museum of Texas Tech University
- National Ranching Heritage Center
- North Fork Double Mountain Fork Brazos River
- Silent Wings Museum
