= Amarillo National Center =

Coordinates: 35°12′14″N 101°47′50″W

The Amarillo National Center is a 10,000-seat multi-purpose arena in Amarillo, Texas. It was built in 2000. Along with the Amarillo Civic Center, it hosts local concerts and sporting events for the Amarillo area.

The arena contains 5,000 permanent seats and its 45,000-square-foot (4,200 m^{2}) arena floor can hold an additional 5,000 floor seats.

The center is named for locally owned Amarillo National Bank.
