= Brimage =

Brimage is a surname. Notable people with the surname include:

- Marcus Brimage (born 1985), American mixed martial artist
- Thomas Brimage (1866–1915), Australian businessman and politician
- Thomas Abel Brimage Spratt (1811–1888), English vice-admiral, hydrographer and geologist
- William Brimage Bate (1826–1905), American Confederate veteran and politician
