= Diego Brandão =

Brazilian mixed martial artist

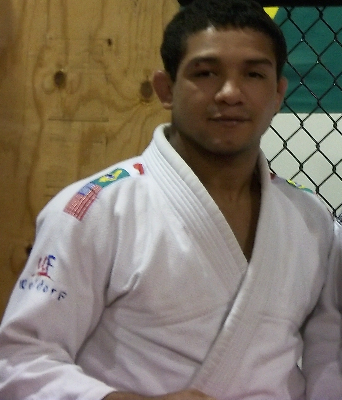
- Born: 27 May 1987 (age 39); Fortaleza, Brazil
- Other names: Ceara
- Height: 5 ft 7 in (1.70 m)
- Weight: 145 lb (66 kg; 10.4 st)
- Division: Featherweight; Lightweight
- Reach: 69 in (175 cm)
- Fighting out of: San Antonio, Texas, U.S.
- Team: Jackson's Mixed Martial Arts
- Rank: Second degree black belt in Brazilian Jiu-Jitsu
- Years active: 2005–present

Mixed martial arts record
- Total: 52
- Wins: 31
- By knockout: 18
- By submission: 6
- By decision: 7
- Losses: 21
- By knockout: 11
- By submission: 2
- By decision: 7
- By disqualification: 1

Other information
- Mixed martial arts record from Sherdog

Diego Brandão (born 27 May 1987) is a Brazilian mixed martial artist currently competing in the Lightweight division. A professional since 2005, he formerly competed for the UFC, RIZIN, and Fight Nights Global. He was the winner of Spike TV's The Ultimate Fighter: Team Bisping vs. Team Miller.

== Mixed martial arts career ==
=== Early career ===
Brandão made his MMA debut against Michel Bastos, winning via submission. He went 3–1 before fighting against UFC veteran Ronys Torres. He lost the fight by TKO due to punches. He then fought longtime UFC veteran Brian Foster and won via KO in the first round. Following the contest he won 6 and lost four of his next ten fights, with 3 wins by KO, 2 by submission and 1 by decision, before signing with the UFC.

Brandão later became a member of Jackson's MMA in Albuquerque, New Mexico.

=== The Ultimate Fighter ===
In 2011, Brandão signed with the UFC to compete on The Ultimate Fighter: Team Bisping vs. Team Miller. In the first episode, Brandão fought Jesse Newell to gain entry into the Ultimate Fighter house. Brandão quickly defeated Newell via first round knockout. He was the number one featherweight pick for Team Bisping.

Brandão proved to be a loose cannon with confrontations with Marcus Brimage and Steven Siler. In the fifth episode it was announced that he would fight Siler on episode six. In this fight Diego charged out of the gate with a flying knee and knocked Siler unconscious 30 seconds into the first round with a left hook. With this win he advanced to the semi-finals to fight former WEC fighter, Bryan Caraway. Brandão defeated Caraway via KO due to a flying knee and follow up punches late in the first round. With the win over Caraway, Brandão moved on to the finale against Dennis Bermudez.

=== Ultimate Fighting Championship ===
Brandão officially made his UFC debut on 3 December 2011, at The Ultimate Fighter 14 Finale against Dennis Bermudez to determine the first ever featherweight winner of The Ultimate Fighter 14. After a back-and-forth first round Brandão was knocked down and hit with heavy shots on the ground until he caught Bermudez with an armbar, and quickly forced the tapout. With his performance, Brandão was awarded Fight of the Night andSubmission of the Night honors, giving him a total of $80,000 in bonuses. During the post-fight interview Diego proclaimed of his mother; "The only thing on my mind [is to] buy her [a] house".

Brandão fought Darren Elkins on 26 May 2012, at UFC 146. Brandão lost the fight via unanimous decision.

Brandão fought and defeated Joey Gambino on 13 October 2012, at UFC 153 via unanimous decision.

Brandão faced Pablo Garza on 6 April 2013, at UFC on Fuel TV 9. Brandão defeated Garza on UFC on FUEL TV 9 via first round submission with an arm triangle choke.

Brandão faced Daniel Pineda on 17 August 2013, at UFC Fight Night 26. He won the back-and-forth fight via unanimous decision.

Brandão faced Dustin Poirier on 28 December 2013, at UFC 168. There was some bad blood between the two that was evident during the staredown at the weigh-in, with Poirier claiming Brandão had threatened to "stab me in the neck." Brandão weighed in at 153 pounds, seven pounds over the accepted 146-pound limit for a featherweight non-title fight. Brandão would continue to cut weight and weighed in an hour later, but could only get down to 151.5 pounds. He was fined 25 percent of his purse, but the bout went on as scheduled. He lost the fight via TKO in the first round.

Brandão was expected to face Will Chope on 23 March 2014, at UFC Fight Night 38. However, Chope was released from UFC when documents were released that showed Chope was discharged from the U.S. Air Force for domestic violence towards his ex-wife.

Brandão was expected to face promotional newcomer Brian Ortega on 31 May 2014, at The Ultimate Fighter Brazil 3 Finale. However, Brandão pulled out of the bout in the days leading up to the event citing an injury. Due to the late nature of the change, officials did not try to find a replacement and Ortega was pulled from the card as well.

Brandão faced Conor McGregor on 19 July 2014, at UFC Fight Night 46, replacing an injured Cole Miller. Brandão lost the fight via TKO in the first round.

Brandão was expected to face Jimy Hettes on 31 January 2015, at UFC 183. However, the fight was canceled right before the event started, as Hettes passed out backstage. He was taken to a local hospital for precautionary reasons. Subsequently, the bout with Hettes was rescheduled for 18 April 2015, at UFC on Fox 15. Brandão won the fight due to a doctor stoppage between the first and second round.

Brandão faced Katsunori Kikuno on 27 September 2015, at UFC Fight Night 75. He dropped his opponent in the bout's opening seconds and followed up with a flurry of punches earning a TKO stoppage. The win also earned him his first Performance of the Night bonus award.

Brandão faced Brian Ortega on 2 January 2016, at UFC 195. After controlling the first two rounds with his striking, Brandão lost the fight via submission in the third round.

On 15 January 2016, it was announced that Brandao had tested positive for marijuana stemming from an in-competition test on 2 January. On 28 April 2016, Brandao was released from the UFC on account of a felony arrest. In ten fights under the promotion, he held a record of 6-4.

=== Fight Nights Global ===
On 20 October 2016, Brandão signed a contract to fight Russian mixed martial artist Rasul Mirzaev. However, on 3 December, Mirzaev pulled out of the bout for unknown reason. Brandão defeated Murad Machaev on 28 January 2017, at Fight Nights 58.

=== Absolute Championship Akhmat ===
Diego faced Salman Zhamaldaev on 26 March 2021 at ACA 120: Oliveira vs. Bibulatov. After tripping Salman in the second round, Diego delivered an illegal soccer kick to the head of Salman while his knee was on the ground. Salman couldn't continue, hence it was announced as an DQ loss for Diego.

Diego rematched Salman Zhamaldaev at ACA 127: Kerefov vs. Albaskhanov on 28 August 2021. Brandão lost the bout via majority decision.

Diego faced Alexey Polpudnikov at ACA 134: Bagov vs. Koshkin on 17 December 2021. Brandão lost the bout via TKO in the third round.

Diego faced Bibert Tumenov on 26 February 2022 at ACA 136: Bukuev vs Akopyan. He lost the bout via body shot KO in the second round.

=== Post ACA career ===
Following leaving ACA, Diego faced Oleg Lichkovakha at Ural FC 1 on 1 July 2022. He won the bout via TKO in the second round with knees and punches, breaking a six-fight losing streak and winning for the first time since 2019.

He next faced Matt Wagy at AFL: Invincible 2023 on 20 January 2023. He won the bout via KO in the first round with a flying knee.

Diego faced Derek Campos at Peak Fighting 29 on 10 June 2023. He won the bout via unanimous decision.

Diego faced Karshyga Dautbek on 9 September 2023 at Alash Pride 89, losing the bout in 36 seconds via TKO stoppage.

== Professional grappling career ==
Brandão stepped in on short notice to replace Kevin Lee against Chad Mendes in a grappling match at ADXC 5 on 3 August 2024. Brandão lost the match by decision.

== Championships and accomplishments ==
- Ultimate Fighting Championship
  - The Ultimate Fighter 14 Featherweight Tournament Winner
  - Fight of the Night (One time)
  - Submission of the Night (One time)
  - Performance of the Night (One time)
  - First ever Brazilian to win The Ultimate Fighter
  - UFC.com Awards
    - 2011: Ranked #5 Newcomer of the Year (Tied with John Dodson) & Ranked #6 Submission of the Year vs. Dennis Bermudez
- Sherdog
  - 'Submission of the Year' 2017 - Top 5 List #5 vs. Murad Machaev

== Mixed martial arts record ==
Professional record breakdown
52 matches	31 wins	21 losses
By knockout	18	11
By submission	6	2
By decision	7	7
By disqualification	0	1

Res.	Record	Opponent	Method	Event	Date	Round	Time	Location	Notes
Win	31–21	Kai Kamaka III	Decision (split)	Tuff-N-Uff 149	October 25, 2025	5	5:00	Las Vegas, Nevada, United States	Defended the Tuff-N-Uff Featherweight Championship.
Win	30–21	Canaan Kawaihae	TKO (punches)	Tuff-N-Uff 145	June 29, 2025	4	3:34	Las Vegas, Nevada, United States	Defended the Tuff-N-Uff Featherweight Championship.
Win	29–21	Jamie Siraj	KO (spinning wheel kick and punches)	Tuff-N-Uff 142	March 14, 2025	1	3:28	Las Vegas, Nevada, United States	Won the Tuff-N-Uff Featherweight Championship.
Loss	28–21	Karshyga Dautbek	TKO (punches)	Alash Pride 89	9 September 2023	1	0:36	Astana, Kazakhstan	Return to Lightweight.
Win	28–20	Derek Campos	Decision (unanimous)	Peak Fighting 29	10 June 2023	3	5:00	Amarillo, Texas, United States	Catchweight (160 lb) bout.
Win	27–20	Matt Wagy	KO (flying knee)	Action Fight League: Invincible 2023	20 January 2023	1	3:12	Hollywood, Florida, United States	Won the AFL Featherweight Championship.
Win	26–20	Oleg Lichkovakha	TKO (knee and punches)	Ural FC 1	1 July 2022	2	3:37	Perm, Russia	
Loss	25–20	Bibert Tumenov	KO (punch to the body)	ACA 136	26 February 2022	2	4:56	Moscow, Russia	
Loss	25–19	Alexey Polpudnikov	TKO (punches)	ACA 134	17 December 2021	3	0:54	Krasnodar, Russia	
Loss	25–18	Salman Zhamaldaev	Decision (majority)	ACA 127	28 August 2021	3	5:00	Krasnodar, Russia	
Loss	25–17	Salman Zhamaldaev	DQ (illegal kick)	ACA 120	26 March 2021	2	1:05	Saint Petersburg, Russia	
Loss	25–16	Dzhihad Yunusov	Decision (unanimous)	ACA 112	4 October 2020	3	5:00	Grozny, Russia	
Loss	25–15	Marat Balaev	Decision (split)	ACA 103	14 December 2019	3	5:00	Saint Petersburg, Russia	
Win	25–14	Dzhihad Yunusov	Decision (split)	ACA 100	4 October 2019	3	5:00	Grozny, Russia	Return to Featherweight.
Loss	24–14	Marcin Held	Decision (unanimous)	ACA 96	8 June 2019	3	5:00	Łódź, Poland	
Win	24–13	Vener Galiev	TKO (doctor stoppage)	RCC 5	15 December 2018	1	0:50	Yekaterinburg, Russia	
Loss	23–13	Daron Cruickshank	KO (flying knee)	Rizin 13	30 September 2018	2	0:17	Saitama, Japan	
Win	23–12	Satoru Kitaoka	KO (punches)	Rizin 11	29 July 2018	1	1:38	Saitama, Japan	
Loss	22–12	Akhmed Aliev	TKO (retirement)	Fight Nights Global 73	4 September 2017	2	3:34	Kaspiysk, Russia	
Win	22–11	Vener Galiev	KO (punches)	Fight Nights Global 67	25 May 2017	1	0:39	Yekaterinburg, Russia	
Win	21–11	Murad Machaev	Submission (armbar)	Fight Nights Global 58	28 January 2017	2	0:58	Kaspiysk, Russia	Lightweight debut.
Loss	20–11	Brian Ortega	Submission (triangle choke)	UFC 195	2 January 2016	3	3:58	Las Vegas, Nevada, United States	
Win	20–10	Katsunori Kikuno	TKO (punches)	UFC Fight Night: Barnett vs. Nelson	27 September 2015	1	0:28	Saitama, Japan	Performance of the Night.
Win	19–10	Jimy Hettes	TKO (doctor stoppage)	UFC on Fox: Machida vs. Rockhold	18 April 2015	1	5:00	Newark, New Jersey, United States	
Loss	18–10	Conor McGregor	TKO (punches)	UFC Fight Night: McGregor vs. Brandao	19 July 2014	1	4:05	Dublin, Ireland	
Loss	18–9	Dustin Poirier	KO (punches)	UFC 168	28 December 2013	1	4:54	Las Vegas, Nevada, United States	Catchweight (152 lb) bout; Brandão missed weight.
Win	18–8	Daniel Pineda	Decision (unanimous)	UFC Fight Night: Shogun vs. Sonnen	17 August 2013	3	5:00	Boston, Massachusetts, United States	
Win	17–8	Pablo Garza	Submission (arm-triangle choke)	UFC on Fuel TV: Mousasi vs. Latifi	6 April 2013	1	3:27	Stockholm, Sweden	
Win	16–8	Joey Gambino	Decision (unanimous)	UFC 153	13 October 2012	3	5:00	Rio de Janeiro, Brazil	
Loss	15–8	Darren Elkins	Decision (unanimous)	UFC 146	26 May 2012	3	5:00	Las Vegas, Nevada, United States	
Win	15–7	Dennis Bermudez	Submission (armbar)	The Ultimate Fighter: Team Bisping vs. Team Miller Finale	3 December 2011	1	4:51	Las Vegas, Nevada, United States	Won The Ultimate Fighter 14 Featherweight Tournament. Submission of the Night. Fight of the Night.
Win	14–7	Nick Buschman	KO (flying knee and punches)	Evolution Friday Night Fights 2	11 February 2011	1	2:14	Clovis, New Mexico, United States	
Win	13–7	Richard Villa	Submission (rear-naked choke)	Jackson's MMA Series 3	18 December 2010	2	3:31	Albuquerque, New Mexico, United States	
Win	12–7	Michael Casteel	KO (punch)	Evolution 1	30 October 2010	1	0:30	Clovis, New Mexico, United States	
Loss	11–7	Ururahy Rodrigues	Decision (unanimous)	Ultimate Warrior Challenge 8	22 May 2010	3	5:00	Fairfax, Virginia, United States	
Win	11–6	Derek Campos	Decision (split)	King of Kombat 8	27 February 2010	3	5:00	Austin, Texas, United States	
Loss	10–6	Gert Kocani	TKO (punches)	Battle at the Burg 2	30 January 2010	2	3:30	Penn Laird, Virginia, United States	
Loss	10–5	Ran Weathers	TKO (punch)	Supreme Warrior Championship 7	20 June 2009	1	2:56	Frisco, Texas, United States	
Win	10–4	Fernando Vieira	TKO (punches)	Mr. Cage 2	27 March 2009	2	3:31	Manaus, Brazil	
Win	9–4	James King	Submission (rear-naked choke)	King of Kombat 5	22 November 2008	1	1:53	Austin, Texas, United States	
Loss	8–4	Matt Veach	TKO (injury)	Pro Battle MMA: Immediate Impact	4 October 2008	2	1:28	Springdale, Arkansas, United States	
Win	8–3	Brian Foster	KO (punches)	TAP Entertainment: Fight Night	27 June 2008	1	1:34	Sallisaw, Oklahoma, United States	
Win	7–3	Orlean Smith	TKO (punches)	Amazon Tribal Kombat 1	29 March 2008	1	3:18	Manaus, Brazil	
Loss	6–3	Jorge Clay	Decision (unanimous)	Amazon Challenge 2	1 March 2008	3	5:00	Manaus, Brazil	
Win	6–2	Fabiano Silva	Decision (split)	Amazon Challenge 1	29 September 2007	3	5:00	Manaus, Brazil	
Win	5–2	Juarez Harles	KO (punch)	Amazon Challenge 1	29 September 2007	1	1:27	Manaus, Brazil	
Win	4–2	Arilson Paixao	TKO (punches)	Cassino Fight 4	15 September 2007	1	2:11	Manaus, Brazil	
Loss	3–2	Ronys Torres	TKO (punches)	Cassino Fight 3	21 April 2007	2	N/A	Brazil	
Loss	3–1	Daniel Trindade	Submission (rear-naked choke)	Roraima Combat 3	1 April 2007	3	2:25	Boa Vista, Brazil	
Win	3–0	Jorge Dalton	TKO (punches)	Manaus Moderna Fight	28 March 2007	1	N/A	Manaus, Brazil	
Win	2–0	Elifrank Cariolano	TKO (punches)	Cassino Fight 1	16 December 2006	1	3:41	Manaus, Brazil	
Win	1–0	Michel Addario	Submission (choke)	Mega Combat Vale Tudo	1 October 2005	3	3:20	Belém, Brazil	

=== Mixed martial arts exhibition record ===
Exhibition record breakdown		
3 matches	3 wins	0 losses
By knockout	3	0

Res.	Record	Opponent	Method	Event	Date	Round	Time	Location	Notes
Win	3–0	Bryan Caraway	KO (punches)	The Ultimate Fighter: Team Bisping vs. Team Miller	16 November 2011 (airdate)	1	4:15	Las Vegas, Nevada, United States	Semi-finals.
Win	2–0	Steven Siler	KO (punches)	The Ultimate Fighter: Team Bisping vs. Team Miller	2 November 2011 (airdate)	1	0:30	Las Vegas, Nevada, United States	Quarter-finals.
Win	1–0	Jesse Newell	KO (punches)	The Ultimate Fighter: Team Bisping vs. Team Miller	21 September 2011 (airdate)	1	0:47	Las Vegas, Nevada, United States	Preliminary bout.

== See also ==
- List of male mixed martial artists
