= Dennis Bermudez =

American mixed martial arts fighter (born 1986)

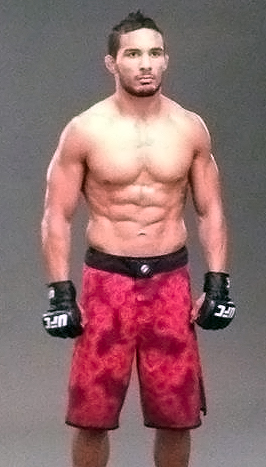
- Born: December 13, 1986 (age 39); Saugerties, New York, U.S.
- Other names: The Menace
- Height: 5 ft 6 in (1.68 m)
- Weight: 145 lb (66 kg; 10 st 5 lb)
- Division: Lightweight (2009–2010, 2019); Featherweight (2011–2018)
- Reach: 66 in (168 cm)
- Stance: Orthodox
- Fighting out of: Lindenhurst, New York, United States
- Team: Long Island MMA
- Wrestling: NCAA Division I Wrestling
- Years active: 2009–2019

Mixed martial arts record
- Total: 26
- Wins: 17
- By knockout: 4
- By submission: 3
- By decision: 10
- Losses: 9
- By knockout: 2
- By submission: 4
- By decision: 3

Other information
- Mixed martial arts record from Sherdog

Dennis Ross Bermudez (born December 13, 1986) is a retired American mixed martial artist who competed in the featherweight division of the Ultimate Fighting Championship (UFC). A professional competitor from 2009 to 2019, he made a name for himself mainly fighting on the East Coast, and was a competitor on Spike TV's The Ultimate Fighter: Team Bisping vs. Team Miller, where he became the runner-up.

== Wrestling ==
Bermudez began wrestling in 2000. Coached by Scott Wickham, he held a high school record of 112-23. From high school, he went on to wrestle at Bloomsburg University of Pennsylvania where in 2007 he was ranked 22nd in the nation at the Division 1 level. Bermudez then became a college free-style All-American during a match in Akron, Ohio.

== Mixed martial arts career ==
=== Early career ===
Bermudez first started training mixed martial arts in Saugerties, New York, his home town, in 2009. He later went on to train at Blackman MMA in Harrisburg, Pennsylvania. He trained at Blackman MMA for nearly two years as he competed as an amateur and professional. Bermudez competed in four amateur bouts before earning his professional license, finishing his amateur career with a perfect record of four wins and no losses. He began his pro career in 2009, opening his career with a record of 4-0, all four won via stoppage. The wins earned him a fight for Russian promotion, M-1 Global. The fight was held at the event M-1 Selection 2010 in New Jersey against Kevin Roddy. Bermudez controlled the entirety of the fight and won via unanimous decision. He was not selected to compete in the M-1 Global tournament, and never returned to fight for the promotion.

Bermudez returned to Pennsylvania Fighting Championships for one fight before signing with Shine Fights. Bermudez signed onto compete in Shine Fights 2010 Lightweight Grand Prix. His first fight in the tournament was against UFC veteran Shannon Gugerty. Bermudez won the fight via unanimous decision and moved onto fight UFC, MFC, Strikeforce, and DREAM veteran, Drew Fickett. Fickett handed Bermudez his first loss, submitting him in the first round via rear naked choke. He lost his second straight fight, also via rear naked choke, to undefeated Jordan Rinaldi. After the losses, Bermudez showed interest in dropping weight classes to compete at featherweight.

=== The Ultimate Fighter ===
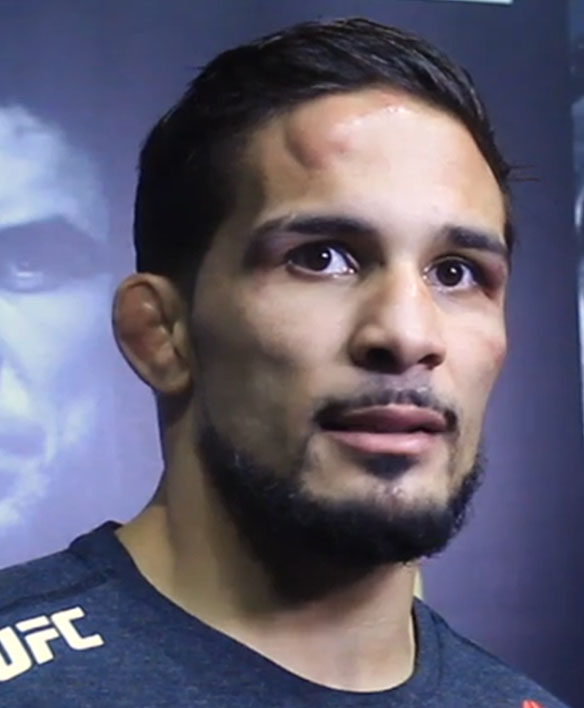
Dennis Bermudez's last fight at UFC Fight Night 143 post fight interview in New York, United States - Jan 19, 2019

In 2011, Bermudez signed with the Ultimate Fighting Championship to compete in The Ultimate Fighter: Team Bisping vs. Team Miller. In the first episode, Bermudez fought reigning King of the Cage bantamweight champion, Jimmie Rivera, to gain entry into the Ultimate Fighter house. After being rocked in the first round, Bermudez defeated Rivera in the second round via TKO.

Bermudez was selected to be a part of Team Miller as the team's first pick (second overall). In his quarterfinal bout, Bermudez fought Stephen Bass. Bermudez controlled the fight throughout round one before winning the fight in the second round via TKO.

Bermudez was selected to fight Team Bisping member Akira Corassani in the semi-finals. After being knocked down twice, Bermudez took Corassani down and finished the fight in the first round via submission due to a guillotine choke. With the win, Bermudez moved into the finals set to take place at The Ultimate Fighter 14 Finale. The submission also won Bermudez an additional $25,000 for the fan voted "Submission of the Season".

=== Ultimate Fighting Championship ===
Bermudez officially made his UFC debut on December 3, 2011, at The Ultimate Fighter 14 Finale against Diego Brandão of Team Bisping to determine the winner of The Ultimate Fighter 14. After a back-and-forth first round Bermudez knocked down Brandão and displayed strong ground and pound from the top position but while doing so Bermudez was caught in an armbar that ended the fight. The bout earned Fight of the Night honors, giving Bermudez an extra $40,000 in bonuses.

Bermudez next faced Pablo Garza at UFC on Fox 3 on May 5, 2012. He won the fight via unanimous decision.

Bermudez fought Tommy Hayden on August 11, 2012, at UFC 150. Bermudez won late into round one after clipping Hayden with a front kick to the chest, a straight right to the face then catching him in a guillotine choke, causing Hayden to submit. The performance earned Bermudez Submission of the Night honors.

Bermudez next faced Matt Grice on February 23, 2013, at UFC 157. Bermudez won via split decision. The back and forth action earned both fighters Fight of the Night honors and much praise from MMA observers proclaiming it was an early front runner for "Fight of the Year".

Bermudez faced Max Holloway on May 25, 2013, at UFC 160. He won the fight via split decision. 11 out of 11 media outlets scored the bout to Holloway.

Bermudez was briefly scheduled to face Nik Lentz on November 6, 2013, at UFC Fight Night 31. However, Lentz was pulled from the pairing with Bermudez in favor of a bout with Chad Mendes on December 14, 2013, at UFC on Fox 9. Bermudez instead fought Steven Siler as a replacement opponent. He won the fight via unanimous decision.

Bermudez next faced Jimy Hettes on March 15, 2014, at UFC 171. He won the fight via TKO in the third round and won his first Performance of the Night bonus award.

In his highest profile fight to date, Bermudez faced Clay Guida on July 26, 2014, at UFC on Fox 12. He won the bout via submission in the second round, and earned a Performance of the Night bonus award for the second time in a row.

Bermudez faced Ricardo Lamas on November 15, 2014, at UFC 180. He lost the fight via submission in the first round.

Bermudez faced Jeremy Stephens on July 11, 2015, at UFC 189. After a close first two rounds, he lost the fight by TKO in the third round.

Bermudez was expected to face Maximo Blanco on January 17, 2016, at UFC Fight Night 81. However, Bermudez pulled out of the fight in early December citing injury and was replaced by promotional newcomer Luke Sanders. Following a quick recovery, Bermudez was rebooked and he faced Tatsuya Kawajiri on February 21, 2016, at UFC Fight Night 83. He won the fight by unanimous decision.

Bermudez faced Rony Jason on August 6, 2016, at UFC Fight Night 92. He won the fight by unanimous decision.

Bermudez faced returning veteran Chan Sung Jung on February 4, 2017, at UFC Fight Night 104. He lost the fight by knockout in the first round.

Bermudez faced Darren Elkins on July 22, 2017, at UFC on Fox 25. He lost the back-and-forth fight via split decision.

Bermudez faced Andre Fili on January 27, 2018 at UFC on Fox 27. He lost the fight via split decision.

Bermudez faced Rick Glenn on July 14, 2018 at UFC Fight Night 133. He lost the fight via split decision.

Bermudez faced Te Edwards in a lightweight bout on January 19, 2019 at UFC Fight Night 143. He won the fight via unanimous decision. He announced his retirement after the fight, leaving his gloves in the Octagon.

== Personal life ==
Bermudez is of Puerto Rican and British descent. He has three children: two sons named Bryson and Maddox (with his then-girlfriend Lindsey Kuhn), and a daughter named Lulu (with his current partner Nina Sea).

Bermudez graduated from Bloomsburg University of Pennsylvania in 2009 with a degree in anthropology.

== Championships and accomplishments ==
- Ultimate Fighting Championship
  - Submission of the Season (The Ultimate Fighter 14) vs. Akira Corassani
  - Fight of the Night (Two times) vs. Diego Brandão and Matt Grice
  - Submission of the Night (One time) vs. Tommy Hayden
  - Performance of the Night (Two times) vs. Jimy Hettes and Clay Guida
  - Tied (Brian Ortega) for seventh most submission attempts in UFC Featherweight division history (12)
  - Third most control time in UFC Featherweight division history (1:10:49)
  - Third most takedowns landed in UFC Featherweight division history (46)
  - Fifth most top position time in UFC Featherweight division history (45:29)
  - Tied (Jesse Ronson & Zhalgas Zhumagulov) for most consecutive split decision losses in UFC history (3)
  - UFC.com Awards
    - 2013: Ranked #6 Fight of the Year vs. Matt Grice

== Mixed martial arts record ==
Professional record breakdown
26 matches	17 wins	9 losses
By knockout	4	2
By submission	3	4
By decision	10	3

Res.	Record	Opponent	Method	Event	Date	Round	Time	Location	Notes
Win	17–9	Te Edwards	Decision (unanimous)	UFC Fight Night: Cejudo vs. Dillashaw	January 19, 2019	3	5:00	Brooklyn, New York, United States	Return to Lightweight. Retired after bout.
Loss	16–9	Rick Glenn	Decision (split)	UFC Fight Night: dos Santos vs. Ivanov	July 14, 2018	3	5:00	Boise, Idaho, United States	
Loss	16–8	Andre Fili	Decision (split)	UFC on Fox: Jacaré vs. Brunson 2	January 27, 2018	3	5:00	Charlotte, North Carolina, United States	
Loss	16–7	Darren Elkins	Decision (split)	UFC on Fox: Weidman vs. Gastelum	July 22, 2017	3	5:00	Uniondale, New York, United States	
Loss	16–6	Chan Sung Jung	KO (punch)	UFC Fight Night: Bermudez vs. The Korean Zombie	February 4, 2017	1	2:49	Houston, Texas, United States	
Win	16–5	Rony Jason	Decision (unanimous)	UFC Fight Night: Rodríguez vs. Caceres	August 6, 2016	3	5:00	Salt Lake City, Utah, United States	
Win	15–5	Tatsuya Kawajiri	Decision (unanimous)	UFC Fight Night: Cowboy vs. Cowboy	February 21, 2016	3	5:00	Pittsburgh, Pennsylvania, United States	
Loss	14–5	Jeremy Stephens	TKO (flying knee and punches)	UFC 189	July 11, 2015	3	0:32	Las Vegas, Nevada, United States	Catchweight (149.5lbs) bout; Stephens missed weight.
Loss	14–4	Ricardo Lamas	Submission (guillotine choke)	UFC 180	November 15, 2014	1	3:18	Mexico City, Mexico	
Win	14–3	Clay Guida	Submission (rear-naked choke)	UFC on Fox: Lawler vs. Brown	July 26, 2014	2	2:57	San Jose, California, United States	Performance of the Night.
Win	13–3	Jimy Hettes	TKO (punches and knee)	UFC 171	March 15, 2014	3	2:57	Dallas, Texas, United States	Performance of the Night.
Win	12–3	Steven Siler	Decision (unanimous)	UFC: Fight for the Troops 3	November 6, 2013	3	5:00	Fort Campbell, Kentucky, United States	
Win	11–3	Max Holloway	Decision (split)	UFC 160	May 25, 2013	3	5:00	Las Vegas, Nevada, United States	
Win	10–3	Matt Grice	Decision (split)	UFC 157	February 23, 2013	3	5:00	Anaheim, California, United States	Fight of the Night.
Win	9–3	Tommy Hayden	Submission (guillotine choke)	UFC 150	August 11, 2012	1	4:43	Denver, Colorado, United States	Submission of the Night.
Win	8–3	Pablo Garza	Decision (unanimous)	UFC on Fox: Diaz vs. Miller	May 5, 2012	3	5:00	East Rutherford, New Jersey, United States	
Loss	7–3	Diego Brandão	Submission (straight armbar)	The Ultimate Fighter: Team Bisping vs. Team Miller Finale	December 3, 2011	1	4:51	Las Vegas, Nevada, United States	Featherweight debut. The Ultimate Fighter Featherweight Tournament final. Fight of the Night.
Loss	7–2	Jordan Rinaldi	Submission (rear-naked choke)	PA Fighting Championships 4	November 20, 2010	1	2:13	Harrisburg, Pennsylvania, United States	
Loss	7–1	Drew Fickett	Submission (rear-naked choke)	Shine Fights 3	September 10, 2010	1	2:02	Newkirk, Oklahoma, United States	Lightweight Grand Prix bout.
Win	7–0	Shannon Gugerty	Decision (unanimous)	Shine Fights 3	September 10, 2010	3	5:00	Newkirk, Oklahoma, United States	Lightweight Grand Prix bout.
Win	6–0	Joey Carroll	Decision (unanimous)	PA Fighting Championships 3	June 26, 2010	3	5:00	Harrisburg, Pennsylvania, United States	
Win	5–0	Kevin Roddy	Decision (unanimous)	M-1 Selection 2010: The Americas Round 1	April 3, 2010	3	5:00	Atlantic City, New Jersey, United States	
Win	4–0	Jeremiah Gurley	TKO (punches)	Deathroll MMA 2	March 12, 2010	1	1:55	Monessen, Pennsylvania, United States	
Win	3–0	Marcos Maciel	TKO (punches)	PA Fighting Championships 2	February 7, 2010	1	2:57	Harrisburg, Pennsylvania, United States	
Win	2–0	Jimmy Seipel	Submission (guillotine choke)	Asylum Fight League 25	February 6, 2010	2	0:41	Philadelphia, Pennsylvania, United States	
Win	1–0	Chris Connor	TKO (punches)	PA Fighting Championships 1	November 6, 2009	1	4:01	Harrisburg, Pennsylvania, United States	

=== Mixed martial arts exhibition record ===
Exhibition record breakdown		
3 matches	3 wins	0 losses
By knockout	2	0
By submission	1	0

Res.	Record	Opponent	Method	Event	Date	Round	Time	Location	Notes
Win	3–0	Akira Corassani	Submission (guillotine choke)	The Ultimate Fighter: Team Bisping vs. Team Miller	November 16, 2011 (airdate)	1	3:12	Las Vegas, Nevada, United States	Semi-finals.
Win	2–0	Stephen Bass	TKO (punches)	The Ultimate Fighter: Team Bisping vs. Team Miller	November 2, 2011 (airdate)	2	2:58	Las Vegas, Nevada, United States	Quarter-finals.
Win	1–0	Jimmie Rivera	TKO (punches)	The Ultimate Fighter: Team Bisping vs. Team Miller	September 21, 2011 (airdate)	2	1:40	Las Vegas, Nevada, United States	Preliminary bout.

== See also ==
- List of current UFC fighters
- List of male mixed martial artists
