= UFC 159 =

UFC mixed martial arts event in 2013

UFC 159: Jones vs. Sonnen
- The poster for UFC 159: Jones vs. Sonnen
- Promotion: Ultimate Fighting Championship
- Date: April 27, 2013
- Venue: Prudential Center
- City: Newark, New Jersey
- Attendance: 15,227
- Total gate: $2,700,000

Event chronology
UFC on Fox: Henderson vs. Melendez	UFC 159: Jones vs. Sonnen	UFC on FX: Belfort vs. Rockhold

UFC 159: Jones vs. Sonnen was a mixed martial arts event held on April 27, 2013, at the Prudential Center in Newark, New Jersey.

== Background ==
Jimy Hettes was expected to face Steven Siler at the event; however, Hettes was forced out of the bout with an injury and replaced by Kurt Holobaugh.

Joe Proctor was expected to face Al Iaquinta at the event. However, the bout was scrapped as both fighters sustained training injuries leading up to the fight.

Johnny Bedford was expected to face Erik Pérez at the event. However, Pérez pulled out of the bout just days before the event citing an injury and was replaced by Bryan Caraway.

Welterweights Nick Catone and James Head were scheduled to face each other on this card. However, at the weigh ins Catone missed weight and the bout was subsequently pulled from the card the day of the show after Catone went to the hospital for dehydration. The bout was scrapped as a result.

== Results ==
Main card
Weight class				Method	Round	Time	Notes
Light Heavyweight	Jon Jones (c)	def.	Chael Sonnen	TKO (punches and elbows)	1	4:33	(Note: For the UFC Light Heavyweight Championship.)
Middleweight	Michael Bisping	def.	Alan Belcher	Technical Decision (unanimous) (30–27, 30–27, 29–28)	3	4:31	(Note: Bout was stopped at 4:31 of round 3 as Bisping inadvertently poked Belcher in the eye, rendering him unable to continue.)
Heavyweight	Roy Nelson	def.	Cheick Kongo	KO (punches)	1	2:03
Light Heavyweight	Phil Davis	def.	Vinny Magalhaes	Decision (unanimous) (30–27, 30–27, 29–28)	3	5:00
Lightweight	Pat Healy	vs.	Jim Miller	No Contest (overturned)	3	4:02
Preliminary Card (FX)
Lightweight	Rustam Khabilov	def.	Yancy Medeiros	TKO (thumb injury)	1	2:32
Light Heavyweight	Ovince Saint Preux	def.	Gian Villante	Technical Decision (majority) (30–28, 30–29, 29–29)	3	0:33	(Note: Bout was stopped at 0:33 of round 3 as Saint Preux inadvertently poked Villante in the eye, rendering him unable to continue.)
Women's Bantamweight	Sara McMann	def.	Sheila Gaff	TKO (punches)	1	4:06
Bantamweight	Bryan Caraway	def.	Johnny Bedford	Submission (guillotine choke)	3	4:44
Preliminary Card (Facebook)
Featherweight	Cody McKenzie	def.	Leonard Garcia	Decision (unanimous) (29–28, 30–27, 30–27)	3	5:00
Featherweight	Steven Siler	def.	Kurt Holobaugh	Decision (unanimous) (29–28, 29–28, 29–28)	3	5:00

== Bonus Awards ==
The following fighters received $65,000 bonuses.

- Fight of the Night: Pat Healy vs. Jim Miller ^
- Knockout of the Night: Roy Nelson
- Submission of the Night: Bryan Caraway ^

^ Double bonus winner Pat Healy had his awards rescinded after testing positive for marijuana during his post fight drug screening.

== See also ==
- List of UFC events
- 2013 in UFC
