= Jimmie Rivera =

American mixed martial arts fighter

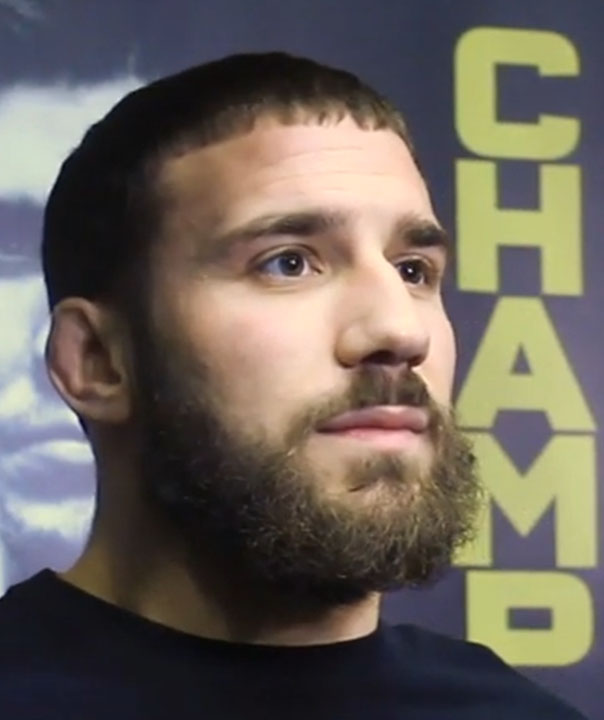
- Jimmie Rivera at UFC Fight Night 143 in Brooklyn, New York
- Born: June 29, 1989 (age 37); Ramsey, New Jersey, U.S.
- Other names: El Terror
- Height: 5 ft 4 in (1.63 m)
- Weight: 135 lb (61 kg; 9.6 st)
- Division: Bantamweight; Featherweight
- Reach: 68 in (173 cm)
- Stance: Orthodox
- Fighting out of: Manhattan, New York, U.S.
- Team: Team Tiger Schulmann
- Rank: 3rd degree black belt in Kyokushin Karate under Tiger Schulmann
- Years active: 2007–present

Mixed martial arts record
- Total: 28
- Wins: 23
- By knockout: 4
- By submission: 2
- By decision: 17
- Losses: 5
- By knockout: 1
- By decision: 4

Other information
- Mixed martial arts record from Sherdog

Jimmie Rivera (born June 29, 1989) is an American professional mixed martial artist and bare-knuckle boxer, currently signed to Bare Knuckle Fighting Championship (BKFC). Prior to signing with BKFC, Rivera competed in the UFC's Bantamweight division, and achieved status as a top 5 UFC bantamweight contender. Rivera has formerly competed for Bellator, the World Series of Fighting, CFFC and King of the Cage, where he was the KOTC Bantamweight Champion.

== Background ==
A native of Ramsey, New Jersey, Rivera was a former Ramsey High School wrestler.

== Mixed martial arts career ==
=== Early career ===
A Tiger Schulmann MMA product, Jimmie Rivera started his career in 2007 when he was 18 years old. After compiling an undefeated 7–0 record as an amateur within only two years, he moved to professional mixed martial arts.

As a professional, he fought only for New Jersey's promotion Ring of Combat before signing with Bellator in 2009.

=== Bellator Fighting Championships ===
Rivera made his debut on April 10, 2009, at Bellator 2 against Willie Gates. Rivera won via submission in the third round.

Rivera faced Nick Garcia on June 12, 2009, at Bellator 11. He defeated Garcia via unanimous decision.

=== King of the Cage ===
Rivera faced Abel Cullum on September 17, 2010, for the KOTC flyweight title. Rivera won via split decision (49-46 Rivera, 49-46 Rivera, 48-47 Cullum) after five rounds and became the new champion.

Rivera made a title defense against Jared Papazian on February 3, 2011. After five rounds he won via unanimous decision and retained his belt.

=== The Ultimate Fighter ===
Rivera appeared in the first episode of The Ultimate Fighter: Team Bisping vs. Team Miller. He lost via TKO in the second round against Dennis Bermudez during the entry round.

=== Return to Ring of Combat ===
Rivera returned to ROC on June 15, 2012, against Justin Hickey for the bantamweight title. He won the title via unanimous decision (30–27, 30–27, 30–27) in a three-round match.

Rivera defended his belt once against Joel Roberts on September 14, 2012.

Rivera was expected to face Anthony Leone on November 18, 2011. It was rescheduled to happen on April 27, 2012, but for undisclosed reasons the fight was scrapped.

=== Second Bellator run ===
Rivera faced Jesse Brock on December 7, 2012, at Bellator 83. He won via unanimous decision (30–27, 30–27, 29–28).

Rivera faced Brian Kelleher on April 4, 2013, at Bellator 95. He won via unanimous decision (30–27, 29–28, 29–28).

=== World Series of Fighting ===
Rivera faced Sidemar Honório on September 14, 2013, at WSOF 5. He was able to come through after taking a significant amount of damage in the first round, and managed to recover in the second and third rounds using his strength and wrestling skills. Rivera won the fight via unanimous decision (30–27, 29–28, 29–28).

=== Ultimate Fighting Championship ===
Rivera made his promotional debut and faced Marcus Brimage on July 18, 2015, at UFC Fight Night 72, replacing an injured Ian Entwistle. He won the fight via KO in the first round.

Rivera faced Pedro Munhoz on November 7, 2015, at UFC Fight Night 77. He won the fight via split decision.

Rivera faced Iuri Alcântara on January 30, 2016, at UFC on Fox 18. He won the fight by unanimous decision. The win also earned Rivera his first Fight of the Night bonus award.

Rivera faced Urijah Faber on September 10, 2016, at UFC 203. He won the fight by unanimous decision.

Rivera was expected to face Bryan Caraway on January 15, 2017, at UFC Fight Night 103. However, Caraway pulled out of the fight citing an injury, and Rivera rejected the replacement Marlon Vera due to the lack of rank and relevance in the division.

Rivera faced Thomas Almeida on July 22, 2017, at UFC on Fox 25. He won the fight by unanimous decision, extending his win streak to 20.

Rivera was expected to face Dominick Cruz on December 30, 2017, at UFC 219. However Cruz withdrew from the fight after he suffered a broken arm in training and was replaced by John Lineker. On December 24, Lineker pulled out of the fight citing a tooth infection. After a failed negotiation with Marlon Moraes in an attempt to remain on the card, Rivera announced that he would not compete at the event.

Rivera faced Marlon Moraes on June 1, 2018, in the main event at UFC Fight Night 131. He lost the fight by knockout in the first round due to a head kick and punches. This marked the first time Rivera had been finished in his professional MMA career.

Rivera faced John Dodson on September 8, 2018, at UFC 228. He won the fight via unanimous decision.

Rivera faced Aljamain Sterling on February 17, 2019, at UFC on ESPN 1. He lost the fight by unanimous decision.

Rivera faced Petr Yan on June 8, 2019, at UFC 238. He lost the fight via unanimous decision.

Rivera was scheduled to face Marlon Vera on February 8, 2020, at UFC 247. However, Rivera pulled out of the fight on January 23 citing an injury.

Rivera faced Cody Stamann in a featherweight bout on July 16, 2020, at UFC on ESPN: Kattar vs. Ige. He won the fight via unanimous decision.

A rematch against Pedro Munhoz was scheduled on January 30, 2021, at UFC on ESPN 20. On December 26, it was announced that the bout was moved to January 20, 2021, at UFC on ESPN 20. The pairing was rescheduled once again in early January as they were moved to UFC 258 on February 13, 2021, due to undisclosed reasons. During the week leading up to the event, the bout was delayed again due to a positive COVID-19 test for someone within the two camps. The pairing remained intact and instead took place on February 27, 2021, at UFC Fight Night: Rozenstruik vs. Gane. Rivera lost the fight via unanimous decision. This bout earned him a Fight of the Night bonus award.

In August 2021, it was reported that Rivera had finished his fight contract and was removed from the UFC roster.

==== Global Fight League ====
On December 11, 2024, it was announced that Rivera was signed by Global Fight League.

Rivera was scheduled to face Cameron Else on May 25, 2025 at GFL 2. However, all GFL events were cancelled indefinitely.

== Bare-knuckle boxing ==
In November 2021, it was announced that Rivera had signed an exclusive contract with Bare Knuckle Fighting Championship.

Rivera made his debut against Howard Davis on June 24, 2022, at BKFC 26. The back-and-forth bout ended in a majority draw.

Rivera faced Bekhzod Usmonov on May 19, 2023, at BKFC 43, and won the bout via unanimous decision.

Rivera faced Jeremy Stephens on December 2, 2023, at BKFC 56, and lost by TKO due to doctor stoppage.

Rivera faced two-time Bellator Featherweight World Champion Daniel Straus in the main event on May 11, 2024, at BKFC 61. He won the fight by unanimous decision.

Rivera was scheduled to compete for the BKFC Featherweight Championship against Kai Stewart in the main event on November 9, 2024 at BKFC on DAZN 2. He lost the fight by unanimous decision.

Rivera was scheduled to face former UFC Lightweight Champion Frankie Edgar on October 4, 2025 at BKFC 82. However, for undisclosed reasons, Edgar pulled out and was replaced by Timmy Mason. He won the fight by technical knockout in the third round.

Rivera faced Brandon Meyer on October 17, 2026 at BKFC 95. He won the fight by knockout in the fourth round. This fight earned him a Knockout of the Night award.

== Personal life ==
It was announced that Rivera graduated from New Jersey police academy in late January 2023.

== Championships and accomplishments ==
=== Mixed martial arts ===
- Ultimate Fighting Championship
  - Fight of the Night (Two times) vs. Iuri Alcântara and Pedro Munhoz
- Cage Fury Fighting Championships
  - CFFC Bantamweight Championship (One time)
    - One successful title defense
- King of the Cage
  - KOTC Flyweight (135 lb) Championship (One time)
  - One successful title defense
- Ring of Combat
  - ROC Bantamweight Championship (One time)
  - One successful title defense

=== Bare-knuckle boxing ===
- Bare Knuckle Fighting Championship
  - Knockout of the Night (One time) vs. Brandon Meyer

== Mixed martial arts record ==
Professional record breakdown
28 matches	23 wins	5 losses
By knockout	4	1
By submission	2	0
By decision	17	4

Res.	Record	Opponent	Method	Event	Date	Round	Time	Location	Notes
Loss	23–5	Pedro Munhoz	Decision (unanimous)	UFC Fight Night: Rozenstruik vs. Gane	February 27, 2021	3	5:00	Las Vegas, Nevada, United States	Fight of the Night.
Win	23–4	Cody Stamann	Decision (unanimous)	UFC on ESPN: Kattar vs. Ige	July 16, 2020	3	5:00	Abu Dhabi, United Arab Emirates	Featherweight bout.
Loss	22–4	Petr Yan	Decision (unanimous)	UFC 238	June 8, 2019	3	5:00	Chicago, Illinois, United States	
Loss	22–3	Aljamain Sterling	Decision (unanimous)	UFC on ESPN: Ngannou vs. Velasquez	February 17, 2019	3	5:00	Phoenix, Arizona, United States	
Win	22–2	John Dodson	Decision (unanimous)	UFC 228	September 8, 2018	3	5:00	Dallas, Texas, United States	
Loss	21–2	Marlon Moraes	KO (head kick and punches)	UFC Fight Night: Rivera vs. Moraes	June 1, 2018	1	0:33	Utica, New York, United States	
Win	21–1	Thomas Almeida	Decision (unanimous)	UFC on Fox: Weidman vs. Gastelum	July 22, 2017	3	5:00	Uniondale, New York, United States	
Win	20–1	Urijah Faber	Decision (unanimous)	UFC 203	September 10, 2016	3	5:00	Cleveland, Ohio, United States	
Win	19–1	Iuri Alcântara	Decision (unanimous)	UFC on Fox: Johnson vs. Bader	January 30, 2016	3	5:00	Newark, New Jersey, United States	Fight of the Night.
Win	18–1	Pedro Munhoz	Decision (split)	UFC Fight Night: Belfort vs. Henderson 3	November 7, 2015	3	5:00	São Paulo, Brazil	
Win	17–1	Marcus Brimage	KO (punches)	UFC Fight Night: Bisping vs. Leites	July 18, 2015	1	1:29	Glasgow, Scotland	
Win	16–1	Carson Beebe	KO (punch)	CFFC 48: Good vs. Burrell	May 9, 2015	1	0:16	Atlantic City, New Jersey, United States	Defended the CFFC Bantamweight Championship.
Win	15–1	Anthony Durnell	TKO (punch)	CFFC 43: Webb vs. Good	November 1, 2014	3	3:22	Atlantic City, New Jersey, United States	Won the vacant CFFC Bantamweight Championship.
Win	14–1	Cody Stevens	Decision (unanimous)	CFFC 35: Heckman vs. Makashvili	April 26, 2014	3	5:00	Atlantic City, New Jersey, United States	
Win	13–1	Sidemar Honório	Decision (unanimous)	WSOF 5	September 14, 2013	3	5:00	Atlantic City, New Jersey, United States	
Win	12–1	Brian Kelleher	Decision (unanimous)	Bellator 95	April 4, 2013	3	5:00	Atlantic City, New Jersey, United States	Catchweight (140 lbs) bout.
Win	11–1	Jesse Brock	Decision (unanimous)	Bellator 83	December 7, 2012	3	5:00	Atlantic City, New Jersey, United States	
Win	10–1	Joel Roberts	Decision (unanimous)	Ring of Combat 42	September 14, 2012	3	5:00	Atlantic City, New Jersey, United States	Defended the Ring of Combat Bantamweight Championship.
Win	9–1	Justin Hickey	Decision (unanimous)	Ring of Combat 41	June 15, 2012	3	5:00	Atlantic City, New Jersey, United States	Won the Ring of Combat Bantamweight Championship.
Win	8–1	Jared Papazian	Decision (unanimous)	KOTC: Empire	February 3, 2011	5	5:00	San Bernardino, California, United States	Defended the KOTC Flyweight Championship.
Win	7–1	Abel Cullum	Decision (split)	KOTC: No Mercy	September 17, 2010	5	5:00	Mashantucket, Connecticut, United States	Won the KOTC Flyweight Championship.
Win	6–1	Carlos David	KO (punches)	Ring of Combat 29	April 16, 2010	2	2:59	Atlantic City, New Jersey, United States	
Win	5–1	Claudio Ledesma	Decision (unanimous)	UCC 1: Merciless	March 19, 2010	3	5:00	Jersey City, New Jersey, United States	
Win	4–1	Nick Garcia	Decision (unanimous)	Bellator 11	June 12, 2009	3	5:00	Uncasville, Connecticut, United States	
Win	3–1	Willie Gates	Submission (triangle choke)	Bellator 2	April 10, 2009	3	3:17	Uncasville, Connecticut, United States	
Win	2–1	Tyler Venice	Technical Submission (rear-naked choke)	Ring of Combat 23	February 20, 2009	2	1:13	Atlantic City, New Jersey, United States	Bantamweight debut.
Loss	1–1	Jason McLean	Decision (split)	Ring of Combat 22	November 21, 2008	3	4:00	Atlantic City, New Jersey, United States	Catchweight (150 lbs) bout.
Win	1–0	Fernando Bernandino	Decision (unanimous)	Ring of Combat 21	September 12, 2008	2	4:00	Atlantic City, New Jersey, United States	Catchweight (150 lbs) bout.

=== Mixed martial arts exhibition record ===
Exhibition record breakdown		
1 match	0 wins	1 loss
By knockout	0	1

Res.	Record	Opponent	Method	Event	Date	Round	Time	Location	Notes
Loss	0–1	Dennis Bermudez	TKO (punches)	The Ultimate Fighter: Team Bisping vs. Team Miller	September 21, 2011 (airdate)	2	1:40	Las Vegas, Nevada, United States	Preliminary bout.

== Bare knuckle boxing record ==
Professional record breakdown
7 matches	4 wins	2 losses
By knockout	2	1
By decision	2	1
Draws	1	

Res.	Record	Opponent	Method	Event	Date	Round	Time	Location	Notes
Win	4–2–1	Brandon Meyer	KO	BKFC 95	October 17, 2026	4	0:46	Newark, New Jersey, United States	
Win	3–2–1	Timmy Mason	TKO	BKFC 82	October 4, 2025	3	0:20	Newark, New Jersey, United States	
Loss	2–2–1	Kai Stewart	Decision (unanimous)	BKFC on DAZN Montana: Stewart vs. Rivera	November 9, 2024	5	2:00	Billings, Montana, United States	For the BKFC Featherweight Championship.
Win	2–1–1	Daniel Straus	Decision (unanimous)	BKFC 61	May 11, 2024	5	2:00	Uncasville, Connecticut, United States	Return to Featherweight.
Loss	1–1–1	Jeremy Stephens	TKO (doctor stoppage)	BKFC 56	December 2, 2023	3	2:00	Salt Lake City, Utah, United States	Lightweight debut
Win	1–0–1	Bekhzod Usmonov	Decision (unanimous)	BKFC 43	May 19, 2023	5	2:00	Omaha, Nebraska, United States	
Draw	0–0–1	Howard Davis	Draw (majority)	BKFC 26	June 24, 2022	5	2:00	Hollywood, Florida, United States	

== See also ==
- List of Bellator MMA alumni
- List of male mixed martial artists
