= Pablo Garza (fighter) =

American mixed martial arts fighter

- Born: Pablo Garza; September 16, 1983 (age 43); Wasco, California, United States
- Other names: The Scarecrow
- Nationality: American
- Height: 6 ft 1 in (1.85 m)
- Weight: 145 lb (66 kg; 10.4 st)
- Division: Lightweight (formerly); Featherweight
- Reach: 75 in (190 cm)
- Fighting out of: Fargo, North Dakota, United States
- Team: Academy of Combat Arts
- Rank: Brown belt in Brazilian jiu-jitsu
- Years active: 2007–2013

Mixed martial arts record
- Total: 16
- Wins: 12
- By knockout: 2
- By submission: 7
- By decision: 3
- Losses: 4
- By knockout: 0
- By submission: 3
- By decision: 1
- Draws: 0

Other information
- University: University of North Dakota
- Mixed martial arts record from Sherdog

Pablo Garza (born September 16, 1983) is a former American mixed martial artist who fought in the Featherweight division. He has competed for the UFC, WEC, and was a contestant on The Ultimate Fighter: Team GSP vs. Team Koscheck.

== Early life ==
Garza was born in Wasco, California, on September 16, 1983, to parents who both emigrated from Mexico. Garza and his family moved to North Dakota, where he attended high school and played baseball, basketball, and track. He continued to play basketball in college for two years at the University of Jamestown, as a point guard. He eventually earned a degree in exercise science and personal training at the University of North Dakota. While Garza was in college, he worked two jobs at a factory making windmill blades, and also did an internship at a gym.

== Early career ==
Garza trains out of Dylan Spicers' MMA gym the Academy of Combat Arts in Fargo, North Dakota, as well as the Academy in Brooklyn Center, Minnesota with the likes of Jacob Volkmann, Nik Lentz, Pat Barry and coach Greg Nelson. Garza is a predominantly ground-based muay thai fighter, where he has managed to secure several submission victories. A Fargo, North Dakota-based Mexican American from Grafton, North Dakota,

Prior to joining the UFC, Garza appeared for promotions such as King of the Cage and Brutal Fight Night.

=== The Ultimate Fighter ===
Garza then signed with the Ultimate Fighting Championship to appear on The Ultimate Fighter: Team GSP vs. Team Koscheck.

In the debut episode, Garza lost to touted prospect Michael Johnson in a two-round decision.

=== Outside promotions ===
After leaving the UFC, Garza fought in smaller, outside promotions. Before his Ultimate Fighter fight with Michael Johnson had even aired on television, Garza faced William Joplin, winning via unanimous decision. The fight, which was predominantly stand-up based, saw Garza break the nose of Joplin, before taking control of the fight.

Garza then faced Aaron Steele on September 11, 2010. In preparation for the fight, Garza visited Minnesota Martial Arts Academy, training with Sean Sherk, Jacob Volkmann and Greg Nelson. Garza went on to win the fight via TKO (punches) late in the third round.

=== World Extreme Cagefighting ===
Garza was then signed by the UFC's sister promotion, World Extreme Cagefighting. Replacing Jason Reinhardt, Garza stepped up to face Tiequan Zhang on the undercard of WEC 51 on 5 days notice. He lost the fight via submission in the first round.

=== Ultimate Fighting Championship ===
In October 2010, World Extreme Cagefighting merged with the Ultimate Fighting Championship. As part of the merger, all WEC fighters were transferred to the UFC.

Garza made his UFC and featherweight debut against Fredson Paixão at The Ultimate Fighter: Team GSP vs. Team Koscheck Finale. This was the first ever featherweight fight in the UFC. Garza knocked Paixão out 51 seconds into the first round with a flying knee. After being unconscious for nearly two minutes, Paixão was on his back for close to four minutes while being given oxygen, before being placed in a neck brace and carried out on a stretcher. Garza earned Knockout of the Night honors for the performance.

Garza defeated Yves Jabouin on April 30, 2011 at UFC 129 via first round submission due to a flying triangle choke. The finish earned him Submission of the Night honors and $129,000.

Garza faced Dustin Poirier on November 12, 2011 at UFC on Fox 1. He lost the fight in the second round after tapping out to a d'arce choke.

Garza next faced Dennis Bermudez at UFC on Fox 3 on May 5, 2012. He lost the fight via unanimous decision (30-27, 30-27, 30-27).

Garza was expected to face Josh Grispi on August 4, 2012 at UFC on FOX 4. However, Garza was forced out of the bout with an injury and replaced by Rani Yahya.

Garza faced Mark Hominick on November 17, 2012 at UFC 154. He won the fight by unanimous decision.

Garza faced Diego Brandão on April 6, 2013 at UFC on Fuel TV 9. He lost the fight via first round submission and was subsequently released from the promotion.

=== Post UFC ===
Shortly after his release from the UFC, Garza relocated to Oslo, Norway. It was expected that he would receive offers from the elite European MMA promotions such as Britain's Cage Warriors and BAMMA or Sweden's Superior Challenge. However, Garza has not competed since his release from the UFC.

== Championships and accomplishments ==
- Ultimate Fighting Championship
  - UFC.com Awards
    - 2010: Ranked #5 Knockout of the Year vs. Fredson Paixão
    - 2011: Ranked #3 Submission of the Year vs. Yves Jabouin

== Mixed martial arts record ==
Professional record breakdown
16 matches	12 wins	4 losses
By knockout	2	0
By submission	7	3
By decision	3	1

Res.	Record	Opponent	Method	Event	Date	Round	Time	Location	Notes
Loss	12–4	Diego Brandão	Submission (arm-triangle choke)	UFC on Fuel TV: Mousasi vs. Latifi	April 6, 2013	1	3:27	Stockholm, Sweden	
Win	12–3	Mark Hominick	Decision (unanimous)	UFC 154	November 17, 2012	3	5:00	Montreal, Quebec, Canada	
Loss	11–3	Dennis Bermudez	Decision (unanimous)	UFC on Fox: Diaz vs. Miller	May 5, 2012	3	5:00	East Rutherford, New Jersey, United States	
Loss	11–2	Dustin Poirier	Submission (D'Arce choke)	UFC on Fox: Velasquez vs. dos Santos	November 12, 2011	2	1:32	Anaheim, California, United States	
Win	11–1	Yves Jabouin	Submission (flying triangle choke)	UFC 129	April 30, 2011	1	4:31	Toronto, Ontario, Canada	Submission of the Night
Win	10–1	Fredson Paixão	KO (flying knee)	The Ultimate Fighter 12 Finale	December 4, 2010	1	0:51	Las Vegas, Nevada, United States	Featherweight debut; Knockout of the Night.
Loss	9–1	Zhang Tiequan	Submission (guillotine choke)	WEC 51	September 30, 2010	1	2:26	Broomfield, Colorado, United States	
Win	9–0	Aaron Steele	TKO (punches)	Crowbar MMA: Fall Brawl	September 11, 2010	3	2:57	Fargo, North Dakota, United States	
Win	8–0	William Joplin	Decision (unanimous)	The Cage Inc.: Battle at the Border 6	August 21, 2010	3	5:00	Hankinson, North Dakota, United States	
Win	7–0	Nate Bell	Submission (punches)	KOTC: Ice Age	March 5, 2010	1	1:00	Mahnomen, Minnesota, United States	
Win	6–0	Jayson Fuentes	Submission (rear-naked choke)	EB: Beatdown at 4 Bears 6	February 13, 2010	2	4:54	New Town, North Dakota, United States	
Win	5–0	Caleb Wolff	Submission (armbar)	Brutaal Fight Night: All American Cage Fighting	December 12, 2009	1	3:37	Bismarck, North Dakota, United States	
Win	4–0	Mitch Jackson	Submission (triangle choke)	Max Fights 6	August 29, 2009	1	0:53	Fargo, North Dakota, United States	
Win	3–0	Jonathan Knutson	Decision (unanimous)	EB: Beatdown at 4 Bears 4	March 21, 2009	3	5:00	New Town, North Dakota, United States	
Win	2–0	Tyler Larson	Submission (kimura)	Max Fights 4	July 19, 2008	1	3:38	Fargo, North Dakota, United States	
Win	1–0	Mike Davis	Submission (guillotine choke)	KO: Productions	August 11, 2007	1	0:38	Grand Forks, North Dakota, United States	
