= Dustin Neace =

American mixed martial arts fighter

- Born: Franklin, Indiana, United States
- Other names: The Beast
- Nationality: American
- Height: 5 ft 9 in (1.75 m)
- Weight: 144.2 lb (65.4 kg; 10.30 st)
- Division: Featherweight; Lightweight
- Reach: 69.0 in (175 cm)
- Fighting out of: Indianapolis, Indiana, United States
- Team: Damage Incorporated
- Years active: 2006–present

Mixed martial arts record
- Total: 47
- Wins: 25
- By knockout: 5
- By submission: 20
- Losses: 21
- By knockout: 3
- By submission: 13
- By decision: 5
- Draws: 1

Other information
- Mixed martial arts record from Sherdog

Dustin Neace is an American mixed martial artist who fought in Ultimate Fighting Championship and Strikeforce and was a competitor on The Ultimate Fighter: Team Bisping vs. Team Miller. Neace formerly fought in the featherweight division of Bellator.

== MMA career ==
=== Strikeforce ===
Neace faced Jeff Curran on November 7, 2009, at Strikeforce: Fedor vs. Rogers. He lost via submission in the first round.

=== The Ultimate Fighter ===
In 2011, Neace had signed with the Ultimate Fighting Championship to compete on The Ultimate Fighter: Team Bisping vs. Team Miller. In the first episode, Neace fought Josh Clopton to gain entry into the Ultimate Fighter house. Neace defeated Clopton via unanimous decision (20–18, 20–18, 20–18) after two rounds. Neace was selected as a part of Team Miller, being the third featherweight chosen for the team.

In episodes three through five, Neace was shown multiple times in altercations with Team Bisping fighter, Akira Corassani. The two would later be paired in a bout against each other in the preliminary round. During the fight, inside the first round, Neace applied a heel hook submission that looked like Corassani tapped to; however referee Herb Dean did not stop the fight and Corassani was released from the hold. Corassani went on to defeat Neace via a majority decision after two rounds.

=== Ultimate Fighting Championship ===
Neace made his UFC debut on December 3, 2011, at The Ultimate Fighter 14 Finale against his former Ultimate Fighter teammate Bryan Caraway. Neace lost the bout via submission in the second round and was subsequently released from the promotion.

=== Bellator Fighting Championships ===
Neace made his Bellator debut on November 16, 2012, at Bellator 81 against Marlon Sandro. Neace lost via technical submission in the first round and was subsequently released from the promotion.

== Championships and accomplishments ==
=== Mixed martial arts ===
- Coliseum Combat
  - CC Featherweight Championship (2010,2013)
- Conquest Fighting Championships
  - Conquest FC Featherweight Championship (2012)
- Courage Fighting Championships
  - CFC Featherweight Championship (2008)
- King of Kombat (
  - KOK Featherweight Championship (2008)
- Legends of Fighting
  - LOF Featherweight Championship (2010)
- Freestyle Combat Challenge
  - FCC Four-man Featherweight Tournament Winner (2008)

== Mixed martial arts record ==
Professional record breakdown
48 matches	25 wins	21 losses
By knockout	5	3
By submission	20	13
By decision	0	5
By disqualification	0	0
Draws	1	
No contests	1	

Res.	Record	Opponent	Method	Event	Date	Round	Time	Location	Notes
NC	25–21–1 (1)	Kenny Jordan	NC (Overturned by Indiana Gaming Commission)	Coliseum Combat 26: Neace vs. Jordan	September 28, 2013	4	5:00	Kokomo, Indiana, United States	For the Coliseum Combat Featherweight Championship.
Loss	25–21–1	Cody Stevens	Decision (Majority)	Revelation Fight Organization: Big Guns 12	August 31, 2013	3	5:00	Mansfield, Ohio, United States	
Win	25–20–1	Bobby Emmons	Submission (rear naked choke)	Coliseum Combat 24	March 30, 2013	3	2:02	Kokomo, Indiana, United States	Won the CC Featherweight Championship.
Loss	24–20–1	Marlon Sandro	Technical submission (rear-naked choke)	Bellator 81	November 16, 2012	1	2:05	Kingston, Rhode Island, United States	
Win	24–19–1	Peter Dominguez	Submission (guillotine choke)	Griggs Entertainment: Conquest FC 1	September 29, 2012	1	0:16	Terre Haute, Indiana, United States	Won the Conquest FC Featherweight Championship.
Loss	23–19–1	Brian Geraghty	Decision (split)	Indy MMA 2	March 31, 2012	3	5:00	Indianapolis, Indiana, United States	
Loss	23–18–1	Bryan Caraway	Submission (rear-naked choke)	The Ultimate Fighter 14 Finale	December 3, 2011	2	3:38	Paradise, Nevada, United States	
Loss	23–17–1	David Love	Submission (armbar)	Colosseum Combat 16	February 19, 2011	2	3:45	Kokomo, Indiana, United States	
Win	23–16–1	Joel Blanton	TKO (punches)	Colosseum Combat 15	October 9, 2010	1	3:43	Kokomo, Indiana, United States	Won the CC Featherweight Championship.
Win	22–16–1	Corey Mahon	KO (punches)	Legends of Fighting 41: Damage Incorporated	September 10, 2010	3	4:54	Indianapolis, Indiana, United States	Won Legends of Fighting Featherweight Championship.
Loss	21–16–1	João Herdy	Decision (unanimous)	Premier Cage Fighting: Total Warrior Challenge 6	June 12, 2010	3	5:00	Indianapolis, Indiana, United States	
Win	21–15–1	York Ash	Submission (armbar)	Legends of Fighting 38	April 9, 2010	2	1:26	Indianapolis, Indiana, United States	
Win	20–15–1	Anthony Marti	Submission (rear-naked choke)	Ruckus Entertainment - Ruckus 2	March 12, 2010	1	3:53	Addison, Illinois, United States	
Win	19–15–1	Michael Glenn	Submission (rear-naked choke)	Legends of Fighting 36	January 8, 2010	1	2:56	Indianapolis, Indiana, United States	
Loss	18–15–1	Jeff Curran	Submission (rib injury)	Strikeforce: Fedor vs. Rogers	November 7, 2009	1	1:39	Hoffman Estates, Illinois, United States	Catchweight (150 lbs) bout.
Loss	18–14–1	Nick Gonzalez	TKO (corner stoppage)	King of Kombat 7 - Judgment Day	August 29, 2009	2	0:10	Austin, Texas, United States	Lost King of Kombat Featherweight Championship.
Loss	18–13–1	Tommy Hayden	Submission (rear-naked choke)	War in the Yard	August 9, 2009	2	N/A	Anderson, Indiana, United States	
Win	18–12–1	Johnny Bedford	Submission (kneebar)	King of Kombat 5: Season's Beatings	November 22, 2008	1	1:38	Austin, Texas, United States	Won King of Kombat Featherweight Championship.
Loss	17–12–1	Brian Geraghty	Submission (triangle choke)	Revolution Fight League: Proving Ground	July 26, 2008	3	2:15	Louisville, Kentucky, United States	
Loss	17–11–1	Jared McMahan	Submission (armbar)	Corral Combat Classic 2	April 26, 2008	1	0:38	Hammond, Indiana, United States	
Win	17–10–1	Jake Corry	Submission (rear-naked choke)	Courage Fighting Championships 10	March 22, 2008	1	1:30	Terre Haute, Indiana, United States	Won CFC Featherweight Championship.
Loss	16–10–1	Arman Loktev	TKO (punches)	NAAFS: Caged Fury 4	February 16, 2008	1	1:06	Cleveland, Ohio, United States	
Win	16–9–1	Jeremy Ashley	TKO (punches)	Freestyle Combat Challenge 32	January 12, 2008	1	4:59	Kenosha, Wisconsin, United States	Won FCC Four-Man Featherweight Tournament.
Win	15–9–1	Rich Taylor	Submission (guillotine choke)	Freestyle Combat Challenge 32	January 12, 2008	1	N/A	Kenosha, Wisconsin, United States	
Loss	14–9–1	Vadim Ivanov	Submission (punches)	NAAFS: Caged Fury 3	November 3, 2007	2	0:22	Cleveland, Ohio, United States	For NAAFS Lightweight Championship.
Win	14–8–1	Wade Markland	Submission (rear-naked choke)	Legends of Fighting 19: Back in Action	July 27, 2007	1	1:27	Indianapolis, Indiana, United States	
Win	13–8–1	Kirk Birchum	TKO (punches)	Legends of Fighting 18: Pole Position	May 25, 2007	1	1:49	Indianapolis, Indiana, United States	
Win	12–8–1	James Powell	Submission (verbal)	Legends of Fighting 16: Heat	May 5, 2007	1	2:30	Lafayette, Indiana, United States	
Win	11–8–1	David Hampton	Submission (rear-naked choke)	Legends of Fighting 15: Vengeance	April 27, 2007	1	0:17	Indianapolis, Indiana, United States	
Loss	10–8–1	Alonzo Martinez	Submission (punches)	Glory FC 1: Genesis	April 20, 2007	1	1:10	Des Moines, Iowa, United States	
Win	10–7–1	Jack O'Neil	Submission (choke)	Legends of Fighting: Revolution 4	April 13, 2007	1	1:47	Plainfield, Indiana, United States	
Win	9–7–1	John Paun	Submission (triangle choke)	Pure Force V: Vendetta	March 31, 2007	1	1:53	Tinley Park, Illinois, United States	
Loss	8–7–1	Nick Sorg	Submission (rear-naked choke)	Legends of Fighting 14: Resurrection	March 23, 2007	1	1:31	Indianapolis, Indiana, United States	
Loss	8–6–1	Jameel Massouh	Decision (unanimous)	Freestyle Combat Challenge 26	March 10, 2007	3	5:00	Kenosha, Wisconsin, United States	
Draw	8–5–1	Dan Swift	Draw (majority)	Legends of Fighting 13: Bad Blood	January 26, 2007	3	5:00	Indianapolis, Indiana, United States	
Loss	8–5	Raymond Hunter	Decision (split)	Freestyle Combat Challenge 25	January 13, 2007	3	5:00	Kenosha, Wisconsin, United States	
Win	8–4	Tim Bradley	Submission (guillotine choke)	Legends of Fighting 12: Black Tie Battles	December 31, 2006	1	0:17	Indianapolis, Indiana, United States	
Win	7–4	Johnny Bedford	Submission (armbar)	Genesis 5	November 25, 2006	2	0:56	Findlay, Ohio, United States	
Loss	6–4	Mike Bogner	Submission (guillotine choke)	Legends of Fighting 10: Unbreakable	November 3, 2006	2	3:58	Indianapolis, Indiana, United States	
Win	6–3	Tommy Ridenbaugh	Submission (triangle choke)	NAAFS: Caged Vengeance 2	October 7, 2006	1	0:50	Cleveland, Ohio, United States	
Win	5–3	Paul Hayes	TKO (punches)	Legends of Fighting 9	September 29, 2006	1	2:57	Indianapolis, Indiana, United States	
Loss	4–3	Kevin Manderson	TKO (punches)	Gladiators Cage Fighting: Colosseum 3	September 23, 2006	2	1:33	Winnipeg, Manitoba, Canada	
Loss	4–2	Mike Brown	Submission (guillotine choke)	Absolute Fighting Championships 18	August 26, 2006	1	0:50	Boca Raton, Florida, United States	
Win	4–1	Jason Thile	Submission (armbar)	Evolution 2	July 15, 2006	1	1:49	Greenfield, Indiana, United States	
Loss	3–1	Jameel Massouh	Submission	Diesel Fighting Championships 1	June 30, 2006	3	4:50	Dallas, Texas, United States	
Win	3–0	Mike Morgan	Submission (guillotine choke)	Legends of Fighting 7: Divide & Conquer	June 17, 2006	1	N/A	Marion County, Indiana, United States	
Win	2–0	Merritt Warren	Submission (rear-naked choke)	HOOKnSHOOT: Live	May 20, 2006	1	N/A	Evansville, Indiana, United States	
Win	1–0	Eugene Crisler	Submission (rear-naked choke)	Madtown Throwdown 7	April 29, 2006	N/A	N/A	Madison, Wisconsin, United States	
