= UFC 171 =

UFC mixed martial arts event in 2014

UFC 171: Hendricks vs. Lawler
- The poster for UFC 171: Hendricks vs. Lawler
- Promotion: Ultimate Fighting Championship
- Date: March 15, 2014
- Venue: American Airlines Center
- City: Dallas, Texas
- Attendance: 19,324
- Total gate: $2,600,000
- Buyrate: 300,000

Event chronology
| UFC Fight Night: Gustafsson vs. Manuwa | UFC 171: Hendricks vs. Lawler | UFC Fight Night: Shogun vs. Henderson 2 |

UFC 171: Hendricks vs. Lawler was a mixed martial arts event that was held on March 15, 2014, at the American Airlines Center in Dallas, Texas.

The event was released on DVD on June 17, 2014. The DVD was distributed by Anchor Bay Entertainment.

== Background ==
A UFC Light Heavyweight Championship bout between the current champion Jon Jones and Glover Teixeira, briefly linked as the event headliner at UFC 169, and UFC 170 was expected to headline this event. However, the fight was postponed and moved to UFC 172.

A UFC Welterweight Championship bout between Johny Hendricks and Robbie Lawler for the vacant title headlined the event.

Julianna Peña was expected to face Jéssica Andrade at this event. However, Pena pulled out of the bout citing an injury to the knee and was replaced by Raquel Pennington.

Darrell Montague was expected to face Will Campuzano at this event. However, Montague was forced to pull out of the bout citing an injury and was replaced by Justin Scoggins.

Thiago Silva was expected to face Ovince St. Preux at this event. However, Silva was removed from the bout due to police apprehension and release for multiple counts of aggravated assault. This led to his subsequent release from the promotion. He was replaced by Nikita Krylov.

Tor Troéng was expected to face Bubba McDaniel at this event. However, Troeng was forced out of the bout due to an injury and was replaced by UFC newcomer Sean Strickland.

The televised preliminary portion of the card aired on Fox Sports 2.

Renée Forte weighed in one pound over the lightweight limit of 156 lb. He decided not to cut the additional pound, so had to surrender 20% of his purse to his opponent, Francisco Treviño.

== Results ==
Main card
| Weight class | | | | Method | Round | Time | Notes |
|---|---|---|---|---|---|---|---|
| Welterweight | Johny Hendricks | def. | Robbie Lawler | Decision (unanimous) (48–47, 48–47, 48–47) | 5 | 5:00 | (Note: For the vacant UFC Welterweight Championship.) |
| Welterweight | Tyron Woodley | def. | Carlos Condit | TKO (knee injury) | 2 | 2:00 |
| Lightweight | Myles Jury | def. | Diego Sanchez | Decision (unanimous) (30–27, 30–27, 29–28) | 3 | 5:00 |
| Welterweight | Héctor Lombard | def. | Jake Shields | Decision (unanimous) (30–27, 30–27, 29–28) | 3 | 5:00 |
| Light Heavyweight | Ovince Saint Preux | def. | Nikita Krylov | Technical Submission (Von Flue choke) | 1 | 1:29 |
Preliminary card (Fox Sports 2)
| Welterweight | Kelvin Gastelum | def. | Rick Story | Decision (split) (28–29, 29–28, 30–27) | 3 | 5:00 |
| Women's Bantamweight | Jéssica Andrade | def. | Raquel Pennington | Decision (split) (29–28, 28–29, 29–28) | 3 | 5:00 |
| Featherweight | Dennis Bermudez | def. | Jimy Hettes | TKO (punches and knee) | 3 | 2:57 |
| Welterweight | Alex Garcia | def. | Sean Spencer | Decision (split) (29–28, 28–29, 30–27) | 3 | 5:00 |
Preliminary card (UFC Fight Pass)
| Catchweight (157 lb) | Francisco Treviño | def. | Renée Forte | Decision (unanimous) (29–28, 29–28, 29–28) | 3 | 5:00 |
| Flyweight | Justin Scoggins | def. | Will Campuzano | Decision (unanimous) (30–27, 30–27, 30–27) | 3 | 5:00 |
| Middleweight | Sean Strickland | def. | Bubba McDaniel | Submission (rear-naked choke) | 1 | 4:33 |
| Featherweight | Robert Whiteford | def. | Daniel Pineda | Decision (unanimous) (30–27, 29–28, 29–28) | 3 | 5:00 |

== Bonus awards ==
The following fighters received $50,000 bonuses:

- Fight of the Night: Johny Hendricks vs. Robbie Lawler
- Performance of the Night: Ovince St. Preux and Dennis Bermudez

== See also ==
- List of UFC events
- 2014 in UFC
