= Jimy Hettes =

American martial artist

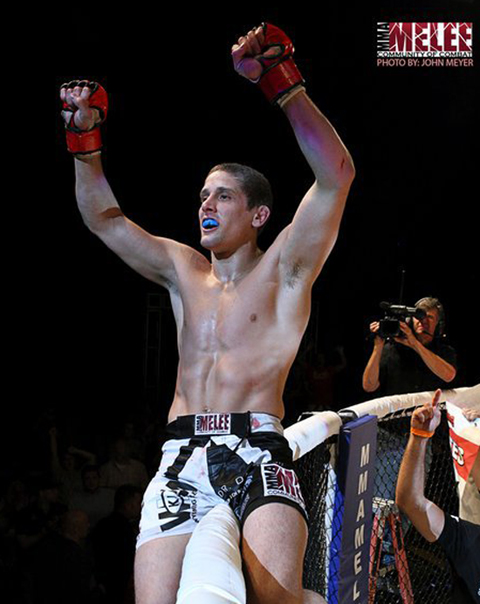
- Jimy Hettes at the Mohegan Sun Arena
- Born: James Michael Hettes; June 9, 1987 (age 39); Kingston, Pennsylvania
- Other names: The Kid
- Height: 5 ft 9 in (1.75 m)
- Weight: 145 lb (66 kg; 10.4 st)
- Division: Featherweight
- Reach: 71 in (180 cm)
- Stance: Southpaw
- Fighting out of: Swoyersville, Pennsylvania
- Team: Northeast Jiu Jitsu, World Class Boxing, AMA Fight Club
- Rank: Brown belt in Judo; Brown belt in Brazilian Jiu-Jitsu

Mixed martial arts record
- Total: 14
- Wins: 11
- By submission: 10
- By decision: 1
- Losses: 3
- By knockout: 2
- By decision: 1

Other information
- Website: http://www.jimhettes.com
- Mixed martial arts record from Sherdog

James Michael Hettes (born June 9, 1987) is a retired American mixed martial artist who competed as a featherweight in the Ultimate Fighting Championship.

== Background ==
Hettes is a 2-time Keystone State Games Judo Gold Medalist and earned the nickname "Judo Jim" at Greg Jackson's Camp in Albuquerque, NM. Hettes started boxing at age 14 and started training in Brazilian Jiu-Jitsu at the age of 16 and is currently the head instructor at Northeastern Ju-Jitsu in Swoyersville, Pennsylvania. Hettes attended Luzerne County Community College for Criminal Justice.

=== Ultimate Fighting Championship ===
Hettes was originally expected to make his UFC debut in December 2010 as part of The Ultimate Fighter: Team GSP vs. Team Koscheck Finale card; Hettes turned the offer down due to prior engagements with another promotion. On July 16, 2011, Hettes officially signed with the UFC after winning the MMA Melee - MASS Featherweight Championship Belt.

As a late replacement to an injured Leonard Garcia. Hettes made his promotional debut on August 14, 2011, against Alex Caceres on 10 days notice. He won via submission (rear naked choke) at 3:12 of round 2.

Hettes defeated Nam Phan on December 30, 2011, at UFC 141. Hettes used his superior judo to take Phan down repeatedly, and also utilized excellent control on the ground. He landed a great deal of unanswered ground and pound and threatened with submissions throughout, taking a dominant unanimous decision (30-25, 30-25, 30-26).

Hettes was expected to face Steven Siler on June 22, 2012, at UFC on FX 4. However, Hettes was forced out of the bout with an injury and replaced by promotional newcomer Joey Gambino.

Hettes faced Marcus Brimage on September 22, 2012, at UFC 152. He lost the fight via unanimous decision, his first professional loss.

Hettes was expected to face Steven Siler on April 27, 2013, at UFC 159. However, Hettes was forced to pull out of the bout with an injury and replaced by Kurt Holobaugh.

After 13 months away, Hettes returned to the UFC in October 2013. He was expected to face Mike Wilkinson on October 26, 2013, at UFC Fight Night 30. However, Wilkinson pulled out of the bout in the week leading up the bout and was replaced by newcomer Robert Whiteford. Hettes won the fight via submission in the second round.

Hettes next faced Dennis Bermudez on March 15, 2014, at UFC 171. He lost the bout via TKO due to strike in the third round.

Hettes was expected to face Diego Brandão on January 31, 2015, at UFC 183. However, the fight was canceled right before the event started, as Hettes passed out backstage. He was taken to a local hospital for precautionary reasons. Subsequently, the bout with Brandão was rescheduled for April 18, 2015, at UFC on Fox 15. During a back-and-forth first round, an elbow strike from Brandão opened up Hettes' cauliflower ear. The attending doctor stopped the fight between the first and second rounds, resulting in a TKO loss for Hettes.

Hettes was expected to face Charles Rosa on January 17, 2016, at UFC Fight Night 81, but pulled out of the fight due to injury.

== Championships and accomplishments ==
=== Mixed martial arts ===
- Ultimate Fighting Championship
  - UFC.com Awards
    - 2011: Ranked #4 Newcomer of the Year
- Martial Arts Super Sport
  - MASS Featherweight Championship (One time)
- Pennsylvania Cage Fight Series
  - Pennsylvania Cage Fight Series Featherweight Championship (One time)

== Mixed martial arts record ==
Professional record breakdown
14 matches	11 wins	3 losses
By knockout	0	2
By submission	10	0
By decision	1	1

Res.	Record	Opponent	Method	Event	Date	Round	Time	Location	Notes
Loss	11–3	Diego Brandão	TKO (doctor stoppage)	UFC on Fox: Machida vs. Rockhold	April 18, 2015	1	5:00	Newark, New Jersey, United States	
Loss	11–2	Dennis Bermudez	TKO (punches and knee)	UFC 171	March 15, 2014	3	2:57	Dallas, Texas, United States	
Win	11–1	Robert Whiteford	Technical Submission (triangle choke)	UFC Fight Night: Machida vs. Munoz	October 26, 2013	2	2:17	Manchester, England	
Loss	10–1	Marcus Brimage	Decision (unanimous)	UFC 152	September 22, 2012	3	5:00	Toronto, Ontario, Canada	
Win	10–0	Nam Phan	Decision (unanimous)	UFC 141	December 30, 2011	3	5:00	Las Vegas, Nevada, United States	
Win	9–0	Alex Caceres	Submission (rear-naked choke)	UFC Live: Hardy vs. Lytle	August 14, 2011	2	3:12	Milwaukee, Wisconsin, United States	
Win	8–0	Jacob Kirwan	Submission (triangle choke)	MASS: Inauguration	July 16, 2011	2	3:58	Wilkes-Barre, Pennsylvania, United States	Won the MASS Featherweight Championship
Win	7–0	George Sheppard	Submission (rear-naked choke)	Cage Fight 6	November 26, 2010	2	3:05	Scranton, Pennsylvania, United States	Catchweight (152 lbs) bout.
Win	6–0	Dwayne Shelton	Submission (guillotine choke)	Cage Fight 5	August 13, 2010	1	0:49	Scranton, Pennsylvania, United States	Won the Pennsylvania CFS Featherweight Championship
Win	5–0	James Jones	Submission (rear-naked choke)	Shogun Fights 2	March 27, 2010	1	0:28	Baltimore, Maryland, United States	
Win	4–0	Jay Haas	Submission (heel hook)	Cage Fight 2	November 27, 2009	1	0:47	Scranton, Pennsylvania, United States	
Win	3–0	Steven Baker	Submission (armbar)	Shogun Fights	October 24, 2009	1	1:25	Baltimore, Maryland, United States	
Win	2–0	Nick Gentile	Submission (triangle choke)	Premier Cage Fighting	August 28, 2009	1	3:11	Hamburg, Pennsylvania, United States	
Win	1–0	Bobby Gorham	Submission (rear-naked choke)	Cage Fight 1	June 12, 2009	1	1:51	Scranton, Pennsylvania, United States	

== See also ==
- List of current UFC fighters
- List of male mixed martial artists
