= Bryan Caraway =

American mixed martial artist

- Born: August 4, 1984 (age 42); Yakima, Washington, U.S.
- Other names: Kid Lightning
- Height: 5 ft 8 in (1.73 m)
- Weight: 135.5 lb (61.5 kg; 9.68 st)
- Division: Bantamweight; Featherweight
- Reach: 68 in (173 cm)
- Style: Wrestling, Boxing, BJJ
- Fighting out of: Las Vegas, Nevada, United States
- Team: Xtreme Couture
- Wrestling: NCAA Division II Wrestling
- Years active: 2004–present

Mixed martial arts record
- Total: 31
- Wins: 22
- By knockout: 2
- By submission: 17
- By decision: 3
- Losses: 9
- By knockout: 2
- By submission: 2
- By decision: 5

Other information
- Mixed martial arts record from Sherdog

Bryan Caraway (born August 4, 1984) is an American mixed martial artist currently competing in Battlefield Fighting Championship. A professional MMA competitor since 2005, Caraway has fought in the UFC, Strikeforce, EliteXC, and the WEC. He was a competitor on Spike TV's The Ultimate Fighter: Team Bisping vs. Team Miller.

== Background ==
Caraway's father is a two-time Purple Heart recipient and a Vietnam veteran. Caraway is from Goldendale, Washington, and attended North Idaho College for one year and then went to Central Washington University for three and half years, where he was on the wrestling team until the program was dropped in 2004. One of Caraway's teammates, a cousin of UFC veteran Dennis Hallman, introduced Caraway to the MMA veteran, who was also an accomplished fighter. Caraway began fighting in the spring of 2004 and then moved to train in his hometown of Yakima, WA.

== Mixed martial arts career ==
=== Early career ===
Caraway decided to go professional after compiling a 6–1 amateur record in his home state of Washington. His opponent for his debut would be fellow future UFC fighter, Ian Loveland. Caraway lost when the cage side doctor halted the bout because of a deep laceration on the face of Caraway. Caraway built his record to 4-1 with four straight wins, finishing all four opponents, one of which was soon-to-be Ultimate Fighter and WEC fighter, Noah Thomas.

Caraway took on yet another future UFC fighter in John Gunderson, losing via submission in round two. Caraway bounced back after his second loss, and went on to win six straight fights, again, finishing all of his opponents. Riding a six fight win streak, and boasting a 10–2 record earned Caraway a contract with Strikeforce. His Strikeforce debut came at Strikeforce: Melendez vs. Thomson where he defeated Alvin Cacdac. Caraway then fought for EliteXC, being defeated by their future champion, Wilson Reis. Caraway fought one more time for Strikeforce before signing with World Extreme Cagefighting in 2010.

Bryan Caraway is managed by Daniel A. Martinez of Di-Cypher & Associates.

=== World Extreme Cagefighting ===
Caraway was defeated via first round submission in his WEC debut against Mark Hominick on January 10, 2010, at WEC 46.

Caraway was expected to face Fredson Paixão on March 6, 2010, at WEC 47. However, an injury forced Caraway to withdraw and was replaced by Courtney Buck. Caraway instead fought Paixao on the WEC 50 card, and was defeated via split decision. Caraway was released from his contract after the back-to-back losses.

=== Post-WEC ===
Caraway defeated Marlin "Pit Bull" Weikel via rear naked choke on February 19, 2011, at CageSport MMA XIII.

=== The Ultimate Fighter ===
In 2011, Caraway had signed with the UFC to compete in The Ultimate Fighter: Team Bisping vs. Team Miller. In the first episode, Caraway fought Eric Marriott to gain entry into the Ultimate Fighter house. Caraway defeated Marriott via unanimous decision (20-18, 20-18, 20-18).

Caraway was picked as the second featherweight on Team Mayhem and the fourth overall. In the first preliminary bout of the season, Caraway was selected to fight Marcus Brimage. Caraway controlled Brimage on the ground throughout the first round, and in the second round won the fight via submission (rear-naked choke) to move onto the semi-finals. In the semi-finals, Caraway fought Diego Brandao, losing the fight via TKO (punches) in round one.

=== Ultimate Fighting Championship ===
Caraway made his UFC debut on December 3, 2011, at The Ultimate Fighter 14 Finale and fought against fellow Ultimate Fighter castmate, Dustin Neace. Caraway won the fight via submission (rear-naked choke) in the second round. A week before the fight Caraway was severely ill and almost had to pull out of the fight.

Caraway made his Bantamweight debut against Mitch Gagnon on July 21, 2012, at UFC 149. He won via rear naked choke submission in round three.

Caraway was expected to face Mike Easton on December 8, 2012, at UFC on Fox 5, replacing an injured T.J. Dillashaw. However, on November 21, Caraway pulled out of the bout and was replaced by Raphael Assunção.

Caraway faced Takeya Mizugaki on March 3, 2013, at UFC on Fuel TV 8. He lost the fight via split decision. Caraway faced Johnny Bedford on April 27, 2013, at UFC 159, replacing an injured Erik Pérez. He won the back-and-forth fight via submission in the third round. Caraway was awarded Submission of the Night honors after the original bonus winner, Pat Healy had the award rescinded after testing positive for marijuana.

Caraway was expected to face Lucas Martins on February 22, 2014, at UFC 170. However, Caraway pulled out of the bout citing an injury and was replaced by UFC newcomer Aljamain Sterling.

Caraway faced Erik Pérez on June 7, 2014, at UFC Fight Night 42. After controlling the majority of the bout with his wrestling and grappling, Caraway won the fight via rear-naked choke in round 2. There was some controversy after the fight however, as during round 1, Caraway could be seen illegally fish-hooking Perez without the referee noticing.

Caraway faced Raphael Assunção on October 4, 2014, at UFC Fight Night: MacDonald vs. Saffiedine He lost the fight via unanimous decision.

Caraway faced Eddie Wineland on July 25, 2015, at UFC on Fox 16. He won the fight by unanimous decision.

Caraway next faced Aljamain Sterling on May 29, 2016, at UFC Fight Night 88. He won the fight via split decision.

Caraway was expected to face Jimmie Rivera on January 15, 2017, at UFC Fight Night 103. However, Caraway pulled out of the bout on January 4 citing an undisclosed injury. He was replaced by Marlon Vera. Eventually, Rivera withdrew from the fight as he felt going from a top-5 ranked fighter to an unranked one wouldn't make sense at that moment.

Caraway was expected to face Luke Sanders on December 9, 2017, at UFC Fight Night 123. On November 20, Caraway pulled out of the fight with undisclosed reason.

Caraway faced Cody Stamann on March 3, 2018, at UFC 222. He lost the fight by split decision.

Caraway faced Pedro Munhoz on November 30, 2018, at The Ultimate Fighter 28 Finale. He lost the fight via technical knockout in round one.

=== Battlefield Fighting Championship ===
On May 25, 2019, news surfaced that Caraway had parted ways with the UFC and signed a contract with South Korean MMA promotion Battlefield Fighting Championship and made his promotional debut against Raja Shippen on July 27, 2019. Caraway won by unanimous decision.

== Championships and awards ==
- Ultimate Fighting Championship
  - Fight of the Night (One time)
  - Submission of the Night (One time)
  - UFC.com Awards
    - 2016: Ranked #8 Upset of the Year vs. Aljamain Sterling

== Personal life ==
Caraway, after a five-year relationship, became engaged to Abbey Garrabrandts in March 2021 in Mexico. They have a daughter born January 22, 2022. Caraway previously dated former UFC fighter Miesha Tate. They had been together since attending Central Washington University. In 2014, Tate was credited with saving the life of Caraway's mother, Chris Caraway, when the latter suffered an asthma attack while scuba diving.

Caraway is featured in the award-winning mixed martial arts documentary Fight Life. Released in 2013, the film is directed by indie filmmaker James Z. Feng and produced by RiLL Films.

== Legal issues ==
In February 2021, Caraway and Tate began a legal battle over assets acquired during their 10 year relationship, including a Polaris RZR ATV that he allegedly stole back from his ex-girlfriend, former UFC Women's Bantamweight Chamipion Miesha Tate, after she first stole the ATV from his residence. Caraway reached out to the criminal investigations unit after he was appeared in the “most wanted list” to schedule an arraignment hearing but he failed to appear at a pre-trial conference hearing in Washington state.

== Mixed martial arts record ==
Professional record breakdown
31 matches	22 wins	9 losses
By knockout	2	2
By submission	16	2
By decision	4	5

Res.	Record	Opponent	Method	Event	Date	Round	Time	Location	Notes
Win	22–9	Raja Shippen	Decision (unanimous)	Battlefield FC 2	July 27, 2019	3	5:00	Macau, China	
Loss	21–9	Pedro Munhoz	TKO (body kick and punches)	The Ultimate Fighter: Heavy Hitters Finale	November 30, 2018	1	2:39	Las Vegas, Nevada, United States	
Loss	21–8	Cody Stamann	Decision (split)	UFC 222	March 3, 2018	3	5:00	Las Vegas, Nevada, United States	
Win	21–7	Aljamain Sterling	Decision (split)	UFC Fight Night: Almeida vs. Garbrandt	May 29, 2016	3	5:00	Las Vegas, Nevada, United States	
Win	20–7	Eddie Wineland	Decision (unanimous)	UFC on Fox: Dillashaw vs. Barão 2	July 25, 2015	3	5:00	Chicago, Illinois, United States	
Loss	19–7	Raphael Assunção	Decision (unanimous)	UFC Fight Night: MacDonald vs. Saffiedine	October 4, 2014	3	5:00	Halifax, Nova Scotia, Canada	
Win	19–6	Erik Pérez	Submission (rear-naked choke)	UFC Fight Night: Henderson vs. Khabilov	June 7, 2014	2	1:52	Albuquerque, New Mexico, United States	
Win	18–6	Johnny Bedford	Submission (guillotine choke)	UFC 159	April 27, 2013	3	4:44	Newark, New Jersey, United States	Submission of the Night.
Loss	17–6	Takeya Mizugaki	Decision (split)	UFC on Fuel TV: Silva vs. Stann	March 3, 2013	3	5:00	Saitama, Japan	
Win	17–5	Mitch Gagnon	Submission (rear-naked choke)	UFC 149	July 21, 2012	3	1:39	Calgary, Alberta, Canada	Bantamweight debut. Fight of the Night.
Win	16–5	Dustin Neace	Submission (rear-naked choke)	The Ultimate Fighter: Team Bisping vs. Team Miller Finale	December 3, 2011	2	3:38	Las Vegas, Nevada, United States	
Win	15–5	Marlin Weikel	Submission (rear-naked choke)	CageSport 13	February 19, 2011	1	3:17	Tacoma, Washington, United States	
Loss	14–5	Fredson Paixão	Decision (split)	WEC 50	August 18, 2010	3	5:00	Las Vegas, Nevada, United States	
Loss	14–4	Mark Hominick	Submission (armbar)	WEC 46	January 10, 2010	1	3:48	Sacramento, California, United States	
Win	14–3	Eddie Pelczynski	Submission (triangle choke)	CageSport 7	October 3, 2009	1	3:55	Tacoma, Washington, United States	
Win	13–3	Alex Zuniga	Decision (unanimous)	Strikeforce Challengers: Villasenor vs. Cyborg	June 19, 2009	3	5:00	Kent, Washington, United States	
Win	12–3	Daniel Stenovich	Submission (triangle choke)	CageSport MMA	November 29, 2008	1	1:47	Tacoma, Washington, United States	
Loss	11–3	Wilson Reis	Decision (unanimous)	EliteXC: Unfinished Business	July 26, 2008	3	5:00	Stockton, California, United States	Catchweight (140 lbs) bout.
Win	11–2	Alvin Cacdac	Submission (rear-naked choke)	Strikeforce: Melendez vs. Thomson	June 27, 2008	1	1:39	San Jose, California, United States	Catchweight (140 lbs) bout.
Win	10–2	Steve Sharp	Submission (triangle choke)	International Fighting Championship: Caged Combat	April 26, 2008	2	2:35	Nampa, Idaho, United States	
Win	9–2	Dave Lehr Cochran	Submission (rear-naked choke)	Sport Fight 21: Seasons Beatings	December 22, 2007	2	4:15	Portland, Oregon, United States	
Win	8–2	Eddy Belen	TKO (punches)	SF: Clash at the Casino 2	June 30, 2007	1	1:29	Pendleton, Oregon, United States	
Win	7–2	Saul Mitchell	Submission (armbar)	MMAC: The Revolution	May 12, 2007	1	3:04	Washington, D.C., United States	
Win	6–2	Harris Norwood	Submission (rear-naked choke)	Lords of the Cage	February 24, 2007	2	4:00	Anacortes, Washington, United States	
Win	5–2	Andy Lukesh	Submission (rear-naked choke)	Sport Fight 18: Turning Point	January 6, 2007	2	4:30	Portland, Oregon, United States	
Loss	4–2	John Gunderson	Submission (armbar)	Desert Brawl: Oregon vs. Texas	September 23, 2006	2	4:10	Redmond, Oregon, United States	
Win	4–1	Trevor Harris	Submission (rear-naked choke)	Sport Fight 16: Clash at the Casino	June 24, 2006	1	1:43	Pendleton, Oregon, United States	
Win	3–1	Jason Chuckelnaskit	Submission (rear-naked choke)	AX Fighting Championships: Impact	May 27, 2006	2	n/a	Town and Country, Washington, United States	
Win	2–1	Noah Thomas	Submission (rear-naked choke)	Professional Fighting Association: Pride & Fury 4	March 23, 2006	1	3:31	Worley, Idaho, United States	
Win	1–1	Galen Bush	TKO (punches)	AX Fighting Championships: Assault at the Armory	March 18, 2006	n/a	n/a	Everett, Washington, United States	
Loss	0–1	Ian Loveland	TKO (doctor stoppage)	Sport Fight 12: Breakout	September 16, 2005	2	0:31	Portland, Oregon, United States	

=== Mixed martial arts exhibition record ===
Exhibition record breakdown		
3 matches	2 wins	1 loss
By knockout	0	1
By submission	1	0
By decision	1	0

Res.	Record	Opponent	Method	Event	Date	Round	Time	Location	Notes
Loss	2–1	Diego Brandão	KO (punches)	The Ultimate Fighter: Team Bisping vs. Team Miller	November 16, 2011 (airdate)	1	4:15	Las Vegas, Nevada, United States	Semi-finals.
Win	2–0	Marcus Brimage	Submission (rear-naked choke)	The Ultimate Fighter: Team Bisping vs. Team Miller	November 2, 2011 (airdate)	2	2:55	Las Vegas, Nevada, United States	Quarter-finals.
Win	1–0	Eric Marriott	Decision (unanimous)	The Ultimate Fighter: Team Bisping vs. Team Miller	September 21, 2011 (airdate)	1	5:00	Las Vegas, Nevada, United States	Preliminary bout.

== See also ==
- List of current UFC fighters
- List of male mixed martial artists
