= Murad Machaev =

Russian mixed martial arts fighter

Murad Machaev Мурад Мачаев
- Born: December 3, 1986 (age 39); Makhachkala, Russian SFSR, Soviet Union
- Other names: Strangler, Chokeman
- Nationality: Russian
- Height: 5 ft 9 in (1.75 m)
- Weight: 155 lb (70 kg; 11.1 st)
- Division: Lightweight
- Reach: 69 in (180 cm)
- Style: Combat Sambo
- Fighting out of: Makhachkala, Dagestan, Russia; Huntington Beach, California, U.S.
- Team: Fight Nights Team; Krepyost (Fortress Gym); Reign Training Center; HB Ultimate Training Center
- Rank: Master of Sports in Combat Sambo purple belt in Brazilian Jiu-Jitsu
- Years active: 2009—2018

Mixed martial arts record
- Total: 25
- Wins: 22
- By knockout: 5
- By submission: 10
- By decision: 7
- Losses: 3
- By knockout: 1
- By submission: 1
- By decision: 1

Other information
- Mixed martial arts record from Sherdog

Murad Machaev
Medal record

Representing Russia

Men's Combat Sambo

Russian Championships
Silver medal – second place	2012 Moscow	-68 kg
Bronze medal – third place	2010 Krasnokamsk	-68 kg
Bronze medal – third place	2008 Moscow	-68 kg

Murad Magomedkhanovich Machaev (Russian: Мурад Магомедханович Мачаев; born December 3, 1986) is a Russian former mixed martial artist, who competed in the lightweight division for the Absolute Championship Berkut (ACB), Eurasia Fight Nights Global and Bellator MMA veteran, he is the winner of the 2011 Fedor Emelianenko Cup.

== Background ==
Murad Machaev was born on December 3, 1986, in the former Soviet Union, Dagestan ASSR, Makhachkala in modern-day Dagestan, Russia. Before student life he began trained in Freestyle Wrestling but join to Sambo. He lost to Amirkhan Mazihov in 68 kg final match and became silver medal in Southern Federal District Combat Sambo Championships 2007 in Armavir, Krasnodar Krai, Russia.

== Mixed martial arts career ==
=== Bellator MMA ===
In August 2012, it was announced that Machaev had signed a contract with Bellator.

Machaev faced Marcin Held in the opening round of the Lightweight tournament on October 19, 2012, at Bellator 77. He lost via unanimous decision (29–28, 29–28, 29–28).

Machaev faced Lorawnt-T Nelson on November 16, 2012, at Bellator 81. He won the fight via unanimous decision (30–27, 30–27, 30–27).

=== Fight Nights MMA ===
Machaev faced Ivica Truscek on December 16, 2012, at Fight Nights Global 9. He won via submission in the first round.

Machaev faced Andrius Hobaldo on April 20, 2013, at Fight Nights Global 11. He won via KO in first round.

Machaev faced Alexei Angelovskiy on September 30, 2014, at Fight Nights Global: Battle of Moscow 17. He won via submission in the first round.

Machaev faced Niko Puhakka on December 20, 2014, at Fight Nights Global: Battle of Moscow 18. He won via TKO (punches) in the second round.

Machaev faced Dagestani Islam Begidov on March 21, 2015, at Fight Nights Global: Moscow Cup. He won via TKO (punches) in the second round.

Machaev faced Bellator Tournament runner-up Alexander Sarnavskiy on February 26, 2016, at Fight Nights Global 44. He won the fight via unanimous decision.

Machaev faced Jack McGann on September 25, 2016, at Fight Nights Global 51. He won the fight via submission in the second round.

Machaev lost to UFC veteran Diego Brandão via submission on 28 January 2017 at Fight Nights 58.

=== Absolute Championship Berkut ===
Machaev signed a six-fight deal with the ACB in December 2017. After two bouts in ACB he announced his retirement from MMA.

== Championships and accomplishments ==
=== Mixed martial arts ===
- World Absolute Fighting Championship
  - 2010 Volga Federal District Open Lightweight Tournament Winner
- Fight Nights
  - Battle of Moscow 1 Lightweight Tournament Winner

=== Sambo ===
- All-Russian Sambo Federation
  - Russian Combat Sambo National Championship Runner-up (2012)
  - Russian Combat Sambo National Championship 3rd Place (2010)
  - 2010 A.A. Kharlampiev Memorial Combat Sambo Silver Medalist
  - 2007 Southern Federal District Championships Combat Sambo Silver Medalist
- Combat Sambo Federation of Russia
  - Russian Combat Sambo National Championship 3rd Place (2008)
- World Combat Sambo Federation
  - European Combat Sambo Championships 2012 in Moscow, NC (headbutt and broken nose)

== Mixed martial arts record ==
Professional record breakdown
23 matches	20 wins	3 losses
By knockout	5	1
By submission	10	1
By decision	7	1

Res.	Record	Opponent	Method	Event	Date	Round	Time	Location	Notes
Loss	22–3	Marat Balaev	TKO (punches)	ACB 88	September 8, 2018	1	3:43	Krasnodar, Krasnodar Krai, Russia	
Win	22–2	Mukhamed Kokov	Decision (unanimous)	ACB 86	May 5, 2018	3	5:00	Moscow, Russia	
Win	21–2	Ary Santos	Submission (rear-naked choke)	Fight Nights Global 67: Brandão vs. Galiev	May 25, 2017	1	4:50	Yekaterinburg, Sverdlovsk oblast, Russia	
Loss	20–2	Diego Brandao	Submission (helicopter armbar)	Fight Nights Global 58: Brandão vs. Machaev	January 28, 2017	2	0:58	Makhachkala, Dagestan, Russia	
Win	20–1	Jack McGann	Submission (rear-naked choke)	Fight Nights Global 51: Pavlovich vs. Gelegaev	September 25, 2016	2	4:48	Makhachkala, Dagestan, Russia	
Win	19–1	Alexander Sarnavskiy	Decision (unanimous)	Fight Nights Global 44: Machaev vs. Sarnavskiy	February 26, 2016	3	5:00	Moscow, Moscow Oblast, Russia	
Win	18–1	Sergej Grecicho	Decision (unanimous)	Mix Fight Combat	December 26, 2015	3	5:00	Moscow, Moscow Oblast, Russia	
Win	17–1	Islam Begidov	TKO (punches)	Fight Nights: Moscow Cup	March 21, 2015	2	2:38	Moscow, Moscow Oblast, Russia	
Win	16–1	Niko Puhakka	TKO (punches)	Fight Nights: Battle of Moscow 18	December 20, 2014	2	4:30	Moscow, Moscow Oblast, Russia	
Win	15–1	Alexei Angelovskiy	Submission (armbar)	Fight Nights: Battle of Moscow 17	September 30, 2014	1	3:29	Moscow, Moscow Oblast, Russia	
Win	14–1	Alexey Polpudnikov	Decision (unanimous)	Khabarovsk Mayor's MMA Cup 2014	May 17, 2014	2	5:00	Khabarovsk, Khabarovsk Krai, Russia	
Win	13–1	Gokhan Turkyilmaz	Submission (rear-naked choke)	Dare Fight Sports: Rebels of MMA	October 12, 2013	1	N/A	Bangkok, Chao Phraya River, Thailand	
Win	12–1	Andrius Hobaldo	KO (punches)	Fight Nights 11	April 20, 2013	1	2:44	Moscow, Moscow Oblast, Russia	
Win	11–1	Ivica Truscek	Submission (D'arce choke)	Fight Nights: Battle of Moscow 9	December 16, 2012	1	2:14	Moscow, Moscow Oblast, Russia	
Win	10–1	Lorawnt-T Nelson	Decision (unanimous)	Bellator 81	November 16, 2012	3	5:00	Kingston, Rhode Island, United States	
Loss	9–1	Marcin Held	Decision (unanimous)	Bellator 77	October 19, 2012	3	5:00	Reading, Pennsylvania, United States	Bellator Season 7 Lightweight Tournament Quarterfinal.
Win	9–0	Cesario di Domenico	Decision (unanimous)	United Glory 15 - 2012 Glory World Series	March 23, 2012	3	5:00	Moscow, Moscow Oblast, Russia	
Win	8–0	Alymbek Nasipov	TKO (retirement)	Fights With Rules 3	November 25, 2011	1	5:00	Ufa, Republic of Bashkortostan, Russia	
Win	7–0	Vadim Ryazanov	Submission (armbar)	Draka - Governor's Cup 2010	December 18, 2010	2	0:57	Khabarovsk, Khabarovsk Krai, Russia	
Win	6–0	Alexandr Shmelev	Submission (rear-naked choke)	World Absolute FC	June 24, 2010	1	4:15	Cheboksary, Chuvash Republic, Russia	2010 Volga Federal District Open Lightweight Tournament Final.
Win	5–0	Magomedrasul Omarov	Submission (rear-naked choke)	World Absolute FC	June 24, 2010	1	3:37	Cheboksary, Chuvash Republic, Russia	2010 Volga Federal District Open Lightweight Tournament Semifinal.
Win	4–0	Zubaira Tukhugov	Submission (rear-naked choke)	Fight Nights: Battle of Moscow 1	June 5, 2010	1	1:17	Moscow, Moscow Oblast, Russia	Battle of Moscow 1 Lightweight Tournament Final.
Win	3–0	Serob Minasyan	Decision (unanimous)	Fight Nights: Battle of Moscow 1	June 5, 2010	2	5:00	Moscow, Moscow Oblast, Russia	Battle of Moscow 1 Lightweight Tournament Semifinal.
Win	2–0	Yuri Berzegov	TKO (punches)	Pancration SFD Championship 2	June 11, 2009	1	3:18	Cherkessk, Karachay-Cherkess Republic, Russia	
Win	1–0	Zaur Bostanov	Submission (rear-naked choke)	Pancration SFD Championship 1	April 10, 2009	1	4:25	Cherkessk, Karachay-Cherkess Republic, Russia	
