= UFC on Fuel TV: Mousasi vs. Latifi =

UFC mixed martial arts event in 2013

- The poster for UFC on Fuel TV: Mousasi vs. Latifi
- Promotion: Ultimate Fighting Championship
- Date: April 6, 2013
- Venue: Ericsson Globe Arena
- City: Stockholm, Sweden
- Attendance: 14,506
- Total gate: $2,710,530

Event chronology
UFC 158: St-Pierre vs. Diaz	UFC on Fuel TV: Mousasi vs. Latifi	The Ultimate Fighter: Team Jones vs. Team Sonnen Finale

UFC on Fuel TV: Mousasi vs. Latifi (also known as UFC on Fuel TV 9 or UFC Sweden 2) was a mixed martial arts event held on April 6, 2013, at the Ericsson Globe Arena in Stockholm, Sweden. The event was broadcast live on Fuel TV.

== Background ==
This event was the second event that the UFC has hosted in Sweden, following UFC on Fuel TV: Gustafsson vs. Silva which took place in 2012, and was the fastest selling European event in UFC history, selling out in just three hours, partly due to alleged involvement from ticket re-sellers.

The event was expected to be headlined by top light heavyweight contender Alexander Gustafsson and former Dream Middleweight and Light Heavyweight Champion and former Strikeforce Light Heavyweight Champion, and promotional newcomer Gegard Mousasi. However, on April 2 it was announced by the Swedish MMA Federation, that Gustafsson would not be cleared to participate at the event due to a cut he received during a sparring session on March 30. Gustafsson was replaced by UFC newcomer Ilir Latifi, one of his main training partners. The main event was also contested at three rounds, instead of the organization's customary five.

A bout between Robbie Peralta and Akira Corassani, previously linked to UFC 156, was moved to this event after an illness sidelined Corassani for a short period of time.

This card featured the UFC debut of Conor McGregor.

== Results ==
Main card (Fuel TV)
Weight class				Method	Round	Time	Notes
Light Heavyweight	Gegard Mousasi	def.	Ilir Latifi	Decision (unanimous) (30–27, 30–27, 30–27)	3	5:00
Lightweight	Ross Pearson	def.	Ryan Couture	TKO (punches)	2	3:45
Heavyweight	Matt Mitrione	def.	Phil De Fries	KO (punches)	1	0:19
Bantamweight	Brad Pickett	def.	Mike Easton	Decision (split) (28–29, 30–27, 30–27)	3	5:00
Featherweight	Diego Brandão	def.	Pablo Garza	Submission (arm-triangle choke)	1	3:27
Featherweight	Akira Corassani	def.	Robbie Peralta	Decision (unanimous) (30–27, 30–27, 29–28)	3	5:00
Preliminary card (Facebook)
Lightweight	Reza Madadi	def.	Michael Johnson	Submission (D'Arce choke)	3	1:33	(Note: This bout aired on the broadcast following the Mitrione vs De Fries bout.)
Middleweight	Tor Troéng	def.	Adam Cella	Submission (rear-naked choke)	1	3:11
Welterweight	Adlan Amagov	def.	Chris Spång	Decision (unanimous) (30–27, 30–27, 30–27)	3	5:00
Featherweight	Conor McGregor	def.	Marcus Brimage	TKO (punches)	1	1:07	(Note: This bout aired on the broadcast following the Brandão vs Garza bout.)
Welterweight	Ryan LaFlare	def.	Ben Alloway	Decision (unanimous) (30–27, 30–27, 30–27)	3	5:00
Middleweight	Tom Lawlor	def.	Michael Kuiper	Submission (guillotine choke)	2	1:05
Welterweight	Papy Abedi	def.	Besam Yousef	Decision (split) (28–29, 29–28, 29–28)	3	5:00

== Bonus awards ==
Fighters were awarded $60,000 bonuses.

- Fight of the Night: Brad Pickett vs. Mike Easton
- Knockout of the Night: Conor McGregor
- Submission of the Night: Reza Madadi

== See also ==
- List of UFC events
- 2013 in UFC
