= UFC 141 =

UFC mixed martial arts event in 2011

UFC 141: Lesnar vs. Overeem
- The poster for UFC 141: Lesnar vs. Overeem
- Promotion: Ultimate Fighting Championship
- Date: December 30, 2011
- Venue: MGM Grand Garden Arena
- City: Las Vegas, Nevada
- Attendance: 13,793
- Total gate: $3,100,000
- Buyrate: 750,000

Event chronology
UFC 140: Jones vs. Machida	UFC 141: Lesnar vs. Overeem	UFC 142: Aldo vs. Mendes

UFC 141: Lesnar vs. Overeem was a mixed martial arts pay-per-view event held by the Ultimate Fighting Championship on Friday, December 30, 2011, at the MGM Grand Garden Arena in Las Vegas, Nevada.

== Background ==
The UFC returned to a 10 p.m. ET start with this event.

UFC 141 was the last event to feature preliminary fights live on Spike TV.

This event marked Brock Lesnar's return to MMA action after being out for over a year due to diverticulitis. The lead up to the fight was rife with controversy regarding his opponent, Alistair Overeem. In November 2011, both competitors were required by the NSAC to comply with out-of-competition drug testing. Lesnar delivered his sample screen on November 21, while Overeem delivered his on November 23. The screen, however, did not meet the standards of the commission. Overeem submitted a second test through his personal physician – which was also deemed unacceptable – before flying out of the country. Overeem was ultimately given a conditional license for the fight by the committee during a meeting held on December 12, 2011.

The winner of the main event was expected to face Junior dos Santos in a bout for the UFC Heavyweight Championship. After being defeated by Overeem, Lesnar announced his immediate retirement from the UFC.

T. J. Grant was originally scheduled to face Jacob Volkmann at this event but was forced to pull out due to an undisclosed injury, and was replaced by returning veteran Efraín Escudero.

Matthew Riddle was scheduled to face Luis Ramos, but the bout was cancelled only moments before the fight due to Riddle being ill.

Ramsey Nijem was scheduled to face Anthony Njokuani at the event but was forced to pull out due to an undisclosed injury, and replaced by Danny Castillo.

== Results ==
Main card
Weight class				Method	Round	Time	Notes
Heavyweight	Alistair Overeem	def.	Brock Lesnar	TKO (body kick and punches)	1	2:26
Lightweight	Nate Diaz	def.	Donald Cerrone	Decision (unanimous) (30–27, 30–27, 29–28)	3	5:00
Welterweight	Johny Hendricks	def.	Jon Fitch	KO (punch)	1	0:12
Light Heavyweight	Alexander Gustafsson	def.	Vladimir Matyushenko	TKO (punches)	1	2:13
Featherweight	Jimy Hettes	def.	Nam Phan	Decision (unanimous) (30-25, 30-25, 30-26)	3	5:00
Preliminary card (Spike TV)
Featherweight	Ross Pearson	def.	Junior Assunção	Decision (unanimous) (29–28, 29–28, 30–27)	3	5:00
Lightweight	Danny Castillo	def.	Anthony Njokuani	Decision (split) (29–28, 28–29, 29–28)	3	5:00
Preliminary card (Facebook)
Welterweight	Dong Hyun Kim	def.	Sean Pierson	Decision (unanimous) (30–27, 30–27, 30–27)	3	5:00	(Note: This bout aired on the broadcast following the Hendricks vs Fitch bout.)
Lightweight	Jacob Volkmann	def.	Efraín Escudero	Decision (unanimous) (29–28, 29–28, 29–28)	3	5:00
Featherweight	Diego Nunes	def.	Manny Gamburyan	Decision (unanimous) (29–28, 29–28, 29–28)	3	5:00	(Note: This bout aired on the broadcast following the Overeem vs Lesnar bout.)

== Bonus awards ==
The following fighters received $75,000 bonuses.

- Fight of the Night: Nate Diaz vs. Donald Cerrone
- Knockout of the Night: Johny Hendricks
- Submission of the Night: Not awarded as no matches ended by submission.

== Reported payout ==
The following is the reported payout to the fighters as reported to the Nevada State Athletic Commission. It does not include sponsor money and also does not include the UFC's traditional "fight night" bonuses.

- Alistair Overeem: $380,000 (includes $190,000 win bonus) def. Brock Lesnar: $400,000
- Nate Diaz: $74,000 (includes $37,000 win bonus) def. Donald Cerrone: $30,000
- Johny Hendricks: $52,000 (includes $26,000 win bonus) def. Jon Fitch: $60,000
- Alexander Gustafsson: $32,000 (includes $16,000 win bonus) def. Vladimir Matyushenko: $40,000
- Jim Hettes: $16,000 (includes $8,000 win bonus) def. Nam Phan: $8,000
- Ross Pearson: $40,000 (includes $20,000 win bonus) def. Junior Assuncao: $8,000
- Danny Castillo: $38,000 (includes $19,000 win bonus) def. Anthony Njokuani: $12,000
- Dong Hyun Kim: $82,000 (includes $41,000 win bonus) def. Sean Pierson: $8,000
- Jacob Volkmann: $32,000 (includes $16,000 win bonus) def. Efrain Escudero: $10,000
- Diego Nunes: $24,000 (includes $12,000 win bonus) def. Manny Gamburyan: $18,000
