= Marcus Brimage =

American mixed martial arts fighter

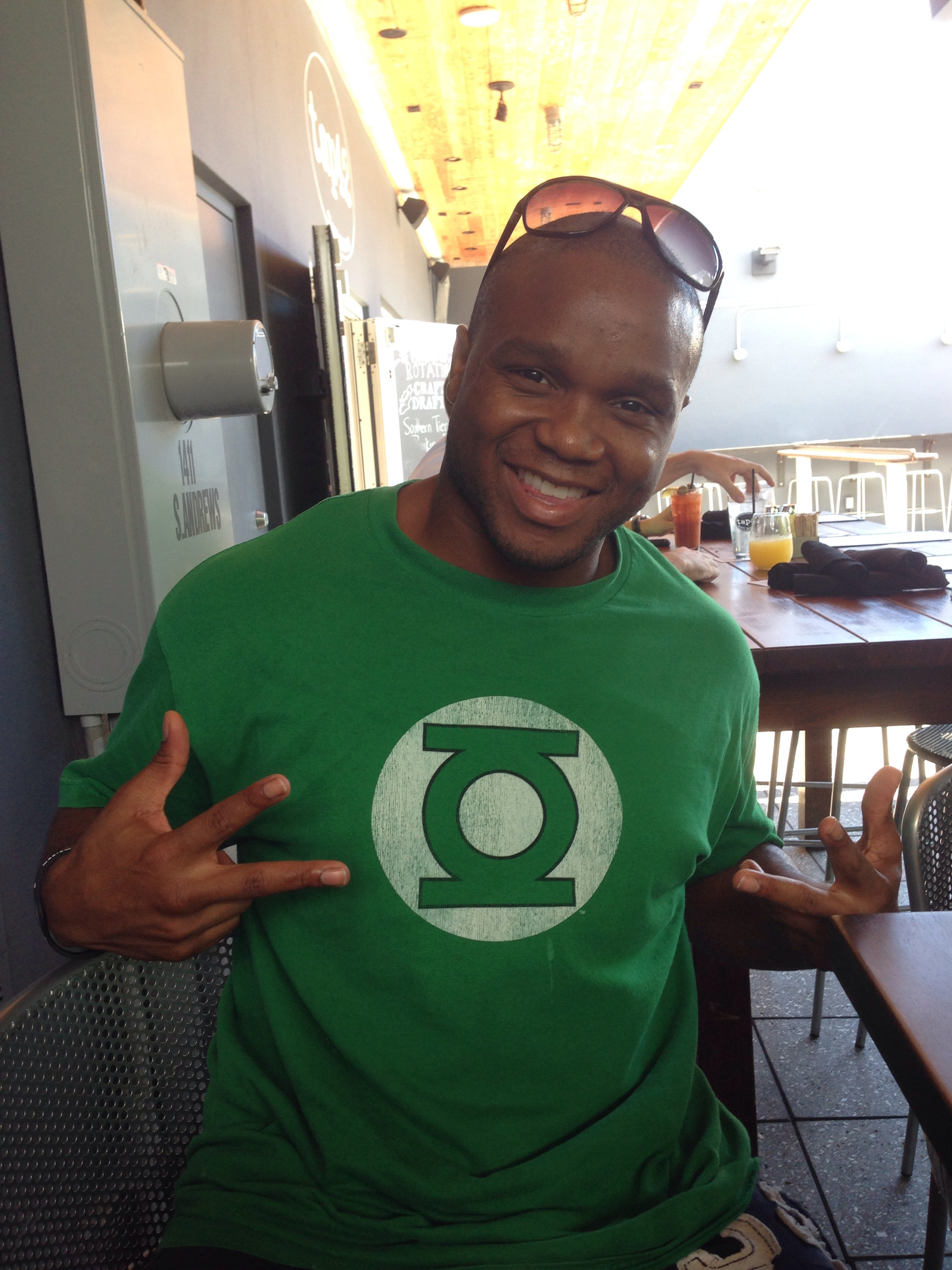
- Born: Marcus Clyde Brimage; April 6, 1985 (age 41); Colorado Springs, Colorado
- Other names: The Bama Beast
- Height: 5 ft 4 in (1.63 m)
- Weight: 135 lb (61 kg; 9.6 st)
- Division: Lightweight; Featherweight; Bantamweight
- Reach: 71 in (180 cm)
- Stance: Southpaw
- Fighting out of: Coconut Creek, Florida, Birmingham, Alabama
- Team: American Top Team; Spartan Fitness
- Years active: 2007–2023

Mixed martial arts record
- Total: 15
- Wins: 7
- By knockout: 3
- By decision: 4
- Losses: 8
- By knockout: 3
- By submission: 1
- By decision: 4

Other information
- Mixed martial arts record from Sherdog

Marcus Clyde Brimage (born April 6, 1985) is a retired American mixed martial artist who competed in the Featherweight division. A professional competitor since 2007, he has formerly competed for the UFC and was a competitor on The Ultimate Fighter: Team Bisping vs. Team Miller. He is perhaps best known for his fight against Conor McGregor, who was making his UFC debut.

== Background ==
Brimage interest in martial arts began after seeing an episode of Dragon Ball Z, and watching a highlight reel of Quinton Jackson during high school. Brimage played football throughout his youth into high school, first at John Carroll Catholic High and then at Pinson Valley High School. After graduating high school, Brimage attended Wallace State Community College before graduating from Faulkner University with a bachelor's in criminal justice.

== Mixed martial arts career ==
=== Early career ===
Brimage continued to work out, but was still looking to keep his competitive spirit alive. Brimage began training at a local Muay Thai gym by recommendation from one of his staff sergeants in the military. There Brimage met Chris Connelly, with whom he later opened up a gym, Spartan Fitness, in 2006. Shortly after Brimage began fighting as an amateur, collecting a 10–0 record before turning professional in 2007.

=== Professional career ===
In March 2007 Brimage made his professional debut for Georgia Fighting Championships. Brimage fought and defeated Jason Kwast via unanimous decision. Ten months later Brimage returned to competition against future Bellator fighter Bryan Goldsby. Brimage defeated Goldsby via TKO in the second round of the fight.

A month after his second professional fight Brimage was selected for BET's reality television show Iron Ring. Brimage lost his only fight for the promotion against Joey Camacho via submission. Due to injuries Brimage was forced into a more than two-year hiatus from MMA. Brimage again returned to MMA against former UFC veteran Kyle Bradley, defeating him via first-round TKO.

Before going to appear on The Ultimate Fighter 14 Brimage moved to Coconut Creek, Florida, to train full-time with the American Top Team.

=== The Ultimate Fighter ===
Brimage was selected to appear on both The Ultimate Fighter 8 and The Ultimate Fighter: United States vs. United Kingdom but due to injuries was never allowed to get onto the show. In 2011, Brimage dropped to the featherweight division, and signed with the UFC to compete on The Ultimate Fighter: Team Bisping vs. Team Miller. In the first episode, Brimage fought Bryson Wailehua-Hansen; winning via TKO in the second round. The win gained Brimage entry into the Ultimate Fighter house. He was selected as a part of Team Bisping.

Brimage next fought against former WEC fighter Bryan Caraway. Brimage lost the fight in the second round via submission (rear-naked choke).

=== Ultimate Fighting Championship ===
Brimage officially made his UFC and featherweight debut on December 3, 2011, at The Ultimate Fighter 14 Finale against Ultimate Fighter castmate Stephen Bass. Brimage won the fight via unanimous decision (30–27, 30–27, 29–28).

Brimage then faced Strikeforce import Maximo Blanco, on April 21, 2012, at UFC 145. After three close, methodical rounds, Brimage won the fight via split decision.

Brimage fought undefeated featherweight prospect Jimy Hettes on September 22, 2012, at UFC 152. Brimage defeated Hettes via unanimous decision, giving Hettes his first professional loss.

Brimage faced UFC newcomer Conor McGregor on April 6, 2013, at UFC on Fuel TV 9. He lost the fight in just over a minute of the first round by TKO.

After a year off due to injuries, Brimage returned to face Russell Doane in a bantamweight bout on July 5, 2014, at UFC 175. He lost the fight by split decision.

Brimage was expected to face Erik Pérez on November 15, 2014, at UFC 180. However, Pérez pulled out of the bout in mid-October citing a shoulder injury.

Brimage was quickly rescheduled to fight Jumabieke Tuerxun on November 8, 2014, at UFC Fight Night 55. He was victorious in the first round after knocking out Tuerxun with a head kick and follow-up punches.

Brimage faced promotional newcomer Cody Garbrandt on January 3, 2015, at UFC 182. He lost the fight via TKO in the third round.

Brimage was expected to face Ian Entwistle on July 18, 2015, at UFC Fight Night 72. However, Entwistle pulled out of the fight in late June for undisclosed reasons and was replaced by Jimmie Rivera. He lost the fight via KO in the first round. Subsequently, Brimage was released from the promotion.

=== Post-UFC career ===
Brimage dropped his third loss in a row when he took on bantamweight prospect Soo Chul Kim at Road FC 29 on March 12, 2016. He lost the fight via unanimous decision.

Brimage faced Leonardo Morales at MMA War 1 on June 25, 2016. He lost the fight via unanimous decision.

Over five years removed from his previous bout, Brimage, replacing injured Derek Campos, faced Kyle Bochniak at XMMA 2 on July 30, 2021. He lost the bout via unanimous decision.

On January 25, 2023, Brimage announced his retirement from MMA.

== Mixed martial arts record ==
Professional record breakdown
15 matches	7 wins	8 losses
By knockout	3	3
By submission	0	1
By decision	4	4

Res.	Record	Opponent	Method	Event	Date	Round	Time	Location	Notes
Loss	7–8	Kyle Bochniak	Decision (unanimous)	XMMA 2: Saunders vs. Nijem	July 30, 2021	3	5:00	Greenville, South Carolina, United States	
Loss	7–7	Leonardo Morales	Decision (unanimous)	Viva Nicaragua Canal 13: MMA War	June 25, 2016	3	5:00	Managua, Nicaragua	Return to Featherweight.
Loss	7–6	Soo Chul Kim	Decision (unanimous)	Road FC 029	March 12, 2016	3	5:00	Wonju, South Korea	
Loss	7–5	Jimmie Rivera	KO (punches)	UFC Fight Night: Bisping vs. Leites	July 18, 2015	1	1:29	Glasgow, Scotland	
Loss	7–4	Cody Garbrandt	TKO (punches)	UFC 182	January 3, 2015	3	4:50	Las Vegas, Nevada, United States	
Win	7–3	Jumabieke Tuerxun	KO (head kick)	UFC Fight Night: Rockhold vs. Bisping	November 8, 2014	1	2:58	Sydney, Australia	
Loss	6–3	Russell Doane	Decision (split)	UFC 175	July 5, 2014	3	5:00	Las Vegas, Nevada, United States	Bantamweight debut.
Loss	6–2	Conor McGregor	TKO (punches)	UFC on Fuel TV: Mousasi vs. Latifi	April 6, 2013	1	1:07	Stockholm, Sweden	
Win	6–1	Jimy Hettes	Decision (unanimous)	UFC 152	September 22, 2012	3	5:00	Toronto, Ontario, Canada	
Win	5–1	Maximo Blanco	Decision (split)	UFC 145	April 21, 2012	3	5:00	Atlanta, Georgia, United States	
Win	4–1	Stephen Bass	Decision (unanimous)	The Ultimate Fighter 14 Finale	December 3, 2011	3	5:00	Las Vegas, Nevada, United States	Featherweight debut.
Win	3–1	Kyle Bradley	TKO (punches)	USA MMA 13	July 31, 2010	1	3:01	Baton Rouge, Louisiana, United States	
Loss	2–1	Joey Camacho	Submission (choke)	Iron Ring	February 18, 2008	1	1:27	New Orleans, Louisiana, United States	
Win	2–0	Bryan Goldsby	TKO (punches)	Xtreme Freestyle Fighting 7	January 19, 2008	2	1:07	Birmingham, Alabama, United States	
Win	1–0	Jason Kwast	Decision (unanimous)	Georgia FC 2	March 17, 2007	3	5:00	Georgia, United States	

== Bare knuckle record ==
Professional record breakdown
2 matches	0 wins	1 loss
By knockout	0	1
Draws	1	

Res.	Record	Opponent	Method	Event	Date	Round	Time	Location	Notes
Loss	0–1–1	Trevor Loken	TKO (punches)	BKFC 35	January 27, 2023	1	0:40	Myrtle Beach, South Carolina, United States	
Draw	0–0–1	Will Shutt	Draw (split)	BKFC 22	November 12, 2021	5	2:00	Miami, Florida, United States	

== See also ==
- List of male mixed martial artists
