= Andy Ogle =

English mixed martial arts fighter

- Born: Andrew Richard Ogle; 16 February 1989 (age 37); Newcastle upon Tyne, England, United Kingdom
- Other names: The Little Axe
- Nationality: English
- Height: 5 ft 9 in (1.75 m)
- Weight: 145 lb (66 kg; 10.4 st)
- Division: Featherweight; Lightweight
- Reach: 69.0 in (175 cm)
- Fighting out of: Sunderland, England, United Kingdom
- Team: Section 18 MMA
- Years active: 2009–2016

Mixed martial arts record
- Total: 15
- Wins: 9
- By knockout: 2
- By submission: 3
- By decision: 4
- Losses: 6
- By knockout: 1
- By submission: 2
- By decision: 3

Other information
- Mixed martial arts record from Sherdog

Andrew Richard Ogle (born 16 February 1989) is a retired English mixed martial artist, who formerly competed in the featherweight division of the Ultimate Fighting Championship. A professional MMA competitor since 2009, Ogle has made a name for himself fighting for numerous promotions all over England. He was a competitor on FX's The Ultimate Fighter: Live.

== Background ==
Ogle was born in Newcastle upon Tyne to Jan and Gordon Ogle. He was raised in Tynemouth, North Tyneside, and attended Marden High School where he competed in football and also trained mixed martial arts. At the age of 16, Ogle worked as an instructor for his gym, teaching the younger children MMA. Upon leaving Marden, Ogle enrolled at the University of Sunderland. Ogle graduated from Sunderland in 2011 with a degree in sports science.

== Mixed martial arts career ==
=== Early career ===
In 2008 Ogle began his semi-professional (amateur) career, posting five straight wins before taking a TKO loss in his final semi-pro fight, to Danny Jones After boasting a 5-1 semi-pro record, Ogle turned professional in late 2009. His pro debut came on 18 October 2009 against Graham Armstrong, another fighter making his pro debut. Ogle dominated the fight for three rounds, and was awarded the unanimous decision victory. Only a month later, in his second fight, Ogle lost to Bobby McVittie via submission after getting caught in a triangle choke in the first round. Ogle bounced back from the loss with three straight submission wins, all coming via rear-naked choke, and two of the submission wins coming in the first round.

Ogle dominated three more opponents, earning a record of 7-1 before being offered a fight with Shay Walsh, an undefeated fighter at the time considered the top featherweight prospect in the UK. Ogle upset Walsh, winning the fight via unanimous decision.

=== The Ultimate Fighter ===
In February 2012, it was revealed that Ogle was selected to be a participant on The Ultimate Fighter: Live. Ogle defeated Brendan Weafer via unanimous decision to move into the Ultimate Fighter house, and become an official cast member.

Ogle was selected seventh (fourteenth overall) by Urijah Faber to become a part of Team Faber. In the last quarter-final fight of the season, Ogle was selected to fight one of Team Cruz's best fighters in Mike Rio. Ogle earned the upset victory after submitting Rio with a rear-naked choke in the second round.

In the semi-final round Ogle was chosen to fight Team Faber teammate, Al Iaquinta. Ogle lost the fight via TKO in the closing moments of the first round, eliminating him from the competition.

=== Ultimate Fighting Championship ===
Despite not winning the show, UFC President Dana White decided to sign all sixteen cast members to exclusive UFC contracts. Ogle was linked to a bout at The Ultimate Fighter 15 Finale on 1 June 2012. However, due to being medically suspended after his KO loss to Al Iaquinta in quarter-finals of the show, Ogle was not able to compete on the card.

Ogle lost in his UFC debut to Akira Corassani via split decision on 29 September 2012 at UFC on Fuel TV 5. There was a lot of displeasure with the decision as many spectators and MMA website columnists believed Ogle had won the fight.

Ogle would then fought former featherweight title contender, Josh Grispi, on 16 February 2013 at UFC on Fuel TV: Barão vs. McDonald. After three rounds, Ogle won the fight via unanimous decision.

Ogle was expected to face Conor McGregor on 17 August 2013 at UFC Fight Night 26 However, Ogle pulled out of the bout due an injury and was replaced by Max Holloway

Ogle faced Cole Miller on 26 October 2013 at UFC Fight Night 30. He lost the fight via unanimous decision.

Ogle faced Charles Oliveira on 15 February 2014 at UFC Fight Night 36. He lost the fight via triangle choke submission in the third round.

Ogle faced Maximo Blanco on 31 May 2014 at UFC Fight Night 41. He lost the fight by unanimous decision.

Ogle next faced UFC newcomer Makwan Amirkhani on 24 January 2015 at UFC on Fox 14. He lost the fight via TKO only 8 seconds into the first round, and was subsequently released from the promotion shortly after the fight.

== Mixed martial arts record ==
Professional record breakdown
15 matches	9 wins	6 losses
By knockout	2	1
By submission	3	2
By decision	4	3

Res.	Record	Opponent	Method	Event	Date	Round	Time	Location	Notes
Loss	9–6	Makwan Amirkhani	TKO (flying knee and punches)	UFC on Fox: Gustafsson vs. Johnson	24 January 2015	1	0:08	Stockholm, Sweden	
Loss	9–5	Maximo Blanco	Decision (unanimous)	UFC Fight Night: Munoz vs. Mousasi	31 May 2014	3	5:00	Berlin, Germany	
Loss	9–4	Charles Oliveira	Submission (triangle choke)	UFC Fight Night: Machida vs. Mousasi	15 February 2014	3	2:40	Jaraguá do Sul, Brazil	
Loss	9–3	Cole Miller	Decision (unanimous)	UFC Fight Night: Machida vs. Munoz	26 October 2013	3	5:00	Manchester, England	
Win	9–2	Josh Grispi	Decision (unanimous)	UFC on Fuel TV: Barão vs. McDonald	16 February 2013	3	5:00	London, England	
Loss	8–2	Akira Corassani	Decision (split)	UFC on Fuel TV: Struve vs. Miocic	29 September 2012	3	5:00	Nottingham, England	Featherweight debut.
Win	8–1	Shay Walsh	Decision (unanimous)	Olympian MMA 12	12 November 2011	3	5:00	Liverpool, England	
Win	7–1	Antanas Jazbutis	TKO (punches)	Supremacy Fight Challenge 3	27 August 2011	3	3:08	Gateshead, England	
Win	6–1	Stewart Gillham	TKO (punches)	Supremacy Fight Challenge 2	29 May 2011	2	2:29	Gateshead, England	
Win	5–1	Jay Furness	Decision (unanimous)	Supremacy Fight Challenge 1	27 February 2011	3	5:00	Gateshead, England	
Win	4–1	Phil Flynn	Submission (rear-naked choke)	Knuckle Up MMA 8	4 September 2010	2	1:54	Bolton, England	
Win	3–1	Matt Eynon	Submission (rear-naked choke)	Strike and Submit 15	15 August 2010	1	N/A	Gateshead, England	
Win	2–1	Nigel Wright	Submission (rear-naked choke)	Strike and Submit 14	30 May 2010	1	1:31	Gateshead, England	
Loss	1–1	Bobby McVittie	Submission (triangle choke)	Absolute Combat 2	28 November 2009	1	1:33	Edinburgh, Scotland	
Win	1–0	Graham Armstrong	Decision (unanimous)	Cage Kombat 11	18 October 2009	3	5:00	Edinburgh, Scotland	

== Personal life ==
As of 2016, Ogle works as a prison guard in Newcastle, England.

== See also ==
- List of male mixed martial artists
