= Dustin Poirier =

American mixed martial artist (born 1989)

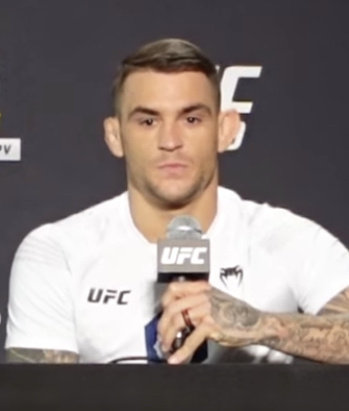
- Poirier in 2021
- Born: Dustin Glenn Poirier; January 19, 1989 (age 37); Lafayette, Louisiana, U.S.
- Nickname: The Diamond
- Height: 5 ft 9 in (1.75 m)
- Weight: 155 lb (70 kg; 11 st 1 lb)
- Division: Featherweight (2011–2014); Lightweight (2009–2010, 2015–2025)
- Reach: 72 in (183 cm)
- Fighting out of: Coconut Creek, Florida, U.S.
- Team: Gladiators Academy (until 2012); American Top Team (2012–2025)
- Rank: Black belt in Brazilian Jiu-Jitsu under Tim Credeur
- Years active: 2009–2025

Mixed martial arts record
- Total: 41
- Wins: 30
- By knockout: 15
- By submission: 8
- By decision: 7
- Losses: 10
- By knockout: 3
- By submission: 4
- By decision: 3
- No contests: 1

Amateur record
- Total: 7
- Wins: 7
- By knockout: 5
- By submission: 1
- By decision: 1

Other information
- Spouse: Jolie LeBlanc (m. 2009)
- Children: 2
- Mixed martial arts record from Sherdog

Dustin Glenn Poirier (born January 19, 1989) is an American former professional mixed martial artist who competed from 2009 to 2025. He formerly competed in the Featherweight and Lightweight divisions of the Ultimate Fighting Championship (UFC), where he was an interim UFC Lightweight Champion. Poirier also challenged three times for the undisputed UFC Lightweight Championship and twice for the BMF title. Poirier is frequently cited by MMA media and fellow fighters as one of the greatest lightweights in the sport's history, as well as one of the greatest fighters never to have won an undisputed belt.

Poirier is tied with Edson Barboza for the second most Fight of the Night awards in UFC history, with 10. He has landed 1,861 career significant strikes, the fifth most in UFC history, including 1,308 in the lightweight division, which ranks second in divisional history. His 11 career knockout victories are tied for the fifth most in UFC history, with nine of those coming at lightweight, also the second most in the division. Fight Matrix currently ranks him as the fifth-greatest lightweight fighter of all time and the 26th-greatest fighter pound for pound.

Poirier's rematch and trilogy bouts against Conor McGregor rank among the highest-selling pay-per-view events in UFC history. UFC 257 generated approximately 1.6 million buys, while UFC 264 drew around 1.8 million. He reportedly earned $1 million for UFC 257 and $10 million for UFC 264, the latter marking the largest payday of his career.

== Early life and education ==
Poirier was born in Lafayette, Louisiana, and is of Cajun heritage. His parents split up when he was around five years old. He attended Northside High School for a short time, but he dropped out in the ninth grade because of repeatedly getting into trouble and street fights.

== Mixed martial arts career ==
=== Early career ===
Poirier turned professional in 2009, quickly compiling a record of 7–0, competing mostly in regional promotions across his native Louisiana and the Southern United States. Glimpses of Poirier's early MMA career in Louisiana are depicted in the documentary Fightville.

=== World Extreme Cagefighting ===
In his WEC debut on August 18, 2010, at WEC 50, Poirier lost a unanimous decision to Danny Castillo.

Poirier defeated Zach Micklewright via first-round TKO on November 11, 2010, at WEC 52.

=== Ultimate Fighting Championship ===
==== 2010 ====
In October 2010, World Extreme Cagefighting merged with the Ultimate Fighting Championship. As part of the merger, all WEC fighters were transferred to the UFC.

After the UFC/WEC merger, newly crowned UFC Featherweight Champion José Aldo was set to make his first defense against No. 1 contender Josh Grispi at UFC 125. Aldo then had to withdraw from the bout due to a back injury on November 23, 2010. Poirier agreed to step in and face Grispi at the event on January 1, 2011. Poirier won the fight by unanimous decision.

==== 2011 ====
Poirier was expected to face Rani Yahya on June 11, 2011, at UFC 131. However, Yahya was forced from the bout with an injury, and he was replaced by promotional newcomer, Jason Young. Poirier defeated Young via unanimous decision after three rounds.

Poirier faced Pablo Garza on November 12, 2011, at UFC on Fox 1. Poirier defeated Garza via second round D'Arce choke.

==== 2012 ====
Poirier was expected to face Erik Koch on February 4, 2012, at UFC 143. However, Koch pulled out of the bout, citing an injury, and he was replaced by Ricardo Lamas. Then, just two weeks later, Lamas had to withdraw from the fight with an injury, leaving Poirier again without an opponent. A week later, Max Holloway agreed to step in to fight Poirier. Poirier defeated Holloway in the first round, with a mounted triangle armbar, earning a Submission of the Night bonus.

Poirier faced Chan Sung Jung on May 15, 2012, in the main event at UFC on Fuel TV: Korean Zombie vs. Poirier. This was the first time Poirier has been put on the main event. Jung defeated Poirier via submission (D'arce Choke) in the fourth round. The performance earned both participants Fight of the Night honors. The bout was honored as Fight of the Year by several publications at the conclusion of 2012.

Poirier defeated Jonathan Brookins on December 15, 2012, at The Ultimate Fighter 16 Finale via D'arce Choke.

==== 2013 ====
Poirier quickly returned to action, taking his second fight within 63 days as he stepped in as a replacement for an injured Dennis Siver. Poirier faced Cub Swanson in the co-main event on February 16, 2013, at UFC on Fuel TV: Barão vs. McDonald. During the fight, both fighters landed punches which appeared to hurt the other. Poirier scored leg kicks and double leg takedowns. Swanson retaliated with head kicks and submission attempts. Poirier lost the fight via unanimous decision (29–28, 30–27, 30–27).

Poirier faced Erik Koch on August 31, 2013, at UFC 164. Poirier hurt Koch with punches throughout the fight, knocking him down with a punch near the end of round 1 and nearly finishing the fight. He won the bout by unanimous decision. After the win, Poirier wanted a rematch with Cub Swanson. He told reporter Ariel Helwani that Swanson must "be a man".

Poirier faced Diego Brandão on December 28, 2013, at UFC 168. He won the fight via knockout in the first round.

==== 2014 ====
Poirier faced Akira Corassani at The Ultimate Fighter Nations Finale on April 16, 2014. He won the fight via TKO in the second round. The win also earned Poirier his second Fight of the Night bonus award.

Poirier faced Conor McGregor on September 27, 2014, at UFC 178. He lost the fight by TKO in the first round. This was the first time Poirier was stopped by strikes. After the match, Poirier said: "I always saw it as a plus but the Conor McGregor fight was the turning point. I remember I was backstage getting ready to walk out and I saw him and he threw this smile and pointed at me. I don't know why but it really got to me, man. It really messed with my head."

After the loss, Poirier transferred up a weight class to the Lightweight division. Poirier said that it was because weight cuts were distracting him from training. He also claimed that he would never go back to featherweight nor move up to welterweight. "This is the division (lightweight) I'm going to win the belt at," said Poirier in an interview.

==== 2015 ====
Poirier faced Carlos Diego Ferreira in a lightweight bout on April 4, 2015, at UFC Fight Night 63. He won the fight via knockout in the first round. The win also earned Poirier his first Performance of the Night bonus award and a disclosed pay of $118,000, the highest disclosed pay received by Poirier at the time.

Poirier faced Yancy Medeiros on June 6, 2015, at UFC Fight Night 68. He won the fight via TKO in the first round, after dropping Medeiros twice with punches. The win also earned Poirier his second Performance of the Night bonus award.

==== 2016 ====
Poirier was expected to face Joseph Duffy on October 24, 2015, at UFC Fight Night 76. However, Duffy pulled out of the fight on October 21, three days prior to the event, after sustaining a concussion during a sparring session. In turn, the pairing was rescheduled and took place on January 2, 2016, at UFC 195. Poirier won the fight by unanimous decision. After the bout, Poirier was hospitalized for a broken nose. He had a lay off for six weeks due to the injury.

Poirier next faced Bobby Green on June 4, 2016, at UFC 199. He won the fight via knockout in the first round. Poirier received a disclosed pay of $110,000, the second highest disclosed pay received by Poirier in his career at that point.

Poirier faced Michael Johnson in his second main-event bout on September 17, 2016, at UFC Fight Night 94. Poirier lost the fight via first-round knockout.

==== 2017 ====
Poirier fought Jim Miller on February 11, 2017, at UFC 208. Poirier punched Miller against the fence, which appeared to hurt Miller. In return, Miller repeatedly kicked Poirier's legs. Later on, Miller swept Poirier onto the mat and failed a kimura attempt. Poirier won the back-and-forth fight via majority decision. The win also earned Poirier $50,000 and his third Fight of the Night bonus award. Due to injuries sustained during the fight, Poirier was suspended indefinitely.

After the suspension, Poirier fought Eddie Alvarez on May 13, 2017, at UFC 211. Poirier rocked Alvarez in the second round but was subsequently dropped when Alvarez landed two illegal knee strikes while Poirier was against the fence. With the Texas commission not operating under the new unified rules, referee Herb Dean declared the fight a no contest, as he did not believe Alvarez knew Poirier was a grounded opponent at the time.

Poirier faced Anthony Pettis on November 11, 2017, at UFC Fight Night 120. He won the fight via TKO after Pettis tapped out due to a broken rib when Poirier applied a body triangle in the third round. This fight also won him the Fight of the Night bonus award.

==== 2018 ====
After the Pettis fight, Poirier signed a new contract with UFC although he had three fights remaining in his previous contract. Poirier faced Justin Gaethje on April 14, 2018, at UFC on Fox 29. He won the fight via TKO in the fourth round. This fight earned him the Fight of the Night bonus award.

Poirier faced Eddie Alvarez in a rematch on July 28, 2018, in the main event at UFC on Fox 30. He won the fight via TKO in the second round. This win earned him the Performance of the Night award.

On August 3, 2018, it was announced that Poirier had agreed to fight Nate Diaz on November 3, 2018, in Madison Square Garden. The bout was expected to be the co-headliner of UFC 230. However, Diaz pulled out, with Poirier opting to get a hip surgery to fix long-term health complications rather than fight a different opponent, so as a result the bout was announced to be cancelled on October 10, 2018.

==== 2019 ====
As a result of the Khabib Nurmagomedov incident at UFC 229, the then lightweight champion Nurmagomedov was unable to defend his undisputed title until late 2019 which led to an interim lightweight title fight. For the Interim UFC Lightweight Championship, Poirier faced UFC Featherweight Champion Max Holloway on April 13, 2019, at UFC 236. He won the back–and–forth fight by unanimous decision to earn the title and also break Holloway's thirteen fight win-streak. This fight also earned him the Fight of the Night award, his fourth consecutive performance bonus.

Poirier faced the undefeated and undisputed UFC Lightweight Champion Khabib Nurmagomedov on September 7, 2019, in a title unification bout at UFC 242. He lost the bout via rear-naked choke submission in the third round.

==== 2020 ====
Poirier faced Dan Hooker on June 27, 2020, at UFC on ESPN: Poirier vs. Hooker. He won the exciting back-and-forth fight via unanimous decision. This fight earned him his seventh Fight of the Night award. The bout was widely considered one of the greatest fights of the year and was a contender for multiple awards.

==== 2021 ====
As the first bout of his new contract, Poirier faced Conor McGregor in a rematch of their 2014 bout at UFC 257 on January 24, 2021. He won the fight via technical knockout in the second round, becoming the first person to defeat McGregor by knockout in an MMA bout. This win earned him the Performance of the Night award.

Poirier faced McGregor for the third time on July 10, 2021, at UFC 264. Poirier won the fight in round one via technical knockout after the ringside doctor stopped the bout due to McGregor suffering a broken tibia, rendering him unable to continue.

Poirier faced Charles Oliveira for the UFC Lightweight Championship on December 11, 2021 at UFC 269. He lost the fight via a standing rear-naked choke submission in the third round.

==== 2022 ====
Poirier faced Michael Chandler on November 12, 2022, at UFC 281. He won the fight via a rear-naked choke submission in the third round. This fight earned him the Fight of the Night award.

==== 2023 ====
Poirier faced Justin Gaethje in a rematch of their 2018 bout for symbolic UFC "BMF" belt on July 29, 2023 at UFC 291. He lost the fight via head kick knockout in round two.

==== 2024 ====
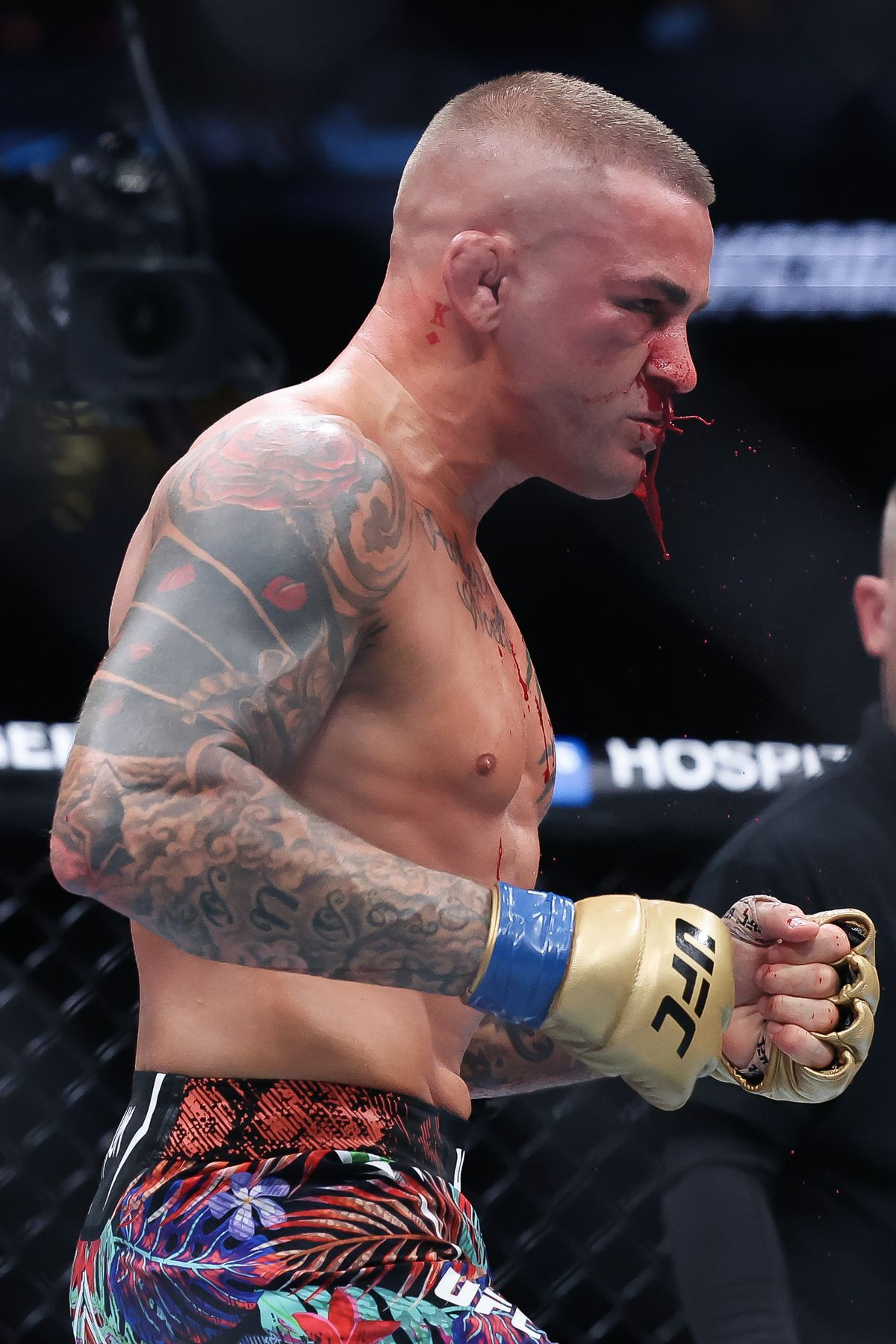
Poirier in 2024 at UFC 302

Poirier faced Benoît Saint Denis in a 5 round co-main for UFC 299 on March 9, 2024. He won the bout by knockout in the second round. This fight earned him another Fight of the Night award.

Poirier faced Islam Makhachev for the UFC Lightweight Championship at UFC 302 on June 1, 2024. He lost the bout via a D'Arce choke in the fifth round. This fight earned him another Fight of the Night award and a $50,000 bonus.

==== 2025 ====
In his retirement bout, Poirier faced former UFC Featherweight Champion Max Holloway in a trilogy bout for the symbolic UFC "BMF" belt on July 19, 2025, at UFC 318 in his home state of Louisiana. He lost the fight by unanimous decision and retired after the bout.

== Fighting style ==
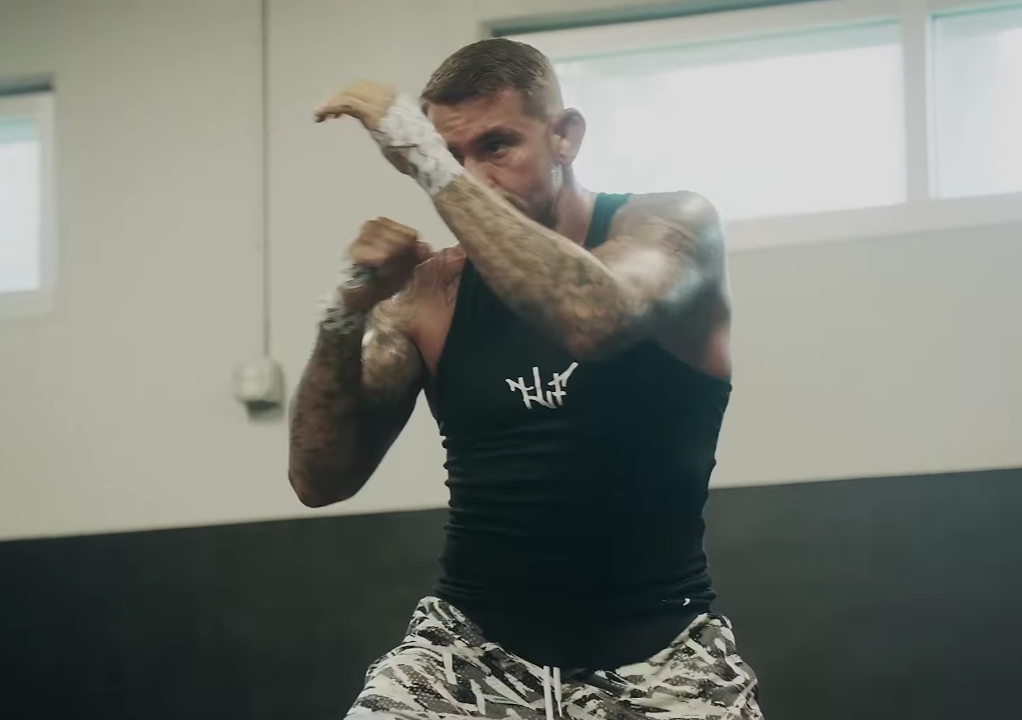
Poirier stance.

Poirier holds a black belt in Brazilian jiu-jitsu under Tim Credeur, but mostly finishes his opponents through his proficiency in striking. His boxing skills are lauded, and he has showcased them in significant victories over elite-level strikers such as Justin Gaethje, Eddie Alvarez, Dan Hooker, Max Holloway, and Conor McGregor. He is noted for his shifting punching style and extensive use of the shoulder roll as well as forearm and elbow blocks from the stonewall defense.

Poirier used to train at Gladiators Academy under retired MMA fighter Tim Credeur. After his loss to Chan Sung Jung, Poirier moved to American Top Team.

== Outside the cage ==
=== Charity ===
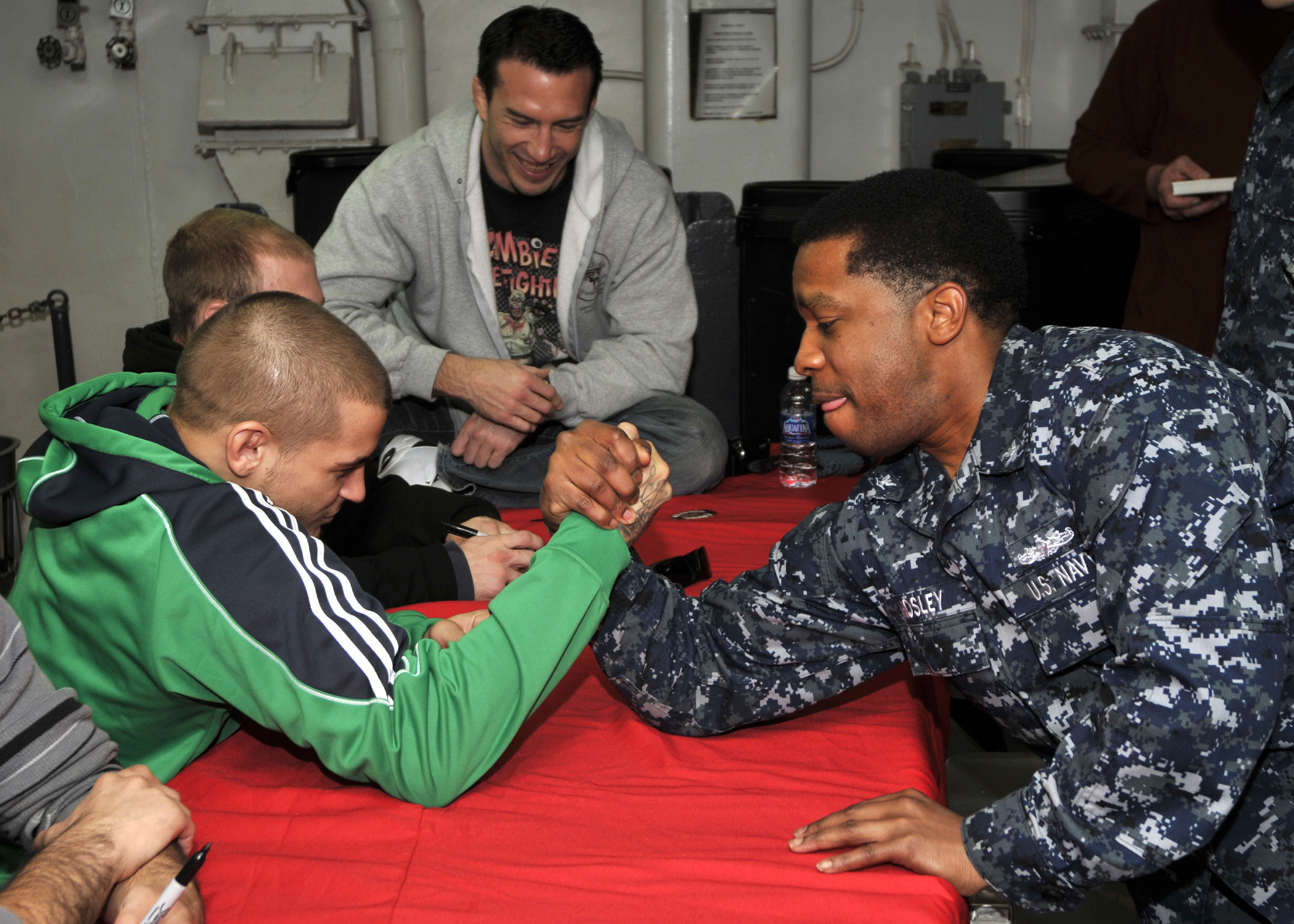
Petty Officer 3rd Class Christopher Mosley arm wrestles with Poirier aboard USS George Washington in 2011.

Poirier auctioned his UFC 211 kit on eBay to raise money for Second Harvest Food Bank. The highest bidder paid $5,100 for Poirier's shirt, gloves, cap, hand wraps and shorts. In April 2018, Poirier and his wife founded the Good Fight Foundation. Poirier proceeded to auction his UFC Fight Night 120 and UFC on Fox 29 fight kits as well. The money raised went to the family of a deceased Lafayette police officer and the Acadiana Outreach Center, respectively. Poirier also auctioned his UFC on Fox 30 fight kit and used the money raised to buy 500 backpacks for school children in his hometown of Lafayette.

After his bout with Nurmagomedov at UFC 242, the two swapped shirts after the fight. In his post-fight interview, Nurmagomedov said that he would be selling the shirt Poirier gave him and donating the proceeds to Poirier's charity. Likewise, Poirier announced that he would be auctioning off his UFC 242 fighting equipment to raise funds for the foundation. After the event, Poirier auctioned his fight kit with Nurmagomedov's walkout shirt for $60,200. Simultaneously, Nurmagomedov sold Poirier's walkout shirt for $100,000 which was matched by Dana White for a combined total of a $200,000 donation to Poirier's foundation. According to Poirier, his foundation is working with Justin Wren's Fight for the Forgotten to help provide clean drinking water to the Echuya Batwa people in Uganda.

Poirier was set to face Garry Tonon in a grappling match at SubStars event on February 21, 2020, from which Poirier was supposed to be donating his ticket and PPV sales and part of his purse to his foundation. However, Tonon suffered an injury a week before the match and the bout was canceled.

During the COVID-19 pandemic, Poirier's foundation donated 1,000 meals to the employees of three major hospitals in his native Lafayette area.

On June 26, 2020, Poirier was awarded the Forrest Griffin Community Award by UFC for his charity work.

In recognition of Poirier's charitable contributions, Lafayette Mayor-President Josh Guillory declared March 15, 2021 Dustin Poirier Day in Lafayette, Louisiana and awarded Poirier a key to the city.

While still in the octagon immediately after his loss to Charles Oliveira, Poirier pledged twenty-thousand dollars ($20,000) to a charity of Oliveira's choosing in Oliveira's native Brazil, with the money eventually going to the Charles Oliveira Institute, which teaches martial arts for free to kids in Guaruja, Brazil.

After UFC 257, McGregor was scheduled to donate $500,000 to the Good Fight Foundation as he had pledged before their scheduled bout. In April 2021, Dustin Poirier stated the donation had not been made. The dispute has been a source of controversy in sports media.

In July 2023, Poirier spent a day with a 17-year-old boy and cancer patient while training for UFC 291 as part of the Make-A-Wish Foundation.

=== Business ventures ===
Outside of fighting, Poirier has pursued in business and charity ventures.

On December 8, 2020, Poirier announced the release of his new Cajun hot sauce brand Poirier's Louisiana Style Hot Sauce. Poirier founded the Good Fight Foundation, a charity where athletes and fans can support underserved communities.

On January 5, 2022, Poirier announced the release of his bourbon Rare Stash Bourbon.

== Personal life ==
Poirier resides in Lafayette, Louisiana with his family. During his active career, he conducted training camps at American Top Team in South Florida, where he temporarily relocated ahead of fights. He is married to Jolie LeBlanc, and the couple welcomed their first child, a daughter, in 2016. In November 2025, they had a son.

Poirier got his first tattoo at the age of 14. Currently, his chest and arms are covered in tattoos, including one on his chest that reads 武士道 (bushidō), which means "the way of warriors" in Japanese.

== Legal issues ==
On June 21, 2026, Poirier was removed from a flight in Hartsfield–Jackson Atlanta International Airport for public intoxication and arrested. Responding officers' body-camera footage showed Poirier insulting the airport staff and provoking an officer to fight him, taunting the officer by saying "it's gonna be bad, my nigga." In a statement released by Poirier via Instagram, he wrote "I'm at the point where I need some help" and "alcohol isn't the answer."

== Filmography ==
=== Films ===
Year	Title	Role	Notes
2011	Fightville	Himself	Main character
2011	Never Back Down 2: The Beatdown	Cage Fighter	Uncredited Cameo
TBA	Road House 2	TBA	Post-production

=== Video games ===
Year	Title	Role	Notes
2014	EA Sports UFC	Himself	Playable character
2016	EA Sports UFC 2	Himself	Playable character
2018	EA Sports UFC 3	Himself	Playable character
2020	EA Sports UFC 4	Himself	Playable character
2023	EA Sports UFC 5	Himself	Playable character
2026	EA Sports UFC 6	Himself	Playable character

== Championships and accomplishments ==
- Ultimate Fighting Championship
  - Interim UFC Lightweight Championship (One time)
  - Fight of the Night (Ten times) vs. Jung Chan-Sung, Akira Corassani, Jim Miller, Anthony Pettis, Justin Gaethje 1, Max Holloway 2, Dan Hooker, Michael Chandler, Benoît Saint Denis and Islam Makhachev
    - Tied (Edson Barboza) for second most Fight of the Night bonuses in UFC history (10)
  - Submission of the Night (One time) vs. Max Holloway 1
  - Performance of the Night (Four times) vs. Carlos Diego Ferreira, Yancy Medeiros, Eddie Alvarez 2, and Conor McGregor 2
    - Tied (Joe Lauzon) for sixth most Post-Fight night bonuses in UFC history (15)
    - Sixth most Post-Fight bonuses in UFC Lightweight division history (12)
  - Tied (Jon Jones, Georges St-Pierre and Amanda Nunes) for most finishes against former UFC Champions (6)
    - Tied (Vitor Belfort) for the 3rd longest fight streak against former UFC Champions (6)
    - Tied (Jon Jones) for the 2nd longest unbeaten streak against former UFC Champions (5)
    - Tied (Alex Pereira, Islam Makhachev and Merab Dvalishvili) for the 3rd longest win streak against former UFC Champions (4)
  - Second most knockouts in UFC Lightweight division history (9) (behind Drew Dober)
    - Tied (Anthony Johnson, Thiago Santos, Anderson Silva & Drew Dober) for fifth most knockouts in modern UFC history (11)
  - Tied (Demian Maia & Jon Jones) for seventh most wins in UFC history (22)
  - Tied (Matt Brown, Vicente Luque & Max Holloway) for fifth most finishes in UFC history (15)
    - Tied (Donald Cerrone, Tony Ferguson & Islam Makhachev) for fifth most finishes in UFC Lightweight division history (10)
  - Fifth most knockdowns landed in UFC history (15)
  - Tied (Donald Cerrone) for third most knockdowns landed in UFC Lightweight division history (11)
  - Second most significant strikes landed in UFC Lightweight division history (1308)
    - Fifth most significant strikes landed in UFC history (1861)
  - Fourth most total strikes landed in UFC Lightweight division history (1631)
  - Holds wins over five former UFC Champions - Max Holloway (twice), Conor McGregor (twice), Eddie Alvarez, Anthony Pettis, and Justin Gaethje
  - The only fighter to win the UFC interim belt defeating a current UFC undisputed Champion
  - 2020 Forrest Griffin Community Award
  - UFC Honors Awards
    - 2019: President's Choice Fight of the Year Nominee vs. Max Holloway 2
    - 2020: President's Choice Fight of the Year Nominee vs. Dan Hooker
    - 2022: President's Choice Fight of the Year Nominee vs. Michael Chandler
    - 2024: President's Choice Fight of the Year Nominee vs. Benoît Saint Denis
  - UFC.com Awards
    - 2011: Ranked #7 Import of the Year & Ranked #10 Upset of the Year vs. Josh Grispi
    - 2012: Half-Year Awards: Best Fight of the 1HY & Ranked #2 Fight of the Year vs. Jung Chan-sung
    - 2017: Ranked #8 Fighter of the Year & Ranked #4 Fight of the Year vs. Anthony Pettis
    - 2018: Ranked #2 Fight of the Year vs. Justin Gaethje 1 & Ranked #9 Fighter of the Year
    - 2019: Ranked #4 Fight of the Year vs. Max Holloway 2
    - 2020: Ranked #3 Fight of the Year vs. Dan Hooker
    - 2021: Ranked #6 Upset of the Year vs. Conor McGregor 2 & Ranked #10 Knockout of the Year vs. Conor McGregor 2
    - 2022: Ranked #3 Fight of the Year vs. Michael Chandler
    - 2024: Ranked #5 Fight of the Year vs. Benoît Saint Denis, Ranked #4 Fight of the Year vs. Islam Makhachev & Half-Year Awards: Best Fight of the 1HY vs. Islam Makhachev
- International Sport Combat Federation
  - ISCF Amateur Lightweight Tournament Championship (One time)
- MMA Junkie
  - 2014 April Fight of the Month vs. Akira Corassani at The Ultimate Fighter Nations Finale: Bisping vs. Kennedy
  - 2018 Fight of the Year vs. Justin Gaethje at UFC on Fox: Poirier vs. Gaethje
  - 2018 April Fight of the Month vs. Justin Gaethje at UFC on Fox: Poirier vs. Gaethje
  - 2020 June Fight of the Month vs. Dan Hooker at UFC on ESPN: Poirier vs. Hooker
  - 2021 January Fight of the Month vs. Conor McGregor at UFC 257
  - 2022 November Fight of the Month vs. Michael Chandler at UFC 281
- MMA Weekly
  - 2018 Fight of the Year vs. Justin Gaethje at UFC on Fox: Poirier vs. Gaethje
- MMA Fighting
  - 2012 Fight of the Year vs. Jung Chan-Sung at UFC on Fuel TV 3
  - 2018 Fight of the Year vs. Justin Gaethje at UFC on Fox: Poirier vs. Gaethje
  - 2024 Third Team MMA All-Star
  - 2025 #3 Ranked Fight of the Year vs. Max Holloway at UFC 318
  - 2025 Walkout of the Year at UFC 318
- Wrestling Observer Newsletter
  - 2012 Fight of the Year vs. Jung Chan-Sung at UFC on Fuel TV 3
  - 2018 Fight of the Year vs. Justin Gaethje at UFC on Fox: Poirier vs. Gaethje
- World MMA Awards
  - 2019 – July 2020 Fighting Spirit of the Year for charity - Good Fight Foundation
- CBS Sports
  - 2017 #4 Ranked UFC Fight of the Year vs. Jim Miller at UFC 208
  - 2018 UFC Fight of the Year vs. Justin Gaethje at UFC on Fox: Poirier vs. Gaethje
  - 2019 #2 Ranked UFC Fight of the Year vs. Max Holloway at UFC 236
  - 2020 #3 Ranked UFC Fight of the Year vs. Dan Hooker at UFC on ESPN: Poirier vs. Hooker
- ESPN
  - 2020 Round of the Year Round 2 vs. Dan Hooker at UFC on ESPN: Poirier vs. Hooker
  - 2020 Mensch of the Year
- Bleacher Report
  - 2012 Fight of the Year vs. Jung Chan-Sung at UFC on Fuel TV 3
- Bloody Elbow
  - 2012 Fight of the Year vs. Jung Chan-Sung at UFC on Fuel TV 3
- FIGHT! Magazine
  - 2012 Fight of the Year vs. Jung Chan-Sung at UFC on Fuel TV 3
- MMA Mania
  - 2024 #4 Ranked Fight of the Year vs. Islam Makhachev at UFC 302
- MMA Sucka
  - 2018 Fight of the Year vs. Justin Gaethje at UFC on Fox: Poirier vs. Gaethje
- Combat Press
  - 2018 Fight of the Year vs. Justin Gaethje at UFC on Fox: Poirier vs. Gaethje
- Slacky Awards
  - 2018 Technical Turn-Around of the Year tied with Henry Cejudo and Jan Błachowicz

=== State/Local ===
- May 2019: Key to the City of Lafayette
- Greater New Orleans Sports Foundation
  - 2025: Legacy Award

== Mixed martial arts record ==
Professional record breakdown
41 matches	30 wins	10 losses
By knockout	15	3
By submission	8	4
By decision	7	3
No contests	1	

Res.	Record	Opponent	Method	Event	Date	Round	Time	Location	Notes
Loss	30–10 (1)	Max Holloway	Decision (unanimous)	UFC 318	July 19, 2025	5	5:00	New Orleans, Louisiana, United States	For the symbolic UFC "BMF" title.
Loss	30–9 (1)	Islam Makhachev	Submission (brabo choke)	UFC 302	June 1, 2024	5	2:42	Newark, New Jersey, United States	For the UFC Lightweight Championship. Fight of the Night.
Win	30–8 (1)	Benoît Saint Denis	KO (punches)	UFC 299	March 9, 2024	2	2:32	Miami, Florida, United States	Fight of the Night.
Loss	29–8 (1)	Justin Gaethje	KO (head kick)	UFC 291	July 29, 2023	2	1:00	Salt Lake City, Utah, United States	For the symbolic UFC "BMF" title.
Win	29–7 (1)	Michael Chandler	Submission (rear-naked choke)	UFC 281	November 12, 2022	3	2:00	New York City, New York, United States	Fight of the Night.
Loss	28–7 (1)	Charles Oliveira	Submission (rear-naked choke)	UFC 269	December 11, 2021	3	1:02	Las Vegas, Nevada, United States	For the UFC Lightweight Championship.
Win	28–6 (1)	Conor McGregor	TKO (leg injury)	UFC 264	July 10, 2021	1	5:00	Las Vegas, Nevada, United States	
Win	27–6 (1)	Conor McGregor	KO (punches)	UFC 257	January 24, 2021	2	2:32	Abu Dhabi, United Arab Emirates	Performance of the Night.
Win	26–6 (1)	Dan Hooker	Decision (unanimous)	UFC on ESPN: Poirier vs. Hooker	June 27, 2020	5	5:00	Las Vegas, Nevada, United States	Fight of the Night.
Loss	25–6 (1)	Khabib Nurmagomedov	Submission (rear-naked choke)	UFC 242	September 7, 2019	3	2:06	Abu Dhabi, United Arab Emirates	For the UFC Lightweight Championship.
Win	25–5 (1)	Max Holloway	Decision (unanimous)	UFC 236	April 13, 2019	5	5:00	Atlanta, Georgia, United States	Won the interim UFC Lightweight Championship. Fight of the Night.
Win	24–5 (1)	Eddie Alvarez	TKO (punches)	UFC on Fox: Alvarez vs. Poirier 2	July 28, 2018	2	4:05	Calgary, Alberta, Canada	Performance of the Night.
Win	23–5 (1)	Justin Gaethje	TKO (punches)	UFC on Fox: Poirier vs. Gaethje	April 14, 2018	4	0:33	Glendale, Arizona, United States	Fight of the Night. Gaethje was deducted one point in round 3 due to repeated eye pokes.
Win	22–5 (1)	Anthony Pettis	Submission (body triangle)	UFC Fight Night: Poirier vs. Pettis	November 11, 2017	3	2:08	Norfolk, Virginia, United States	Fight of the Night.
NC	21–5 (1)	Eddie Alvarez	NC (illegal knee)	UFC 211	May 13, 2017	2	4:12	Dallas, Texas, United States	Alvarez landed illegal knees to Poirier's head, who was a downed opponent.
Win	21–5	Jim Miller	Decision (majority)	UFC 208	February 11, 2017	3	5:00	Brooklyn, New York, United States	Fight of the Night.
Loss	20–5	Michael Johnson	KO (punches)	UFC Fight Night: Poirier vs. Johnson	September 17, 2016	1	1:35	Hidalgo, Texas, United States	
Win	20–4	Bobby Green	KO (punches)	UFC 199	June 4, 2016	1	2:53	Inglewood, California, United States	
Win	19–4	Joseph Duffy	Decision (unanimous)	UFC 195	January 2, 2016	3	5:00	Las Vegas, Nevada, United States	
Win	18–4	Yancy Medeiros	TKO (body kick and punches)	UFC Fight Night: Boetsch vs. Henderson	June 6, 2015	1	2:38	New Orleans, Louisiana, United States	Catchweight (159 lb) bout; Medeiros missed weight. Performance of the Night.
Win	17–4	Carlos Diego Ferreira	KO (punches)	UFC Fight Night: Mendes vs. Lamas	April 4, 2015	1	3:45	Fairfax, Virginia, United States	Return to Lightweight. Performance of the Night.
Loss	16–4	Conor McGregor	TKO (punches)	UFC 178	September 27, 2014	1	1:46	Las Vegas, Nevada, United States	
Win	16–3	Akira Corassani	TKO (punches)	The Ultimate Fighter Nations Finale: Bisping vs. Kennedy	April 16, 2014	2	0:42	Quebec City, Quebec, Canada	Fight of the Night.
Win	15–3	Diego Brandão	KO (punches)	UFC 168	December 28, 2013	1	4:54	Las Vegas, Nevada, United States	Catchweight (151.5 lb) bout; Brandão missed weight.
Win	14–3	Erik Koch	Decision (unanimous)	UFC 164	August 31, 2013	3	5:00	Milwaukee, Wisconsin, United States	
Loss	13–3	Cub Swanson	Decision (unanimous)	UFC on Fuel TV: Barão vs. McDonald	February 16, 2013	3	5:00	London, England	
Win	13–2	Jonathan Brookins	Submission (brabo choke)	The Ultimate Fighter: Team Carwin vs. Team Nelson Finale	December 15, 2012	1	4:15	Las Vegas, Nevada, United States	
Loss	12–2	Jung Chan-sung	Technical Submission (brabo choke)	UFC on Fuel TV: The Korean Zombie vs. Poirier	May 15, 2012	4	1:07	Fairfax, Virginia, United States	Fight of the Night.
Win	12–1	Max Holloway	Submission (triangle armbar)	UFC 143	February 4, 2012	1	3:23	Las Vegas, Nevada, United States	Submission of the Night.
Win	11–1	Pablo Garza	Submission (brabo choke)	UFC on Fox: Velasquez vs. dos Santos	November 12, 2011	2	1:32	Anaheim, California, United States	
Win	10–1	Jason Young	Decision (unanimous)	UFC 131	June 11, 2011	3	5:00	Vancouver, British Columbia, Canada	
Win	9–1	Josh Grispi	Decision (unanimous)	UFC 125	January 1, 2011	3	5:00	Las Vegas, Nevada, United States	Featherweight debut.
Win	8–1	Zach Micklewright	TKO (punches)	WEC 52	November 11, 2010	1	0:53	Las Vegas, Nevada, United States	
Loss	7–1	Danny Castillo	Decision (unanimous)	WEC 50	August 18, 2010	3	5:00	Las Vegas, Nevada, United States	
Win	7–0	Derek Gauthier	KO (punches)	Ringside MMA 7	June 18, 2010	1	0:57	Montreal, Quebec, Canada	
Win	6–0	Derrick Krantz	Submission (armbar)	USA MMA 11	March 6, 2010	2	3:35	Lafayette, Louisiana, United States	
Win	5–0	Ronny Lis	Submission (armbar)	USA MMA 10	November 13, 2009	1	0:51	Lake Charles, Louisiana, United States	
Win	4–0	Daniel Watts	KO (punches)	Bang FC 10	October 31, 2009	1	1:26	Greenville, Mississippi, United States	
Win	3–0	Joe Torrez	TKO (punches)	USA MMA 8	August 1, 2009	1	2:37	New Iberia, Louisiana, United States	
Win	2–0	Nate Jolly	Submission (armbar)	Cajun FC 1	June 26, 2009	2	3:54	New Iberia, Louisiana, United States	
Win	1–0	Aaron Suarez	KO (punches)	USA MMA 7	May 16, 2009	1	1:19	Shreveport, Louisiana, United States	

=== Amateur mixed martial arts record ===
Amateur record breakdown		
7 matches	7 wins	0 losses
By knockout	5	0
By submission	1	0
By decision	1	0

Res.	Record	Opponent	Method	Event	Date	Round	Time	Location	Notes
Win	7–0	Paul Soileau	KO (punches)	USA MMA 6	February 28, 2009	2	0:16	Lafayette, Louisiana, United States	
Win	6–0	Gilbert Jimenez	Decision (unanimous)	No Love Entertainment: Full Throttle	January 24, 2009	3	4:00	New Orleans, Louisiana United States	
Win	5–0	Mario Jaquez	KO (punches)	Collision at the Coliseum 4: Caged Conflict	November 28, 2008	1	0:25	Lafayette, Louisiana, United States	
Win	4–0	Will Barlow	KO (punches)	Ring Rulers: Rumble on the River	July 26, 2008	2	0:24	Alexandria, Louisiana, United States	
Win	3–0	Chad Buckley	TKO (punches)	ISCF: World Amateur Championships 2008	May 4, 2008	2	0:35	Cedar Rapids, Iowa, United States	Won the ISCF Lightweight Tournament Championship.
Win	2–0	Kody Blazek	Submission (triangle choke)	ISCF: World Amateur Championships 2008	May 3, 2008	1	2:02	Cedar Rapids, Iowa, United States	ISCF Lightweight Tournament Semi-Finals.
Win	1–0	Wesley Branch	TKO (punches)	ISCF: Battle Cage 360	December 8, 2007	1	1:52	Texarkana, Arkansas, United States	Welterweight debut.

== Pay-per-view bouts ==
No.	Event	Fight	Date	Venue	City	PPV Buys
1.	UFC 236	Holloway vs. Poirier 2	April 13, 2019	State Farm Arena	Atlanta, Georgia, U.S	100,000
2.	UFC 242	Khabib vs. Poirier	September 7, 2019	The Arena, Yas Island	Abu Dhabi, United Arab Emirates	1,000,000
3.	UFC 257	Poirier vs. McGregor 2	January 24, 2021	Etihad Arena	Abu Dhabi, United Arab Emirates	1,600,000
4.	UFC 264	Poirier vs. McGregor 3	July 10, 2021	T-Mobile Arena	Las Vegas, Nevada, US	1,800,000
5.	UFC 269	Oliveira vs. Poirier	December 12, 2021	T-Mobile Arena	Las Vegas, Nevada, US	500,000
6.	UFC 291	Poirier vs. Gaethje 2	July 29, 2023	Delta Center	Salt Lake City, Utah, U.S	Not Disclosed
7.	UFC 302	Makhachev vs. Poirier	June 1, 2024	Prudential Center	Newark, New Jersey, U.S	410,000
8.	UFC 318	Holloway vs. Poirier 3	July 19, 2025	Smoothie King Center	New Orleans, Louisiana, U.S	Not Disclosed

== See also ==
- List of male mixed martial artists

Achievements
Vacant Title last held by Tony Ferguson	2nd UFC Interim Lightweight Champion; April 13, 2019 – September 7, 2019	Vacant Title next held by Justin Gaethje
