= The Korean Zombie =

South Korean mixed martial artist (born 1987)

Jung Chan-sung
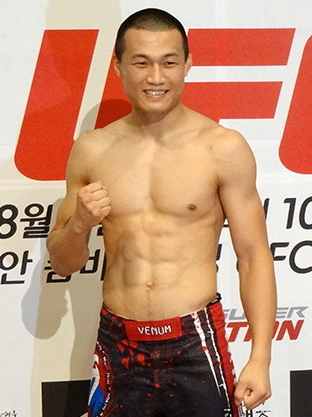
- Jung in July 2013
- Born: Jung Chan-sung; March 17, 1987 (age 39); Pohang, South Korea
- Native name: 정찬성
- Other names: The Korean Zombie
- Height: 5 ft 9 in (1.75 m)
- Weight: 145 lb (66 kg)
- Division: Featherweight (2008–2023); Lightweight (2007)
- Reach: 72 in (183 cm)
- Stance: Orthodox
- Fighting out of: Seoul, South Korea
- Team: Korean Zombie MMA; Fight Ready (2019–2023)
- Rank: 3rd dan black belt in Hapkido; 2nd dan black belt in Taekwondo; Black belt in Judo; Black belt in Brazilian Jiu-Jitsu under Santino Defranco
- Years active: 2007–2023

Kickboxing record
- Total: 21
- Wins: 15
- By knockout: 11
- Losses: 6

Mixed martial arts record
- Total: 25
- Wins: 17
- By knockout: 6
- By submission: 8
- By decision: 3
- Losses: 8
- By knockout: 5
- By decision: 3

Other information
- Mixed martial arts record from Sherdog

YouTube information
- Channel: 정찬성 Korean Zombie
- Subscribers: 1.1 million
- Views: 496.8 million
- Last updated: January 17, 2026

Korean name
- Hangul: 정찬성
- Hanja: 鄭讚成
- RR: Jeong Chanseong
- MR: Chŏng Ch'ansŏng

Jung Chan-sung (Korean: 정찬성; born March 17, 1987), anglicized as Chan Sung Jung and better known professionally as The Korean Zombie, is a South Korean former professional mixed martial artist best known for competing in the Featherweight division of the Ultimate Fighting Championship (UFC).

A professional competitor since 2007, Jung had also competed for World Extreme Cagefighting (WEC), Pancrase, World Victory Road, and DEEP. His nickname, "The Korean Zombie", comes from his perceived zombie-like ability to continue to move forward and fight aggressively, even after taking heavy blows.

== Background ==
Born in Pohang, North Gyeongsang in 1987, Jung moved to Namyangju, a satellite city of Seoul when he was in his mid-teens. Due to his slight stature and his rural origins, he was bullied constantly by his classmates and got into many fights as a result. When his aunt could no longer stand to see Jung's predicament, she took him to a nearby hapkido gym when he was around 14 years old. Jung trained in kickboxing until his junior year of high school. He graduated from Daegu Gyeongbuk Institute of Science and Technology. Later he also began training in Judo and Brazilian Jiu Jitsu.

At the age of 18, Jung joined the South Korean Navy and started training in Taekwondo. In June 2007, he won a Sambo tournament arranged by the Korean Sambo Association, and in December of the same year, he won the Lightweight division of the Pancrase Korea Neo-Blood Tournament after defeating fellow South Koreans Yoo In Seok and Lee Hyung Geol. Aged 20, Jung began mixed martial arts and made his professional debut soon after. In May 2008, he participated in and won KOREA-FC's 8-man MMA tournament in the 65 kg division. Jung was also a participant in a show called Street Fighter in 2007, which aired on South Korean cable television. He participated in the 70 kg tournament and won. The tournament was stand-up only (similar to K-1 but not in a ring).

== Mixed martial arts career ==
=== Early career ===
Jung made his professional debut in June 2007 and in December the same year, he won a Lightweight Tournament arranged by Pancrase Korea. In 2008 he won both his fights for Japanese promotion DEEP. He then entered the 2009 Sengoku Featherweight Grand Prix where he won his first-round fight but was eliminated from the tournament by the eventual winner Masanori Kanehara.

On August 16, 2008, he defeated Michihiro Omigawa at DEEP: Gladiator via unanimous decision. His next fight was against Fanjin Son at DEEP: 39 Impact where he won via knockout in 17 seconds.

=== Sengoku ===
Jung then entered the 2009 Sengoku Featherweight Grand-Prix and was matched up with Shintaro Ishiwatari in his first-round fight at Sengoku 7. After dropping Ishiwatari once in stand-up striking, Jung hit Ishiwatari with a right hand forcing him to give up his back. From there Jung sunk in a rear-naked choke submission forcing Ishiwatari to submit at 4:29 of the first round.

In his second-round fight at Sengoku 8 on May 2, 2009, he lost via unanimous decision to Masanori Kanehara officially eliminating him from the tournament. The decision was considered questionable by the English commentators and many fans (especially given Sengoku's history of biased decisions against Korean fighters), who felt that Jung had done enough to deserve the decision. On June 7, 2009, it was announced Jung would face American Matt Jaggers at Sengoku 9 in a reserve bout for the tournament with the winner stepping in as a replacement should some of the remaining fighters be unable to continue. Jung ended up winning the fight by triangle choke submission at 1:25 of the second round, but was not required to step in as a replacement.

=== World Extreme Cagefighting ===
Chan Sung Jung then signed with World Extreme Cagefighting. He made his American and WEC debut against Leonard Garcia (who replaced injured opponent Cub Swanson) on April 24, 2010 at WEC 48 Jung lost the fight via split decision. Many MMA publications and fans (including many in the Sacramento home crowd) opposed the decision, which has led again to questions about the accuracy of the fight judging. However, the bout was awarded the Fight of the Night honors; this was later declared the Fight of the Year by the Wrestling Observer Newsletter.

Jung next faced George Roop on September 30, 2010, at WEC 51. He lost the fight via knockout due to a head kick in the second round.

=== Ultimate Fighting Championship ===
Jung was expected to face Rani Yahya on January 22, 2011, at UFC Fight Night 23. However, Jung was forced from the card with an injury.

A rematch with Garcia was scheduled for March 26, 2011, at UFC Fight Night 24, after Jung stepped in to replace an injured Nam Phan. Jung was able to avenge the original loss after submitting Garcia with a twister in the final second of the second round. This was the first time in the history of the UFC that a twister submission finished an opponent and the win earned Jung his first Submission of the Night honors. This was later awarded for the Submission of the Year by the World MMA Awards. In his post-fight interview, Jung stated he learned the move by watching Eddie Bravo videos on YouTube.

Jung faced former title challenger Mark Hominick on December 10, 2011, at UFC 140. Jung won the bout via KO at seven seconds of the first round, which tied a UFC record for the fastest knockout at the time. Jung's victory over Mark Hominick earned him a $75,000 Knockout of the Night bonus. The victory also earned Jung much praise in his native South Korea, appearing on news broadcasts on the country's major national television channels (such as KBS).

Jung faced Dustin Poirier on May 15, 2012, at UFC on Fuel TV: Korean Zombie vs. Poirier. Jung defeated Poirier via submission in the fourth round. The performance earned Jung Submission of the Night and both participants Fight of the Night honors. The bout was honored as Fight of the Year and Submission of the Year by several publications at the conclusion of 2012. This fight was the first time that Jung walked out to the song Zombie by The Cranberries. He would use this for every fight thereafter.

Jung was expected to face Ricardo Lamas on July 6, 2013, at UFC 162. However, on June 14, it was announced that Jung had been pulled from the Lamas bout and would replace an injured Anthony Pettis to face José Aldo for the UFC Featherweight Championship on August 3, 2013, at UFC 163. Aldo defeated Jung via fourth-round TKO, finishing Jung with a flurry of strikes after Jung suffered a dislocated shoulder while throwing an overhand right.

Jung was expected to face Akira Corassani on October 4, 2014, at UFC Fight Night 53. However, Jung pulled out of the bout citing another injury and was replaced by Max Holloway.

Jung announced in mid-October 2014 his intention to begin his stint for mandatory military service in his home country of South Korea. While Jung did not comment about the future upon his completion, his manager indicated that he would return to mixed martial arts at the end of the two years.

In mid 2016, Jung attended Rener Gracie's inaugural Korean Super Seminar in Seoul.

Jung faced Dennis Bermudez on February 4, 2017, at UFC Fight Night 104. He won the fight by knockout in the first round. The win also won Jung his first Performance of the Night bonus award.

Jung was expected to face Ricardo Lamas on July 29, 2017, at UFC 214. However, Jung pulled out of the fight in early June citing a knee injury. He was replaced by Jason Knight.

Jung was expected to face Frankie Edgar on November 10, 2018 at UFC Fight Night 139. However, it was reported on October 26, 2018 that Edgar was pulled from the bout due to injury and he was replaced by Yair Rodríguez. He lost the fight via knockout in the final second of the fifth round. Both participants received Fight of the Night honors.

Jung faced Renato Moicano on June 22, 2019 at UFC Fight Night 154. He won the fight via technical knockout in 58 seconds of the first round. This fight earned him the Performance of the Night award.

Jung was scheduled to face Brian Ortega on December 21, 2019 at UFC Fight Night 165. However, Ortega pulled out of the fight in early December citing a knee injury and he was replaced by Frankie Edgar. Jung won the fight via TKO in the first round. The win also earned Jung a Performance of the Night bonus award.

The bout against Brian Ortega was rescheduled on October 18, 2020 at UFC Fight Night 180. He lost the fight via unanimous decision.

Jung faced Dan Ige on June 19, 2021 at UFC on ESPN 25. He won the fight via unanimous decision. Following the fight, Jung was promoted to the rank of black belt in Brazilian Jiu Jitsu.

Jung challenged for the UFC Featherweight Championship for a second time against Alexander Volkanovski at UFC 273 on April 9, 2022. After being out struck and knocked down multiple times throughout the fight, Jung lost the fight via TKO early in round four.

For the last time in his MMA career, Jung faced Max Holloway on August 26, 2023 at UFC Fight Night 225. Jung would go on to lose to Holloway via third round KO and subsequently announced his retirement after the fight. This bout earned the fighters a Fight of the Night award.

== Championships and accomplishments ==
=== Mixed martial arts ===
- Ultimate Fighting Championship
  - Submission of the Night (Two times) vs. Leonard Garcia and Dustin Poirier
  - Knockout of the Night (One time) vs. Mark Hominick
  - Fight of the Night (Three times) vs. Dustin Poirier, Yair Rodríguez and Max Holloway
  - Performance of the Night (Three times) vs. Dennis Bermudez, Renato Moicano, and Frankie Edgar
    - Tied (Yair Rodriguez) for third most Post-Fight bonuses in the UFC Featherweight division history (9)
  - Fastest finish in UFC Featherweight division history (0:07 vs Mark Hominick)
    - Fastest knockout in UFC Featherweight division history (0:07 vs Mark Hominick)
  - First fighter in UFC history to finish with a Twister submission.
  - UFC.com Awards
    - 2011: Ranked #2 Submission of the Year vs. Leonard Garcia, Half-Year Awards: Best Submission of the 1HY vs. Leonard Garcia, Ranked #6 Import of the Year & Ranked #8 Knockout of the Year vs. Mark Hominick
    - 2012: Submission of the Year vs. Dustin Poirier, Half-Year Awards: Best Fight of the 1HY & Ranked #2 Fight of the Year vs. Dustin Poirier
    - 2018: Ranked #3 Fight of the Year vs. Yair Rodriguez
- World Extreme Cagefighting
  - Fight of the Night (One time) vs. Leonard Garcia
- KoreaFC
  - Korea FC 65 kg Tournament Winner
- Pancrase
  - Pancrase Korea Neo-Blood Lightweight Tournament Winner
- Wrestling Observer Newsletter
  - 2010 Fight of the Year vs. Leonard Garcia at WEC 48
  - 2012 Fight of the Year vs. Dustin Poirier at UFC on Fuel TV 3
- World MMA Awards
  - 2011 Submission of the Year vs. Leonard Garcia 2 at UFC Fight Night: Nogueira vs. Davis
- MMA Fighting
  - 2012 Fight of the Year vs. Dustin Poirier at UFC on Fuel TV 3
- ESPN
  - 2012 Fight of the Year vs. Dustin Poirier at UFC on Fuel TV 3
  - 2023 Best Non-Fight Moment: Korean Zombie's Last Walkout at UFC Singapore
- Bleacher Report
  - 2012 Fight of the Year vs. Dustin Poirier at UFC on Fuel TV 3
  - 2018 Fight of the Year vs. Yair Rodríguez at UFC Fight Night 139
- Sherdog
  - 2012 Fight of the Year vs. Dustin Poirier at UFC on Fuel TV 3
  - 2011 All-Violence First Team
- Inside MMA
  - 2011 Submission of the Year Bazzie Award vs. Leonard Garcia 2 at UFC Fight Night: Nogueira vs. Davis
- Bloody Elbow
  - 2012 Fight of the Year vs. Dustin Poirier at UFC on Fuel TV 3
- FIGHT! Magazine
  - 2012 Fight of the Year vs. Dustin Poirier at UFC on Fuel TV 3
- CBS Sports
  - 2018 #3 Ranked UFC Fight of the Year vs. Yair Rodríguez at UFC Fight Night: The Korean Zombie vs. Rodríguez

== Personal life ==
Jung has two daughters and one son. In 2014, he married his longtime girlfriend Park Sun Young.

== Filmography ==
=== Television series ===
Year	Title	Role	Notes	Ref.
2024	Flex X Cop	himself	Cameo (episode 1)	

=== Television shows ===
Year	Title	Role	Notes	Ref.
2022–2023	Fighter	Mentor		

=== Music video appearances ===
Year	Song Title	Artist	Ref.
2021	"Lipstick"	Lee Hi (Feat. Yoon Mirae)	

== Mixed martial arts record ==
Professional record breakdown
25 matches	17 wins	8 losses
By knockout	6	5
By submission	8	0
By decision	3	3

Res.	Record	Opponent	Method	Event	Date	Round	Time	Location	Notes
Loss	17–8	Max Holloway	KO (punch)	UFC Fight Night: Holloway vs. The Korean Zombie	August 26, 2023	3	0:23	Kallang, Singapore	Fight of the Night.
Loss	17–7	Alexander Volkanovski	TKO (punches)	UFC 273	April 9, 2022	4	0:45	Jacksonville, Florida, United States	For the UFC Featherweight Championship.
Win	17–6	Dan Ige	Decision (unanimous)	UFC on ESPN: The Korean Zombie vs. Ige	June 19, 2021	5	5:00	Las Vegas, Nevada, United States	
Loss	16–6	Brian Ortega	Decision (unanimous)	UFC Fight Night: Ortega vs. The Korean Zombie	October 18, 2020	5	5:00	Abu Dhabi, United Arab Emirates	
Win	16–5	Frankie Edgar	TKO (punches)	UFC Fight Night: Edgar vs. The Korean Zombie	December 21, 2019	1	3:18	Busan, South Korea	Performance of the Night.
Win	15–5	Renato Moicano	TKO (punches)	UFC Fight Night: Moicano vs. The Korean Zombie	June 22, 2019	1	0:58	Greenville, South Carolina, United States	Performance of the Night.
Loss	14–5	Yair Rodríguez	KO (elbow)	UFC Fight Night: The Korean Zombie vs. Rodríguez	November 10, 2018	5	4:59	Denver, Colorado, United States	Fight of the Night.
Win	14–4	Dennis Bermudez	KO (punch)	UFC Fight Night: Bermudez vs. The Korean Zombie	February 4, 2017	1	2:49	Houston, Texas, United States	Performance of the Night.
Loss	13–4	José Aldo	TKO (punches)	UFC 163	August 3, 2013	4	2:00	Rio de Janeiro, Brazil	For the UFC Featherweight Championship.
Win	13–3	Dustin Poirier	Technical Submission (brabo choke)	UFC on Fuel TV: The Korean Zombie vs. Poirier	May 15, 2012	4	1:07	Fairfax, Virginia, United States	Submission of the Night. Fight of the Night.
Win	12–3	Mark Hominick	KO (punches)	UFC 140	December 10, 2011	1	0:07	Toronto, Ontario, Canada	Knockout of the Night.
Win	11–3	Leonard Garcia	Submission (twister)	UFC Fight Night: Nogueira vs. Davis	March 26, 2011	2	4:59	Seattle, Washington, United States	Submission of the Night.
Loss	10–3	George Roop	KO (head kick)	WEC 51	September 30, 2010	2	1:30	Broomfield, Colorado, United States	
Loss	10–2	Leonard Garcia	Decision (split)	WEC 48	April 24, 2010	3	5:00	Sacramento, California, United States	Fight of the Night.
Win	10–1	Matt Jaggers	Submission (triangle choke)	World Victory Road Presents: Sengoku 9	August 2, 2009	2	1:25	Saitama, Japan	2009 Sengoku Featherweight Grand Prix Reserve bout.
Loss	9–1	Masanori Kanehara	Decision (unanimous)	World Victory Road Presents: Sengoku 8	May 2, 2009	3	5:00	Tokyo, Japan	2009 Sengoku Featherweight Grand Prix Quarterfinals.
Win	9–0	Shintaro Ishiwatari	Submission (rear-naked choke)	World Victory Road Presents: Sengoku 7	March 20, 2009	1	4:29	Tokyo, Japan	2009 Sengoku Featherweight Grand Prix 1st round.
Win	8–0	Fanjin Son	KO (punch)	Deep: 39 Impact	December 10, 2008	1	0:17	Okayama, Japan	
Win	7–0	Michihiro Omigawa	Decision (unanimous)	Deep: Gladiator	August 16, 2008	2	5:00	Okayama, Japan	
Win	6–0	Jung-Hun Cho	Decision (unanimous)	Korea FC	May 31, 2008	3	5:00	Gangwon Province, South Korea	Won the Korea FC 65 kg Tournament.
Win	5–0	Dae-Han Choi	Submission (triangle choke)	Korea FC	May 31, 2008	1	3:38	Gangwon Province, South Korea	Korea FC 65 kg Tournament Semifinal.
Win	4–0	Jung-Beom Choi	Submission (armbar)	Korea FC	May 31, 2008	1	2:15	Gangwon Province, South Korea	Featherweight debut. Korea FC 65 kg Tournament Quarterfinal.
Win	3–0	Hyung-Geol Lee	TKO (punches)	Pancrase: 2007 Korea Neo-Blood Tournament	December 16, 2007	1	3:27	Busan, South Korea	Won the Pancrase Korea Neo-Blood Lightweight Tournament.
Win	2–0	In-Seok Yoo	Submission (rear-naked choke)	Pancrase: 2007 Korea Neo-Blood Tournament	December 16, 2007	1	2:34	Busan, South Korea	Pancrase Korea Neo-Blood Lightweight Tournament Semifinal.
Win	1–0	Hyung-Geol Lee	Submission (armbar)	Super Sambo Festival	June 24, 2007	2	3:07	Gyeongju, South Korea	Lightweight debut.

== Pay-per-view bouts ==
No	Event	Fight	Date	Venue	City	PPV buys
1.	UFC 163	Aldo vs. Korean Zombie	August 3, 2013	HSBC Arena	Rio de Janeiro, Brazil	180,000
2.	UFC 273	Volkanovski vs. Korean Zombie	April 9, 2022	VyStar Veterans Memorial Arena	Jacksonville, Florida, United States	Not Disclosed

== Awards and nominations ==
Name of the award ceremony, year presented, category, nominee of the award, and the result of the nomination
Award ceremony	Year	Category	Nominee / Work	Result	Ref.
Blue Dragon Series Awards	2022	Best New Male Entertainer	Fighter Club	Nominated	

== See also ==
- List of male mixed martial artists
