= Josh Grispi =

American mixed martial arts fighter

- Born: Josh Richard Grispi; October 14, 1988 (age 38); Boston, Massachusetts, United States
- Other names: The Fluke
- Height: 5 ft 11 in (1.80 m)
- Weight: 145 lb (66 kg; 10.4 st)
- Division: Featherweight
- Reach: 74.0 in (188 cm)
- Fighting out of: Rockland, Massachusetts, United States
- Team: South Shore Sportfighting
- Years active: 2006–2014

Mixed martial arts record
- Total: 19
- Wins: 14
- By knockout: 6
- By submission: 7
- By decision: 1
- Losses: 5
- By knockout: 1
- By submission: 2
- By decision: 2

Other information
- Spouse: Sabrina Grispi
- Mixed martial arts record from Sherdog
- Last updated on: June 18, 2017

Josh Richard Grispi (born October 14, 1988) is an American former professional mixed martial artist. A professional competitor from 2006 until 2014, he has competed for the UFC and WEC.

== Background ==
Grispi, a talented hockey player, was kicked out of many schools and even a paintball facility before venturing into mixed martial arts when he was 13 years old, following the advice of his father. Grispi went to South Shore Sportfighting. The sport grew on Grispi, and he began fighting in New Hampshire and Massachusetts, winning local tournaments while often being the youngest competitor.

== Mixed martial arts career ==
=== World Extreme Cagefighting ===
After beginning his career in 2006 and going 10–1 in smaller promotions, Grispi was signed by the WEC.

He made his promotional debut against Mark Hominick at WEC 32, locking in a rear-naked choke submission in the first round. This was followed up by an early first round TKO victory over Micah Miller.

His next fight came against former UFC Lightweight Champion Jens Pulver at WEC 41 on June 7, 2009. He won the fight via guillotine choke submission 33 seconds into the fight. Two days before the Pulver fight, Grispi injured his ankle while training, but agreed to fight anyway. He underwent surgery and returned in the summer of 2010.

Grispi returned after a year off to face LC Davis on June 20, 2010, at WEC 49. Grispi submitted Davis by guillotine choke submission at 2:33 of the first round, earning Submission of the Night honors.

=== Ultimate Fighting Championship ===
Grispi was expected to face Erik Koch on November 11, 2010, at WEC 52. However, in October 2010, World Extreme Cagefighting merged with the Ultimate Fighting Championship. As part of the merger, all WEC fighters were transferred to the UFC.

He was expected to fight José Aldo at UFC 125 for the UFC Featherweight Championship but Aldo was forced to withdraw due to injury. Risking his #1 contender status, Grispi instead fought late replacement Dustin Poirier at the event and lost via unanimous decision. Grispi suffered a jaw injury in the fight which sidelined him for 5 months.

Grispi faced George Roop on June 4, 2011, at The Ultimate Fighter 13 Finale. He lost the fight via TKO in the third round.

Grispi was expected to face Matt Grice on October 8, 2011, at UFC 136. However, Grispi was forced from the bout and replaced by Nam Phan.

Grispi was expected to face Pablo Garza on August 4, 2012, at UFC on FOX 4. However, Garza was forced out of the bout and replaced by Rani Yahya. Grispi lost to Yahya after he tapped out to a north–south choke in the first round.

Grispi faced Andy Ogle on February 16, 2013, at UFC on Fuel TV: Barão vs. McDonald. Grispi lost the fight via unanimous decision and was subsequently released from the promotion.

=== Post-UFC career ===
After serving his sentence in jail, Grispi has returned to the mixed martial arts and was expected to face Bruce Boyington for NEF Lightweight Championship at NEF 42 on February 8, 2020. However on January 20, 2020, news surfaced that Grispi was forced to withdraw from the bout due to legal complications and was replaced by Manny Bermudez.

== Personal life ==
Grispi filed for divorce while incarcerated and has a son and a daughter with ex wife Kaitlyn. He is a distant relative of legendary boxer Rocky Marciano. Aside from fighting, Grispi used to do construction work with his father.

== Legal issues ==
On August 6, 2014, Grispi was held without bail on domestic abuse and assault charges against his wife. Grispi had first been arrested on August 1, 2014, and charged with multiple counts of improperly storing firearms near minors, as well as assault and battery on his wife. However, Grispi was released on August 4, 2014, after posting $2,000 bail. That same day, Grispi allegedly assaulted his wife again by punching and kicking her repeatedly, as well as sending his bull terrier dog who had been trained to attack her after her. However, his wife was able to escape and reach a neighbor's house to receive help. The neighbor then called police to report the assault. The police searched Grispi's house and found 20 marijuana plants and 15 grams of cocaine. Grispi's wife told police her husband had been abusive to her for the past two years in their three-year marriage. One officer described the event as "the worst case of domestic abuse I've ever seen." On June 16, 2017, Grispi was convicted on 25 of 29 charges in Plymouth County Superior Court in Brockton, Massachusetts. He received a sentence of 5 1/2 years of incarceration and 5 years of probation upon release. Several charges, such as witness intimidation and witness tampering, related to behavior while incarcerated and awaiting trial, were added.

== Championships and accomplishments ==
- World Extreme Cagefighting
  - Submission of the Night (One time) vs. LC Davis (technical guillotine choke)

== Mixed martial arts record ==
Professional record breakdown
19 matches	14 wins	5 losses
By knockout	6	1
By submission	7	2
By decision	1	2

Res.	Record	Opponent	Method	Event	Date	Round	Time	Location	Notes
Loss	14–5	Andy Ogle	Decision (unanimous)	UFC on Fuel TV: Barão vs. McDonald	February 16, 2013	3	5:00	London, England, United Kingdom	
Loss	14–4	Rani Yahya	Submission (north/south choke)	UFC on Fox: Shogun vs. Vera	August 4, 2012	1	3:15	Los Angeles, California, United States	
Loss	14–3	George Roop	TKO (body punch)	The Ultimate Fighter 13 Finale	June 4, 2011	3	3:14	Las Vegas, Nevada, United States	
Loss	14–2	Dustin Poirier	Decision (unanimous)	UFC 125	January 1, 2011	3	5:00	Las Vegas, Nevada, United States	
Win	14–1	LC Davis	Technical submission (guillotine choke)	WEC 49	June 20, 2010	1	2:33	Edmonton, Alberta, Canada	Submission of the Night.
Win	13–1	Jens Pulver	Submission (guillotine choke)	WEC 41	June 7, 2009	1	0:33	Sacramento, California, United States	
Win	12–1	Micah Miller	TKO (punches)	WEC 35: Condit vs. Miura	August 3, 2008	1	0:50	Las Vegas, Nevada, United States	
Win	11–1	Mark Hominick	Technical submission (rear-naked choke)	WEC 32: Condit vs. Prater	February 18, 2008	1	2:55	Rio Rancho, New Mexico, United States	
Win	10–1	Spencer Paige	KO (head kick)	FFP: Untamed 18	December 15, 2007	1	0:11	Plymouth, Massachusetts, United States	
Win	9–1	Paul Gorman	Submission (triangle choke)	FFP: Untamed 14	June 16, 2007	1	2:29	Plymouth, Massachusetts, United States	
Win	8–1	Glen Medeiras	KO (punches)	RF: Domination	April 28, 2007	1	0:40	Concord, New Hampshire, United States	
Win	7–1	Charlie Murphy	Submission (armbar)	WFL 16: Moment of Truth 2	March 31, 2007	1	N/A	Revere, Massachusetts, United States	
Win	6–1	Fernando Bernandino	Decision (majority)	FFP: Untamed 10	March 10, 2007	3	5:00	Plymouth, Massachusetts, United States	
Win	5–1	Edward Odquina	Submission (armbar)	WFL 15: Winter Brawl 2007	February 3, 2007	1	1:11	Revere, Massachusetts, United States	
Loss	4–1	Henrique Bilcalho	Submission (heel hook)	CZ 19: Above and Beyond	December 2, 2006	1	1:32	Revere, Massachusetts, United States	
Win	4–0	Eddie Felix	TKO (punches)	FFP: Untamed 8	November 18, 2006	1	0:49	Mansfield, Massachusetts, United States	
Win	3–0	Cylde Ganthier	KO (punches)	WFL 12: Calloway Cup 3	October 28, 2006	1	N/A	Revere, Massachusetts, United States	
Win	2–0	Dan Bonnell	Submission (guillotine choke)	CZ 18	October 14, 2006	1	0:27	Revere, Massachusetts, United States	
Win	1–0	Nick Zimmerman	TKO (punches)	RF: Invasion	September 26, 2006	1	0:18	Manchester, New Hampshire, United States	

== See also ==
- List of male mixed martial artists
