= Akira Corassani =

Swedish mixed martial arts fighter (born 1982)

- Born: Hamid Khorassani; August 27, 1982 (age 44); Lund, Sweden
- Nationality: Swedish
- Height: 5 ft 8 in (1.73 m)
- Weight: 145 lb (66 kg; 10.4 st)
- Division: Featherweight (2012-2015); Lightweight (2008-2011); Welterweight (2007); Light heavyweight (2007)
- Reach: 68 in (173 cm)
- Stance: Orthodox
- Fighting out of: New York City, New York
- Team: Redline Training Center; Renzo Gracie Combat Team
- Rank: Black on red belt in Taekwondo; Purple belt in Brazilian jiu-jitsu
- Years active: 2007–2015

Mixed martial arts record
- Total: 19
- Wins: 12
- By knockout: 1
- By submission: 3
- By decision: 7
- By disqualification: 1
- Losses: 6
- By knockout: 6
- No contests: 1

Amateur record
- Total: 3
- Wins: 3
- By decision: 3

Other information
- Mixed martial arts record from Sherdog

Hamid Khorassani (Persian: حمید خراسانی; born August 27, 1982), professionally known as Akira Corassani, is a Swedish former professional mixed martial artist who most recently competed in the Featherweight division of the Ultimate Fighting Championship (UFC). A professional MMA competitor since 2007, Corassani has made a name for himself fighting mainly in Western Europe. He was a competitor on Spike TV's The Ultimate Fighter: Team Bisping vs. Team Miller as a member of Team Bisping.

== Background ==
Corassani was born in Lund, southern Sweden, to an Iranian-Azerbaijani family. His parents moved to Sweden from Iran around 1976. He began martial arts when he was six years old, Shotokan Karate became his discipline for 1 year until he switched over to Tae Kwon Do. He was playing football in his hometown team as well as pursuing his black belt in Tae Kwon Do. Corassani graduated fast and was considered a natural talent early on. At the age of 14 he became a Tae Kwon Do black belt to shortly after quit and pursue his football journey. Football became his main focus in life as he played in the highest youth league in Sweden. At the age of 22 Corassani found his way back to martial arts and he began training MMA. Corassani comes from an academic family and has four sibling who are all doctors. Corassani is vegan. Corassani speaks seven different languages: Swedish, English, Spanish, Portuguese, Persian, Azeri and Turkish.

== Career ==
=== Early career ===
In 2005 Corassani started training at a local MMA gym in Gothenburg where he lived at the time. He decided to dedicate his life to martial arts and only four months later he competed in his first grappling tournament where he took a silver medal. Up until his professional debut Corassani had 30 grappling matches and 12 boxing fights. Corassani began fighting professionally in 2007, and traveling all across Europe to compete. In his professional debut fight he challenged the Dutch heavyweight fighter Dion Staring. Corassani had travelled to Holland to corner his friend but heard about Straing's opponent pulling out. Corassani stepped up on the scale as 76 kg as his opponent weighed 102 kg. The fight was titled as an open weight fight. He built a record of 9–3 (1 NC) beating good names before his UFC debut. He moved to New York in 2011 and was a part of Team Renzo Gracie. In US he joined their MMA team coached by Ricardo Almeida with teammates such as Frankie Edgar, Edson Barboza, Eddie Alvarez, Corey Anderson and Marlon Moraes.

=== The Ultimate Fighter ===
In 2011, Corassani had signed with the UFC to compete on The Ultimate Fighter: Team Bisping vs. Team Miller. In the first episode, Corassani fought Brian Pearman to gain entry into the Ultimate Fighter house. Corassani defeated Pearman in the first round via KO. Corassani was selected as a part of Team Bisping, he was the second featherweight chosen for the team (fifth overall).

In episodes three through five, Corassani was shown multiple times in altercations with Team Mayhem fighter, Dustin Neace. The two would later be paired in a bout against each other in the preliminary round. During the fight, inside the first round, Neace applied a heel hook submission that looked like Corassani tapped to; however referee Herb Dean did not stop the fight and Corassani was released from the hold. Corassani went on to defeat Neace via a majority decision after two rounds. After the win Corassani moved onto the semi-finals.

Corassani was chosen to fight Team Mayhem fighter, Dennis Bermudez, in the semi-final round. The fight would determine who would move into the final round of the featherweight tournament. Though Corassani controlled throughout the fight with effective striking, scoring several knockdowns, Corassani lost the fight via submission (guillotine choke) in the first round. When the referee stopped the fight Akira had lost consciousness and had to be told that he lost the fight.

=== Ultimate Fighting Championship ===
Though Corassani lost in the semi-final round, and did not win the show, he signed an exclusive deal with the UFC. He was set to make his debut on December 3, 2011, at The Ultimate Fighter 14 Finale against Steven Siler. However, after an injury in training camp, Corassani was forced to pull out of the bout and was replaced by newcomer Josh Clopton.

Corassani was expected to make his UFC debut in his native Sweden against Jason Young on April 14, 2012, at UFC on Fuel TV 2. However Corassani pulled out of the bout due to injury.

Corassani won his UFC debut via split decision against Andy Ogle on September 29, 2012, at UFC on Fuel TV 5.

A bout with Robbie Peralta, previously linked to UFC 156, was moved April 6, 2013, at UFC on Fuel TV 9, after an illness sidelined Corassani for a time. He won the fight by unanimous decision.

Corassani was expected to face Mike Brown on August 17, 2013, at UFC Fight Night 26. However, Corassani pulled out of the bout due to an injury and was replaced by Steven Siler.

Corassani faced Maximo Blanco on November 30, 2013, at The Ultimate Fighter 18 Finale. Early in the opening round Blanco landed an illegal knee to the head of Corassani when he had a knee and hand on the ground. Corassani was unable to continue, so he was rendered with the victory by disqualification. It was later revealed that the illegal knee had broken his nose in five different places.

Corassani faced Dustin Poirier at The Ultimate Fighter Nations Finale. He lost the back-and-forth fight via TKO in the second round. He was awarded his first Fight of the Night bonus for his efforts.

Corassani was expected to face Chan Sung Jung on October 4, 2014, at UFC Fight Night 53. However, Jung pulled out of the bout citing a strained shoulder. and was replaced by Max Holloway. Corassani lost the fight via knockout in the first round.

Corassani fought Sam Sicilia on January 24, 2015, at UFC on Fox: Gustafsson vs. Johnson. He lost the fight via KO in the first round.

On January 26, 2015, Corassani announced his retirement from MMA on his Facebook page, finishing with a 3–3 record inside the UFC.

== Championships and accomplishments ==
- Ultimate Fighting Championship
  - Fight of the Night (One time) vs. Dustin Poirier
- MMAJunkie.com
  - 2014 April Fight of the Month vs. Dustin Poirier

== Mixed martial arts record ==
Professional record breakdown
19 matches	12 wins	6 losses
By knockout	1	6
By submission	3	0
By decision	7	0
By disqualification	1	0
No contests	1	

Res.	Record	Opponent	Method	Event	Date	Round	Time	Location	Notes
Loss	12–6 (1)	Sam Sicilia	KO (punch)	UFC on Fox: Gustafsson vs. Johnson	January 24, 2015	1	3:26	Stockholm, Sweden	
Loss	12–5 (1)	Max Holloway	KO (punches)	UFC Fight Night: Nelson vs. Story	October 4, 2014	1	3:11	Stockholm, Sweden	
Loss	12–4 (1)	Dustin Poirier	TKO (punches)	The Ultimate Fighter Nations Finale: Bisping vs. Kennedy	April 16, 2014	2	0:42	Quebec City, Quebec, Canada	Fight of the Night.
Win	12–3 (1)	Maximo Blanco	DQ (illegal knee)	The Ultimate Fighter 18 Finale	November 30, 2013	1	0:25	Las Vegas, Nevada, United States	An illegal knee rendered Corassani unable to continue.
Win	11–3 (1)	Robbie Peralta	Decision (unanimous)	UFC on Fuel TV: Mousasi vs. Latifi	April 6, 2013	3	5:00	Stockholm, Sweden	
Win	10–3 (1)	Andy Ogle	Decision (split)	UFC on Fuel TV: Struve vs. Miocic	September 29, 2012	3	5:00	Nottingham, England	Featherweight debut.
Loss	9–3 (1)	Paul Reed	TKO (punches)	The Zone FC 8	February 26, 2011	2	3:28	Gothenburg, Sweden	
Win	9–2 (1)	Graham Turner	Decision (unanimous)	Superior Challenge 6	October 29, 2010	3	5:00	Stockholm, Sweden	
Win	8–2 (1)	Martin Begley	Submission (scissor choke)	Vision Fighting Championship 1	August 28, 2010	1	4:28	Karlstad Municipality, Sweden	
Win	7–2 (1)	Ivan Buchinger	Decision (unanimous)	Battle of Botnia 2	December 12, 2009	3	5:00	Umeå, Sweden	
Win	6–2 (1)	Peter Mettler	TKO (punches)	Superior Challenge 4	October 31, 2009	1	3:42	Stockholm, Sweden	
NC	5–2 (1)	Felipe Enomoto	No Contest (overturned)	Gods of War 5: Empathy	September 12, 2009	3	5:00	Baumholder, Germany	Originally a decision for Enomoto, result overturned.
Win	5–2	Dominique Stetefeld	Submission (arm-triangle choke)	La Onda Fight Night 2	May 23, 2009	3	5:00	Magdeburg, Germany	
Win	4–2	Grzegorz Tredowski	Decision (unanimous)	United Glory 10: The Battle of Arnhem	November 9, 2008	3	5:00	Arnhem, Netherlands	
Loss	3–2	Darin Hughes	TKO (punches)	Superior Challenge 1	April 5, 2008	2	4:10	Stockholm, Sweden	Lightweight debut.
Win	3–1	Jukka Kuitunen	Decision (unanimous)	Shooto Finland: Chicago Collision III	November 17, 2007	2	5:00	Lahti, Finland	
Win	2–1	Raymond Jarman	Submission (triangle choke)	United Glory 5: Stronger	September 9, 2007	2	N/A	Amersfoort, Netherlands	
Win	1–1	Jaroslav Poborsky	Decision (unanimous)	Gods of War 1: Rise of the Warriors	July 28, 2007	3	5:00	Erdesbach, Germany	Welterweight debut.
Loss	0–1	Dion Staring	TKO (corner stoppage)	United Glory 3: Upside Down	May 20, 2007	2	2:52	Amersfoort, Netherlands	Light Heavyweight bout.

=== Mixed martial arts exhibition record ===
Exhibition record breakdown		
3 matches	2 wins	1 loss
By knockout	1	0
By submission	0	1
By decision	1	0

Res.	Record	Opponent	Method	Event	Date	Round	Time	Location	Notes
Loss	2–1	Dennis Bermudez	Submission (guillotine choke)	The Ultimate Fighter: Team Bisping vs. Team Miller		1	3:12	Las Vegas, Nevada, United States	Semi-finals.
Win	2–0	Dustin Neace	Decision (majority)	The Ultimate Fighter: Team Bisping vs. Team Miller		2	5:00	Las Vegas, Nevada, United States	Quarter-finals.
Win	1–0	Brian Pearman	KO (punches)	The Ultimate Fighter: Team Bisping vs. Team Miller		1	4:17	Las Vegas, Nevada, United States	Preliminary bout.

== Amateur mixed martial arts record ==
Amateur record breakdown		
3 matches	3 wins	0 losses
By decision	3	0

Res.	Record	Opponent	Method	Event	Date	Round	Time	Location	Notes
Win	3–0	Henrik Olsen	Decision (unanimous)	Shooters MMA: Frederikssund Brawl 2	May 27, 2006	3	5:00	Frederikssund, Denmark	
Win	2–0	Arash Dastnai	Decision (unanimous)	Shooters MMA: Fightergalla 2	October 22, 2005	3	5:00	Odense, Denmark	
Win	1–0	Arild Skagseth	Decision (unanimous)	Cage Challenge 2	June 4, 2005	1	5:00	Stockholm, Sweden	
