= UFC Fight Night: Shogun vs. Sonnen =

UFC mixed martial arts event in 2013

- The poster for UFC Fight Night: Shogun vs. Sonnen
- Promotion: Ultimate Fighting Championship
- Date: August 17, 2013
- Venue: TD Garden
- City: Boston, Massachusetts
- Attendance: 14,181
- Total gate: $1,534,000

Event chronology
UFC 163: Aldo vs. Korean Zombie	UFC Fight Night: Shogun vs. Sonnen	UFC Fight Night: Condit vs. Kampmann 2

UFC Fight Night: Shogun vs. Sonnen (also known as UFC Fight Night 26) was a mixed martial arts event held on August 17, 2013, at the TD Garden in Boston.

== Background ==
The event was the first UFC event broadcast on Fox Sports 1.

The main event was contested between former UFC Light Heavyweight Champion Maurício Rua and Chael Sonnen. The bout was first linked to UFC 161, as Sonnen was mentioned as a short notice replacement for Rua's original opponent Antônio Rogério Nogueira, who was out of the bout with a back injury. Visa issues prevented Sonnen from getting into Canada, resulting in Rua being pulled from the event altogether.

Nick Ring was expected to face Uriah Hall at the event. However, Ring was pulled from the bout and was replaced by Josh Samman Samman was subsequently forced from the bout and was replaced by returning UFC fighter John Howard.

Akira Corassani was expected to face Mike Brown at the event; however, Corassani pulled out of the bout and was replaced by Steven Siler.

Thiago Alves was expected to face Matt Brown at the event; however, Alves pulled out of the bout citing an injury and was replaced by Mike Pyle.

Andy Ogle was expected to face Conor McGregor at the event; however, Ogle pulled out of the bout citing an injury and was replaced by Max Holloway.

== Results ==
Main card (Fox Sports 1)
Weight class				Method	Round	Time	Notes
Light Heavyweight	Chael Sonnen	def.	Maurício Rua	Submission (guillotine choke)	1	4:47
Heavyweight	Travis Browne	def.	Alistair Overeem	KO (front kick and punches)	1	4:08
Bantamweight	Urijah Faber	def.	Iuri Alcântara	Decision (unanimous) (30–26, 30–26, 30–27)	3	5:00
Welterweight	Matt Brown	def.	Mike Pyle	KO (punches)	1	0:29
Middleweight	John Howard	def.	Uriah Hall	Decision (split) (30–27, 28–29, 29–28)	3	5:00
Lightweight	Michael Johnson	def.	Joe Lauzon	Decision (unanimous) (30–27, 30–27, 30–25)	3	5:00
Preliminary card (Fox Sports 1)
Bantamweight	Michael McDonald	def.	Brad Pickett	Submission (triangle choke)	2	3:43
Featherweight	Conor McGregor	def.	Max Holloway	Decision (unanimous) (30–27, 30–27, 30–26)	3	5:00
Featherweight	Steven Siler	def.	Mike Brown	KO (punches)	1	0:50
Featherweight	Diego Brandao	def.	Daniel Pineda	Decision (unanimous) (29–28, 29–28, 29–28)	3	5:00
Preliminary card (Facebook/YouTube)
Featherweight	Manvel Gamburyan	def.	Cole Miller	Decision (unanimous) (30–27, 29–28, 29–28)	3	5:00
Light Heavyweight	Ovince Saint Preux	def.	Cody Donovan	KO (punches)	1	2:07
Lightweight	James Vick	def.	Ramsey Nijem	Submission (guillotine choke)	1	0:58

== Bonus awards ==
The following fighters received $50,000 bonuses.

- Fight of The Night: Michael McDonald vs. Brad Pickett
- Knockout of The Night: Travis Browne and Matt Brown
- Submission of the Night: Michael McDonald and Chael Sonnen

== Reported payout ==
The following is the reported payout to the fighters as reported to the Massachusetts State Athletic Commission. It does not include sponsor money or "locker room" bonuses often given by the UFC and also do not include the UFC's traditional "fight night" bonuses.

- Chael Sonnen: $100,000 (no win bonus) def. Maurício Rua: $175,000
- Travis Browne: $48,000 (includes $24,000 win bonus) def. Alistair Overeem: $285,000
- Urijah Faber: $120,000 (includes $60,000 win bonus) def. Iuri Alcântara: $16,000
- Matt Brown: $66,000 (includes $33,000 win bonus) def. Mike Pyle: $45,000
- John Howard: $28,000 (includes $14,000 win bonus) def. Uriah Hall: $10,000
- Michael Johnson: $36,000 (includes $18,000 win bonus) def. Joe Lauzon: $27,000
- Michael McDonald: $30,000 (includes $15,000 win bonus) def. Brad Pickett: $23,000
- Conor McGregor: $24,000 (includes $12,000 win bonus) def. Max Holloway: $14,000
- Steven Siler: $20,000 (includes $10,000 win bonus) def. Mike Brown: $30,000
- Diego Brandao: $40,000 (includes $20,000 win bonus) def. Daniel Pineda: $15,000
- Manvel Gamburyan: $40,000 (includes $20,000 win bonus) def. Cole Miller: $26,000
- Ovince St. Preux: $46,000 (includes $23,000 win bonus) def. Cody Donovan $8,000
- James Vick: $16,000 (includes $8,000 win bonus) def. Ramsey Nijem: $14,000

== See also ==
- List of UFC events
- 2013 in UFC
