= UFC on Fuel TV: Barão vs. McDonald =

UFC mixed martial arts event in 2013

- The poster for UFC on Fuel TV: Barão vs. McDonald
- Promotion: Ultimate Fighting Championship
- Date: February 16, 2013
- Venue: Wembley Arena
- City: London, United Kingdom
- Attendance: 10,349
- Total gate: $1,300,000

Event chronology
UFC 156: Aldo vs. Edgar	UFC on Fuel TV: Barão vs. McDonald	UFC 157: Rousey vs. Carmouche

UFC on Fuel TV: Barão vs. McDonald (also known as UFC on Fuel TV 7) was a mixed martial arts event held by the Ultimate Fighting Championship on February 16, 2013, at Wembley Arena in London, United Kingdom.

== Background ==
Dennis Siver was expected to face Cub Swanson at the event; however, Siver was forced out of the bout, and was replaced by Dustin Poirier.

Justin Edwards was expected to face Gunnar Nelson at the event; however, Edwards was forced to pull out of the bout citing an injury, and was replaced by returning veteran Jorge Santiago.

== Results ==
Main Card (Fuel TV)
Weight class				Method	Round	Time	Notes
Bantamweight	Renan Barão (ic)	def.	Michael McDonald	Submission (arm-triangle choke)	4	3:57	(Note: For the interim UFC Bantamweight Championship.)
Featherweight	Cub Swanson	def.	Dustin Poirier	Decision (unanimous) (29–28, 30–27, 30–27)	3	5:00
Light Heavyweight	Jimi Manuwa	def.	Cyrille Diabaté	TKO (retirement)	1	5:00
Welterweight	Gunnar Nelson	def.	Jorge Santiago	Decision (unanimous) (29–28, 29–28, 30–27)	3	5:00
Light Heavyweight	James Te Huna	def.	Ryan Jimmo	Decision (unanimous) (29–27, 29–28, 29–28)	3	5:00
Welterweight	Matt Riddle	vs.	Che Mills	No Contest	3	5:00	(Note: Originally ruled a Split Decision (29-28, 28-29, 30-27) victory for Riddle, result overturned due to testing positive for a banned substance.)
Preliminary Card (Facebook and YouTube)
Lightweight	Renée Forte	def.	Terry Etim	Decision (unanimous) (29–28, 29–28, 30–27)	3	5:00
Lightweight	Danny Castillo	def.	Paul Sass	Decision (unanimous) (30–27, 30–27, 29–28)	3	5:00
Featherweight	Andy Ogle	def.	Josh Grispi	Decision (unanimous) (29–28, 29–28, 30–27)	3	5:00
Middleweight	Tom Watson	def.	Stanislav Nedkov	TKO (knees & punches)	2	4:42
Bantamweight	Vaughan Lee	def.	Motonobu Tezuka	Decision (unanimous) (30–27, 30–27, 30–27)	3	5:00
Flyweight	Phil Harris	def.	Ulysses Gomez	Decision (unanimous) (30–27, 30–27, 29–28)	3	5:00

== Bonus Awards ==
Fighters were awarded $50,000 bonuses.

- Fight of the Night: Tom Watson vs. Stanislav Nedkov
- Knockout of the Night: Tom Watson
- Submission of the Night: Renan Barão

== See also ==
- List of UFC events
- 2013 in UFC
