= Max Holloway =

American mixed martial artist (born 1991)

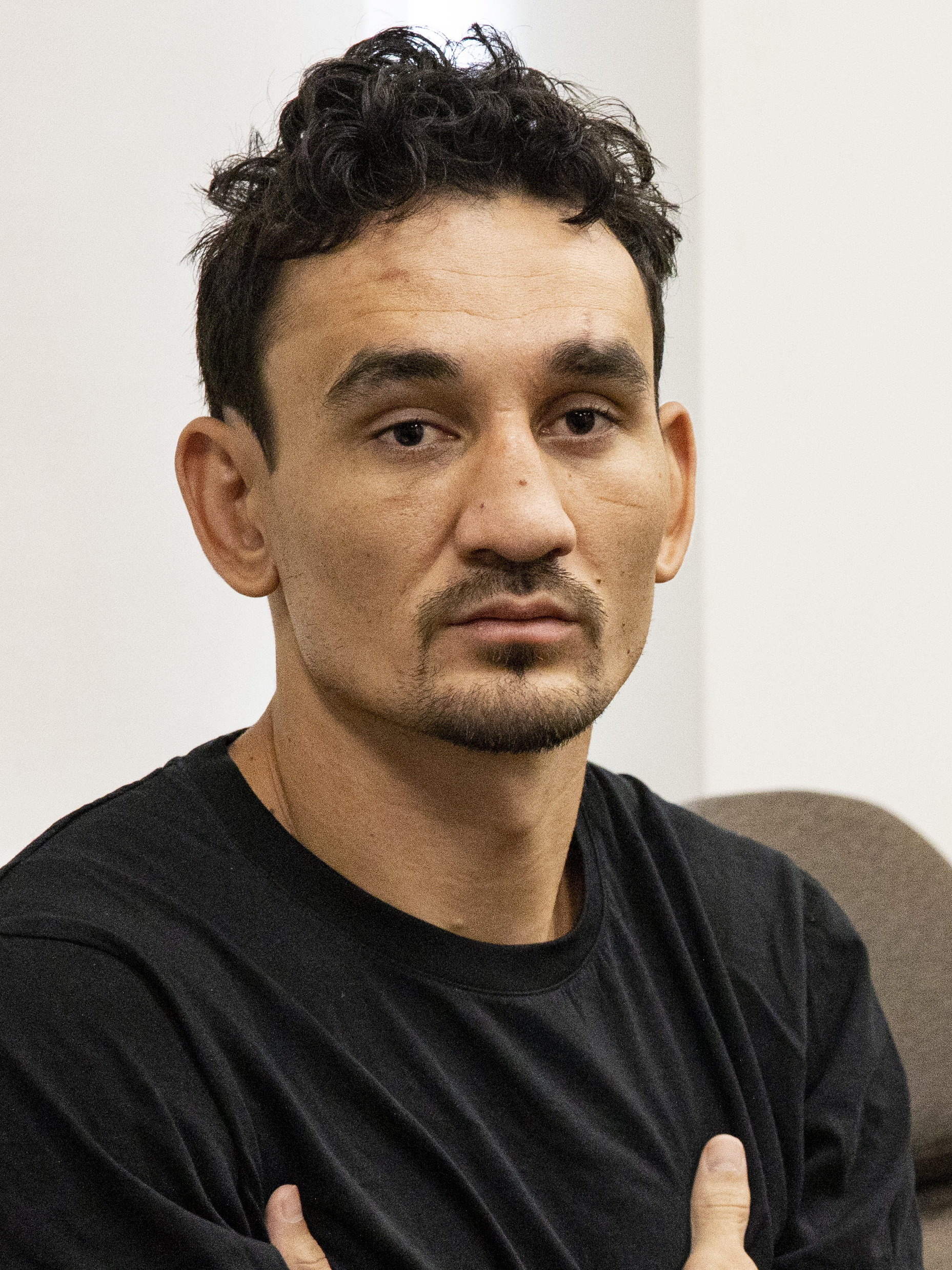
- Holloway at Marine Corps Base Hawaii in August 2022
- Born: Jerome Max Keliʻi Holloway; December 4, 1991 (age 34); Honolulu, Hawaii, U.S.
- Other names: Blessed
- Height: 5 ft 11 in (1.80 m)
- Weight: 170 lb (77 kg; 12 st 2 lb)
- Division: Featherweight (2012–2024); Lightweight (2010–2011, 2019, 2024-present); Welterweight (2026)
- Reach: 69 in (175 cm)
- Fighting out of: Waiʻanae, Hawaii, U.S.
- Team: Gracie Technics; Legacy Muay Thai
- Rank: Black belt in Brazilian Jiu-Jitsu under Pedro Sauer
- Years active: 2010–present

Mixed martial arts record
- Total: 37
- Wins: 28
- By knockout: 13
- By submission: 2
- By decision: 13
- Losses: 9
- By knockout: 1
- By submission: 1
- By decision: 7

Other information
- Mixed martial arts record from Sherdog

YouTube information
- Channel: Max Holloway
- Subscribers: 432 thousand
- Views: 37.6 million
- Last updated: July 3, 2026

Jerome Max Keliʻi Holloway (born December 4, 1991) is an American professional mixed martial artist. He currently competes in the Lightweight division of the Ultimate Fighting Championship (UFC), where he is a former UFC Featherweight Champion and former symbolic UFC "BMF" titleholder. He is considered one of the greatest Featherweights of all time. As of January 27, 2026, he is #4 in the Meta UFC lightweight rankings.

Holloway holds the UFC records for most significant strikes (3,681) and total strikes (3,980), with no other fighter within 1,000 of either mark. He also owns multiple UFC featherweight records, including most wins (20), longest winning streak (13), most finishes (11), and most knockout victories (9). Fight Matrix ranks him as the third-greatest featherweight of all time and the eighth-greatest pound-for-pound fighter in MMA history.

== Background ==
Holloway was born in Honolulu, Hawaii, and raised in Waiʻanae, an area known for fist fighting. He is of Native Hawaiian and Samoan descent. Holloway's parents were heavy drug users, his mother Missy Kapoi being a crystal meth consumer who later recovered. His father, Mark Holloway, who constantly abused his mother, left when Max was around 11 years old. Max started training in kickboxing in 2007 at the end of his sophomore year, aged 15, out of Team Ruthless, and went on to win his first amateur bout in the sport after three days of training. He graduated from Waiʻanae High School in 2010.

== Mixed martial arts career ==
=== Early MMA career ===
At the age of 19, Holloway had amassed a record of 4–0. He gained recognition as the #7 featherweight prospect of 2012 in Bloody Elbow's 2012 World MMA Scouting Report and was compared with former UFC and former WEC lightweight champion Anthony Pettis, due to his ability to incorporate a wide array of flying and spinning kicks, knees and elbows into his striking game. He would later go on to defeat Pettis to capture the UFC interim featherweight championship before unifying the title.

For the first four fights of his MMA career, Holloway went by the nickname "Lil Evil" as a homage to former UFC fighter Jens Pulver whose nickname was "Little Evil". He changed it to "Blessed" after a fan approached him and asked why he would use the word "evil" in his nickname.

His early career was highlighted by a split decision win over former Strikeforce and WEC veteran Harris Sarmiento on March 12, 2011, earning himself the lightweight strap for the Hawaii-based X-1 promotion.

=== Ultimate Fighting Championship ===
==== Early fights ====
Holloway was the youngest fighter on the UFC roster when he made his promotional debut as an injury replacement for Ricardo Lamas at UFC 143 on February 4, 2012, against Dustin Poirier. He lost the fight via submission (mounted triangle armbar) in the first round. In his second fight, Holloway faced Pat Schilling on June 1, 2012, at The Ultimate Fighter 15 Finale. Holloway won via unanimous decision (30–27, 30–27, 30–27).

Holloway defeated Justin Lawrence, on August 11, 2012, at UFC 150. Holloway won the fight via TKO in the second round. Holloway fought Leonard Garcia on December 29, 2012, at UFC 155, replacing an injured Cody McKenzie. Holloway won the close fight via split decision.

Holloway faced Dennis Bermudez on May 25, 2013, at UFC 160. He lost the fight controversially via split decision. 11 out of 11 media members scored the fight in favor of Holloway. Holloway faced Conor McGregor on August 17, 2013, at UFC Fight Night 26. He lost the fight via unanimous decision.

==== Win streak and title run ====
Holloway faced promotional newcomer Will Chope on January 4, 2014, at UFC Fight Night 34. Holloway won the fight via TKO in the second round. The win also earned Holloway his first Knockout of the Night bonus. Holloway faced Andre Fili on April 26, 2014, at UFC 172. He won the back-and-forth fight after submitting Fili in the third round.

Holloway was expected to face Mirsad Bektić on August 23, 2014, at UFC Fight Night 49, replacing an injured Ernest Chavez. However, Bektic pulled out of the bout in the week leading up to the event and was replaced by promotional newcomer Clay Collard. Holloway won the fight via TKO in the third round. Holloway again served as a replacement and faced Akira Corassani on October 4, 2014, at UFC Fight Night 53, filling in for Chan Sung Jung. He won the fight via knockout in the first round. The win earned Holloway his first Performance of the Night bonus award.

Holloway faced Cole Miller on February 15, 2015, at UFC Fight Night 60. Holloway won via unanimous decision. Holloway faced Cub Swanson on April 18, 2015, at UFC on Fox 15. Holloway finished the fight with a mounted guillotine in the third round. The win also earned Holloway his second Performance of the Night bonus award.

Holloway faced Charles Oliveira on August 23, 2015, at UFC Fight Night 74. He won the fight via TKO in the first round after Oliveira suffered an apparent neck/shoulder injury while defending a takedown and was unable to continue. The injury was later described as a micro-tear in his esophagus, although the UFC later released a statement clarifying that Oliveira had no major injuries. With the win, Holloway became the youngest fighter in UFC history to get 10 wins.

Holloway faced Jeremy Stephens on December 12, 2015, at UFC 194. Holloway won the fight via unanimous decision. Holloway faced Ricardo Lamas on June 4, 2016, at UFC 199. He won via unanimous decision.

==== Interim Featherweight Champion and unification ====
Holloway faced Anthony Pettis for the interim UFC Featherweight Championship on December 10, 2016, at UFC 206. At the weigh-ins, Pettis came in at 148 lbs., three pounds over the featherweight limit of 145 lbs for a championship fight. As a result, in case Pettis were to win the fight with Holloway, he would be ineligible for the UFC championship. Pettis was also fined 20% of his purse, which went to Holloway and the bout proceeded at a catchweight. Holloway won the fight via TKO in the third round and was awarded a Performance of the Night bonus.

Holloway faced the featherweight champion José Aldo in a title unification bout on June 3, 2017, at UFC 212. After facing some early adversity, Holloway defeated Aldo via TKO in the third round and earned his first Fight of the Night bonus award for the bout.

==== Featherweight Champion and pursuit of Lightweight gold ====
On October 4, 2017, Holloway revealed that he had signed a new multi-fight deal with UFC. Holloway was expected to face Frankie Edgar on December 2, 2017, at UFC 218; however, on November 8, 2017, Edgar withdrew from the card due to injury and was replaced by José Aldo. Holloway won the fight via TKO in the third round and defended the UFC Featherweight belt. The bout with Edgar was rescheduled and was expected to take place on March 3, 2018, at UFC 222. However, it was announced on February 3, 2018, that Holloway had been forced to pull out of the bout due to a leg injury.

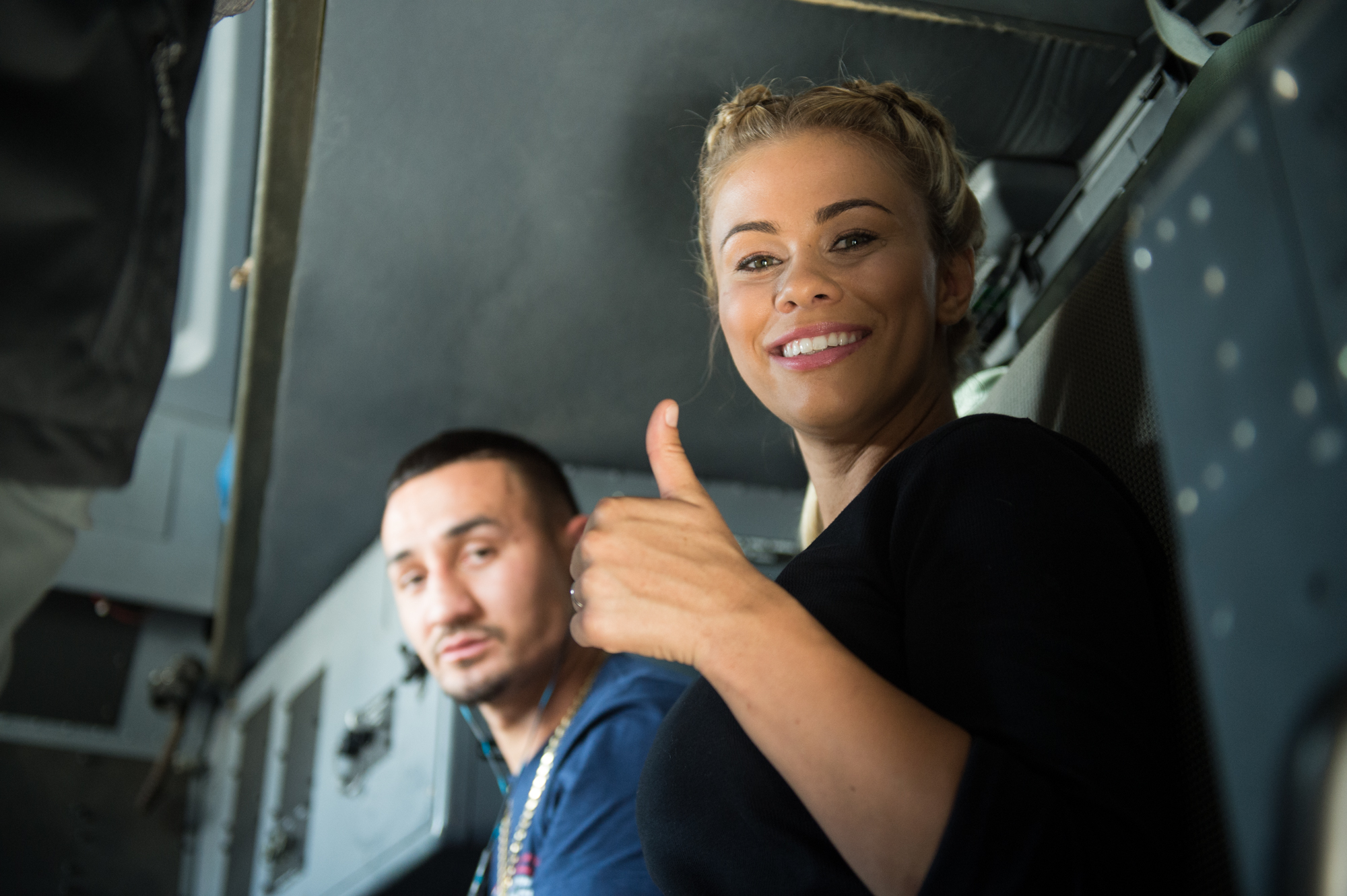
Holloway and Paige VanZant board a C-130 aircraft at Bagram Airfield inAfghanistan bound for Kandahar Airfield visiting U.S. servicemembers stationed in Afghanistan in 2018.

On April 1, 2018, Holloway was announced as a late replacement for the injured Tony Ferguson in a fight for the vacant undisputed UFC Lightweight Championship at UFC 223 against Khabib Nurmagomedov to be held on April 7, 2018. If victorious, Holloway would be only the second fighter (behind Conor McGregor) in UFC history to hold titles in two different divisions simultaneously. Holloway, who had no fight scheduled and was not in a training camp, accepted the fight with only six days to prepare. On April 6, as he was due to weigh in, Holloway was pulled from the card by New York State Athletic Commission doctors due to the severity of his short-notice weight cut. The bout continued with Al Iaquinta as a last minute replacement for Holloway.

Holloway was scheduled to defend his UFC Featherweight Championship title on July 7, 2018, at UFC 226 against Brian Ortega. However, on July 4, Holloway was pulled from the fight due to "concussion like symptoms". For his second title defense, Holloway faced Brian Ortega in the main event at UFC 231 in Toronto, Canada on December 8, 2018. Holloway won the fight via TKO at the end of fourth round by doctor stoppage. This win earned him the Fight of the Night and Performance of the Night awards. Holloway broke the record for most significant strikes in one fight with 290, broke the record for landing 134 of those significant strikes in a round, and set the record for most victories in UFC featherweight history with fifteen. Holloway later surpassed his own significant strike records against Calvin Kattar at UFC on ABC 1.

As a result of the Khabib Nurmagomedov incident at UFC 229, the then lightweight champion Nurmagomedov was unable to defend his undisputed title until late 2019 which led to an interim lightweight title fight. For the interim UFC Lightweight Championship, Holloway moved up a weight class to face Dustin Poirier in a rematch. He lost the back-and-forth fight by unanimous decision. This fight earned him the Fight of the Night award.

Holloway came back down to featherweight, and a bout against former UFC lightweight champion Frankie Edgar was scheduled a third time and eventually took place on July 27, 2019, in the main event of UFC 240. Holloway won the fight by unanimous decision, successfully defending his featherweight title for a third time. In a fourth title defense, Holloway faced Alexander Volkanovski on December 14, 2019, at UFC 245. He lost the fight via unanimous decision, ending his featherweight reign.

==== Post championship dominance and Volkanovski trilogy ====
Holloway faced Alexander Volkanovski in a rematch for the UFC Featherweight Championship on July 12 at UFC 251. He lost the fight via controversial split decision. Among media outlets, 18 out of 27 media scores gave it to Holloway. The decision was further criticized by UFC president Dana White, former referee and Unified Rules of Mixed Martial Arts co-creator John McCarthy, and multiple mixed martial artists.

Holloway faced Calvin Kattar on January 16, 2021, headlining UFC on ABC 1. Holloway dominated Kattar for all 5 rounds and won by unanimous decision, with two judges scoring the fight 50–43 and one judge scoring it 50–42 in his favor. As of February 2025, this is one of four bouts in UFC history to have a 50–42 scorecard. During the last two minutes of the fifth round, Holloway landed a two-punch combo and proceeded to stare at the commentary team sitting cage-side and talk to them, while effortlessly dodging Kattar's strikes and yelling "I'm the best boxer in the UFC!" to him, which generated talk about an homage to Muhammad Ali, known for his showboating. Holloway set the UFC single-fight records for total strikes landed and attempted, significant strikes landed and attempted, strike differential, distance strikes landed, significant head strikes landed and significant body strikes landed. His fourth round also set the record for strikes and significant strikes landed. Both fighters earned the Fight of the Night award.

Holloway was scheduled to face Yair Rodríguez on July 17, 2021, at UFC on ESPN 26. On June 17, 2021, reports stated that Holloway was forced to pull out of the fight with Rodríguez due to injury. The bout was rescheduled and Holloway faced Rodriguez on November 13, 2021, at UFC Fight Night 197. He won the fight via unanimous decision. Both fighters earned the Fight of the Night award.

Holloway was scheduled to face Alexander Volkanovski for the UFC Featherweight Championship on March 5, 2022, at UFC 272. However, a day after the fight announcement, Holloway was forced to pull from the event due to injury. The trilogy bout was rescheduled to occur at UFC 276 on July 2, 2022. Holloway lost the bout via unanimous decision.

Holloway faced Arnold Allen on April 15, 2023, at UFC on ESPN 44. He won the fight by unanimous decision. Holloway faced Jung Chan-sung on August 26, 2023, at UFC Fight Night 225. He won the bout via knockout at the beginning of the third round. This bout earned him a Fight of the Night award.

==== Return to Lightweight, BMF Champion, and Featherweight title fight ====
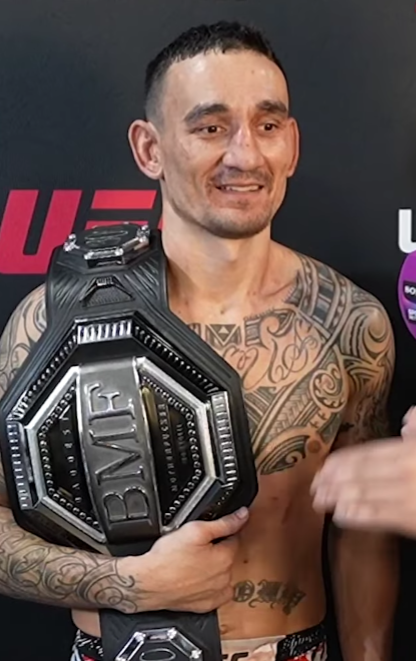
Holloway with the BMF belt

Holloway faced Justin Gaethje in a lightweight bout on April 13, 2024, at UFC 300 for the symbolic UFC 'BMF' ("baddest motherfucker") belt. Holloway won the BMF championship by knockout in the last second of round five, tying the record for the latest knockout win in UFC history. Due to the UFC increasing the payout of post fight bonuses from $50,000 to $300,000 for the event, the fight earned him a $300,000 Performance of the Night award and a $300,000 Fight of the Night award; overall he made $600,000. Holloway received universal acclaim for his performance against Gaethje, with his knockout being proclaimed as being among the greatest and most shocking in the sport's history.

Holloway faced champion Ilia Topuria for the UFC Featherweight Championship on October 26, 2024, at UFC 308. He lost the fight by knockout in the third round, leading to the first knockout loss of his career. In February 2025, Holloway confirmed via Twitter that he would stay at Lightweight permanently.

Holloway became the first person to defend the UFC 'BMF' belt against former interim UFC Lightweight Champion Dustin Poirier in a trilogy bout on July 19, 2025, at UFC 318, which was Poirier's retirement bout. Holloway won the fight by unanimous decision. In early August 2025, Holloway revealed he would not be able to compete later in the year due to a hand injury resulting from the most recent bout against Poirier.

During the UFC 2026 seasonal press conference it was announced that Holloway would be defending his symbolic UFC 'BMF' belt in a rematch against former UFC Lightweight Champion Charles Oliveira at UFC 326 on March 7, 2026. Holloway lost the title by unanimous decision.

Holloway had a rematch with Conor McGregor in a welterweight bout in the main event on July 11, 2026, at UFC 329. Holloway won the fight via technical knockout due to a knee injury suffered by McGregor early into the first round.

== Personal life ==
Holloway married his long-time girlfriend Kaimana Paʻaluhi in 2012; they have a son. The couple separated in 2014 and divorced in 2017. Holloway and Hawaiian pro surfer Alessa Quizon began dating in early 2020. They married on April 16, 2022.

== Championships and accomplishments ==
- Ultimate Fighting Championship
  - UFC Featherweight Championship (One time)
    - Three successful title defenses
    - Most finishes & most knockouts in UFC Featherweight title fights (4)
  - Interim UFC Featherweight Championship (One time)
    - Third most title fight wins in UFC Featherweight division history (5)
    - First American to win the UFC Featherweight Championship
  - UFC 'BMF' title (One time, former)
    - First fighter to win a UFC Interim, Undisputed and BMF title (later accomplished by Justin Gaethje)
    - One successful title defense
    - First fighter to defend the BMF title
  - Knockout of the Night (One time) vs. Will Chope
  - Fight of the Night (Seven times) vs. José Aldo, Brian Ortega, Dustin Poirier 2, Calvin Kattar, Yair Rodríguez, Jung Chan-sung and Justin Gaethje
    - Tied (Diego Sanchez, Joe Lauzon & Jim Miller) for the seventh most Fight of the Night bonuses in UFC history (7)
  - Performance of the Night (Five times) vs. Akira Corassani, Cub Swanson, Anthony Pettis, Brian Ortega and Justin Gaethje
    - Second most Post-Fight bonuses in UFC Featherweight division history (10) (behind Cub Swanson)
  - Tied (Jon Jones, Demetrious Johnson, Georges St-Pierre & Khabib Nurmagomedov) for fifth longest winning streak in UFC history (13)
  - Longest winning streak in UFC Featherweight division history (13)
  - Most wins in UFC Featherweight division history (20)
    - Fourth most wins in UFC history (24)
    - Second most wins in UFC/WEC Featherweight division history (20) (behind Cub Swanson)
  - Most knockouts in UFC Featherweight division history (9)
    - Tied (Vitor Belfort) for third most knockouts in UFC history (12)
    - One of five fighters (Jared Cannonier, Vitor Belfort, Conor McGregor & Robert Whittaker) to have knockout victories in three different weight classes
  - Most finishes in UFC Featherweight division history (11)
    - Tied (José Aldo) for most finishes in UFC/WEC Featherweight division history (11)
    - Tied (Matt Brown, Dustin Poirier & Vicente Luque) for fifth most finishes in UFC history (15)
  - Third most bouts in UFC Featherweight division history (27)
  - Most total fight time in UFC history (8:53:52)
    - Most total fight time in UFC Featherweight division history (6:58:57)
  - Tied (Andre Fili, Alexander Volkanovski & Movsar Evloev) for second most decision wins in UFC Featherweight division history (9) (behind Cub Swanson)
  - Fourth most knockdowns landed in UFC Featherweight division history (10)
  - Most consecutive bouts without being knocked down in UFC history (29) (ended vs. Ilia Topuria)
  - Tied (Demetrious Johnson & Yair Rodriguez) for the latest finish in UFC history (4:59 in R5 by KO vs. Justin Gaethje)
    - Latest finish in UFC Lightweight division history (4:59 in R5 vs. Justin Gaethje)
  - Tied (Yair Rodriguez) for the latest knockout in UFC history (4:59 in R5 vs. Justin Gaethje)
    - Latest knockout in UFC Lightweight division history (4:59 in R5 vs. Justin Gaethje)
  - Holds wins over eight former UFC champions (6 undisputed) — vs. Charles Oliveira 1, Anthony Pettis, José Aldo (twice), Frankie Edgar, Justin Gaethje, Conor McGregor 2, Yair Rodríguez (interim) & Dustin Poirier (interim)
  - 2022 UFC Forrest Griffin Community Award
  - UFC Honors Awards
    - 2019: President's Choice Fight of the Year Nominee vs. Dustin Poirier 2
    - 2021: President's Choice Fight of the Year Nominee vs. Yair Rodríguez
    - 2024: President's Choice Fight of the Year Winner vs. Justin Gaethje, President's Choice Performance of the Year Winner vs. Justin Gaethje & Fan's Choice Knockout of the Year Winner vs. Justin Gaethje
  - UFC.com Awards
    - 2012: Ranked #3 Newcomer of the Year
    - 2014: Ranked #9 Fighter of the Year
    - 2015: Ranked #8 Fighter of the Year
    - 2017: Fighter of the Year
    - 2018: Ranked #4 Fight of the Year vs. Brian Ortega
    - 2019: Ranked #4 Fight of the Year vs. Dustin Poirier 2
    - 2021: Ranked #6 Fighter of the Year & Ranked #3 Fight of the Year vs. Yair Rodríguez
    - 2024: Knockout of the Year & Ranked #3 Fight of the Year vs. Justin Gaethje
- X-1 World Events
  - X-1 Lightweight Championship (One time)
- 808 Battleground
  - 808 Battleground Amateur Featherweight Tournament Championship (One time)
- The Athletic
  - 2010s Men's Featherweight Fighter of the Decade
- Bloody Elbow
  - 2010s Featherweight Fighter of the Decade
- World MMA Awards
  - 2017 Charles 'Mask' Lewis Fighter of the Year
  - 2024 Fight of the Year vs. Justin Gaethje at UFC 300
  - 2024 Knockout of the Year vs. Justin Gaethje at UFC 300
- MMA Mania
  - 2017 Fighter of the Year
  - 2024 Knockout of the Year vs. Justin Gaethje at UFC 300
- Yahoo Sports
  - 2017 Male Fighter of the Year
  - 2024 Knockout of the Year vs. Justin Gaethje at UFC 300
- RealSport
  - 2017 Fighter of the Year
- Pundit Arena
  - 2017 Fighter of the Year
- MMA Fighting
  - 2017 Fighter of the Year
  - 2024 Fight of the Year vs. Justin Gaethje at UFC 300
  - 2024 Knockout of the Year vs. Justin Gaethje at UFC 300
  - 2024 First Team MMA All-Star
  - 2025 #3 Ranked Fight of the Year vs. Dustin Poirier at UFC 318
- BishopSportsNetwork.com
  - 2017 Fighter of the Year
- MMADNA.nl
  - 2018 Performance of the Year vs. Brian Ortega
- Sherdog
  - 2021 Beatdown of the Year vs. Calvin Kattar
- MMA Junkie
  - 2016 #7 Ranked Fighter of the Year
  - 2017 Male Fighter of the Year
  - 2023 April Fight of the Month vs. Arnold Allen
  - 2024 Knockout of the Year vs. Justin Gaethje at UFC 300
  - 2024 April Fight of the Month vs. Justin Gaethje
  - 2010s #10 Ranked Fighter of the Decade
- Combat Press
  - 2017 Male Fighter of the Year
  - 2024 Knockout of the Year vs. Justin Gaethje at UFC 300
- LowKick MMA
  - 2024 Knockout of the Year vs. Justin Gaethje at UFC 300
- Cageside Press
  - 2017 Male Fighter of the Year
  - 2024 Knockout of the Year vs. Justin Gaethje
- Wrestling Observer Newsletter
  - 2024 MMA Match of the Year vs. Justin Gaethje at UFC 300
- BodySlam.net
  - 2024 Knockout of the Year vs. Justin Gaethje
- ESPN
  - 2017 Fighter of the Year Honorable Mention
  - 2024 Fight of the Year vs. Justin Gaethje
  - 2024 Knockout of the Year vs. Justin Gaethje
- Bleacher Report
  - 2014 #10 Ranked Fighter of the Year
  - 2024 Knockout of the Year vs. Justin Gaethje
- Rolling Stone
  - 2017 Fighter of the Year
- Fight Matrix
  - 2017 Male Fighter of the Year tied with Demetrious Johnson
  - 2017 Most Noteworthy Match of the Year vs. José Aldo II at UFC 218
  - 2020 Most Noteworthy Match of the Year vs. Alexander Volkanovski II at UFC 251
- CBS Sports
  - 2016 #6 Ranked UFC Fighter of the Year
  - 2016 #10 Ranked UFC Fight of the Year vs. Ricardo Lamas
  - 2017 UFC Fighter of the Year
  - 2018 #5 Ranked UFC Fighter of the Year
  - 2018 #4 Ranked UFC Fight of the Year vs. Brian Ortega
  - 2019 #2 Ranked UFC Fight of the Year vs. Dustin Poirier
  - 2024 UFC Knockout of the Year vs. Justin Gaethje
- Slacky Awards
  - 2016 Technical Turn-Around of the Year
  - 2020 Gameplan of the Year vs. Alexander Volkanovski 2 at UFC 251
- UFC History Striking Records
  - Most significant strikes landed (3693)
    - Most landed in title fights (1414)
  - Most total strikes landed (3994)
  - Most significant strikes absorbed (2457)
  - Most bouts with 100 or more significant strikes (17)
  - Most bouts with 200 or more significant strikes (3)
  - Most significant strikes landed in a fight (445 vs. Calvin Kattar)
    - Second most landed in a fight (290 (Note: Most in a UFC title fight.) vs. Brian Ortega)
  - Most significant strikes attempted in a fight (744 vs. Calvin Kattar)
  - Highest striking differential in a fight (+312 vs. Calvin Kattar)
    - Third highest in a fight (+180 vs. Brian Ortega)
  - Second most total strikes landed in a fight (447 vs Calvin Kattar)
  - Most distance strikes landed in a fight (439 vs. Calvin Kattar)
    - Second most landed in a fight (281 vs. Brian Ortega)
  - Most significant head strikes landed in a fight (274 vs. Calvin Kattar)
    - Second most landed in a fight (244 vs. Brian Ortega)
  - Most significant body strikes landed in a fight (117 vs. Calvin Kattar)
  - Most total strikes attempted in a fight (746 vs. Calvin Kattar)
  - Fourth most total head strikes landed in a fight (274 vs. Calvin Kattar)
    - Fourth most landed in a fight (254 vs. Brian Ortega)
  - Most significant strikes landed in a round (141 in R4 vs. Calvin Kattar)
    - Second most landed in a round (134 in R4 vs. Brian Ortega)
  - Second most significant strikes attempted in a round (204 in R3 vs. Jose Aldo 2)
    - Fourth most attempted in a round (196 in R4 vs. Brian Ortega)
    - Fifth most attempted in a round (191 in R4 vs. Calvin Kattar)
  - Second most total strikes attempted in a round (212 in R3 vs. Jose Aldo 2)
    - Third most attempted in a round (203 in R4 vs. Brian Ortega)
    - Fourth most attempted in a round (191 in R4 vs. Calvin Kattar)
- UFC Featherweight Division Striking records
  - Most significant strikes landed (2971)
  - Most total strikes landed (3180)
  - Fourth most significant strikes landed-per-minute (7.09)
  - Fifth highest striking differential (2.44)
  - Most significant strikes landed in a fight (445 vs. Calvin Kattar)
    - Second most landed in a fight (290 (Note: Most in a UFC Featherweight title fight.) vs. Brian Ortega)
    - Fourth most landed in a fight (230 vs. Yair Rodriguez)
  - Most significant strikes attempted in a fight (744 vs. Calvin Kattar)
    - Third most attempted in a fight (490 vs. Brian Ortega)
    - Fifth most attempted in a fight (404 vs. Yair Rodriguez)
  - Most significant head strikes landed in a fight (274 vs. Calvin Kattar)
    - Second most landed in a fight (244 vs. Brian Ortega)
  - Most significant body strikes landed in a fight (117 vs. Calvin Kattar)
    - Third most landed in a fight (66 vs. Yair Rodriguez)
  - Highest striking differential in a fight (+312 vs. Calvin Kattar)
  - Third highest in a fight (+180 vs. Brian Ortega)
  - Most distance strikes landed in a fight (439 vs. Calvin Kattar)
    - Second most landed in a fight (281 vs. Brian Ortega)
    - Fifth most landed in a fight (187 vs. Yair Rodriguez)
  - Most total strikes landed in a fight (447 vs Calvin Kattar)
    - Second most landed in a fight (307 vs Brian Ortega)
  - Most total strikes attempted in a fight (746 vs. Calvin Kattar)
    - Third most attempted in a fight (507 vs. Brian Ortega)
    - Fourth most attempted in a fight (434 vs. Yair Rodriguez)
  - Most total head strikes landed in a fight (274 vs. Calvin Kattar)
    - Second most landed in a fight (254 vs. Brian Ortega)
  - Most total body strikes landed in a fight (119 vs. Calvin Kattar)
  - Fourth most leg kicks landed in a fight (54 vs. Calvin Kattar)
  - Most significant strikes landed in a round (141 in R4 vs. Calvin Kattar)
    - Second most landed in a round (134 in R4 vs. Brian Ortega)
    - Third most landed in a round (108 in R3 vs. Jose Aldo 2)
    - Fifth most landed in a round (89 in R2 vs. Calvin Kattar)
  - Most significant strikes attempted in a round (204 in R3 vs. Jose Aldo 2)
    - Third most attempted in a round (196 in R4 vs. Brian Ortega)
    - Fourth most attempted in a round (191 in R4 vs. Calvin Kattar)
  - Most total strikes landed in a round (141 in R4 vs. Brian Ortega & in R4 vs. Calvin Kattar)
  - Most total strikes attempted in a round (212 in R3 vs. Jose Aldo 2)
    - Second most attempted in a round (203 in R4 vs. Brian Ortega)
    - Fourth most attempted in a round (191 in R4 vs. Calvin Kattar)
- UFC Lightweight Division Striking Records
  - Most significant strikes attempted in a fight (446 (Note: Most in a UFC Lightweight title fight.) vs. Dustin Poirier 2)
  - Most significant body strikes landed in a fight (64 vs. Dustin Poirier 3)
    - Second most landed in a fight (62 vs. Justin Gaethje)
  - Most total strikes attempted in a fight (473 vs. Dustin Poirier 2)
  - Most leg kicks landed in a fight (57 vs. Justin Gaethje)
  - Third most significant strikes landed in a fight (198 vs. Dustin Poirier 3)
  - Fourth most distant strikes landed in a fight (182 vs. Dustin Poirier 3)
  - Fourth most total leg strikes landed in a fight (57 vs. Justin Gaethje)

== Mixed martial arts record ==
Professional record breakdown
37 matches	28 wins	9 losses
By knockout	13	1
By submission	2	1
By decision	13	7

Res.	Record	Opponent	Method	Event	Date	Round	Time	Location	Notes
Win	28–9	Conor McGregor	TKO (knee injury)	UFC 329	July 11, 2026	1	1:09	Las Vegas, Nevada, United States	Welterweight debut.
Loss	27–9	Charles Oliveira	Decision (unanimous)	UFC 326	March 7, 2026	5	5:00	Las Vegas, Nevada, United States	Lost the symbolic UFC "BMF" title.
Win	27–8	Dustin Poirier	Decision (unanimous)	UFC 318	July 19, 2025	5	5:00	New Orleans, Louisiana, United States	Return to Lightweight. Defended the symbolic UFC "BMF" title.
Loss	26–8	Ilia Topuria	KO (punches)	UFC 308	October 26, 2024	3	1:34	Abu Dhabi, United Arab Emirates	For the UFC Featherweight Championship.
Win	26–7	Justin Gaethje	KO (punch)	UFC 300	April 13, 2024	5	4:59	Las Vegas, Nevada, United States	Lightweight bout. Won the symbolic UFC "BMF" title. Performance of the Night. Fight of the Night.
Win	25–7	Jung Chan-sung	KO (punch)	UFC Fight Night: Holloway vs. The Korean Zombie	August 26, 2023	3	0:23	Kallang, Singapore	Fight of the Night.
Win	24–7	Arnold Allen	Decision (unanimous)	UFC on ESPN: Holloway vs. Allen	April 15, 2023	5	5:00	Kansas City, Missouri, United States	
Loss	23–7	Alexander Volkanovski	Decision (unanimous)	UFC 276	July 2, 2022	5	5:00	Las Vegas, Nevada, United States	For the UFC Featherweight Championship.
Win	23–6	Yair Rodríguez	Decision (unanimous)	UFC Fight Night: Holloway vs. Rodríguez	November 13, 2021	5	5:00	Las Vegas, Nevada, United States	Fight of the Night.
Win	22–6	Calvin Kattar	Decision (unanimous)	UFC on ABC: Holloway vs. Kattar	January 16, 2021	5	5:00	Abu Dhabi, United Arab Emirates	Fight of the Night.
Loss	21–6	Alexander Volkanovski	Decision (split)	UFC 251	July 12, 2020	5	5:00	Abu Dhabi, United Arab Emirates	For the UFC Featherweight Championship.
Loss	21–5	Alexander Volkanovski	Decision (unanimous)	UFC 245	December 14, 2019	5	5:00	Las Vegas, Nevada, United States	Lost the UFC Featherweight Championship.
Win	21–4	Frankie Edgar	Decision (unanimous)	UFC 240	July 27, 2019	5	5:00	Edmonton, Alberta, Canada	Defended the UFC Featherweight Championship.
Loss	20–4	Dustin Poirier	Decision (unanimous)	UFC 236	April 13, 2019	5	5:00	Atlanta, Georgia, United States	For the interim UFC Lightweight Championship. Fight of the Night.
Win	20–3	Brian Ortega	TKO (doctor stoppage)	UFC 231	December 8, 2018	4	5:00	Toronto, Ontario, Canada	Defended the UFC Featherweight Championship. Performance of the Night. Fight of the Night.
Win	19–3	José Aldo	TKO (punches)	UFC 218	December 2, 2017	3	4:51	Detroit, Michigan, United States	Defended the UFC Featherweight Championship.
Win	18–3	José Aldo	TKO (punches)	UFC 212	June 3, 2017	3	4:13	Rio de Janeiro, Brazil	Won and unified the UFC Featherweight Championship. Fight of the Night.
Win	17–3	Anthony Pettis	TKO (body kick and punches)	UFC 206	December 10, 2016	3	4:50	Toronto, Ontario, Canada	Won the interim UFC Featherweight Championship; Pettis missed weight (148 lb) and was ineligible to win the title. Performance of the Night.
Win	16–3	Ricardo Lamas	Decision (unanimous)	UFC 199	June 4, 2016	3	5:00	Inglewood, California, United States	
Win	15–3	Jeremy Stephens	Decision (unanimous)	UFC 194	December 12, 2015	3	5:00	Las Vegas, Nevada, United States	
Win	14–3	Charles Oliveira	TKO (neck injury)	UFC Fight Night: Holloway vs. Oliveira	August 23, 2015	1	1:39	Saskatoon, Saskatchewan, Canada	
Win	13–3	Cub Swanson	Submission (guillotine choke)	UFC on Fox: Machida vs. Rockhold	April 18, 2015	3	3:58	Newark, New Jersey, United States	Performance of the Night.
Win	12–3	Cole Miller	Decision (unanimous)	UFC Fight Night: Henderson vs. Thatch	February 14, 2015	3	5:00	Broomfield, Colorado, United States	
Win	11–3	Akira Corassani	KO (punches)	UFC Fight Night: Nelson vs. Story	October 4, 2014	1	3:11	Stockholm, Sweden	Performance of the Night.
Win	10–3	Clay Collard	TKO (punches)	UFC Fight Night: Henderson vs. dos Anjos	August 23, 2014	3	3:47	Tulsa, Oklahoma, United States	Catchweight (149 lb) bout.
Win	9–3	Andre Fili	Submission (guillotine choke)	UFC 172	April 26, 2014	3	3:39	Baltimore, Maryland, United States	
Win	8–3	Will Chope	TKO (punches)	UFC Fight Night: Saffiedine vs. Lim	January 4, 2014	2	2:27	Marina Bay, Singapore	Knockout of the Night.
Loss	7–3	Conor McGregor	Decision (unanimous)	UFC Fight Night: Shogun vs. Sonnen	August 17, 2013	3	5:00	Boston, Massachusetts, United States	
Loss	7–2	Dennis Bermudez	Decision (split)	UFC 160	May 25, 2013	3	5:00	Las Vegas, Nevada, United States	
Win	7–1	Leonard Garcia	Decision (split)	UFC 155	December 29, 2012	3	5:00	Las Vegas, Nevada, United States	
Win	6–1	Justin Lawrence	TKO (punches)	UFC 150	August 11, 2012	2	4:49	Denver, Colorado, United States	
Win	5–1	Pat Schilling	Decision (unanimous)	The Ultimate Fighter: Live Finale	June 1, 2012	3	5:00	Las Vegas, Nevada, United States	
Loss	4–1	Dustin Poirier	Submission (triangle armbar)	UFC 143	February 4, 2012	1	3:23	Las Vegas, Nevada, United States	Featherweight debut.
Win	4–0	Eddie Rincon	Decision (unanimous)	UIC 4: War on the Valley Isle	July 1, 2011	3	5:00	Honolulu, Hawaii, United States	
Win	3–0	Harris Sarmiento	Decision (split)	X-1 World Events 40	March 12, 2011	5	5:00	Honolulu, Hawaii, United States	Won the X-1 Lightweight Championship.
Win	2–0	Bryson Kamaka	KO (punches)	X-1 World Events 37	November 6, 2010	1	3:09	Honolulu, Hawaii, United States	
Win	1–0	Duke Saragosa	Decision (unanimous)	X-1 World Events 36	September 11, 2010	3	5:00	Honolulu, Hawaii, United States	Lightweight debut.

== Pay-per-view bouts ==
No	Event	Fight	Date	Venue	City	PPV buys
1	UFC 206	Holloway vs. Pettis	December 10, 2016	Scotiabank Arena	Toronto, Ontario, Canada	150,000
2.	UFC 212	Aldo vs. Holloway	June 3, 2017	Jeunesse Arena	Rio de Janeiro, Brazil	200,000
3.	UFC 218	Holloway vs. Aldo 2	December 2, 2017	Little Caesars Arena	Detroit, Michigan, United States	230,000
4.	UFC 231	Holloway vs. Ortega	December 8, 2018	Scotiabank Arena	Toronto, Ontario, Canada	300,000
5.	UFC 236	Holloway vs. Poirier 2	April 13, 2019	State Farm Arena	Atlanta, Georgia, United States	100,000
6.	UFC 240	Holloway vs. Edgar	July 27, 2019	Rogers Place	Edmonton, Alberta, Canada	Not Disclosed
7.	UFC 308	Topuria vs. Holloway	October 26, 2024	Etihad Arena	Abu Dhabi, United Arab Emirates	Not Disclosed
8.	UFC 318	Holloway vs. Poirier 3	July 19, 2025	Smoothie King Center	New Orleans, Louisiana, United States	Not Disclosed

== See also ==
- List of current UFC fighters
- List of male mixed martial artists

Achievements
Vacant Title last held by José Aldo	3rd UFC Interim Featherweight Champion; December 10, 2016 – June 3, 2017	Vacant Title next held by Yair Rodríguez
Preceded by José Aldo	4th UFC Featherweight Champion; June 3, 2017 – December 14, 2019	Succeeded by Alexander Volkanovski
Preceded by Justin Gaethje	3rd UFC BMF Champion; April 13, 2024 – March 7, 2026	Succeeded by Charles Oliveira
Awards
Preceded by Conor McGregor	World MMA Fighter of the Year; 2017	Succeeded by Daniel Cormier
Preceded by Islam Makhachev vs. Alexander Volkanovski	World MMA Fight of the Year; 2023–24 vs. Justin Gaethje at UFC 300	Incumbent
Preceded by Leon Edwards	World MMA Knockout of the Year; 2023–24 vs. Justin Gaethje at UFC 300	Incumbent
UFC records
Preceded by Michael Bisping	Most significant strikes landed December 8, 2018 – present 3,655	Incumbent
Preceded by Georges St-Pierre	Most total strikes landed January 16, 2021 – present 3,907	Incumbent
