= UFC on Fox: Gustafsson vs. Johnson =

UFC mixed martial arts event in 2015

- The poster for UFC on Fox: Gustafsson vs. Johnson
- Promotion: Ultimate Fighting Championship
- Date: January 24, 2015
- Venue: Tele2 Arena
- City: Stockholm, Sweden
- Attendance: 30,000
- Total gate: $3.1 million

Event chronology
UFC Fight Night: McGregor vs. Siver	UFC on Fox: Gustafsson vs. Johnson	UFC 183: Silva vs. Diaz

UFC on Fox: Gustafsson vs. Johnson (also known as UFC on Fox 14) was a mixed martial arts event held on January 24, 2015, at the Tele2 Arena in Stockholm, Sweden.

== Background ==
This was the fourth event that the UFC has held in Sweden and the first to take place in a different arena as the previous events were held at Ericsson Globe Arena. It was also the second stadium venue to host a UFC event after UFC 129, which took place at the Rogers Centre in Canada.

The event was headlined by a light heavyweight bout between Alexander Gustafsson and Anthony Johnson. The UFC subsequently announced that the winner of the main event will receive a title shot against UFC Light Heavyweight champion Jon Jones. Initially, the UFC was preparing a main event between Gustafsson and Rashad Evans. On November 5, Evans announced he would not be ready during that time frame as he was still rehabilitating from a lingering knee injury.

For the event to be broadcast live during Prime time hours on the east coast of North America, the main card began at 2:00 am (January 25) local time in Stockholm (CET), with a full preliminary card beginning at approximately 11:00 pm (January 24) local time.

Yan Cabral was expected to face Mairbek Taisumov at the event. On December 30, Cabral was pulled from the fight for undisclosed reasons and was replaced by promotional newcomer Anthony Christodoulou.

Alan Omer was expected to face Mirsad Bektić at the event. On January 12, Omer pulled out of the fight with an undisclosed injury and was replaced by promotional newcomer Paul Redmond.

Paul Redmond missed weight on his first attempt at the weigh ins, coming in at 149 pounds. He was given additional time to make the featherweight limit, but made no attempt to cut further. Instead, he was fined 20 percent of his purse, which went to Mirsad Bektić.

The event had the richest live gate in the company's history on the continent at $3.1 million. It also registered the UFC's second biggest attendance in history as 30,000 fans witnessed UFC's first visit to a European stadium.

== Results ==
Main Card (Fox)
Weight class				Method	Round	Time	Notes
Light Heavyweight	Anthony Johnson	def.	Alexander Gustafsson	TKO (punches)	1	2:15	(Note: UFC Light Heavyweight Championship title eliminator.)
Middleweight	Gegard Mousasi	def.	Dan Henderson	TKO (punches)	1	1:10
Light Heavyweight	Ryan Bader	def.	Phil Davis	Decision (split) (29–28, 28–29, 29–28)	3	5:00
Featherweight	Sam Sicilia	def.	Akira Corassani	KO (punch)	1	3:26
Preliminary Card (Fox Sports 1)
Welterweight	Albert Tumenov	def.	Nico Musoke	Decision (unanimous) (29–28, 29–28, 29–28)	3	5:00
Welterweight	Kenny Robertson	def.	Sultan Aliev	TKO (punches)	1	2:42
Featherweight	Makwan Amirkhani	def.	Andy Ogle	TKO (flying knee and punches)	1	0:08
Light Heavyweight	Nikita Krylov	def.	Stanislav Nedkov	Submission (standing guillotine choke)	1	1:24
Lightweight	Mairbek Taisumov	def.	Anthony Christodoulou	KO (punches)	2	0:38
Catchweight (149 lb)	Mirsad Bektić	def.	Paul Redmond	Decision (unanimous) (30–27, 30–27, 30–25)	3	5:00
Preliminary Card (UFC Fight Pass)
Heavyweight	Viktor Pešta	def.	Konstantin Erokhin	Decision (unanimous) (29–28, 30–27, 30–27)	3	5:00
Flyweight	Neil Seery	def.	Chris Beal	Decision (unanimous) (29–28, 30–27, 29–28)	3	5:00

== Bonus awards ==
The following fighters were awarded $50,000 bonuses:

- Fight of the Night: None awarded
- Performance of the Night: Anthony Johnson, Gegard Mousasi, Kenny Robertson and Makwan Amirkhani

== See also ==
- List of UFC events
- 2015 in UFC
