= Fightland =

Martial arts website

fightland.vice.com
- Available in: English, Spanish
- Owner: Vice Media
- Website: fightland.vice.com
- Commercial: Yes
- Registration: Yes
- Launched: 2012
- Current status: Defunct

Fightland is a website covering mixed martial arts (MMA). Launched in September 2012, it is part of Vice Media, Inc. network channels. Vice Media states that Fightland is a joint venture with the Ultimate Fighting Championship (UFC). The New Yorker describes it as a vertical in which the UFC is sponsoring the whole website, and in general, concludes that "Vice's sponsored material can feel like a strange beast, neither advertising nor regular content but something in between."

Fightland has been criticized by Cagepotato and Deadspin for not being transparent to their readers that it is funded by the UFC, and that it is operating as a marketing arm or acting as a shill. The UFC, Vice Media and Fightland refused to comment on the subject when asked. At UFC 164 weigh-ins, UFC president Dana White wore an official Fightland T-shirt.

Fightland editor-in-chief is Michael Hresko. A notable writer for the website is MMA analyst Jack Slack. Other notable writers include Peter Carroll and Tom Taylor.

Fightland was a 2014 World MMA Awards nominee for the "MMA media source of the year" award.

On May 15, 2023, Vice Media formally filed for Chapter 11 bankruptcy, as part of a possible sale to a consortium of lenders including Fortress Investment Group, which will, alongside Soros Fund Management and Monroe Capital, invest $225 million as a credit bid for nearly all of its assets.
