= UFC on Fox: Dillashaw vs. Barão 2 =

UFC mixed martial arts event in 2015

- The poster for UFC on Fox: Dillashaw vs. Barão 2
- Promotion: Ultimate Fighting Championship
- Date: July 25, 2015
- Venue: United Center
- City: Chicago, Illinois
- Attendance: 11,663
- Total gate: $1,200,000

Event chronology
UFC Fight Night: Bisping vs. Leites	UFC on Fox: Dillashaw vs. Barão 2	UFC 190: Rousey vs. Correia

UFC on Fox: Dillashaw vs. Barão 2 (also known as UFC on Fox 16) was a mixed martial arts event held on July 25, 2015, at the United Center in Chicago, Illinois.

== Background ==
The event was headlined by a UFC Bantamweight Championship rematch between current champion T.J. Dillashaw and former champion Renan Barão. Their first fight took place at UFC 173 which ended in a fifth round technical knockout victory for Dillashaw that won him the title. Prior to this event, the rematch had been rescheduled for two other events. The first of which was UFC 177, where Barão withdrew from the bout on the day of weigh-ins, as he had to be admitted to a hospital as a result of his attempts to cut weight. The second was UFC 186, where Dillashaw withdrew from the bout due to a broken rib.

Former UFC Lightweight champion Anthony Pettis was expected to face Myles Jury at the event. However, Pettis pulled out of the bout on May 7 due to an elbow injury and was replaced by Edson Barboza. In turn, Jury pulled out the bout on June 9 due to an injury and was replaced by Paul Felder.

A lightweight bout between Danny Castillo and Rustam Khabilov that was previously scheduled for UFC 182 was expected to take place at this event. However, once again, Khabilov was pulled from the bout due to complications with his visa. Castillo remained on the card against Jim Miller.

Erik Koch was expected to face Ramsey Nijem at the event. However, Koch pulled out of the bout in late June due to an injury and was replaced by promotional newcomer Andrew Holbrook.

Antônio Braga Neto was expected to face Zak Cummings at this event. However, Neto pulled out of the bout in early July due to an injury and was replaced by promotional newcomer Dominique Steele.

== Results ==
Main Card (Fox)
Weight class				Method	Round	Time	Notes
Bantamweight	T.J. Dillashaw (c)	def.	Renan Barão	TKO (punches)	4	0:35	(Note: For the UFC Bantamweight Championship.)
Women's Bantamweight	Miesha Tate	def.	Jessica Eye	Decision (unanimous) (30–27, 30–27, 30–27)	3	5:00
Lightweight	Edson Barboza	def.	Paul Felder	Decision (unanimous) (29–28, 29–28, 29–28)	3	5:00
Lightweight	Joe Lauzon	def.	Takanori Gomi	TKO (punches)	1	2:37
Preliminary Card (Fox)
Light Heavyweight	Tom Lawlor	def.	Gian Villante	KO (punch)	2	0:27
Lightweight	Jim Miller	def.	Danny Castillo	Decision (split) (28–29, 29–28, 30–27)	3	5:00
Welterweight	Ben Saunders	def.	Kenny Robertson	Decision (split) (29–28, 28–29, 29–28)	3	5:00
Bantamweight	Bryan Caraway	def.	Eddie Wineland	Decision (unanimous) (29–28, 29–28, 30–27)	3	5:00
Preliminary Card (UFC Fight Pass)
Lightweight	James Krause	def.	Daron Cruickshank	Submission (rear-naked choke)	1	1:27
Lightweight	Andrew Holbrook	def.	Ramsey Nijem	Decision (split) (29–28, 28–29, 29–28)	3	5:00
Women's Bantamweight	Elizabeth Phillips	def.	Jessamyn Duke	Decision (unanimous) (29–28, 29–28, 29–28)	3	5:00
Welterweight	Zak Cummings	def.	Dominique Steele	TKO (punches)	1	0:43

== Bonus awards ==
The following fighters were awarded $50,000 bonuses:

- Fight of the Night: Edson Barboza vs. Paul Felder
- Performance of the Night: T.J. Dillashaw and Tom Lawlor

== See also ==
- List of UFC events
- 2015 in UFC
