= UFC 229 =

UFC mixed martial arts event in 2018

UFC 229: Khabib vs. McGregor
- The poster for UFC 229: Khabib vs. McGregor
- Promotion: Ultimate Fighting Championship
- Date: October 6, 2018
- Venue: T-Mobile Arena
- City: Paradise, Nevada, United States
- Attendance: 20,034
- Total gate: $17,188,894.67
- Buyrate: 2,400,000

Event chronology
UFC Fight Night: Santos vs. Anders	UFC 229: Khabib vs. McGregor	UFC Fight Night: Volkan vs. Smith

UFC 229: Khabib vs. McGregor was a mixed martial arts event produced by the Ultimate Fighting Championship (UFC) that was held on October 6, 2018. The fight took place between Khabib Nurmagomedov and Conor McGregor at the T-Mobile Arena in Paradise, Nevada, part of the Las Vegas Metropolitan Area, United States.

This event was one of the most anticipated MMA events of all time, and is the most-bought UFC (and MMA) pay-per-view of all time with a buyrate of 2.4 million.

== Background ==
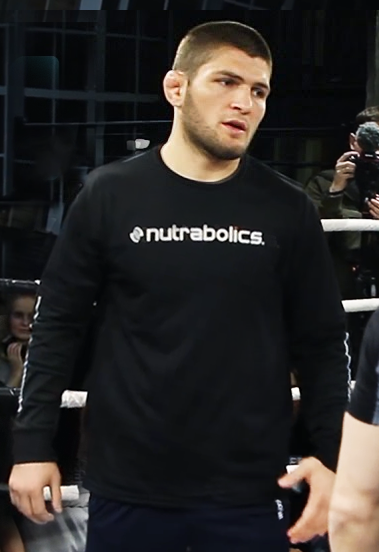
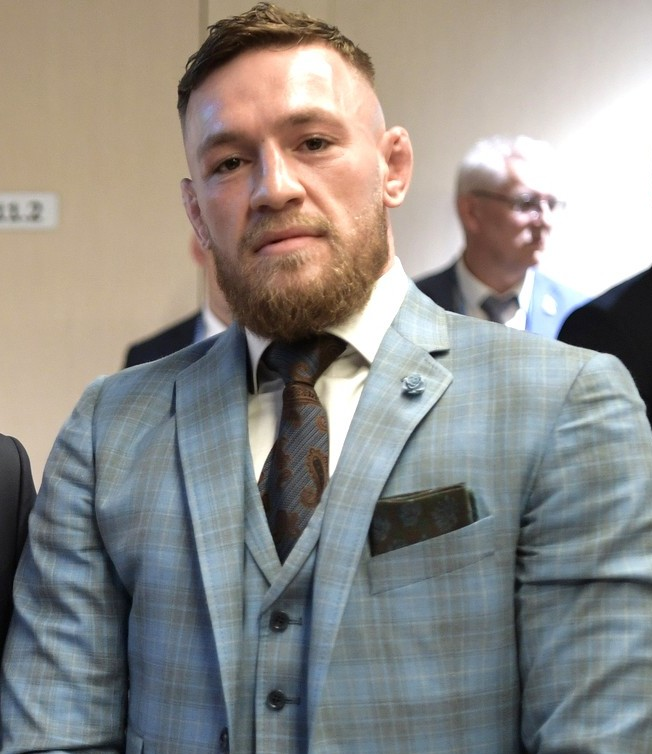
Going into the fight Nurmagomedov (left) had an undefeated record of 26–0, while McGregor (right) was the first fighter to hold titles in two divisions simultaneously. The fight was dubbed "the biggest in UFC history" by organization president Dana White.

The event was headlined by a UFC Lightweight Championship bout between the undefeated current UFC Lightweight champion Khabib Nurmagomedov and former featherweight and lightweight champion Conor McGregor. McGregor captured the lightweight title at UFC 205, when he was the reigning featherweight champion. McGregor never defended the title, he took some time off in 2017 due to the birth of his firstborn and later venturing himself in a boxing match against Floyd Mayweather Jr. The UFC originally planned an interim title bout between Nurmagomedov and The Ultimate Fighter: Team Lesnar vs. Team dos Santos welterweight winner Tony Ferguson at UFC 209, but it was canceled due to Khabib having medical issues related to his weight cut on weigh-in day. Ferguson eventually won the interim title at UFC 216 against Kevin Lee. Ferguson was then expected to meet Nurmagomedov at UFC 223, with the winner being crowned the undisputed champion (as McGregor would be stripped of the title as soon as the bout took place). In turn, it was scrapped once again (fourth time) as Ferguson got injured, and after several possibilities for an opponent, Nurmagomedov eventually won the vacant title against Al Iaquinta. The event was preceded by a widely publicized incident in which McGregor threw a dolly at a bus carrying Nurmagomedov and other fighters, injuring two. He was arrested and charged, but the UFC did not formally discipline him. Footage of the incident was later used in official promotion, sparking controversy, though UFC President Dana White defended its inclusion.

Jussier Formiga was previously scheduled to face Sergio Pettis in January 2017 at UFC Fight Night: Rodríguez vs. Penn. However, Formiga pulled out of the fight for undisclosed reasons. The pairing was rescheduled for this event.

On October 1, Sean O'Malley announced that he was pulled from a bout against José Alberto Quiñónez after failing a US Anti-Doping Agency (USADA) drug test. In turn, promotion officials elected to remove Quiñónez from the card and reschedule him for a future event.

== Results ==
Main Card
Weight class				Method	Round	Time	Notes
Lightweight	Khabib Nurmagomedov (c)	def.	Conor McGregor	Submission (neck crank)	4	3:03	(Note: For the UFC Lightweight Championship.)
Lightweight	Tony Ferguson	def.	Anthony Pettis	TKO (corner stoppage)	2	5:00
Light Heavyweight	Dominick Reyes	def.	Ovince Saint Preux	Decision (unanimous) (30–27, 30–27, 30–27)	3	5:00
Heavyweight	Derrick Lewis	def.	Alexander Volkov	KO (punches)	3	4:49	(Note: UFC heavyweight title eliminator)
Women's Strawweight	Michelle Waterson	def.	Felice Herrig	Decision (unanimous) (30–26, 29–28, 30–27)	3	5:00
Preliminary Card (Fox Sports 1)
Flyweight	Jussier Formiga	def.	Sergio Pettis	Decision (unanimous) (30–26, 29–28, 29–28)	3	5:00
Welterweight	Vicente Luque	def.	Jalin Turner	KO (punches)	1	3:52
Women's Bantamweight	Aspen Ladd	def.	Tonya Evinger	TKO (punches)	1	3:26
Lightweight	Scott Holtzman	def.	Alan Patrick	KO (elbows)	3	3:42
Preliminary Card (UFC Fight Pass)
Women's Bantamweight	Yana Kunitskaya	def.	Lina Länsberg	Decision (unanimous) (30–27, 30–27, 30–27)	3	5:00
Lightweight	Nik Lentz	def.	Gray Maynard	TKO (head kick and punches)	2	1:19
Welterweight	Anthony Rocco Martin	def.	Ryan LaFlare	TKO (head kick and punches)	3	1:00

== Bonus awards ==
The following fighters received $50,000 bonuses:

- Fight of the Night: Tony Ferguson vs. Anthony Pettis
- Performance of the Night: Derrick Lewis and Aspen Ladd

== Reported payout ==
The following is the reported payout to the fighters as reported to the Nevada State Athletic Commission. It does not include sponsor money and also does not include the UFC's traditional "fight night" bonuses. The total disclosed payout for the event was $6,636,000.

- Khabib Nurmagomedov: $2,000,000 (no win bonus) def. Conor McGregor: $3,000,000
- Tony Ferguson: $250,000 (includes $50,000 win bonus) def. Anthony Pettis: $100,000
- Dominick Reyes: $100,000(includes $45,000 win bonus) def. Ovince Saint Preux: $86,000
- Derrick Lewis: $270,000 (includes $135,000 win bonus) def. Alexander Volkov: $75,000
- Michelle Waterson: $100,000 (includes $50,000 win bonus) def. Felice Herrig: $40,000
- Jussier Formiga: $86,000 (includes $43,000 win bonus) def. Sergio Pettis: $46,000
- Vicente Luque: $76,000 (includes $38,000 win bonus) def. Jalin Turner: $10,000
- Aspen Ladd: $24,000 (includes $12,000 win bonus) def. Tonya Evinger: $30,000
- Scott Holtzman: $60,000 (includes $30,000 win bonus) def. Alan Patrick: $30,000
- Yana Kunitskaya: $50,000 (includes $25,000 win bonus) def. Lina Länsberg: $20,000
- Nik Lentz: $100,000 (includes $50,000 win bonus) def. Grey Maynard: $54,000
- Tony Martin: $56,000 (includes $28,000 win bonus) def. Ryan LaFlare: $33,000

== Records set ==
At the T-Mobile Arena, the event drew an attendance of 20,034 fans, generating a live gate revenue of $17.2 million. It set the record for the highest ever mixed martial arts attendance and live gate in Nevada. It also set the record for the biggest MMA pay-per-view event, with 2.4 million buys in the United States.

== Viewership ==
In Nurmagomedov's home country of Russia, the fight set the viewership record for the country's most-watched MMA event. On Russian channel Match TV, where the event began airing at 05:00 MSK and the Nurmagomedov-McGregor fight after 07:00 MSK, the fight was watched by more than 4 million viewers and reached a peak viewership rating of 67.5% for the time slot in the capital Moscow. In the United Kingdom, the fight was watched by 1,282,500 viewers on pay television subscription channel BT Sport 1, including 260,700 viewers for the live 01:00 broadcast and 1,021,800 viewers for the 06:00 replay.

== Nurmagomedov–McGregor post-fight controversy ==
Seconds after the fight, Nurmagomedov hurled his mouthpiece towards McGregor’s corner, then proceeded to climb out of the octagon and charged toward McGregor's cornerman Dillon Danis. Soon after, McGregor and Abubakar Nurmagomedov (cousin of Khabib) also tried to climb out of the octagon, but a scuffle broke out between them. Back in the octagon, McGregor was then attacked by two of Nurmagomedov's cornermen: Zubaira Tukhugov and Esed Emiragaev.

As a result of the incident, Nurmagomedov's payment for the fight was withheld by the Nevada State Athletic Commission (NSAC) pending an investigation into his actions. Tukhugov was scheduled to fight on October 27 at UFC Fight Night: Volkan vs. Smith against Artem Lobov, McGregor's teammate who was confronted by Nurmagomedov in April 2018.

Nurmagomedov appeared at the post-fight interview and apologized to the NSAC, saying he was provoked by the McGregor team's trash-talk targeting his family, nation, and religion, as well as the UFC 223 bus incident.

The NSAC filed a formal complaint against both McGregor and Nurmagomedov and the final hearing was initially scheduled to take place in November. On October 12, they announced both fighters received a suspension for ten days come October 15 and a hearing would be held on October 24. On October 24, the NSAC unanimously voted to release half of Nurmagomedov's payout immediately. The commission also voted to issue temporary suspensions for both fighters and ordered them to appear in person for a further hearing in December to resolve the case.

On January 29, 2019, the NSAC announced a nine-month suspension for Nurmagomedov and a $500,000 fine. The agreement also includes a potential suspension reduction of up to three months if he delivers to the commission a public service announcement on anti-bullying. To receive the reduction, the commission must approve the PSA and its distribution plan. Additionally, Nurmagomedov can only receive credit based on the time he submits the PSA. McGregor was suspended for six months and given a $50,000 fine. In separate agreements, Abubakar Nurmagomedov and Tukhugov were each suspended one year for their roles in the melee. All suspensions are retroactive to the day of the event. A few days later, Nurmagomedov stated that he would not opt to do the PSA stating "The state of Nevada is where drugs, prostitution and gambling are officially permitted. Let them work on themselves." Danis was suspended for seven months and fined $7,500, also retroactive to the day of the event. On May 22, 2019, NSAC reduced the suspensions by 35 days, which allowed Abubakar Nurmagomedov and Tukhugov to be eligible to compete again on September 1, 2019.

== See also ==
- List of UFC events
- 2018 in UFC
- List of current UFC fighters
