= Chris Cope =

American mixed martial arts fighter

- Born: March 5, 1983 (age 43); Carmel Valley, California, United States
- Other names: C-Murder
- Height: 6 ft 1 in (1.85 m)
- Weight: 170 lb (77 kg; 12 st)
- Division: Welterweight; Middleweight
- Reach: 72 in (183 cm)
- Fighting out of: San Diego, California, United States
- Team: The Arena/Arena MMA
- Rank: Black belt in Taekwondo; Brown belt in Brazilian jiu-jitsu
- Years active: 2007–2017

Mixed martial arts record
- Total: 12
- Wins: 8
- By knockout: 4
- By submission: 1
- By decision: 3
- Losses: 4
- By knockout: 3
- By submission: 1

Other information
- Mixed martial arts record from Sherdog

Christopher Cope (born March 5, 1983) is a former American mixed martial artist who competed in the welterweight division. He was a competitor on The Ultimate Fighter: Team Lesnar vs. Team dos Santos, and has also competed for the UFC as well as Strikeforce.

== Background ==
Born and raised in Carmel Valley, California, Chris Cope began training in Kempo Karate when he was eight years old before progressing into Taekwondo. While at Carmel High School, he added Boxing to his game and began to fight on the local mixed martial arts circuit. Cope was one of only four juniors to earn a spot on the 1999–2000 Carmel High Varsity basketball team, which featured several future college players. He also played baseball all four years of high school.

In April 2000, Cope participated in a week-long trip to the California high desert at Anza Borrego and Joshua Tree. This trip, which combined intense physical training with deep spiritual reflection, was to have a profound effect on Cope's athletic and philosophical development. Following high school, Cope graduated from The University of California at Santa Barbara where he earned a degree in sociology.

== Mixed martial arts career ==
=== Early career ===
He fought on the amateur circuit and earned the International Kickboxing Federation California cruiserweight title in 2004. Soon after, Cope committed himself to further developing his mixed martial arts repertoire and began grappling with jiu-jitsu expert Jeff Glover to further round out his overall skills. He earned his brown belt in Brazilian Jiu-Jitsu and black belt in tae-kwon-do.

Upon completion of his courses in 2005, Cope joined AKA MMA and trained with the likes of Josh Koscheck, Phil Baroni and Mike Swick. Three months later he drove south to San Diego and began training with K. J. Noons and Tyrone Glover and, shortly after, turned pro where he amassed a 4–1 overall record.

The self-proclaimed gym rat has settled into Arena MMA after bouncing around several gyms in California. Cope currently works at a local San Diego law firm but still manages to train two times a day, six days a week.

=== The Ultimate Fighter ===
Cope had signed with the UFC in 2011 to compete on The Ultimate Fighter: Team Lesnar vs. Team dos Santos.

Cope was the fifth pick on Team Lesnar and tenth overall. dos Santos had selected Cope to face the heavy favorite, Javier Torres, for the second preliminary bout. After a three-round battle, Cope was declared the winner by unanimous decision.

Cope's quarter-final match was against Team dos Santos' Shamar Bailey. Cope defeated Bailey after two rounds via unanimous decision. Cope showed good takedown defense along with immediately following his corner's advice throughout the fight.

In the semifinals Cope was defeated by Ramsey Nijem via TKO in the second round, knocking him out of the tournament.

=== Ultimate Fighting Championship ===
Even though he lost in the semifinals, Cope remained signed after the show. He made his official UFC debut June 4, 2011 on The Ultimate Fighter 13 Finale card, fighting against fellow semifinalist and teammate, Chuck O'Neil. He won the fight via unanimous decision.

Cope faced promotional newcomer Che Mills on November 5, 2011, at UFC 138. He lost the fight via TKO .

Cope next fought Matt Brown on February 4, 2012, at UFC 143. He lost the fight via TKO in the second round.

Following his loss to Brown, Cope was released from the UFC.

=== Post UFC ===
Cope had signed with Native Fighting Championship, a region organization, close to his home.

Chris Cope currently resides in New Hyde Park, Long Island, New York. He lives behind a cemetery with an old war veteran. He currently ranks as the #17 Membership Specialist at the UFC Gym Long Island.

Chris Cope faced Elijah Harshburger for the vacant ROC Welterweight Championship at Ring of Combat 47 on January 24, 2014. Though Cope was the heavy favorite coming into the fight, he lost the fight via rear-naked choke.

Since retiring from fighting Cope has moved to Long Island, New York. He coaches a variety of martial arts including kickboxing, Thai boxing and wrestling with his "Team Xtreme" fighters for both Kickboxing and Mixed Martial Arts at Unique Fitness Xtreme in Shirley, New York.

== Championships and Accomplishments ==
- Native Fighting Championship
  - NFC Welterweight Championship (One time, current)

== Mixed martial arts record ==
Professional record breakdown
12 matches	8 wins	4 losses
By knockout	4	3
By submission	1	1
By decision	3	0
Draws	0	
No contests	0	

Res.	Record	Opponent	Method	Event	Date	Round	Time	Location	Notes
Loss	8–4	Elijah Harshbarger	Submission (rear-naked choke)	Ring of Combat 47	January 24, 2014	3	1:33	Atlantic City, New Jersey, United States	For the vacant ROC Welterweight Championship
Win	8–3	Tlowa Madadafo	TKO (punches)	Native Fighting Championship 14	August 11, 2012	1	2:52	Campo, California, United States	Won the NFC Welterweight Championship.
Win	7–3	Kyle Thier	TKO (punches)	Native Fighting Championship 13	June 22, 2012	2	1:21	Campo, California, United States	
Win	6–3	Cole Thomas	Submission (guillotine choke)	Native Fighting Championship 12	April 13, 2012	1	1:39	Campo, California, United States	
Loss	5–3	Matt Brown	TKO (punches)	UFC 143	February 4, 2012	2	1:19	Las Vegas, Nevada, United States	
Loss	5–2	Che Mills	TKO (knees and punches)	UFC 138	November 5, 2011	1	0:40	Birmingham, England, United Kingdom	
Win	5–1	Chuck O'Neil	Decision (unanimous)	The Ultimate Fighter 13 Finale	June 4, 2011	3	5:00	Las Vegas, Nevada, United States	
Win	4–1	Ron Keslar	TKO (head kick and punches)	Strikeforce: Fedor vs. Werdum	June 26, 2010	2	4:32	San Jose, California, United States	
Loss	3–1	Josh Samman	KO (punches)	Moon Management: Ubersmash 2	January 23, 2010	1	N/A	Tallahassee, Florida, United States	
Win	3–0	Armando Montoya Jr.	KO (head kick)	SBP: Boxing at the Beach	July 17, 2009	2	N/A	Redondo Beach, California, United States	
Win	2–0	Marcos Gonzalez	Decision (unanimous)	Battle in the Ballroom	March 7, 2009	3	5:00	Irvine, California, United States	
Win	1–0	Jermaine Wilson	Decision (unanimous)	TC 24: War in the Armory	November 4, 2007	3	N/A	Oceanside, California, United States	

== See also ==
- List of male mixed martial artists
- List of Brazilian jiu-jitsu practitioners
