= Danny Downes =

American mixed martial arts fighter

- Born: April 8, 1986 (age 40); Chicago, Illinois, United States
- Other names: Danny Boy, The Syndrome
- Height: 5 ft 11 in (1.80 m)
- Weight: 155 lb (70 kg; 11.1 st)
- Division: Lightweight
- Reach: 72.0 in (183 cm)
- Stance: Orthodox
- Fighting out of: Milwaukee, Wisconsin
- Team: Roufusport
- Years active: 2007–2011

Mixed martial arts record
- Total: 11
- Wins: 8
- By knockout: 5
- By submission: 1
- By decision: 2
- Losses: 3
- By submission: 1
- By decision: 2

Other information
- University: Marquette University
- Mixed martial arts record from Sherdog

Daniel William Downes (born April 8, 1986) is a retired American mixed martial artist. Even after his retirement, Downes has still continued to stick around the sport of MMA. He became what some call a "fighter turned writer", as he now writes for various MMA media outlets, including MMAjunkie.com

== Mixed martial arts career ==
Since turning professional in 2007, Downes has competed for several smaller organizations, while compiling an undefeated record and obtaining wins in promotions such as King of the Cage, with all of his fights taking place in his native Wisconsin. Downes is a training partner of former WEC champion Anthony Pettis under the tutelage of Duke Roufus.

Downes handed David Kless his first professional loss at a Gladiators Cage Fighting event via unanimous decision. Downes picked up the biggest win of his career at KOTC Turbulence 2, defeating Bruce Johnson via first round TKO.

=== World Extreme Cagefighting ===
Downes made his WEC debut against Chris Horodecki, replacing an injured Ed Ratcliff with only a few days notice on June 20, 2010 at WEC 49. WEC commissioner Reed Harris confirmed the addition of Downes to the card on The Daily Line, adding that the WEC had had their eye on Downes for a while. He lost the fight via submission in the third round.

Downes fought Chinese prospect Zhang Tiequan on December 16, 2010 at WEC 53. Downes won the fight via unanimous decision (29-28, 30-27, 29-28).

=== Ultimate Fighting Championship ===
On October 28, 2010, World Extreme Cagefighting merged with the Ultimate Fighting Championship. As part of the merger, all WEC fighters were transferred to the UFC.

Downes faced Jeremy Stephens on June 4, 2011 at The Ultimate Fighter 13 Finale, replacing an injured Jonathan Brookins. He lost the fight via unanimous decision.

Downes next fought Ramsey Nijem on October 29, 2011 at UFC 137. He lost the fight via unanimous decision and was subsequently released from the promotion.

Shortly afterwards, Downes retired from the sport.

== Personal life ==
Downes, a native of Chicago, is a graduate of Marquette University with degrees in International Affairs and German.

== Mixed martial arts record ==
Professional record breakdown
11 matches	8 wins	3 losses
By knockout	5	0
By submission	1	1
By decision	2	2

Res.	Record	Opponent	Method	Event	Date	Round	Time	Location	Notes
Loss	8–3	Ramsey Nijem	Decision (unanimous)	UFC 137	October 29, 2011	3	5:00	Las Vegas, Nevada, United States	
Loss	8–2	Jeremy Stephens	Decision (unanimous)	The Ultimate Fighter 13 Finale	June 4, 2011	3	5:00	Las Vegas, Nevada, United States	
Win	8–1	Taurean Bogguess	Submission (triangle choke)	NAFC: Mayhem	May 6, 2011	1	3:24	Milwaukee, Wisconsin, United States	
Win	7–1	Zhang Tiequan	Decision (unanimous)	WEC 53	December 16, 2010	3	5:00	Glendale, Arizona, United States	
Loss	6–1	Chris Horodecki	Submission (rear-naked choke)	WEC 49	June 20, 2010	3	1:09	Edmonton, Alberta, Canada	
Win	6–0	Bruce Johnson	TKO (punches)	KOTC: Turbulence 2	April 24, 2010	1	4:56	Lac du Flambeau, Wisconsin, United States	
Win	5–0	David Kless	Decision (unanimous)	GCF: Strength and Honor	November 7, 2009	3	5:00	West Allis, Wisconsin, United States	
Win	4–0	Jake Omen	TKO (punches)	GCF: The Good, the Bad and the Ugly	March 14, 2009	2	4:24	Milwaukee, Wisconsin, United States	
Win	3–0	Gustavo Rodriguez	TKO (punches)	Evolution Fighting Championships 6	January 24, 2009	1	2:19	Fond du Lac, Wisconsin, United States	
Win	2–0	Mike Sandez	TKO (punches)	GFS: Season's Beatings	December 13, 2008	1	3:14	Milwaukee, Wisconsin, United States	
Win	1–0	John Lovejoy	TKO (punches)	GFS: Caged Colosseum	October 6, 2007	1	1:00	West Allis, Wisconsin, United States	
