= Shamar Bailey =

American mixed martial arts fighter

- Born: September 22, 1982 (age 44); Chicago, Illinois, United States
- Other names: The Watchman
- Nationality: American
- Height: 5 ft 8 in (1.73 m)
- Weight: 170 lb (77 kg; 12 st)
- Division: Welterweight; Lightweight
- Reach: 75 in (190 cm)
- Fighting out of: Indianapolis, Indiana, United States
- Team: Integrated Fighting Academy
- Years active: 2006–2014

Mixed martial arts record
- Total: 27
- Wins: 16
- By knockout: 5
- By submission: 3
- By decision: 7
- By disqualification: 1
- Losses: 11
- By knockout: 6
- By submission: 1
- By decision: 4

Other information
- Mixed martial arts record from Sherdog

Shamar Bailey is a retired American mixed martial artist who competed in the Lightweight division. A professional MMA competitor since 2006, Bailey has formerly competed for the UFC, Strikeforce, Bellator, M-1 Global, and was a competitor on The Ultimate Fighter: Team Lesnar vs. Team dos Santos.

== Background ==
The son of a devoted pastor father, Shamar Bailey was raised in a strict Christian household which moved him across state lines six times before his 20th birthday. These moves were due to his dad's full-time corporate re-locations. Bailey was homeschooled until his senior year of high school when he elected to attend the local Greenwood, Indiana, public school. During his senior season at Center Grove High School, Bailey excelled on the varsity wrestling team, going undefeated over the course of the year. After high school, Bailey attended Maranatha Bible College and majored in church-ministry.

== Mixed martial arts career ==
=== Early career ===
Building on his impressive senior year at Center Grove, Bailey entered Division III Maranatha Baptist Bible College in Wisconsin where he continued to thrive on the mats, earning All-Conference three times and being named NCAA National Qualifier. The Church Ministries major returned to Indianapolis after graduation and began to train with Jake O'Brien and Chris Lytle to stay active as he mulled over an offer to move to Colorado Springs to train at the Olympic Training Center with the World Team training camp. Bailey began to feel more comfortable in the sport and decided to decline the invitation in order to pursue mixed martial arts and soon after, in 2006, Bailey had his first professional fight, a first-round TKO victory over Jason Cook.

For the past four years, Bailey has trained with Integrated Fighting Academy while also working part-time for the Indianapolis Fire Department with Chris Lytle. During this time, he has earned notable victories over John Kolosci and Waachiim Spiritwolf.

=== Strikeforce ===
Bailey made his Strikeforce on November 7, 2009, when he faced John Kolosci at Strikeforce: Fedor vs. Rogers. He won his debut via unanimous decision. Bailey then replaced an injured Bryan Travers, as he fought Justin Wilcox at Strikeforce Challengers 7 on March 26, 2010. He lost via unanimous decision and was subsequently released.

=== The Ultimate Fighter ===
In 2011, it was announced that Bailey had signed with the UFC to compete in The Ultimate Fighter: Team Lesnar vs. Team dos Santos.

Bailey was picked first on Team dos Santos and second overall. In the first preliminary bout of the season, Bailey was selected to fight Nordin Asrih. Bailey used his wrestling to control Asrih on the ground and win a clear-cut decision.

In the quarterfinals, he fought Chris Cope but lost via unanimous decision after two rounds. After the fight Shamar was visibly upset with the decision, saying numerous times, "he fought well, but not that good".

=== Ultimate Fighting Championship ===
Even though he lost in the quarterfinals, Bailey remained signed after the show. He made his official UFC debut June 4, 2011 on The Ultimate Fighter 13 Finale card, fighting against fellow quarterfinalist and teammate, Ryan McGillivray. He won the fight via unanimous decision.

Bailey dropped to Lightweight in order to face Evan Dunham at UFC Fight Night 25. He lost the fight via unanimous decision.

Bailey faced Danny Castillo on November 19, 2011, at UFC 139. During the official weigh ins, Bailey failed to make the weight limit for the Lightweight division. Bailey came in three pounds over, which resulted being fined 20 percent of his earnings, and the bout took place at a Catchweight of 158 lb. He lost the fight via TKO in the first round. After the loss to Castillo, Bailey was released from the promotion.

=== Post UFC ===
Bailey was scheduled to face UFC veteran Karo Parisyan at ShoFight 20 on June 16, 2012, for the vacant ShoFight Welterweight Championship. However, due to a medical suspension, Bailey was pulled from the fight and replaced by John Gunderson

=== Xtreme Fighting Championships ===
Bailey faced Bellator veteran Luis Santos at XFC 23 on April 19, 2013. He lost the fight via TKO at just over a minute into the first round.

=== Retirement ===
On October 7, 2014, Bailey announced his retirement from MMA competition.

== Mixed martial arts record ==
Professional record breakdown
27 matches	16 wins	11 losses
By knockout	5	6
By submission	3	1
By decision	7	4
By disqualification	1	0

Res.	Record	Opponent	Method	Event	Date	Round	Time	Location	Notes
Loss	16–11	Mark Stoddard	TKO (punches)	Pinnacle Combat XVII	October 4, 2014	1	1:44	Cedar Rapids, Iowa, United States	For the Pinnacle Combat Welterweight Championship.
Loss	16–10	Kevin Nowaczyk	Decision (unanimous)	HFC 19	February 8, 2014	3	5:00	Valparaiso, Indiana, United States	
Win	16–9	Jordin Hinman	Decision (unanimous)	APFC 11: Champion vs. Champion	June 22, 2013	3	5:00	McCook, Illinois, United States	
Loss	15–9	Luis Santos	TKO (head kick and punches)	XFC 23: Louisville Slugfest	April 19, 2013	1	1:02	Louisville, Kentucky, United States	
Win	15–8	Gideon Ray	Decision (unanimous)	Flawless FC 2: Hated	December 15, 2012	3	5:00	Chicago, Illinois, United States	
Win	14–8	David Overfield	TKO (punches)	Colosseum Combat 22	September 29, 2012	2	0:18	Kokomo, Indiana, United States	
Loss	13–8	Joshua Williams	Submission (armbar)	Warfare 6 - Fight Night	August 24, 2012	2	2:25	Myrtle Beach, South Carolina, United States	
Loss	13–7	Lucas Pimenta Borges	TKO (punches)	Ultimate Warrior Fighting: Tournament of Warriors	May 4, 2012	1	2:30	Corpus Christi, Texas, United States	
Loss	13–6	Josh Shockley	Decision (unanimous)	Bellator 60	March 9, 2012	3	5:00	Hammond, Indiana, United States	165 lb Catchweight bout.
Win	13–5	Darrell Smith	Submission (D'arce choke)	Colosseum Combat XIX	January 7, 2012	3	3:53	Kokomo, Indiana, United States	
Loss	12–5	Danny Castillo	TKO (punches)	UFC 139	November 19, 2011	1	4:52	San Jose, California, United States	158 lb Catchweight bout; Bailey missed weight.
Loss	12–4	Evan Dunham	Decision (unanimous)	UFC Fight Night: Shields vs. Ellenberger	September 17, 2011	3	5:00	New Orleans, Louisiana, United States	Lightweight debut.
Win	12–3	Ryan McGillivray	Decision (unanimous)	The Ultimate Fighter 13 Finale	June 4, 2011	3	5:00	Las Vegas, Nevada, United States	
Loss	11–3	Kurt Kinser	TKO (cut)	LOF 41: Damage Incorporated	September 10, 2010	1	5:00	Indianapolis, Indiana, United States	
Loss	11–2	Justin Wilcox	Decision (unanimous)	Strikeforce Challengers: Johnson vs. Mahe	March 26, 2010	3	5:00	Fresno, California, United States	160 lb Catchweight bout.
Win	11–1	John Kolosci	Decision (unanimous)	Strikeforce: Fedor vs. Rogers	November 7, 2009	3	5:00	Hoffman Estates, Illinois, United States	
Win	10–1	Raymond Jarman	TKO (punches)	M-1 Challenge 18: Netherlands Day Two	August 16, 2009	2	3:15	Hilversum, Netherlands	
Win	9–1	Rodney Sleepers	Decision (unanimous)	KOTC: The Renewal	June 20, 2009	3	5:00	Indianapolis, Indiana, United States	
Win	8–1	James George	Submission (guillotine choke)	UFL: Fight Night at The Murat	December 13, 2008	1	2:04	Indianapolis, Indiana, United States	
Loss	7–1	Roger Bowling	TKO (punches)	RFL: Hostile Takeover	April 26, 2008	1	0:28	Louisville, Kentucky, United States	
Win	7–0	Gabriel Miranda	DQ	Warriors Collide 2	February 9, 2008	3	3:30	Pueblo, Colorado, United States	
Win	6–0	Waachiim Spiritwolf	Decision (unanimous)	Revolution Fight League 1	December 1, 2007	3	5:00	Louisville, Kentucky, United States	
Win	5–0	Matt Delanoit	Decision (unanimous)	UFL: Fight Night at Conseco Fieldhouse	May 19, 2007	3	5:00	Indianapolis, Indiana, United States	
Win	4–0	Mike Firari	TKO (punches)	Madtown Throwdown 10	January 12, 2007	N/A	N/A	Madison, Wisconsin, United States	
Win	3–0	Salazar Sanchez	TKO (punches)	LOF 12: Black Tie Battles	December 31, 2006	2	2:39	Indianapolis, Indiana, United States	
Win	2–0	Courtney Ray	Submission	United Fight League 3	October 20, 2006	1	N/A	Indianapolis, Indiana, United States	
Win	1–0	Jason Cook	TKO (punches)	United Fight League 2	August 25, 2006	1	N/A	Indianapolis, Indiana, United States	Welterweight debut.

== Amateur mixed martial arts record ==
Professional record breakdown
1 match	1 win	0 losses
By knockout	0	0
By submission	0	0
By decision	1	0

Res.	Record	Opponent	Method	Event	Date	Round	Time	Location	Notes
Win	1–0	Rod Montoya	Decision (unanimous)	United Fight League 1	June 23, 2006	3	5:00	Indianapolis, Indiana, United States	
