= Anthony Pettis =

American mixed martial artist (born 1987)

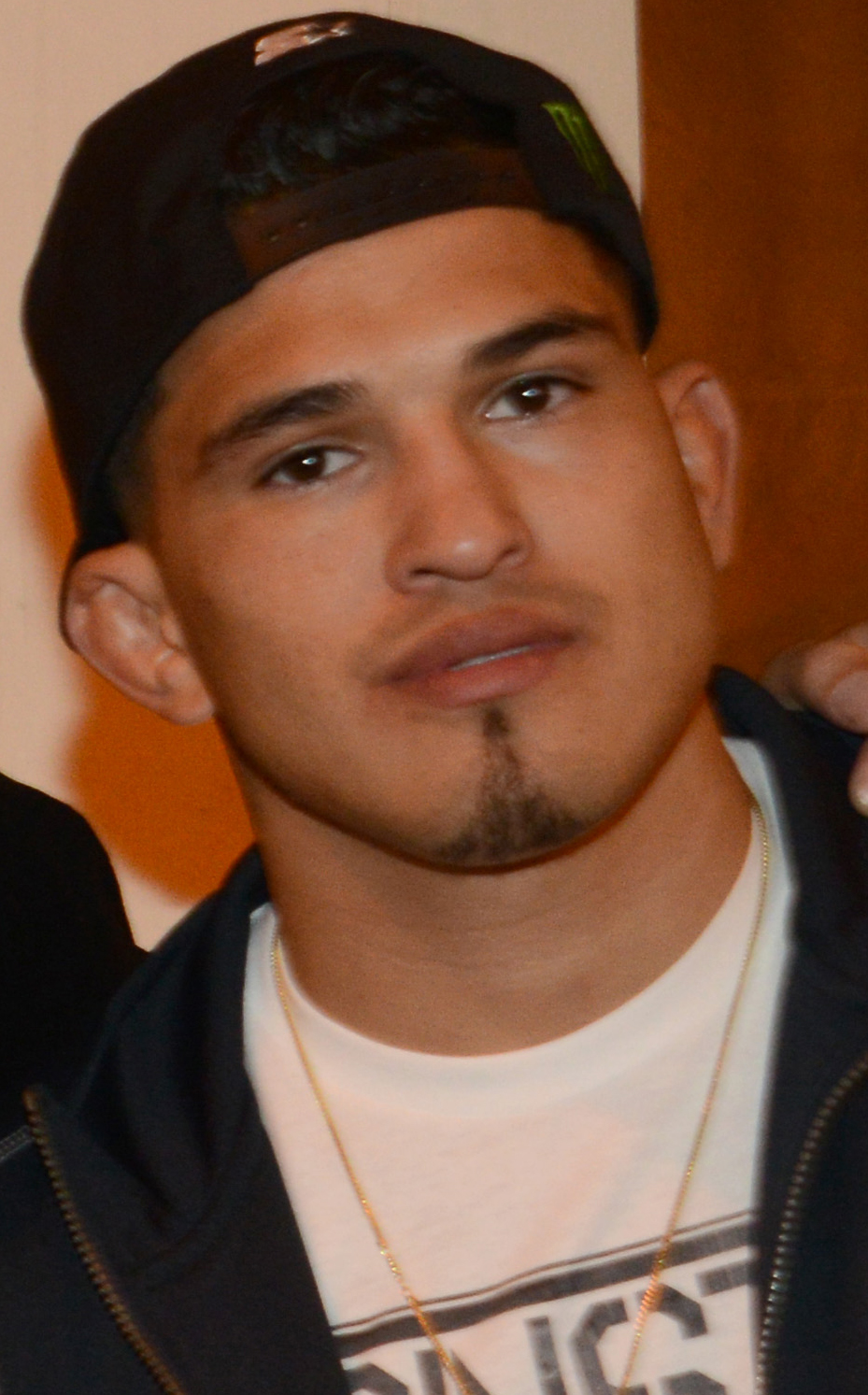
- Anthony Pettis in 2016
- Born: January 27, 1987 (age 39); Milwaukee, Wisconsin, U.S.
- Nickname: Showtime
- Height: 5 ft 10 in (178 cm)
- Weight: 155 lb (70 kg; 11 st 1 lb)
- Division: Welterweight (170 lbs) (2008, 2019–2020); Lightweight (155 lbs) (2007–2016, 2017–2018, 2020, 2021–present); Featherweight (145 lbs) (2016); Cruiserweight (2023)
- Reach: 72 1/2 in (184 cm)
- Fighting out of: Milwaukee, Wisconsin, U.S.
- Team: Roufusport
- Trainer: Duke Roufus
- Rank: 3rd dan black belt in Taekwondo; Black belt in Brazilian Jiu-Jitsu under Daniel Wanderley
- Years active: 2007–present

Professional boxing record
- Total: 2
- Wins: 1
- Losses: 1

Mixed martial arts record
- Total: 39
- Wins: 25
- By knockout: 11
- By submission: 8
- By decision: 6
- Losses: 14
- By knockout: 2
- By submission: 3
- By decision: 9

Amateur record
- Total: 3
- Wins: 3
- By knockout: 1

Other information
- Notable relatives: Sergio Pettis (brother)
- Boxing record from BoxRec
- Mixed martial arts record from Sherdog

Anthony Pettis (born January 27, 1987) is an American professional mixed martial artist, and professional boxer. Pettis formerly fought in the Welterweight, Lightweight, and Featherweight divisions of the Ultimate Fighting Championship (UFC) and Professional Fighters League (PFL). He is a former UFC Lightweight Champion. Pettis was also the final WEC Lightweight Champion prior to the promotion being merged into the UFC.

== Early life ==
Pettis was born on January 27, 1987, in Milwaukee, Wisconsin, to Annette (née Garcia) and Eugene Pettis Jr. He grew up in the south side of Milwaukee, along with his older brother, Reynaldo Pettis and younger brother, Sergio Pettis, who fights in the flyweight division.

Pettis is of Mexican and Puerto Rican ancestry. His grandfather, Eugenio Pérez, anglicized the family name from Pérez to Pettis to avoid discrimination. Pettis attended Dominican High School.

He started training in taekwondo and boxing at the age of 5. When he went to train mixed martial arts at Roufusport, he already had a 3rd degree black belt in taekwondo. He later trained in capoeira.

On November 12, 2003, Pettis' father was stabbed to death by a robber at a friend's house. Pettis felt detached as a result and didn't practice martial arts for several years. After his older brother became the first male in the family to graduate high school, Pettis was encouraged by a school nun to enroll at the Kenosha Fire Academy and subsequently became a firefighter.

== Mixed martial arts career ==
=== Early career ===
Pettis began training in MMA in 2006 after an open house at Roufusport MMA Academy. After compiling a 3-0 record as an amateur, he made his professional MMA debut in January 2007 and won via submission in 36 seconds. Pettis compiled a record of 8–0 in all fights being held by Adam Sandoval and Duke Roufus before debuting with the World Extreme Cagefighting (WEC), winning the Gladiator Fighting Series Lightweight Championship. His last fight before joining the WEC was a short notice welterweight bout.

Pettis also has a professional kickboxing background. In MMA, Pettis is known for his smooth and technical fighting style, as well as his athletic feats and wide range of techniques.

Pettis was coached by kickboxer and MMA trainer Duke Roufus and is a member of Roufusport where he trained with fighters Alan Belcher, Erik Koch, Ben Rothwell, Ben Askren, and Danny Downes.

Before joining the WEC, Pettis went to The Ultimate Fighter: United States vs. United Kingdom tryouts but did not make it to the show.

=== WEC ===
==== 2009 ====
Pettis was expected to make his promotional debut against Anthony Njokuani on April 5, 2009, at WEC 40. However, Pettis pulled out of the fight with a hand injury and was replaced by Bart Palaszewski.

Pettis made his WEC debut at WEC 41 on June 7, 2009, where he defeated Mike Campbell via first-round triangle choke.

He was then expected to fight Rob McCullough at WEC 44 on November 18, 2009, but was pulled off the card with an undisclosed injury.

Pettis suffered his first professional loss on December 19, 2009, at WEC 45, dropping a split decision to Bart Palaszewski.

==== 2010 ====
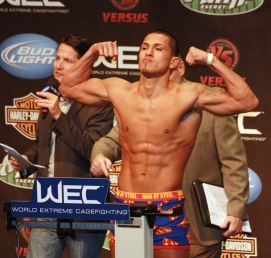
Pettis at the WEC 53 weigh-ins

Pettis rebounded from the loss with a head-kick KO victory over Danny Castillo on March 6, 2010, at WEC 47, earning Knockout of the Night honors. Training for the fight, as well as Pettis's family life, were both documented on an episode of the MTV show World of Jenks.

Pettis suffered almost no damage in the bout with Castillo and made a quick return at WEC 48 on April 24, 2010, against Alex Karalexis, replacing Zack Micklewright on short notice. He won the fight via submission in the second round.

Pettis faced Shane Roller on August 18, 2010, at WEC 50. Pettis surprised many by taking down Roller multiple times and frustrating him with fast-paced scrambles. Pettis displayed diversity in his striking with two Capoeira kicks, the martelo and the aú batido. After several submission attempts, Pettis secured a fight-ending triangle choke in the closing seconds of the fight, earning a Submission of the Night bonus.

His last WEC fight came against Benson Henderson on December 16, 2010, at WEC 53 for the WEC Lightweight Championship. The fight was closely contested throughout, providing back and forth action, both standing and on the ground. Late in the fifth round Pettis ran up the cage, jumped off it, then connected with a flying switch kick that knocked down Henderson. Sports reporters later named this the Showtime Kick. Pettis won the fight via unanimous decision (48–47, 49–46, 48–47) to become the final WEC Lightweight Champion. The fight was also awarded as Fight of the Night which won Henderson and Pettis an extra $10,000.

=== UFC ===
==== 2010 ====
In October 2010, World Extreme Cagefighting merged with the Ultimate Fighting Championship (UFC). As part of the merger, a majority of the WEC fighters were transferred to the UFC.

Pettis was expected to face the winner of Frankie Edgar and Gray Maynard, which took place at UFC 125. However, the bout was declared a draw, and Edgar–Maynard 3 was scheduled for UFC 130, but both fighters sustained injuries before the fight, which was postponed.

==== 2011 ====
Instead of waiting for the winner of Edgar/Maynard 3, Pettis faced Clay Guida on June 4 at The Ultimate Fighter 13 Finale. He lost the fight via unanimous decision.

Pettis next faced Jeremy Stephens on October 8 at UFC 136. Pettis won the closely contested bout via unanimous decision.

==== 2012 ====
Pettis faced Joe Lauzon on February 25 at UFC 144. He won the fight via knockout in round one. His performance earned Knockout of the Night honors.

==== 2013 ====
After spending the majority of 2012 recovering from a litany of injuries, Pettis faced Donald Cerrone on January 26, 2013, at UFC on Fox 6. He won the fight via TKO in round one. The performance also earned Pettis Knockout of the Night honors. After the victory, Dana White said he was "sold" on Pettis and admitted that after Benson Henderson against Gilbert Melendez on UFC on Fox 7, Pettis was to be the next to fight for the lightweight title.

On February 5, it was announced that Pettis would not wait for a title shot at lightweight, and would instead be dropping down to 145 pounds to challenge featherweight champion, José Aldo on August 3 at UFC 163. However, on June 14, Dana White announced that Pettis had pulled out of the Aldo bout with a serious knee injury, and that Aldo would instead defend the title against Chan Sung Jung.

A few weeks later after a quick recovery, it was announced on July 12 that Pettis would replace TJ Grant in a rematch for the UFC Lightweight Championship against Benson Henderson on August 31 at UFC 164. Pettis defeated Henderson via armbar submission in the first round to claim the UFC Lightweight Title. The win also earned Pettis his first Submission of the Night bonus award in the UFC.

Pettis was expected to make his first title defense against TJ Grant on December 14 at UFC on Fox 9. However, Grant revealed in mid-September that he had yet to be medically cleared after suffering a concussion in training and would not be eligible to compete on December 14. Pettis was then expected to face Josh Thomson at the event. However, the bout was canceled in mid-November after Pettis pulled out of the bout citing a knee injury.

==== 2014 ====
Pettis was selected to serve as a coach on The Ultimate Fighter 20, opposite Gilbert Melendez and the two would face each other at UFC 181 on December 6, 2014. Pettis won the fight via guillotine choke in the second round, becoming the first man to finish Melendez. He also earned a Performance of the Night bonus award.

==== 2015 ====
Pettis faced Rafael dos Anjos on March 14 at UFC 185. He lost the bout and the championship by unanimous decision.

Pettis was expected to face Myles Jury on July 25, 2015, at UFC on Fox 16. However, Pettis pulled out of the bout citing another injury and was replaced by Edson Barboza.

==== 2016 ====
Pettis faced Eddie Alvarez on January 17, 2016, at UFC Fight Night 81. He lost the back-and-forth bout via split decision.

Pettis faced Edson Barboza on April 23, 2016, at UFC 197. Pettis lost the fight via unanimous decision.

On the heels of a three-fight losing streak, Pettis announced in June 2016 his intention to drop to featherweight for his next fight. Pettis fought Charles Oliveira in his featherweight debut on August 27, 2016, at UFC on Fox 21. After another back-and-forth fight which saw Oliveira take his back multiple times, Pettis submitted Oliveira via guillotine choke in the 3rd round.

Pettis faced Max Holloway for the interim UFC Featherweight Championship on December 10, 2016, at UFC 206. At the weigh-ins, Pettis came in at 148 pounds, three pounds over the featherweight limit of 145 lbs. for a championship fight. As a result, in the event that Pettis were to win the fight with Holloway, he would be ineligible for the UFC championship. Pettis was also fined 20% of his purse, which went to Holloway and the bout proceeded at a catchweight. Pettis was the first fighter to miss weight for a UFC championship bout since Travis Lutter at UFC 67 in February 2007. He lost the fight via TKO in the third round.

==== 2017 ====
Pettis faced Jim Miller in a lightweight bout on July 8, 2017, at UFC 213. He won the fight by unanimous decision.

Pettis faced Dustin Poirier on November 11, 2017, at UFC Fight Night 120. Pettis lost the fight via submission due to a rib injury suffered from a body triangle applied by Poirier. This fight also won him the Fight of the Night bonus award.

==== 2018 ====
Pettis was expected to face Michael Chiesa on April 7, 2018, at UFC 223, but the bout was canceled two days before the event after Chiesa was injured in an incident in which Conor McGregor hurled a dolly through the window of the bus Chiesa was in. The shards of the shattered window cut Chiesa, who was deemed unfit to fight by the athletic commission.

On April 6, 2018, UFC Featherweight Champion Max Holloway was declared medically unfit by the New York State Athletic Commission and was pulled from his main event fight against Khabib Nurmagomedov. Pettis accepted the opportunity to fight Khabib Nurmagomedov at UFC 223 for the lightweight championship on a day's notice with the hope of getting $1,000,000 for the fight. The UFC declined to pay him this much money and the deal fell through.

The bout with Chiesa was rescheduled to UFC 226. At weight-ins, Chiesa weighed in at 157.5 pounds, 1.5 pounds over the non-title lightweight limit of 156 pounds. As a result, the fight proceeded catchweight bout with Chiesa forfeiting 30% of his purse to Pettis. Pettis won the fight via triangle armbar submission in the second round. This fight earned him the Performance of the Night award.

Pettis faced Tony Ferguson on October 6, 2018, at UFC 229. After a back-and-forth fight, Pettis knocked down Ferguson in round two, but subsequently broke his hand in the process, going on to lose by corner stoppage due to his injury before the third round. This fight earned him the Fight of the Night award.

==== 2019 ====
On January 19, 2019, it was announced that Pettis would be returning to Welterweight for the first time since 2008 to face Stephen Thompson. This fight served as the headliner of UFC on ESPN+ 6 on March 23, 2019. Thompson outstruck Pettis for most of the bout, however Pettis won the fight via knockout late round two, becoming the first man to knockout Thompson in his MMA and kickboxing careers. This win earned him the Performance of the Night award.

Pettis faced Nate Diaz on August 17, 2019, at UFC 241. He lost the fight via unanimous decision. Pettis blamed a hand laceration, received from a faulty USADA issued glass urine sample bottle, for the lackluster performance against diaz and subsequent loss. Pettis would file a lawsuit over the matter against USADA soon after the bout. later claiming he was financially compensated by the agency for the incident.

==== 2020 ====
Pettis faced Carlos Diego Ferreira in a lightweight bout on January 18, 2020, at UFC 246. He lost the fight via rear-naked choke submission in the second round.

Pettis faced Donald Cerrone in a rematch on May 9, 2020, at UFC 249. He won the fight via unanimous decision.

Pettis faced Alex Morono at UFC Fight Night: Thompson vs. Neal on December 19, 2020. He won the fight via unanimous decision. With this being the last remaining bout on Pettis' UFC contract, Pettis announced on December 22 that he was choosing not to accept a new offer from the UFC and would be testing the free agent market.

=== PFL ===
==== 2021 Season ====
Just one day after announcing he would be testing free agency, Pettis announced on December 23, 2020, that he has signed a multi-fight deal with the Professional Fighters League, and he would be competing as a lightweight in the 2021 season.

Pettis made his PFL debut against Clay Collard on April 23, 2021, at PFL 1. He lost the bout via unanimous decision.

Pettis was scheduled to face Alexander Martinez at PFL 4 on June 10, 2021. However, Pettis withdrew due to illness and Martinez faced Natan Schulte. Schulte's opponent Raush Manfio, faced Pettis at PFL 6 on June 25, 2021. Pettis lost the close bout via split decision.

==== 2022 Season ====
Pettis was scheduled to face Myles Price on April 23, 2022, at PFL 1. It was later announced that the bout would be rescheduled for PFL 3. Pettis submitted Price in the first round via triangle choke.

Pettis faced Stevie Ray on June 24, 2022, at PFL 5. He lost the fight via a modified body triangle submission in the second round.

Pettis rematched Stevie Ray in the semifinals of the Lightweight tournament on August 5, 2022, at PFL 7. Once again, Pettis lost the bout, this time via unanimous decision.

==== Global Fight League ====
On December 11, 2024, it was announced that Pettis was signed by Global Fight League.

Petis was scheduled to face Benson Henderson in the inaugural Global Fight League event on May 24, 2025 at GFL 1. However, all GFL events were cancelled indefinitely.

== Boxing career ==
On February 6, 2023, it was announced that Pettis would make his professional boxing debut on April 1, 2023, against former four-division boxing champion, Roy Jones Jr. at Gamebred Boxing 4. He won the bout by majority decision.

Pettis faced Chris Avila in a six-round light heavyweight bout at Honda Center in Anaheim, CA on July 6, 2024. He lost the bout by unanimous decision.

== Freestyle wrestling ==
Pettis was scheduled to make his Real American Freestyle debut against Donald Cerrone on November 28, 2026 at RAF 15. However, Cerrone withdrew for undisclosed reasons and was replaced by Arman Tsarukyan in what will be a RAF Middleweight Crossover Championship bout main event.

== In business and media ==
Along with business partners Duke Roufus and Scott Joffe, Pettis owns the Roufusport MMA Academy and the Showtime Sports Bar in Milwaukee.

Pettis along with Jon Jones, Urijah Faber, Joseph Benavidez, Mark Muñoz, Chad Mendes, and Scott Jorgensen starred in a Form Athletics (now owned by K-Swiss) commercial.

On December 2, 2013, Pettis received a Certificate of Achievement from the Governor of Wisconsin, Scott Walker.

On June 30, 2014, it was announced that Pettis signed a sponsorship deal with Reebok.

In the fall of 2014, Pettis was voted to be the first UFC champion to appear on the cover of General Mills' Wheaties box wearing his belt. The box appeared in stores in early 2015. However, when the box came out Anthony Pettis had already lost his belt to dos Anjos.

Pettis appeared on episode 4 of World of Jenks, where documentary maker Andrew Jenks lived with Pettis for a week before his fight against Danny Castillo at WEC 47. The episode gave an inside look into Pettis' fight preparations as well as giving insights into his family life.

== Personal life ==
Pettis has two daughters, one from a previous relationship and one with his current partner.

== Championships and accomplishments ==
- Ultimate Fighting Championship
  - UFC Lightweight Championship (One time)
    - One successful title defense
  - Fight of the Night (Two times) vs. Dustin Poirier and Tony Ferguson
  - Knockout of the Night (Two times) vs. Joe Lauzon and Donald Cerrone
  - Submission of the Night (One time) vs. Benson Henderson
  - Performance of the Night (Three times) vs. Gilbert Melendez, Michael Chiesa, and Stephen Thompson
  - UFC Honors Awards
    - 2019: Fan's Choice Comeback of the Year Nominee vs. Stephen Thompson
  - UFC.com Awards
    - 2012: Ranked #3 Knockout of the Year vs. Joe Lauzon
    - 2013: Submission of the Year vs. Benson Henderson & Ranked #6 Fighter of the Year
    - 2014: Ranked #2 Submission of the Year vs. Gilbert Melendez
    - 2017: Ranked #4 Fight of the Year vs. Dustin Poirier
    - 2018: Ranked #5 Fight of the Year vs. Tony Ferguson
    - 2019: Ranked #7 Knockout of the Year vs. Stephen Thompson & Ranked #9 Upset of the Year vs. Stephen Thompson
- World Extreme Cagefighting
  - WEC Lightweight Championship (One time; last)
  - Knockout of the Night (One time) vs. Danny Castillo
  - Submission of the Night (One time) vs. Shane Roller
  - Fight of the Night (One time) vs. Benson Henderson
- Gladiators Fighting Series
  - GFS Lightweight Championship (One time)
    - One successful title defense
- FIGHT! Magazine
  - 2010 Newcomer of the Year
- Inside MMA
  - 2013 Male Fighter of the Year Bazzie Award
- MMA Fighting
  - 2010 Fight of the Year vs. Benson Henderson on December 16
- ESPN
  - 2018 Fight of the Year vs. Tony Ferguson at UFC 229
- Sherdog
  - 2010 Breakthrough Fighter of the Year
- Bleacher Report
  - 2010 Breakout Fighter of the Year
  - 2013 #5 Ranked Fighter of the Year
- USA Today
  - 2010 Fight of the Year vs. Benson Henderson on December 16
- MMA Junkie
  - 2013 Submission of the Year vs. Benson Henderson at UFC 164
  - 2019 March Knockout of the Month vs. Stephen Thompson
- World MMA Awards
  - 2018 Fight of the Year vs. Tony Ferguson at UFC 229
- CBS Sports
  - 2018 #2 Ranked UFC Fight of the Year vs. Tony Ferguson
- Cagewriters
  - 2010 Breakthrough Fighter of the Year
- Arizona Sports
  - 2013 Submission of the Year vs. Benson Henderson at UFC 164

== Mixed martial arts record ==
Professional record breakdown
39 matches	25 wins	14 losses
By knockout	11	2
By submission	8	3
By decision	6	9

Res.	Record	Opponent	Method	Event	Date	Round	Time	Location	Notes
Loss	25–14	Stevie Ray	Decision (unanimous)	PFL 7 (2022)	August 5, 2022	3	5:00	New York City, New York, United States	2022 PFL Lightweight Tournament Semifinal.
Loss	25–13	Stevie Ray	Submission (twister)	PFL 5 (2022)	June 24, 2022	2	3:57	Atlanta, Georgia, United States	
Win	25–12	Myles Price	Submission (triangle choke)	PFL 3 (2022)	May 6, 2022	1	4:17	Arlington, Texas, United States	
Loss	24–12	Raush Manfio	Decision (split)	PFL 6 (2021)	June 25, 2021	3	5:00	Atlantic City, New Jersey, United States	
Loss	24–11	Clay Collard	Decision (unanimous)	PFL 1 (2021)	April 23, 2021	3	5:00	Atlantic City, New Jersey, United States	Return to Lightweight.
Win	24–10	Alex Morono	Decision (unanimous)	UFC Fight Night: Thompson vs. Neal	December 19, 2020	3	5:00	Las Vegas, Nevada, United States	
Win	23–10	Donald Cerrone	Decision (unanimous)	UFC 249	May 9, 2020	3	5:00	Jacksonville, Florida, United States	
Loss	22–10	Carlos Diego Ferreira	Submission (rear-naked choke)	UFC 246	January 18, 2020	2	1:46	Las Vegas, Nevada, United States	Lightweight bout.
Loss	22–9	Nate Diaz	Decision (unanimous)	UFC 241	August 17, 2019	3	5:00	Los Angeles, California, United States	
Win	22–8	Stephen Thompson	KO (punches)	UFC Fight Night: Thompson vs. Pettis	March 23, 2019	2	4:55	Nashville, Tennessee, United States	Return to Welterweight. Performance of the Night.
Loss	21–8	Tony Ferguson	TKO (corner stoppage)	UFC 229	October 6, 2018	2	5:00	Las Vegas, Nevada, United States	Fight of the Night.
Win	21–7	Michael Chiesa	Submission (triangle armbar)	UFC 226	July 7, 2018	2	0:52	Las Vegas, Nevada, United States	Catchweight (157.5 lb) bout; Chiesa missed weight. Performance of the Night.
Loss	20–7	Dustin Poirier	Submission (body triangle)	UFC Fight Night: Poirier vs. Pettis	November 11, 2017	3	2:08	Norfolk, Virginia, United States	Fight of the Night.
Win	20–6	Jim Miller	Decision (unanimous)	UFC 213	July 8, 2017	3	5:00	Las Vegas, Nevada, United States	Return to Lightweight.
Loss	19–6	Max Holloway	TKO (body kick and punches)	UFC 206	December 10, 2016	3	4:50	Toronto, Ontario, Canada	For the interim UFC Featherweight Championship; Pettis missed weight (148 lb) and was ineligible to win the title.
Win	19–5	Charles Oliveira	Submission (guillotine choke)	UFC on Fox: Maia vs. Condit	August 27, 2016	3	1:49	Vancouver, British Columbia, Canada	Featherweight debut.
Loss	18–5	Edson Barboza	Decision (unanimous)	UFC 197	April 23, 2016	3	5:00	Las Vegas, Nevada, United States	
Loss	18–4	Eddie Alvarez	Decision (split)	UFC Fight Night: Dillashaw vs. Cruz	January 17, 2016	3	5:00	Boston, Massachusetts, United States	
Loss	18–3	Rafael dos Anjos	Decision (unanimous)	UFC 185	March 14, 2015	5	5:00	Dallas, Texas, United States	Lost the UFC Lightweight Championship.
Win	18–2	Gilbert Melendez	Submission (guillotine choke)	UFC 181	December 6, 2014	2	1:53	Las Vegas, Nevada, United States	Defended the UFC Lightweight Championship. Performance of the Night.
Win	17–2	Benson Henderson	Submission (armbar)	UFC 164	August 31, 2013	1	4:31	Milwaukee, Wisconsin, United States	Won the UFC Lightweight Championship. Submission of the Night.
Win	16–2	Donald Cerrone	KO (kick to the body)	UFC on Fox: Johnson vs. Dodson	January 26, 2013	1	2:35	Chicago, Illinois, United States	Knockout of the Night.
Win	15–2	Joe Lauzon	KO (head kick and punches)	UFC 144	February 26, 2012	1	1:21	Saitama, Japan	Knockout of the Night.
Win	14–2	Jeremy Stephens	Decision (split)	UFC 136	October 8, 2011	3	5:00	Houston, Texas, United States	
Loss	13–2	Clay Guida	Decision (unanimous)	The Ultimate Fighter: Team Lesnar vs. Team dos Santos Finale	June 4, 2011	3	5:00	Las Vegas, Nevada, United States	
Win	13–1	Benson Henderson	Decision (unanimous)	WEC 53	December 16, 2010	5	5:00	Glendale, Arizona, United States	Won the WEC Lightweight Championship. Fight of the Night.
Win	12–1	Shane Roller	Submission (triangle choke)	WEC 50	August 18, 2010	3	4:51	Las Vegas, Nevada, United States	Submission of the Night.
Win	11–1	Alex Karalexis	Submission (triangle choke)	WEC 48	April 24, 2010	2	1:35	Sacramento, California, United States	
Win	10–1	Danny Castillo	KO (head kick and punches)	WEC 47	March 6, 2010	1	2:27	Columbus, Ohio, United States	Knockout of the Night.
Loss	9–1	Bart Palaszewski	Decision (split)	WEC 45	December 19, 2009	3	5:00	Las Vegas, Nevada, United States	
Win	9–0	Mike Campbell	Submission (triangle choke)	WEC 41	June 7, 2009	1	1:49	Sacramento, California, United States	Return to Lightweight.
Win	8–0	Gabe Walbridge	TKO (punches)	GFS: Season's Beatings	December 13, 2008	1	0:56	Milwaukee, Wisconsin, United States	Welterweight debut.
Win	7–0	Jay Ellis	TKO (submission to punches)	GFS 55	October 4, 2008	1	1:12	Milwaukee, Wisconsin, United States	Defended the GFS Lightweight Championship.
Win	6–0	Sherron Leggett	Decision (split)	GFS: Fight Club	June 21, 2008	3	5:00	Milwaukee, Wisconsin, United States	Won the GFS Lightweight Championship.
Win	5–0	Mike Lambrecht	KO (kick)	GFS: Knockout Kings	March 29, 2008	1	1:49	Milwaukee, Wisconsin, United States	
Win	4–0	George Barrazza	TKO (punches)	GFS: The Warriors	February 16, 2008	1	2:31	Milwaukee, Wisconsin, United States	
Win	3–0	Michael Skinner	TKO (submission to punches)	GFS: Seasons Beatings	December 1, 2007	1	0:36	Milwaukee, Wisconsin, United States	
Win	2–0	Lonny Amdahl	TKO (injury)	GFS: Rumble in the Cage	August 17, 2007	1	0:12	Green Bay, Wisconsin, United States	
Win	1–0	Tom Erspamer	TKO (punches)	GFS: Super Brawl	January 27, 2007	1	0:24	Wisconsin, United States	

== Professional boxing record ==
2 fights	1 win	1 loss
By decision	1	1

No.	Result	Record	Opponent	Type	Round, time	Date	Location	Notes
2	Loss	1–1	Chris Avila	UD	6	July 6, 2024	Honda Center, Anaheim, California, U.S.	
1	Win	1–0	Roy Jones Jr.	MD	8	Apr 1, 2023	Fiserv Forum, Milwaukee, Wisconsin, U.S.	

== Karate Combat record ==
Professional record breakdown
1 match	1 win	0 losses
By decision	1	0

Res.	Record	Opponent	Method	Event	Date	Round	Time	Location	Notes
Win	1–0	Benson Henderson	Decision (unanimous)	Karate Combat 43	December 15, 2023	3	3:00		

== Pay-per-view bouts ==
No.	Event	Fight	Date	Venue	City	PPV Buys
1.	UFC 164	Henderson vs. Pettis 2	August 31, 2013	BMO Harris Bradley Center	Milwaukee, Wisconsin, United States	270,000
2.	UFC 185	Pettis vs. dos Anjos	March 14, 2015	American Airlines Center	Dallas, Texas, United States	310,000
3.	UFC 206	Holloway vs. Pettis	December 10, 2016	Air Canada Centre	Toronto, Ontario, Canada	150,000

== See also ==
- List of male boxers
- List of male mixed martial artists
- List of mixed martial artists with professional boxing records
- List of multi-sport athletes

Awards and achievements
Preceded by Benson Henderson	7th WEC Lightweight Champion; December 16, 2010	Vacant WEC Lightweight division was dissolved into the UFC
Preceded by Benson Henderson	6th UFC Lightweight Champion; August 31, 2013 – March 14, 2015	Succeeded by Rafael dos Anjos
