= Tony Ferguson =

American mixed martial artist and boxer (born 1984)

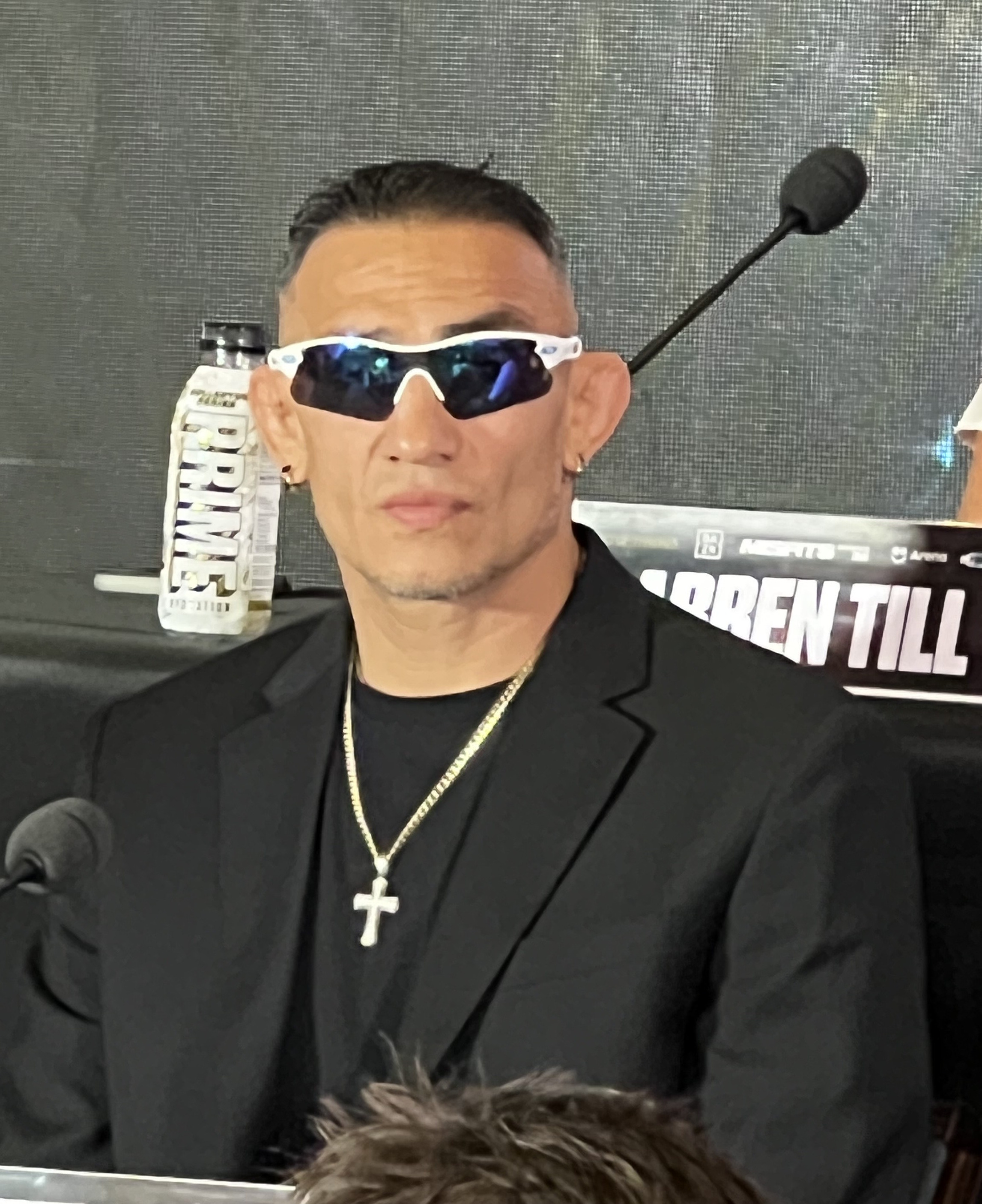
- Ferguson in 2025
- Born: Anthony Armand Padilla; February 12, 1984 (age 42); Oxnard, California, U.S.
- Nickname: El Cucuy
- Height: 6 ft 0 in (183 cm)
- Weight: 170 lb (77 kg; 12 st 2 lb)
- Division: Lightweight (2011–2021, 2023); Welterweight (2008–2011, 2022, 2024)
- Reach: 76 1/2 in (194 cm)
- Fighting out of: Orange County, California, U.S. Oxnard, California, U.S.
- Trainer: Boxing: Rashad Holloway, Joseph Janik (Former); Muay Thai: Billy Fonua; Jiu-Jitsu: Eddie Bravo, Ricardo "Franjinha" Miller (Former)
- Rank: Black belt in 10th Planet Jiu-Jitsu under Eddie Bravo
- Wrestling: NCWA Wrestling
- Years active: 2008–present

Professional boxing record
- Total: 3
- Wins: 3
- By knockout: 2

Mixed martial arts record
- Total: 36
- Wins: 25
- By knockout: 12
- By submission: 8
- By decision: 5
- Losses: 11
- By knockout: 2
- By submission: 4
- By decision: 5

Other information
- University: Central Michigan University Grand Valley State College
- Boxing record from BoxRec
- Mixed martial arts record from Sherdog
Medal record
Men's collegiate wrestling
Representing the Grand Valley State Lakers
NCWA Championships
Gold medal – first place	2006 Grand Rapids	165 lb

Anthony Armand Ferguson Padilla (born February 12, 1984) is an American professional mixed martial artist and professional boxer and is the current MFB Middleweight Champion. As a mixed martial artist, he is a former Interim UFC Lightweight Champion. A professional since 2008, he was signed to the UFC from his The Ultimate Fighter 13 win in 2011 until his departure in 2024, and he is tied for the record of having the longest losing streak in the company's history with Tai Tuivasa. He is regarded as one of the greatest fighters never to have won an undisputed belt.

== Early life and education ==
Ferguson was born in Oxnard, California, on February 12, 1984, but grew up mainly in Muskegon, Michigan. He is of Mexican heritage. His surname of Ferguson comes from his Scottish American stepfather.

Ferguson was a three-sport athlete at Muskegon Catholic Central High School in American football, baseball, and wrestling. He was a starting defensive back for the 2000 Division 8 state football champions and was a three-time All-State selection in wrestling, winning the 152-lb division in 2002.

After high school, Ferguson enrolled at Central Michigan University before transferring to Grand Valley State University. He also did a stint at Muskegon Community College. He did not complete his degree, but had a successful collegiate wrestling career, winning the 2006 National Collegiate Wrestling Association national wrestling championship in the 165-lb division.

Following college, Ferguson moved back to California to be closer to his extended family, working in marketing and sales during the day and picking up shifts as a bartender at night. One night, while working a bar shift, a patron noticed Ferguson's cauliflower ear and struck up a conversation about his wrestling background. The patron was a trainer at a local MMA gym and invited him to work with some young mixed martial artists on their wrestling. Shortly after this, he decided to pursue a professional mixed martial arts (MMA) career.

== Mixed martial arts career ==
=== Early career ===
Ferguson began his professional MMA career fighting in small organizations around California in 2007. Notable matches in his early career include a win over kickboxing champion Joe Schilling and a loss to future World Extreme Cagefighting (WEC) fighter Karen Darabedyan.

=== The Ultimate Fighter ===
Ferguson applied to compete in the UFC's reality series The Ultimate Fighter multiple times. In 2010, he was finally accepted to compete in season 13 of the series after amassing a 10–2 professional record and winning the welterweight championship in PureCombat. He competed as a welterweight on The Ultimate Fighter: Team Lesnar vs. Team dos Santos.

Ferguson was selected as the third pick for Team Lesnar. In his first fight, Ferguson defeated Justin Edwards by knockout in the first round. He next faced Ryan McGillivray in the quarterfinals and won by a TKO in the first round. He then faced Chuck O'Neil in the semifinals and won by TKO in the third round to advance to the final.

=== Ultimate Fighting Championship ===
Ferguson officially made his UFC debut at the Ultimate Fighter 13 Finale against Ramsey Nijem to determine the winner of The Ultimate Fighter 13. Ferguson defeated Nijem by knockout in the first round to win a UFC contract. He also received a $40,000 Knockout of the Night bonus.

Following his debut, Ferguson returned to lightweight and faced Aaron Riley on September 24, 2011, at UFC 135. The fight was stopped after the first round after Riley said he had a broken jaw, resulting in a TKO victory for Ferguson.

Ferguson then faced MMA veteran Yves Edwards at the Ultimate Fighter 14 Finale. Ferguson won via unanimous decision (30–27, 30–27, and 29–28).

Ferguson was expected to face Dennis Hallman on May 5, 2012, at UFC on Fox: Diaz vs. Miller. Hallman pulled out of the bout with an injury and replaced by Thiago Tavares. Then, Tavares was forced out of the bout with an injury and replaced by Michael Johnson. Ferguson lost the fight by unanimous decision.

==== Win streak ====
After over a year away from competition while healing an arm injury incurred in his last fight, Ferguson returned to face Mike Rio on October 19, 2013, at UFC 166 which was the beginning of his twelve fight win streak. He won by D'Arce choke submission in the first round. The win also earned him his first Submission of the Night award, valued at $60,000.

Ferguson faced Katsunori Kikuno on May 24, 2014, at UFC 173. He won the fight by knockout in the first round.

Ferguson was expected to face Danny Castillo on August 2, 2014, at UFC 176. After UFC 176 was cancelled, Castillo/Ferguson was rescheduled and took place on August 30, 2014, at UFC 177. Ferguson won the fight via split decision.

Ferguson faced Abel Trujillo on December 6, 2014, at UFC 181. Ferguson won the bout in the second round by submission.

Ferguson was expected to face Yancy Medeiros on February 28, 2015, at UFC 184. Medeiros pulled out of the bout, citing injury, and was replaced by Gleison Tibau. Ferguson won the fight by submission in the first round which also earned him a Performance of the Night bonus.

Ferguson faced Josh Thomson on July 15, 2015, at UFC Fight Night 71. He won the fight via unanimous decision (30–27, 30–27, and 30–26) and earned his second straight Performance of the Night bonus.

Ferguson was expected to face Khabib Nurmagomedov on December 11, 2015, at the Ultimate Fighter 22 Finale. Nurmagomedov pulled out of the fight in late October, citing injury, and was replaced by Edson Barboza. After a back-and-forth first round that had Ferguson docked one point due to an illegal upkick, Ferguson finished Barboza with a D'Arce choke submission in the second round. He earned his third consecutive Performance of the Night bonus as well as a Fight of the Night bonus.

A rematch with Michael Johnson was briefly scheduled for March 5, 2016, at UFC 196. On January 27, it was announced that Johnson withdrew from the bout due to injury. In turn, the bout with Nurmagomedov was rescheduled and expected take place on April 16, 2016, at UFC on Fox 19. On April 5, Ferguson pulled out of the bout due to a lung issue. He was replaced by promotional newcomer Darrell Horcher.

Ferguson was expected to face Michael Chiesa on July 13, 2016, at UFC Fight Night 91. Chiesa pulled out of the fight on June 27, citing injury, and was replaced by promotional newcomer Lando Vannata. Ferguson won his second straight fight via D'Arce choke and was awarded another Fight of the Night bonus.

Ferguson fought former champion Rafael dos Anjos on November 5, 2016, at the Ultimate Fighter Latin America 3 Finale. He won the fight by unanimous decision. Both participants were awarded Fight of the Night, which gave Ferguson his sixth post-fight bonus in his past five fights.

The pairing with Nurmagomedov was scheduled for a third time at UFC 209, this time for the interim UFC Lightweight Championship. Prior to the weigh-ins for the event, Nurmagomedov was hospitalized due to the ill effects of his weight cut, and the bout was cancelled yet again.

Ferguson faced Kevin Lee on October 7, 2017, at UFC 216 for the interim UFC Lightweight Championship. He won the bout by triangle choke submission in the third round. A bout with Nurmagomedov had been scheduled for the fourth time on April 7, 2018, at UFC 223. On April 1, 2018, Ferguson reportedly tore his fibular collateral ligament while walking on the set for a pre-fight media obligation and was forced to withdraw from the event.

Ferguson faced Anthony Pettis on October 6, 2018, at UFC 229. He won the bout via corner stoppage after two rounds. Pettis' longtime cornerman and coach, Duke Roufus, informed the referee that he would not continue after suffering a broken hand. Their performance earned both participants Fight of the Night honors.

Ferguson next faced Donald Cerrone on June 8, 2019, at UFC 238. He won the fight via TKO due to a doctor stoppage after Cerrone blew his nose between rounds 2 & 3 which caused his swollen right eye to completely close, rendering him unable to continue. This fight earned both participants Fight of the Night honors.

==== Losing streak ====
Ferguson was scheduled to face Khabib Nurmagomedov for the UFC Lightweight Championship on April 18, 2020, at UFC 249, however the fight was canceled after Nurmagomedov was unable to leave Russia due to restricted air travel as a result of the coronavirus pandemic. Ferguson then agreed to compete for the Interim UFC Lightweight Championship against a late replacement in Justin Gaethje at the event. On April 9, UFC president Dana White announced that this event was postponed and the bout eventually took place on May 9, 2020. He was outstruck by Gaethje for all five rounds, eventually losing the fight via TKO in the fifth round. This fight earned both participants Fight of the Night honors.

Ferguson faced Charles Oliveira on December 12, 2020, at UFC 256. He lost the fight via unanimous decision after being dominated and controlled on the ground for most of the fight.

Ferguson faced Beneil Dariush on May 15, 2021, at UFC 262. He lost the fight via unanimous decision being once again controlled on the ground for the majority of the fight.

Ferguson faced former Bellator Lightweight Champion Michael Chandler on May 7, 2022 at UFC 274. Despite a strong first round, Ferguson lost the fight via knockout early in the second round.

Ferguson was scheduled to return to the welterweight division to face Li Jingliang on September 10, 2022, in the co-main event of UFC 279. However, Ferguson instead moved up to the main event to face Nate Diaz, after his original opponent Khamzat Chimaev was pulled from their fight due to missing weight. Ferguson lost the fight via a guillotine choke submission in the fourth round.

Ferguson returned to the lightweight division to face King Green at UFC 291 on July 29, 2023. He lost the fight via technical submission due to an arm-triangle choke in the final seconds of the third round.

Ferguson faced Paddy Pimblett on December 16, 2023, at UFC 296. He lost the fight via unanimous decision.

Ferguson faced Michael Chiesa in a welterweight bout on August 3, 2024 at UFC on ABC 7. He lost the fight via a rear-naked choke submission in the first round. With this eighth consecutive loss, Ferguson surpassed B.J. Penn and now holds the record for the longest losing streak in UFC history.

=== Global Fight League ===
On January 24, 2025, it was announced that Ferguson had parted ways with the UFC and signed with the Global Fight League.

Ferguson was drafted by the GFL's Team Los Angeles the same day his signing was announced. He was scheduled to face Dillon Danis on May 25, 2025 at GFL 2. However, the first two GFL events were postponed indefinitely.

== Boxing career ==
In January 2025, Ferguson was among names for a potential boxing bout against English influencer KSI after his bout with English footballer Wayne Bridge fell through. Ferguson revealed he turned down the offer to face Dillon Danis on the then announced GFL event in May.

=== Ferguson vs. Papi ===
On July 5, 2025, Ferguson stated that he had a bout in boxing scheduled for August 30. Two weeks later, it was announced that Ferguson would face Filipino influencer Salt Papi for the MFB interim middleweight title, headlining Misfits 22 – Ring of Thrones alongside Darren Till vs Luke Rockhold at the Manchester Arena in Manchester, England. Ferguson won the championship by technical knockout in the third round.

=== Ferguson vs. Spencer ===
On November 4, Misfits Boxing co-president Mams Taylor announced that Ferguson would be returning to the ring in December to unify his interim title on the Misfits Mania – The Fight Before Christmas undercard. On November 19, the bout was announced for December 20 at the Dubai Duty Free Tennis Stadium in Dubai, UAE against Isle of Man influencer Warren Spencer. On November 22, Taylor confirmed during an X Space that the MFB middleweight champion, Saudi influencer AnEsonGib, had relinquish his title therefore making his bout with Spencer now set for the vacant MFB middleweight championship. Ferguson defeated Spencer via unanimous decision (49–45, 49–45, 48–46).

=== Ferguson vs. Sebie ===
On 31 August 2026, BoxRec accidentally leaked that Ferguson is set to return against a currently unannounced opponent on the Deen the Great vs. Henry Cejudo undercard. On September 5, Misfits Boxing formally announced that Ferguson would make his first title defense against former soccer player Kenzo Biyong on September 28 at the James L. Knight Center in Miami, Florida. On September 22 however, Biyong was replaced with Mahmoud Sebie due to travel restrictions. On the night, Ferguson defeated Sebi via second round technical successfully defending his title. After the bout, Ferguson faced off with YouTuber Austin McBroom.

== Freestyle wrestling career ==
Ferguson signed with Real American Freestyle (RAF) on April 30, 2026.

He lost to Arman Tsarukyan by technical fall in the co-main event of RAF 10 on June 13, 2026.

== Personal life ==
Ferguson has two sons with his wife, Cristina Ferguson. In March 2019, Cristina filed a temporary restraining order against Tony in Orange County, California, alleging uncharacteristic behavior including severe paranoia, prolonged sleep deprivation, destruction of their home fireplace, and beliefs that a tracking chip had been inserted into his leg during reconstructive knee surgery. According to court filings reported by multiple media outlets, she also stated that Ferguson had taken their son from the family home for several days without her consent, and that police had been called to their residence on multiple occasions over the preceding months.

She did not allege physical abuse, and later stated that the filing was intended as a precautionary measure to encourage him to seek help for his mental state. By April 2019, she had withdrawn the request, and the restraining order expired without any criminal charges being filed. He then began to resume MMA.

In the early hours of May 7, 2023, Ferguson was arrested in Hollywood, California and charged with driving under the influence after allegedly crashing his pickup truck into two other vehicles outside of a nightclub, causing his truck to roll over in the process. He was taken into custody and booked into the LAPD Hollywood police station where his bail was set at $30,000. He was later released from custody on a personal recognizance bond.

== Fighting style ==
Ferguson is known for his well-rounded style which includes unorthodox striking, exceptional cardio, sharp elbows, and proficiency in D'Arce chokes. During his peak, he achieved a 12-fight winning streak, finishing nine of his opponents. His aggressive fighting style, particularly his use of elbows, often left opponents bloodied and contributed to six "Fight of the Night" bonuses.

== Public appearance and cultural influences ==
Ferguson is known as one of MMA's most eccentric personalities. He constructed his own custom training apparatus at his house in Big Bear Lake, California and regularly posts videos of his unique workouts on his personal Instagram page. These include smacking his arms and legs against metal poles to build bone strength, throwing baseballs off a pitcher's mound to build power, and somersault jumps over tall stacks of gym mats.

== Championships and accomplishments ==
=== Amateur wrestling ===
- National Collegiate Wrestling Association
  - NCWA National Champion (2006)
  - NCWA All-American (2006, 2007)
  - North Central Conference Champion (2006, 2007)
- Michigan High School Athletic Association
  - MHSAA Division IV State Champion (2002)
  - MHSAA Division IV All-State (2000-2002)

=== Mixed martial arts ===
- Ultimate Fighting Championship
  - Interim UFC Lightweight Championship (One time)
  - The Ultimate Fighter 13 winner
  - Fight of the Night (Six times) vs. Edson Barboza, Lando Vannata, Rafael dos Anjos, Anthony Pettis, Donald Cerrone and Justin Gaethje
  - Knockout of the Night (One time) vs. Ramsey Nijem
  - Submission of the Night (One time) vs. Mike Rio
  - Performance of the Night (Three times) vs. Edson Barboza, Josh Thomson and Gleison Tibau
  - Tied (Khabib Nurmagomedov) for the second longest win streak in UFC Lightweight division history (12)
  - Tied (Donald Cerrone, Dustin Poirier & Islam Makhachev) for fifth most finishes in UFC Lightweight division history (10)
  - Second most D'Arce choke submission wins in UFC history (3) (behind Vicente Luque)
  - Seventh most significant strikes landed in UFC Lightweight division history (1221)
  - Seventh most total strikes landed in UFC Lightweight division history (1404)
  - Tied (Tai Tuivasa) for the longest losing streak in UFC history (8)
    - Tied (B.J. Penn, Jeremy Stephens & Tai Tuivasa) for the second longest winless streak in UFC history (8) (behind Sam Alvey)
  - UFC.com Awards
    - 2011: Ranked #3 Newcomer of the Year
    - 2015: Ranked #9 Fighter of the Year, Ranked #5 Submission of the Year vs. Edson Barboza & Ranked #3 Fight of the Year vs. Edson Barboza
    - 2016: Ranked #9 Fight of the Year vs. Rafael dos Anjos
    - 2018: Ranked #5 Fight of the Year vs. Anthony Pettis
    - 2019: Ranked #9 Fight of the Year vs. Donald Cerrone
    - 2020: Ranked #6 Fight of the Year vs. Justin Gaethje
- PureCombat
  - PureCombat Welterweight Championship (One time)
- MMA Fighting
  - 2010s #10 Ranked Fighter of the Decade
- ESPN
  - 2018 Fight of the Year vs. Anthony Pettis at UFC 229
- World MMA Awards
  - 2018 Fight of the Year vs. Anthony Pettis at UFC 229
- CBS Sports
  - 2018 #2 Ranked UFC Fight of the Year vs. Anthony Pettis
- MMA Junkie
  - 2015 #5 Ranked Fight of the Year vs. Edson Barboza at The Ultimate Fighter: Team McGregor vs. Team Faber Finale

=== Boxing ===
- Interim Misfits Boxing Middleweight Championship (One time)
- MFB Middleweight Championship (One Time)
- • One title defence
- Prime Fighter of the Night (One time) vs. Salt Papi
- Misfits Boxing Awards
  - 2025: Best Redemption (nominated), Fight of the Year (nominated)

== Mixed martial arts record ==
Professional record breakdown
36 matches	25 wins	11 losses
By knockout	12	2
By submission	8	4
By decision	5	5

Res.	Record	Opponent	Method	Event	Date	Round	Time	Location	Notes
Loss	25–11	Michael Chiesa	Submission (rear-naked choke)	UFC on ABC: Sandhagen vs. Nurmagomedov	August 3, 2024	1	3:44	Abu Dhabi, United Arab Emirates	Welterweight bout.
Loss	25–10	Paddy Pimblett	Decision (unanimous)	UFC 296	December 16, 2023	3	5:00	Las Vegas, Nevada, United States	
Loss	25–9	King Green	Technical Submission (arm-triangle choke)	UFC 291	July 29, 2023	3	4:54	Salt Lake City, Utah, United States	
Loss	25–8	Nate Diaz	Submission (guillotine choke)	UFC 279	September 10, 2022	4	2:52	Las Vegas, Nevada, United States	Welterweight bout.
Loss	25–7	Michael Chandler	KO (front kick)	UFC 274	May 7, 2022	2	0:17	Phoenix, Arizona, United States	
Loss	25–6	Beneil Dariush	Decision (unanimous)	UFC 262	May 15, 2021	3	5:00	Houston, Texas, United States	
Loss	25–5	Charles Oliveira	Decision (unanimous)	UFC 256	December 12, 2020	3	5:00	Las Vegas, Nevada, United States	
Loss	25–4	Justin Gaethje	TKO (punch)	UFC 249	May 9, 2020	5	3:39	Jacksonville, Florida, United States	For the interim UFC Lightweight Championship. Fight of the Night.
Win	25–3	Donald Cerrone	TKO (doctor stoppage)	UFC 238	June 8, 2019	2	5:00	Chicago, Illinois, United States	Fight of the Night.
Win	24–3	Anthony Pettis	TKO (corner stoppage)	UFC 229	October 6, 2018	2	5:00	Las Vegas, Nevada, United States	Fight of the Night.
Win	23–3	Kevin Lee	Submission (triangle choke)	UFC 216	October 7, 2017	3	4:02	Las Vegas, Nevada, United States	Won the interim UFC Lightweight Championship. Ferguson was stripped of the title on April 7, 2018 due to injury.
Win	22–3	Rafael dos Anjos	Decision (unanimous)	The Ultimate Fighter Latin America 3 Finale: dos Anjos vs. Ferguson	November 5, 2016	5	5:00	Mexico City, Mexico	Fight of the Night.
Win	21–3	Lando Vannata	Submission (brabo choke)	UFC Fight Night: McDonald vs. Lineker	July 13, 2016	2	2:22	Sioux Falls, South Dakota, United States	Fight of the Night.
Win	20–3	Edson Barboza	Submission (brabo choke)	The Ultimate Fighter: Team McGregor vs. Team Faber Finale	December 11, 2015	2	2:54	Las Vegas, Nevada, United States	Ferguson was deducted one point in round one due to an illegal upkick. Performance of the Night. Fight of the Night.
Win	19–3	Josh Thomson	Decision (unanimous)	UFC Fight Night: Mir vs. Duffee	July 15, 2015	3	5:00	San Diego, California, United States	Performance of the Night.
Win	18–3	Gleison Tibau	Submission (rear-naked choke)	UFC 184	February 28, 2015	1	2:37	Los Angeles, California, United States	Performance of the Night.
Win	17–3	Abel Trujillo	Submission (rear-naked choke)	UFC 181	December 6, 2014	2	4:19	Las Vegas, Nevada, United States	
Win	16–3	Danny Castillo	Decision (split)	UFC 177	August 30, 2014	3	5:00	Sacramento, California, United States	
Win	15–3	Katsunori Kikuno	KO (punch)	UFC 173	May 24, 2014	1	4:06	Las Vegas, Nevada, United States	
Win	14–3	Mike Rio	Submission (brabo choke)	UFC 166	October 19, 2013	1	1:52	Houston, Texas, United States	Submission of the Night.
Loss	13–3	Michael Johnson	Decision (unanimous)	UFC on Fox: Diaz vs. Miller	May 5, 2012	3	5:00	East Rutherford, New Jersey, United States	
Win	13–2	Yves Edwards	Decision (unanimous)	The Ultimate Fighter: Team Bisping vs. Team Miller Finale	December 3, 2011	3	5:00	Las Vegas, Nevada, United States	
Win	12–2	Aaron Riley	TKO (jaw injury)	UFC 135	September 24, 2011	1	5:00	Denver, Colorado, United States	Return to Lightweight.
Win	11–2	Ramsey Nijem	KO (punches)	The Ultimate Fighter: Team Lesnar vs. Team dos Santos Finale	June 4, 2011	1	3:54	Las Vegas, Nevada, United States	Won The Ultimate Fighter 13 Welterweight Tournament. Knockout of the Night.
Win	10–2	Brock Jardine	TKO (punches)	PureCombat 12: Champions for Children	September 25, 2010	4	2:35	Clovis, California, United States	Won the vacant PureCombat Welterweight Championship.
Win	9–2	David Gardner	TKO (punches)	CA Fight Syndicate: Battle of the 805	March 26, 2010	2	0:27	Ventura, California, United States	Catchweight (158 lb) bout.
Win	8–2	Chris Kennedy	TKO (doctor stoppage)	National Fight Alliance MMA: Resurrection	December 18, 2009	1	2:29	Ventura, California, United States	
Loss	7–2	Jamie Toney	Submission (triangle choke)	National Fight Alliance MMA: MMA at the Hyatt 3	October 16, 2009	1	2:15	Westlake Village, California, United States	
Win	7–1	James Fanshier	Decision (unanimous)	Rebel Fighter	July 17, 2009	3	5:00	Placerville, California, United States	
Win	6–1	Devin Benjamin	TKO (punches and elbows)	National Fight Alliance MMA: MMA at the Hyatt II	May 28, 2009	1	0:51	Westlake Village, California, United States	
Win	5–1	Daniel Hernandez	TKO (punches)	National Fight Alliance MMA: Riot at the Hyatt	March 5, 2009	1	2:22	Westlake Village, California, United States	Return to Welterweight.
Loss	4–1	Karen Darabedyan	Decision (unanimous)	All Star Boxing: Caged in the Cannon	February 6, 2009	3	3:00	Montebello, California, United States	Lightweight debut.
Win	4–0	Frank Park	Submission (neck crank)	Long Beach Fight Night 3	January 4, 2009	1	2:43	Long Beach, California, United States	
Win	3–0	Joe Schilling	Submission (rear-naked choke)	Total Fighting Alliance 12	September 13, 2008	2	2:12	Long Beach, California, United States	
Win	2–0	Brandon Adams	TKO (punches)	Total Fighting Alliance 11: Pounding at the Pyramid	July 12, 2008	2	2:18	Long Beach, California, United States	
Win	1–0	Steve Avalos	TKO (submission to punches)	California Xtreme Fighting: Anarchy at the Arena	April 12, 2008	2	1:25	Upland, California, United States	

== Mixed martial arts exhibition record ==
Exhibition record breakdown		
3 matches	3 wins	0 losses
By knockout	3	0

Res.	Record	Opponent	Method	Event	Date	Round	Time	Location	Notes
Win	3–0	Chuck O'Neil	TKO (punches)	The Ultimate Fighter: Team Lesnar vs. Team dos Santos	June 1, 2011 (airdate)	3	3:10	Las Vegas, Nevada, United States	The Ultimate Fighter 13 Semi-Final round.
Win	2–0	Ryan McGillivray	TKO (punches)	The Ultimate Fighter: Team Lesnar vs. Team dos Santos	May 25, 2011 (airdate)	1	0:46	Las Vegas, Nevada, United States	The Ultimate Fighter 13 Quarter-Final round.
Win	1–0	Justin Edwards	KO (upkick)	The Ultimate Fighter: Team Lesnar vs. Team dos Santos	May 4, 2011 (airdate)	1	3:56	Las Vegas, Nevada, United States	The Ultimate Fighter 13 Preliminary round.

== Freestyle wrestling record ==
Freestyle matches
Res.	Record	Opponent	Score	Date	Event	Location
Loss	0–1	(Armenia) Arman Tsarukyan	TF 0-10	June 13, 2026	RAF 10: Chimaev vs. Danis	(United States) St. Louis, Missouri

== Boxing record ==
=== Professional ===
2 fights	2 wins	0 losses
By knockout	2	0

No.	Result	Record	Opponent	Type	Round, time	Date	Age	Location	Notes
2	Win	2–0	Mahmoud Sebie	TKO	2 (6), 0:42	Sep 26, 2026	42 years, 226 days	James L. Knight Center, Miami, Florida, U.S.	Retained MFB middleweight title
1	Win	1–0	Salt Papi	TKO	3 (5), 2:43	Aug 30, 2025	41 years, 199 days	Manchester Arena, Manchester, England	Won MFB interim middleweight title

=== MF–Professional ===
1 fight	1 win	0 losses
By decision	1	0

No.	Result	Record	Opponent	Type	Round, time	Date	Age	Location	Notes
1	Win	1–0	Warren Spencer	UD	6	Dec 20, 2025	41 years, 311 days	Dubai Duty Free Tennis Stadium, Dubai, UAE	Won vacant MFB middleweight title

== Pay-per-view bouts ==
=== MMA ===
No.	Event	Fight	Date	Venue	City	PPV Buys
1	UFC 216	Ferguson vs. Lee	October 7, 2017	T-Mobile Arena	Las Vegas, Nevada, U.S	200,000
2	UFC 249	Ferguson vs. Gaethje	May 9, 2020	VyStar Veterans Memorial Arena	Jacksonville, Florida, U.S.	700,000
3	UFC 279	Diaz vs. Ferguson	September 10, 2022	T-Mobile Arena	Las Vegas, Nevada, U.S	Undisclosed

=== Boxing ===
No.	Date	Fight	Billing	Network	Location	Buys	Revenue	Source(s)
1	30 August 2025	Ferguson vs Papi	Ring of Thrones	DAZN	AO Arena	Undisclosed	—N/a	—N/a
Total

== See also ==
- List of male mixed martial artists
- List of mixed martial artists with professional boxing records
- List of UFC fighters

Achievements
New title	1st UFC Interim Lightweight Champion; October 7, 2017 - April 7, 2018; Stripped	Vacant Title next held by Dustin Poirier
