= Danny Castillo =

American mixed martial arts fighter

- Born: Daniel Alfonso Castillo; August 25, 1979 (age 47); San Francisco, California, U.S.
- Other names: Last Call
- Height: 5 ft 9 in (1.75 m)
- Weight: 155 lb (70 kg; 11.1 st)
- Division: Lightweight
- Reach: 71 in (180 cm)
- Stance: Southpaw
- Fighting out of: Sacramento, California, U.S
- Team: Team Alpha Male
- Rank: Black belt in Brazilian Jiu-Jitsu under Fábio "Pateta" Prado
- Wrestling: NAIA wrestling
- Years active: 2007–2015

Mixed martial arts record
- Total: 27
- Wins: 17
- By knockout: 6
- By submission: 4
- By decision: 7
- Losses: 10
- By knockout: 3
- By submission: 2
- By decision: 5

Other information
- Mixed martial arts record from Sherdog

Daniel Castillo (born August 25, 1979) is an American retired mixed martial artist. A professional from 2007 until 2015, he competed in 22 bouts with both the Ultimate Fighting Championship (UFC) and the World Extreme Cagefighting (WEC).

== Mixed martial arts career ==
=== Early career ===
Castillo began training MMA when he joined the wrestling team at his high school in suburban Sacramento. His vice principal, who was also the wrestling coach, told Castillo that if he joined the team, he would not call his mother after seeing Castillo constantly in trouble. Castillo claims he was scared his first day at practice, "I got the [expletive] kicked out of me that day, but after that, I wasn't nervous at wrestling practice ever." After leaving private school, Castillo graduated from Laguna Creek High School (Elk Grove, CA) and attended Menlo College; becoming an NAIA All American in 2004. His nickname "Last Call" was given to him in college due to his ability to perform well in his team's offseason morning runs despite having been up consuming massive amounts of alcohol until last call.

Castillo made his professional debut in November 2007, fighting twice in the month, winning both fights via first round submission. After going 3-0, Castillo signed to fight on the Palace Fighting Championship's seventh card. He fought Andy Salazar winning via submission due to his tough ground and pound. He won his fifth straight fight after defeating Strikeforce veteran, Isaiah Hill. With the win, Castillo was signed with the WEC.

=== World Extreme Cagefighting ===
Castillo made his debut against Donald Cerrone at WEC 34, replacing an injured Rich Crunkilton. Cerrone defeated Castillo via first round armbar submission.

Castillo then fought Rafael Dias at WEC 36, winning via TKO in the second round.

Four months later Castillo fought Phil Cardella at WEC 39. Castillo won the fight via split decision.

Castillo then defeated Ricardo Lamas, winning his third straight WEC fight.

Castillo was defeated by Shane Roller via third round submission at WEC 44.

Castillo looked to rebound from his loss to Roller when he fought Anthony Pettis at WEC 47, but lost via KO after getting caught flush with a head kick.

Castillo defeated WEC newcomer Dustin Poirier via unanimous decision on August 18, 2010, at WEC 50.

Castillo next faced Will Kerr on December 16, 2010, at WEC 53. He won the fight via KO in the first round.

=== Ultimate Fighting Championship ===
In October 2010, World Extreme Cagefighting merged with the Ultimate Fighting Championship. As part of the merger, all WEC fighters were transferred to the UFC. On December 31, 2010, Castillo officially became a contracted UFC fighter, signing a four-fight deal with the promotion.

In his UFC debut, Castillo fought Joe Stevenson on March 3, 2011, at UFC Live: Sanchez vs. Kampmann. Castillo controlled the entirety of the fight and won via unanimous decision.

Castillo faced Jacob Volkmann on August 14, 2011, at UFC on Versus 5. He lost the fight via unanimous decision (29-28, 29-28, 29-28).

Castillo faced Shamar Bailey on November 19, 2011, at UFC 139. Bailey came in 3 pounds over, which resulted being fined 20 percent of his earnings, and the bout took place at a catchweight of 158 lb. Castillo won the fight via TKO in the first round.

Castillo faced Anthony Njokuani on December 30, 2011, at UFC 141 on five weeks notice, replacing an injured Ramsey Nijem. Throughout the fight Castillo scored several suplex takedowns and looked to smother his opponent on the ground. He won the fight via split decision.

Castillo faced John Cholish on May 5, 2012, at UFC on Fox 3. He defeated Cholish via unanimous decision (30-27, 30-27, 30-27).

Castillo was expected to face Michael Johnson on September 1, 2012, at UFC 151. However, after UFC 151 was cancelled, Castillo/Johnson was rescheduled and took place on October 5, 2012, at UFC on FX 5. After a dominant first round put in by Castillo, where he nearly finished Johnson via strikes and then with a submission attempt, he was knocked out cold with a counter left at 1:06 of the second round.

Castillo faced Paul Sass on February 16, 2013, at UFC on Fuel TV: Barão vs. McDonald. Castillo used a superior top game and ground and pound en route to a unanimous decision victory.

Castillo was expected to face Bobby Green on July 27, 2013, at UFC on Fox 8. However, in mid-July, Green pulled out of the bout citing an injury and was replaced by Tim Means. He won the fight via unanimous decision.

Castillo faced Edson Barboza on December 14, 2013, at UFC on Fox 9. After a dominant first round by Castillo, Barboza was able to rally over rounds two and three, and defeated Castillo via majority decision in a bout that earned both participants Fight of the Night honors.

Castillo was briefly linked to a bout with Isaac Vallie-Flagg on April 26, 2014, at UFC 172. However, the UFC removed Vallie-Flagg from the bout in favor of a match up with Takanori Gomi, while Castillo instead fought against Charlie Brenneman. Castillo won the fight via knockout in the second round.

Castillo was expected to face Tony Ferguson on August 2, 2014, at UFC 176. However, after UFC 176 was cancelled, Castillo/Ferguson was rescheduled and took place on August 30, 2014, at UFC 177. Castillo lost the back and forth fight via split decision.

Castillo was expected to face Rustam Khabilov on January 3, 2015, at UFC 182. However, Khabilov pulled out of the bout due to alleged visa issues and was replaced by Paul Felder. Castillo lost the bout via knockout due to a spinning backfist in the second round.

A rescheduled bout with Rustam Khabilov was expected to take place on July 25, 2015, at UFC on Fox 16. However, for a second time, Khabilov was removed from the pairing due to alleged visa issues. Castillo faced Jim Miller at the event. He lost the fight by split decision.

Castillo faced Nik Lentz on December 19, 2015, at UFC on Fox 17. He lost the fight by split decision.

On January 29, 2016, Castillo was released from the UFC. He has since retired from mixed martial arts.

== Championships and accomplishments ==
- Ultimate Fighting Championship
  - Fight of the Night (One time) vs. Edson Barboza
  - UFC.com Awards
    - 2011: Ranked #10 Import of the Year (Tied with Alistair Overeem)

== Mixed martial arts record ==
Professional record breakdown
27 matches	17 wins	10 losses
By knockout	6	3
By submission	4	2
By decision	7	5

Res.	Record	Opponent	Method	Event	Date	Round	Time	Location	Notes
Loss	17–10	Nik Lentz	Decision (split)	UFC on Fox: dos Anjos vs. Cowboy 2	December 19, 2015	3	5:00	Orlando, Florida, United States	
Loss	17–9	Jim Miller	Decision (split)	UFC on Fox: Dillashaw vs. Barão 2	July 25, 2015	3	5:00	Chicago, Illinois, United States	
Loss	17–8	Paul Felder	KO (spinning back fist)	UFC 182	January 3, 2015	2	2:09	Las Vegas, Nevada, United States	
Loss	17–7	Tony Ferguson	Decision (split)	UFC 177	August 30, 2014	3	5:00	Sacramento, California, United States	
Win	17–6	Charlie Brenneman	KO (punch)	UFC 172	April 26, 2014	2	0:21	Baltimore, Maryland, United States	
Loss	16–6	Edson Barboza	Decision (majority)	UFC on Fox: Johnson vs. Benavidez 2	December 14, 2013	3	5:00	Sacramento, California, United States	Fight of the Night.
Win	16–5	Tim Means	Decision (unanimous)	UFC on Fox: Johnson vs. Moraga	July 27, 2013	3	5:00	Seattle, Washington, United States	Catchweight (160 lbs) bout; Means missed weight.
Win	15–5	Paul Sass	Decision (unanimous)	UFC on Fuel TV: Barão vs. McDonald	February 16, 2013	3	5:00	London, England	
Loss	14–5	Michael Johnson	KO (punches)	UFC on FX: Browne vs. Bigfoot	October 5, 2012	2	1:06	Minneapolis, Minnesota, United States	
Win	14–4	John Cholish	Decision (unanimous)	UFC on Fox: Diaz vs. Miller	May 5, 2012	3	5:00	East Rutherford, New Jersey, United States	
Win	13–4	Anthony Njokuani	Decision (split)	UFC 141	December 30, 2011	3	5:00	Las Vegas, Nevada, United States	
Win	12–4	Shamar Bailey	TKO (punches)	UFC 139	November 19, 2011	1	4:52	San Jose, California, United States	Catchweight (158 lbs) bout; Bailey missed weight.
Loss	11–4	Jacob Volkmann	Decision (unanimous)	UFC Live: Hardy vs. Lytle	August 14, 2011	3	5:00	Milwaukee, Wisconsin, United States	
Win	11–3	Joe Stevenson	Decision (unanimous)	UFC Live: Sanchez vs. Kampmann	March 3, 2011	3	5:00	Louisville, Kentucky, United States	
Win	10–3	Will Kerr	KO (punches)	WEC 53	December 16, 2010	1	1:25	Glendale, Arizona, United States	
Win	9–3	Dustin Poirier	Decision (unanimous)	WEC 50	August 18, 2010	3	5:00	Las Vegas, Nevada, United States	
Loss	8–3	Anthony Pettis	KO (head kick and punches)	WEC 47	March 6, 2010	1	2:17	Columbus, Ohio, United States	
Loss	8–2	Shane Roller	Submission (rear-naked choke)	WEC 44	November 18, 2009	3	3:32	Las Vegas, Nevada, United States	
Win	8–1	Ricardo Lamas	TKO (punches)	WEC 42	August 9, 2009	2	4:15	Las Vegas, Nevada, United States	
Win	7–1	Phil Cardella	Decision (split)	WEC 39	March 1, 2009	3	5:00	Corpus Christi, Texas, United States	
Win	6–1	Rafael Dias	TKO (punches)	WEC 36	November 5, 2008	2	2:54	Hollywood, Florida, United States	
Loss	5–1	Donald Cerrone	Submission (armbar)	WEC 34	June 1, 2008	1	1:30	Sacramento, California, United States	
Win	5–0	Isaiah Hill	Submission (rear-naked choke)	CCFC: Mayhem	May 17, 2008	1	2:46	Santa Rosa, California, United States	
Win	4–0	Andy Salazar	Submission (punches)	Palace Fighting Championship 7	March 20, 2008	1	1:02	Lemoore, California, United States	
Win	3–0	Noah Shinable	TKO (punches)	Cage Combat Fighting Championships	February 16, 2008	2	2:42	Sonoma, California, United States	
Win	2–0	Gigo Jara	Submission (rear-naked choke)	GC 73: High Noon	December 22, 2007	1	3:45	Sacramento, California, United States	
Win	1–0	Billy Terry	Submission (rear-naked choke)	GC 71: Lock-n-Load	November 11, 2007	1	2:10	Porterville, California, United States	

== See also ==
- List of male mixed martial artists
