= Ramsey Nijem =

American mixed martial artist (born 1988)

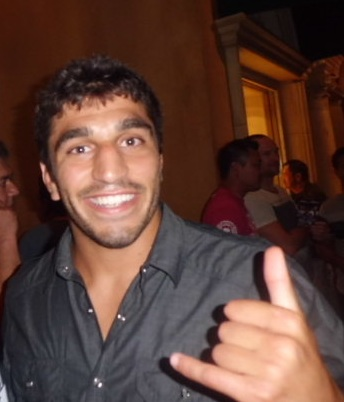
- Born: Ramsey Nijem; April 1, 1988 (age 38); Concord, California, United States
- Other names: Stripper
- Nationality: American
- Height: 5 ft 11 in (1.80 m)
- Weight: 171 lb (78 kg; 12.2 st)
- Division: Lightweight; Welterweight
- Reach: 74 in (190 cm)
- Style: Wrestling, Kajukenbo
- Fighting out of: Orem, Utah
- Team: The Pit (until 2013, 2016–present); Empower MMA (2013–2016)
- Wrestling: NCAA Division I wrestling
- Years active: 2008–2021

Mixed martial arts record
- Total: 19
- Wins: 10
- By knockout: 3
- By submission: 2
- By decision: 5
- Losses: 9
- By knockout: 4
- By submission: 3
- By decision: 2

Other information
- University: Utah Valley University
- Mixed martial arts record from Sherdog

Pedro Ramsey Nijem (Arabic: رامزي نجم, born April 1, 1988) is an American retired mixed martial artist. A professional MMA competitor from 2008 to 2021, Nijem is perhaps best known for his 10-fight stint in the Ultimate Fighting Championship. He was a finalist on The Ultimate Fighter: Team Lesnar vs. Team dos Santos and also competed in the Professional Fighters League (PFL).

== Early life ==
A Palestinian American, Nijem was born in Concord, California, but raised in Mill Creek, Washington, with two brothers. He attended Henry M. Jackson High School from 2002 through 2006. During those years, Nijem was a part of his high school's soccer, cross-country, and wrestling teams. His senior season in wrestling he went 27-5 and earned "Wrestler of the Year" honors. He was also wrestling captain for his junior and senior seasons.

After high school, Nijem enrolled in Utah Valley University, also wrestling for the school. Nijem graduated with a degree in business management in 2010.

== MMA career ==
Nijem began his training with Riven Academy of MMA in 2008. Electing to skip an amateur career, Nijem made his pro debut April 18, 2008, defeating Ryan Miller via first round rear-naked choke submission. After taking a nineteen-month hiatus from the sport, he returned losing to Gordon Bell via an armbar submission only 21 seconds into the first round.

Only a month after his first loss he defeated Logan Hancock via unanimous decision, bring his professional record to 2-1. Ramzi recorded his first TKO win in April 2010, defeating Eric Uresk at Showdown Fights: Burkman vs. Paul. He made his lightweight debut against Scott Casey, winning the fight via first round submission.

In June, 2011 at his UFC debut at the TUF 13 finale, Nijem walked out to the Matisyahu song "One Day." His choice of music was significant due to Nijem's Palestinian background and Matisyahu's Orthodox Jewish background, and the moment has been recognized for its "diplomatic initiative and message centered on peace."

Ramzi is now the Head MMA Coach at Ultimate Combat Training Center in Salt Lake City, Utah. Ramzi is also the Coach of the Fight Team there, and trains many fighters that compete in and around the state of Utah, and beyond.

=== The Ultimate Fighter ===
In 2011, Nijem had signed with the UFC to compete in The Ultimate Fighter: Team Lesnar vs. Team dos Santos.

Nijem was picked fourth on Team dos Santos and eighth overall. In the fourth preliminary match-up, Nijem was selected to fight Bellator veteran, Charlie Rader. In the first round Nijem controlled the fight by putting Rader on the fence, and obtaining a few last minute take downs. In the second round Nijem was able to take Rader down early and lock in a fight ending rear naked choke.

Nijem was selected to fight Clay Harvison in the quarterfinals. Nijem went on to win the fight by rear naked choke less than a minute in. In the semifinals, Nijem fought Chris Cope, defeating him via TKO in round two. The win moved him into the live finale for the chance to become the winner of The Ultimate Fighter.

=== Ultimate Fighting Championship ===
Nijem made his official UFC debut on June 4, 2011, at The Ultimate Fighter 13 Finale against Tony Ferguson to crown the winner of The Ultimate Fighter 13. Nijem lost the bout via KO in the first round after getting caught flush by a left hook. After the bout Nijem signed a nine-fight contract with the UFC.

Nijem defeated Danny Downes on October 29, 2011, at UFC 137 via unanimous decision (30-25, 30-26, 30-27).

Nijem was expected to face Anthony Njokuani on December 30, 2011, at UFC 141. However, Nijem was forced out of the bout, citing an injury and replaced by Danny Castillo.

Nijem faced promotional newcomer C.J. Keith on June 22, 2012, at UFC on FX 4. He won the fight via TKO in the first round.

Nijem faced Joe Proctor on December 8, 2012, at UFC on Fox 5. He won the fight via unanimous decision.

Nijem faced Myles Jury on April 20, 2013, at UFC on Fox 7. He lost the fight via knockout in the second round.

Nijem fought James Vick on August 17, 2013, at UFC Fight Night 26. He lost the fight via submission at 58 seconds in the first round.

Nijem next faced fellow TUF alumni and teammate Justin Edwards on January 15, 2014, at UFC Fight Night 35. He won the fight via unanimous decision.

Nijem faced Beneil Dariush on April 11, 2014, at UFC Fight Night 39. He won the fight via TKO in the first round. The win also won Nijem his first Performance of the Night bonus award.

Nijem faced Carlos Diego Ferreira on August 30, 2014, at UFC 177. He lost the back-and-forth fight via TKO in the second round. Despite the loss, Nijem was awarded his first Fight of the Night bonus award.

Nijem was expected to face Erik Koch on July 25, 2015, at UFC on Fox 16. However, Koch was forced from the bout with injury and replaced by promotional newcomer Andrew Holbrook. Holbrook defeated Nijem by split decision. 15 of 15 media outlets scored the decision in favor of Nijem.

On October 2, 2015, it was announced that Nijem was cut from the UFC roster.

=== World Series of Fighting ===
On August 29, 2016, it was announced that Nijem had signed a multi-fight deal with World Series of Fighting.

=== The Ultimate Fighter: Redemption ===
In February 2017, it was revealed that Nijem would compete again on the UFC's reality show in the 25th season on The Ultimate Fighter: Redemption. Nijem was the third pick overall for Team Dillashaw. He defeated Julian Lane in the opening round by TKO in the first round.

=== Professional Fighters League ===
On March 23, 2018, it was revealed that Nijem has signed a contract with Professional Fighters League (PFL). In his debut, he faced Brian Foster at PFL 2 on June 21, 2018. He lost the fight via TKO in the third round.

On October 13, 2018, Nijem faced Yuki Kawana at PFL 9. He won the fight via unanimous decision.

==== Season 2 ====
In May 2019, Nijem was expected to face Ronys Torres at PFL 2, but Torres was forced to withdraw on the fight week. By PFL rules, Nijem was declared the winner by walkover.

Nijem was expected to face reigning PFL lightweight tournament winner Natan Schulte on PFL 5, but could not make weight and was disqualified and removed from the card. Afterwards it was revealed that Nijem failed a drug test for marijuana and was temporarily suspended until disciplinary hearing. Nevada State Athletic Commission eventually suspended Nijem for nine months.

Nijem was rebooked against Natan Schulte in the lightweight quarterfinals at PFL 8 on October 17, 2019, losing the bout after being choked out by rear-naked choke in under a minute.

=== Post PFL ===
Nijem faced Ben Saunders on July 30, 2021, at XMMA 2. He lost the bout via unanimous decision and subsequently retired in early August.

== Championships and accomplishments ==
=== Mixed martial arts ===
- Ultimate Fighting Championship
  - The Ultimate Fighter 13 Tournament Runner Up
  - Fight of the Night (One time) vs. Carlos Diego Ferreira
  - Performance of the Night (One time) vs. Beneil Dariush

== Mixed martial arts record ==
Professional record breakdown
19 matches	10 wins	9 losses
By knockout	3	4
By submission	2	3
By decision	5	2

Res.	Record	Opponent	Method	Event	Date	Round	Time	Location	Notes
Loss	10–9	Ben Saunders	Decision (unanimous)	XMMA 2: Saunders vs. Nijem	July 30, 2021	3	5:00	Greenville, South Carolina, United States	
Loss	10–8	Natan Schulte	Submission (rear-naked choke)	PFL 8	October 17, 2019	1	0:52	Las Vegas, Nevada, United States	2019 PFL Lightweight Quarterfinal bout.
Win	10–7	Yuki Kawana	Decision (unanimous)	PFL 9	October 13, 2018	2	5:00	Long Beach, California, United States	2018 PFL Lightweight Playoffs Alternate bout.
Loss	9–7	Brian Foster	TKO (knee and punches)	PFL 2	June 21, 2018	3	0:32	Chicago, Illinois, United States	
Loss	9–6	Andrew Holbrook	Decision (split)	UFC on Fox: Dillashaw vs. Barão 2	July 25, 2015	3	5:00	Chicago, Illinois, United States	
Loss	9–5	Carlos Diego Ferreira	TKO (punches)	UFC 177	August 30, 2014	2	1:53	Sacramento, California, United States	Fight of the Night.
Win	9–4	Beneil Dariush	TKO (punches)	UFC Fight Night: Nogueira vs. Nelson	April 11, 2014	1	4:20	Abu Dhabi, United Arab Emirates	Performance of the Night.
Win	8–4	Justin Edwards	Decision (unanimous)	UFC Fight Night: Rockhold vs. Philippou	January 15, 2014	3	5:00	Duluth, Georgia, United States	
Loss	7–4	James Vick	Submission (guillotine choke)	UFC Fight Night: Shogun vs. Sonnen	August 17, 2013	1	0:58	Boston, Massachusetts, United States	
Loss	7–3	Myles Jury	KO (punch)	UFC on Fox: Henderson vs. Melendez	April 20, 2013	2	1:02	San Jose, California, United States	
Win	7–2	Joe Proctor	Decision (unanimous)	UFC on Fox: Henderson vs. Diaz	December 8, 2012	3	5:00	Seattle, Washington, United States	
Win	6–2	C.J. Keith	TKO (punches)	UFC on FX: Maynard vs. Guida	June 22, 2012	1	2:29	Atlantic City, New Jersey, United States	
Win	5–2	Danny Downes	Decision (unanimous)	UFC 137	October 29, 2011	3	5:00	Las Vegas, Nevada, United States	Return to Lightweight.
Loss	4–2	Tony Ferguson	KO (punches)	The Ultimate Fighter: Team Lesnar vs. Team dos Santos Finale	June 4, 2011	1	3:54	Las Vegas, Nevada, United States	The Ultimate Fighter 13 Welterweight tournament final.
Win	4–1	Scott Casey	Submission (rear-naked choke)	Showdown Fights: Respect	September 10, 2010	1	2:48	Orem, Utah, United States	Lightweight debut.
Win	3–1	Eric Uresk	TKO (punches)	Showdown Fights: Burkman vs. Paul	April 23, 2010	2	4:02	Orem, Utah, United States	
Win	2–1	Logan Hancock	Decision (unanimous)	Throwdown Showdown 5: Homecoming	November 20, 2009	3	5:00	Orem, Utah, United States	
Loss	1–1	Gordon Bell	Submission (armbar)	Xtreme Combat	October 24, 2009	1	0:21	Richfield, Utah, United States	
Win	1–0	Ryan Miller	Submission (rear-naked choke)	Throwdown Showdown 1	April 18, 2008	1	2:15	Orem, Utah, United States	

=== Mixed martial arts exhibition record ===
Exhibition record breakdown		
5 matches	4 wins	1 loss
By knockout	2	0
By submission	2	0
By decision	0	1

Res.	Record	Opponent	Method	Event	Date	Round	Time	Location	Notes
Loss	4–1	James Krause	Decision (unanimous)	The Ultimate Fighter: Redemption	June 21, 2017 (airdate)	3	5:00	Las Vegas, Nevada, United States	TUF 25 Quarter-Final round.
Win	4–0	Julian Lane	TKO (punches)	The Ultimate Fighter: Redemption	May 24, 2017 (airdate)	1	4:44	Las Vegas, Nevada, United States	TUF 25 Preliminary round.
Win	3–0	Chris Cope	TKO (punches)	The Ultimate Fighter 13	June 1, 2011 (airdate)	2	1:49	Las Vegas, Nevada, United States	TUF 13 Semi-Final round.
win	2–0	Clay Harvison	Submission (rear-naked choke)	The Ultimate Fighter 13	May 18, 2011 (airdate)	1	0:56	Las Vegas, Nevada, United States	TUF 13 Quarter-Final round.
Win	1–0	Charlie Rader	Submission (rear-naked choke)	The Ultimate Fighter 13	April 20, 2011 (airdate)	2	3:31	Las Vegas, Nevada, United States	TUF 13 Preliminary round.

== See also ==
- List of current UFC fighters
- List of male mixed martial artists
