= The Ultimate Fighter: Team Lesnar vs. Team dos Santos =

UFC mixed martial arts television series and event in 2011

- Genre: Reality, Sports
- Created by: Frank Fertitta III, Lorenzo Fertitta, Dana White
- Starring: Dana White, Brock Lesnar, Junior dos Santos
- Country of origin: United States

Production
- Running time: 60 minutes

Original release
- Network: Spike
- Release: March 30, 2011

The Ultimate Fighter: Team Lesnar vs. Team dos Santos is the thirteenth installment of the Ultimate Fighting Championship produced reality television series The Ultimate Fighter.

The UFC and Spike TV held open tryouts on November 4, 2010, in Las Vegas, Nevada. The casting call went out for Welterweight and Middleweight fighters, however, all fighters will be in the welterweight division. All fighters applying and trying out for the show must have at least three professional fights and be at least 21 years of age. Notables who turned up to the tryouts included Strikeforce veterans Karl Amoussou, Andre Galvao, and Zak Cummings, and former TUF contestants Frank Lester and Jeremiah Riggs.

It was confirmed during the Fight for the Troops 2 conference call that Brock Lesnar and Junior dos Santos would be the coaches for this season.

This season did not feature an elimination round like the two seasons before it, however, the "wild card" selections introduced in season 11 were still featured. The initial cast was 14 fighters rather than the usual 16, 28 or 32 in recent seasons.

On May 12, 2011, midway through the airing of the season, Dana White announced that Brock Lesnar pulled out of the coaches' fight due to the return of his diverticulitis.

== Cast ==
=== Coaches ===
Team Lesnar

- Brock Lesnar
- Marty Morgan
- Erik Paulson
- Rodrigo Medeiros
- Greg Nelson
- Chris Manos
- Matt Hughes (guest coach)

Team dos Santos

- Junior dos Santos
- Antonio Peinado
- Billy Scheibe
- Lew Polley
- Luiz Dorea

=== Fighters ===
- Team Lesnar

- Len Bentley, Charlie Rader, Tony Ferguson, Clay Harvison, Chris Cope, Nordin Asrih, Myles Jury (Chuck O'Neil)*

- Team dos Santos

- Shamar Bailey, Ryan McGillivray, Javier Torres, Ramsey Nijem, Zachary Davis, Michael "Mick" Bowman, Keon Caldwell (Justin Edwards)*

* Jury was replaced by O'Neil due to injury.

* Caldwell quit the show and was replaced by Edwards.

== Episodes ==
Episode 1: Something to Prove

- Dana White welcomed 14 fighters to the UFC training facility and announced that all 14 would automatically get into the house. He also announced the return of the wildcard format.
- The coaches for the season were introduced as Brock Lesnar and Junior dos Santos. They then went on to evaluate the fighters.
- During the evaluations, Jury got injured and was checked out by a doctor, who said that nothing was broken but still wanted to do an MRI.
- Both coaches met in White's office to go through the fighter picks via a coin toss (green for Lesnar, grey for dos Santos). The coin toss was won by Lesnar who chose to pick the first fighter, leaving dos Santos with first choice of matches.

Coach	1st Pick	2nd Pick	3rd Pick	4th Pick	5th Pick	6th Pick	7th Pick
Lesnar	Len Bentley	Charlie Rader	Tony Ferguson	Clay Harvison	Myles Jury	Chris Cope	Nordin Asrih
Dos Santos	Shamar Bailey	Ryan McGillivray	Javier Torres	Ramsey Nijem	Zachary Davis	Mick Bowman	Keon Caldwell

- Jury was told that he had a torn ACL and was forced off the show. White promised that he would get a second shot into the UFC after he heals up.
- Jury was replaced by Chuck O'Neil.
- Dos Santos announced that Bailey will face Asrih.
- Both fighters speak of their religious backgrounds, as Bailey is the son of a pastor and Asrih is a German-born Muslim.
- Shamar Bailey defeated Nordin Asrih by unanimous decision after two rounds.

Episode 2: Suck It Up

- Keon Caldwell struggled during an intense Team dos Santos training session and vomited. He told dos Santos that it was hard for him to be away from his family.
- Lesnar admitted that he expected to lose the first fight between his seventh pick Nordin Asrih and Team dos Santos' top pick Shamar Bailey.
- Caldwell told dos Santos the next day that he wanted to go home. Dos Santos, and later White, encourage to him to keep going. After initially agreeing to continue, Caldwell later changed his mind and left the show.
- Dos Santos announced that Javier Torres would face Chris Cope.
- Chris Cope defeated Javier Torres via unanimous decision after three rounds.

Episode 3: Chicken Salad

- Lesnar's "making chicken salad out of chicken shit" comment confused his team, but he recovered by telling his fighters they became chicken salad once they had made it onto the show, and he also told them to stay motivated.
- Justin Edwards, a former Bellator MMA fighter and 6–0 in his career, arrived to replace Keon Caldwell on Team dos Santos.
- Dos Santos' wrestling coach, Lew Polley, ran an intense training session that eventually resulted in Shamar Bailey being cut above the eye.
- Lesnar announced that Len Bentley would face Ryan McGillivray.
- Chris Cope was seen hanging out with Team dos Santos a lot, making the rest of the green team wonder what his motives were. Bentley seemed especially suspicious and asked Lesnar to talk to Cope, who told him to calm down and fight.
- Dissatisfied with Polley's training sessions, dos Santos reminded him that the competition is a team effort, not his own.
- Four hours prior to weigh-in, McGillivray weighed 180 lb, so he cut the weight in 45 minutes with dos Santos and Polley in an Epsom salt bath. Both fighters made weight at 170 lb.
- Maurício "Shogun" Rua paid a visit to dos Santos in support of the grey team and to watch the fight cageside.
- Lesnar was absent from the fight for personal reasons.
- Ryan McGillivray defeated Len Bentley by majority decision after two rounds.

Episode 4: A Bad Dream

- Lesnar returned after leaving before the Bentley-McGillivray fight and congratulated Len Bentley on his efforts. Lesnar showed a commitment to getting wins from his four remaining fighters yet to compete: Tony Ferguson, Clay Harvison, Chuck O'Neil, and Charlie Rader.
- Lesnar removed Harvison from a training session momentarily for looking distracted and not committed. He also was angry with Rader for the same reasons.
- Dos Santos announced that Ramsey Nijem would face Rader.
- Lesnar invited Matt Hughes as a guest instructor for wrestling techniques.
- Ramsey Nijem defeated Charlie Rader by submission (rear naked choke) at 3:31 of the second round.
- Lesnar and O'Neil were visibly upset. Inside the dressing room, Lesnar began to scold the team, prompting Bentley to storm out of the room.

Episode 5: Wow Me

- As Lesnar continued to scold his team after Charlie Rader's loss to Ramsey Nijem, Len Bentley came back into the room, and Lesnar questioned his toughness. He said that Chris Cope (the only fighter on the green team to win his bout through four preliminary fights) is the only one that has impressed him so far.
- Back at the house, Bentley continued to vent his frustration and showed his dislike of Lesnar.
- Dos Santos announced that Mick Bowman would face Clay Harvison.
- At a Team dos Santos training session, dos Santos was drilling boxing techniques when Lew Polley took over, leaving dos Santos unhappy with him.
- As Harvison trained for his upcoming bout, he was annoyed that Cope was watching him. Harvison said in a confessional he knew "a shady person" when he saw one.
- Someone wrote "Chris Cope Double Agent" in the sand in the zen garden. Cope asked his team whether they thought he was a spy or not, and most of the team said they had "suspicions." Later that night, Cope entered the team bedroom and blamed Tony Ferguson for the message in the sand, based on handwriting similarities. Things got heated and everyone was paranoid.
- Bowman confessed to a few of his teammates that he wrote the message, saying "it was only meant to be a bit of fun." Ironically, his motive was that he sometimes thought that Cope was hanging around his team to bring information back to Team Lesnar.
- Clay Harvison defeated Mick Bowman by unanimous decision after two rounds.
- During the fight, Harvison had blocked a switch kick with his hand, breaking his pinky finger with the bone sticking out of the skin. His TUF stint was in jeopardy.

Episode 6: Mean Streak

- During a sparring session, Len Bentley collapsed in pain holding his knee. Lesnar was bothered by the injuries his team was sustaining.
- Clay Harvison and Bentley were both at the hospital where they found that both their respective injuries were nothing too serious.
- Dos Santos discovered that Lew Polley tried to visit the fighters' house on his own which made him feel like Polley was overstepping his boundaries once again. He then asked fellow coach, Luiz Dorea, for advice. Following Dorea's advice, dos Santos decides to send Polley home.
- Lesnar announces the match-ups: Tony Ferguson vs. Justin Edwards and Chuck O'Neil vs. Zach Davis.
- Tony Ferguson defeated Justin Edwards by KO (upkick) at 3:56 of the first round.
- Zach Davis defeated Chuck O'Neil by submission (triangle choke) at 3:20 of the first round.
- The wildcard match is decided. Edwards was picked, but was told that he cannot compete due to being suspended by the athletic commission.
- The wildcard matches up Torres against O'Neil.

Episode 7: It's Just Good To Win

- Len Bentley of Team Lesnar was confused about why he was not chosen for the wildcard match. He confronted White about it but instead, asked for a rematch with McGillivray at the finale.
- Cope and Bailey got into a confrontation. Bailey stated that he was annoyed with Cope yelling "woo" and that he wanted to fight him.
- Dos Santos beats Lesnar in the Coaches' Challenge which involved football drills.
- After winning, dos Santos gave his share of the cash prize with members of the green team excluding Lesnar himself.
- Chuck O'Neil defeated Javier Torres by submission (d'arce choke) at 4:31 in the second round.
- The quarter-finals matches are announced:

- Clay Harvison vs Ramsey Nijem
- Chris Cope vs. Shamar Bailey
- Chuck O'Neil vs. Zach Davis
- Tony Ferguson vs. Ryan McGillivray

Episode 8: Shut Him Up

- Shamar Bailey confided to his teammate about a back injury he had.
- UFC middleweight Brian Stann arrived at the gym to give a pep-talk to the fighters.
- Ramsey Nijem defeated Clay Harvison by submission (rear-naked choke) at :56 in the first round.
- Cope asked his teammate Nordin Asrih for advice on fighting Bailey.
- Chris Cope defeated Shamar Bailey by unanimous decision after two rounds.

Episode 9: Then It Turned Ugly

- Chuck O'Neil tried to share the $5000 he earned in his finish bonus with his friend Charlie Rader. It is revealed that Rader owes child support and had not seen his child in over a year.
- Chuck O'Neil defeated Zach Davis via unanimous decision after two rounds.
- Davis returned to the house and reveals that he had suffered torn retinas in both his eyes. He said that the doctors have told him that he could no longer fight and that he would have to retire.
- Tony Ferguson defeated Ryan McGillivray by TKO (punches) at :46 in the first round.
- The semi-finals matches were announced:

- Chris Cope vs. Ramsey Nijem
- Tony Ferguson vs. Chuck O'Neil

- Both teams joined to party after the fights. Rader poured alcohol on Ferguson as a joke, but his teammate reacted badly. Both got into a heated confrontation, which led to Ferguson mentioning Rader's problems involving his estranged son.
- Members of both teams tried to break-up the fight. Ferguson left to cool off in the pool while the others comforted Rader inside, but when Ferguson came back, he started where he left off.
- The argument was finally settled, but both teams were angered and disgusted by Ferguson's actions.

Episode 10: The Biggest Test

- Tony Ferguson apologized to his team about his actions, but his team did not believe that his apology was sincere.
- Ramsey Nijem defeated Chris Cope by TKO (punches) at 1:49 in the second round.
- Tony Ferguson defeated Chuck O'Neil by TKO (punches) at 3:10 in the third round.
- Nijem and Ferguson were announced as the season's finalists.
- Following the conclusion of the episode, Lesnar phoned White to tell him that he had to pull out of his bout with dos Santos at UFC 131. White went on to say that Lesnar would be replaced by Shane Carwin.

== Tournament bracket ==
Preliminary Round
Shamar Bailey	UD
Nordin Asrih	2
Javier Torres	3
Chris Cope	UD
Mick Bowman	2
Clay Harvison	UD
Ramsey Nijem	SUB
Charlie Rader	2
Ryan McGillivray	MD
Len Bentley	2
Justin Edwards	1
Tony Ferguson	KO
Zach Davis	SUB
Chuck O'Neil	1
Javier Torres	2
Chuck O'Neil	SUB

Quarter-finals
Shamar Bailey	2
Chris Cope	UD
Clay Harvison	1
Ramsey Nijem	SUB
Ryan McGillivray	1
Tony Ferguson	TKO
Zach Davis	2
Chuck O'Neil	UD

Semi-finals
Chris Cope	2
Ramsey Nijem	TKO
Tony Ferguson	TKO
Chuck O'Neil	3

Finale
Ramsey Nijem	1
Tony Ferguson	KO

Legend
	Team Lesnar
	Team dos Santos
UD	Unanimous Decision
MD	Majority Decision
SUB	Submission
(T) KO	(Technical) Knockout

== The Ultimate Fighter 13 Finale ==
The Ultimate Fighter: Team Lesnar vs. Team dos Santos Finale
- The poster for The Ultimate Fighter: Team Lesnar vs. Team dos Santos Finale
- Promotion: Ultimate Fighting Championship
- Date: June 4, 2011
- Venue: Palms Casino Resort
- City: Las Vegas, Nevada
- Attendance: 2,053
- Total gate: $440,150

Event chronology
UFC 130: Rampage vs. Hamill	The Ultimate Fighter: Team Lesnar vs. Team dos Santos Finale	UFC 131: dos Santos vs. Carwin

The Ultimate Fighter: Team Lesnar vs. Team dos Santos Finale (also known as The Ultimate Fighter 13 Finale) was a mixed martial arts event held by the Ultimate Fighting Championship on June 4, 2011, at the Palms Casino Resort in Las Vegas, Nevada.

=== Background ===
Featured were the finalists from The Ultimate Fighter 13 – Team Lesnar vs Team Dos Santos in the Welterweight division.

Jonathan Brookins was expected to face Jeremy Stephens at this event, but was forced from the bout with an eye injury and replaced by Danny Downes.

The day before the fights, the UFC confirmed via Twitter that all six preliminary fights will stream live on the UFC's Facebook page.

=== Results ===
Main card (Spike TV)
Weight class				Method	Round	Time	Notes
Welterweight	Tony Ferguson	def.	Ramsey Nijem	KO (punches)	1	3:54	(Note: TUF 13 Welterweight Tournament Final)
Lightweight	Clay Guida	def.	Anthony Pettis	Decision (unanimous) (30–27, 30–27, 30–27)	3	5:00
Middleweight	Ed Herman	def.	Tim Credeur	TKO (punches)	1	0:48
Light Heavyweight	Kyle Kingsbury	def.	Fábio Maldonado	Decision (unanimous) (29–28, 29–28, 29–28)	3	5:00
Welterweight	Chris Cope	def.	Chuck O'Neil	Decision (unanimous) (30–27, 30–27, 30–27)	3	5:00
Preliminary card (Facebook)
Weight class				Method	Round	Time	Notes
Lightweight	Jeremy Stephens	def.	Danny Downes	Decision (unanimous) (30–27, 30–26, 30–26)	3	5:00
Featherweight	George Roop	def.	Josh Grispi	TKO (body punch)	3	3:14	(Note: This bout aired on the broadcast following the Kingsbury vs Maldonado bout.)
Welterweight	Shamar Bailey	def.	Ryan McGillivray	Decision (unanimous) (30–27, 30–27, 30–27)	3	5:00
Welterweight	Clay Harvison	def.	Justin Edwards	Decision (split) (28–29, 29–28, 29–28)	3	5:00
Bantamweight	Scott Jorgensen	def.	Ken Stone	KO (punches)	1	4:01	(Note: This bout aired on the broadcast following the Herman vs Credeur bout.)
Bantamweight	Reuben Duran	def.	Francisco Rivera	Submission (rear-naked choke)	3	1:57

=== Bonus awards ===
The following fighters received $40,000 bonuses.

- Fight of the Night: Kyle Kingsbury vs. Fabio Maldonado
- Knockout of the Night: Tony Ferguson
- Submission of the Night: Reuben Duran

=== Reported payout ===
The following is the reported payout to the fighters as reported to the Nevada State Athletic Commission. It does not include sponsor money or "locker room" bonuses often given by the UFC and also do not include the UFC's traditional "fight night" bonuses.

- Clay Guida: $74,000 ($37,000 win bonus) def. Anthony Pettis: $10,000
- Tony Ferguson: $16,000 ($8,000 win bonus) def. Ramsey Nijem: $8,000
- Ed Herman: $48,000 ($24,000 win bonus) def. Tim Credeur: $10,000
- Kyle Kingsbury: $20,000 ($10,000 win bonus) def. Fabio Maldonado: $10,000
- Chris Cope: $16,000 ($8,000 win bonus) def. Chuck O'Neil: $8,000
- Jeremy Stephens: $40,000 ($20,000 win bonus) def. Danny Downes: $4,000
- George Roop: $12,000 ($6,000 win bonus) def. Josh Grispi: $15,000
- Shamar Bailey: $16,000 ($8,000 win bonus) def. Ryan McGillivray: $8,000
- Clay Harvison: $16,000 ($8,000 win bonus) def. Justin Edwards: $8,000
- Scott Jorgensen: $29,000 ($14,500 win bonus) def. Ken Stone: $5,000
- Reuben Duran: $12,000 ($6,000 win bonus) def. Francisco Rivera: $4,000

== See also ==
- The Ultimate Fighter
- List of current UFC fighters
- List of UFC events
- 2011 in UFC
