= UFC 177 =

UFC mixed martial arts event in 2014

UFC 177: Dillashaw vs. Soto
- The poster for UFC 177: Dillashaw vs. Soto
- Promotion: Ultimate Fighting Championship
- Date: August 30, 2014
- Venue: Sleep Train Arena
- City: Sacramento, California
- Attendance: 11,100
- Total gate: $700,000
- Buyrate: 125,000

Event chronology
UFC Fight Night: Henderson vs. dos Anjos	UFC 177: Dillashaw vs. Soto	UFC Fight Night: Jacaré vs. Mousasi

UFC 177: Dillashaw vs. Soto was a mixed martial arts event held on August 30, 2014, at the Sleep Train Arena in Sacramento, California.

== Background ==
The event was originally planned to take place at the MGM Grand Garden Arena in Las Vegas, Nevada, with a Light Heavyweight Championship rematch between the champion at the time Jon Jones and challenger Alexander Gustafsson targeted as the event headliner. However, that bout was pushed back a month and scheduled to headline UFC 178.

A Bantamweight Championship rematch between current champion T.J. Dillashaw and former champion Renan Barão was expected to headline this show. Their first fight, contested at UFC 173, ended in a fifth round TKO victory for Dillashaw. However, the day of the weigh ins, Barão had to be admitted to the hospital as a result of his attempts to cut weight. Dillashaw faced UFC newcomer Joe Soto in the main event. Subsequently, Soto's opponent, Anthony Birchak, was removed from the card entirely.

Demetrious Johnson was expected to defend his Flyweight Championship against Chris Cariaso in the co-main event. However, on August 12, it was announced that bout would be moved to headline UFC 178 after Jon Jones against Daniel Cormier was delayed due to injury.

As a result of the cancellation of UFC 176, bouts between Danny Castillo vs. Tony Ferguson, Lorenz Larkin vs. Derek Brunson and Bethe Correia vs. Shayna Baszler were rescheduled for this event.

A heavyweight matchup between Ruslan Magomedov and Richard Odoms was official for this event. However on August 18, Odoms was forced to withdraw and the match was cancelled.

Justin Edwards was expected to face Yancy Medeiros at the event. However, Edwards pulled out of the event in the days leading up to the event citing an injury and was replaced by newcomer Damon Jackson.

Scott Jorgensen was expected to face Henry Cejudo at the event. However, Cejudo pulled out of the bout on the day of the weigh ins due to complications trying to cut weight.

Due to the many unexpected changes, Joe Rogan began the event's weigh ins show by introducing the crowd to "the haunted UFC card". Due to several last minute cancellations, the event took place with only eight bouts on the card, making it the smallest UFC PPV event, since UFC 72 in 2007.

== Results ==
Main card
Weight class				Method	Round	Time	Notes
Bantamweight	T.J. Dillashaw (c)	def.	Joe Soto	KO (head kick and punches)	5	2:20	(Note: For the UFC Bantamweight Championship)
Lightweight	Tony Ferguson	def.	Danny Castillo	Decision (split) (28–29, 29–28, 29–28)	3	5:00
Women's Bantamweight	Bethe Correia	def.	Shayna Baszler	TKO (punches)	2	1:56
Lightweight	Carlos Diego Ferreira	def.	Ramsey Nijem	TKO (punches)	2	1:53
Lightweight	Yancy Medeiros	def.	Damon Jackson	Submission (reverse bulldog choke)	2	1:54
Preliminary card (Fox Sports 1)
Middleweight	Derek Brunson	def.	Lorenz Larkin	Decision (unanimous) (30–27, 30–27, 30–27)	3	5:00
Heavyweight	Anthony Hamilton	def.	Ruan Potts	TKO (punches to the body)	2	4:17
Lightweight	Chris Wade	def.	Cain Carrizosa	Technical Submission (guillotine choke)	1	1:12

== Bonus awards ==
The following fighters received $50,000 bonuses:

- Fight of the Night: Ramsey Nijem vs. Carlos Diego Ferreira
- Performance of the Night: T.J. Dillashaw and Yancy Medeiros

== Reported payout ==
The following is the reported payout to the fighters as reported to the California State Athletic Commission. It does not include sponsor money or "locker room" bonuses often given by the UFC and also do not include the UFC's traditional "fight night" bonuses.

- T.J. Dillashaw: $100,000 ($50,000 win bonus) def. Joe Soto: $20,000
- Tony Ferguson: $40,000 ($20,000 win bonus) def. Danny Castillo: $36,000
- Bethe Correia: $24,000 ($12,000 win bonus) def. Shayna Baszler: $8,000
- Carlos Diego Ferreira: $20,000 ($10,000 win bonus) def. Ramsey Nijem: $18,000
- Yancy Medeiros: $24,000 ($12,000 win bonus) def. Damon Jackson: $8,000
- Derek Brunson: $44,000 ($22,000 win bonus) def. Lorenz Larkin: $28,000
- Anthony Hamilton: $16,000 ($8,000 win bonus) def. Ruan Potts: $10,000
- Chris Wade: $16,000 ($8,000 win bonus) def. Cain Carrizosa: $8,000

Although not included on the CSAC's initial report, Scott Jorgensen ($52,000/$26,000) and Anthony Birchak ($16,000/$8,000) were paid a show purse and win bonus after their respective bouts were scrapped prior to the weigh-ins. As a result of their actions, Renan Barão and Henry Cejudo were not compensated.

== See also ==
- List of UFC events
- 2014 in UFC
