= George Sullivan =

George Sullivan may refer to:

- Red Sullivan (George Sullivan, 1929–2019), ice hockey player
- George Sullivan (Nebraska politician) (1900–1972), American politician from Nebraska
- George Sullivan (New Hampshire politician) (1771–1838), American politician from New Hampshire
- George Sullivan (American football, born 1897) (1897–1989), American football player
- George Sullivan (American football, born 1926) (1926–2016), American football player
- George Alexander Sullivan (1890–1942), founder of the Rosicrucian Fellowship
- George M. Sullivan (1922–2009), American politician from Alaska
- George H. Sullivan (1867–1935), American politician from Minnesota
- George F. Sullivan (1886–1944), American federal judge from Minnesota
- George Thomas Sullivan (1914–1942), one of five Sullivan brothers who died together in World War II
- George Sullivan (fighter) (born 1981), mixed martial artist
