= Senator Worthington (disambiguation) =

Thomas Worthington (1773–1827) was a U.S. Senator from Ohio from 1803 to 1807 and 1810 to 1814. Senator Worthington may also refer to:

- Denison Worthington (1806–1880), Wisconsin State Senate
- William Jackson Worthington (1833–1914), Kentucky State Senate
- Wilmer Worthington (1804–1873), Pennsylvania State Senate

== See also ==
- William Worthing (1909–1988), Nebraska State Senate
- Senator Worth (disambiguation)
