= Tim Means =

American mixed martial artist

- Born: February 20, 1984 (age 42); Wilburton, Oklahoma, U.S.
- Other names: The Dirty Bird
- Height: 6 ft 2 in (1.88 m)
- Weight: 171 lb (78 kg; 12 st 3 lb)
- Division: Light Heavyweight; Middleweight; Welterweight; Lightweight
- Reach: 75 in (191 cm)
- Fighting out of: Albuquerque, New Mexico, United States
- Team: Power MMA; Fit NHB
- Trainer: Tom Vaughn
- Years active: 2004–present

Professional boxing record
- Total: 3
- Wins: 2
- Losses: 1
- By knockout: 1

Mixed martial arts record
- Total: 52
- Wins: 33
- By knockout: 20
- By submission: 5
- By decision: 8
- Losses: 17
- By knockout: 3
- By submission: 8
- By decision: 6
- Draws: 1
- No contests: 1

Other information
- Boxing record from BoxRec
- Mixed martial arts record from Sherdog

Tim Means (born February 20, 1984) is an American professional mixed martial artist who competed in the Welterweight division of the Ultimate Fighting Championship. A professional competitor since 2004, Means has also formerly competed for King of the Cage and Legacy FC. Means is the former King of the Cage Lightweight Champion and the former King of the Cage Junior Welterweight Champion.

== Background ==
Born in Wilburton, Oklahoma, and raised in New Mexico, Means began training at the age of 12, as he was a troubled kid and was taken under the wing of a local trainer. In 2004, Means was involved in a shooting incident outside of a bar and suffered a nine-inch gunshot wound in the femoral artery of his thigh. Means was prescribed painkillers and morphine, and developed a morphine dependency. After Means's prescriptions ran out, he began experimenting with methamphetamine. A few years after Means began using meth, he found himself in trouble with the law, and was charged with aggravated assault after punching a man who broke into his home. After serving more than three years in prison early in his MMA career, Means turned his life around. He works as a high school wrestling coach at Moriaty High School.

== Mixed martial arts career ==
=== Early career ===
Means began his MMA career in 2004, recording a 3–2 record before serving a prison sentence. His two losses were to future UFC fighters Spencer Fisher and Luke Caudillo.

=== King of the Cage ===
Means returned to MMA in 2009 and reeled off six consecutive victories via first round stoppage, including a nine-second TKO win over Matt Green at KOTC: New Breed. He earned his first title at KOTC: Steel on Oct. 7, 2010 when he defeated Bobby Green to win the KOTC Junior Welterweight (160 lbs) belt. He defended the belt on four occasions, most recently in a first-round TKO victory over Mario Ramos at KOTC: High Performance on Nov. 19, 2011. He added the KOTC Lightweight title with a victory over Tye Brown at KOTC: Total Destruction on Jan. 21, 2012.

=== Ultimate Fighting Championship ===
Means made his UFC debut on February 15, 2012, defeating Bernardo Magalhaes by unanimous decision at UFC on Fuel TV 1.

Means overwhelmed Justin Salas on June 8, 2012, at UFC on FX 3, knocking him down multiple times before finishing him with punches in just over a minute.

Means was expected to face promotional newcomer Abel Trujillo on September 1, 2012, at UFC 151. However, after UFC 151 was cancelled, the bout was rescheduled for December 8, 2012, at UFC on Fox 5. On the day of the weigh-ins for the event, Means fell in a hotel sauna, injuring his head, and was replaced by Marcus LeVesseur.

Means lost a unanimous decision to Jorge Masvidal on April 20, 2013, at UFC on Fox 7.

Means, replacing an injured Bobby Green, lost a unanimous decision to Danny Castillo on July 27, 2013, at UFC on Fox 8, and was subsequently released from UFC.

=== Legacy FC ===
After his release from the UFC, Means was called to replace Danny Salinas in the main event against Pete Spratt on September 13, 2013, at Legacy FC 23. He won via first-round knockout. The win was not without controversy, as after the event Pete Spratt in an interview later claimed that it in the combination that knocked him out, the elbow had knocked him down but it was the follow-up punches to the back head, which are illegal, that knocked him out, and expressed he would appeal the decision. Means manager Tom Vaughn when asked for statement didn't respond for comment to the allegations.

Means then defeated Artenas Young via first-round technical knockout at Legacy FC 27, on January 31, 2014.

=== UFC return ===
Following two wins on the regional circuit, Means was re-signed by the UFC and lost a unanimous decision to Neil Magny in a welterweight bout on May 10, 2014, at UFC Fight Night 40, replacing William Macário.

Means beat Hernani Perpetuo by unanimous decision on July 26, 2014, at UFC on Fox 12.

Means won a split decision over Márcio Alexandre on December 20, 2014, at UFC Fight Night 58.

Means earned a Performance of the Night bonus for defeating Dhiego Lima via TKO in the first round on February 28, 2015, at UFC 184.

Means, replacing an injured Kenny Robertson, defeated George Sullivan via submission (arm-triangle choke) in round three on April 18, 2015, at UFC on Fox 15.

Means faced Matt Brown on July 11, 2015, at UFC 189. Despite finding some success via striking early in the fight, Means lost the fight by submission due to a guillotine choke.

Means faced John Howard on December 10, 2015, at UFC Fight Night 80. He won the fight via knockout in the second round. The win also earned Means his second Performance of the Night bonus award.

Means was expected to face Donald Cerrone on February 21, 2016, at UFC Fight Night 83. However, Means was pulled from the fight as a result of a violation of the USADA anti-doping policy. He was replaced by Alex Oliveira.

At the conclusion of his suspension, Means was expected to face Sean Strickland on August 20, 2016, at UFC 202. However Strickland pulled out of the fight in early August citing a knee injury. He was replaced by promotional newcomer Sabah Homasi. Means defeated Homasi by technical knockout in the second round.

Means faced Alex Oliveira on December 30, 2016, at UFC 207. The bout was halted in the first round after Means landed several knees to the head of Oliveira while he was considered a grounded opponent. As a result, Oliveira was unable to continue after the foul occurred. Subsequently, referee Dan Miragliotta judged that the foul was accidental, and in turn, the result was scored a no contest.

A rematch with Oliveira eventually took place on March 11, 2017, at UFC Fight Night 106. Means lost the fight via submission in the second round.

Means faced Alex Garcia on June 25, 2017, at UFC Fight Night 112. He won by unanimous decision.

Means faced Belal Muhammad on November 19, 2017, at UFC Fight Night: Werdum vs. Tybura. He lost the fight via split decision.

On December 20, 2017, Means announced he had signed a new, five-fight contract with UFC.

Means faced Sérgio Moraes on February 3, 2018, at UFC Fight Night: Machida vs. Anders. He lost the fight via split decision. Means was given win bonus.

Means faced Ricky Rainey on November 30, 2018, at The Ultimate Fighter 28 Finale. He won the fight via a technical knockout in round one.

Means faced Niko Price on March 9, 2019, at UFC Fight Night 146. He lost the fight via knockout in the first round, marking the first time he's been stopped due to strikes.

In the last fight of his prevailing contract, Means faced Thiago Alves on December 7, 2019, at UFC on ESPN 7. He won the fight via a submission in round one. Means signed a new contract with the UFC in the following week.

Means was scheduled to face Ramazan Emeev on February 15, 2020, at UFC Fight Night 167. However, Emeev was removed from the bout in late-January for undisclosed reasons and replaced by Daniel Rodriguez. Means lost the fight via submission in the second round. Means dedicated his fight to two teenage boys who had died in a car crash in his community. He had a special mouth piece made in their honor and claimed to have "fought his hardest" for them that night.

Means faced Laureano Staropoli on August 8, 2020, at UFC Fight Night 174. At the weigh-ins, Staropoli weighed in at 174.5 pounds, three and a half pounds over the welterweight non-title fight limit. The bout proceeded at a catchweight and Stropoli was fined 20% of his purse, which went to Means. He won the fight via unanimous decision.

Means replaced Robbie Lawler to face Mike Perry on November 21, 2020, at UFC 255. At the weigh-ins on November 20, Perry missed weight, weighing in at 175.5 pounds, over the non-title welterweight limit of 171.0 pounds. As a result, the bout proceeded at a catchweight and Perry was fined 30 percent of his purse, which went to Means. Means won the fight via unanimous decision.

Means was scheduled to face Danny Roberts on June 19, 2021, at UFC on ESPN 25. However, Roberts was removed from the pairing due to COVID-19 protocols in the days leading up to the event. Subsequently Means was shifted to face Nicolas Dalby at UFC Fight Night 190 on June 26, 2021. Means won the fight via unanimous decision.

Means faced Kevin Holland on June 18, 2022, at UFC on ESPN 37. He lost the bout in the second round after getting submitted with a D'arce choke.

Means faced Max Griffin on October 29, 2022, at UFC Fight Night 213. He lost the fight via a split decision.

Means faced Alex Morono on May 13, 2023, at UFC on ABC 4. He lost fight via guillotine choke in the second round.

Means faced André Fialho on September 23, 2023, at UFC Fight Night 228. He won the fight via technical knockout in round three. This fight earned him the Fight of the Night award.

Means faced Uroš Medić on April 27, 2024 at UFC on ESPN 55. He lost the fight by knockout in the first round.

Means faced Court McGee on October 5, 2024 at UFC 307. He lost the fight via a neck crank submission in the first round.

== Championships and accomplishments ==
- Ultimate Fighting Championship
  - Fight of the Night (One time) vs. André Fialho
  - Performance of the Night (Two times) vs. John Howard and Dhiego Lima
  - Tied (Thiago Alves) for third most bouts in UFC Welterweight division history (26)
  - Third most significant strikes landed in UFC Welterweight division history (1262)
- King of the Cage
  - KOTC Lightweight Champion (One time)
  - KOTC Junior Welterweight Champion (One time)
    - Two successful title defenses

== Mixed martial arts record ==
Professional record breakdown
52 matches	33 wins	17 losses
By knockout	20	3
By submission	5	8
By decision	8	6
Draws	1	
No contests	1	

Res.	Record	Opponent	Method	Event	Date	Round	Time	Location	Notes
Loss	33–17–1 (1)	Court McGee	Submission (neck crank)	UFC 307	October 5, 2024	1	3:19	Salt Lake City, Utah, United States	
Loss	33–16–1 (1)	Uroš Medić	TKO (punches)	UFC on ESPN: Nicolau vs. Perez	April 27, 2024	1	2:09	Las Vegas, Nevada, United States	
Win	33–15–1 (1)	André Fialho	TKO (punches)	UFC Fight Night: Fiziev vs. Gamrot	September 23, 2023	3	1:15	Las Vegas, Nevada, United States	Fight of the Night
Loss	32–15–1 (1)	Alex Morono	Submission (guillotine choke)	UFC on ABC: Rozenstruik vs. Almeida	May 13, 2023	2	2:09	Charlotte, North Carolina, United States	
Loss	32–14–1 (1)	Max Griffin	Decision (split)	UFC Fight Night: Kattar vs. Allen	October 29, 2022	3	5:00	Las Vegas, Nevada, United States	
Loss	32–13–1 (1)	Kevin Holland	Submission (brabo choke)	UFC on ESPN: Kattar vs. Emmett	June 18, 2022	2	1:28	Austin, Texas, United States	
Win	32–12–1 (1)	Nicolas Dalby	Decision (unanimous)	UFC Fight Night: Gane vs. Volkov	June 26, 2021	3	5:00	Las Vegas, Nevada, United States	
Win	31–12–1 (1)	Mike Perry	Decision (unanimous)	UFC 255	November 21, 2020	3	5:00	Las Vegas, Nevada, United States	Catchweight (175.5 lb) bout; Perry missed weight.
Win	30–12–1 (1)	Laureano Staropoli	Decision (unanimous)	UFC Fight Night: Lewis vs. Oleinik	August 8, 2020	3	5:00	Las Vegas, Nevada, United States	Catchweight (174.5 lb) bout; Staropoli missed weight.
Loss	29–12–1 (1)	Daniel Rodriguez	Submission (guillotine choke)	UFC Fight Night: Anderson vs. Błachowicz 2	February 15, 2020	2	3:37	Rio Rancho, New Mexico, United States	
Win	29–11–1 (1)	Thiago Alves	Submission (guillotine choke)	UFC on ESPN: Overeem vs. Rozenstruik	December 7, 2019	1	2:38	Washington, D.C., United States	
Loss	28–11–1 (1)	Niko Price	KO (punches)	UFC Fight Night: Lewis vs. dos Santos	March 9, 2019	1	4:50	Wichita, Kansas, United States	
Win	28–10–1 (1)	Ricky Rainey	TKO (punches)	The Ultimate Fighter: Heavy Hitters Finale	November 30, 2018	1	1:18	Las Vegas, Nevada, United States	
Loss	27–10–1 (1)	Sérgio Moraes	Decision (split)	UFC Fight Night: Machida vs. Anders	February 3, 2018	3	5:00	Belém, Brazil	
Loss	27–9–1 (1)	Belal Muhammad	Decision (split)	UFC Fight Night: Werdum vs. Tybura	November 19, 2017	3	5:00	Sydney, Australia	
Win	27–8–1 (1)	Alex Garcia	Decision (unanimous)	UFC Fight Night: Chiesa vs. Lee	June 25, 2017	3	5:00	Oklahoma City, Oklahoma, United States	
Loss	26–8–1 (1)	Alex Oliveira	Submission (rear-naked choke)	UFC Fight Night: Belfort vs. Gastelum	March 11, 2017	2	2:38	Fortaleza, Brazil	
NC	26–7–1 (1)	Alex Oliveira	NC (illegal knees)	UFC 207	December 30, 2016	1	3:33	Las Vegas, Nevada, United States	Means landed two knees to Oliveira's head while he was determined to be a grounded opponent.
Win	26–7–1	Sabah Homasi	TKO (punches)	UFC 202	August 20, 2016	2	2:56	Las Vegas, Nevada, United States	
Win	25–7–1	John Howard	KO (punch)	UFC Fight Night: Namajunas vs. VanZant	December 10, 2015	2	0:21	Las Vegas, Nevada, United States	Performance of the Night.
Loss	24–7–1	Matt Brown	Submission (guillotine choke)	UFC 189	July 11, 2015	1	4:44	Las Vegas, Nevada, United States	
Win	24–6–1	George Sullivan	Submission (arm-triangle choke)	UFC on Fox: Machida vs. Rockhold	April 18, 2015	3	3:41	Newark, New Jersey, United States	
Win	23–6–1	Dhiego Lima	TKO (punches)	UFC 184	February 28, 2015	1	2:17	Los Angeles, California, United States	Performance of the Night.
Win	22–6–1	Márcio Alexandre Jr.	Decision (split)	UFC Fight Night: Machida vs. Dollaway	December 20, 2014	3	5:00	Barueri, Brazil	
Win	21–6–1	Hernani Perpétuo	Decision (unanimous)	UFC on Fox: Lawler vs. Brown	July 26, 2014	3	5:00	San Jose, California, United States	
Loss	20–6–1	Neil Magny	Decision (unanimous)	UFC Fight Night: Brown vs. Silva	May 10, 2014	3	5:00	Cincinnati, Ohio, United States	
Win	20–5–1	Artenas Young	TKO (punches)	Legacy FC 27	January 31, 2014	1	1:38	Houston, Texas, United States	
Win	19–5–1	Pete Spratt	KO (elbows and punches)	Legacy FC 23	September 13, 2013	1	2:24	San Antonio, Texas, United States	Return to Welterweight.
Loss	18–5–1	Danny Castillo	Decision (unanimous)	UFC on Fox: Johnson vs. Moraga	July 27, 2013	3	5:00	Seattle, Washington, United States	Catchweight (160 lb) bout; Means missed weight.
Loss	18–4–1	Jorge Masvidal	Decision (unanimous)	UFC on Fox: Henderson vs. Melendez	April 20, 2013	3	5:00	San Jose, California, United States	
Win	18–3–1	Justin Salas	TKO (knee and punches)	UFC on FX: Johnson vs. McCall	June 8, 2012	1	1:06	Sunrise, Florida, United States	
Win	17–3–1	Bernardo Magalhães	Decision (unanimous)	UFC on Fuel TV: Sanchez vs. Ellenberger	February 15, 2012	3	5:00	Omaha, Nebraska, United States	
Win	16–3–1	Tye Brown	TKO (punches)	KOTC: Total Destruction	January 21, 2012	1	0:30	Thackerville, Oklahoma, United States	Won the vacant KOTC Lightweight Championship.
Win	15–3–1	Mario Ramos	TKO (punches)	KOTC: High Performance	November 19, 2011	1	1:07	Santa Fe, New Mexico, United States	Lightweight debut.
Win	14–3–1	Cody Pfister	Submission (rear-naked choke)	KOTC: Kingpin	August 27, 2011	1	2:15	Lubbock, Texas, United States	Defended the KOTC Light Welterweight Championship.
Win	13–3–1	Cris Leyva	TKO (knees and punches)	KOTC: Fight to Live	May 14, 2011	3	1:28	Santa Fe, New Mexico, United States	Defended the KOTC Light Welterweight Championship.
Win	12–3–1	Ricky Musgrave	KO (punches)	ECSC: Friday Night Fights 2	February 11, 2011	3	4:53	Clovis, New Mexico, United States	
Win	11–3–1	Dom O'Grady	Decision (split)	KOTC: Steel	December 9, 2010	5	5:00	San Bernardino, California, United States	Defended the KOTC Light Welterweight Championship.
Win	10–3–1	Bobby Green	TKO (retirement)	KOTC: Inferno	October 7, 2010	2	5:00	Highland, California, United States	Won the KOTC Light Welterweight Championship.
Draw	9–3–1	Dom O'Grady	Draw (majority)	KOTC: Lock Down	July 30, 2010	3	5:00	Edmonton, Alberta, Canada	Welterweight bout. Means was penalized for an elbow to the back of the head.
Win	9–3	Cody Garlett	TKO (punches)	KOTC: Honor	May 14, 2010	1	1:17	Mescalero, New Mexico, United States	
Loss	8–3	Jaime Jara	Submission (guillotine choke)	KOTC: Legacy	March 26, 2010	1	2:19	Reno, Nevada, United States	
Win	8–2	John Cronk	Submission (rear-naked choke)	KOTC: Horse Power	November 28, 2009	1	0:46	Mescalero, New Mexico, United States	Return to Middleweight.
Win	7–2	Marcio Navarro	TKO (punches)	KOTC: Gunslinger	August 8, 2009	1	3:53	Concho, Oklahoma, United States	Welterweight bout.
Win	6–2	Matt Butterfield	KO (knee)	KOTC: El Lobo	May 23, 2009	1	0:04	Towaoc, Colorado, United States	Light Heavyweight debut.
Win	5–2	Matt Green	TKO (punches)	KOTC: New Breed	March 7, 2009	1	0:09	Mescalero, New Mexico, United States	Middleweight debut.
Win	4–2	Brad Nordquist	KO (punches)	KOTC: Rapture	February 28, 2009	1	2:07	Towaoc, Colorado, United States	
Win	3–2	July Guiterrez	Submission (rear-naked choke)	Fightworld 4	March 26, 2005	N/A	N/A	Albuquerque, New Mexico, United States	
Loss	2–2	Spencer Fisher	Submission (triangle choke)	IFC 22: Eve of Destruction	March 5, 2005	1	1:44	Salt Lake City, Utah, United States	
Loss	2–1	Luke Caudillo	TKO (injury)	Ring of Fire 13: Bring the Heat	September 24, 2004	1	1:40	Castle Rock, Colorado, United States	
Win	2–0	Nathan Brown	TKO (punches)	Extreme Fighting Championships 2	May 1, 2004	1	N/A	Ardmore, Oklahoma, United States	
Win	1–0	Josh Barlowe	TKO (punches)	Rumble in the Desert	March 13, 2004	N/A	N/A	Grand Junction, Colorado, United States	

== Professional boxing record ==
3 fights	2 wins	1 loss
By knockout	0	1
By decision	2	0

No.	Result	Record	Opponent	Type	Round, time	Date	Location	Notes
3	Win	2–1	(Mexico) Adrian Lopez	UD	4	2 Apr 2011	(United States) Santa Ana Star Casino Hotel, Bernalillo, New Mexico, US	
2	Win	1–1	(United States) Ramel Brown	MD	4	14 Aug 2010	(United States) Santa Ana Star Casino Hotel, Bernalillo, New Mexico, US	
1	Loss	0–1	(United States) Jonathan Embry	TKO	2 (4), 2:15	27 Apr 2006	(United States) San Manuel Casino, Highland, California, US	

== See also ==
- List of male mixed martial artists
