= Igor Araújo =

Brazilian mixed martial arts fighter

- Born: 6 December 1980 (age 45); Brasília, Brazil
- Height: 6 ft 1 in (1.85 m)
- Weight: 170 lb (77 kg; 12 st)
- Division: Light Heavyweight; Middleweight; Welterweight
- Reach: 77 in (200 cm)
- Fighting out of: Albuquerque, New Mexico, United States
- Team: Jackson-Wink MMA
- Rank: Black belt in Brazilian Jiu-Jitsu under Aldo "Caveirinha" Januário
- Years active: 2004-present

Mixed martial arts record
- Total: 36
- Wins: 25
- By knockout: 1
- By submission: 17
- By decision: 7
- Losses: 10
- By knockout: 4
- By submission: 2
- By decision: 4
- No contests: 1

Other information
- Mixed martial arts record from Sherdog

Igor Araújo (born 6 December 1980) is a Brazilian professional mixed martial artist currently competing in the Welterweight division. A professional competitor since 2004, Araújo has formerly competed for the UFC, M-1 Global, Shooto, KSW, and was a contestant on The Ultimate Fighter: Team Carwin vs. Team Nelson.

== Background ==
Originally from Brasília, Brazil, Araújo competed in football until the age of 19 when he began turning his focus to mixed martial arts. Araújo also holds an accomplished background in Brazilian jiu-jitsu; Araújo is a black belt and has won numerous titles in the sport including the European and Brazilian championships.

== Mixed martial arts career ==
=== Early career ===
Araújo made his professional MMA debut in 2004 and compiled a record of 23-6 before invited to compete on The Ultimate Fighter: Team Carwin vs. Team Nelson.

=== The Ultimate Fighter ===
Araújo defeated Cortez Coleman in the entry round via triangle choke submission in a "sudden death" overtime and was picked 13th overall by Team Carwin.

Araújo defeated Nic Herron-Webb in the quarterfinals via majority decision. Araújo then faced eventual season winner Colton Smith in the semifinals, and was defeated via unanimous decision.

=== Ultimate Fighting Championship ===
Araújo made his official debut at UFC Fight Night 29 on 9 October 2013 against Ildemar Alcântara. Araújo won via unanimous decision.

Araújo made his next appearance on 8 March 2014 at UFC Fight Night 37 against Danny Mitchell. Araújo won via unanimous decision.

Araújo faced George Sullivan on 13 September 2014 at UFC Fight Night 51 on 13 September 2014. Araújo lost via knockout in the second round.

Araújo faced Sean Strickland on 15 July 2015 at UFC Fight Night 71. He lost the fight by unanimous decision. Some months after this loss, he was cut from the UFC.

== Mixed martial arts record ==
Professional record breakdown
36 matches	25 wins	10 losses
By knockout	1	4
By submission	17	2
By decision	7	4
No contests	1	

Res.	Record	Opponent	Method	Event	Date	Round	Time	Location	Notes
Loss	25–10 (1)	Gerardo Nunez	KO (punches)	AFL 14: Outbreak	17 March 2018	1	2:43	Canary Islands, Spain	
Loss	25–9 (1)	Marvin Vettori	Submission (guillotine choke)	Venator FC 3	21 May 2016	1	1:13	Milan, Italy	Middleweight bout.
Loss	25–8 (1)	Sean Strickland	Decision (unanimous)	UFC Fight Night: Mir vs. Duffee	15 July 2015	3	5:00	San Diego, California, United States	
Loss	25–7 (1)	George Sullivan	KO (punches)	UFC Fight Night: Bigfoot vs. Arlovski	13 September 2014	2	2:31	Brasília, Brazil	
Win	25–6 (1)	Danny Mitchell	Decision (unanimous)	UFC Fight Night: Gustafsson vs. Manuwa	8 March 2014	3	5:00	London, England	
Win	24–6 (1)	Ildemar Alcântara	Decision (unanimous)	UFC Fight Night: Maia vs. Shields	9 October 2013	3	5:00	São Paulo, Brazil	
Win	23–6 (1)	Nic Herron-Webb	Decision (unanimous)	Flawless FC 3: California Love	18 May 2013	5	5:00	Inglewood, California, United States	Won the Flawless FC Welterweight Championship.
Win	22–6 (1)	Uriel Loutina	Submission (arm-triangle choke)	WUFC: Memorial 7	15 November 2011	2	4:10	Martigny, Switzerland	
Win	21–6 (1)	Ivica Truscek	Submission (rear-naked choke)	Lions FC: Lions Fighting Championship	15 October 2011	2	4:44	Neuchâtel, Switzerland	
Win	20–6 (1)	Vitaliy Ostrovskiy	Submission (rear-naked choke)	RF: Real Fight-FC	25 March 2011	3	4:12	Minsk, Belarus	
Loss	19–6 (1)	Rashid Magomedov	Decision (unanimous)	M-1 Challenge 21: Guram vs. Garner	28 October 2010	3	5:00	Saint Petersburg, Russia	
Win	19–5 (1)	Dejan Milosevic	Submission (armbar)	SHC 3: Carmont vs. Zahariev	18 September 2010	1	2:50	Geneva, Switzerland	
Win	18–5 (1)	Raymond Jarman	Decision (unanimous)	Yamabushi: Combat Sport Night 6	1 May 2010	2	5:00	Geneva, Switzerland	
Win	17–5 (1)	Vaidas Valancius	Submission (arm-triangle choke)	SHC 2: Battle for the Belt	10 April 2010	1	0:47	Geneva, Switzerland	
Win	16–5 (1)	Wilhelm Ott	Submission (arm-triangle choke)	VFN: Fabulous Las Vegas	24 January 2010	1	1:42	Vienna, Austria	
Win	15–5 (1)	Karim Mammar	Submission (armbar)	SHC 1: Angels or Demons	26 September 2009	1	4:50	Geneva, Switzerland	
Win	14–5 (1)	Michele Verginelli	Decision (majority)	XC 1: Xtreme MMA Championship	18 June 2009	3	5:00	Rome, Italy	
Win	13–5 (1)	Lopez Owonyebe	KO (knee)	Yamabushi: Combat Sport Night 5	2 May 2009	1	1:29	Geneva, Switzerland	
Win	12–5 (1)	Vener Galiev	Submission (armbar)	UF: Universal Fighter	12 December 2008	1	0:57	Ufa, Russia	
Loss	11–5 (1)	Jim Wallhead	TKO (punches)	M-1 Challenge 7: UK	27 September 2008	1	1:19	Nottingham, England	
Loss	11–4 (1)	Vladimir Yushko	Decision (unanimous)	FEFoMP: World Pankration Championship 2008	24 May 2008	2	5:00	Khabarovsk, Russia	
Win	11–3 (1)	Islam Merzhaev	Submission (armbar)	FEFoMP: World Pankration Championship 2008	24 May 2008	2	1:26	Khabarovsk, Russia	
Win	10–3 (1)	Sascha Kress	Submission (armbar)	FFC: All or Nothing	30 September 2007	1	0:42	Leipzig, Germany	
Win	9–3 (1)	Apo Gatta Gome	Submission (armbar)	Fight Fiesta: Deluxe 2	15 September 2007	1	N/A	Luxembourg, Luxembourg	
Win	8–3 (1)	Bastiaan Rejen	Decision (unanimous)	UG 4: 20 Years Anniversary	2 September 2007	2	5:00	Deventer, Netherlands	
Win	7–3 (1)	Marcin Krysztofiak	Submission (triangle choke)	FFL: Fight Fiesta de Luxe	2 June 2007	2	0:50	Luxembourg, Luxembourg	
Win	6–3 (1)	Sascha Kress	Submission (armbar)	FFC: Big Bad Boyz	29 April 2007	1	3:30	Leipzig, Germany	
Win	5–3 (1)	Tomas Stone	Submission (choke)	Shooto: Switzerland 5	28 October 2006	1	N/A	Zurich, Switzerland	
Loss	4–3 (1)	Krzysztof Kulak	Submission (rear-naked choke)	KSW 6: Konfrontacja	14 October 2006	2	3:25	Warsaw, Poland	Light Heavyweight bout.
Loss	4–2 (1)	Jean-Francois Lenogue	TKO (punches)	WFC: Europe vs. Brazil	20 May 2006	3	2:19	Koper, Slovenia	
NC	4–1 (1)	Boris Jonstomp	No Contest	CE: Championnat D'Europe	6 May 2006	2	5:00	Geneva, Switzerland	
Win	4–1	Hans Stringer	Submission (triangle choke)	Shooto Holland: Playing With Fire	2 April 2006	1	1:27	Ede, Netherlands	
Win	3–1	Santa Rita	Submission (kneebar)	Juiz de Fora: Fight 2	16 April 2005	1	0:32	Juiz de Fora, Brazil	
Loss	2–1	Edgard Castaldelli Filho	Decision (unanimous)	GOF: Goiania Open Fight 1	19 March 2005	3	5:00	Goiânia, Brazil	
Win	2–0	João Takeshita	Submission (kneebar)	GOF: Goiania Open Fight 1	19 March 2005	1	0:49	Goiânia, Brazil	
Win	1–0	Murilo Rosa Filho	Decision (unanimous)	CTR: Coliseu Tres Rios	11 December 2004	3	5:00	Belo Horizonte, Brazil	
