= Mike Rhodes (fighter) =

American mixed martial arts fighter

- Born: Michael Rhodes; December 4, 1989 (age 36); Waterloo, Iowa, United States
- Other names: Biggie
- Height: 6 ft 1 in (185 cm)
- Weight: 185 lb (84 kg; 13 st 3 lb)
- Division: Middleweight; Welterweight
- Reach: 74.5
- Fighting out of: Milwaukee, Wisconsin, United States
- Team: Roufusport
- Rank: Brown belt in Brazilian Jiu-Jitsu
- Years active: 2012–2019

Mixed martial arts record
- Total: 20
- Wins: 13
- By knockout: 5
- By submission: 4
- By decision: 4
- Losses: 6
- By submission: 3
- By decision: 3
- No contests: 1

Other information
- Mixed martial arts record from Sherdog

Michael Rhodes (born December 4, 1989) is an American former professional mixed martial artist. Rhodes competed in the UFC, Bellator MMA, Absolute Championship Berkut, and RFA and Cage Fury Fighting Championships.

== Background ==
Rhodes was born and raised in Waterloo, Iowa. He was a troubled youth who often got into fights and had anger management issues. He competed in basketball and football during high school at Waterloo East High School and Columbus Catholic High School in his senior year. He was talented, later continuing his basketball career in college at Ellsworth Community College. During college, Rhodes began training in cardio kickboxing in order to lose weight, losing 110 lbs before transitioning into a career in mixed martial arts.

== Mixed martial arts career ==
=== Early career ===
Rhodes compiled an amateur MMA record of 6–2 and was the Iowa Challenge Amateur Middleweight Champion before making his professional debut in 2012. Rhodes then went 6–1 as a professional and won the RFA Welterweight Championship, before being signed by the UFC. Rhodes signed with the UFC in the winter of 2013.

=== Ultimate Fighting Championship ===
Rhodes made his promotional debut against fellow newcomer George Sullivan on January 25, 2014, at UFC on Fox 10. Sullivan won the fight via unanimous decision.

Rhodes next faced Robert Whittaker on June 28, 2014, at UFC Fight Night 43. Rhodes lost the fight via unanimous decision.

Rhodes was next scheduled to face Paulo Thiago on September 13, 2014, at UFC Fight Night 51. However, Rhodes pulled out of the fight citing an injury.

Rhodes made his next appearance against Erick Silva on December 20, 2015, at UFC Fight Night 58 on December 20, 2014. Rhodes was defeated via technical submission due to an arm-triangle choke in the first round and was subsequently released from the promotion.

=== Post-UFC ===
After being released from the UFC, Rhodes returned to the regional circuit and faced Tom Angeloff at NAFC: Explosion on April 11, 2015. He won via knockout in the first round.

=== Bellator MMA ===
On February 28, it was announced that Rhodes would replace Chris Honeycutt in a bout against Kendall Grove at Bellator 174 on March 3, 2017. However, Rhodes was unable to make the required weight, and the bout scratched after they were unable to come to an agreement for the bout to proceed at a catchweight.

Rhodes next faced Rafael Lovato Jr. at Bellator 181 on July 14, 2017. He lost the fight via submission in the first round.

On February 20, 2018, it was announced that Bellator had released Rhodes from the promotion.

== Championships and accomplishments ==
- Resurrection Fighting Alliance
  - RFA Welterweight Champion (One time)
- Victory Fighting Championship
  - VFC Middleweight Champion (Current)
- Cage Fury Fighting Championships
  - CFFC Light Heavyweight Championship (One time)

== Mixed martial arts record ==
Professional record breakdown
20 matches	13 wins	6 losses
By knockout	5	0
By submission	4	3
By decision	4	3
No contests	1	

Res.	Record	Opponent	Method	Event	Date	Round	Time	Location	Notes
Win	13–6 (1)	Najim Wali	KO (punch)	CFFC 80: Rhodes vs. Wali	November 22, 2019	2	0:55	Newport News, Virginia, United States	Won the CFFC Light heavyweight championship.
Win	12–6 (1)	Christian Torres	Decision (unanimous)	LFA 68	May 31, 2019	3	5:00	Prior Lake, Minnesota, United States	Light Heavyweight debut.
Win	11–6 (1)	BJ Lacy	Submission (ankle lock)	Ascendancy FC 18	August 11, 2018	1	2:00	Waterloo, Iowa, United States	
Loss	10–6 (1)	Ibragim Chuzhigaev	Decision (unanimous)	ACB 87: Mousah vs. Whiteford	May 19, 2018	3	5:00	Nottingham, England	
NC	10–5 (1)	Bryan Baker	NC (elbows to back of head)	Extreme Beatdown: Beatdown 21	March 10, 2018	2	3:18	New Town, North Dakota, United States	Baker threw illegal elbows to the back of Rhodes' head.
Loss	10–5	Rafael Lovato Jr.	Submission (rear-naked choke)	Bellator 181	July 14, 2017	1	1:59	Thackerville, Oklahoma, United States	
Win	10–4	Rakim Cleveland	Submission (guillotine choke)	VFC 51: Emerson vs. West	June 24, 2016	2	2:42	Urbandale, Iowa, United States	Return to Middleweight; won the VFC Middleweight Championship.
Win	9–4	Mark Stoddard	Decision (unanimous)	NAFC: Super Brawl	January 30, 2016	3	5:00	Waukesha, Wisconsin, United States	
Win	8–4	Taki Uluilakepa	Submission (rear-naked choke)	Prestige FC 1: Atonement	October 24, 2015	3	3:54	Weyburn, Saskatchewan, Canada	Catchweight (175 lbs) bout.
Win	7–4	Tom Angeloff	KO (punch)	NAFC: Explosion	April 11, 2015	1	1:36	Waukesha, Wisconsin, United States	
Loss	6–4	Erick Silva	Submission (arm-triangle choke)	UFC Fight Night: Machida vs. Dollaway	December 20, 2014	1	1:15	Barueri, Brazil	
Loss	6–3	Robert Whittaker	Decision (unanimous)	UFC Fight Night: Te-Huna vs. Marquardt	June 28, 2014	3	5:00	Auckland, New Zealand	
Loss	6–2	George Sullivan	Decision (unanimous)	UFC on Fox: Henderson vs. Thomson	January 25, 2014	3	5:00	Chicago, Illinois, United States	
Win	6–1	Alan Jouban	Decision (unanimous)	RFA 10: Rhodes vs. Jouban	October 25, 2013	5	5:00	Des Moines, Iowa, United States	Won RFA Welterweight Championship.
Win	5–1	Benjamin Smith	TKO (punches)	RFA 8: Pettis vs. Pegg	June 21, 2013	1	0:56	Milwaukee, Wisconsin, United States	
Loss	4–1	Brandon Thatch	Submission (rear-naked choke)	RFA 7: Thatch vs. Rhodes	March 22, 2013	1	2:22	Broomfield, Colorado, United States	
Win	4–0	Quartus Stitt	TKO (retirement)	Madtown Throwdown 29: Unstoppable	January 5, 2013	2	5:00	Madison, Wisconsin, United States	
Win	3–0	Matt Gauthier	Submission (armbar)	RWC: Rogue Warrior Championships 3	September 6, 2012	1	4:04	Green Bay, Wisconsin, United States	Welterweight debut.
Win	2–0	Torrey Berendes	KO (punch)	Madtown Throwdown 28: Hells Bells	August 11, 2012	1	0:42	Madison, Wisconsin, United States	Catchweight bout of 180 lbs.
Win	1–0	Zak Ottow	Decision (unanimous)	NAFC: Colosseum	May 4, 2012	3	5:00	Milwaukee, Wisconsin, United States	
