= UFC on Fox: Henderson vs. Thomson =

UFC mixed martial arts event in 2014

- The poster for UFC on Fox: Henderson vs. Thomson
- Promotion: Ultimate Fighting Championship
- Date: January 25, 2014
- Venue: United Center
- City: Chicago, Illinois
- Attendance: 10,895
- Total gate: $863,655

Event chronology
| UFC Fight Night: Rockhold vs. Philippou | UFC on Fox: Henderson vs. Thomson | UFC 169: Barao vs. Faber 2 |

UFC on Fox: Henderson vs. Thomson (also known as UFC on Fox 10) was a mixed martial arts event held on January 25, 2014, at the United Center in Chicago, Illinois.

== Background ==
A lightweight bout between former WEC and UFC Lightweight Champion Benson Henderson and former Strikeforce Lightweight Champion Josh Thomson headlined the event.

Jared Rosholt was expected to face promotional newcomer Aleksei Oleinik at the event. However, Oleinik was forced out of the bout with an injury and Rosholt was pulled from the card altogether.

Pascal Krauss and Adam Khaliev were expected to fight at this event. However, both were forced off the card due to undisclosed circumstances.

UFC on FOX 10 had 2.55 million viewers, which was up from 2.44 million for UFC on FOX 9.

== Results ==
Main Card (Fox)
| Weight class | | | | Method | Round | Time | Notes |
|---|---|---|---|---|---|---|---|
| Lightweight | Benson Henderson | def. | Josh Thomson | Decision (split) (47–48, 48–47, 49–46) | 5 | 5:00 |
| Heavyweight | Stipe Miocic | def. | Gabriel Gonzaga | Decision (unanimous) (30–27, 30–27, 29–28) | 3 | 5:00 |
| Lightweight | Donald Cerrone | def. | Adriano Martins | KO (head kick) | 1 | 4:40 |
| Featherweight | Jeremy Stephens | def. | Darren Elkins | Decision (unanimous) (29–28, 30–27, 30–27) | 3 | 5:00 |
Preliminary card (Fox Sports 1)
| Bantamweight | Alex Caceres | def. | Sergio Pettis | Submission (rear-naked choke) | 3 | 4:39 |
| Bantamweight | Eddie Wineland | def. | Yves Jabouin | TKO (punches) | 2 | 4:16 |
| Bantamweight | Chico Camus | vs. | Yaotzin Meza | No Contest (overturned) | 3 | 5:00 | (Note: This bout was ruled a No Contest due to Camus testing positive for marijuana in the post fight drug test. Camus originally defeated Meza by unanimous decision (30–27, 29–28, 29–28).) |
| Bantamweight | Hugo Viana | def. | Junior Hernandez | Decision (unanimous) (29–28, 29–28, 29–28) | 3 | 5:00 |
| Lightweight | Daron Cruickshank | def. | Mike Rio | TKO (wheel kick and punches) | 2 | 4:56 |
| Welterweight | George Sullivan | def. | Mike Rhodes | Decision (unanimous) (29–28, 29–28, 29–28) | 3 | 5:00 |
Preliminary card (UFC Fight Pass)
| Heavyweight | Nikita Krylov | def. | Walt Harris | TKO (head kick and punches) | 1 | 0:25 |

== Bonus awards ==
The following fighters received $50,000 bonuses.

- Fight of the Night: Alex Caceres vs. Sergio Pettis
- Knockout of the Night: Donald Cerrone
- Submission of the Night: Alex Caceres

== See also ==
- List of UFC events
- 2014 in UFC
