= Senator Worth =

Senator Worth may refer to:

- Jacob Worth (1838–1905), New York State Senate
- John M. Worth (1810–1900), North Carolina State Senate

== See also ==
- Peter Wirth (politician) (born 1961), New Mexico State Senate
- Tim Wirth (born 1939), U.S. Senator from Colorado from 1987 to 1993
- Senator Worthington (disambiguation)
