= George Sullivan (Nebraska politician) =

American politician (1900–1972)

Member of the Nebraska Legislature from the 6th district
- In office January 7, 1941 – January 5, 1943
- Preceded by: Sam Klaver
- Succeeded by: Sam Klaver

Member of the Nebraska State Senate from the 4th district
- In office January 1, 1935 – January 5, 1937
- Preceded by: Joseph Bren
- Succeeded by: Position abolished

Personal details
- Born: September 14, 1900 Boston, Massachusetts
- Died: March 10, 1972 (aged 71) Omaha, Nebraska
- Party: Democratic
- Spouse: Mary Russell (m. 1942)
- Education: Regis College; Harvard University; Creighton University School of Law
- Occupation: Attorney

Military service
- Allegiance: United States
- Branch/service: United States Coast Guard

George Thomas Sullivan (September 14, 1900 – March 10, 1972) was a Democratic politician from Nebraska who served in the Nebraska State Senate from 1935 to 1937 and as a member of the Nebraska Legislature from the 6th district from 1941 to 1943. He served as acting Douglas County Coroner from 1947 until his death in 1972.

== Early life ==
Sullivan was born in Boston in 1900. After graduating high school, he moved to Montana, where he worked in a copper mine and became friends with Mike Mansfield. Sullivan campaigned in Wyoming for Nellie Tayloe Ross in 1924, when she was elected as the first female governor in the country. He attended Regis College in Denver and Harvard University, and moved to Nebraska in 1926, where he attended the Creighton University School of Law, graduating in 1931.

== Nebraska State Senate ==
In 1934, Sullivan ran for the Nebraska State Senate from the 4th district, challenging incumbent State Senator Joseph Bren in the Democratic primary. He defeated Bren with 57 percent of the vote. In the general election, he defeated Republican nominee James H. Walker and independent Simon A. Simon in a landslide, winning 62 percent of the vote to Walker's 29 percent and Simon's 9 percent.

== 1936 County Judge campaign ==
Following the consolidation of the State House and State Senate into the unicameral legislature, Sullivan opted to run for the Douglas County Court, challenging incumbent Judge Bryce Crawford for re-election. Sullivan, who placed second in the primary, advanced to the general election with Crawford. In the general election, Crawford defeated Sullivan by a wide margin.

== Nebraska Legislature ==
In 1938, Sullivan ran for the Nebraska Legislature from the 6th district, challenging incumbent State Senator William Worthing for re-election. Sullivan placed third in the primary, winning 16 percent of the vote to Worthing's 29 percent and attorney Sam Klaver's 26 percent. Klaver ultimately defeated Worthing in the general election by a thin margin.

Sullivan challenged Klaver for re-election in 1940. In a crowded primary, he narrowly placed second, winning 15 percent of the vote to Klaver's 35 percent. Sulivan defeated Klaver in the general election with 52 percent of the vote.

In 1942, Sullivan ran for re-election, and was challenged by Klaver, former county employee Patrick O'Connor, and L. N. Bunce. He lost outright in the primary, placing third with 23 percent of the vote to Klaver's 43 percent and O'Connor's 24 percent.

== Post-legislative career ==
After leaving the legislature, Sullivan enlisted in the U.S. Coast Guard during World War II. Upon the election of James J. Fitzgerald as Douglas County Attorney in 1946, Sullivan was appointed executive clerk of the office and as acting County Coroner. He served as acting County Coroner until his death in 1972.

== Death ==
Sullivan died on March 10, 1972.
