= Dan Miragliotta =

American mixed martial arts referee

- Born: October 30, 1963 (age 63); New Jersey, United States
- Other name: "Big Dan Miragliotta"
- Occupations: MMA referee, MMA judge

Dan Miragliotta (born August 30, 1963) is a professional mixed martial arts referee and judge from the United States, best known for officiating numerous bouts promoted by the Ultimate Fighting Championship (UFC), dating back to UFC 78. He was credited as one the best referees in MMA, as well as one of the most recognizable and active referees on the promotion in both 2022 and 2023. As of August 2026, Miragliotta has officiated 1,668 MMA fights.

== Martial arts background ==
Miragliotta started training Shitō-ryū karate at 14 years of age to recover from a surfing accident that caused two Vertebrae in his back to break. He would eventually begin competing in the sport and received his black belt when he was 18 years old. Miragliotta would then go on to train and compete in both Kenpo karate (in which he would eventually earn a 5th Dan black belt) and Doce Pares Eskrima, a Filipino stick fighting martial art. Miragliotta would eventually start training Muay Thai and shootfighting, becoming an instructor in both, under Vut Kamnark and Bart Vale (3rd level), respectively. He is also a Brazilian jiu-jitsu blue belt under Renzo Gracie.

== MMA referee and judge ==
=== Beginnings ===
Miragliotta began his career as an MMA referee in US Vale Tudo, a promotion based in Virginia, and would then go on to run his own MMA events in New Jersey, occupying the roles of promoter, organizer and referee (even becoming a boxing referee). Although members of the New Jersey State Athletic Control Board (SACB) attended events, they did not regulate them at the time. His work would lead to other promotions asking Miragliotta to referee at their own events. By the time the SACB began regulating professional MMA in the state, it is reported Miragliotta had already refereed more than 400 fights.

=== In the Ultimate Fighting Championship ===
Miragliotta would have his first appearance in the promotion on UFC 78: Validation, where he would referee five fights, including the main event: Rashad Evans vs. Michael Bisping. Since then, he has been "the third man" in many fights on several important events held by the promotion, among these:

- UFC 87:
  - Assignments:
  - Tamdan McCrory vs. Luke Cummo
  - Kenny Florian vs. Roger Huerta
  - Brock Lesnar vs. Heath Herring
  - Georges St. Pierre vs. Jon Fitch (main event)
- UFC 112:
  - Assignments:
  - DeMarques Johnson vs. Brad Blackburn
  - Phil Davis vs. Alexander Gustafsson
  - Anderson Silva vs. Demian Maia (main event)
- UFC 172:
  - Assignments:
  - Danny Castillo vs. Charlie Brenneman
  - Jon Jones vs. Glover Teixeira
- UFC 198:
  - Assignments:
  - Francisco Trinaldo vs. Yancy Medeiros
  - Stipe Miocic vs. Fabricio Werdum
- UFC 223:
  - Assignments:
  - Devin Clark vs. Mike Rodriguez
  - Chris Gruetzemacher vs. Joe Lauzon
  - Khabib Nurmagomedov vs. Al Iaquinta (main event)
- UFC 262:
  - Assignments:
  - Mike Grundy vs. Lando Vannata
  - Charles Oliveira vs. Michael Chandler (main event)

As of December 2024, Miragliotta's latest appearance in the promotion was UFC on ESPN: Covington vs. Buckley, where he officiated three fights, including the main event.

=== In other promotions ===
Although best known for his role in the beginnings of MMA and appearances in the UFC, throughout his career, Miragliotta has continued to work for many other MMA promotions such as: Bellator MMA, Professional Fighters League, Cage Warriors, Cage Fury Fighting Championships, Art of War, and Bare Knuckle Fighting Championship (BKFC), among others. He has also participated in many importants events in these promotions, most notably Bellator 180 and Bellator 214.

=== Controversy ===
While well-liked by most athletes, Miragliotta has been involved in several controversies throughout his time as a referee and judge. One of the most well-known was his stoppage of the main event of EliteXC: Primetime, Kevin Ferguson (better known as Kimbo Slice) vs. James Thompson. In the first round, Thompson was able to take Ferguson several times and control the pace of the fight. This happened again in the second round where, towards the end, Ferguson would be smothered and would take several shots to the head without referee intervention. In the third round, Ferguson punched Thompson hard, hitting him the ear and causing the cyst that was in it to burst open, which lead to a great amount of blood pouring out. Thompson would go on to take four more headshots before Miragliotta stopped the fight, 38 seconds into the round, although Thompson was still standing up and moving. The stoppage was heavily criticised, arguing an unprepared Ferguson was set up with an easy match-up that the promotion hoped he would perform well in. It was even argued that the match was "rigged" as the blood should not have been cause for a stoppage, since it was not in Thompson's eyes. Miragliotta would go on to defend his stoppage by claiming that his stoppage was not due to the blood, although it was "one of the most disgusting things I've seen in a fight". Instead, his justification for stopping the fight was that, by the look of Thompson's eyes, he was "out of it".

In 2011, Miragliotta admitted the only call he ever made he was regretful of was the highly criticized stoppage of the fight between Brandon Vera and Fabricio Werdum, on UFC 85. Late into the first round, Werdum mounted Vera and began punching him, Miragliotta stopped the fight with twenty seconds left in the round. He would later go on to declare that while Vera was trying to reassure him that he was okay, he misinterpreted it as a verbal submission. This decision would be heavily criticized by both fans and the media, with several attendees at the event and commentator Joe Rogan protesting the stoppage.

A third instance of controversy occurred at Bellator 227 (also known as Bellator Dublin). There, Miragliotta would referee the bout between Michael "Venom" Page (also known as MVP) and Richard Kiley. Page would win the fight via knockout from a flying knee. However, before this, Miragliotta would deduct a point from him because of "unsportsmanlike conduct" after he insulted his opponent. At the end of the fight, Miragliotta attempted to make Page and Kiley shake hands to show sportsmanship. However, Page would tell him to "fuck off". After this, Miragliotta would turn to one of Page's coaches and say "What a fucking piece of shit." before promptly apologizing. After the event, Page would demand an apology and Miragliotta would vow to never referee any of his future fights. Neither of them would be punished by the Mohegan Tribe Department of Athletic Regulation for their actions. The pair would later reconcile, although the decision to "never share the ring again" would be kept.

Miragliotta's next controversial moment would occur on UFC on ESPN 7, involving his handling and stoppage of the bout between Ben Rothwell and Stefan Struve. In the first round of the bout, Struve was winning the striking exchanges. However, he was hit with a low blow from which he took almost five minutes to recover. In the second round, Struve would be hit with another low blow which he would also take long to recover from. During this recovery time, Miragliotta would tell him that he was up two rounds to zero, and if he chose not to continue, his decision would be to declare the fight a no contest. The fight would continue with a point deduction to Rothwell. Shortly after the bout resumed, Rothwell would overwhelm Struve and Miragliotta stopped the fight when Struve crumpled to the canvas with three seconds left on the round. Miragliotta's words to Struve would be questioned, as many considered it inappropriate for a referee to advise a fighter. However, Struve would later defend Miragliotta, declaring that the referee was just trying to allow him to make a good decision.

The next time Miragliotta would become target of heavy criticism would involve him as a judge rather than a referee and would take place in UFC on ESPN 43. The card included a bout between Maycee Barber and Andrea Lee, in which Miragliotta would be a judge. Barber would go on to win the bout via split decision and Miragliotta's scorecards would draw negative feedback from both fighters and fans, as he scored the bout 30-27 in favor of Barber. This came into great contrast with Chris Lee's and Frank Collazo's scorecards, scoring the bout 30-29 for Lee and Barber, respectively.

Finally, UFC heavyweight Derrick Lewis has gone as far as to claim that he suspects Miragliotta is part of a conspiracy against him (although no substantial evidence for this claim has been provided). In Lewis's fights against Tai Tuivasa and Sergei Pavlovich, in UFC 271 and UFC 277, respectively, Lewis would complain about Miragliotta's decision to stop the fight. Regarding the bout against Pavlovich, commentators Joe Rogan and Daniel Cormier, as well as fighters such as Francis Ngannou and Belal Muhammad, among others, also regarded its end as an early stoppage. Dana White, CEO and president of the UFC, also considered the stoppage to be early but did not see it as a great mistake, commenting "Miragliotta made a mistake, but it happens."

In October 2025 at a UFC Fight Night event in Vancouver, Miragliotta drew criticism for two officiating sequences. Late in Round 1 of Kyle Nelson vs. Matt Frevola, he moved in as if to wave off the fight with roughly three seconds remaining, then allowed the bout to continue; UFC vice-president of regulatory affairs Marc Ratner said on the broadcast that Miragliotta told him he believed he’d heard the end-of-round horn. Nelson went on to win a unanimous decision. Later that night in the Mike Malott vs. Kevin Holland co-main event, Malott landed two low blows in the opening round; Miragliotta issued warnings and did not deduct a point, and the fight continued to a Malott decision, prompting further criticism of the officiating.

At UFC Vegas 123 on October 31, 2026, Miragliotta drew widespread criticism during the main event between Renato Moicano and Tom Nolan. In the second round, Moicano established dominant back control with a body triangle and was working for a submission, but Miragliotta interrupted the action and stood both fighters up, citing a lack of activity. The decision drastically altered the momentum of the bout, allowing Nolan to capitalize on the restart and secure a third-round TKO victory. The stand-up call was heavily criticized by fighters, commentators, and prominent officiating figures, including former referee John McCarthy, for penalizing a fighter in a position of extreme grappling advantage.

== Outside of mixed martial arts ==
Outside of mixed martial arts, Miragliotta has also acted as a referee in bare-knuckle boxing for BKFC and kickboxing for Gut Check Promotions.
