= Cage Fury Fighting Championships =

Mixed martial arts promoter based in Atlantic City, New Jersey

Cage Fury Fighting Championships (CFFC)
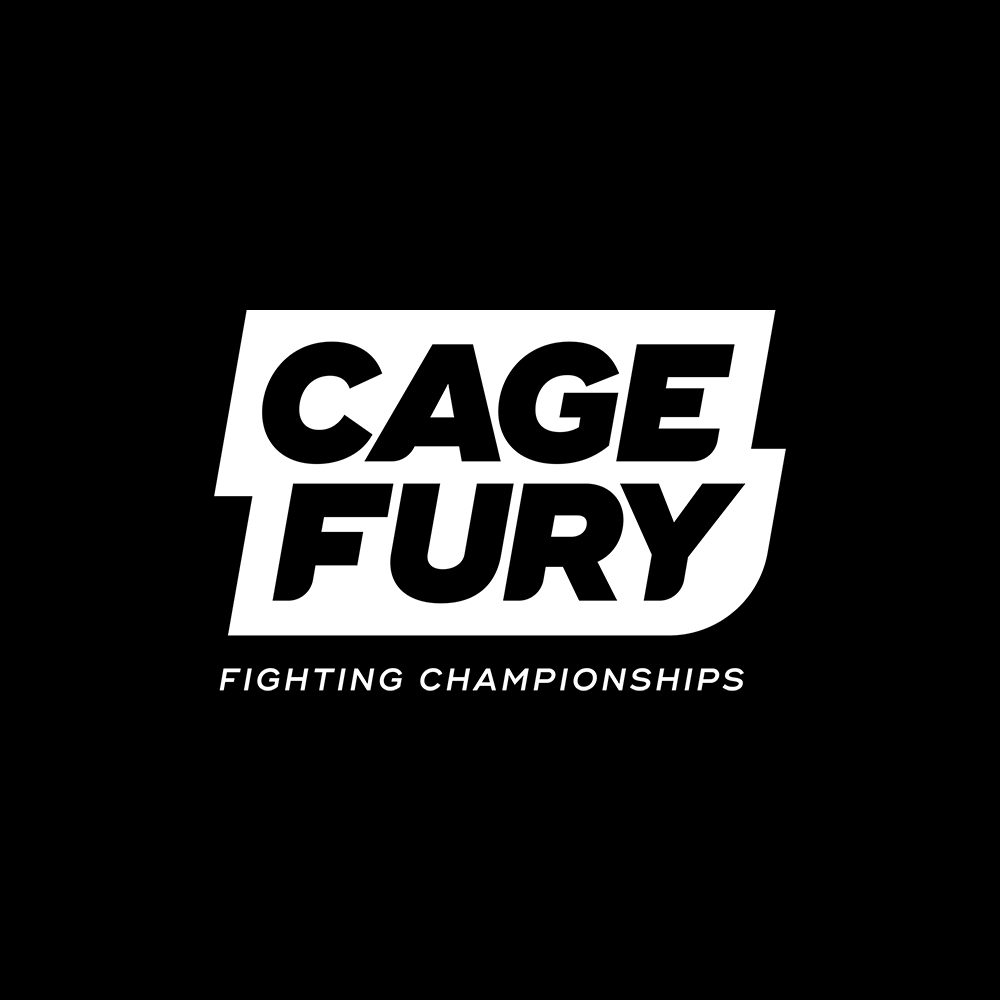
- Type: Private
- Industry: Mixed martial arts promotion
- Founded: 2006
- Headquarters: Atlantic City, New Jersey, United States
- Key people: Robert Haydak Jr. Brad Boulton; Arias Garcia; Jason Lederfine; Miranda Granger; John Morgan
- Website: cffc.tv

Cage Fury Fighting Championships (CFFC) is an American mixed martial arts (MMA) promotion primarily operating in the Northeastern United States, founded by Felix and Amy Martinez. They promoted their first shows in Atlantic City, New Jersey, launching the careers of fighters such as Kimbo Slice. The last-minute cancellation of its sixth event in 2007 signaled the promotion's temporary demise; however, it resurfaced nearly four years later when Vineland, New Jersey native Robert Haydak, Jr. purchased the organization and began promoting shows. Haydak, Jr. has since re-invented the CFFC brand, making it one of the top regional MMA promotions in the United States.

CFFC launched the careers of several Ultimate Fighting Championship (UFC) fighters such as Aljamain Sterling, Paul Felder, George Sullivan and Jimmie Rivera among others. They also played host to a number of other fighters who have appeared on the UFC roster such as Carmelo Marrero, Jim and Dan Miller, Nick Catone, Lyman Good, and Zach Makovsky.

== Current champions ==
Division	Weight limit	Champion	Since	Title Defenses	Next Fight
Heavyweight	265 lb (120 kg; 18.9 st)	(Brazil) Vitor Resende	March 13, 2026 (CFFC 151)	0	
Interim Heavyweight	265 lb (120 kg; 18.9 st)	(United States) Bevon Lewis	June 26, 2026 (CFFC 156)	0	
Light Heavyweight	205 lb (93 kg; 14.6 st)	(United States) Jon Cunningham	June 19, 2026 (CFFC 155)	0	
Middleweight	185 lb (84 kg; 13.2 st)	Vacant			
Welterweight	170 lb (77 kg; 12 st)	(Ukraine) Egor Kostyuchenko	September 4, 2026 (CFFC 160)	0	
Lightweight	155 lb (70 kg; 11.1 st)	Vacant			
Featherweight	145 lb (66 kg; 10.4 st)	Vacant			
Bantamweight	135 lb (61 kg; 9.6 st)	(United States) Lucas Seibert	April 17, 2026 (CFFC 135)	0	
Flyweight	125 lb (56 kg; 8.8 st)	(Israel) Moshe Aladi	May 29, 2026 (CFFC 136)	0	
Interim Flyweight	265 lb (120 kg; 18.9 st)	(United States) Xhelal "Jerry" Lleshi	September 11, 2026 (CFFC 161)	0	
Women's Bantamweight	135 lb (61 kg; 9.6 st)	(Brazil) Emily Martins	July 18, 2025 (CFFC 132)	1	
Women's Flyweight	125 lb (56 kg; 8.8 st)	Vacant			
Women's Strawweight	115 lb (52 kg; 8.2 st)	(Japan) Arisa Matsuda	February 6, 2026 (CFFC 150)	0	

== Cage Fury Fighting Championships Title History ==
=== CFFC Heavyweight Championship ===
Weight limit: 265 lb (120.2 kg)

No.	Name	Event	Date	Defenses
1	(United States) Carmelo Marrero def. Petrus Walker	Cage Fury Fighting Championships 1 Atlantic City, New Jersey	June 30, 2006	
Marrero vacated the title when he signed with the UFC.
2	(United States) Chris Birchler def. Joe Stripling	Cage Fury Fighting Championships 25; King of Prussia, Pennsylvania	June 22, 2013	
Birchler vacated the title.
3	(United States) Johnny Curtis def. Chris Birchler	Cage Fury Fighting Championships 28; Atlantic City, New Jersey	October 26, 2013	
Curtis vacated the title upon retirement from MMA.
4	(United States) Azunna Anyanwu def. Joe Stripling	Cage Fury Fighting Championships 32; King of Prussia, Pennsylvania	February 22, 2014	1. def. Keith Bell at CFFC 37 on June 28, 2014
5	(United States) Plinio Cruz def. Azunna Anyanwu	Cage Fury Fighting Championships 43; Atlantic City, New Jersey	November 1, 2014	
6	(United States) Azunna Anyanwu (2) def. Plinio Cruz	Cage Fury Fighting Championships 50; Atlantic City, New Jersey	July 18, 2015	
7	(United States) Daniel Spohn def. Azunna Anyanwu	Cage Fury Fighting Championships 53; Philadelphia, Pennsylvania	December 4, 2015	
Spohn vacated the title.
8	(United States) Azunna Anyanwu (3) def. Plinio Cruz	Cage Fury Fighting Championships 58; Atlantic City, New Jersey	May 21, 2016	1. def. Jose Pinto at CFFC 61 on October 29, 2016; 2. def. Shawn Teed at CFFC 63 on February 18, 2017; 3. def. Chris Daukaus at CFFC 73 on March 2, 2019
Anyanwu vacated the title when he signed with Bellator MMA.
9	(United States) Shawn Teed def. Ben Reiter	Cage Fury Fighting Championships 79; Atlantic City, New Jersey	November 16, 2019	
Teed vacated the title when he signed with Bellator MMA.
10	(United States) Jamelle Jones def. Cody Goodale	Cage Fury Fighting Championships 93; Philadelphia, Pennsylvania	March 12, 2021	
Jones vacated the title in June 2021 when he signed with the PFL.
11	(United States) Greg Velasco def. Kevin Sears	Cage Fury Fighting Championships 113; Bensalem Township, Pennsylvania	October 8, 2022	1. def. Ronald Coleman at CFFC 117 on March 31, 2023
12	(United States) Bailey Schoenfelder def. Greg Velasco	Cage Fury Fighting Championships 131; Atlantic City, New Jersey	April 12, 2024	
13	(United States) Anthony Guarascio def. Bailey Schoenfelder	Cage Fury Fighting Championships 141; Tampa, Florida	April 19, 2025	
13	(United States) Larry Gonzales def. Anthony Guarascio	Cage Fury Fighting Championships 141; Philadelphia, Pennsylvania	November 7, 2025	
14	(Brazil) Vitor Resende def. Larry Gonzales	Cage Fury Fighting Championships 151; Tampa, Florida	March 13, 2026	
–	(United States) Bevon Lewis def. Jackson Stanford for the interim title	Cage Fury Fighting Championships 156; Rockford, Illinois	August 18, 2026	

=== CFFC Light Heavyweight Championship ===
Weight limit: 205 lb (93.0 kg)

No.	Name	Event	Date	Defenses
1	(United States) Josh Rhodes def. Wayne Cole	Cage Fury Fighting Championships 1 Atlantic City, New Jersey	June 30, 2006	1. def. Lamont Lister at CFFC 2 on October 6, 2006; 2. def. Noah Inhofer at CFFC 5 on June 23, 2007
Rhodes vacated the title upon retirement from MMA.
2	(United States) Anton Berzin def. Jamelle Jones	Cage Fury Fighting Championships 65; Philadelphia, Pennsylvania	May 20, 2017	
Berzin vacated the title when he signed with Dana White's Contender Series.
3	(United States) Mike Rhodes def. Najim Wali	Cage Fury Fighting Championships 80; Newport News, Virginia	November 22, 2019	
Rhodes vacated the title upon retirement from MMA.
4	(United States) Luke Fernandez def. Peter New	Cage Fury Fighting Championships 128; Atlantic City, New Jersey	December 15, 2023	1. def. Gregg Ellis at CFFC 138 on December 13, 2024; 2. def. Christian Edwards at CFFC 142 on May 24, 2025
Fernandez vacated the title when he sign with the UFC.
5	(United States) Jon Cunningham def. Ian Russell	Cage Fury Fighting Championships 155; Philadelphia, Pennsylvania	June 19, 2026	

=== CFFC Middleweight Championship ===
Weight limit: 185 lb (83.9 kg)

No.	Name	Event	Date	Defenses
1	(United States) Dan Miller def. Lance Everson	Cage Fury Fighting Championships 2 Atlantic City, New Jersey	October 6, 2006	1. def. Jose Rodriguez at CFFC 4 on April 13, 2007
Miller vacated the title when he signed with the IFL.
-	(United States) Dante Rivera def. Erik Charles (for NABC title)	Cage Fury Fighting Championships 3 Atlantic City, New Jersey	January 29, 2007	1. def. Alex Aquino at CFFC 5 on June 23, 2007
Rivera vacated the title when he signed with the IFL.
2	(United States) Dustin Jacoby def. Tim Williams	Cage Fury Fighting Championships 16; Atlantic City, New Jersey	August 24, 2012	
Jacoby vacated the title when he signed with WSOF.
3	(United States) Tim Williams def. Ron Stallings	Cage Fury Fighting Championships 43; Atlantic City, New Jersey	November 1, 2014	
4	(United States) Anthony Smith def. Tim Williams	Cage Fury Fighting Championships 46; Chester, Pennsylvania	February 28, 2015	1. def. Tim Williams at CFFC 50 on July 18, 2015
Smith vacated the title when he signed with the UFC.
5	(United States) Kyle Daukaus def. Jonavin Webb	Cage Fury Fighting Championships 72; Atlantic City, New Jersey	February 16, 2019	1. def. Stephen Regman at CFFC 78 on September 21, 2019; 2. def. Nolan Norwood at CFFC 81 on February 1, 2020
Daukaus vacated the title when he signed with the UFC.
6	(United States) Collin Huckbody def. Aaron Phillips	Cage Fury Fighting Championships 90; Lancaster, Pennsylvania	December 17, 2020	
7	(Canada) Aaron Jeffery def. Collin Huckbody	Cage Fury Fighting Championships 93; Philadelphia, Pennsylvania	March 12, 2021	1. def. Rex Harris at CFFC 105 on January 29, 2022
Jeffery vacated the title when he signed with Bellator MMA.
8	(United States) Donovan Beard def. Miles Lee	Cage Fury Fighting Championships 111; Tunica, Mississippi	July 29, 2022	
9	(Jamaica) Gregg Ellis def. Donovan Beard	Cage Fury Fighting Championships 119; Tampa, Florida	April 20, 2023	
10	(United States) Kyle Daukaus (2) def. Gregg Ellis	Cage Fury Fighting Championships 124; Bensalem Township, Pennsylvania	September 2, 2023	1. def. Sean Connor Fallon at CFFC 129 on February 9, 2024; 2. def. Keanan Patershuk at CFFC 132 on June 14, 2024
–	(United States) Chris Brown def. Buddy Wallace for the interim title	Cage Fury Fighting Championships 143; New Town, North Dakota	June 6, 2025	
Daukaus vacated the title when he signed with the UFC.
11	(United States) Chris Brown promoted to undisputed champion	Cage Fury Fighting Championships 145; Atlantic City, New Jersey	August 30, 2025	
Brown was stripped of his title when he failed to make weight at CFFC 149.
12	(United States) Nick Galanti def. Austin Clayton	Cage Fury Fighting Championships 152; Atlantic City, New Jersey	March 27, 2026	
–	(Canada) Hunter Lee def. Jeff Craig for the interim title	Cage Fury Fighting Championships 155; Philadelphia, Pennsylvania	June 19, 2026	
Galanti vacated the title when he signed with the UFC.
Lee vacated the interim title when he signed with the PFL.

=== CFFC Welterweight Championship ===
Weight limit: 170 lb (77.1 kg)

No.	Name	Event	Date	Defenses
-	(United States) Tamdan McCrory def. Mike Littlefield (for NABC title)	Cage Fury Fighting Championships 2 Atlantic City, New Jersey	October 6, 2006	1. def. Anthony D'Angelo at CFFC 3 on January 19, 2007; 2. def. Nuri Shakir at CFFC 4 on April 13, 2007
McCrory vacated the title when he signed with the UFC.
1	(Puerto Rico) Carlos Nieves def. Joey Rivera	Cage Fury Fighting Championships 2 Atlantic City, New Jersey	October 6, 2006	
2	(United States) Mike Varner def. Carlos Nieves	Cage Fury Fighting Championships 3 Atlantic City, New Jersey	January 19, 2007	
3	(United States) Nick Serra def. Mike Varner	Cage Fury Fighting Championships 5 Atlantic City, New Jersey	June 23, 2007	
Serra vacated the title when he signed with EliteXC.
4	(United States) Chip Moraza-Pollard def. Joey Rivera	Cage Fury Fighting Championships 10; Atlantic City, New Jersey	July 23, 2011	
5	(United States) Greg Soto def. Chip Moraza-Pollard	Cage Fury Fighting Championships 12; Atlantic City, New Jersey	December 10, 2011	
6	(United States) George Sullivan def. Greg Soto	Cage Fury Fighting Championships 14; Atlantic City, New Jersey	April 14, 2012	1. def. Tenyeh Dixon at CFFC 16 on August 24, 2012; 2. def. Julian Lane at CFFC 19 on February 2, 2013; 3. def. Brandon Becker at CFFC 24 on May 11, 2013; 4. def. Jesus Martinez at CFFC 26 on August 17, 2013
Sullivan vacated the title when he signed with the UFC.
7	(United States) Jonavin Webb def. Dan Stittgen	Cage Fury Fighting Championships 38; Atlantic City, New Jersey	August 9, 2014	No contest against Lyman Good at CFFC 43 on November 1, 2014; 1. def. Elijah Harshbarger at CFFC 47 on March 7, 2015
Webb vacated the title when he signed with the UFC.
8	(United States) Lyman Good def. Micah Terrill	Cage Fury Fighting Championships 45; Atlantic City, New Jersey	February 7, 2015	1. def. Nah-Shon Burrell at CFFC 48 on May 9, 2015
Good vacated the title when he signed with the UFC.
9	(United States) Manny Walo def. Jeremiah Wells	Cage Fury Fighting Championships 56; Philadelphia, Pennsylvania	February 27, 2016	
Walo vacated the title when he signed with WSOF.
10	(United States) Sean Brady def. Tanner Saraceno	Cage Fury Fighting Championships 65; Philadelphia, Pennsylvania	May 20, 2017	1. def. Mike Jones at CFFC 68 on October 21, 2017; 2. def. Taj Abdul-Hakim at CFFC 72 on February 16, 2019
Brady vacated the title when he signed with the UFC.
11	(United States) Jeremiah Wells def. Marco Smallman	Cage Fury Fighting Championships 78; Bensalem Township, Pennsylvania	September 21, 2019	
Wells vacated the title when he signed with the UFC.
-	(United States) Bobby Lee def. Mike Hill for the Interim title	Cage Fury Fighting Championships 85; Tunica, Mississippi	September 18, 2020	
Lee vacated the title when he signed with Bellator MMA.
12	(United States) Bassil Hafez def. Christien Savoie	Cage Fury Fighting Championships 89; Philadelphia, Pennsylvania	November 19, 2020	
13	(United States) Evan Cutts def. Bassil Hafez	Cage Fury Fighting Championships 94; Philadelphia, Pennsylvania	April 1, 2021	
14	(Canada) Yohan Lainesse def. Evan Cutts	Cage Fury Fighting Championships 98; Philadelphia, Pennsylvania	July 3, 2021	
Lainesse vacated the title when he signed with Dana White's Contender Series.
15	(United States) Eric Alequin def. Hugh Pulley	Cage Fury Fighting Championships 106; Tampa, Florida	March 17, 2022	
Alequin vacated the title when he couldn't compete at CFFC 110.
16	(United States) Raheam Forest def. Collin Lubberts	Cage Fury Fighting Championships 115; Tunica, Mississippi	November 18, 2022	
17	(United States) Charles Radtke def. Raheam Forest	Cage Fury Fighting Championships 118; Philadelphia, Pennsylvania	April 1, 2023	
Radtke vacated the title when he signed with the UFC.
18	(United States) Blayne Richards def. Raheam Forest	Cage Fury Fighting Championships 136; New Town, North Dakota	September 27, 2024	
19	(United States) Eric Nolan def. Blayne Richards	Cage Fury Fighting Championships 142; Atlantic City, New Jersey	May 24, 2025	
Nolan vacated the title when he signed with the UFC.
20	(United States) Kevin Pease def. Ethan Pauley	Cage Fury Fighting Championships 147; Tampa, Florida	October 10, 2025	
Pease vacated the title to focus on a move to the lightweight division.
21	(Kyrgyzstan) Busurman Zhumagul def. Daniel Morrison	Cage Fury Fighting Championships 150; Philadelphia, Pennsylvania	February 6, 2026	
Zhumagul vacated the title to pursue additional opportunities.
22	(Ukraine) Egor Kostyuchenko def. Tyler Veal	Cage Fury Fighting Championships 160; Bristol, Virginia	September 4, 2026	

=== CFFC Lightweight Championship ===
Weight limit: 155 lb (70.3 kg)

No.	Name	Event	Date	Defenses
1	(United States) Al Buck def. Malachy Friedman	Cage Fury Fighting Championships 2 Atlantic City, New Jersey	October 6, 2006	
-	(Lithuania) Deividas Taurosevicius def. Dan Lauzon (for NABC title)	Cage Fury Fighting Championships 3 Atlantic City, New Jersey	January 19, 2007	1. def. Kevin Roddy at CFFC 5 on June 23, 2007
Taurosevicius vacated the title.
2	(United States) Jim Miller def. Al Buck	Cage Fury Fighting Championships 4 Atlantic City, New Jersey	April 13, 2007	1. def. Anthony Morrison at CFFC 5 on June 23, 2007
Miller vacated the title.
3	(United States) John Cholish def. Jameel Massouh	Cage Fury Fighting Championships 9 Atlantic City, New Jersey	June 10, 2011	
Cholish vacated the title when he signed with the UFC.
4	(United States) Charlie Brenneman def. Kyle Baker	Cage Fury Fighting Championships 28; Atlantic City, New Jersey	October 26, 2013	
Brenneman vacated the title when he signed with the UFC.
5	(United States) Paul Felder def. Marc Stevens	Cage Fury Fighting Championships 33; Philadelphia, Pennsylvania	March 22, 2014	1. def. Craig Johnson at CFFC 38 on August 9, 2014
Felder vacated the title when he signed with the UFC.
6	(United States) Nathan Vantassel def. Brett Martinez	Cage Fury Fighting Championships 39; Bethlehem, Pennsylvania	August 16, 2014	
Vantassel vacated the title.
7	(United States) Darrell Horcher def. Jordan Stiner	Cage Fury Fighting Championships 45; Atlantic City, New Jersey	February 7, 2015	1. def. Stephen Regman at CFFC 52 on October 31, 2015
Horcher vacated the title when he signed with the UFC.
8	(United States) Mike Pope def. Mike Wilkins	Cage Fury Fighting Championships 62; Philadelphia, Pennsylvania	December 17, 2016	
9	(United States) Joseph Lowry def. Mike Pope	Cage Fury Fighting Championships 65; Philadelphia, Pennsylvania	May 20, 2017	1. def. Richard Patishnock at CFFC 68 on October 21, 2017
Lowry vacated the title after being unable to defend due to automobile accident.
-	(United States) Cesar Balmaceda def. Damian Norris for the interim title	Cage Fury Fighting Championships 71; Atlantic City, New Jersey	December 14, 2018	
Balmaceda was stripped of his Interim title when he failed to make weight at CFFC 74.
10	(Brazil) Nikolas Motta def. Juan Gonzalez	Cage Fury Fighting Championships 79; Atlantic City, New Jersey	November 16, 2019	
Motta vacated the title when he signed with Dana White's Contender Series.
11	(Kyrgyzstan) Zulkarnaiyn Kamchybekov def. Jesse Smith	Cage Fury Fighting Championships 95; Philadelphia, Pennsylvania	April 2, 2021	
12	(United States) Blake Smith def. Zulkarnaiyn Kamchybekov	Cage Fury Fighting Championships 100; Tampa, Florida	September 16, 2021	1. def. Paris Artis at CFFC 106 on March 17, 2022
Smith vacated the title after he signed with Bellator MMA.
13	(United States) Cedric Gunnison def. Zulkarnaiyn Kamchybekov	Cage Fury Fighting Championships 117; Philadelphia, Pennsylvania	March 31, 2023	
14	(United States) Robert Watley def. Cedric Gunnison	Cage Fury Fighting Championships 122; Tampa, Florida	July 20, 2023	1. def. Armando Gjetja at CFFC 128 on December 15, 2023; 2. def. interim champion Morquez Forest at CFFC 133 on July 16, 2024 to unify title
-	(United States) Morquez Forest def. Robert Varricchio for interim title	Cage Fury Fighting Championships 131; Atlantic City, New Jersey	April 12, 2024	
Watley vacated the title when he signed with the PFL.
15	(United States) Jesse Roberts def. Omar Rzgoev	Cage Fury Fighting Championships 140; Philadelphia, Pennsylvania	March 14, 2025	
Roberts lost the title at CFFC 136 against Angel Alvarez, who was ineligible to claim the belt due to missing weight.
15	(United States) Will Starks def. Nikita Leshukov	Cage Fury Fighting Championships 150; Philadelphia, Pennsylvania	February 6, 2026	
16	(United States) Kevin Pease def. Will Starks	Cage Fury Fighting Championships 154; Lafayette Hill, Pennsylvania	May 29, 2026	
Pease vacated the title when he signed with the PFL.

=== CFFC Featherweight Championship ===
Weight limit: 145 lb (65.8 kg)

No.	Name	Event	Date	Defenses
1	(United States) Joey Gambino def. Eddie Fyvie	Cage Fury Fighting Championships 11; Atlantic City, New Jersey	October 22, 2011	1. def. Kenny Foster at CFFC 13 on February 4, 2012
Gambino vacated the title when he signed with the UFC.
2	(United States) Artur Rofi def. Lester Caslow	Cage Fury Fighting Championships 19; Atlantic City, New Jersey	February 2, 2013	
Rofi vacated the title when he signed with WSOF.
3	(United States) Scott Heckman def. Jeff Lentz	Cage Fury Fighting Championships 31; Atlantic City, New Jersey	February 8, 2014	
4	(Georgia (country)) Levan Makashvili def. Scott Heckman	Cage Fury Fighting Championships 35; Atlantic City, New Jersey	April 26, 2014	
5	(Brazil) Alexandre Bezerra def. Levan Makashvili	Cage Fury Fighting Championships 38; Atlantic City, New Jersey	August 9, 2014	
6	(Georgia (country)) Levan Makashvili (2) def. Alexandre Bezerra	Cage Fury Fighting Championships 44; Bethlehem, Pennsylvania	December 13, 2014	
Makashvili vacated the title when he signed with the UFC.
7	(United States) Jeff Lentz def. Jared Gordon	Cage Fury Fighting Championships 48; Atlantic City, New Jersey	May 9, 2015	
Lentz lost title at CFFC 57 against Bill Algeo, who was ineligible to claim the belt due to missing weight.
8	(United States) Jared Gordon def. Anthony Morrison	Cage Fury Fighting Championships 59; Philadelphia, Pennsylvania	July 9, 2016	1. def. Bill Algeo at CFFC 63 on February 18, 2017
Gordon vacated the title when he signed with the UFC.
9	(United States) Pat Sabatini def. John de Jesus	Cage Fury Fighting Championships 67; Philadelphia, Pennsylvania	September 16, 2017	1. def. Francisco Isata at CFFC 69 on December 16, 2017; 2. def. Da'mon Blackshear at CFFC 71 on December 14, 2018; 3. def. Fabricio Oliveira at CFFC 74 on May 17, 2019
10	(United States) James Gonzalez def. Pat Sabatini	Cage Fury Fighting Championships 81; Bensalem Township, Pennsylvania	February 1, 2020	
Gonzalez vacated the title when he moved down to compete in the bantamweight division.
11	(United States) Pat Sabatini (2) def. Jesse Stirn	Cage Fury Fighting Championships 91; Lancaster, Pennsylvania	December 18, 2020	
Sabatini vacated the title when he signed with the UFC.
12	(United States) Blake Bilder def. Frankie Buenafuente	Cage Fury Fighting Championships 104; Atlantic City, New Jersey	December 17, 2021	1. def. Regivaldo Carvalho at CFFC 107 on April 15, 2022
-	(United States) Jose Perez def. Frank Wells for the interim title	Cage Fury Fighting Championships 112; Philadelphia, Pennsylvania	August 26, 2022	
Bilder vacated the title when he signed with the UFC.
13	(United States) Jose Perez promoted to undisputed champion	–	–	1. def. Chris Vasil at CFFC 123 on September 1, 2023
Perez vacated the title when he signed with the PFL.
14	(United States) Anthony Dilemme def. Beau Samaniego	Cage Fury Fighting Championships 137; Philadelphia, Pennsylvania	October 18, 2024	
15	(United States) Ryan Cafaro def. Anthony Dilemme	Cage Fury Fighting Championships 142; Atlantic City, New Jersey	May 24, 2025	1. def. Justin Patton at CFFC 149 on December 20, 2025
Cafaro vacated the title when he signed with Rizin FF.

=== CFFC Bantamweight Championship ===
Weight limit: 135 lb (61.2 kg)

No.	Name	Event	Date	Defenses
1	(United States) Nick Cottone def. Matt McCabe	Cage Fury Fighting Championships 1 Atlantic City, New Jersey	June 30, 2006	
2	(United States) Clint Godfrey def. Nick Cottone	Cage Fury Fighting Championships 4 Atlantic City, New Jersey	April 13, 2007	
Godfrey vacated the title.
3	(United States) Aljamain Sterling def. Sean Santella	Cage Fury Fighting Championships 11; Atlantic City, New Jersey	October 22, 2011	1. def. Casey Johnson at CFFC 14 on April 14, 2012; 2. def. Sidemar Honorio at CFFC 16 on August 24, 2012; 3. def. Joel Roberts at CFFC 30 on November 2, 2013
Sterling vacated the title when he signed with the UFC.
4	(United States) Jimmie Rivera def. Anthony Durnell	Cage Fury Fighting Championships 43; Atlantic City, New Jersey	November 1, 2014	1. def. Carson Beebe at CFFC 48 on May 9, 2015
Rivera vacated the title when he signed with the UFC.
5	(United States) Nick Pace def. Ricky Bandejas	Cage Fury Fighting Championships 52; Atlantic City, New Jersey	October 31, 2015	1. def. Ahmet Kayretli at CFFC 63 on February 18, 2017
Pace vacated the title upon retirement from MMA in 2017.
-	(United States) Ricky Bandejas def. Giorgi Kudukhashvili for the interim title	Cage Fury Fighting Championships 66; Atlantic City, New Jersey	August 5, 2017	1. def. Nick Mamalis at CFFC 69 on December 16, 2017
Bandejas vacated the title when he signed with Bellator MMA.
6	(Russia) Alexander Keshtov def. Andre Bernardo	Cage Fury Fighting Championships 71; Atlantic City, New Jersey	December 14, 2018	
Keshtov lost the title at CFFC 81 against Herbeth Sousa, who was ineligible to claim the belt due to missing weight.
7	(United States) Jared Scoggins def. Thomas Vasquez	Cage Fury Fighting Championships 84; Tunica, Mississippi	September 17, 2020	
Scoggins vacated the title when he signed with Bellator MMA.
8	(Uzbekistan) Saidyokub Kakhramonov def. Tycen Lynn	Cage Fury Fighting Championships 92; Philadelphia, Pennsylvania	March 11, 2021	
Kakhramonov vacated the title when he signed with the UFC.
9	(United States) Da'Mon Blackshear def. DeAndre Anderson	Cage Fury Fighting Championships 103; Tunica, Mississippi	November 19, 2021	1. def. Josh Smith at CFFC 108 on May 14, 2022
Blackshear vacated the title when he signed with the UFC.
10	(Albania) Vilson Ndregjoni def. Ashiek Ajim	Cage Fury Fighting Championships 118; Philadelphia, Pennsylvania	April 1, 2023	
Ndregjoni vacated the title at the scale upon missing weight for first title defense at CFFC 120.
11	(United States) Joey Ruquet def. Khusein Shaikhaev	Cage Fury Fighting Championships 135; Tampa, Florida	September 21, 2024	
Ruquet vacated the title to pursue additional opportunities outside of MMA.
12	(Cuba) Sean Mora def. Mark Grey	Cage Fury Fighting Championships 144; Tampa, Florida	July 18, 2025	
-	(United States) Lucas Seibert def. Sebastian Ruiz for the interim title	Cage Fury Fighting Championships 153; Philadelphia, Pennsylvania	April 17, 2026	
Mora vacated the title when he signed with the PFL.

=== CFFC Flyweight Championship ===
Weight limit: 125 lb (56.7 kg)

No.	Name	Event	Date	Defenses
1	(United States) Sean Santella def. Bryan Lashomb	Cage Fury Fighting Championships 13; Atlantic City, New Jersey	February 4, 2012	1. def. Tuan Pham at CFFC 14 on April 14, 2012; 2. def. Evan Velez at CFFC 16 on August 24, 2012; 3. def. Anthony Figueroa at CFFC 19 on February 2, 2013; 4. def. Dave Morgan at CFFC 24 on August 24, 2012
2	(Australia) Nick Honstein def. Sean Santella	Cage Fury Fighting Championships 34; Morristown, New Jersey	April 19, 2014	1. def. Darren Mima at CFFC 40 on August 23, 2014
Honstein vacated the title.
3	(Brazil) Sidemar Honorio def. Darren Mima	Cage Fury Fighting Championships 44; Bethlehem, Pennsylvania	December 13, 2014	1. def. Lincoln de Sá at CFFC 49 on June 6, 2015
4	(United States) Louis Gaudinot def. Sidemar Honorio	Cage Fury Fighting Championships 57; Philadelphia, Pennsylvania	March 19, 2016	
-	(United States) Sean Santella def. Matt Lozano for the interim title	Cage Fury Fighting Championships 62; Philadelphia, Pennsylvania	December 17, 2016	
Gaudinot vacated the title upon retirement from MMA.
5	(United States) Sean Santella (2) promoted to undisputed champion	–	–	1. def. Kevin Gray at CFFC 69 on December 16, 2017
Santella vacated the title when he signed with Brave CF.
6	(United States) Sean Santella (3) def. Andre Barquero	Cage Fury Fighting Championships 76; Bensalem Township, Pennsylvania	June 14, 2019	1. def. Blaine Shutt at CFFC 78 on September 21, 2019
Santella vacated the title to pursue additional opportunities.
7	(United States) Santo Curatolo def. James Mancini	Cage Fury Fighting Championships 82; Philadelphia, Pennsylvania	August 12, 2020	
8	(United States) Alberto Trujillo def. Santo Curatolo	Cage Fury Fighting Championships 87; Philadelphia, Pennsylvania	October 30, 2020	
9	(United States) Phumi Nkuta def. Alberto Trujillo	Cage Fury Fighting Championships 92; Philadelphia, Pennsylvania	March 11, 2021	1. def. Miguel Junior Diaz at CFFC 101 on October 2, 2021; 2. def. Jason Eastman at CFFC 104 on December 17, 2021
-	(United States) Lloyd McKinney def. Santo Curatolo for the interim title	Cage Fury Fighting Championships 110; Tampa, Florida	July 14, 2022	
McKinney vacated the interim title upon retirement from MMA.
Nkuta vacated the title upon retirement from MMA.
10	(Japan) Makoto Takahashi def. Diego Paiva	Cage Fury Fighting Championships 114; Tampa, Florida	November 10, 2022	
Takahashi vacated the title when he signed with Rizin FF.
11	(Russia) Badmatsyren Dorzhiev def. Shamel Findley	Cage Fury Fighting Championships 122; Tampa, Florida	July 20, 2023	
Dorzhiev lost the title at CFFC 130 against Israel Galvan, who was ineligible to claim the belt due to missing weight.
12	(Indonesia) Bilal Hasan def. Jose Leon	Cage Fury Fighting Championships 136; New Town, North Dakota	September 27, 2024	1. def. Brian Hauser at CFFC 139 on February 1, 2025; 2. def. Jason Eastman at CFFC 143 on June 6, 2025; 3. def. Renaldy Manse at CFFC 149 on December, 2025
-	(Israel) Moshe Aladi def. Ben Coyle for the interim title	Cage Fury Fighting Championships 154; Lafayette Hill, Pennsylvania	May 29, 2026	
Hasan vacated the title when he signed with the UFC.
13	(Israel) Moshe Aladi promoted to undisputed champion	Cage Fury Fighting Championships 159; Philadelphia, Pennsylvania	August 14, 2026	
-	(United States) Xhelal "Jerry" Lleshi def. Erik Calvert for the interim title	Cage Fury Fighting Championships 161; Rockford, Illinois	September 11, 2026	

=== CFFC Women's Bantamweight Championship ===
Weight limit: 135 lb (61.2 kg)

No.	Name	Event	Date	Defenses
1	(United States) Katlyn Chookagian def. Stephanie Bragayrac	Cage Fury Fighting Championships 57; Philadelphia, Pennsylvania	March 19, 2016	
Chookagian vacated the title when she signed with the UFC.
2	(United States) Auttumn Norton def. Emily Martins	Cage Fury Fighting Championships 132; Philadelphia, Pennsylvania	June 14, 2024	
Norton vacated the title at the scale upon missing weight for first title defense at CFFC 144.
3	(Brazil) Emily Martins def. Auttumn Norton	Cage Fury Fighting Championships 144; Tampa, Florida	July 18, 2025	1. def. Alexa Conners at CFFC 149 on December 20, 2025

=== CFFC Women's Flyweight Championship ===
Weight limit: 125 lb (56.7 kg)

No.	Name	Event	Date	Defenses
1	(United States) Katlyn Chookagian def. Isabelly Varela	Cage Fury Fighting Championships 55; Atlantic City, New Jersey	January 9, 2016	
Chookagian vacated the title when she signed with the UFC.
2	(United States) Fatima Kline def. Sara Cova	Cage Fury Fighting Championships 127; Tunica, Mississippi	November 3, 2023	
Kline vacated the title when she signed with the UFC.

=== CFFC Women's Strawweight Championship ===
Weight limit: 115 lb (52.2 kg)

No.	Name	Event	Date	Defenses
1	(United States) Miranda Granger def. Heloisa Azevedo	Cage Fury Fighting Championships 75; Coachella, California	May 25, 2019	
Granger vacated the title when she signed with the UFC.
2	(United States) Elise Reed def. Jasmine Jasudavicius	Cage Fury Fighting Championships 82; Philadelphia, Pennsylvania	August 13, 2020	1. def. Jillian DeCoursey at CFFC 91 on December 18, 2020; 2. def. Hilarie Rose at CFFC 97 on May 29, 2021
Reed vacated the title when she signed with the UFC.
3	(United States) Fatima Kline def. Andressa Romero	Cage Fury Fighting Championships 129; Philadelphia, Pennsylvania	February 9, 2024	
Kline vacated the title when she signed with the UFC.
4	(Japan) Arisa Matsuda def. Ayan Tursyn	Cage Fury Fighting Championships 150; Philadelphia, Pennsylvania	February 6, 2026	

== Cage Fury Fighting Championships NextGen Title History ==
=== CFFC NextGen Heavyweight Title History ===
No.	Name	Event	Date	Defenses
1	(United States) Ian Allston def. Dwight Maters	Cage Fury Fighting Championships 105; Philadelphia, Pennsylvania	January 29, 2022	
Allston vacated the title when he turned pro in 2022.

=== CFFC NextGen Light Heavyweight Title History ===
No.	Name	Event	Date	Defenses
1	(United States) Luke Fernandez def. Cody Lewis	Cage Fury Fighting Championships 102; Philadelphia, Pennsylvania	October 30, 2021	1. def. Dymere Rappa at CFFC 108 on May 14, 2022; 2. def. Reeves Davis Jr. at CFFC 112 on August 26, 2022
Fernandez vacated the title when he turned pro in 2023.

=== CFFC NextGen 197-pound (NJSACB Super Cruiserweight) Title History ===
No.	Name	Event	Date	Defenses
1	(United States) Joey Milano def. Jesse Pastore	CFFC 157; Atlantic City, New Jersey	July 17, 2026	

=== CFFC NextGen 190-pound (NJSACB Cruiserweight) Title History ===
No.	Name	Event	Date	Defenses
1	(United States) Joey Milano def. Edwin Romero	CFFC NextGen 2 Atlantic City, New Jersey	October 3, 2025	1. def. Damien Blotzke at CFFC 149 on December, 2025

=== CFFC NextGen Middleweight Title History ===
No.	Name	Event	Date	Defenses
1	(United States) Matt Roman def. Steven Covington	Cage Fury Fighting Championships 56; Philadelphia, Pennsylvania	February 27, 2016	
Roman vacated the title when he retired from MMA.
2	(United States) Miles Lee def. Sedriques Dumas	Cage Fury Fighting Championships 81; Bensalem, Pennsylvania	February 1, 2020	
Lee vacated the title when he turned pro in 2021.
3	(United States) Nick Galanti def. Payton Phillips	Cage Fury Fighting Championships 113; Bensalem, Pennsylvania	October 8, 2022	
4	(United States) M, A, Yah II def. Nick Galanti	Cage Fury Fighting Championships 118; Philadelphia, Pennsylvania	April 1, 2023	
Yah II vacated the title when he turned pro in 2023.
5	(United States) Chris Hayes def. David Harrison	Cage Fury Fighting Championships 137; Philadelphia, Pennsylvania	October 18, 2024	

=== CFFC NextGen 182-pound (NJSACB Super Light Heavyweight) Title History ===
No.	Name	Event	Date	Defenses
1	(United States) Cade Berardelli def. Max Oltmanns	CFFC NextGen 3 Atlantic City, New Jersey	May 2, 2026	1. def. JJ MacDonald at CFFC NextGen 24 on August 22, 2026

=== CFFC NextGen 175-pound (NJSACB Light Heavyweight) Title History ===
No.	Name	Event	Date	Defenses
1	(United States) James Lledo def. Joe Teguia	CFFC NextGen 1 Atlantic City, New Jersey	July 26, 2025	1. def. Sean Clabough at CFFC NextGen 2 on October 3, 2025
–	(Georgia (country)) Giorgi Barliani def. Jack McCaffrey for the interim title	CFFC NextGen 3 Atlantic City, New Jersey	May 2, 2026	

=== CFFC NextGen Welterweight Title History ===
No.	Name	Event	Date	Defenses
1	(United States) Morquez Forest def. Theoren Thorn	Cage Fury Fighting Championships 110; Tampa, Florida	July 14, 2022	
Forest vacated the title when he turned pro in 2023.
2	(United States) James Lledo def. Trey Frazier	Cage Fury Fighting Championships 110; Philadelphia, Pennsylvania	November 7, 2025	

=== CFFC NextGen 168-pound (NJSACB Super Middleweight) Title History ===
No.	Name	Event	Date	Defenses
1	(United States) Kayne Caplinger def. James Lledo	CFFC 149; Atlantic City, New Jersey	December 20, 2025	
Caplinger was stripped of the title when he was unable to defend it.
2	(United States) Jack Sheehan def. Giorgi Barliani	CFFC NextGen 4 Philadelphia, Pennsylvania	August 22, 2026	

=== CFFC NextGen Lightweight Title History ===
No.	Name	Event	Date	Defenses
1	(United States) Jose Rodriguez def. Chase Moelle	Cage Fury Fighting Championships 132; Philadelphia, Pennsylvania	June 14, 2024	
Rodriguez vacated the title when he turned pro in 2024.

=== CFFC NextGen 147-pound (NJSACB Welterweight) Title History ===
No.	Name	Event	Date	Defenses
1	(Georgia (country)) Giorgi Kantroshvili def. Liam O'Toole	CFFC NextGen 1 Atlantic City, New Jersey	July 26, 2025	1. def. Devon Coates at CFFC NextGen 2 on October 3, 2025; 2. def. Trig Tennant at CFFC NextGen 3 on May 2, 2026

=== CFFC NextGen Featherweight Title History ===
No.	Name	Event	Date	Defenses
1	(United States) BJ Young def. Robbie De La Rionda	Cage Fury Fighting Championships 56; Philadelphia, Pennsylvania	February 27, 2016	
Young vacated the title when he turned pro in 2017.
2	(United States) Mark Grey def. Justin Carter	Cage Fury Fighting Championships 101; Bensalem, Pennsylvania	October 2, 2021	
Grey vacated the title when he turned pro in 2022.
3	(United States) Blake Torchon def. Phoenix Ibe	Cage Fury Fighting Championships 135; Tampa, Florida	September 21, 2024	

=== CFFC NextGen Bantamweight Title History ===
No.	Name	Event	Date	Defenses
1	(United States) Riley Palmer def. Argenis Castro	Cage Fury Fighting Championships 106; Tampa, Florida	August 26, 2022	1. def. Steve Phelan at CFFC 112 on August 26, 2022
Palmer vacated the title when he turned pro in 2023.
2	(United States) Jesse Dejong def. Dontay Friga	Cage Fury Fighting Championships 144; Tampa, Florida	July 18, 2025	

=== CFFC NextGen Flyweight Title History ===
No.	Name	Event	Date	Defenses
1	(United States) Xhelal "Jerry" Lleshi def. Matthew Heller	Cage Fury Fighting Championships 112; Philadelphia, Pennsylvania	August 26, 2022	
Lleshi vacated the title when he turned pro in 2022.
2	(United States) Nick Gebhard def. Tony Lichtenberger	Cage Fury Fighting Championships 123; Bensalem, Pennsylvania	September 1, 2023	
Gebhard vacated the title when he turned pro in 2024.
3	(United States) Michael McCaffrey def. Jason Gomez	Cage Fury Fighting Championships 139; Philadelphia, Pennsylvania	February 1, 2025	
McCaffrey vacated the title when he turned pro in 2025.

=== CFFC NextGen Women's Bantamweight Title History ===
No.	Name	Event	Date	Defenses
1	(United States) Kayana La Torre def. Taylor Drees	Cage Fury Fighting Championships 150; Philadelphia, Pennsylvania	February 6, 2026	

=== CFFC NextGen Women's Strawweight Title History ===
No.	Name	Event	Date	Defenses
1	(United States) Taylor Samarco def. Faith Nichols	Cage Fury Fighting Championships 123; Bensalem, Pennsylvania	September 1, 2023	
2	(United States) Leilani Hodgens def. Taylor Samarco	Cage Fury Fighting Championships 129; Philadelphia, Pennsylvania	February 9, 2024	
Hodgens vacated the title when she turned pro in 2024.

== List of events ==
No.	Event name	Date	Venue	Location
163	CFFC 163	December 19, 2026	Hard Rock Live at Etess Arena	(United States) Atlantic City, New Jersey
161	CFFC 162	December 4, 2026	Hard Rock Hotel & Casino Bristol	(United States) Bristol, Virginia
161	CFFC 161: Lleshi vs. Calvert	September 11, 2026	Hard Rock Casino Rockford	(United States) Rockford, Illinois
160	CFFC 160: Kostyuchenko vs. Veal	September 4, 2026	Hard Rock Hotel & Casino Bristol	(United States) Bristol, Virginia
159	CFFC 159: Bobe vs. Isah	August 14, 2026	2300 Arena	(United States) Philadelphia, Pennsylvania
158	CFFC 158: Norton vs. Ribeiro	August 7, 2026	Hard Rock Casino Cincinnati	(United States) Cincinnati, Ohio
157	CFFC 157: Bobe vs. Malakanov	July 17, 2026	Hard Rock Live at Etess Arena	(United States) Atlantic City, New Jersey
156	CFFC 156: Stanford vs. Lewis	June 26, 2026	Hard Rock Casino Rockford	(United States) Rockford, Illinois
155	CFFC 155: Cunningham vs. Russell	June 19, 2026	2300 Arena	(United States) Philadelphia, Pennsylvania
154	CFFC 154: The Thrill on the Hill	May 29, 2026	Union League Liberty Hill	(United States) Lafayette Hill, Pennsylvania
153	CFFC 153: Hasan vs. Coyle	April 17, 2026	2300 Arena	(United States) Philadelphia, Pennsylvania
152	CFFC 152: Galanti vs. Clayton	March 27, 2026	Hard Rock Live at Etess Arena	(United States) Atlantic City, New Jersey
151	CFFC 151: Gonzales vs. Nchukwi	March 13, 2026	Seminole Hard Rock Hotel & Casino Tampa	(United States) Tampa, Florida
150	CFFC 150: Zhumagul vs. Morrison	February 6, 2026	2300 Arena	(United States) Philadelphia, Pennsylvania
149	CFFC 149: Cafaro vs. Patton	December 20, 2025	Hard Rock Live at Etess Arena	(United States) Atlantic City, New Jersey
148	CFFC 148: Guarascio vs. Gonzales	November 7, 2025	2300 Arena	(United States) Philadelphia, Pennsylvania
147	CFFC 147: Pease vs. Pauley	October 10, 2025	Florida State Fairgrounds	(United States) Tampa, Florida
146	CFFC 146: Roberts vs. Alvarez	September 26, 2025	4 Bears Casino & Lodge	(United States) New Town, North Dakota
145	CFFC 145: Lewis vs. Orozco	August 30, 2025	Hard Rock Live at Etess Arena	(United States) Atlantic City, New Jersey
144	CFFC 144: Norton vs. Martins 2	July 18, 2025	Florida State Fairgrounds	(United States) Tampa, Florida
143	CFFC 143: Hasan vs. Eastman	June 6, 2025	4 Bears Casino & Lodge	(United States) New Town, North Dakota
142	CFFC 142: Fernandez vs. Edwards	May 24, 2025	Hard Rock Live at Etess Arena	(United States) Atlantic City, New Jersey
141	CFFC 141: Schoenfelder vs. Guarascio	April 19, 2025	Florida State Fairgrounds	(United States) Tampa, Florida
140	CFFC 140: Rzgoev vs. Roberts	March 14, 2025	2300 Arena	(United States) Philadelphia, Pennsylvania
139	CFFC 139: Hasan vs. Hauser	February 1, 2025	2300 Arena	(United States) Philadelphia, Pennsylvania
138	CFFC 138: Fernandez vs. Ellis	December 13, 2024	Hard Rock Live at Etess Arena	(United States) Atlantic City, New Jersey
137	CFFC 137: Dilemme vs. Samaniego	October 18, 2024	2300 Arena	(United States) Philadelphia, Pennsylvania
136	CFFC 136: Forest vs. Richards	September 27, 2024	4 Bears Casino & Lodge	(United States) New Town, North Dakota
135	CFFC 135: Ruquet vs. Shaikhaev	September 21, 2024	Florida State Fairgrounds	(United States) Tampa, Florida
134	CFFC 134: Daukaus vs. Nchukwi	August 16, 2024	Hard Rock Live at Etess Arena	(United States) Atlantic City, New Jersey
133	CFFC 133: Watley vs. Forest	July 26, 2024	Florida State Fairgrounds	(United States) Tampa, Florida
132	CFFC 132: Daukaus vs. Patershuk	June 14, 2024	2300 Arena	(United States) Philadelphia, Pennsylvania
131	CFFC 131: Forest vs Varricchio	April 12, 2024	Hard Rock Live at Etess Arena	(United States) Atlantic City, New Jersey
130	CFFC 130: Dorzhiev vs. Galvan	March 8, 2024	Florida State Fairgrounds	(United States) Tampa, Florida
129	CFFC 129: Kline vs. Romero	February 9, 2024	2300 Arena	(United States) Philadelphia, Pennsylvania
128	CFFC 128: Watley vs. Gjetja	December 15, 2023	Hard Rock Live at Etess Arena	(United States) Atlantic City, New Jersey
127	CFFC 127: Kline vs. Cova	November 3, 2023	Horseshoe Tunica	(United States) Tunica, Mississippi
126	CFFC 126: Alvidrez vs. Rentz	October 13, 2023	Florida State Fairgrounds	(United States) Tampa, Florida
125	CFFC 125: Nakanelua vs. Echeverria	September 15, 2023	4 Bears Casino & Lodge	(United States) New Town, North Dakota
124	CFFC 124: Ellis vs. Daukaus	September 2, 2023	Parx Casino	(United States) Bensalem Township, Pennsylvania
123	CFFC 123: Perez vs. Vasil	September 1, 2023	Parx Casino	(United States) Bensalem Township, Pennsylvania
122	CFFC 122: Gunnison vs. Watley	July 20, 2023	Seminole Hard Rock Hotel & Casino Tampa	(United States) Tampa, Florida
121	CFFC 121: Perez vs. Vasil	July 14, 2023	Horseshoe Tunica	(United States) Tunica, Mississippi
120	CFFC 120: Ndregjoni vs. Araujo	June 16, 2023	Hard Rock Live at Etess Arena	(United States) Atlantic City, New Jersey
119	CFFC 119: Beard vs. Ellis	April 20, 2023	Seminole Hard Rock Hotel & Casino Tampa	(United States) Tampa, Florida
118	CFFC 118: Forest vs. Radtke	April 1, 2023	2300 Arena	(United States) Philadelphia, Pennsylvania
117	CFFC 117: Kamchybekov vs. Gunnison	March 31, 2023	2300 Arena	(United States) Philadelphia, Pennsylvania
116	CFFC 116: Torres vs. Mathison	December 16, 2022	Hard Rock Live at Etess Arena	(United States) Atlantic City, New Jersey
115	CFFC 115: Forest vs. Lubberts	November 18, 2022	Horseshoe Tunica	(United States) Tunica, Mississippi
114	CFFC 114: Smith vs. St. Louis	November 10, 2022	Seminole Hard Rock Hotel & Casino Tampa	(United States) Tampa, Florida
113	CFFC 113: Sears vs. Velasco	October 8, 2022	Parx Casino	(United States) Bensalem Township, Pennsylvania
112	CFFC 112: Perez vs. Wells	August 26, 2022	2300 Arena	(United States) Philadelphia, Pennsylvania
111	CFFC 111: Lee vs. Beard	July 29, 2022	Horseshoe Tunica	(United States) Tunica, Mississippi
110	CFFC 110: Curatolo vs. McKinney	July 14, 2022	Seminole Hard Rock Hotel & Casino Tampa	(United States) Tampa, Florida
109	CFFC 109: Curatolo vs. Paiva	May 27, 2022	2300 Arena	(United States) Philadelphia, Pennsylvania
108	CFFC 108: Blackshear vs. Smith	May 14, 2022	Parx Casino	(United States) Bensalem Township, Pennsylvania
107	CFFC 107: Bilder vs. Carvalho	April 15, 2022	Hard Rock Live at Etess Arena	(United States) Atlantic City, New Jersey
106	CFFC 106: Smith vs. Artis	March 17, 2022	Seminole Hard Rock Hotel & Casino Tampa	(United States) Tampa, Florida
105	CFFC 105: Jeffrey vs. Harris	January 29, 2022	2300 Arena	(United States) Philadelphia, Pennsylvania
104	CFFC 104: Torres vs. Bilder	December 17, 2021	Hard Rock Live at Etess Arena	(United States) Atlantic City, New Jersey
103	CFFC 103: Anderson vs. Blackshear	November 19, 2021	Horseshoe Tunica	(United States) Tunica, Mississippi
102	CFFC 102: Burrell vs. Stewart	October 30, 2021	2300 Arena	(United States) Philadelphia, Pennsylvania
101	CFFC 101: Nkuta vs. Diaz	October 2, 2021	Parx Casino	(United States) Bensalem Township, Pennsylvania
100	CFFC 100: Kamchybekov vs. Smith	September 16, 2021	Seminole Hard Rock Hotel & Casino Tampa	(United States) Tampa, Florida
99	CFFC 99: Hodge vs. Rodriguez	August 14, 2021	Fitz Casino & Hotel	(United States) Tunica, Mississippi
98	CFFC 98: Cutts vs. Lainesse	July 3, 2021	2300 Arena	(United States) Philadelphia, Pennsylvania
97	CFFC 97: Reed vs. Rose	May 29, 2021	2300 Arena	(United States) Philadelphia, Pennsylvania
96	CFFC 96: Jones vs. Cleveland	May 28, 2021	2300 Arena	(United States) Philadelphia, Pennsylvania
95	CFFC 95: Kamchybekov vs. Smith	April 2, 2021	2300 Arena	(United States) Philadelphia, Pennsylvania
94	CFFC 94: Hafez vs. Cutts	April 1, 2021	2300 Arena	(United States) Philadelphia, Pennsylvania
93	CFFC 93: Huckbody vs. Jeffery	March 12, 2021	2300 Arena	(United States) Philadelphia, Pennsylvania
92	CFFC 92: Trujillo vs. Nkuta	March 11, 2021	2300 Arena	(United States) Philadelphia, Pennsylvania
91	CFFC 91: Sabatini vs. Stirn	December 18, 2020	Lancaster County Convention Center	(United States) Lancaster, Pennsylvania
90	CFFC 90: Huckbody vs. Phillips	December 17, 2020	Lancaster County Convention Center	(United States) Lancaster, Pennsylvania
89	CFFC 89: Savoie vs. Hafez	November 19, 2020	2300 Arena	(United States) Philadelphia, Pennsylvania
88	CFFC 88: Lynn vs. Caracappa	November 18, 2020	2300 Arena	(United States) Philadelphia, Pennsylvania
87	CFFC 87: Curatolo vs. Trujillo	October 30, 2020	2300 Arena	(United States) Philadelphia, Pennsylvania
86	CFFC 86: Gonzalez vs. Mowles	October 29, 2020	2300 Arena	(United States) Philadelphia, Pennsylvania
85	CFFC 85: Hill vs. Lee	September 18, 2020	Horseshoe Casino Tunica	(United States) Tunica, Mississippi
84	CFFC 84: Scoggins vs. Vasquez	September 17, 2020	Horseshoe Casino Tunica	(United States) Tunica, Mississippi
83	CFFC 83: Jasudavicius vs. Reed	August 13, 2020	2300 Arena	(United States) Philadelphia, Pennsylvania
82	CFFC 82: Curatolo vs. Mancini	August 12, 2020	2300 Arena	(United States) Philadelphia, Pennsylvania
81	CFFC 81: Three Title Fights	February 1, 2020	Parx Casino	(United States) Bensalem Township, Pennsylvania
80	CFFC 80: Rhodes vs. Wali	November 22, 2019	Joint Base Langley-Eustis	(United States) Newport News, Virginia
79	CFFC 79: Motta vs. Gonzalez	November 16, 2019	Hard Rock Live at Etess Arena	(United States) Atlantic City, New Jersey
78	CFFC 78: Santella vs. Shutt	September 21, 2019	Parx Casino	(United States) Bensalem Township, Pennsylvania
77	CFFC 77: Motta vs. Balmaceda	August 16, 2019	Hard Rock Live at Etess Arena	(United States) Atlantic City, New Jersey
76	CFFC 76: Santella vs. Barquero	June 14, 2019	Parx Casino	(United States) Bensalem Township, Pennsylvania
75	CFFC 75: Granger vs. Azevedo	May 25, 2019	Spotlight 29 Casino	(United States) Coachella, California
74	CFFC 74: Sabatini vs. Oliveira	April 17, 2019	Hard Rock Live at Etess Arena	(United States) Atlantic City, New Jersey
73	CFFC 73: Anyanwu vs. Daukaus	March 4, 2019	Parx Casino	(United States) Bensalem Township, Pennsylvania
72	CFFC 72: Brady vs. Abdul-Hakim	February 16, 2019	Hard Rock Live at Etess Arena	(United States) Atlantic City, New Jersey
71	CFFC 71: Norris vs. Balmaceda	December 14, 2018	Borgata Hotel & Casino	(United States) Atlantic City, New Jersey
70	CFFC 70: Balmaceda vs. Stewart	March 24, 2018	Borgata Hotel & Casino	(United States) Atlantic City, New Jersey
69	CFFC 69: Four World Titles	December 16, 2017	Borgata Hotel & Casino	(United States) Atlantic City, New Jersey
68	CFFC 68: Brady vs. Jones	October 21, 2017	Borgata Hotel & Casino	(United States) Atlantic City, New Jersey
67	CFFC 67: Sabatini vs. De Jesus	September 16, 2017	2300 Arena	(United States) Philadelphia, Pennsylvania
66	CFFC 66: Webb vs. Wilson	August 5, 2017	Borgata Hotel & Casino	(United States) Atlantic City, New Jersey
65	CFFC 65: Three World Titles	May 20, 2017	2300 Arena	(United States) Philadelphia, Pennsylvania
64	CFFC 64: San Diego	March 26, 2017	Observatory North Park	(United States) San Diego, California
63	CFFC 63: Anyanwu vs. Teed	February 18, 2017	Borgata Hotel & Casino	(United States) Atlantic City, New Jersey
62	CFFC 62: Santella vs. Lozano	December 17, 2016	2300 Arena	(United States) Philadelphia, Pennsylvania
61	CFFC 61: Anyanwu vs. Pinto	October 29, 2016	Borgata Hotel & Casino	(United States) Atlantic City, New Jersey
60	CFFC 60: Webb vs. Steele	August 6, 2016	Borgata Hotel & Casino	(United States) Atlantic City, New Jersey
59	CFFC 59: Gordon vs. Morrison	July 9, 2016	2300 Arena	(United States) Philadelphia, Pennsylvania
58	CFFC 58: Anyanwu vs. Cruz III	May 21, 2016	Borgata Hotel & Casino	(United States) Atlantic City, New Jersey
57	CFFC 57: Honorio vs. Gaudinot	March 19, 2016	2300 Arena	(United States) Philadelphia, Pennsylvania
56	CFFC 56: Wells vs. Walo	February 27, 2016	2300 Arena	(United States) Philadelphia, Pennsylvania
55	CFFC 55: Lentz vs. Algeo	January 9, 2016	Borgata Hotel & Casino	(United States) Atlantic City, New Jersey
54	CFFC 54: Next Generation	January 8, 2016	Borgata Hotel & Casino	(United States) Atlantic City, New Jersey
53	CFFC 53: Anyanwu vs. Spohn	December 4, 2015	2300 Arena	(United States) Philadelphia, Pennsylvania
52	CFFC 52: Horcher vs. Regman	October 31, 2015	Borgata Hotel & Casino	(United States) Atlantic City, New Jersey
51	CFFC 51: Ledesma vs. Gaudinot	September 12, 2015	Sands Casino Resort Bethlehem	(United States) Bethlehem, Pennsylvania
50	CFFC 50: Smith vs. Williams II	July 18, 2015	Borgata Hotel & Casino	(United States) Atlantic City, New Jersey
49	CFFC 49: Honorio vs. Oliveira	June 6, 2015	Sands Casino Resort Bethlehem	(United States) Bethlehem, Pennsylvania
48	CFFC 48: Good vs. Burrell	May 9, 2015	Borgata Hotel & Casino	(United States) Atlantic City, New Jersey
47	CFFC 47: Webb vs. Harshbarger	March 7, 2015	Sands Casino Resort Bethlehem	(United States) Bethlehem, Pennsylvania
46	CFFC 46: Williams vs. Smith	February 28, 2015	Harrah's Philadelphia	(United States) Chester, Pennsylvania
45	CFFC 45: Horcher vs. Stiner	February 7, 2015	Borgata Hotel & Casino	(United States) Atlantic City, New Jersey
44	CFFC 44: Bezerra vs. Makashvili	December 13, 2014	Sands Casino Resort Bethlehem	(United States) Bethlehem, Pennsylvania
43	CFFC 43: Good vs. Webb	November 1, 2014	Borgata Hotel & Casino	(United States) Atlantic City, New Jersey
42	CFFC 42 (XFE 46): Burgos vs. Algeo	October 25, 2014	Harrah's Philadelphia	(United States) Chester, Pennsylvania
41	CFFC 41: Holt vs. Cruz	October 11, 2014	Sands Casino Resort Bethlehem	(United States) Bethlehem, Pennsylvania
40	CFFC 40: Horcher vs. Ricci	August 23, 2014	Valley Forge Casino Resort	(United States) King of Prussia, Pennsylvania
39	CFFC 39: Heckman vs. Gerhart	August 16, 2014	Sands Casino Resort Bethlehem	(United States) Bethlehem, Pennsylvania
38	CFFC 38: Felder vs. Johnson	August 9, 2014	Borgata Hotel & Casino	(United States) Atlantic City, New Jersey
37	CFFC 37: Anyanwu vs. Bell	June 28, 2014	2300 Arena	(United States) Philadelphia, Pennsylvania
36	CFFC 36: Secor vs. Good	June 21, 2014	Mennen Sports Arena	(United States) Morristown, New Jersey
35	CFFC 35: Heckman vs. Makashvili	April 26, 2014	Borgata Hotel & Casino	(United States) Atlantic City, New Jersey
34	CFFC 34: Santella vs. Honstein	April 19, 2014	Mennen Sports Arena	(United States) Morristown, New Jersey
33	CFFC 33: Felder vs. Stevens	March 22, 2014	2300 Arena	(United States) Philadelphia, Pennsylvania
32	CFFC 32: Stripling vs. Anyanwu	February 22, 2014	Valley Forge Casino Resort	(United States) King of Prussia, Pennsylvania
31	CFFC 31: Heckman vs. Lentz	February 8, 2014	Borgata Hotel & Casino	(United States) Atlantic City, New Jersey
30	CFFC 30: Sterling vs. Roberts	November 2, 2013	Valley Forge Casino Resort	(United States) King of Prussia, Pennsylvania
29	CFFC 29: Smith vs. Kelleher	November 1, 2013	Valley Forge Casino Resort	(United States) King of Prussia, Pennsylvania
28	CFFC 28: Brenneman vs. Baker	October 26, 2013	Borgata Hotel & Casino	(United States) Atlantic City, New Jersey
27	CFFC 27: Heckman vs. Kelleher	September 21, 2013	Valley Forge Casino Resort	(United States) King of Prussia, Pennsylvania
26	CFFC 26: Sullivan vs. Martinez	August 17, 2013	Borgata Hotel & Casino	(United States) Atlantic City, New Jersey
25	CFFC 25: Williams vs. Faunce	June 22, 2013	Valley Forge Casino Resort	(United States) King of Prussia, Pennsylvania
24	CFFC 24: Sullivan vs. Becker	May 11, 2013	Borgata Hotel & Casino	(United States) Atlantic City, New Jersey
23	CFFC 23: La Nsang vs. Baker	April 13, 2013	Valley Forge Casino Resort	(United States) King of Prussia, Pennsylvania
22	CFFC 22: Wynn vs. Velez	March 16, 2013	Dover Downs	(United States) Dover, Delaware
21	CFFC 21: Lashomb vs. Hickey	February 16, 2013	Richmond Raceway Complex	(United States) Richmond, Virginia
20	CFFC 20: Heckman vs. Martinez	February 8, 2013	Valley Forge Convention Center	(United States) King of Prussia, Pennsylvania
19	CFFC 19: Sullivan vs. Lane	February 2, 2013	Borgata Hotel & Casino	(United States) Atlantic City, New Jersey
18	CFFC 18: Wade vs. McCray	October 27, 2012	Richmond Raceway Complex	(United States) Richmond, Virginia
17	CFFC 17: Nsang vs. Louck	October 13, 2012	Dover Downs	(United States) Dover, Delaware
16	CFFC 16: Williams vs. Jacoby	August 24, 2012	Borgata Hotel & Casino	(United States) Atlantic City, New Jersey
15	CFFC 15: Williams vs. Rumsey	June 30, 2012	Resorts Casino Hotel	(United States) Atlantic City, New Jersey
14	CFFC 14: No Mercy	April 14, 2012	Borgata Hotel & Casino	(United States) Atlantic City, New Jersey
13	CFFC 13: Gambino vs. Foster	February 4, 2012	Resorts Casino Hotel	(United States) Atlantic City, New Jersey
12	CFFC 12: Pollard vs. Soto	December 10, 2011	Resorts Casino Hotel	(United States) Atlantic City, New Jersey
11	CFFC 11: Danger Zone!	October 22, 2011	Resorts Casino Hotel	(United States) Atlantic City, New Jersey
10	CFFC 10: Black Eye	July 23, 2011	Resorts Casino Hotel	(United States) Atlantic City, New Jersey
9	CFFC 9: Beach Brawl	June 10, 2011	Resorts Casino Hotel	(United States) Atlantic City, New Jersey
8	CFFC 8: Seek and Destroy	May 20, 2011	Resorts Casino Hotel	(United States) Atlantic City, New Jersey
7	CFFC 7: No Mercy	April 16, 2011	Resorts Casino Hotel	(United States) Atlantic City, New Jersey
6	CFFC 6: The Return	February 5, 2011	Resorts Casino Hotel	(United States) Atlantic City, New Jersey
5	CFFC 5: Two Worlds, One Cage	June 23, 2007	Boardwalk Hall	(United States) Atlantic City, New Jersey
4	CFFC 4: The War on the Shore	April 13, 2007	Tropicana Casino & Resort Atlantic City	(United States) Atlantic City, New Jersey
3	CFFC 3: Battleground	January 19, 2007	Tropicana Casino & Resort Atlantic City	(United States) Atlantic City, New Jersey
2	CFFC 2: Throwdown at the Tropicana	October 6, 2006	Tropicana Casino & Resort Atlantic City	(United States) Atlantic City, New Jersey
1	Cage Fury Fighting Championships 1	June 30, 2006	Tropicana Casino & Resort Atlantic City	(United States) Atlantic City, New Jersey
