= UFC on Fox: Machida vs. Rockhold =

UFC mixed martial arts event in 2015

- The poster for UFC on Fox: Machida vs. Rockhold
- Promotion: Ultimate Fighting Championship
- Date: April 18, 2015
- Venue: Prudential Center
- City: Newark, New Jersey
- Attendance: 13,306
- Total gate: $1,200,000

Event chronology
UFC Fight Night: Gonzaga vs. Cro Cop 2	UFC on Fox: Machida vs. Rockhold	UFC 186: Johnson vs. Horiguchi

UFC on Fox: Machida vs. Rockhold (also known as UFC on Fox 15) was a mixed martial arts event held on April 18, 2015, at the Prudential Center in Newark, New Jersey.

== Background ==
The event was the sixth event that the UFC has hosted in Newark, New Jersey and was headlined by a middleweight bout between former UFC Light Heavyweight champion Lyoto Machida and former Strikeforce Middleweight champion Luke Rockhold.

Manvel Gamburyan was expected to face Aljamain Sterling at the event. However, on February 3, Gamburyan pulled out of the bout citing injury and was replaced by Takeya Mizugaki.

A middleweight bout between Ronaldo Souza and Yoel Romero was originally booked for UFC 184. However, the bout was cancelled due to Souza being struck with pneumonia. The fight was later rescheduled for this event. However, on April 10, Romero pulled out of the bout due to a ligament and meniscus tear in his knee. On the next day, Chris Camozzi was announced as his replacement. The fight was a rematch as Souza defeated Camozzi by technical submission (arm-triangle choke) at UFC on FX: Belfort vs. Rockhold.

A featherweight bout between Diego Brandão and Jimy Hettes was originally booked for UFC 183. However, the bout was canceled right before the event started, as Hettes passed out backstage. The fight was later rescheduled for this event.

George Sullivan was expected to face Kenny Robertson at the event. However, Robertson pulled out of the bout citing injury and was replaced by Tim Means.

Nick Catone was expected to face Vitor Miranda at the event. However, Catone abruptly announced his retirement on March 25, citing a litany of injuries and a history of chronic back pain. With a rib injury, Miranda was also pulled from the card.

Paul Felder was expected to face Jim Miller at this event. However, Felder was forced to pull out of the event due to a knee injury and was replaced by Beneil Dariush.

== Results ==
Main Card (Fox)
Weight class				Method	Round	Time	Notes
Middleweight	Luke Rockhold	def.	Lyoto Machida	Submission (rear-naked choke)	2	2:31
Middleweight	Ronaldo Souza	def.	Chris Camozzi	Verbal Submission (armbar)	1	2:33
Featherweight	Max Holloway	def.	Cub Swanson	Submission (guillotine choke)	3	3:58
Women's Strawweight	Paige VanZant	def.	Felice Herrig	Decision (unanimous) (30–26, 29–27, 30–26)	3	5:00
Preliminary Card (Fox)
Lightweight	Beneil Dariush	def.	Jim Miller	Decision (unanimous) (29–28, 29–28, 29–28)	3	5:00
Light Heavyweight	Ovince Saint Preux	def.	Patrick Cummins	KO (punches)	1	4:54
Light Heavyweight	Gian Villante	def.	Corey Anderson	TKO (punches)	3	4:18
Bantamweight	Aljamain Sterling	def.	Takeya Mizugaki	Submission (arm-triangle choke)	3	2:11
Preliminary Card (UFC Fight Pass)
Welterweight	Tim Means	def.	George Sullivan	Submission (arm-triangle choke)	3	3:41
Featherweight	Diego Brandão	def.	Jimy Hettes	TKO (doctor stoppage)	1	5:00
Middleweight	Chris Dempsey	def.	Eddie Gordon	Decision (split) (29–28, 28–29, 29–28)	3	5:00

== Bonus awards ==
The following fighters were awarded $50,000 bonuses:

- Fight of the Night: Gian Villante vs. Corey Anderson
- Performance of the Night: Luke Rockhold and Max Holloway

== See also ==
- List of UFC events
- 2015 in UFC
