= William Worthing =

American politician (1909–1988)

Member of the Nebraska Legislature from the 6th district
- In office January 5, 1937 – January 3, 1939
- Preceded by: Position created
- Succeeded by: Sam Klaver

Member of the Nebraska House of Representatives from the 17th district
- In office January 1, 1935 – October 25, 1935
- Preceded by: Jackson B. Chase
- Succeeded by: George E. Truman

Personal details
- Born: July 28, 1909 Omaha, Nebraska
- Died: July 26, 1988 (aged 78) Carlsbad, California
- Party: Democratic
- Education: Creighton University (Ph.B., LL.B.)
- Occupation: Attorney, general agent

William Edward Worthing (July 28, 1909 – July 26, 1988) was a Democratic politician from Nebraska who served as a member of the Nebraska House of Representatives from the 17th district in 1935 and as a member of the Nebraska Legislature from the 6th district from 1937 to 1939.

== Early life ==
Worthing was born in Omaha, Nebraska in 1909. He graduated from Omaha Tech High School and later attended Creighton University. While at Creighton, he played as a starting forward on the basketball team and as quarterback and halfback on the football teams. Worthing was inducted into the Creighton University Athletic Hall of Fame in 1970. He graduated from Creighton with his bachelor's degree in philosophy in 1932, and from the School of Law in 1934.

== Nebraska House of Representatives ==
In 1934, Republican State Representative Jackson B. Chase announced that he would run for Attorney General, and Worthing ran to succeed him in the 17th district. In the Democratic primary, he faced accountant John Ryan, printer Willard Larson, and attorney George E. Truman. Worthing narrowly won the primary, receiving 33 percent of the vote to Ryan's 31 percent, a margin of 32 votes. Worthing faced Hunter Scott, the Republican nominee, in the general election, and defeated him with 52 percent of the vote.

== Works Progress Administration ==
Worthing was appointed as the assistant personal officer for the Works Progress Administration in Douglas, Sarpy, and Washington counties. When Governor Robert Cochran called a special session in October 1935 for a state relief bill, Worthing's ability to serve was challenged in light of a state constitutional provision on dual office-holding. Worthing subsequently resigned from the legislature on October 25, 1935, in advance of the special session.

On March 4, 1936, Worthing resigned from the WPA, and resumed the practice of law, joining the firm of Crofoot, Frasier, Connolly & Stryker.

== Nebraska Legislature ==
Following the abolition of the bicameral legislature and creation of a unicameral legislature, Worthing ran for the newly created 6th district. He faced a crowded field of nineteen opponents, and placed first. Worthing proceeded to the general election with attorney Sam Klaver. He defeated Klaver with 56 percent of the vote.

Worthing ran for re-election in 1938, and was challenged by Klaver again. The contest between the two was close, and Klaver appeared to narrowly defeat Worthing by a 31-vote margin. Worthing initially announced that he would contest the election before the state legislature, but on December 29, 1938, conceded the race.

== Post-legislative career ==
After leaving the legislature, Worthing remained active in politics, registering as a lobbyist and managing former Governor Keith Neville's Omaha-area campaign operations in 1940. He later moved to Los Angeles, California, to manage the Hall-Worthing Agency, a regional claims representative for Mutual of Omaha.

== Death ==
Worthing died on July 26, 1988, in Carlsbad, California.
