= George Sullivan (fighter) =

American mixed martial arts fighter

- Born: March 13, 1981 (age 45); Red Bank, New Jersey, United States
- Other names: The Silencer
- Nationality: American
- Height: 6 ft 0 in (1.83 m)
- Weight: 170 lb (77 kg; 12 st 2 lb)
- Division: Middleweight; Welterweight
- Reach: 73 1/2 in (187 cm)
- Fighting out of: Belmar, New Jersey, United States
- Team: Pellegrino MMA
- Trainer: Kurt Pellegrino
- Rank: Brown belt in Brazilian Jiu-Jitsu under Kurt Pellegrino
- Years active: 2006–2023

Mixed martial arts record
- Total: 29
- Wins: 19
- By knockout: 11
- By decision: 8
- Losses: 8
- By knockout: 1
- By submission: 5
- By decision: 2
- No contests: 2

Other information
- Mixed martial arts record from Sherdog

George Sullivan (born March 13, 1981) is an American retired mixed martial artist who competed in the Welterweight and Middleweight divisions. A professional mixed martial artist from 2006 till 2023, Sullivan had most notably competed in the Ultimate Fighting Championship.

== Mixed martial arts career ==
=== Early career ===
Sullivan made his professional debut in 2006 competing in regional promotions in his native New Jersey, compiled a record of 14–3, and won the Cage Fury Fighting Championships Welterweight Championship. Sullivan signed with the UFC in the winter of 2013.

=== Ultimate Fighting Championship ===
Sullivan made his promotional debut against fellow newcomer Mike Rhodes on January 25, 2014, at UFC on Fox 10. Sullivan won the fight via unanimous decision.

In his next fight, Sullivan faced Igor Araújo on September 13, 2014, at UFC Fight Night 51. After winning the first round, Sullivan won the bout via knockout in the second round as he was able to land several punches from within Araújo's half guard, forcing the referee to stop the fight.

Sullivan was expected to face Kenny Robertson on April 18, 2015, at UFC on Fox 15. However, Robertson pulled out of the bout citing injury and was replaced by Tim Means. He lost the back and forth fight via submission in the third round.

Sullivan was expected to face Marcio Alexandre Jr. on July 12, 2015, at The Ultimate Fighter 21 Finale. However, Alexandre pulled out of the fight during the week leading up to the event citing a rib injury and was replaced by promotional newcomer Dominic Waters. Sullivan won the one-sided fight via unanimous decision.

Sullivan faced Alexander Yakovlev at UFC on Fox 18 on January 30, 2016. He lost the fight via knockout in the first round.

Sullivan was expected to face Héctor Urbina on July 23, 2016, at UFC on Fox 20. However, Sullivan was pulled from the event due to a "potential compliance issue" with the UFC's anti-doping policy stemming from "voluntarily disclosed information" he provided to USADA.

Sullivan was expected to face Randy Brown on February 11, 2017, at UFC 208, but was pulled from the card after USADA informed him of another potential violation.

Sullivan faced Niko Price January 27, 2018 at UFC on Fox: Jacaré vs. Brunson 2. He lost the fight via rear-naked choke submission in the second round.

Sullivan faced Mickey Gall on August 25, 2018, at UFC Fight Night 135. He lost the fight via rear-naked choke submission in the first round.

It was announced in October 2018 that Sullivan was released from UFC.

=== Post UFC ===
In November 2018, the fighter faced Manny Walo at Maverick MMA 10 in Stroudsburg, Pennsylvania, for the Maverick MMA Welterweight Championship. Sullivan lost this match by a unanimous decision, before he bounced back with a win against Thomas Powell in his middleweight debut at Ring of Combat 68 in May 2019, in Atlantic City, New Jersey with a unanimous decision victory. A match against Joe Riggs at Ring of Combat 70 in November 2019 ended originally in a third round TKO stoppage victory for Riggs, before it was overturned to a no-contest (NC) after Riggs tested positive for banned substances. Finally, on March 3, 2023, the fighter won the vacant ROC Middleweight Championship against Albert McCowin in Atlantic City, New Jersey, with a unanimous decision, before retiring from the sport.

== Championships and accomplishments ==
- Cage Fury Fighting Championships
  - CFFC Welterweight Championship (One time)

== Mixed martial arts record ==
Professional record breakdown
| 29 matches | 19 wins | 8 losses |
| By knockout | 11 | 1 |
| By submission | 0 | 5 |
| By decision | 8 | 2 |
| No contests | 2 | |

| Res. | Record | Opponent | Method | Event | Date | Round | Time | Location | Notes |
|---|---|---|---|---|---|---|---|---|---|
| Win | 19–8 (2) | Albert McCowin | Decision (unanimous) | Ring of Combat 79 | March 3, 2023 | 3 | 5:00 | Atlantic City, New Jersey, United States | Won the vacant ROC Middleweight Championship. |
| NC | 18–8 (2) | Joe Riggs | NC (overturned) | Ring of Combat 70 | November 23, 2019 | 3 | 2:08 | Atlantic City, New Jersey, United States | |
| Win | 18–8 (1) | Thomas Powell | Decision (unanimous) | Ring of Combat 68 | May 31, 2019 | 3 | 4:00 | Atlantic City, New Jersey, United States | Middleweight debut. |
| Loss | 17–8 (1) | Manny Walo | Decision (unanimous) | Maverick MMA 10 | November 17, 2018 | 5 | 5:00 | Stroudsburg, Pennsylvania, United States | For the Maverick MMA Welterweight Championship. |
| Loss | 17–7 (1) | Mickey Gall | Submission (rear-naked choke) | UFC Fight Night: Gaethje vs. Vick | August 25, 2018 | 1 | 1:09 | Lincoln, Nebraska, United States | |
| Loss | 17–6 (1) | Niko Price | Submission (rear-naked choke) | UFC on Fox: Jacaré vs. Brunson 2 | January 27, 2018 | 2 | 4:21 | Charlotte, North Carolina, United States | |
| Loss | 17–5 (1) | Alexander Yakovlev | KO (punch) | UFC on Fox: Johnson vs. Bader | January 30, 2016 | 1 | 3:59 | Newark, New Jersey, United States | |
| Win | 17–4 (1) | Dominic Waters | Decision (unanimous) | The Ultimate Fighter: American Top Team vs. Blackzilians Finale | July 12, 2015 | 3 | 5:00 | Las Vegas, Nevada, United States | |
| Loss | 16–4 (1) | Tim Means | Submission (arm-triangle choke) | UFC on Fox: Machida vs. Rockhold | April 18, 2015 | 3 | 3:41 | Newark, New Jersey, United States | |
| Win | 16–3 (1) | Igor Araújo | KO (punches) | UFC Fight Night: Bigfoot vs. Arlovski | September 13, 2014 | 2 | 2:31 | Brasília, Brazil | |
| Win | 15–3 (1) | Mike Rhodes | Decision (unanimous) | UFC on Fox: Henderson vs. Thomson | January 25, 2014 | 3 | 5:00 | Chicago, Illinois, United States | |
| Win | 14–3 (1) | Jesus Martinez | TKO (punches) | CFFC 26 | August 17, 2013 | 2 | 3:12 | Atlantic City, New Jersey, United States | Defended the CFFC Welterweight Championship. |
| Win | 13–3 (1) | Brandon Becker | TKO (punches) | CFFC 24 | May 11, 2013 | 2 | 1:53 | Atlantic City, New Jersey, United States | Defended the CFFC Welterweight Championship. |
| Win | 12–3 (1) | Julian Lane | TKO (punches) | CFFC 19 | February 2, 2013 | 2 | 2:30 | Atlantic City, New Jersey, United States | Defended the CFFC Welterweight Championship. |
| Win | 11–3 (1) | Tenyeh Dixon | Decision (unanimous) | CFFC 16 | August 24, 2012 | 5 | 5:00 | Atlantic City, New Jersey, United States | Defended the CFFC Welterweight Championship. |
| Win | 10–3 (1) | Greg Soto | KO (punch) | CFFC 14 | April 14, 2012 | 1 | 2:03 | Atlantic City, New Jersey, United States | Won the CFFC Welterweight Championship. |
| Win | 9–3 (1) | Mike Winters | Decision (unanimous) | CFFC 12 | December 10, 2011 | 3 | 5:00 | Atlantic City, New Jersey, United States | |
| Loss | 8–3 (1) | Elijah Harshbarger | Decision (unanimous) | Ring of Combat 35 | April 8, 2011 | 3 | 5:00 | Atlantic City, New Jersey, United States | For Ring of Combat Welterweight Championship. |
| Win | 8–2 (1) | Erik Oganov | Decision (unanimous) | Ring of Combat 33 | December 3, 2010 | 3 | 4:00 | Atlantic City, New Jersey, United States | |
| Win | 7–2 (1) | James Frier | TKO (knees and punches) | Ring of Combat 31 | September 24, 2010 | 1 | 2:24 | Atlantic City, New Jersey, United States | |
| Win | 6–2 (1) | Tiawan Howard | TKO (punches) | Ring of Combat 29 | April 16, 2010 | 2 | 2:31 | Atlantic City, New Jersey, United States | |
| Win | 5–2 (1) | Al Buck | TKO (punches) | WCA: Pure Combat | February 6, 2009 | 1 | 3:58 | Atlantic City, New Jersey, United States | |
| Loss | 4–2 (1) | Nick Calandrino | Submission (eye injury) | BCX 4 | April 19, 2008 | 1 | 3:13 | Atlantic City, New Jersey, United States | |
| Win | 4–1 (1) | Roberto Concepcion | TKO (knees and punches) | BCX 3 | October 20, 2007 | 1 | 1:38 | Atlantic City, New Jersey, United States | |
| Win | 3–1 (1) | David Porter | TKO (punches) | Ring of Combat 13 | March 16, 2007 | 1 | 2:08 | Atlantic City, New Jersey, United States | Catchweight (180 lbs) bout. |
| Loss | 2–1 (1) | Marc Stevens | Submission (rear-naked choke) | CITC: Marked Territory | September 30, 2006 | 3 | 2:58 | Lincroft, New Jersey, United States | |
| NC | 2–0 (1) | Rob Russo | NC (illegal knee) | Reality Fighting 13 | August 5, 2006 | 2 | 1:12 | Wildwood, New Jersey, United States | |
| Win | 2–0 | Anthony D'Angelo | Decision (split) | Reality Fighting 12 | April 29, 2006 | 3 | 3:00 | Atlantic City, New Jersey, United States | |
| Win | 1–0 | Gregg Small | TKO (punches) | Reality Fighting 11 | February 11, 2006 | 2 | 1:30 | Atlantic City, New Jersey, United States | |

== See also ==
- List of current UFC fighters
- List of male mixed martial artists
