= Pokrajac =

- Pronunciation: Serbo-Croatian pronunciation: [ˈpɔkrajats]

Origin
- Language: South Slavic
- Region of origin: Balkans

Pokrajac (Cyrillic: Покрајац, pronounced [ˈpɔkrajats]) is a Serbo-Croatian surname. There exist at least three theories as to its origin. According to one, it came into being when there was an individual who served the Austro-Hungarian forces on the military border – the past border between Austria and Bosnia, which later belonged to the Ottomans. Since the border was near the edge ("kraj") of the country, the surname Pokrajac came about. Pokrajac, therefore, is a name that describes an individual who lives or exists on an edge, or end ("kraj").

"Potkraj", in Bosnian, means "at the bottom of a mountain slope", and there are a number of villages in Bosnia named "Potkraj". It is possible that people living in "Potkraj" got the word "Potkrajac" as their surname. Since "Pokrajac" is easier to pronounce, it is likely that letter "t" disappeared over time.

Today, the surname Pokrajac can be found in many countries: Serbia, Montenegro, Bosnia, Croatia, Canada, Australia, United States and many other countries across the globe.

At least 97 people surnamed Pokrajac were killed in the Jasenovac concentration camp.

== People ==
- David Pokrajac (born 1970), Serbian-American scientist
- Branislav Pokrajac, Serbian handball left winger, Olympic gold medalist
- Igor Pokrajac (born 1979), mixed-martial arts fighter from Croatia
- Steve Pokrajac (born 1987), bassist of Australian rock band 'Ivy'
- Benny Pokrajac (born 1991), drummer of Australian rock band 'Ivy'
