= Zadro =

Zadro is a Croatian surname. Notable people with the surname include:

- Blago Zadro (1944–1991), Croatian soldier
- Paul Zadro (born 1963), Australian martial artist, sport administrator, and promoter
- Vlado Zadro
- Enoch Zadro (1876-1950), doctor, surgeon, and namesake of a street in Rovinj, Croatia
