= UFC 110 =

UFC mixed martial arts event in 2010

UFC 110: Nogueira vs. Velasquez
- The poster for UFC 110: Nogueira vs. Velasquez
- Promotion: Ultimate Fighting Championship
- Date: February 21, 2010
- Venue: Acer Arena
- City: Sydney, Australia
- Attendance: 17,431
- Total gate: $2,500,000
- Buyrate: 240,000

Event chronology
UFC 109: Relentless	UFC 110: Nogueira vs. Velasquez	UFC Live: Vera vs. Jones

UFC 110: Nogueira vs. Velasquez was a mixed martial arts event held by the Ultimate Fighting Championship (UFC) on Sunday, February 21, 2010, in Sydney, Australia, at Acer Arena. The event marked the UFC's first trip to Australia. The main card was scheduled for 2:00 pm Sunday in Sydney to cater to the U.S. audience, meaning that the event took place at the regular U.S. time (10:00 pm ET, on Saturday February 20).

The event drew 17,431 fans, a sell out of A$2.5 million. 400 tickets were sold to a closed circuit viewing party at the Arena's Ballroom, making the number of total fans inside the building 17,831. The event grossed $540,000 in merchandise sales, breaking the previous record of $498,000 at UFC 83. Total sales topped the previous Acer Arena record held by Iron Maiden.

== Background ==
The long expected bout between Yoshihiro Akiyama and Wanderlei Silva did not take place at this event. Instead, Silva faced Michael Bisping.

A bout between Nate Marquardt and Chael Sonnen which was expected to take place on this card was moved to UFC 109. A bout between Keith Jardine and Rich Franklin had been discussed, but Jardine eventually fought the Ultimate Fighter 8 winner Ryan Bader.

Chris Lytle was expected to face Dong Hyun Kim, but Kim was forced off the card with an injury. Brian Foster stepped in to fight Lytle.

A bout between Elvis Sinosic and Chris Haseman was due to be the first ever all-Australian bout to take place in the UFC. However, a shoulder injury forced Sinosic out of the fight on 18 February, and bout was pulled from the card as a result. Additionally, Ben Rothwell was sidelined by an illness, leading to Australian veteran Anthony Perosh stepping in to face Mirko Cro Cop.

Tickets for the event sold out on the first day they were available to the general public. It was, at the time, the second fastest sellout of an event in the history of the UFC, behind UFC 83 (which was the first ever UFC event in Canada). This record was later broken by UFC 127, the second event to be held in Australia. UFC 110 aired live on Australian free-to-air sports channel ONE HD.

== Results ==
Main card
Weight class				Method	Round	Time	Notes
Heavyweight	Cain Velasquez	def.	Antônio Rodrigo Nogueira	KO (punches)	1	2:20
Middleweight	Wanderlei Silva	def.	Michael Bisping	Decision (unanimous) (29–28, 29–28, 29–28)	3	5:00
Lightweight	George Sotiropoulos	def.	Joe Stevenson	Decision (unanimous) (30–27, 30–27, 30–27)	3	5:00
Light Heavyweight	Ryan Bader	def.	Keith Jardine	KO (flying knee and punch)	3	2:10
Heavyweight	Mirko Cro Cop	def.	Anthony Perosh	TKO (doctor stoppage)	2	5:00
Preliminary card
Light Heavyweight	Krzysztof Soszynski	def.	Stephan Bonnar	TKO (doctor stoppage)	3	1:04
Welterweight	Chris Lytle	def.	Brian Foster	Submission (kneebar)	1	1:41
Middleweight	C. B. Dollaway	def.	Goran Reljic	Decision (unanimous) (29–28, 29–28, 29–28)	3	5:00
Light Heavyweight	James Te Huna	def.	Igor Pokrajac	TKO (punches)	3	3:26

== Bonus awards ==
The following fighters received $50,000 bonuses.

- Fight of the Night: Joe Stevenson vs. George Sotiropoulos
- Knockout of the Night: Cain Velasquez
- Submission of the Night: Chris Lytle

== See also ==
- 2010 in UFC
- List of UFC events
- Mixed martial arts in Australia
