= UFC Fight Night: Te Huna vs. Marquardt =

UFC mixed martial arts event in 2014

- The poster for UFC Fight Night: Te Huna vs. Marquardt
- Promotion: Ultimate Fighting Championship
- Date: 28 June 2014
- Venue: Vector Arena
- City: Auckland, New Zealand
- Attendance: 8,089
- Total gate: $913,000

Event chronology
UFC 174: Johnson vs. Bagautinov	UFC Fight Night: Te Huna vs. Marquardt	UFC Fight Night: Swanson vs. Stephens

UFC Fight Night: Te Huna vs. Marquardt (also known as UFC Fight Night 43) was a mixed martial arts event held on 28 June 2014, at Vector Arena in Auckland, New Zealand.

== Background ==
The event was the first that the organization hosted in New Zealand, it took place at the Vector Arena in Auckland.

The event was the first of two that took place on 28 June, the other being UFC Fight Night: Swanson vs. Stephens.

Anthony Perosh was expected to face Gian Villante at the event. However, Perosh was forced out of the bout with an injury and was replaced by Sean O'Connell.

Cláudio Silva was expected to face Neil Magny at the event but was forced out of the bout with an injury and was replaced by promotional newcomer and former Jungle Fight Welterweight Champion Rodrigo de Lima.

Richie Vaculik was expected to face Jon Delos Reyes at the event. However, Reyes was forced from the bout with an injury and replaced by promotional newcomer Roldan Sangcha-an.

== Results ==
Main Card (UFC Fight Pass)
Weight class				Method	Round	Time	Notes
Middleweight	Nate Marquardt	def.	James Te Huna	Submission (armbar)	1	4:34
Heavyweight	Jared Rosholt	def.	Soa Palelei	Decision (unanimous) (30–27, 30–27, 30–27)	3	5:00
Featherweight	Charles Oliveira	def.	Hatsu Hioki	Submission (anaconda choke)	2	4:32
Welterweight	Robert Whittaker	def.	Mike Rhodes	Decision (unanimous) (30–27, 30–27, 30–27)	3	5:00
Preliminary card (UFC Fight Pass)
Lightweight	Jake Matthews	def.	Dashon Johnson	Submission (triangle choke)	3	3:16	(Note: Johnson had 1 point deducted in round 2 due to strikes to the back of the head.)
Flyweight	Richie Vaculik	def.	Roldan Sangcha-an	Decision (unanimous) (30–27, 29–28, 29–28)	3	5:00
Welterweight	Vik Grujic	def.	Chris Indich	TKO (punches)	1	4:55
Welterweight	Neil Magny	def.	Rodrigo de Lima	TKO (punches)	2	2:32
Featherweight	Dan Hooker	def.	Ian Entwistle	TKO (elbows)	1	3:34
Light Heavyweight	Gian Villante	def.	Sean O'Connell	Decision (split) (29–28, 28–29, 29–28)	3	5:00

== Bonus awards ==
The following fighters received $50,000 bonuses:

- Fight of the Night: Gian Villante vs. Sean O'Connell
- Performance of the Night: Nate Marquardt and Charles Oliveira

== See also ==
- 2014 in UFC
- List of UFC events
