= Igor Pokrajac =

Croatian mixed martial arts fighter

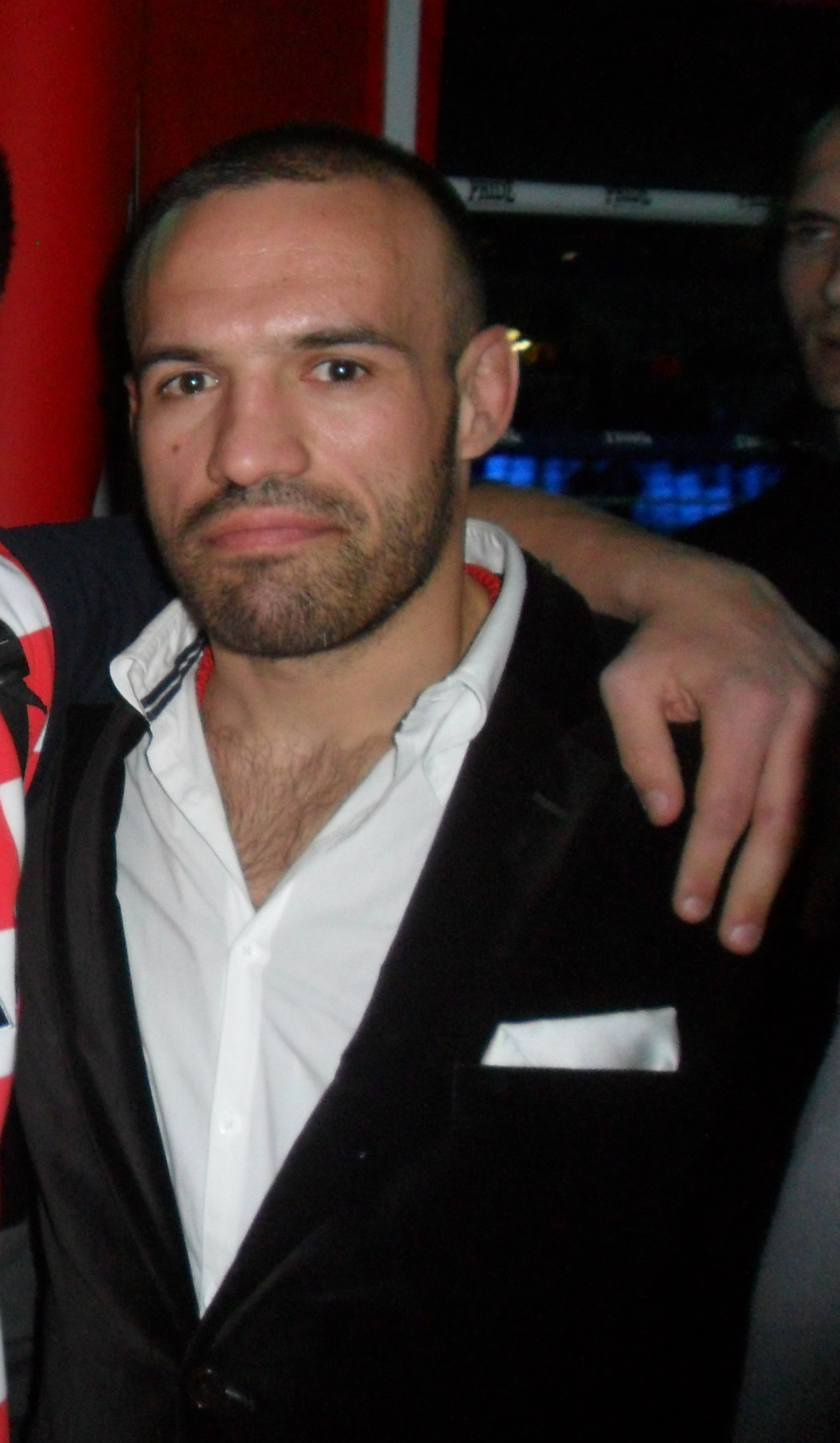
- Born: 2 January 1979 (age 47); Zagreb, SR Croatia, Yugoslavia
- Other names: The Duke
- Nationality: Croatian
- Height: 6 ft 0 in (183 cm)
- Weight: 205 lb (93 kg; 14 st 9 lb)
- Division: Heavyweight; Light Heavyweight
- Reach: 74 in (188 cm)
- Fighting out of: Zagreb, Croatia
- Team: American Top Team, Team CroCop
- Rank: Purple belt in Brazilian Jiu-Jitsu under Bojan Mirkovic
- Years active: 2003–2020 (MMA)

Mixed martial arts record
- Total: 45
- Wins: 29
- By knockout: 16
- By submission: 9
- By decision: 4
- Losses: 15
- By knockout: 8
- By submission: 2
- By decision: 5
- No contests: 1

Other information
- Mixed martial arts record from Sherdog

Igor Pokrajac (born 2 January 1979) is a Croatian mixed martial artist, who formerly competed in the Light Heavyweight division of the Ultimate Fighting Championship. A professional competitor since 2003, Pokrajac has also formerly competed for K-1, KSW, It's Showtime, and Jungle Fight promotions.

== Mixed martial arts career ==
=== Early career ===
Pokrajac started his professional MMA career in 2003, primarily competing in his native Croatia. Over the next six years, he compiled an impressive record of 21–5.

=== Ultimate Fighting Championship ===
In August 2009, it was announced he had signed with the UFC, with his first fight taking place against Vladimir Matyushenko on September 19, 2009, at UFC 103. He lost the fight via unanimous decision.

Pokrajac next faced James Te-Huna on February 21, 2010, at UFC 110. Pokrajac lost again, this time via third-round TKO, due to strikes. This loss was somewhat controversial, as Te Huna had Pokrajac in a modified crucifix position on the mat and landed five to six clean shots to Pokrajac's face and although Pokrajac was not able to defend himself from this position, he was signalling to the referee that he was okay, although the ref did not acknowledge this, and stopped the fight after the unanswered shots from Te Huna. Although visibly dazed, Pokrajac disputed the stoppage directly after the fight to no avail.

Pokrajac then faced James Irvin on August 1, 2010, at UFC on Versus 2. Midway through the first round, Pokrajac took Irvin down and immediately got side control on the floor. After taking multiple strikes, Irvin rolled over and was submitted by a rear naked choke, handing Pokrajac his first UFC victory.

Pokrajac fought Stephan Bonnar on December 4, 2010, at The Ultimate Fighter 12 Finale. Pokrajac lost a unanimous decision.

Pokrajac defeated Todd Brown on March 3, 2011, at UFC Live: Sanchez vs. Kampmann by TKO at the conclusion of the first round. Brown was dropped by a knee in the final minute and hit with several clean follow up shots, being saved by the end of the round. When the fighters went back to their corners, Brown was unable to stand on his own power and the fight was stopped.

Pokrajac was expected to face Krzysztof Soszynski on June 11, 2011, at UFC 131, replacing an injured Anthony Perosh. However, Pokrajac was himself forced out of the bout with an injury and replaced by returning UFC veteran Mike Massenzio.

Pokrajac/Soszynski ultimately took place on December 10, 2011, at UFC 140. Pokrajac defeated Soszynski via first-round KO.

Pokrajac was expected to face Thiago Silva on May 15, 2012, at UFC on Fuel TV: Korean Zombie vs. Poirier, replacing an injured Brandon Vera. However, Silva was pulled from the bout to face Alexander Gustafsson on April 14, 2012, at UFC on Fuel TV 2 after Gustafsson's original opponent Antônio Rogério Nogueira pulled out of the bout citing an injury. Pokrajac instead faced Fábio Maldonado at the event. He won the fight via unanimous decision (29–28, 30–27, and 29–28).

Pokrajac was defeated by Vinny Magalhães via second round armbar on September 22, 2012, at UFC 152.

Pokrajac next faced Joey Beltran on December 15, 2012, at UFC on FX 6, replacing an injured Anthony Perosh. Pokrajac lost the fight via unanimous decision. However, on January 10, 2013, it was announced that Beltran had failed his post fight drug test, testing positive for nandrolone and the result of the bout was changed to No Contest.

Pokrajac faced Ryan Jimmo at UFC 161 in Winnipeg, Manitoba on June 15, 2013. He lost the fight via unanimous decision.

Pokrajac faced Rafael Cavalcante on November 9, 2013, at UFC Fight Night 32. He lost via submission due to strikes in the first round.

Pokrajac faced Marcos Rogério de Lima on December 20, 2014, at UFC Fight Night 58. He lost the fight via TKO in the first round, and was subsequently released from the promotion shortly after.

=== Post UFC ===
After being released from Ultimate Fighting Championship Pokrajac signed for Croatia's Final Fight Championship promotion. His debut was expected to be against Maciej Browarski, but he was replaced and he will now make his debut in heavyweight division against Archontis Taxiarchis at FFC 18 - Ljubljana on 17 April 2015. He weighed 102 kg at official weight ins.

=== Second UFC stint ===
After recording three first round stoppage victories on the regional circuit across the Balkans, Pokrajac was re-signed for a second stint in the UFC. He faced Jan Błachowicz on April 10, 2016, at UFC Fight Night 86. Pokrajac lost the fight via unanimous decision.

Pokrajac was expected to face Ed Herman on March 4, 2017, at UFC 209. However, Pokrajac pulled out of the fight in early February citing an injury, and was replaced by Gadzhimurad Antigulov.

On May 4, 2019, it was reported that Pokrajac was released by the UFC for a second time.

== Accomplishments and championships ==
- Serbian Battle Championship
  - SBC Light Heavyweight Championship (one time)

== Mixed martial arts record ==
Professional record breakdown
45 matches	29 wins	15 losses
By knockout	16	8
By submission	9	2
By decision	4	5
No contests	1	

Res.	Record	Opponent	Method	Event	Date	Round	Time	Location	Notes
Loss	29–15 (1)	Michał Kita	TKO (punches)	FEN 28 - Lotos Fight Night	June 13, 2020	1	0:37	Lublin, Poland	Return to Heavyweight.
Win	29–14 (1)	Maiquel Falcão	TKO (elbows and punches)	Serbian Battle Championship 25	December 7, 2019	1	3:24	Novi Sad, Serbia	Won the SBC Light Heavyweight Championship.
Loss	28–14 (1)	Maiquel Falcão	TKO (punches)	Serbian Battle Championship 21	May 4, 2019	1	4:55	Odžaci, Serbia	
Loss	28–13 (1)	Jan Błachowicz	Decision (unanimous)	UFC Fight Night: Rothwell vs. dos Santos	April 10, 2016	3	5:00	Zagreb, Croatia	
Win	28–12 (1)	Zauri Maisuradze	Submission (armbar)	FFC 20: Zagreb	October 23, 2015	1	1:16	Zagreb, Croatia	
Win	27–12 (1)	Rudolf Pavlin	TKO (elbows)	Montenegro Fighting Championship 3	July 27, 2015	1	2:35	Budva, Montenegro	Return to Light Heavyweight.
Win	26–12 (1)	Archontis Taxiarchis	TKO (punches)	FFC 18: Ljubljana	April 17, 2015	1	3:03	Ljubljana, Slovenia	Heavyweight debut.
Loss	25–12 (1)	Marcos Rogério de Lima	TKO (punches)	UFC Fight Night: Machida vs. Dollaway	December 20, 2014	1	1:59	Barueri, Brazil	
Loss	25–11 (1)	Rafael Cavalcante	TKO (submission to knees and punches)	UFC Fight Night: Belfort vs. Henderson	November 9, 2013	1	1:18	Goiânia, Brazil	
Loss	25–10 (1)	Ryan Jimmo	Decision (unanimous)	UFC 161	June 15, 2013	3	5:00	Winnipeg, Manitoba, Canada	
NC	25–9 (1)	Joey Beltran	NC (overturned)	UFC on FX: Sotiropoulos vs. Pearson	December 15, 2012	3	5:00	Gold Coast, Australia	Originally a unanimous decision win for Beltran; overturned after he tested positive for banned substances.
Loss	25–9	Vinny Magalhães	Submission (armbar)	UFC 152	September 22, 2012	2	1:14	Toronto, Ontario, Canada	
Win	25–8	Fábio Maldonado	Decision (unanimous)	UFC on Fuel TV: Korean Zombie vs. Poirier	May 15, 2012	3	5:00	Fairfax, Virginia, United States	
Win	24–8	Krzysztof Soszynski	KO (punches)	UFC 140	December 10, 2011	1	0:35	Toronto, Ontario, Canada	
Win	23–8	Todd Brown	TKO (knee and punches)	UFC Live: Sanchez vs. Kampmann	March 3, 2011	1	5:00	Louisville, Kentucky, United States	
Loss	22–8	Stephan Bonnar	Decision (unanimous)	The Ultimate Fighter: Team GSP vs. Team Koscheck Finale	December 4, 2010	3	5:00	Las Vegas, Nevada, United States	
Win	22–7	James Irvin	Submission (rear-naked choke)	UFC Live: Jones vs. Matyushenko	August 1, 2010	1	2:28	San Diego, California, United States	
Loss	21–7	James Te Huna	TKO (punches)	UFC 110	February 21, 2010	3	3:26	Sydney, Australia	
Loss	21–6	Vladimir Matyushenko	Decision (unanimous)	UFC 103	September 19, 2009	3	5:00	Dallas, Texas, United States	
Win	21–5	Kalvis Gebauers	TKO (punches)	WFC 8: D-Day	April 18, 2009	1	1:16	Ljubljana, Slovenia	
Win	20–5	Roderik Jambor	TKO (punches and elbows)	K-1 ColliZion 2009 Croatia	March 21, 2009	1	1:09	Split, Croatia	
Win	19–5	Mihajlo Fincur	TKO (punches)	Grand Fight	December 27, 2008	1	3:59	Varaždin, Croatia	
Win	18–5	Patrik Jevický	Submission (rear-naked choke)	Ultimate Fight: Challenge 3	December 6, 2008	1	1:42	Samobor, Croatia	
Win	17–5	Jan Antoska	Submission (armbar)	Hell Cage 1	May 3, 2008	2	3:39	Prague, Czech Republic	
Win	16–5	Martin Zawada	Submission (rear-naked choke)	Balans: It's Showtime 75MAX Trophy Final 2008	March 15, 2008	1	1:01	's-Hertogenbosch, Netherlands	
Win	15–5	Marko Sintic	TKO (punches)	Ultimate Fight: Challenge 2	December 15, 2007	2	2:00	Samobor, Croatia	
Win	14–5	Ladislav Zak	Decision (unanimous)	OB-Gula: Fight Night	December 8, 2007	3	5:00	Ogulin, Croatia	
Loss	13–5	Mamed Khalidov	Submission (kneebar)	Boxing Explosion 2	August 2, 2007	2	0:55	Pag, Croatia	
Win	13–4	Bojan Spalevic	TKO (elbows)	Osijek Challenge 07	May 27, 2007	1	0:43	Osijek, Croatia	
Win	12–4	Slaven Planinic	TKO (knee and punches)	Bilic Fight Night	April 25, 2007	1	3:09	Zagreb, Croatia	
Win	11–4	Sasa Lazic	Submission (armbar)	Noc Gladiatora 1	March 16, 2007	1	2:02	Karlovac, Croatia	
Loss	10–4	Assuério Silva	Decision (split)	Jungle Fight Europe	December 17, 2006	3	5:00	Ljubljana, Slovenia	
Win	10–3	Ivan Brguljan	Decision (unanimous)	International Fight Night	August 3, 2006	1	4:01	Opatija, Croatia	
Win	9–3	Lukasz Jurkowski	Decision (split)	Sukosan Fight Night	September 9, 2006	2	1:41	Sukošan, Croatia	
Win	8–3	Jure Lucic	Submission (armbar)	Ultimate Nokaut 4	March 17, 2006	1	3:19	Karlovac, Croatia	
Win	7–3	Ivan Bacic	Submission (rear-naked choke)	Ultimate Nokaut 3	December 17, 2005	1	0:59	Rijeka, Croatia	
Loss	6–3	Lukasz Jurkowski	TKO (corner stoppage)	KSW IV: Konfrontacja	September 10, 2005	2	5:00	Warsaw, Poland	
Win	6–2	Branislav Zeman	Submission (rear-naked choke)	Ultimate Nokaut 2	July 29, 2005	2	2:49	Zadar, Croatia	
Loss	5–2	Miodrag Petkovic	TKO (punches)	Ultimate Nokaut 1	March 11, 2005	2	4:51	Karlovac, Croatia	
Win	5–1	Peter Cakic	TKO (punches and elbows)	Trboulje 2: Croatia vs Slovenia	February 12, 2005	1	2:25	Trbovlje, Slovenia	
Loss	4–1	Miodrag Petkovic	KO (punches)	Ultimate Fight Dubravc	April 4, 2004	2	3:21	Zagreb, Croatia	
Win	4–0	Andre Castro	KO (knee)	DF: Durata World Grand Prix 1	May 3, 2003	1	2:00	Zagreb, Croatia	
Win	3–0	Matthias Riccio	TKO (doctor stoppage)	DF: Durata World Grand Prix 1	May 3, 2003	1	4:00	Zagreb, Croatia	
Win	2–0	Pavel Botka	TKO (punches)	DF: Durata World Grand Prix 1	May 3, 2003	1	4:00	Zagreb, Croatia	
Win	1–0	Nik Peric	TKO (knees)	Strabag Free Fight	February 9, 2003	1	1:33	Rijeka, Croatia	
