= UFC Fight Night: Hunt vs. Bigfoot =

UFC mixed martial arts event in 2013

- The poster for UFC Fight Night: Hunt vs. Bigfoot
- Promotion: Ultimate Fighting Championship
- Date: December 7, 2013
- Venue: Brisbane Entertainment Centre
- City: Brisbane, Australia
- Attendance: 11,393
- Total gate: $1.785 million

Event chronology
The Ultimate Fighter: Team Rousey vs. Team Tate Finale	UFC Fight Night: Hunt vs. Bigfoot	UFC on Fox: Johnson vs. Benavidez 2

UFC Fight Night: Hunt vs. Bigfoot (also known as UFC Fight Night 33) was a mixed martial arts event held on December 7, 2013, at the Brisbane Entertainment Centre in Brisbane, Australia. The event was broadcast live on Fox Sports 1.

== Background ==
The event was the first the UFC has hosted in Brisbane. Overall, it was the fifth UFC event to be held in Australia.

The card was headlined by a heavyweight bout between Mark Hunt and Antônio Silva. The main event ended in a rare majority draw decision; one judge scoring the fight 48–47 for Mark Hunt, while the other two saw it a 47–47 draw. Post-fight, UFC President Dana White said that the bout had earned Fight of the Night honors.

Subsequently, Silva failed a post-fight test for elevated testosterone (he had been undergoing UFC-approved testosterone replacement therapy). Silva was suspended for nine months, retroactive to the date of the fight. Due to Silva's positive test, Hunt was given the total of $100,000 from the Fight of the Night bonus award. For Hunt the bout result remains a "draw" on his official record, while in Silva's case it was overturned to a no-contest.

Brian Melancon was expected to face Robert Whittaker at the event. However, Melancon pulled out of the bout and subsequently announced his retirement due to renal stress. As a result, Whittaker was removed from the card as well.

Mitch Gagnon was expected to face Alex Caceres at the event. However, the bout was cancelled during the week leading up to the event due to an alleged visa issue for Gagnon, restricting his entry to Australia.

== Results ==
Main Card (Fox Sports 1)
Weight class				Method	Round	Time	Notes
Heavyweight	Mark Hunt	vs.	Antônio Silva	Draw (majority) (48–47, 47–47, 47–47)	5	5:00	(Note: Silva tested positive for elevated levels of testosterone after the fight. His result was converted to a No Contest, while Hunt's stayed as a draw.)
Light Heavyweight	Maurício Rua	def.	James Te Huna	KO (punch)	1	1:03
Light Heavyweight	Ryan Bader	def.	Anthony Perosh	Decision (unanimous) (30–27, 30–27, 30–26)	3	5:00
Heavyweight	Soa Palelei	def.	Pat Barry	KO (punches)	1	2:09
Middleweight	Clint Hester	def.	Dylan Andrews	TKO (doctor stoppage)	2	5:00
Women's Bantamweight	Bethe Correia	def.	Julie Kedzie	Decision (split) (29–28, 28–29, 29–28)	3	5:00
Preliminary card (Fox Sports 2)
Bantamweight	Takeya Mizugaki	def.	Nam Phan	Decision (unanimous) (29–28, 29–28, 30–28)	3	5:00
Middleweight	Caio Magalhães	def.	Nick Ring	Decision (unanimous) (29–28, 29–28, 29–28)	3	5:00
Flyweight	Justin Scoggins	def.	Richie Vaculik	TKO (punches)	1	4:43
Middleweight	Krzysztof Jotko	def.	Bruno Santos	Decision (unanimous) (29–28, 29–28, 30–27)	3	5:00
Preliminary card (Online)
Welterweight	Alex Garcia	def.	Ben Wall	KO (punches)	1	0:43

== Bonus awards ==
The following fighters received $50,000 bonuses. As Silva failed his post-fight drug test, his bonus share was taken back by the UFC and awarded to Hunt who received the full $170,000.

- Fight of The Night: Mark Hunt vs. Antonio Silva
- Knockout of The Night: Maurício Rua
- Submission of the Night: Not awarded as no matches ended by submission.

== See also ==
- 2013 in UFC
- List of UFC events
- Mixed martial arts in Australia
