= Anthony Perosh =

Australian mixed martial arts fighter

- Born: 5 October 1972 (age 54); Sydney, Australia
- Other names: The Hippo; Don Flamingo
- Nationality: Australian; Croatian
- Height: 6 ft 3 in (1.91 m)
- Weight: 265 lb (120 kg; 18 st 13 lb)
- Division: Light heavyweight (205 lb) (2003–2006, 2007–2010, 2011–2016); Heavyweight (265 lb) (2006, 2010)
- Reach: 75 in (191 cm)
- Style: Brazilian Jiu-Jitsu
- Fighting out of: Sydney
- Team: Sinosic/Perosh Martial Arts
- Rank: 5th Degree Black Belt in Brazilian Jiu-Jitsu under Carlos Machado; Black belt in Kempo Karate; Black prajied in Muay Thai
- Years active: 2003–2016 (MMA)

Mixed martial arts record
- Total: 25
- Wins: 15
- By knockout: 5
- By submission: 10
- Losses: 10
- By knockout: 7
- By decision: 3

Other information
- Mixed martial arts record from Sherdog

Anthony Perosh (born 5 October 1972) is a retired Australian professional mixed martial artist who competed in the Light Heavyweight division of the Ultimate Fighting Championship.

== Background ==
Perosh was born and raised in Sydney, Australia and is of Croatian descent, as both of his parents are Croatian immigrants. Perosh began training in martial arts while doing security work to help pay for college tuition.

The training would help him in working security and he began his training in 1995 with Paul Zadro, when he was 23 years old. This original training was in Kempo Karate and Muay Thai, before he learned about Brazilian jiu-jitsu. In 1997 Perosh moved to Dallas, Texas to train with Carlos Machado (A World BJJ Champion) for over two years.

In 2003, Machado presented Perosh with a black belt in Machado Brazilian jiu-jitsu. Perosh is now a fifth-degree black belt in Brazilian jiu-jitsu, still under Machado. Perosh trained to compete in mixed martial arts after he received his black belt when he was 31 years old.

== Mixed martial arts career ==
=== Early career ===
Perosh made his professional mixed martial arts debut on 29 November 2003 defeating Api Hemara by first-round rear-naked choke submission. Perosh went on to fight two more times that night, winning both bouts by submission. He was invited to the UFC after compiling a 5–1 record with his only loss coming to 11–0 Sam Nest, by the way of decision.

=== Ultimate Fighting Championship ===
His UFC debut came not only against a fellow ADCC Submission Wrestling World Championship grappler, but against an ADCC Champion Jeff Monson at UFC 61. With both Monson and Perosh's Brazilian jiu-jitsu skills being cancelled out, the fight saw Monson instead win by technical knockout that subsequently led to a fight with Tim Sylvia for the UFC Heavyweight Championship.

His next fight came against Christian Wellisch at UFC 66 in a bloody brawl that saw both fighters knock each other down along with Perosh earning more takedowns while Wellisch landed more strikes. The win could have gone to either fighter, but the judges gave it unanimously to Wellisch. Perosh was released from the UFC following the fight.

=== Post-UFC ===
On 22 May 2009, Perosh won the quarter-final match against Nate Carey at CFC 8. He also won the semi-final match against Dave Frendin at CFC 9 on 11 July 2009. On 21 August 2009, Perosh was defeated by future UFC veteran James Te-Huna in the finals, at CFC 10. Te-Huna controversially stomped on Perosh when he was down at the end of the fight but was not given a punishment.

=== Return to Ultimate Fighting Championship ===
At UFC 110, the UFC's debut event in Australia on 20 February 2010, Perosh made his return to the UFC filling in as a late replacement for Ben Rothwell against legendary kickboxer and former 2006 Pride World Grand Prix Openweight Champion Mirko Cro Cop on a mere two days notice. Doctors called an end to the fight with Cro Cop at the end of the second round, as Perosh was bleeding from a cut sustained midway through the 2nd round by a vicious elbow from his opponent.

Although he lost, Perosh was given a four-fight contract with the UFC for stepping in on late notice against such a great opponent. On 27 March 2010, Perosh announced he would be undergoing knee surgery in the coming weeks and that he hoped that his next fight in the UFC would take place sometime in September 2010.

In his light heavyweight debut at UFC 127, Perosh quickly defeated English fighter Tom Blackledge to finally capture his first win in the UFC. He won the fight by rear-naked choke submission at 2:45 of the first round in front of his hometown crowd in Sydney, Australia; he stated post-fight that he feels much stronger at light heavyweight and would like to see how far he can go in his new weight class.

Perosh was scheduled to face Krzysztof Soszynski on 11 June 2011 at UFC 131. However, Perosh was forced from the bout with an eye injury and was replaced by Igor Pokrajac.

On 5 November 2011 at UFC 138 Perosh defeated Cyrille Diabaté via submission (rear-naked choke) at 3:09 of round two to gain his second UFC win in succession.

Perosh next faced promotional newcomer Nick Penner on 3 March 2012 at UFC on FX 2. He won the fight via TKO in the first round.

Perosh faced Ryan Jimmo on 21 July 2012 at UFC 149, losing via KO in 7 seconds.

Perosh was expected to face Joey Beltran on 15 December 2012 at UFC on FX 6. However, Perosh was forced from the bout with a toe injury and replaced by Igor Pokrajac.

In his sixth fight for the promotion since his return, Perosh faced Vinny Magalhães on 3 August 2013 at UFC 163. He won the fight via knockout just 10 seconds in the first round. This earned Perosh his first Knockout of the Night bonus award.

Perosh faced Ryan Bader on 7 December 2013 at UFC Fight Night 33. He lost the fight via unanimous decision (30–27, 30–27, and 30–26).

Perosh was expected to face Gian Villante on 28 June 2014 at UFC Fight Night 43. However, Perosh was forced out of the bout with an injury and was replaced by Sean O'Connell.

Perosh faced Guto Inocente at UFC Fight Night 55 on 8 November 2014. He won the fight via submission in the first round.

Perosh faced Sean O'Connell on 10 May 2015 at UFC Fight Night 65. He lost the fight via TKO in the first round.

Perosh faced Gian Villante on 15 November 2015 at UFC 193. He lost the fight via knockout in the first round.

Perosh announced his retirement from active competition in January 2016.

== Personal life ==
Perosh previously ran Sinosic Perosh Martial Arts (SPMA), with his business and training partner, former UFC veteran Elvis Sinosic in Sydney. Perosh currently runs Team Perosh Mixed Martial Arts which was established in late 2017, a martial arts school located in Sydney, Australia teaching Brazilian jiu-jitsu, Muay Thai, kickboxing, mixed martial arts, and wrestling. Both Instructors decided to open their Gyms after they agreed that one instructor should be at one location to pay closer attention to their students.

His nickname, "The Hippo," derived from his specific jiu-jitsu game; his use of pressure from the top position made his training partners frustrated and say: "Get off me you hippo!".

== Championships and accomplishments ==
=== Mixed martial arts ===
- Cage Fighting Championships
  - CFC Light Heavyweight Tournament Runner Up
- Ultimate Fighting Championship
  - Knockout of the Night (One time)

=== Grappling and Brazilian jiu-jitsu ===
- World Jiu-Jitsu Championship
  - 1999 World Jiu-Jitsu Championship Bronze Medalist
  - 2003 World Jiu-Jitsu Championship Bronze Medalist
- Pan American Championship
  - 2000 Pan American Silver Medalist
- ADCC Submission Wrestling World Championship
  - 5X ADCC World Championship Qualifier
  - ADCC 2009 South Pacific Champion
- Australian National Brazilian Jiu-Jitsu Championships
  - 10X Australian National Brazilian Jiu-Jitsu Champion

== Mixed martial arts record ==
Professional record breakdown
25 matches	15 wins	10 losses
By knockout	5	7
By submission	10	0
By decision	0	3

Res.	Record	Opponent	Method	Event	Date	Round	Time	Location	Notes
Loss	15–10	Gian Villante	KO (punch)	UFC 193	15 November 2015	1	2:56	Melbourne, Australia	
Loss	15–9	Sean O'Connell	TKO (punches)	UFC Fight Night: Miocic vs. Hunt	10 May 2015	1	0:56	Adelaide, Australia	
Win	15–8	Guto Inocente	Submission (rear-naked choke)	UFC Fight Night: Rockhold vs. Bisping	8 November 2014	1	3:46	Sydney, Australia	
Loss	14–8	Ryan Bader	Decision (unanimous)	UFC Fight Night: Hunt vs. Bigfoot	7 December 2013	3	5:00	Brisbane, Australia	
Win	14–7	Vinny Magalhães	KO (punches)	UFC 163	3 August 2013	1	0:14	Rio de Janeiro, Brazil	Knockout of the Night.
Loss	13–7	Ryan Jimmo	KO (punch)	UFC 149	21 July 2012	1	0:07	Calgary, Alberta, Canada	
Win	13–6	Nick Penner	TKO (punches)	UFC on FX: Alves vs. Kampmann	3 March 2012	1	4:59	Sydney, Australia	
Win	12–6	Cyrille Diabaté	Submission (rear-naked choke)	UFC 138	5 November 2011	2	3:09	Birmingham, England	
Win	11–6	Tom Blackledge	Submission (rear-naked choke)	UFC 127	27 February 2011	1	2:45	Sydney, Australia	
Loss	10–6	Mirko Cro Cop	TKO (doctor stoppage)	UFC 110	21 February 2010	2	5:00	Sydney, Australia	Heavyweight bout.
Win	10–5	Kym Robinson	TKO (punches)	Rize 3: Ascension	8 November 2009	1	N/A	Brisbane, Australia	
Loss	9–5	James Te Huna	KO (punches)	CFC 10: Light Heavyweight Grand Prix Finals	21 August 2009	1	2:21	Sydney, Australia	CFC Light Heavyweight Tournament Final.
Win	9–4	David Frendin	Submission (knees)	CFC 9: Fighters Paradise	11 July 2009	1	2:45	Carrara, Australia	CFC Light Heavyweight Tournament Semi-final.
Win	8–4	Nate Carey	TKO (punches)	CFC 8: Light Heavyweight Grand Prix	22 May 2009	1	4:16	Sydney, Australia	CFC Light Heavyweight Tournament Quarterfinal.
Win	7–4	Bryan Harper	Submission (rear-naked choke)	CFC 6: Eliminator	8 November 2008	2	4:04	Sydney, Australia	
Loss	6–4	Moise Rimbon	KO (flying knee)	Cage Fighting Championships 3	15 February 2008	1	4:11	Sydney, Australia	
Win	6–3	Carlo Lattore	TKO (punches)	Cage Fighting Championships 2	23 November 2007	1	4:31	Sydney, Australia	
Loss	5–3	Christian Wellisch	Decision (unanimous)	UFC 66	30 December 2006	3	5:00	Las Vegas, Nevada, United States	Heavyweight bout.
Loss	5–2	Jeff Monson	TKO (punches)	UFC 61	8 July 2006	1	2:42	Las Vegas, Nevada, United States	Heavyweight bout.
Win	5–1	Ross Dallow	Submission (rear-naked choke)	Warriors Realm 5	25 February 2006	1	2:25	Bokarina, Australia	
Win	4–1	Matt Foki	Submission (arm-triangle choke)	Spartan Reality Fight 10	31 July 2004	1	3:43	Gold Coast, Australia	
Loss	3–1	Sam Nest	Decision (unanimous)	Shooto Australia: NHB	20 May 2004	3	5:00	Melbourne, Australia	
Win	3–0	David Frendin	Submission (choke)	Spartan Reality Fight 8	29 November 2003	1	2:26	Gold Coast, Australia	
Win	2–0	Mal Foki	Submission (punches)	Spartan Reality Fight 8	29 November 2003	1	3:31	Gold Coast, Australia	
Win	1–0	Api Hemara	Submission (rear-naked choke)	Spartan Reality Fight 8	29 November 2003	1	1:13	Gold Coast, Australia	

== See also ==
- List of current UFC fighters
- List of male mixed martial artists
