= Ryan Bader =

American mixed martial arts fighter

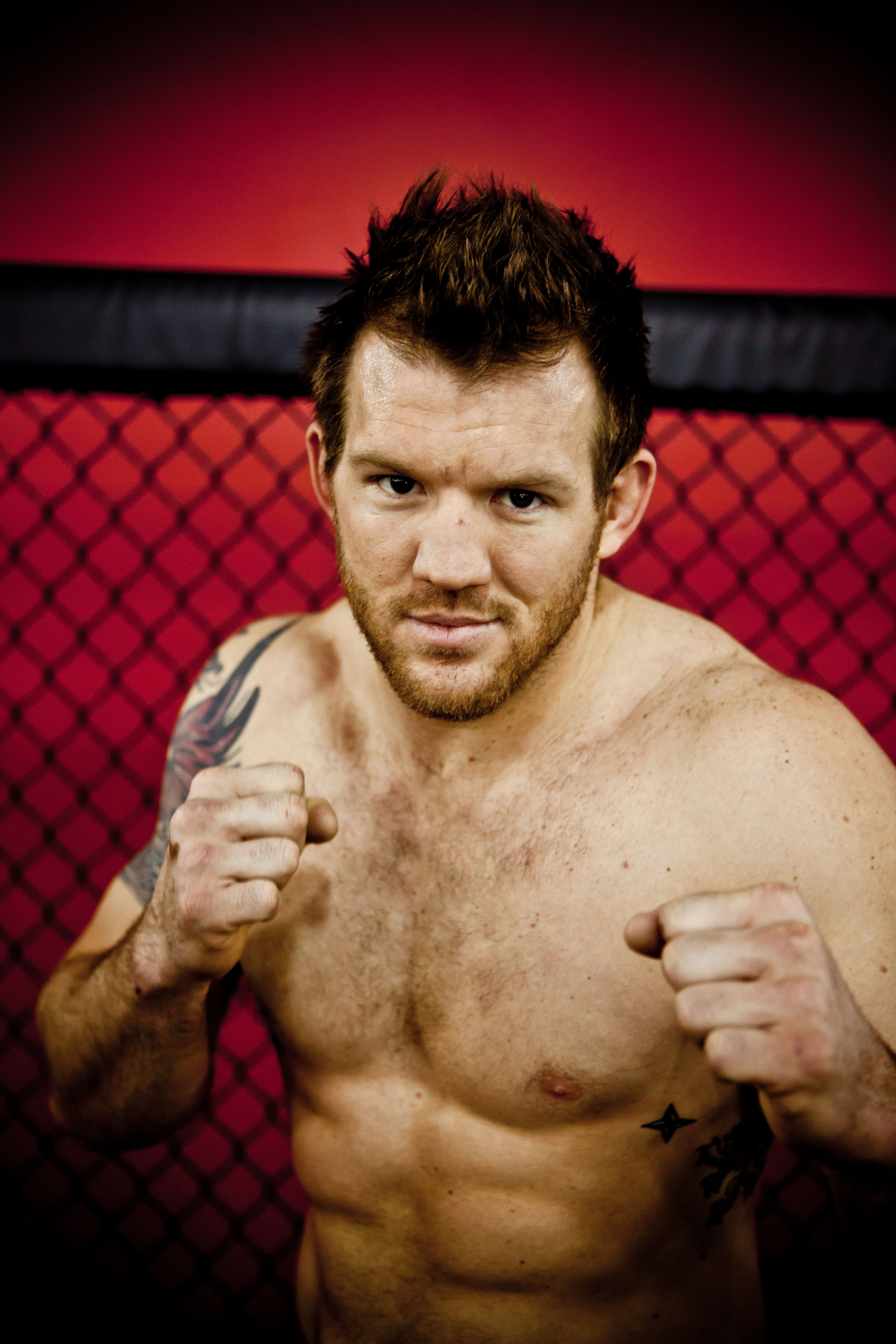
- Bader in 2011
- Born: June 7, 1983 (age 43); Reno, Nevada, U.S.
- Other names: Darth
- Height: 6 ft 2 in (188 cm)
- Weight: 232 lb (105 kg; 16 st 8 lb)
- Division: Light Heavyweight (2007–2021); Heavyweight (2018–present)
- Reach: 74 in (188 cm)
- Stance: Orthodox
- Fighting out of: Chandler, Arizona, U.S.
- Team: Arizona Combat Sports (2007–2010); Power MMA Team (2010–present)
- Rank: Black belt in Brazilian jiu-jitsu under Jair Lourenço Gurgel
- Wrestling: NCAA Division I Wrestling
- Years active: 2007–present

Mixed martial arts record
- Total: 40
- Wins: 31
- By knockout: 13
- By submission: 3
- By decision: 15
- Losses: 8
- By knockout: 6
- By submission: 2
- No contests: 1

Other information
- University: Arizona State University
- Spouse: Daisy Bader (m. 2010)
- Website: ryanbader.com
- Mixed martial arts record from Sherdog
Medal record
Men's collegiate wrestling
Representing the Arizona State Sun Devils
Pac-10 Championships
Gold medal – first place	2003 Boise	197 lb
Gold medal – first place	2004 Fargo	197 lb
Gold medal – first place	2006 Fullerton	197 lb

Ryan Bader (/ˈbeɪdər/ BAY-dər; born June 7, 1983) is an American mixed martial artist and actor who competes in the Heavyweight division of RIZIN. He previously competed for Bellator MMA where he was the Bellator Heavyweight Champion, and still holds the record for the longest continuous winning streak of any Bellator Champion. He is also the former Bellator Light Heavyweight Champion, and the winner of the 2018 Bellator Heavyweight World Grand Prix Tournament. At Bellator 214, Bader became the first fighter in Bellator history to become champion in two weight divisions simultaneously. Prior to signing with Bellator, Bader competed for the Ultimate Fighting Championship (UFC) in the Light Heavyweight division and he was a cast member and winner of The Ultimate Fighter: Team Nogueira vs. Team Mir. In the 2025 movie The Smashing Machine, Bader plays MMA fighter Mark Coleman.

== Early life and education ==
Ryan Bader was born in Reno, Nevada and started wrestling at the age of seven. He entered mixed martial arts after a successful career in amateur wrestling. He attended Robert McQueen High School in Reno, where he won two Nevada state championships and was ranked as high as fourth in the country for wrestling. In football, Bader was the 2001 Nevada Defensive Player of the Year and helped the McQueen Lancers win the Nevada state championship title.

== Career ==
=== Collegiate wrestling ===
Bader attended Arizona State University on a wrestling scholarship, where he was college teammates with former UFC Heavyweight Champion Cain Velasquez and CB Dollaway. While attending ASU, Bader was a three-time Pac-10 Champion, winning titles in 2003, 2004, and 2006. He was also a two-time NCAA All-American, placing fourth in 2004 as a sophomore and seventh in 2006 as a senior at the NCAA national tournament. From 2003 to 2005, Bader compiled a collegiate wrestling record of 88 wins and 34 losses. He began training at Arizona Combat Sports in early 2007.

=== The Ultimate Fighter (2008) ===
Bader's UFC career began as a contestant on season 8 of The Ultimate Fighter. Bader, the first light heavyweight selected by coach Antônio Rodrigo Nogueira, went on to win his first three fights on the show to fight with Vinicius Magalhães on December 13, 2008, at The Ultimate Fighter 8 Finale.

At the finale, Bader defeated Magalhães by way of a quick, first-round knockout, earning the title of "The Ultimate Fighter" and winning the traditional "six-figure UFC contract". An overhand right dropped Magalhães, and Bader followed up with strikes on the ground to take the win, less than halfway through the first round.

=== Ultimate Fighting Championship (2009–2011) ===
Bader's first post-TUF fight was at UFC Fight Night 18 against Carmelo Marrero, whom he defeated via unanimous decision, scoring 30–27 on all three judges' scorecards. During the match, Bader tore his medial collateral ligament and posterior cruciate ligament, which kept him sidelined until the next fall.

Shortly after the Marrero fight, Bader appeared alongside fellow Ultimate Fighter 8 winner Efraín Escudero in the UFC's sixth video game, UFC 2009 Undisputed. He and Escudero were available through a special code obtained by pre-ordering the game from GameStop. On September 10, 2009, he and Escudero were made available for download on PlayStation Network and Xbox 360 Marketplace.

Bader returned against Eric Schafer on October 24, 2009, at UFC 104. The fight was mainly dominated by Bader, who scored with a powerful attack of combinations standing and controlled the grappling, en route a unanimous decision victory (30–27, 29–26, and 30–27).

Next for Bader was Keith Jardine, who he fought on February 21, 2010, at the UFC's debut effort in Australia, UFC 110. Bader scored a sharp jab on the tiring Jardine, which set up a flying knee to the chest and a left hook at 2:10 of the third round to secure a KO victory for Bader.

Along with Jesse Forbes, CB Dollaway, Eric Larkin and Aaron Simpson, Bader left Arizona Combat Sports to train at their newly opened gym Power MMA And Fitness.

Bader moved his UFC record to 5–0 at the expense of Antônio Rogério Nogueira at UFC 119, controlling him most of the fight with his wrestling and using his jab and short combinations to stop much of Nogueira's offense. All three judges scored the fight 30–27 for Bader.

=== First MMA losses (2011–2013) ===
Four months after his victory over Nogueira, Bader fought fellow rising prospect Jon Jones on February 5, 2011, at UFC 126, where he received the first loss of his MMA career after tapping out to a modified guillotine choke in the second round.

In a massive upset, Bader lost to Tito Ortiz on July 2, 2011, at UFC 132 by an arm-in guillotine choke which Ortiz secured following a knockdown of Bader.

Bader then faced Jason Brilz on November 19, 2011, at UFC 139. He defeated Brilz at 1:17 of the first round via KO, landing a straight right behind Brilz's ear causing him to immediately fall to the mat face-first.

Bader next faced former Light Heavyweight champion Quinton Jackson on February 26, 2012, at UFC 144. Jackson weighed in over the Light Heavyweight weight allowance of 206 lbs by 5 lbs, weighing in at 211 lbs. Bader accepted the fight at a catchweight and received 20% of Jackson's purse. Bader won via unanimous decision, with all three judges scoring the fight 30–27.

Bader faced Lyoto Machida on August 4, 2012, at UFC on Fox: Shogun vs. Vera. He was defeated via KO at 1:32 in the second round, after rushing in and being caught with a punch.

Bader faced former title challenger Vladimir Matyushenko on January 26, 2013, at UFC on Fox 6. He won the fight via guillotine choke submission at just 50 seconds of the first round, earning his first Submission of the Night honors, and also having the fastest UFC Light Heavyweight submission.

Bader was expected to face Glover Teixeira on May 25, 2013, at UFC 160. However, Bader pulled out of the bout citing an injury and was replaced by James Te-Huna.

The bout with Teixeira eventually took place on September 4, 2013, in the main event at UFC Fight Night 28. Despite dropping Teixeira early in the first round, Bader lost the fight via TKO in the first round.

Bader faced Anthony Perosh on December 7, 2013, at UFC Fight Night 33. He won the fight via unanimous decision (30–27, 30–27, and 30–26). Bader dominated Perosh all 15 minutes of the three round contest using his superior wrestling.

=== Winning streaks at UFC (2014–2016) ===
Bader faced Rafael Cavalcante on June 14, 2014, at UFC 174. He won the fight via unanimous decision. Bader's wrestling was displayed once again, controlling Feijão the majority of the bout.

Bader faced Ovince St. Preux on August 16, 2014, at UFC Fight Night: Bader vs. St. Preux. He won the fight via unanimous decision.

Bader fought Phil Davis on January 24, 2015, at UFC on Fox 14. He won the fight by split decision.

Bader was expected to face Daniel Cormier on June 6, 2015, at UFC Fight Night 68. However, on April 28, 2015 it was announced that Cormier had been removed from the fight in favor of a matchup with Anthony Johnson on May 23, 2015 at UFC 187.

Bader faced Rashad Evans on October 3, 2015, at UFC 192. He won the fight via unanimous decision.

Bader faced Anthony Johnson in the main event on January 30, 2016, at UFC on Fox 18. His winning streak was interrupted, as he lost the fight via knockout in the first round.

Bader next faced Ilir Latifi on September 3, 2016, at UFC Fight Night 93. He won the fight via knockout in the second round and was awarded a Performance of the Night bonus.

Bader faced Antônio Rogério Nogueira in a rematch on November 19, 2016, in the main event at UFC Fight Night 100. He won the fight by TKO in the third round with ground and pound after dominating Nogueira on the mat. Bader's fight against Nogueira was the last on his UFC contract and afterward he was a free agent.

=== Bellator MMA (2017–2024) ===
==== Double champion (2017–2020) ====
On Ariel Helwani's podcast, the MMA Hour, Bader stated that he has a Bellator MMA contract on hand, that negotiations are in process, and that the UFC has the right to match the Bellator offer. If the UFC chose not to match then his desire would be for an immediate fight against the current Bellator Light Heavyweight Champion Phil Davis, whom he had beaten in the UFC. On March 21, 2017, Bader announced that the UFC had not sought to match Bellator's offer and that he had officially signed a six-fight deal with Bellator MMA.

Bader was officially unveiled as a fighter for the company at Bellator 175. After the main event, Bader entered the cage and it was announced he would face Muhammed Lawal at Bellator 180 on June 24, 2017. However, Lawal pulled out of the fight and Bader faced Bellator Light Heavyweight champion Phil Davis in a rematch. Bader and Davis first met at UFC on Fox: Gustafsson vs. Johnson on January 24, 2015, with Bader winning by split decision. Bader won the rematch again by split decision to become the new Light Heavyweight champion.

In his first title defense, Bader faced Linton Vassell at Bellator 186 on November 3, 2017. He won the fight via TKO in the second round.

Bader faced Muhammed Lawal in the Bellator Heavyweight Grand Prix for the Bellator Heavyweight championship at Bellator 199 on May 12, 2018. He won the fight via TKO 15 seconds into the first round.

Bader faced Matt Mitrione in the semi-finals at Bellator 207 on October 12, 2018. He won the fight via unanimous decision.

In the final, Bader faced Fedor Emelianenko for the vacant Bellator Heavyweight World Championship in the main event at Bellator 214 on January 26, 2019. Bader claimed the title by winning via knockout 35 seconds into the first round, thus becoming the first simultaneous two-weight champion in Bellator history.

In April 2019, Bader signed an exclusive, multi-year and six-fight contract with Bellator.

On July 11, 2019, it was announced that Bader is set to make his first heavyweight title defense against Cheick Kongo. This bout served as the headliner of Bellator 226 on September 7. The bout ended in a no contest at 3:52 of the first round when Bader landed an accidental eye poke on Kongo that rendered him unable to continue, with Bader retaining his title.

Bader was signed to defend his light heavyweight title against Vadim Nemkov at Bellator 242 on May 9, 2020. However, it was later announced that Bellator 242 and Bader's bout against Nemkov had been postponed due to the COVID-19 pandemic. The title bout with Nemkov was rescheduled and took place on August 21 at Bellator 244. Bader lost the bout via second-round technical knockout.

==== Light Heavyweight World Grand Prix ====
On February 9, 2021, it was announced that Bader would be participating in the Bellator Light Heavyweight World Grand Prix. He faced Lyoto Machida in the quarterfinal round. This was a rematch of their August 2012 bout, which saw Machida win via second-round knockout. The bout took place at Bellator 256 on April 9, 2021. After Machida showed early success in the first two rounds on the feet via kicks, Bader soon controlled the rest of the bout on the ground, winning via a unanimous decision.

In the semi-finals of the Grand Prix, Bader faced Corey Anderson on October 16, 2021 at Bellator 268. He lost the fight via technical knockout less than a minute into round one.

==== Heavyweight reign ====
Bader defended his heavyweight title against Bellator Interim Heavyweight World Champion Valentin Moldavsky on January 29, 2022 at Bellator 273. He won the close bout via unanimous decision. 7 out of 11 media scores gave it to Moldavsky.

As the first bout of his new four-fight contract, Bader defended his title in a rematch against Cheick Kongo on May 6, 2022 at Bellator 280. He won the fight via unanimous decision.

Bader defended his title in a rematch against Fedor Emelianenko on February 4, 2023 at Bellator 290. He won the bout via ground and pound TKO in the first round.

Bader was set to defend his title in a rematch against Linton Vassell on October 7, 2023 at Bellator 300. However, Vassell withdrew a few days before the event due to illness and the bout was cancelled.

==== 2024 ====
Bader faced 2023 PFL Heavyweight champion Renan Ferreira in a three round non-title crossover fight at PFL vs. Bellator, on February 24, 2024. He lost the bout via knockout just twenty-one seconds into the first round.

=== Rizin Fighting Federation (2025–present) ===
==== 2025 ====
On March 26, 2025, it was announced that Bader had parted ways with PFL.

Bader was scheduled to face 2025 Rizin Heavyweight Grand Prix winner Alexander Soldatkin for the inaugural Rizin Heavyweight Championship at Rizin: Shiwasu no Cho Tsuwamono Matsuri on December 31, 2025. However, Bader withdrew due to multiple injuries in his hip and groin.

== Personal life ==
Bader and his wife Daisy have two sons and a daughter.

== Championships and accomplishments ==
=== Mixed martial arts ===
- Bellator MMA
  - Bellator Heavyweight World Championship (One time; final)
    - Three successful title defenses
    - Most successful consecutive heavyweight title defenses in Bellator MMA history (3)
  - Bellator Light Heavyweight World Championship (One time; former)
    - One successful title defense
  - Bellator MMA Heavyweight World Grand Prix winner
  - Second two-weight champion in Bellator MMA history
  - First ever simultaneous two-weight champion in Bellator MMA history
  - Only fighter in Bellator history to defend titles in two weight classes
- Ultimate Fighting Championship
  - The Ultimate Fighter 8 Light Heavyweight Tournament Winner
  - Submission of the Night (One time) vs. Vladimir Matyushenko
  - Performance of the Night (One time) vs. Ilir Latifi
  - Tied (Ovince Saint Preux) for third most wins in modern UFC Light Heavyweight division history (15)
  - Second most decision wins in UFC Light Heavyweight division history (9)
  - UFC.com Awards
    - 2010: Ranked #6 Upset of the Year vs. Antônio Rogério Nogueira
    - 2012: Ranked #2 Upset of the Year & Half-Year Awards: Biggest Upset of the 1HY vs. Quinton Jackson
- MMA Junkie
  - 2016 #5 Ranked Knockout of the Year vs. Ilir Latifi at UFC Fight Night: Arlovski vs. Barnett

=== Collegiate wrestling ===
- National Collegiate Athletic Association
  - NCAA Division I All-American out of Arizona State University (2004), (2006)
  - NCAA Division I 197 lb - 4th place out of Arizona State University (2004)
  - NCAA Division I 197 lb - 7th place out of Arizona State University (2006)
  - Pac-10 Conference Championship out of Arizona State University (2003), (2004), (2006)

== Mixed martial arts record ==
Professional record breakdown
40 matches	31 wins	8 losses
By knockout	13	6
By submission	3	2
By decision	15	0
No contests	1	

Res.	Record	Opponent	Method	Event	Date	Round	Time	Location	Notes
Loss	31–8 (1)	Renan Ferreira	TKO (punches)	PFL vs. Bellator	February 24, 2024	1	0:21	Riyadh, Saudi Arabia	
Win	31–7 (1)	Fedor Emelianenko	TKO (punches)	Bellator 290	February 4, 2023	1	2:30	Inglewood, California, United States	Defended the Bellator Heavyweight World Championship.
Win	30–7 (1)	Cheick Kongo	Decision (unanimous)	Bellator 280	May 6, 2022	5	5:00	Paris, France	Defended the Bellator Heavyweight World Championship.
Win	29–7 (1)	Valentin Moldavsky	Decision (unanimous)	Bellator 273	January 29, 2022	5	5:00	Phoenix, Arizona, United States	Return to Heavyweight. Defended and unified the Bellator Heavyweight World Championship.
Loss	28–7 (1)	Corey Anderson	TKO (punches)	Bellator 268	October 16, 2021	1	0:51	Phoenix, Arizona, United States	Bellator Light Heavyweight World Grand Prix Semifinal.
Win	28–6 (1)	Lyoto Machida	Decision (unanimous)	Bellator 256	April 9, 2021	5	5:00	Uncasville, Connecticut, United States	Bellator Light Heavyweight World Grand Prix Quarterfinal.
Loss	27–6 (1)	Vadim Nemkov	TKO (head kick and punches)	Bellator 244	August 21, 2020	2	3:02	Uncasville, Connecticut, United States	Return to Light Heavyweight. Lost the Bellator Light Heavyweight World Championship.
NC	27–5 (1)	Cheick Kongo	NC (accidental eye poke)	Bellator 226	September 7, 2019	1	3:52	San Jose, California, United States	Retained the Bellator Heavyweight World Championship. Accidental eye poke rendered Kongo unable to continue.
Win	27–5	Fedor Emelianenko	TKO (punches)	Bellator 214	January 26, 2019	1	0:35	Inglewood, California, United States	Won the Bellator Heavyweight World Grand Prix and the vacant Bellator Heavyweight World Championship.
Win	26–5	Matt Mitrione	Decision (unanimous)	Bellator 207	October 12, 2018	3	5:00	Uncasville, Connecticut, United States	Bellator Heavyweight World Grand Prix Semifinal.
Win	25–5	Muhammed Lawal	TKO (punches)	Bellator 199	May 12, 2018	1	0:15	San Jose, California, United States	Heavyweight debut. Bellator Heavyweight World Grand Prix Quarterfinal.
Win	24–5	Linton Vassell	TKO (punches)	Bellator 186	November 3, 2017	2	3:58	University Park, Pennsylvania, United States	Defended the Bellator Light Heavyweight World Championship.
Win	23–5	Phil Davis	Decision (split)	Bellator 180	June 24, 2017	5	5:00	New York City, New York, United States	Won the Bellator Light Heavyweight World Championship.
Win	22–5	Antônio Rogério Nogueira	TKO (punches)	UFC Fight Night: Bader vs. Nogueira 2	November 19, 2016	3	3:51	São Paulo, Brazil	
Win	21–5	Ilir Latifi	KO (knee)	UFC Fight Night: Arlovski vs. Barnett	September 3, 2016	2	2:06	Hamburg, Germany	Performance of the Night.
Loss	20–5	Anthony Johnson	KO (punches)	UFC on Fox: Johnson vs. Bader	January 30, 2016	1	1:26	Newark, New Jersey, United States	
Win	20–4	Rashad Evans	Decision (unanimous)	UFC 192	October 3, 2015	3	5:00	Houston, Texas, United States	
Win	19–4	Phil Davis	Decision (split)	UFC on Fox: Gustafsson vs. Johnson	January 24, 2015	3	5:00	Stockholm, Sweden	
Win	18–4	Ovince Saint Preux	Decision (unanimous)	UFC Fight Night: Bader vs. Saint Preux	August 16, 2014	5	5:00	Bangor, Maine, United States	
Win	17–4	Rafael Cavalcante	Decision (unanimous)	UFC 174	June 14, 2014	3	5:00	Vancouver, British Columbia, Canada	
Win	16–4	Anthony Perosh	Decision (unanimous)	UFC Fight Night: Hunt vs. Bigfoot	December 7, 2013	3	5:00	Brisbane, Australia	
Loss	15–4	Glover Teixeira	TKO (punches)	UFC Fight Night: Teixeira vs. Bader	September 4, 2013	1	2:55	Belo Horizonte, Brazil	
Win	15–3	Vladimir Matyushenko	Submission (guillotine choke)	UFC on Fox: Johnson vs. Dodson	January 26, 2013	1	0:50	Chicago, Illinois, United States	Submission of the Night.
Loss	14–3	Lyoto Machida	KO (punches)	UFC on Fox: Shogun vs. Vera	August 4, 2012	2	1:32	Los Angeles, California, United States	
Win	14–2	Quinton Jackson	Decision (unanimous)	UFC 144	February 26, 2012	3	5:00	Saitama, Japan	Catchweight (211 lbs) bout; Jackson missed weight.
Win	13–2	Jason Brilz	KO (punch)	UFC 139	November 19, 2011	1	1:17	San Jose, California, United States	
Loss	12–2	Tito Ortiz	Submission (guillotine choke)	UFC 132	July 2, 2011	1	1:56	Las Vegas, Nevada, United States	
Loss	12–1	Jon Jones	Submission (guillotine choke)	UFC 126	February 5, 2011	2	4:20	Las Vegas, Nevada, United States	
Win	12–0	Antônio Rogério Nogueira	Decision (unanimous)	UFC 119	September 25, 2010	3	5:00	Indianapolis, Indiana, United States	
Win	11–0	Keith Jardine	KO (punch)	UFC 110	February 21, 2010	3	2:10	Sydney, Australia	
Win	10–0	Eric Schafer	Decision (unanimous)	UFC 104	October 24, 2009	3	5:00	Los Angeles, California, United States	
Win	9–0	Carmelo Marrero	Decision (unanimous)	UFC Fight Night: Condit vs. Kampmann	April 1, 2009	3	5:00	Nashville, Tennessee, United States	
Win	8–0	Vinny Magalhães	TKO (punches)	The Ultimate Fighter: Team Nogueira vs. Team Mir Finale	December 13, 2008	1	2:18	Las Vegas, Nevada, United States	Won The Ultimate Fighter 8 Light Heavyweight Tournament.
Win	7–0	Buckley Acosta	Submission (arm-triangle choke)	Xtreme Cage Combat 6	April 5, 2008	1	0:47	Reno, Nevada, United States	
Win	6–0	Brad Peterson	Decision (unanimous)	International Fighting Organization: Fireworks in the Cage 4	December 28, 2007	3	5:00	Las Vegas, Nevada, United States	
Win	5–0	Ulises Cortez	KO (punches)	SE: Vale Tudo	October 27, 2007	1	N/A	Mexico	
Win	4–0	Dicky Chavez	TKO (punches)	KOTC: Unstoppable	September 15, 2007	1	0:41	San Carlos, Arizona, United States	
Win	3–0	Tim Peacock	TKO (punches)	Worldwide FC: Rumble in the Red Rocks	June 9, 2007	2	2:50	Camp Verde, Arizona, United States	
Win	2–0	David Baggett	Submission (rear-naked choke)	Proving Grounds 1	May 12, 2007	1	N/A	George Town, Cayman Islands	
Win	1–0	Dave Covello	TKO (submission to punches)	Worldwide FC: Desert Strom	March 31, 2007	1	2:21	Camp Verde, Arizona, United States	Light Heavyweight debut.

Exhibition record breakdown		
3 matches	3 wins	0 losses
By knockout	1	0
By submission	1	0
By decision	1	0

Res.	Record	Opponent	Method	Event	Date	Round	Time	Location	Notes
Win	3–0	Eliot Marshall	Decision (unanimous)	The Ultimate Fighter: Team Nogueira vs. Team Mir	June 25, 2008 (airdate)	2	5:00	Las Vegas, Nevada, United States	The Ultimate Fighter 8 semifinal round.
Win	2–0	Tom Lawlor	KO (punch)	The Ultimate Fighter: Team Nogueira vs. Team Mir	May 28, 2008 (airdate)	1	3:44	Las Vegas, Nevada, United States	The Ultimate Fighter 8 quarterfinal round.
Win	1–0	Kyle Kingsbury	Submission (arm-triangle choke)	The Ultimate Fighter: Team Nogueira vs. Team Mir	May 21, 2008 (airdate)	2	1:33	Las Vegas, Nevada, United States	The Ultimate Fighter 8 preliminary round.

== Pay-per-view bouts ==
No	Event	Fight	Date	Venue	City	PPV buys
1.	PFL vs. Bellator	Ferreira vs. Bader	February 24, 2024	Kingdom Arena	Riyadh, Saudi Arabia	Not Disclosed

== NCAA record ==
NCAA Championships Matches
Res.	Record	Opponent	Score	Date	Event
2006 NCAA Championships 7th at 197 lbs
Win	10-7	Wynn Michalak	5-3	March 17, 2006	2006 NCAA Division I Wrestling Championships
Loss	10-7	Joel Flaggert	4-9	March 17, 2006	2006 NCAA Division I Wrestling Championships
Win	10-6	Nathan Moore	6-4	March 17, 2006	2006 NCAA Division I Wrestling Championships
Loss	9-6	Chris Weidman	7-10	March 17, 2006	2006 NCAA Division I Wrestling Championships
Win	9-5	Tyrone Byrd	6-0	March 17, 2006	2006 NCAA Division I Wrestling Championships
Win	8-5	Bredan McLean	Fall	March 17, 2006	2006 NCAA Division I Wrestling Championships
2005 NCAA Championships at 197 lbs
Loss	7-5	Joel Flaggert	5-1	March 17, 2005	2005 NCAA Division I Wrestling Championships
Win	7-4	Joel Weimer	3-2	March 17, 2005	2005 NCAA Division I Wrestling Championships
Loss	6-4	Phil Davis	1-3	March 17, 2005	2005 NCAA Division I Wrestling Championships
Win	6-3	Tyrone Byrd	7-3	March 17, 2005	2005 NCAA Division I Wrestling Championships
2004 NCAA Championships 4th at 197 lbs
Loss	5-3	J.D. Bergman	4-5	March 20, 2004	2004 NCAA Division I Wrestling Championships
Win	5-3	Chris Skretkowicz	5-1	March 20, 2004	2004 NCAA Division I Wrestling Championships
Loss	4-3	Damion Hahn	1-2	March 20, 2004	2004 NCAA Division I Wrestling Championships
Win	4-2	B.J. Padden	5-3	March 20, 2004	2004 NCAA Division I Wrestling Championships
Win	3-2	Joel Weimer	4-1	March 20, 2004	2004 NCAA Division I Wrestling Championships
Win	2-2	Jeff Foust	7-0	March 20, 2004	2004 NCAA Division I Wrestling Championships
2003 NCAA Championships at 197 lbs
Loss	1-2	Matt Greenberg	Major 1-14	March 20, 2003	2003 NCAA Division I Wrestling Championships
Loss	1-1	Jon Trenge	Major 2-11	March 20, 2003	2003 NCAA Division I Wrestling Championships
Win	1-0	Adam Schaaf	OT 6-4	March 20, 2003	2003 NCAA Division I Wrestling Championships

== See also ==
- List of male mixed martial artists
- Double champions in MMA

Awards and achievements
Preceded by Phil Davis	6th Bellator Light Heavyweight World Champion; June 24, 2017 – August 21, 2020	Succeeded by Vadim Nemkov
Vacant Title last held by Vitaly Minakov	4th Bellator Heavyweight World Champion; January 26, 2019 – March 26, 2025; Released	Vacant
