= James Te Huna =

New Zealand mixed martial arts fighter

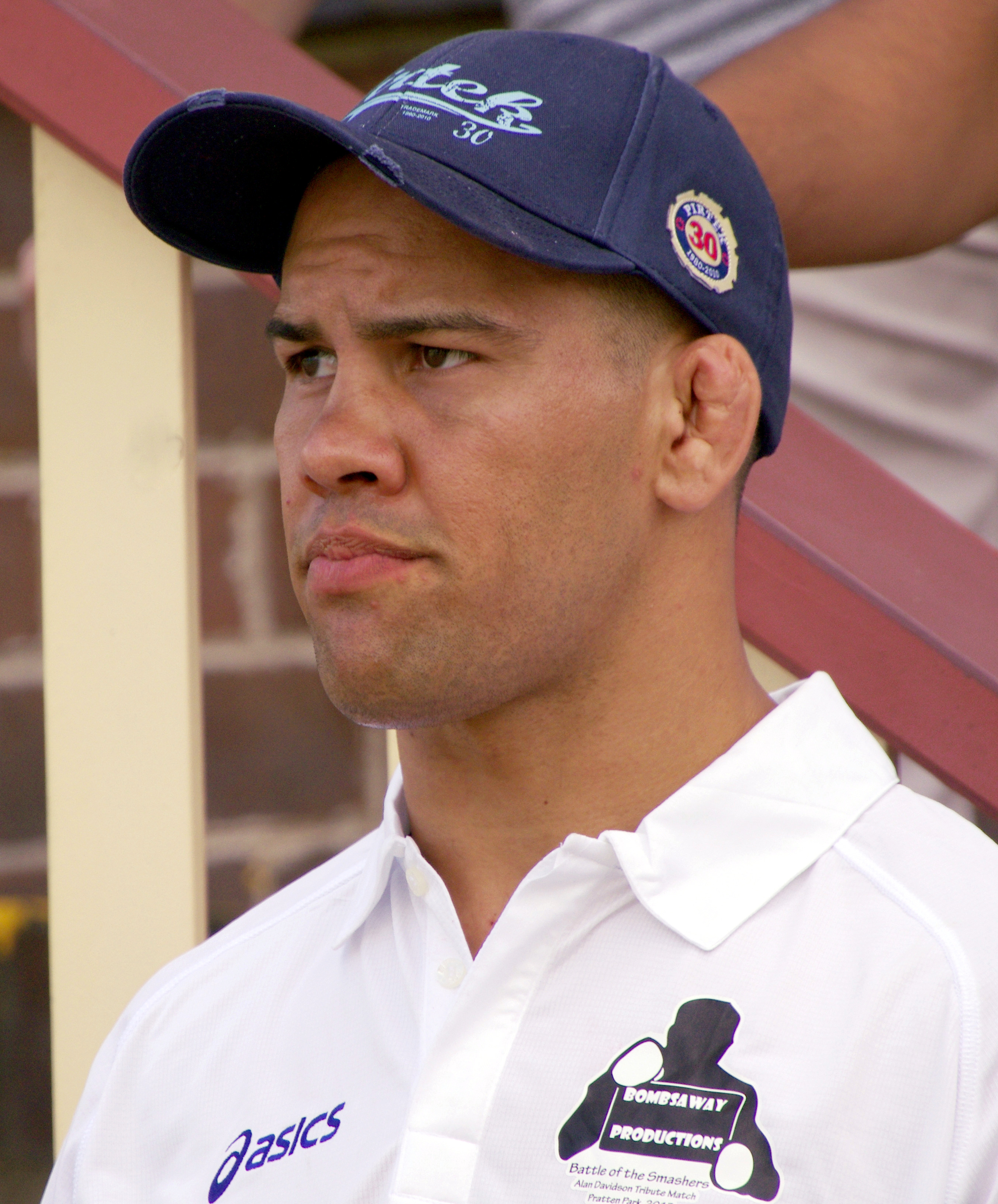
- Te Huna in 2014
- Born: 29 September 1981 (age 45); Darfield, New Zealand
- Height: 6 ft 1 in (185 cm)
- Weight: 185 lb (84 kg; 13 st 3 lb)
- Division: Middleweight; Light Heavyweight; Heavyweight
- Reach: 75 in (190 cm)
- Fighting out of: Sydney, Australia
- Years active: 2003–2016

Mixed martial arts record
- Total: 25
- Wins: 16
- By knockout: 10
- By submission: 3
- By decision: 3
- Losses: 9
- By knockout: 3
- By submission: 5
- By disqualification: 1

Other information
- Mixed martial arts record from Sherdog

James Te Huna (born 29 September 1981) is a New Zealand retired professional mixed martial artist, best known for competing in the Ultimate Fighting Championship. He was the first Australian-based fighter to win a UFC fight on Australian soil, and the first person to headline a UFC fight in New Zealand.

Te Huna is now a Rugby League contact wrestling coach who has already worked alongside several NRL clubs. He also founded New Wave Engage that provides Support Programs to vulnerable teens in Out-Of-Home Care (foster teenagers).

== Mixed martial arts career ==
=== Early career and background ===
Te Huna racked up victories on the local circuit, in Australia, as well as suffering a submission loss (via shoulder dislocation) to Bellator season one middleweight champion Hector Lombard.

Te Huna defeated veteran journeyman Antony Rea while competing for the Cage Fighting Championship promotion. He became the Cage Fighting Championship Light Heavyweight World Champion at CFC 10 by defeating Anthony Perosh by first-round KO. Te Huna was later sanctioned by the promotion for illegally stomping on Perosh after the referee had stopped the bout. Cage Fighting Championship promoter Luke Pezzutti issued the following statement concerning Te Huna's behaviour, "To Anthony Perosh and the supporters/ Fans of Cage Fighting Championship, we apologize and do not condone nor tolerate the un-sportsman like actions of James Te-Huna at the CFC 10 August 21 event where the referee Ivan Walton stepped in to stop the fight between James and Anthony, and as a result of his actions that evening he has been fined 20% of his fight purse and has offered to write a letter of apology to Anthony Perosh, CFC officials and the supporters of CFC. CFC officials will amend rules, regulations to further prevent this type of behavior from our athletes." A formal letter of apology was duly issued on Te Huna's behalf.

Te Huna escaped serious injuries after a twenty-foot shop glass panel fell on top of him while walking to training alongside a Sydney mall.

=== Ultimate Fighting Championship ===
Te Huna then signed a contract with the Ultimate Fighting Championship and made his debut at UFC 110 against Igor Pokrajac. Te Huna was victorious via a controversial TKO stoppage. The referee stopped the bout when he hit Pokrajac with nine consecutive punches, which he did with his broken arm.

His next fight was scheduled to be at UFC 120 against UFC newcomer Tom Blackledge, but Te Huna withdrew from the fight due to injury and was replaced by James McSweeney.

Te Huna made his return on 27 February 2011 at UFC 127 against Alexander Gustafsson, where was defeated by first-round submission due to a rear-naked choke. He donated his fight purse to the Christchurch earthquake victims, and the UFC matched his donation.

He faced Ricardo Romero on 24 September 2011 at UFC 135 and won by KO due to punches 47 seconds into the first round.

Te Huna next faced Aaron Rosa on 3 March 2012 at UFC on FX 2. He won by TKO in the first round.

He was expected to face UFC veteran Brandon Vera on 11 July 2012 at UFC on Fuel TV 4. However, Vera was tapped to fight Maurício Rua at UFC on Fox 4 and was replaced by returning veteran Joey Beltran. Te Huna knocked Beltran down once and had him rocked throughout the first round. Despite breaking bones in his left hand and left foot and having his endurance tested, Te Huna won the fight via unanimous decision (30–26, 30–27, 30–27).

Te Huna fought Ryan Jimmo on 16 February 2013 at UFC on Fuel TV: Barão vs. McDonald. He survived an early scare in round one after getting hit with a head kick. Te Huna then rebounded by controlling rounds two and three with his wrestling, winning via unanimous decision (29–27, 29–28, 29–28).

He next faced Glover Teixeira at UFC 160 on 25 May 2013, coming in as an injury replacement for Ryan Bader. He lost the fight via submission due to a guillotine choke in the first round.

Te Huna faced Maurício Rua on 7 December 2013 at UFC Fight Night 33. He lost the fight via knockout in the first round.

Following those two consecutive losses, Te Huna announced that he would drop down to middleweight for his future fights. He made his middleweight debut and faced Nate Marquardt in his home country of New Zealand on 28 June 2014 at UFC Fight Night: Te Huna vs. Marquardt. He lost the fight via first round armbar.

After being sidelined for all of 2015 due to a litany of injuries, Te Huna returned to face Steve Bossé on 20 March 2016 at UFC Fight Night 85. Te-Huna lost the bout via KO in the first round.

On 24 May 2016 Te Huna announced on both his Instagram and Twitter accounts that he would be retiring from mixed martial arts.

== Championships and accomplishments ==
- Ultimate Fighting Championship
  - First New Zealander to compete in the UFC
  - First New Zealander to Win a fight in the UFC
  - Fight of the Night (One time)
  - UFC.com Awards
    - 2012: Ranked #9 Fight of the Year vs. Joey Beltran
- Cage Fighting Championships
  - CFC Light Heavyweight World Championship (One time)
  - CFC Light Heavyweight Grand Prix Champion

== Mixed martial arts record ==
Professional record breakdown
25 matches	16 wins	9 losses
By knockout	10	3
By submission	3	5
By decision	3	0
By disqualification	0	1

Res.	Record	Opponent	Method	Event	Date	Round	Time	Location	Notes
Loss	16–9	Steve Bossé	KO (punch)	UFC Fight Night: Hunt vs. Mir	20 March 2016	1	0:52	Brisbane, Queensland, Australia	
Loss	16–8	Nate Marquardt	Submission (armbar)	UFC Fight Night: Te Huna vs. Marquardt	28 June 2014	1	4:34	Auckland, New Zealand	Middleweight bout.
Loss	16–7	Maurício Rua	KO (punch)	UFC Fight Night: Hunt vs. Bigfoot	7 December 2013	1	1:03	Brisbane, Queensland, Australia	
Loss	16–6	Glover Teixeira	Submission (guillotine choke)	UFC 160	25 May 2013	1	2:38	Las Vegas, Nevada, United States	
Win	16–5	Ryan Jimmo	Decision (unanimous)	UFC on Fuel TV: Barão vs. McDonald	16 February 2013	3	5:00	London, England	
Win	15–5	Joey Beltran	Decision (unanimous)	UFC on Fuel TV: Munoz vs. Weidman	11 July 2012	3	5:00	San Jose, California, United States	Fight of the Night.
Win	14–5	Aaron Rosa	TKO (punches)	UFC on FX: Alves vs. Kampmann	3 March 2012	1	2:08	Sydney, New South Wales, Australia	
Win	13–5	Ricardo Romero	KO (punches)	UFC 135	24 September 2011	1	0:47	Denver, Colorado, United States	
Loss	12–5	Alexander Gustafsson	Submission (rear-naked choke)	UFC 127	27 February 2011	1	4:27	Sydney, New South Wales, Australia	
Win	12–4	Igor Pokrajac	TKO (punches)	UFC 110	21 February 2010	3	3:26	Sydney, New South Wales, Australia	
Win	11–4	Anthony Perosh	KO (punches)	CFC 10: Light Heavyweight Grand Prix Finals	21 August 2009	1	2:21	Sydney, New South Wales, Australia	CFC Light Heavyweight Grand Prix Final.
Win	10–4	Priscus Fogagnolo	TKO (punches)	CFC 9: Fighters Paradise	11 July 2009	2	2:37	Gold Coast, Queensland, Australia	CFC Light Heavyweight Grand Prix Second Round.
Win	9–4	Antony Rea	TKO (punches)	CFC 8: Light Heavyweight Grand Prix	22 May 2009	1	1:52	Sydney, Australia	CFC Light Heavyweight Grand Prix First Round.
Win	8–4	David Gibb	TKO (punches)	XFC: Return of the Hulk	14 March 2009	1	N/A	Perth, Western Australia, Australia	
Win	7–4	Sam Brown	Decision (unanimous)	EFG: Weapons of Mass Destruction	3 May 2008	3	5:00	Penrith, New South Wales, Australia	Return to Light Heavyweight.
Loss	6–4	Hector Lombard	TKO (shoulder injury)	Warriors Realm 8	23 March 2007	1	3:50	Geelong, Victoria, Australia	
Win	6–3	Takahiro Oba	TKO (corner stoppage)	X-plosion	18 August 2006	2	5:00	Sydney, Australia	Return to Middleweight.
Loss	5–3	James Lee	Submission (rear-naked choke)	KOTC: Gunfather	10 February 2006	1	1:37	Sunshine Coast, Queensland, Australia	For the vacant KOTC Light Heavyweight Championship.
Win	5–2	Edwin Aguilar	TKO (punches)	Kumite 2	11 November 2005	2	N/A	Sydney, Australia	
Win	4–2	Adrian Leatuna	TKO (punches)	Kumite 1	2 July 2005	3	N/A	Sydney, Australia	
Loss	3–2	Matt Knight	DQ (fence grabbing)	KOTC: Australia	4 February 2005	1	4:01	Sydney, Australia	Middleweight debut.
Win	3–1	Kym Robinson	Submission (rear-naked choke)	XFC 6: Ultimate Fighting Returns	20 November 2004	1	2:19	Gold Coast, Queensland, Australia	
Win	2–1	Rocky Huni	Submission (rear-naked choke)	XFC 5: When Worlds Collide	13 August 2004	1	N/A	Gold Coast, Queensland, Australia	
Win	1–1	Matt Knight	Submission (rear-naked choke)	Xtreme Fight Club 2	5 June 2004	2	1:20	Gold Coast, Queensland, Australia	
Loss	0–1	Api Hemara	Submission (armbar)	Spartan Reality Fight 6	5 April 2003	1	2:20	Perth, Western Australia, Australia	

== See also ==
- List of current UFC fighters
- List of male mixed martial artists
