= Mirko Cro Cop =

Croatian mixed martial artist (born 1974)

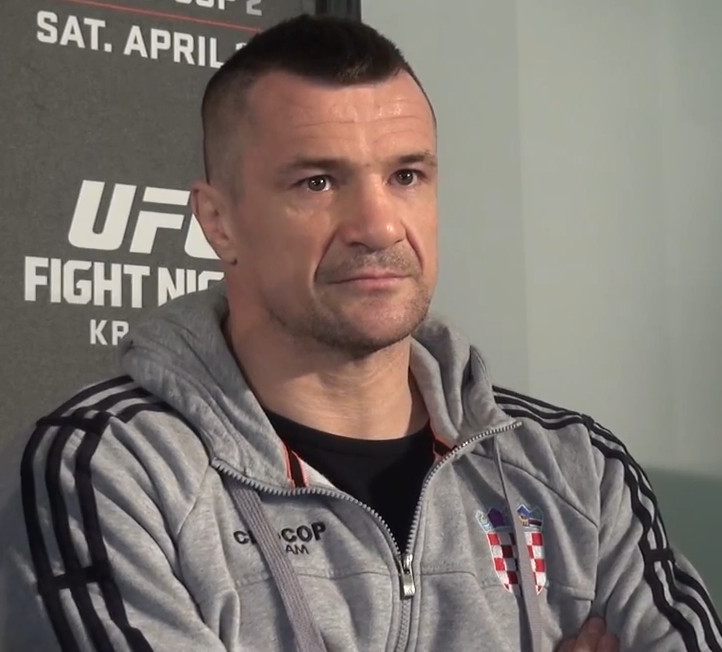
- Mirko Cro Cop in April 2015
- Born: Mirko Filipović; 10 September 1974 (age 52); Vinkovci, SR Croatia, SFR Yugoslavia
- Other names: Cro Cop
- Nationality: Croatian
- Height: 6 ft 2 in (188 cm)
- Weight: 234 lb (106 kg; 16 st 10 lb)
- Division: Heavyweight
- Reach: 73 in (185 cm)
- Style: Kickboxing
- Stance: Southpaw
- Fighting out of: Zagreb, Croatia
- Team: Cro Cop Squad Gym; Tigar Gym; Vos Gym
- Trainer: Branko Cikatić, Ivan Hippolyte, Stipe Drviš, Mario Mlinarić
- Rank: Black belt in Taekwondo
- Years active: 1996–2003, 2012–2014 (Kickboxing); 2001–2019 (MMA)

Kickboxing record
- Total: 34
- Wins: 26
- By knockout: 13
- Losses: 8
- By knockout: 4

Mixed martial arts record
- Total: 52
- Wins: 38
- By knockout: 30
- By submission: 4
- By decision: 4
- Losses: 11
- By knockout: 6
- By submission: 2
- By decision: 3
- Draws: 2
- No contests: 1

Amateur boxing record
- Total: 56
- Wins: 48
- By knockout: 31
- Losses: 8

Other information
- Occupation: Special forces officer, politician
- Spouse: Klaudija Filipović (m. 2002)
- Children: 2
- Website: www.mirkofilipovic.com
- Mixed martial arts record from Sherdog

Member of the Croatian Parliament
- In office 23 December 2003 – 11 January 2008
- President: Stjepan Mesić
- Prime Minister: Ivo Sanader
- Constituency: District 1

Personal details
- Party: Independent
- Other political affiliations: Social Democratic Party (SDP)

YouTube information
- Channel: Mirko Cro Cop Filipović Official
- Subscribers: 56 Thousand
- Views: 17.7 million
- Last updated: 9 May 2026

Mirko Filipović (Croatian pronunciation: [mirko fiːlipɔːʋitɕ]; born 10 September 1974), better known by his ring name Mirko Cro Cop, is a Croatian former professional mixed martial artist, kickboxer and amateur boxer. He is mostly known for his time in Pride Fighting Championships. Cro Cop fought in the UFC, K-1, RIZIN and Bellator. He is widely considered one of the greatest Heavyweight Kickboxers and MMA fighters of all time.

Cro Cop is the 2006 Pride Open-Weight Grand Prix Champion, the K-1 World Grand Prix FINAL in Zagreb Champion and the 2016 Rizin Openweight Grand Prix Champion becoming the second fighter in the world to win mixed martial arts and kickboxing championships and tournaments. He is also a former IGF Champion. His nickname, Cro Cop, short for "Croatian Cop", comes from his employment in the Lučko Anti-Terrorist Unit, Croatia's elite Police Special Forces tactical unit.

Cro Cop's signature move was his lightning-quick left high roundhouse kick, once famously described as "right leg, hospital; left leg, cemetery." He was a successful amateur boxer and medalled numerous times in international competition, and was also a member of Croatia's world team when he competed at the 1997 Amateur Boxing World Championships.

From 23 December 2003 until 11 January 2008, he served as a Member of the Croatian Parliament for the 1st electoral district. He was elected as an independent candidate on the list of the Social Democratic Party.

On 1 March 2019, he announced his retirement for health reasons, specifically a stroke he suffered.

== Background ==
Filipović was born on 10 September 1974 in Vinkovci in eastern Croatia, then part of the Socialist Federal Republic of Yugoslavia. He was raised in a working-class family with his sister, who is three years his senior. Mirko grew up training in track and field, namely the shorter distance events (100m, 200m, and 400m dashes). After seeing Jean-Claude Van Damme's performance in the film Bloodsport, he began training in his parents' garage with his father's boxing equipment and weights. His father, who worked as an electrician for a railway company, fashioned his son a crude but effective punching bag filled with sand and cotton, and would bring home track scraps for Mirko to use for weight training. Filipović began formal training in taekwondo at the age of 7 and later studied karate.

Filipović's father died in 1994 when Mirko was 19 years old and after Filipović had joined the Croatian Army as a radio telegraphist the year before. After writing a request to the commander of his military base to train with the Croatian national kickboxing team, his request was approved. The colonel told Filipović:

I don't think you will be a special soldier, but I believe you will be a good fighter one day. So you don't have to learn [with the radio telegraphists]. I release you and I want you to train twice a day. And I want you to make your country and your homeland proud one day.

Filipović described this as one of the best days of his life. After this, he embarked on a career in professional kickboxing.

== Boxing and kickboxing career ==
Filipović started his professional career in 1996 as a kickboxer, following in the footsteps of his compatriot Branko Cikatić. Before turning pro, he had accumulated an amateur boxing record of 48–8 (31 KO's). He defeated Jérôme Le Banner in his debut, but after losing to Ernesto Hoost in his next match, he turned his attention back to boxing and his law enforcement career. He had success in both areas as a three-time national amateur boxing champion and later joined the Lučko Anti-Terrorist Unit where he served for six years until he was elected to the Croatian Parliament. Filipović took part in the 1997 World Amateur Boxing Championships, losing his first round match-up against Olympic medalist Alexei Lezin. At the time, he was working as a commando in the Croatian police anti-terrorist unit Alpha (stationed in Lučko near Zagreb), which earned him his nickname "Cro Cop". He fought several times early in his career under the nickname "Tigar" (Croatian for "tiger").

Cro Cop was a runner up for the K-1 Grand Prix 1999 title and the K-1 World Grand Prix 2000 in Fukuoka title. Cro Cop captured the K-1 World Grand Prix FINAL in Zagreb title in 2014. Cro Cop had a 21-7 record with the promotion K-1, made two appearances in Glory. He is considered to be one of the greatest Kickboxers of all time.

== Mixed martial arts career ==
=== Pride FC ===
In 2001, Filipović began his switch to fighting in mixed martial arts promotion Pride Fighting Championships, citing personal challenge as well as dissatisfaction with K-1 salaries. A year later, he also left his job at the anti-terrorist unit in order to focus fully on his martial arts career.

Cro Cop's first 6 professional MMA fights were in K-1 2001 GP Final, PRIDE FC and the New Year's events Inoki-Bom-Ba-Ye. He defeated veterans Kazuyuki Fujita (twice) and Japanese legend Kazushi Sakuraba, while drawing with Nobuhiko Takada and reigning PRIDE Middleweight Champion Wanderlei Silva.

==== Early PRIDE career ====
Now fighting exclusively in PRIDE, Cro Cop's 7th MMA fight was against former title challenger Heath Herring, who sported a 20–8 record and had gone the distance with current champion Antonio Rodrigo Nogueira in addition to fighting soon-to-be champion Fedor Emelianenko, against whom he lost when the doctor had to stop the fight after the 1st round. Cro Cop defeated Herring via body kick and punches 3 minutes into the fight.

In his 8th fight, he became the first fighter to defeat legendary striker Igor Vovchanchyn by KO (with his trademark head kick). This was witnessed as a passing of the torch in the heavyweight division, as Vovchanchyn went on a decline and Cro Cop continued his run at the heavyweight title. Cro Cop then defeated Dos Caras Jr. via head kick KO in 46 seconds, and then told the fans that he would see them in his next fight for the title against Fedor Emelianenko.

==== PRIDE Interim Heavyweight Championship ====
After a contractual dispute between PRIDE and Fedor Emelianenko, PRIDE matched up Cro Cop against former champion Antônio Rodrigo Nogueira for the PRIDE Interim Heavyweight Championship. Cro Cop dominated early in the stand up; even knocking Nogueira down at the end of the round which prompted Yuji Shimada to wave the fight off, but the bell had already rung. At the start of the second round, Cro Cop was taken down, mounted and eventually submitted via armbar in the second round, suffering the first loss of his career.

==== PRIDE 2004 Heavyweight Grand Prix and comeback ====
After the loss to Nogueira, Cro Cop scored back to back first-round TKO's of Ron Waterman and Yoshihisa Yamamoto. It was after these performances that he was drawn into the bracket of the 2004 Heavyweight Grand Prix. In what was seen as the biggest upset in recent history at the time, Cro Cop was KO'd by former UFC Heavyweight Champion Kevin Randleman at 1:57 of the very first round, being eliminated in the opening round of the tournament where he was favored to be a finalist or even win it all.

It was after this tournament that Cro Cop went on a seven fight win streak from 23 May 2004 until 26 June 2005. He began by fighting 1 month after the loss to Randleman, against Hiromitsu Kanehara, a seasoned RINGS veteran. Cro Cop won by a unanimous decision (the second decision victory of his career). He then knocked out Shungo Oyama 2 months later in 1 minute. A month after that, Cro Cop scored a head kick knockout 2 minutes into his fight with Alexander Emelianenko (brother of the champion). Staying busy, Cro Cop defeated former UFC Heavyweight Champion and reigning King of Pancrase Josh Barnett 2 months later at PRIDE 28, when Barnett injured his shoulder only 46 seconds into the fight. 2 months after that, Cro Cop avenged his loss to Randleman by guillotine choke at PRIDE's new year show.

After defeating Randleman, Cro Cop stated that he wished to fight former UFC Heavyweight Champion and PRIDE 2000 Grand Prix Champion Mark Coleman. In the pre-fight interviews, Coleman repeatedly stated that he was going to take Cro Cop down and pound him out, while Cro Cop said there's no way he would be taken down and that he would defeat Coleman. At PRIDE 29, Cro Cop stuffed every single one of Coleman's take down attempts, staggered Coleman with straight lefts before knocking him out at 3:40 of the first round.

Cro Cop had defeated 3 former UFC Heavyweight champions back to back, and said in the ring after defeating Coleman:

I'm still standing, and I'm still waiting for a title fight. Emelianenko Fedor, you are next.

Cro Cop faced Emelianenko's teammate, Ibragim Magomedov at PRIDE Critical Countdown 2005, winning by a body kick TKO in the 1st round (his 6th first round finish in a row). Emelianenko cornered Magomedov for this fight, and after the fight, stepped into the ring and shook hands with Cro Cop as the two posed with the championship belt. Cro Cop finally received a chance to fight Fedor for the Pride Heavyweight Championship. The highly anticipated match between Emelianenko and Cro Cop finally took place at PRIDE Final Conflict 2005.

==== PRIDE title fight with Emelianenko ====
In the first round, Cro Cop stunned and broke Emelianenko's nose with two quick straight left hands. He discolored Fedor's midsection with powerful body kicks. Emelianenko was then able to get the fight to the ground and land several body shots and, as the fight progressed, Emelianenko became more and more dominant, winning most of the stand up exchanges and scoring several takedowns. After 20 minutes, Emelianenko was awarded a unanimous decision victory. The fight was awarded fight of the year by mmafighting.com and fight of the decade by Sports Illustrated.

==== Post-title shot and PRIDE 2006 Openweight Grand Prix ====
After the loss to Emelianenko, Cro Cop defeated Josh Barnett at PRIDE 30 by a unanimous decision, and then dropped a split decision loss to hard hitting K-1 veteran Mark Hunt at PRIDE Shockwave 2005.

Coming into the 2006 Openweight Grand Prix, Cro Cop TKO'd two Japanese legends, Pancrase veteran Ikuhisa Minowa in the opening round, and 1992 Olympic Judo Gold Medalist Hidehiko Yoshida in the quarterfinal. On his 32nd birthday, he met Wanderlei Silva at Pride Final Conflict Absolute in the semi-finals, where he put on one of his best performances, defeating the Middleweight champion with his trademark head kick knockout.

This put him in the final against Josh Barnett, a fighter whom he would face for the third time in his career. After exchanging in the stand up, Cro Cop was able to posture in Barnett's guard - landing many punches. At 7:32 of the first round, Barnett tapped to strikes, earning Cro Cop his first belt in his MMA career - the PRIDE 2006 Openweight Grand Prix championship. When PRIDE president Nobuyuki Sakakibara placed the belt around Cro Cop's waist, Cro Cop broke down in tears and addressed the crowd in attendance, saying "This is the happiest day in my life. It's my 32nd birthday, and I want to thank all my fans in the arena, and all around the world for supporting me during my career. I love you, thank you."

Many have cited the performances that night as Cro Cop's finest - leading Wanderlei Silva's trainer, Rudimar Federigo to say, "That was Mirko's day. He fought two perfect fights and I believe even Fedor could lose to him on that night." Josh Barnett would later say - despite facing top fighters like Antonio Rodrigo Nogueira, Randy Couture, Frank Mir and Andrei Arlovski - that Cro Cop was the best fighter he ever faced in his career.

After winning the belt, Cro Cop revealed some more of his emotions behind the victory in the backstage interview with Frank Trigg,

All I can say is this is the happiest day of my life. Definitely. I was waiting for this for 10 long years and finally - I knew that I'm the best, but some circumstances just didn't let me do that. To go to the end, and I proved to all the people who were talking that I'm finished, that I'm done after Fedor's fight, that I am number one. Believe it or not, and I swear with everything I got, I told myself, "If I don't take this belt, it will be my last MMA fight in my life." I would quit fighting, I swear. And that's why I said, "now or never". And plus I was training like never before, and I was motivated, and I knew this is it.

There is no [bad] blood between us [myself and Silva.] I would like to know how he is, and I would like to shake hands with him. That's all. I have nothing against him, really. But I told you before, he is just acting weird and he refused any kind of contact, but I'm not mad at Wanderlei, I don't hate him. I respect him as a fighter, and I would like to see him if he's still here.

I'm very happy, this is the day of my life, and I'm only sorry for one thing - that my father couldn't live long enough to see my success. He died 12 years ago and I dedicate this belt for my father.

After his victory at the 2006 Openweight Grand Prix, a rematch between Cro Cop and Fedor Emelianenko failed to materialize and on 12 December 2006 Cro Cop pulled out of the New Year's Eve event, citing both a foot injury and Emelianenko's commitment to meet Mark Hunt at the card in question. Through his official website, Cro Cop revealed "I still can't kick like I want to. It's the best that we give more time to this injury to heal. I want to be in perfect shape for my next fights."

Cro Cop has often been cited as being one member of the "Holy Trinity of PRIDE" (alongside Rodrigo Nogueira and Emelianenko.) These 3 heavyweights were considered anywhere between number 1–3 at any point in time between 2003 and 2007, and are often looked at as the "golden age" of MMA.

=== Ultimate Fighting Championship ===
In December 2006, rumors began to surface about Cro Cop entertaining offers from other mixed martial arts organizations; the Ultimate Fighting Championship was one of the promotions that Cro Cop confirmed came forward with an offer. Rumors continued to circulate about Cro Cop's future with the Pride FC organization and media websites were reporting that Cro Cop had chosen the UFC for his future. It was announced during the pay-per-view of UFC 66 that Cro Cop indeed signed with the UFC.

==== UFC debut ====
Mirko made his UFC debut at UFC 67 on Saturday, 3 February - which featured fellow debutants and future UFC champions Quinton Jackson, Lyoto Machida and Frankie Edgar - stopping the undefeated prospect Eddie Sanchez by TKO at 4:33 of the very 1st round. Average betting for this fight was around -1200 for "Cro Cop" and +800 for Eddie Sanchez, the biggest gap for underdog/favorite in UFC history.

It has been speculated that the reason Cro Cop did not receive an immediate title shot - despite being ranked #2 across many media outlets - was due to his lack of popularity with the UFC audience.

==== UFC title eliminator ====
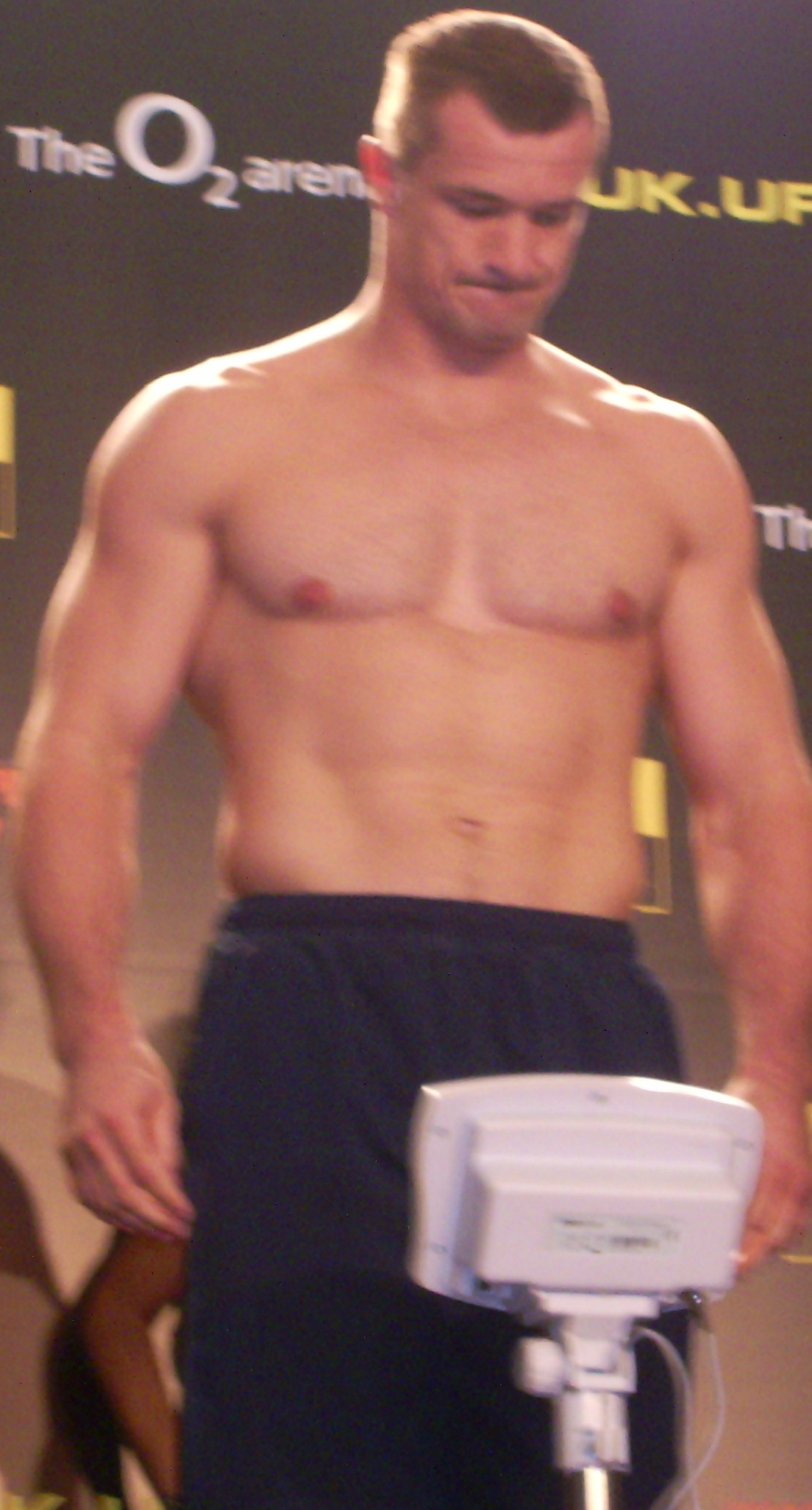
Mirko Cro Cop during weigh-in, September 8, 2007, The O2 Arena, London

On 21 April 2007, Cro Cop faced Gabriel Gonzaga at UFC 70 in Manchester, United Kingdom to determine who would challenge reigning champion Randy Couture for the heavyweight title. In what was seen as an upset by many in the MMA world, Gonzaga won with a head kick knockout at 4:51 of the 1st round.

Cro Cop later said about the fight,

He hit me at least 10 or 15 times, clean shots to the head. It was a miracle that I didn't start bleeding. Maybe it would have been better for me if he had cut me, as the referee would stop the fight. But when we stood up I saw 3 opponents. I was finished already. I took too many shots to the head. I was totally out of control. He threw a high kick, it landed on my head and that was it. But I'm a fighter and there's no shame in falling down, only not to rise again. But that's my life, you cannot win all the time. But of course the goal is that you must try [to always win]. It was my mistake. He did what he had to do. He had his plan and he threw too many elbows and I lost the fight and that's it.

==== End of first UFC stint ====
Cro Cop's next fight was on 8 September 2007 at UFC 75 against French kickboxer Cheick Kongo, which he lost by unanimous decision with 29–28 on all three scorecards. There was some controversy, as Kongo landed 3 illegal groin strikes but was not even deducted a point. Cro Cop trained with Remy Bonjasky and Gilbert Yvel, and 2003 Abu Dhabi Combat Club champion grappler Dean Lister for this fight. Lister joined Cro Cop at his home town for a month to train for this upcoming bout. Cro Cop's coach was Vos Gym's main trainer and muay thai practitioner Ivan "Hydro" Hippolyte.

=== Dream ===
On 12 February 2008, Cro Cop announced a visit to Japan on his blog. With the foundation of the new MMA event, 'Dream', co-established by FEG running K-1 Hero's and the former Yarennoka! organizing committee members which had managed Pride FC, Cro Cop officiates ending his career in UFC and the participation into the new event.

Fight Entertainment Group confirmed on 11 March 2008 that Cro Cop would face Tatsuya Mizuno at Dream 1 on 15 March at Saitama Super Arena, Saitama, Japan.

When asked about Cro Cop's current contract status with the UFC and whether it would interfere with his participation in 'Dream' events, Dream producer and front man Keiichi Sasahara said, "Though I can't share specific details about his contract, there will not be any foreseeable problems arising."

Cro Cop was vague in answering the question himself, qualifying his response by mentioning his intent to return to the UFC sometime in the future.

Well, as you all know, I had a bad period in my last two fights, which I'd lost in the UFC, I don't want anyone to think that I'm running away from the UFC, but I was thinking a lot about how to continue with my career, and I think in this moment, I think Dream is the right place for me.

Another thing is that I never liked fighting in the cage. I always liked to fight in the ring. The second thing is that I liked fighting in Japan. Japan is like my second home—I feel like I'm home in Japan. All those reasons [have brought me] here, and I'm very happy that I'm going to fight here in Japan. But of course, one day, I don't know when, but definitely I'll be back in the UFC to show that it was just a bad period for me. Now I'm fully recovered, physically and mentally, most important mentally.

On 23 September 2008, Cro Cop fought against Alistair Overeem at Dream 6. After almost half of the first round saw Overeem takedown Cro Cop twice and the two fighters exchanging stand-up and ground strikes (with Cro Cop sustaining a cut) the bout was stopped and declared a no contest due to Overeem landing multiple knees to the groin of Cro Cop, who stated after the match that he had wanted to continue to fight, as evident by his remaining in the ring, but the ringside doctor would not allow him to continue. His manager stated that the injury was not serious and that a rematch as soon as possible was sought. Cro Cop said that he was planning for a long fight and a KO towards the end. He expressed frustration and quoted "I'm angry it ended this way, it seemed as if he was the dominant one, however, I wasn't in trouble for a second and was waiting for my opportunities. I prepared very well because I thought the match could last a while. I thought I would knock him down in the end." In recording the fight, Cro Cop's corner relayed to the announcers that his right testicle had been lodged inside of his body and that he could not continue. He later limped out of the arena.

=== Return to the UFC ===
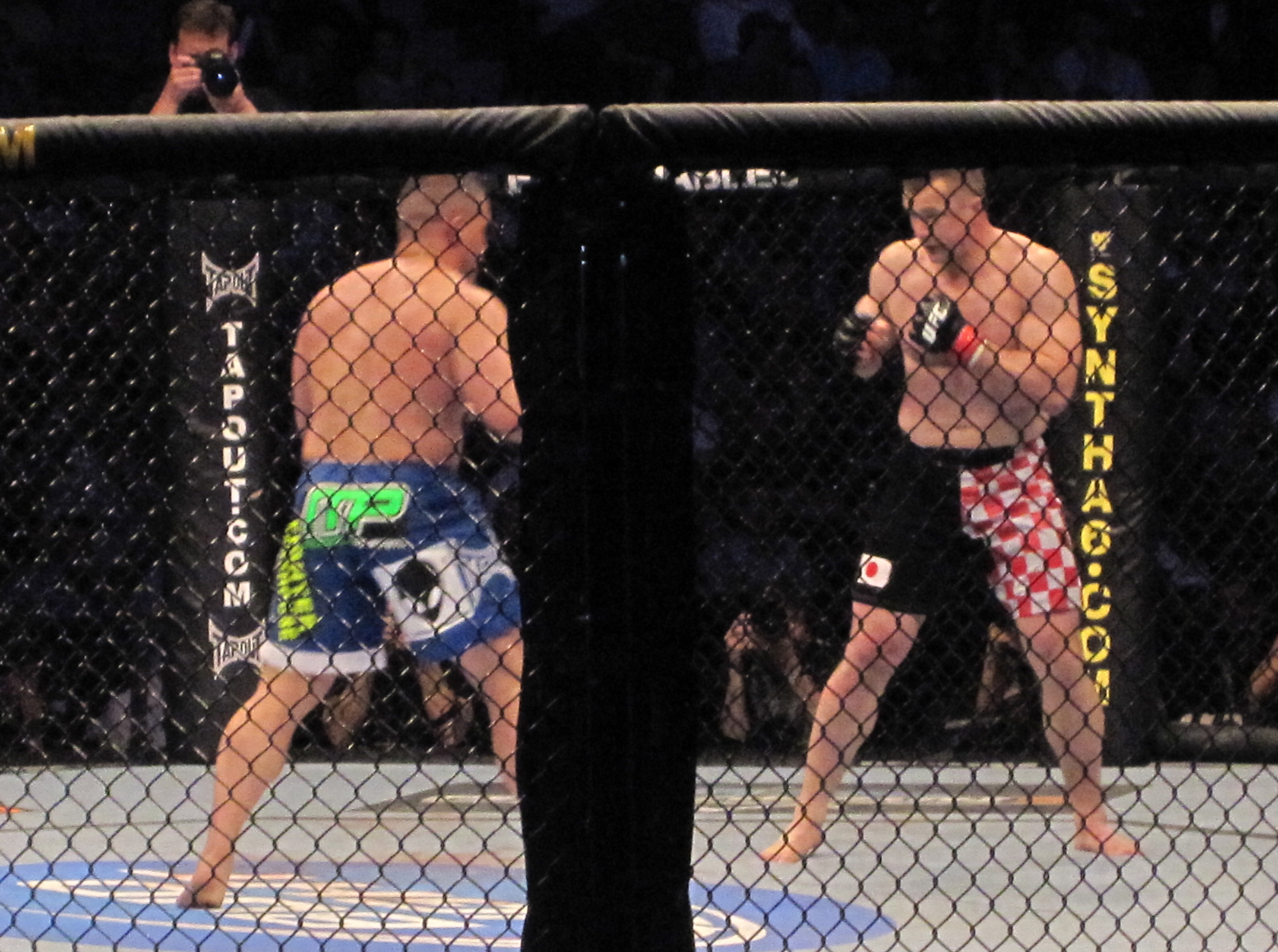
Mirko Cro Cop defeated Pat Barry by submission due to a rear-naked choke at UFC 115 in Vancouver, British Columbia, Canada.

On 18 May 2009, Cro Cop issued a press release on his official website and his MMAid account stating his scheduled return to the UFC. His first match upon returning was at UFC 99 in Germany against Mostapha al-Turk. During the bout, Cro Cop knocked down al-Turk with punches within the first round, then allowed him to stand. The fight ended when Cro Cop finished al-Turk with a flurry of punches that left al-Turk unable to defend himself. After the one-fight agreement with the UFC, it was announced Cro Cop was scheduled to return to Dream to face Siala "Mighty Mo" Siliga on 20 July at Dream.10. On 3 July 2009, it was reported that he might have re-signed with the UFC after getting an offer "he couldn't refuse" by UFC co-owner Lorenzo Fertitta, who personally flew to Cro Cop's residence in Zagreb. It was later confirmed at the UFC Fan Expo by Fertitta that Cro Cop had indeed signed a three-fight contract with the UFC.

Cro Cop fought up and coming striker Junior dos Santos at UFC 103. During the third round, Cro Cop sustained an uppercut to his left eye that caused him to submit by waving his hand at the referee and motioning that there was a problem with his eye. The fight was officially stopped due to submission, giving Dos Santos the win. After the fight, Cro Cop showed signs of frustration, stating, "I don't feel the hunger anymore. I started playing it safe, I'm not ready to take risks."

He hired legendary former Muay Thai champion Ivan Hippolyte and revamped his whole training team. Cro Cop was scheduled to face Ben Rothwell on 21 February 2010 at UFC 110. Just days before the fight, Rothwell was forced to withdraw from the event because of an illness. Australian fighter Anthony Perosh stepped in to replace Rothwell.

During the fight, Cro Cop dominated for two rounds before opening a cut on Perosh's forehead which forced a doctor stoppage before the third round and awarded the TKO win to Cro Cop, who fought despite receiving a cut in training that required stitches.

Cro Cop next fought against fellow former Kickboxer Pat Barry at UFC 115 in Vancouver, British Columbia, Canada. After being knocked down twice to the canvas in the first round by Barry's strikes, he won the second round after utilizing his ground game. The third round saw Cro Cop open up with a head kick followed by an axe kick to Barry's head. He ended the fight with a strong flurry, dropping Barry against the cage where he continued his assault with numerous punches to the face. He then took his back and defeated Barry by rear-naked choke, earning him Submission of the Night honors which Cro Cop had joked to Dana White and the crowd earlier that he deserved it. Prior to the Barry fight, Cro Cop was detained by Canadian officials, who threatened to deport him. He revealed that the Canadian officials had asked for details of his activities in the Lučko ATJ in which he had served, his service starting several years after the Croatian War of Independence. He was held for six hours.

Cro Cop faced former UFC heavyweight champion Frank Mir on 25 September 2010 at UFC 119, replacing an injured Antônio Rodrigo Nogueira. There was a brief scare the weekend before the fight when Cro Cop suffered an eye injury in Croatia during his final day of training, but upon arrival in the U.S., was medically cleared to compete.

Neither fighter managed to deliver any significant damage to the other until Cro Cop was defeated by Mir at 4:02 of the third round by KO due to a knee strike to the head. In a later interview for a Croatian television station, Cro Cop stated that he suffered a disc herniation three weeks before the fight with Mir. He decided not to inform the UFC about this injury because he believed it would seem as if he was trying to pull out of the fight.

Cro Cop was defeated by Ultimate Fighter alumnus Brendan Schaub on 19 March 2011, at UFC 128: Shogun vs. Jones by way of KO at 3:44 of the third round. Shortly after the knockout loss to Schaub, Dana White stated that Cro Cop is most likely retiring. Since this time, Dana White has appeared to have had a change of heart. In a recent interview, White said: "This guy wants to fight again, and I owe him another fight." White also added "Do I think he should have retired? Yeah," White said. "But I don't think he's in one of these situations like Chuck Liddell, who needed to retire right then. He's a man, a grown man, and if he wants to continue to fight, that's his right."

In his last fight with the UFC, Cro Cop was defeated by Roy Nelson at UFC 137 by TKO due to punches in round 3. Even though he looked to be in a good physical condition for the fight, he still didn't look like the same fighter from his days in PRIDE FC. In an interview to a Croatian television station, Cro Cop revealed that he suffered an arm injury in training 10 days before the fight. Cro Cop said the injury came as a result of him sparring with Pat Barry and that the doctors told him he had to go into surgery because a tendon had separated from a bone, but he refused. He decided to go through with the fight without informing the UFC officials about his injury.

=== Retirement from MMA and return to kickboxing ===
Although he had not completely retired, Cro Cop considered that his days with the UFC, and possibly MMA, were finished. He announced that he would return to kickboxing to fight at Cro Cop Final Fight 2012 at the Zagreb Arena on 10 March 2012. Mirko defeated Ray Sefo by unanimous decision.

Cro Cop fought on 27 May 2012 at K-1 World MAX 2012 World Championship Tournament Final 16 in Madrid, Spain against Loren Javier Jorge, winning by knockout in the second round with a left uppercut.

He faced Randy Blake at the K-1 World Grand Prix 2012 in Tokyo final 16 on 14 October 2012. In the third round, after a break and restart, Cro Cop attempted to apologize for a late uppercut, failing to put his hands up to defend and leading to a straight punch by Blake that resulted in a knockdown. Despite this incident, Cro Cop was able to outfight the American en route to a majority decision win.

He was scheduled to fight at Cro Cop Final Fight 2013 on 15 March 2013 in Zagreb, and expressed his desire to face Gökhan Saki. The event was then merged with the K-1 World Grand Prix 2012 Final, and was the first K-1 World Grand Prix held outside of Japan. He faced American boxer Jarrell Miller in the quarter-finals where the panel of judges awarded Cro Cop a unanimous decision due to Cro Cop landing more significant strikes. He advanced to the semi-finals where he outpointed Pavel Zhuravlev to another unanimous decision. In the final, he fought Ismael Londt and floored the Suriname fighter with his patented left high kick in round two en route to yet another unanimous decision victory to win the tournament, thirteen years after he had finished as runner-up in 1999.

He lost to Remy Bonjasky by a widely disputed majority decision in a rematch at Glory 14: Zagreb in Zagreb on 8 March 2014. He was set to rematch Pat Barry at Glory 17: Los Angeles in Inglewood, California on 21 June 2014 but Barry withdrew from the fight for undisclosed reasons and was replaced by Sergei Kharitonov. Kharitonov then also withdrew, however, and was replaced by Jarrell Miller. Cro Cop won the rematch, against Jarrell Miller, by unanimous decision.

=== Return to MMA ===
On 8 August 2012 news came that Cro Cop had said that he would like to return to MMA, and on 31 December 2012, he made his comeback against former sumo wrestler and MMA newcomer Shinichi Suzukawa at Inoki Bom-Ba-Ye 2012 in Tokyo, Japan. He won the fight by submission due to an armbar at 1:18 of the first round.

Cro Cop was expected to rematch with Alexander Emelianenko in October or November 2013 in Russia. On 25 October 2013, it was reported that Emelianenko had been accused of assaulting a 63-year-old man in a bar. The fight organizer terminated the contract with Emelianenko and announced that Cro Cop would face a different opponent from Russia. Cro Cop eventually faced Aleksei Oleinik, who replaced Emelianenko, on 8 November 2013 at Legends 2 in Moscow. He lost the fight by submission in the first round.

On 23 August 2014, Cro Cop defeated former 2008 Olympic judo gold medalist Satoshi Ishii via TKO (doctor stoppage) at an Inoki Genome Federation (IGF) event in Japan to win the IGF Championship.

Cro Cop was expected to fight Satoshi Ishii in a rematch on 31 December 2014 for the IGF Championship. However, the rematch was canceled due to a rib injury sustained by Ishii. Cro Cop stayed on the card and a new match up was being sought for a brief period. On 1 December, it was reported that Ishii would be able to heal up in time to take the fight, and the rematch was official once again. Cro Cop defeated Ishii via TKO, landing a head kick and follow up punches just as the second round was coming to a close. Ishii was unable to make it to his corner under his own power, forcing the referee to call an end to the fight. Following his return to UFC, Cro Cop was stripped of the IGF Championship on 23 January 2015.

=== Retirement from kickboxing and third stint in the UFC ===
On 20 January 2015, Bloody Elbow reported that Cro Cop had re-signed with the UFC. Days earlier, Bellator MMA CEO Scott Coker had expressed interest in signing the IGF champion. This would mark the fighter's third stint with the promotion.

A rematch with Gabriel Gonzaga took place on 11 April 2015 at UFC Fight Night 64. After losing the first two rounds, Cro Cop landed an elbow in the clinch which rocked Gonzaga and finished the fight via TKO after landing multiple elbows and punches on the ground. The bout earned both men Fight of the Night bonus honors.

=== Second retirement from MMA and anti-doping violation ===
Cro Cop was expected to face Anthony Hamilton on 28 November 2015 at UFC Fight Night 79. However, on 10 November, it was announced that Cro Cop had pulled out of the fight and abruptly announced his retirement. Subsequently, on 11 November 2015, the U.S. Anti-Doping Agency (USADA) notified both Mirko Cro Cop and the UFC that he has been provisionally suspended due to a potential Anti-Doping Policy violation. The following day in a statement Cro Cop confirmed that he had used human growth hormone for his shoulder injury and had admitted this to the UFC. On 25 November, Cro Cop was suspended for two years by USADA retroactive to 9 November 2015. On 20 July 2016 UFC announced that it has terminated the remaining bouts of Cro Cop's contract. Despite admitting to the use of hGH and plasma, it was later reported that Mirko Cro Cop's USADA tests were negative. However, the 2-year suspension was not lifted, because he admitted to taking a prohibited substance.

=== Second MMA return ===
In July 2016, Cro Cop announced that he was ending his retirement and would return to mixed martial arts competition in Japan. He made his return with the Rizin Fighting Federation as part of a 16-man openweight tournament beginning 25 September 2016 in Tokyo.

==== RIZIN ====
Cro Cop defeated Korean Hyun Man Myung in the first round via an arm-triangle choke in the opening round of the tournament.

Cro Cop was scheduled to face Wanderlei Silva in a trilogy bout on 29 December in the Rizin Open Weight quarter finals. However, on 2 December, Silva withdrew from the bout.

Rizin announced that Cro Cop would then face Muhammed Lawal, who had just fought Satoshi Ishii on December 16 at Bellator 169. On 29 December, Cro Cop won the bout via TKO in the second round. Cro Cop handed Lawal his first loss at heavyweight, with Lawal being 9–0 as a heavyweight prior to this fight.

Cro Cop faced Baruto Kaito on 31 December 2016 in the Rizin Openweight Grand Prix Semifinals. He won the fight via knee to the body at 0:49 of the first round. Cro Cop then faced Amir Aliakbari in the final that same night. He won the fight via knockout to become the inaugural Rizin Openweight Grand Prix champion.

After winning the Grand Prix, he left the door open to a farewell fight, saying, "It would be nice if I will be able to recover enough that I can have a farewell fight, maybe in Japan. It would be nice, but to tell you the truth I don't know how the surgery will do."

Cro Cop mentioned in an interview on 20 October 2017 that he would like to rematch Fedor Emelianenko, and that he has several promotions contacting him for fights. He also addressed his injury situation, saying, "I managed to repair my knee, I was among the first in Croatia to have the transplanted stem cells in my knee. My new cartilage has come in, it's amazing! The future of medicine."

It was later announced on Sakakibara's Instagram account that Cro Cop would return to fight in the RIZIN ring several more times. He faced Tsuyoshi Kohsaka on 31 December 2017 at Rizin World Grand Prix 2017: Final Round. Cro Cop won the fight via TKO early into the first round.

==== Bellator MMA ====
On 5 March 2018 it was announced that Cro Cop has signed with Bellator MMA. He was expected to debut on 25 May 2018 against Roy Nelson in a rematch at Bellator 200. However, the bout was scrapped during the week leading up to the event as Cro Cop pulled out of the fight citing an injury.

The rematch against Nelson eventually took place on 16 February 2019 at Bellator 216. Cro Cop was able to avenge his loss to Nelson, winning the fight by unanimous decision (30–27, 29–28, and 29–28). This was his tenth consecutive win and the eighth time in his career that he won a rematch.

On 1 March 2019, Filipovic announced his immediate retirement following a stroke he had after the fight with Nelson. Filipovic revealed he had previous neck issues which hindered his movement and balance and that physicians strictly forbade him to fight, fearing that a blow to the head might even render him paralyzed.

== Professional wrestling career ==
=== Hustle (2007) ===
Aside from his kickboxing and mixed martial arts career, Cro Cop had a special appearance for professional wrestling promotion Hustle, which was owned by Dream Stage Entertainment along with Pride. During the New Year Hustle event on 31 December 2007, the babyface team of Ryoji Sai and Erica faced Kintaman and Kurodaman in a special "Dynamite Hardcore Hustle Match", where the wrestlers could access to weapons by playing a slot machine. When Sai and Erica scored the maximum prize, Cro Cop came to the ring to help them as a "living weapon." He executed a belly to belly suplex on Kurodaman and then hit Kintaman with his right high kick, knocking him out and allowing Erica to pin him, after which Cro Cop cut a promo with the winners. Despite the predetermined nature of the event, Cro Cop accidentally kicked Kintaman full force and caused him to be hospitalized.

== Fighting style ==
A pure sprawl and brawl fighter, Cro Cop focused his game on his kickboxing acumen and skill to avoid being taken to the ground. He made use of powerful yet technical striking, epitomized by his famous left roundhouse kick to the head, sometimes combined with a fast left straight punch in order to open position. Despite the relative predictability of his technique, Cro Cop was able to hit it consistently by speed and timing, gaining 28 KO/TKO wins in his career, of which four were by head kick alone. Towards the end of his career, his signature left high kick became more and more anticipated by his opponents, with Cro Cop even saying once, "Everybody is studying my fights. It's harder and harder to land the high kick. Everybody is expecting the high kick. It's much easier to do it at the beginning of your career."

In the defensive field, he often utilized a signature left sidestep to avoid his adversary's lunges and demonstrated a solid ability to sprawl. He stopped takedowns from Olympian caliber wrestlers such as Mark Coleman, Olympic judoka champions like Hidehiko Yoshida, wrestling champions like Kazuyuki Fujita or veteran wrestlers like Heath Herring and judoka and sambist Aleksander Emelianenko. Though always focused on striking, Cro Cop developed ground fighting skills over time, being adept in fighting from his back and recovering the standing position.

His persona has inspired many newer generation fighters, notably Demetrious Johnson, who once referred to Cro Cop after his record-breaking title defense, saying, "There was a long time ago in PRIDE: (Mirko) 'Cro-Cop' (Filipovic), it was his birthday, and he had that look on his face like nobody was going to take that championship away from him... That's how I felt (Saturday). I felt like no one was going to take this away from me."

== Failed drug test ==
On 25 November 2015, USADA announced that Filipović received a 2-year sanction for his anti-doping policy violations of the UFC Anti-Doping Policy. Filipović admitted to the use, attempted use, and possession of human growth hormone (hGH) following an out-of-competition test conducted on 4 November 2015, in Zagreb, Croatia. Though, the test results came back negative. However, his admission of guilt to UFC staff led to his USADA suspension. Filipović claimed he took HGH on a doctor's advice to heal a shoulder injury.

== Personal life ==
Cro Cop and his wife have two sons, Ivan and Filip. In the 2004–05 season of the Croatian Second Football League, Cro Cop played for his hometown football club, HNK Cibalia, participating in the final 8 minutes of a match against HNK Vukovar.

Cro Cop is fluent in English.

=== Film career ===
Cro Cop starred in the 2005 action film Ultimate Force as Axon Rey.

=== Political career ===
Cro Cop was elected to the Croatian Parliament, where he served one term from 23 December 2003 to 11 January 2008. He was elected on a list for Social Democratic Party of Croatia from I electoral district.

== Championships and accomplishments ==
- Only person to win K-1, Pride, and RIZIN Grand Prix championships

=== Kickboxing ===
- K-1
  - K-1 World Grand Prix FINAL in Zagreb Champion
  - K-1 World Grand Prix 2000 in Fukuoka runner-up
  - K-1 Braves '99 3rd Place
  - K-1 World Grand Prix 1999 runner-up
  - Prague Kickboxing 8-man tournament 1997 Champion
- International Kick-Boxing Federation
  - I.K.B.F. World Heavyweight Full Contact Champion

=== Mixed martial arts ===
- Rizin Fighting Federation
  - 2016 Rizin World Openweight Grand Prix Champion
  - Undefeated in 'Rizin Fighting Federation' competition (6–0)
- Inoki Genome Federation
  - IGF Championship (one time)
  - One successful title defense
  - Undefeated in 'IGF' competition (5–0)
- Pride Fighting Championships
  - 2006 Pride World Open-Weight Grand Prix Champion
  - Tied (Wanderlei Silva) for most finishes in Pride history (16)
  - Most first round finishes in Pride history (15)
  - Most wins through kicks in Pride history (8)
  - Most head kick knockouts in Pride history (4)
  - Second most knockouts in PRIDE FC history (14) (behind Wanderlei Silva)
  - Tied (Kazushi Sakuraba & Igor Vovchanchyn) for second most wins in PRIDE FC history (18) (behind Wanderlei Silva)
  - Fourth most fights in PRIDE FC history (24)
  - Only fighter to consecutively defeat three former UFC Heavyweight Champions in Pride history (Josh Barnett, Kevin Randleman, Mark Coleman)
- Ultimate Fighting Championship
  - Fight of the Night (One time) vs. Gabriel Gonzaga
  - Submission of the Night (One time) vs. Pat Barry
  - Tied (Charles Oliveira) for most finishes in Zuffa, LLC (UFC, Pride, WEC, Strikeforce) history (21)
  - Most first-round finishes in Zuffa, LLC (UFC, Pride, WEC, Strikeforce) history (17)
  - Most wins through kicks in Zuffa, LLC (UFC, Pride, WEC, Strikeforce) history (8)
  - Second most head kick knockouts in Zuffa, LLC (UFC, Pride, WEC, Strikeforce) history (4) (behind Donald Cerrone)
  - Second most knockouts in Zuffa, LLC (UFC, Pride, WEC, Strikeforce) history (18) (behind Wanderlei Silva)
    - Tied (Jeremy Stephens) for sixth most knockdowns landed in Zuffa, LLC (UFC, Pride, WEC, Strikeforce) history (18)
- MMA Fighting
  - 2003 Fight of the Year vs. Antônio Rodrigo Nogueira on November 9
  - 2005 Fight of the Year vs. Fedor Emelianenko on August 28
  - 2006 Knockout of the Year vs. Wanderlei Silva on September 10
  - 2006 Heavyweight Fighter of the Year
- Black Belt Magazine
  - 2003 Full-Contact Fighter of the Year
- Fight Matrix
  - 2003 Knockout of the Year vs. Igor Vovchanchyn on 10 August
  - 2005 Fight of the Year vs. Fedor Emelianenko on 28 August
  - 2005 Most Noteworthy Match of the Year vs. Fedor Emelianenko on 28 August
- Wrestling Observer Newsletter
  - 2006 Most Outstanding Fighter
- Sherdog
  - 2006 Knockout of the Year vs. Wanderlei Silva on September 10
  - Mixed Martial Arts Hall of Fame
- Sports Illustrated
  - 2000's Fight of the Decade vs. Fedor Emelianenko on August 28
- Yahoo! Sports
  - 2000's Fight of the Decade vs. Fedor Emelianenko on 28 August
- Bleacher Report
  - 2000s Striker of the Decade

=== Amateur boxing ===
- International Military Sports Council
  - 1998 CISM World Military Championships silver medalist
- Czech Amateur Boxing Association
  - 1998 Usti Grand Prix bronze medalist
- International Committee for the Mediterranean Games
  - 1997 Mediterranean Games bronze medalist
- Hellenic Boxing Federation
  - 1997 Acropolis Cup silver medalist

== Mixed martial arts record ==
Professional record breakdown
52 matches	38 wins	11 losses
By knockout	30	6
By submission	4	2
By decision	4	3
Draws	2	
No contests	1	

Res.	Record	Opponent	Method	Event	Date	Round	Time	Location	Notes
Win	38–11–2 (1)	Roy Nelson	Decision (unanimous)	Bellator 216	February 16, 2019	3	5:00	Uncasville, Connecticut, United States	
Win	37–11–2 (1)	Roque Martinez	TKO (doctor stoppage)	Rizin 13 - Saitama	September 30, 2018	1	4:58	Saitama, Japan	
Win	36–11–2 (1)	Tsuyoshi Kohsaka	TKO (corner stoppage)	Rizin World Grand-Prix 2017: Final Round	December 31, 2017	1	1:02	Saitama, Japan	
Win	35–11–2 (1)	Amir Aliakbari	KO (punches)	Rizin World Grand Prix 2016: Final Round	December 31, 2016	1	2:03	Saitama, Japan	Won the 2016 Rizin Openweight Grand Prix.
Win	34–11–2 (1)	Baruto Kaito	KO (knee to the body)	Rizin World Grand Prix 2016: Final Round	December 31, 2016	1	0:49	Saitama, Japan	2016 Rizin Openweight Grand Prix Semifinal.
Win	33–11–2 (1)	Muhammed Lawal	TKO (punches)	Rizin World Grand Prix 2016: 2nd Round	December 29, 2016	2	1:41	Saitama, Japan	2016 Rizin Openweight Grand Prix Quarterfinal.
Win	32–11–2 (1)	Myung Hyun-man	Submission (arm-triangle choke)	Rizin World Grand Prix 2016: 1st Round	September 25, 2016	1	2:20	Saitama, Japan	2016 Rizin Openweight Grand Prix First Round.
Win	31–11–2 (1)	Gabriel Gonzaga	TKO (elbows and punches)	UFC Fight Night: Gonzaga vs. Cro Cop 2	April 11, 2015	3	3:30	Kraków, Poland	Fight of the Night.
Win	30–11–2 (1)	Satoshi Ishii	TKO (head kick and punches)	Inoki Bom-Ba-Ye 2014	December 31, 2014	2	5:00	Tokyo, Japan	Defended the IGF Championship. Later vacated title.
Win	29–11–2 (1)	Satoshi Ishii	TKO (doctor stoppage)	Inoki Genome Fighting 2	August 23, 2014	2	2:37	Tokyo, Japan	Won the IGF Championship.
Loss	28–11–2 (1)	Alexey Oleynik	Submission (scarf hold)	Legend: Part 2: Invasion	November 8, 2013	1	4:42	Moscow, Russia	
Win	28–10–2 (1)	Shinichi Suzukawa	Submission (armbar)	Inoki Bom-Ba-Ye 2012	December 31, 2012	1	1:18	Tokyo, Japan	
Loss	27–10–2 (1)	Roy Nelson	TKO (punches)	UFC 137	October 29, 2011	3	1:30	Las Vegas, Nevada, United States	
Loss	27–9–2 (1)	Brendan Schaub	KO (punch)	UFC 128	March 19, 2011	3	3:44	Newark, New Jersey, United States	
Loss	27–8–2 (1)	Frank Mir	KO (knee)	UFC 119	September 25, 2010	3	4:02	Indianapolis, Indiana, United States	
Win	27–7–2 (1)	Pat Barry	Submission (rear-naked choke)	UFC 115	June 12, 2010	3	4:30	Vancouver, British Columbia, Canada	Submission of the Night.
Win	26–7–2 (1)	Anthony Perosh	TKO (doctor stoppage)	UFC 110	February 20, 2010	2	5:00	Sydney, Australia	
Loss	25–7–2 (1)	Junior dos Santos	TKO (submission to punch)	UFC 103	September 19, 2009	3	2:00	Dallas, Texas, United States	
Win	25–6–2 (1)	Mostapha al-Turk	TKO (punches)	UFC 99	June 13, 2009	1	3:06	Cologne, Germany	
Win	24–6–2 (1)	Choi Hong-man	TKO (leg kick)	Dynamite!! 2008	December 31, 2008	1	6:32	Saitama, Japan	
NC	23–6–2 (1)	Alistair Overeem	NC (knee to the groin)	Dream 6	September 23, 2008	1	6:09	Saitama, Japan	Cro Cop rendered unable to continue due to an illegal groin strike.
Win	23–6–2	Tatsuya Mizuno	TKO (punches)	Dream 1	March 15, 2008	1	0:56	Saitama, Japan	
Loss	22–6–2	Cheick Kongo	Decision (unanimous)	UFC 75	September 8, 2007	3	5:00	London, United Kingdom	
Loss	22–5–2	Gabriel Gonzaga	KO (head kick)	UFC 70	April 21, 2007	1	4:51	Manchester, United Kingdom	UFC Heavyweight title eliminator.
Win	22–4–2	Eddie Sanchez	TKO (punches)	UFC 67	February 3, 2007	1	4:33	Las Vegas, Nevada, United States	
Win	21–4–2	Josh Barnett	TKO (submission to punches)	Pride Conflict Absolute	September 10, 2006	1	7:32	Saitama, Japan	Won the 2006 Pride Openweight Grand Prix.
Win	20–4–2	Wanderlei Silva	KO (head kick)	Pride Conflict Absolute	September 10, 2006	1	5:22	Saitama, Japan	2006 Pride Openweight Grand Prix Semifinal. Knockout of the Year (2006).
Win	19–4–2	Hidehiko Yoshida	TKO (leg kicks)	Pride Countdown Absolute	July 1, 2006	1	7:38	Saitama, Japan	2006 Pride Openweight Grand Prix Quarterfinal.
Win	18–4–2	Ikuhisa Minowa	TKO (punches)	Pride Elimination Absolute	May 5, 2006	1	1:10	Osaka, Japan	2006 Pride Openweight Grand Prix First Round.
Loss	17–4–2	Mark Hunt	Decision (split)	Pride Shockwave 2005	December 31, 2005	3	5:00	Saitama, Japan	
Win	17–3–2	Josh Barnett	Decision (unanimous)	Pride 30: Fully Loaded	October 23, 2005	3	5:00	Saitama, Japan	
Loss	16–3–2	Fedor Emelianenko	Decision (unanimous)	Pride Conflict 2005	August 28, 2005	3	5:00	Saitama, Japan	For the Pride Heavyweight Championship. Fight of the Year (2005).
Win	16–2–2	Ibragim Magomedov	KO (kick to the body)	Pride Countdown 2005	June 26, 2005	1	3:53	Saitama, Japan	
Win	15–2–2	Mark Coleman	KO (punches and soccer kick)	Pride 29: Fists of Fire	February 20, 2005	1	3:40	Saitama, Japan	
Win	14–2–2	Kevin Randleman	Submission (guillotine choke)	Pride Shockwave 2004	December 31, 2004	1	0:41	Saitama, Japan	
Win	13–2–2	Josh Barnett	TKO (shoulder injury)	Pride 28: High Octane	October 31, 2004	1	0:46	Saitama, Japan	
Win	12–2–2	Alexander Emelianenko	KO (head kick and punches)	Pride Final Conflict 2004	August 15, 2004	1	2:09	Saitama, Japan	
Win	11–2–2	Shungo Oyama	KO (punches and soccer kick)	Pride Bushido 4	July 19, 2004	1	1:00	Nagoya, Japan	
Win	10–2–2	Hiromitsu Kanehara	Decision (unanimous)	Pride Bushido 3	May 23, 2004	2	5:00	Yokohama, Japan	
Loss	9–2–2	Kevin Randleman	KO (punches)	Pride Total Elimination 2004	April 25, 2004	1	1:57	Saitama, Japan	2004 Pride Heavyweight Grand Prix 1st Round.
Win	9–1–2	Yoshihisa Yamamoto	KO (punches)	Pride Bushido 2	February 15, 2004	1	2:12	Yokohama, Japan	
Win	8–1–2	Ron Waterman	TKO (soccer kicks)	Pride 27: Inferno	February 1, 2004	1	4:37	Osaka, Japan	
Loss	7–1–2	Antônio Rodrigo Nogueira	Submission (armbar)	Pride Final Conflict 2003	November 9, 2003	2	1:45	Tokyo, Japan	For the Interim Pride Heavyweight Championship. Fight of the Year (2003).
Win	7–0–2	Dos Caras Jr.	KO (head kick)	Pride Bushido 1	October 5, 2003	1	0:46	Saitama, Japan	
Win	6–0–2	Igor Vovchanchyn	KO (head kick)	Pride Total Elimination 2003	August 10, 2003	1	1:29	Saitama, Japan	Knockout of the Year (2003).
Win	5–0–2	Heath Herring	TKO (body kick and punches)	Pride 26: Bad to the Bone	June 8, 2003	1	3:17	Yokohama, Japan	
Win	4–0–2	Kazuyuki Fujita	Decision (unanimous)	Inoki Bom-Ba-Ye 2002	December 31, 2002	3	5:00	Saitama, Japan	
Win	3–0–2	Kazushi Sakuraba	TKO (doctor stoppage)	Pride Shockwave Dynamite!	August 28, 2002	2	5:00	Tokyo, Japan	
Draw	2–0–2	Wanderlei Silva	Draw (time limit)	Pride 20: Armed and Ready	April 28, 2002	5	3:00	Yokohama, Japan	Fought under special rules.
Win	2–0–1	Yuji Nagata	TKO (punches)	Inoki Bom-Ba-Ye 2001	December 31, 2001	1	0:21	Saitama, Japan	
Draw	1–0–1	Nobuhiko Takada	Draw (time limit)	Pride 17: Champions Chaos	November 3, 2001	5	3:00	Tokyo, Japan	Fought under special rules.
Win	1–0	Kazuyuki Fujita	TKO (cut)	K-1 Andy Memorial 2001 Japan	August 19, 2001	1	0:39	Saitama, Japan	

== Kickboxing record ==
Kickboxing record
26 wins (13 (T)KOs, 12 decisions, 1 unknown), 8 losses (4 (T)KOs, 4 decisions)
Date	Result	Opponent	Event	Location	Method	Round	Time	Record
2014-06-21	Win	(United States) Jarrell Miller	Glory 17: Los Angeles	Inglewood, California	Decision (unanimous)	3	3:00	26–8
2014-03-08	Loss	(Netherlands) Remy Bonjasky	Glory 14: Zagreb	Zagreb, Croatia	Decision (majority)	3	3:00	25–8
2013-03-15	Win	(Suriname) Ismael Londt	K-1 World Grand Prix FINAL in Zagreb, Final	Zagreb, Croatia	Decision (unanimous)	3	3:00	25–7
Wins the K-1 World Grand Prix FINAL in Zagreb title.
2013-03-15	Win	(Ukraine) Pavel Zhuravlev	K-1 World Grand Prix FINAL in Zagreb, Semi Finals	Zagreb, Croatia	Decision (unanimous)	3	3:00	24–7
2013-03-15	Win	(United States) Jarrell Miller	K-1 World Grand Prix FINAL in Zagreb, Quarter Finals	Zagreb, Croatia	Decision (unanimous)	3	3:00	23–7
2012-10-14	Win	(United States) Randy Blake	K-1 World Grand Prix 2012 in Tokyo final 16, First Round	Tokyo, Japan	Decision (majority)	3	3:00	22–7
2012-05-27	Win	(Spain) Loren Javier Jorge	K-1 World MAX 2012 Tournament Final 16, Super Fight	Madrid, Spain	KO (left uppercut)	2	2:23	21–7
2012-03-10	Win	(New Zealand) Ray Sefo	Cro Cop Final Fight	Zagreb, Croatia	Decision (unanimous)	3	3:00	20–7
2003-03-30	Win	(United States) Bob Sapp	K-1 World Grand Prix 2003 in Saitama	Saitama, Japan	KO (left cross)	1	1:26	19–7
2002-06-14	Win	(Netherlands) Remy Bonjasky	K-1 World Grand Prix 2002 in Fukuoka	Fukuoka, Japan	TKO (high kick and punches)	2	2:06	18–7
2002-03-03	Win	(New Zealand) Mark Hunt	K-1 World Grand Prix 2002 in Nagoya	Nagoya, Japan	Decision (unanimous)	5	3:00	17–7
2002-01-27	Win	(Japan) Ryushi Yanagisawa	K-1 Rising 2002	Shizuoka, Japan	TKO (doctor stoppage)	1	2:44	16–7
2001-06-16	Loss	(Canada) Michael McDonald	K-1 World Grand Prix 2001 in Melbourne	Melbourne, Australia	TKO (referee stoppage)	1	1:24	15–7
2001-03-17	Win	(Netherlands) Peter Aerts	K-1 Gladiators 2001	Yokohama, Japan	Decision (majority)	5	3:00	15–6
2001-01-30	Win	(Japan) Tatsufumi Tomihara	K-1 Rising 2001	Matsuyama, Japan	TKO (referee stoppage)	2	2:55	14–6
2000-12-10	Loss	(Netherlands) Ernesto Hoost	K-1 World Grand Prix 2000 Final	Tokyo, Japan	Ext.R decision (unanimous)	4	3:00	13–6
2000-10-09	Loss	(South Africa) Mike Bernardo	K-1 World Grand Prix 2000 in Fukuoka	Fukuoka, Japan	TKO (corner stoppage)	1	1:07	13–5
Fight was for the K-1 World Grand Prix 2000 in Fukuoka title.
2000-10-09	Win	(Japan) Hiromi Amada	K-1 World Grand Prix 2000 in Fukuoka	Fukuoka, Japan	Decision (unanimous)	3	3:00	13–4
2000-10-09	Win	(Brazil) Glaube Feitosa	K-1 World Grand Prix 2000 in Fukuoka	Fukuoka, Japan	Decision (unanimous)	3	3:00	12–4
2000-09-01	Win	(United Kingdom) Stuart Green	K-1 Grand Prix Europe 2000	Zagreb, Croatia	TKO (high kick)	2	2:51	11–4
2000-06-03	Loss	(Switzerland) Andy Hug	K-1 Fight Night 2000	Zurich, Switzerland	Decision (unanimous)	5	3:00	10–4
Fight was for the WKA World Muay Thai Super Heavyweight title.
2000-03-19	Win	(Japan) Hiromi Amada	K-1 Burning 2000	Yokohama, Japan	KO (left punch)	4	2:51	10–3
1999-12-05	Loss	(Netherlands) Ernesto Hoost	K-1 Grand Prix 1999 final	Tokyo, Japan	KO (left body shot)	3	1:13	9–3
Fight was for K-1 Grand Prix 1999 title.
1999-12-05	Win	(Australia) Sam Greco	K-1 Grand Prix 1999 semi-finals	Tokyo, Japan	TKO (referee stoppage)	2	2:50	9–2
1999-12-05	Win	(Japan) Musashi	K-1 Grand Prix 1999 quarter-finals	Tokyo, Japan	TKO (referee stoppage)	2	1:09	8–2
1999-10-05	Win	(South Africa) Mike Bernardo	K-1 World Grand Prix '99 opening round	Osaka, Japan	TKO (3 knockdowns)	1	1:20	7–2
Qualifies for K-1 Grand Prix 1999 final.
1999-06-20	Loss	(Switzerland) Xhavit Bajrami	K-1 Braves '99 semi-finals	Fukuoka, Japan	Ext.R decision (unanimous)	4	3:00	6–2
1999-06-20	Win	(United Kingdom) Ricky Nicholson	K-1 Braves '99 quarter-finals	Fukuoka, Japan	KO (high kick)	1	1:20	6–1
1999-04-25	Win	(South Africa) Jan Nortje	K-1 Revenge '99	Yokohama, Japan	KO (left hook)	4	1:58	5–1
1997-10	Win	(France) Achille Roger	Kickboxing Tournament Prague 1997 Final	Prague, Czech Republic	Decision (unanimous)	6	2:00	4–1
Wins Prague 1997 Kickboxing 8-man tournament.
1997-10	Win	N/A	Kickboxing Tournament Prague 1997 Semi Finals	Prague, Czech Republic	Achille Roger	N/A	N/A	3–1
1997-10	Win	(United Kingdom) Lee Hasdell	Kickboxing Tournament Prague 1997 Quarter Finals	Prague, Czech Republic	TKO (doctor stoppage)	2	N/A	2–1
1996-05-06	Loss	(Netherlands) Ernesto Hoost	K-1 Grand Prix 1996 Final Quarter Finals	Yokohama, Japan	KO (right low kick)	3	1:27	1–1
1996-03-10	Win	(France) Jérôme Le Banner	K-1 Grand Prix '96 Opening Battle	Yokohama, Japan	Decision (unanimous)	5	3:00	1–0
Qualifies for K-1 Grand Prix 1996 final.
Legend: Win Loss Draw/no contest Notes

== See also ==
- List of male kickboxers
- List of male mixed martial artists
