= Paul Zadro =

Australian martial artist

- Born: 15 March 1963 (age 63); Innisfail, North Queensland
- Occupations: ISKA Australian President and NSW Operations Manager
- Known for: Martial arts

Paul Zadro (born 15 March 1963, at Innisfail, in Northern Queensland), is an Australian martial artist, sport administrator and promoter. He is currently the chairman of the International Sports Karate Association in Australia and an 8th Degree Black Belt in Kempo Karate.

== Background ==
Zadro started boxing under Jimmy Sharman in 1972 at Mareeba, North Queensland, and he trained in Judo under the Kodokan Judo Association from 1973 to 1975. After moving to Sydney with his family, he studied Tae Kwon Do from 1975 to 1979 at the Marconi Club in Bossley Park, and attained the rank of Junior Black Belt. In 1979 he went on to study Ken Sei Kan Karate Do and continued on until 1981 at Greystanes, Sydney where he attained the rank of Shodan (first degree black belt). From 1979 to 1983 he also studied Koshu Kempo under Tony Lucisano at Bossley Park, Sydney and he also attained the rank of Shodan in that art. He studied Brazilian jiu-jujitsu with good friend Anthony Perosh. Perosh still states that Paul was his first instructor until he went overseas to pursue Brazilian jiu-jujitsu. He was awarded his Sandan (third degree black belt) by the International Kempo Karate Academy in 1983, and Godan (fifth degree black belt) by WCMA in 1995.

He currently runs and owns the IMC (International Martial Arts Centers). He is one of the longest-serving martial artist teachers in Sydney.

== Sport promotion and administration ==
Zadro competed in full-contact tournaments in the 1980s, but he became concerned that they were limiting the broad appeal of the sport. "Kids, women, and people who wanted to compete without getting beat up so they could go to work the next day – they didn’t really have anything that catered to them". So he adapted the format of the Internationals from Long Beach to create the new World Cup competition circuit.

He was the promoter for the World Cup of Martial Arts in 1995, 1998 and 1999. He has been the promoter of the C.C.P. International tournament eight times, from 1992 through to 1999. In 2008, he again organized the World Cup, this time in Australia, attracting 1000 competitors from 16 countries.

In 1995 Zadro was appointed the NSW President of the International Sport Karate Association ISKA; he is now the Australasia President and NSW Operations Manager.

== Recognition and awards ==
In 1998 Zadro was awarded Promoter of the Year and inducted into the Eurasian Kickboxing Association Hall of Fame. In 1999 he was inducted into the International Martial Arts Hall of Fame and the Australasian Martial Arts Hall of Fame, as well as being their "karate promoter of the year".

In May 2014 he was featured on the cover of Blitz magazine and in the major article, "Paul Zadro: International Man of Mastery".

== Notable students ==
- Peter Graham, mixed martial artist
- Anthony Perosh, mixed martial artist
