= UFC 147 =

UFC mixed martial arts event in 2012

UFC 147: Silva vs. Franklin II
- The poster for UFC 147: Silva vs. Franklin II
- Promotion: Ultimate Fighting Championship
- Date: June 23, 2012
- Venue: Mineirinho Arena
- City: Belo Horizonte, Brazil
- Attendance: 16,643
- Buyrate: 140,000

Event chronology
UFC on FX: Maynard vs. Guida	UFC 147: Silva vs. Franklin II	UFC 148: Silva vs. Sonnen II

UFC 147: Silva vs. Franklin II was a mixed martial arts pay-per-view event held by the Ultimate Fighting Championship on June 23, 2012, at Mineirinho Arena in Belo Horizonte, Brazil.

== Background ==
The finals in the featherweight and middleweight tournaments of The Ultimate Fighter: Brazil were held on this card. Daniel Sarafian was originally scheduled to compete in the Middleweight finals, but pulled out due to injury. He was replaced by semifinalist Sérgio Moraes. Renee Forte, a Middleweight for Team Wanderlei, was scheduled to fight Moraes, but was removed from the card when Moraes was enlisted to fill in for Sarafian. UFC Officials have promised Forte a fight on a future UFC card.

This event also saw other significant changes to its original card. The expected rematch between Anderson Silva and Chael Sonnen was moved to UFC 148 on July 7, 2012 in Las Vegas, Nevada and the expected co-feature of the Brazilian event, a rematch between Vitor Belfort and Wanderlei Silva was to headline the event. On April 24, the changes regarding Silva/Sonnen were confirmed. Plans were then being made for Featherweight champion José Aldo, who was scheduled to defend his title at UFC 149, to headline this event. However, it was reported April 28, 2012, that Aldo would remain on the UFC 149 card and defend his title against Erik Koch.

On May 26, Vitor Belfort was forced to pull out of the card after breaking his left hand while training. Silva's opponent was changed to Rich Franklin in a 190 lb catchweight bout. Franklin and Silva faced each other previously in June 2009 at UFC 99, where Franklin defeated Silva via unanimous decision in a bout that earned both participants Fight of the Night honors.

Due to the multitude of changes to the main card, the UFC offered a full refund for any ticket-holder no longer wanting to see the event live. This is the first time in the promotion's history that a full refund for an event has been offered before the event took place, and the window for receiving the refund was only three days: 18 June 2012 to 20 June 2012.

== Results ==
Main Card
Weight class				Method	Round	Time	Notes
Catchweight (190 lb)	Rich Franklin	def.	Wanderlei Silva	Decision (unanimous) (49–46, 49–46, 49–46)	5	5:00
Middleweight	Cezar Ferreira	def.	Sérgio Moraes	Decision (unanimous) (29–28, 30–27, 30–27)	3	5:00	(Note: TUF Brazil Middleweight Tournament final bout. Daniel Sarafian was replaced by Sérgio Moraes due to an injury.)
Featherweight	Rony Jason	def.	Godofredo Pepey	Decision (unanimous) (29–28, 29–28, 29–28)	3	5:00	(Note: TUF Brazil Featherweight Tournament final bout.)
Heavyweight	Fabrício Werdum	def.	Mike Russow	TKO (punches)	1	2:28
Featherweight	Hacran Dias	def.	Iuri Alcântara	Decision (unanimous) (29–28, 30–27, 30–27)	3	5:00
Preliminary Card (FX)
Featherweight	Rodrigo Damm	def.	Anistavio Medeiros	Submission (rear-naked choke)	1	2:12
Middleweight	Francisco Trinaldo	def.	Delson Heleno	TKO (punches)	1	4:21
Catchweight (150 lb)	Hugo Viana	def.	John Teixeira	Decision (split) (29–28, 28–29, 29–28)	3	5:00
Middleweight	Thiago Perpétuo	def.	Leonardo Mafra	TKO (punches)	3	0:41
Preliminary Card (Facebook)
Featherweight	Marcos Vinicius	def.	Wagner Campos	TKO (punches)	3	1:04
Featherweight	Felipe Arantes	vs.	Milton Vieira	Draw (split) (28–29, 29–28, 28–28)	3	5:00

== Bonus Awards ==
The following fighters received $65,000.

- Fight of the Night: Wanderlei Silva vs. Rich Franklin
- Knockout of the Night: Marcos Vinicius
- Submission of the Night: Rodrigo Damm

== See also ==
- List of UFC events
- 2012 in UFC
