= Luiz Carlos Dórea =

Brazilian boxing and mixed martial arts trainer

Luiz Carlos Dórea Barreto
- Born: Luiz Carlos Dórea Barreto; March 7, 1965 (age 61); Salvador, Bahia, Brazil
- Nationality: Brazilian
- Division: Welterweight; Light welterweight
- Team: Academia Champion; Team Nogueira

Professional boxing record
- Total: 9
- Wins: 6
- By knockout: 3
- Losses: 2
- By knockout: 2
- Draws: 1
- No contests: 0

Other information
- Occupation: Boxing and MMA trainer Civil police investigator
- Notable students: Acelino Freitas; Éverton Lopes; Adriana Araújo; Antônio Rodrigo Nogueira; Antônio Rogério Nogueira; Junior dos Santos; Anderson Silva; Lyoto Machida; Vitor Belfort; Demian Maia; Robson Conceição; Pedro Lima; Valdemir Pereira; Hugo Viana
- Boxing record from BoxRec

Luiz Carlos Dórea Barreto (born March 7, 1965) is a boxing and mixed martial arts trainer from Brazil and is also a retired boxer. He trained many boxers like Acelino Freitas, Éverton Lopes and Adriana Araújo and mixed martial artists like Anderson Silva, Junior dos Santos, Antônio Rodrigo Nogueira and Antônio Rogério Nogueira.

== Boxing and MMA training career ==
=== Early training camp and founding of Champion academy ===
Dórea started as a trainer in 1988, after the decease of his boxing trainer. He decided to open a training camp on his garage, just for practicing. At 1990, he founded the academy Champion (Academia Champion/Champion Team). It began to grow over the years and quickly gained the fame of being the root to many of the greatest Brazilian boxers.

=== Trainer titles: Boxing and MMA world titles and olympic medal ===
Dórea was the trainer of Acelino Freitas (Popó). He earned a Pan American silver medal in 1995 in Mar del Plata and won multiple titles in WBO and WBA between 1999 and 2006.

Dórea trains former UFC Middleweight Champion Anderson Silva since 2003. He trains also Junior dos Santos.

Dórea was the first trainer of Antônio Rodrigo Nogueira (Minotauro), but in 1994 he left to the United States to practice and teach Brazilian Jiu-Jitsu and was distant during the earning of his RINGS and Pride FC titles. Dórea asked to Nogueira come back to train with him only after 2002. Nogueira later won the UFC Interim Heavyweight Championship.

As a Nogueira's partner, Junior dos Santos (Cigano) was also trained by Dórea for all of his UFC bouts, including his victory over Cain Velasquez for the Heavyweight championship and all title defenses.

Dórea was also the boxing coach for Team dos Santos in The Ultimate Fighter: Team Lesnar vs. Team dos Santos, for Team Vitor in The Ultimate Fighter: Brazil and for Team Nogueira in The Ultimate Fighter: Brazil 2.

In the Olympic Games, Dórea was a Brazilian boxing coach for Athens 2004, Beijing 2008 and London 2012. Adriana Araújo, Dórea's student, earned a bronze medal in London 2012.

== Other occupations ==
Dórea is a civil police investigator and was a city councillor candidate for the city of Salvador in the Brazilian 2012 elections.

== Boxing record ==
6 Wins (3 knockouts, 3 decisions), 2 Losses (2 knockouts), 1 Draw
Res.	Record	Opponent	Type	Round	Date	Location	Notes
Loss	6–2–1	(Australia) Lester Ellis	TKO	3 (10)	1990-02-14	Festival Hall, Melbourne, Victoria, Australia	
Loss	6–1–1	(Italy) Salvatore Nardino	TKO	6 (12)	1989-10-28	Fano, Marche, Italy	For WBC International light welterweight title.
Win	6–0–1	Alejandro Balsamo	PTS	10	1989-03-10	Salvador, Bahia, Brazil	
Win	5–0–1	(Paraguay) Domingo Guzman Nunez	TKO	5 (12)	1988-06-10	Salvador, Bahia, Brazil	Retained WBC International welterweight title.
Win	4–0–1	(Australia) Tony Jones	PTS	12	1988-02-26	Salvador, Bahia, Brazil	Won WBC International welterweight title.
Win	3–0–1	(United States) Billy Wooten	TKO	3 (10)	1987-12-11	Brazil	
Win	2–0–1	(Argentina) Alfredo Yvan Ayala	PTS	10	1987-10-08	Salvador, Bahia, Brazil	
Win	1–0–1	(Brazil) Jesse Maciel	TKO	10 (12)	1987-08-14	Brazil	
Draw	0–0–1	(Brazil) Francisco Mesquita Pereira	PTS	6	1986-12-07	Hotel Quatro Rodas, Salvador, Bahia, Brazil	
