= UFC Fight Night: Belfort vs. Henderson 2 =

UFC mixed martial arts event in 2013

- The poster for UFC Fight Night: Belfort vs. Henderson 2
- Promotion: Ultimate Fighting Championship
- Date: November 9, 2013
- Venue: Goiânia Arena
- City: Goiânia, Brazil
- Attendance: 10,565

Event chronology
UFC: Fight for the Troops 3	UFC Fight Night: Belfort vs. Henderson 2	UFC 167: St-Pierre vs. Hendricks

UFC Fight Night: Belfort vs. Henderson 2 (also known as UFC Fight Night 32) was a mixed martial arts event held on November 9, 2013, at the Goiânia Arena in Goiânia, Brazil. The event was broadcast live on Fox Sports 1.

== Background ==
The event was headlined by a rematch between longtime multi-divisional contenders Vitor Belfort and Dan Henderson. Henderson defeated Belfort in their first encounter in 2006 at Pride 32 in a unanimous decision.

The co-main event featured the long-awaited bout between The Ultimate Fighter: Brazil competitors Cezar Ferreira and Daniel Sarafian. Both men were originally scheduled to face each other in the finale to determine the winner of the inaugural TUF series for Brazil. However, Sarafian injured himself before the finale in June 2012 and was forced out of the finals.

Thiago Tavares was expected to face Quinn Mulhern at the event. However, Mulhern pulled out of the bout citing an injury and was replaced by Justin Salas.

Johnny Eduardo and Lucas Martins were originally scheduled to face each other in a bantamweight bout on this card. However, both fighters were injured and the fight was removed from the event.

== Results ==
Main Card (Fox Sports 1)
Weight class				Method	Round	Time	Notes
Light Heavyweight	Vitor Belfort	def.	Dan Henderson	KO (head kick)	1	1:17
Middleweight	Cezar Ferreira	def.	Daniel Sarafian	Decision (split) (28–29, 30–27, 30–28)	3	5:00
Light Heavyweight	Rafael Cavalcante	def.	Igor Pokrajac	TKO (submission to knees and punches)	1	1:18
Welterweight	Brandon Thatch	def.	Paulo Thiago	TKO (punches)	1	2:10
Welterweight	Ryan LaFlare	def.	Santiago Ponzinibbio	Decision (unanimous) (30–27, 30–27, 30–27)	3	5:00
Featherweight	Jeremy Stephens	def.	Rony Jason	KO (head kick)	1	0:40
Preliminary card (Online Prelims)
Featherweight	Sam Sicilia	def.	Godofredo Pepey	TKO (punches)	1	1:42
Middleweight	Omari Akhmedov	def.	Thiago Perpétuo	KO (punches)	1	3:31	(Note: This bout aired on the broadcast following the Cavalcante vs Pokrajac bout.)
Lightweight	Thiago Tavares	def.	Justin Salas	Submission (rear-naked choke)	1	2:38
Lightweight	Adriano Martins	def.	Daron Cruickshank	Submission (kimura)	2	2:49
Flyweight	Dustin Ortiz	def.	Jose Maria Tome	TKO (punches)	3	3:19

== Bonus awards ==
The following fighters received $50,000 bonuses.

- Fight of the Night: Omari Akhmedov vs. Thiago Perpétuo
- Knockout of the Night: Vitor Belfort
- Submission of the Night: Adriano Martins

== See also ==
- List of UFC events
- 2013 in UFC
