= C. B. Dollaway =

American collegiate wrestler and mixed martial arts fighter

- Born: August 10, 1983 (age 43); Battle Creek, Michigan, U.S.
- Other names: The Doberman
- Height: 6 ft 2 in (1.88 m)
- Weight: 185 lb (84 kg; 13 st 3 lb)
- Division: Middleweight; Light Heavyweight (current)
- Reach: 76 in (193 cm)
- Stance: Orthodox
- Fighting out of: Tempe, Arizona
- Team: Arizona Combat Sports (2006–2010); Power MMA And Fitness (2011–present)
- Rank: Black belt in Brazilian Jiu-Jitsu
- Wrestling: NCAA Division I Wrestling
- Years active: 2006–present

Mixed martial arts record
- Total: 27
- Wins: 17
- By knockout: 6
- By submission: 3
- By decision: 7
- By disqualification: 1
- Losses: 10
- By knockout: 6
- By submission: 2
- By decision: 2

Other information
- University: Colby Community College
- Spouse: Samar Riaz
- Notable school: Northmor High School
- Website: http://www.cbdollaway.com/
- Mixed martial arts record from Sherdog

C. B. Dollaway (born August 10, 1983) is an American retired mixed martial artist who fought in the Light Heavyweight division. A professional from 2006 to 2019, he formerly fought in the UFC and was a finalist on SpikeTV's The Ultimate Fighter 7.

== Early life ==
Dollaway graduated from Northmor High School near Galion, Ohio where he was a state champion wrestler in the 171 lb weight class. After high school Dollaway attended Colby Community College in Colby, Kansas. While at Colby, Dollaway won the JUCO National Championships. Soon after, Dollaway moved to Tempe, Arizona to attend Arizona State University where he earned a bachelor's degree in interdisciplinary studies with a concentration in sociology and justice studies. Wrestling since the age of five, Dollaway continued the sport at Arizona State University, earning All-American status in 2006, taking 5th place in the 184 lb. bracket as a tenth seed.

Dollaway left Arizona Combat Sports to train at Power MMA and Fitness with The Ultimate Fighter 8 Light Heavyweight winner Ryan Bader.

== Mixed martial arts career ==
=== The Ultimate Fighter ===
Dollaway appeared on the seventh season of the reality television series The Ultimate Fighter. He earned a spot on the show when he defeated David Baggett by TKO. Rampage Jackson won the initial coin toss and decided to pick the first fighter, Dollaway. Dollaway did not have his first fight until the last preliminary fight, going up against Nick Klein. Dollaway defeated Klein by guillotine choke in the second round. Dollaway then went on to fight Cale Yarbrough in the quarter-finals. Dollaway won the fight by TKO in the first round. Dollaway's next opponent was the future winner of the show Amir Sadollah, Sadollah won by an armbar submission in the third round. After Jesse Taylor was forced out of the show, Dana White needed someone to fight Sadollah in the finale. Dollaway and Tim Credeur fought to see who would be in the finale. After three rounds, Dollaway won by unanimous decision. Sadollah defeated Dollaway for the second time by armbar to win the show. Although it appeared that Dollaway had tapped, shortly after the fight he proclaimed he did not in fact tap, which Joe Rogan disputed.

=== Ultimate Fighting Championship ===
Following up on his loss at The Ultimate Finale, where he was runner-up, he was offered a fight against fellow TUF season 7 fighter Jesse Taylor at UFC Fight Night: Silva vs. Irvin where he won by Peruvian necktie in the first round. This was the first time in UFC history this submission was successfully used and earned Dollaway Submission of the Night honors.

At UFC 92, Dollaway returned to action, for his eighth fight of 2008, against Mike Massenzio, a fighter who he had formerly defeated in his Junior College wrestling career. Dollaway defeated Massenzio by TKO due to punches at 3:01 of the first round. After being stunned by a Massenzio punch and nearly being caught in a guillotine choke, Dollaway secured top position, took Massenzio's back and pounded his opponent with punches until the referee halted the bout. After the stoppage Dollaway celebrated with a howl similar to that of his coach on The Ultimate Fighter, Quinton Jackson. Massenzio later stated that Dollaway tapped out during their match.

Dollaway had his fourth fight for the UFC taking on Tom Lawlor at UFC 100 on the preliminary card. In the beginning of the bout, Dollaway shot in for a takedown but was quickly ensnared in a guillotine choke. Lawlor tightly locked the hold, and moments later Lawlor looked up to the ref stating Dollaway had lost consciousness, ending the bout 55 seconds into the first round.

He was scheduled to fight Dan Miller on September 16, 2009, at UFC Fight Night 19. However, Miller got an infection and had to withdraw. Newcomer Jay Silva was named as his replacement. Dollaway outwrestled Silva for three rounds, winning a unanimous decision.

Dollaway next faced Goran Reljic on February 21, 2010, at UFC 110. Dollaway was able to win via unanimous decision, with all three judges scoring the bout 29–28.

Dollaway faced Joe Doerksen on September 25, 2010, at UFC 119. Dollaway defeated Doerksen by modified guillotine choke at 2:47 of the opening frame. In this bout, Dollaway showed exceptional grappling skills, locking on to an arm in guillotine and trying to submit his opponent. Then a scrambled ensued, with Dollaway switching to a Peruvian Necktie choke from the mount and forcing Doerksen to tap. He was awarded his second Submission of the Night award for this victory.

Dollaway faced Mark Muñoz on March 3, 2011, at UFC Live: Sanchez vs. Kampmann and lost by KO for the first time in his career at only 54 seconds of the first round.

Dollaway was defeated via second-round TKO by Jared Hamman on August 14, 2011, at UFC on Versus 5.

Dollaway faced Jason Miller on May 26, 2012, at UFC 146. He weathered the striking of Miller at the beginning of each round and used his wrestling and ground and pound to control the latter part of the rounds, en route to a unanimous decision victory. In a post-fight interview, with Ariel Helwani, Dollaway stated that he was happy with his performance, and that the win was big for his career. However, many fans were disappointed with Dollaway for having held Mayhem down for almost the entirety of the fight without having mounted much offense.

Dollaway defeated Daniel Sarafian on January 19, 2013, at UFC on FX: Belfort vs. Bisping. The exciting three round affair earned both fighters the 'Fight of the Night' bonus.

Dollaway was expected to face Cezar Ferreira on May 18, 2013, at UFC on FX 8. However, Dollaway pulled out of the bout citing an injury and was replaced by Chris Camozzi.

Dollaway faced Tim Boetsch on October 19, 2013, at UFC 166, replacing an injured Luke Rockhold. While Dollaway seemingly controlled the action for the majority of the bout, he was docked a point for multiple eye pokes to Boetsch and lost the fight via split decision.

A bout with Cezar Ferreira eventually took place on March 23, 2014, at UFC Fight Night 38. Dollaway won the fight via KO in the first round.

Dollaway faced Francis Carmont on May 31, 2014, at UFC Fight Night 41. He won the fight by unanimous decision. The win also earned Dollaway his first Performance of the Night bonus award. This also marks the first time the UFC promotion has given a Performance of the Night bonus to a fighter who won their fight by decision.

Dollaway faced Lyoto Machida on December 20, 2014, at UFC Fight Night 58. He lost via TKO in the first round.

Dollaway faced Michael Bisping on April 25, 2015, at UFC 186. Despite dropping Bisping in the first round, Dollaway lost the fight by unanimous decision.

Dollaway next faced Nate Marquardt on December 19, 2015, at UFC on Fox 17. After a back-and-forth first round, Dollaway lost the fight via knockout in the second round.

Dollaway was expected to face Francimar Barroso in a light heavyweight bout on September 10, 2016, at UFC 203. However, on the day of the event, Dollaway suffered a back injury at his hotel due to a malfunctioning elevator and was unable to participate. As a result, Barroso was also removed from the event.

After nineteen months away from competition, Dollaway faced Ed Herman on July 7, 2017, at The Ultimate Fighter 25 Finale. He won the back-and-forth bout via unanimous decision.

Dollaway returned to middleweight and faced Héctor Lombard on March 3, 2018, at UFC 222. Dollaway won the fight after Lombard clearly landed two intentional strikes to Dollaway after the end of the first round, knocking him down. Lombard was disqualified and Dollaway was given the victory whilst outside the octagon.

Dollaway was scheduled to face Omari Akhmedov on September 15, 2018, at UFC Fight Night 136. However, Akhmedov pulled out of the fight in early September and was briefly replaced by promotional newcomer Artem Frolov. In turn, after just three days, Frolov backed out of the fight citing lingering injuries, and he was replaced by Khalid Murtazaliev. Dollaway lost the fight via TKO at the end of the second round.

On August 16, 2019, it was reported that Dollaway tested positive for anastrozole, a growth hormone releasing peptide 2 (GHRP-2 or pralmorelin); a metabolite of GHRP-2; and GHRP-6, on a sample collected on December 19, 2018. In addition, tested positive for clomiphene on an out-of-competition sample collected on February 9, 2019. Dollaway also tested positive for receiving intravenous (IV) infusion over the allowable limits in December 2018. As a result, Dollaway was suspended for 2 years by USADA retroactive from December 13, 2018, becoming eligible to fight again on December 13, 2020. Dollaway indicated that he was unknowingly in contact with the substance from a stem cell procedure done in Mexico. In December 2019, news surfaced that after a 20-fight tenure Dollaway and the UFC had parted ways.

=== Post-UFC career ===
Dollaway challenged Jiří Procházka for the Rizin Light Heavyweight Championship at Rizin 20 on December 31, 2019. After a series of successful low kicks, Dollaway got caught by punches and lost the fight via knockout in the first round.

== Lawsuit against Endeavor ==
On June 24, 2021, news surfaced that Dollaway and Kajan Johnson had filed a lawsuit in Nevada Federal District Court against Endeavor, the parent company of the UFC. The plaintiffs allege that Zuffa violated antitrust laws by engaging in several anti-competitive practices.

== Championships and accomplishments ==
=== Amateur wrestling ===
- USA Wrestling
  - Cliff Keen Las Vegas Invitational 184 lb: Runner-up out of Arizona State University (2004)
  - Reno Tournament of Champions 184 lb: Runner-up out of Arizona State University (2004)
- National Collegiate Athletic Association
  - NCAA Division I All-American out of Arizona State University (2006)
  - NCAA Division I 184 lb: 5th place out of Arizona State University (2006)
  - Pac-10 Conference 184 lb: Runner-up out of Arizona State University (2004–05)
- National Junior College Athletic Association
  - NJCAA Division I All-American out of Colby Community College (2003–04)
  - NJCAA Division I 184 lb: Champion out of Colby Community College (2003)
  - NJCAA Division I 184 lb: 3rd place out of Colby Community College (2004)
- National High School Coaches Association
  - High School All-American (2002)
  - NHSCA Senior National 171 lb: 4th place out of Northmor High School (2002)
- Ohio High School Athletic Association
  - Ohio State Wrestling Champion out of Northmor High School (2002)

=== Mixed martial arts ===
- Ultimate Fighting Championship
  - Fight of the Night (One time) vs. Daniel Sarafian
  - Performance of the Night (One time) vs. Francis Carmont
  - Submission of the Night (Two times) vs. Jesse Taylor and Joe Doerksen
  - UFC.com Awards
    - 2008: Ranked #10 Newcomer of the Year
    - 2010: Ranked #7 Submission of the Year vs. Joe Doerksen
    - 2012: Ranked #6 Upset of the Year vs. Jason Miller
- MMA Fighting
  - 2008 #3 Ranked UFC Submission of the Year vs. Jesse Taylor at UFC Fight Night: Silva vs. Irvin

== Mixed martial arts record ==
Professional record breakdown
27 matches	17 wins	10 losses
By knockout	6	6
By submission	3	2
By decision	7	2
By disqualification	1	0

Res.	Record	Opponent	Method	Event	Date	Round	Time	Location	Notes
Loss	17–10	Jiří Procházka	KO (punches)	Rizin 20	December 31, 2019	1	1:55	Saitama, Japan	For the Rizin Light Heavyweight Championship.
Loss	17–9	Khalid Murtazaliev	TKO (punches)	UFC Fight Night: Hunt vs. Oleinik	September 15, 2018	2	5:00	Moscow, Russia	
Win	17–8	Héctor Lombard	DQ (punches after the bell)	UFC 222	March 3, 2018	1	5:00	Las Vegas, Nevada, United States	Return to Middleweight. Lombard was disqualified after hitting Dollaway twice after the bell.
Win	16–8	Ed Herman	Decision (unanimous)	The Ultimate Fighter: Redemption Finale	July 7, 2017	3	5:00	Las Vegas, Nevada, United States	Light Heavyweight debut.
Loss	15–8	Nate Marquardt	KO (punch)	UFC on Fox: dos Anjos vs. Cowboy 2	December 19, 2015	2	0:28	Orlando, Florida, United States	
Loss	15–7	Michael Bisping	Decision (unanimous)	UFC 186	April 25, 2015	3	5:00	Montreal, Quebec, Canada	
Loss	15–6	Lyoto Machida	TKO (kick to the body and punches)	UFC Fight Night: Machida vs. Dollaway	December 20, 2014	1	1:02	Barueri, Brazil	
Win	15–5	Francis Carmont	Decision (unanimous)	UFC Fight Night: Muñoz vs. Mousasi	May 31, 2014	3	5:00	Berlin, Germany	Performance of the Night.
Win	14–5	Cezar Ferreira	KO (punches)	UFC Fight Night: Shogun vs. Henderson 2	March 23, 2014	1	0:39	Natal, Brazil	
Loss	13–5	Tim Boetsch	Decision (split)	UFC 166	October 19, 2013	3	5:00	Houston, Texas, United States	
Win	13–4	Daniel Sarafian	Decision (split)	UFC on FX: Belfort vs. Bisping	January 19, 2013	3	5:00	São Paulo, Brazil	Fight of the Night.
Win	12–4	Jason Miller	Decision (unanimous)	UFC 146	May 26, 2012	3	5:00	Las Vegas, Nevada, United States	
Loss	11–4	Jared Hamman	TKO (punches)	UFC Live: Hardy vs. Lytle	August 14, 2011	2	3:38	Milwaukee, Wisconsin, United States	
Loss	11–3	Mark Muñoz	KO (punches)	UFC Live: Sanchez vs. Kampmann	March 3, 2011	1	0:54	Louisville, Kentucky, United States	
Win	11–2	Joe Doerksen	Submission (guillotine choke)	UFC 119	September 25, 2010	1	2:13	Indianapolis, Indiana, United States	Submission of the Night.
Win	10–2	Goran Reljić	Decision (unanimous)	UFC 110	February 21, 2010	3	5:00	Sydney, Australia	
Win	9–2	Jay Silva	Decision (unanimous)	UFC Fight Night: Diaz vs. Guillard	September 16, 2009	3	5:00	Oklahoma City, Oklahoma, United States	
Loss	8–2	Tom Lawlor	Technical Submission (guillotine choke)	UFC 100	July 11, 2009	1	0:55	Las Vegas, Nevada, United States	
Win	8–1	Mike Massenzio	TKO (punches)	UFC 92	December 27, 2008	1	3:01	Las Vegas, Nevada, United States	
Win	7–1	Jesse Taylor	Submission (Peruvian necktie)	UFC Fight Night: Silva vs. Irvin	July 19, 2008	1	3:58	Las Vegas, Nevada, United States	Submission of the Night.
Loss	6–1	Amir Sadollah	Submission (armbar)	The Ultimate Fighter: Team Rampage vs. Team Forrest Finale	June 21, 2008	1	3:02	Las Vegas, Nevada, United States	The Ultimate Fighter: Team Rampage vs Team Forrest Middleweight Tournament final.
Win	6–0	Bill Smallwood	Submission (rear-naked choke)	SE: Vale Tudo	October 27, 2007	1	N/A	Mexico	
Win	5–0	Hans Marrero	TKO (knee and punches)	HDNet Fights 1	October 13, 2007	1	1:07	Dallas, Texas, United States	
Win	4–0	Joe Bunch	TKO (punches)	IFO: Wiuff vs. Salmon	September 1, 2007	2	4:31	Las Vegas, Nevada, United States	
Win	3–0	George Hartman	Decision (unanimous)	Rage in the Cage 94	April 28, 2007	3	3:00	Phoenix, Arizona, United States	
Win	2–0	Levi LaLonde	TKO (punches)	WFC: Desert Storm	March 31, 2007	1	2:40	Camp Verde, Arizona, United States	
Win	1–0	Chuck Pablo	TKO (slam)	Cage Fighting Federation	November 10, 2006	1	0:17	Albuquerque, New Mexico, United States	

=== Mixed martial arts exhibition record ===
Exhibition record breakdown		
5 matches	4 wins	1 loss
By knockout	2	0
By submission	1	1
By decision	1	0

Res.	Record	Opponent	Method	Event	Date	Round	Time	Location	Notes
Win	4–1	Tim Credeur	Decision (unanimous)	The Ultimate Fighter: Team Rampage vs. Team Forrest	June 18, 2008 (airdate)	3	5:00	Las Vegas, Nevada, United States	Semi-final replacement bout.
Loss	3–1	Amir Sadollah	Submission (armbar)	The Ultimate Fighter: Team Rampage vs. Team Forrest	June 18, 2008 (airdate)	3	2:50	Las Vegas, Nevada, United States	Semi-finals.
Win	3–0	Cale Yarbrough	TKO (punches)	The Ultimate Fighter: Team Rampage vs. Team Forrest	June 4, 2008 (airdate)	1	2:43	Las Vegas, Nevada, United States	Quarter-finals.
Win	2–0	Nick Klein	Submission (guillotine choke)	The Ultimate Fighter: Team Rampage vs. Team Forrest	May 21, 2008 (airdate)	2	2:41	Las Vegas, Nevada, United States	Preliminary bout.
Win	1–0	David Baggett	TKO (punches)	The Ultimate Fighter: Team Rampage vs. Team Forrest	April 2, 2008 (airdate)	1	1:29	Las Vegas, Nevada, United States	TUF 7 entry bout.

== See also ==
- List of current UFC fighters
- List of male mixed martial artists
