= UFC Fight Night: Shogun vs. Henderson 2 =

UFC mixed martial arts event in 2014

- The poster for UFC Fight Night: Shogun vs. Henderson 2
- Promotion: Ultimate Fighting Championship
- Date: March 23, 2014
- Venue: Ginásio Nélio Dias
- City: Natal, Brazil
- Attendance: 6,828

Event chronology
UFC 171: Hendricks vs. Lawler	UFC Fight Night: Shogun vs. Henderson 2	UFC Fight Night: Nogueira vs. Nelson

UFC Fight Night: Shogun vs. Henderson 2 (also known as UFC Fight Night 38) was a mixed martial arts event held on March 23, 2014, at the Ginásio Nélio Dias in Natal, Brazil.

== Background ==
The event was headlined by the anticipated rematch between mixed martial arts legends Maurício Rua and Dan Henderson. Henderson won their first encounter back in November 2011 at UFC 139 via unanimous decision in a bout lauded by many MMA pundits as the Fight of the Year for 2011 and one of the best bouts in the history of the UFC.

The co-main event featured a long-planned bout between Cezar Ferreira and C. B. Dollaway. The two were originally scheduled to meet on May 18, 2013 at UFC on FX 8. However, both Dollaway and Ferreira had been forced from the bout due to injury.

Gleison Tibau was expected to face Mairbek Taisumov at the event. However, Tibau pulled out of the bout citing injury and was replaced by Michel Prazeres.

Diego Brandao was expected to face Will Chope at the event and both men weighed in successfully on March 22 for the fight. However, after the weigh ins, the bout was cancelled when documents were released that showed Chope assaulted and threatened his ex-wife, which led to jail time and a dishonorable discharge from the U.S. Air Force.

At the weigh-ins, Ronny Markes weighed in at 190 pounds, 4 pounds over the middleweight non-title fight limit. His bout proceeded at catchweight and he was fined 20% of his purse, which went to his opponent Thiago Santos.

The card saw an average of 936,000 viewers with a peak of 1.25 million during the main event.

== Results ==
Main card (Fox Sports 1)
Weight class				Method	Round	Time	Notes
Light Heavyweight	Dan Henderson	def.	Maurício Rua	TKO (punches)	3	1:31
Middleweight	C. B. Dollaway	def.	Cezar Ferreira	TKO (punches)	1	0:39
Lightweight	Leonardo Santos	vs.	Norman Parke	Draw (majority) (29–27, 28–28, 28–28)	3	5:00	(Note: Parke was docked 1 point for grabbing Santos' shorts in round 2.)
Light Heavyweight	Fábio Maldonado	def.	Gian Villante	Decision (unanimous) (29–27, 29–28, 29–28)	3	5:00
Lightweight	Michel Prazeres	def.	Mairbek Taisumov	Decision (unanimous) (30–25, 30–25, 30–25)	3	5:00	(Note: Taisumov was docked 2 points: one for an illegal head kick in round 1 and another for grabbing the cage in round 2.)
Featherweight	Rony Jason	def.	Steven Siler	TKO (punches)	1	1:17
Preliminary card (Fox Sports 1)
Catchweight (190 lb)	Thiago Santos	def.	Ronny Markes	TKO (body kick and punches)	1	0:53
Flyweight	Jussier Formiga	def.	Scott Jorgensen	Submission (rear-naked choke)	1	3:07
Welterweight	Kenny Robertson	def.	Thiago Perpétuo	Submission (rear-naked choke)	1	1:45
Light Heavyweight	Hans Stringer	def.	Francimar Barroso	Decision (split) (29–28, 28–29, 29–28)	3	5:00
Preliminary card (UFC Fight Pass)
Featherweight	Godofredo Pepey	def.	Noad Lahat	KO (flying knee)	1	2:39

== Bonus awards ==
The following fighters received $50,000 bonuses:

- Fight of the Night: Maurício Rua vs. Dan Henderson
- Performance of the Night: Dan Henderson and Godofredo Pepey

== See also ==
- List of UFC events
- 2014 in UFC
