= UFC 163 =

UFC mixed martial arts event in 2013

UFC 163: Aldo vs. Korean Zombie
- The poster for UFC 163: Aldo vs. Korean Zombie
- Promotion: Ultimate Fighting Championship
- Date: August 3, 2013
- Venue: HSBC Arena
- City: Rio de Janeiro, Brazil
- Attendance: 13,873
- Buyrate: 180,000

Event chronology
UFC on Fox: Johnson vs. Moraga	UFC 163: Aldo vs. Korean Zombie	UFC Fight Night: Shogun vs. Sonnen

UFC 163: Aldo vs. Korean Zombie was a mixed martial arts event held on August 3, 2013, at the HSBC Arena in Rio de Janeiro, Brazil.

== Background ==
The main event was expected to feature current UFC Featherweight Champion, José Aldo taking on future UFC Lightweight Champion, Anthony Pettis. However, in mid-June Pettis pulled out of the bout citing a knee injury and was replaced by Chan Sung Jung.

Josh Koscheck was expected to face Demian Maia at the event. However, Koscheck was forced out of the bout with an injury and as a result, Maia was pulled from the card as well.

Promotional newcomer Robert Drysdale was expected to face Ednaldo Oliveira at the event. However, Drysdale pulled out of the bout in mid-July citing a lingering staph infection. Oliveira faced UFC newcomer Francimar Barroso at the event.

Phil Harris was expected to face John Lineker at the event. However, Harris was forced out of the bout and Lineker faced promotional newcomer José Maria Tomé.

Clint Hester was expected to face Cezar Ferreira at the event. However, Hester was forced out of the bout with an injury and was replaced by Thiago Santos.

Brian Stann co-commentated the card with Mike Goldberg due to a prior commitment for Joe Rogan.

John Lineker missed the 126 pound weight limit for a flyweight non-title fight, weighing in at 129 pounds. As a result, he surrendered 20 percent of his purse to his opponent, José Maria Tomé, and the bout took place as a 129-pound catchweight fight.

== Results ==
Main card
Weight class				Method	Round	Time	Notes
Featherweight	José Aldo (c)	def.	Chan Sung Jung	TKO (punches)	4	2:00	(Note: For the UFC Featherweight Championship.)
Light Heavyweight	Phil Davis	def.	Lyoto Machida	Decision (unanimous) (29–28, 29–28, 29–28)	3	5:00
Middleweight	Cezar Ferreira	def.	Thiago Santos	Submission (guillotine choke)	1	0:47
Middleweight	Thales Leites	def.	Tom Watson	Decision (unanimous) (30–27, 30–27, 30–27)	3	5:00
Catchweight (129 lb)	John Lineker	def.	José Maria Tomé	TKO (punches)	2	1:03
Preliminary card (FX)
Light Heavyweight	Anthony Perosh	def.	Vinny Magalhães	KO (punches)	1	0:14
Women's Bantamweight	Amanda Nunes	def.	Sheila Gaff	TKO (elbows)	1	2:08	(Note: This bout aired on the broadcast following the Ferreira vs Santos bout.)
Welterweight	Sérgio Moraes	def.	Neil Magny	Submission (triangle choke)	1	3:13	(Note: This bout aired on the broadcast following the Leites vs Watson bout.)
Flyweight	Ian McCall	def.	Iliarde Santos	Decision (unanimous) (30–27, 30–27, 29–28)	3	5:00
Preliminary card (Facebook)
Featherweight	Rani Yahya	def.	Josh Clopton	Decision (unanimous) (29–28, 29–28, 29–28)	3	5:00
Light Heavyweight	Francimar Barroso	def.	Ednaldo Oliveira	Decision (unanimous) (30–27, 30–27, 29–28)	3	5:00
Welterweight	Viscardi Andrade	def.	Bristol Marunde	TKO (punches)	1	1:36

== Bonus awards ==
The following fighters received $50,000 bonuses.

- Fight of The Night: Ian McCall vs. Iliarde Santos
- Knockout of The Night: Anthony Perosh
- Submission of the Night: Sérgio Moraes

== See also ==
- List of UFC events
- 2013 in UFC
