= UFC Fight Night: Machida vs. Dollaway =

UFC mixed martial arts event in 2014

- The poster for UFC Fight Night: Machida vs. Dollaway
- Promotion: Ultimate Fighting Championship
- Date: December 20, 2014
- Venue: Ginásio José Corrêa
- City: Barueri, Brazil

Event chronology
UFC on Fox: dos Santos vs. Miocic	UFC Fight Night: Machida vs. Dollaway	UFC 182: Jones vs. Cormier

UFC Fight Night: Machida vs. Dollaway (also known as UFC Fight Night 58) was a mixed martial arts event held at the Ginásio José Corrêa in Barueri, Brazil on December 20, 2014.

== Background ==
The event was the second that the UFC has hosted in Barueri, following UFC Fight Night: Maia vs. Shields in October 2013.

The event was headlined by a middleweight bout between C. B. Dollaway and Lyoto Machida.

Rony Jason was expected to face Tom Niinimäki at the event. However, Jason pulled out of the bout on December 10 and was replaced by promotional newcomer Renato Moicano.

Dan Miller was expected to face Daniel Sarafian at the event. However, Miller pulled out of the bout on December 11 and was replaced by promotional newcomer Antônio dos Santos Jr.

During the main card broadcast, it was announced that former UFC Light Heavyweight champion Quinton Jackson had signed a new deal to return to the UFC.

== Results ==
Main Card (Fox Sports 1)
Weight class				Method	Round	Time	Notes
Middleweight	Lyoto Machida	def.	C. B. Dollaway	TKO (body kick and punches)	1	1:02
Bantamweight	Renan Barão	def.	Mitch Gagnon	Submission (arm-triangle choke)	3	3:53
Light Heavyweight	Patrick Cummins	def.	Antônio Carlos Júnior	Decision (unanimous) (30–27, 30–27, 30–27)	3	5:00
Lightweight	Rashid Magomedov	def.	Elias Silvério	TKO (punches)	3	4:57
Welterweight	Erick Silva	def.	Mike Rhodes	Technical Submission (arm-triangle choke)	1	1:15
Middleweight	Daniel Sarafian	def.	Antônio dos Santos Jr.	TKO (finger injury)	2	1:01
Preliminary Card (Fox Sports 1)
Light Heavyweight	Marcos Rogério de Lima	def.	Igor Pokrajac	TKO (punches)	1	1:59
Featherweight	Renato Moicano	def.	Tom Niinimäki	Submission (rear-naked choke)	2	3:30
Featherweight	Hacran Dias	def.	Darren Elkins	Decision (unanimous) (29–28, 29–28, 30–27)	3	5:00
Bantamweight	Leandro Issa	def.	Ulka Sasaki	Submission (rear-naked choke)	2	4:13
Preliminary Card (UFC Fight Pass)
Welterweight	Tim Means	def.	Márcio Alexandre Jr.	Decision (split) (29–28, 28–29, 29–28)	3	5:00
Middleweight	Vitor Miranda	def.	Jake Collier	KO (head kick and punches)	1	4:59

== Bonus awards ==
The following fighters were awarded $50,000 bonuses:

- Fight of the Night: None awarded
- Performance of the Night: Lyoto Machida, Renan Barão, Erick Silva and Vitor Miranda

== See also ==
- List of UFC events
- 2014 in UFC
