= Rony Jason =

Brazilian martial artist

- Born: March 21, 1984 (age 42); Quixadá, Ceará, Brazil
- Height: 5 ft 7 in (170 cm)
- Weight: 145 lb (66 kg; 10 st 5 lb)
- Division: Featherweight
- Reach: 73 in (185 cm)
- Fighting out of: Quixadá, Ceará, Brazil
- Team: Team Nogueira (2010–2014); Pitbull Brothers (2014–present); Fortaleza EC
- Teachers: Bruno Gouvea, João Paulo Marques, Bruno Machado
- Rank: Black belt in Brazilian Jiu-Jitsu; Black belt in Kickboxing; Orange belt in Judo
- Years active: 2006-present

Mixed martial arts record
- Total: 31
- Wins: 18
- By knockout: 8
- By submission: 9
- By decision: 1
- Losses: 12
- By knockout: 3
- By submission: 1
- By decision: 8
- No contests: 1

Other information
- Mixed martial arts record from Sherdog

Rony Jason (born March 21, 1984), is a Brazilian professional mixed martial artist who competed in the Featherweight division of the Ultimate Fighting Championship. A professional competitor since 2006, Bezerra was also the Featherweight winner of Globo's The Ultimate Fighter: Brazil. His nickname is based on Friday the 13th film character Jason Voorhees; he wears the Voorhees mask on his walk to the Octagon.

== Background ==
Born and raised in Brazil, Bezerra began training in Brazilian jiu-jitsu at the age of 16, and was talented, winning various titles. Bezerra has also trained in kickboxing and judo. Bezerra attended law school before dropping out to further pursue a career in professional mixed martial arts.

== Mixed martial arts career ==
=== Early career ===
Bezerra made his professional MMA debut in 2006, where he fought Alessandro Cabeca in his professional debut, winning via second-round TKO.

At only 2–0, Bezerra took a fight against another up-and-comer, and future UFC Interim Bantamweight Champion, Renan Barão. The fight was very closely contested and ended in a split decision loss for Bezerra. He won his next fight via submission before suffering his second loss to Joao Paulo Rodrigues de Souza. Bezerra bounced back from the loss with first round submission wins over future UFC fighter, Felipe Arantes and tough journeyman, Felipe Alves.

On December 5, 2009, at the Platinum Fight Brazil 2 fight card, Bezerra fought future Bellator contender, Genair da Silva. He lost the fight via doctor stoppage after the end of round two. After the loss, Bezerra went on a five fight winning streak, where he claimed multiple titles for several promotions, and was named BloodyElbow.com's 2012 #1 Bantamweight prospect, despite never fighting in the division.

=== The Ultimate Fighter ===
In March 2012, it was revealed that Bezerra was selected to be a participant on The Ultimate Fighter: Brazil. Bezerra defeated Dileno Lopes via technical knockout in the first round to move into the Ultimate Fighter house, and become an official cast member.

Bezerra was selected as the first overall pick by Wanderlei Silva, to be a part of Team Wanderlei. In the last quarterfinal fight, Bezerra was selected to fight his close friend and training partner Anistavio Medeiros. Bezerra won the fight via technical submission after applying an armbar to Meideiros, nearly breaking his arm which forced the referee to intervene and stop the fight.

In the semi-final round, Bezerra was matched-up against Hugo Viana from Team Vitor. After three rounds, Bezerra was declared the winner via unanimous decision. The win moved him into the finals set to take place at UFC 147.

=== Ultimate Fighting Championship ===
Bezerra officially made his UFC debut at UFC 147 on June 23, 2012, against Godofredo Pepey to determine the Featherweight winner of The Ultimate Fighter: Brazil. He won the fight via unanimous decision.

Bezerra fought Sam Sicilia on October 13, 2012, at UFC 153. After a hard back-and-forth slug fest, Bezerra dropped Sicilia with a big right and finished with hammerfists to earn the second-round TKO stoppage. He won Knockout of the Night honors with his performance.

Bezerra next faced The Ultimate Fighter: The Smashes fighter Mike Wilkinson on June 8, 2013, at UFC on Fuel TV 10. He won the fight via submission in the first round.

Bezerra was expected to face Jeremy Stephens on October 9, 2013, at UFC Fight Night 29. However, Bezerra pulled out of the bout citing an injury (lumbar hernia). The bout eventually took place on November 9, 2013, at UFC Fight Night 32. Bezerra lost the fight via knockout in the first round.

Bezerra faced Steven Siler on March 23, 2014, at UFC Fight Night 38. He won the fight via a controversial TKO stoppage in the first round. Siler was initially dropped by two punches from Bezerra. Siler, having his back on the mat, immediately threw an up-kick as soon as Bezerra proceeded to walk toward him. At the very same time the referee stepped in to stop the fight as a conscious Siler was attempting to defend himself.

Bezerra faced Robbie Peralta on May 31, 2014, at The Ultimate Fighter Brazil 3 Finale. He lost the back-and-forth fight via split decision.

Bezerra was expected to face Tom Niinimäki on December 20, 2014, at UFC Fight Night 58. However, Bezerra pulled out of the bout on December 10 and was replaced by promotional newcomer Renato Moicano.

Bezerra faced Damon Jackson on May 30, 2015, at UFC Fight Night 67. He won the fight via triangle choke submission in the first round. The victory also produced a Performance of the Night bonus. On June 18, 2015, it was announced that Bezerra tested positive for hydrochlorothiazide, which is a banned diuretic, therefore his submission victory was overturned and he received a nine-month suspension. The UFC rescinded Jason's $50,000 "Performance of the Night" award.

Bezerra faced Dennis Bermudez on August 6, 2016, at UFC Fight Night 92. He lost the fight by unanimous decision.

Bezerra faced Jeremy Kennedy on March 11, 2017, at UFC Fight Night 106. He lost the bout by unanimous decision.

On October 10, 2017, Bezerra was released from UFC roster.

=== LUX Fight League ===
After being released from the UFC, Bezerra signed with LUX Fight League. He made his promotional debut against Diego Lopes at LUX 004 on March 15, 2019, losing the fight via unanimous decision.

Bezerra made his sophomore appearance in the promotion against Edgar Díaz Guzman at LUX 005 on July 19, 2019. He won the fight via first-round knockout.

=== Post career ===
Next Bezerra faced Alexander Grozin at RCC Intro 6 on November 16, 2019. He lost the fight via unanimous decision.

Bezerra then faced Daniel Bažant for the vacant FNC Featherweight Championship at FNC 5 on March 26, 2022. He lost the bout via unanimous decision.

He then faced Filip Pejić at FNC 11 on May 28, 2023. He won the bout via first-round knockout.

Jason faced Tariel Abbasov on December 16, 2023 at FNC 14, winning the bout via arm-triangle choke in the third round after losing the first two.

== Controversies ==
On November 9, 2013, after losing to Jeremy Stephens at UFC Fight Night 32: Belfort vs. Henderson, Bezerra punched a hole in a wall at the backstage where he required a dozen stitches and was suspended 30 days from Brazilian MMA Athletic Commission (CABMMA).

In October 2017, two videos were released where Bezerra was seen yelling and striking his sister who was lying on the pavement with multiple bystanders attempting to restrain him.

== Championships and awards ==
=== Mixed martial arts ===
- Ultimate Fighting Championship
  - The Ultimate Fighter: Brazil Featherweight Tournament Winner
  - Knockout of the Night (One time) vs. Sam Sicilia
  - Performance of the Night (One time - forfeited) vs. Damon Jackson
- Max Fight
  - MF Featherweight Championship (One time)

== Mixed martial arts record ==
Professional record breakdown
31 matches	18 wins	12 losses
By knockout	8	3
By submission	9	1
By decision	1	8
No contests	1	

Res.	Record	Opponent	Method	Event	Date	Round	Time	Location	Notes
Loss	18–12 (1)	Paweł Polityło	TKO (punches)	FNC 23	May 24, 2025	3	1:53	Belgrade, Serbia	
Loss	18–11 (1)	Jordan Barton	Decision (unanimous)	FNC 19	September 7, 2024	5	5:00	Pula, Croatia	For the FNC Featherweight Championship.
Win	18–10 (1)	Tariel Abbasov	Submission (arm-triangle choke)	FNC 14	December 16, 2023	3	1:39	Sarajevo, Bosnia and Herzegovina	
Win	17–10 (1)	Savio Chaves	TKO (punches)	Piaui Pro Fighter 04	July 2, 2023	3	3:45	Teresina, Brazil	
Win	16–10 (1)	Filip Pejić	KO (punches)	FNC 11	May 28, 2023	1	3:34	Zagreb, Croatia	Catchweight (151 lb) bout.
Loss	15–10 (1)	Daniel Bažant	Decision (unanimous)	FNC 5	March 26, 2022	5	5:00	Zabok, Croatia	For the vacant FNC Featherweight Championship.
Loss	15–9 (1)	Alexander Grozin	Decision (unanimous)	RCC Intro 6	November 16, 2019	3	5:00	Yekaterinburg, Russia	
Win	15–8 (1)	Edgar Díaz Guzman	TKO (punches)	LUX 005	July 19, 2019	1	2:05	Mexico City, Mexico	
Loss	14–8 (1)	Diego Lopes	Decision (unanimous)	LUX 004	March 15, 2019	3	5:00	Mexico City, Mexico	
Loss	14–7 (1)	Jeremy Kennedy	Decision (unanimous)	UFC Fight Night: Belfort vs. Gastelum	March 11, 2017	3	5:00	Fortaleza, Brazil	
Loss	14–6 (1)	Dennis Bermudez	Decision (unanimous)	UFC Fight Night: Rodríguez vs. Caceres	August 6, 2016	3	5:00	Salt Lake City, Utah, United States	
NC	14–5 (1)	Damon Jackson	NC (overturned)	UFC Fight Night: Condit vs. Alves	May 30, 2015	1	3:31	Goiânia, Brazil	Originally a submission (triangle choke) win for Jason; overturned after he tested positive for hydrochlorothiazide. Performance of the Night forfeited.
Loss	14–5	Robbie Peralta	Decision (split)	The Ultimate Fighter Brazil 3 Finale: Miocic vs. Maldonado	May 31, 2014	3	5:00	São Paulo, Brazil	
Win	14–4	Steven Siler	TKO (punches)	UFC Fight Night: Shogun vs. Henderson 2	March 23, 2014	1	1:17	Natal, Brazil	
Loss	13–4	Jeremy Stephens	KO (head kick)	UFC Fight Night: Belfort vs. Henderson 2	November 9, 2013	1	0:40	Goiânia, Brazil	
Win	13–3	Mike Wilkinson	Technical Submission (triangle choke)	UFC on Fuel TV: Nogueira vs. Werdum	June 8, 2013	1	1:24	Fortaleza, Brazil	
Win	12–3	Sam Sicilia	TKO (punches)	UFC 153	October 13, 2012	2	4:16	Rio de Janeiro, Brazil	Knockout of the Night.
Win	11–3	Godofredo Pepey	Decision (unanimous)	UFC 147	June 23, 2012	3	5:00	Belo Horizonte, Brazil	Won The Ultimate Fighter: Brazil Featherweight tournament.
Win	10–3	Reginaldo Vieira	Submission (armbar)	Max Fight 10	November 10, 2011	1	1:25	São Paulo, Brazil	Won the Max Fight Featherweight Championship.
Win	9–3	Anderson de Deus	Submission (arm-triangle choke)	High Fight Rock 1	September 17, 2011	1	3:12	Goiânia, Brazil	
Win	8–3	Marlon Medeiros	Submission (triangle choke)	Max Fight 9	July 16, 2011	1	3:14	Campinas, Brazil	
Win	7–3	Diego Ribeiro	TKO (punches)	Face to Face 4	April 23, 2011	1	0:43	Recreio dos Bandeirantes, Brazil	
Win	6–3	Jurandir Sardinha	Submission (triangle choke)	Win Fight & Entertainment 8	December 15, 2010	1	1:15	Salvador, Brazil	
Loss	5–3	Genair da Silva	TKO (doctor stoppage)	Platinum Fight Brazil 2	December 5, 2009	2	5:00	Rio de Janeiro, Brazil	
Win	5–2	Felipe Alves	Submission (rear-naked choke)	Hawk Fight Championship	October 10, 2009	1	0:38	Rio Negrinho, Brazil	
Win	4–2	Felipe Arantes	Submission (triangle choke)	Samurai Fight Combat	September 12, 2009	1	4:53	Curitiba, Brazil	
Loss	3–2	João Paulo Rodrigues	Submission (stomp)	Platinum Fight Brazil 1	August 13, 2009	2	2:30	Natal, Brazil	
Win	3–1	Renan Falcon	Submission (armbar)	Leal Combat MMA	September 4, 2007	1	N/A	Mossoró, Brazil	
Loss	2–1	Renan Barão	Decision (split)	Cage Fight Nordeste	November 9, 2006	3	5:00	Natal, Brazil	
Win	2–0	Fernando Gardner	KO (stomp)	Hikari Fight	November 8, 2006	1	N/A	Natal, Brazil	
Win	1–0	Alessandro Cabeca	TKO (punches)	Nordeste Mega Fight Vale Tudo 2	May 4, 2006	2	4:15	Mossoró, Brazil	

=== Mixed martial arts exhibition record ===
Exhibition record breakdown		
3 matches	3 wins	0 losses
By knockout	1	0
By submission	1	0
By decision	1	0

Res.	Record	Opponent	Method	Event	Date	Round	Time	Location	Notes
Win	3–0	Hugo Viana	Decision (unanimous)	The Ultimate Fighter: Brazil	June 17, 2012 (airdate)	3	5:00	São Paulo, Brazil	The Ultimate Fighter: Brazil Semifinal round.
Win	2–0	Anistavio Medeiros	Submission (armbar)	The Ultimate Fighter: Brazil	May 6, 2012 (airdate)	1	N/A	São Paulo, Brazil	The Ultimate Fighter: Brazil Quarterfinal round.
Win	1–0	Dileno Lopes	TKO (punches)	The Ultimate Fighter: Brazil	March 25, 2012 (airdate)	1	0:00	São Paulo, Brazil	The Ultimate Fighter: Brazil Elimination round.

== See also ==
- List of current UFC fighters
- List of male mixed martial artists
- List of The Ultimate Fighter winners
