= Cezar Ferreira =

Brazilian mixed martial arts fighter

- Born: Cezar Jesus Ferreira; February 15, 1985 (age 41); Catanduva, São Paulo, Brazil
- Other names: Mutante
- Height: 6 ft 1 in (1.85 m)
- Weight: 216 lb (98 kg; 15.4 st)
- Division: Heavyweight; Light Heavyweight; Middleweight; Welterweight
- Reach: 78 in (198 cm)
- Fighting out of: Belo Horizonte, Minas Gerais, Brazil
- Team: Blackzilians (2013–2016); Extreme Couture; MMA Masters (2016–present)
- Teacher: Vitor Belfort
- Rank: Black belt in Brazilian jiu-jitsu Master in Capoeira
- Years active: 2007–present

Mixed martial arts record
- Total: 25
- Wins: 14
- By knockout: 4
- By submission: 4
- By decision: 6
- Losses: 11
- By knockout: 6
- By decision: 5

Other information
- Mixed martial arts record from Sherdog

Cezar Jesus Ferreira (born February 15, 1985), better known in his home country Brazil as Cezar Mutante, is a mixed martial artist currently competing in the light heavyweight division. A professional MMA competitor since 2007, he has competed for the Ultimate Fighting Championship and Professional Fighters League. He was also the inaugural winner of Globo's The Ultimate Fighter: Brazil

== Background ==
Ferreira was born in Catanduva, but grew up in Ibitinga, São Paulo. He began training capoeira at the age of six. Cezar grew up wrestling and practicing Brazilian jiu-jitsu throughout his childhood and adolescence. Viewing tapes of UFC Hall of Famer Royce Gracie fighting caused his interest in Brazilian jiu-jitsu and MMA to grow. However, after having a rough home life and having to leave at seventeen years old, Mutante found Vitor Belfort who took him in as his own son, helping to raise him and take care of him. Belfort began training Ferreira in MMA at his gym.

== Mixed martial arts career ==
=== Early career ===
On April 29, 2007, Ferreira made his professional debut in a one-night middleweight tournament for Xtreme Fighting Championships in Brazil. He fought Andre Severo, winning via TKO at 1:29 of round one. In the next round of the tournament, Ferreira suffered his first defeat, losing to Antônio Braga Neto via decision. Ferreira took a long leave of absences from fighting after his wife got pregnant.

Three years after his debut, Ferreira returned to active competition, fighting on the Bitetti Combat 6 card against Felipe Arinelli. Ferreira won the fight after choking Arinelli unconscious with a D'arce choke in the second round. Only a few months later Ferreira, again, fought for Bitetti Combat, fighting on their seventh event. He defeated Cassiano Ricardo Castanho de Freitas via TKO (doctor stoppage) in the second round.

Ferreira then traveled to Las Vegas, Nevada, United States to train with Vitor at Xtreme Couture. He was placed on the Ring of Fire 40 card in Broomfield, Colorado, on April 16, 2011. Ferreira defeated Chaun Sims via knockout only 17 seconds into round one. Ferreira took his second professional defeat at Superior Cage Combat 2 in Las Vegas, Nevada on August 20, 2011, losing to Elvis Mutapčić via one-punch knockout.

=== The Ultimate Fighter ===
In March 2012, it was revealed that Mutante was selected to be a participant on The Ultimate Fighter: Brazil. Mutante defeated Gustavo Sampaio by submission with a guillotine choke in the second round to move into the Ultimate Fighter house, and become an official cast member.

Mutante was selected as the first pick (second overall) by his mentor and real-life coach Vitor Belfort to be a part of Team Vitor. In the second Middleweight fight of the season, Mutante was selected to fight Leonardo Mafra. Mutante won via submission (guillotine choke) in the second round. He was then scheduled to face Thiago Perpetuo for a spot in the final against Daniel Sarafian. He defeated Perpetuo by knockout (head kick) and was expected to face Sérgio Moraes, who replaced for Sarafian due to an injury.

=== Ultimate Fighting Championship ===
Mutante was expected to make his UFC debut on June 23, 2012, at UFC 147 against Daniel Sarafian to determine the winner of The Ultimate Fighter: Brazil. However, Sarafian injured himself and was forced out of the bout and replaced by Sérgio Moraes. Ferreira won the fight via unanimous decision (29–28, 30–27, and 30–27).

Ferreira was expected to face C. B. Dollaway on May 18, 2013, at UFC on FX 8. However, Dollaway was forced out of the bout with an injury and was replaced by Chris Camozzi. Then on April 7, Ferreira pulled out of the fight as well, citing an injury and was replaced by Rafael Natal.

Ferreira was expected to face Clint Hester on August 3, 2013, at UFC 163. However, Hester was forced out of the bout and Ferreira instead faced promotional newcomer Thiago Santos. He won the fight via submission in the first round.

Ferreira faced Daniel Sarafian on November 9, 2013, at UFC Fight Night 32. He won the fight via split decision (28–29, 30–27, and 30–28).

The bout with C. B. Dollaway eventually took place on March 23, 2014, at UFC Fight Night 38. Ferreira lost via TKO in the first round.

Ferreira faced Andrew Craig on June 28, 2014, at UFC Fight Night 44. He won the fight via unanimous decision (29–28, 29–28, and 30–27).

Ferreira faced Sam Alvey on February 22, 2015, at UFC Fight Night 61. Alvey won the fight via knockout in the first round.

Ferreira faced Jorge Masvidal in a welterweight bout on July 12, 2015, at The Ultimate Fighter 21 Finale. He lost the fight via knockout in the first round.

Ferreira was expected to face Caio Magalhães on April 16, 2016, at UFC on Fox 19. However, Magalhães pulled out of the fight in the week leading up to the event citing an ankle injury and was replaced by Oluwale Bamgbose. Ferreira won the fight via unanimous decision (29–28, 29–28, 29–27).

Ferreira next faced Anthony Smith on July 8, 2016, at The Ultimate Fighter 23 Finale. He won the fight via unanimous decision (29–28, 29–28, 29–28).

Ferreira faced Jack Hermansson on November 19, 2016, at UFC Fight Night 100. He won the fight via submission in the second round and was awarded a Performance of the Night bonus.

Ferreira faced Elias Theodorou on February 19, 2017, at UFC Fight Night 105. He lost the fight via unanimous decision.

Ferreira faced Nate Marquardt on November 11, 2017, at UFC Fight Night 120. He won the fight via split decision (28–29, 29–28, and 29–28).

Ferreira faced Karl Roberson on May 12, 2018, at UFC 224. He won the fight via technical submission in the first round.

Ferreira was expected to face Tom Breese on November 17, 2018, at UFC Fight Night 140. However, it was reported on November 9, 2018, that Breese pulled out of the event due to injury, and he was replaced by Ian Heinisch. He lost the fight via unanimous decision.

The pairing with Breese was rescheduled and was expected to take place on March 16, 2019, at UFC Fight Night 147. However, on February 1, 2019, Ferreira withdrew from the fight on February 1, citing a knee injury.

Ferreira faced Marvin Vettori on July 13, 2019, at UFC Fight Night 155. He lost the fight via unanimous decision.

=== Professional Fighters League ===
In March 2020, Ferreira signed with Professional Fighters League.

Ferreira faced Nick Roehrick on April 29, 2021, at PFL 2 as the start of the 2021 PFL Light Heavyweight tournament. He won the fight via knockout 37 seconds into the first round.

Ferreira faced Chris Camozzi at PFL 5 on June 17, 2021. He lost the bout via unanimous decision.

Ferreira faced Marthin Hamlet in the Semifinals off the Light Heavyweight tournament on August 27, 2021, at PFL 9. Off his very first kick, Ferreira injured his hamstring, which sent him down to the canvas and the fight was called.

Ferreira, replacing Patrick Brady, faced Denis Goltsov on April 14, 2023 at PFL 3. He lost the bout in the first round, getting knocked out by ground and pound. In early May, it was announced that Ferreira had failed a commission drug test and was pulled from the season. Ferreira was later suspended 9 months and fined for testing positive for Clomiphene and androstanolone

== Championships and awards ==
=== Mixed martial arts ===
- Ultimate Fighting Championship
  - The Ultimate Fighter: Brazil Middleweight Tournament Winner

== Mixed martial arts record ==
Professional record breakdown
25 matches	14 wins	11 losses
By knockout	4	6
By submission	4	0
By decision	6	5

Res.	Record	Opponent	Method	Event	Date	Round	Time	Location	Notes
Loss	14–11	Denis Goltsov	KO (punches)	PFL 3 (2023)	April 14, 2023	1	2:07	Las Vegas, Nevada, United States	Heavyweight debut.
Loss	14–10	Marthin Hamlet	TKO (leg injury)	PFL 9 (2021)	August 27, 2021	1	0:13	Hollywood, Florida, United States	2021 PFL Light Heavyweight Tournament Semifinal.
Loss	14–9	Chris Camozzi	Decision (unanimous)	PFL 5 (2021)	June 17, 2021	3	5:00	Atlantic City, New Jersey, United States	
Win	14–8	Nick Roehrick	KO (punches)	PFL 2 (2021)	April 29, 2021	1	0:37	Atlantic City, New Jersey, United States	Return to Light Heavyweight.
Loss	13–8	Marvin Vettori	Decision (unanimous)	UFC Fight Night: de Randamie vs. Ladd	July 13, 2019	3	5:00	Sacramento, California, United States	
Loss	13–7	Ian Heinisch	Decision (unanimous)	UFC Fight Night: Magny vs. Ponzinibbio	November 17, 2018	3	5:00	Buenos Aires, Argentina	
Win	13–6	Karl Roberson	Technical Submission (arm-triangle choke)	UFC 224	May 12, 2018	1	4:45	Rio de Janeiro, Brazil	
Win	12–6	Nate Marquardt	Decision (split)	UFC Fight Night: Poirier vs. Pettis	November 11, 2017	3	5:00	Norfolk, Virginia, United States	
Loss	11–6	Elias Theodorou	Decision (unanimous)	UFC Fight Night: Lewis vs. Browne	February 19, 2017	3	5:00	Halifax, Nova Scotia, Canada	
Win	11–5	Jack Hermansson	Submission (arm-triangle choke)	UFC Fight Night: Bader vs. Nogueira 2	November 19, 2016	2	2:11	São Paulo, Brazil	Performance of the Night.
Win	10–5	Anthony Smith	Decision (unanimous)	The Ultimate Fighter: Team Joanna vs. Team Cláudia Finale	July 8, 2016	3	5:00	Las Vegas, Nevada, United States	
Win	9–5	Oluwale Bamgbose	Decision (unanimous)	UFC on Fox: Teixeira vs. Evans	April 16, 2016	3	5:00	Tampa, Florida, United States	Return to Middleweight.
Loss	8–5	Jorge Masvidal	KO (elbow and punches)	The Ultimate Fighter: American Top Team vs. Blackzilians Finale	July 12, 2015	1	4:22	Las Vegas, Nevada, United States	Welterweight debut.
Loss	8–4	Sam Alvey	KO (punches)	UFC Fight Night: Bigfoot vs. Mir	February 22, 2015	1	3:34	Porto Alegre, Brazil	
Win	8–3	Andrew Craig	Decision (unanimous)	UFC Fight Night: Swanson vs. Stephens	June 28, 2014	3	5:00	San Antonio, Texas, United States	
Loss	7–3	C. B. Dollaway	KO (punches)	UFC Fight Night: Shogun vs. Henderson 2	March 23, 2014	1	0:39	Natal, Brazil	
Win	7–2	Daniel Sarafian	Decision (split)	UFC Fight Night: Belfort vs. Henderson 2	November 9, 2013	3	5:00	Goiânia, Brazil	
Win	6–2	Thiago Santos	Submission (guillotine choke)	UFC 163	August 3, 2013	1	0:47	Rio de Janeiro, Brazil	
Win	5–2	Sérgio Moraes	Decision (unanimous)	UFC 147	June 23, 2012	3	5:00	Belo Horizonte, Brazil	Won The Ultimate Fighter: Brazil Middleweight Tournament.
Loss	4–2	Elvis Mutapčić	KO (punch)	Superior Cage Combat 2	August 20, 2011	1	0:25	Las Vegas, Nevada, United States	
Win	4–1	Chaun Sims	KO (punch)	Ring of Fire 40	April 16, 2011	1	0:17	Broomfield, Colorado, United States	
Win	3–1	Cassiano de Freitas	TKO (doctor stoppage)	Bitetti Combat 7	May 28, 2010	2	3:37	Rio de Janeiro, Brazil	
Win	2–1	Felipe Arinelli	Technical Submission (D'Arce choke)	Bitetti Combat 6	February 25, 2010	2	0:55	Brasília, Brazil	
Loss	1–1	Antônio Braga Neto	Decision (unanimous)	XFC Brazil 1	April 29, 2007	1	10:00	Rio de Janeiro, Brazil	
Win	1–0	André Severo	TKO (punches)	XFC Brazil 1	April 29, 2007	1	1:29	Rio de Janeiro, Brazil	Middleweight debut.

=== Mixed martial arts exhibition record ===
Exhibition record breakdown		
3 matches	3 wins	0 losses
By knockout	1	0
By submission	2	0

Res.	Record	Opponent	Method	Event	Date	Round	Time	Location	Notes
Win	3–0	Thiago Perpétuo	KO (head kick)	The Ultimate Fighter: Brazil		1	1:26	Brazil	Fought at 185.
Win	2–0	Leonardo Mafra	Submission (guillotine choke)	The Ultimate Fighter: Brazil		2	1:05	Brazil	Fought at 185.
Win	1–0	Gustavo Sampaio	Submission (guillotine choke)	The Ultimate Fighter: Brazil		1	1:36	Brazil	Fought at 185.

== See also ==
- List of male mixed martial artists
