= Daniel Sarafian =

Armenian-Brazilian mixed martial arts fighter

- Born: Daniel Sarafian Gantman; 21 August 1982 (age 44); São Paulo, Brazil
- Height: 5 ft 9 in (1.75 m)
- Weight: 205 lb (93 kg; 14.6 st)
- Division: Light Heavyweight; Middleweight; Welterweight
- Reach: 69.7 in (177 cm)
- Stance: Orthodox
- Fighting out of: São Paulo, Brazil
- Team: Power MMA And Fitness
- Rank: Black belt in Brazilian Jiu-Jitsu
- Years active: 2006–present

Mixed martial arts record
- Total: 17
- Wins: 11
- By knockout: 1
- By submission: 7
- By decision: 3
- Losses: 6
- By knockout: 2
- By submission: 1
- By decision: 3

Other information
- Mixed martial arts record from Sherdog

Daniel Sarafian Gantman (born 21 August 1982 in São Paulo) is an Armenian-Brazilian mixed martial artist who last competed in 2018. A professional since 2006, Sarafian has formerly competed for the UFC, Bellator, Absolute Championship Berkut, and was a competitor on Globo's The Ultimate Fighter: Brazil.

== Background ==
Sarafian started training in the martial arts at the age of five years under his grandfather who was a black belt in judo. Sarafian took solely judo classes until he was ten years old when he began training karate. At sixteen he began taking lessons in Brazilian jiu-jitsu. After entering high school and getting constantly picked on for being overweight, Sarafian began working out and training MMA. Only a couple classes into MMA, Sarafian "fell in love with fighting".

== Mixed martial arts career ==
=== Early career ===
Sarafian made his professional debut at Predator FC 2 against Jorge Luis Bezerra, winning the fight via submission in round three. In his next bout, he agreed to fight UFC and Strikeforce veteran Mike Whitehead. Sarafian lost the fight via unanimous decision. After his bout with Whitehead Sarafian was asked to take a fight for District Combat Promotions, a small promotion based in the United States. Sarafian took the fight and won via submission (armbar) in the third round.

Sarafian stayed in the United States and fought on the Texas' promotion, Xtreme Fight Championship. He fought Cedric Marks and won the fight via submission in the first round. Sarafian then signed a one-fight deal with Bellator Fighting Championships to compete on their first fight card of their inaugural season. Sarafian fought Gary Padilla, losing in the second round via referee stoppage. Sarafian racked up four straight wins before signing on to take part on The Ultimate Fighter.

=== The Ultimate Fighter ===
In March 2012, it was revealed that Sarafian was selected to be a participant on The Ultimate Fighter: Brazil. Sarafian defeated Richardson Moreira via decision to move into the Ultimate Fighter house, and become an official cast member.

Sarafian was selected as the third pick (sixth overall) by Vitor Belfort to be a part of Team Belfort. In the first Middleweight fight of the season, Sarafian was selected to fight Renee Forte. Sarafian dominated the fight and won via rear naked choke in the second round.

In the semi-finals Sarafian was selected to fight Sérgio Moraes. Sarafian won the fight in the first round via KO after hitting Moraes with a flying knee as he dropped for a take down. The win moved Sarafian into the finals of the middleweight tournament, set to take place at the UFC 147.

=== Ultimate Fighting Championship ===
Sarafian was scheduled to officially make his UFC debut at UFC 147 on 23 June 2012, to determine the middleweight winner of The Ultimate Fighter: Brazil. However, due to an injury, Sarafian was replaced by Sérgio Moraes and did not compete at the event.

In his debut, Sarafian faced C.B. Dollaway on 19 January 2013, at UFC on FX: Belfort vs. Bisping. He lost the back-and-forth fight via split decision. Despite the loss, it was awarded the Fight of the Night honors.

Sarafian faced promotional newcomer Eddie Mendez on 8 June 2013, at UFC on Fuel TV 10. He won the fight via arm triangle submission in the first round.

In what was originally set to be The Ultimate Fighter: Brazil middleweight final, Sarafian faced Cezar Ferreira on 9 November 2013 at UFC Fight Night 32. He lost the fight via split decision.

Sarafian faced Kiichi Kunimoto in a welterweight bout on 14 June 2014, at UFC 174. He lost the fight via rear-naked choke submission in the first round.

Sarafian was expected to return to middleweight and face Dan Miller on 20 December 2014, at UFC Fight Night 58. However, Miller pulled out of the bout on 11 December and was replaced by promotional newcomer Antônio dos Santos. Sarafian won the fight via second round TKO as dos Santos dislocated a finger and was unable to continue.

Sarafian was expected to face Ricardo Abreu on 6 June 2015, at UFC Fight Night 68. However on 4 May, Sarafian was forced to withdraw from the event due to injury and was replaced by Jake Collier.

Sarafian was expected to face Sam Alvey on 21 February 2016, at UFC Fight Night 83. However, Alvey pulled out of the bout in late December after sustaining a broken jaw and was replaced by Oluwale Bamgbose Sarafian lost the fight via knockout in the first round. After his loss to Bamgbose, Sarafian was subsequently released from the promotion

== Championships and accomplishments ==
=== Mixed martial arts ===
- Ultimate Fighting Championship
  - The Ultimate Fighter: Brazil Middleweight Tournament Finalist (replaced due to injury by Sérgio Moraes)
  - Fight of the Night (One time) vs. C.B. Dollaway

== Mixed martial arts record ==
Professional record breakdown
17 matches	11 wins	6 losses
By knockout	1	2
By submission	7	1
By decision	3	3

Res.	Record	Opponent	Method	Event	Date	Round	Time	Location	Notes
Win	11–6	Carlos Eduardo	Decision (unanimous)	ACB 82: Silva vs. Kolobegov	9 March 2018	3	5:00	São Paulo, Brazil	
Win	10–6	James Austen Heidlage	Decision (unanimous)	LFA: Sioux Falls Fight Night 1	29 April 2017	3	5:00	Sioux Falls, South Dakota, United States	Return to Light Heavyweight.
Loss	9–6	Oluwale Bamgbose	KO (head kick and punches)	UFC Fight Night: Cowboy vs. Cowboy	21 February 2016	1	1:00	Pittsburgh, Pennsylvania, United States	
Win	9–5	Antônio dos Santos	TKO (finger injury)	UFC Fight Night: Machida vs. Dollaway	20 December 2014	2	1:01	Barueri, Brazil	Return to Middleweight.
Loss	8–5	Kiichi Kunimoto	Submission (rear-naked choke)	UFC 174	14 June 2014	1	2:52	Vancouver, British Columbia, Canada	Welterweight debut.
Loss	8–4	Cezar Ferreira	Decision (split)	UFC Fight Night: Belfort vs. Henderson	9 November 2013	3	5:00	Goiânia, Brazil	
Win	8–3	Eddie Mendez	Submission (arm-triangle choke)	UFC on Fuel TV: Nogueira vs. Werdum	8 June 2013	1	2:20	Fortaleza, Brazil	
Loss	7–3	C.B. Dollaway	Decision (split)	UFC on FX: Belfort vs. Bisping	19 January 2013	3	5:00	São Paulo, Brazil	Fight of the Night.
Win	7–2	Ricardo Silva	Submission (rear-naked choke)	Pretorian 1	5 July 2011	1	4:01	São Paulo, Brazil	
Win	6–2	Gilklei Antonio Silva	Submission (punches)	Blaze FC 1	26 February 2011	1	1:44	Curitiba, Brazil	
Win	5–2	Mauricio Alonso	Decision (unanimous)	First Class Fight 5	23 October 2010	3	5:00	São Paulo, Brazil	
Win	4–2	Yuri Villas Boas	Submission (arm-triangle choke)	Hero Kombat 1	24 April 2010	1	2:14	São Paulo, Brazil	
Loss	3–2	Gary Padilla	TKO (punches)	Bellator 1	3 April 2009	2	3:04	Hollywood, Florida, United States	Middleweight debut.
Win	3–1	Cedric Marks	Submission (triangle choke)	Xtreme Fight Championship	27 February 2009	1	2:06	Austin, Texas, United States	
Win	2–1	Lamont Lister	Submission (armbar)	District Combat Promotions 1	13 December 2008	3	1:32	Washington, D.C., United States	
Loss	1–1	Mike Whitehead	Decision (unanimous)	Platinum Fighting Productions 1	9 December 2007	3	5:00	Quezon City, Philippines	
Win	1–0	Jorge Luis Bezerra	Submission (guillotine choke)	Predador FC 2	11 August 2006	3	0:43	São Paulo, Brazil	

=== Mixed martial arts exhibition record ===
Exhibition record breakdown		
3 matches	3 wins	0 losses
By knockout	1	0
By submission	1	0
By decision	1	0

Res.	Record	Opponent	Method	Event	Date	Round	Time	Location	Notes
Win	3-0	Sérgio Moraes	KO (flying knee)	The Ultimate Fighter: Brazil	17 June 2012 (airdate)	1	4:07	São Paulo, Brazil	The Ultimate Fighter: Brazil semifinal round.
Win	2-0	Renee Forte	Submission (rear-naked choke)	The Ultimate Fighter: Brazil	8 May 2012 (airdate)	2	0:00	São Paulo, Brazil	The Ultimate Fighter: Brazil preliminary round.
Win	1-0	Richardson Moreira	Decision (unanimous)	The Ultimate Fighter: Brazil	25 March 2012 (airdate)	2	5:00	São Paulo, Brazil	The Ultimate Fighter: Brazil elimination round.

== See also ==
- List of current UFC fighters
- List of male mixed martial artists
