= Sérgio Moraes =

Brazilian mixed martial artist (born 1982)

- Born: Sérgio Moraes; July 23, 1982 (age 44); São Paulo, Brazil
- Other names: Serginho, The Panther
- Height: 6 ft (183 cm)
- Weight: 170 lb (77 kg; 12 st 2 lb)
- Division: Middleweight; Welterweight
- Reach: 73 in (185 cm)
- Fighting out of: São Paulo, São Paulo, Brazil
- Team: Evolução Thai; Alliance Jiu Jitsu
- Rank: 3rd degree black belt in Brazilian Jiu-Jitsu under Everdan Olegário
- Years active: 2006–2020

Mixed martial arts record
- Total: 22
- Wins: 14
- By knockout: 1
- By submission: 8
- By decision: 5
- Losses: 7
- By knockout: 4
- By decision: 3
- Draws: 1

Other information
- Mixed martial arts record from Sherdog

Sérgio Moraes
Medal record

Representing Brazil

Brazilian Jiu-Jitsu

World Championship
Gold medal – first place	2008 California, USA	-82kg
Silver medal – second place	2009 California, USA	-82kg
Bronze medal – third place	2010 California, USA	-82kg
Gold medal – first place	2011 California, USA	-88kg

Brazilian Jiu-Jitsu

European Championship
Silver medal – second place	2011 Lisbon, Portugal	-88kg
Gold medal – first place	2011 Lisbon, Portugal	Absolute

Brazilian National Championship
Gold medal – first place	2011 Rio de Janeiro, Brazil	-88kg
Silver medal – second place	2011 Rio de Janeiro, Brazil	Absolute

Sérgio Moraes (born July 23, 1982) is a Brazilian former mixed martial artist who competed in the welterweight and middleweight divisions of the Ultimate Fighting Championship, as well as being a competitor on The Ultimate Fighter: Brazil.

== Background ==
Born in the low-income neighborhood Cohab, in the city of Sao Paulo, Brazil, Moraes is known as O Orgulho da Cohab (“The Pride of Cohab”).

Moraes is a 4-time Brazilian Jiu Jitsu World Champion. His most famous fight was defeating Kron Gracie at the 2008 World Championship. Moraes's affiliation is the Alliance Jiu Jitsu Team.

Moraes is head Jiu Jitsu instructor at Evolução Thai in Curitiba, and he teaches at Reza Martial Arts Center Bahrain.

== Mixed martial arts career ==
=== Early career ===
Moraes made his professional MMA debut in October 2006 in his native Brazil. Over the next five years, he amassed a record of six wins and one loss, with five of his six wins coming via submission.

Moraes made his United States debut in June 2009 for Bellator Fighting Championships. After being rocked early in the round, Moraes was able to get a takedown and quickly lash up a Triangle choke to defeat Josh Martin via submission in the first round at Bellator 12.

=== The Ultimate Fighter ===
In March 2012, Moraes appeared as a fighter on The Ultimate Fighter: Brazil. In the opening elimination fight, he defeated former Muay Thai World Champion Thiago Rela by submission due to a heel hook from the 50/50 guard, midway through round 1 to get into the TUF house.

In the first round of the competition, Moraes fought Delson Heleno. Moraes defeated Heleno via submission (rear naked choke) early in the first round to move onto the semi-final round. There, Moraes fought Daniel Sarafian for a spot at the finals. Moraes was knocked out by Sarafian in the first round by a flying knee.

=== Ultimate Fighting Championship ===
Moraes made his UFC debut on June 23, 2012, at UFC 147 against Cezar Ferreira to determine the winner of The Ultimate Fighter: Brazil. He stepped in as a replacement for Sarafian, who was injured. Moraes lost the fight by unanimous decision after being knocked down twice by Ferreira.

Moraes fought fellow TUF Brazil alumnus Renée Forte on October 13, 2012, at UFC 153. After being outstruck for much of the bout, Moraes rallied back in the third round and defeated a visibly exhausted Forte by submission due to a rear naked choke.

Moraes faced Neil Magny on August 3, 2013, at UFC 163. Moraes won the fight via triangle choke in the first round. The win also earned him his first Submission of the Night bonus award.

Moraes was expected to face Zak Cummings on November 30, 2013, at The Ultimate Fighter 18 Finale. However, Cummings and Moraes had to pull out of the event due to injury and were replaced by Sean Spencer and Drew Dober respectively.

Moraes was expected to face Peter Sobotta on April 11, 2015, at UFC Fight Night 64. However, Sobotta was forced out of the bout citing injury and was replaced by Gasan Umalatov. In turn, Umalatov also pulled out with injury and was replaced by promotional newcomer Mickaël Lebout. Moraes won the fight via unanimous decision.

The fight with Sobotta was rescheduled for June 20, 2015, at UFC Fight Night 69. On June 9, the fight was scrapped once again as Moraes pulled out for undisclosed reasons. He was replaced by promotional newcomer Steve Kennedy.

Moraes faced Omari Akhmedov on December 10, 2015, at UFC Fight Night 80. He won the fight via KO in the third round.

Moraes was expected to face Kamaru Usman on May 14, 2016, at UFC 198. However, Usman was replaced on the card for undisclosed reasons by promotional newcomer Luan Chagas. The fight was scored a split draw.

Moraes was expected to face Michael Graves on November 19, 2016, at UFC Fight Night 100. However, Graves was removed from the fight on October 3 after he was arrested on a misdemeanor battery charge. Moraes instead faced Zak Ottow on the card. Moraes was awarded a split decision victory.

Moraes was expected to face Max Griffin but Griffin pulled out of the fight and Moraes faced promotional newcomer Davi Ramos on March 11, 2017, at UFC Fight Night 106. He won the fight via unanimous decision. After the fight with Ramos, Moraes signed a new, six-fight deal with UFC.

A rescheduled bout with Kamaru Usman eventually took place on September 16, 2017, at UFC Fight Night 116. Moraes lost the fight via knockout in the first round.

Moraes was scheduled to face promotional newcomer Abubakar Nurmagomedov on February 3, 2018, at UFC Fight Night 125. Within the same day, for undisclosed reasons, Nurmagomedov was replaced by Tim Means. Moraes won the fight via split decision.

Moraes faced Ben Saunders on September 22, 2018, at UFC Fight Night 137. He won the fight via a submission in round two.

Moraes faced Anthony Rocco Martin on March 9, 2019, at UFC Fight Night 146. He lost the fight by unanimous decision.

Moraes faced Warlley Alves on May 11, 2019, at UFC 237. He lost the fight via knockout in the third round.

Moraes faced James Krause on November 16, 2019, at UFC Fight Night 164. He lost the fight via knockout in round three and was subsequently released from the UFC.

=== Post-UFC career ===
On September 8, 2020, news surfaced that Moraes had signed with Taura MMA and made his promotional debut against Jared Revel at Taura MMA 10 on October 23, 2020. He lost the fight via unanimous decision.

== Championships and accomplishments ==
=== Mixed martial arts ===
- Ultimate Fighting Championship
  - Submission of the Night (One time) vs. Neil Magny
  - UFC.com Awards
    - 2013: Ranked #8 Submission of the Year vs. Neil Magny
- Fight Matrix
  - 2015 Comeback Fighter of the Year

== Mixed martial arts record ==
Professional record breakdown
22 matches	14 wins	7 losses
By knockout	1	4
By submission	8	0
By decision	5	3
Draws	1	

Res.	Record	Opponent	Method	Event	Date	Round	Time	Location	Notes
Loss	14–7–1	Jared Revel	Decision (unanimous)	Taura MMA 10	October 23, 2020	3	5:00	Rio de Janeiro, Brazil	
Loss	14–6–1	James Krause	KO (punches)	UFC Fight Night: Błachowicz vs. Jacaré	November 16, 2019	3	4:19	São Paulo, Brazil	
Loss	14–5–1	Warlley Alves	KO (punch)	UFC 237	May 11, 2019	3	4:13	Rio de Janeiro, Brazil	
Loss	14–4–1	Anthony Rocco Martin	Decision (unanimous)	UFC Fight Night: Lewis vs. dos Santos	March 9, 2019	3	5:00	Wichita, Kansas, United States	
Win	14–3–1	Ben Saunders	Submission (arm-triangle choke)	UFC Fight Night: Santos vs. Anders	September 22, 2018	2	4:42	São Paulo, Brazil	
Win	13–3–1	Tim Means	Decision (split)	UFC Fight Night: Machida vs. Anders	February 3, 2018	3	5:00	Belém, Brazil	
Loss	12–3–1	Kamaru Usman	KO (punch)	UFC Fight Night: Rockhold vs. Branch	September 16, 2017	1	2:48	Pittsburgh, Pennsylvania, United States	
Win	12–2–1	Davi Ramos	Decision (unanimous)	UFC Fight Night: Belfort vs. Gastelum	March 11, 2017	3	5:00	Fortaleza, Brazil	
Win	11–2–1	Zak Ottow	Decision (split)	UFC Fight Night: Bader vs. Nogueira 2	November 19, 2016	3	5:00	São Paulo, Brazil	
Draw	10–2–1	Luan Chagas	Draw (split)	UFC 198	May 14, 2016	3	5:00	Curitiba, Brazil	
Win	10–2	Omari Akhmedov	TKO (punches)	UFC Fight Night: Namajunas vs. VanZant	December 10, 2015	3	2:18	Las Vegas, Nevada, United States	
Win	9–2	Mickaël Lebout	Decision (unanimous)	UFC Fight Night: Gonzaga vs. Cro Cop 2	April 11, 2015	3	5:00	Kraków, Poland	
Win	8–2	Neil Magny	Submission (triangle choke)	UFC 163	August 3, 2013	1	3:13	Rio de Janeiro, Brazil	Submission of the Night.
Win	7–2	Renée Forte	Submission (rear-naked choke)	UFC 153	October 13, 2012	3	3:10	Rio de Janeiro, Brazil	Return to Welterweight.
Loss	6–2	Cezar Ferreira	Decision (unanimous)	UFC 147	June 23, 2012	3	5:00	Belo Horizonte, Brazil	The Ultimate Fighter: Brazil Middleweight Tournament Final.
Win	6–1	Etoube Manuelo	Submission (americana)	Jungle Fight 18: São Paulo	March 20, 2010	1	1:43	São Paulo, Brazil	
Loss	5–1	Brett Cooper	KO (punch)	Jungle Fight 16	October 17, 2009	2	4:59	Rio de Janeiro, Brazil	
Win	5–0	Tommy Depret	Submission (rear-naked choke)	Jungle Fight 15	September 19, 2009	1	3:55	São Paulo, Brazil	
Win	4–0	Josh Martin	Submission (triangle choke)	Bellator 12	June 19, 2009	1	4:21	Hollywood, Florida, United States	
Win	3–0	Gerson Silva	Decision (unanimous)	Mo Team League: Final	November 10, 2007	3	5:00	São Paulo, Brazil	
Win	2–0	André Santos	Submission (triangle choke)	Mo Team League 2	September 29, 2007	1	2:07	São Paulo, Brazil	
Win	1–0	Anderson Carioca	Submission (rear-naked choke)	Real Fight 3	October 21, 2006	1	N/A	São Paulo, Brazil	

Exhibition record breakdown		
3 matches	2 wins	1 loss
By knockout	0	1
By submission	2	0

Res.	Record	Opponent	Method	Event	Date	Round	Time	Location	Notes
Loss	2–1	Daniel Sarafian	KO (flying knee)	The Ultimate Fighter: Brazil	N/A	1	4:07	São Paulo, Brazil	Fought at 185
Win	2–0	Delson Heleno	Submission (rear-naked choke)	The Ultimate Fighter: Brazil	N/A	1	4:27	São Paulo, Brazil	Fought at 185
Win	1–0	Thiago Rela	Submission (heel hook)	The Ultimate Fighter: Brazil	N/A	1	2:15	São Paulo, Brazil	Fought at 185

== See also ==
- List of male mixed martial artists
