= UFC Fight Night: Belfort vs. Gastelum =

UFC mixed martial arts event in 2017

- The poster for UFC Fight Night: Belfort vs. Gastelum
- Promotion: Ultimate Fighting Championship
- Date: March 11, 2017
- Venue: Centro de Formação Olímpica do Nordeste
- City: Fortaleza, Brazil
- Attendance: 14,069

Event chronology
UFC 209: Woodley vs. Thompson 2	UFC Fight Night: Belfort vs. Gastelum	UFC Fight Night: Manuwa vs. Anderson

UFC Fight Night: Belfort vs. Gastelum (also known as UFC Fight Night 106) was a mixed martial arts event produced by the Ultimate Fighting Championship held on March 11, 2017, at the Centro de Formação Olímpica do Nordeste in Fortaleza, Brazil.

== Background ==
The event was the second that the promotion has hosted in Ceará, and first since UFC on Fuel TV: Nogueira vs. Werdum which was held at Ginásio Paulo Sarasate in June 2013. This event was expected to be UFC Fight Night 107, but an initially planned UFN 106 in Las Vegas, Nevada never materialized, prompting the change in numbers.

A middleweight bout between former UFC Light Heavyweight Champion and UFC 12 Heavyweight Tournament winner Vitor Belfort and The Ultimate Fighter: Team Jones vs. Team Sonnen middleweight winner Kelvin Gastelum was the event headliner.

Ion Cuțelaba was briefly linked to a bout against Henrique da Silva at the event. However the bout never materialized due to an undisclosed injury for Cuțelaba. da Silva was expected to remain on the card against another opponent, but elected to take another fight at a separate event.

Alex Nicholson was briefly linked to a bout with promotional newcomer Paulo Costa at the event. However, Nicholson was removed from the pairing in favor of Garreth McLellan.

Max Griffin was expected to face Sérgio Moraes at the event. However, Griffin pulled out of the fight on March 2 citing an undisclosed injury. He was replaced by promotional newcomer Davi Ramos.

Godofredo Pepey and Kyle Bochniak were expected to face each other at the event. However, both fighters pulled out of the fight during the week leading up to the event citing injuries and the bout was scrapped.

== Results ==
Main Card (Fox Sports 1)
Weight class				Method	Round	Time	Notes
Middleweight	Kelvin Gastelum	vs.	Vitor Belfort	No Contest (overturned)	1	3:52	(Note: Originally a TKO (punches) win for Gastelum; overturned after he tested positive for marijuana.)
Light Heavyweight	Maurício Rua	def.	Gian Villante	TKO (head kick and punches)	3	0:59
Lightweight	Edson Barboza	def.	Beneil Dariush	KO (flying knee)	2	3:35
Flyweight	Ray Borg	def.	Jussier Formiga	Decision (unanimous) (29–28, 29–28, 29–28)	3	5:00
Women's Bantamweight	Marion Reneau	vs.	Bethe Correia	Draw (majority) (29–27, 28–28, 28–28)	3	5:00
Welterweight	Alex Oliveira	def.	Tim Means	Submission (rear-naked choke)	2	2:38
Preliminary Card (Fox Sports 1)
Lightweight	Kevin Lee	def.	Francisco Trinaldo	Submission (rear-naked choke)	2	3:12
Welterweight	Sérgio Moraes	def.	Davi Ramos	Decision (unanimous) (30–27, 30–27, 30–27)	3	5:00
Bantamweight	Joe Soto	def.	Rani Yahya	Decision (unanimous) (29–28, 29–27, 29–27)	3	5:00
Lightweight	Michel Prazeres	def.	Josh Burkman	Submission (north-south choke)	1	1:42
Preliminary Card (UFC Fight Pass)
Featherweight	Jeremy Kennedy	def.	Rony Jason	Decision (unanimous) (29–28, 29–28, 29–27)	3	5:00
Middleweight	Paulo Costa	def.	Garreth McLellan	TKO (body kick and punches)	1	1:17

== Bonus awards ==
The following fighters were awarded $50,000 bonuses:

- Fight of the Night: Not awarded
- Performance of the Night: Kelvin Gastelum, Edson Barboza, Michel Prazeres and Paulo Costa

== Aftermath ==
Gastelum was expected to face former UFC Middleweight Champion Anderson Silva at UFC 212 on June 3. However, on April 6, he was pulled from the bout after he was flagged for a potential doping violation by USADA stemming from his bout against Belfort at this event. He tested positive for Carboxy-Tetrahydrocannabinol (Carboxy-THC) which is a metabolite of marijuana and/or hashish above the 180 ng/mL allowance by the World Anti-Doping Agency (WADA) standard. The in-competition sample was collected on the night of this event. Gastelum was placed on a provisional suspension as a result of the positive drug test and he was expected to be afforded a full adjudication process. On May 7, Gastelum's win was officially overturned and he was suspended 90 days (retroactive to the March 11 test date), and he's been fined 20 percent of his purse (which wasn't disclosed). The fine will be held by the commission.

== See also ==
- List of UFC events
- 2017 in UFC
