= Renée Forte =

Brazilian mixed martial arts fighter

- Born: Renée Forte Teixeira; March 27, 1987 (age 39); Fortaleza, Ceará, Brazil
- Height: 5 ft 7 in (1.70 m)
- Weight: 155 lb (70 kg; 11.1 st)
- Division: Lightweight; Welterweight; Middleweight
- Reach: 71.0 in (180 cm)
- Style: Brazilian Jiu-Jitsu, Karate, Muay Thai
- Fighting out of: Fortaleza, Ceará, Brazil
- Team: Team Nogueira; Bushido Académie
- Rank: Black belt in Brazilian Jiu-Jitsu; Purple belt in Karate
- Years active: 2006–present

Mixed martial arts record
- Total: 12
- Wins: 8
- By knockout: 2
- By submission: 2
- By decision: 4
- Losses: 4
- By knockout: 2
- By submission: 1
- By decision: 1

Other information
- Mixed martial arts record from Sherdog

Renée Forte Teixeira (born March 27, 1987) is a Brazilian mixed martial artist who formerly fought in the lightweight division of the Ultimate Fighting Championship. He was a competitor on The Ultimate Fighter: Brazil.

== MMA career ==
=== Early career ===
Forte compiled a 7-1 professional record before joining The Ultimate Fighter: Brazil cast.

=== The Ultimate Fighter ===
Forte was selected to compete on the inaugural season of The Ultimate Fighter: Brazil. Forte got into the house with a decision win over Fabio Luiz Vital da Costa.

In his opening round fight, Forte was submitted by Daniel Sarafian in the second round with a rear naked choke.

=== Ultimate Fighting Championship ===
Forte made his official UFC debut against castmate Sérgio Moraes on October 13, 2012, at UFC 153. He lost the fight via submission in the third round.

In his next fight, Forte made his lightweight debut against Terry Etim on February 16, 2013, at UFC on Fuel TV: Barão vs. McDonald. He won the fight via unanimous decision.

Forte faced John Makdessi on September 21, 2013, at UFC 165. He lost the fight by first-round KO.

In his fourth UFC fight, Forte faced promotional newcomer Francisco Treviño on March 15, 2014, at UFC 171. He lost the fight via unanimous decision, and was subsequently released from the promotion shortly after.

== Championships and accomplishments ==
- Ultimate Fighting Championship
  - UFC.com Awards
    - 2013: Ranked #10 Upset of the Year vs. Terry Etim

== Mixed martial arts record ==
Professional record breakdown
12 matches	8 wins	4 losses
By knockout	2	2
By submission	2	1
By decision	4	1

Res.	Record	Opponent	Method	Event	Date	Round	Time	Location	Notes
Loss	8–4	Francisco Treviño	Decision (unanimous)	UFC 171	March 15, 2014	3	5:00	Dallas, Texas, United States	157 lb catchweight bout; Forte missed weight
Loss	8–3	John Makdessi	KO (punches)	UFC 165	September 21, 2013	1	2:01	Toronto, Ontario, Canada	
Win	8–2	Terry Etim	Decision (unanimous)	UFC on Fuel TV: Barão vs. McDonald	February 16, 2013	3	5:00	London, England, United Kingdom	Lightweight debut.
Loss	7–2	Sérgio Moraes	Submission (rear-naked choke)	UFC 153	October 13, 2012	3	3:10	Rio de Janeiro, Brazil	
Win	7–1	Renan Santos	TKO (retirement)	Amazon Fight 8	May 27, 2011	3	1:52	Belém, Pará, Brazil	
Loss	6–1	Mario Sartori	KO (punch)	International Fighter Championship	April 29, 2011	2	3:10	Recife, Pernambuco, Brazil	
Win	6–0	Anderson Melo	TKO (punches)	Champions Night 14	June 5, 2010	1	1:38	Fortaleza, Ceará, Brazil	
Win	5–0	Julio Cesar Andrade	Decision (split)	Shooto Brazil 14	November 28, 2009	3	5:00	Flamengo, Rio de Janeiro, Brazil	
Win	4–0	Ramon Dias	Decision (unanimous)	Jungle Fight 13	March 28, 2009	3	5:00	Fortaleza, Ceará, Brazil	
Win	3–0	Jeferson dos Santos	Submission (rear-naked choke)	Kabra Fight Nordeste	March 13, 2008	1	N/A	Fortaleza, Ceará, Brazil	
Win	2–0	Andre Vasconcelos	Decision (unanimous)	Furia Fight 3	March 17, 2007	3	5:00	Fortaleza, Ceará, Brazil	
Win	1–0	Elinardo Silva Costa	Submission (armbar)	Rino's FC 1	February 9, 2006	N/A	N/A	Fortaleza, Ceará, Brazil	

== See also ==
- List of male mixed martial artists
