= The Ultimate Fighter: Brazil 1 =

UFC mixed martial arts television series and event in 201 2

- Season 1
- Starring: Dana White, Vitor Belfort, and Wanderlei Silva

Release
- Original network: Globo, Fuel TV
- Original release: March 25 – June 17, 2012

Season chronology
- Next → The Ultimate Fighter: Brazil 2

The Ultimate Fighter: Brazil is the first foreign version of the Ultimate Fighting Championship (UFC)-produced reality television series The Ultimate Fighter. It consisted of 12 episodes and a live finale in Brazil. This version did not have stand alone tournament finale. Instead, it appeared on pay-per-view in June 2012. It started filming in February 2012 and was in Portuguese. This version was produced by Floresta, a Brazilian production company, and aired in Brazil on Globo. Each episode was broadcast over the Internet at TUF.tv each Sunday night and later aired on Fuel TV in a marathon leading up to the finale.

On December 13, 2011, during the pre-UFC 142 press conference, Dana White announced that the coaches for the first season of this version would be Vitor Belfort and Wanderlei Silva. Belfort still faced and defeated Anthony Johnson at UFC 142. This was a departure from past seasons where following the coaches announcement the coaches did not compete against other fighters until facing each other after the conclusion of that season of The Ultimate Fighter.

The UFC held open tryouts on December 14, 2011. The casting call was for Lightweight and Middleweight fighters who are at least 21 years old and have a minimum of two wins in three professional fights. Of those who applied for the tryouts the UFC invited 350 fighters to participate. The fighters in the season were from the Featherweight and Middleweight weight classes.

== Cast ==
=== Coaches ===
Team Vitor

- Vitor Belfort, Head Coach
- Rodrigo Artilheiro
- Gilbert Burns
- Luiz Carlos Dórea
- Francisco Filho

Team Wanderlei

- Wanderlei Silva, Head Coach
- Andre Amade
- Rafael Cordeiro
- Renato Sobral
- Fabrício Werdum

=== Fighters ===
- Team Wanderlei
  - Featherweights
    - Rony Mariano Bezerra, John Teixeira, Marcos Vinícius, Wagner Campos
  - Middleweights
    - Delson Heleno, Francisco Trinaldo, Renee Forte, Leonardo Mafra
- Team Vitor
  - Featherweights
    - Hugo Viana, Rodrigo Damm, Godofredo Pepey, Anistávio Medeiros
  - Middleweights
    - Cezar Ferreira, Daniel Sarafian, Thiago Perpétuo, Sérgio Moraes
- Fighters eliminated before entry round
  - Featherweights: Rafael Bueno, Jhonny Goncalves, Fernando Duarte, Dileno Lopes, Pedro Nobre, Alexandre Ramos, Giovanni da Silva Santos, Jr., Fabrício Guerreiro
  - Middleweights: Charles Maicon, Gustavo Sampaio, Richardson Moreira, Thiago Rela, João Paulo de Souza, Gilberto Galvão, Fabio Luiz Vital da Costa, Samuel Trindade

=== Special Guests ===
- José Aldo
- Junior dos Santos
- Lyoto Machida
- Anderson Silva
- Demian Maia
- Antônio Rodrigo Nogueira
- Antônio Rogério Nogueira
- Maurício Rua

== Episodes ==
Episode 1

- The fighters are in the octagon at the HSBC Arena in Rio de Janeiro, when Vitor Belfort and Wanderlei Silva enter the arena. The coaches explain that there will be sixteen elimination round fights. The fights will consist of two five-minute rounds. If there is a tie after those two rounds, there will be a third round.
- Dana White comes out to give the fighters a pep talk. He explains that the winner in each weight class will earn an "international contract with the UFC."
- The elimination fights were then held:
  - Featherweight bout: Rony Mariano Bezerra defeated Dileno Lopes by TKO (punches) in the first round.
  - Middleweight bout: Francisco Trinaldo defeated Charles Maicon by TKO (punches) in the first round.
  - Featherweight bout: Godofredo Castro defeated Jhonny Goncalves by submission (triangle choke) in the first round.
  - Middleweight bout: Cezar Ferreira defeated Gustavo Sampaio by submission (guillotine choke) in the second round.
  - Featherweight bout: Hugo Viana defeated Alexandre Ramos by TKO (punches) in the first round.
  - Middleweight bout: Daniel Sarafian defeated Richardson Moreira by decision after two rounds.
  - Featherweight bout: Rodrigo Damm defeated Fabricio Silva by submission with a rear naked choke in the second round.
  - Featherweight bout: Wagner Campos defeated Fernando Duarte by decision after three rounds.
  - Middleweight bout: Sérgio Moraes defeated Thiago Rela by submission with a heel hook in the first round.
  - Featherweight bout: Anistavio Medeiros defeated Rafael Bueno by decision after three rounds.
  - Middleweight bout: Thiago Perpétuo defeated Joao Paulo de Souza by decision after two rounds.
  - Featherweight bout: John Teixeira defeated Giovanni da Silva Santos, Jr. by submission with an armbar in the first round.
  - Middleweight bout: Delson Heleno defeated Gilberto Galvao by decision after two rounds.
  - Middleweight bout: Renee Forte defeated Fabio Luiz Vital da Costa by decision after two rounds.
  - Featherweight bout: Marcos Vinícius defeated Pedro Nobre by technical knockout in the first round.
  - Middleweight bout: Leonardo Mafra defeated Samuel Trindade by decision after three rounds.
- The winning fighters are gathered in the octagon to receive congratulations from White, Belfort, and Silva.

Post Episode 1

- White announces that the ratings in Brazil for the first episode was approximately 12 million viewers.

Episode 2

- The fighters arrive to the TUF Brazil house. As they claim their beds, Medeiros decides to take a mattress and sleep outside.
- The fighters are taken to the TUF gym, tour the facilities and are met by White and the coaches. White explains that the fighter who earns the best fight of the season, submission of the season, or knockout of the season will earn R$45,000.
- White flips a coin with colors for each team (blue for Wanderlei, green for Vitor). Which ever coach's color comes up can choose to either pick the first fighter or set the first fight. The winning team of each fight takes control in setting the next fight. Silva wins the coin flip and decides to pick the first fighter. The fighters are then chosen by the coaches in the following order:

Coach	1st Pick	2nd Pick	3rd Pick	4th Pick	5th Pick	6th Pick	7th Pick	8th Pick
Wanderlei	Rony Mariano Bezerra	Delson Heleno	John Teixeira	Francisco Trinaldo	Marcos Vinícius	Renee Forte	Wagner Campos	Leonardo Mafra
Vitor	Cezar Ferreira	Hugo Viana	Daniel Sarafian	Rodrigo Damm	Thiago Perpétuo	Godofredo Castro	Sérgio Moraes	Anistavio Medeiros

- After the team selections, White announced he will be heading back to the United States and will not return until the end of the season.
- Medeiros is upset that he was the last person picked. Belfort tells him that he still wanted him on his team, regardless of in what order he was picked.
- Since Silva picked the first fighter, Belfort matched Castro against Campos as the first fight of the season.
- Campos, in an emotional interview, reflects on the sacrifices his family and friends have made for him. He hopes to be able to return the favor and make his daughters proud of him by succeeding in the competition.
- During a training session, Campos complains of a sore thigh muscle.
- The coaches announce that of the four finalists, the fighter who finishes his fights in the least amount of total time will win a Ford Ranger.
- José Aldo, UFC featherweight champion, comes to the TUF gym on the day of the fights to meet the fighters, offer advice and observe the match.
  - Featherweight bout: Godofredo Castro defeated Wagner Campos by unanimous decision after two rounds.

Episode 3

- Belfort matches Sarafian against Forte first middleweight fight of the season.
- Delson Heleno discusses with his teammates that members from both teams share a room. He suggests that the rooms should be split so that only people from a single team stay in it.
- Rodrigo Damm and Anistavio Medeiros have a verbal argument in the bus on the way back home in regards to making jokes about the other team. Damm believes it is disrespectful and that he should not do it; Medeiros feels it is just a joke.
- The special guest for the day of the fight is Junior "Cigano" dos Santos. He meets with all of the fighters prior to the fight.
  - Middleweight bout: Daniel Sarafian defeated Renee Forte by submission (rear naked choke) in the second round.
- Following the fight, dos Santos visits the fighters at TUF house to talk with them and offer them advice. One of the fighters asked about Cigano's efforts to reduce dengue fever in parts of Brazil.
- The campaign began in Bahia, where dos Santos has been working with the department of health to fight the disease.

Episode 4

- Anistavio Medeiros is up throughout the night wrestling with a statue of a panther and playing jokes, disturbing other fighters' sleep. He was temporarily locked outside the house, but made enough noise to be let back inside.
- Rony Mariano Bezerra decided that if he was not going to be able to sleep due to Medeiros' actions, he was going to train.
- While Bezerra is working out with a punching bag, Damm asks him to stop because it is disturbing others. Bezerra tells Damm that it was Team Vitor that started disturbing people during the night.
- Bezerra approaches the fighters and coaches of Team Vitor at the training center and explains the situation of the previous night. Belfort thanks Bezerra for his explanation and expresses a desire that the situation can be handled better in the future.
- On the way home from training, Damm complains that the coaches did not tell them what the next fight would be in advance.
- Belfort announces the next featherweight fight and matches Damm against Teixeira.
- Featherweight bout: Rodrigo Damm defeated John Teixeira by split decision after three rounds.

Episode 5

- Anistavio Medeiros makes a mock radio broadcast about Rodrigo Damm and his constant complaints.
- Belfort announced the next fight and matched his longtime student and first pick Ferreira against Mafra, the youngest in the house at 22.
- Middleweight bout: Cezar Ferreira defeated Leonardo Mafra by submission (guillotine choke) in the second round.

Episode 6

- Godofredo Castro's cocky behavior gets on the other fighters nerves.
- The next fight is announced by Belfort and he matches Viana against Vinícius.
- Featherweight bout: Hugo Viana defeats Marcos Vinícius by unanimous decision after two rounds.
- The Team Wanderlei coaches scold the team for not listening and likened them to rough diamonds not trusting the hands that want to polish them.
- Silva is upset that Rony Mariano Bezerra and Anistavio Medeiros, who have been friends for two years, are forced to fight each other.
- Lyoto Machida, former UFC light heavyweight champion, makes a guest appearance in the TUF house.

Episode 7

- Five consecutive losses starts to affect the blue team's morale.
- Team Wanderlei pulls a prank on the green team, drawing a mustache, beard, and boat hat on a large poster of Belfort.
- Bezerra and Medeiros have been friends and roommates together and the two had a problem having to fight each other.
- Featherweight bout: Rony Mariano Bezerra defeated Anistavio Medeiros by submission (armbar) in the first round.
- Afterwards, Silva gets incensed at Belfort's pick of the fight because it involved two friends fighting each other. Belfort argued that it was supposed to be that way and what kind of world it would be if God answered everyone's prayers. The argument escalates with the coaches entering the octagon.

Episode 8

- Silva announced the next fight and he matches Trinaldo against Perpétuo, a cancer survivor.
- Middleweight bout: Thiago Perpétuo defeated Francisco Trinaldo by TKO (forfeit) in the second round.
- The fighters show their respect for Trinaldo because of his kindly demeanor and his cooking.
- The last quarterfinal bout is automatically predicted: Sérgio Moraes will be matched up against Delson Heleno.
- Both are world-class Brazilian jiu-jitsu champions and the 34-year-old Heleno is the oldest fighter in the house.

Episode 9

- UFC middleweight champion Anderson Silva shows up as a guest trainer for Team Wanderlei, even partaking in the pranks as he draws a heart and a foot on the Belfort poster.
- Middleweight bout: Sérgio Moraes defeated Delson Heleno by submission (rear naked choke) in the first round.
- As Team Vitor had seven fighters in the semifinals and Team Wanderlei only had one, White deemed it to be unbalanced and demanded that Belfort send three of his winning fighters over to Team Wanderlei for three of the blue team's losers.

Episode 10

- Thiago Perpétuo, Sérgio Moraes, and Castro all get sent to Team Wanderlei for Vinícius, Renee Forte, and Delson Heleno.
- Rodrigo Damm was scheduled to fight Castro, however, he suffered from kidney problems as a result of the constant weight gain and loss.
- The doctors removed Damm from the competition, and he was replaced with Vinícius.
- Featherweight bout: Godofredo Castro defeated Marcos Vinícius by submission (armbar) in the second round.

Episode 11

- The Coaches' Challenge segment is presented by White and it is football penalty kicks. There will be ten kicks for each coach and who ever has the most goals wins 45,000 Reis and the winning team gets 2,000 each. Helping out are professional football players Paulo Henrique Ganso and Marcos Roberto Silveira Reis.
- Demian Maia makes a guest appearance and visits Team Vitor to see his pupil Sarafian.
- Middleweight bout: Daniel Sarafian defeated Sérgio Moraes by KO (flying knee) in the first round.
- Moraes was very upset about losing and cried for a long time.
- A joke about tying Anistavio Medeiros up goes wrong and he explodes, confronts Rodrigo Damm (who brought the tape), and throws a trashcan.

Episode 12

- Featherweight bout: Rony Mariano Bezerra defeats Hugo Viana by unanimous decision after three rounds.
- Antônio Rodrigo "Minotauro" Nogueira, Antônio Rogerio "Minotoro" Nogueira, and Mauricio "Shogun" Rua make a guest appearance.

Episode 13

- Middleweight bout: Cezar Ferreira defeated Thiago Perpétuo by KO (head kick) in the first round.
- Perpétuo was very emotional about losing and cried about it.
- Ferreira, who won his matches in six minutes and seven seconds, was declared the fastest fighter and won the Ford Ranger.
- There was 45,000 Reis given to fighters for best submission, best knockout, and best fight. Bezerra won best submission for his armbar on Anistavio Medeiros, Ferreira won best knockout for his head kick on Perpétuo, and the best fight went to Perpétuo and Francisco Trinaldo.
- The finals are then announced:

- Godofredo Castro vs. Rony Mariano Bezerra
- Daniel Sarafian vs. Cezar Ferreira

- Afterwards, there was a party in the TUF house, in which the fighters all tied up Medeiros to get him back for his pranks.

== Tournament Bracket ==
=== Featherweight Bracket ===
Elimination Round
Godofredo Castro	UD
Wagner Campos	2
Rodrigo Damm	SD
John Teixeira	3
Hugo Viana	UD
Marcos Vinícius	2
Anistavio Medeiros	1
Rony Jason	SUB

Semi-finals
Godofredo Castro	SUB
Marcos Vinícius*	2
Hugo Viana	3
Rony Jason	UD

Final
Godofredo Castro	3
Rony Jason	UD

=== Middleweight Bracket ===
Elimination Round
Daniel Sarafian	SUB
Renee Forte	2
Sérgio Moraes	SUB
Delson Heleno	1
Cezar Ferreira	SUB
Leonardo Mafra	2
Thiago Perpétuo	TKO
Francisco Trinaldo	2

Semi-finals
Daniel Sarafian	KO
Sérgio Moraes	1
Cezar Ferreira	KO
Thiago Perpétuo	1

Final
Sérgio Moraes *	3
Cezar Ferreira	UD

* Damm suffered from kidney problems and was replaced with Vinícius.

* Sarafian got injured after the show and was replaced on the finals by Moraes.

Legend
	Team Vitor
	Team Wanderlei
UD	Unanimous Decision
SD	Split Decision
SUB	Submission
(T) KO	(Technical) Knockout

== Finale ==
The finale was held at UFC 147 in June and featured the featherweight and middleweight tournament finals. The expected match between the coaches was canceled after Belfort sustained a hand injury while preparing for the fight. Wanderlei Silva rematched Rich Franklin as a replacement in the main event.

== See also ==
- The Ultimate Fighter
