= Lyoto Machida =

Brazilian mixed martial arts fighter and karateka (born 1978)

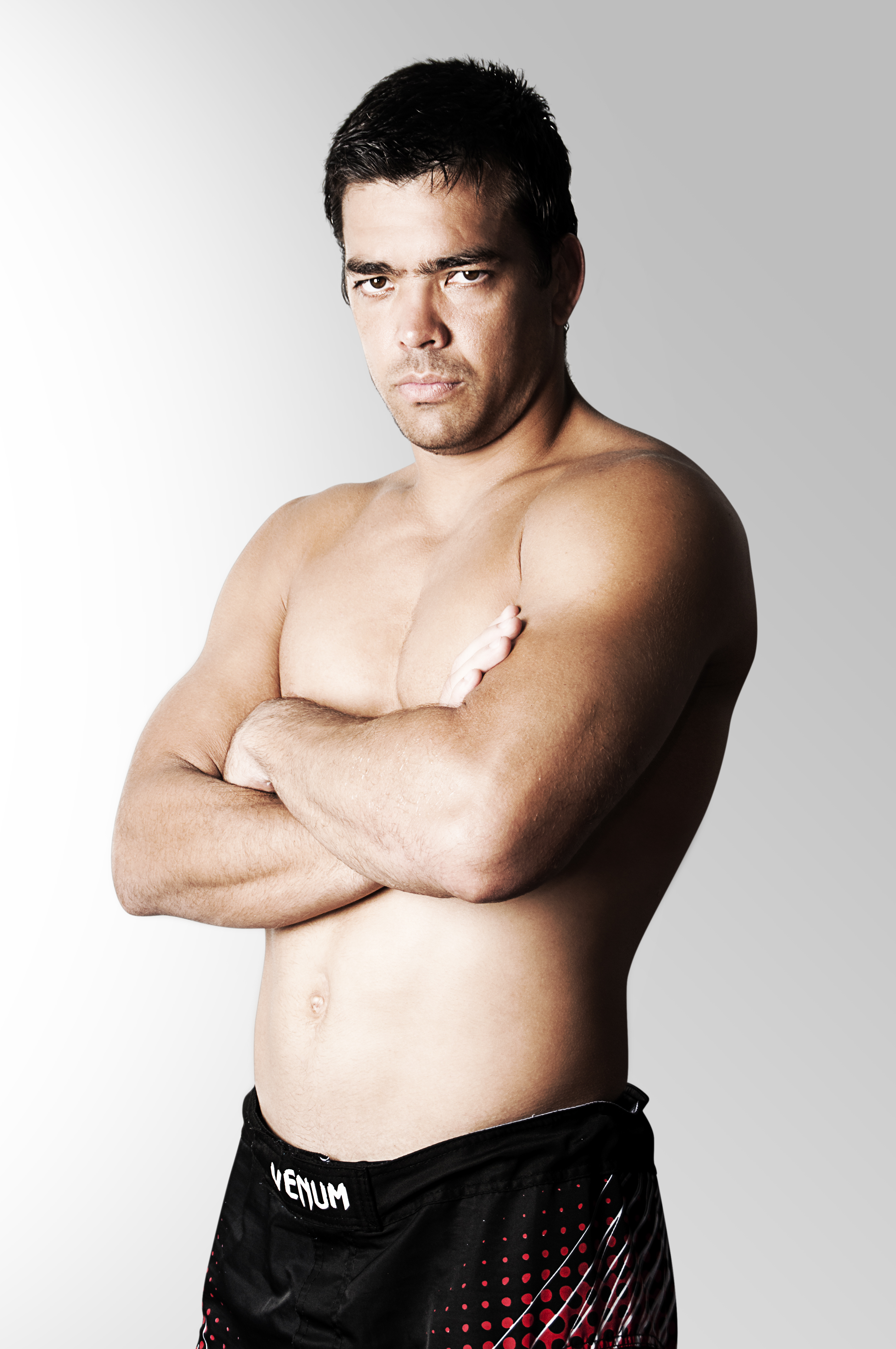
- Machida in 2011
- Born: Lyoto Carvalho Machida; 30 May 1978 (age 48); Salvador, Bahia, Brazil
- Other names: The Dragon
- Height: 6 ft 1 in (1.85 m)
- Weight: 185 lb (84 kg; 13 st 3 lb)
- Division: Heavyweight (2003–2006); Light heavyweight (2006–2013, 2019–2021); Middleweight (2013–2019, 2022–present)
- Reach: 74 in (190 cm)
- Stance: Southpaw
- Fighting out of: Los Angeles, California, United States
- Team: Black House; Gracie Jiu-Jitsu Academy; Kings MMA
- Teachers: Yoshizo Machida; Antonio Inoki; Wallid Ismail
- Rank: 3rd dan black belt in Shotokan karate under Yoshizo Machida; Black belt in Brazilian jiu-jitsu under Walter Broca
- Years active: 2003–present (MMA)

Mixed martial arts record
- Total: 38
- Wins: 26
- By knockout: 11
- By submission: 2
- By decision: 13
- Losses: 12
- By knockout: 4
- By submission: 2
- By decision: 6

Other information
- Mixed martial arts record from Sherdog
- Last updated on: 19 April 2018

Lyoto Carvalho Machida (Brazilian Portuguese: [liˈotu maˈʃidɐ]; Japanese: 町田龍太, romanized: Machida Ryōto; born 30 May 1978) is a Brazilian professional mixed martial artist. He formerly competed for the Ultimate Fighting Championship (UFC), where he was a former UFC Light Heavyweight Champion, as well as a UFC Middleweight Championship title challenger. He most recently competed in Bellator MMA in the Light Heavyweight and Middleweight divisions.

== Early life ==
Lyoto was born in Salvador, Bahia, as the third son of Shotokan karate master Yoshizo Machida (町田嘉三), the highly ranked head of the Brazilian branch of the Japan Karate Association. Yoshizo moved to Brazil from Ibaraki Prefecture in Japan when he was 22 years old, where he met and married Lyoto's Brazilian mother, Ana Cláudia. The Japanese spelling of Lyoto's name (龍太) is usually read as "Ryūta" (or "Lyūta" – Japanese language does not differentiate the letters "L" and "R"). However, his mother opposed it, as names ending in "a" are generally feminine in Portuguese. Because of that, they decided to name him Lyoto, with the masculine ending "o". Growing up in Belém, Pará, Lyoto began training in Karate at the age of 3 and earned his black belt at the age of 13. He also began training in Sumo at the age of 8, and then Brazilian Jiu-Jitsu and Judo at 16. He won a number of amateur karate tournaments, including the 2001 Pan American Karate tournament. Later he travelled to Thailand to study Muay Thai, to Japan to study Catch Wrestling at the New Japan Pro-Wrestling Dojo and finally to the United States to pursue his UFC career.

He was the runner-up in the 2000 Brazilian Sumo Championships in the 115 kg division. As an adult, he became Brazilian Champion twice, and placed second in the South American Championship. He defeated American fighter and jiu-jitsu black belt Rafael Lovato Jr. at L.A. Sub X. In addition to his sumo and karate achievements, he has a college degree in Physical Education.

Machida trained at the Inoki L.A. Dojo for six months in 2003 where he lived with future professional wrestlers Shinsuke Nakamura and Bryan Danielson.

== Mixed martial arts career ==
=== Early career ===
Machida began his career in mixed martial arts under the management of legendary professional wrestler and MMA pioneer Antonio Inoki in Japan. On 2 May 2003, he defeated Kengo Watanabe by decision in his professional debut on a card promoted by New Japan Pro-Wrestling in Tokyo. During this time he competed under the name of Lyoto, written in all caps. He was discussed by Inoki as a symbolic "successor" figure for himself, as Naoya Ogawa and Kazuyuki Fujita had been in the past.

In his second fight, he defeated future UFC Hall of Famer Stephan Bonnar by technical knockout due to a cut in the inaugural event promoted by Jungle Fight in Manaus, Brazil. This was Bonnar's first professional loss.

On 31 December 2003, he took part in Inoki's annual event Inoki Bom-Ba-Ye 2003, where he fought future UFC Middleweight Champion Rich Franklin in a catchweight bout in which both men weighed in at 214 lb (97 kg). In front of over 40,000 fans at Kobe Wing Stadium, Machida defeated Franklin via TKO in the second round. He staggered Franklin with a counter left punch and knocked him down with a front kick to the face, finishing up with punches which forced the referee to stop the fight. This was Franklin's first professional defeat.

Following this, Machida went on to compete for the K-1 promotion, where he beat kickboxers Michael McDonald (by submission) and Sam Greco (by split decision) under MMA rules. When K-1 began promoting Hero's, a series of fight cards featuring only MMA bouts rather than cards mixed with kickboxing matches, Machida was transferred there. He took on former UFC Welterweight Champion B.J. Penn on 26 March 2005, in Saitama at Hero's 1 in an openweight match. Machida weighed in at 225 lb (102 kg) while Penn weighed in at 191 lb (87 kg). Machida won by unanimous decision.

=== Ultimate Fighting Championship ===
Machida made his UFC debut on the preliminary card of UFC 67 against Sam Hoger and won by unanimous decision. He was expected to fight Forrest Griffin at UFC 70, but Griffin was out due to a staph infection and was replaced by undefeated David Heath, whom Machida beat by unanimous decision. He next faced judo practitioner and Pride Fighting Championship veteran Kazuhiro Nakamura at UFC 76. Machida won by unanimous decision and Nakamura would later test positive for marijuana.

At UFC 79, Machida faced Sokoudjou, a judo practitioner making his UFC debut after back-to-back upset knockout victories over Pride veterans Antônio Rogério Nogueira and Ricardo Arona. Machida submitted Sokoudjou with an arm triangle choke at 4:20 of the second round.

Machida's next fight was at UFC 84 against former UFC Light Heavyweight Champion Tito Ortiz, in what was thought to be Ortiz's final UFC appearance after a dispute with UFC President Dana White. Machida frustrated Ortiz with lateral movement and counterstriking while successfully defending against the former champion's takedowns. In the closing minutes of the third round Machida knocked Ortiz down with a knee to the body. As Machida moved in to finish the fight, Ortiz almost locked in a triangle choke before transitioning to an armbar attempt. Machida managed to escape and win by unanimous decision, with all judges scoring the fight 30–27 in his favor. Years after the bout, Dana White revealed that the only time he ever awarded a personal check of his to a fighter was to Machida, for defeating Ortiz.

In the co-main event of UFC 94, Machida faced fellow undefeated Brazilian contender Thiago Silva. The two were originally scheduled to meet at UFC 89, but a back injury forced Silva to withdraw from the contest. UFC President Dana White indicated in the pre-fight press conference that Machida would receive a title shot with a victory, while Silva would need to defeat Machida and win one more contest before earning the same opportunity. Machida was able to knock down Silva twice during the first round before ultimately knocking him out after tripping him and jumping in landing the knockout punch at 4:59 of the first round, scoring his first UFC knockout victory and winning his first Knockout of the Night bonus award.

==== Light Heavyweight Championship ====
Despite Machida's knockout of Thiago Silva, Dana White indicated that he was not the number one contender for a title shot. Instead, a scheduled fight between former UFC Light Heavyweight Champion Quinton Jackson and Keith Jardine would determine Machida's title fate. A victory for Jackson would earn him a fight with champion Rashad Evans, but a win for Jardine would mean Machida would be awarded with a title shot. Jackson won the fight via unanimous decision, but torn ligaments in his jaw forced the former champion out of the bout. Instead, Machida would challenge Evans for the UFC Light Heavyweight Championship at UFC 98. Jackson would retain his title shot against the winner of that match upon returning from injury.

Machida then met Light Heavyweight Champion Rashad Evans in another clash of undefeated fighters on the main event of UFC 98. Machida scored an early knockdown in the first round and ultimately knocked Evans out with a flurry of punches at 3:57 of the second round, becoming the tenth UFC Light Heavyweight Champion. His performance earned him Knockout of the Night honors with a $60,000 bonus for the second time.

Machida was expected to face Quinton Jackson in his first title defense, but Jackson opted to coach the tenth season of The Ultimate Fighter instead. Pride Fighting Championship's 2005 Middleweight Grand Prix winner Maurício Rua was then selected as Machida's first title challenger. The bout took place on 24 October 2009, at UFC 104, with Machida winning by unanimous decision, 48–47 from all three judges, with one stating that Machida "landed the more damaging strikes throughout the fight" and was the more "effective aggressor".

Out of the three judges, Nelson Hamilton gave Machida rounds 2, 3 and 4. Cecil Peoples and Marcos Rosales each gave Machida the first three rounds. In spite of this, a significant amount of the audience in attendance booed the decision after it was delivered, voicing their support for Rua. Writers for a number of sports websites and magazines also claimed they felt Rua had won. There were also MMA fighters in attendance who voiced support for the decision, among them were several of Machida's training partners, including Antônio Rodrigo Nogueira, Junior dos Santos, José Aldo, Rafael Cavalcante and Anderson Silva. A FightMetric analysis of the fight suggested that Rua had been more aggressive and had landed more blows to the head and legs than Machida, while CompuStrike reported that Rua landed almost twice as many strikes as Machida did. Both FightMetric and CompuStrike explicitly state on their websites that they are not intended to be used to judge MMA events, and are merely a way to track a fighter's activity.

Because of the controversy surrounding the close decision, on 8 May 2010, at UFC 113 in Montreal, Quebec, Canada, Machida and Rua rematched, seven months after their original fight. In the much anticipated rematch, both fighters started aggressively and scored significant points in striking exchanges, with Machida scoring two takedowns during the round. Rua showed strong defense on the ground, spinning to attempt a kneebar before both fighters returned to their feet. In a striking exchange, Rua swerved to avoid a left straight from Machida and landed a powerful counter overhand right to the temple, which knocked Machida down. Rua then took the full mount and proceeded to knock Machida out with ground-and-pound, making him the new Light Heavyweight Champion at 3:35 of round 1, with Machida suffering his first MMA career loss.

==== Back to title contention ====
In his first fight after losing the title, Machida faced Quinton "Rampage" Jackson on the main event of UFC 123. During the first round Machida landed several leg kicks and some counter punches while Rampage predominantly landed from the clinch, utilizing stomps and punches to Machida's side. Both Compustrike and Fightmetric records show that Rampage out-struck Machida when counting blows such as stomps and elbows to the thigh in the clinch, while Machida landed more strikes during the standup exchanges. In the second round, Compustrike and Fightmetric records show Rampage as the busier overall fighter, and Rampage also scored a takedown. The cleanest and most significant blow of the second round was an uppercut landed by Rampage. In the third round, Machida landed a counter left that stunned Rampage and followed it with a flurry of punches, kicks and knees that backed Jackson into the cage. When Rampage tried to retaliate, Machida scored a takedown, eventually gaining full mount and attempted a submission. At the end of the bout, Rampage was declared the winner via split decision.

In the post-fight interview, Rampage expressed that the fairest thing would be to offer Machida an immediate rematch, as he felt he had lost the fight. Five of 7 media outlets scored the bout in favor of Machida. However, since UFC President Dana White personally felt that Rampage won the fight, he denied the possibility of an immediate rematch. This generated some controversy, as White had previously awarded an immediate rematch to Rua in spite of a unanimous judgment decision awarded to Machida in that fight.

Machida was then set to face UFC Hall of Famer Randy Couture on 30 April 2011, at UFC 129. UFC President Dana White had indicated that Machida was under pressure to perform in his upcoming bout against Couture, saying, "this is a must-win for him." Machida defeated Couture via KO with a jumping front kick to the face at 1:02 of the second round, earning his third Knockout of the Night bonus award. Machida's kick received praise for being similar to the Crane kick featured in the 1984 movie The Karate Kid. Dana White commented that Machida's performance versus Couture put him back into the mix at the top of the division, but stated that he was not yet the next in line for a title shot. Joe Rogan ranked it as the 4th Deadliest Head Kick Knockout in 2015.

Machida was then briefly linked to a rematch with Rashad Evans at UFC 133, replacing an injured Phil Davis. However, Dana White claimed that Machida wanted "Anderson Silva money" for taking the fight on short notice and the UFC decided to schedule Tito Ortiz for the fight with Evans.

Machida was in talks to face Phil Davis, but the fight did not happen due to Davis needing more time to recover from knee surgery. Instead, Machida replaced an injured Rashad Evans and faced UFC Light Heavyweight Champion Jon Jones on 10 December 2011, in the main event of UFC 140. After a first round that saw Machida rock Jones with a punch, in the second round Jones took Machida down and cut him with an elbow strike. After standing up, Machida was knocked down with a straight left counter and then caught in a standing guillotine and choked unconscious at 4:26 of the second round, losing the title bout by technical submission. Both men won Fight of the Night honors.

Machida then faced The Ultimate Fighter Season 8 winner Ryan Bader on 4 August 2012, in the co-main event of UFC on Fox 4. In a dominant performance throughout the contest, Machida knocked out Bader with a counter right hand at the 1:32 mark of the second round. As a result, Machida was expected to get another title shot.

Following the abrupt cancellation of UFC 151, Machida's rematch with Jon Jones was expected to take place at UFC 152, but Machida declined the fight citing that he did not have ample time to prepare, and was replaced by Vitor Belfort. As a result of turning down the fight at UFC 152, it was later confirmed by the UFC that Machida no longer had an immediate title shot.

Machida faced the Final Strikeforce Light Heavyweight Champion, Pride Middleweight Champion, Pride Welterweight Champion and at that time #1 contender Dan Henderson on 23 February 2013, on the co-main event of UFC 157. The winner of the fight was expected to get a title shot. Machida defeated Henderson via split decision, but ultimately Alexander Gustafsson was given the title shot against Jon Jones.

Machida returned to his native Brazil to face Phil Davis on 3 August 2013, at UFC 163. Davis defeated Machida by unanimous decision. This caused controversy among many MMA fans. In one sample, 13 of 13 media outlets scored the bout in favor of Machida. ESPN scored it for Davis. Davis had takedowns near the end of rounds one and two, and landed a few punches on the ground, which formed his only significant offense in the fight. Many UFC affiliate bloggers also scored the fight 30–27 in favor of Machida. UFC President Dana White stated shortly after the fight that he had Machida winning all three rounds, and later told Yahoo! Sports that "Machida definitely won" and "MMA judging sucks". Fightmetric analysis shows that while Davis landed more total strikes, Machida landed the more significant strikes. ESPN released a similar analysis tracking each fighter's activity in each category, and reporting the 29–28 victory scored by the three judges at ringside. After the loss but before his move to middleweight, Machida remained higher than Davis in the official UFC rankings.

==== Move to Middleweight ====
Dana White announced on 21 August 2013, during Fox Sports Live that Machida would be dropping down to the middleweight division. He was expected to face Tim Kennedy on 6 November 2013, on the main event of UFC: Fight for the Troops 3. However, Machida was pulled from the bout and was set to face his friend and training partner Mark Muñoz on 26 October 2013, at UFC Fight Night 30, replacing Muñoz's original opponent Michael Bisping, who was forced out of the bout with an eye injury. Machida defeated Muñoz via head kick KO at the 3:10 mark of the first round, earning him his fourth Knockout of the Night award. Machida was praised for demonstrating class and sportsmanship by not throwing any additional punches to the grounded Muñoz after knocking him down before the referee stopped the fight. He became a free agent after the bout, and after entertaining offers from various promotions he re-signed with the UFC.

In his second bout in the middleweight division, Machida returned to Brazil and faced former Strikeforce Light Heavyweight Champion Gegard Mousasi in the main event of UFC Fight Night 36 on 15 February 2014. Machida won the fight via unanimous decision after five rounds, also earning his second Fight of the Night bonus award.

Machida was then expected to get a title shot against the winner of the UFC 173 fight between UFC Middleweight Champion Chris Weidman and Vitor Belfort. However, after Belfort withdrew from the bout on 28 February 2014, it was announced that Machida would replace him in the main event UFC 173 on 24 May 2014. On 24 March 2014, it was revealed that Weidman would need to undergo knee surgery. The title fight with Weidman was rescheduled and eventually took place at UFC 175 on 5 July 2014. Machida lost the fight via unanimous decision. After Weidman had controlled much of the action throughout the first three rounds with his wrestling and relentless pressure, Machida began to find his range on his strikes in the fourth. Machida landed a number of hard strikes in the round including a left hook which stunned Weidman at the very end of the round. Machida would continue to find success striking early in the fifth as well. However, Weidman would land several hard shots of his own later in the round before seemingly clinching the round with a takedown and controlling Machida from top position for over a minute, although Machida managed to stand up and attack with a flurry of strikes in the closing seconds of the fight. Despite losing on the scorecards, Machida earned his third Fight of the Night bonus award for his performance.

Machida next faced C. B. Dollaway on 20 December 2014 at UFC Fight Night 58. Machida won the fight via TKO only 62 seconds into the first round after landing a body kick that dropped Dollaway, finishing him with a barrage of punches that forced the referee to stop the fight. Machida also earned a Performance of the Night bonus award.

Machida faced Luke Rockhold on 18 April 2015, at UFC on Fox 15. He lost the fight via submission in the second round after being dominated on the ground by Rockhold throughout the whole of the fight.

Machida faced Yoel Romero on 27 June 2015, at UFC Fight Night 70. After a fairly competitive first two rounds, Machida lost the fight via knockout in the third round.

A rematch with Dan Henderson was expected to take place on 16 April 2016, at UFC on Fox 19. However, on 13 April, the UFC announced that Machida declared the usage of a banned substance – 7-Keto-DHEA – during an out-of-competition sample collection the week prior. Machida stated that he was unaware that the substance was prohibited both in and out of competition. Therefore, he was removed from the bout and Henderson was re-booked for another event at a later date. Machida was ultimately suspended for 18 months by USADA, becoming eligible to return on 8 October 2017.

On 13 August 2016, Machida faced former Strikeforce middleweight champion and UFC welterweight contender, Jake Shields, in a grappling only benefit event called Submit Cancer. After gaining top control, Shields submitted the much larger Machida by inside heel hook with just 30 seconds left in the match.

==== Post-suspension reign ====
In his first fight after returning from his suspension, Machida faced Derek Brunson on 28 October 2017 at UFC Fight Night 119. He lost the fight via knockout in the first round.

Machida faced Eryk Anders on 3 February 2018 at UFC Fight Night 125. He won the fight via split decision, snapping his 3-fight losing streak.

Machida faced Vitor Belfort on 12 May 2018 at UFC 224. He won the fight via knock-out in the second round. This win earned him the Performance of the Night award.

=== Bellator MMA ===
On 22 June 2018, it was reported that Machida signed a multi-fight contract with Bellator MMA. On 12 September, it was announced that Machida was set to make his promotional debut against former Bellator Middleweight Champion Rafael Carvalho in the co-headliner of Bellator 213. On weigh-in day, Carvalho missed weight, weighing in at 186.5 pounds, over the non-title Middleweight limit of 186.0 pounds. Carvalho was fined 20% of his purse and the fight proceeded as a Catchweight bout. Machida went on to defeat Carvalho by split decision.

On 4 April 2019, it was announced that Machida would be facing Chael Sonnen in a light heavyweight bout at Bellator 222 on 14 June 2019 at Madison Square Garden. He won the fight via TKO in the second round.

Machida rematched prior UFC opponent Gegard Mousasi at Bellator 228 on 28 September 2019. He lost the bout via split decision.

Machida headlined Bellator 245 in a rematch against Phil Davis on September 11, 2020. He lost the fight by split decision.

==== Bellator Light Heavyweight World Grand Prix ====
On February 9, 2021, it was announced that Machida would be participating in the Bellator Light Heavyweight World Grand Prix. He faced Ryan Bader in the quarterfinal round. This was a rematch of their August 2012 bout, which saw Machida win via second-round knockout. The bout took place at Bellator 256 on April 9, 2021. In the first round Machida had success with his kicks, outstriking Bader, but would soon be dominated for the next four rounds by Bader's wrestling and ground and pound, losing the fight via unanimous decision.

==== Return to Middleweight ====
Returning to Middleweight in the last fight of his prevailing contract, Machida faced Fabian Edwards on May 13, 2022, at Bellator 281. He lost the fight via knockout in the first round.

== Fighting style ==
Machida uses a unique, unorthodox style in MMA that combines elements from his diverse training background. His style is based mainly on tactics using Shotokan karate and Brazilian jiu-jitsu, but also integrates techniques from wrestling and sumo, which Machida says makes him "fully prepared for any situation" in the Octagon. Often described as "elusive," Machida relies on cautious and precise counter-striking that frustrates his opponents into making mistakes. Machida has earned considerable respect from MMA fans, fighters, and commentators for his effectiveness and winning ways. At the same time, his cerebral and conservative style is sometimes deemed boring and unsatisfying to watch. Machida has drawn fire from fans, and criticism from MMA commentators for his limited aggression and many decision victories. In response to these criticisms, Machida said, "If you don't like it, sorry. I always try to win." He also stated that he believes fans are coming to appreciate the efficiency of his style just like they came to appreciate Royce Gracie's jiu-jitsu.

Machida defied expectations at UFC 94, where he earned Knockout of the Night honors for his first-round stoppage of then-undefeated Thiago Silva. Machida noted that he started to include weight training in his preparation for the bout. Commentators hailed the knockout as a step in the right direction toward building interest in him as a potential champion. In addition, Machida showcased his improved English during interviews for the event, which gave him the ability to connect with fans more easily. Machida's limited English was previously seen as a marketing liability. After knocking out Rashad Evans at UFC 98, in the post fight interview with Joe Rogan, Machida announced to his fans, "Karate is back! Machida Karate!" Many fans have referred to his style as "Machida Karate" since then.

In an issue of MMA Unltd magazine, Machida once again mentioned the phrase "Machida Karate", claiming that it was based on a very traditional form which is very different from modern sports karate. He also said that the karate seen nowadays has lost many techniques over the years in which it was practiced, and that his style was one of the very few that still kept those techniques. "My style is Machida Karate and it is a very traditional form", he said, "It differs from sports karate which we usually see in karate schools and competitions as it has many elements which were lost in the style including the use of knees, elbows, takedowns and even some submissions". Machida is a black belt in Brazilian jiu-jitsu under Walter Broca.

During his fight with Ryan Bader, Joe Rogan mentioned that Machida's karate style meant his fighting distance and range is at least a foot farther than a typical boxer or Muay Thai fighter. Machida controls the range and avoids being hit or rushed effectively, but does so in a way that is different from Anderson Silva (who controls range through a variety of strikes and kicks) and Jon Jones (who controls range using his reach). Like Silva though, Machida changes stance from southpaw to orthodox frequently, with minimal drop-off in efficiency. While his kicks do not seem to land with as much power because he does not step into his kicks, they have quicker release with no tells, so they are difficult to anticipate and counter. Despite this purported lack of power, Machida's combination of accuracy, traditional kicking style, and frequent hip and eye feints have allowed him to finish several fights with his kicks, as he did against Randy Couture, Mark Muñoz, C. B. Dollaway, and Vitor Belfort.

== Personal life ==
Machida's wife is named Fabyola, and they have two sons. They reside in Palos Verdes Estates, California.

Lyoto's older brother Chinzô is also a Shotokan karate champion and MMA fighter, who previously competed in Bellator MMA. Lyoto and Chinzô fought in a karate tournament final over ten years ago in which Lyoto gave Chinzô a cheek scar that still exists today. His other brothers include Kenzo Machida, a TV journalist for one of Brazil's biggest TV stations, and Take Machida.

== Championships and accomplishments ==
- Ultimate Fighting Championship
  - UFC Light Heavyweight Championship (One time)
    - One successful title defense vs. Maurício Rua
  - Knockout of the Night (Four times) vs. Thiago Silva, Rashad Evans, Randy Couture and Mark Muñoz
  - Fight of the Night (Three times) vs. Jon Jones, Gegard Mousasi and Chris Weidman
  - Performance of the Night (Two times) vs. C.B. Dollaway and Vitor Belfort
  - Highest takedown accuracy percentage in UFC Light Heavyweight division history (65.0%)
  - Fourth longest win streak in UFC Light Heavyweight division history (8)
  - Fourth most knockdowns landed in UFC Light Heavyweight division history (11)
    - Tied (Chuck Liddell, Junior dos Santos, Thiago Santos, Maurício Rua & Khalil Rountree Jr.) for sixth most knockdowns landed in UFC history (14)
  - UFC.com Awards
    - 2009: Half-Year Awards: Best Knockout of the 1HY vs. Rashad Evans, Ranked #2 Knockout of the Year vs. Rashad Evans, Ranked #2 Fighter of the Year & Ranked #9 Fight of the Year vs. Maurício Rua
    - 2011: Ranked #6 Knockout of the Year vs. Randy Couture
    - 2013: Ranked #9 Knockout of the Year vs. Mark Munoz
    - 2018: Ranked #3 Knockout of the Year vs. Vitor Belfort
- Sherdog
  - 2011 Knockout of the Year vs. Randy Couture
  - Mixed Martial Arts Hall of Fame
- Black Belt Magazine
  - 2009 Fighter of the Year
- MMA Fighting
  - 2009 #5 Ranked Fighter of the Year
- MMA Torch
  - 2014 Fight of the Year vs. Chris Weidman at UFC 175
- Fight Matrix
  - 2014 Most Noteworthy Match of the Year vs. Chris Weidman on 5 July 2014
- MMA Junkie
  - 2014 July Fight of the Month vs. Chris Weidman
  - 2018 May Knockout of the Month vs. Vitor Belfort
- CBS Sports
  - 2018 #2 Ranked UFC Knockout of the Year vs. Vitor Belfort
- Bleacher Report
  - 2014 #3 Ranked Fight of the Year vs. Chris Weidman

== Mixed martial arts record ==
Professional record breakdown
38 matches	26 wins	12 losses
By knockout	11	4
By submission	2	2
By decision	13	6

Res.	Record	Opponent	Method	Event	Date	Round	Time	Location	Notes
Loss	26–12	Fabian Edwards	KO (elbow and punches)	Bellator 281	13 May 2022	1	3:18	London, England	Return to Middleweight.
Loss	26–11	Ryan Bader	Decision (unanimous)	Bellator 256	9 April 2021	5	5:00	Uncasville, Connecticut, United States	Bellator Light Heavyweight World Grand Prix Quarterfinal.
Loss	26–10	Phil Davis	Decision (split)	Bellator 245	11 September 2020	3	5:00	Uncasville, Connecticut, United States	Return to Light Heavyweight.
Loss	26–9	Gegard Mousasi	Decision (split)	Bellator 228	28 September 2019	3	5:00	Inglewood, California, United States	
Win	26–8	Chael Sonnen	TKO (flying knee and punches)	Bellator 222	14 June 2019	2	0:22	New York City, New York, United States	Light Heavyweight bout.
Win	25–8	Rafael Carvalho	Decision (split)	Bellator 213	15 December 2018	3	5:00	Honolulu, Hawaii, United States	Catchweight (186.5 lb) bout; Carvalho missed weight.
Win	24–8	Vitor Belfort	KO (front kick)	UFC 224	12 May 2018	2	1:00	Rio de Janeiro, Brazil	Performance of the Night.
Win	23–8	Eryk Anders	Decision (split)	UFC Fight Night: Machida vs. Anders	3 February 2018	5	5:00	Belém, Brazil	
Loss	22–8	Derek Brunson	KO (punches)	UFC Fight Night: Brunson vs. Machida	28 October 2017	1	2:30	São Paulo, Brazil	
Loss	22–7	Yoel Romero	KO (elbows)	UFC Fight Night: Machida vs. Romero	27 June 2015	3	1:38	Hollywood, Florida, United States	
Loss	22–6	Luke Rockhold	Submission (rear-naked choke)	UFC on Fox: Machida vs. Rockhold	18 April 2015	2	2:31	Newark, New Jersey, United States	
Win	22–5	C. B. Dollaway	TKO (body kick and punches)	UFC Fight Night: Machida vs. Dollaway	20 December 2014	1	1:02	Barueri, Brazil	Performance of the Night.
Loss	21–5	Chris Weidman	Decision (unanimous)	UFC 175	5 July 2014	5	5:00	Las Vegas, Nevada, United States	For the UFC Middleweight Championship. Fight of the Night.
Win	21–4	Gegard Mousasi	Decision (unanimous)	UFC Fight Night: Machida vs. Mousasi	15 February 2014	5	5:00	Jaraguá do Sul, Brazil	Fight of the Night.
Win	20–4	Mark Muñoz	KO (head kick)	UFC Fight Night: Machida vs. Muñoz	26 October 2013	1	3:10	Manchester, England	Middleweight debut. Knockout of the Night.
Loss	19–4	Phil Davis	Decision (unanimous)	UFC 163	3 August 2013	3	5:00	Rio de Janeiro, Brazil	
Win	19–3	Dan Henderson	Decision (split)	UFC 157	23 February 2013	3	5:00	Anaheim, California, United States	
Win	18–3	Ryan Bader	KO (punches)	UFC on Fox: Shogun vs. Vera	4 August 2012	2	1:32	Los Angeles, California, United States	
Loss	17–3	Jon Jones	Technical Submission (guillotine choke)	UFC 140	10 December 2011	2	4:26	Toronto, Ontario, Canada	For the UFC Light Heavyweight Championship. Fight of the Night.
Win	17–2	Randy Couture	KO (front kick)	UFC 129	30 April 2011	2	1:05	Toronto, Ontario, Canada	Knockout of the Night.
Loss	16–2	Quinton Jackson	Decision (split)	UFC 123	20 November 2010	3	5:00	Auburn Hills, Michigan, United States	
Loss	16–1	Maurício Rua	KO (punches)	UFC 113	8 May 2010	1	3:35	Montreal, Quebec, Canada	Lost the UFC Light Heavyweight Championship.
Win	16–0	Maurício Rua	Decision (unanimous)	UFC 104	24 October 2009	5	5:00	Los Angeles, California, United States	Defended the UFC Light Heavyweight Championship.
Win	15–0	Rashad Evans	KO (punches)	UFC 98	23 May 2009	2	3:57	Las Vegas, Nevada, United States	Won the UFC Light Heavyweight Championship. Knockout of the Night.
Win	14–0	Thiago Silva	KO (punches)	UFC 94	31 January 2009	1	4:59	Las Vegas, Nevada, United States	Knockout of the Night.
Win	13–0	Tito Ortiz	Decision (unanimous)	UFC 84	24 May 2008	3	5:00	Las Vegas, Nevada, United States	
Win	12–0	Rameau Thierry Sokoudjou	Submission (arm-triangle choke)	UFC 79	29 December 2007	2	4:20	Las Vegas, Nevada, United States	
Win	11–0	Kazuhiro Nakamura	Decision (unanimous)	UFC 76	22 September 2007	3	5:00	Anaheim, California, United States	
Win	10–0	David Heath	Decision (unanimous)	UFC 70	21 April 2007	3	5:00	Manchester, England	
Win	9–0	Sam Hoger	Decision (unanimous)	UFC 67	3 February 2007	3	5:00	Las Vegas, Nevada, United States	
Win	8–0	Vernon White	Decision (unanimous)	WFA: King of the Streets	22 July 2006	3	5:00	Los Angeles, California, United States	Light Heavyweight debut.
Win	7–0	Dimitri Wanderley	TKO (exhaustion)	Jungle Fight 6	29 April 2006	3	3:24	Manaus, Brazil	
Win	6–0	B.J. Penn	Decision (unanimous)	Hero's 1	26 March 2005	3	5:00	Saitama, Japan	Openweight bout.
Win	5–0	Sam Greco	Decision (split)	K-1 MMA ROMANEX	22 May 2004	3	5:00	Saitama, Japan	
Win	4–0	Michael McDonald	Submission (forearm choke)	K-1 Beast 2004 in Niigata	14 March 2004	1	2:30	Niigata, Japan	
Win	3–0	Rich Franklin	TKO (head kick and punches)	Inoki Bom-Ba-Ye 2003	31 December 2003	2	1:00	Kobe, Japan	Catchweight (214 lb) bout.
Win	2–0	Stephan Bonnar	TKO (doctor stoppage)	Jungle Fight 1	13 September 2003	1	4:21	Manaus, Brazil	
Win	1–0	Kengo Watanabe	Decision (unanimous)	NJPW Ultimate Crush	2 May 2003	3	5:00	Tokyo, Japan	Heavyweight debut.

== Pay-per-view bouts ==
No.	Event	Fight	Date	PPV Buys
1.	UFC 94	Machida vs. Silva (co)	31 January 2009	920,000
2.	UFC 98	Evans vs. Machida	23 May 2009	635,000
3.	UFC 104	Machida vs. Shogun	24 October 2009	500,000
4.	UFC 113	Machida vs. Shogun 2	8 May 2010	520,000
5.	UFC 123	Rampage vs. Machida	20 November 2010	500,000
6.	UFC 140	Jones vs. Machida	10 December 2011	485,000
7.	UFC 157	Henderson vs. Machida (co)	23 February 2013	450,000
8.	UFC 163	Machida vs. Davis (co)	3 August 2013	180,000
9.	UFC 175	Weidman vs. Machida	5 July 2014	545,000
Total sales				4,715,000

== See also ==
- List of male mixed martial artists

Achievements
Preceded by Rashad Evans	10th UFC Light Heavyweight Champion; 23 May 2009 – 8 May 2010	Succeeded by Maurício Rua
