= Randy Blake =

American kickboxer (born 1986)

- Born: November 25, 1986 (age 39); Cleveland, Ohio, U.S.
- Other names: Boom Boom
- Nationality: American
- Height: 1.91 m (6 ft 3 in)
- Weight: 95.1 kg (210 lb; 14.98 st)
- Division: Cruiserweight; Heavyweight
- Reach: 78.2 in (199 cm)
- Style: Karate, kickboxing
- Stance: Orthodox
- Fighting out of: Tulsa, Oklahoma, U.S.
- Team: Apollo's Martial Arts
- Trainer: Dale Cook
- Rank: 4th degree black belt in Karate; Purple belt in Jiu Jitsu
- Years active: 2007–present

Professional boxing record
- Total: 2
- Wins: 2
- By knockout: 2
- Losses: 0

Kickboxing record
- Total: 45
- Wins: 39
- By knockout: 24
- Losses: 6
- By knockout: 1
- Draws: 0

Mixed martial arts record
- Total: 1
- Wins: 1
- By decision: 1
- Losses: 0
- Draws: 0

Other information
- Boxing record from BoxRec
- Mixed martial arts record from Sherdog
- Last updated on: November 7, 2014

Randy "Boom Boom" Blake (born November 25, 1986) is an American kickboxer who competes in the cruiserweight and heavyweight divisions. Known for his speed and kicking ability, he began his martial arts training in karate at the age of seven before turning to kickboxing. He initially gained recognition fighting in the World Combat League, then went on the win and dominate the Xtreme Fighting League's Light heavyweight Kickboxing Championship with numerous title defenses. Blake won the ISKA World Heavyweight Muay Thai title in 2012 before going on to compete in K-1 and Glory.

== Early life ==
Randy Blake moved from Cleveland, Ohio to Owasso, Oklahoma with his family at an early age. Inspired by the film Bloodsport, he began training in karate aged seven and received his black belt from former world kickboxing champion Dale Cook in 2003 at 16. He is currently a fourth degree black belt. He also played basketball for Tulsa Community College.

== Career ==
=== Early career (2007–2012) ===
Blake began fighting as an amateur kickboxer in 2007 and first gained recognition while competing for the Oklahoma Destroyers during the 2007–08 season of the World Combat League. Fighting in the -88 kg/195 lb division, he debuted against the Texas Dragons' Freddie Espiricueta and stopped his opponent with two successive spinning back kicks to the body, earning him the nickname "Boom Boom".

After amassing a 2–1 record in the WCL, Blake went on to become a mainstay in the Oklahoma-based Xtreme Fighting League promotion, where he won the XFL Light heavyweight (-93 kg/205 lb) Kickboxing Championship. Going undefeated as a professional at 20–0, he earned himself a shot at the vacant ISKA World Heavyweight (-96.4 kg/212 lb) Muay Thai Championship on June 21, 2012 in his hometown of Tulsa, Oklahoma against Mike Sheppard, the man who previously defeated him in the WCL. During the fight, Blake repeatedly controlled Sheppard's head in the clinch and scored with knees which opened a cut on his opponents face. This caused the fight to be stopped in the fifth round, and Randy Blake was crowned the new champion.

=== K-1 (2012) ===
Following this world title win, Blake was recruited by K-1, historically the world's premier kickboxing organization. In his promotional debut, he headlined the card at the K-1 World Grand Prix 2012 in Los Angeles on September 8, 2012 against veteran Dewey Cooper with a place at the 2012 K-1 World Grand Prix at stake. He outpointed Cooper over three rounds, winning by unanimous decision and advancing to the K-1 World Grand Prix 2012 in Tokyo final 16 on October 14, 2012, where he was drawn against eventual champion Mirko Cro Cop. Blake was given a standing eight count in the second round despite claiming a low blow from a Cro Cop front kick, but scored a controversial knockdown of his own in round three. Cro Cop attempted an uppercut on Blake after a slip but when trying to apologize, Blake sucker punched him to the canvas. Despite this, he simply did not have the power to hurt the Croatian and was outfought to a majority decision loss, the first of his career.

He rebounded from his first defeat less than a month later, knocking out fellow K-1 veteran Deutsch Pu'u with a third round high kick at Xtreme Fight Night 10 in Tulsa on November 16, 2012.

=== Glory (2013–2014) ===
Blake fought in an eight-man -95 kg/209 lb tournament as part of the "Road to Glory" series, qualifiers for the Glory promotion, at Xtreme Fight Night 11 in Tulsa on February 1, 2013. Despite entering the tournament as the favourite, he was upset at the quarter-final stage by Dustin Jacoby, a mixed martial artist and late entrant to the competition. In round three, he was caught with a punch while lunging in which hurt him and allowed Jacoby to capitalize and force the referee to call a halt to the bout. He was scheduled to face Manuel Quezada at Xtreme Fight Night 12 in Tulsa on April 12, 2013. However, Quezada was replaced by the lesser-known Jason Broom who Blake feat via technical knockout in the second.

Despite losing out in the "Road to Glory" tournament, Blake was still given his chance in the promotion and debuted at Glory 9: New York in New York City, New York on June 22, 2013 against Koichi in a reserve match for the -95 kg/209 lb tournament. He spent the six weeks leading up to the fight training at Golden Glory Breda in Breda, Netherlands and defeated his Japanese opponent by unanimous decision. In his sophomore Glory appearance, Blake lost to Brian Collette by unanimous decision at Glory 10: Los Angeles in Ontario, California on September 28, 2013.

Following this, Blake returned to the XFL promotion in Oklahoma where he scored three consecutive wins over Roy Boughton, Wayman Carter and Joe Yager, respectively, between November 2013 and January 2014. In his return to Glory, Blake replaced the injured Brian Collette to face Mourad Bouzidi at Glory 15: Istanbul in Istanbul, Turkey on April 12, 2014. He again spent time at a different camp in the lead up to the fight, training with the Blackzilians in Boca Raton, Florida where his sparring partners included Anthony Johnson, Thiago Silva and Tyrone Spong. Blake lost to Bouzidi via a lopsided unanimous decision and was docked two points in the match for excessive clinching.

Blake defeated Warren Thompson via unanimous decision (30-26, 30–26, 30-26) at Glory 18: Oklahoma on November 7, 2014.

=== Subsequent career (2015–) ===
Blake defended his XFL title against Lucas Overcast, Brian McVea, Tony Lopez, Aundre Groce, Zach Gerullis, Demoreo Dennis and Evan Nedd.

== Personal life ==
Blake and his partner have a daughter, Rogue Marcella (born 2021).

== Championships and awards ==
=== Kickboxing ===
- International Sport Karate Association
  - ISKA World Heavyweight (-96.4 kg/212 lb) Muay Thai Championship
- Xtreme Fighting League
  - XFL Heavyweight Kickboxing Championship
  - XFL Light heavyweight (-93 kg/205 lb) Kickboxing Championship

== Kickboxing record ==
Professional kickboxing record
39 wins (24 KOs), 6 losses, 0 draws
Date	Result	Opponent	Event	Location	Method	Round	Time	Record
2021-06-18	Loss	(United States) Rob Morrow	Xtreme Fight Night 371	Tulsa, Oklahoma, US	Decision (split)	5	3:00	
For the vacant XFN Light Heavyweight Championship.
2020-08-07	Loss	(United States) Rob Morrow	Xtreme Fight Night 367	Tulsa, Oklahoma, US	Decision (split)	4	3:00	
XFN Heavyweight Tournament semi-final. Morrow won the overtime round after a draw was declared.
2020-08-07	Win	(United States) Eric Lunsford	Xtreme Fight Night 367	Tulsa, Oklahoma, US	Decision (unanimous)	3	3:00	
XFN Heavyweight Tournament quarter-final.
2019-02-01	Win	(United States) Evan Nedd	Xtreme Fight Night 356	Tulsa, Oklahoma, US	Decision (unanimous)	3	3:00	39-4
Retains XFL Heavyweight Kickboxing Championship.
2018-11-30	Win	(United States) Demoreo Dennis	Xtreme Fight Night 353	Tulsa, Oklahoma, US	Decision (unanimous)	3	3:00	38-4
Retains XFL Heavyweight Kickboxing Championship.
2018-04-06	Win	(United States) Manuel Mancha	Xtreme Fight Night 347	Tulsa, Oklahoma, US	TKO	4		
Retains ISKA World Heavyweight Kickboxing Championship.
2017-06-16	Win	(United States) Zach Gerullis	Xtreme Fight Night 342	Tulsa, Oklahoma, US	KO			37-4
Retains XFL Heavyweight Kickboxing Championship.
2016-06-17	Win	(United Kingdom) Aundre Groce	Xtreme Fight Night 29	Tulsa, Oklahoma, US	Decision (unanimous)	5	3:00	36-4
Retains XFL Heavyweight Kickboxing Championship and ISKA World Heavyweight (-96.4 kg/212 lb) Muay Thai Championship.
2016-02-05	Win	(United States) Tony Lopez	Xtreme Fight Night 27	Tulsa, Oklahoma, US	TKO	1	1:57	35-4
Defends the XFL Heavyweight Kickboxing Championship.
2015-06-05	Win	(United States) Bryan McVea	Xtreme Fight Night 23	Tulsa, Oklahoma, US	TKO	3	1:53	34-4
Defends the XFL Heavyweight Kickboxing Championship.
2015-02-06	Win	(United States) Lucas Overcast	Xtreme Fight Night 22	Tulsa, Oklahoma, US	TKO	2		33-4
Defends the XFL Heavyweight Kickboxing Championship.
2014-11-07	Win	(United States) Warren Thompson	Glory 18: Oklahoma	Shawnee, Oklahoma, US	Decision (unanimous)	3	3:00	32-4
2014-08-01	Win	(United States) Marcus Sursa	Xtreme Fight Night 20	Tulsa, Oklahoma, US	Decision (unanimous)	3	3:00	31-4
2014-04-12	Loss	(Tunisia) Mourad Bouzidi	Glory 15: Istanbul	Istanbul, Turkey	Decision (unanimous)	3	3:00	30-4
2014-01-31	Win	(United States) Joe Yager	Xtreme Fight Night 17	Tulsa, Oklahoma, US	Decision (unanimous)	3	3:00	30-3
2014-01-18	Win	(United States) Wayman Carter	Xtreme Fight Night 16	Shawnee, Oklahoma, US	KO (punch to the body)			29-3
2013-11-08	Win	(United States) Roy Boughton	Xtreme Fight Night 15	Tulsa, Oklahoma, US	KO (high kick)	2	2:58	28-3
2013-09-28	Loss	(United States) Brian Collette	Glory 10: Los Angeles	Ontario, California, US	Decision (unanimous)	3	3:00	27-3
2013-06-22	Win	(Japan) Koichi	Glory 9: New York - 95 kg Slam Tournament, Reserve Match	New York City, New York, US	Decision (unanimous)	3	3:00	27-2
2013-04-12	Win	(United States) Jason Broom	Xtreme Fight Night 12	Tulsa, Oklahoma, US	TKO	2		26-2
2013-02-01	Loss	(United States) Dustin Jacoby	Xtreme Fight Night 11; Road to Glory USA 95 kg Tournament, Quarter Finals	Tulsa, Oklahoma, US	TKO (punches)	3	1:43	25-2
2012-11-16	Win	(United States) Deutsch Pu'u	Xtreme Fight Night 10	Tulsa, Oklahoma, US	TKO (high kick)	3	0:38	25-1
2012-10-14	Loss	(Croatia) Mirko Cro Cop	K-1 World Grand Prix 2012 in Tokyo final 16, First Round	Tokyo, Japan	Decision (majority)	3	3:00	24-1
2012-09-08	Win	(United States) Dewey Cooper	K-1 World Grand Prix 2012 in Los Angeles	Los Angeles, California, US	Decision (unanimous)	3	3:00	24-0
2012-06-01	Win	(United States) Mike Sheppard	Xtreme Fight Night 7	Tulsa, Oklahoma, US	TKO (cut)	5	0:21	
Wins the ISKA World Heavyweight (-96.4 kg/212 lb) Muay Thai Championship.
2011-11-18	Win	(United States) Marvin Eastman	Xtreme Fight Night 5	Tulsa, Oklahoma, US	KO (punches)	1		
Defends the XFL Light heavyweight (-93 kg/205 lb) Kickboxing Championship.
2011-08-26	Win	(United States) Chris Bell	Xtreme Fight Night 4	Tulsa, Oklahoma, US	KO	1	1:09	
Defends the XFL Light heavyweight (-93 kg/205 lb) Kickboxing Championship.
2011-05-13	Win	(United States) Myron Dennis	Xtreme Fight Night 3	Tulsa, Oklahoma, US	KO (punches and right knee)	4		
Defends the XFL Light heavyweight (-93 kg/205 lb) Kickboxing Championship.
2011-02-25	Win	(United States) Myron Dennis	Xtreme Fight Night 2	Tulsa, Oklahoma, US	Decision (split)	5	3:00	
Defends the XFL Light heavyweight (-93 kg/205 lb) Kickboxing Championship.
2010-07-30	Win	(United States) Chris Bell	XFL: Rumble on the River 1	Tulsa, Oklahoma, US	Decision (unanimous)	5	3:00	
Defends the XFL Light heavyweight (-93 kg/205 lb) Kickboxing Championship.
2010-06-25	Win	(United States) Ryan Lopez	Xtreme Fighting League	Tulsa, Oklahoma, US	KO (punches)	1	1:03	
2010-03-06	Win	(United States) Casey Rich	XFL: March Badness	Bixby, Oklahoma, US	KO (right high kick and right cross)	1	0:31	
2009-06-12	Win	(United States) Brandon Gaines	XFL: Bad Intentions	Tulsa, Oklahoma, US	Decision (unanimous)	3	3:00	
2009-03-06	Win	(United States) Eric Braly	XFL: Collision Course	Tulsa, Oklahoma, US	KO (right hook)	3		

Amateur kickboxing record
Date	Result	Opponent	Event	Location	Method	Round	Time
2008-05-03	Win	(United States) Adrian Bio	World Combat League	San Antonio, Texas, US	Decision	2	3:00
2008-02-23	Loss	(United States) Mike Sheppard	World Combat League	Tulsa, Oklahoma, US	Decision	2	3:00
2008-00-00	Win	(United States) Freddie Espiricueta	World Combat League	United States	KO (spinning back kick)	1	
Legend: Win Loss Draw/no contest Notes

== Professional boxing record ==
2 wins (2 knockouts, 0 decisions), 1 loss, 0 draws
Res.	Record	Opponent	Type	Rd., Time	Date	Location	Notes
Loss	2–1	(United States) Nick Jones	UD	4	2020-01-23	(United States) Criterion Event Center, Oklahoma City, Oklahoma	
Win	2–0	(United States) Arthur Parker	TKO	2 (4)	2016-01-14	(United States) Chevrolet Event Center, Oklahoma City, Oklahoma	
Win	1–0	(United States) Chester Burton	RTD	1 (4), 3:00	2015-04-23	(United States) River Spirit Casino, Tulsa, Oklahoma	Professional debut.

== Mixed martial arts record ==
Professional record breakdown
1 match	1 win	0 losses
By decision	1	0

Res.	Record	Opponent	Method	Event	Date	Round	Time	Location	Notes
Win	1–0	Rudy Sylvester Lindsey	Decision (unanimous)	XFL – Xtreme Fighting League	Aug 16, 2008	3	3:00	Miami, Oklahoma, United States	
