= Greg Jones (wrestler) =

American sport wrestler (born 1982)

Personal information
- Born: August 10, 1982 (age 43) Slickville, Pennsylvania, U.S.
- Occupation: Wrestling coach at Kill Cliff FC
- Weight: 185 lb (84 kg; 13 st 3 lb)

Sport
- Sport: Wrestling
- Event: Folkstyle
- University team: West Virginia University
Medal record
Men's collegiate wrestling
Representing the West Virginia Mountaineers
NCAA Division I Championships
Gold medal – first place	2002 Albany	174 lb
Gold medal – first place	2004 St. Louis	184 lb
Gold medal – first place	2005 St. Louis	184 lb

Greg Jones (born August 10, 1982) is an American former collegiate wrestler. At West Virginia University, Jones won three NCAA Division I wrestling titles. Shortly after his 5-3 decision of Cornell's Tyler Baier in the 184 pound finals, Jones was named the 2005 tournament's Most Outstanding Wrestler. In addition to his title in 2005, Jones won the 184 pound title in 2004 and the 174 pound title as a freshman in 2002. As of 2023, Jones serves as the head wrestling coach at MMA gym Kill Cliff FC in Deerfield Beach, Florida.

== Background ==
Greg Jones was born on August 10, 1982, in Greensburg, Pennsylvania. He was the third of five children. Greg's older brother Vertus was a three-time All-American wrestler. Both brothers were inducted into the West Virginia Mountaineers Hall of Fame in 2019. In Greensburg-Salem School District Jones won the PIAA championship as a member of the Greensburg-Salem Golden Lions wrestling team and was a two-time state champion. Greg went on to win three national championships as a member of the West Virginia University Mountaineers. He set his high school's record for career wins. Despite not playing football in college, Jones worked out for the Pittsburgh Steelers of the National Football League prior to the 2005 NFL draft.

=== Coaching ===
Jones went on to coach for the Mountaineer wrestling team for nine years until he was offered a head coach wrestling position at Blackzilians in the summer of 2014. Jones has been one of the top wrestling coaches in MMA training top contenders such as Rashad Evans, Anthony Johnson, Michael Johnson, and Eddie Alvarez.
