= World Series of Fighting 20: Branch vs. McElligott =

World Series of Fighting MMA event in 2015

- Promotion: World Series of Fighting
- Date: April 10, 2015
- Venue: Foxwoods Resort Casino
- City: Mashantucket, Connecticut, United States
- Attendance: 3,894

Event chronology
World Series of Fighting 19: Gaethje vs. Palomino	World Series of Fighting 20: Branch vs. McElligott	World Series of Fighting 21: Palmer vs. Horodecki

World Series of Fighting 20: Branch vs. McElligott was a mixed martial arts event held April 10, 2015 in Mashantucket, Connecticut, United States. This event aired on NBCSN in the U.S and on TSN2 in Canada.

== Background ==
The main event was originally scheduled to feature the second semifinal fight of the WSOF Light Heavyweight Championship tournament between Matt Hamill and Vinny Magalhães. But on March 5, 2015, it was announced that Magalhães was taken out of the tournament due to contractual problems between the World Series of Fighting and Titan Fighting Championship.

The main event was then changed to a fight between WSOF Middleweight Champion David Branch and Ronny Markes for the second semifinal fight of the WSOF Light Heavyweight Championship tournament. However, on the day of the weigh-in, Markes was forced out of the bout due to dehydration and was replaced by promotional newcomer Jesse McElligott. McElligott's original opponent, Steve Skrzat, was removed from the card entirely and paid his show and win money.

== Results ==
Main Card
Weight class				Method	Round	Time	Notes
Light Heavyweight	David Branch	def.	Jesse McElligott	Technical Submission (Von Flue choke)	2	1:28	(Note: WSOF Light Heavyweight Tournament Semifinal.)
Lightweight	Nick Newell	def.	Joe Condon	Decision (unanimous) (29–28, 29–28, 29–28)	3	5:00
Catchweight (176 lbs)	Emmanuel Walo	def.	Phoenix Jones	Decision (unanimous) (29–28, 29–28, 29–28)	3	5:00
Heavyweight	Steve Mocco	def.	Juilano Coutinho	TKO (punches)	1	4:02
Lightweight	Azamat Dugulubgov	def.	Lucas Montoya	TKO (arm injury)	1	3:39
Preliminary Card
Lightweight	Islam Mamedov	def.	Leon Davis	TKO (punches)	1	4:41
Featherweight	Saul Almeida	def.	Chris Foster	Decision (split) (29–28, 28–29, 30–27)	3	5:00
Welterweight	Matt Secor	def.	Chip Moraza-Pollard	Decision (unanimous) (29–28, 29–28, 30–27)	3	5:00
Catchweight (131 lbs)	Darren Mima	def.	Johnny Campbell	Decision (unanimous) (30–27, 30–27, 30–26)	3	5:00

=== Tournament bracket ===
Semifinals
David Branch	SUB
Jesse McElligott	2
Thiago Silva	TKO
Teddy Holder	1

Finals
David Branch
Teddy Holder

== See also ==
- List of WSOF champions
- List of WSOF events
