= Henri Hooft =

Dutch kickboxer and coach

- Born: 21 May 1969 (age 57); The Hague, Netherlands
- Other names: Harry Hooft
- Height: 6 ft 4 in (193 cm)
- Division: Heavyweight
- Style: Kickboxing
- Team: Kill Cliff FC (2017–present); Blackzilians (2011–2017); Team Mr. Perfect (2009–2011); Team Aerts (2004–2008); Mejiro Gym (formerly)
- Trainer: Rob Kaman, Jan Plas

Other information
- Notable students: Tyrone Spong, Rashad Evans, Vitor Belfort, Anthony Johnson, Michael Johnson, Eddie Alvarez, Kamaru Usman, Jake Shields, Matt Mitrione, Abel Trujillo, Gilbert Burns, Luke Rockhold, Robbie Lawler, Aung La Nsang, Derek Brunson, Michael Chandler, Shavkat Rakhmonov

Henri Hooft, also known as Harry Hooft (born May 21, 1969), is a Dutch former kickboxer and trainer. He is the head trainer at Kill Cliff FC and formerly the Blackzilians.

== Career ==
Hooft was born and raised in The Hague, Netherlands. At the age of 15, he became interested in combat sports. He started training with his brother in full contact karate, but later switched to kickboxing. He already began competing after training for three months, winning several competitions. At the age of 18, he was invited by Dutch kickboxing world champion Rob Kaman to move to Thailand to train with him. There, he discovered Thai boxing.

Hooft began fighting professionally while coaching at the same time. He developed his own fighting system by combining the best of Thai boxing and Dutch kickboxing. He competed in more than 100 kickboxing fights. His most notable fight was against Stefan Leko at the K-1 Grand Prix '99, which he lost by knockout in the first round. In 2004, he joined Team Aerts as the sparring partner and trainer of three-time K-1 champion Peter Aerts, training out of Kops Gym in Amsterdam under Jan Plas. In 2007, he retired from fighting and continued as a trainer. Among the fighters he trained was kickboxing world champion Tyrone Spong.

In 2011, Hooft joined the mixed martial arts gym the Blackzilians in Florida, after he was brought in by Tyrone Spong, who was invited by Rashad Evans to train with him. There, he went on to become the head stand-up coach. In 2017, he founded his own gym Combat Club, later rebranded as Kill Cliff FC. Hooft trained top contenders such as Rashad Evans, Vitor Belfort, Anthony Johnson, Michael Johnson, Eddie Alvarez, Kamaru Usman, Michael Chandler, Luke Rockhold, Gilbert Burns and Shavkat Rakhmonov.

== Fight record ==
Kickboxing record (incomplete)
Date	Result	Opponent	Event	Location	Method	Round	Time
2007-02-17	Loss	(Netherlands) Gökhan Saki	Gala in Margriethal	Schiedam, Netherlands	KO (left cross)	1	1:14
2005-04-3	Win	(Hungary) Tommy Varga	Leo De Snoo Memorial 2005	Rotterdam, Netherlands	TKO (retirement)		
2003-06-04	Loss	(Morocco) Samir Benazzouz	K-1 World Grand Prix 2003 Preliminary Holland	Zoetermeer, Netherlands	Decision (majority)	3	3:00
2000-01-23	Loss	(Belarus) Alexey Ignashov	Day of No Mercy	Rotterdam, Netherlands	Decision	5	3:00
1999-12-05	Loss	(Germany) Stefan Leko	K-1 World Grand Prix 1999	Tokyo, Japan	KO (right back kick)	1	2:37
1991	Loss	(Netherlands) Jan Lomulder		Netherlands	KO	3	
Legend: Win Loss Draw/no contest Notes
