= World Series of Fighting 19: Gaethje vs. Palomino =

World Series of Fighting MMA event in 2015

- Promotion: World Series of Fighting
- Date: March 28, 2015
- Venue: Comerica Theatre
- City: Phoenix, Arizona, United States
- Attendance: 4,800

Event chronology
World Series of Fighting 18: Moraes vs. Hill	World Series of Fighting 19: Gaethje vs. Palomino	World Series of Fighting 20: Branch vs. McElligott

World Series of Fighting 19: Gaethje vs. Palomino was a mixed martial arts event held March 28, 2015, in Phoenix, Arizona, United States. This event aired on NBCSN in the U.S and on Fight Network in Canada.

== Background ==
The main event was for the WSOF Lightweight Championship as champion and Arizona native Justin Gaethje made the second defense of his title against challenger Luis Palomino.

Raymond Pina was originally scheduled to face Lucas Montoya in a lightweight bout, but had to pull out of the fight a few days before the event due to an injury.

This event was also scheduled to feature the first semifinal fight of the WSOF Light Heavyweight Championship tournament between Thiago Silva and Ronny Markes. But after Vinny Magalhães and Matt Hamill's fight was canceled due to Magalhães being removed from the tournament it was announced that Hamill and Silva would face off in the first semifinal fight of the WSOF Light Heavyweight Championship tournament. However, on the day of the event, Hamill was removed from the fight due to illness and was replaced by Teddy Holder. Holder's original opponent, Jake Heun, remained on the card and fought Clifford Starks. Starks' original opponent, Eddie Arizmendi, was removed from the card entirely but still received his show and win money.

== Results ==
Main Card
Weight class				Method	Round	Time	Notes
Lightweight	Justin Gaethje (c)	def.	Luis Palomino	TKO (leg kicks and punches)	3	3:57	(Note: For the WSOF Lightweight Championship.)
Light Heavyweight	Teddy Holder	def.	Thiago Silva	TKO (punches)	1	2:00	(Note: WSOF Light Heavyweight Tournament Semifinal)
Bantamweight	Timur Valiev	def.	Ed West	TKO (elbows and punches)	1	1:39
Light Heavyweight	Clifford Starks	def.	Jake Heun	Submission (arm-triangle choke)	2	4:11
Preliminary card
Lightweight	Jimmy Spicuzza	def.	Benny Madrid	Decision (split) (30–27, 28–29, 30–27)	3	5:00
Middleweight	Joe Gigliotti	def.	Brendan Tierney	TKO (elbows)	3	4:45
Bantamweight	Andres Ponce	def.	Juan Archuleta	Submission (triangle choke)	2	0:53
Middleweight	Dan Huber	def.	Israel Aquino	TKO (punches)	1	3:03
Middleweight	Matthew Frincu	def.	Eric Regan	KO (head kick)	2	0:14
Bantamweight	Erik Villalobos	def.	Joe Madrid	Decision (unanimous) (30–27, 30–27, 30–27)	3	5:00

=== Tournament bracket ===
Semifinals
David Branch	SUB
Jesse McElligott	2
Thiago Silva	TKO
Teddy Holder	1

Finals
David Branch
Teddy Holder

== See also ==
- World Series of Fighting
- List of WSOF champions
- List of WSOF events
