= Dustin Jacoby =

American mixed martial artist (born 1988)

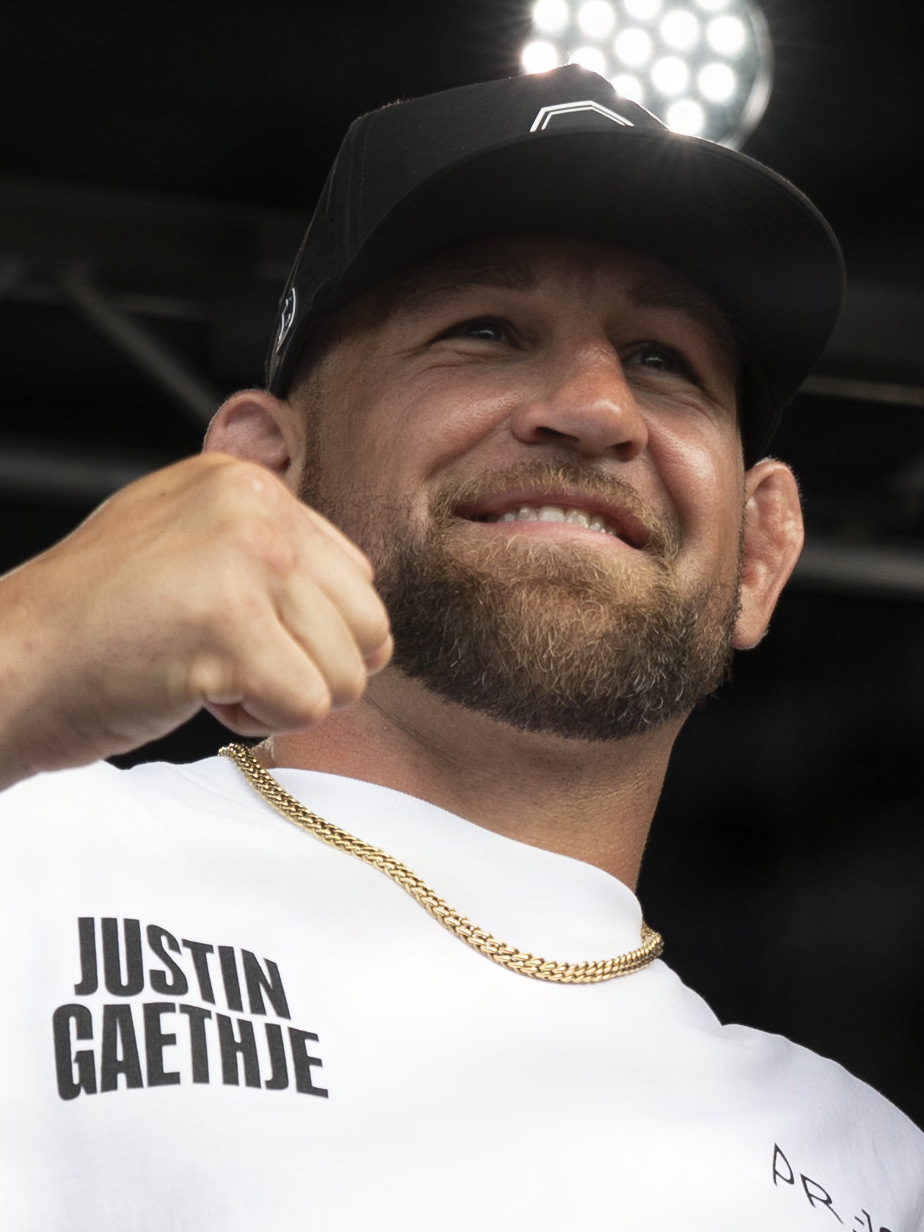
- Jacoby in 2026
- Born: Dustin Anthony Jacoby; April 4, 1988 (age 38); Fort Morgan, Colorado, U.S.
- Other names: The Hanyak
- Height: 6 ft 4 in (1.93 m)
- Weight: 205 lb (93 kg; 14.6 st)
- Division: Middleweight (MMA); Light Heavyweight (MMA); Light Heavyweight (Kickboxing)
- Reach: 76 in (190 cm)
- Style: Kickboxing
- Stance: Orthodox
- Team: Finney's HIT Squad (2010–2011); Fiore MMA (2011–2015); Factory X Muay Thai (2015–present)
- Years active: 2010–present (MMA); 2013–2017 (Kickboxing)

Professional boxing record
- Total: 1
- Wins: 1
- By knockout: 1

Kickboxing record
- Total: 18
- Wins: 10
- By knockout: 9
- Losses: 8
- By knockout: 3

Mixed martial arts record
- Total: 33
- Wins: 22
- By knockout: 15
- By submission: 1
- By decision: 6
- Losses: 10
- By knockout: 3
- By submission: 2
- By decision: 5
- Draws: 1

Other information
- University: Culver–Stockton College; Quincy University
- Boxing record from BoxRec
- Mixed martial arts record from Sherdog

Dustin Anthony Jacoby (born April 4, 1988) is an American professional mixed martial artist and former kickboxer. He currently competes in the Light Heavyweight division of the Ultimate Fighting Championship (UFC). In kickboxing, he has competed for GLORY, and in MMA, he has also competed for Bellator, World Series of Fighting, and Titan FC. He has fought as both a Light Heavyweight and a Middleweight. On November 1, 2018, he was ranked as the #8 middleweight kickboxer in the world by Combat Press.

== Background ==
Jacoby was born in Fort Morgan, Colorado. He has a twin brother, Darren, who is a former professional mixed martial artist. The brothers began training in taekwondo at the age of four, both picking up wrestling a year later. Dustin trained taekwondo for four years but continued to wrestle until the family moved to Illinois when the brothers were 12.

In Illinois Jacoby started playing basketball, claiming all-state honors while attending Triopia High School. Also playing football in the high school, Dustin had many Division I scholarship offers for both sports, but due to a severe knee injury sustained during his senior year, many of the offers were withdrawn. Subsequently, Jacoby selected Culver-Stockton College, where he played football two years as a quarterback while studying business management before transferring to Quincy University.

== Kickboxing career ==
=== GLORY World Series ===
Jacoby was a last-minute replacement for professional boxer Manuel Quezada at the Road to GLORY USA Light Heavyweight (209 lbs.) Tournament in Tulsa, Oklahoma. He had never competed in a professional kickboxing match before the tournament. He pulled off a major upset, knocking out International Sport Karate Association Heavyweight Champion Randy Blake, fellow mixed martial artist Roy Boughton and 19–0 prospect Brian Collette en route to winning the Tournament Championship. He earned a check for $20,000 and a one-year contract with Glory World Series.

He lost to Michael Duut by TKO after being knocked down three time in round one at GLORY 5: London in London, England, on March 23, 2013.

Jacoby fought at GLORY 9: New York: 2013 95kg Slam in New York City, New York, on June 22, 2013. Rematching Brian Collette in the quarter-finals, he took a close majority decision win. He then faced Danyo Ilunga in the semis and put up a good fight early, but fell behind in rounds two and three as he was hacked at with leg kicks and lost a unanimous decision.

He was set to fight Makoto Uehara at GLORY 12: New York: Lightweight World Championship Tournament in New York City on November 23, 2013, but the fight was switched to GLORY 13: Tokyo: Welterweight World Championship Tournament in Tokyo, Japan, on December 21, 2013. He lost to Uehara by split decision.

He was set to face Robert Thomas in the semifinals of the GLORY 14: Zagreb in Zagreb, Croatia, on March 8, 2014, but Thomas withdrew for undisclosed reasons and was replaced by Alex Pereira.

== Mixed martial arts career ==
=== Early career ===
During a college offseason, Jacoby took an amateur mixed martial arts bout and got hooked to the sport immediately. After the college he started training at Finney's HIT Squad and turned professional after racking up an amateur record of 9-1.

=== Ultimate Fighting Championship ===
Jacoby was expected to make his UFC debut against Brad Tavares on October 29, 2011, at UFC 137, replacing an injured Tim Credeur. However, Tavares himself was forced out of the bout with an injury and replaced by fellow newcomer Clifford Starks. Jacoby lost the fight via unanimous decision.

In his second UFC outing, Jacoby was submitted by Chris Camozzi via guillotine choke on January 28, 2012, at UFC on Fox 2. He was later released from the UFC, following an 0–2 run in the promotion.

=== Post-UFC career ===
Jacoby bounced back from his UFC stint with a pair of victories on the regional circuit. He knocked out Billy Johnson in 45 seconds at an Indiana-based Hoosier Fight Club event on June 2, 2012, followed by a doctor stoppage win over Tim Williams for the Cage Fury FC middleweight title.

=== World Series of Fighting ===
Jacoby made his WSOF debut at its inaugural event on November 3, 2012, losing to fellow UFC veteran David Branch via unanimous decision.

=== Bellator MMA ===
Jacoby stepped in as a replacement for an injured Marcus Sursa to face Muhammed Lawal on September 5, 2014, at Bellator 123. He lost the fight via technical knockout in the second round.

Jacoby faced John Salter on January 16, 2015, at Bellator 132. He lost the fight via submission in the second round.

After the loss to Salter, Jacoby decided to concentrate on his kickboxing career. He eventually returned to MMA in 2019 to participate in Sparta Combat League heavyweight tournament, which consisted of boxing, kickboxing and MMA bouts. Jacoby went on to win the tournament by beating Cody East in the final bout.

=== Dana White’s Contender Series ===
On August 4, 2020, Jacoby headlined Dana White's Contender Series Season 4 opening week against Ty Flores. He won the fight via unanimous decision and was subsequently awarded a UFC contract.

=== Return to the UFC ===
Jacoby faced Justin Ledet on October 31, 2020, at UFC Fight Night 181. He won the fight via TKO in the first round.

Jacoby faced Maxim Grishin on February 27, 2021, at UFC Fight Night 186. At the weigh-ins, Maxim Grishin weighed in at 210.5 pounds, four and a half pounds over the light heavyweight non-title fight limit of 206 pounds. His bout proceeded at a catchweight and Grishin was fined 30% of his individual purse, which went Dustin. Despite being knocked down twice, Jacoby won a close bout via unanimous decision.

Jacoby faced Ion Cuțelaba, replacing injured Devin Clark, on May 1, 2021, at UFC on ESPN 23. Cuțelaba dominated the first round, however Jacoby came back in the second and third rounds with the fight ending in a split draw. Prior to the bout, Jacoby signed a new four-fight contract with the UFC.

Jacoby was scheduled to face Askar Mozharov on August 28, 2021, at UFC on ESPN 30. However, Mazharov was removed from the event for undisclosed reasons and was replaced by Darren Stewart. Jacoby won the fight via technical knockout in round one.

Replacing Aleksa Camur, Jacoby faced John Allan on short notice on November 6, 2021, at UFC 268. Jacoby won the bout via unanimous decision.

Jacoby faced Michał Oleksiejczuk on March 5, 2022, at UFC 272. He won the fight via unanimous decision.

Jacoby faced Da Un Jung on July 16, 2022, at UFC on ABC 3. He won the fight via knockout in the first round. This win earned Jacoby his first Performance of the Night bonus award.

Jacoby faced Khalil Rountree Jr. on October 29, 2022, at UFC Fight Night 213. He lost the fight via split decision. 14 out of 16 media outlets scored the fight for Jacoby.

Jacoby faced Azamat Murzakanov on April 15, 2023, at UFC on ESPN 44. He lost the fight by unanimous decision.

Jacoby faced Kennedy Nzechukwu on August 5, 2023, at UFC Fight Night 225. He won the fight via TKO in the first round. This win earned Jacoby his second Performance of the Night bonus.

Jacoby faced Alonzo Menifield on December 16, 2023, at UFC 296. He lost the fight via unanimous decision.

Jacoby faced Dominick Reyes on June 8, 2024, at UFC on ESPN 57. He lost the fight by technical knockout in the first round.

Jacoby faced Vitor Petrino on December 14, 2024 at UFC on ESPN 63. He won the fight by knockout via a straight, right punch in the third round. This fight earned him another Performance of the Night award.

Jacoby faced Bruno Lopes on May 31, 2025 at UFC on ESPN 68. He won the fight by knockout in the first round.

Jacoby was scheduled to face Jimmy Crute on February 1, 2026 at UFC 325. However, Crute withdrew due to a ruptured ACL, so the bout was cancelled.

Replacing Uran Satybaldiev who withdrew for undisclosed reasons, Jacoby competed against Julius Walker on February 7, 2026 at UFC Fight Night 266. He won the fight via technical knockout in round two.

Jacoby was scheduled to face Uran Satybaldiev on July 25, 2026 at UFC Fight Night 282. However, Satybaldiev withdrew for undisclosed reasons and was replaced by undefeated promotional newcomer Muhammad Said. Jacoby lost the fight by technical knockout via a head kick and punches in the second round.

== Championships and accomplishments ==
=== Kickboxing ===
- 2013 Road to Glory USA 95kg Tournament Winner
- 2015 Glory Middleweight (-85 kg/187.4 lb) Qualification Tournament Winner
- 2016 Glory Middleweight (-85 kg/187.4 lb) Contender Tournament Winner

=== Mixed martial arts ===
- Cage Fury Fighting Championships
  - CFFC Middleweight Championship (One time)
- Ultimate Fighting Championship
  - Performance of the Night (Three times) vs. Da Un Jung, Kennedy Nzechukwu, and Vitor Petrino
  - Tied (Khalil Rountree Jr., Magomed Ankalaev & Dominick Reyes) for third most knockouts in UFC Light Heavyweight division history (7)

== Mixed martial arts record ==
Professional record breakdown
33 matches	22 wins	10 losses
By knockout	15	3
By submission	1	2
By decision	6	5
Draws	1	

Res.	Record	Opponent	Method	Event	Date	Round	Time	Location	Notes
Loss	22–10–1	Muhammad Saidov	TKO (head kick and punches)	UFC Fight Night: Ankalaev vs. Guskov	July 25, 2026	2	4:49	Abu Dhabi, United Arab Emirates	
Win	22–9–1	Julius Walker	TKO (punches)	UFC Fight Night: Bautista vs. Oliveira	February 7, 2026	2	1:42	Las Vegas, Nevada, United States	
Win	21–9–1	Bruno Lopes	KO (punches)	UFC on ESPN: Gamrot vs. Klein	May 31, 2025	1	1:50	Las Vegas, Nevada, United States	
Win	20–9–1	Vitor Petrino	KO (punch)	UFC on ESPN: Covington vs. Buckley	December 14, 2024	3	3:44	Tampa, Florida, United States	Performance of the Night.
Loss	19–9–1	Dominick Reyes	KO (punches)	UFC on ESPN: Cannonier vs. Imavov	June 8, 2024	1	2:00	Louisville, Kentucky, United States	
Loss	19–8–1	Alonzo Menifield	Decision (unanimous)	UFC 296	December 16, 2023	3	5:00	Las Vegas, Nevada, United States	
Win	19–7–1	Kennedy Nzechukwu	TKO (punches)	UFC on ESPN: Sandhagen vs. Font	August 5, 2023	1	1:22	Nashville, Tennessee, United States	Performance of the Night.
Loss	18–7–1	Azamat Murzakanov	Decision (unanimous)	UFC on ESPN: Holloway vs. Allen	April 15, 2023	3	5:00	Kansas City, Missouri, United States	
Loss	18–6–1	Khalil Rountree Jr.	Decision (split)	UFC Fight Night: Kattar vs. Allen	October 29, 2022	3	5:00	Las Vegas, Nevada, United States	
Win	18–5–1	Jung Da-un	KO (punch)	UFC on ABC: Ortega vs. Rodríguez	July 16, 2022	1	3:13	Elmont, New York, United States	Performance of the Night.
Win	17–5–1	Michał Oleksiejczuk	Decision (unanimous)	UFC 272	March 5, 2022	3	5:00	Las Vegas, Nevada, United States	
Win	16–5–1	John Allan	Decision (unanimous)	UFC 268	November 6, 2021	3	5:00	New York City, New York, United States	
Win	15–5–1	Darren Stewart	TKO (punches)	UFC on ESPN: Barboza vs. Chikadze	August 28, 2021	1	3:04	Las Vegas, Nevada, United States	
Draw	14–5–1	Ion Cuțelaba	Draw (split)	UFC on ESPN: Reyes vs. Procházka	May 1, 2021	3	5:00	Las Vegas, Nevada, United States	
Win	14–5	Maxim Grishin	Decision (unanimous)	UFC Fight Night: Rozenstruik vs. Gane	February 27, 2021	3	5:00	Las Vegas, Nevada, United States	Catchweight (210.5 lb) bout; Grishin missed weight.
Win	13–5	Justin Ledet	TKO (leg kicks and punches)	UFC Fight Night: Hall vs. Silva	October 31, 2020	1	2:38	Las Vegas, Nevada, United States	
Win	12–5	Ty Flores	Decision (unanimous)	Dana White's Contender Series 27	August 4, 2020	3	5:00	Las Vegas, Nevada, United States	Return to Light Heavyweight.
Win	11–5	Cody East	Decision (unanimous)	Sparta Combat League 74	June 29, 2019	3	5:00	Golden, Colorado, United States	Heavyweight debut.
Loss	10–5	John Salter	Submission (rear-naked choke)	Bellator 132	January 16, 2015	2	3:33	Temecula, California, United States	Middleweight bout.
Loss	10–4	Muhammed Lawal	TKO (punches)	Bellator 123	September 5, 2014	2	1:13	Uncasville, Connecticut, United States	
Win	10–3	Lucas Lopes	TKO (head kick and punches)	Titan FC 29	August 22, 2014	1	4:15	Fayetteville, North Carolina, United States	Light Heavyweight debut.
Win	9–3	Andrew Sanchez	Decision (split)	Capital City Cage Wars 8	March 2, 2013	3	5:00	Springfield, Illinois, United States	
Loss	8–3	David Branch	Decision (unanimous)	WSOF 1	November 3, 2012	3	5:00	Las Vegas, Nevada, United States	
Win	8–2	Tim Williams	TKO (doctor stoppage)	Cage Fury FC 16	August 24, 2012	1	4:04	Atlantic City, New Jersey, United States	Won the CFFC Middleweight Championship.
Win	7–2	Billy Johnson	KO (punch)	Hoosier Fight Club 11	June 2, 2012	1	0:45	Valparaiso, Indiana, United States	Catchweight (200 lb) bout.
Loss	6–2	Chris Camozzi	Submission (guillotine choke)	UFC on Fox: Evans vs. Davis	January 28, 2012	3	1:08	Chicago, Illinois, United States	
Loss	6–1	Clifford Starks	Decision (unanimous)	UFC 137	October 29, 2011	3	5:00	Las Vegas, Nevada, United States	
Win	6–0	Billy Horne	TKO (punches)	Annihilation Productions: Riverfists	September 4, 2011	1	0:37	Cincinnati, Ohio, United States	
Win	5–0	Ryan Sturdy	TKO (doctor stoppage)	XFO 40	June 25, 2011	2	2:31	Lakemoor, Illinois, United States	
Win	4–0	Oscar Glover	TKO (punches)	Capital City Cage Wars: Fight Night 3	April 30, 2011	1	2:25	St. Louis, Missouri, United States	
Win	3–0	Ryan Braun	Submission (triangle choke)	Disorderly Conduct 1	March 12, 2011	1	1:05	Omaha, Nebraska, United States	
Win	2–0	David Gaston	TKO (punches)	Capital City Cage Wars 6	January 29, 2011	1	0:54	Springfield, Illinois, United States	
Win	1–0	Dan McGlasson	TKO (punches)	Capital City Cage Wars: Fight Night 2	November 27, 2010	1	2:09	St. Louis, Missouri, United States	Middleweight debut.

== Professional kickboxing record ==
Professional kickboxing record
10 wins (9 KOs), 8 losses, 0 draws
Date	Result	Opponent	Event	Location	Method	Round	Time	Rec.
2017-08-25	Win	(United States) Sean Choice	Glory 44: Chicago	Hoffman Estates, Illinois, USA	TKO (3 knockdowns)	1	2:18	10-8
2016-10-21	Loss	(Canada) Simon Marcus	Glory 34: Denver	Broomfield, Colorado, USA	TKO (injury)	2	0:01	9-8
2016-05-13	Loss	(Canada) Simon Marcus	Glory 30: Los Angeles	Ontario, California, USA	Decision (unanimous)	5	3:00	9-7
For the Glory Middleweight Championship.
2016-02-26	Win	(United States) Wayne Barrett	Glory 27: Chicago, Final	Hoffman Estates, Illinois, USA	TKO (strikes)	2	1:06	9-6
Wins the Glory Middleweight Contender Tournament.
2016-02-26	Win	(United States) Karl Roberson	Glory 27: Chicago, Semi Finals	Hoffman Estates, Illinois, USA	TKO (strikes)	3	2:56	8-6
2015-10-09	Win	(United States) Wayne Barrett	Glory 24: Denver	Denver, Colorado, USA	TKO (punches)	3	1:40	7-6
2015-08-07	Win	(United States) Casey Greene	Glory 23: Las Vegas, Final	Las Vegas, Nevada, USA	TKO (punches)	2	1:19	6-6
Wins the Glory Middleweight Qualification Tournament.
2015-08-07	Win	(United States) Ariel Sepulveda	Glory 23: Las Vegas, Semi Finals	Las Vegas, Nevada, USA	KO (punches)	1	2:59	5-6
2015-04-03	Loss	(Tunisia) Mourad Bouzidi	Glory 20: Dubai	Dubai, UAE	Decision (unanimous)	3	3:00	4-6
2014-06-21	Loss	(United States) Mike Lemaire	Glory 17: Los Angeles, Reserve Fight	Inglewood, California, USA	Decision	3	3:00	4-5
2014-03-08	Loss	(Brazil) Alex Pereira	Glory 14: Zagreb, Semi Finals	Zagreb, Croatia	KO (left hook)	1	2:02	4-4
2013-12-21	Loss	(Japan) Makoto Uehara	Glory 13: Tokyo	Tokyo, Japan	Decision (split)	3	3:00	4-3
2013-06-22	Loss	(Democratic Republic of the Congo) Danyo Ilunga	Glory 9: New York, Semi Finals	New York City, New York, USA	Decision (unanimous)	3	3:00	4-2
2013-06-22	Win	(United States) Brian Collette	Glory 9: New York, Quarter Finals	New York City, New York, USA	Decision (majority)	3	3:00	4-1
2013-03-23	Loss	(Netherlands) Michael Duut	Glory 5: London	London, England	TKO (referee stoppage)	1	2:25	3-1
2013-02-01	Win	(United States) Brian Collette	Xtreme Fight Night 11, Finals	Tulsa, Oklahoma, USA	KO (strikes)	1	3:00	3-0
Wins the Road To Glory USA 95kg Tournament.
2013-02-01	Win	(United States) Roy Boughton	Xtreme Fight Night 11, Semi Finals	Tulsa, Oklahoma, USA	TKO (strikes)	1	2:47	2-0
2013-02-01	Win	(United States) Randy Blake	Xtreme Fight Night 11, Quarter Finals	Tulsa, Oklahoma, USA	TKO (strikes)	3	1:43	1-0

== Professional boxing record ==
1 fight	1 win	0 losses
By knockout	1	0

No.	Result	Record	Opponent	Type	Round, time	Date	Location	Notes
1	Win	1–0	(United States) Terrence Hoges	TKO	1 (4)	29 June 2019	(United States) Jeffco Fairgrounds, Golden, Colorado, US	

== See also ==
- List of current UFC fighters
- List of Dana White's Contender Series alumni
- List of male mixed martial artists
