= Jason Strout =

American kickboxer and coach

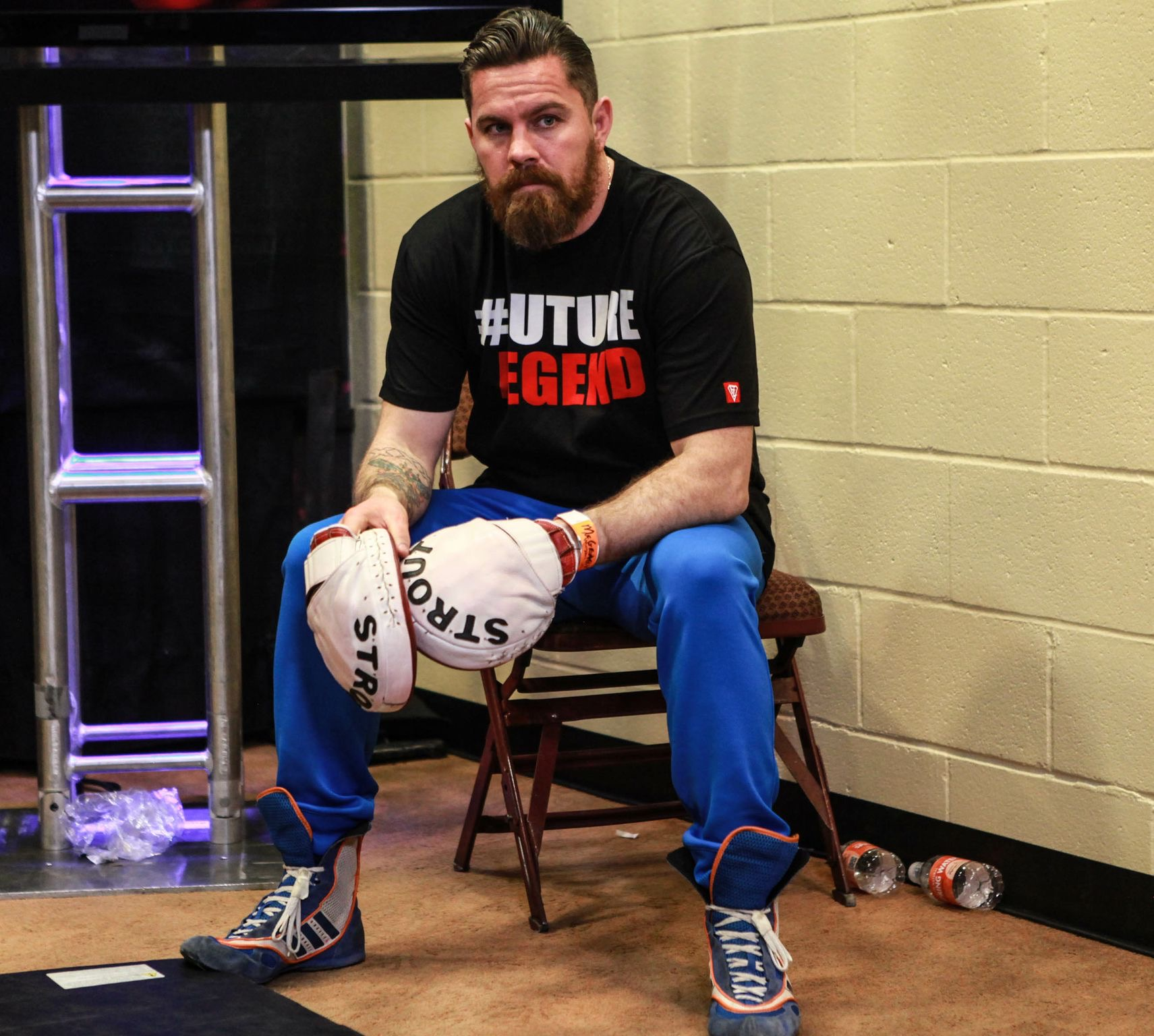
- Born: 1 May 1977 (age 49); Milwaukee, Wisconsin, United States
- Division: Middleweight
- Style: Kickboxing, Muay Thai, Boxing
- Fighting out of: Milwaukee, Wisconsin, United States
- Team: Roufusport, Church Street Boxing Gym, Kill Cliff Fight Club
- Years active: 1999–2003

Other information
- Notable students: Liam McGeary, Chris Romulo, Phillipe Nover, Jared Gordon, Wayne Barrett (kickboxer), Marcos Galvão

Jason Strout (born May 1, 1977) is an American former kickboxer and boxer from the Roufusport competition team based in Milwaukee, Wisconsin, United States.

== Professional career ==
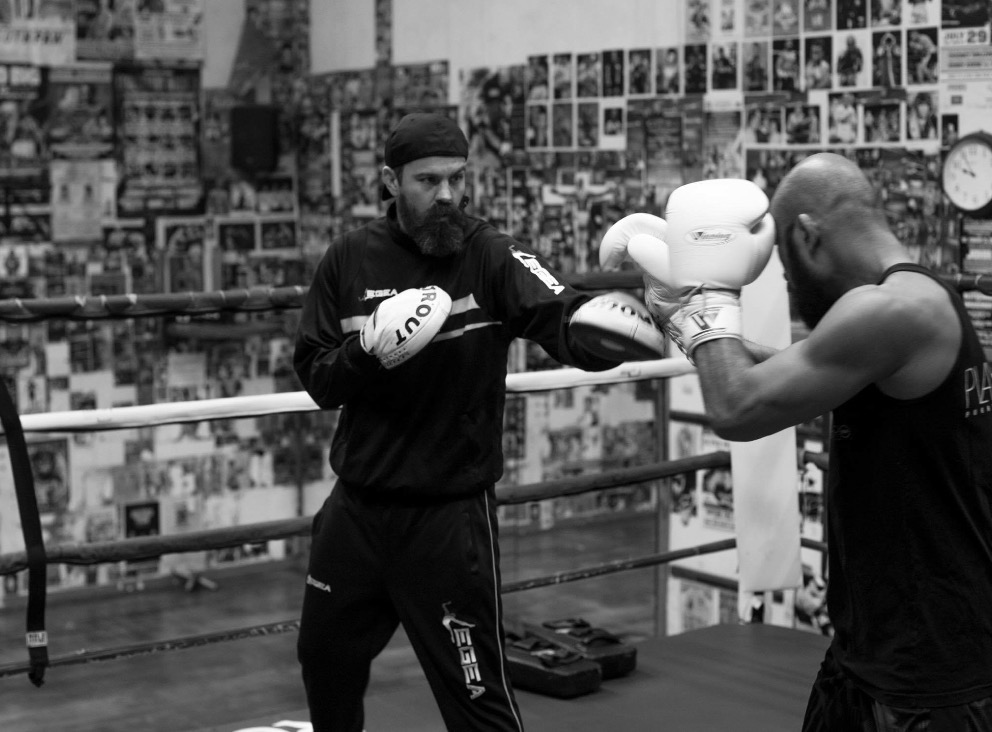

Strout trained under Duke Roufus at the Duke Roufus Gym (Roufusport) in Milwaukee, Wisconsin from 1999-2003. After Strout retired from fighting, he became a head striking coach and co-owner of Church Street Boxing Gym located in New York City. Strout is known for being a striking (boxing, kickboxing/Muay Thai) coaches in NYC with over 20 years of training experience. Strout has gathered knowledge firsthand as a boxer and kickboxer under coach Duke Roufus. In 2019, Strout became an official announcer for "Fight Sports Asia: Absolute Muay Thai." In 2020, Strout relocated back to the USA and now is currently coaching at Kill Cliff FC gym located in Deerfield Beach, Florida.

He has trained David Branch, Chris Romulo, Liam McGeary, Phillipe Nover, Jared Gordon, Wayne Barrett and Marcos Galvão.

== See also ==
- List of male kickboxers
- Muay Thai
- Boxing
- World Kickboxing Association
- International Kickboxing Federation
- UFC
- Bellator MMA
- MMA
