= World Series of Fighting 1: Arlovski vs. Cole =

World Series of Fighting MMA event in 2012

- The poster for World Series of Fighting 1: Arlovski vs. Cole
- Promotion: World Series of Fighting
- Date: November 3, 2012
- Venue: Planet Hollywood
- City: Paradise, Nevada, United States
- Attendance: 1,000
- Total gate: $82,608.22

Event chronology
World Series of Fighting 1: Arlovski vs. Cole	World Series of Fighting 2: Arlovski vs. Johnson

World Series of Fighting 1: Arlovski vs. Cole was the inaugural event of the promotion held on November 3, 2012 at the Planet Hollywood Resort and Casino in Las Vegas, United States. The main card began at 10:30 p.m. Eastern Time and the preliminary card was streamed on Sherdog.com.

== Background ==
The event underwent changes, as Gesias Cavalcante was originally scheduled to face John Gunderson, but instead faced TJ O'Brien. Also, a bout between Waylon Lowe and Fabio Mello was scrapped for unknown reasons.

Kickboxing star Tyrone Spong made his MMA debut at this event.

The event was deemed as a success by many critics.

== Results ==
Main Card
Weight class				Method	Round	Time	Notes
Heavyweight	Andrei Arlovski	def.	Devin Cole	TKO (punches)	1	2:37
Light Heavyweight	Anthony Johnson	def.	D.J. Linderman	KO (punch)	1	3:58
Bantamweight	Marlon Moraes	def.	Miguel Torres	Decision (split) (30–27, 28–29, 29–28)	3	5:00
Light Heavyweight	Tyrone Spong	def.	Travis Bartlett	KO (punch)	1	3:15
Welterweight	Tyson Steele	def.	Gregor Gracie	TKO (knee and punches)	1	4:52
Preliminary Card (Sherdog.com)
Lightweight	Brian Cobb	def.	Ronys Torres	Decision (split) (29–28, 28–29, 29–28)	3	5:00
Welterweight	Steve Carl	def.	Ramico Blackmon	Submission (rear-naked choke)	1	2:11
Welterweight	Josh Burkman	def.	Gerald Harris	Decision (unanimous) (29–28, 29–28, 30–27)	3	5:00
Lightweight	Gesias Cavalcante	def.	TJ O'Brien	Submission (heel hook)	1	1:03
Middleweight	David Branch	def.	Dustin Jacoby	Decision (unanimous) (29–28, 29–28, 29–28)	3	5:00

== See also ==
- World Series of Fighting
- List of WSOF champions
- List of WSOF events
