= Christopher Romulo =

American Muay Thai fighter and trainer

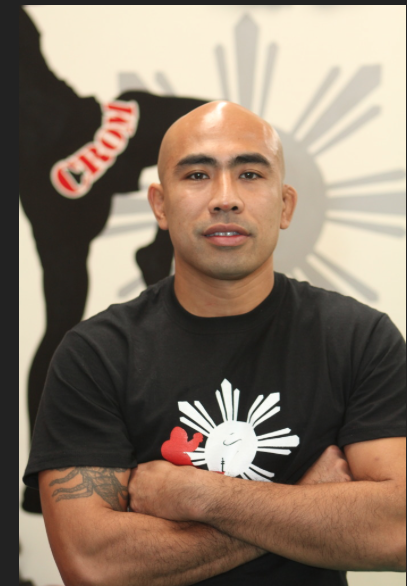
A portrait of Chris Romulo

Christopher Romulo is an American former professional Muay Thai fighter and a trainer of Filipino descent.

Romulo won several amateur and professional championships in the United States and Thailand and operates a training facility in New York City

== Personal life ==
Born in New York City, Romulo was the first member of his family to be born in the United States. His father was Carlito Romulo and his mother was Lucita Fernandez Romulo.

Christopher Romulo grew up in Queens Village in Queens where he was bullied in school for a period of time. He is married to Sarah Romulo, a fitness trainer and boxer. The couple has two children.

== Professional career ==
Romulo began his amateur career 1996 at age 21 . In 2003, Romulo began training under Jason Strout. That same year, they worked together to develop Church Street Boxing Gym's first Muay Thai program. Romulo's amateur career included five titles.

As a professional fighter, Romulo's record was 13–3 [10 KOs]. He won the WKA super middleweight North American title in 2010. Romulo won a US National Championship, a North American Championship, and a Bronze medal in Bangkok in the World Cup.

Romulo always entered the ring with the Filipino flag wrapped around him like a cape.

Romulo retired from active competition at age 37 after 16 years in the sport.

== Coaching career ==
Romulo built a training center in Rockaway, Queens in 2009. It was destroyed by Hurricane Sandy but has since been rebuilt. Romulo owns and operates the training center with his wife Sarah.

== Community involvement ==
In 2009, Romulo was selected as a spokesperson for the anti-bullying campaign Bullying...We're Kickin’ It.

Romulo is also actively involved in the Muaythai Preservation Project which provides support for local children through scholarships to train and learn the sport.

== Professional record ==
- Amateur Muay Thai: 18–3–1
- Professional Muay Thai: 13-3
- Shootfighting: 2-2

== See also ==
- List of male kickboxers
- Muay Thai
- World Kickboxing Association
