= Blackzilians =

MMA training facility and team in South Florida

- Est.: 2011 (start); 2017 (defunct)
- Primary trainers: Neil Melanson; Henri Hooft; Greg Jones
- Past titleholders: Rashad Evans; Miguel Torres; Ryan Jimmo; Vitor Belfort; Eddie Alvarez; Kamaru Usman
- Training facilities: Boca Raton, Florida

The Blackzilians was a professional team of fighters in mixed martial arts, boxing, kickboxing, amateur wrestling, and catch wrestling located in South Florida. The team had included former UFC champions Rashad Evans, Vitor Belfort, Eddie Alvarez, and Kamaru Usman.

== History ==
Owned by Glenn Robinson, Blackzilians, started when MMA fighters Jorge Santiago, Danillo Villefort, Yuri Villefort, and Gesias Cavalcante left American Top Team. The name 'Blackzilians' was coined when Strikeforce Middleweight Danillo Villefort was looking through their management's website and pointed out to Robinson that every fighter (at the time) was Black or Brazilian.

It was reported on September 20, 2018, that Glenn Robinson, Blackzilians founder, had died of a suspected heart attack.

As of 2017, the Blackzilians as a gym is considered defunct. Many of its members have left to join Combat Club, now Kill Cliff Fight Club (founded by Blackzilians trainers Henri Hooft and Greg Jones) which is considered a successor to the Blackzilians.

== Instructors ==
- Henri Hooft, head and striking coach
- Greg Jones, Wrestling coach
- Neil Melanson, head grappling coach. His style is heavily influenced by the Hayastan school which mixes Catch as catch can wrestling with Judo and Sambo.
- Jorge Santiago, Brazilian Jiu-Jitsu coach

== Notable fighters ==
- Boxing
  - (Cuba) Guillermo Rigondeaux (WBA, WBO, Summer Olympics)
  - (Cuba) Idel Torriente (Summer Olympics)
- Kickboxing
  - (Brazil) Cosmo Alexandre (ONE FC, Bellator, K-1, It's Showtime)
  - (United States) Randy Blake (Glory, K-1)
  - (Romania) Daniel Ghiță (Glory, It's Showtime, SUPERKOMBAT, K-1)
  - (Suriname) Murthel Groenhart (Glory, It's Showtime, K-1)
  - (Netherlands) Robin van Roosmalen (Glory, It's Showtime, K-1)
  - (Turkey) Gökhan Saki (Glory, It's Showtime, K-1)(UFC]
  - (Australia) Paul Slowinski (SUPERKOMBAT, K-1)
  - (Romania) Andrei Stoica (Glory, SUPERKOMBAT, K-1)
  - (Suriname) Tyrone Spong (WSOF, Glory, It's Showtime, K-1)
  - (Netherlands) Rico Verhoeven (Glory, It's Showtime, SUPERKOMBAT, K-1)
- Mixed martial arts
  - (United States) Rashad Evans (UFC)
  - (United States) Anthony Johnson (UFC, WSOF)
  - (Brazil) Thiago Silva (UFC, WSOF)
  - (Brazil) Vitor Belfort (UFC, Affliction, Pride FC)
  - (Brazil) Cezar Ferreira (UFC)
  - (United States) Eddie Alvarez (ONE FC, UFC, Bellator)
  - (United States) Matt Mitrione (Bellator, UFC)
  - (United States) Michael Johnson (UFC)
  - (Canada) Ryan Jimmo (UFC, MFC)
  - (Brazil) Fabio Mello (Bellator FC, Pride FC)
  - (Brazil) Marcus Aurélio (UFC, Pride FC)
  - (Brazil) Jorge Santiago (UFC, Strikeforce, Sengoku)
  - (Afghanistan) Siyar Bahadurzada (UFC, Sengoku, Shooto)
  - (Brazil) Gesias Cavalcante (Strikeforce, Shooto, K-1)
  - (Brazil) Guto Inocente (Strikeforce, UFC)
  - (Brazil) Braulio Estima (ADCC)
  - (United States) Miguel Torres (UFC, WEC)
  - (Brazil) Danillo Villefort (UFC, WEC, Strikeforce)
  - (Brazil) Yuri Villefort (UFC, Strikeforce)
  - (United States) Abel Trujillo (UFC)
  - (Brazil) Luiz Firmino (Pride FC, Shooto, DREAM)
  - (Canada) Claude Patrick (UFC, KOTC)
  - (United States) Ryan LaFlare (UFC)
  - (Brazil) Gilbert Burns (UFC, BJJ World Champion)
  - (Finland) Tom Niinimäki (UFC)
  - (Switzerland) Volkan Oezdemir (UFC, SUPERKOMBAT, Bellator)
  - (Netherlands) Alistair Overeem (Strikeforce, Pride FC, DREAM, UFC)
  - (Netherlands) Stefan Struve (UFC)
  - (Netherlands) Hans Stringer (UFC, WSOF)
  - (Nigeria) Kamaru Usman (UFC)
  - (Russia) / (Chechnya) Beslan Isaev (M-1 Global and ACB)
  - (Russia) / (Chechnya) Musa Khamanaev (M-1 Global Lightweight Champion and Combat Sambo World Champion)

== See also ==
- List of Top Professional MMA Training Camps
