= Clifford Starks =

American mixed martial arts fighter

- Born: April 25, 1981 (age 45); Sacramento, California, United States
- Other names: Big Cat
- Height: 5 ft 10 in (178 cm)
- Weight: 185 lb (84 kg; 13.2 st)
- Division: Light Heavyweight; Middleweight
- Reach: 78 in (198 cm)
- Stance: Orthodox
- Fighting out of: Tempe, Arizona, United States
- Team: Arizona Combat Sports
- Years active: 2009-present

Mixed martial arts record
- Total: 19
- Wins: 14
- By knockout: 3
- By submission: 4
- By decision: 7
- Losses: 5
- By knockout: 1
- By submission: 2
- By decision: 2

Other information
- Mixed martial arts record from Sherdog

Clifford Bernard Starks (born April 25, 1981) is an American mixed martial artist who competes in the Middleweight division for the World Series of Fighting. A professional competitor since 2009, he has formerly competed for the UFC, Bellator, and Shark Fights.

== Background ==
Starks was born in Pomona, California and attended Mountain Pointe High School in Phoenix, Arizona. At Mountain Pointe, Starks competed in wrestling, football, and track and field. Talented, Starks earned a total of ten varsity letters and won a state championship in wrestling. Starks later attended Mesa Community College where he competed in football and track and field until 2002 when he transferred to Arizona State University. At Arizona State, Starks competed for the school's NCAA Division I wrestling team alongside former UFC Heavyweight Champion Cain Velasquez and had a third-place finish in the PAC 10.

== Mixed martial arts career ==
=== Early career ===
Starks made his professional MMA debut in 2009 and fought primarily for the Rage in the Cage promotion in Arizona. He quickly amassed an undefeated record of 7-0 during the first two years of his career before joining the UFC.

=== Ultimate Fighting Championship ===
Starks made his UFC debut less than two weeks removed from his last fight as a short-notice replacement for injured Brad Tavares against fellow UFC newcomer Dustin Jacoby at UFC 137. He won the fight via unanimous decision (30-27, 30–27, 30–27).

Starks next faced Ed Herman on February 4, 2012, at UFC 143. He lost the fight via submission in the second round.

Starks next faced Yoel Romero on April 20, 2013, at UFC on Fox 7. He lost the fight via KO in the first round and was subsequently released from the promotion.

=== Bellator MMA ===
In September 2013, Starks made his debut for Bellator MMA. He faced Joe Yager at Bellator 100 and won the fight via unanimous decision.

Starks faced Kobe Ortiz on September 26, 2014, at Bellator 126. He won the fight via submission in the second round.

=== World Series of Fighting ===
Starks made his debut at WSOF 19. He was originally scheduled to face Eddie Arizmendi on the card. However, a last minute card change the day of the event led to Starks facing Jake Heun on the main card. He won the fight via submission in the second round.

== Mixed martial arts record ==
Professional record breakdown
19 matches	14 wins	5 losses
By knockout	3	1
By submission	4	2
By decision	7	2

Res.	Record	Opponent	Method	Event	Date	Round	Time	Location	Notes
Loss	14–5	Abdul-Rahman Dzhanaev	Decision (majority)	ACB 74: Aguev vs. Townsend	November 25, 2017	3	5:00	Vienna, Austria	
Win	14–4	Waylon Quotskuyva	Submission (americana)	Ringside Unified Fighting 22	September 23, 2017	1	3:35	Maricopa, Arizona, United States	Won the RUF Light Heavyweight Championship.
Loss	13–4	Albert Duraev	Submission (rear-naked choke)	ACB 67: Cooper vs. Berkhamov	August 19, 2017	2	2:34	Grozny, Russia	
Loss	13–3	David Branch	Decision (unanimous)	WSOF 30	April 2, 2016	5	5:00	Las Vegas, Nevada, United States	For the WSOF Middleweight Championship.
Win	13–2	Krasimir Mladenov	Decision (unanimous)	WSOF 23	September 18, 2015	3	5:00	Phoenix, Arizona, United States	
Win	12–2	Mike Kyle	Decision (unanimous)	WSOF 22	August 1, 2015	3	5:00	Las Vegas, Nevada, United States	Light Heavyweight bout.
Win	11–2	Jake Heun	Submission (arm-triangle choke)	WSOF 19	March 28, 2015	2	4:11	Phoenix, Arizona, United States	Light Heavyweight bout.
Win	10–2	Kobe Ortiz	Technical submission (guillotine choke)	Bellator 126	September 26, 2014	2	0:52	Phoenix, Arizona, United States	
Win	9–2	Joe Yager	Decision (unanimous)	Bellator 100	September 20, 2013	3	5:00	Phoenix, Arizona, United States	
Loss	8–2	Yoel Romero	KO (flying knee and punches)	UFC on Fox: Henderson vs. Melendez	April 20, 2013	1	1:32	San Jose, California, United States	
Loss	8–1	Ed Herman	Submission (rear-naked choke)	UFC 143	February 4, 2012	2	1:43	Las Vegas, Nevada, United States	
Win	8–0	Dustin Jacoby	Decision (unanimous)	UFC 137	October 29, 2011	3	5:00	Las Vegas, Nevada, United States	
Win	7–0	Artenas Young	Decision (unanimous)	Shark Fights 20	October 15, 2011	3	5:00	Laughlin, Nevada, United States	
Win	6–0	Rudy Aguilar	TKO (punches)	Rage in the Cage 152	May 21, 2011	1	1:42	Chandler, Arizona, United States	
Win	5–0	Roe Harris	KO (punch)	Rage in the Cage 151	April 16, 2011	1	2:59	Chandler, Arizona, United States	
Win	4–0	Tony Johnson	Decision (unanimous)	MEZ Sports: Pandemonium 4	February 25, 2011	3	5:00	Riverside, California, United States	
Win	3–0	Mike Heidenreich	TKO (punches)	Rage in the Cage 144	September 11, 2010	1	1:23	Chandler, Arizona, United States	
Win	2–0	Reyes Ortiz	Decision (split)	Rage in the Cage 139	February 13, 2010	3	5:00	Tucson, Arizona, United States	
Win	1–0	Chad Menneke	Submission (americana)	Rage in the Cage 138	December 4, 2009	2	1:35	Mesa, Arizona, United States	

== See also ==
- List of current UFC fighters
- List of male mixed martial artists
