= UFC 137 =

UFC mixed martial arts event in 2011

UFC 137: Penn vs. Diaz
- The poster for UFC 137: Penn vs. Diaz
- Promotion: Ultimate Fighting Championship
- Date: October 29, 2011
- Venue: Mandalay Bay Events Center
- City: Las Vegas, Nevada
- Attendance: 10,313
- Total gate: $3,900,650
- Buyrate: 280,000

Event chronology
UFC 136: Edgar vs. Maynard III	UFC 137: Penn vs. Diaz	UFC 138: Leben vs. Munoz

UFC 137: Penn vs. Diaz was a mixed martial arts (MMA) pay-per-view event held by the Ultimate Fighting Championship on October 29, 2011, at Mandalay Bay Events Center in Las Vegas, Nevada.

== Background ==
The event was originally expected to take place on October 15, 2011, at the Echo Arena Liverpool in Liverpool, England. However, due to multiple scheduling issues with broadcast rights, the organization cancelled those plans. UFC 137 featured two preliminary fights live on Spike TV.

Dennis Siver was expected to face Sam Stout at this event, but Stout withdrew from the bout on August 29 and was replaced by Donald Cerrone.

Nick Diaz, was originally scheduled to headline the card opposite Georges St-Pierre for the UFC Welterweight Championship, but promoters canceled his appearance in the fight on September 7, because he failed to make media appearances. Carlos Condit was promoted from his fight with B.J. Penn to replace Diaz and face St-Pierre.

On September 8, B.J. Penn announced via Twitter that Dana White offered him a fight he "cannot refuse" and will still be fighting at UFC 137. Later that day, both Penn and White announced that the fight would be against Nick Diaz.

On October 1, it was revealed that Tim Credeur was forced out of his bout with Brad Tavares for unknown reasons. Promotional newcomer Dustin Jacoby stepped-in to face Tavares. On October 21, Tavares withdrew from bout due to an injury and was replaced by undefeated newcomer Clifford Starks.

Georges St-Pierre was expected to defend his title against Carlos Condit on this card. St-Pierre withdrew due to a knee injury and Nick Diaz vs. B.J. Penn became the main event.

During the official UFC 137 weigh ins, Tyson Griffin failed to make the featherweight limit. Griffin was three pounds over and was fined 25 percent of his earnings causing the bout to take place at a catchweight of 148 lb.

== Results ==
Main card
Weight class				Method	Round	Time	Notes
Welterweight	Nick Diaz	def.	B.J. Penn	Decision (unanimous) (29–28, 29–27, 29–28)	3	5:00
Heavyweight	Cheick Kongo	def.	Matt Mitrione	Decision (unanimous) (30–27, 30–28, 29–28)	3	5:00
Heavyweight	Roy Nelson	def.	Mirko Cro Cop	TKO (punches)	3	1:30
Bantamweight	Scott Jorgensen	def.	Jeff Curran	Decision (unanimous) (29–28, 29–28, 30–27)	3	5:00
Featherweight	Hatsu Hioki	def.	George Roop	Decision (split) (29–28, 28–29, 29–28)	3	5:00
Preliminary card (Spike TV)
Lightweight	Donald Cerrone	def.	Dennis Siver	Submission (rear-naked choke)	1	2:22	(Note: This bout aired on the broadcast following the Diaz vs Penn bout.)
Catchweight (149 lb)	Bart Palaszewski	def.	Tyson Griffin	KO (punches)	1	2:45
Preliminary card (Facebook)
Light Heavyweight	Brandon Vera	def.	Eliot Marshall	Decision (unanimous) (29–28, 29–28, 29–28)	3	5:00
Lightweight	Ramsey Nijem	def.	Danny Downes	Decision (unanimous) (30–25, 30–26, 30–27)	3	5:00
Middleweight	Francis Carmont	def.	Chris Camozzi	Decision (unanimous) (30–26, 30–27, 30–27)	3	5:00
Middleweight	Clifford Starks	def.	Dustin Jacoby	Decision (unanimous) (30–27, 30–27, 30–27)	3	5:00

== Bonus awards ==
The following fighters received $75,000 bonuses.

- Fight of the Night: B.J. Penn vs. Nick Diaz
- Knockout of the Night: Bart Palaszewski
- Submission of the Night: Donald Cerrone

== Reported payout ==
The following is the reported payout to the fighters as reported to the Nevada State Athletic Commission. It does not include sponsor money and also does not include the UFC's traditional "fight night" bonuses.

- Nick Diaz: $200,000 (no win bonus) def. BJ Penn: $150,000
- Cheick Kongo: $140,000 ($70,000 win bonus) def. Matt Mitrione: $10,000
- Roy Nelson: $40,000 ($20,000 win bonus) def. Mirko Cro Cop: $75,000
- Scott Jorgensen: $33,000 ($16,500 win bonus) def. Jeff Curran: $8,000
- Hatsu Hioki: $30,000 ($15,000 win bonus) def. George Roop: $8,000
- Donald Cerrone: $54,000 ($27,000 win bonus) def. Dennis Siver: $27,000
- Bart Palaszewski: $28,500 ($10,000 win bonus) def. Tyson Griffin: $25,500 ^
- Brandon Vera: $120,000 ($60,000 win bonus) def. Eliot Marshall: $15,000
- Ramsey Nijem: $20,000 ($10,000 win bonus) def. Danny Downes: $5,000
- Francis Carmont: $12,000 ($6,000 win bonus) def. Chris Camozzi: $8,000
- Clifford Starks: $12,000 ($6,000 win bonus) def. Dustin Jacoby: $6,000

^Although not recognized on the official pay sheet, Griffin was fined $8,500, or 25% of his base pay for missing weight for the fight, and contracts were reworked with those amounts. That money was issued to Palaszewski, an NSAC official confirmed.

== See also ==
- List of UFC events
