= World Series of Fighting 2: Arlovski vs. Johnson =

World Series of Fighting mixed martial arts event in 2013

- The poster for World Series of Fighting 2: Arlovski vs. Johnson
- Promotion: World Series of Fighting
- Date: March 23, 2013
- Venue: Revel Casino
- City: Atlantic City, New Jersey, United States
- Attendance: 4,235

Event chronology
| World Series of Fighting 1: Arlovski vs. Cole | World Series of Fighting 2: Arlovski vs. Johnson | World Series of Fighting 3: Fitch vs. Burkman |

World Series of Fighting 2: Arlovski vs. Johnson was a mixed martial arts event held on March 23, 2013 at the Revel Casino in Atlantic City, New Jersey, United States.

== Background ==
Anthony Johnson moved up to Heavyweight to face Andrei Arlovski. According to a press release, the event peaked with 332,000 live viewers on NBC Sports Network, a peak increase of 46 percent from the promotion's inaugural event in November that peaked with 228,000 viewers. The average didn't increase nearly as impressively as the peak, but it still rose with 210,000 live viewers, compared to the 198,000 average from the first event.

== Results ==
Main card (NBC Sports)
| Weight class | | | | Method | Round | Time | Notes |
|---|---|---|---|---|---|---|---|
| Heavyweight | Anthony Johnson | def. | Andrei Arlovski | Decision (unanimous) (29–28, 29–28, 29–28) | 3 | 5:00 |
| Bantamweight | Marlon Moraes | def. | Tyson Nam | KO (head kick and punches) | 1 | 2:55 |
| Middleweight | David Branch | def. | Paulo Filho | Decision (unanimous) (30–26, 30–27, 30–27) | 3 | 5:00 |
| Welterweight | Josh Burkman | def. | Aaron Simpson | TKO (knee and punches) | 1 | 3:04 |
| Lightweight | Justin Gaethje | def. | Gesias Cavalcante | TKO (doctor stoppage) | 1 | 2:27 |
Preliminary card (Sherdog.com)
| Middleweight | Danillo Villefort | def. | Kris McCray | Decision (split) (29–28, 28–29, 29–28) | 3 | 5:00 |
| Featherweight | Ricky Glenn | def. | Alexandre Pimentel | KO (punches) | 3 | 1:51 |
| Featherweight | Waylon Lowe | def. | Cameron Dollar | KO (punch) | 1 | 2:58 |
| Welterweight | Richard Patishnock | def. | Igor Gracie | TKO (doctor stoppage) | 1 | 5:00 |
| Catchweight (160 lb) | Ozzy Dugulubgov | def. | Chris Wade | Decision (unanimous) (30–27, 30–27, 30–27) | 3 | 5:00 |
| Lightweight | Brenson Hansen | def. | Tom Marcellino | KO (flying knee) | 2 | 3:24 |
| Featherweight | Bill Algeo | def. | Frank Buenafuente | Submission (rear-naked choke) | 2 | 4:36 |

== See also ==
- List of WSOF champions
- List of WSOF events
