= David Branch (fighter) =

American mixed martial artist (born 1981)

- Born: September 26, 1981 (age 45); Charlotte, North Carolina, U.S.
- Height: 6 ft 1 in (1.85 m)
- Weight: 185 lb (84 kg; 13 st 3 lb)
- Division: Light Heavyweight (2015 — 2016); Middleweight (2008 — 2019)
- Reach: 78 in (198 cm)
- Stance: Orthodox
- Fighting out of: Brooklyn, New York, U.S.
- Team: Renzo Gracie Jiu-Jitsu; Church Street Boxing
- Rank: Black belt in Brazilian Jiu-Jitsu under Renzo Gracie
- Years active: 2007–2023

Mixed martial arts record
- Total: 29
- Wins: 22
- By knockout: 6
- By submission: 7
- By decision: 9
- Losses: 7
- By knockout: 3
- By submission: 3
- By decision: 1

Other information
- Mixed martial arts record from Sherdog

David Branch (born September 26, 1981) is an American former mixed martial artist who competed as a middleweight. A professional competitor since 2007, he has fought for the UFC, World Series of Fighting, Bellator, Shark Fights, and Titan FC. Branch is the former WSOF Light Heavyweight Champion and WSOF Middleweight Champion.

== Background ==
Branch was born in Charlotte, North Carolina, and raised in the Bronx, New York. He trained Karate for two and a half years before transitioning into Brazilian jiu-jitsu. He graduated from A. Philip Randolph Campus High School in New York, New York. Branch trained for three years with Michael Casey (black belt under Relson Gracie) in the Bronx, NY before he began training under the tutelage of MMA veteran, Renzo Gracie at his personal training center, and further developing his striking with Jason Strout (his first Head Coach) at Church Street Boxing Gym. Branch gained his black belt after learning from Gracie for about ten years. In addition to mixed martial arts, Branch has also competed in (and won) Brazilian jiu-jitsu titles in nationwide competitions.

== Mixed martial arts career ==
=== Early career ===
Branch turned professional in MMA in 2007 and compiled an overall professional record of 3–0 before being signed by Bellator.

=== Bellator ===
Branch then signed for Bellator and made his promotional debut at Bellator 11 against Dennis Olson. Branch was victorious due to submission (rear-naked choke) at 1:27 of the first round.

Branch then competed in the UCC organization and defeated John Troyer via TKO (punches) at 4:26 of the second round.

Branch returned to Bellator at Bellator 15 and defeated Derrick Mehmen via submission (rear-naked choke) at 0:26 of the second round.

=== Ultimate Fighting Championship ===
In May 2010, Branch's coach Renzo Gracie announced that Branch had signed a four-fight contract with the UFC. Branch made his debut on the undercard of UFC 116 against Gerald Harris. Branch was knocked out cold with a slam in the third round, losing for the first time in his professional career.

Branch was expected to face Aaron Simpson on September 15, 2010, at UFC Fight Night 22, but Simpson was forced to pull out of the bout with a staph infection. Branch instead fought Tomasz Drwal. Branch won the fight via unanimous decision, earning his first UFC victory.

Branch next defeated Rich Attonito at The Ultimate Fighter: Team GSP vs. Team Koscheck Finale via unanimous decision (30–27, 30–27, and 30–27).

Branch was rumored to face Dan Miller on March 19, 2011, at UFC 128. However, according to Dan's manager, the fight was not offered. Miller ended up facing a different opponent.

Branch next faced Rousimar Palhares on March 3, 2011, at UFC Live: Sanchez vs. Kampmann, replacing Alexandre Ferreira. Branch was defeated by Palhares when he tapped out to a kneebar early in the second round and was subsequently released from the promotion.

=== Independent promotions ===
Following his release from the UFC Branch signed to fight Jeremy May at Shark Fights 15: Villaseñor vs Camozzi. He won via TKO in the third round.

Branch next faced of against Strikeforce vet Dominique Steele at Pure MMA: The Beginning. He won via unanimous decision.

In his next fight Branch took on former UFC vet Anthony Johnson at Titan Fighting Championships 22. The bout was originally supposed to be fought at 185lbs, but both fighters came in overweight and the bout was changed to 195 lb catchweight fight. He lost via unanimous decision.

=== World Series of Fighting ===
In Branch's next fight he took on another former UFC vet Dustin Jacoby at the inaugural World Series of Fighting 1. He won via unanimous decision.

Branch next faced off against PRIDE legend Paulo Filho at World Series of Fighting 2. He won via unanimous decision.

On May 16, 2013, WSOF announced a four-man tournament to crown an Inaugural Middleweight Champion. Branch will be one of the four men entering this tournament. Joining Branch will be former UFC vet Jesse Taylor, current MFC Middleweight Champion Elvis Mutapčić, and former UFC vet Danillo Villefort. Branch took on Danillo Villefort in the open round of the tournament at WSOF 5. He won the fight via unanimous decision.

In the Middleweight Tournament Final, Branch faced Jesse Taylor at World Series of Fighting 10 on June 21, 2014. He won the fight via D'arce choke submission in the first round to become the inaugural World Series of Fighting Middleweight champion.

In his first title defense, Branch faced fellow UFC veteran Yushin Okami at WSOF 15 on October 24, 2014. He won the fight via technical knockout in the fourth round.

On March 5, 2015, it was announced that a semifinal fight of the WSOF Light Heavyweight Championship Tournament between Matt Hamill and Vinny Magalhães was canceled and then changed to a fight between WSOF Middleweight Championship David Branch and Ronny Markes for the second semifinal fight of the WSOF Light Heavyweight Championship tournament at the WSOF 20 on April 10, 2015. However, on the day of the weigh-in, Markes was forced out of the bout due to dehydration and was replaced by promotional newcomer Jesse McElligott. He won the fight via technical submission in the second round.

Branch defended the WSOF Light Heavyweight Championship against Vinny Magalhães at WSOF 33 on October 7, 2016, in the main event. He won the fight via unanimous decision.

=== Return to Ultimate Fighting Championship ===
On February 15, 2017, Branch announced that he had re-signed with the UFC and expects to be scheduled to compete in the middleweight division for the promotion by May.

Branch faced Krzysztof Jotko in his return to the UFC on May 13, 2017, at UFC 211. He won the fight via split decision.

Branch faced former UFC middleweight champion Luke Rockhold at UFC Fight Night 116 on September 16, 2017. Despite winning the first round, he lost the fight by a tap out due to strikes with 55 seconds remaining in the second round.

Branch was scheduled to face Yoel Romero on February 24, 2018, at UFC on Fox 28. However, on January 12, 2018, it was announced that Robert Whittaker was pulled from the middleweight title championship at UFC 221 and replaced by Romero.

Branch faced Thiago Santos on April 21, 2018, at UFC Fight Night 128. He won the fight via knockout in round one. This win earned him the Performance of the Night bonus.

Branch was expected to face Ronaldo Souza on November 3, 2018, at UFC 230. However on October 19, 2018, It was reported that Souza replaced injured Luke Rockhold who was scheduled to fight Chris Weidman in the event. It was reported on October 19, 2018, that Jared Cannonier faced Branch instead. He lost the fight via technical knockout in round two.

Branch faced Jack Hermansson on March 30, 2019, at UFC on ESPN 2. He lost the fight via guillotine choke in the first round.

Branch was scheduled to face Andrew Sanchez on September 14, 2019, at UFC on ESPN+ 16. However, it was reported that Branch was forced to pull from the event due to injury and he was replaced by Marvin Vettori.

==== USADA violation and release from the UFC ====
In September 2019, it was revealed that Branch received a 2 year USADA suspension. He tested positive for Ipamorelin, a class of Peptide hormones and Growth Factors, detected in a urine sample he provided out-of-competition on May 24, 2019. Sanction was made retroactive to July 26, 2019, and he is eligible to fight again in North America on July 26, 2021. Subsequently, Branch was officially released from the UFC on September 18, 2019.

=== Post-UFC career ===
After the release from the UFC, Branch faced Alexander Shlemenko at Russian Cagefighting Championship 7 on December 14, 2019. He lost the fight via a guillotine choke submission in the first round.

=== One Championship ===
On January 25, 2022, it was announced that Branch had signed with ONE Championship. He was expected to make his promotional debut against Leandro Ataides at ONE Championship: Full Circle on February 25, 2022, but wasn't medically cleared to compete.

== Personal life ==
Branch is the brother of professional boxers, Sechew Powell and Jamelle Hamilton.

He is also the owner and head professor at David Branch Jiu Jitsu, with locations in Hoboken and Montville.

== Championships and accomplishments ==
- Ultimate Fighting Championship
  - Performance of the Night (One time) vs. Thiago Santos
- World Series of Fighting
  - WSOF Light Heavyweight Championship (One time)
  - One successful title defense
  - WSOF Middleweight Championship (One time)
  - Three successful title defenses
  - WSOF Middleweight Championship Tournament Winner
  - WSOF Light Heavyweight Championship Tournament Winner
  - First fighter to hold Championships in multiple weight classes
  - Tied 2nd most wins in World Series of Fighting history (10) with Justin Gaethje
  - Most Submission wins in World Series of Fighting history (4)
  - Undefeated in World Series of Fighting (10-0)

== Mixed martial arts record ==
Professional record breakdown
29 matches	22 wins	7 losses
By knockout	6	3
By submission	7	3
By decision	9	1

Res.	Record	Opponent	Method	Event	Date	Round	Time	Location	Notes
Loss	22–7	Alexander Shlemenko	Submission (guillotine choke)	Russian Cagefighting Championship 7	December 14, 2019	1	4:58	Yekaterinburg, Russia	
Loss	22–6	Jack Hermansson	Submission (guillotine choke)	UFC on ESPN: Barboza vs. Gaethje	March 30, 2019	1	0:49	Philadelphia, Pennsylvania, United States	
Loss	22–5	Jared Cannonier	TKO (punches)	UFC 230	November 3, 2018	2	0:39	New York City, New York, United States	
Win	22–4	Thiago Santos	KO (punches)	UFC Fight Night: Barboza vs. Lee	April 21, 2018	1	2:30	Atlantic City, New Jersey, United States	Performance of the Night.
Loss	21–4	Luke Rockhold	TKO (submission to punches)	UFC Fight Night: Rockhold vs. Branch	September 16, 2017	2	4:05	Pittsburgh, Pennsylvania, United States	
Win	21–3	Krzysztof Jotko	Decision (split)	UFC 211	May 13, 2017	3	5:00	Dallas, Texas, United States	
Win	20–3	Louis Taylor	Submission (rear-naked choke)	WSOF 34	December 31, 2016	5	2:00	New York City, New York, United States	Return to Middleweight; defended the WSOF Middleweight Championship.
Win	19–3	Vinny Magalhães	Decision (unanimous)	WSOF 33	October 7, 2016	5	5:00	Kansas City, Missouri, United States	Defended the WSOF Light Heavyweight Championship.
Win	18–3	Clifford Starks	Decision (unanimous)	WSOF 30	April 2, 2016	5	5:00	Las Vegas, Nevada, United States	Defended the WSOF Middleweight Championship.
Win	17–3	Teddy Holder	Submission (rear-naked choke)	WSOF 23	September 18, 2015	1	2:21	Phoenix, Arizona, United States	Won the inaugural WSOF Light Heavyweight Championship. WSOF Light Heavyweight Championship Tournament Final.
Win	16–3	Jesse McElligott	Technical Submission (Von Flue choke)	WSOF 20	April 10, 2015	2	1:28	Mashantucket, Connecticut, United States	Light Heavyweight debut; WSOF Light Heavyweight Championship Tournament Semifinal.
Win	15–3	Yushin Okami	TKO (punches)	WSOF 15	November 15, 2014	4	3:39	Tampa, Florida, United States	Defended the WSOF Middleweight Championship.
Win	14–3	Jesse Taylor	Submission (D'Arce choke)	WSOF 10	June 21, 2014	1	1:41	Las Vegas, Nevada, United States	Won the inaugural WSOF Middleweight Championship. WSOF Middleweight Championship Tournament Final.
Win	13–3	Danillo Villefort	Decision (unanimous)	WSOF 5	September 14, 2013	3	5:00	Atlantic City, New Jersey, United States	WSOF Middleweight Championship Tournament Semifinal.
Win	12–3	Paulo Filho	Decision (unanimous)	WSOF 2	March 23, 2013	3	5:00	Atlantic City, New Jersey, United States	
Win	11–3	Dustin Jacoby	Decision (unanimous)	WSOF 1	November 3, 2012	3	5:00	Las Vegas, Nevada, United States	
Loss	10–3	Anthony Johnson	Decision (unanimous)	Titan FC 22	May 25, 2012	3	5:00	Kansas City, Kansas, United States	Catchweight (195 lbs) bout; both fighters missed weight.
Win	10–2	Dominique Steele	Decision (unanimous)	Pure MMA: The Beginning	January 22, 2012	3	5:00	Plains, Pennsylvania, United States	
Win	9–2	Jeremy May	TKO (punches)	Shark Fights 15: Villaseñor vs Camozzi	May 27, 2011	3	3:19	Rio Rancho, New Mexico, United States	
Loss	8–2	Rousimar Palhares	Submission (kneebar)	UFC Live: Sanchez vs. Kampmann	March 3, 2011	2	1:44	Louisville, Kentucky, United States	
Win	8–1	Rich Attonito	Decision (unanimous)	The Ultimate Fighter: Team GSP vs. Team Koscheck Finale	December 4, 2010	3	5:00	Las Vegas, Nevada, United States	
Win	7–1	Tomasz Drwal	Decision (unanimous)	UFC Fight Night: Marquardt vs. Palhares	September 15, 2010	3	5:00	Austin, Texas, United States	
Loss	6–1	Gerald Harris	KO (slam)	UFC 116	July 3, 2010	3	2:35	Las Vegas, Nevada, United States	
Win	6–0	Derrick Mehmen	Submission (rear-naked choke)	Bellator 15	April 22, 2010	2	0:26	Uncasville, Connecticut, United States	Catchweight (190 lbs) bout.
Win	5–0	John Troyer	TKO (punches)	UCC 1: Merciless	March 19, 2010	2	4:26	Jersey City, New Jersey, United States	
Win	4–0	Dennis Olson	Submission (rear-naked choke)	Bellator 11	June 12, 2009	1	2:27	Uncasville, Connecticut, United States	
Win	3–0	Robby Huston	Submission (rear-naked choke)	DCF: Battle at the Nation's Capital	December 13, 2008	2	2:41	Washington, D.C., United States	
Win	2–0	Alex Aquino	TKO (doctor stoppage)	Ring of Combat 19	May 9, 2008	1	3:29	Atlantic City, New Jersey, United States	
Win	1–0	Craig Simone	TKO (punches)	Cage Fights 6	September 29, 2007	1	1:44	Fort Myers, Florida, United States	

== See also ==
- List of male mixed martial artists
- List of WSOF champions
- Double champions in MMA
