= Kill Cliff FC =

Martial arts gym based in Deerfield Beach, Florida

Kill Cliff Fight Club
- Est.: 2017; 8 years ago
- Founded by: Henri Hooft; Greg Jones
- Primary trainers: Henri Hooft; Greg Jones; Jason Strout; Kami Barzini; Corey Peacock
- Past titleholders: Vitor Belfort; Michael Chandler; Rashad Evans; Robbie Lawler; Luke Rockhold; Logan Storley; Kamaru Usman; Aung La Nsang; Jason Jackson
- Training facilities: Deerfield Beach, Florida, U.S.
- Website: Official Website

Kill Cliff FC, officially known as Kill Cliff Fight Club (formerly known as Sanford MMA, Hard Knocks 365, and Combat Club) is a mixed martial arts gym based in Deerfield Beach, Florida. It was originally founded in 2017 by Henri Hooft and Greg Jones as Combat Club and later Hard Knocks 365 before being rebranded to Sanford MMA in 2019 after obtaining a sponsorship deal with Sanford Health. In July 2022, the gym rebranded to Kill Cliff FC.

== Overview ==
In 2017, Henri Hooft left the Blackzilians and alongside Greg Jones, founded the gym, Combat Club in Boynton Beach, Florida. This was later rebranded as Hard Knocks 365 after moving the gym to Fort Lauderdale, Florida to accommodate a bigger facility. Some of the fighters who were originally training at the Blackzilians would join the new gym.

In 2019, Hard Knocks 365 rebranded to Sanford MMA after obtaining a sponsorship deal with Sanford Health. A new training facility was opened in Deerfield Beach, Florida as part of the deal and Sanford Health also opened a supporting clinic adjacent to the team training facility.

In July 2022, the gym rebranded to Kill Cliff FC after Kill Cliff, an energy drink and CBD company acquired naming the rights to the gym.

The team includes roughly 40 fighters, 25 of whom fight within the largest three MMA promotions (UFC, PFL and ONE), as well as former and current world champions.

Kill Cliff FC is notable for producing former UFC Welterweight Champion, Kamaru Usman.

== Notable fighters ==
=== Mixed martial artists ===
==== UFC ====
- Kamaru Usman
- Michael Chandler
- Robbie Lawler
- Luke Rockhold
- Vitor Belfort
- Rashad Evans
- Gilbert Burns
- Derek Brunson
- Volkan Oezdemir
- Vicente Luque
- Michael Johnson
- Stefan Struve
- André Fialho
- Takashi Sato
- Randy Costa
- Shavkat Rakhmonov
- Li Jingliang
- Shayilan Nuerdanbieke
- Ian Garry
- Rafael Fiziev
- Reinier de Ridder

==== Bellator MMA ====
- Jason Jackson
- Logan Storley
- Linton Vassell
- Ádám Borics

==== ONE ====
- Aung La Nsang
- Martin Nguyen
- Brandon Vera

==== PFL ====
- Marina Mokhnatkina
- Impa Kasanganay
- Mukhamed Berkhamov

KSW

- Viktor Pešta

=== Kickboxers ===
- Tyrone Spong

== See also ==
- List of professional MMA training camps
