= Anthony Johnson (fighter) =

American mixed martial artist (1984–2022)

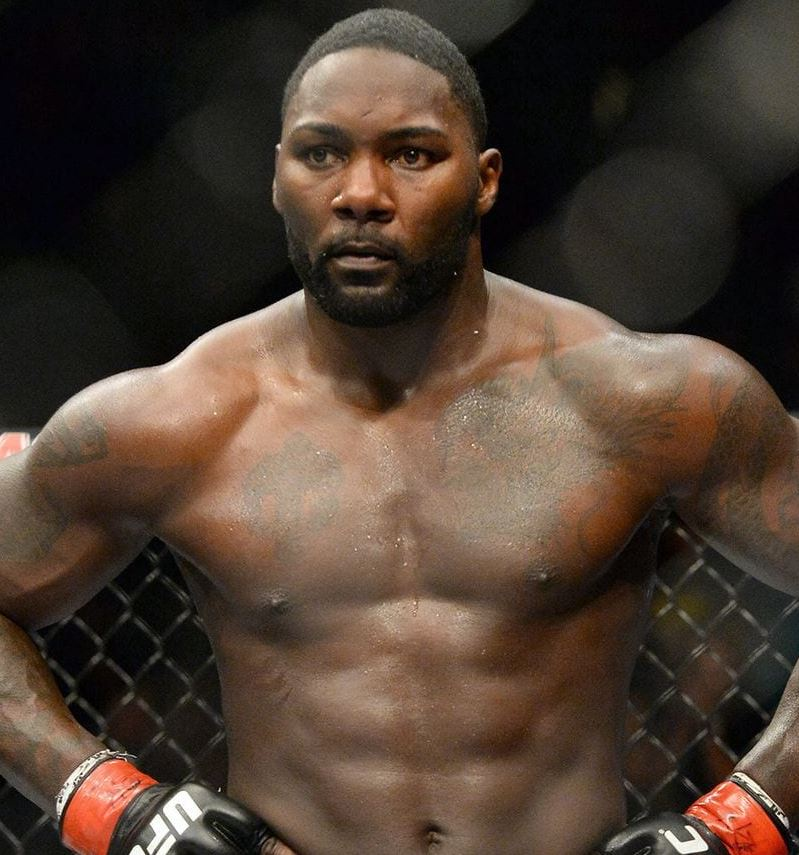
- Born: Anthony Kewoa Johnson; March 6, 1984; Dublin, Georgia, U.S.
- Died: November 13, 2022 (aged 38); Laurens County, Georgia, U.S.
- Other names: Rumble
- Height: 6 ft 2 in (1.88 m)
- Weight: 205 lb (93 kg; 14 st 9 lb)
- Division: Heavyweight (2013); Light heavyweight (2014–2017, 2021); Middleweight (2012); Welterweight (2006–2011)
- Reach: 78 in (198 cm)
- Stance: Orthodox
- Fighting out of: Deerfield Beach, Florida, U.S.
- Team: Blackzilians (2011–2017); Kill Cliff FC (2017–2022)
- Wrestling: NJCAA Wrestling
- Years active: 2006–2017; 2021

Mixed martial arts record
- Total: 29
- Wins: 23
- By knockout: 17
- By decision: 6
- Losses: 6
- By knockout: 1
- By submission: 5

Other information
- Mixed martial arts record from Sherdog

Anthony Kewoa Johnson (March 6, 1984 – November 13, 2022) was an American mixed martial artist. He spent most of his career competing for the Ultimate Fighting Championship (UFC), where he was a multiple time title challenger, before ending his career with a single fight with Bellator MMA. He fought in the welterweight, middleweight, light heavyweight and heavyweight divisions. Johnson had a small acting role as a fighter in a large international mixed martial arts tournament called Sparta in the 2011 film Warrior.

He was the number 1 ranked light heavyweight contender in official UFC rankings, and was ranked number 2 in the world by Sherdog and ESPN, before his retirement in April 2017. Johnson later came out of retirement in May 2021 and won his last fight by knockout.

== Early life ==
Anthony Kewoa Johnson was born in Dublin, Georgia. He was raised by his grandparents who formally adopted him at age 2. Early in life, his heroes were his grandfather and the football player Walter Payton. He went to West Laurens High School in Laurens County, Georgia, and then attended Lassen College in Susanville, California, on a wrestling scholarship, and became a junior college national wrestling champion. After college, he worked as a bouncer and entered mixed martial arts at age 20, after a friend suggested it due to his wrestling background.

== Mixed martial arts career ==
=== Ultimate Fighting Championship ===
Johnson made his UFC debut at UFC Fight Night 10, knocking out Chad Reiner thirteen seconds into the first round. He had taken the fight on less than a week's notice, replacing an injured Steve Bruno, who had torn his rotator cuff. He was also seen in a previous video for The Ultimate Fighter trying out for season six, however for undisclosed reasons he was not on the show.

In his next bout, he faced Rich Clementi at UFC 76. He lost the fight via rear-naked choke submission in round two.

After his first professional loss, Johnson then faced Tom Speer at UFC Fight Night: Florian vs. Lauzon. He won the fight via knockout early in round one.

Johnson's next fight was against Kevin Burns, at UFC Fight Night: Silva vs. Irvin aired live on Spike TV on July 19, 2008. Johnson was repeatedly poked in the eyes throughout the bout, with Burns receiving multiple warnings. In round three, Johnson would again be poked in the eye, resulting in a cracked retina that rendered him unable to continue. However, referee Steve Mazzagatti controversially declared Burns the winner via technical knockout. Johnson appealed the loss, but it was denied due to a 'lack of remedy'.

Johnson fought Kevin Burns again in a rematch at The Ultimate Fighter 8 Finale. Johnson won the match by knocking Burns out via head kick. The knockout was awarded "Knockout of The Night" and a $25,000 bonus.

Johnson fought Luigi Fioravanti at UFC Fight Night: Lauzon vs. Stephens on February 7, 2009. He won via technical knockout in the first round.

Johnson was scheduled to fight Matt Brown at the TUF 9 Finale, but had to pull out after suffering a knee injury. Johnson instead fought Japanese judoka Yoshiyuki Yoshida at UFC 104. Johnson weighed in at 176 pounds, five pounds over the welterweight non-title bout limit of 171, and was forced to forfeit 20% of his fight purse. Johnson knocked out Yoshida 41 seconds into the first round, but was not eligible for the Knockout of the Night bonus due to missing weight.

After his fight with Yoshida, Johnson made a quick turnaround and faced Josh Koscheck on November 21, 2009, at UFC 106. Both Johnson and Koscheck were awarded $70,000 Fight of the Night honors for the contest, which saw Koscheck win via rear-naked choke.

Johnson was expected to face John Howard on March 21, 2010, at UFC LIVE: Vera vs. Jones, but had to pull out due to suffering a knee injury in training.

After his knee injury, Johnson considered a move to the middleweight division of the UFC. Johnson indicated on the June 4, 2010, episode of Inside MMA that he typically had to lose 55 pounds to make 170. Despite this, Johnson said that although he might have taken a fight at 185, he did not plan to remain there and intended to stay at 170.

Johnson returned to the octagon in early 2011. He faced Dan Hardy on March 26, 2011, at UFC Fight Night 24. Johnson used superior wrestling and controlled Hardy to a unanimous decision victory, dropping him with a left head kick in the first round.

Johnson was expected to face Nate Marquardt in what would have been his first main event on June 26, 2011, at UFC on Versus 4 but was forced out of the bout with an injury and replaced by Rick Story.

Johnson went on to face Charlie Brenneman at UFC on Versus 6. He won the fight via first-round KO, earning Knockout of the Night honors.

For his next fight, Johnson attempted to move up to middleweight to face Vitor Belfort on January 14, 2012, at UFC 142. Leading up to the UFC 142 weigh-ins, doctors advised Johnson to terminate his weight cut and rehydrate. Johnson came in at 197 lb, 11 pounds over the middleweight division limit. The fight remained scheduled under the stipulation that Johnson would not weigh over 205 lb on fight day and would forfeit 20% of his purse to Belfort. On fight day, Johnson officially weighed in at 204.2 lb, and Belfort won via first round submission. Following the loss, Johnson was released from the promotion for disciplinary reasons due to missing weight yet again.

=== Titan Fighting Championships ===
After being released from the UFC, Johnson fought fellow UFC veteran David Branch at Titan Fighting Championships 22. On the day of the weigh ins for the fight, Johnson once again missed making the 186 lb limit for the middleweight division, as he weighed in at 194.2 lb, 8.2 lb overweight. Branch was notified the morning of the weigh in that Johnson was not going to make weight, so as a result he weighed in at 189 lb. The bout was then agreed upon as a catchweight bout at 195 lb. This marked the fourth time in Johnson's professional career that he had weighed in over the assigned weight limit. Johnson won the fight via unanimous decision (30–27 on all cards).

Johnson made his light heavyweight debut at Titan Fighting Championships 24 against former King of the Cage Super Heavyweight Champion Esteves Jones, Johnson won via TKO in just 51 seconds of the second round.

=== Independent promotions ===
Johnson fought Jake Rosholt at Xtreme Fight Night 9. Johnson won the fight by TKO due to a head kick in the second round.

=== World Series of Fighting ===
Johnson faced Bellator veteran D.J. Linderman at WSOF 1 on November 3, 2012. He won the fight via KO in the first round.

Johnson fought at heavyweight against Andrei Arlovski on March 23, 2013, at WSOF 2, and won via unanimous decision.

Johnson was scheduled to face Strikeforce vet Mike Kyle on September 14, 2013, at WSOF 5. However Johnson was forced out of the bout due to an injury.

Johnson vs. Mike Kyle eventually took place on January 18, 2014, at WSOF 8 in Hollywood, Florida. Johnson won the fight via knockout in the first round.

=== Return to UFC ===
On February 4, 2014, it was announced that Johnson signed a four-fight deal to return to the UFC and would remain a light heavyweight, and he would face top contender Phil Davis on April 27 at UFC 172. Despite being a nearly 3-to-1 underdog, Johnson was successful in his return, defeating Davis via unanimous decision after defending all of Davis' takedown attempts and dominating all three rounds on the feet.

Johnson next faced Antônio Rogério Nogueira in the co-main event on July 26, 2014, at UFC on Fox 12. He won the fight via KO at just 44 seconds into the first round. The win also earned Johnson his first Performance of the Night bonus award.

==== Suspension from UFC and return ====
On September 19, 2014, news surfaced about Johnson being suspected of domestic violence against the mother of his two children. Soon after, Johnson claimed to be innocent. Due to the suspicion, UFC released a statement that Johnson was being indefinitely suspended until the case was investigated. On November 6, 2014, the UFC lifted Johnson's suspension after the civil case was dismissed, clearing him to fight.

Johnson fought Alexander Gustafsson on January 24, 2015, at UFC on Fox 14 with the promise that the winner would earn a title shot against Jon Jones. Johnson won the one-sided bout via TKO in the first round, becoming the first to stop Gustafsson due to strikes. The win also earned Johnson his second Performance of the Night bonus award.

Johnson was expected to face Jon Jones on May 23, 2015, at UFC 187. However, on April 28, it was announced that Jones had been stripped of the UFC Light heavyweight title and suspended indefinitely due to a felony hit-and-run charge. Johnson faced Daniel Cormier for the vacant UFC Light Heavyweight Championship. Early in the first round, Johnson became the first man to knock down Cormier, but failed to get the finish. Cormier eventually won the fight via rear naked-choke submission in round three.

Johnson was expected to face Jan Błachowicz on September 5, 2015, at UFC 191. However, Johnson was pulled from the bout on July 30 in favor of a fight with Jimi Manuwa at the event instead. After dominating the first round with his wrestling, Johnson won via knockout early in the second round. This fight earned him a Performance of the Night award.

Johnson next faced Ryan Bader on January 30, 2016, at UFC on Fox 18. Bader went for a takedown almost immediately, which Johnson defended. Bader then threatened a kimura off his back, but Johnson again defended it before moving to mount and winning via knockout. The win also earned Johnson his fourth Performance of the Night bonus award.

Johnson was expected to face Glover Teixeira on July 23, 2016, at UFC on Fox 20, but was pulled from the card due to undisclosed reasons. The bout was rescheduled and eventually took place at UFC 202. Johnson defeated Teixeira by knockout 13 seconds into the first round and was awarded his fifth Performance of the Night bonus.

A rematch with champion Daniel Cormier was expected to take place on December 10, 2016, at UFC 206. However, Cormier pulled out of the fight on November 25 citing an injury and as a result, Johnson was removed from the card. The pairing was rescheduled again and eventually took place on April 8, 2017, at UFC 210. Johnson decided to use his wrestling as his main offense, a decision which frustrated his corner, and led to him becoming fatigued and losing the fight via rear naked choke submission in the second round. After the fight, Johnson announced his retirement from the UFC and combat sports effective immediately.

In 2017, Johnson switched to Combat Sports, an open gym club, and CSMMA after Blackzilians ceased operations across the Florida area.

In August 2019, 2 years after initially announcing his retirement, Johnson confirmed that he would be re-entering the USADA testing pool. Despite initial claims about moving up to heavyweight, Johnson eventually decided to stay in the light heavyweight division. In October 2019, Johnson confirmed he was in talks with the UFC brass to come back as part of the heavyweight division and would like to return in April 2020. However, he eventually entered the testing pool in late August 2020, and would have been eligible to compete in February 2021.

=== Bellator MMA ===
On December 9, 2020, it was announced that Johnson had parted ways with the UFC and had signed a multi-fight contract with Bellator MMA.

On February 9, 2021, it was announced that Johnson would be participating in the Bellator Light Heavyweight World Grand Prix Tournament. He was scheduled to face Yoel Romero in the quarterfinal round at Bellator 257 on April 16 but on March 26, it was announced that the bout would be moved to Bellator 258 on May 7. On April 29, it was announced that Yoel had failed his pre-fight medical exam and the bout was scrapped and Romero was removed from the tournament. The next day, it was announced that Jose Augusto would replace Yoel in the bout and the Grand Prix. After surviving being dropped in the first round, Johnson won via knockout in the second round.

In the semi-finals of the Grand Prix, Johnson was scheduled to face the champion Vadim Nemkov, with the Bellator Light Heavyweight Championship on the line, on October 16, 2021, at Bellator 268. On September 18, it was announced that Anthony Johnson was forced to pull out of the bout and the tournament due to an unspecified illness. Johnson was hopeful to return to action in 2022.

== Personal life and death ==
After martial arts competition, Johnson launched a CBD oil company, Competitive Body Development. In early 2019, Johnson was appointed as the head of fighter relations for Bare Knuckle Fighting Championship.

Johnson was suffering from a form of cancer known as non-Hodgkin's lymphoma and hemophagocytic lymphohistiocytosis, an auto-immune disease. He died of organ failure on November 13, 2022.

== Legal trouble ==
=== Domestic violence charges and accusations ===
In 2010, Johnson was convicted of a 2009 domestic battery charge after pleading no contest. He was sentenced to serve three years of probation. He was also charged with making criminal threats and property damage for allegedly breaking the victim's cell phone, but those charges were dropped.

In March 2014, Johnson was accused of domestic abuse in Arkansas towards his ex-girlfriend and mother of his children. A police report that was revealed to the public in September 2014 included statements from Johnson's ex in which she alleged Johnson came to her work, physically approached her, grabbed her shirt behind the neck and lifted her up from the chair on which she was sitting. She continued by saying that Johnson then grabbed her right arm and forcefully pulled on it several times to pull her closer to him, and that he verbally abused her in front of several coworkers. The police report also stated that the girlfriend had visible bruising on her arm and scratches near her collarbone. Police said that Johnson's girlfriend was crying and shaking while giving her side of what happened. No charges were filed.

Johnson was arrested on May 5, 2019, in Boca Raton, Florida after an incident with his girlfriend. Johnson's girlfriend alleged that during an argument, Johnson became angry, picked her up, and carried her into another room. Stating that she was fearful for her safety, Johnson's girlfriend then called 911. Police officers arrived and placed Johnson under arrest and took him to the Palm Beach County jail, where he was booked on charges of domestic battery (by law, any act of non-consensual touching could be considered battery). Johnson was released hours later on recognizance, meaning he signed a court order promising to show up for future court dates. At his arraignment on May 15, Johnson pleaded not guilty. The case was ultimately dismissed, with the charges against Johnson being dropped when he reached a joint agreement with the prosecutors by agreeing to attend an anger management course. In addition, he was required to attend biweekly drug testing due to testing positive for marijuana, thus neglecting his bail conditions.

=== Other legal issues ===
On May 11, 2021, Johnson was arrested in Fairfield County, Connecticut and charged with identity theft after allegedly using a stolen credit card to pay for a flight from Newark, New Jersey to Fort Lauderdale, Florida in November 2019. Johnson was released on $500 bond.

== Championships and accomplishments ==
=== Amateur wrestling ===
- National Junior College Athletic Association
  - Junior College National Champion 174 lb – out of Lassen Community College (2004)

=== Mixed martial arts ===
- Ultimate Fighting Championship
  - Fight of the Night (One time) vs. Josh Koscheck
  - Knockout of the Night (Two times) vs. Kevin Burns and Charlie Brenneman
  - Performance of the Night (Five times) vs. Antônio Rogério Nogueira, Alexander Gustafsson, Jimi Manuwa, Ryan Bader and Glover Teixeira
  - Most sub-minute finishes in UFC history (5)
  - Second most first-round knockouts in UFC history (9) (behind Vitor Belfort)
    - Tied (Uroš Medić & Vicente Luque) for most first-round knockouts in UFC Welterweight division history (5)
  - Tied (Amanda Nunes, Charles Oliveira and Andrei Arlovski) for fifth most first-round finishes in UFC history (9)
  - Tied (Anderson Silva, Thiago Santos, Dustin Poirier & Drew Dober) for fifth most knockouts in UFC history (11)
  - UFC.com Awards
    - 2008: Ranked #3 Knockout of the Year vs. Kevin Burns
    - 2011: Ranked #10 Knockout of the Year vs. Charlie Brenneman (Tied with Wanderlei Silva)
    - 2016: Ranked #2 Knockout of the Year vs. Glover Teixeira
- Combat Press
  - 2014 Comeback Fighter of the Year
- Bleacher Report
  - 2014 #6 Ranked Fighter of the Year

== Mixed martial arts record ==
Professional record breakdown
29 matches	23 wins	6 losses
By knockout	17	1
By submission	0	5
By decision	6	0

Res.	Record	Opponent	Method	Event	Date	Round	Time	Location	Notes
Win	23–6	José Augusto Azevedo	KO (punch)	Bellator 258	May 7, 2021	2	1:30	Uncasville, Connecticut, United States	Bellator Light Heavyweight World Grand Prix Quarterfinal. Later withdrew from tournament due to illness.
Loss	22–6	Daniel Cormier	Submission (rear-naked choke)	UFC 210	April 8, 2017	2	3:37	Buffalo, New York, United States	For the UFC Light Heavyweight Championship.
Win	22–5	Glover Teixeira	KO (punch)	UFC 202	August 20, 2016	1	0:13	Las Vegas, Nevada, United States	Performance of the Night.
Win	21–5	Ryan Bader	KO (punches)	UFC on Fox: Johnson vs. Bader	January 30, 2016	1	1:26	Newark, New Jersey, United States	Performance of the Night.
Win	20–5	Jimi Manuwa	KO (punches)	UFC 191	September 5, 2015	2	0:28	Las Vegas, Nevada, United States	Performance of the Night.
Loss	19–5	Daniel Cormier	Submission (rear-naked choke)	UFC 187	May 23, 2015	3	2:39	Las Vegas, Nevada, United States	For the vacant UFC Light Heavyweight Championship.
Win	19–4	Alexander Gustafsson	KO (punches)	UFC on Fox: Gustafsson vs. Johnson	January 24, 2015	1	2:15	Stockholm, Sweden	Performance of the Night.
Win	18–4	Antônio Rogério Nogueira	KO (punches)	UFC on Fox: Lawler vs. Brown	July 26, 2014	1	0:44	San Jose, California, United States	Performance of the Night.
Win	17–4	Phil Davis	Decision (unanimous)	UFC 172	April 26, 2014	3	5:00	Baltimore, Maryland, United States	
Win	16–4	Mike Kyle	KO (punches)	WSOF 8	January 18, 2014	1	2:03	Hollywood, Florida, United States	Return to Light Heavyweight.
Win	15–4	Andrei Arlovski	Decision (unanimous)	WSOF 2	March 23, 2013	3	5:00	Atlantic City, New Jersey United States	Heavyweight debut.
Win	14–4	D.J. Linderman	KO (punch)	WSOF 1	November 3, 2012	1	3:58	Las Vegas, Nevada, United States	
Win	13–4	Jake Rosholt	TKO (head kick)	Xtreme Fight Night 9	September 21, 2012	2	4:22	Tulsa, Oklahoma, United States	
Win	12–4	Esteves Jones	TKO (punches)	Titan Fighting Championships 24	August 24, 2012	2	0:51	Kansas City, Kansas, United States	Light Heavyweight debut.
Win	11–4	David Branch	Decision (unanimous)	Titan Fighting Championships 22	May 25, 2012	3	5:00	Kansas City, Kansas, United States	Catchweight (195 lb) bout; both fighters missed weight.
Loss	10–4	Vitor Belfort	Submission (rear-naked choke)	UFC 142	January 14, 2012	1	4:49	Rio de Janeiro, Brazil	Middleweight debut; Johnson missed weight (197 lbs).
Win	10–3	Charlie Brenneman	KO (head kick)	UFC Live: Cruz vs. Johnson	October 1, 2011	1	2:49	Washington, D.C., United States	Knockout of the Night.
Win	9–3	Dan Hardy	Decision (unanimous)	UFC Fight Night: Nogueira vs. Davis	March 26, 2011	3	5:00	Seattle, Washington, United States	
Loss	8–3	Josh Koscheck	Submission (rear-naked choke)	UFC 106	November 21, 2009	2	4:47	Las Vegas, Nevada, United States	Fight of the Night.
Win	8–2	Yoshiyuki Yoshida	TKO (punches)	UFC 104	October 24, 2009	1	0:41	Los Angeles, California, United States	Catchweight (176 lb) bout; Johnson missed weight.
Win	7–2	Luigi Fioravanti	TKO (punches)	UFC Fight Night: Lauzon vs. Stephens	February 7, 2009	1	4:39	Tampa, Florida, United States	
Win	6–2	Kevin Burns	KO (head kick)	The Ultimate Fighter: Team Nogueira vs. Team Mir Finale	December 13, 2008	3	0:28	Las Vegas, Nevada, United States	Knockout of the Night.
Loss	5–2	Kevin Burns	TKO (eye injury)	UFC Fight Night: Silva vs. Irvin	July 19, 2008	3	3:35	Las Vegas, Nevada, United States	Johnson appealed for the result to be overturned due to the injury being caused by repeated eye pokes, but the appeal was rejected by the NSAC.
Win	5–1	Tom Speer	KO (punches)	UFC Fight Night: Florian vs. Lauzon	April 2, 2008	1	0:51	Broomfield, Colorado, United States	
Loss	4–1	Rich Clementi	Submission (rear-naked choke)	UFC 76	September 22, 2007	2	3:05	Anaheim, California, United States	Catchweight (177 lb) bout; Johnson missed weight.
Win	4–0	Chad Reiner	KO (punches)	UFC Fight Night: Stout vs. Fisher	June 12, 2007	1	0:13	Hollywood, Florida, United States	
Win	3–0	Keith Wilson	Decision (majority)	Rocky Mountain Nationals: Demolition	September 16, 2006	2	5:00	Denver, Colorado, United States	Won the RMN Welterweight Tournament.
Win	2–0	Rich Moskowitz	Decision (unanimous)	Rocky Mountain Nationals: Demolition	September 16, 2006	2	5:00	Denver, Colorado, United States	
Win	1–0	Jonathan Romero	TKO (punches)	PF 2: Live MMA	August 16, 2006	1	1:09	Hollywood, California, United States	

== Pay-per-view bouts ==
No.	Event	Fight	Date	Venue	City	PPV Buys
1.	UFC 187	Johnson vs. Cormier	May 23, 2015	MGM Grand Garden Arena	Las Vegas, Nevada, United States	375,000
2.	UFC 210	Cormier vs. Johnson 2	April 8, 2017	KeyBank Center	Buffalo, New York, United States	300,000

== See also ==
- List of male mixed martial artists
