= Thiago Silva (fighter) =

Brazilian kickboxer and mixed martial arts fighter (born 1982)

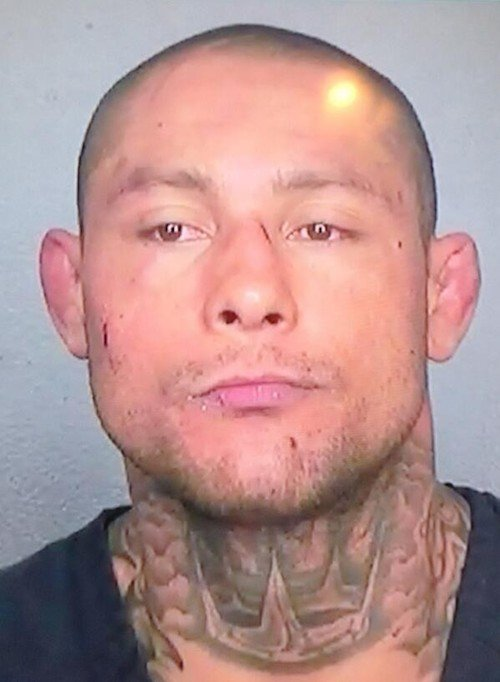
- Born: Thiago Anderson Ramos da Silva; November 12, 1982 (age 43); São Carlos, São Paulo, Brazil
- Height: 6 ft 1 in (185 cm)
- Weight: 223 lb (101 kg; 15.9 st)
- Division: Middleweight; Light Heavyweight; Heavyweight
- Reach: 75 in (190 cm)
- Style: Kickboxing, Brazilian Jiu-Jitsu
- Fighting out of: Boca Raton, Florida, United States
- Team: Jaco Hybrid Training Center (Blackzilians); American Top Team (formerly); Chute Boxe Academy (formerly)
- Rank: Black belt in Brazilian Jiu-Jitsu under Jorge Patino
- Years active: 2005–present (MMA); 2017–present (Kickboxing)

Kickboxing record
- Total: 1
- Wins: 1
- Losses: 0

Mixed martial arts record
- Total: 33
- Wins: 21
- By knockout: 15
- By submission: 1
- By decision: 5
- Losses: 9
- By knockout: 4
- By submission: 1
- By decision: 4
- No contests: 3

Other information
- Mixed martial arts record from Sherdog

Thiago Silva (born November 12, 1982) is a Brazilian kickboxer and mixed martial artist who competes in the Light Heavyweight division of Eagle FC. A professional competitor since 2005, he has competed for the Ultimate Fighting Championship (UFC), the World Series of Fighting (WSOF), Absolute Championship Berkut (ACB), Konfrontacja Sztuk Walki (KSW) and Pancrase.

== Background ==
Silva is from São Paulo, Brazil and had a difficult upbringing. He grew up in a very poor area and witnessed murders at a young age. To help support himself, he got his first job when he was only nine years old cleaning automobile parts. Silva was athletic, playing soccer and basketball, and attended school, but ran away from home at age 13 due to his allegedly abusive father, never to see his mother or younger brother again. He then lived on his own in the favelas or slums of São Paulo, moving into his friends' homes who would allow him to stay. While working during the day, he would attend school at night, and would eventually graduate high school. The Brazilian favelas are notorious for being drug trafficking hot spots, and many of the neighborhoods are ruled by drug lords, some of whom would seek out Silva to help them and their children train. At age 18, Silva began to train in mixed martial arts and due to his poverty often had to choose between eating and training although his coach let him train for free in exchange for cleaning the facility.

== Mixed martial arts career ==
=== Early career ===
Prior to signing with the Ultimate Fighting Championship, Silva fought almost solely in his native country of Brazil. During his first nine professional bouts, he attained a perfect 9–0 record, winning seven of these bouts by KO or TKO and one by submission. Silva also won the Fury FC 2 Grand Prix in 2006 and fought in a Pancrase bout against Tatsuya Mizuno before receiving a UFC contract.

=== Signing with the Ultimate Fighting Championship ===
Silva made his UFC debut against former WEC Heavyweight Champion James Irvin at UFC 71. During the first round, Irvin injured his knee after a takedown from Silva and was unable to continue the fight. Silva was awarded the win by TKO. Silva's next fight was against UFC newcomer Tomasz Drwal at UFC 75. Silva won the fight by TKO due to strikes in the second round.

Following his first two wins, Silva made his televised debut as part of the main card of UFC 78 against Houston Alexander. During the bout, he quickly exposed Alexander's ground game, which had been untested in Alexander's first two knockout victories. After reversing position and securing the mount, Silva rained down punches until his opponent was knocked out in the opening round.

Silva was next slated to face Rashad Evans at UFC 84, but Evans was forced to pull out after being asked to fill in for a fight against Chuck Liddell at UFC 88. Instead, Silva squared off against UFC newcomer Antonio Mendes. After being dropped and momentarily stunned by a head kick from Mendes, Silva survived the flurry of strikes from Mendes and managed to take him down, securing the mounted position. From the dominant position, Silva attacked with punches and elbows until Mendes tapped out due to strikes in the opening round.

Originally scheduled to face fellow undefeated Brazilian Lyoto Machida at UFC 89, Silva was forced to withdraw from the fight due to an injured back suffered while training. The fight was later rescheduled and took place at UFC 94. Machida won via one-punch knockout at the end of the opening round, ending Silva's thirteen fight undefeated streak.

Silva was slated to fight former UFC Light Heavyweight Champion Forrest Griffin, but Dana White instead chose to match Griffin against long time UFC Middleweight Champion Anderson Silva. He instead fought Keith Jardine at UFC 102. Early in the fight Silva countered an uppercut by Jardine with a short left hook that dropped Jardine, Silva then followed up with four punches on the ground rendering Jardine unconscious, stopping the fight at 1:35 of the first round.

He next fought Keith Jardine's friend and training partner Rashad Evans in the main event at UFC 108, and lost in a unanimous decision. Evans was able to keep octagon control through aggressive wrestling and takedowns throughout the majority of the fight, though Silva connected with two hooks that dropped Evans and momentarily dazed him in the final round. The judges scored the bout 29–28 for Evans, resulting in Silva's second professional loss.

Silva was scheduled to face Tim Boetsch at UFC 117, but was forced off the card with a back injury and replaced by UFC newcomer Todd Brown.

Silva fought Brandon Vera on January 1, 2011, at UFC 125. He won by unanimous decision (30–26, 30–27, and 30–27) after dominating Vera with ground and pound, including open palm thrusts which resulted in Vera's nose being broken.

=== UFC 125 drug test ===
Silva was expected to face the former UFC Light Heavyweight Champion Quinton Jackson on May 28, 2011, at UFC 130, although there were rumors that the fight had been canceled due to injury or failed drug tests from his UFC 125 bout. In a statement with Brazilian MMA site Tatame, Thiago denied that he was injured; "Injured? Me? I’m very healthy. That’s not true and looks like the NSAC did two tests, one was positive and the other negative, I'm calm."

Following this statement, Keith Kizer, the commissioner of the NSAC, confirmed that Thiago Silva's samples were still undergoing tests; "That’s not accurate. We have gotten only the first sample back. It could be weeks before we find out the results for the second test." The UFC didn't want to take any chances in waiting for the second test for Silva, so they replaced Silva with Matt Hamill.

On March 29, Kizer released the details surrounding the questions about Silva's UFC 125 drug test. He confirmed that the findings, after two different drug testing facilities analyzed his urine sample, were inconsistent with human urine. This suggests that Silva submitted either an altered or substituted specimen for the sample used in the drug test. The Nevada State Athletic Commission will discuss a temporary suspension at a hearing on April 7 as well as the possibility of ruling his most recent victory a no contest.

On March 30 Silva released a statement admitting using a urine adulterant.

I used a urine adulterant when giving a sample following my fight with Brandon Vera. I did so in an attempt to alter the results of the test and knowingly broke the rules of the Nevada (State) Athletic Commission. This was a terrible decision on my part for which I will be punished. I am prepared to accept this punishment, learn from it and move on. I apologize to the commission, the UFC, Brandon Vera and the MMA fans.

Silva said he doesn't want to make an excuse for his behavior, but he did hope to offer an explanation for his decisions.

"Please do not interpret this as an attempt to justify my actions. I know they were wrong, and I know I made bad decisions... I reinjured my back 45 days before the fight with Brandon Vera. After not fighting for a year, I made the decision to not pull out of the fight. I also decided that the only way I could continue with the fight was to take injections in my back and spine that contained substances prohibited by the Nevada (State) Athletic Commission. I also made the decision to use a product to hide the presence of these substances in a urine test."

After the hearing, the Nevada State Athletic Commission handed Silva a one-year suspension along with changing his previous win over Vera to a no contest, forfeiture of 25 percent of his purse, and $20,000 out of a $55,000 win bonus.

=== Return post-suspension ===
Silva had served his one-year suspension on January 1, 2012.

Silva was briefly linked to a rematch against Brandon Vera on May 15, 2012, at UFC on Fuel TV: Korean Zombie vs. Poirier. However, Vera was forced out of the bout with an injury and replaced by Igor Pokrajac. Silva, however, was pulled from this bout on March 6 when it was announced he would replace injured Antônio Rogério Nogueira against Alexander Gustafsson at UFC on Fuel TV 2. On April 14, Silva faced rising prospect Alexander Gustafsson in Gustafsson's hometown of Stockholm, Sweden. Gustafsson used his massive reach, and stayed in the outside and Silva couldn't find his distance, Gustafsson knocked Silva down with an uppercut early in the first round that also caused a relatively large cut on the forehead of the Brazilian. He lost the fight via unanimous decision (30–27, 30–27, and 29–28).

Silva was expected to face former UFC Light Heavyweight Champion and former Chute Boxe Academy fighter, Maurício Rua on July 21, 2012, at UFC 149. However, Silva was forced out of the bout with an injury.

Silva faced undefeated Bulgarian wrestler Stanislav Nedkov on November 10, 2012, at UFC on Fuel TV 6. Silva won the fight via an arm-triangle choke submission. His performance earned him his first "Submission of the Night" bonus. On November 21, 2012, it was announced that Silva had failed his post fight drug test, testing positive for marijuana metabolites. Silva was subsequently suspended for 6 months, retroactive to November 10, 2012. His win over Nedkov was changed to a No Contest.

Silva next faced debuting former Strikeforce Light Heavyweight Champion, Rafael Cavalcante on June 8, 2013, at UFC on Fuel TV 10. He won the fight via knockout in the first round. The fight also earned him his first "Knockout of the Night" and "Fight of the Night" bonus.

Silva faced Matt Hamill on October 9, 2013, at UFC Fight Night 29. He won the fight via unanimous decision (30–27, 30–27, and 29–27).

Silva was briefly linked to a bout with Ovince St. Preux on January 15, 2014, at UFC Fight Night 35. However, Silva was quickly removed from the bout for undisclosed reasons. The bout with St. Preux was rescheduled for March 15 at UFC 171. The bout was scrapped again on February 7 after Silva was released from his contract following his arrest the previous night.

==== Gym hold-up incident ====
On February 6, 2014, in Oakland Park, Florida, Silva allegedly threatened Pablo Popovitch at his Brazilian Jiu-Jitsu Center, and his estranged wife Thaysa Kamiji, who was in a relationship with Popovitch. The day before, Kamiji called police on Silva for violating a temporary protection order. He was charged with aggravated battery and non-violently resisting an officer; the charges were later lessened to aggravated assaults by a Broward County judge, who also deemed Silva a flight risk and denied him bond. Following the arrest, UFC President Dana White said Silva will "never fight in the UFC again". The UFC formally released him later that day.

On September 4, 2014, a Florida judge dropped all criminal charges against Silva.

The next day after the criminal charges were dropped on September 4, Silva was re-signed by the UFC. However, on September 19, citing "new video and audio evidence," the UFC released him.

=== Post-UFC career ===
In his first fight since his UFC release, Silva was expected to face Mike Hayes at Fight Time 20 on August 29, 2014. However, Silva sustained a knee injury and the bout was cancelled.

=== UFC return ===
On September 5, 2014, it was announced that Silva had re-signed with the promotion. However, his return was short lived, as on September 19, the UFC released a statement on their website announcing that Silva's contract had been terminated due to new audio and video evidence that had been received that day.

=== World Series of Fighting ===
On January 15, 2015, it was announced that Silva had signed with the WSOF promotion. He entered a four-man tournament for the light heavyweight title.

Silva was originally expected to face Ronny Markes in the semifinals of the tournament, on March 28, 2015, at WSOF 19. Silva's opponent was later changed from Markes to be a rematch against Matt Hamill. However, the day of the event Hamill fell ill and was replaced on short notice by Teddy Holder. A heavy favorite to win, Silva lost the fight via TKO in the first round.

=== Other Organizations ===
With his contract in WSOF which allows him to fight for other organizations, Silva fought Marcus Sursa in the Gladiator MMA organization, despite winning the first round of the fight he lost in the second round after a controversial stoppage, after those two losses he bounced back by winning in Russia against Stav Economou by a unanimous decision.

Silva got scheduled to fight the veteran Rameau Thierry Sokoudjou in Brazil for the Fight2night organization. After dropping Sokoudjou in the first round, he was able to TKO his opponent at the third round, securing his second consecutive victory.

=== Absolute Championship Berkut ===
Silva faced Jared Torgeson on January 13, 2017, at ACB 51. He won the fight by unanimous decision to become the Absolute Championship Berkut Light Heavyweight champion.

Silva faced Batraz Agnaev on July 23, 2017, to defend the Absolute Championship Berkut Light Heavyweight Belt. for the first time. However, he lost the fight via TKO in the second round.

Silva faced Daniel Toledo at ACB 74 on November 18, 2017. He won the fight via TKO in the second round.

Silva fought in ACB 82: São Paulo where he dropped to Middleweight for the first time in his career against Mikhail "Barrera" Kolobegov. He lost the fight by controversial split decision.

Silva was scheduled to face Chris Camozzi on June 16, 2018, at ACB 88 in Brisbane, Australia. However, the fight got canceled two days before the event due to Silva's visa complications.

=== KSW ===
Silva fought James McSweeney at KSW 45 at heavyweight on October 6, 2018, as McSweeney's original opponent Michał Andryszak pulled out of the fight citing an injury. Thiago won the fight by unanimous decision.

After a submission loss against Ivan Shtyrkov at Russian Cagefight Championship, Silva face Martin Zawada at KSW 49 on May 18, 2019. He lost the fight via unanimous decision and his opponent was awarded a "Performance of the Night" award.

=== Eagle Fighting Championship ===
After three years away from MMA competition, Silva returned to face Héctor Lombard on May 20, 2022, at Eagle FC 48. The bout ended in a No Contest in the second round after Silva dropped Lombard with a punch and then hit him with an accidental illegal knee that rendered him unable to continue.

== Kickboxing career ==
=== Glory ===
Silva made his debut for the Glory organisation on December 1, 2017, in the Theater at Madison Square Garden in New York at Glory 48 against John King, who is also an MMA fighter. He won the fight via unanimous decision.

== Championships and accomplishments ==
=== Mixed martial arts ===
- Absolute Championship Berkut
  - ACB Light Heavyweight Championship (One time)
- Ultimate Fighting Championship
  - Knockout of the Night (One time)
  - Fight of the Night (One time)
- Fury FC 2: Final Combat
  - 2006 Fury FC 2 GP Winner

=== Brazilian Jiu-Jitsu ===
- State and Brazilian BJJ Tournaments Winner
- Black Belt in Brazilian jiu-jitsu

== Mixed martial arts record ==
Professional record breakdown
33 matches	21 wins	9 losses
By knockout	15	4
By submission	1	1
By decision	5	4
No contests	3	

Res.	Record	Opponent	Method	Event	Date	Round	Time	Location	Notes
NC	21–9 (3)	Héctor Lombard	No Contest (illegal knee)	Eagle FC 47	May 20, 2022	2	1:44	Miami, Florida, United States	Return to Light Heavyweight.
Loss	21–9 (2)	Martin Zawada	Decision (unanimous)	KSW 49: Soldić vs. Kaszubowski	May 18, 2019	3	5:00	Gdańsk, Poland	Catchweight (209 lb) bout.
Loss	21–8 (2)	Ivan Shtyrkov	Submission (armbar)	Russian Cagefighting Championship 5	December 15, 2018	1	2:20	Ekaterinburg, Russia	
Win	21–7 (2)	James McSweeney	Decision (unanimous)	KSW 45: The Return to Wembley	October 6, 2018	3	5:00	Wembley, England	Heavyweight bout.
Loss	20–7 (2)	Mikhail Kolobegov	Decision (split)	ACB 82: Silva vs. Kolobegov	March 9, 2018	3	5:00	São Paulo, Brazil	Middleweight bout.
Win	20–6 (2)	Daniel Toledo	TKO (punches)	ACB 74: Aguev vs. Townsend	November 18, 2017	2	4:29	Vienna, Austria	
Loss	19–6 (2)	Batraz Agnaev	TKO (punches)	ACB 65: Silva vs. Agnaev	July 22, 2017	2	3:34	Sheffield, England	Lost the ACB Light Heavyweight Championship.
Win	19–5 (2)	Jared Torgeson	Decision (unanimous)	ACB 51: Silva vs. Torgeson	January 13, 2017	5	5:00	Irvine, California, United States	Won the Vacant ACB Light Heavyweight Championship.
Win	18–5 (2)	Rameau Thierry Sokoudjou	TKO (punches)	F2N: Fight2Night	November 4, 2016	3	2:37	Rio de Janeiro, Brazil	
Win	17–5 (2)	Stav Economou	Decision (unanimous)	WFCA 17: Grand Prix Akhmat	April 9, 2016	3	5:00	Grozny, Russia	Heavyweight bout.
Loss	16–5 (2)	Marcus Sursa	TKO (punches)	Gladiator MMA	November 21, 2015	2	2:00	St. Charles, Missouri, United States	
Loss	16–4 (2)	Teddy Holder	TKO (punches)	WSOF 19	March 28, 2015	1	2:00	Phoenix, Arizona, United States	WSOF Light Heavyweight Championship Tournament Semifinal.
Win	16–3 (2)	Matt Hamill	Decision (unanimous)	UFC Fight Night: Maia vs. Shields	October 9, 2013	3	5:00	Barueri, Brazil	Catchweight (208 lbs); Silva missed weight.
Win	15–3 (2)	Rafael Cavalcante	KO (punches)	UFC on Fuel TV: Nogueira vs. Werdum	June 8, 2013	1	4:29	Fortaleza, Brazil	Knockout of the Night. Fight of the Night.
NC	14–3 (2)	Stanislav Nedkov	NC (overturned)	UFC on Fuel TV: Franklin vs. Le	November 10, 2012	3	1:45	Macau, SAR, China	Originally submission (arm-triangle choke) win; Submission of the Night; result overturned after Silva failed drug test.
Loss	14–3 (1)	Alexander Gustafsson	Decision (unanimous)	UFC on Fuel TV: Gustafsson vs. Silva	April 14, 2012	3	5:00	Stockholm, Sweden	
NC	14–2 (1)	Brandon Vera	NC (overturned)	UFC 125	January 1, 2011	3	5:00	Las Vegas, Nevada, United States	Originally unanimous decision win; result overturned after Silva falsified his urine sample.
Loss	14–2	Rashad Evans	Decision (unanimous)	UFC 108: Evans vs. Silva	January 2, 2010	3	5:00	Las Vegas, Nevada, United States	
Win	14–1	Keith Jardine	KO (punches)	UFC 102: Couture vs. Nogueira	August 29, 2009	1	1:35	Portland, Oregon, United States	
Loss	13–1	Lyoto Machida	KO (punches)	UFC 94: St-Pierre vs. Penn 2	January 31, 2009	1	4:59	Las Vegas, Nevada, United States	
Win	13–0	Antonio Mendes	TKO (submission to punches)	UFC 84: Ill Will	May 24, 2008	1	2:24	Las Vegas, Nevada, United States	
Win	12–0	Houston Alexander	KO (punches)	UFC 78: Validation	November 17, 2007	1	3:25	Newark, New Jersey, United States	
Win	11–0	Tomasz Drwal	TKO (punches)	UFC 75: Champion vs. Champion	September 8, 2007	2	4:23	London, England	
Win	10–0	James Irvin	TKO (knee injury)	UFC 71: Liddell vs. Jackson	May 26, 2007	1	1:06	Las Vegas, Nevada, United States	
Win	9–0	Tatsuya Mizuno	KO (soccer kick)	Pancrase: Rising 2	February 28, 2007	1	4:29	Tokyo, Japan	
Win	8–0	Vitor Vianna	TKO (arm injury)	Fury FC 2: Final Combat	November 30, 2006	1	1:50	São Paulo, Brazil	Won the Fury FC 2 Grand Prix.
Win	7–0	Claudio Godoi	KO (punches)	Fury FC 2: Final Combat	November 30, 2006	1	2:06	São Paulo, Brazil	
Win	6–0	Dino Pezao	TKO (punches)	Show Fight 5	November 9, 2006	1	4:34	São Paulo, Brazil	
Win	5–0	Dave Dalgliesh	Submission (heel hook)	Fury Fighting Championship 1	September 27, 2006	1	1:05	São Paulo, Brazil	
Win	4–0	Claudio Godoi	Decision (unanimous)	Show Fight 4	April 6, 2006	3	5:00	São Paulo, Brazil	
Win	3–0	Rodrigo Gripp de Sousa	TKO (doctor stoppage)	Shooto: Brazil 9	December 3, 2005	2	1:14	São Paulo, Brazil	
Win	2–0	Flavio Polones	KO (punch)	Arena Combat Cup 2	November 5, 2005	1	3:39	São Paulo, Brazil	
Win	1–0	Rubens Xavier	TKO (head kick and punches)	Predador FC 1	September 10, 2005	2	4:17	São Paulo, Brazil	

== Kickboxing record ==
Professional kickboxing record
1 win (0 KOs), 0 loss, 0 draw
Date	Result	Opponent	Event	Location	Method	Round	Time	Record
2017-12-01	Win	(United States) John King	Glory 48: New York	New York City, New York	Decision (unanimous)	3	3:00	1–0

== See also ==
- List of male mixed martial artists
- List of male kickboxers
