= 2007 in Pride FC =

Mixed martial arts events

Information
- First date: February 24, 2007
- Last date: April 8, 2007

Events
- Total events: 2

Fights
- Total fights: 17
- Title fights: 1

Chronology
2006 in Pride	2007 in Pride FC

The year 2007 was the 11th and final year in the history of the Pride Fighting Championships, a mixed martial arts promotion based in Japan. 2007 had 2 events beginning with, Pride 33 - The Second Coming.

== Title fights ==
Title fights in 2007
Weight class				Method	Round	Time	Event	Notes
Middleweight	Dan Henderson	def.	Wanderlei Silva (c)	KO (punches)	3	2:08	Pride 33 - The Second Coming	(Note: For the Pride Middleweight Championship.)

== Debut Pride FC fighters ==
The following fighters fought their first Pride FC fight in 2007:

- Brian Lo-A-Njoe
- Edson Drago
- James Lee
- Jason Ireland
- Jeff Monson
- Mac Danzig
- Mike Russow
- Nick Diaz
- Rameau Thierry Sokoudjou
- Travis Wiuff
- Zelg Galesic
- Zuluzinho

== Events list ==
#	Event	Japanese name	Date held	Venue	City	Attendance
68	Pride 34 - Kamikaze	—N/a	April 8, 2007	Saitama Super Arena	Saitama, Japan	—N/a
67	Pride 33 - The Second Coming	—N/a	February 24, 2007	Thomas & Mack Center	Las Vegas, Nevada, United States	12,911

== See also ==
- Pride Fighting Championships
- List of Pride Fighting Championships champions
- List of Pride Fighting events
