= Pride 34 =

Pride FC MMA event in 2007

- The poster for Pride 34
- Promotion: Pride Fighting Championships
- Date: April 8, 2007
- Venue: Saitama Super Arena
- City: Saitama, Japan

Event chronology
Pride 33	Pride 34

Pride 34: Kamikaze was a mixed martial arts event held by Pride Fighting Championships on April 8, 2007, at the Saitama Super Arena in Saitama, Japan.

== Background ==
This was the last Pride show promoted by Dream Stage Entertainment before the sale of the company (see Pride Worldwide). The promotion folded shortly after the event.

Although Wanderlei Silva and Mauricio Rua were negotiating with Pride to compete, neither did. Silva did not participate because of a medical suspension received from the Nevada State Athletic Commission. The commission had stated that if a Japanese doctor cleared Silva for competition, they would consider lifting the suspension three days early, but this did not come to fruition.

Gilbert Yvel was originally slated to fight Bazigit Atajev, but Atajev withdrew due to an internal disease.

Nobuyuki Sakakibara's "surprise announcement" at the event turned out to be a guest appearance by Kazushi Sakuraba who had left Pride nearly a year ago to join rival promotion Hero's. Kiyoshi Tamura joined Sakuraba in the ring and teased a potential matchup in a future Pride event. Sakuraba had initially expressed his wish to fight either Wanderlei Silva or Kiyoshi Tamura on the card but in the end neither fight materialized. Though Tamura would end up fighting Sakuraba at Dynamite!! 2008.

== Results ==
Card
Weight class				Method	Round	Time	Notes
Heavyweight	Yoshihiro Nakao	def.	Edson Drago	Submission (scarf hold)	1	9:15
Heavyweight	Eric Esch	def.	Zuluzinho	Submission (keylock)	1	2:35
Middleweight	Makoto Takimoto	def.	Zelg Galesic	Submission (kimura)	1	5:40
Heavyweight	Gilbert Yvel	def.	Akira Shoji	TKO (punches)	1	3:46
Heavyweight	James Thompson	def.	Don Frye	TKO (punches)	1	6:23
Lightweight	Shinya Aoki	def.	Brian Lo-A-Njoe	Submission (armbar)	1	1:33
Heavyweight	Rameau Thierry Sokoudjou	def.	Ricardo Arona	KO (punches)	1	1:59
Heavyweight	Jeff Monson	def.	Kazuyuki Fujita	Submission (rear-naked choke)	1	6:36

== See also ==
- Pride FC
- List of Pride FC champions
- List of Pride FC events
- 2007 in Pride FC
