= Rampage Jackson =

American actor, professional wrestler, and mixed martial artist (born 1978)

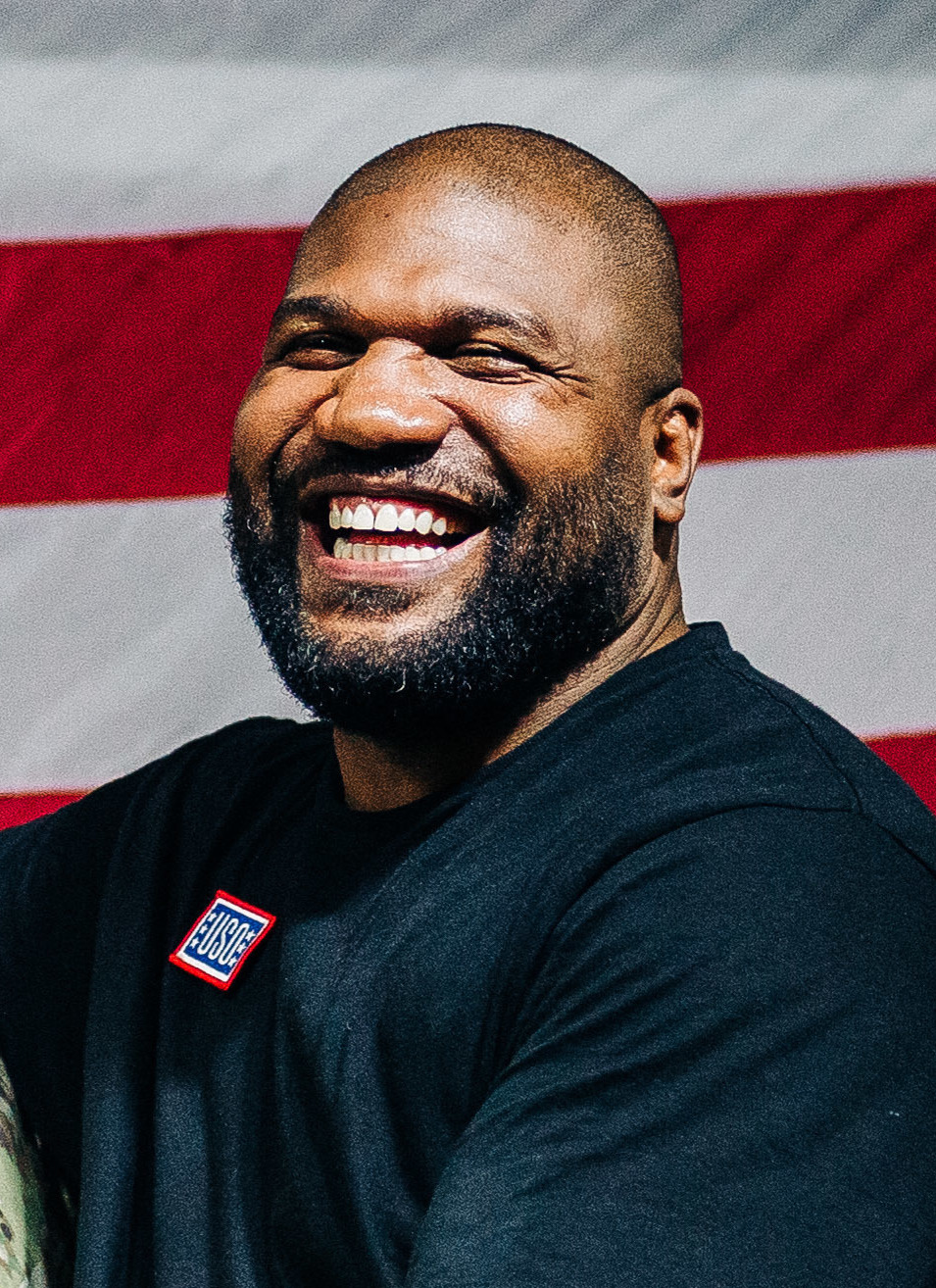
- Jackson in 2019
- Born: Quinton Ramone Jackson; June 20, 1978 (age 48); Memphis, Tennessee, U.S.
- Other names: Rampage
- Height: 6 ft 1 in (185 cm)
- Weight: 265 lb (120 kg; 18 st 13 lb)
- Division: Middleweight (2003); Light Heavyweight (2000–2002, 2004–2014); Heavyweight (1999–2000, 2015–present)
- Reach: 73 in (185 cm)
- Fighting out of: Irvine, California, U.S.
- Team: Team Oyama; Team Punishment; Wolfslair MMA Academy; Rampage Fitness Academy Team
- Trainer: Lance Gibson, Bobby Rimmer
- Rank: Black belt in Brazilian jiu-jitsu under Allan Góes
- Wrestling: NJCAA wrestling
- Years active: 1999–2019

Kickboxing record
- Total: 3
- Wins: 3
- By knockout: 1

Mixed martial arts record
- Total: 52
- Wins: 38
- By knockout: 20
- By submission: 4
- By decision: 14
- Losses: 14
- By knockout: 4
- By submission: 2
- By decision: 7
- By disqualification: 1

Other information
- Notable school: Raleigh-Egypt High School
- Website: rampagejackson.com
- Mixed martial arts record from Sherdog

YouTube information
- Channel: Rampage Jackson
- Subscribers: 62 thousand
- Views: 11 million

Kick information
- Channel: RampageJackson
- Years active: 2025–present
- Followers: 208 thousand
- Last updated: February 14, 2026

Quinton Ramone Jackson (born June 20, 1978) is an American online streamer and former mixed martial artist, actor, kickboxer, and professional wrestler known by his ring name of Rampage Jackson. During the course of his mixed martial arts (MMA) career, Jackson won the UFC Light Heavyweight Championship, the Bellator Season 10 Light Heavyweight Tournament Championship, and unified the UFC Light Heavyweight Championship with the Pride FC World Middleweight Championship belt. Due to his eccentric personality and aggressive fighting style, Jackson became a star in Japan during his tenure with Pride FC and following his move to the UFC, he helped pioneer MMA's growth into a worldwide sport.

== Background ==
Jackson is from Memphis, Tennessee, and had a difficult childhood. He began selling drugs from a young age and was involved in many street fights. His drug-addicted father disappeared when Jackson was only 10 years old, before returning to his life in 2003. Jackson had his first experience with combat sports as a wrestler for Raleigh-Egypt High School, enrolling at the school as a 17-year-old freshman, where his career included All-State honors in his senior year after wrestling for fifth in the state tournament at 189 pounds (86 kg). In high school, Jackson also befriended fellow Bellator light heavyweight Jacob Noe, a karate practitioner who taught Jackson striking techniques, in exchange for wrestling techniques. Originally, Jackson intended to pursue a career in professional wrestling after graduating high school, but ultimately extended his amateur wrestling career at Lassen Community College in Susanville, California, before being expelled after a fight with a teammate. After discovering mixed martial arts, Jackson trained in Las Vegas with BAMMA fighter Lewis Rumble.

== Martial arts career ==
=== Early career ===
Impressed by the success of other wrestlers in MMA, Jackson decided to try his own hand at the sport. Jackson built up a record of 10 wins and 1 loss fighting for a variety of smaller scale American promotions, including King of the Cage, Gladiator Challenge and Dangerzone. Jackson gained a reputation for lifting his opponents and slamming them to the mat. Jackson's successful first MMA Title shot against Rocko Hammerhands Henderson proved to be the beginning of many upsets.

=== Pride Fighting Championships ===
In 2001, Japan's Pride organization marketed Jackson as a homeless person. Jackson, still a relatively unknown fighter, first was matched at Pride 15 against fellow wrestler and Japanese superstar Kazushi Sakuraba, who was at that time considered one of Pride's most prominent domestic fighters. Jackson lost due to a rear naked choke from Sakuraba.

After beating pro-wrestler Alexander Otsuka in a fight for the Battlarts promotion, Jackson was invited back for Pride 17 where he scored a knockout victory over Otsuka's training partner, Yuki Ishikawa. In his next fight, Jackson was disqualified for a low blow against Daijiro Matsui.

Jackson went on to defeat Masaaki Satake, Igor Vovchanchyn, Kevin Randleman and Mikhail Illoukhine in successive Pride bouts. He also made forays into kickboxing with a pair of victories over kickboxer Cyril Abidi, under K-1 rules. The first kickboxing bout between Abidi and Jackson was on July 14, 2002. Jackson knocked down Abidi less than a minute into the bout. Jackson then scored a hard underhand right to the chin of Abidi, knocking him out at 1:55 in the first round.

Later in the year, Abidi wanted to prove that his loss to Jackson was a fluke, and faced him on the New Year's Eve Inoki Bom-Ba-Ye card, again under K-1 rules. Jackson once again defeated Abidi. It would be Jackson's last kickboxing bout, as he returned to full-time MMA competition afterwards.

==== Rivalry with Wanderlei Silva ====
Around this time, Jackson began stating his intentions to capture the Pride Middleweight (205 lb/93 kg) title from Wanderlei Silva. In the opening round of Pride's 2003 Middleweight Grand Prix, Jackson won a split decision over Murilo Bustamante. Three months later, Jackson defeated UFC fighter Chuck Liddell in the tournament's semi-finals at Pride Final Conflict 2003 by corner stoppage, putting him in place to battle Silva in the tournament finals that night. After taking Wanderlei Silva down and bloodying him, a stand-up was called by the referee and Jackson was stopped with a series of heavy knees to the head, leading to a referee stoppage.

Jackson continued his Pride career with a TKO victory over Ikuhisa Minowa at Pride Shockwave 2003. He then faced Ricardo Arona at Pride Critical Countdown 2004 with the winner to face Wanderlei Silva. Late in the first round Arona caught Jackson in a triangle choke, Jackson picked up Arona and powerbombed him into the canvas, earning the KO win.

Prior to his rematch with Silva, Jackson made headlines with the public announcement of his conversion to Christianity. In the fight itself, Jackson floored Silva in the opening round and later scored a takedown which led to a series of knees and elbows at the end of the round. Jackson scored another takedown in the second round, but Silva escaped to his feet and proceeded to knock out Jackson with multiple knee strikes to the head.

==== Final bouts with Pride ====
Jackson's next two bouts were against Silva's Chute Boxe training camp partners. He won a split decision over Murilo "Ninja" Rua, but fell to Rua's younger brother, Shogun Rua, via TKO soccer kicks to the head

Soon after his loss to Shogun, Jackson was contacted by veteran boxing and MMA trainer Juanito Ibarra, who saw potential in Jackson's natural abilities but viewed his reputation as a hindrance. After a short conversation, Jackson entrusted Ibarra, a fellow born again Christian, with the managerial and training direction of his career.

Jackson then defeated Hirotaka Yokoi via TKO at Pride 30. In his final fight for Pride he won a unanimous decision over Yoon Dong-Sik at Pride 31

=== After Pride ===
On May 16, 2006, the World Fighting Alliance announced it had signed Jackson to a multi-fight deal. He defeated Matt Lindland by split decision at WFA: King of the Streets on July 22, 2006. "He is a good fighter", Jackson said. "I trained hard. He is an Olympic silver medalist. So much respect to him. I knew I had to bring it." He was caught in guillotine choke holds twice. Jackson managed to get out both times, and slammed Lindland a few times before cutting the bridge of his nose with ground and pound on his way to the win.

=== Ultimate Fighting Championship ===
On December 11, 2006, Zuffa, the parent company of the UFC, announced it had acquired select assets from the World Fighting Alliance, which ceased operations as part of their sales agreement. Jackson's WFA contract was one of the assets acquired.

In an interview on the UFC program Inside the UFC, Jackson said it was finally time for him to enter the organization, and that he had not before because of his friendship with UFC fighter Tito Ortiz. Jackson said that because Ortiz was one of the biggest stars in the UFC, and that both were fighters in the same weight class, he did not want to interfere.

Jackson made his UFC debut at UFC 67, where he knocked out Marvin Eastman, avenging an early career loss.

==== Winning the Light Heavyweight Championship ====
At UFC 71 on May 26, 2007, Jackson faced UFC Light Heavyweight Champion Chuck Liddell in a title rematch of their 2003 Pride bout. Approximately 90 seconds into the first round, Jackson caught Liddell with a right hook to the jaw that sent him down to the mat, where Jackson landed a few more clean shots on the ground before a referee stoppage at 1:53 seconds to capture the UFC Light Heavyweight title.

Jackson then defeated Pride Middleweight Champion Dan Henderson at UFC 75, on September 8, 2007, in London, England via unanimous decision to unify the two organizations' titles.

==== The Ultimate Fighter 7 ====
On December 9, 2007, it was announced by Dana White at Spike TV's Video Game Awards show that Jackson will be one of the two coaches of The Ultimate Fighter 7. At the conclusion of the season, Jackson fought the other coach and number one contender Forrest Griffin at UFC 86. During the show, Jackson showed his temper after his fighters repeatedly lost to Team Forrest. Going into the semifinals, only two of Jackson's original fighters made the cut while Griffin had 6 of his fighters advance. In the finale, Team Forrest's pick, Amir Sadollah beat Team Rampage's top fighter C.B. Dollaway via armbar in the first round.

On July 5, 2008, he fought Griffin for the light heavyweight championship at UFC 86 and lost a judges' decision. In the first round of the fight Jackson delivered two solid power punches, and soon after knocked Griffin down. Jackson tagged him throughout the fight. In contrast, Griffin pushed the pace of the fight from start to finish and stayed much more aggressive than Jackson for most of the fight with multiple leg kicks and by mounting Quinton and landing elbows and punches to his head. In later rounds Jackson managed to take Griffin down twice and work his own ground game, almost executing his signature power bomb. Many took note as Jackson was showing obvious discomfort from the effects of the leg kicks. The next three rounds were described by Sherdog as "somewhat uneventful" with Jackson searching for the knockout punch while Griffin threw whatever he could with long jabs, leg and body kicks. Griffin was awarded a unanimous decision.

After the fight both Griffin and his coach Randy Couture expressed that they thought the fight was close, and Jackson's coach, Juanito Ibarra, had planned to protest the unanimous decision with the Nevada State Athletic Commission. However, after speaking with the commission about his complaint, he decided not to file because he was informed that even if the judges scores were changed to his satisfaction, the fight would still result in a victory for Griffin by a majority decision. Soon after the fight, Jackson fired his longtime trainer/manager Ibarra. There were talks of an immediate rematch after the fight.

Following the loss of his belt, Quinton was involved in a hit and run incident and a high speed police pursuit in Newport Beach, California, charges followed to which he would plead guilty.

==== Back to title contention ====
Jackson began training for his next fight at UFC 92, which would be against Wanderlei Silva, the only man to defeat Jackson twice. Jackson avenged his previous defeats by knocking Silva out with a vicious left hook in the first round. The fight was notable for some controversy surrounding the conclusion of the match, as Jackson followed Silva to the ground with another three punches before referee Yves Lavigne called the fight. Yves was unsuccessful at protecting Silva from the second and third punches.

Jackson's next fight was against Keith Jardine at UFC 96 on March 7, 2009. It was announced before the fight that if Jackson won he would fight Rashad Evans for the Light Heavyweight Championship and if he lost Lyoto Machida would fight for the title instead. Jackson then won the fight by unanimous decision. Jackson was on track to get his title shot but lingering injuries kept him from fighting. Lyoto Machida received the title shot and Evans was expected to defend his belt as the main event instead; Jackson had stated he would like to fight Rashad, however, he suffered torn ligaments in his jaw that will require surgery and five weeks of no contact. Therefore, Lyoto Machida replaced Jackson, and Jackson was expected to fight the winner of the Machida vs. Evans bout, though that fight never came to fruition.

==== The Ultimate Fighter: Heavyweights ====
Production of the tenth series of The Ultimate Fighter reality series began in June 2009 with Jackson coaching opposite former UFC Light Heavyweight Champion Rashad Evans. The season, featuring 16 heavyweight competitors including internet street fighter Kevin "Kimbo Slice" Ferguson, the former IFL Heavyweight Champion Roy "Big Country" Nelson and former NFL players, made its premiere on Spike TV on September 16 with the finale scheduled for December 5.

==== Retirement and return ====
On September 22, 2009, Jackson wrote in a blog on his website that he was "done fighting", due to maltreatment by the UFC. On December 4, 2009, Jackson informed the community via his web blog that he would return to the UFC to finish his contract and wanted to fight Rashad Evans. At the UFC 107 press conference, Dana White stated that if Rashad Evans could defeat Thiago Silva at UFC 108, then a fight between Evans and Jackson would finally come to fruition.

Jackson was expected to finally face Rashad Evans at UFC 113, but the bout was scheduled for May 29, 2010, at UFC 114. UFC President Dana White had officially confirmed that the fight against Rashad Evans would determine who would challenge Maurício Rua in his first UFC Light Heavyweight Championship defense. Jackson ended up losing to Rashad Evans via unanimous decision. Jackson was tagged in the opening moments and spent the next two rounds being taken down before hurting Evans in the third, but was unable to finish him.

==== Return to title contention ====
On March 24, 2010, Dana White announced that Jackson signed a new six fight contract with the UFC. Jackson's next fight was against former UFC light heavyweight champion Lyoto Machida at UFC 123 on November 20, 2010. At UFC 123, Jackson met Machida in the main event. Jackson went on to win by a controversial split decision. UFC president Dana White put all doubts to rest and supported the judges' decision, saying that Jackson won the first two rounds and no rematch would be needed.

Jackson was expected to face Thiago Silva on May 28, 2011, at UFC 130. However, Silva tested positive for banned substances in his UFC 125 post fight drug test and was replaced by Matt Hamill. Jackson put on a dominant display, easily defending the decorated wrestler's takedowns and winning the striking exchanges. He won the fight via unanimous decision.

==== Second title shot ====
Jackson faced Jon Jones for the UFC Light Heavyweight Championship on September 24, 2011, at UFC 135. Jackson lost by submission in the fourth round after Jones applied a rear-naked choke. The loss marks the first time Jackson had been finished during his run in the UFC.

==== Post-title shot ====
Jackson faced Ryan Bader on February 26, 2012, at UFC 144. Jackson missed the light heavyweight weight allowance of 206 lbs by 5 lbs; weighing in at 211 lbs for UFC 144. He cited a training injury that prevented him from doing road work. Bader accepted the fight at catchweight and received 20% of Jackson's purse. Jackson lost the fight via unanimous decision; it was the first time he had suffered two consecutive losses. Following the match Jackson tweeted that he was leaving the UFC after his loss to Bader. He was planning to face former Pride rival, Shogun Rua as his last UFC fight, but opted to have double knee surgery.

Jackson was expected to face Glover Teixeira on October 13, 2012, at UFC 153. However, Jackson pulled out of the bout citing an injury and was replaced by Fábio Maldonado.

Jackson fought Teixeira and lost by unanimous decision on January 26, 2013, at UFC on Fox 6.

=== Bellator MMA ===
On June 4, 2013, it was announced Jackson had signed multi-year deal with the partnership of Spike TV, Bellator MMA and Total Nonstop Action Wrestling. During a press conference he stated that he might move up to the heavyweight division.

Jackson was expected to face former training partner and fellow former UFC Light Heavyweight Champion Tito Ortiz on November 2 at Bellator 106. However, on October 25, Bellator announced Ortiz suffered a neck injury and had to pull out of his fight with Jackson.

Jackson made his Bellator debut on November 15, 2013, at Bellator 108 where he faced Joey Beltran. He won via knockout in round 1 after dropping Beltran with a left-right hook combination and following up with another right hand on the ground, stopping the action with 1 second left in the round.

Jackson next faced former Bellator Champion Christian M'Pumbu on February 28, 2014, in the Season 10 Light Heavyweight Tournament at Bellator 110 in the semifinals. He won via knockout in the first round.

Jackson faced Muhammed Lawal in the tournament final for a title shot on May 17, 2014, at Bellator 120. He won the fight via unanimous decision. After the fight Mississippi Athletic Commission fined Jackson $10,000 due to his shove at Lawal during the pre-fight weigh-in staredown. According to head of MAC Jon Lewis, he was about to pull Jackson out of the fight for insulting him due to the issued fine.

=== Return to the UFC ===
On December 20, 2014, during the main card broadcast of UFC Fight Night: Machida vs. Dollaway, it was announced that Jackson had signed a new deal to return to the UFC. Scott Coker, Bellator's president, alleged that Jackson was still under contract with Bellator and they would pursue legal process to ensure that. Jackson claimed that Bellator did not honor his contract and that's the reason he signed with the UFC.

Jackson was scheduled to face Fábio Maldonado on April 25, 2015, at UFC 186. However, on April 7, Jackson was removed from the card after his most recent employer Bellator MMA was granted an injunction by a New Jersey Superior Court judge preventing him from competing for the UFC after it was alleged that he breached a deal signed in June 2013. On April 21, a judge in the Superior Court of New Jersey's Appellate Division overturned the injunction against Jackson, allowing him to compete for the UFC. The bout took place at a catchweight of 215 lbs. Jackson won the fight by unanimous decision.

=== Return to Bellator MMA ===
Following his lone fight for Zuffa, it was announced on February 16, 2016, that Jackson had settled the contractual disputes with Bellator MMA and would be returning to the promotion. During this time at Bellator, Jackson brought on the expertise of celebrity sports nutritionist Edwina Cheer to advise him on all aspects of nutrition on fight preparation and leading up to, and including, the weight cut. Known for his particular eating habits, Jackson thanked Cheer, stating "I know I'm hard to deal with".

Jackson fought Satoshi Ishii on June 24, 2016, at Bellator 157. He won via split decision.

Jackson faced Muhammed Lawal at Bellator 175 on March 31, 2017. The fight was a rematch from their first fight at Bellator's inaugural pay-per-view, Bellator 120, which Jackson won via decision. He lost the fight via unanimous decision.

On November 9, 2017, Jackson re-signed a multi-fight contract with Bellator.

Jackson faced Chael Sonnen in the quarterfinals of the Bellator Heavyweight World Grand Prix Tournament on January 20, 2018, at Bellator 192. He lost the fight via unanimous decision.

On June 25, 2018, it was announced that Jackson would fight Wanderlei Silva in a rematch on September 29 at Bellator 206. He won the fight via technical knockout in round two.

On October 9, 2019, Bellator MMA announced that Jackson would face Fedor Emelianenko on December 29, 2019, at a Bellator and Rizin co-produced event in Japan. Jackson lost the bout via first round knockout. The bout marked the last fight of his contract with Bellator, who opted not to re-sign Jackson, making him a free agent.

=== Fight Circus ===
On April 2, 2023, Jackson competed in the main event of Fight Circus 6: The Rise or Fall of Sloppy Balboa of the Thailand-based promotion Fight Circus in a two-on-two boxing match, teaming up with Bob Sapp against the promotion's CEO, Jon Nutt and Bangtao Muay Thai’s strength and conditioning coach Andrew Wood. Sapp and Jackson were tied together wearing an oversized T-shirt. In the first round, Nutt was dropped by a heavy body shot and dragged his teammate down with him. Jackson and Sapp won by third-round KO. In 2024, Jackson appeared on The Joe Rogan Experience MMA Show #159 and described his match at Fight Circus to Joe Rogan as the "most fun he's ever had in a ring".

=== Shannon Briggs and Rashad Evans boxing matches ===
On January 31, 2024, Jackson announced that he had signed a contract to box former WBO heavyweight champion Shannon Briggs. The boxing match against Briggs was planned to occur on June 1 in Qatar; the bout ultimately did not materialize.

Jackson was scheduled to face Rashad Evans in a boxing bout on April 12, 2025 at ICS Mania 1. This was cancelled due to unfulfilled contractual obligations.

== Professional wrestling career ==
=== World Wrestling Entertainment (2010) ===
Jackson appeared on an episode of WWE Raw on June 7, 2010. He was a special guest host alongside co-stars Bradley Cooper and Sharlto Copley to promote The A-Team.

=== Total Nonstop Action Wrestling (2013–2014) ===
Jackson made his TNA debut on the June 6, 2013, episode of Impact Wrestling, getting into a verbal confrontation with Kurt Angle. The following week, Jackson saved Angle from an attack from the villainous Aces & Eights stable. Jackson returned on the July 11 episode of Impact Wrestling, being revealed as the fifth member of New Main Event Mafia along with Angle, Magnus, Samoa Joe, and Sting. On July 18, during the Destination X episode of Impact Wrestling, the Main Event Mafia achieved their goal of getting the TNA World Heavyweight Championship off of Bully Ray and out of Aces & Eights' hands after stopping them from interfering in Ray's match with Chris Sabin. After Angle took a leave of absence in August, Jackson attempted to recruit his Bellator 106 opponent Tito Ortiz to sub for him. Ortiz later attacked Jackson by hitting him in the head with a hammer, which helped Bully Ray regain the World Heavyweight Championship and go on to join Aces & Eights. Jackson made his in-ring debut in a five-on-five tag team match on the August 22 episode of Impact Wrestling; The Main Event Mafia (Jackson, Magnus, Joe, and Sting) and A.J. Styles defeated Aces & Eights after Styles pinned Devon for the win, forcing him out of TNA in the process. On September 12 at No Surrender, it was announced that Bellator MMA had pulled Jackson from TNA programming due to his upcoming PPV fight with Ortiz, thus removing him from the Main Event Mafia.

On July 31, 2014, in an interview with The Fight Nerd, Jackson stated that he was done with TNA after he saw their operations and how "they ran things". TNA has since moved his profile to the alumni section on their website, confirming his departure from the company.

=== Japan (2024) ===
On June 22, 2024, Jackson wrestled on the Bloodsport Bushido event organized by Josh Barnett in Tokyo, Japan. At the event, Jackson defeated Hideki Sekine by knockout.

== Championships and accomplishments ==
- Bellator MMA
  - Bellator Season 10 Light Heavyweight Tournament Championship
- Pride Fighting Championships
  - 2003 Pride Middleweight Grand Prix (Runner-up)
- Ultimate Fighting Championship
  - UFC Light Heavyweight Championship (One time)
    - One successful title defense
    - Unified the UFC Light Heavyweight and Pride World Middleweight Championships
  - Fight of the Night (Three times) vs. Forrest Griffin, Keith Jardine, Jon Jones
  - Knockout of the Night (Two times) vs. Chuck Liddell, Wanderlei Silva
  - Tied (Chuck Liddell, Josh Emmett, Cody Garbrandt, Montel Jackson & Ilia Topuria) for most consecutive fights with a knockdown landed in UFC history (7)
  - UFC.com Awards
    - 2007: Fighter of the Year, Ranked #2 Knockout of the Year vs. Chuck Liddell & Ranked #6 Upset of the Year vs. Chuck Liddell
    - 2008: Fight of the Yearvs. Forrest Griffin & Ranked #5 Knockout of the Year vs. Wanderlei Silva
- King of the Cage
  - KOTC Light Heavyweight Superfight Championship (One time)
- Wrestling Observer Newsletter awards
  - 2004 Fight of the Year vs. Wanderlei Silva on October 31
  - 2008 Fight of the Year vs. Forrest Griffin on July 5
  - 2007 Most Outstanding Fighter
- Sherdog
  - 2007 Fighter of the Year
  - Mixed Martial Arts Hall of Fame
- Yahoo Sports
  - 2007 Fighter of the Year
- MMA Fighting
  - 2004 Fight of the Year vs. Wanderlei Silva 2 at Pride 28
  - 2008 #2 Ranked UFC Knockout of the Year vs. Wanderlei Silva 3 at UFC 92
- Rear Naked News
  - 2008 Knockout of the Year vs. Wanderlei Silva 3 at UFC 92

== Mixed martial arts record ==
Professional record breakdown
52 matches	38 wins	14 losses
By knockout	20	4
By submission	4	2
By decision	14	7
By disqualification	0	1

Res.	Record	Opponent	Method	Event	Date	Round	Time	Location	Notes
Loss	38–14	Fedor Emelianenko	TKO (punches)	Bellator 237	December 29, 2019	1	2:44	Saitama, Japan	
Win	38–13	Wanderlei Silva	TKO (punches)	Bellator 206	September 29, 2018	2	4:32	San Jose, California, United States	
Loss	37–13	Chael Sonnen	Decision (unanimous)	Bellator 192	January 20, 2018	3	5:00	Inglewood, California, United States	Bellator Heavyweight World Grand Prix Quarterfinal.
Loss	37–12	Muhammed Lawal	Decision (unanimous)	Bellator 175	March 31, 2017	3	5:00	Rosemont, Illinois, United States	
Win	37–11	Satoshi Ishii	Decision (split)	Bellator 157: Dynamite 2	June 24, 2016	3	5:00	St. Louis, Missouri, United States	Return to Heavyweight.
Win	36–11	Fábio Maldonado	Decision (unanimous)	UFC 186	April 25, 2015	3	5:00	Montreal, Quebec, Canada	Catchweight (215 lbs) bout.
Win	35–11	Muhammed Lawal	Decision (unanimous)	Bellator 120	May 17, 2014	3	5:00	Southaven, Mississippi, United States	Won the Bellator Season 10 Light Heavyweight Tournament.
Win	34–11	Christian M'Pumbu	KO (punches)	Bellator 110	February 28, 2014	1	4:34	Uncasville, Connecticut, United States	Bellator Season 10 Light Heavyweight Tournament Semifinal.
Win	33–11	Joey Beltran	TKO (punches)	Bellator 108	November 15, 2013	1	4:59	Atlantic City, New Jersey, United States	Catchweight (210 lbs) bout.
Loss	32–11	Glover Teixeira	Decision (unanimous)	UFC on Fox: Johnson vs. Dodson	January 26, 2013	3	5:00	Chicago, Illinois, United States	
Loss	32–10	Ryan Bader	Decision (unanimous)	UFC 144	February 26, 2012	3	5:00	Saitama, Japan	Catchweight (211 lbs) bout; Jackson missed weight.
Loss	32–9	Jon Jones	Submission (rear-naked choke)	UFC 135	September 24, 2011	4	1:14	Denver, Colorado, United States	For the UFC Light Heavyweight Championship. Fight of the Night.
Win	32–8	Matt Hamill	Decision (unanimous)	UFC 130	May 28, 2011	3	5:00	Las Vegas, Nevada, United States	
Win	31–8	Lyoto Machida	Decision (split)	UFC 123	November 20, 2010	3	5:00	Auburn Hills, Michigan, United States	
Loss	30–8	Rashad Evans	Decision (unanimous)	UFC 114	May 29, 2010	3	5:00	Las Vegas, Nevada, United States	
Win	30–7	Keith Jardine	Decision (unanimous)	UFC 96	March 7, 2009	3	5:00	Columbus, Ohio, United States	Fight of the Night.
Win	29–7	Wanderlei Silva	KO (punch)	UFC 92	December 27, 2008	1	3:21	Las Vegas, Nevada, United States	Knockout of the Night.
Loss	28–7	Forrest Griffin	Decision (unanimous)	UFC 86	July 5, 2008	5	5:00	Las Vegas, Nevada, United States	Lost the UFC Light Heavyweight Championship. Fight of the Night.
Win	28–6	Dan Henderson	Decision (unanimous)	UFC 75	September 8, 2007	5	5:00	London, England	Defended the UFC Light Heavyweight Championship; Unified with the Pride Middleweight Championship.
Win	27–6	Chuck Liddell	KO (punches)	UFC 71	May 26, 2007	1	1:53	Las Vegas, Nevada, United States	Won the UFC Light Heavyweight Championship. Knockout of the Night.
Win	26–6	Marvin Eastman	KO (punches)	UFC 67	February 3, 2007	2	3:49	Las Vegas, Nevada, United States	
Win	25–6	Matt Lindland	Decision (split)	WFA: King of the Streets	July 22, 2006	3	5:00	Los Angeles, California, United States	
Win	24–6	Yoon Dong-sik	Decision (unanimous)	Pride 31 – Dreamers	February 26, 2006	3	5:00	Saitama, Japan	
Win	23–6	Hirotaka Yokoi	TKO (punches and stomps)	Pride 30	October 23, 2005	1	4:05	Saitama, Japan	
Loss	22–6	Maurício Rua	TKO (soccer kicks)	Pride Total Elimination 2005	April 23, 2005	1	4:47	Osaka, Japan	2005 Pride Middleweight Grand Prix Opening Round.
Win	22–5	Murilo Rua	Decision (split)	Pride 29	February 20, 2005	3	5:00	Saitama, Japan	
Loss	21–5	Wanderlei Silva	KO (knees)	Pride 28	October 31, 2004	2	3:26	Saitama, Japan	For the Pride Middleweight Championship.
Win	21–4	Ricardo Arona	KO (slam)	Pride Critical Countdown 2004	June 20, 2004	1	7:32	Saitama, Japan	
Win	20–4	Ikuhisa Minowa	TKO (punches)	Pride Shockwave 2003	December 31, 2003	2	1:05	Saitama, Japan	
Loss	19–4	Wanderlei Silva	TKO (knees)	Pride Final Conflict 2003	November 9, 2003	1	6:28	Tokyo, Japan	2003 Pride Middleweight Grand Prix Final.
Win	19–3	Chuck Liddell	TKO (corner stoppage)	Pride Final Conflict 2003	November 9, 2003	2	3:10	Tokyo, Japan	2003 Pride Middleweight Grand Prix Semifinal.
Win	18–3	Murilo Bustamante	Decision (split)	Pride Total Elimination 2003	August 10, 2003	3	5:00	Saitama, Japan	2003 Pride Middleweight Grand Prix Quarterfinal.
Win	17–3	Mikhail Ilyukhin	TKO (submission to knee to the body)	Pride 26	June 8, 2003	1	6:26	Yokohama, Japan	
Win	16–3	Kevin Randleman	KO (knee and punches)	Pride 25	March 16, 2003	1	6:58	Yokohama, Japan	
Win	15–3	Igor Vovchanchyn	TKO (injury)	Pride 22	September 29, 2002	1	7:17	Nagoya, Japan	
Win	14–3	Sean Gray	TKO (punches)	KOTC 13 – Revolution	May 17, 2002	3	0:37	Reno, Nevada, United States	
Win	13–3	Masaaki Satake	TKO (slam)	Pride 20	April 28, 2002	1	7:07	Yokohama, Japan	
Loss	12–3	Daijiro Matsui	DQ (knee to groin)	Pride 18	December 23, 2001	1	0:14	Fukuoka, Japan	
Win	12–2	Yuki Ishikawa	KO (punches)	Pride 17	November 3, 2001	1	1:52	Tokyo, Japan	
Win	11–2	Alexander Otsuka	TKO (doctor stoppage)	BattlArts: BattlArts vs. the World	October 14, 2001	2	5:00	Tokyo, Japan	
Loss	10–2	Kazushi Sakuraba	Submission (rear-naked choke)	Pride 15	July 29, 2001	1	5:41	Saitama, Japan	
Win	10–1	Kenneth Williams	Submission (rear-naked choke)	Gladiator Challenge 4	June 17, 2001	1	4:40	Colusa, California, United States	
Win	9–1	Bryson Haubrick	TKO (submission to punches)	KOTC 8 – Bombs Away	April 29, 2001	1	1:48	Williams, California, United States	Won the KOTC Light Heavyweight Superfight Championship.
Win	8–1	Dennis Henderson	Submission (kimura)	Gladiator Challenge 3	April 7, 2001	2	1:15	Friant, California, United States	
Win	7–1	Dave Taylor	TKO (corner stoppage)	Gladiator Challenge 2	February 18, 2001	1	5:00	Colusa, California, United States	
Win	6–1	Charlie West	Decision (unanimous)	Gladiator Challenge 1	December 9, 2000	3	5:00	San Jacinto, California, United States	
Win	5–1	Rob Smith	Decision (unanimous)	KOTC 6 – Road Warriors	November 29, 2000	2	5:00	Mt. Pleasant, Michigan, United States	
Win	4–1	Warren Owsley	Submission (armbar)	Dangerzone: Night of the Beast	October 28, 2000	1	6:04	Lynchburg, Virginia, United States	
Win	3–1	Ron Rumpf	TKO (punches)	Continental Freefighting Alliance 2	July 19, 2000	1	1:18	Corinth, Mississippi, United States	
Loss	2–1	Marvin Eastman	Decision (unanimous)	KOTC 4 – Gladiators	June 24, 2000	2	5:00	San Jacinto, California, United States	For the inaugural KOTC Super Heavyweight Championship.
Win	2–0	Marco Bermudaz	Submission (rear-naked choke)	Huntington Beach Underground Pancrase	May 13, 2000	1	7:17	Huntington Beach, California, United States	
Win	1–0	Mike Pyle	Decision (unanimous)	ISCF: Memphis	November 13, 1999	3	5:00	Memphis, Tennessee, United States	

== Kickboxing record ==
2 wins (1 KO), 0 losses
Result	Record	Opponent	Method	Event	Date	Round	Time	Location	Notes
Win	2–0	Cyril Abidi	Decision (unanimous)	Inoki Bom-Ba-Ye 2002	December 31, 2002	3	3:00	Saitama, Japan	
Win	1–0	Cyril Abidi	Knockout	K-1 World Grand Prix 2002 in Fukuoka	July 14, 2002	1	1:55	Fukuoka, Japan	Jackson's kickboxing debut.
Legend Win Loss Draw/No contest

== Fight Circus record ==
1 win (1 TKO), 0 losses
Result	Record	Opponent	Method	Event	Date	Round	Time	Location	Notes
Win	1–0	Jon Nutt and Andrew Wood	Knockout	Fight Circus 6: The Rise or Fall of Sloppy Balboa	April 2, 2023	3	0:37	Phuket, Thailand	Two-on-two Siamese boxing match. Jackson was teamed with Bob Sapp.
Legend Win Loss Draw/No contest

== Pay-per-view bouts ==
Date	Fight	Event	PPV Buys
May 26, 2007	Liddell vs. Jackson	UFC 71	675,000
July 5, 2008	Jackson vs. Griffin	UFC 86	540,000
March 7, 2009	Jackson vs. Jardine	UFC 96	350,000
May 29, 2010	Rampage vs. Evans	UFC 114	1,050,000
November 20, 2010	Rampage vs. Machida	UFC 123	500,000
May 28, 2011	Rampage vs. Hamill	UFC 130	325,000
September 24, 2011	Jones vs. Rampage	UFC 135	520,000
February 26, 2012	Rampage vs. Bader (co)	UFC 144	375,000
May 17, 2014	Jackson vs. Lawal	Bellator 120	100,000
Total sales			4,435,000

== Acting career ==
Jackson has appeared in Confessions of a Pit Fighter, Miss March, Bad Guys, The Midnight Meat Train, and Vigilante Diaries, as well as episodes of The King of Queens and Pimp My Ride. He starred in the films The A-Team, Never Surrender, Duel of Legends, and Death Warrior. Jackson also appeared in the Nike commercial, "Human Chain".

=== Filmography ===
Year	Title	Role	Notes
2001	Jackass	Himself	TV (Series 3 Episode 2)
2005	Confessions of a Pit Fighter	Matador (a cruel street fighter from Brazil)	Film
2006	The King of Queens	Priority Plus Driver	TV series (Episode: "Fight Schlub")(uncredited)
2008	Bad Guys	Leroy Johnson	Film
2008	The Ultimate Fighter: Team Rampage vs. Team Forrest	Himself (Coach)	TV series
2008	The Midnight Meat Train	Guardian Angel	Film
2009	Miss March	Himself	Film
2009	Never Surrender	Rampage	Film
2009	Hell's Chain	Jackson	Film
2009	Death Warrior	Wolf	Film
2009	The Ultimate Fighter: Heavyweights	Himself (Coach)	TV series
2010	Super Dave's Spike Tacular	Himself	TV series
2010	Guy's Choice	Himself	TV movie
2010	WWE Raw	Himself (guest host)	TV series (Episode: dated June 7, 2010)
2010	Cubed	Rampage	TV series (Episode: #1.39)
2010	The A-Team	B. A. Baracus	Film
2010	The Cleveland Show	Kunta Kinte 9000	TV series (Episode: "How Cleveland Got His Groove Back") (Voice)
2011	The World's Worst Bodyguard	N/A	Film (short)
2011	Duel of Legends	Jackson	Film
2012	Fire with Fire	Wallace	Film (straight-to-DVD)
2012	Ridiculousness	Himself (Guest host)	TV series (Episode: #2.04)
2013	TNA iMPACT! Wrestling	Rampage Jackson	TV series (Episode: "iMPACT Wrestling #476")
2013	Polyamory: Married & Dating	Himself	TV series
2014	See Dad Run	Bulk	TV series (Episode: "See Dad Get in the Ring")
2015	Bob Thunder: Internet Assassin	Quinton 'Rampage' Jackson	Film
2016	Vigilante Diaries	Wolfman	Film
2016	Never Back Down: No Surrender	Rampage	Film (straight-to-DVD)
2016	Rampage Returns	Rampage	TV movie
2017	Boone: The Bounty Hunter	Jackson	Film
2017	Cops and Robbers	Jesse	Film
2019	Acceleration	Eli	Film
2021	Boss Level	German Twin	Film
2024	Operation Blood Hunt	Reverend Conde	Film
2024	Snow White and the Seven Samurai		Film
2025	The Caretaker	Hudson	Film

== Personal life ==
Jackson resides in Ladera Ranch and has five children. Three of his children have the middle name of Rampage. Jackson and his wife, with whom he has two children, separated in 2006 after a paternity test proved that he had fathered a child with another woman in 1999. They initially reconciled but have since divorced. On October 2, 2023, Jackson welcomed a fifth child and second daughter. In 2010, Jackson lived in Merseyside in England and supports Everton F.C. He is an avid gamer, and streams in his free time on the streaming site Kick.

During an August 2025 KnokX professional wrestling event, Jackson's son Raja (also a mixed martial artist) slammed independent wrestler Syko Stu, then punched the apparently unconscious Stu over 20 times. Raja livestreamed the attack on Kick. Jackson condemned his son's actions and described the attack as a "work that went wrong". On September 18, 2025, Raja was arrested in Los Angeles and booked on a felony assault charge. On May 6, 2026, Raja pleaded guilty to the felony count of battery after reaching a plea deal with the prosecutors. He was sentenced to serve 90 days in prison on July 2, 2026.

== Controversies ==
In 2009, Jackson repeatedly dry-humped cage reporter Heather Nichols on camera during an interview. Nichols later described the experience as "awkward", not knowing what to do to stop him. Also in 2009, in an interview with an unidentified Japanese reporter, Jackson gets on all fours and proceeds to bark, sniff, grab, grope and hump the reporter from behind, with the terrified woman eventually squirming away.

In 2011, Jackson stuck his face in reporter Karyn Bryant's cleavage while simulating a sexual act, after making sexually explicit comments to her. Some condemnations followed, including an assessment of the incident as bordering on assault. In that same interview, Jackson went on to make light of his past indecent sexual advances by stating: "You know I've been humping reporters so you might want to get away ... I've been in a long training camp. Get away. Get away before I hump you in front of everybody."

In 2012, Jackson starred in a satirical video entitled "How to Pick Up a Gurl – Fast", where he suggests the use of chloroform and zip ties, as well as sneaking up on women in parking lots while already wearing a condom. As a result, and for repeatedly denigrating women, several women's organizations called for the UFC to pull Jackson from his then upcoming bout against Glover Teixeira. Sharmili Majmudar, the executive director of Rape Victims Advocates, stated that "when you hear or you see people in prominent roles essentially echoing those messages that sexual violence is a joke or it's no big deal or it's funny, it just compounds that experience for victims."

In 2013, Jackson directed more highly inappropriate comments toward female reporter Karyn Bryant during an interview just days after a petition was published seeking Rampage's removal from the UFC.

Jackson has repeatedly persuaded his Asian fans to make homophobic remarks about themselves on camera.

== Legal issues ==
On July 15, 2008, 10 days after losing his belt to Forrest Griffin, Jackson was arrested in Costa Mesa and booked on suspicion of felony reckless driving, and felony hit and run after striking several vehicles. He led pursuing officers on a chase while driving on the wrong side of the street and on city sidewalks in his lifted Ford F-350 with his picture painted on the side. During the chase, one of the tires blew out on his truck and he continued to flee while driving on his rims. On July 18, 2008, UFC President Dana White gave an interview to Yahoo! Sports in which he said that Jackson had initially been detained for a 72-hour stay, but that had been extended. White was quoted as saying: "I think it's going to be a while before we get him back." White also claimed that before the detainment, Jackson did not sleep for four days, had not been eating, and had only been drinking energy drinks and became mentally ill from dehydration. According to White, no drugs were found in Jackson's system.

Jackson was charged with one felony count of evading police while driving recklessly, one felony count of evading police and driving against traffic, three misdemeanor counts of hit and run with property damage, and one misdemeanor count of reckless driving when he nearly hit several pedestrians. Jackson faced up to 3 years in prison if convicted. On August 28, 2008, he pleaded not guilty to all of the charges; however, on January 8, 2009, he pleaded guilty to one felony count of evading a police officer and driving against traffic, and one misdemeanor count of driving recklessly as part of a plea agreement. A judge dismissed the charges against Jackson on January 8, 2010, citing that he had successfully completed 200 hours of community service and complied with other terms and conditions.

One of the victims in the above police chase, filed a civil suit against Jackson and claimed that the impact of her abdomen with the steering wheel caused her amniotic fluid membranes to rupture, ultimately resulting in the stillbirth of her baby. She requested $25,000 in damages for property damage, personal injury, and emotional distress. Farrah Emami, Spokesperson for the DA's office, said: "We reviewed all the medical records and spoke with the victim's physician, and the evidence showed that the loss of the fetus was not related to or a result of the crash caused by the defendant."

In May 2010 the woman dismissed her lawsuit against Jackson. It is unclear if the two sides reached a settlement.

In 2014, Jackson claimed that the reason of his reckless driving was trying to reach a friend's house in order to stop him from committing suicide.

== See also ==
- List of male mixed martial artists

Awards and achievements
Preceded by Chuck Liddell	7th UFC Light Heavyweight Champion; May 26, 2007 – July 5, 2008	Succeeded by Forrest Griffin
Preceded by Dan Henderson	3rd Pride FC Middleweight Champion; September 8, 2007	Title Unified with UFC Light Heavyweight Championship
