= Pride 33 =

Pride FC MMA event in 2007

- The poster for Pride 33
- Promotion: Pride Fighting Championships
- Date: February 24, 2007
- Venue: Thomas & Mack Center
- City: Las Vegas, Nevada, US
- Attendance: 12,911 (8,334 paid)
- Total gate: $2,033,098

Event chronology
Pride Shockwave 2006	Pride 33	Pride 34

Pride 33: The Second Coming was a mixed martial arts event held by Pride Fighting Championships on February 24, 2007, at the Thomas & Mack Center in Las Vegas, Nevada.

== Background ==
In the night's main event, the welterweight champion Dan Henderson knocked out Pride Middleweight Champion Wanderlei Silva to become the new middleweight champion. This victory by Henderson avenged an earlier loss to Silva after their first encounter in 2000 at Pride 12 - Cold Fury, with Silva winning that fight in a three-round unanimous decision.

A fight between Sergei Kharitonov and Gilbert Yvel was submitted for approval by the Nevada State Athletic Commission (NSAC). However, the fight did not take place after Yvel was denied a fighter's license by the NSAC based on a history of disqualification from multiple fights, most notably, his infamous attack on a referee. Kharitonov instead fought Mike Russow defeating him with an armbar.

A fight between Wes Sims and Kazuyuki Fujita was proposed but the NSAC turned it down due to competitive reasons—the fighters were at unequal experience/talent levels. After that a Wes Sims-Mark Hunt fight was turned down as well. The NSAC confirmed that Fujita would not be fighting anyone on the Pride 33 card as the deadline for receiving the medical records of fighters over the age of 35 (Fujita was 36) had passed (they must be submitted one week before the show so they can be properly reviewed and cleared).

Travis Wiuff's original opponent, Kazuhiro Nakamura, did not fight due to a knee injury.

Nick Diaz defeated Takanori Gomi in a non-title fight via Gogoplata. The victory was later ruled a No Contest due to a failed drug test (Cannabis) from Diaz.

The pay-per-view retailed for $34.99 and was announced by Lon McEachern, Frank Trigg, and Josh Barnett.

== Results ==
Card
Weight class				Method	Round	Time	Notes
Middleweight	Dan Henderson	def.	Wanderlei Silva (c)	KO (punches)	3	2:08	(Note: For the Pride Middleweight Championship.)
Lightweight	Nick Diaz	vs.	Takanori Gomi	NC (overturned)	2	1:46	(Note: Originally a submission (gogoplata) win for Diaz; later changed to no contest by the Nevada State Athletic Commission after Diaz tested positive for marijuana in a post-fight drug test.)
Heavyweight	Maurício Rua	def.	Alistair Overeem	KO (punches)	1	3:37
Catchweight (164 lbs)	Hayato Sakurai	def.	Mac Danzig	KO (punch)	2	4:01
Heavyweight	Rameau Thierry Sokoudjou	def.	Antônio Rogério Nogueira	KO (punch)	1	0:23
Heavyweight	Sergei Kharitonov	def.	Mike Russow	Submission (armbar)	1	3:46
Middleweight	Frank Trigg	def.	Kazuo Misaki	Decision (unanimous)	3	5:00
Catchweight (210 lbs)	James Lee	def.	Travis Wiuff	Submission (guillotine choke)	1	0:39
Lightweight	Joachim Hansen	def.	Jason Ireland	Submission (armbar)	3	2:33

== See also ==
- Pride FC
- List of Pride FC champions
- List of Pride FC events
- 2007 in Pride FC
