= Dan Henderson =

American Olympic wrestler and mixed martial arts fighter

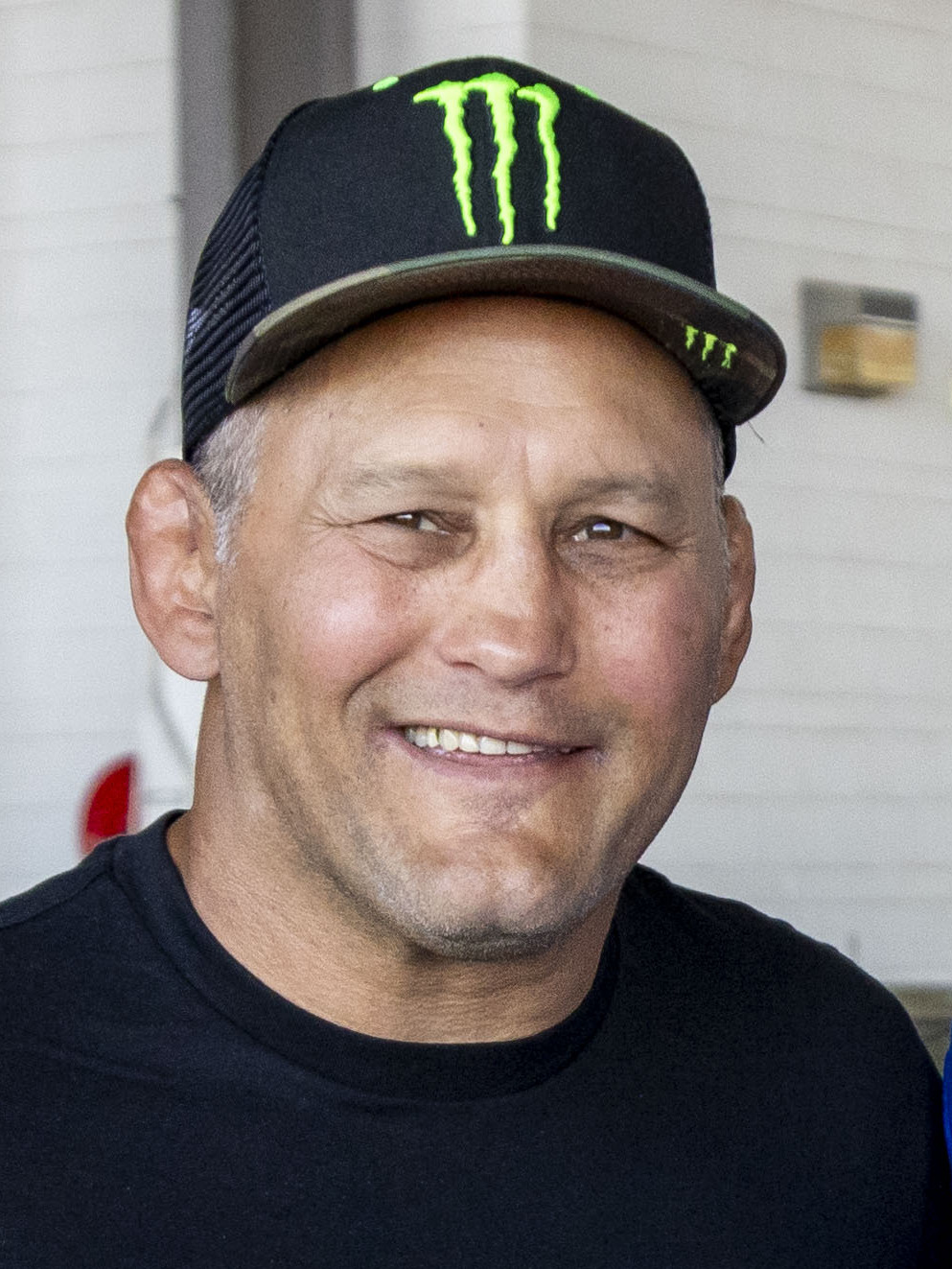
- Henderson in 2025
- Born: Daniel Jeffery Henderson; August 24, 1970 (age 56); Downey, California, U.S.
- Other names: Hendo
- Height: 6 ft 1 in (185 cm)
- Weight: 185 lb (84 kg; 13 st 3 lb)
- Division: Welterweight; Middleweight; Light heavyweight
- Reach: 74 in (188 cm)
- Style: Greco-Roman wrestling
- Stance: Orthodox
- Fighting out of: Temecula, California, U.S.
- Team: Team Quest (1999 – present); Dan Henderson Fitness Center
- Rank: 1st degree black belt in brazilian jiu-jitsu
- Wrestling: Olympian Greco-Roman wrestling NCAA Division I Wrestling
- Years active: 1997–2016 (MMA)

Mixed martial arts record
- Total: 47
- Wins: 32
- By knockout: 17
- By submission: 1
- By decision: 14
- Losses: 15
- By knockout: 3
- By submission: 4
- By decision: 8

Other information
- University: Cal State Fullerton; Arizona State University
- Children: 3
- Notable school: Victor Valley High School
- Website: danhenderson.com
- Mixed martial arts record from Sherdog
- Last updated on: September 21, 2011

Daniel Henderson
Personal information
- National team: United States of America
- Height: 5 ft 11 in (180 cm)
- Weight: 181 lb (82 kg)

Sport
- Sport: Wrestling
- Event: Greco-Roman
- College team: Arizona State Sun Devils
- Club: Dave Schultz Wrestling Club
- Coached by: Bob Anderson
Medal record
Men's Greco-Roman wrestling
Representing United States
World Cup
Silver medal – second place	1994 Kecskemet	82 kg
Silver medal – second place	1996 Colorado Springs	82 kg
Pan American Games
Bronze medal – third place	1995 Mar del Plata	82 kg
Pan American Championships
Gold medal – first place	2000 Cali	85 kg
Silver medal – second place	1994 Mexico City	82 kg
Bronze medal – third place	1998 Winnipeg	85 kg

Daniel Jeffery Henderson (born August 24, 1970) is an American former mixed martial artist and Olympic wrestler, who last competed as a Middleweight in the Ultimate Fighting Championship. He was the last Strikeforce Light Heavyweight Champion and was the last Welterweight and Middleweight champion of Pride Fighting Championships. He was the only double champion in the history of Pride FC.

Henderson was the Brazil Open '97 Tournament Champion, the UFC 17 Middleweight Tournament Champion, the Rings: King of Kings 1999 Tournament Champion and the Pride Welterweight Grand Prix Tournament Champion. Henderson also challenged for the UFC Middleweight Championship (2x), the UFC Light Heavyweight Championship and the Strikeforce Middleweight Championship. Henderson was the first mixed martial artist to hold two titles in two different weight classes concurrently in a major MMA promotion. At the time of his retirement after UFC 204, he was the oldest fighter on the UFC roster. Henderson's notable wins include four PRIDE champions (Emelianenko, Nogueira, Silva, and Misaki), six UFC champions (Rua, Belfort, Bisping, Bustamante, Franklin, and Newton), 2 Strikeforce champions (Sobral and Cavalcante), 1 Bellator champion (Lombard), and 1 Pancrase champion (Kondo), and he is ranked by Fight Matrix as the 16th greatest mixed martial artist of all time pound for pound.

== Wrestling career ==
Dan Henderson was born in Downey, California, and grew up in Apple Valley, California. He competed in freestyle wrestling, but is much better known for his achievements in Greco-Roman wrestling.

He attended Victor Valley High School in Victorville, California, and earned medals at the California State Wrestling Championships in 1987 and 1988. He placed second in 1987 and fifth in 1988. He was a member of the 1987 Victor Valley High School wrestling team state champions. In 1988 Henderson became a national junior champion in both Greco-Roman and freestyle wrestling.

After high school Henderson delayed pursuing a college wrestling career, yet he would go to wrestle a season each at Cal State Fullerton (CSUF) and Arizona State University (ASU). He qualified for the 1993 NCAA championships.

In Greco-Roman wrestling Henderson became the university national champion in 1991, 1993, and 1994. He was the national champion at the senior level in 1993, 1994, and 1997. He represented the United States in the 1992 and 1996 Summer Olympics and placed 10th and 12th, respectively.

Henderson competed at the World Wrestling Championships in 1994 and 1997, placing 12th and 7th respectively. Other notable accomplishments include a bronze medal at the 1995 Pan American Games and a gold medal in the 2000 Pan American Championships. At this competition Henderson upset Luis Enrique Méndez in the final.

Henderson failed to qualify for the 2000 Olympics. He reached the 2001 world team trials finals, but was defeated by Matt Lindland, and after that focused on an MMA career.

Henderson was also assistant wrestling coach at Cerritos College during the 1990s.

== Mixed martial arts career ==
Henderson began training in mixed martial arts in 1997, when he joined the Real American Wrestling team (RAW).

=== Brazil Open Tournament ===
1997 saw Henderson make his debut in MMA, following in the footsteps of other wrestlers who were finding success in the sport. Henderson entered the Brazil Open Lightweight Tournament, which had a weight limit of 176 pounds, the lightest Henderson would ever compete at. It was a one-night tournament, featuring four competitors. After two relatively quick finishes, Henderson won the championship.

=== UFC 17 ===
Less than one year later, Henderson entered his second MMA tournament, also a four-man tournament to be completed in one night. This time however, the weight limit was 199 pounds. UFC 17 would mark the start of Henderson's on-again off-again relationship with the UFC, which would span nearly two decades. He defeated Allan Goes and Carlos Newton in closely contested contests to earn his second MMA tournament championship. A punch delivered from Newton in their fight broke Henderson's jaw, but he continued fighting through it.

=== Rings: King Of Kings ===
About eighteen months later, Henderson entered his third MMA tournament. This time the number of competitors was 32, and there was no weight limit for any of the fighters. The tournament would be held over the course of two nights. The first two rounds were held in late 1999, while the final three were in early 2000. The tournament was full of many notable competitors, and Henderson faced Gilbert Yvel, Antônio Rodrigo Nogueira, and Renato Sobral. Despite weighing in at 199 pounds, and routinely being outweighed by more than 30 pounds, Henderson won all five of his fights, and became the Rings: King of Kings Tournament 1999 champion.

=== PRIDE Fighting Championships ===
Henderson began competing in Pride Fighting Championships in late 2000. He entered in three tournaments for the organization, winning the Welterweight (183 pounds) tournament at Pride Shockwave 2005 by defeating Murilo Bustamante by split decision. The opening two rounds of the eight-man tournament were fought at Pride Bushido 9, at which Henderson knocked out both Ryo Chonan and Akihiro Gono. Along with this tournament victory, he was awarded the Pride Welterweight Championship.

In 2006, Henderson lost a decision in a rematch against Kazuo Misaki. It was the first time in that he had lost a fight to an opponent who was under 205 pounds. Henderson's final Pride bout was a rematch with Wanderlei Silva at Pride 33 in Las Vegas, Nevada, on February 24, 2007, at which he scored a knockout victory to become Middleweight Champion (205 pounds), while still holding his Welterweight title. Henderson became the first fighter to hold titles in two different weight classes simultaneously in a major MMA organization. Overall, Henderson went 13–5 with Pride, with eight victories coming by stoppage.

=== UFC return ===
On September 8, 2007, Henderson returned to the UFC to face light heavyweight champion Quinton "Rampage" Jackson at UFC 75 in London, England. In a closely contested fight that saw Henderson impose his will early, Jackson controlled the later rounds and won a five-round unanimous decision to retain his title and gain the Pride middleweight title.

On November 17, 2007, it was announced during the post fight at UFC 78 that Henderson would fight UFC middleweight champion Anderson Silva to unify the Pride welterweight (183 lb) and UFC middleweight (185 lb) championships. UFC 82 took place on March 1, 2008, and was held at the Nationwide Arena in Columbus, Ohio. Despite winning the first round, Henderson lost via submission at 4:52 of the second round by rear naked choke. This fight earned him his first Fight of the Night award.

Henderson bounced back from his inauspicious start in the UFC with a victory over Rousimar Palhares at UFC 88, winning by unanimous decision. After ten years in the sport, it was his first UFC victory. After the bout, Henderson laughed and said, "Hopefully I don't have to wait that long before I get my next win."

Henderson returned to the light heavyweight division to face former UFC Middleweight champion Rich Franklin on January 17, 2009, at UFC 93 in Dublin, Ireland. Henderson won the fight via a split decision following an eye-poke in the third round that many, including Franklin, thought was intentional. He was subsequently selected to lead Team U.S. on season 9 of The Ultimate Fighter, with Michael Bisping coaching the opposing Team UK.

=== Coaching The Ultimate Fighter and aftermath ===
The reality TV show, which spawned a feud between the two coaches that continued until their fight, aired on Spike TV and premiered on April 1, 2009, with the live finale on June 20, 2009, in Las Vegas.

On July 11, 2009, at UFC 100 at the Mandalay Bay Events Center in Las Vegas, Henderson and Bisping fought, culminating in Henderson becoming the first man to knock Bisping out, doing so in the second round with an overhand right to the jaw as Bisping was circling to Henderson's right. This win put Henderson back into contention for a title shot at the UFC Middleweight Champion. The knockout punch won Henderson a $100,000 bonus for "Knockout of the Night" and is considered one of the greatest knockouts in the history of the sport.

Controversy arose from the fight due to Henderson immediately following up his knockout punch with a flying forearm-drop to the undefended Bisping's head shortly before referee Mario Yamasaki ended the fight at 3:20.

Immediately after the fight, Henderson stated that "I hit him hard, but I got that last blow in just to shut him up a little bit." After UFC president Dana White said Henderson had made the comment in jest, Henderson clarified by stating, "When you're in the heat of the moment, the ref hadn't stopped me yet, who knows what's going to happen, if he's going to recover. I really only hit him twice, once on my feet, once on the ground. I didn't keep going. I didn't go after him after the ref tried to stop me, it was nothing like that. It was a reaction of mine to keep going until I was stopped—and you know, it did feel good though."

=== Strikeforce ===
Dan Henderson signed a four-fight, 16-month deal with Strikeforce on December 5, 2009, after his contract expired with the UFC. Henderson made his Strikeforce debut on April 17, 2010, at Strikeforce on CBS against Jake Shields. He was also eyed for a light heavyweight match against Gegard Mousasi, and expressed interest in eventually fighting Fedor Emelianenko at some point during his contract. Henderson lost his Strikeforce debut to Jake Shields. Despite hurting Shields and knocking him down in the 1st round, Henderson went on to lose by unanimous decision. The majority of the last rounds were spent on the ground where Shields controlled the fight via grappling. (49–46, 49–45, 48–45).

Henderson faced Renato Sobral on December 4, 2010, at Strikeforce: Henderson vs. Babalu. Henderson won the fight via KO at 1:53 of the first round.

Henderson defeated Rafael Cavalcante via third-round TKO for the Strikeforce Light Heavyweight Championship at Strikeforce 32. After two rounds in which all three judges had the score tied 19–19, Henderson dropped Cavalcante with his famed right hand in the third before referee Dan Miragliotta called the fight off at the 0:50 mark.

Henderson fought Fedor Emelianenko on July 30, 2011, at Strikeforce: Fedor vs. Henderson. Many had speculated that Henderson would meet Fedor at a catch weight, but Strikeforce later confirmed the fight as a heavyweight bout. Henderson said, "Its tough for me to gain weight. I did weightlifting and plenty of eating; I don't know what else I'm supposed to do. I'm not going to feel outmatched or small in there." He had to step on the scales weighing at least 206 pounds in order to qualify for the heavyweight division, and weighed in at 207. Fedor weighed in a bit below his normal weight, with the scale reading 223 pounds. Henderson defeated Emelianenko via KO at 4:12 of the 1st round. This was the last fight on Henderson's Strikeforce contract. Henderson said he would like to re-sign to defend his Strikeforce Light Heavyweight Championship.

=== Third UFC run ===
Shortly after the UFC 133 pre-fight press conference, Dana White commented on the potential to bring Henderson back to the UFC for a third go-around. "We'll see what happens," White said on Thursday in Philadelphia. "'Hendo and I have had some history in dealing. We'll see if we can figure something out and get him back in the UFC." Later Henderson commented, "I think the biggest fight they could promote is probably a title unification with whoever is the champ in the UFC."

Henderson faced Maurício Rua on November 19, 2011, at UFC 139 for his third run in the UFC. He won the bout via unanimous decision. The back and forth action earned both fighters Fight of the Night honors, and was described by many as one of the greatest fights in UFC history.

UFC President Dana White announced during the post-fight press conference of UFC 145 that Henderson would be the next opponent for Light Heavyweight Champion Jon Jones.

The bout with Jones was expected to take place on September 1, 2012, at UFC 151. However, Henderson withdrew from the fight citing a knee injury, and the remainder of the fight card was cancelled.

Henderson faced Lyoto Machida on February 23, 2013, at UFC 157. He lost the bout via split decision.

Henderson faced Rashad Evans on June 15, 2013, in the main event at UFC 161. He lost via split decision.

Henderson faced Vitor Belfort in a rematch on November 9, 2013, at UFC Fight Night 32. Henderson defeated Belfort in their first encounter in 2006 at Pride 32 via unanimous decision. He lost the fight via knockout in the first round, marking the first time in his MMA career that he had been stopped due to strikes. The match with Belfort was the last fight of Henderson's contract with UFC. On January 22, Henderson revealed to UFC Tonight that he signed a new, six-fight contract with the UFC.

In January 2014, a rematch with Maurício Rua was announced to take place on March 23, 2014, at UFC Fight Night 38. Despite losing the first two rounds after being knocked down by Rua, Henderson rallied back in the third round and won the fight via TKO due to punches. The win also earned Henderson his third Fight of the Night bonus and first Performance of the Night bonus.

Making a quick return to the cage, Henderson faced a much larger Daniel Cormier on May 24, 2014, at UFC 173. He lost the fight via submission (technical submission/rear-naked choke) in the third round after being out-wrestled and held down on the bottom for the majority of the fight.

On November 12, 2014, the UFC announced that Henderson would move down to Middleweight to face Gegard Mousasi on January 24, 2015, in the co-main event at UFC on Fox 14. He lost the fight via TKO in the first round.

Henderson faced Tim Boetsch on June 6, 2015, in the main event at UFC Fight Night 68. He won the fight via knockout at 28 seconds of the first round.

Henderson faced Vitor Belfort in a rubber match in the main event at UFC Fight Night 77. He again lost the bout via a combination of head kick and punches.

A rematch with Lyoto Machida was expected to take place at Middleweight on April 16, 2016, at UFC on Fox 19. However, on April 13, the UFC announced that Machida declared the usage of a banned substance during an out-of-competition sample collection last week. Machida stated that he was unaware that the substance was prohibited both in and out of competition. Therefore, he was removed from the bout and Henderson was re-booked for another event at a later date.

Henderson was quickly rescheduled to face Héctor Lombard on June 4, 2016, at UFC 199. He won the fight via knockout in the second round via a head kick followed by a reverse elbow and earned himself a Performance of the Night bonus, as well as becoming the first fighter to knock Lombard out cold.

Henderson faced then UFC Middleweight Champion Michael Bisping, in a rematch on October 8, 2016, at UFC 204. Despite dropping and nearly finishing Bisping in both the first and second round, he wound up losing the back and forth fight via unanimous decision. Both fighters were awarded Fight of the Night for their performance. At the conclusion of the fight, Henderson confirmed his intention to retire from fighting.

Dan Henderson was inducted into the Fight Wing of the UFC Hall of Fame at the UFC Fan Expo on July 5, 2018, alongside Maurício Rua, for their fight in 2011.

== Personal life ==
Henderson grew up on a ranch in Apple Valley, California. He started wrestling at a young age and started being noticed as a relentless competitor. When Henderson entered high school, he placed on the wrestling team with his brother Tom at Victor Valley High, which was coached by Sam Gollmyer and assisted by their father Bill Henderson and Joe Barrios. He is of Native American, English, Scottish and French descent. Henderson had previously been prescribed testosterone replacement therapy (TRT) after being diagnosed with low testosterone levels in 2007. However, TRT has no longer been allowed in UFC competition since 2014. After TRT was banned, Henderson said that he quit using TRT "cold turkey".

Henderson was coached by Bob Anderson, of the defunct California Jets. He placed second at the California State Wrestling Championship in 1987 and Victor Valley won the team title. In 1988, he placed fifth in the state finals and several months later won national crowns in both freestyle and Greco Roman at the Junior Nationals in Cedar Falls, Iowa.

According to the March 2007 Confederated Umatilla Journal: "Henderson's grandmother, Alice (Bergevin) LeJune, is an enrolled member of the Confederated Tribes and owns land on the Umatilla Indian Reservation. From all accounts, Henderson is 1/16 Walla Walla Native American." In the interview Henderson commented, "Now I know I'm Walla Walla. It's refreshing to find some of those things out. I look Indian and I knew I had some, but I didn't know what tribe or exactly how much. It will be good to be able to tell my kids about their heritage."

Following a series of successful fundraising events, including an annual charity golf tournament and a charity pig roast, Henderson formally established the Hendo Foundation in 2025. The nonprofit is based in Temecula, California, and is dedicated to providing free wrestling and mixed martial arts training to underprivileged youth, and veterans in need; as well as community support programs for military veterans and first responders across the Southern California region. Operating out of 27901 Jefferson Avenue in Temecula, the foundation serves communities throughout Temecula, Murrieta, and the greater San Diego area, with programs centered on health and wellness, leadership development, and character-building through athletic training and mentorship. Its charitable partners in previous years include Veterans Exploring Treatment Solutions (VETS), Veterans for Child Rescue (V4CR), America's Might Warriors, War Party Ranch, and The Special Forces Charitable Trust

On May 31, 2025, Henderson opened Hendo's Barrel House, an American restaurant and bar located at 27901 Jefferson Avenue in Temecula, California. The establishment specializes in prime cuts, craft beers, and cocktails, and features an outdoor patio with a fire pit and a full marble bar. The venue regularly hosts community events including fight night viewings and game-day gatherings, and is available for private event bookings.

== Team Quest ==
Dan Henderson is an owner of Team Quest Fitness Gym located in Temecula, California.

As of February 28, 2011, Henderson is in litigation over the Team Quest trademark with former teammate Matt Lindland.

== Championships and accomplishments ==
=== Mixed martial arts ===
- Ultimate Fighting Championship
  - UFC Hall of Fame (Fight Wing, Class of 2018) vs. Maurício Rua 1 at UFC 139
  - UFC 17 Middleweight Tournament Championship
  - Fight of the Night (Four times) vs. Anderson Silva, Maurício Rua 1, Maurício Rua 2 and Michael Bisping 2
  - Knockout of the Night (One time) vs. Michael Bisping 1
  - Performance of the Night (Two times) vs. Maurício Rua 2 and Héctor Lombard
  - UFC Encyclopedia Awards
    - Fight of the Night (One time) vs. Carlos Newton
  - Tied (Charles Oliveira & Neil Magny) for fourth most wins in Zuffa, LLC (UFC, Pride, WEC, Strikeforce) history (25)
  - Thrid most knockdowns in Zuffa, LLC (UFC, Pride, WEC, Strikeforce) history (20)
  - Oldest combatant to fight for a UFC championship (46 years)
  - Holds wins over four former UFC champions — Vitor Belfort, Rich Franklin, Michael Bisping and Maurício Rua (x2).
  - UFC.com Awards
    - 2009: Ranked #8 Fighter of the Year & Ranked #4 Knockout of the Year vs. Michael Bisping 1
    - 2011: Fight of the Year vs. Maurício Rua 1 & Ranked #6 Fighter of the Year (Tied with Nate Diaz)
    - 2014: Ranked #6 Knockout of the Year & Ranked #9 Fight of the Year vs. Maurício Rua 2
    - 2016: Ranked #9 Knockout of the Year vs. Héctor Lombard
- Pride Fighting Championships
  - Pride Middleweight Championship (One time; Last)
  - Pride Welterweight Championship (One time; First; Last)
  - 2005 Pride Welterweight Grand Prix Champion
  - First combatant to win Pride championships in multiple weight classes
  - First combatant to simultaneously hold multiple Pride championships
  - One of only two fighters to win Tournaments in both Pride FC and UFC
- Strikeforce
  - Strikeforce Light Heavyweight Championship (One time, Last)
  - Oldest combatant to win a Strikeforce championship (40 years, 194 days)
- Fighting Network RINGS
  - RINGS King of Kings 1999 Tournament Winner
- Brazil Open Fight
  - Brazil Open 1997 Lightweight Tournament Winner
- World MMA Awards
  - 2009 Knockout of the Year vs. Michael Bisping at UFC 100
- ESPN
  - 2011 Fight of the Year vs. Maurício Rua on November 19
  - 2011 Round of the Year vs. Maurício Rua on November 19; Round 1
- Sherdog
  - 2011 All-Violence Second Team
- Inside MMA
  - 2011 Fight of the Year Bazzie Award vs. Maurício Rua on November 19
- Inside Fights
  - 2009 Knockout of the Year vs. Michael Bisping on July 11
- Cagewriters
  - 2009 Knockout of the Year vs. Michael Bisping at UFC 100
- Wrestling Observer Newsletter
  - 2011 Fight of the Year vs. Maurício Rua on November 19
- MMA Fighting
  - 2011 Fight of the Year vs. Maurício Rua on November 19
- FIGHT! Magazine
  - 2009 Knockout of the Year vs. Michael Bisping on July 11
- Bleacher Report
  - 2009 Knockout of the Year vs. Michael Bisping on July 11
- Black Belt Magazine
  - 2007 MMA Fighter of the Year
  - Black Belt Magazine Hall of Famer
- CBS Sports
  - 2016 #8 Ranked UFC Fight of the Year vs. Michael Bisping
- MMA Junkie
  - 2016 #4 Ranked Knockout of the Year vs. Héctor Lombard at UFC 199

=== Amateur wrestling ===
- International Federation of Associated Wrestling Styles
  - 2000 Henri Deglane Challenge Senior Greco-Roman Bronze Medalist
  - 2000 Pan American Championships Senior-Greco Roman Gold Medalist
  - 1999 Nordvest Cup Senior Greco-Roman Bronze Medalist
  - 1998 Henri Deglane Challenge Senior Greco-Roman Bronze Medalist
  - 1998 Pan American Championships Senior Greco-Roman Bronze Medalist
  - 1998 FILA Test Tournament Senior Greco-Roman Gold Medalist
  - 1998 Tropheo Milone Tournament Senior Greco-Roman Gold Medalist
  - 1998 Vehbi Emri Tournament Senior Greco-Roman Silver Medalist
  - 1997 Concord Cup International Senior Greco-Roman Silver Medalist
  - 1997 Gold Medal Challenge Senior Greco-Roman Gold Medalist
  - 1996 World Cup Senior Greco-Roman Silver Medalist
  - 1995 Pan American Games Senior Greco-Roman Bronze Medalist
  - 1995 Sunkist Kids International Open Senior Greco-Roman Gold Medalist
  - 1994 World Cup Senior Greco-Roman Silver Medalist
  - 1994 Pan American Championships Senior Greco-Roman Silver Medalist
  - 1990 World Wrestling Championships Junior Greco-Roman Gold Medalist
  - 1984 Pan American Championships Senior Greco-Roman Silver Medalist
- National Wrestling Hall of Fame and Museum
  - Lifetime Service to Wrestling Award (2010)
- California Wrestling Hall of Fame
  - 2013 CWHOF Inductee
- USA Wrestling
  - USA Senior Greco-Roman Olympic Team Trials Winner (1992, 1996)
  - Senior Greco-Roman World Team Trials Winner (1994, 1997)
  - Senior Greco-Roman World Team Trials Runner-up (1999, 2001)
  - USA Senior Greco-Roman National Championship (1993, 1994, 1997)
  - USA Senior Greco-Roman National Championship Runner-up (2000)
  - USA University Greco-Roman National Championship (1991, 1993, 1994)
  - USA Junior Greco-Roman National Championship (1988)
  - USA Junior Freestyle National Championship (1988)
  - 1999 Mini-Tournament at World Team Trials Senior Greco-Roman Gold Medalist
- Amateur Wrestling News Magazine
  - 1990 Amateur Wrestling News Freshman All-American
- California Interscholastic Federation
  - CIF High School State Championship Runner-up (1987)
  - CIF All-State (1987, 1988)
  - CIF Southern Section Championship (1987, 1988)

== Mixed martial arts record ==
Professional record breakdown
47 matches	32 wins	15 losses
By knockout	17	3
By submission	1	4
By decision	14	8

Res.	Record	Opponent	Method	Event	Date	Round	Time	Location	Notes
Loss	32–15	Michael Bisping	Decision (unanimous)	UFC 204	October 8, 2016	5	5:00	Manchester, England	For the UFC Middleweight Championship. Fight of the Night.
Win	32–14	Héctor Lombard	KO (elbow)	UFC 199	June 4, 2016	2	1:27	Inglewood, California, United States	Performance of the Night.
Loss	31–14	Vitor Belfort	KO (punches)	UFC Fight Night: Belfort vs. Henderson 3	November 7, 2015	1	2:07	São Paulo, Brazil	
Win	31–13	Tim Boetsch	KO (punches)	UFC Fight Night: Boetsch vs. Henderson	June 6, 2015	1	0:28	New Orleans, Louisiana, United States	
Loss	30–13	Gegard Mousasi	TKO (punches)	UFC on Fox: Gustafsson vs. Johnson	January 24, 2015	1	1:10	Stockholm, Sweden	Return to Middleweight.
Loss	30–12	Daniel Cormier	Technical Submission (rear-naked choke)	UFC 173	May 24, 2014	3	3:53	Las Vegas, Nevada, United States	
Win	30–11	Maurício Rua	TKO (punches)	UFC Fight Night: Shogun vs. Henderson 2	March 23, 2014	3	1:31	Natal, Brazil	Performance of the Night. Fight of the Night.
Loss	29–11	Vitor Belfort	KO (head kick)	UFC Fight Night: Belfort vs. Henderson 2	November 9, 2013	1	1:17	Goiânia, Brazil	
Loss	29–10	Rashad Evans	Decision (split)	UFC 161	June 15, 2013	3	5:00	Winnipeg, Manitoba, Canada	
Loss	29–9	Lyoto Machida	Decision (split)	UFC 157	February 23, 2013	3	5:00	Anaheim, California, United States	
Win	29–8	Maurício Rua	Decision (unanimous)	UFC 139	November 19, 2011	5	5:00	San Jose, California, United States	Fight of the Night.
Win	28–8	Fedor Emelianenko	TKO (punches)	Strikeforce: Fedor vs. Henderson	July 30, 2011	1	4:12	Hoffman Estates, Illinois, United States	Heavyweight bout.
Win	27–8	Rafael Cavalcante	TKO (punches)	Strikeforce: Feijao vs. Henderson	March 5, 2011	3	0:50	Columbus, Ohio, United States	Won the Strikeforce Light Heavyweight Championship. Henderson vacated the title on September 19, 2011 when his contract was absorbed by the UFC.
Win	26–8	Renato Sobral	KO (punches)	Strikeforce: St. Louis	December 4, 2010	1	1:53	St. Louis, Missouri, United States	Return to Light Heavyweight. Strikeforce Light Heavyweight title eliminator.
Loss	25–8	Jake Shields	Decision (unanimous)	Strikeforce: Nashville	April 17, 2010	5	5:00	Nashville, Tennessee, United States	For the Strikeforce Middleweight Championship.
Win	25–7	Michael Bisping	KO (punch)	UFC 100	July 11, 2009	2	3:20	Las Vegas, Nevada, United States	UFC Middleweight title eliminator. Knockout of the Night.
Win	24–7	Rich Franklin	Decision (split)	UFC 93	January 17, 2009	3	5:00	Dublin, Ireland	Light Heavyweight bout.
Win	23–7	Rousimar Palhares	Decision (unanimous)	UFC 88	September 6, 2008	3	5:00	Atlanta, Georgia, United States	
Loss	22–7	Anderson Silva	Submission (rear-naked choke)	UFC 82	March 1, 2008	2	4:52	Columbus, Ohio, United States	Return to Middleweight. For the UFC Middleweight Championship. Fight of the Night.
Loss	22–6	Quinton Jackson	Decision (unanimous)	UFC 75	September 8, 2007	5	5:00	London, England	For the UFC Light Heavyweight Championship.
Win	22–5	Wanderlei Silva	KO (punches)	Pride 33	February 24, 2007	3	2:08	Las Vegas, Nevada, United States	Won the Pride Middleweight Championship (205 lb).
Win	21–5	Vitor Belfort	Decision (unanimous)	Pride 32 – The Real Deal	October 21, 2006	3	5:00	Las Vegas, Nevada, United States	Light Heavyweight bout.
Loss	20–5	Kazuo Misaki	Decision (unanimous)	Pride – Bushido 12	August 26, 2006	2	5:00	Nagoya, Japan	Pride 2006 Welterweight Grand Prix Quarterfinal.
Win	20–4	Kazuo Misaki	Decision (unanimous)	Pride – Bushido 10	April 2, 2006	2	5:00	Tokyo, Japan	
Win	19–4	Murilo Bustamante	Decision (split)	Pride Shockwave 2005	December 31, 2005	2	5:00	Saitama, Japan	Won the Pride 2005 Welterweight Grand Prix and the Pride Welterweight Championship (183 lb).
Win	18–4	Akihiro Gono	KO (punch)	Pride Bushido 9	September 25, 2005	1	7:58	Tokyo, Japan	Pride 2005 Welterweight Grand Prix Semifinal.
Win	17–4	Ryo Chonan	KO (punch)	Pride Bushido 9	September 25, 2005	1	0:22	Tokyo, Japan	Pride 2005 Welterweight Grand Prix Second Round.
Loss	16–4	Antônio Rogério Nogueira	Submission (armbar)	Pride Total Elimination 2005	April 23, 2005	1	8:05	Osaka, Japan	Pride 2005 Middleweight Grand Prix Opening Round.
Win	16–3	Yuki Kondo	Decision (split)	Pride Shockwave 2004	December 31, 2004	3	5:00	Saitama, Japan	
Win	15–3	Kazuhiro Nakamura	TKO (shoulder injury)	Pride 28	October 31, 2004	1	1:15	Saitama, Japan	
Win	14–3	Murilo Bustamante	TKO (punches)	Pride Final Conflict 2003	November 9, 2003	1	0:53	Tokyo, Japan	Pride 2003 Middleweight Grand Prix Reserve bout.
Win	13–3	Shungo Oyama	TKO (punches)	Pride 25	March 16, 2003	1	3:28	Yokohama, Japan	
Loss	12–3	Antônio Rodrigo Nogueira	Submission (armbar)	Pride 24	December 23, 2002	3	1:49	Fukuoka, Japan	
Loss	12–2	Ricardo Arona	Decision (split)	Pride 20	April 28, 2002	3	5:00	Yokohama, Japan	
Win	12–1	Murilo Rua	Decision (split)	Pride 17	November 3, 2001	3	5:00	Tokyo, Japan	
Win	11–1	Akira Shoji	TKO (punches and knees)	Pride 14 – Clash of the Titans	May 27, 2001	3	3:18	Yokohama, Japan	
Win	10–1	Renzo Gracie	KO (punch)	Pride 13 – Collision Course	March 25, 2001	1	1:40	Saitama, Japan	
Loss	9–1	Wanderlei Silva	Decision (unanimous)	Pride 12 – Cold Fury	December 23, 2000	2	10:00	Saitama, Japan	
Win	9–0	Renato Sobral	Decision (majority)	Rings: King of Kings 1999 Final	February 26, 2000	2	5:00	Tokyo, Japan	Rings' King of Kings 1999 Tournament Final.
Win	8–0	Antônio Rodrigo Nogueira	Decision (split)	Rings: King of Kings 1999 Final	February 26, 2000	3	5:00	Tokyo, Japan	Rings' King of Kings 1999 Tournament Semifinal.
Win	7–0	Gilbert Yvel	Decision (unanimous)	Rings: King of Kings 1999 Final	February 26, 2000	2	5:00	Tokyo, Japan	Rings' King of Kings 1999 Tournament Quarterfinal.
Win	6–0	Hiromitsu Kanehara	Decision (majority)	Rings: King of Kings 1999 Block A	October 28, 1999	2	5:00	Tokyo, Japan	Rings' King of Kings 1999 Tournament 2nd Round.
Win	5–0	Bakouri Gogitidze	TKO (submission to knee to the body)	Rings: King of Kings 1999 Block A	October 28, 1999	1	2:17	Tokyo, Japan	Rings' King of Kings 1999 Tournament Opening Round.
Win	4–0	Carlos Newton	Decision (split)	UFC 17	May 15, 1998	1	15:00	Mobile, Alabama, United States	Won the UFC 17 Middleweight Tournament.
Win	3–0	Allan Goes	Decision (unanimous)	UFC 17	May 15, 1998	1	15:00	Mobile, Alabama, United States	UFC 17 Middleweight Tournament Semifinal.
Win	2–0	Eric Smith	Technical Submission (guillotine choke)	Brazil Open '97	June 15, 1997	1	0:30	Brazil	Won the Brazil Open 1997 Tournament.
Win	1–0	Crezio de Souza	TKO (punches)	Brazil Open '97	June 15, 1997	1	5:25	Brazil	Brazil Open '97 Tournament Semifinals.

== Pay-per-view bouts ==
No.	Event	Fight	Date	Venue	City	PPV Buys
1.	UFC 82	Silva vs. Henderson	March 1, 2008	Nationwide Arena	Columbus, Ohio, United States	325,000
2.	UFC 93	Franklin vs. Henderson	January 17, 2009	The O2	Dublin, Ireland	350,000
3.	UFC 139	Shogun vs. Henderson	November 19, 2011	HP Pavilion	San Jose, California, United States	290,000
4.	UFC 161	Evans vs. Henderson	June 15, 2013	MTS Centre	Winnipeg, Manitoba, Canada	140,000
5.	UFC 204	Bisping vs. Henderson 2	October 8, 2016	Manchester Arena	Manchester, England, United Kingdom	290,000

== Submission grappling record ==
2 Matches, 2 Losses (2 Submissions)
Result	Rec.	Opponent	Method	Event	Division	Date	Location
Loss	0-2	(United States) Jon Jones	Submission (arm-triangle choke)	Submission Underground 2	Superfight	December 10, 2016	(United States) Portland, OR
Loss	0-1	(United States) Frank Shamrock	Submission (heel hook)	The Contenders	Superfight	October 11, 1997	(United States) Sioux City, IA

== Championship titles ==
Preceded by Pat Miletich	UFC 17 UFC Middleweight Tournament winner May 15, 1998	Succeeded by Kenichi Yamamoto
New championship	Pride FC Welterweight Tournament winner December 31, 2005	Succeeded by Kazuo Misaki
New championship	1st Pride FC Welterweight Champion; December 31, 2005 – March 1, 2008	Title Unified with UFC Middleweight Championship
Preceded by Wanderlei Silva	2nd Pride FC Middleweight Champion; February 24, 2007 – September 8, 2007	Title Unified with UFC Light Heavyweight Championship
Preceded by Rafael Cavalcante	6th Strikeforce Light Heavyweight Champion; March 5, 2011 – September 19, 2011	Vacant Henderson signed with the UFC

== Filmography ==
Film
Year	Title	Role	Notes
2012	Dragon Eyes	Officer Filnari, Beating Police Officer	

Television
Year	Title	Role	Notes
2019	Seal Team	Himself	Episode: "All Along the Watchtower: Part 1"
2006	The King of Queens	Priority Plus Driver	Episode: "Fight Schlub"
2005	Cubed	Himself	

== See also ==
- List of male mixed martial artists
- List of Pride FC alumni
- List of Pride champions
- List of Strikeforce alumni
- List of Strikeforce champions
- List of UFC tournament winners
- List of male mixed martial artists
- Double champions in MMA
