= Wanderlei Silva =

Brazilian mixed martial artist (born 1976)

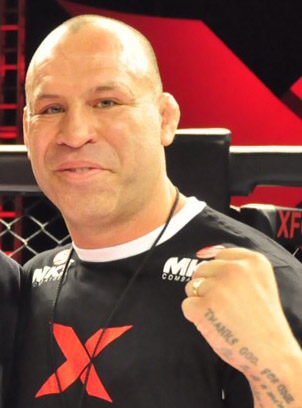
- Silva in 2015
- Born: Wanderlei César da Silva; 3 July 1976 (age 50); Curitiba, Brazil
- Other names: The Axe Murderer
- Height: 5 ft 10 in (178 cm)
- Weight: 185 lb (84 kg; 13 st 3 lb)
- Division: Middleweight; Light Heavyweight; Heavyweight
- Reach: 74 in (188 cm)
- Fighting out of: Curitiba, Brazil
- Team: Chute Boxe Academy (1996–2007); Wand Fight Team (2007–present); Kings MMA (2011–2018); Evolução Thai Brasil (2018–present)
- Trainer: Rudimar Fedrigo; Cristiano Marcello; André Amado
- Rank: Black belt in Brazilian Jiu-Jitsu; Black prajiad in Muay Thai
- Years active: 1996–2018

Mixed martial arts record
- Total: 51
- Wins: 35
- By knockout: 27
- By submission: 1
- By decision: 7
- Losses: 14
- By knockout: 7
- By decision: 7
- Draws: 1
- No contests: 1

Other information
- Mixed martial arts record from Sherdog
- Last updated on: 14 September 2011

Wanderlei César da Silva (/ˈvændərleɪ/ VAN-dər-lay, Brazilian Portuguese: [vɐ̃deʁˈlej ˈsɛzɐʁ dɐ ˈsiwvɐ], Japanese: [bandaɾeː ɕi.ɯba]; born 3 July 1976) is a Brazilian former mixed martial artist who competed in Japan's Pride Fighting Championships and the Ultimate Fighting Championship (UFC). He holds the record for the most wins, knockouts, title defenses and longest winning streak in PRIDE history. He is the former PRIDE Middleweight Champion and the 2003 PRIDE Middleweight Grand Prix Tournament Champion. He most recently competed for Bellator MMA in the light heavyweight and heavyweight divisions. In February 2024, Silva was announced as the next inductee in the "pioneer wing" of the UFC Hall of Fame.

== Mixed martial arts career ==
=== Early career ===
Silva's aggressive style is rooted in street brawling, refined with elements of Muay Thai and kickboxing, which he began learning at the age of 13 in Chute Boxe Academy in his hometown Curitiba. In his late teens, he joined the Brazilian army and was quickly recognized for his fighting talents. He was asked to join Vale Tudo and Brazilian jiu-jitsu school. Silva enlisted after winning several fight tournaments within his age group in Brazil. There was a time when he developed a scar tissue around his eyes from fighting in bare-knuckle vale tudo.

Silva's first professional match was on 1 November 1996, in the bare-knuckle organization Brazilian Vale Tudo Fighting (BVF). In this fight, he was able to knock out Dilson Filho via right elbow at BVF 6. He fought in another match in BVF, BVF 10 on 1 July 1997, against Marcelo Barbosa, who submitted due to a shoulder injury.

Silva fought six matches in four different International Vale Tudo Championship events, IVC 2, IVC 6, IVC 9 and IVC 10, from 1997 to 1999. He won five of these matches by KO/TKO, with his one loss being the result of a cut stoppage against Artur Mariano in the IVC 2 show on 15 September 1997. Though Silva dominated Mariano with punches and knee strikes, the cut above Silva's left eyelid opened back up several times, partially because Silva continued to use the cut side of his head to inflict many headbutts on Mariano over the course of the match. The doctor observed the cut several times before the fight was officially ended.

Silva culminated his IVC career by winning the promotion's Cruiserweight belt with a submission win over Eugene Jackson in the IVC 10 show on 27 April 1999. It was after this fight that Silva earned the nickname "The Axe Murderer".

Silva participated in one Meca World Vale Tudo event, Meca 2 on 12 August 2000, where he knocked out Todd Medina with Muay Thai knees.

=== Ultimate Fighting Championship ===
Silva entered the UFC on 16 October 1998, at UFC Brazil: Ultimate Brazil, in a match against Vitor Belfort. The match was arguably the worst defeat of his career, lasting only 44 seconds and left him knocked down against the cage by Belfort's punches then being stopped by the referee. Silva won his next UFC match on 7 May 1999, at UFC 20, in which he knocked out Tony Petarra with knees. On 14 April 2000, Silva fought for the UFC Light Heavyweight Championship, but lost via unanimous decision to Tito Ortiz at UFC 25.

=== Pride Fighting championships ===
Silva debuted in PRIDE at the Pride 7 event on 12 September 1999, against Carl Ognibene (better known as Carl "Malenko"). Silva used his strength to control Malenko from the ground, demonstrating his grappling expertise, coming very close to securing a guillotine choke and a rear-naked choke during round one, in addition to landing many powerful knees from the clinch. Silva continued to dominate Malenko en route to a decision victory. This dominance would set the tone for Silva's career in the organization. From 1999 to 2004, Silva won eighteen-straight fights in PRIDE, excluding a draw against Mirko Cro Cop (under slightly modified rules in which if the match would go to the time limit, the bout would be declared a draw) and a no contest against Gilbert Yvel (Silva accidentally kicked Yvel in the groin), giving him a twenty-fight unbeaten streak. Silva's reputation as a formidable MMA fighter grew as he developed a successful 5-year win record in the middle weight division (205 lb) of Pride.

Silva fought Japanese superstar Kazushi Sakuraba for the first time at Pride 13 - Collision Course on 25 March 2001. Silva won via TKO (knees and soccer kick) at 1:38 into the first round. At Pride 17: Championship Chaos on 3 November 2001, Silva won the inaugural Pride middleweight (205 lb) championship when he defeated Sakuraba for the second time. Sakuraba suffered a broken clavicle and was forced to withdraw after the first round, giving Silva a TKO win via doctor's stoppage. The two fought for a third time on 10 August 2003 at Pride Total Elimination 2003, part of the PRIDE Middleweight Tournament. Silva knocked out Sakuraba with a two punch combination at 5:01 into the first round.

Silva faced Quinton "Rampage" Jackson at Pride Final Conflict 2003 on 9 November 2003. Silva won by TKO after delivering seventeen consecutive knees to Jackson. Silva became Pride's 2003 tournament champion with the win. The two fought again on 31 October 2004 at Pride 28: High Octane. Jackson knocked Silva down near the end of the first round and mounted him as the bell rang. In round two Silva caught Jackson with a counter right hand and followed up with knees from the thai clinch knocking Jackson out, successfully defending the Pride middleweight championship with the win. In Japan, Silva additionally gained his reputation as a fighter who has never been defeated by any Japanese opponent, resulting in a trend of various Japanese fighters being arranged by Pride to face him.

Silva's undefeated 5-year streak (18 wins, 13 knockouts) in PRIDE was broken by Samoan Heavyweight Mark Hunt, a K-1 champion on 31 December 2004 at the Pride Shockwave 2004 event. Hunt won the non-title match by split decision. The decision was controversial because some who felt that Hunt's weight of 280 lb (125 kg), over 80 lb more than Silva, as well as Silva's performance in rounds two and three, had not been sufficiently considered by the judges in their decision; Randy Couture and Bas Rutten, both being commentators at the event, expressed disagreement with the judges decision. Silva also took this fight on two days notice. Nonetheless, Silva's 2004 campaign earned him Fighter of the Year honors from both Sherdog and the Wrestling Observer Newsletter.

Silva's former status as PRIDE Middleweight Champion first came under debate and criticism with his loss to Ricardo Arona (who subsequently lost the tournament to Silva's teammate, Mauricio "Shogun" Rua) on 28 August 2005 at Pride Final Conflict 2005. The loss, by unanimous decision in the tournament's semi-finals, was Silva's first defeat in a middleweight match in Pride; however, since it was not a title fight and held under special rules due to the grand prix format (2 rounds instead of 3), Silva was still recognized as the middleweight champion.

A rematch between Arona and Silva was scheduled to take place at the Pride Shockwave 2005 event on 31 December 2005. Mere minutes before the fight, Silva's teammate Cristiano Marcello had choked Charles Bennett unconscious in the locker room after a confrontation. Waking up, Bennett struck Silva with an elbow strike knocking him down unconscious. Despite the incident, Silva went on to win the fight by split decision.

On 18 May 2006, Pride's parent company, Dream Stage Entertainment (DSE), announced that Silva would replace Pride heavyweight champion Fedor Emelianenko in the Open Weight Grand Prix. Emelianenko's doctors stated that his hand, which had recently undergone surgery, would not be in good enough shape to fight because the metal implant would still be present. Because Silva was also a champion, he received a first round bye and fought in the second round at Pride Critical Countdown Absolute, which took place on 1 July 2006. Silva moved to the semi-finals of the Open Weight Grand Prix after defeating Kazuyuki Fujita by TKO (punches and soccer kicks) at 9:21 of round one.

On 8 July 2006, at UFC 61: Bitter Rivals, UFC president Dana White announced Silva would face Chuck Liddell in a UFC event held in November, provided Liddell beat Renato "Babalu" Sobral at UFC 62. Liddell did end up winning that fight. However, talks dwindled and the fight as advertised did not happen.

On 10 September 2006, at Pride Final Conflict Absolute, Wanderlei Silva was knocked out by Mirko Cro Cop in their rematch during the Heavyweight Grand Prix semi-finals. After a brief stoppage to tend to a swollen eye on Silva, "Cro Cop" struck Silva in the head with a left kick, knocking him out. On 21 October 2006 at Pride 32: The Real Deal, Wanderlei issued his challenge to Chuck Liddell to a fight inside a Pride ring in February, when the promotion returned to Las Vegas, however Dana White stated that the fight would not be happening, citing Silva's recent KO loss to Mirko Cro Cop which would have not allowed the NSAC to clear him medically for the fight that soon after being knocked out.

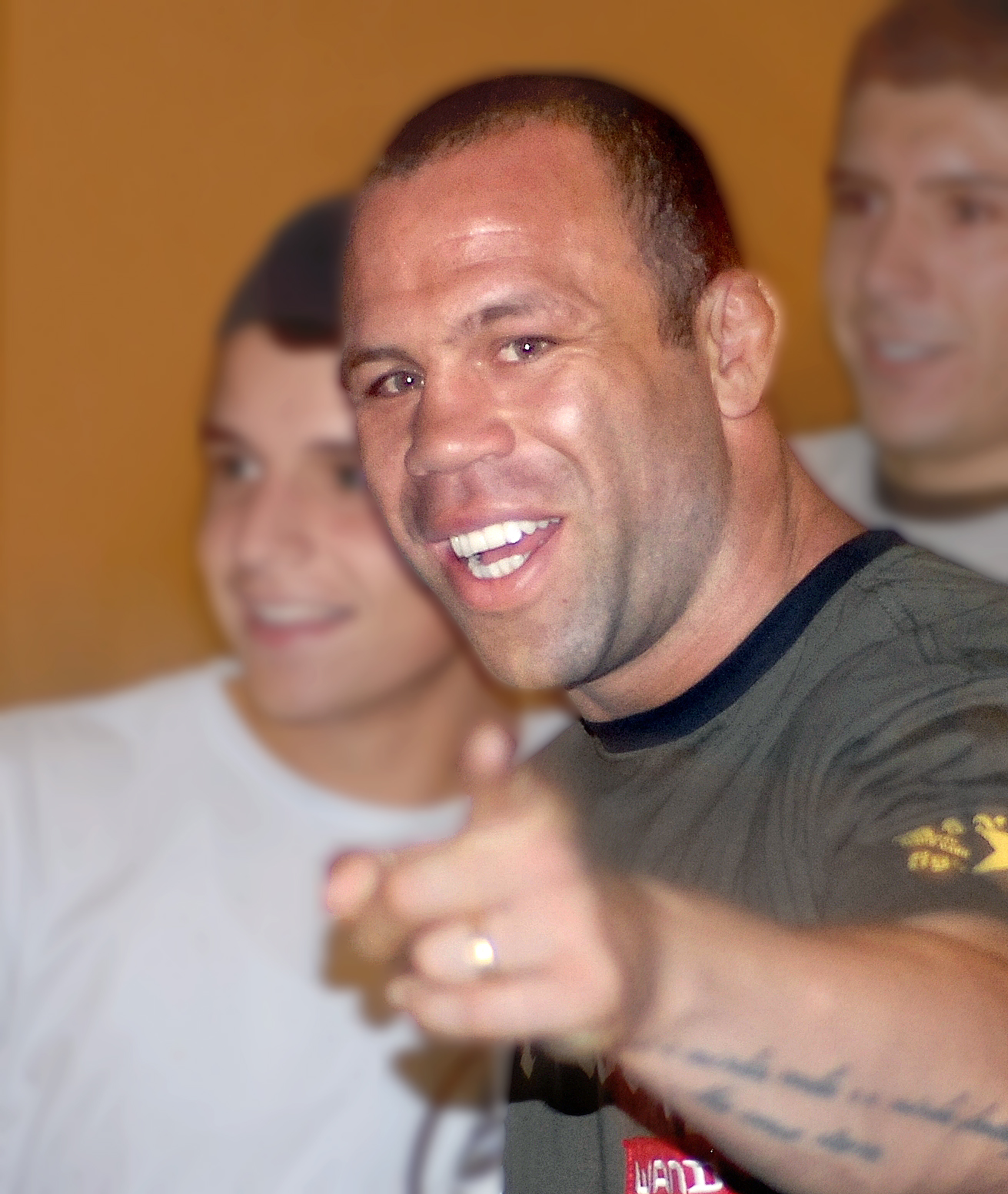
Wanderlei Silva in 2007.

Silva put his Pride middleweight title on the line against Dan Henderson, Pride's welterweight (183 lb) champion at Pride 33: The Second Coming, held on 24 February 2007, in Las Vegas, Nevada. In a night of upsets, Henderson knocked out Silva in the third round with a left hook to become the new middleweight champion. Silva was denied the ability to participate in Pride 34 due to medical suspension by the Nevada State Athletic Commission (NSAC) which made this his last Pride appearance. Silva almost never lost under strict Pride rules at 205 pounds - he won over 83% of his matches.

=== Return to the UFC ===
I fight for my fans and they know I give my best. Every time I need to give a good show for them because tickets are so expensive and pay-per-view is so expensive. The fans know which fighters want to give a show. I love my fans and fight for my fans. It's so incredible that I'm from Brazil but when I fight American fighters the crowd is much more for me over the American fighters. They know I'm going to put on a show.

— Wanderlei Silva talking about fighting in America and his motivation for fights.

On 17 August 2007, the UFC announced that they had signed Wanderlei Silva to compete in the organization and that he would return to the Octagon on 29 December 2007 at UFC 79. After months of speculation about Silva's opponent, UFC President Dana White announced that Chuck Liddell would be Silva's opponent for his return match. The long-awaited match happened on 29 December 2007 at UFC 79 with Silva losing to Liddell by unanimous decision. After the fight Silva said, "Win or lose I like to give the emotion for my fans" He also added that he gave his best and promised that next time he will deliver a win. This fight earned them the Fight of the Night award.

Keeping to his promise, on 24 May 2008 at UFC 84 in Las Vegas, he earned a decisive KO win against Keith Jardine at the 36-second mark of the first round, earning him a $75,000 Knockout of the Night bonus award. When Jardine threw a kick, Silva countered with a right-left-right combo that dropped him. Silva then finished the fight with ground strikes to earn the knockout.

At UFC 92, Wanderlei fought Quinton Jackson, who he had beaten twice previously in PRIDE. Jackson avenged his previous defeats by knocking Silva out with a left hook in the first round. Following the fight, Silva indicated that he would like to face Jackson again in the future.

Silva faced Rich Franklin at UFC 99 at a catchweight bout of 195 lb. After a hard-fought match on both sides, Silva lost via unanimous decision to Franklin. This fight earned him a $60,000 Fight of the Night award. During the second round, Silva rocked Franklin hard with punches and almost finished the fight during that moment. This was counterbalanced by Franklin dropping Silva three times in that round, each time with singular strikes. Silva then announced he would be out of action until 2010, as he underwent facial surgery to repair his nose (which was broken during Silva's second fight with Cro Cop, and then repeatedly broken again in later matches) and remove some scar tissue from above his eyes to avoid bleeding and being easily cut open during future fights. The surgery allowed him to breathe through a once completely blocked nose thus increasing his oxygen intake by 30% by doctor's estimates. At UFC 110, announcer Joe Rogan emphatically stated that Wanderlei looked like a totally different person in the wake of his recent facial reconstructive surgery.

Silva made his middleweight (185 lb) debut during UFC 110 against Michael Bisping on 21 February 2010. During the fight Bisping was able to take Silva down several times during the first round, however Wanderlei came back with a flurry of punches at the end of the first round, a tight guillotine choke in the second, and a right hook that dropped Bisping in the third. After three rounds of fighting, Silva was awarded the unanimous decision victory (29–28, 29–28, and 29–28) and his first victory in almost two years. Although winning only one of his previous 6 bouts, he was slightly favored going into the fight as it was widely speculated that Bisping was apprehensive to fight toe-to-toe after being viciously knocked out by Dan Henderson on 11 July 2009 in UFC 100. After the fight, an emotional Silva told the audience, "In your life you have bad moments. Everybody has bad moments, but if you believe in God and working hard, good moments they’ll come". Silva attributed his success to working with his previous trainer Raphael Cordeiro. Bisping added, "Wanderlei's a great opponent ... I felt the reason he got the decision was the knockdown right at the end".

Silva was expected to face former K-1 HERO'S Light heavyweight Champion Yoshihiro Akiyama at UFC 116. However, on 22 June, Silva had to pull out due to breaking three ribs during training. Akiyama would instead be fighting on the card, against Chris Leben. After Leben defeated Akiyama with a triangle choke in the third round Leben verbally called out Silva saying "Come on Wanderlei, I'll take you out too" in his post fight interview. "He represented very well, he's a good opponent," said Silva of "The Crippler." "I think if he's gonna wait that I'm gonna fight him next however Dana White has not considered a Silva/Leben fight happening anytime soon."

Silva underwent knee surgery in late July 2010 and his doctors had stated that he would need to wait at least 4 months before returning to training. This meant that he would not be seen fighting in the octagon again until early 2011.

Silva was scheduled to face Brian Stann at UFC 130. However, after Silva voiced his reluctance to face Stann, he was replaced on the card by returning UFC veteran Jorge Santiago.

On 4 April 2011, the UFC announced that Silva's next opponent would be Chris Leben with the two scheduled to meet at UFC 132. on 2 July 2011. During the fight's first round Leben won by KO with several uppercuts before following Silva to the ground for a referees stoppage at the 27 second mark. When Dana White was asked about his thoughts on Wanderlei's possible retirement, he said he felt it would be the best time for Wanderlei to retire but in the end it is up to whether Wanderlei himself would like to fight again.

Silva would fight again after replacing an injured Vitor Belfort against former Strikeforce Middleweight champion Cung Le at UFC 139. Le managed to confuse Silva with his unorthodox kicks, and landed a spinning backfist that dropped Silva. During the second round, Silva managed to shake Le with huge punches and knees that completely broke Le's nose. Le was stunned, bloody and fell to the ground, and the fight was stopped by the referee. This fight earned them a $70,000 Fight of the Night award. Afterwards in the press conference, Dana White commented that it was a good stoppage and that Cung was taken to the hospital.

Silva and Vitor Belfort coached The Ultimate Fighter: Brazil A rematch with Belfort was expected to take place on 23 June 2012 at UFC 147 but due to a broken hand Vitor Belfort had to withdraw from the match.

Silva faced Rich Franklin in a 190 lb catchweight at the event. Franklin and Silva fought once before at UFC 99, where Franklin won via unanimous decision. Despite Silva nearly finishing Franklin in the second round, the result was the same when the pair met for a second time at UFC 147, where Franklin again won by unanimous decision 49–46. This fight earned them a $65,000 Fight of the Night award.

In an interview with Sherdog asking about his future, Silva said: "I want to either fight a catchweight bout at 198 pounds (90 kg) or at light heavyweight. At middleweight, I'm very hungry (laughs). Right now, I'm doing weight training and some shadow boxing. I'm kind of on vacation now, paying attention to the family, but next year the Wand is back."

Silva faced Brian Stann in a Light heavyweight bout on 3 March 2013 at UFC on Fuel TV 8. The fight was notable as it was Silva's return to the Saitama Super Arena, where Pride FC ran the majority of its shows. Silva defeated Stann via KO in the second round in a bout that featured back and forth action, and earned both participants Fight of the Night honors. This fight also earned him the Knockout of the Night award totalling his bonus earnings to $100,000 for this fight.

On 22 October 2013, it was announced that Silva will be coaching The Ultimate Fighter: Brazil 3, against long-time rival Chael Sonnen. A bout with Sonnen, briefly attached to UFC 173, then at The Ultimate Fighter: Brazil 3 Finale, was expected to take place on 5 July 2014 at UFC 175. Dana White later stated the fight had to be moved back when Silva injured his hand and back during a brawl with Sonnen that took place during filming of the show. Silva was ultimately pulled from the fight entirely after he failed to submit an application to fight in the state of Nevada, as well as his refusal to undergo a random drug test and was replaced by Vitor Belfort. On 10 June 2014, it was later reported that Chael Sonnen failed a drug test and would not be allowed to fight on UFC 175 card, as a result of the failed drug test, Sonnen announced his retirement from the sport the following day. As a result of his refusal to submit to the drug tests, Silva was given a lifetime ban and a $70,000 fine by the Nevada State Athletic Commission at their meeting on 23 September 2014.

In May 2015, judge Kerry Earley overturned the lifetime ban that was imposed on Wanderlei Silva by the Nevada State Athletic Commission.

In January 2016, following an apology to the UFC about their "fight-fixed" [a.k.a. fight fixing] and retracting his statement, he was released from his UFC contract. This allowed him to do whatever he wanted with his career.

=== Rizin FF ===
Subsequent to his ban, Silva competed in a tag team grappling match with Kiyoshi Tamura against former opponent Kazushi Sakuraba and Hideo Tokoro at an event on 17 April 2016 for startup regional promotion Rizin Fighting Federation. The official result of the match was deemed a draw.

In July 2016, it was announced that Silva would return to mixed martial arts competition in Japan as part of Rizin's 16-man openweight tournament beginning 25 September 2016 in Tokyo. Silva was scheduled to face Mirko Cro Cop in a trilogy bout on 29 December in the Rizin Open Weight quarter finals. However, on 2 December, Silva withdrew from the bout citing injury.

=== Bellator MMA ===
In early March 2016, Bellator MMA announced that Silva had signed a multi-fight contract with the organization. The previous lifetime ban handed down by the Nevada State Athletic Commission was reduced to a three-year suspension retroactive to 24 May 2014. He was eligible for reinstatement beginning 25 May 2017. The ban would not prevent Silva from competing at Indian Casinos or in Japan.

After four years away from the sport, Silva made his delayed Bellator debut against Chael Sonnen in the main event at Bellator NYC on 24 June 2017. Silva lost a unanimous decision.

On 25 June 2018, Bellator MMA announced that Silva would face Rampage Jackson in a fourth match on 29 September 2018 at Bellator 206. He lost the fight via technical knockout in round two.

On 29 September 2019, news surfaced that Silva's contract with Bellator had expired.

On September 1, 2022, Silva officially announced his retirement from MMA, expressing interest in boxing, calling out Dan Henderson.

==== Global Fight League ====
On December 11, 2024, it was announced that Silva was eligible to be drafted in the Global Fight League. However, despite not having been drafted for the 2025 season, Silva was scheduled to be the manager for the Los Angeles GFL team. However, all GFL events were postponed indefinitely.

== Fighting style ==
Silva was famous for his brawling, relentless style of Muay Thai, which was described as being "feral" and carrying "a terrifying ferocity". His main strength was his offensive striking and use of hooks, soccer kicks and stomps. Silva was also willing to absorb counters in order to continue landing his own hits. He was also dangerous in the clinch, utilizing an onslaught of short hooks and knee strikes. Silva was also known for his use of headbutts when the rules allowed. Though his grappling expertise was initially considered inferior to his striking skills due to his preference for ground and pound, he had a refined Brazilian jiu-jitsu transitional game.

== Personal life ==
Silva and his wife have a son, Thor. He has a daughter from a previous relationship.

On 26 August 2012 Silva's father, Holando Pinheiro da Silva, died in a car accident in Brazil.

In April 2016, Silva became an American citizen.

After years of living in the United States, Silva moved back to his hometown, Curitiba in Brazil.

In 2018, Silva admitted that he has been bearing symptoms consistent with chronic traumatic encephalopathy, and has expressed a wish to donate his brain for research.

Wanderlei Silva ran for federal deputy representing Paraná for the PSD in the 2018 elections, in which he obtained 13,755 votes, not being elected. He attempted to run for a second time in the 2022 elections for Progressistas.

On 8 October 2020, Sem Coleira, a Portuguese biography book about Silva was published.

== Wand Fight Team ==
Wand Fight Team is a mixed martial arts training organization headed by Wanderlei Silva. It was founded in 2009 in Las Vegas, with a former franchise in Pensacola, Florida.

The Las Vegas location features several famous MMA Instructors, including, Leandro Lorenco (BJJ), Michael Costa (Muay Thai & MMA), Pete Martin (Kids Wrestling & Fitness) and Erik Perez (Fitness).

== Championships and accomplishments ==
=== Mixed martial arts ===
- Ultimate Fighting Championship
  - UFC Hall of Fame (Pioneer Wing, Class of 2024)
  - Fight of the Night (Five times) vs. Chuck Liddell, Rich Franklin 1, Cung Le, Rich Franklin 2, and Brian Stann
  - Knockout of the Night (Two times) vs. Keith Jardine and Brian Stann
  - UFC Encyclopedia Awards
    - Fight of the Night (One time) vs. Tito Ortiz
    - Knockout of the Night (One time) vs. Tony Petarra
  - Most knockouts in Zuffa, LLC (UFC, Pride, WEC, Strikeforce) history (19)
  - Most knockdowns in Zuffa, LLC (UFC, Pride, WEC, Strikeforce) history (27)
  - Tied (Donald Cerrone & Jim Miller) for third most finishes in Zuffa, LLC (UFC, Pride, WEC, Strikeforce) history (20) (behind Mirko Cro Cop & Charles Oliveira)
  - Third most wins in Zuffa, LLC (UFC, Pride, WEC, Strikeforce) history (27) (behind Donald Cerrone & Jim Miller)
  - UFC.com Awards
    - 2007: Ranked #3 Fight of the Year vs. Chuck Liddell
    - 2008: Ranked #7 Knockout of the Year vs. Keith Jardine
    - 2009: Ranked #6 Loss of the Year vs. Rich Franklin 1 & Ranked #4 Fight of the Year vs. Rich Franklin 1
    - 2011: Ranked #10 Knockout of the Year vs. Cung Le (Tied with Anthony Johnson), Ranked #9 Upset of the Year vs. Cung Le & Ranked #8 Fight of the Year vs. Cung Le
    - 2013: Ranked #8 Knockout of the Year & Ranked #2 Fight of the Year vs. Brian Stann
- Pride Fighting Championships
  - Pride Middleweight Championship (One time, first)
    - Four successful title defenses
      - Most successful title defenses in PRIDE FC history (4)
      - Most successful title defenses in the history of PRIDE FC Middleweight division (4)
      - Most consecutive successful titles defenses in PRIDE FC history (4)
      - Most consecutive successful title defenses in the history of PRIDE FC Middleweight division (4)
      - Longest title reign in PRIDE FC history (1939 days)
    - 2003 Pride Middleweight World Grand Prix Championship
    - 2005 Pride Middleweight World Grand Prix Semi-finalist
    - 2006 Pride Openweight World Grand Prix Semi-finalist
    - Saku Championship belt winner
    - First fighter in Pride Fighting Championships history to win a Pride Championship and Pride Grand Prix
  - Most wins in PRIDE FC history (22)
  - Longest undefeated streak in PRIDE FC history (20)
  - Most knockouts in PRIDE FC history (15)
  - Most knockdowns landed in PRIDE FC history (18)
  - Tied (Mirko Cro Cop) for most finishes in PRIDE FC history (16)
  - Most bouts in PRIDE FC history (28)
  - Fourth most total fight time in PRIDE FC history (4 hours 40 mins)
  - Most significant strikes in PRIDE FC history (720)
- International Vale Tudo Championship
  - IVC Light heavyweight Championship (One time)
- FanSided
  - 2000s #9 Ranked MMA Fighter of the Decade
- Wrestling Observer Newsletter
  - 2001 Feud of the Year vs. Kazushi Sakuraba
  - 2001 Most Outstanding Fighter
  - 2003 Fight of the Year vs. Hidehiko Yoshida on 9 November
  - 2004 Fight of the Year vs. Quinton Jackson on 31 October
  - 2004 Most Outstanding Fighter
- Sports Illustrated
  - 2004 Knockout of the Decade vs. Quinton Jackson on 31 October 2004
- MMA Fighting
  - 2004 Light heavyweight of the Year
  - 2004 Fight of the Year vs. Quinton Jackson 2 at Pride 28
  - 2008 #3 Ranked UFC Knockout of the Year vs. Keith Jardine at UFC 84
  - 2013 Best Fight of the Half-Year vs. Brian Stann
- Sherdog
  - 2004 Fighter of the Year
  - Mixed Martial Arts Hall of Fame
- World MMA Awards
  - 2008 Fight of the Year vs. Chuck Liddell at UFC 79
  - 2008 Knockout of the Year vs. Keith Jardine at UFC 84
  - 2018 Lifetime Achievement
- Yahoo Sports
  - 2007 Fight of the Year vs. Chuck Liddell at UFC 79

== Mixed martial arts record ==
Professional record breakdown
51 matches	35 wins	14 losses
By knockout	27	7
By submission	1	0
By decision	7	7
Draws	1	
No contests	1	

Res.	Record	Opponent	Method	Event	Date	Round	Time	Location	Notes
Loss	35–14–1 (1)	Quinton Jackson	TKO (punches)	Bellator 206	29 September 2018	2	4:32	San Jose, California, United States	Heavyweight bout.
Loss	35–13–1 (1)	Chael Sonnen	Decision (unanimous)	Bellator NYC	24 June 2017	3	5:00	New York City, New York, United States	
Win	35–12–1 (1)	Brian Stann	KO (punches)	UFC on Fuel TV: Silva vs. Stann	3 March 2013	2	4:08	Saitama, Japan	Return to Light Heavyweight. Fight of the Night. Knockout of the Night.
Loss	34–12–1 (1)	Rich Franklin	Decision (unanimous)	UFC 147	23 June 2012	5	5:00	Belo Horizonte, Brazil	Catchweight (190 lb) bout. Fight of the Night.
Win	34–11–1 (1)	Cung Le	TKO (knees and punches)	UFC 139	20 November 2011	2	4:49	San Jose, California, United States	Fight of the Night.
Loss	33–11–1 (1)	Chris Leben	KO (punches)	UFC 132	2 July 2011	1	0:27	Las Vegas, Nevada, United States	
Win	33–10–1 (1)	Michael Bisping	Decision (unanimous)	UFC 110	21 February 2010	3	5:00	Sydney, Australia	Middleweight debut.
Loss	32–10–1 (1)	Rich Franklin	Decision (unanimous)	UFC 99	13 June 2009	3	5:00	Cologne, Germany	Catchweight (195 lb) bout. Fight of the Night.
Loss	32–9–1 (1)	Quinton Jackson	KO (punch)	UFC 92	27 December 2008	1	3:21	Las Vegas, Nevada, United States	
Win	32–8–1 (1)	Keith Jardine	KO (punches)	UFC 84	24 May 2008	1	0:36	Las Vegas, Nevada, United States	Knockout of the Night. Knockout of the Year (2008).
Loss	31–8–1 (1)	Chuck Liddell	Decision (unanimous)	UFC 79	29 December 2007	3	5:00	Las Vegas, Nevada, United States	Fight of the Night. Fight of the Year (2008).
Loss	31–7–1 (1)	Dan Henderson	KO (punches)	Pride 33	24 February 2007	3	2:08	Las Vegas, Nevada, United States	Lost the Pride Middleweight Championship.
Loss	31–6–1 (1)	Mirko Cro Cop	KO (head kick)	Pride Final Conflict	10 September 2006	1	5:26	Saitama, Japan	2006 Pride Heavyweight Grand Prix Semifinal.
Win	31–5–1 (1)	Kazuyuki Fujita	TKO (punches and soccer kicks)	Pride Critical Countdown	1 July 2006	1	9:21	Saitama, Japan	2006 Pride Heavyweight Grand Prix Quarterfinal.
Win	30–5–1 (1)	Ricardo Arona	Decision (split)	Pride Shockwave 2005	31 December 2005	3	5:00	Saitama, Japan	Defended the Pride Middleweight Championship.
Loss	29–5–1 (1)	Ricardo Arona	Decision (unanimous)	Pride Final Conflict 2005	28 August 2005	2	5:00	Saitama, Japan	2005 Pride Middleweight Grand Prix Semifinal.
Win	29–4–1 (1)	Kazuhiro Nakamura	TKO (punches)	Pride Critical Countdown 2005	26 June 2005	1	5:24	Saitama, Japan	2005 Pride Middleweight Grand Prix Quarterfinal.
Win	28–4–1 (1)	Hidehiko Yoshida	Decision (split)	Pride Total Elimination 2005	23 April 2005	3	5:00	Osaka, Japan	2005 Pride Middleweight Grand Prix Opening Round.
Loss	27–4–1 (1)	Mark Hunt	Decision (split)	Pride Shockwave 2004	31 December 2004	3	5:00	Saitama, Japan	Openweight bout.
Win	27–3–1 (1)	Quinton Jackson	KO (knees)	Pride 28	31 October 2004	2	3:26	Saitama, Japan	Defended the Pride Middleweight Championship. Fight of the Year (2004).
Win	26–3–1 (1)	Yuki Kondo	KO (stomps)	Pride Final Conflict 2004	15 August 2004	1	2:46	Saitama, Japan	Non-title bout.
Win	25–3–1 (1)	Ikuhisa Minowa	KO (punches)	Pride Bushido 2	15 February 2004	1	1:09	Yokohama, Japan	Non-title bout.
Win	24–3–1 (1)	Quinton Jackson	TKO (knees)	Pride Final Conflict 2003	9 November 2003	1	6:28	Tokyo, Japan	Won the 2003 Pride Middleweight Grand Prix.
Win	23–3–1 (1)	Hidehiko Yoshida	Decision (unanimous)	Pride Final Conflict 2003	9 November 2003	2	5:00	Tokyo, Japan	2003 Pride Middleweight Grand Prix Semifinal. Fight of the Year (2003).
Win	22–3–1 (1)	Kazushi Sakuraba	KO (punch)	Pride Total Elimination 2003	10 August 2003	1	5:01	Saitama, Japan	2003 Pride Middleweight Grand Prix Opening Round.
Win	21–3–1 (1)	Hiromitsu Kanehara	TKO (corner stoppage)	Pride 23	24 November 2002	1	3:40	Tokyo, Japan	Defended the Pride Middleweight Championship.
Win	20–3–1 (1)	Tatsuya Iwasaki	TKO (head kick and punches)	Pride Shockwave	28 August 2002	1	1:16	Tokyo, Japan	Non-title bout.
Draw	19–3–1 (1)	Mirko Cro Cop	Draw (time limit)	Pride 20	28 April 2002	5	3:00	Yokohama, Japan	Heavyweight bout. Match fought under special rules.
Win	19–3 (1)	Kiyoshi Tamura	KO (punch)	Pride 19	24 February 2002	2	2:28	Saitama, Japan	Defended the Pride Middleweight Championship.
Win	18–3 (1)	Alexander Otsuka	TKO (doctor stoppage)	Pride 18	23 December 2001	3	2:02	Fukuoka, Japan	Non-title bout.
Win	17–3 (1)	Kazushi Sakuraba	TKO (doctor stoppage)	Pride 17	3 November 2001	1	10:00	Tokyo, Japan	Won the inaugural Pride Middleweight Championship.
Win	16–3 (1)	Shungo Oyama	TKO (punches)	Pride 14 - Clash of the Titans	27 May 2001	1	0:30	Yokohama, Japan	
Win	15–3 (1)	Kazushi Sakuraba	TKO (knees and soccer kicks)	Pride 13 - Collision Course	25 March 2001	1	1:38	Saitama, Japan	
Win	14–3 (1)	Dan Henderson	Decision (unanimous)	Pride 12 - Cold Fury	23 December 2000	2	10:00	Saitama, Japan	Return to Light Heavyweight.
NC	13–3 (1)	Gilbert Yvel	NC (Yvel kicked in groin)	Pride 11 - Battle of the Rising Sun	31 October 2000	1	0:21	Osaka, Japan	Heavyweight debut. An inadvertent groin kick from Silva rendered Yvel unable to continue.
Win	13–3	Guy Mezger	KO (punches)	Pride 10 - Return of the Warriors	27 August 2000	1	3:45	Saitama, Japan	
Win	12–3	Todd Medina	KO (knees)	Meca Vale Tudo 2	12 August 2000	1	0:39	Curitiba, Brazil	
Loss	11–3	Tito Ortiz	Decision (unanimous)	UFC 25	14 April 2000	5	5:00	Tokyo, Japan	For the vacant UFC Light Heavyweight Championship.
Win	11–2	Bob Schrijber	Submission (rear-naked choke)	Pride Grand Prix 1st Round	30 January 2000	1	2:42	Tokyo, Japan	
Win	10–2	Daijiro Matsui	Decision (unanimous)	Pride 8	21 November 1999	2	10:00	Tokyo, Japan	
Win	9–2	Carl Malenko	Decision (unanimous)	Pride 7	12 September 1999	2	10:00	Yokohama, Japan	
Win	8–2	Tony Petarra	KO (knee)	UFC 20	7 May 1999	1	2:53	Birmingham, Alabama, United States	
Win	7–2	Eugene Jackson	TKO (submission to punches)	IVC 10: World Class Champions	27 April 1999	1	0:32	Brazil	Won the IVC Light Heavyweight Championship.
Win	6–2	Adrian Serrano	KO (punches and soccer kick)	IVC 9: The Revenge	20 January 1999	1	0:22	Aracaju, Brazil	
Loss	5–2	Vitor Belfort	TKO (punches)	UFC Brazil	16 October 1998	1	0:44	São Paulo, Brazil	
Win	5–1	Mike van Arsdale	KO (punch and soccer kick)	IVC 6: The Challenge	23 August 1998	1	4:00	São Paulo, Brazil	
Loss	4–1	Artur Mariano	TKO (doctor stoppage)	IVC 2: A Question of Pride	15 September 1997	1	13:10	São Paulo, Brazil	
Win	4–0	Egidio da Costa	TKO (submission to punches)	IVC 2: A Question of Pride	15 September 1997	1	2:27	São Paulo, Brazil	
Win	3–0	Sean Bormet	KO (kick)	IVC 2: A Question of Pride	15 September 1997	1	1:19	São Paulo, Brazil	
Win	2–0	Marcelao Barbosa	TKO (shoulder injury)	Brazilian Vale Tudo 10	1 July 1997	1	0:20	Brazil	
Win	1–0	Dilson Filho	KO (punch)	Brazilian Vale Tudo 6	1 November 1996	1	3:35	Brazil	

No.	Event	Fight	Venue	City	PPV Buys
1.	UFC 99	Franklin vs. Silva	Lanxess Arena	Cologne, Germany	365,000
2.	UFC 147	Silva vs. Franklin II	Mineirinho Arena	Belo Horizonte, Brazil	175,000
3.	Bellator NYC	Sonnen vs. Silva	Madison Square Garden	New York City	95,000

== Exhibition boxing record ==
1 fight	0 wins	1 loss
By disqualification	0	1

No.	Result	Record	Opponent	Type	Round, time	Date	Location	Notes
1	Loss	0–1	Acelino Freitas	DQ	4 (8), 1:34	27 Sep 2025	São Paulo, Brazil	Ruled loss for Silva by DQ for repeated fouls, including headbutts.

== Submission grappling record ==
Result	Opponent	Method	Event	Date	Round	Time	Notes
Draw	(Japan) Kazushi Sakuraba and (Japan) Hideo Tokoro	Draw	Rizin FF 1	2016	1	15:00	Partnered with (Japan) Kiyoshi Tamura.

== Filmography ==
Year	Title	Role	Notes
2005	Nagurimono	Morte	
2012	Here Comes the Boom	Himself	
2018	Kickboxer: Retaliation	Chud	

== Pay-per-view Bouts ==
No	Event	PPV buys
1.	UFC 99	360,000
2.	UFC 147	140,000
3.	Bellator 180	130,000
	Total:	630,000

== Books ==
- Wanderlei Silva - Sem Coleira, BB Editora (8 October 2020), ISBN 978-85-62716-85-0

Achievements
New championship	1st Pride Middleweight Champion; 3 November 2001 – 24 February 2007	Succeeded by Dan Henderson
New championship	Pride FC Middleweight Tournament winner 9 November 2003	Succeeded by Mauricio "Shogun" Rua
New championship	IVC Light-Heavyweight Champion; 27 April 1999	
