= List of Pride Fighting Championships champions =

Below is a list of Pride Fighting Championships champions and title defenses:

== World champions ==
=== Heavyweight Championship ===
Weight limit: Over 93 kg (205 lb)

No.	Name	Event	Date	Reign	Defenses
1	(Brazil) Antônio Rodrigo Nogueira def. Heath Herring	Pride 17; Tokyo, Japan	Nov 3, 2001	498 days	
2	(Russia) Fedor Emelianenko	Pride 25; Yokohama, Japan	Mar 16, 2003	1,663 days	NC vs. interim champion Antônio Rodrigo Nogueira at Pride Final Conflict 2004 on Aug 15, 2004; 1. def. interim champion Antônio Rodrigo Nogueira at Pride Shockwave 2004 on Dec 31, 2004; 2. def. Mirko Cro Cop at Pride Final Conflict 2005 on Aug 28, 2005; 3. def. Mark Hunt at Pride Shockwave 2006 on Dec 31, 2006
-	(Brazil) Antônio Rodrigo Nogueira def. Mirko Cro Cop for interim title	Pride Final Conflict 2003; Tokyo, Japan	Nov 9, 2003	-	

=== Middleweight Championship ===
Weight limit: 83 kg (183 lb) to 93 kg (205 lb)

No.	Name	Event	Date	Reign	Defenses
1	(Brazil) Wanderlei Silva def. Kazushi Sakuraba	Pride 17; Tokyo, Japan	Nov 3, 2001	1,939 days	1. def. Kiyoshi Tamura at Pride 19 on Feb 24, 2002l 2. def. Hiromitsu Kanehara at Pride 23 on Nov 24, 2002; 3. def. Quinton Jackson at Pride 28 on Oct 31, 2004; 4. def. Ricardo Arona at Pride Shockwave 2005 on Dec 31, 2005
2	(United States) Dan Henderson	Pride 33; Las Vegas, NV, U.S.	Feb 24, 2007	196 days	
The Pride World Middleweight Title was unified with the UFC Light Heavyweight Championship on September 8, 2007 when Quinton Jackson defeated Dan Henderson at UFC 75.

=== Welterweight Championship ===
Weight limit: 73 kg (161 lb) to 83 kg (183 lb)

No.	Name	Event	Date	Reign	Defenses
1	(United States) Dan Henderson def. Murilo Bustamante	Pride Shockwave 2005; Saitama, Japan	Dec 31, 2005	791 days	
The Pride World Welterweight Title was unified with the UFC Middleweight Championship on March 1, 2008 when Anderson Silva defeated Dan Henderson at UFC 82.

=== Lightweight Championship ===
Weight limit: Below 73 kg (161 lb)

No.	Name	Event	Date	Reign	Defenses
1	(Japan) Takanori Gomi def. Hayato Sakurai	Pride Shockwave 2005; Saitama, Japan	Dec 31, 2005	642 days	1. def. Marcus Aurelio at Pride Bushido 13 on Nov 5, 2006

== Grand Prix Winners ==
An asterisk (*) indicates that the tournament was also a title fight.

Event	Division	Winner	Runner-up	Final
Pride Grand Prix 2000 Opening Round Pride Grand Prix 2000 Finals	Openweight	(United States) Mark Coleman	(Ukraine) Igor Vovchanchyn	May 1, 2000
Pride Total Elimination 2003 Pride Final Conflict 2003	Middleweight	(Brazil) Wanderlei Silva	(United States) Quinton Jackson	November 9, 2003
Pride Total Elimination 2004 Pride Critical Countdown 2004 Pride Final Conflict 2004 Pride Shockwave 2004	Heavyweight	(Russia) Fedor Emelianenko *	(Brazil) Antônio Rodrigo Nogueira	December 31, 2004
Pride Total Elimination 2005 Pride Critical Countdown 2005 Pride Final Conflict 2005	Middleweight	(Brazil) Mauricio Rua	(Brazil) Ricardo Arona	August 28, 2005
Pride Bushido 9 Pride Shockwave 2005	Welterweight	(United States) Dan Henderson *	(Brazil) Murilo Bustamante	December 31, 2005
Pride Bushido 9 Pride Shockwave 2005	Lightweight	(Japan) Takanori Gomi *	(Japan) Hayato Sakurai	December 31, 2005
Pride Total Elimination Absolute Pride Critical Countdown Absolute Pride Final Conflict Absolute	Openweight	(Croatia) Mirko Filipović	(United States) Josh Barnett	September 10, 2006
Pride Bushido 11 Pride Bushido 12 Pride Bushido 13	Welterweight	(Japan) Kazuo Misaki	(Canada) Denis Kang	November 5, 2006

== Records ==
=== Most wins in title bouts ===
Victories	Champion	Division	V	D	NC	L
5	(Brazil) Wanderlei Silva	Middleweight	5	0	0	1
4	(Russia) Fedor Emelianenko	Heavyweight	4	0	0	0
2	(Brazil) Antônio Rodrigo Nogueira	Heavyweight	2	0	0	2
2	(Japan) Takanori Gomi	Lightweight	2	0	0	0
2	(United States) Dan Henderson	Middleweight; Welterweight	1; 1	0; 0	0; 0	0; 0

=== Most consecutive title defenses ===
Defenses	Champion	Division	Period
4	(Brazil) Wanderlei Silva	Middleweight	November 3, 2001 – February 24, 2007
3	(Russia) Fedor Emelianenko	Heavyweight	March 16, 2003 – October 4, 2007
1	(Japan) Takanori Gomi	Lightweight	December 31, 2005 – October 4, 2007

=== Multi-division champions ===
Interim title

No.	Champion	Division	Won	Lost	Defenses	Reign	Total reign
1	(United States) Dan Henderson	Middleweight	February 24, 2007 (Pride 33)	September 8, 2007 (UFC 75)	0	196 days	987 days
1	(United States) Dan Henderson	Welterweight	December 31, 2005 (Pride Shockwave 2005)	March 1, 2008 (UFC 82)	0	791 days	987 days

=== Simultaneous two division champions ===
This table, different from the previous one, only counts the periods in which the fighter loaded the titles simultaneously and the defenses in that period of time.

No.	Champion	Division	Span	Defenses	Simultaneous Reign
1	(United States) Dan Henderson	Middleweight	February 24, 2007 – September 8, 2007	0	196 days
1	(United States) Dan Henderson	Welterweight	February 24, 2007 – September 8, 2007	0	196 days

== Champions by nationality ==
The division champions include only linear and true champions. Interim champions who have never become linear champions will be listed as interim champions. Fighters with multiple title reigns in a specific division will also be counted once. Runners-up are not included in tournaments champions.

Country	Division champions	Interim champions	Tournaments champions	Total
Brazil	2	1	2	4
United States	2	-	2	4
Japan	1	-	2	3
Russia	1	-	1	2
Croatia	-	-	1	1

== See also ==
- List of Pride events
- List of Pride FC fighters
- List of current mixed martial arts champions
- List of Bellator MMA champions
- List of EliteXC champions
- List of Invicta FC champions
- List of ONE Championship champions
- List of PFL champions
- List of Strikeforce champions
- List of UFC champions
- List of WEC champions
- Mixed martial arts weight classes
