= List of WEC bonus award recipients =

WEC Bonus Awards are three separate cash bonuses usually awarded to four fighters after each WEC event, based on internal decision by WEC management. More/fewer bonuses have been awarded at some events, especially when no knockouts or submissions occurred.

- Fight of the Night is awarded to the two fighters who delivered the most impressive fight on the card.
- Knockout of the Night is awarded to the fighter with the most impressive knockout/technical knockout.
- Submission of the Night is awarded to the fighter with the most impressive submission.

== Fighters With the Most Awards ==
| Most All Time |

| Fighter | Fight of the Night | Knockout of the Night | Submission of the Night | Total |
|---|---|---|---|---|
| Urijah Faber | 3 | 1 | 4 | 8 |
| Donald Cerrone | 5 | 0 | 0 | 5 |
| Miguel Torres | 2 | 0 | 3 | 5 |
| Rani Yahya | 1 | 0 | 4 | 5 |
| Cub Swanson | 4 | 0 | 0 | 4 |
| Brian Bowles | 0 | 2 | 2 | 4 |
| Leonard Garcia | 2 | 1 | 0 | 3 |
| Rob McCullough | 2 | 1 | 0 | 3 |
| Jamie Varner | 2 | 1 | 0 | 3 |
| Carlos Condit | 2 | 0 | 1 | 3 |
| Benson Henderson | 2 | 0 | 1 | 3 |
| Anthony Pettis | 1 | 1 | 1 | 3 |
| Mike Brown | 1 | 1 | 1 | 3 |
| Anthony Njokuani | 0 | 3 | 0 | 3 |
| José Aldo | 0 | 3 | 0 | 3 |

== Award recipients ==
This list is based on the information available at fightmetric.com, the official Zuffa/WEC statistics provider.

| Event | Fight of the Night | | | Knockout of the Night | Submission of the Night | Bonus |
|---|---|---|---|---|---|---|
| WEC 53: Henderson vs. Pettis | Benson Henderson | vs. | Anthony Pettis | Eddie Wineland | Shane Roller | $10,000 |
| WEC 52: Faber vs. Mizugaki | Cub Swanson | vs. | Mackens Semerzier | Erik Koch | Urijah Faber | $10,000 |
| WEC 51: Aldo vs. Gamburyan | Donald Cerrone | vs. | Jamie Varner | George Roop | Miguel Torres | $10,000 |
| WEC 50: Cruz vs. Benavidez 2 | Scott Jorgensen | vs. | Brad Pickett | Maciej Jewtuszko | Anthony Pettis | $10,000 |
| WEC 49: Varner vs. Shalorus | Mark Hominick | vs. | Yves Jabouin | Eddie Wineland | Josh Grispi | $10,000 |
| WEC 48: Aldo vs. Faber | Leonard Garcia | vs. | Chan Sung Jung | Manvel Gamburyan | Benson Henderson | $65,000 |
| WEC 47: Bowles vs. Cruz | Leonard Garcia | vs. | George Roop | Anthony Pettis | Joseph Benavidez | $10,000 |
| WEC 46: Varner vs. Henderson | Coty Wheeler | vs. | Will Campuzano | —N/a | Urijah Faber | $10,000 |
| WEC 45: Cerrone vs. Ratcliff | Donald Cerrone | vs. | Ed Ratcliff | Anthony Njokuani | Brad Pickett | $10,000 each, except $5,000 Mizugaki, Jorgensen |
| WEC 45: Cerrone vs. Ratcliff | Takeya Mizugaki | vs. | Scott Jorgensen | Anthony Njokuani | Brad Pickett | $10,000 each, except $5,000 Mizugaki, Jorgensen |
| WEC 44: Brown vs. Aldo | Cub Swanson | vs. | John Franchi | José Aldo | Shane Roller | $10,000 |
| WEC 43: Cerrone vs. Henderson | Benson Henderson | vs. | Donald Cerrone | Anthony Njokuani | Mackens Semerzier | $20,000 each for FOTN; $10,000 for KOTN, SOTN |
| WEC 42: Torres vs. Bowles | Joseph Benavidez | vs. | Dominick Cruz | Brian Bowles | Rani Yahya | $10,000 |
| WEC 41: Brown vs. Faber 2 | Mike Brown | vs. | Urijah Faber | José Aldo | Seth Dikun | $10,000 |
| WEC 40: Torres vs. Mizugaki | Miguel Torres | vs. | Takeya Mizugaki | Anthony Njokuani | Rani Yahya | $10,000 |
| WEC 39: Brown vs. Garcia | Johny Hendricks | vs. | Alex Serdyukov | Mike Brown | Damacio Page | $7,500 |
| WEC 38: Varner vs. Cerrone | Jamie Varner | vs. | Donald Cerrone | José Aldo | Urijah Faber | $7,500 |
| WEC 37: Torres vs. Tapia | Cub Swanson | vs. | Hiroyuki Takaya | Bart Palaszewski | Brian Bowles | $7,500 |
| WEC 36: Faber vs. Brown | Donald Cerrone | vs. | Rob McCullough | Mike Brown | Rani Yahya | $7,500 |
| WEC 36: Faber vs. Brown | Donald Cerrone | vs. | Rob McCullough | Leonard Garcia | Rani Yahya | $7,500 |
| WEC 35: Condit vs. Miura | Carlos Condit | vs. | Hiromitsu Miura | Brock Larson | Brian Bowles | $7,500 |
| WEC 34: Faber vs. Pulver | Urijah Faber | vs. | Jens Pulver | Mark Muñoz | Tim McKenzie | |
| WEC 34: Faber vs. Pulver | Miguel Torres | vs. | Yoshiro Maeda | Mark Muñoz | Tim McKenzie | |
| WEC 33: Marshall vs. Stann | Richard Crunkilton | vs. | Sergio Gomez | Brian Stann | Marcus Hicks | |
| WEC 32: Condit vs. Prater | Coty Wheeler | vs. | Del Hawkins | Jamie Varner | Miguel Torres | |
| WEC 31: Faber vs. Curran | Urijah Faber | vs. | Jeff Curran | Brian Bowles | Jens Pulver | |
| WEC 30: McCullough vs. Crunkilton | Chase Beebe | vs. | Rani Yahya | Rob McCullough | Miguel Torres | |
| WEC 29: Condit vs. Larson | Eric Schambari | vs. | Logan Clark | Paulo Filho | Carlos Condit | |
| WEC 28: Faber vs. Farrar | Cub Swanson | vs. | Micah Miller | Brock Larson | Rani Yahya | |
| WEC 27: Marshall vs. McElfresh | Jason Miller | vs. | Hiromitsu Miura | Doug Marshall | Marcus Hicks | |
| WEC 26: Condit vs. Alessio | Carlos Condit | vs. | John Alessio | Charlie Valencia | Urijah Faber | |
| WEC 25: McCullough vs. Cope | Rob McCullough | vs. | Kit Cope | Urijah Faber | Richard Crunkilton | |

== See also ==
List of UFC bonus award recipients
