= UFC 133 =

UFC mixed martial arts event in 2011

UFC 133: Evans vs. Ortiz 2
- The poster for UFC 133: Evans vs. Ortiz 2
- Promotion: Ultimate Fighting Championship
- Date: August 6, 2011
- Venue: Wells Fargo Center
- City: Philadelphia, Pennsylvania
- Attendance: 11,583
- Total gate: $1,500,000
- Buyrate: 310,000

Event chronology
UFC 132: Cruz vs. Faber	UFC 133: Evans vs. Ortiz 2	UFC Live: Hardy vs. Lytle

UFC 133: Evans vs. Ortiz 2 was a mixed martial arts event held by the Ultimate Fighting Championship on August 6, 2011, at the Wells Fargo Center in Philadelphia, Pennsylvania, United States.

== Background ==
Multiple fighters that were expected to fight at this event suffered injuries. This led to multiple fights, including championship bouts being called off as a result.

This event was expected to feature Light Heavyweight Champion Jon Jones' first title defense against former Light Heavyweight Champion Rashad Evans, but a pre-existing injury in his right hand prevented Jones from fighting, and was expected to keep him sidelined until late 2011. Not willing to wait, Evans accepted a fight against Phil Davis at this event. However, Jones later found out that he would no longer require surgery and instead made his first title defense against Quinton Jackson on September 24, 2011, at UFC 135.

On July 12, Phil Davis pulled out of his main event bout with Rashad Evans due to a knee injury suffered during training. Tito Ortiz initially declined an offer to step in as Davis' replacement and Evans was then rumored to face Lyoto Machida in a rematch of their title bout at UFC 98. Machida's camp verbally accepted the fight, but when UFC President Dana White called Machida's camp again to confirm the fight, they said Machida would fight only if he received higher pay, which White declined. The organization briefly turned their attention to matching Evans with Vladimir Matyushenko, who was already scheduled to compete on the card. In the meanwhile, Ortiz had a change of heart and accepted the offer to replace Davis. The two previously met at UFC 73 where the bout ended in a Draw. The Evans/Davis bout was later rescheduled for UFC on Fox 2 on January 28, 2012.

Nick Pace was originally slated to take on Michael McDonald at this event, before McDonald was pulled to replace Norifumi Yamamoto for a UFC 130 bout with Chris Cariaso. Ivan Menjivar would later step in to face Pace at this event. At the official weigh ins on August 5, Menjivar could not make the 136 pound weight allowance cut off, and Pace subsequently agreed to fight Menjivar in a 138-pound catchweight bout.

A bout between Featherweight Champion José Aldo and Chad Mendes was previously linked to this event. However, Aldo was sidelined until October recovering from various injuries, while Mendes remained on the card and faced Rani Yahya. The Aldo/Mendes title fight would later take place at UFC 142 on January 14, 2012.

Riki Fukuda was scheduled to face Rafael Natal, but was forced out of the bout due to a knee injury sustained in a car accident and was replaced by Costas Philippou. However, Philippou was later pulled from this bout to replace Alessio Sakara in a bout with Jorge Rivera on this same card, and he was replaced by Paul Bradley.

Vladimir Matyushenko was originally scheduled to face Alexander Gustafsson at this event. Matyushenko, however, pulled out of the bout on July 13, 2011, due to an injury and was replaced by Matt Hamill. The Matyushenko/Gustafsson bout was rescheduled for UFC 141 on December 30, 2011.

Antônio Rogério Nogueira was expected to face Rich Franklin at this event, but Nogueira pulled out of the bout on July 16, 2011, citing a shoulder injury. Franklin was then pulled from the card as well.

Jorge Rivera was originally scheduled to face Alessio Sakara. However, on July 25, Rivera announced that Sakara was no longer in the fight due to a torn ACL. The UFC announced that Costas Philippou would be pulled from his bout with Rafael Natal and instead faced Rivera.

UFC 133 featured two preliminary fights live on Spike TV.

== Results ==
Main card
Weight class				Method	Round	Time	Notes
Light Heavyweight	Rashad Evans	def.	Tito Ortiz	TKO (knee to the body and punches)	2	4:48
Middleweight	Vitor Belfort	def.	Yoshihiro Akiyama	KO (punches)	1	1:52
Welterweight	Brian Ebersole	def.	Dennis Hallman	TKO (elbows)	1	4:28
Middleweight	Costas Philippou	def.	Jorge Rivera	Decision (split) (29–28, 28–29, 29–28)	3	5:00
Welterweight	Rory MacDonald	def.	Mike Pyle	TKO (punches)	1	3:54
Preliminary card (Spike TV)
Weight class				Method	Round	Time	Notes
Light Heavyweight	Alexander Gustafsson	def.	Matt Hamill	TKO (punches and elbows)	2	3:34
Featherweight	Chad Mendes	def.	Rani Yahya	Decision (unanimous) (30–27, 30–27, 30–27)	3	5:00
Preliminary card (Facebook)
Weight class				Method	Round	Time	Notes
Catchweight (138 lb)	Ivan Menjivar	def.	Nick Pace	Decision (unanimous) (29–28, 29–28, 29–28)	3	5:00	(Note: This bout aired on the broadcast following the Hendricks vs Pierce bout.)
Welterweight	Johny Hendricks	def.	Mike Pierce	Decision (split) (28–29, 29–28, 29–28)	3	5:00	(Note: This bout aired on the broadcast following the Evans vs Ortiz bout.)
Featherweight	Mike Brown	def.	Nam Phan	Decision (unanimous) (29–27, 29–28, 29–28)	3	5:00
Middleweight	Rafael Natal	def.	Paul Bradley	Decision (unanimous) (30–27, 29–28, 29–28)	3	5:00

== Bonus awards ==
The following fighters received $70,000 bonuses

- Fight of the Night: Rashad Evans vs. Tito Ortiz
- Knockout of the Night: Vitor Belfort
- Submission of the Night: Not awarded as no matches ended by submission.

^Brian Ebersole was awarded an honorary "getting those horrifying shorts off TV as soon as possible" bonus by Dana White for defeating Dennis Hallman in the first round.
