= Coty Wheeler =

American mixed martial artist (born 1978)

- Born: November 10, 1978 (age 47); Albuquerque, New Mexico, U.S.
- Other names: The Ox
- Nationality: American
- Height: 5 ft 6 in (1.68 m)
- Weight: 135 lb (61 kg; 9.6 st)
- Reach: 69.0 in (175 cm)
- Fighting out of: Mescalero, New Mexico
- Years active: 2005–present

Mixed martial arts record
- Total: 19
- Wins: 15
- By knockout: 3
- By submission: 11
- By decision: 1
- Losses: 4
- By knockout: 2
- By decision: 2

Other information
- Mixed martial arts record from Sherdog

Coty Wheeler (October 11, 1978) is an American mixed martial artist, who is perhaps best known for his four fight stint with now-defunct promotion World Extreme Cagefighting. Wheeler currently holds a professional record of 15–5.

== Mixed martial arts career ==
=== World Extreme Cagefighting ===
Wheeler made his WEC debut on September 5, 2007, facing Ian McCall at WEC 30. He lost the fight via third-round TKO. In his second fight in the promotion, Wheeler faced Del Hawkins at WEC 32 on February 13, 2008. He won the fight via flying armbar submission.

After a one-year hiatus, Wheeler returned to WEC and a decision to Charlie Valencia at WEC 43 on October 10, 2009. Wheeler then faced Will Campuzano on January 10, 2010, at WEC 46, losing via unanimous decision. The bout earned Fight of the Night honors.

== Championships and accomplishments ==
- World Extreme Cagefighting
  - Fight of the Night (One time) vs. Will Campuzano

== Mixed martial arts record ==
Professional record breakdown
20 matches	15 wins	5 losses
By knockout	3	2
By submission	11	1
By decision	1	2

Res.	Record	Opponent	Method	Event	Date	Round	Time	Location	Notes
Win	15–5	Roberto Otero	Submission (rear-naked choke)	MWC 4 - Mescalero Warrior Challenge 4	January 16, 2013	1	2:51	Mescalero, New Mexico, United States	
Loss	14–5	Freddie Lux	Submission (rear-naked choke)	MWC 2 - Mescalero Warrior Challenge 2	May 12, 2012	1	4:28	Mescalero, New Mexico, United States	
Loss	14–4	Jens Pulver	TKO (punches)	MMA Fight Pit: Genesis	August 13, 2011	2	1:59	Albuquerque, New Mexico, United States	
Win	14–3	Michael Chupa	Submission (guillotine choke)	Mescalero Warrior Challenge	February 26, 2011	2	0:16	Mescalero, New Mexico, United States	
Win	13–3	Ray Robinson	TKO (punches)	Jackson's MMA Series 2	September 4, 2010	2	1:51	Albuquerque, New Mexico, United States	
Loss	12–3	Will Campuzano	Decision (unanimous)	WEC 46	January 10, 2010	3	5:00	Sacramento, California, United States	Fight of the Night.
Loss	12–2	Charlie Valencia	Decision (unanimous)	WEC 43	October 10, 2009	3	5:00	San Antonio, Texas, United States	
Win	12–1	Jasper Church	TKO (punches)	KOTC: New Breed	March 7, 2009	1	0:28	Mescalero, New Mexico, United States	
Win	11–1	Ryan Axtel	Submission (armbar)	FW 16 - International	November 1, 2008	1	1:10	Albuquerque, New Mexico, United States	
Win	10–1	Brandon Presnell	Submission (guillotine choke)	BATB - Brawl at the Beach	July 18, 2008	1	1:15	Jacksonville, North Carolina, United States	
Win	9–1	Del Hawkins	Submission (flying armbar)	WEC 32: Condit vs. Prater	February 13, 2008	2	1:54	Rio Rancho, New Mexico, United States	
Loss	8–1	Ian McCall	TKO (punches)	WEC 30	September 5, 2007	3	4:34	Las Vegas, Nevada, United States	
Win	8–0	Cody Bell	Submission (triangle choke)	FW 15 - Rumble at Rt. 66 Casino	July 28, 2007	1	1:55	Albuquerque, New Mexico, United States	
Win	7–0	Jeremy Kearby	Submission (kneebar)	FW 14 - Cinco de Whoop Ass	May 5, 2007	1	N/A	Albuquerque, New Mexico, United States	
Win	6–0	Cesar Rodriguez	Submission (armbar)	FW 13 - Fightworld 13	April 7, 2007	1	N/A	Albuquerque, New Mexico, United States	
Win	5–0	Justin Thrift	Decision (unanimous)	UWC 2 - Ultimate Warrior Challenge	February 2, 2007	3	N/A	Jacksonville, Florida, United States	
Win	4–0	Anthony Grisato	Submission (guillotine choke)	FW 12 - Fightworld 12	November 25, 2006	1	2:03	Albuquerque, New Mexico, United States	
Win	3–0	Vincent Ramos	Submission	ROF 25 - Overdrive	July 29, 2006	1	1:52	Vail, Colorado, United States	
Win	2–0	Robert Baker	Submission	Fightworld 7	November 26, 2005	1	3:28	Albuquerque, New Mexico, United States	
Win	1–0	Adam Bonilla	TKO (punches)	Fightworld 6	September 17, 2005	3	2:22	Albuquerque, New Mexico, United States	
