= Brad Pickett =

English mixed martial arts fighter

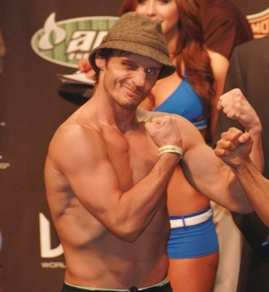
- Born: 24 September 1978 (age 48); London, England
- Other names: One Punch
- Nationality: English
- Height: 5 ft 6 in (1.68 m)
- Weight: 125 lb (57 kg; 8.9 st)
- Division: Flyweight (2014); Bantamweight (2009–2013, 2015–2017); Featherweight (2004–2009); Lightweight (145–155 Ib) (2007)
- Reach: 68 in (173 cm)
- Stance: Orthodox
- Fighting out of: London, England
- Team: American Top Team
- Years active: 2004–2017, 2018

Mixed martial arts record
- Total: 39
- Wins: 25
- By knockout: 7
- By submission: 10
- By decision: 8
- Losses: 14
- By knockout: 3
- By submission: 5
- By decision: 6

Other information
- Mixed martial arts record from Sherdog

Brad Pickett (born 24 September 1978) is an English former mixed martial artist. He is a former Cage Rage British Featherweight Champion. He competed as a bantamweight in the Ultimate Fighting Championship; Dana White stated that Pickett was one of his favourite fighters to watch. He has also competed for World Extreme Cagefighting and BodogFIGHT, and at the Dynamite!! USA event.

== Background ==
Pickett's fight entrance typically involved entering to the song "Wallop" by Chas & Dave, wearing a string vest, cut-off jeans and his customary trilby hat. He is a supporter of the London football club Tottenham Hotspur. Pickett played football and boxed growing up, before becoming interested in MMA.

== Mixed martial arts career ==
Early in his career, Pickett fought mainly for the Cage Rage organisation; his first appearance was on 27 November 2004 with a win over Stuart Grant. He became the Cage Rage British Featherweight Champion on 10 September 2005 at Cage Rage 13 by defeating Ozzy Haluk via submission. On 22 August, at Ultimate Challenge MMA: Payback (held in The Troxy, London), Pickett won his seventh successive mixed martial arts bout, against David Lee. The win came due to a guillotine choke in the first round.

=== World Extreme Cagefighting ===
On 30 October 2009, the Zuffa-owned WEC announced they had signed Pickett to a multi-fight deal. Pickett, fighting at bantamweight, made his WEC debut against Kyle Dietz on 19 December 2009 at WEC 45. He won the fight via submission in the second round, also winning Submission of the Night honours.

Pickett next faced WEC newcomer Demetrious Johnson on 24 April 2010 at WEC 48. In a competitive fight, both men exchanged takedowns and strikes throughout, though Pickett was more dominant on the ground, controlling the fight with well-timed takedowns and counter-strikes: Pickett won via unanimous decision (30–27, 30–27, 29–28).

Pickett's next bout was against WEC veteran Scott Jorgensen. Pickett had some success on his feet during the first two rounds, but was ultimately out-wrestled by the 3-time Pac-10 champion in the latter two rounds, losing to Jorgensen 30–27 on all the judges' scorecards.

Pickett then faced Ivan Menjivar on 16 December 2010 at WEC 53. Both fighters proved to be evenly matched; Pickett edged a unanimous decision 29–28.

=== Ultimate Fighting Championship ===
==== Bantamweight ====
In October 2010, World Extreme Cagefighting merged with the Ultimate Fighting Championship. As part of the merger, all WEC fighters were transferred to the UFC.

Pickett was expected to make his UFC debut against former WEC Bantamweight Champion Miguel Torres on 28 May 2011 at UFC 130. However, Pickett was forced out of the bout with an injury and replaced by Demetrious Johnson.

Pickett faced Renan Barão on 5 November 2011 at UFC 138. Pickett was submitted in the first round via rear-naked choke. The bout earned Fight of the Night honours.

Pickett defeated Damacio Page by submission via rear-naked-choke in the second round of UFC on Fuel TV: Gustafsson vs. Silva. on 14 April 2012. The bout was awarded Fight of the Night.

Pickett next fought Yves Jabouin on 29 September 2012 at UFC on Fuel TV 5. He won the fight via first-round KO, earning Knockout of the Night honours in the process.

Pickett was defeated by Eddie Wineland via split decision on 29 December 2012 at UFC 155.

Pickett faced Mike Easton on 6 April 2013 at UFC on Fuel TV 9. He won the back-and-forth fight via split decision. The win earned Pickett another Fight of the Night bonus.

Pickett faced Michael McDonald on 17 August 2013, at UFC Fight Night 26. Pickett lost the fight via submission (triangle choke) in the second round. Despite the loss, Pickett was given a Fight of the Night bonus.

==== Flyweight ====
In late 2013, it was announced that Pickett would drop down to the Flyweight division for his next fight. He was expected to make his Flyweight debut against Ian McCall at UFC Fight Night 37 on 8 March 2014. However, on 13 February, it was announced that McCall had pulled out of the bout and was replaced by promotional newcomer Neil Seery. He won the fight via unanimous decision.

The rescheduled bout with McCall took place on 19 July 2014 at UFC Fight Night 46. Pickett lost the fight via unanimous decision.

Pickett faced Chico Camus on 22 November 2014 at UFC Fight Night 57. He lost the back-and-forth fight via split decision.

==== Return to Bantamweight ====
Pickett faced Thomas Almeida in a bantamweight bout on 11 July 2015 at UFC 189. He lost his third consecutive fight via KO in the second round.

Pickett was expected to face Henry Briones on 27 February 2016 at UFC Fight Night 84. However, Briones pulled out of the bout on January 22 and was replaced by Francisco Rivera. Pickett won the back-and-forth fight via split decision. 19 of 24 media outlets scored the bout in favour of Rivera.

The bout with Henry Briones was rescheduled and expected to take place on 3 September 2016 at UFC Fight Night 93. However, in early August, Briones was replaced Iuri Alcântara, for undisclosed reasons. Subsequently, the pairing was rescheduled to take place a month later at UFC 204. Pickett lost the fight via submission in the first round.

Pickett faced Urijah Faber on 17 December 2016 at UFC on Fox 22. He lost via unanimous decision.

A rescheduled fight with Henry Briones was expected to take place on 18 March 2017. However, Briones pulled out a week before the event and was replaced by Marlon Vera. Due to the short notice and preparation for Vera, the bout was contested at a catch weight of 140 lbs. Pickett lost the fight via TKO in the third round. After the fight, Pickett confirmed his intention to retire from MMA competition.

=== Return from retirement ===
After a self-imposed 17-month hiatus, Pickett signed a multi-fight deal with Absolute Championship Berkut and was expected to fight in ACB's first event in London, ACB 91 against Jesse Brock. However, the event was cancelled and Pickett's status with the promotion moving forward is unknown.

== Bare knuckle fighting ==
Brad Pickett signed with BKB, a bare knuckle fighting organisation in Great Britain, and was scheduled to make his debut in the sport and organisation on March 30, 2019. Pickett won his debut.

== Championships and awards ==
=== Mixed martial arts ===
- Ultimate Fighting Championship
  - Fight of the Night (Four times)
  - Knockout of the Night (One time)
- World Extreme Cagefighting
  - Fight of the Night (One time)
  - Submission of the Night (One time)
- Cage Rage Championships
  - Cage Rage British Featherweight Champion (One time)
  - One successful title defence
- Ultimate Challenge MMA
  - UCMMA Featherweight Champion (One time)

== Mixed martial arts record ==
Professional record breakdown
39 matches	25 wins	14 losses
By knockout	7	3
By submission	10	5
By decision	8	6

Res.	Record	Opponent	Method	Event	Date	Round	Time	Location	Notes
Loss	25–14	Marlon Vera	TKO (head kick and punches)	UFC Fight Night: Manuwa vs. Anderson	18 March 2017	3	3:50	London, England	Catchweight (140 lbs) bout.
Loss	25–13	Urijah Faber	Decision (unanimous)	UFC on Fox: VanZant vs. Waterson	17 December 2016	3	5:00	Sacramento, California, United States	
Loss	25–12	Iuri Alcântara	Submission (triangle choke)	UFC 204	8 October 2016	1	1:59	Manchester, England	
Win	25–11	Francisco Rivera	Decision (split)	UFC Fight Night: Silva vs. Bisping	27 February 2016	3	5:00	London, England	
Loss	24–11	Thomas Almeida	KO (knee)	UFC 189	11 July 2015	2	0:29	Las Vegas, Nevada, United States	Return to Bantamweight.
Loss	24–10	Chico Camus	Decision (split)	UFC Fight Night: Edgar vs. Swanson	22 November 2014	3	5:00	Austin, Texas, United States	
Loss	24–9	Ian McCall	Decision (unanimous)	UFC Fight Night: McGregor vs. Brandao	19 July 2014	3	5:00	Dublin, Ireland	
Win	24–8	Neil Seery	Decision (unanimous)	UFC Fight Night: Gustafsson vs. Manuwa	8 March 2014	3	5:00	London, England	Flyweight debut.
Loss	23–8	Michael McDonald	Submission (triangle choke)	UFC Fight Night: Shogun vs. Sonnen	17 August 2013	2	3:43	Boston, Massachusetts, United States	Fight of the Night
Win	23–7	Mike Easton	Decision (split)	UFC on Fuel TV: Mousasi vs. Latifi	6 April 2013	3	5:00	Stockholm, Sweden	Fight of the Night.
Loss	22–7	Eddie Wineland	Decision (split)	UFC 155	29 December 2012	3	5:00	Las Vegas, Nevada, United States	
Win	22–6	Yves Jabouin	KO (punch)	UFC on Fuel TV: Struve vs. Miocic	29 September 2012	1	3:40	Nottingham, England	Knockout of the Night.
Win	21–6	Damacio Page	Submission (rear-naked choke)	UFC on Fuel TV: Gustafsson vs. Silva	14 April 2012	2	4:05	Stockholm, Sweden	Fight of the Night.
Loss	20–6	Renan Barão	Submission (rear-naked choke)	UFC 138	5 November 2011	1	4:09	Birmingham, England	Fight of the Night.
Win	20–5	Ivan Menjivar	Decision (unanimous)	WEC 53	16 December 2010	3	5:00	Glendale, Arizona, United States	
Loss	19–5	Scott Jorgensen	Decision (unanimous)	WEC 50	18 August 2010	3	5:00	Las Vegas, Nevada, United States	Fight of the Night.
Win	19–4	Demetrious Johnson	Decision (unanimous)	WEC 48	24 April 2010	3	5:00	Sacramento, California, United States	
Win	18–4	Kyle Dietz	Submission (Peruvian necktie)	WEC 45	19 December 2009	2	4:36	Las Vegas, Nevada, United States	Bantamweight debut. Submission of the Night.
Win	17–4	David Lee	Submission (guillotine choke)	UCMMA 6: Payback	22 August 2009	1	2:26	London, England	Won the Ultimate Challenge UK Featherweight Championship.
Win	16–4	Dino Gambatesa	Submission (guillotine choke)	UCMMA 3: Unstoppable	28 March 2009	2	0:15	London, England	
Win	15–4	Antanas Jazbutis	TKO (punch to the body)	Cage Rage 28	20 September 2008	3	N/A	London, England	
Win	14–4	Cristian Binda	Submission (guillotine choke)	Cage Rage 27	12 July 2008	2	2:52	London, England	
Win	13–4	Paul Reed	Decision (majority)	Cage Rage 26	10 May 2008	3	5:00	Birmingham, England	
Win	12–4	Frederic Fernandez	Submission (guillotine choke)	FX3: Fight Night 7	15 March 2008	1	N/A	Reading, England	
Win	11–4	Vaughan Lee	TKO (punches)	Cage Rage Contenders 6	18 August 2007	3	3:20	London, England	
Loss	10–4	Hideo Tokoro	Submission (armbar)	Dynamite!! USA	2 June 2007	1	2:41	Los Angeles, California, United States	Lightweight bout.
Loss	10–3	Alex Owen	Decision (majority)	Cage Rage 21	21 April 2007	3	5:00	London, England	
Win	10–2	Gilbert Sims	TKO (punches)	Bodog Fight: Costa Rica Combat	16 February 2007	2	3:12	San José, Costa Rica	
Win	9–2	Phil Raeburn	Submission (armbar)	HOP 7: Cage Fever	26 November 2006	1	3:20	Swansea, Wales	
Win	8–2	Bret Lee	Submission (armbar)	Intense Fighting: Caged	11 November 2006	1	1:18	Peterborough, England	
Win	7–2	John Trent	Submission (armbar)	Absolute Fighting Championships 19	21 October 2006	1	3:58	Boca Raton, Florida, United States	
Loss	6–2	Robbie Olivier	Submission (rear-naked choke)	Cage Rage 18	30 September 2006	3	3:03	London, England	Lost the Cage Rage British Featherweight Championship.
Win	6–1	Hiroyuki Abe	Decision (unanimous)	Cage Rage 16	22 April 2006	3	5:00	London, England	
Win	5–1	Robbie Olivier	Decision (majority)	Cage Rage 15	4 February 2006	3	5:00	London, England	Defended the Cage Rage British Featherweight Championship.
Win	4–1	Ozzy Haluk	TKO (stomp)	Cage Rage 13	10 September 2005	2	4:25	London, England	Won the Cage Rage British Featherweight Championship.
Win	3–1	Jordan Miller	Submission (armbar)	Cage Rage 12	2 July 2005	2	2:32	London, England	
Win	2–1	Aaron Blackwell	TKO (corner stoppage)	Cage Rage 11	30 April 2005	2	5:00	London, England	
Loss	1–1	Chris Freeborn	TKO (punches)	Cage Rage 10	26 February 2005	2	3:20	London, England	
Win	1–0	Stuart Grant	TKO (punches)	Cage Rage 9	27 November 2004	1	0:17	London, England	

== Bare knuckle record ==
Professional record breakdown
1 match	1 win	0 losses
By knockout	1	0

Res.	Record	Opponent	Method	Event	Date	Round	Time	Location	Notes
Win	1–0	Mark Handley	TKO (punch)	Bare Knuckle Boxing 16	30 March 2019	1	0:20	London, England	Won the Flyweight British Championship

== See also ==
- List of male mixed martial artists
