= UFC 139 =

UFC mixed martial arts event in 2011

UFC 139: Shogun vs. Henderson
- The poster for UFC 139: Shogun vs. Henderson
- Promotion: Ultimate Fighting Championship
- Date: November 19, 2011
- Venue: HP Pavilion
- City: San Jose, California
- Attendance: 13,832
- Total gate: $1,268,000
- Buyrate: 290,000

Event chronology
UFC on Fox: Velasquez vs. dos Santos	UFC 139: Shogun vs. Henderson	The Ultimate Fighter: Team Bisping vs. Team Miller Finale

UFC 139: Shogun vs. Henderson was a mixed martial arts event held by the Ultimate Fighting Championship on November 19, 2011, at the HP Pavilion in San Jose, California. It was the first UFC event in San Jose, the longtime home and base arena for Strikeforce.

== Background ==
UFC 139 featured two preliminary fights live on Spike TV.

UFC Heavyweight Champion Cain Velasquez was originally expected to have his first title defense against Junior dos Santos at this event. However, on September 2, 2011, the UFC announced that fight would be moved to the inaugural UFC on Fox event.

To fill in the vacancy left by Cain vs dos Santos, Dana White confirmed on September 20, 2011 that Dan Henderson had re-signed with the UFC and would fight Maurício "Shogun" Rua for the main event. White also declared that Shogun vs. Henderson would be a "No. 1 contender’s match" for the light heavyweight title. However, White clarified that Rashad Evans was still planned to get the title shot against the winner of Jon Jones vs Rampage Jackson, and that the winner of Shogun vs. Henderson would then get the second crack at the title.

Vitor Belfort was briefly linked to a matchup with Cung Le at this event. However, Belfort was removed from the bout and replaced by Wanderlei Silva.

Johnny Eduardo was expected to face Michael McDonald at the event. However, Eduardo was forced from the card with a shoulder injury on November 4 and replaced by promotional newcomer Alex Soto.

It was initially suspected that the first Spike TV preliminary fight would feature Tom Lawlor vs. Chris Weidman, but it became known that it was Michael McDonald fighting UFC newcomer Alex Soto instead.

During the official UFC 139 weigh ins, Shamar Bailey and Nick Pace failed to make the weight limit for their respective weight classes. Bailey came in 3 pounds over, while Pace came in six pounds over. Each fighter was fined 20 percent of their earnings and their bouts took at catchweights of 158 lb and 141 lb respectively.

== Results ==
Main card
Weight class				Method	Round	Time	Notes
Light Heavyweight	Dan Henderson	def.	Maurício Rua	Decision (unanimous) (48–47, 48–47, 48–47)	5	5:00
Middleweight	Wanderlei Silva	def.	Cung Le	TKO (knees and punches)	2	4:49
Bantamweight	Urijah Faber	def.	Brian Bowles	Submission (guillotine choke)	2	1:27	(Note: UFC Bantamweight Championship title eliminator.)
Welterweight	Martin Kampmann	def.	Rick Story	Decision (split) (30–27, 28-29, 29-28)	3	5:00
Light Heavyweight	Stephan Bonnar	def.	Kyle Kingsbury	Decision (unanimous) (30–25, 30–27, 30–27)	3	5:00
Preliminary card (Spike TV)
Light Heavyweight	Ryan Bader	def.	Jason Brilz	KO (punch)	1	1:17
Bantamweight	Michael McDonald	def.	Alex Soto	KO (punches)	1	0:56
Preliminary card (Facebook)
Middleweight	Chris Weidman	def.	Tom Lawlor	Technical Submission (D'Arce choke)	1	2:07
Lightweight	Gleison Tibau	def.	Rafael dos Anjos	Decision (split) (28–29, 29–28, 30–27)	3	5:00
Catchweight (141 lb)	Miguel Torres	def.	Nick Pace	Decision (unanimous) (30–27, 30–27, 30–27)	3	5:00
Welterweight	Seth Baczynski	def.	Matt Brown	Submission (guillotine choke)	2	0:42
Catchweight (158 lb)	Danny Castillo	def.	Shamar Bailey	TKO (punches)	1	4:52

== Critical reception ==
The event was well received by critics. The main event drew many accolades, including UFC President Dana White calling it "one of the top three best fights ever in MMA", later comparing the fight to the Thrilla in Manila. The fight would later garner numerous Fight of the Year awards. The fight was later included in the UFC Hall of Fame in 2018.

== Bonus awards ==
The following fighters received $70,000 bonuses.

- Fight of the Night: Maurício Rua vs. Dan Henderson and Wanderlei Silva vs. Cung Le
- Knockout of the Night: Michael McDonald
- Submission of the Night: Urijah Faber

== Reported payout ==
The following is the reported payout to the fighters as reported to the California State Athletic Commission. It does not include sponsor money or "locker room" bonuses often given by the UFC and also do not include the UFC's traditional "fight night" bonuses.

- Dan Henderson: $250,000 (no win bonus) def. Maurício Rua: $165,000
- Wanderlei Silva: $200,000 (no win bonus) def. Cung Le: $350,000
- Urijah Faber: $64,000 ($32,000 win bonus) def. Brian Bowles: $19,000
- Martin Kampmann: $58,000 ($29,000 win bonus) def. Rick Story: $19,000
- Stephan Bonnar: $68,000 ($34,000 win bonus) def. Kyle Kingsbury: $10,000
- Ryan Bader: $48,000 ($24,000 win bonus) def. Jason Brilz: $13,000
- Michael McDonald: $14,000 ($7,000 win bonus) def. Alex Soto: $6,000
- Chris Weidman: $24,000 ($12,000 win bonus) def. Tom Lawlor: $12,000
- Gleison Tibau: $54,000 ($27,000 win bonus) def. Rafael dos Anjos: $16,000
- Miguel Torres: $60,000 ($30,000 win bonus) def. Nick Pace: $4,000 ^
- Seth Baczynski: $16,000 ($8,000 win bonus) def. Matt Brown: $12,000
- Danny Castillo: $34,000 ($17,000 win bonus) def. Shamar Bailey: $8,000 ^

^ Shamar Bailey and Nick Pace were reportedly fined 20 percent of their purse for failing to make the required weight for their respective fights. The CSAC's initial report did not include information on the penalty.
