= Nick Pace =

American mixed martial arts fighter

- Born: April 17, 1987 (age 39); Staten Island, New York, United States
- Height: 5 ft 7 in (1.70 m)
- Weight: 135 lb (61 kg; 9.6 st)
- Division: Bantamweight
- Reach: 68 in (173 cm)
- Fighting out of: New York City, New York
- Team: Tiger Schulmann Fight Team
- Rank: Black belt in Brazilian jiu jitsu
- Years active: 2008–2017

Mixed martial arts record
- Total: 11
- Wins: 8
- By knockout: 1
- By submission: 5
- By decision: 2
- Losses: 3
- By decision: 3

Other information
- Mixed martial arts record from Sherdog

Nick Pace (born April 17, 1987) is an American former professional mixed martial artist who competed in the bantamweight division. A professional MMA competitor from 2008 to 2017, Pace mostly fought in the Ring of Combat promotion where he was the reigning and inaugural Ring of Combat Bantamweight champion until he signed with World Extreme Cagefighting. After the WECs merger with the UFC, Pace became a member of the UFC. After he retired from MMA in 2017, he became a professional Jiu jitsu competitor and competed in the Combat Jiu-Jitsu Worlds tournament hosted by Eddie Bravo

== Mixed martial arts career ==
=== Background ===
Pace trains with the Tiger Schulmann Fight Team in Elmwood Park, New Jersey, alongside former Bellator champion Lyman Good and former UFC Bantamweight title contender Jimmie Rivera. Pace is head instructor at the Staten Island branch of Tiger Schulmann's Mixed Martial Arts and has trained with the team since the age of 10, influenced by his childhood love of The Teenage Mutant Ninja Turtles.

=== Bellator ===
Pace began his career in the Ring of Combat promotion at Ring of Combat 22. He defeated Sean Santella via unanimous decision. Pace then joined the Bellator Fighting Championships and gained notice in the media with a flying knee KO of Collin Tebo. Pace later said "I hope Bellator calls me because I know I can win their tournament, but I hope the WEC calls me too."

=== Ring of Combat ===
Despite his wishes to compete in the Bellator tournament, he did not return and instead rejoined Ring of Combat where he defeated Lennox Chance via submission (rear naked choke) in the first round. He followed this up with a unanimous decision victory over Jose Adriano at Ring of Combat 29.

Pace was then rewarded with a Ring of Combat Bantamweight Championship fight against Steve DeAngelis. Pace was able to neutralise the wrestling of his opponent to keep himself out of trouble. Pace then secured a D'Arce Choke for the tapout, to take the title and become the inaugural champion. Pace would later have to relinquish the title, however, after signing with World Extreme Cagefighting.

=== World Extreme Cagefighting ===
Pace made his WEC debut against Demetrious Johnson on September 30, 2010, replacing Clint Godfrey. He lost the fight via unanimous decision.

=== Ultimate Fighting Championship ===
In October 2010, World Extreme Cagefighting merged with the Ultimate Fighting Championship. As part of the merger, all WEC fighters were transferred to the UFC.

Pace faced Will Campuzano on December 4, 2010 at The Ultimate Fighter: Team GSP vs. Team Koscheck Finale. Pace failed to make weight for the bout, so it was fought as a catchweight bout. Pace defeated Campuzano in the 3rd round with a pillory choke, which was the first time the submission was used in a professional mixed martial arts bout. However, despite the rare submission, Pace was ineligible for the Submission of the Night bonus due to missing weight, which instead went to Cody McKenzie.

Pace was expected to face Michael McDonald on August 6, 2011 at UFC 133. However, Pace instead faced Ivan Menjivar at the event after McDonald was pulled from the bout to compete at UFC 130. Pace lost via unanimous decision (29-28, 29-28, 29-28).

Pace faced Miguel Torres on November 19, 2011 at UFC 139 in a catchweight bout of 141 pounds after missing weight. Pace lost a decisive decision to Torres after three rounds.

After losing to Torres, and missing weight for the second time in three fights, Pace was released from the promotion.

=== Cage Fury Fighting Championships ===
After four years away from competition, Pace made his return to MMA and fought for the CFFC Bantamweight Championship against Ricky Bandejas on Oct 31, 2015. He won the bout and became the title holder. He then defended his title two years later against Ahmet Kayretli. He retired from MMA shortly after and vacated the title.

== Jiu-Jitsu career ==
A year later, Pace made his comeback to martial arts competition in the Combat Jiu Jitsu Worlds BJJ tournament. He has competed in this tournament twice to date.

== Championships and accomplishments ==
- Ring of Combat
  - ROC Bantamweight Championship (One time)
- Cage Fury Fighting Championships
  - CFFC Bantamweight Championship (One time)
- Opened his own Tiger Schulmanns School in Tottenvile, Staten Island NY where he teaches alongside his brother Ricky Pace

== Mixed martial arts record ==
Professional record breakdown
11 matches	8 wins	3 losses
By knockout	1	0
By submission	5	0
By decision	2	3

Res.	Record	Opponent	Method	Event	Date	Round	Time	Location	Notes
Win	8–3	Ahmet Kayretli	Submission (rear-naked choke)	Cage Fury Fighting Championships 63	February 18, 2017	3	3:47	Atlantic City, New Jersey, United States	Defended the CFFC Bantamweight Championship
Win	7–3	Ricky Bandejas	Submission (rear-naked choke)	Cage Fury Fighting Championships 52	October 31, 2015	1	2:51	Atlantic City, New Jersey, United States	Won the CFFC Bantamweight Championship
Loss	6–3	Miguel Torres	Decision (unanimous)	UFC 139	November 19, 2011	3	5:00	San Jose, California, United States	Catchweight fight as Pace weighed in at 141 lb.
Loss	6–2	Ivan Menjivar	Decision (unanimous)	UFC 133	August 6, 2011	3	5:00	Philadelphia, Pennsylvania, United States	Catchweight fight as Menjivar weighed in at 138 lb.
Win	6–1	Will Campuzano	Submission (Pace choke)	The Ultimate Fighter 12 Finale	December 4, 2010	3	4:32	Las Vegas, Nevada, United States	Catchweight fight as Pace weighed in at 138 lb.
Loss	5–1	Demetrious Johnson	Decision (unanimous)	WEC 51	September 30, 2010	3	5:00	Broomfield, Colorado, United States	
Win	5–0	Steve DeAngelis	Submission (D'arce choke)	Ring of Combat 30	June 11, 2010	1	3:03	Atlantic City, New Jersey, United States	Won the ROC Bantamweight title.
Win	4–0	Jose Adriano	Decision (unanimous)	Ring of Combat 29	April 16, 2010	3	4:00	Atlantic City, New Jersey, United States	
Win	3–0	Lennox Chance	Submission (rear-naked choke)	Ring of Combat 28	February 19, 2010	1	1:37	Atlantic City, New Jersey, United States	
Win	2–0	Collin Tebo	KO (flying knee)	Bellator 11	June 12, 2009	1	1:37	Uncasville, Connecticut, United States	
Win	1–0	Sean Santella	Decision (unanimous)	Ring of Combat 22	November 21, 2008	2	4:00	Atlantic City, New Jersey, United States	
