= Eddie Wineland =

American mixed martial arts fighter (born 1984)

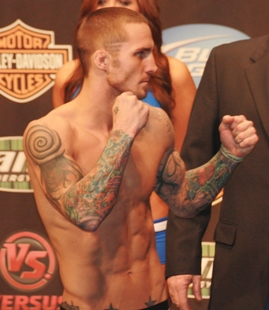
- Wineland in 2010
- Born: June 26, 1984 (age 42); Chesterton, Indiana, U.S.
- Height: 5 ft 7 1/2 in (1.71 m) (Note: Sherdog and WEC report his height as 5 ft. 8 in.)
- Weight: 135 lb (61 kg; 9.6 st)
- Division: Bantamweight
- Reach: 69 in (175 cm)
- Fighting out of: Chesterton, Indiana, U.S.
- Team: Duneland Vale Tudo
- Rank: Blue belt in Brazilian Jiu-Jitsu
- Years active: 2003–2022

Mixed martial arts record
- Total: 41
- Wins: 24
- By knockout: 15
- By submission: 4
- By decision: 5
- Losses: 16
- By knockout: 6
- By submission: 4
- By decision: 6
- Draws: 1

Other information
- Website: eddiewineland.com
- Mixed martial arts record from Sherdog

Eddie Wineland (born June 26, 1984) is an American retired mixed martial artist, who competed in the Bantamweight division of the Ultimate Fighting Championship (UFC). A professional competitor from 2003 until 2022, Wineland was the inaugural WEC Bantamweight Champion.

== Background ==
Wineland was born on June 26, 1984, and has one younger brother. Wineland grew up competing in wrestling and graduated from Chesterton High School in Porter County, Indiana, when he was 17 years old. He began his training for MMA with a friend at Duneland Vale Tudo. Two months later, Wineland fought a 37-year-old man and won. Wineland's brother is an inspiration for his careers as a fighter and a firefighter. When his brother was two years old, he burned 98% of his body in an accident.

== Mixed martial arts career ==
=== Early career ===
Wineland began his mixed martial arts career competing in regional organizations in his native Midwestern United States. He had compiled a total of 15 professional fights before signing with World Extreme Cagefighting.

=== World Extreme Cagefighting ===
Wineland became the inaugural WEC Bantamweight Champion after defeating Antonio Banuelos via first-round TKO at WEC 20. Wineland lost the title in his first defense against Chase Beebe by unanimous decision at WEC 26: Condit vs. Alessio.

Wineland was defeated by Rani Yahya via first round submission on April 5, 2009, at WEC 40.

Wineland defeated Manny Tapia via unanimous decision on October 10, 2009, at WEC 43.

Wineland was scheduled to face Rafael Rebello on January 10, 2010, at WEC 46, but Rebello was forced off the card with an injury and replaced by George Roop. He won via unanimous decision.

Wineland was scheduled to face Charlie Valencia on June 20, 2010, at WEC 49, but Valencia was forced off the card with an injury. Wineland eventually faced Will Campuzano. Wineland defeated Campuzano via second-round TKO, earning Knockout of the Night honors.

Wineland was expected to face Damacio Page on November 11, 2010, at WEC 52. However, Wineland was forced out of the bout with a shoulder injury and replaced by Demetrious Johnson.

Wineland then faced Ken Stone on December 16, 2010, at WEC 53. He won via KO due to a slam in the first round, earning his second straight Knockout of the Night award.

=== Ultimate Fighting Championship ===
On October 28, 2010, World Extreme Cagefighting merged with the Ultimate Fighting Championship. As part of the merger, all WEC fighters were transferred to the UFC.

In his UFC debut, Wineland faced former WEC Featherweight Champion Urijah Faber on March 19, 2011, at UFC 128. Wineland lost the back and forth fight via unanimous decision.

Wineland fought Joseph Benavidez on August 14, 2011, at UFC on Versus 5. He was defeated by Benavidez via unanimous decision.

Wineland was expected to face Demetrious Johnson on January 28, 2012, at UFC on Fox 2 However, on December 10, Dana White stated Johnson had been pulled from the bout and be a participant in the UFC's inaugural Flyweight tournament in March. Wineland was then expected to face Johnny Bedford. However, Wineland himself was forced out of the bout with an injury and replaced by promotional newcomer Mitch Gagnon.

Wineland next faced Scott Jorgensen on June 8, 2012, at UFC on FX 3. Wineland defeated Jorgenson via second-round knockout, notable for the fact it marked the first time the durable Jorgensen had been stopped via KO. The performance earned both participants Fight of the Night honors.

Wineland faced Brad Pickett on December 29, 2012, at UFC 155. Wineland defeated Pickett via split decision.

Wineland was expected to face then current Interim UFC Bantamweight Champion Renan Barão on June 15, 2013, at UFC 161. However, on May 21 it was confirmed that Barão had pulled out if the bout, citing a foot injury. With, Barão's departure, Wineland was removed from the card as well.

The bout with Barão eventually took place on September 21, 2013, at UFC 165. After winning the first round, Wineland lost the fight via TKO in the second round after he was dropped with a spinning kick and follow up flurry, forcing a referee stoppage.

Wineland faced Yves Jabouin at UFC on Fox 10. Wineland won the fight via TKO in the second round.

Wineland faced Johnny Eduardo on May 10, 2014, at UFC Fight Night 40. He lost the fight via KO in the first round.

After over a year away from the sport, Wineland returned to face Bryan Caraway on July 25, 2015, at UFC on Fox 16. He lost the fight by unanimous decision.

Wineland next faced Frankie Saenz on July 23, 2016, at UFC on Fox 20. He won the back and forth fight via TKO in the third round and also earned a Performance on the Night bonus.

Wineland faced Takeya Mizugaki on December 17, 2016, at UFC on Fox 22. He won the fight via TKO in the first round.

Wineland next faced John Dodson on April 22, 2017, at UFC Fight Night 108. He lost the fight via unanimous decision.

Wineland faced Alejandro Pérez on July 14, 2018, at UFC Fight Night 133. He lost the fight via unanimous decision.

Wineland faced promotional newcomer Grigory Popov on June 8, 2019, at UFC 238. He won the fight via TKO in the second round.

Wineland was expected to face Marlon Vera on March 28, 2020, at UFC on ESPN: Ngannou vs. Rozenstruik. Due to the COVID-19 pandemic, the event was eventually postponed .

Wineland faced Sean O'Malley at UFC 250 on June 6. He lost the bout via first-round knockout.

Wineland faced John Castañeda on February 20, 2021, at UFC Fight Night 185. He lost the fight via first-round technical knockout.

Wineland faced Cody Stamann on June 18, 2022, at UFC on ESPN 37. He lost the fight via TKO in under a minute of the first round.

On June 19, 2022, Wineland announced his retirement in a post on social media which he wrote "I didn’t get an opportunity to leave my gloves in the cage but as Jim Morrison once sang this is the end". Wineland thanked the company, the match makers and the fans of which UFC president Dana White also said how Wineland was a "Another one that always will fight anyone, anywhere, anytime. Good dude. We like him a lot and wish him the best in his retirement."

== Personal life ==
Wineland attended college for a year and a half and is a full-time firefighter in LaPorte, Indiana. He also works part-time for a maintenance company. Wineland and his wife Amber have two children.

== Championships and awards ==
- Ultimate Fighting Championship
  - Fight of the Night (One time)
  - Performance of the Night (One time)
- World Extreme Cagefighting
  - WEC Bantamweight Championship (One time, first)
  - Knockout of the Night (Two times)
- Total Fight Challenge
  - TF Challenge Bantamweight Championship (One time)
- Sherdog
  - 2010 All-Violence 1st Team

== Mixed martial arts record ==
Professional record breakdown
41 matches	24 wins	16 losses
By knockout	15	6
By submission	4	4
By decision	5	6
Draws	1	

Res.	Record	Opponent	Method	Event	Date	Round	Time	Location	Notes
Loss	24–16–1	Cody Stamann	TKO (punches)	UFC on ESPN: Kattar vs. Emmett	June 18, 2022	1	0:59	Austin, Texas, United States	
Loss	24–15–1	John Castañeda	TKO (punches)	UFC Fight Night: Blaydes vs. Lewis	February 20, 2021	1	4:44	Las Vegas, Nevada, United States	
Loss	24–14–1	Sean O'Malley	KO (punch)	UFC 250	June 6, 2020	1	1:54	Las Vegas, Nevada, United States	
Win	24–13–1	Grigory Popov	KO (punches)	UFC 238	June 8, 2019	2	4:47	Chicago, Illinois, United States	
Loss	23–13–1	Alejandro Pérez	Decision (unanimous)	UFC Fight Night: dos Santos vs. Ivanov	July 14, 2018	3	5:00	Boise, Idaho, United States	
Loss	23–12–1	John Dodson	Decision (unanimous)	UFC Fight Night: Swanson vs. Lobov	April 22, 2017	3	5:00	Nashville, Tennessee, United States	
Win	23–11–1	Takeya Mizugaki	TKO (punches)	UFC on Fox: VanZant vs. Waterson	December 17, 2016	1	3:04	Sacramento, California, United States	
Win	22–11–1	Frankie Saenz	TKO (punches)	UFC on Fox: Holm vs. Shevchenko	July 23, 2016	3	1:54	Chicago, Illinois, United States	Performance of the Night.
Loss	21–11–1	Bryan Caraway	Decision (unanimous)	UFC on Fox: Dillashaw vs. Barão 2	July 25, 2015	3	5:00	Chicago, Illinois, United States	
Loss	21–10–1	Johnny Eduardo	KO (punches)	UFC Fight Night: Brown vs. Silva	May 10, 2014	1	4:37	Cincinnati, Ohio, United States	
Win	21–9–1	Yves Jabouin	TKO (punches)	UFC on Fox: Henderson vs. Thomson	January 25, 2014	2	4:16	Chicago, Illinois, United States	
Loss	20–9–1	Renan Barão	TKO (spinning back kick and punches)	UFC 165	September 21, 2013	2	0:35	Toronto, Ontario, Canada	For the interim UFC Bantamweight Championship.
Win	20–8–1	Brad Pickett	Decision (split)	UFC 155	December 29, 2012	3	5:00	Las Vegas, Nevada, United States	
Win	19–8–1	Scott Jorgensen	KO (punches)	UFC on FX: Johnson vs. McCall	June 8, 2012	2	4:10	Sunrise, Florida, United States	Fight of the Night.
Loss	18–8–1	Joseph Benavidez	Decision (unanimous)	UFC Live: Hardy vs. Lytle	August 14, 2011	3	5:00	Milwaukee, Wisconsin, United States	
Loss	18–7–1	Urijah Faber	Decision (unanimous)	UFC 128	March 19, 2011	3	5:00	Newark, New Jersey, United States	
Win	18–6–1	Ken Stone	KO (slam)	WEC 53	December 16, 2010	1	2:11	Glendale, Arizona, United States	Knockout of the Night.
Win	17–6–1	Will Campuzano	TKO (body punch)	WEC 49	June 20, 2010	2	4:44	Edmonton, Alberta, Canada	Knockout of the Night.
Win	16–6–1	George Roop	Decision (unanimous)	WEC 46	January 10, 2010	3	5:00	Sacramento, California, United States	
Win	15–6–1	Manny Tapia	Decision (unanimous)	WEC 43	October 10, 2009	3	5:00	San Antonio, Texas, United States	
Loss	14–6–1	Rani Yahya	Submission (rear-naked choke)	WEC 40	April 5, 2009	1	1:07	Chicago, Illinois, United States	
Win	14–5–1	Wade Choate	TKO (punches)	C3: Domination	November 22, 2008	1	2:29	Hammond, Indiana, United States	
Win	13–5–1	Jason Tabor	KO (punches)	Total Fight Challenge 11	February 19, 2008	2	4:42	Hammond, Indiana, United States	Won the TF Challenge Bantamweight Championship.
Loss	12–5–1	Chase Beebe	Decision (unanimous)	WEC 26	March 24, 2007	5	5:00	Las Vegas, Nevada, United States	Lost the WEC Bantamweight Championship.
Win	12–4–1	Dan Swift	Decision (unanimous)	Total Fight Challenge 7	February 10, 2007	2	5:00	Hammond, Indiana, United States	
Win	11–4–1	Antonio Banuelos	KO (head kick and punches)	WEC 20	May 5, 2006	1	2:36	Lemoore, California, United States	Won the inaugural WEC Bantamweight Championship.
Win	10–4–1	Kurt Deeron	TKO (punches)	Duneland Classic 3	March 25, 2006	2	2:26	Portage, Indiana, United States	
Win	9–4–1	Tim Norman	Submission (rear-naked choke)	Total Fight Challenge 5	February 18, 2006	1	2:40	Hammond, Indiana, United States	
Win	8–4–1	Justin Hamm	TKO (punches)	ECF: Beatdown At The Fairgrounds 5	February 11, 2006	2	4:55	Indianapolis, Indiana, United States	
Win	7–4–1	Christian Nielson	Decision	Courage Fighting Championships 4	January 7, 2006	3	5:00	Lincoln, Illinois, United States	
Win	6–4–1	John Hosman	Submission (rear-naked choke)	IHC 9: Purgatory	November 19, 2005	1	3:18	Hammond, Indiana, United States	
Win	5–4–1	Steve Hallock	TKO (punches)	Total Fight Challenge 4	September 17, 2005	2	4:40	Hammond, Indiana, United States	
Win	4–4–1	Chad Washburn	Submission (choke)	Duneland Classic 2	August 6, 2005	2	N/A	Portage, Indiana, United States	
Loss	3–4–1	Brandon Carlson	TKO (knee injury)	XKK: Xtreme Cage Combat	October 23, 2004	N/A	N/A	Curtiss, Wisconsin, United States	
Loss	3–3–1	Jim Bruketta	Submission (rear-naked choke)	Total Martial Arts Challenge 2	August 28, 2004	1	N/A	Hammond, Indiana, United States	
Win	3–2–1	Tim Panicucci	TKO (punches)	Freestyle Combat Challenge 14	March 6, 2004	1	4:56	Racine, Wisconsin, United States	
Win	2–2–1	Omar Choudhury	KO (knee)	Freestyle Combat Challenge 13	January 17, 2004	2	2:25	Racine, Wisconsin, United States	
Loss	1–2–1	Stonnie Dennis	Submission (heel hook)	HOOKnSHOOT: HOOKnSHOOT	September 13, 2003	1	1:53	Evansville, Indiana, United States	
Loss	1–1–1	Mustafa Hussaini	Submission (armbar)	Extreme Challenge 51	August 2, 2003	2	1:21	St. Charles, Illinois, United States	
Draw	1–0–1	Mustafa Hussaini	Draw	Shooto: Midwest Fighting	May 21, 2003	2	5:00	Hammond, Indiana, United States	
Win	1–0	Joel Cleverly	Submission	Maximum Combat 6	April 12, 2003	1	3:10	Fort Wayne, Indiana, United States	

== See also ==
- List of male mixed martial artists

== Notes ==
New championship	1st WEC Bantamweight Champion; May 5, 2006 - March 24, 2007	Succeeded by Chase Beebe
