= Will Campuzano =

Mexican mixed martial artist

- Born: William Campuzano; May 27, 1986 (age 40); Acapulco, Mexico
- Height: 5 ft 9 in (1.75 m)
- Weight: 135 lb (61 kg; 9.6 st)
- Division: Flyweight; Bantamweight
- Reach: 70.0 in (178 cm)
- Fighting out of: Frisco, Texas, United States
- Team: Campuzano Martial Arts, Team Alpha Male
- Rank: Purple Belt in Brazilian Jiu-Jitsu
- Years active: 2008–present

Mixed martial arts record
- Total: 20
- Wins: 14
- By knockout: 6
- By submission: 4
- By decision: 4
- Losses: 6
- By knockout: 1
- By submission: 2
- By decision: 3

Other information
- Mixed martial arts record from Sherdog

William Campuzano (born May 27, 1986) is a Mexican professional mixed martial artist currently competing in the Bantamweight division. A professional competitor since 2008, Campuzano has also formerly competed for the UFC, WEC, Vale Tudo Japan, and Legacy FC.

== Mixed martial arts career ==
=== Early career ===
Campuzano found his way into the world of mixed martial arts while attending college. "I used to fight a lot, like out on the street. When I was in college ... I took a Tae Kwon Do course where I met Tom Seabourne. He introduced me to Marcus Lanier who was a professional MMA fighter. He was looking for an assistant that could speak Spanish. He had just opened up his own school in Mount Pleasant. And that got me into MMA."

Campuzano won the first six fights of his MMA career, all by stoppage.

=== World Extreme Cagefighting ===
He made his WEC debut as a short-notice replacement against Damacio Page at WEC 43, filling in for an injured Akitoshi Tamura. Page submitted Campuzano in the first round.

In his next fight, Campuzano defeated Coty Wheeler on January 10, 2010, at WEC 46 via unanimous decision. The bout earned the Fight of the Night award.

Campuzano was expected to face Rafael Rebello on June 20, 2010, at WEC 49, but instead faced former WEC Bantamweight Champion Eddie Wineland. He lost the fight via TKO in the second round.

=== Ultimate Fighting Championship ===
In October 2010, World Extreme Cagefighting merged with the Ultimate Fighting Championship. As part of the merger, all WEC fighters were transferred to the UFC. Campuzano faced Nick Pace on December 4, 2010, at The Ultimate Fighter: Team GSP vs. Team Koscheck Finale. The fight was supposed to be the first bantamweight bout in UFC history, but Pace missed weight and the fight was changed to a catchweight bout. Campuzano lost the fight due to a pillory choke at 4:32 of round 3.

Campuzano faced Chris Cariaso on January 22, 2011, at UFC Fight Night 23. For the fight, Campuzano moved his fight camp to Sacramento, California with Urijah Faber and his team, Team Alpha Male. He lost the fight via unanimous decision and was subsequently released from the UFC.

=== Legacy Fighting Championship ===
Campuzano made his Legacy FC debut back in August 2008, when he defeated Seth Drago via guillotine choke submission at LFC 2: Anarchy. After a short stint in the UFC, he returned to Legacy FC and defeated Jimmy Flick in the main event of LFC 16 to become the inaugural Flyweight Champion.

Campuzano would successfully defend his Legacy FC title, when he defeated Allan Nascimento via unanimous decision at LFC 19 on April 12, 2013.

=== Return to the UFC ===
After going 5-0 since being released from the UFC, Campuzano returned to the Octagon as he stepped in on a one-week notice for the injured Vaughan Lee to take on Sergio Pettis. He lost the fight via unanimous decision.

Campuzano was expected to face Darrell Montague on March 15, 2014, at UFC 171. However, Montague pulled out of the bout citing an injury and was replaced by Justin Scoggins. He lost the fight via unanimous decision, and was subsequently released from the promotion once again.

=== Post career ===
After getting released from the UFC for a second time, Campuzano made a quick turnaround and faced Esdo de Paz at MMA 300: Salvador on May 24, 2014. He won the fight via triangle choke.

== Personal life ==
Campuzano lives with his wife and 2 sons in Frisco, Texas. He is the owner and head instructor of Campuzano Martial Arts, which is a 4,000 sf facility with 2 mats in Frisco, TX (Corner of Stonebrook & Teel).

== Championships and accomplishments ==
- Legacy Fighting Championship
- *LFC Flyweight Championship (One time)
- World Extreme Cagefighting
  - Fight of the Night (One time) vs. Coty Wheeler

== Mixed martial arts record ==
Professional record breakdown
20 matches	14 wins	6 losses
By knockout	6	1
By submission	4	2
By decision	4	3

Res.	Record	Opponent	Method	Event	Date	Round	Time	Location	Notes
Win	14–6	Esdo de Paz	Submission (triangle choke)	MMA 300: El Salvador	May 24, 2014	3	1:20	San Salvador, El Salvador	Bantamweight bout.
Loss	13–6	Justin Scoggins	Decision (unanimous)	UFC 171	March 15, 2014	3	5:00	Dallas, Texas, United States	
Loss	13–5	Sergio Pettis	Decision (unanimous)	UFC 167	November 16, 2013	3	5:00	Las Vegas, Nevada, United States	Bantamweight bout.
Win	13–4	Hideo Tokoro	Decision (split)	Vale Tudo Japan 3rd	October 5, 2013	3	5:00	Tokyo, Japan	
Win	12–4	Allan Nascimento	Decision (unanimous)	Legacy FC 19	April 12, 2013	5	5:00	Dallas, Texas, United States	Defended the Legacy FC Flyweight Championship.
Win	11–4	Jimmy Flick	TKO (knee and punches)	Legacy FC 16	December 13, 2012	2	0:26	Dallas, Texas, United States	Won the inaugural Legacy FC Flyweight Championship.
Win	10–4	Joshua Sampo	KO (knee)	Rumble Time Promotions: Campuzano vs. Sampo	May 19, 2012	3	1:18	St. Charles, Missouri, United States	
Win	9–4	Randy Hinds	Submission (rear-naked choke)	24/7 Entertainment 1	April 8, 2011	1	2:18	Midland, Texas, United States	Flyweight debut.
Loss	8–4	Chris Cariaso	Decision (unanimous)	UFC: Fight for the Troops 2	January 22, 2011	3	5:00	Fort Hood, Texas, United States	
Loss	8–3	Nick Pace	Submission (pillory choke)	The Ultimate Fighter 12 Finale	December 4, 2010	3	4:32	Las Vegas, Nevada, United States	Catchweight (138 lb) bout; Pace missed weight.
Win	8–2	Steve Garcia	Decision (split)	King of Kombat 9	August 20, 2010	3	5:00	Austin, Texas, United States	
Loss	7–2	Eddie Wineland	KO (punch to the body)	WEC 49	June 20, 2010	2	4:44	Edmonton, Alberta, Canada	
Win	7–1	Coty Wheeler	Decision (unanimous)	WEC 46	January 10, 2010	3	5:00	Sacramento, California, United States	Fight of the Night.
Loss	6–1	Damacio Page	Submission (rear-naked choke)	WEC 43	October 10, 2009	1	1:02	San Antonio, Texas, United States	
Win	6–0	Tim Snyder	TKO (punches)	Urban Rumble Championship 4	May 23, 2009	1	2:59	Pasadena, Texas, United States	
Win	5–0	Bryan Goldsby	Submission (triangle choke)	Cage Kings: Total Domination	March 20, 2009	2	1:32	Bossier City, Louisiana, United States	
Win	4–0	Doug Sonier	TKO (punches)	Supreme Warrior Championship 3	February 21, 2009	1	1:36	Frisco, Texas, United States	
Win	3–0	Jason Horak	KO (punches)	Cage Kings: Destruction at the Dome	October 10, 2008	2	0:38	Bossier City, Louisiana, United States	
Win	2–0	Seth Drago	Submission (guillotine choke)	Louisiana FC 2	August 23, 2008	1	1:28	Baton Rouge, Louisiana, United States	
Win	1–0	Trevor Robbins	TKO (punches)	Cage Kings 1	July 18, 2008	1	0:48	Bossier City, Louisiana, United States	Bantamweight debut.

== See also ==
- List of Mexican UFC fighters
- List of male mixed martial artists
