= Damacio Page =

American mixed martial arts (MMA) fighter

- Born: September 30, 1982 (age 44); Albuquerque, New Mexico, U.S.
- Other names: The Angel of Death
- Height: 5 ft 6 in (1.68 m)
- Weight: 135 lb (61 kg; 9.6 st)
- Division: Bantamweight; Lightweight
- Reach: 66 in (168 cm)
- Style: Kickboxing, Karate, Freestyle wrestling
- Fighting out of: Albuquerque, New Mexico, United States
- Team: Jackson's Submission Fighting
- Years active: 2005–2015

Mixed martial arts record
- Total: 29
- Wins: 19
- By knockout: 11
- By submission: 7
- By decision: 1
- Losses: 10
- By submission: 8
- By decision: 2

Other information
- Website: http://www.damaciopage.com
- Mixed martial arts record from Sherdog
- Last updated on: March 10, 2010

Damacio Page (born September 30, 1982) is an American former professional mixed martial artist who competed in the Bantamweight division. Page competed for the WEC, the UFC, LFA, Pancrase, King of the Cage, and also fought at K-1 Premium Dynamite 2006!!.

== Background ==
Page was born and raised in the West Side of Albuquerque, New Mexico. Page's parents divorced when he was five years old and he began kickboxing and karate at the age of nine. Page often caused trouble in school, getting into fights and being placed in special education classes for his behavior-disorder. In his sophomore year at West Mesa High School, Page began wrestling and would go on to be a state champion before earning a scholarship to compete for Fresno State University. However, one night three months into his first semester at Fresno State, Page was attacked by eight gang members who left him severely hurt and barely conscious. Because of the incident and transgressions in the past, Page was kicked off of the wrestling team and subsequently lost his scholarship. After the incident, Page found Jackson's Submission Fighting and also continued collegiate wrestling for Cerritos College in Norwalk, California. At Cerritos, Page was a junior college All-American, finishing third in the state during his freshman year and became a state champion in his sophomore year.

== Mixed martial arts career ==
=== Early career ===
Page made his professional mixed martial arts debut on February 5, 2005, for the King of the Cage organization. He disposed of his opponent, Will Tolliver, in the first round of their bout with strikes.

After claiming victory in his next two bouts, Page fought and defeated Scott Johnson for the WEF Super Lightweight Championship.

An impressive victory over Stephane Vigneault followed, before Page suffered his first professional defeat. The loss came in his Pancrase debut where he was handled by Japanese fighter, Miki Shida.

Page closed out 2006 with four more fights, winning the first two by TKO but losing the final two by submission to Danny Batten in September and then UFC veteran and Japanese superstar, Genki Sudo on New Year's Eve in K-1.

Fighting just the once in 2007, Page knocked out Rod Montoya at an Extreme Challenge event to improve his record to 6-3.

=== World Extreme Cagefighting ===
In 2008, Page signed on to fight for the WEC. He made his debut in a Bantamweight bout against Scott Jorgensen at WEC 32. Page slugged out a unanimous decision victory after three rounds.

Six months later, Page faced the undefeated Brian Bowles and was submitted in short order with a guillotine choke. Page later bounced back from his defeat by defeating #5 ranked Bantamweight fighter at the time, Marcos Galvao at WEC 39 via KO 18 seconds into the first round. He was scheduled to fight Akitoshi Tamura on October 10, 2009, at WEC 43, but Tamura was forced to pull out due to an injury while training. Tamura was replaced by WEC newcomer Will Campuzano. Page defeated Campuzano via first round submission.

Page was expected to face Takeya Mizugaki on December 19, 2009, at WEC 45, but was forced to withdraw from the card due to injury.

Page was scheduled to face Antonio Banuelos on April 24, 2010, at WEC 48, but Page was forced off the card with another injury. Banuelos will now face Scott Jorgensen in a rematch of their bout from WEC 41 which Banuelos won via split decision.

Page was expected to face Eddie Wineland on November 11, 2010, at WEC 52. However, Wineland was forced out of the bout with a shoulder injury and replaced by Demetrious Johnson. After largely controlling the first round against Johnson, Page seemed to visibly tire toward the end of the second and was defeated via third round submission. Page acknowledged that the long layoff may have contributed to his performance, but refused to blame his conditioning and gave credit to his opponent finishing him.

=== Ultimate Fighting Championship ===
On October 28, 2010, World Extreme Cagefighting merged with the Ultimate Fighting Championship. As part of the merger, all WEC fighters were transferred to the UFC.

Page faced former opponent Brian Bowles on March 3, 2011, at UFC Live: Sanchez vs. Kampmann, losing via first round guillotine choke for the second time against Bowles at exactly the same time as their first fight.

Page was expected to face Norifumi Yamamoto on September 24, 2011, at UFC 135. However, the bout was scrapped on September 1 after both fighters sustained injuries while training for the bout.

Page next faced Brad Pickett on April 14, 2012, at UFC on Fuel TV: Gustafsson vs. Silva. He lost the fight via submission in the second round.

Page then faced Alex Caceres on July 11, 2012, at UFC on Fuel TV: Munoz vs. Weidman. He lost the fight via submission in the second round.

Page was subsequently released from the UFC following his loss to Caceres.

=== Post UFC ===
Page faced previously undefeated Patrick Ybarra at Legacy Fighting Championship 20 on May 31, 2013. He won the bout via first round knockout. Page faced Matthew Lozano at Legacy Fighting Championship 28 on February 18, 2014. He won the fight via TKO (punches) in the second round.

=== The Ultimate Fighter ===
In July 2016, it was revealed that Page was a participant on The Ultimate Fighter: Tournament of Champions. Page was selected as a member of Team Cejudo. He faced Adam Antolin in the opening stage and lost the fight via TKO in the second round.

== Personal life ==
Damacio's body is decorated with multiple tattoos that all represent deep meaning in his life. Page is a religious man and claims the tattoos are a mosaic of his life. The flames on his feet represent his willingness to walk through hell in order to succeed in life. He is starting his own MMA promotion, Southwest Cage Fighting.

== Championships and accomplishments ==
- Ultimate Fighting Championship
  - Fight of the Night (One time) vs. Brad Pickett
- World Extreme Cagefighting
  - Knockout of the Night (One time) vs. Marcos Galvão
- Legacy Fighting Championships
  - LFC Flyweight champion (one time, current)
- MMA Junkie
  - 2014 October Knockout of the Month vs. Brian Hall
- Inside MMA
  - 2014 AXS TV Rising Star of the Year Bazzie Award
  - 2014 KO Punch of the Year Bazzie Award vs. Brian Hall at Legacy FC 36

== Mixed martial arts record ==
Professional record breakdown
29 matches	19 wins	10 losses
By knockout	11	0
By submission	7	8
By decision	1	2

Res.	Record	Opponent	Method	Event	Date	Round	Time	Location	Notes
Loss	19–10	Alexandre Pantoja	Technical Submission (triangle choke)	Legacy FC vs. RFA Superfight Card	May 8, 2015	2	5:00	Robinsonville, Mississippi, United States	Title vs. Title fight.
Win	19–9	Brian Hall	KO (punch)	Legacy FC 36	October 17, 2014	1	1:48	Albuquerque, New Mexico, United States	Won Legacy FC Flyweight Championship.
Win	18–9	Elias Garcia	Submission (arm-triangle choke)	Legacy FC 31	June 13, 2014	3	2:47	Houston, Texas, United States	
Win	17–9	Matt Lozano	TKO (punches)	Legacy FC 28	February 21, 2014	2	3:31	Arlington, Texas, United States	
Loss	16–9	Marcelo Costa	Decision (split)	Strength & Honor Championship 8	September 21, 2013	3	5:00	Geneva, Switzerland	
Win	16–8	Patrick Ybarra	KO (punch)	Legacy FC 20	May 31, 2013	1	1:57	Corpus Christi, Texas, United States	Flyweight debut.
Loss	15–8	Alex Caceres	Submission (triangle choke)	UFC on Fuel TV: Munoz vs. Weidman	July 11, 2012	2	1:27	San Jose, California, United States	
Loss	15–7	Brad Pickett	Submission (rear-naked choke)	UFC on Fuel TV: Gustafsson vs. Silva	April 14, 2012	2	4:05	Stockholm, Sweden	Fight of the Night.
Loss	15–6	Brian Bowles	Technical Submission (guillotine choke)	UFC Live: Sanchez vs. Kampmann	March 3, 2011	1	3:30	Louisville, Kentucky, United States	
Loss	15–5	Demetrious Johnson	Submission (guillotine choke)	WEC 52	November 11, 2010	3	2:27	Las Vegas, Nevada, United States	
Win	15–4	Will Campuzano	Submission (rear-naked choke)	WEC 43	October 10, 2009	1	1:02	San Antonio, Texas, United States	
Win	14–4	Marcos Galvão	KO (punches)	WEC 39	March 1, 2009	1	0:18	Corpus Christi, Texas, United States	Knockout of the Night.
Loss	13–4	Brian Bowles	Submission (guillotine choke)	WEC 35: Condit vs. Miura	August 3, 2008	1	3:30	Las Vegas, Nevada, United States	
Win	13–3	Scott Jorgensen	Decision (unanimous)	WEC 32: Condit vs. Prater	February 13, 2008	3	5:00	Rio Rancho, New Mexico, United States	
Win	12–3	Travis Sherman	Submission (rear-naked choke)	SCA: Duke City Final Fury	January 26, 2008	1	0:12	Albuquerque, New Mexico, United States	
Win	11–3	Richard Montano	TKO (punches)	SCA: Duke City Bike and Brawl	July 14, 2007	3	3:33	Albuquerque, New Mexico, United States	
Win	10–3	Anthony Jensen	TKO (punches)	SCA: Duke City Brawl	April 14, 2007	1	1:37	Albuquerque, New Mexico, United States	
Win	9–3	Rod Montoya	KO (elbows)	Extreme Challenge 74	March 10, 2007	1	2:32	Iowa City, Iowa, United States	
Loss	8–3	Genki Sudo	Submission (triangle choke)	K-1 Premium 2006 Dynamite!!	December 31, 2006	1	3:05	Osaka, Japan	Lightweight bout.
Loss	8–2	Danny Batten	Submission (armbar)	World Pro Fighting Championships	September 15, 2006	1	0:37	Las Vegas, Nevada, United States	
Win	8–1	Mark Haire	KO (punch)	Fightworld 10	August 19, 2006	1	0:06	Albuquerque, New Mexico, United States	
Win	7–1	Thierry Quenneville	KO (slam)	TKO 25: Confrontation	May 5, 2006	1	1:02	Montreal, Quebec, Canada	
Loss	6–1	Miki Shida	Decision (unanimous)	Pancrase: Blow 3	April 9, 2006	3	5:00	Tokyo, Japan	
Win	6–0	Zack Schroeder	Submission (armbar)	PNRF: Mayhem in Vegas	March 11, 2006	1	N/A	Las Vegas, Nevada, United States	
Win	5–0	Stephane Vigneault	KO (punch)	TKO 24: Eruption	January 28, 2006	1	1:20	Laval, Quebec, Canada	
Win	4–0	Scott Johnson	Submission (armbar)	World Extreme Fighting 16	September 24, 2005	1	0:30	Enid, Oklahoma, United States	
Win	3–0	Hyatto Kawabato	Submission (rear-naked choke)	PNRF: Demolition	June 18, 2005	2	1:46	Albuquerque, New Mexico, United States	
Win	2–0	Jeremy Floyd	Submission (rear-naked choke)	KOTC 50: First Blood	March 26, 2005	1	1:33	Socorro, New Mexico, United States	
Win	1–0	Will Tolliver	TKO (punches)	KOTC 47: Uprising	February 5, 2005	1	N/A	Albuquerque, New Mexico, United States	

=== Mixed martial arts exhibition record ===
Exhibition record breakdown		
1 match	0 wins	1 loss
By knockout	0	1

Res.	Record	Opponent	Method	Event	Date	Round	Time	Location	Notes
Loss	0–1	Adam Antolin	TKO (body kick and punches)	The Ultimate Fighter: Tournament of Champions	September 14, 2016	2	0:32	Las Vegas, Nevada, United States	TUF 24 Round of 16

*Date given is the air date of the episode. The actual dates of the fight are not released by the UFC
