= Miguel Torres (fighter) =

American mixed martial artist

- Born: January 18, 1981 (age 45); East Chicago, Indiana, United States
- Height: 5 ft 9 in (1.75 m)
- Weight: 145 lb (66 kg; 10 st 5 lb)
- Division: Bantamweight; Featherweight; Lightweight
- Reach: 76 in (193 cm)
- Team: Tristar Gym; Torres Martial Arts Academy; Jaco Hybrid Training Center (Blackzilians)
- Trainer: Firas Zahabi
- Rank: Black belt in Brazilian Jiu-Jitsu under Carlson Gracie Jr.
- Years active: 2000–2016

Mixed martial arts record
- Total: 53
- Wins: 44
- By knockout: 14
- By submission: 20
- By decision: 10
- Losses: 9
- By knockout: 3
- By submission: 3
- By decision: 3

Other information
- University: Purdue University
- Children: 2
- Website: www.torresmartialarts.com
- Mixed martial arts record from Sherdog

Miguel Torres (born January 18, 1981) is an American former mixed martial artist. He is a former WEC Bantamweight Champion and also formerly competed for the UFC and Ironheart Crown.

== Background ==
Torres was born and raised in East Chicago, Indiana. He began training in tae kwon do when he was seven years old and later attended East Chicago Central High School where he competed in wrestling. Torres also trained in boxing and Brazilian jiu-jitsu.

== Mixed martial arts career ==
=== Early career ===
For a number of years Torres fought primarily in small, unsanctioned events held in nightclubs and bars. As a result, much of his early fighting career is undocumented. Prior to signing with the WEC, he fought often on local shows, including the Total Fight Challenge and Ironheart Crown. He held the bantamweight title in both of these organizations for several years and his participation in those events is well documented.

After fighting for several years, Torres sought guidance and training under Carlson Gracie, Sr. As a trainer of many world champions, Gracie immediately recognized Torres's talent and took him on a trip to Brazil where he would publicly issue a challenge to the entire world. Long before Torres gained fame in the WEC, Gracie believed that no one could beat him at 135 pounds.

=== World Extreme Cagefighting ===
His first fight with the WEC came on September 5, 2007, against Jeff Bedard. Torres submitted Bedard in the first round with a triangle choke submission and then would go on to publicly request a title shot.

Torres would get one for his next fight and at WEC 32 he fought Chase Beebe for the WEC Bantamweight Championship. Torres displayed great striking and an equally impressive ground game and submitted Beebe in the first round to become the new WEC Bantamweight Champion.

Following his victory over Beebe, Torres successfully defended his title with back-to-back TKO victories; one over Yoshiro Maeda in an exciting fight and the other over the previously undefeated fellow Mexican-American Manny Tapia. It capped off a 2008 where Torres earned Breakthrough Fighter of the Year honors from Sherdog.com.

Torres was next expected to face Brian Bowles in the main event of WEC 40 on April 5, 2009, in Chicago, Illinois. However, Bowles injured and replaced by Japanese newcomer Takeya Mizugaki. Torres defeated Mizugaki by unanimous decision to retain his belt.

Bowles was ringside at WEC 40 and was called out by Torres after his five-round bout with Mizugaki. The fight headlined WEC 42 on August 9, 2009, at the Hard Rock Hotel and Casino in Las Vegas, Nevada. Torres started out strong, but he rushed Bowles wildly, resulting in Torres being knocked out in a huge upset. The loss snapped Torres' streak of 17 consecutive victories and marked his first loss in the Bantamweight division.

On March 6, 2010, at WEC 47, Torres faced and was defeated by Joseph Benavidez, via guillotine choke midway through the second round.

Torres faced Charlie Valencia on September 30, 2010, at WEC 51. He won the fight via submission in the second round.

=== Ultimate Fighting Championship ===
On October 28, 2010, the WEC merged with the UFC. As part of the merger, all WEC fighters were transferred to the UFC.

Torres made his promotional debut against fellow WEC veteran Antonio Banuelos on February 5, 2011, at UFC 126. He won the fight via unanimous decision.

Torres was expected to face English fighter Brad Pickett on May 28, 2011, at UFC 130. However, Pickett was forced out of the bout with an injury and replaced by future UFC Flyweight Champion Demetrious Johnson. Torres lost to Johnson via unanimous decision (29–28 on all cards). While taken down early in the first round, Torres controlled the first round, but in rounds two and three was outstruck and controlled on the ground, resulting in Johnson receiving the victory.

Torres faced Nick Pace on November 19, 2011, at UFC 139. He dominated Pace, winning a unanimous decision (30–27, 30–27, 30–27).

On December 8, 2011, it was announced by UFC president Dana White, in an interview with SI.com, that Torres had been cut from the UFC due to the following quote from the TV show Workaholics made on Torres' Twitter page: "If a rape van was called a surprise van more women wouldn't mind going for rides in them. Everyone likes surprises."

On December 28, 2011, it was announced by White after the UFC 141 press conference that Torres was back in the UFC. Regarding Torres' return, White stated that "Torres handled his business like a man and no one told him to do it."

Torres was knocked out by Michael McDonald on April 21, 2012, at UFC 145. After the loss he was once again released from the promotion.

=== World Series of Fighting ===
On September 6, 2012, it was announced that Torres was one of many fighters to sign on with the World Series of Fighting. Torres made his WSOF debut on November 3, 2012, at WSOF 1 against Bantamweight prospect Marlon Moraes, he lost via split decision.

For his second fight with the promotion, Torres fought on October 26, 2013, at WSOF 6 against Pablo Alfonso. He lost the fight via submission in the first round.

=== Independent Promotions ===
Torres signed with Indiana-based promotion "United Combat League" in early 2014. He faced Giovanni Moljo in his debut fight on February 15, 2014. Torres won the fight via unanimous decision, snapping his three fight losing streak in the process. He then faced Wade Choate at UCL: Torres vs. Choate on May 31, 2014. He won the fight via guillotine choke submission.

Torres faced Takahiro Ashida at Rebel FC 2 on August 1, 2014. He won the fight via split decision.

=== GLORY ===
Torres signed with the GLORY kickboxing promotion's Featherweight (-65 kg/143 lb) division in May 2014. He was expected to compete in the Glory 17: Los Angeles - Featherweight Contendership Tournament in Inglewood, California on June 21, 2014 but withdrew for undisclosed reasons and was replaced by Marcus Vinicius.

=== Titan Fighting Championship ===
In early October 2014, it was announced that Torres had signed a contract with Titan Fighting Championship. He made his debut on October 31, 2014, in the main event at Titan FC 31 against Desmond Green. Torres lost the fight via knockout in the first round.

== Training ==
Torres owns and operates a mixed martial arts academy in Griffith, Indiana where he teaches nearly 300 students. Among these students are several up and coming fighters whom he trains to fight in the same local shows that he once competed in himself. The academy specializes in Brazilian Jiu-Jitsu.

An article on Yahoo! discussed Torres' commitment to MMA, stating that before fights he sleeps and eats in his gym While Torres was essentially his own coach and ran his own training camps over the duration of his career, after his loss to Brian Bowles, Torres stated that he planned to revamp his training methods by working with several professional coaches, including Mark DellaGrotte.

== Personal life ==
Miguel Torres is divorced and has a daughter born in 2007.

Many fans have discussed the evolution of Torres' hairstyle; Torres stated in an interview that he adopted his iconic mullet from his father. Torres went on to say that, his father's mullet "is much more awesome than mine" and that the mullet "is a Mexican thing."

== Championships and accomplishments ==
- World Extreme Cagefighting
  - WEC Bantamweight Championship (One time)
    - Three successful title defenses
  - Fight of the Night (Two times)
  - Submission of the Night (One time)
- Sports Illustrated
  - 2008 Fight of the Year vs. Yoshiro Maeda at WEC 34
- Sherdog
  - Breakthrough Fighter of the Year (2008)
- Bloody Elbow
  - 2008 #2 Ranked Fighter of the Year
- MMA Fighting
  - 2008 #2 Ranked UFC Fight of the Year vs. Yoshiro Maeda at WEC 34

== Mixed martial arts record ==
Professional record breakdown
| 53 matches | 44 wins | 9 losses |
| By knockout | 14 | 3 |
| By submission | 20 | 3 |
| By decision | 10 | 3 |

| Res. | Record | Opponent | Method | Event | Date | Round | Time | Location | Notes |
|---|---|---|---|---|---|---|---|---|---|
| Win | 44–9 | Lloyd Carter | Submission (guillotine choke) | United Combat League: Havoc In Hammond 3 | September 24, 2016 | 1 | 2:44 | Hammond, Indiana, United States | |
| Loss | 43–9 | Kleber Koike Erbst | Submission (brabo choke) | Rebel FC 3: The Promised Ones | June 27, 2015 | 2 | 4:40 | Qingdao, China | Rebel FC Featherweight Tournament Finals. |
| Loss | 43–8 | Desmond Green | KO (knee and punches) | Titan FC 31 | October 31, 2014 | 1 | 0:46 | Tampa, Florida, United States | |
| Win | 43–7 | Takahiro Ashida | Decision (split) | Rebel FC 2: Battle Royal | August 1, 2014 | 3 | 5:00 | Marina Bay, Singapore | Rebel FC Featherweight Tournament Quarterfinal. |
| Win | 42–7 | Wade Choate | Submission (guillotine choke) | United Combat League: Torres vs. Choate | May 31, 2014 | 1 | 1:19 | Hammond, Indiana, United States | Catchweight (140 lbs) bout. |
| Win | 41–7 | Giovanni Moljo | Decision (unanimous) | United Combat League: Havoc in Hammond | February 15, 2014 | 3 | 5:00 | Hammond, Indiana, United States | Catchweight (140 lbs) bout. |
| Loss | 40–7 | Pablo Alfonso | Submission (guillotine choke) | WSOF 6 | October 26, 2013 | 1 | 3:05 | Coral Gables, Florida, United States | Featherweight bout. |
| Loss | 40–6 | Marlon Moraes | Decision (split) | WSOF 1 | November 3, 2012 | 3 | 5:00 | Las Vegas, Nevada, United States | |
| Loss | 40–5 | Michael McDonald | KO (punches) | UFC 145 | April 21, 2012 | 1 | 3:18 | Atlanta, Georgia, United States | |
| Win | 40–4 | Nick Pace | Decision (unanimous) | UFC 139 | November 19, 2011 | 3 | 5:00 | San Jose, California, United States | Catchweight (141 lbs) bout; Pace missed weight. |
| Loss | 39–4 | Demetrious Johnson | Decision (unanimous) | UFC 130 | May 28, 2011 | 3 | 5:00 | Las Vegas, Nevada, United States | |
| Win | 39–3 | Antonio Banuelos | Decision (unanimous) | UFC 126 | February 5, 2011 | 3 | 5:00 | Las Vegas, Nevada, United States | |
| Win | 38–3 | Charlie Valencia | Submission (rear-naked choke) | WEC 51 | September 30, 2010 | 2 | 2:25 | Broomfield, Colorado, United States | Submission of the Night. |
| Loss | 37–3 | Joseph Benavidez | Submission (guillotine choke) | WEC 47 | March 6, 2010 | 2 | 2:57 | Columbus, Ohio, United States | |
| Loss | 37–2 | Brian Bowles | KO (punches) | WEC 42 | August 9, 2009 | 1 | 3:57 | Las Vegas, Nevada, United States | Lost the WEC Bantamweight Championship. |
| Win | 37–1 | Takeya Mizugaki | Decision (unanimous) | WEC 40 | April 5, 2009 | 5 | 5:00 | Chicago, Illinois, United States | Defended WEC Bantamweight Championship. Fight of the Night. |
| Win | 36–1 | Manny Tapia | TKO (punches & elbows) | WEC 37 | December 3, 2008 | 2 | 3:04 | Las Vegas, Nevada, United States | Defended the WEC Bantamweight Championship. Broke the record for the most consecutive WEC Bantamweight Championship title defenses (2). |
| Win | 35–1 | Yoshiro Maeda | TKO (doctor stoppage) | WEC 34 | June 1, 2008 | 3 | 5:00 | Sacramento, California, United States | Defended the WEC Bantamweight Championship. Fight of the Night. |
| Win | 34–1 | Chase Beebe | Submission (guillotine choke) | WEC 32 | February 13, 2008 | 1 | 3:59 | Rio Rancho, New Mexico, United States | Won the WEC Bantamweight Championship. |
| Win | 33–1 | Jeff Bedard | Submission (triangle choke) | WEC 30 | September 5, 2007 | 1 | 2:30 | Las Vegas, Nevada, United States | |
| Win | 32–1 | Darius Turcinskas | Submission (rear-naked choke) | IMMAC 2: Attack | April 21, 2007 | 2 | 0:57 | Chicago, Illinois, United States | |
| Win | 31–1 | Charles Wilson | Submission (triangle choke) | TFC: Total Fight Challenge 7 | February 10, 2007 | 3 | 1:29 | Hammond, Indiana, United States | |
| Win | 30–1 | Bobby Gamboa | Submission (rear-naked choke) | AFC 19: Absolution Fighting Championships 19 | September 9, 2006 | 1 | 2:52 | Boca Raton, Florida, United States | |
| Win | 29–1 | Derek Collins | TKO (punches) | TFC: Total Fight Challenge 6 | May 5, 2006 | 1 | 2:32 | Hammond, Indiana, United States | |
| Win | 28–1 | Richard Nancoo | TKO (punches) | IHC 10: Tempest | April 29, 2006 | 2 | N/A | Hammond, Indiana, United States | |
| Win | 27–1 | Joe Pearson | Submission (triangle choke) | TFC: Total Fight Challenge 5 | February 18, 2006 | 1 | 0:28 | Hammond, Indiana, United States | |
| Win | 26–1 | Ryan Ackerman | Submission (armbar) | IHC 9: Purgatory | November 19, 2005 | 1 | 4:45 | Hammond, Indiana, United States | |
| Win | 25–1 | Dan Swift | Decision (unanimous) | TFC: Total Fight Challenge 3 | May 21, 2005 | 3 | 5:00 | Hammond, Indiana, United States | |
| Win | 24–1 | Mike French | Submission (triangle choke) | SB 40: Superbrawl 40 | April 30, 2005 | 2 | 2:44 | Hammond, Indiana, United States | |
| Win | 23–1 | Jim Bruketta | Submission (triangle choke) | TFC: Total Fight Challenge 2 | February 19, 2005 | 2 | 2:08 | Hammond, Indiana, United States | |
| Win | 22–1 | Alex Khanbabian | Submission (armbar) | IHC 8: Ethereal | November 20, 2004 | 1 | 1:01 | Hammond, Indiana, United States | |
| Win | 21–1 | Mustafa Hussaini | TKO (punches) | IHC 7: The Crucible | June 5, 2004 | 3 | 1:24 | Hammond, Indiana, United States | |
| Loss | 20–1 | Ryan Ackerman | Decision (unanimous) | IHC 6: Inferno | November 22, 2003 | 3 | 5:00 | Hammond, Indiana, United States | |
| Win | 20–0 | Lindsey Durlacher | Decision (unanimous) | IHC 4: Armageddon | May 18, 2002 | 3 | 5:00 | Hammond, Indiana, United States | |
| Win | 19–0 | Brian Szohr | Submission (triangle choke) | TCC: Battle of the Badges | April 13, 2002 | 1 | 3:36 | Hammond, Indiana, United States | |
| Win | 18–0 | Craig Williamson | Submission (triangle choke) | TCC: Battle of the Badges | April 13, 2002 | 1 | 2:45 | Hammond, Indiana, United States | |
| Win | 17–0 | Steve Reyna | TKO (doctor stoppage) | IHC 3: Exodus | November 10, 2001 | 1 | 5:00 | Hammond, Indiana, United States | |
| Win | 16–0 | Nick Mitchell | Decision (unanimous) | IHC 3: Exodus | November 10, 2001 | 2 | 5:00 | Hammond, Indiana, United States | |
| Win | 15–0 | Danny Long | KO (punches) | TCC: Total Combat Challenge | September 29, 2001 | 1 | N/A | Hammond, Indiana, United States | |
| Win | 14–0 | Patrick Rodriguez | Submission | FFCC: Finke's Full Contact Challenge | April 30, 2001 | 2 | 1:41 | Highland, Indiana, United States | |
| Win | 13–0 | Josh Mason | TKO (submission to punches) | Cage Rage 2 | April 14, 2001 | 2 | N/A | Kokomo, Indiana, United States | |
| Win | 12–0 | Mark Jaromillo | Submission (armbar) | FFCC: Finke's Full Contact Challenge | March 26, 2001 | 2 | 2:40 | Highland, Indiana, United States | |
| Win | 11–0 | David Odle | TKO (submission to punches) | FFCC: Finke's Full Contact Challenge | February 26, 2001 | 1 | 2:05 | Highland, Indiana, United States | |
| Win | 10–0 | Danny Alexander | Submission (rear-naked choke) | FFCC: Finke's Full Contact Challenge | January 29, 2001 | 1 | 0:58 | Highland, Indiana, United States | |
| Win | 9–0 | Jesse Gudenschwagger | TKO (doctor stoppage) | MMA Invitational 4 | November 18, 2000 | 2 | 5:00 | Hammond, Indiana, United States | |
| Win | 8–0 | Chad Bratton | Decision (unanimous) | ES: Extreme Shootfighting | September 30, 2000 | 1 | 15:00 | Indianapolis, Indiana, United States | |
| Win | 7–0 | Ricky Olson | Decision (unanimous) | ES: Extreme Shootfighting | September 30, 2000 | 1 | 15:00 | Indianapolis, Indiana, United States | |
| Win | 6–0 | Cory Merriman | TKO (submission to punches) | ES: Extreme Shootfighting | September 30, 2000 | 1 | 1:27 | Indianapolis, Indiana, United States | |
| Win | 5–0 | Dan Caesar | TKO (submission to punches) | FFCC: Finke's Full Contact Challenge | August 28, 2000 | 1 | 4:30 | Highland, Indiana, United States | |
| Win | 4–0 | Kris Kramer | Submission (triangle choke) | FFCC: Finke's Full Contact Challenge | July 28, 2000 | 1 | 3:00 | Highland, Indiana, United States | |
| Win | 3–0 | Michael Reyna | TKO (submission to punches) | FFCC: Finke's Full Contact Challenge | May 22, 2000 | 1 | 1:22 | Highland, Indiana, United States | |
| Win | 2–0 | Dan Caesar | Submission (guillotine choke) | FFCC: Finke's Full Contact Challenge | April 24, 2000 | 1 | 4:09 | Highland, Indiana, United States | |
| Win | 1–0 | Larry Pulliam | TKO (punches) | FFCC: Finke's Full Contact Challenge | March 27, 2000 | 1 | 0:10 | Highland, Indiana, United States | |

== Kickboxing record ==
0 wins (0 KOs), 1 losses, 0 draw
| Date | Result | Opponent | Event | Location | Method | Round | Time | Record |
|---|---|---|---|---|---|---|---|---|
| 2015-01-16 | Loss | (United States) Angel Huerta | Legacy Kickboxing 1 | Houston, Texas, USA | Decision (unanimous) | 3 | 3:00 | 0–1 |

| Preceded by Chase Beebe | 3rd WEC Bantamweight Champion; February 13, 2008 – August 9, 2009 | Succeeded by Brian Bowles |
