= UFC Fight Night: McDonald vs. Lineker =

UFC mixed martial arts event in 2016

- The poster for UFC Fight Night: McDonald vs. Lineker
- Promotion: Ultimate Fighting Championship
- Date: July 13, 2016
- Venue: Denny Sanford Premier Center
- City: Sioux Falls, South Dakota
- Attendance: 5,671
- Total gate: $381,945

Event chronology
UFC 200: Tate vs. Nunes	UFC Fight Night: McDonald vs. Lineker	UFC on Fox: Holm vs. Shevchenko

UFC Fight Night: McDonald vs. Lineker (also known as UFC Fight Night 91) was a mixed martial arts event produced by the Ultimate Fighting Championship held on July 13, 2016, at Denny Sanford Premier Center in Sioux Falls, South Dakota.

== Background ==
This was the first UFC event under the ownership of a group led by Endeavor which included Silver Lake Partners, Kohlberg Kravis Roberts, and MSD Capital; their purchase of Zuffa was announced two days earlier. The event also was the first that the organization has hosted in South Dakota.

A lightweight bout between The Ultimate Fighter winners was scheduled to headline the event, as The Ultimate Fighter: Team Lesnar vs. Team dos Santos winner Tony Ferguson was expected to face The Ultimate Fighter: Live winner Michael Chiesa. However, Chiesa pulled out due to a back injury on June 27. On the following day, it was announced that promotional newcomer Lando Vannata would replace him and the bout would be moved to the co-main event, as a bantamweight bout between former interim UFC Bantamweight Championship challenger Michael McDonald and John Lineker was revealed as the new headliner.

Alex White was expected to face The Ultimate Fighter: Team McGregor vs. Team Faber winner Ryan Hall, but pulled out on June 28 due to an undisclosed injury. Hall elected to fight on a different date rather than have the promotion find him a replacement.

== Results ==
Main Card (Fox Sports 1)
Weight class				Method	Round	Time	Notes
Bantamweight	John Lineker	def.	Michael McDonald	KO (punches)	1	2:43
Lightweight	Tony Ferguson	def.	Lando Vannata	Submission (D'Arce choke)	2	2:22
Middleweight	Tim Boetsch	def.	Josh Samman	TKO (punches)	2	3:49
Heavyweight	Daniel Omielańczuk	def.	Aleksei Oleinik	Decision (majority) (28–28, 29–28, 29–28)	3	5:00
Welterweight	Keita Nakamura	def.	Kyle Noke	Submission (rear-naked choke)	2	4:59
Flyweight	Louis Smolka	def.	Ben Nguyen	TKO (punches and elbows)	2	4:41
Preliminary Card (Fox Sports 1)
Women's Bantamweight	Katlyn Chookagian	def.	Lauren Murphy	Decision (unanimous) (29–28, 29–28, 29–28)	3	5:00
Middleweight	Sam Alvey	def.	Eric Spicely	Submission (guillotine choke)	1	2:43
Women's Strawweight	Cortney Casey	def.	Cristina Stanciu	TKO (elbows)	1	2:36
Lightweight	Scott Holtzman	def.	Cody Pfister	Decision (unanimous) (30–27, 30–27, 29–28)	3	5:00
Preliminary Card (UFC Fight Pass)
Bantamweight	Rani Yahya	def.	Matthew Lopez	Submission (arm-triangle choke)	3	4:19
Middleweight	Alex Nicholson	def.	Devin Clark	KO (punch)	1	4:57

== Bonus awards ==
The following fighters were awarded $50,000 bonuses:

- Fight of the Night: Tony Ferguson vs. Lando Vannata
- Performance of the Night: John Lineker and Louis Smolka

== See also ==
- List of UFC events
- 2016 in UFC
