= WEC 30 =

WEC MMA event in 2007

WEC 30: McCullough vs. Crunkilton
- The poster for WEC 30: McCullough vs. Crunkilton
- Promotion: World Extreme Cagefighting
- Date: September 5, 2007
- Venue: Hard Rock Hotel and Casino
- City: Las Vegas, Nevada

Event chronology
| WEC 29: Condit vs. Larson | WEC 30: McCullough vs. Crunkilton | WEC 31: Faber vs. Curran |

WEC 30: McCullough vs. Crunkilton was a mixed martial arts (MMA) event held by World Extreme Cagefighting (WEC). The event took place on Wednesday, September 5, 2007 at the Hard Rock Hotel and Casino in Las Vegas, Nevada and aired live on the Versus Network.

The event featured a lightweight title match between champion "Razor" Rob McCullough and Richard Crunkilton. Additionally, Chase Beebe defended his bantamweight title against Brazilian jiu-jitsu expert Rani Yahya, who replaced Manny Tapia on the card after Tapia suffered a knee injury.

Former UFC Lightweight Champion Jens Pulver was scheduled to make his WEC & featherweight debut at this event against Cub Swanson, but was pulled from the card due to a knee injury. The matchup was rescheduled for WEC 31 three months later, where Pulver won by submission.

Sergio Gomez was originally slated to face WEC newcomer Donald Cerrone at this event, but was later pulled from the card and replaced by the debuting Kenneth Alexander.

Kevin Knabjian was expected to face Blas Avena at this event, but was later replaced by WEC newcomer Joe Benoit

== Results ==
Main card
| Weight class | | | | Method | Round | Time | Notes |
|---|---|---|---|---|---|---|---|
| Lightweight | Rob McCullough (c) | def | Richard Crunkilton | TKO (strikes) | 1 | 1:29 | (Note: For the Lightweight championship.) |
| Bantamweight | Chase Beebe (c) | def | Rani Yahya | Decision (unanimous) (49–46, 49–46, 49–45) | 5 | 5:00 | (Note: For the Bantamweight championship.) |
| Light Heavyweight | Brian Stann | def | Jeremiah Billington | TKO (strikes) | 1 | 3:07 |
| Bantamweight | Miguel Torres | def | Jeff Bedard | Submission (triangle choke) | 1 | 2:30 |
Preliminary card
| Welterweight | John Alessio | def | Marcelo Brito | Decision (unanimous) (30–27, 30–27, 30–27) | 3 | 5:00 |
| Lightweight | Marcus Hicks | def | Scott McAfee | Submission (guillotine choke) | 1 | 2:13 |
| Middleweight | Bryan Baker | def | Jesse Forbes | TKO (strikes) | 1 | 4:15 | (Note: Although preliminary, this bout aired on the live broadcast.) |
| Lightweight | Donald Cerrone | def | Kenneth Alexander | Submission (triangle neck crank) | 1 | 0:56 | (Note: This was later overturned after Cerrone tested positive for a banned substance.) |
| Welterweight | Blas Avena | def | Joe Benoit | Submission (guillotine choke) | 1 | 0:29 | (Note: Although preliminary, this bout aired on the live broadcast.) |
| Bantamweight | Ian McCall | def | Coty Wheeler | TKO (strikes) | 1 | 4:43 |

== Reported Payout ==
The following is the reported payout to the fighters as reported to the Nevada State Athletic Commission. It does not include sponsor money or "locker room" bonuses often given by the WEC.

- Rob McCullough: $24,000 (includes $12,000 win bonus) def. Richard Crunkilton: $10,000
- Chase Beebe: $10,000 ($5,000 win bonus) def. Rani Yahya: $6,000
- Brian Stann: $10,000 ($5,000 win bonus) def. Jeremiah Billington $2,000
- Miguel Torres: $20,000 ($10,000 win bonus) def. Jeff Bedard $4,000
- John Alessio: $22,000 ($11,000 win bonus) def. Marcelo Brito: $3,000
- Marcus Hicks: $8,000 ($4,000 win bonus) def. Scott McAfee: $2,000
- Bryan Baker: $6,000 ($3,000 win bonus) def. Jesse Forbes: $4,000
- Donald Cerrone: $6,000 ($3,000 win bonus) def. Kenneth Alexander: $3,000
- Blas Avena: $6,000 ($3,000 win bonus) def. Joe Benoit: $2,000
- Ian McCall: $4,000 ($2,000 win bonus) def. Coty Wheeler: $2,000

== See also ==
- World Extreme Cagefighting
- List of WEC champions
- List of WEC events
- 2007 in WEC
