= WEC 34 =

WEC MMA event in 2008

WEC 34: Faber vs. Pulver
- The poster for WEC 34: Faber vs. Pulver
- Promotion: World Extreme Cagefighting
- Date: June 1, 2008
- Venue: ARCO Arena
- City: Sacramento, California
- Attendance: 12,682
- Total gate: $738,855

Event chronology
WEC 33: Marshall vs. Stann	WEC 34: Faber vs. Pulver	WEC 35: Condit vs. Miura

WEC 34: Faber vs. Pulver was a mixed martial arts event held by World Extreme Cagefighting that took place on June 1, 2008, at the ARCO Arena in Sacramento, California. The main event, announced on WEC 33, was a bout between Jens Pulver and Urijah Faber for the WEC Featherweight Championship. WEC 34 was aired live on Versus.

== Background ==
The event drew an estimated 1,540,000 viewers on Versus, a record high for the WEC.

Richard Crunkilton was originally slated to face Donald Cerrone at this event, but he was forced from the bout with an injury and replaced by promotional newcomer Danny Castillo.

Eric Schambari was originally scheduled to face Tim McKenzie at this event, but was also injured and replaced by the debuting Jeremy Lang.

== Results ==
Main card
Weight class				Method	Round	Time	Notes
Featherweight	Urijah Faber (c)	def.	Jens Pulver	Decision (unanimous) (50-45, 50-44, 50-44)	5	5:00	(Note: For the WEC Featherweight Championship.)
Bantamweight	Miguel Torres (c)	def.	Yoshiro Maeda	TKO (doctor stoppage)	3	5:00	(Note: For the WEC Bantamweight Championship.)
Light Heavyweight	Mark Muñoz	def	Chuck Grigsby	KO (punches)	1	4:15
Lightweight	Rob McCullough	def	Kenneth Alexander	Decision (split) (30-27, 28-29, 30-27)	3	5:00
Preliminary card
Lightweight	Donald Cerrone	def	Danny Castillo	Submission (armbar)	1	1:30
Featherweight	Mike Brown	def	Jeff Curran	Decision (unanimous) (30-27, 30-27, 30-27)	3	5:00
Bantamweight	Will Ribeiro	def	Chase Beebe	Decision (split) (29-28, 28-29, 29-28)	3	5:00
Middleweight	Tim McKenzie	def	Jeremy Lang	Submission (triangle choke)	3	0:40
Welterweight	Alex Serdyukov	def	Luis Santos	TKO (injury)	1	5:00
Featherweight	José Aldo	def	Alexandre Franca Nogueira	TKO (punches)	2	3:22
Bantamweight	Dominick Cruz	def	Charlie Valencia	Decision (unanimous) (30-27, 29-28, 29-28)	3	5:00

== Reported payout ==
The following is the reported payout to the fighters as reported to the California State Athletic Commission. It does not include sponsor money or "locker room" bonuses often given by the WEC.

- Urijah Faber: $44,000 (includes $22,000 win bonus) def. Jens Pulver: $33,000
- Miguel Torres: $28,000 ($14,000 win bonus) def. Yoshiro Maeda: $6,000
- Mark Munoz: $16,000 ($8,000 win bonus) def. Chuck Grigsby: $3,000
- Rob McCullough: $32,000 ($16,000 win bonus) def. Kenneth Alexander: $3,000
- Donald Cerrone: $10,000 ($5,000 win bonus) def. Danny Castillo: $3,000
- Mike Brown: $10,000 ($5,000 win bonus) def. Jeff Curran: $10,000
- Will Ribeiro: $6,000 ($3,000 win bonus) def. Chase Beebe: $7,000
- Tim McKenzie: $12,000 ($6,000 win bonus) def. Jeremy Lang: $4,000
- Alex Serdyukov: $6,000 ($3,000 win bonus) def. Luis Sapo: $3,000
- José Aldo: $6,000 ($3,000 win bonus) def. Alexandre Franca Nogueira: $8,000
- Dominick Cruz: $6,000 ($3,000 win bonus) def. Charlie Valencia: $7,000

== See also ==
- World Extreme Cagefighting
- List of World Extreme Cagefighting champions
- List of WEC events
- 2008 in WEC
