= WEC 33 =

World Extreme Cagefighting mixed martial arts event in 2008

WEC 33: Marshall vs. Stann
- The poster for WEC 33: Marshall vs. Stann
- Promotion: World Extreme Cagefighting
- Date: March 26, 2008
- Venue: Hard Rock Hotel and Casino
- City: Paradise, Nevada

Event chronology
WEC 32: New Mexico	WEC 33: Marshall vs. Stann	WEC 34: Faber vs. Pulver

WEC 33: Marshall vs. Stann was a mixed martial arts (MMA) event held by World Extreme Cagefighting (WEC) on Wednesday, March 26, 2008.

== Background ==
A rematch for the WEC Middlweight Championship between champion Paulo Filho and Chael Sonnen was advertised for this event, but Filho dropped out three weeks prior to the fight for personal reasons. Sonnen remained on the card, and instead faced Bryan Baker, who was pulled from an undercard bout with Logan Clark to face Sonnen. Clark's new opponent was WEC newcomer Scott Harper. The Filho/Sonnen rematch was later rescheduled for WEC 36 in November 2008.

The event drew an estimated 549,000 viewers on Versus.

== Results ==
Main card
Weight class				Method	Round	Time	Notes
Light Heavyweight	Brian Stann	def.	Doug Marshall (c)	TKO (punches)	1	1:35	(Note: For the WEC Light Heavyweight Championship.)
Middleweight	Chael Sonnen	def	Bryan Baker	Decision (unanimous) (30-26, 30-25, 30-25)	3	5:00
Lightweight	Marcus Hicks	def	Ed Ratcliff	Submission (guillotine choke)	1	1:42
Light Heavyweight	Steve Cantwell	def	Tim McKenzie	Submission (rear-naked choke)	1	2:13
Preliminary card
Welterweight	Hiromitsu Miura	def	Blas Avena	KO (punches)	1	2:35
Welterweight	Brock Larson	def	John Alessio	Disqualification (illegal knee)	1	1:50
Lightweight	Richard Crunkilton	def	Sergio Gomez	Decision (unanimous) (30-26, 30-27, 29-28)	3	5:00
Welterweight	Alex Serdyukov	def	Ryan Stonitsch	Submission (triangle choke)	1	1:35
Bantamweight	Chris Manuel	vs.	Kenji Osawa	Draw (split) (28-29, 29-28, 28-28)	3	5:00
Middleweight	Logan Clark	def	Steve Harper	TKO (strikes)	1	4:37

== Reported payout ==
The following is the reported payout to the fighters as reported to the Nevada State Athletic Commission. It does not include sponsor money or "locker room" bonuses often given by the WEC.

- Brian Stann: $18,000 (includes $9,000 win bonus) def. Doug Marshall: $10,000
- Chael Sonnen: $34,000 ($17,000 win bonus) def. Bryan Baker: $5,000
- Marcus Hicks: $10,000 ($5,000 win bonus) def. Ed Ratcliff: $7,000
- Steve Cantwell: $8,000 ($4,000 win bonus) def. Tim McKenzie: $6,000
- Hiromitsu Miura: $8,000 ($4,000 win bonus) def. Blas Avena: $6,000
- Brock Larson: $24,000 ($12,000 win bonus) def. John Alessio: $15,000
- Rich Crunkilton: $20,000 ($10,000 win bonus) def. Sergio Gomez $4,000
- Alex Serdyukov: $12,000 ($6,000 win bonus) def. Ryan Stonitsch: $3,000
- Chris Manuel: $3,000 vs. Kenji Osawa: $5,000 ^
- Logan Clark: $12,000 ($6,000 win bonus) def. Scott Harper: $3,000

^Both fighters earned show money; bout declared majority draw.

== See also ==
- World Extreme Cagefighting
- List of World Extreme Cagefighting champions
- List of WEC events
- 2008 in WEC
