= Rani Yahya =

Brazilian martial artist

- Born: Rani Ahmad Yahya; September 12, 1984 (age 42); Brasília, Brazil
- Height: 5 ft 6 in (1.68 m)
- Weight: 135 lb (61 kg; 9.6 st)
- Division: Bantamweight; Featherweight; Lightweight
- Reach: 68 in (173 cm)
- Fighting out of: Brasília, Brazil
- Team: American Top Team; Constrictor Team
- Rank: 5th degree black belt in Brazilian Jiu-Jitsu under Athaíde Junior; Black belt in Muay Thai
- Years active: 2002–present

Mixed martial arts record
- Total: 42
- Wins: 28
- By submission: 21
- By decision: 7
- Losses: 12
- By knockout: 4
- By submission: 1
- By decision: 7
- Draws: 1
- No contests: 1

Other information
- Mixed martial arts record from Sherdog

Rani Yahya
Medal record

Representing Brazil

Submission Wrestling

ADCC World Championships
Silver medal – second place	2005 California, USA	-66 kg
Gold medal – first place	2007 New Jersey, USA	-66 kg

Brazilian jiu-jitsu

World Jiu-Jitsu Championship
Gold medal – first place	2003 Rio de Janeiro	-70kg (Brown)
Gold medal – first place	2002 Rio de Janeiro	-64kg (Purple)

Rani Ahmad Yahya (born September 12, 1984) is a Syrian-Brazilian mixed martial artist and BJJ practitioner. He won the 66 kg division of the ADCC Submission Wrestling World Championship in April 2007. He competes in the Bantamweight division of the Ultimate Fighting Championship.

== Background ==
Yahya was born to a Syrian father and Brazilian mother. He trained judo, taekwondo and karate in his childhood, finding Brazilian jiu-jitsu at the age of 11.

== Mixed martial arts career ==
=== World Extreme Cagefighting ===
Yahya made his WEC debut against former TKO Major League MMA featherweight champion Mark Hominick at WEC 28 on May 3, 2007. Yahya defeated Hominick in the first round with a rear naked choke.

He fought and lost to Chase Beebe via unanimous decision for the WEC bantamweight championship at WEC 30 on September 5, 2007, and earned Fight of the Night bonus.

On November 5, 2008, at WEC 36, Yahya fought Yoshiro Maeda and won via Submission in the first round and earned the Submission of the Night bônus.

Yahya fought former WEC Bantamweight Champion Eddie Wineland on the undercard of WEC 40 on April 5, 2009. He won via Submission in the first round and earned the Submission of the Night bônus.

Yahya was scheduled to fight Kenji Osawa on August 9, 2009, at WEC 42, but due to a foot injury suffered by Osawa, he was replaced by John Hosman. Yahya submitted Hosman with a north–south choke in the first round and earned his third consecutive Submission of the Night bonus.

Yahya fought Joseph Benavidez on December 19, 2009, at WEC 45. He lost the fight via TKO in the first round.

Yahya faced Takeya Mizugaki on April 24, 2010, at WEC 48. He lost the fight via unanimous decision.

=== Ultimate Fighting Championship ===
On October 28, 2010, World Extreme Cagefighting merged with the Ultimate Fighting Championship. As part of the merger, all WEC fighters were brought over to compete in the 2 new weight divisions.

Yahya was expected to face Chan Sung Jung on January 22, 2011, at UFC Fight Night 23. However, Jung was forced from the card with an injury. and replaced by Mike Brown. Yahya won the fight via unanimous decision.

Yahya was expected to face Dustin Poirier on June 11, 2011, at UFC 131, but had to pull out of the bout due to injury.

Yahya next faced Chad Mendes on August 6, 2011, at UFC 133. He lost the fight via unanimous decision.

Yahya was expected to face Jonathan Brookins on February 15, 2012, at UFC on Fuel TV 1, but was forced out of the bout with an injury.

Yahya fought Josh Grispi on August 4, 2012, at UFC on Fox: Shogun vs. Vera, replacing an injured Pablo Garza. Yahya was victorious, defeating Grispi in the first round with a north–south choke.

Yahya faced promotional newcomer Mizuto Hirota on March 3, 2013, at UFC on Fuel TV 8. He won the fight via unanimous decision.

Yahya next faced Josh Clopton on August 3, 2013, at UFC 163. He won the fight via unanimous decision.

Yahya faced promotional newcomer Tom Niinimäki on November 30, 2013, at The Ultimate Fighter 18 Finale. He lost the fight via split decision.

Yahya faced Johnny Bedford in a bantamweight bout on April 11, 2014, at UFC Fight Night 39. The bout ended in a No Contest as an accidental clash of heads rendered Yahya unable to protect himself, forcing a referee stoppage at 0:39 of round 1.

A rematch with Bedford was expected to take place on June 28, 2014, at UFC Fight Night: Swanson vs. Stephens. However, Yahya was forced out of the bout and replaced by Cody Gibson.

The rescheduled rematch with Bedford eventually took place on September 13, 2014, at UFC Fight Night 51. Yahya won via submission in the second round.

Yahya was expected to face Masanori Kanehara on June 27, 2015, at UFC Fight Night 70. However, as the event approached, several international fighters experienced travel restrictions due to technical issues within the Bureau of Consular Affairs division of the U.S. State Department which produces travel visas. The issue lead to a major altering of the card as multiple fights were postponed. Yahya/Kanehara eventually took place on July 15, 2015, at UFC Fight Night 71. Yahya won the fight by split decision.

Yahya next faced touted promotional newcomer Matthew Lopez on July 13, 2016, at UFC Fight Night 91. Yahya won the fight via submission in the third round.

Yahya faced Michinori Tanaka on September 24, 2016, at UFC Fight Night 95. He won the fight via unanimous decision.

Yahya faced Joe Soto on March 11, 2017, at UFC Fight Night 106. He lost the back-and-forth fight via unanimous decision.

Yahya faced Henry Briones on August 5, 2017, at UFC Fight Night: Pettis vs. Moreno. He won the fight via a kimura submission in the first round.

Yahya was expected to face Aljamain Sterling on December 9, 2017, at UFC Fight Night 123. However, Yahya pulled out of the event due to injury.

Yahya faced Russell Doane on February 24, 2018, at UFC on Fox 28. He won the fight via submission in the third round.

Yahya faced Luke Sanders on August 25, 2018, at UFC Fight Night 135. He won the fight via heel hook submission in the first round.

Yahya faced Ricky Simón on February 10, 2019, at UFC 234. He lost the fight via unanimous decision after being knocked down twice.

Yahya faced Enrique Barzola on March 14, 2020, at UFC Fight Night 170. After a back-and-forth three rounds, the judges declared the bout a majority draw decision.

Yahya faced Ray Rodriguez on March 13, 2021, replacing Irwin Rivera, at UFC Fight Night: Edwards vs. Muhammad. After dominating the fight with his takedowns and jiu-jitsu, Yahya won the fight via arm-triangle submission in the second round.

Yahya was scheduled to face Kang Kyung-ho on July 31, 2021, at UFC on ESPN 28. However the bout was cancelled a few hours before happening due to Yahya testing positive for COVID-19.

Yahya faced Kang Kyung-ho on November 20, 2021, at UFC Fight Night 198. He won the bout via unanimous decision.

Yahya was scheduled to face Cody Garbrandt on July 9, 2022, at UFC on ESPN 39. However, Yahya withdrew in mid June due to a neck injury. The bout with Garbrandt was rescheduled and is expected to take place on October 1, 2022, at UFC Fight Night 211. In turn, Yahya withdrew again in mid-September for unknown reasons.

Yahya faced Montel Jackson on April 22, 2023, at UFC Fight Night 222. He lost the fight via knockout in the first round.

Yahya was scheduled to face Alateng Heili on October 14, 2023, at UFC Fight Night 230. However, Yahya withdrew from the event for undisclosed reasons.

Yahya faced Victor Henry on April 27, 2024, at UFC on ESPN 55. After suffering two knockdowns, Yahya lost the bout by technical knockout in the third round.

== Grappling credentials ==
ADCC World Submission Wrestling Championships

ADCC 2007 –65 kg: 1st Place

ADCC 2005 –65 kg: 2nd Place

ADCC 2003 –65 kg: Quarter finals.

Record of opponents:

- Won: Teemu Launis (pts), Mario Delgado (pts), Wagney Fabiano (pts), Marcio Feitosa Souza (pts), Darell Moodley (sub), Bruno 'Chavez' Frazzato (Rear Naked Choke), Baret Yoshida (pts), Leo 'Leozinho' Vieira (Rear Naked Choke), Kohei Yasumi (sub), Jeff Glover (pts)
- Lost: Leonardo Viera (pts), Leonardo Viera (pts), Rubens "Cobrinha" Charles (sub)

IBJJJF/CBJJ World Championships

2019 Black Belt Pena Master: 1st Place

2003 Brown Belt Pena: 1st Place

2002 Purple Belt Pluma: 1st Place

1999 Pan-Ams + World Blue Belt : 1st Place

== Championships and accomplishments ==
=== Mixed martial arts ===
- K-1 HERO'S
  - 2006 K-1 HERO'S Lightweight Grand Prix Semifinalist
- TNT
  - TNT: Vale Tudo 2 Tournament Winner
- World Extreme Cagefighting
  - Submission of the Night (three times) vs. Mark Hominick, Yoshiro Maeda, Eddie Wineland and John Hosman
  - Fight of the Night (one time) vs. Chase Beebe
- Ultimate Fighting Championship
  - Tied (Urijah Faber) for the most submission wins in UFC Bantamweight division history (6)
  - Tied (Raoni Barcelos for second most submission attempts in UFC Bantamweight division history (14)
  - Fourth highest control time in UFC Bantamweight division history (57:20)
  - Third most top-position time in UFC Bantamweight division history (51:16)

== Mixed martial arts record ==
Professional record breakdown
42 matches	28 wins	12 losses
By knockout	0	4
By submission	21	1
By decision	7	7
Draws	1	
No contests	1	

Res.	Record	Opponent	Method	Event	Date	Round	Time	Location	Notes
Loss	28–12–1 (1)	Victor Henry	TKO (head kick and punches)	UFC on ESPN: Nicolau vs. Perez	April 27, 2024	3	2:36	Las Vegas, Nevada, United States	
Loss	28–11–1 (1)	Montel Jackson	KO (punches)	UFC Fight Night: Pavlovich vs. Blaydes	April 22, 2023	1	3:42	Las Vegas, Nevada, United States	
Win	28–10–1 (1)	Kang Kyung-ho	Decision (unanimous)	UFC Fight Night: Vieira vs. Tate	November 20, 2021	3	5:00	Las Vegas, Nevada, United States	
Win	27–10–1 (1)	Ray Rodriguez	Submission (arm-triangle choke)	UFC Fight Night: Edwards vs. Muhammad	March 13, 2021	2	3:09	Las Vegas, Nevada, United States	
Draw	26–10–1 (1)	Enrique Barzola	Draw (majority)	UFC Fight Night: Lee vs. Oliveira	March 14, 2020	3	5:00	Brasília, Brazil	
Loss	26–10 (1)	Ricky Simón	Decision (unanimous)	UFC 234	February 10, 2019	3	5:00	Melbourne, Australia	
Win	26–9 (1)	Luke Sanders	Submission (heel hook)	UFC Fight Night: Gaethje vs. Vick	August 25, 2018	1	1:31	Lincoln, Nebraska, United States	
Win	25–9 (1)	Russell Doane	Submission (arm-triangle choke)	UFC on Fox: Emmett vs. Stephens	February 24, 2018	3	2:32	Orlando, Florida, United States	
Win	24–9 (1)	Henry Briones	Submission (kimura)	UFC Fight Night: Pettis vs. Moreno	August 5, 2017	1	2:01	Mexico City, Mexico	
Loss	23–9 (1)	Joe Soto	Decision (unanimous)	UFC Fight Night: Belfort vs. Gastelum	March 11, 2017	3	5:00	Fortaleza, Brazil	
Win	23–8 (1)	Michinori Tanaka	Decision (unanimous)	UFC Fight Night: Cyborg vs. Länsberg	September 24, 2016	3	5:00	Brasília, Brazil	
Win	22–8 (1)	Matthew Lopez	Submission (arm-triangle choke)	UFC Fight Night: McDonald vs. Lineker	July 13, 2016	3	4:19	Sioux Falls, South Dakota, United States	
Win	21–8 (1)	Masanori Kanehara	Decision (split)	UFC Fight Night: Mir vs. Duffee	July 15, 2015	3	5:00	San Diego, California, United States	
Win	20–8 (1)	Johnny Bedford	Submission (kimura)	UFC Fight Night: Bigfoot vs. Arlovski	September 13, 2014	2	2:04	Brasília, Brazil	
NC	19–8 (1)	Johnny Bedford	NC (accidental headbutt)	UFC Fight Night: Nogueira vs. Nelson	April 11, 2014	1	0:39	Abu Dhabi, United Arab Emirates	Return to Bantamweight.
Loss	19–8	Tom Niinimäki	Decision (split)	The Ultimate Fighter: Team Rousey vs. Team Tate Finale	November 30, 2013	3	5:00	Las Vegas, Nevada, United States	
Win	19–7	Josh Clopton	Decision (unanimous)	UFC 163	August 3, 2013	3	5:00	Rio de Janeiro, Brazil	
Win	18–7	Mizuto Hirota	Decision (unanimous)	UFC on Fuel TV: Silva vs. Stann	March 3, 2013	3	5:00	Saitama, Japan	
Win	17–7	Josh Grispi	Submission (north-south choke)	UFC on Fox: Shogun vs. Vera	August 4, 2012	1	3:15	Los Angeles, California, United States	
Loss	16–7	Chad Mendes	Decision (unanimous)	UFC 133	August 6, 2011	3	5:00	Philadelphia, Pennsylvania, United States	
Win	16–6	Mike Brown	Decision (unanimous)	UFC: Fight For The Troops 2	January 22, 2011	3	5:00	Fort Hood, Texas, United States	Return to Featherweight.
Loss	15–6	Takeya Mizugaki	Decision (unanimous)	WEC 48	April 24, 2010	3	5:00	Sacramento, California, United States	
Loss	15–5	Joseph Benavidez	TKO (punches)	WEC 45	December 19, 2009	1	1:35	Las Vegas, Nevada, United States	
Win	15–4	John Hosman	Submission (north-south choke)	WEC 42	August 9, 2009	1	2:08	Las Vegas, Nevada, United States	Submission of the Night.
Win	14–4	Eddie Wineland	Submission (rear-naked choke)	WEC 40	April 5, 2009	1	1:07	Chicago, Illinois, United States	Submission of the Night.
Win	13–4	Yoshiro Maeda	Submission (guillotine choke)	WEC 36	November 5, 2008	1	3:30	Hollywood, Florida, United States	Catchweight (137 lb) bout. Submission of the Night.
Loss	12–4	Norifumi Yamamoto	TKO (punches and soccer kicks)	K-1 Premium 2007 Dynamite!!	December 31, 2007	2	3:11	Osaka, Japan	
Loss	12–3	Chase Beebe	Decision (unanimous)	WEC 30	September 5, 2007	5	5:00	Las Vegas, Nevada, United States	For the WEC Bantamweight Championship.
Win	12–2	Mark Hominick	Submission (rear-naked choke)	WEC 28	June 3, 2007	1	1:19	Las Vegas, Nevada, United States	Featherweight bout. Submission of the Night.
Win	11–2	Louie Moreno	Submission (guillotine choke)	PFC 2: Fast and Furious	March 22, 2007	1	0:23	Lemoore, California, United States	
Loss	10–2	Gesias Cavalcante	Submission (guillotine choke)	Hero's 7	October 9, 2006	1	0:39	Yokohama, Japan	Hero's 2006 Lightweight Grand Prix semi-final.
Win	10–1	Kazuya Yasuhiro	Submission (D'Arce choke)	Hero's 6	August 5, 2006	1	1:08	Tokyo, Japan	Hero's 2006 Lightweight Grand Prix quarter-final.
Win	9–1	Eben Kaneshiro	Submission (Ezekiel choke)	UAGF: Kaos on Kampus	May 20, 2006	3	N/A	Los Angeles, California, United States	
Win	8–1	Ryuki Ueyama	Decision (majority)	Hero's 5	May 3, 2006	2	5:00	Tokyo, Japan	Hero's 2006 Lightweight Grand Prix opening round.
Win	7–1	Takumi Yano	Technical Submission (triangle choke)	MARS	February 4, 2006	3	2:14	Tokyo, Japan	
Win	6–1	Taiyo Nakahara	Submission (north-south choke)	GCM: D.O.G. 4	December 11, 2005	1	1:59	Tokyo, Japan	
Win	5–1	Fabio Alves	Submission (arm-triangle choke)	K-1 Brazil: Next Generation	October 30, 2004	1	N/A	Goiás, Brazil	
Loss	4–1	Fredson Paixao	Decision	Jungle Fight 2	May 15, 2004	3	5:00	Manaus, Brazil	
Win	4–0	Luciano Santos	Submission (keylock)	TNT: Vale Tudo 2	April 17, 2004	N/A	N/A	Goiânia, Brazil	
Win	3–0	Muzila Muzila	Submission (armbar)	TNT: Vale Tudo 2	April 17, 2004	N/A	N/A	Goiânia, Brazil	
Win	2–0	Fabio Alves	Submission (Peruvian necktie)	TNT: Vale Tudo 2	April 17, 2004	N/A	N/A	Goiânia, Brazil	
Win	1–0	Junior Peba	Submission (arm-triangle choke)	Kallifas Vale Tudo	September 14, 2002	1	1:30	Goiânia, Brazil	

== See also ==
- List of male mixed martial artists
