= Manny Tapia =

American mixed martial arts fighter

- Born: Manuel Alcaraz Tapia; March 14, 1981 (age 45); Riverside, California, United States
- Other names: The Mangler
- Nationality: American
- Height: 5 ft 5 in (1.65 m)
- Weight: 135 lb (61 kg; 9.6 st)
- Division: Bantamweight; Featherweight; Flyweight
- Reach: 67.0 in (170 cm)
- Stance: Southpaw
- Fighting out of: Chino, California
- Team: Millennia MMA Gym
- Rank: Black belt in Brazilian jiu-jitsu
- Years active: 2003–2012

Mixed martial arts record
- Total: 17
- Wins: 12
- By knockout: 4
- By submission: 2
- By decision: 6
- Losses: 4
- By knockout: 2
- By decision: 2
- Draws: 1

Other information
- Mixed martial arts record from Sherdog

Manuel Alcaraz Tapia (born March 14, 1981) is an American professional mixed martial arts fighter currently competing in the Bantamweight division. He has formerly competed for the WEC, King of the Cage, and Tachi Palace Fights. He is the former King of the Cage Flyweight Champion.

== Background ==
Tapia is from Riverside, California. After the death of his parents, Tapia used football, judo, and wrestling as outlets for his anger. He attended Don Lugo High School in Chino, California and Chaffey College. Tapia was originally introduced to mixed martial arts a year out of high school.

== Mixed martial arts career ==
=== Early career ===
Tapia made his professional mixed martial arts debut in 2003 for King of the Cage and compiled a record of 4-0-1 before winning the King of the Cage Flyweight Championship. He later signed with the WEC and was stripped of his title.

=== World Extreme Cagefighting ===
Tapia made his WEC debut at WEC 27 on May 12, 2007, in a Featherweight bout against Brandon Foxworth and won via TKO in the second round.

Tapia then fought at WEC 32 on February 13, 2008, against Antonio Banuelos and won via split decision. This brought Tapia's career record to 10-0-1.

At WEC 37, Tapia suffered a second-round TKO loss in a title fight with the WEC Bantamweight Champion Miguel Torres and lost via unanimous decision to Akitoshi Tamura at WEC 40. Tapia then fought Eddie Wineland on October 10, 2009, on the undercard at WEC 43, losing via unanimous decision.

Tapia was then released from the WEC after this loss and it was announced on November 17, 2009, that he has signed with Tachi Palace Fights. He debuted on their February 4 event in Lemoore, California, facing current UFC fighter Michael McDonald and lost via TKO in the first round.

== Personal life ==
Aside from fighting, Tapia currently co-owner of Millennia MMA alongside his Partner Romie Aram.

== Championships and accomplishments ==
- King of the Cage
  - KOTC Flyweight Championship (One time)

== Mixed martial arts record ==
Professional record breakdown
17 matches	12 wins	4 losses
By knockout	4	2
By submission	2	0
By decision	6	2
Draws	1	

Res.	Record	Opponent	Method	Event	Date	Round	Time	Location	Notes
Win	12–4–1	Pete Sabala	Decision (unanimous)	SCMMA 1 - Inland Empire Strikes	October 20, 2012	3	5:00	Ontario, California, United States	
Win	11–4–1	Bobby Sanchez	Decision (unanimous)	Respect in the Cage 10	March 12, 2011	3	5:00	Pomona, California, United States	
Loss	10–4–1	Michael McDonald	TKO (punches)	TPF 3: Champions Collide	February 4, 2010	1	4:31	Lemoore, California, United States	
Loss	10–3–1	Eddie Wineland	Decision (unanimous)	WEC 43	October 10, 2009	3	5:00	San Antonio, Texas, United States	
Loss	10–2–1	Akitoshi Tamura	Decision (unanimous)	WEC 40	April 5, 2009	3	5:00	Chicago, Illinois, United States	
Loss	10–1–1	Miguel Torres	TKO (punches and elbows)	WEC 37: Torres vs. Tapia	December 8, 2008	2	3:02	Las Vegas, Nevada, United States	For the WEC Bantamweight Championship.
Win	10–0–1	Antonio Banuelos	Decision (split)	WEC 32: Condit vs. Prater	February 13, 2008	3	5:00	Rio Rancho, New Mexico, United States	
Win	9–0–1	Brandon Foxworth	TKO (punches)	WEC 27	May 12, 2007	2	3:17	Las Vegas, Nevada, United States	Featherweight bout.
Win	8–0–1	Richard Montano	TKO (knee & punches)	KOTC: Destroyer	December 1, 2006	3	3:24	San Jacinto, California, United States	
Win	7–0–1	Shad Smith	Decision (unanimous)	KOTC: Rapid Fire	August 4, 2006	3	5:00	San Jacinto, California, United States	
Win	6–0–1	Ed Newalu	Decision (unanimous)	KOTC 63: Final Conflict	December 2, 2005	3	5:00	San Jacinto, California, United States	
Win	5–0–1	Gregory Vivian	Submission (arm-triangle choke)	KOTC 58: Prime Time	August 5, 2005	1	4:25	San Jacinto, California, United States	Won the vacant KOTC Flyweight Championship.
Win	4–0–1	Richard Goodman	TKO (punches)	KOTC: Mortal Sins	May 7, 2005	2	2:07	Primm, Nevada, United States	
Win	3–0–1	Ed Newalu	Decision (unanimous)	KOTC 41: Relentless	September 29, 2004	3	5:00	San Jacinto, California, United States	
Win	2–0–1	Michael Welty	KO (punch)	KOTC 37: Unfinished Business	June 12, 2004	1	0:07	San Jacinto, California, United States	
Draw	1–0–1	Chad Washburn	Draw (split)	KOTC 33: After Shock	February 20, 2004	3	5:00	San Jacinto, California, United States	
Win	1–0	Manuel Sawyze	Submission (rear-naked choke)	KOTC 31: King of the Cage 31	December 6, 2003	1	2:07	San Jacinto, California, United States	
