= Michael McDonald (fighter) =

American mixed martial arts fighter

- Born: Michael Robert McDonald; January 15, 1991 (age 35); Modesto, California, United States
- Other names: Mayday
- Height: 5 ft 8 in (1.73 m)
- Weight: 135 lb (61 kg; 9 st 9 lb)
- Division: Bantamweight
- Reach: 70 in (178 cm)
- Style: Kickboxing, Brazilian Jiu-Jitsu
- Fighting out of: Modesto, California, United States
- Team: Oakdale MMA
- Rank: Black belt in Brazilian Jiu-Jitsu
- Years active: 2007 – 2018

Mixed martial arts record
- Total: 23
- Wins: 19
- By knockout: 10
- By submission: 6
- By decision: 3
- Losses: 4
- By knockout: 2
- By submission: 2

Other information
- Mixed martial arts record from Sherdog

Michael Robert McDonald (born January 15, 1991) is a retired American mixed martial artist. McDonald competed in the Bantamweight division of the UFC, where he challenged for the interim UFC Bantamweight Championship at 22 years of age. He also competed in the Bantamweight division of Bellator MMA before retiring following another hand injury.

A professional fighter from 2007 to 2017, McDonald fought mostly in regional promotions in his home state of California before signing with Zuffa in 2010.

== Career ==
=== Background ===
McDonald started training in kickboxing at the age of ten, turned to mixed martial arts at 13, started his amateur career at 14, and turned professional at 16 in 2007. He also has two brothers who had professional careers in mixed martial arts. He trains at Oakdale Mixed Martial Arts with the Last Stand Fight Team. McDonald graduated in 2009 from Grace M. Davis High School where he was voted Best Athlete and Most Likely to Succeed.

=== Early career ===
He gained notable wins on the regional circuit defeating WEC veteran Manny Tapia and former WEC Featherweight Champion, Cole Escovedo. Against the latter, McDonald later avenged his only professional defeat, which also earned him the Tachi Palace Fights Bantamweight title with a second-round KO. In the summer of 2010, he was listed as one of the top rising stars under the age of 25.

=== World Extreme Cagefighting ===
In September 2010, at age 19, McDonald became the youngest fighter on the Zuffa roster when he signed with the WEC. He defeated Clint Godfrey via first round submission in his promotional debut on November 11, 2010, at WEC 52.

=== Ultimate Fighting Championship ===
On October 28, 2010, World Extreme Cagefighting merged with the Ultimate Fighting Championship. As part of the merger, all WEC fighters were transferred to the UFC.

McDonald was expected to face Nick Pace on March 26, 2011, at UFC Fight Night 24. However, Pace was forced out of the bout with an injury and replaced by promotional newcomer Edwin Figueroa. McDonald won the fight via unanimous decision. The fight was highly entertaining with both fighters exchanging strikes and submission attempts throughout the entire fight and earned Fight of the Night honors.

McDonald faced Chris Cariaso on May 30, 2011, at UFC 130, replacing an injured Norifumi Yamamoto. He won the fight via split decision.

McDonald was expected to face Johnny Eduardo on November 19, 2011, at UFC 139. However, Eduardo was forced from the card with an injury and replaced by promotional newcomer Alex Soto. McDonald defeated Soto via first-round KO, earning Knockout of the Night honors. McDonald clipped Soto with a counter right hand and then swarmed Soto with a flurry of punches against the fence, forcing the referee to stop the bout just 59 seconds into the first round.

McDonald fought former WEC Bantamweight Champion Miguel Angel Torres on April 21, 2012, at UFC 145. He won the fight via first round Knockout.

On December 4, 2012, UFC President Dana White announced that the UFC Bantamweight Champion Dominick Cruz had reinjured his ACL requiring surgery and would be out for 6–9 months. McDonald faced the UFC Interim Bantamweight Champion Renan Barão on February 16, 2013, at UFC on Fuel TV: Barão vs. McDonald. McDonald was competitive with capable take-down defense and crisp boxing - particularly in the first two rounds - but ultimately succumbed to Barão's more diverse skillset as he mixed in knees and kicks standing together with take-downs. Barão secured an arm-triangle choke at 3:57 of the fourth round, forcing the tap from McDonald. McDonald holds the record for being the youngest fighter to challenge a UFC Championship.

McDonald faced Brad Pickett on August 17, 2013, at UFC Fight Night 26. He dominated the first round, almost finishing Pickett with strikes before gaining a second round submission victory with a triangle choke. The win also earned McDonald his first Submission of the Night award, and he and Pickett earned the Fight of the Night bonus award as well.

McDonald faced Urijah Faber on December 14, 2013, at UFC on Fox 9. After a back and forth first round, Faber stunned McDonald in the second with a flurry of punches, McDonald went to the canvas and Faber jumped on him and finished the fight by submission due to a guillotine choke.

After being sidelined for all of 2014 and 2015 nursing a litany of injuries, including multiple hand and wrist surgeries, McDonald returned to face Masanori Kanehara on January 2, 2016, at UFC 195. He won the fight via submission in the second round, after nearly being submitted himself by an arm-triangle choke in the preceding sequence of the fight. The win also earned McDonald a Performance of the Night bonus award.

McDonald next faced John Lineker on July 13, 2016, at UFC Fight Night 91. He lost the fight via knockout in the first round

=== Bellator MMA ===
On March 16, 2017, McDonald announced that he was parting ways with the UFC due to their dealing with him "very dishonestly and disrespectfully." On March 24, 2017, McDonald announced he signed a deal with Bellator MMA.

McDonald made his promotional debut on December 15, 2017, at Bellator 191 against Peter Ligier. He won the fight by unanimous decision. McDonald broke his hand in the third round, resulting in his fourth hand surgery.

McDonald next faced former Bellator Bantamweight Champion Eduardo Dantas on July 13, 2018, at Bellator 202. He won the fight via knockout in the first round. McDonald suffered another badly broken hand in the bout, leaving McDonald questioning whether his career could continue. The metacarpal bone in his left hand was shattered and crushed resulting in McDonald's fifth hand surgery. McDonald described the recovery from this surgery as "the worst pain of his life".

McDonald announced his retirement from professional MMA competition on September 27, 2018.

McDonald is now the owner and operator of Mayday's Custom Woodworks. McDonald started learning woodworking at the age of fourteen and launched his business in 2012 as supplemental income to his fighting career.

== Championships and accomplishments ==
- Tachi Palace Fights
  - TPF Bantamweight Championship (One time)
- Ultimate Fighting Championship
  - Fight of the Night (Two times) vs. Edwin Figueroa, Brad Pickett
  - Knockout of the Night (One time) vs. Alex Soto
  - Submission of the Night (One time) vs. Brad Pickett
  - Performance of the Night (One time) vs. Masanori Kanehara
  - Youngest fighter to compete for a UFC championship (22 years, 32 days)
  - UFC.com Awards
    - 2011: Ranked #8 Import of the Year
    - 2016: Ranked #8 Submission of the Year vs. Masanori Kanehara

== Mixed martial arts record ==
Professional record breakdown
23 matches	19 wins	4 losses
By knockout	10	2
By submission	6	2
By decision	3	0

Res.	Record	Opponent	Method	Event	Date	Round	Time	Location	Notes
Win	19–4	Eduardo Dantas	KO (punches)	Bellator 202	July 13, 2018	1	0:58	Thackerville, Oklahoma, United States	Retired after bout.
Win	18–4	Peter Ligier	Decision (unanimous)	Bellator 191	December 15, 2017	3	5:00	Newcastle, England	
Loss	17–4	John Lineker	KO (punches)	UFC Fight Night: McDonald vs. Lineker	July 13, 2016	1	2:43	Sioux Falls, South Dakota, United States	
Win	17–3	Masanori Kanehara	Submission (rear-naked choke)	UFC 195	January 2, 2016	2	2:09	Las Vegas, Nevada, United States	Performance of the Night.
Loss	16–3	Urijah Faber	Submission (guillotine choke)	UFC on Fox: Johnson vs. Benavidez 2	December 14, 2013	2	3:22	Sacramento, California, United States	
Win	16–2	Brad Pickett	Submission (triangle choke)	UFC Fight Night: Shogun vs. Sonnen	August 17, 2013	2	3:43	Boston, Massachusetts, United States	Submission of the Night. Fight of the Night.
Loss	15–2	Renan Barão	Submission (arm-triangle choke)	UFC on Fuel TV: Barão vs. McDonald	February 16, 2013	4	3:57	London, England	For the interim UFC Bantamweight Championship.
Win	15–1	Miguel Torres	KO (punches)	UFC 145	April 21, 2012	1	3:18	Atlanta, Georgia, United States	
Win	14–1	Alex Soto	KO (punches)	UFC 139	November 19, 2011	1	0:56	San Jose, California, United States	Knockout of the Night.
Win	13–1	Chris Cariaso	Decision (split)	UFC 130	May 28, 2011	3	5:00	Las Vegas, Nevada, United States	
Win	12–1	Edwin Figueroa	Decision (unanimous)	UFC Fight Night: Nogueira vs. Davis	March 26, 2011	3	5:00	Seattle, Washington, United States	Fight of the Night.
Win	11–1	Clint Godfrey	Submission (armbar)	WEC 52	November 11, 2010	1	2:42	Las Vegas, Nevada, United States	
Win	10–1	Cole Escovedo	KO (punches)	TPF 5: Stars and Strikes	July 9, 2010	2	1:12	Lemoore, California, United States	Won the TPF Bantamweight Championship.
Win	9–1	Manny Tapia	TKO (punches)	TPF 3: Champions Collide	February 4, 2010	1	4:31	Lemoore, California, United States	
Win	8–1	Carlos Garces	TKO (punches)	TPF 1: Tachi Palace Fights 1	October 8, 2009	1	2:01	Lemoore, California, United States	
Loss	7–1	Cole Escovedo	TKO (punches)	PFC 13: Validation	May 8, 2009	2	2:25	Lemoore, California, United States	
Win	7–0	Jason Georgianna	TKO (punches)	PFC 12: High Stakes	January 22, 2009	1	2:38	Lemoore, California, United States	
Win	6–0	Randy Rodoni	KO (punch)	Gladiator Challenge 86: Day of the Dead	November 2, 2008	1	0:47	Porterville, California, United States	
Win	5–0	Fernando Arreola	Submission (D'Arce choke)	Gladiator Challenge 84: Bad Blood	September 7, 2008	1	3:49	Porterville, California, United States	
Win	4–0	Javier Vargas	TKO (punches)	Gladiator Challenge 81: Lights Out	July 27, 2008	1	1:38	Porterville, California, United States	
Win	3–0	Steve Frano	TKO (punches)	Gladiator Challenge 78: No Limits	May 18, 2008	1	1:17	Porterville, California, United States	
Win	2–0	Dominic Pena	Submission (arm-triangle choke)	Gladiator Challenge 76: Alpha Dog Challenge	March 17, 2008	1	1:12	Porterville, California, United States	
Win	1–0	Joe Corona	Submission (triangle choke)	Gladiator Challenge 71: Lock-N-Load	November 11, 2007	1	1:17	Porterville, California, United States	

== See also ==
- List of current Bellator fighters
- List of male mixed martial artists
