= WEC 32 =

World Extreme Cagefighting mixed martial arts event in 2008

WEC 32: New Mexico
- The poster for WEC 32: New Mexico
- Promotion: World Extreme Cagefighting
- Date: February 13, 2008
- Venue: Santa Ana Star Center
- City: Rio Rancho, New Mexico
- Attendance: 4,648

Event chronology
WEC 31: Faber vs. Curran	WEC 32: New Mexico	WEC 33: Marshall vs. Stann

WEC 32: New Mexico was a mixed martial arts (MMA) event held by World Extreme Cagefighting (WEC) that took place on Wednesday, February 13, 2008. For the first time under Zuffa ownership, the show was held in Rio Rancho, New Mexico and not the usual spot of Las Vegas, Nevada. The event drew an estimated 268,000 viewers on Versus, a record low for the WEC.

Jesse Moreng was originally slated to face the debuting Scott Jorgensen at this event, but withdrew from the bout due to a leg injury and was replaced by WEC newcomer Damacio Page.

== Results ==
Main card
Weight class				Method	Round	Time	Notes
Welterweight	Carlos Condit (c)	def	Carlo Prater	Submission (guillotine choke)	1	3:48	(Note: For the WEC Welterweight Championship.)
Lightweight	Jamie Varner	def	Rob McCullough (c)	TKO (strikes)	3	2:54	(Note: For the WEC Lightweight Championship.)
Bantamweight	Miguel Torres	def	Chase Beebe (c)	Submission (guillotine choke)	1	3:59	(Note: For the WEC Bantamweight Championship.)
Bantamweight	Manny Tapia	def	Antonio Banuelos	Decision (split) (28–29, 30–27, 29–28)	3	5:00	(Note: The fight was originally announced as a split draw, Banuelos 29–28, and the two others being 30–27 for Tapia and a 28–28 draw, though a scorecard error was realized, and corrected to the ultimate outcome of a split decision for Manny Tapia.)
Preliminary card
Featherweight	Micah Miller	def	Chance Farrar	TKO (punches)	1	1:39
Bantamweight	Yoshiro Maeda	def	Charlie Valencia	TKO (body kick)	1	2:29	(Note: Although preliminary, this bout aired on the live broadcast.)
Bantamweight	Damacio Page	def	Scott Jorgensen	Decision (unanimous) (30–27, 29–28, 29–28)	3	5:00
Bantamweight	Coty Wheeler	def	Del Hawkins	Submission (flying armbar)	2	1:57
Featherweight	Josh Grispi	def	Mark Hominick	Submission (rear naked choke)	1	2:55
Featherweight	Leonard Garcia	def	Hiroyuki Takaya	TKO (punches)	1	1:31	(Note: Although preliminary, this bout aired on the live broadcast.)

== See also ==
- World Extreme Cagefighting
- List of World Extreme Cagefighting champions
- List of WEC events
- 2008 in WEC
