= WEC 43 =

World Extreme Cagefighting mixed martial arts event in 2009

WEC 43: Cerrone vs. Henderson
- The poster for WEC 43: Cerrone vs. Henderson
- Promotion: World Extreme Cagefighting
- Date: October 10, 2009
- Venue: AT&T Center
- City: San Antonio, Texas
- Attendance: 5,176
- Total gate: $297,990

Event chronology
WEC 42: Torres vs. Bowles	WEC 43: Cerrone vs. Henderson	WEC 44: Brown vs. Aldo

WEC 43: Cerrone vs. Henderson was a mixed martial arts event held by World Extreme Cagefighting on October 10, 2009, at the AT&T Center in San Antonio, Texas.

== Background ==
The event was scheduled to take place on September 2, 2009, at the Covelli Centre in Youngstown, Ohio. However, due to headliner Benson Henderson having eye surgery, the event was later rescheduled.

The main event was expected to be a WEC Lightweight Championship bout between current champion Jamie Varner and challenger Donald Cerrone. This was to be a rematch of their bout at WEC 38 which ended in a controversial technical split decision, but Varner was deemed medically unable to return to competition. Instead, the WEC had Cerrone face Benson Henderson, for the WEC Interim Lightweight Championship, with the winner fighting Varner in a title unification bout when he was medically cleared. The Varner/Cerrone rematch would later take place at WEC 51 the following year (though after Varner lost the title), where Cerrone won by unanimous decision.

A previously announced bout between Alex Karalexis and Anthony Pettis has been cancelled due to an injury suffered by Karalexis while training. The fight was rescheduled for WEC 48.

Mark Hominick was expected to face Deividas Taurosevičius at the event, but was forced from the bout with an injury and replaced by Javier Vazquez.

Erik Koch was expected to face Wagnney Fabiano at the event, but was forced from the bout with an injury and replaced by promotional newcomer Mackens Semerzier.

Rafael Rebello was originally scheduled to face Scott Jorgensen at this event, but was removed from the bout and replaced by Noah Thomas.

Akitoshi Tamura was expected to compete against Damacio Page at this event, but was pulled from the card due to injury and replaced by WEC newcomer Will Campuzano.

The event drew an estimated 419,000 viewers on Versus.

== Results ==
Main card
Weight class				Method	Round	Time	Notes
Lightweight	Benson Henderson	def	Donald Cerrone	Decision (unanimous) (48–47, 48–47, 48–47)	5	5:00	(Note: For the interim WEC Lightweight Championship.)
Lightweight	Dave Jansen	def	Richard Crunkilton	Decision (unanimous) (30–27, 29–28, 29–28)	3	5:00
Featherweight	Raphael Assunção	def	Yves Jabouin	Decision (split) (30–27, 27–30, 29–28)	3	5:00
Bantamweight	Damacio Page	def	Will Campuzano	Submission (rear naked choke)	1	1:02
Preliminary card
Lightweight	Anthony Njokuani	def	Muhsin Corbbrey	TKO (punches)	2	1:42
Bantamweight	Scott Jorgensen	def	Noah Thomas	TKO (punches)	1	3:13	(Note: This bout was aired on the live broadcast.)
Featherweight	Mackens Semerzier	def	Wagnney Fabiano	Submission (triangle choke)	1	2:14	(Note: This bout was aired on the live broadcast.)
Bantamweight	Eddie Wineland	def	Manny Tapia	Decision (unanimous) (30–27, 30–27, 30–27)	3	5:00
Bantamweight	Charlie Valencia	def	Coty Wheeler	Decision (unanimous) (30–27, 29–28, 29–28)	3	5:00
Featherweight	Deividas Taurosevičius	def	Javier Vazquez	Decision (split) (29–28, 28–29, 29–28)	3	5:00

== Bonus awards ==
Fighters were awarded $10,000 bonuses, with the Fight of the Night earners having their bonuses doubled to $20,000 each.

- Fight of the Night: (United States) Donald Cerrone vs. (United States) Benson Henderson
- Knockout of the Night: (Nigeria) Anthony Njokuani
- Submission of the Night: (United States) Mackens Semerzier

== See also ==
- World Extreme Cagefighting
- List of World Extreme Cagefighting champions
- List of WEC events
- 2009 in WEC
