= WEC 46 =

WEC MMA event in 2010

WEC 46: Varner vs. Henderson
- The poster for WEC 46: Varner vs. Henderson
- Promotion: World Extreme Cagefighting
- Date: January 10, 2010
- Venue: ARCO Arena
- City: Sacramento, California
- Attendance: 10,027
- Total gate: $550,000

Event chronology
WEC 45: Cerrone vs. Ratcliff	WEC 46: Varner vs. Henderson	WEC 47: Bowles vs. Cruz

WEC 46: Varner vs. Henderson was a mixed martial arts event held by World Extreme Cagefighting on January 10, 2010. It took place at the ARCO Arena in Sacramento, California.

== Background ==
Mark Hominick was scheduled to face Yves Jabouin on this card, but Jabouin has been forced off the card with an injury. Jabouin was replaced by WEC newcomer Bryan Caraway. Hominick and Jabouin would later face off at WEC 49 on June 20, 2010, with Hominick winning via TKO.

Wagnney Fabiano was scheduled to fight Frank Gomez at this event, however Gomez withdrew with an undisclosed injury and was replaced by Clint Godfrey. The Fabiano/Gomez bout was also rescheduled for WEC 49, where Fabiano won by unanimous decision.

Bantamweight contests pitting Eddie Wineland against Rafael Rebello and WEC newcomer George Roop against the returning Jesse Moreng were both scratched from this card after Rebello and Moreng both withdrew from the event. Rather than find new opponents, Wineland and Roop were instead matched up against each other on this card.

A lightweight bout between Dave Jansen and Bendy Casimir was once linked to this event, though it was later confirmed that Jansen would instead be facing Kamal Shalorus.

This was the last WEC card to feature former UFC Heavyweight Champion Frank Mir on color commentary. He was officially replaced in April 2010 by Stephan Bonnar, who had filled in for Mir at WEC 47 due to training commitments.

The event drew an estimated 640,000 viewers on Versus.

== Results ==
Main card
Weight class				Method	Round	Time	Notes
Lightweight	Benson Henderson (ic)	def	Jamie Varner (c)	Submission (guillotine choke)	3	2:41	(Note: For the WEC Lightweight Championship.)
Featherweight	Urijah Faber	def	Raphael Assunção	Submission (rear naked choke)	3	3:49
Lightweight	Kamal Shalorus	def	Dave Jansen	Decision (unanimous) (30–27, 30–27, 29–28)	3	5:00
Featherweight	Mike Brown	def	Anthony Morrison	Submission (rear naked choke)	1	1:54
Featherweight	Deividas Taurosevičius	def	Mackens Semerzier	Decision (unanimous) (29–28, 29–28, 29–28)	3	5:00
Preliminary card
Bantamweight	Charlie Valencia	def	Akitoshi Tamura	Decision (split) (29–28, 28–29, 29–28)	3	5:00
Bantamweight	Wagnney Fabiano	def	Clint Godfrey	Decision (unanimous) (30–27, 30–27, 30–27)	3	5:00
Featherweight	Mark Hominick	def	Bryan Caraway	Submission (triangle armbar)	1	3:48	(Note: This bout was aired on the live broadcast.)
Bantamweight	Eddie Wineland	def	George Roop	Decision (unanimous) (30–27, 30–27, 30–27)	3	5:00
Bantamweight	Will Campuzano	def	Coty Wheeler	Decision (unanimous) (30–26, 30–27, 30–27)	3	5:00

== Bonus Awards ==
Fighters were awarded $10,000 bonuses.

- Fight of the Night: (United States) Coty Wheeler vs. (Mexico) Will Campuzano
- Knockout of the Night: Not awarded as no matches ended with knockout
- Submission of the Night: (United States) Urijah Faber

== Reported payout ==
The following is the reported payout to the fighters as reported to the California State Athletic Commission. It does not include sponsor money or "locker room" bonuses often given by the WEC and also do not include the WEC's traditional "fight night" bonuses.

- Benson Henderson: $22,000 (includes $11,000 win bonus) def. Jamie Varner: $18,000
- Urijah Faber: $52,000 ($26,000 win bonus) def. Raphael Assunção: $13,000
- Kamal Shalorus: $10,000 ($5,000 win bonus) def. Dave Jansen: $4,000
- Mike Brown: $38,000 ($19,000 win bonus) def. Anthony Morrison: $4,000
- Deividas Taurosevičius: $14,000 ($7,000 win bonus) def. Mackens Semerzier: $4,000
- Charlie Valencia: $18,000 ($9,000 win bonus) def. Akitoshi Tamura: $8,000
- Wagnney Fabiano: $30,000 ($15,000 win bonus) def. Clint Godfrey: $3,000
- Mark Hominick: $10,000 ($5,000 win bonus) def. Bryan Caraway: $4,000
- Eddie Wineland: $8,000 ($4,000 win bonus) def. George Roop: $3,000
- Will Campuzano: $6,000 ($3,000 win bonus) def. Coty Wheeler: $3,000

== See also ==
- World Extreme Cagefighting
- List of World Extreme Cagefighting champions
- List of WEC events
- 2010 in WEC
