= Benson Henderson =

American mixed martial artist (born 1983)

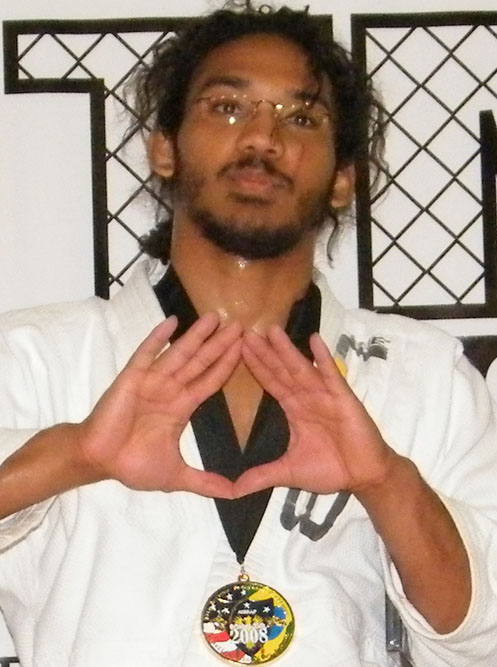
- Henderson in 2008
- Born: November 16, 1983 (age 43); Colorado Springs, Colorado, U.S.
- Nickname: Smooth
- Height: 5 ft 9 in (1.75 m)
- Weight: 155 lb (70 kg; 11 st 1 lb)
- Division: Lightweight (2006–2015, 2016–2023); Welterweight (2015–2016, 2020)
- Reach: 71 in (180 cm)
- Stance: Southpaw
- Fighting out of: Glendale, Arizona, U.S.
- Team: The MMA Lab
- Rank: Black belt in Taekwondo; Black belt in Brazilian Jiu-Jitsu under John Crouch
- Wrestling: NAIA Wrestling
- Years active: 2006–2023

Mixed martial arts record
- Total: 43
- Wins: 30
- By knockout: 5
- By submission: 9
- By decision: 16
- Losses: 13
- By knockout: 3
- By submission: 3
- By decision: 7

Other information
- University: Dana College
- Notable school: Decatur High School
- Website: smoothbensonhenderson.com
- Mixed martial arts record from Sherdog
Medal record
Representing United States
Men's Grappling
World No-Gi Jiu-Jitsu Championship
Bronze medal – third place	2014 Long Beach	79.5 kg (Black)
World Jiu-Jitsu Championship
Bronze medal – third place	2011 Long Beach	76 kg (Brown)

Benson Henderson (born November 16, 1983) is an American former professional mixed martial artist, who most recently competed in the Lightweight division for Bellator MMA. He is a former UFC Lightweight Champion and WEC Lightweight Champion. He is considered one of the greatest lightweight MMA fighters of all time and is tied with B.J. Penn, Frankie Edgar, and Khabib Nurmagomedov for the second-most UFC lightweight title defenses.

== Early life ==
Benson Henderson was born in Colorado Springs, Colorado to a Korean mother and an African American father. He has an older brother, Julius, who was born in South Korea. He was raised in Federal Way, Washington. When Henderson was approximately nine years old, his mother, Song-Hwa (née Kim), insisted that he take Tae Kwon Do lessons with his brother. "She's Korean, I'm half-Korean, and it's the traditional Korean martial art, so she wanted us to do that to get a little bit of the culture and tradition," he says. Both Benson and his brother attained black belts in Tae Kwon Do.

He attended Decatur High School from 1998 to 2001. While in high school, Benson became a part of the wrestling team. In 2000 Benson's junior year of high school, Benson qualified for the state wrestling tournament at 125lbs but did not place. In 2001 Benson's senior year of high school, Benson qualified for the state wrestling tournament at 135lbs placing 2nd. After graduating from high school, he attended Dana College in Blair, Nebraska and graduated in 2006 with a double degree in criminal justice and sociology. While attending Dana College, Henderson was on the wrestling team, and was twice named an NAIA All-American. Benson placed 5th at nationals in 2005 at 157lbs, after losing by 1 point in his semifinals match. Benson placed 5th again in 2006 at 157lbs.

== Mixed martial arts career ==
Henderson turned professional in 2006, winning his first match against Dan Gregary. He lost his third fight to Rocky Johnson via technical submission. However, this defeat was a minor setback. He rebounded with four straight wins before facing his toughest fight yet, against a UFC veteran, Diego Saraiva. Henderson came prepared as he dominated Saraiva for three rounds, winning a unanimous decision and his 7th professional win.

=== World Extreme Cagefighting ===
==== WEC Lightweight Championship ====
Three months later, Henderson made his World Extreme Cagefighting debut on January 25, 2009, at WEC 38 against Anthony Njokuani. Henderson defeated Njokuani with a guillotine choke early in round two.

Henderson faced Shane Roller on April 5, 2009, at WEC 40. Henderson won the bout via first-round TKO.

==== Interim WEC Lightweight Championship ====
Henderson was given an opportunity to fight for the Interim WEC Lightweight Championship against Donald Cerrone when lightweight champion Jamie Varner was unable to defend his title due to an injury. The fight took place on October 10, 2009, at WEC 43. Henderson won an exciting back-and-forth fight by unanimous decision. Both Henderson and Cerrone were awarded with an additional purse of $20,000 for Fight of the Night. The bout was also awarded 2009 Fight of the Year for all of MMA by Sherdog.com

==== Undisputed WEC Lightweight Championship ====
Henderson faced Jamie Varner to unify the WEC Lightweight Championship at WEC 46 on January 10, 2010. After being outboxed and outwrestled in the first two rounds, Henderson came back and caught Varner in a standing guillotine choke ending the fight at 2:41 of the third round.

Henderson had his first title defense in a rematch with Donald Cerrone on April 24, 2010, at WEC 48. defeating Cerrone via guillotine choke in the first round. The win earned him a Submission of the Night bonus award.

Henderson faced Anthony Pettis on December 16, 2010, at WEC 53. Henderson lost his title by unanimous decision. The fight won Fight of the Night honors.

=== Ultimate Fighting Championship ===
In October 2010, World Extreme Cagefighting merged with the Ultimate Fighting Championship. As part of the merger, all WEC fighters were transferred to the UFC.

Henderson made his UFC debut at UFC 129 on April 30, 2011, where he faced Mark Bocek. Henderson won the fight via unanimous decision.

Henderson next faced Jim Miller on August 14, 2011, at UFC on Versus 5. Henderson dominated the streaking Miller throughout the fight, utilizing a stiff jab, great transitions, and vicious ground and pound throughout the match to snap Miller's 7 fight win streak, the third longest in the UFC at the time. Despite being threatened with multiple deep submission attempts, Henderson escaped each attempt and advanced position with increasingly brutal punches and elbows. He earned a unanimous decision (30-27, 29–28, 30–26).

Henderson faced Clay Guida on November 12, 2011, at UFC on Fox 1. He won the fight via unanimous decision after three rounds in an action packed war that earned both fighters Fight of the Night honors. With the win, he became the #1 contender for the UFC Lightweight title.

==== UFC Lightweight Championship ====
Henderson faced Frankie Edgar on February 26, 2012, at UFC 144. Henderson defeated Edgar via unanimous decision to become the new UFC Lightweight Champion. Both participants earned Fight of the Night honors for their performance.

A rematch with Edgar took place on August 11, 2012, at UFC 150. In a bout that was very tightly contested, Henderson defeated Edgar again, this time via split decision.

Henderson faced Nate Diaz on December 8, 2012, at UFC on Fox 5. Henderson punished Diaz with kicks, superior wrestling and ground and pound, Henderson knocked Diaz down twice with punches and was able to take his back on numerous occasions earning a unanimous decision victory.

Henderson faced the final Strikeforce Lightweight Champion, and promotional newcomer Gilbert Melendez on April 20, 2013, at UFC on Fox 7. Henderson won the fight by a closely contested split decision. After 3 consecutive wins to retain the title, Henderson tied B.J. Penn with the highest number of title defenses as a lightweight.

==== Title loss and post title return ====
Henderson was expected to face T. J. Grant on August 31, 2013, at UFC 164. However, Grant was forced out of the bout with an injury, setting up a rematch with Anthony Pettis who defeated Henderson last time they fought via unanimous decision at the final WEC event, WEC 53. Pettis defeated Henderson via submission (armbar) in the first round. This is the second time Henderson lost his championship belt and title to Pettis.

In his first post-title loss fight, Henderson faced Josh Thomson on January 25, 2014, in the main event at UFC on Fox 10. Henderson defeated Thomson via split decision. He nearly became the first man to submit Thomson when he caught Thomson in a standing arm-triangle choke. Many media outlets and observers were split on who they thought should have been declared the winner. Thomson had one more takedown (5 to 4) and was able to secure Henderson's back on multiple occasions, while Henderson was able to significantly outstrike Thomson (114 to 33) over the duration of the bout and was credited with the bout's only submission attempt.

Henderson faced Rustam Khabilov on June 7, 2014, in the main event at UFC Fight Night: Henderson vs. Khabilov. He won the fight via rear-naked choke submission in the fourth round. The win also earned Henderson his first Performance of the Night bonus award.

Henderson headlined UFC Fight Night 49 against Rafael dos Anjos on August 23, 2014. He lost the fight via knockout in the first round.

Henderson was scheduled to fight Eddie Alvarez on January 18, 2015, at UFC Fight Night 59. However, Alvarez pulled out of the fight in early January due to illness, and was replaced by Donald Cerrone in a rematch. Henderson lost the fight via a controversial unanimous decision. 12 of 14 media outlets scored the bout in favor of Henderson.

==== Switching weight classes ====
Henderson decided to make the move up to welterweight after a spot became available at UFC Fight Night 60 with Brandon Thatch on February 14, 2015, in the event headliner at UFC Fight Night 60, where he replaced an injured Stephen Thompson. Henderson won the back and forth fight via submission in the fourth round.

A bout with Michael Johnson was initially leaked as the event headliner for The Ultimate Fighter 21 Finale on July 12, 2015. Although never officially announced by the UFC, the bout between Henderson and Johnson will not take place at this event. Subsequently, Henderson revealed his intentions to return, at least temporarily, to the welterweight division and targeted a return date of November 2015 and a possible appearance on the UFC's inaugural event in Seoul.

Henderson was expected to face Thiago Alves on November 28, 2015, at UFC Fight Night 79. However, on November 14, 2015, Alves pulled out the bout citing injury and was replaced by Jorge Masvidal. Henderson won the back-and-forth fight via split decision.

=== Bellator MMA ===
On February 1, 2016, Henderson announced that he had signed with Bellator MMA. In his debut, he faced Andrey Koreshkov on April 22, 2016, at Bellator 153 for the Bellator Welterweight Championship. Henderson lost the fight by unanimous decision.

==== Title contention and title shot ====
For his second fight with the promotion, Henderson made his return to the lightweight division to fight Patrício Pitbull in the main event at Bellator 160 on August 26, 2016. The bout ended in anticlimactic fashion as Pitbull stopped himself early in round two to declare he had sustained a leg injury. As a result, Henderson was awarded a TKO victory due to injury and earned a title shot against Michael Chandler. It was revealed post-fight that Freire had broken his shin in the first round after Henderson checked a low kick with his knee.

On August 31, 2016, it was announced that Henderson would challenge Michael Chandler for the Bellator Lightweight Championship on November 19, 2016, at Bellator 165. Henderson lost the back-and-forth bout via split decision.

==== Post-title shot reign ====
Henderson faced Patricky Pitbull at Bellator 183 on September 23, 2017. He lost the fight via split decision.

Henderson faced returning Bellator veteran Roger Huerta in the main event at Bellator 196 on April 6, 2018. He won the fight via submission in the second round.

Henderson faced Saad Awad at Bellator 208 on October 13, 2018. He won the fight by unanimous decision.

In November 2018, Bellator officials revealed that Henderson had signed a new exclusive, long-term contract with Bellator.

Henderson next faced Adam Piccolotti at Bellator 220 on April 27, 2019. He won the fight via split decision. 8 out of 9 media scores gave it to Piccolotti.

Henderson faced Bellator newcomer Myles Jury in the headliner of Bellator 227 on September 27, 2019. He won the fight by unanimous decision.

On October 25, 2019, it was announced that Henderson would next rematch Michael Chandler at Bellator & Rizin: Japan on December 29, 2019. However, Henderson was forced to withdraw from the bout citing an injury and was replaced by Sidney Outlaw. The rematch was rescheduled to take place at Bellator 244 on June 6, 2020. However, the event was postponed due to the COVID-19 pandemic. The rematch eventually took place on August 7, 2020, at Bellator 243. Henderson lost the fight via knockout in the first round.

Henderson then moved up to Welterweight to face Jason Jackson on November 28, 2020, at Bellator 253. Jackson controlled a majority of the fight, winning via unanimous decision in an upset victory.

Henderson faced Brent Primus on October 16, 2021, at Bellator 268. He lost the fight via unanimous decision.

Henderson faced Islam Mamedov on January 29, 2022, at Bellator 273. He won the back-and-forth fight via split decision, ending a three-fight losing streak in what was his last fight on his prevailing contract.

On March 23, 2022, it was announced that Henderson had signed a new multi-fight contract with Bellator.

Henderson faced Peter Queally on September 23, 2022, at Bellator 285. He won the fight by unanimous decision.

==== Lightweight Grand Prix ====
Being announced as one of the participants of the $1 million Lightweight Grand Prix, in the quarterfinals, Henderson faced reigning champion Usman Nurmagomedov for the Bellator Lightweight World Championship on March 10, 2023, at Bellator 292. He lost the fight via rear-naked choke submission in the first round, and subsequently announced his retirement during the post-fight interview.

==== Global Fight League ====
On December 11, 2024, it was announced that Henderson was signed by Global Fight League.

Henderson was scheduled to face Anthony Pettis in the inaugural Global Fight League event on May 24, 2025 at GFL 1. However, all GFL events were postponed indefinitely.

=== Professional Fighters League ===
Henderson came back from retirement and faced Patrick Habirora on May 23, 2026, at PFL Brussels. He lost the fight via knockout in just 20 seconds in round one

== Professional grappling career ==
Henderson competed against fellow MMA veteran Ben Saunders in a superfight at UFC Fight Pass Invitational 1 on December 16, 2021, and won the match by unanimous decision. He then faced Demian Maia in the main event of Polaris 20 on June 25, 2022, losing the match by unanimous decision.

Henderson entered the ADCC Arizona Open on August 5, 2023, and went 3–1 in the 83 kg division.

Henderson competed in a welterweight no gi match against Neiman Gracie as the main event of ADXC 1 on October 20, 2023. He lost the match by submission.

== Boxing career ==
=== Stake Pro Tournament ===
On August 20, 2024 it was announced that Henderson would make his professional boxing debut in a tournament hosted by Stake on MF & DAZN: X Series 18 – Stake Pro Tournament Card on September 14 at the Vertu Motors Arena in Newcastle upon Tyne, England. His first opponent in the semifinals was American mixed martial artist Chris Avila with English professional boxer Idris Virgo vs English influencer Fes Batista in the other bracket. Henderson defeated Avila by unanimous decision and advanced to the finals, where he faced Idris Virgo in the co-main event. Henderson was defeated by Virgo by unanimous decision.

== Personal life ==
Henderson is a Christian and often refers to his faith in post-fight interviews. He is also a teetotaler, having never consumed alcohol or drugs in his life. Regarding said lifestyle, he stated:

I don't drink—I've never had a sip of alcohol. I've never had a puff of a cigarette or weed or anything like that. Growing up in Tacoma, that wasn't a very popular choice. I made a decision, and whenever it came up, I passed the dutchie to the left hand side ... People have seen that. They see I don't do the club scene. By people seeing that, that affects them in a bigger way than me talking about it.

Henderson and his wife Maria have four children: three sons and a daughter. Henderson proposed to his fiancée in the Octagon after his win over Gilbert Melendez at UFC on Fox 7.

== Championships and accomplishments ==
=== Mixed martial arts ===
- Ultimate Fighting Championship
  - UFC Lightweight Championship (One time; former)
    - Three successful title defenses
  - Tied (B.J. Penn, Frankie Edgar and Khabib Nurmagomedov) for the second most consecutive Lightweight title defenses in UFC history (3)
  - Unified the UFC Lightweight and Strikeforce Lightweight Championships
  - Fight of the Night (Three times) vs. Clay Guida, Frankie Edgar 1 and Brandon Thatch
  - Performance of the Night (One time) vs. Rustam Khabilov
  - UFC.com Awards
    - 2011: Ranked #2 Import of the Year, Ranked #5 Fighter of the Year & Ranked #3 Fight of the Year vs. Clay Guida
    - 2012: Fighter of the Year & Ranked #4 Fight of the Year vs. Frankie Edgar 1
- World Extreme Cagefighting
  - WEC Lightweight Championship (One time; former)
    - One successful title defense
  - Interim WEC Lightweight Championship (One time; former)
  - Fight of the Night (Two times) vs. Donald Cerrone and Anthony Pettis
  - Submission of the Night (One time) vs. Donald Cerrone
- ESPN
  - 2012 Fighter of the Year
  - 2012 Fight of the Year vs. Frankie Edgar at UFC 144
  - 2015 Best Fight of the Half-Year vs. Brandon Thatch
- Inside MMA
  - 2012 Fighter of the Year Bazzie Award
- MMA Weekly
  - 2012 Fighter of the Year
- Fight Matrix
  - 2012 Fighter of the Year
- MMA Fighting
  - 2012 #2 Ranked Fighter of the Year
  - 2010 Fight of the Year vs. Anthony Pettis on December 16
  - 2009 Fight of the Year vs. Donald Cerrone on October 10
- USA Today
  - 2010 Fight of the Year vs. Anthony Pettis on December 16
- Sports Illustrated
  - 2009 Fight of the Year vs. Donald Cerrone on October 10
- Sherdog
  - 2012 Fighter of the Year
  - 2009 Fight of the Year vs. Donald Cerrone on October 10
- Bleacher Report
  - 2012 Fighter of the Year
  - 2012 #2 Ranked Fight of the Year vs. Frankie Edgar
- FIGHT! Magazine
  - 2012 Fighter of the Year

=== Submission grappling ===
- International Brazilian Jiu-Jitsu Federation
  - 2011 World Jiu-Jitsu Championship Brown Belt Bronze Medalist
  - 2014 World Jiu Jitsu No-Gi Championship Black Belt Bronze Medalist
- Arizona State Brazilian Jiu-Jitsu Federation
  - AZSBJJF MVP of the Year (2010)
  - Arizona State Championship Brown Belt Middleweight Gold Medalist (Two times)
  - Arizona State Championship Purple Belt Middleweight Gold Medalist (Two times)
  - Arizona State Championship Openweight Gold Medalist (Three times)

=== Amateur wrestling ===
- National Association of Intercollegiate Athletics
  - NAIA All-American (2005, 2006)
- Washington Interscholastic Activities Association
  - WIAA 4A State Runner-Up (2001)
  - WIAA 4A All-State (2001)

== Mixed martial arts record ==
Professional record breakdown
43 matches	30 wins	13 losses
By knockout	5	3
By submission	9	3
By decision	16	7

Res.	Record	Opponent	Method	Event	Date	Round	Time	Location	Notes
Loss	30–13	Patrick Habirora	KO (punches)	PFL Brussels: Habirora vs. Henderson	May 23, 2026	1	0:20	Brussels, Belgium	Return to Welterweight.
Loss	30–12	Usman Nurmagomedov	Submission (rear-naked choke)	Bellator 292	March 10, 2023	1	2:37	San Jose, California, United States	Bellator Lightweight World Grand Prix Quarterfinal. For the Bellator Lightweight World Championship.
Win	30–11	Peter Queally	Decision (unanimous)	Bellator 285	September 23, 2022	5	5:00	Dublin, Ireland	Henderson was deducted one point in round 2 due to a groin strike.
Win	29–11	Islam Mamedov	Decision (split)	Bellator 273	January 29, 2022	3	5:00	Phoenix, Arizona, United States	
Loss	28–11	Brent Primus	Decision (unanimous)	Bellator 268	October 16, 2021	3	5:00	Phoenix, Arizona, United States	
Loss	28–10	Jason Jackson	Decision (unanimous)	Bellator 253	November 19, 2020	3	5:00	Uncasville, Connecticut, United States	Welterweight bout.
Loss	28–9	Michael Chandler	KO (punches)	Bellator 243	August 7, 2020	1	2:09	Uncasville, Connecticut, United States	
Win	28–8	Myles Jury	Decision (unanimous)	Bellator 227	September 27, 2019	3	5:00	Dublin, Ireland	
Win	27–8	Adam Piccolotti	Decision (split)	Bellator 220	April 27, 2019	3	5:00	San Jose, California, United States	
Win	26–8	Saad Awad	Decision (unanimous)	Bellator 208	October 13, 2018	3	5:00	Uniondale, New York, United States	
Win	25–8	Roger Huerta	Submission (guillotine choke)	Bellator 196	April 6, 2018	2	0:49	Budapest, Hungary	
Loss	24–8	Patricky Pitbull	Decision (split)	Bellator 183	September 23, 2017	3	5:00	San Jose, California, United States	
Loss	24–7	Michael Chandler	Decision (split)	Bellator 165	November 19, 2016	5	5:00	San Jose, California, United States	For the Bellator Lightweight World Championship.
Win	24–6	Patrício Pitbull	TKO (leg injury)	Bellator 160	August 26, 2016	2	2:26	Anaheim, California, United States	Return to Lightweight.
Loss	23–6	Andrey Koreshkov	Decision (unanimous)	Bellator 153	April 22, 2016	5	5:00	Uncasville, Connecticut, United States	For the Bellator Welterweight World Championship.
Win	23–5	Jorge Masvidal	Decision (split)	UFC Fight Night: Henderson vs. Masvidal	November 28, 2015	5	5:00	Seoul, South Korea	
Win	22–5	Brandon Thatch	Submission (rear-naked choke)	UFC Fight Night: Henderson vs. Thatch	February 14, 2015	4	3:58	Broomfield, Colorado, United States	Welterweight debut. Fight of the Night.
Loss	21–5	Donald Cerrone	Decision (unanimous)	UFC Fight Night: McGregor vs. Siver	January 18, 2015	3	5:00	Boston, Massachusetts, United States	
Loss	21–4	Rafael dos Anjos	KO (punch)	UFC Fight Night: Henderson vs. dos Anjos	August 23, 2014	1	2:31	Tulsa, Oklahoma, United States	
Win	21–3	Rustam Khabilov	Submission (rear-naked choke)	UFC Fight Night: Henderson vs. Khabilov	June 7, 2014	4	1:16	Albuquerque, New Mexico, United States	Performance of the Night.
Win	20–3	Josh Thomson	Decision (split)	UFC on Fox: Henderson vs. Thomson	January 25, 2014	5	5:00	Chicago, Illinois, United States	
Loss	19–3	Anthony Pettis	Submission (armbar)	UFC 164	August 31, 2013	1	4:31	Milwaukee, Wisconsin, United States	Lost the UFC Lightweight Championship.
Win	19–2	Gilbert Melendez	Decision (split)	UFC on Fox: Henderson vs. Melendez	April 20, 2013	5	5:00	San Jose, California, United States	Defended the UFC Lightweight Championship.
Win	18–2	Nate Diaz	Decision (unanimous)	UFC on Fox: Henderson vs. Diaz	December 8, 2012	5	5:00	Seattle, Washington, United States	Defended the UFC Lightweight Championship.
Win	17–2	Frankie Edgar	Decision (split)	UFC 150	August 11, 2012	5	5:00	Denver, Colorado, United States	Defended the UFC Lightweight Championship.
Win	16–2	Frankie Edgar	Decision (unanimous)	UFC 144	February 26, 2012	5	5:00	Saitama, Japan	Won the UFC Lightweight Championship. Fight of the Night.
Win	15–2	Clay Guida	Decision (unanimous)	UFC on Fox: Velasquez vs. dos Santos	November 12, 2011	3	5:00	Anaheim, California, United States	UFC Lightweight title eliminator. Fight of the Night.
Win	14–2	Jim Miller	Decision (unanimous)	UFC Live: Hardy vs. Lytle	August 14, 2011	3	5:00	Milwaukee, Wisconsin, United States	
Win	13–2	Mark Bocek	Decision (unanimous)	UFC 129	April 30, 2011	3	5:00	Toronto, Ontario, Canada	
Loss	12–2	Anthony Pettis	Decision (unanimous)	WEC 53	December 16, 2010	5	5:00	Glendale, Arizona, United States	Lost the WEC Lightweight Championship. Fight of the Night.
Win	12–1	Donald Cerrone	Submission (guillotine choke)	WEC 48	April 24, 2010	1	1:57	Sacramento, California, United States	Defended the WEC Lightweight Championship. Submission of the Night.
Win	11–1	Jamie Varner	Submission (guillotine choke)	WEC 46	January 10, 2010	3	2:41	Sacramento, California, United States	Won and unified the WEC Lightweight Championship.
Win	10–1	Donald Cerrone	Decision (unanimous)	WEC 43	October 10, 2009	5	5:00	San Antonio, Texas, United States	Won the interim WEC Lightweight Championship. Fight of the Night.
Win	9–1	Shane Roller	TKO (punches)	WEC 40	April 5, 2009	1	1:41	Chicago, Illinois, United States	
Win	8–1	Anthony Njokuani	Submission (guillotine choke)	WEC 38	January 25, 2009	2	0:42	San Diego, California, United States	
Win	7–1	Diego Saraiva	Decision (unanimous)	Evolution MMA 1	October 4, 2008	3	5:00	Phoenix, Arizona, United States	
Win	6–1	Ricardo Tirloni	Submission (guillotine choke)	MFC 17	July 25, 2008	2	3:49	Edmonton, Alberta, Canada	
Win	5–1	Mike Maestas	Submission (rear-naked choke)	MFC 16	May 9, 2008	3	4:11	Edmonton, Alberta, Canada	
Win	4–1	Bryan Corley	Submission (rear-naked choke)	Victory FC 21	December 7, 2007	1	2:36	Council Bluffs, Iowa, United States	
Win	3–1	David Dagloria	TKO (submission to punches)	Ultimate Combat Experience: Round 26: Episode 12	June 23, 2007	1	1:45	Ogden, Utah, United States	
Loss	2–1	Rocky Johnson	Technical Submission (anaconda choke)	Battlequest 5	March 31, 2007	1	0:46	Vail, Colorado, United States	Catchweight (160 lbs) bout.
Win	2–0	Allen Williams	TKO (punches)	Victory FC 18	February 16, 2007	1	1:37	Council Bluffs, Iowa, United States	
Win	1–0	Dan Gregary	TKO (submission to punches)	Midwest CF: Genesis	November 18, 2006	1	4:21	North Platte, Nebraska, United States	

== Karate Combat record ==
Professional record breakdown
1 match	0 wins	1 loss
By decision	0	1

Res.	Record	Opponent	Method	Event	Date	Round	Time	Location	Notes
Loss	0–1	Anthony Pettis	Decision (unanimous)	Karate Combat 43	December 15, 2023	3	3:00	Las Vegas, Nevada, United States	

== MF–Professional boxing record ==
2 fights	1 win	1 loss
By decision	1	1

No.	Result	Record	Opponent	Type	Round, time	Date	Location	Notes
2	Loss	1–1	Idris Virgo	UD	5	Sep 14, 2024	Vertu Motors Arena, Newcastle upon Tyne, England	Stake pro tournament final For inaugural MF pro light heavyweight title
1	Win	1–0	Chris Avila	UD	5	Sep 14, 2024	Vertu Motors Arena, Newcastle upon Tyne, England	Stake pro tournament semifinal

== Pay-per-view bouts ==
No.	Event	Fight	Venue	City	PPV Buys
1.	UFC 144	Edgar vs. Henderson	Saitama Super Arena	Saitama, Japan	375,000
2.	UFC 150	Henderson vs. Edgar 2	Pepsi Center	Denver, Colorado	190,000
3.	UFC 164	Henderson vs. Pettis 2	BMO Harris Bradley Center	Milwaukee, Wisconsin	270,000

== See also ==
- List of male mixed martial artists

Awards and achievements
New title	1st WEC Interim Lightweight Champion; October 10, 2009 - January 10, 2010	Vacant Won WEC Lightweight Champion
Preceded by Jamie Varner	6th WEC Lightweight Champion; January 10, 2010 - December 16, 2010	Succeeded by Anthony Pettis
Preceded by Frankie Edgar	5th UFC Lightweight Champion; February 26, 2012 – August 31, 2013	Succeeded by Anthony Pettis
