= Will Kerr =

American mixed martial arts fighter

William Kerr
- Born: October 29, 1982 (age 43); New London, Connecticut, United States
- Height: 5 ft 10 in (1.78 m)
- Weight: 155 lb (70 kg; 11.1 st)
- Division: Lightweight
- Reach: 69 in (180 cm)
- Stance: Orthodox
- Fighting out of: New London, Connecticut, United States
- Years active: 2005-2010

Mixed martial arts record
- Total: 12
- Wins: 9
- By knockout: 2
- By submission: 4
- By decision: 3
- Losses: 3
- By knockout: 2
- By submission: 1

Other information
- Mixed martial arts record from Sherdog

Will Kerr (born October 21, 1982) is a retired American mixed martial artist. A professional competitor from 2005 until 2010, he competed for World Extreme Cagefighting.

== Mixed martial arts career ==
=== World Extreme Cagefighting ===
Kerr made his WEC debut against Kamal Shalorus in November 2009 at WEC 44, replacing an injured Alex Karalexis, where he lost via TKO in the first round.

Kerr then faced Karen Darabedyan on June 20, 2010, at WEC 49. He won the fight via submission (armbar) in the first round.

Kerr faced Danny Castillo on December 16, 2010, at WEC 53. He lost the fight via KO in the first round.

== Mixed martial arts record ==
Professional record breakdown
12 matches	9 wins	3 losses
By knockout	2	2
By submission	4	1
By decision	3	0
Draws	0	

Res.	Record	Opponent	Method	Event	Date	Round	Time	Location	Notes
Loss	9–3	Danny Castillo	KO (punches)	WEC 53	December 16, 2010	1	1:25	Glendale, Arizona, United States	
Win	9–2	Karen Darabedyan	Submission (armbar)	WEC 49	June 20, 2010	1	1:20	Edmonton, Alberta, Canada	
Loss	8–2	Kamal Shalorus	TKO (punches)	WEC 44	November 18, 2009	1	1:26	Las Vegas, Nevada, United States	
Win	8–1	Pete Jeffrey	Submission (rear-naked choke)	FFP: Untamed 29	August 29, 2009	2	2:23	Marlborough, Massachusetts, United States	Defended the FPP Lightweight Championship.
Win	7–1	Marc Stevens	Decision (unanimous)	FFP: Untamed 23	September 27, 2008	3	5:00	Foxborough, Massachusetts, United States	Defended the FPP Lightweight Championship.
Win	6–1	Douglas Brown	Submission (heel hook)	FFP: Untamed 19	March 15, 2008	1	2:54	Plymouth, Massachusetts, United States	Defended the FPP Lightweight Championship.
Win	5–1	Matt Perry	TKO (punches)	FFP: Untamed 16	September 28, 2007	3	2:00	Westport, Massachusetts, United States	Defended the FPP Lightweight Championship.
Win	4–1	Jack Wilmarth	Submission (toe hold)	FFP: Untamed 13	May 18, 2007	1	3:59	Mansfield, Massachusetts, United States	Won the vacant FPP Lightweight Championship.
Loss	3–1	Ian Loveland	Submission (guillotine choke)	Ring of Combat 12	November 17, 2006	1	2:22	Atlantic City, New Jersey, United States	
Win	3–0	Joao Amaral	Decision (split)	Combat Zone 15: Marked Men	April 22, 2006	2	4:00	Revere, Massachusetts, United States	
Win	2–0	Nick Luongo	Decision (unanimous)	FFP: Untamed 3	March 4, 2006	2	5:00	Brockton, Massachusetts, United States	
Win	1–0	Cesario de Souza	KO (punches)	East Coast Fighting Alliance: The Colosseum	June 17, 2005	1		Worcester, Massachusetts, United States	
