= Kamal Shalorus =

Iranian martial artist

- Born: 1972–1977; Ardabil, Iran
- Native name: کمال شعله‌روز
- Other names: The Prince of Persia
- Height: 5 ft 8 in (1.73 m)
- Weight: 155 lb (70 kg; 11.1 st)
- Division: Lightweight
- Reach: 68.0 in (173 cm)
- Fighting out of: London, England; Austin, Texas, United States
- Years active: 2008—present

Mixed martial arts record
- Total: 16
- Wins: 9
- By knockout: 4
- By submission: 1
- By decision: 4
- Losses: 5
- By knockout: 1
- By submission: 3
- By decision: 1
- Draws: 2

Other information
- Mixed martial arts record from Sherdog
- Sports career
Medal record
Freestyle wrestling
British Senior Championships
Gold medal – first place	2001	85 kg / 187 lb

Kamal Shalorus (Persian: کمال شعله‌روز; born 1972–1977) is an Iranian professional mixed martial artist who competed in the Lightweight division of the WEC, UFC, and ONE Championship.

== Early life and background ==
Shalorus was born in an isolated rural community in northern Iran near Khalkhal. He has stated the men of his family were shepherds and wrestlers, and conditions were harsh, with very little infrastructure and no modern facilities such as electricity, a hospital, or school. Because of this, his birth was undocumented and he does not know his age. He was instead given the birth certificate of an older brother who had died. As such, several ages for Shalorus have been reported.

=== Wrestling ===
As a youth, Shalorus did well in wrestling and received the opportunity to train in Turkey, Greece, and eventually Britain, where he emigrated to in 1997. In 2001, Shalorus won the British Senior Championships in freestyle wrestling at 85 kg (187 lbs). It has been claimed by Shalorus and repeated by others that he was captain of the British wrestling team for the Olympics and world championships, specifically the 2004 Olympics. In reality, only one British wrestler qualified for the 2004 Olympics: Nate Ackerman, and United World Wrestling has no record of Shalorus competing at the Olympics, world championships, or any other notable international competitions.

Shalorus has also competed in grappling tournaments. He has a notable win over Joachim Hansen in the Abu Dhabi Combat Club (ADCC) European Trials.

== Mixed martial arts career ==
Shalorus became interested in MMA when he cross-trained with fighters in Britain, including Lee Murray and Alex Reid. Shalorus made his professional debut at the King of Kombat promotion in April 2008, winning by TKO. He compiled a 4-0-1 record before being signed by WEC. Shalorus has claimed to have trained with Pat Miletich, Erik Paulson, Relson Gracie, Billy Wicks, Neil Melanson, Phil Cardella and Randy Couture throughout his career.

=== World Extreme Cagefighting ===
He was scheduled to make his WEC debut against Alex Karalexis on 18 November 2009 at WEC 44, but a broken hand forced Karalexis off the card. Karalexis was replaced by WEC newcomer Will Kerr. Shalorus defeated Kerr via TKO in the first round.

Shalorus defeated previously unbeaten Dave Jansen via unanimous decision on 10 January 2010 at WEC 46.

Shalorus was expected to face former WEC Lightweight Champion Jamie Varner on 24 April 2010 at WEC 48, but Shalorus was forced off of the card with an injury. Varner/Shalorus took place on 20 June 2010 at WEC 49. The fight ended in a split draw (29–27 Varner, 29–27 Shalorus, and 28–28), with Shalorus being docked one point for multiple groin strikes.

Shalorus was expected to face Bart Palaszewski on 11 November 2010 at WEC 52, but the bout was moved to WEC 53 after Shalorus re-injured his hand that was broken during the bout with Varner. Shalorus won the fight via split decision (30–27, 28–29, and 29–28).

=== Ultimate Fighting Championship ===
In October 2010, World Extreme Cagefighting merged with the Ultimate Fighting Championship. As part of the merger, all WEC fighters were transferred to the UFC. Shalorus was the third Iranian fighter to ever compete for the UFC; the other two being Reza Nasri, and Reza Madadi.

In his UFC debut, Shalorus faced Jim Miller on 19 March 2011 at UFC 128. He lost the fight via TKO in the third round, the first loss of his professional career.

Shalorus next faced promotional newcomer and future UFC Lightweight Champion Khabib Nurmagomedov on 20 January 2012 at UFC on FX: Guillard vs. Miller. He lost the fight via submission in the third round.

Shalorus faced Rafael dos Anjos on 15 May 2012 at UFC on Fuel TV: Korean Zombie vs. Poirier. After being dropped with a head kick, Shalorus was submitted via rear naked choke in the first round and was subsequently released from the promotion.

=== ONE Fighting Championship ===
Nearly a year after being released from the UFC, Shalorus signed with the Asia's biggest MMA promotion, ONE FC promotion. He made his promotional debut against Eduard Folayang at ONE Fighting Championship 9 on 31 May 2013 and won the fight via unanimous decision.

Kamal faced Ariel Sexton on 14 March 2014 at ONE Fighting Championship 14. He won the fight via unanimous decision.

Shalorus faced Shinya Aoki for the ONE Lightweight Championship on 29 August 2014 at ONE Fighting Championship 19. He lost the fight via submission in the first round.

Shalorus fought Ev Ting at ONE: Throne of Tigers, losing by split decision. Shalorus has not fought since.

== Mixed martial arts record ==
Professional record breakdown
16 matches	9 wins	5 losses
By knockout	4	1
By submission	1	3
By decision	4	1
Draws	2	

Res.	Record	Opponent	Method	Event	Date	Round	Time	Location	Notes
Loss	9–5–2	Ev Ting	Decision (split)	ONE: Throne of Tigers	10 February 2017	3	5:00	Kuala Lumpur, Malaysia	
Loss	9–4–2	Shinya Aoki	Submission (rear-naked choke)	ONE FC: Reign of Champions	29 August 2014	1	2:15	Dubai, UAE	For the ONE FC Lightweight Championship.
Win	9–3–2	Ariel Sexton	Decision (unanimous)	ONE FC: War of Nations	14 March 2014	3	5:00	Kuala Lumpur, Malaysia	
Win	8–3–2	Eduard Folayang	Decision (unanimous)	ONE FC: Rise to Power	31 May 2013	3	5:00	Pasay, Philippines	
Loss	7–3–2	Rafael dos Anjos	Submission (rear-naked choke)	UFC on Fuel TV: The Korean Zombie vs. Poirier	15 May 2012	1	1:40	Fairfax, Virginia, United States	
Loss	7–2–2	Khabib Nurmagomedov	Submission (rear-naked choke)	UFC on FX: Guillard vs. Miller	20 January 2012	3	2:08	Nashville, Tennessee, United States	
Loss	7–1–2	Jim Miller	TKO (knee and punches)	UFC 128	19 March 2011	3	2:15	Newark, New Jersey, United States	
Win	7–0–2	Bart Palaszewski	Decision (split)	WEC 53	16 December 2010	3	5:00	Glendale, Arizona, United States	
Draw	6–0–2	Jamie Varner	Draw (split)	WEC 49	20 June 2010	3	5:00	Edmonton, Alberta, Canada	Shalorus was docked a point in round 2 for groin strikes.
Win	6–0–1	Dave Jansen	Decision (unanimous)	WEC 46	10 January 2010	3	5:00	Sacramento, California, United States	
Win	5–0–1	Will Kerr	TKO (punches)	WEC 44	18 November 2009	1	1:26	Las Vegas, Nevada, United States	
Win	4–0–1	Justin Miller	TKO (punches)	Supreme Warrior Championship 7: Discountenance	20 June 2009	2	0:32	Frisco, Texas, United States	
Draw	3–0–1	Mike Bronzoulis	Draw (majority)	King of Kombat 6: Fists of Fury	25 April 2009	5	5:00	Austin, Texas, United States	Bronzoulis missed weight (171 lb). Fight was changed to a non-title fight.
Win	3–0	Jonathan Evans	TKO (punches)	Extreme Challenge: War at the Shore	23 January 2009	1	0:35	Atlantic City, New Jersey, United States	
Win	2–0	Edwyn Jones	Submission (rear-naked choke)	Supreme Warrior Championship 2: Battlegrounds	28 November 2008	2	2:52	Frisco, Texas, United States	
Win	1–0	Jeff Davis	TKO (punches)	King of Kombat 3	5 April 2008	1	1:06	Austin, Texas, United States	Won the King of Kombat Welterweight Championship.

== See also ==
- List of ONE Championship alumni
