= Ricardo Tirloni =

Brazilian mixed martial artist

- Born: Ricardo de Tirloni; February 3, 1983 (age 43)
- Nationality: Brazilian and Italian
- Height: 5 ft 10 in (178 cm)
- Weight: 155 lb (70 kg; 11 st 1 lb)
- Division: Lightweight
- Fighting out of: Balneario Camboriu, Santa Catarina, Brazil
- Team: Astra Fight
- Rank: fourth degree black belt in Brazilian Jiu-Jitsu
- Years active: 2005–2021

Mixed martial arts record
- Total: 32
- Wins: 24
- By knockout: 9
- By submission: 10
- By decision: 5
- Losses: 8
- By knockout: 2
- By submission: 2
- By decision: 4

Other information
- Mixed martial arts record from Sherdog

Ricardo Tirloni (born February 3, 1983) is a Brazilian mixed martial artist who competes in the Lightweight division. A professional MMA competitor since 2005, Tirloni has fought in various promotions, including Bellator, the MFC, and Pancrase.

== Mixed martial arts career ==
=== Early career ===
Tirloni holds a black belt in Brazilian Jiu-Jitsu and trains at Ataque Duplo with the likes of Thiago Tavares and Nazareno Malegarie. In Tirloni's early career, he fought at MFC 17 against Benson Henderson, who would later go on to become the UFC Lightweight champion. Tirloni did not have a training team at the time, but was still competitive throughout the bout. He was able to knock Henderson down in the first round and had Henderson in a deep triangle choke in the second round. However, in the third round, Tirloni tired after a long period of wrestling with Henderson and he was forced to tap after Henderson caught him with a guillotine choke in the final round. Tirloni was otherwise unbeaten, recording thirteen victories prior to joining Bellator.

=== Bellator Fighting Championships ===
In late 2011, Tirloni joined Bellator Fighting Championships. He made his promotional debut against Steve Gable at Bellator 55. Tirloni was able to land multiple knees to Gable's head and body, as well as stop Gable's takedown attempts. Tirloni got into top position on the ground and was able to open up a cut above Gable's left eye. After Gable rolled onto his stomach, Tirloni locked in a rear naked choke, stopping the fight at 3:54 of the second round.

Tirloni was then booked to fight Chris Horodecki at Bellator 57, just three weeks after his win over Gable. However, Tirloni dislocated his ribs in training and was forced to withdraw from the bout. Tirloni was later entered into Bellator's season six lightweight tournament which began at Bellator 62. His opponent was Rick Hawn, a former United States representative in Judo at the 2004 Olympic Games. Hawn was also the runner-up of the previous season's welterweight tournament. Tirloni was able to land with a few leg kicks, but Hawn was able to continue pressing forward. Hawn then landed a right hand which dropped Tirloni. Hawn hit Tirloni with punches and hammerfists on the ground and the fight was stopped at 2:36 of the opening round.

Tirloni then entered into the Season 7 Lightweight tournament. He faced Rene Nazare in the opening round at Bellator 77. He won the fight via submission in the second round. He faced Dave Jansen in the semifinals on November 16, 2012 at Bellator 81 and lost via controversial split decision.

Tirloni competed in the Bellator Season 8 Lightweight tournament, fighting American Will Brooks in the opening round at Bellator 87 on January 31, 2013. Tirloni was defeated by unanimous decision (30-27, 30-27, 30-27).

Tirloni faced Rich Clementi on September 27, 2013 at Bellator 101 in the Quarterfinals of the Season Nine Lightweight tournament. He won the fight via unanimous decision.

Tirloni faced Alexander Sarnavskiy in the semifinal round and lost via submission in the first round.

=== Post-Bellator career ===
Tirloni faced Esteban Bonaveri at Arena Tour 2: Malegarie vs. Guerra on March 22, 2014. He won the fight via corner stoppage TKO.

In June 2015, Tirloni defeated fellow Bellator veteran E. J. Brooks in the main event of Arena Tour 6.

== Mixed martial arts record ==
Professional record breakdown
32 matches	24 wins	8 losses
By knockout	9	2
By submission	10	2
By decision	5	4

Res.	Record	Opponent	Method	Event	Date	Round	Time	Location	Notes
Loss	24–8	Shamil Zavurov	TKO (punches)	Eagle Fighting Championship 37	June 18, 2021	2	2:12	Almaty, Kazakhstan	
Win	24–7	Ramon Cardozo	Submission (anaconda choke)	Brave CF 15:Colombia	September 7, 2018	2	0:32	Bucaramanga, Colombia	
Loss	23–7	Akira Okada	Decision (unanimous)	Pancrase 293	February 4, 2018	3	5:00	Tokyo, Japan	
Win	23–6	Enrique Marín	KO (punch)	Fight Club Slam 2017	October 7, 2017	1	3:16	Leganés, Spain	
Win	22–6	Fabricio Oliveira	Submission (arm-triangle choke)	Aspera Fighting Championship 50	March 18, 2017	2	2:01	Santa Catarina, Brazil	
Win	21–6	Jadison Costa	TKO (punches)	XFC i 12	November 28, 2015	2	2:40	São Paulo, Brazil	
Win	20–6	E. J. Brooks	Decision (unanimous)	Arena Tour 6: Tirloni vs. Brooks	June 26, 2015	3	5:00	Córdoba, Argentina	
Win	19–6	Alejandro Solano Rodriguez	Decision (unanimous)	CP: Calvo Promotions 5	April 23, 2015	3	5:00	San José, Costa Rica	
Loss	18–6	Pat Healy	Decision (split)	Arena Tour 4: Healy vs. Tirloni	December 20, 2014	3	5:00	Buenos Aires, Argentina	
Win	18–5	Todd Moore	TKO (knees)	Arena Tour 3: Moore vs. Tirloni	August 15, 2014	1	N/A	Buenos Aires, Argentina	
Win	17–5	Esteban Bonaveri	TKO (corner stoppage)	Arena Tour 2: Malegarie vs. Guerra	March 22, 2014	2	N/A	Buenos Aires, Argentina	
Loss	16–5	Alexander Sarnavskiy	Submission (triangle choke)	Bellator 105	October 25, 2013	1	1:08	Rio Rancho, New Mexico, United States	Bellator Season 9 Lightweight Tournament Semifinal
Win	16–4	Rich Clementi	Decision (unanimous)	Bellator 101	September 27, 2013	3	5:00	Portland, Oregon, United States	Bellator Season 9 Lightweight Tournament Quarterfinal
Loss	15–4	Will Brooks	Decision (unanimous)	Bellator 87	January 31, 2013	3	5:00	Mount Pleasant, Michigan, United States	Bellator Season 8 Lightweight Tournament Quarterfinal
Loss	15–3	Dave Jansen	Decision (split)	Bellator 81	November 16, 2012	3	5:00	Rhode Island, United States	Bellator Season 7 Lightweight Tournament Semifinal
Win	15–2	Renê Nazare	Submission (D'arce choke)	Bellator 77	October 19, 2012	2	1:14	Reading, Pennsylvania, United States	Bellator Season 7 Lightweight Tournament Quarterfinal
Loss	14–2	Rick Hawn	KO (punches)	Bellator 62	March 23, 2012	1	2:36	Laredo, Texas, United States	Bellator Season 6 Lightweight Tournament Quarterfinal
Win	14–1	Steve Gable	Submission (rear-naked choke)	Bellator 55	October 22, 2011	2	3:54	Yuma, Arizona, United States	
Win	13–1	Mauro Chaulet	KO (head kick)	Centurion MMA 2	July 9, 2011	1	1:57	Itajai, Brazil	
Win	12–1	Taedas Mendonca	Decision (unanimous)	Cage Brazil Championship	May 14, 2011	3	5:00	Campo Grande, Brazil	
Win	11–1	Alexandre Pedroso	Submission (D'arce choke)	Colizeu Fight Championship	November 20, 2010	1	1:46	Joaçaba, Brazil	
Win	10–1	Sidmar Neco	Submission (anaconda choke)	Brazilian Fight League 7	August 7, 2010	1	0:53	Blumenau, Brazil	
Win	9–1	Brian Cobb	Submission (rear-naked choke)	Top Combat Championship 1	September 26, 2009	1	1:59	San Juan, Puerto Rico	
Win	8–1	Dan Russom	Submission (triangle choke)	AOF 3 - Rumble at Robarts 3	June 13, 2009	2	2:56	Sarasota, Florida, United States	
Win	7–1	Nilson Pereira	Decision (unanimous)	Floripa Fight 5	March 7, 2009	3	5:00	Florianópolis, Brazil	
Win	6–1	Ernandez Gonzales	Submission (triangle choke)	Spartan 1	January 10, 2009	1	4:12	Itapema, Brazil	
Win	5–1	Pedro Dinamite	KO (punch)	Balneário Camboriú Fight	December 1, 2008	2	4:19	Balneário Camboriú, Brazil	
Win	4–1	Murilo Faraco	Submission (rear-naked choke)	Dukeoom of Asgar	October 1, 2008	1	0:51	Florianópolis, Brazil	
Loss	3–1	Benson Henderson	Submission (guillotine choke)	MFC 17 - Hostile Takeover	July 25, 2008	2	3:49	Enoch, Canada	
Win	3–0	Anthony Morrison	KO (punch)	Combat Sport Challenge: Tirloni vs. Morrison	September 29, 2007	1	0:40	Richmond, Virginia, United States	
Win	2–0	Jason Howard	KO (knees and punches)	Ultimate Cage Fighting - Rage in the Cage	September 20, 2007	1	0:59	Murray, Kentucky, United States	
Win	1–0	Alessandro Cordeiro	TKO (doctor stoppage)	X-treme Combat	June 5, 2005	2	4:15	Brazil	
