= Deividas Taurosevičius =

Lithuanian martial artist

- Born: August 28, 1977 (age 49); Šiauliai, Lithuanian SSR, Soviet Union
- Other names: Taurus
- Nationality: Lithuanian
- Height: 5 ft 8 in (1.73 m)
- Weight: 146 lb (66 kg; 10.4 st)
- Division: Lightweight; Featherweight
- Reach: 68 in (170 cm)
- Fighting out of: Copiague, New York, United States; Farmingdale, New York, United States
- Team: Renzo Gracie Academy; Team Panza; Taurus MMA
- Rank: Second degree black belt in Brazilian Jiu-Jitsu
- Years active: 2002-2013

Mixed martial arts record
- Total: 22
- Wins: 17
- By submission: 13
- By decision: 4
- Losses: 5
- By decision: 5

Other information
- Mixed martial arts record from Sherdog

Deividas Taurosevičius (born August 28, 1977) is a Lithuanian retired mixed martial artist who last competed in the Featherweight division. A professional competitor from 2002 until 2013, he competed for the WEC, Bellator, the Cage Fury Fighting Championships, and for the New York Pitbulls of the IFL.

== Background ==
Originally from Lithuania, Taurosevičius was a talented rugby player, competing for the national team, and winning an award given to the best player in the country in 1999. He then moved to the United States with the desire of continuing his professional career, but was not content with playing in America as he felt the sport did not have enough respect in the country. In 2002, Taurosevičius turned professional with his MMA career.

== Mixed martial arts career ==
=== Early career ===
Taurosevičius started his professional MMA career in 2002, primarily competing on cards in Massachusetts and New Jersey. In early 2007, he began fighting for the New York Pitbulls in the International Fight League.

Taurosevičius went 2–1 with the promotion, his lone loss being at the hands of Ryan Schultz in his last appearance, which was for the promotion's Lightweight Championship.

=== World Extreme Cagefighting ===
In September 2008, he signed with Affliction and was scheduled to face Mark Hominick on the Affliction: Trilogy undercard on August 1, 2009. The match was subsequently picked up by Zuffa and was scheduled to take place at WEC 43. However, Hominick was replaced by Javier Vazquez. Taurosevicius won by split decision.

Taurosevičius defeated previously unbeaten Mackens Semerzier via unanimous decision at WEC 46.

Taurosevičius lost via majority decision to LC Davis on March 6, 2010 at WEC 47.

=== Bellator ===
Taurosevičius then competed for Bellator at Bellator 33 against Wilson Reis and was defeated via split decision. He has most recently competed for the Ring of Combat promotion based out of New Jersey, winning the promotion's Featherweight Championship and successfully defending his title three times.

== Personal life ==
Taurosevičius is married.

== Mixed martial arts record ==
Professional record breakdown
22 matches	17 wins	5 losses
By knockout	0	0
By submission	13	0
By decision	4	5
Draws	0	

Res.	Record	Opponent	Method	Event	Date	Round	Time	Location	Notes
Win	17–5	Guillermo Serment	Submission (rear-naked choke)	Ring of Combat 44	April 5, 2013	2	2:20	Atlantic City, New Jersey, United States	Defended the Ring of Combat Featherweight Championship.
Win	16–5	Frank Caraballo	Submission (reverse triangle choke)	Ring of Combat 43	January 25, 2013	1	3:38	Atlantic City, New Jersey, United States	Defended the Ring of Combat Featherweight Championship.
Win	15–5	Mike Santiago	Submission (armbar)	Ring of Combat 42	September 14, 2012	2	3:50	Atlantic City, New Jersey, United States	Defended the Ring of Combat Featherweight Championship.
Win	14–5	Marlon Moraes	Submission (arm-triangle choke)	Ring of Combat 38	November 18, 2011	1	2:34	Atlantic City, New Jersey, United States	Won the Ring of Combat Featherweight Championship.
Win	13–5	Ronnie Rogers	Submission (rear-naked choke)	Ring of Combat 37	September 9, 2011	2	2:24	Atlantic City, New Jersey, United States	
Loss	12–5	Wilson Reis	Decision (split)	Bellator 33	October 21, 2010	3	5:00	Philadelphia, Pennsylvania, United States	
Loss	12–4	LC Davis	Decision (majority)	WEC 47	March 6, 2010	3	5:00	Columbus, Ohio, United States	
Win	12–3	Mackens Semerzier	Decision (unanimous)	WEC 46	January 10, 2010	3	5:00	Sacramento, California, United States	
Win	11–3	Javier Vazquez	Decision (split)	WEC 43	October 10, 2009	3	5:00	San Antonio, Texas, United States	Return to Featherweight.
Loss	10–3	Ryan Schultz	Decision (unanimous)	IFL 2007 Team Championship	May 16, 2008	5	4:00	Uncasville, Connecticut, United States	For the IFL Lightweight Championship.
Win	10–2	Bart Palaszewski	Technical Submission (armbar)	IFL 2007 Team Championship	September 20, 2007	2	1:30	Hollywood, Florida, United States	
Win	9–2	Savant Young	Decision (unanimous)	IFL: 2007 Semifinals	August 2, 2007	3	4:00	East Rutherford, New Jersey, United States	
Win	8–2	Kevin Roddy	Submission (armbar)	CFFC 5: Two Worlds, One Cage	June 23, 2007	1	4:49	Atlantic City, New Jersey, United States	
Win	7–2	Zac George	Submission (arm-triangle choke)	IFL: Connecticut	April 11, 2007	1	3:12	Uncasville, Connecticut, United States	
Win	6–2	Dan Lauzon	Submission (rear-naked choke)	CFFC3: Battleground	January 19, 2007	2	1:15	Atlantic City, New Jersey, United States	Won the CFFC Lightweight Championship.
Win	5–2	Anthony Morrison	Submission (triangle choke)	CFFC2: Cage Fury Fighting Championships 2	October 6, 2006	1	2:09	Atlantic City, New Jersey, United States	
Loss	4–2	Frankie Edgar	Decision (unanimous)	RF 13: Battle at the Beach	August 5, 2006	3	5:00	Wildwood, New Jersey, United States	Lost the Reality Fighting Lightweight Championship.
Win	4–1	Jerome Isip	Technical Submission (guillotine choke)	RF 11: Reality Fighting 11	February 11, 2006	1	N/A	Atlantic City, New Jersey, United States	Won the Reality Fighting Lightweight Championship.
Win	3–1	Tony Barber	Submission (rear-naked choke)	MD22: Mass Destruction 22	December 10, 2005	1	3:01	Fall River, Massachusetts, United States	
Win	2–1	James Jones	Decision (unanimous)	RF9: Reality Fighting 9	August 6, 2005	2	5:00	Wildwood, New Jersey, United States	
Win	1–1	Austin Philbin	Submission (guillotine choke)	ECFA: Colosseum	June 17, 2005	1	N/A	Truro, Massachusetts, United States	Lightweight debut.
Loss	0–1	Mike Acosta	Decision	SF 1: Bragging Rights	November 9, 2002	2	5:00	Bayonne, New Jersey, United States	Featherweight debut.
