= Karen Darabedyan =

American mixed martial arts fighter

- Born: December 18, 1986 (age 39); Armenian SSR, Soviet Union
- Nationality: Armenian
- Height: 5 ft 7 in (1.70 m)
- Weight: 170 lb (77 kg; 12 st)
- Division: Lightweight
- Reach: 68 in (170 cm)
- Stance: Orthodox
- Fighting out of: Glendale, California, United States
- Team: Hayastan MMA Academy; Main Event Gym; Glendale Fight Club

Mixed martial arts record
- Total: 20
- Wins: 14
- By knockout: 3
- By submission: 5
- By decision: 6
- Losses: 6
- By knockout: 2
- By submission: 2
- By decision: 2

Other information
- Website: https://karendarabedyan.com
- Mixed martial arts record from Sherdog

Karen Darabedyan (Armenian: Կարեն Դարաբեդյան, born December 18, 1986) is an Armenian-American professional mixed martial artist and the founder of KD MMA Training Center in Glendale, CA. He is best known for fighting in WEC's lightweight division. Darabedyan is a training partner of Karo Parisyan and Manvel Gamburyan. He had a 12-0 amateur boxing record before he began MMA.

== Biography ==
Darabedyan is an Armenian mixed martial arts fighter who has positioned himself as a well-rounded athlete through diverse and extensive training. He began studying karate at the age of 5 and taekwondo at the age of 9, earning his black belt in both by age 18.

He began expanding his martial arts training in junior high by taking up boxing, kick boxing, judo and wrestling, earning a black belt in judo by age 16 and achieving a 12-0 amateur boxing record by 18. During high school, he claimed two judo state championship titles and placed third in the nation. At age 16, Darabedyan entered the world of grappling, placing 1st in the Intermediate Men's No-Gi Lightweight division at the 2004 Grapplers Quest West 5 and winning 1st place at under 189.9 pounds in the 2007 World Grappling Games Best of West.

Drawing on his diverse training, Darabedyan competed in his first mixed martial arts fight at age 18, claiming a win in the first round by KO. Since then, he has compiled a 9–4 record. Despite Darabedyan's strong judo and grappling background, he tends to favor keeping the fight on his feet and striking.

He trained with Gokor Chivichyan and Gene LeBell as well as Roma Kalantaryan at Main Event Gym in Glendale.

== WEC career ==
He made his WEC debut by defeating former WEC Lightweight Champion Rob McCullough on November 18, 2009, at WEC 44.

Darabedyan lost via armbar to Bart Palaszewski on March 6, 2010, at WEC 47.

He then faced Will Kerr on June 20, 2010, at WEC 49. He lost the fight via submission in the first round.

Darabedyan was expected to face fellow WEC veteran Marcus Hicks on September 11, 2010, at Shark Fights 13 but Hicks was forced off the card with an injury. Instead, he faced Daniel Mason-Straus and lost the fight via unanimous decision.

== Mixed martial arts record ==
Professional record breakdown
20 matches	14 wins	6 losses
By knockout	3	2
By submission	5	2
By decision	6	2

Res.	Record	Opponent	Method	Event	Date	Round	Time	Location	Notes
Win	14–6	Dave Terrel	Decision (unanimous)	Extreme Fighters MMA - Ready for War	October 7, 2017	3	5:00	Long Beach, California, United States	
Win	13–6	Sam Liera	Submission (rear-naked choke)	Legacy Fighting Alliance 13	June 2, 2017	2	1:46	Burbank, California, United States	
Loss	12–6	Christos Giagos	TKO (punches)	RFA 38: Moises vs. Emmers	June 3, 2016	1	1:42	Costa Mesa, California, United States	
Win	12–5	Joe Condon	Submission (guillotine choke)	CXF 2 - Gold Rush	April 22, 2016	1	1:12	Studio City, California, United States	
Win	11–5	Pablo Sabori	Submission (guillotine choke)	Lights Out / Bash Entertainment - Fight Night at Sportsmen's Lodge 5	March 4, 2016	1	4:07	Los Angeles, California, United States	
Win	10–5	L. John Borges	Submission (guillotine choke)	NFA: Valley Invasion 4	August 8, 2014	1	1:09	Woodland Hills, California, United States	Return to Lightweight
Loss	9–5	Mike Brazzle	TKO (punches)	ShoFight 20	June 16, 2012	1	4:15	Springfield, Missouri, United States	Welterweight
Loss	9–4	Daniel Mason-Straus	Decision (unanimous)	Shark Fights 13: Jardine vs Prangley	September 11, 2010	3	5:00	Amarillo, Texas, United States	
Loss	9–3	Will Kerr	Submission (armbar)	WEC 49	June 20, 2010	1	1:20	Edmonton, Alberta, Canada	
Loss	9–2	Bart Palaszewski	Submission (armbar)	WEC 47	March 6, 2010	1	4:40	Columbus, Ohio, United States	
Win	9–1	Rob McCullough	Decision (split)	WEC 44	November 18, 2009	3	5:00	Las Vegas, Nevada, United States	
Win	8–1	Estevan Payan	TKO (punches)	Shark Fights 6: Stars & Stripes	September 12, 2009	1	1:20	Amarillo, Texas, United States	
Win	7–1	Joe Camacho	TKO	Call to Arms I	May 16, 2009	1	5:00	Ontario, California, United States	
Win	6–1	Tony Ferguson	Decision (unanimous)	All Star Boxing: Caged in the Cannon	February 6, 2009	3	5:00	Montebello, California, United States	
Win	5–1	Saad Awad	Decision (split)	Gladiator Challenge	January 25, 2009	3	5:00	Los Angeles, California, United States	
Win	4–1	Jared Papazian	Submission (rear naked choke)	Total Fighting Alliance 12	September 13, 2008	1	1:36	Long Beach, California, United States	
Win	3–1	Anthony McDavitt	Decision (unanimous)	Long Beach Fight Night	August 17, 2008	3	5:00	Long Beach, California, United States	
Loss	2–1	Koji Oishi	Decision (unanimous)	Plainum Fighting Productions - Ring of Fire	December 9, 2007	3	5:00	Manila, Philippines	
Win	2–0	Luke Adams	Decision (unanimous)	EFWC - The Untamed	October 6, 2007	3	5:00	Anaheim, California, United States	
Win	1–0	Joe Alvarado	TKO	California Xtreme Fighting 2	July 15, 2006	1	2:06	Upland, California, United States	

== See also ==
- List of male mixed martial artists
