= WEC 44 =

WEC MMA event in 2009

WEC 44: Brown vs. Aldo
- The poster for WEC 44: Brown vs. Aldo
- Promotion: World Extreme Cagefighting
- Date: November 18, 2009
- Venue: The Pearl at The Palms
- City: Paradise, Nevada
- Attendance: 1,835
- Total gate: $131,200

Event chronology
WEC 43: Cerrone vs. Henderson	WEC 44: Brown vs. Aldo	WEC 45: Cerrone vs. Ratcliff

WEC 44: Brown vs. Aldo was a mixed martial arts event held by World Extreme Cagefighting. It took place on November 18, 2009 at The Pearl at The Palms in Las Vegas, Nevada.

== Background ==
Anthony Pettis was originally slated to face Rob McCullough at this event, but was forced from the bout due to an injury, and was replaced by promotional newcomer Karen Darabedyan.

A lightweight bout between Danny Castillo and Alex Karalexis was once attached to this event, though it was later scrapped. Both men remained on the card with new opponents, as Castillo was matched with Shane Roller, while Karalexis was expected to face the debuting Kamal Shalorus. However, Karalexis had to bow out of the Shalorus matchup due to a broken hand, and was replaced by fellow WEC newcomer Will Kerr.

The event drew an estimated 414,000 viewers on Versus.

== Results ==
Main card
Weight class				Method	Round	Time	Notes
Featherweight	José Aldo	def	Mike Brown (c)	TKO (strikes)	2	1:20	(Note: For the WEC Featherweight Championship.)
Featherweight	Manvel Gamburyan	def	Leonard Garcia	Decision (unanimous) (30–27, 29–28, 29–28)	3	5:00
Lightweight	Karen Darabedyan	def	Rob McCullough	Decision (split) (30–27, 27–30, 29–28)	3	5:00
Lightweight	Shane Roller	def	Danny Castillo	Submission (rear naked choke)	3	3:32
Lightweight	Kamal Shalorus	def	Will Kerr	TKO (strikes)	1	1:26
Preliminary card
Featherweight	LC Davis	def	Diego Nunes	Decision (unanimous) (30–26, 30–26, 30–26)	3	5:00	(Note: Nunes was docked one point in round 3 for repeatedly grabbing the fence.)
Featherweight	Cub Swanson	def	John Franchi	Submission (guillotine choke)	3	4:50
Bantamweight	Antonio Banuelos	def	Kenji Osawa	Decision (unanimous) (29–28, 29–28, 29–28)	3	5:00
Lightweight	Ricardo Lamas	def	James Krause	Decision (unanimous) (30–27, 30–27, 30–27)	3	5:00
Bantamweight	Frank Gomez	def	Seth Dikun	Decision (unanimous) (30–27, 30–27, 29–28)	3	5:00

== Bonus Awards ==
Fighters were awarded $10,000 bonuses.

- Fight of the Night: (United States) Cub Swanson vs. (United States) John Franchi
- Knockout of the Night: (Brazil) José Aldo
- Submission of the Night: (United States) Shane Roller

== Reported payout ==
The following is the reported payout to the fighters as reported to the Nevada State Athletic Commission. It does not include sponsor money or "locker room" bonuses often given by the WEC and also do not include the WEC's traditional "fight night" bonuses.

- José Aldo: $26,000 (includes $13,000 win bonus) def. Mike Brown: ($15,000)
- Manvel Gamburyan: $36,000 ($18,000 win bonus) def. Leonard Garcia: ($14,000)
- Karen Darabedyan: $6,000 ($3,000 win bonus) def. Rob McCullough: ($20,000)
- Shane Roller: $24,000 ($12,000 win bonus) def. Danny Castillo: ($9,500)
- Kamal Shalorus: $6,000 ($3,000 win bonus) def. Will Kerr: ($2,000)
- LC Davis: $14,000 ($7,000 win bonus) def. Diego Nunes: ($5,000)
- Cub Swanson: $18,000 ($9,000 win bonus) def. John Franchi: ($4,000)
- Antonio Banuelos: $12,000 ($6,000 win bonus) def. Kenji Osawa: ($6,000)
- Ricardo Lamas: $8,000 ($4,000 win bonus) def. James Krause: ($2,000)
- Frank Gomez: $6,000 ($3,000 win bonus) def. Seth Dikun: ($3,000)

== See also ==
- World Extreme Cagefighting
- List of World Extreme Cagefighting champions
- List of WEC events
- 2009 in WEC
