= MFC 17 =

Maximum Fighting Championship MMA event in 2008

MFC 17: Hostile Takeover
- Promotion: Maximum Fighting Championship
- Date: July 25, 2008
- Venue: River Cree Resort and Casino
- City: Enoch, Alberta

Event chronology
MFC 16: Anger Management	MFC 17: Hostile Takeover	MFC 18: Famous

MFC 17: Hostile Takeover was a mixed martial arts event held by the Maximum Fighting Championship (MFC) on July 25, 2008, in Enoch, Alberta.

== Background ==
Ryan Ford was expected to face Joe Jordan for the vacant MFC Welterweight title, but Jordan was sidelined due to a back injury. Pat Healy stepped in to replace Joe Jordan.

== Fight Card ==
Main Card
Weight class				Method	Round	Time	Notes
Welterweight	Pat Healy	def.	Ryan Ford	Submission (Armbar)	3	3:00	(Note: For the MFC Welterweight Championship)
Lightweight	Donald Sanchez	def.	Jason Maxwell	Submission (Triangle Choke)	2	4:03
Lightweight	Benson Henderson	def.	Ricardo Tirloni	Submission (Guillotine Choke)	2	3:49
Middleweight	Ron Faircloth	def.	Levi Avera	Submission (Rear-Naked Choke)	2	2:57
Light Heavyweight	Aron Lofton	def.	Dwayne Lewis	KO (Punch)	1	0:17
Preliminary card
Lightweight	Ryan Machan	def.	Ryan Heck	TKO (Punches)	1	4:19
Welterweight	Mike Sorenson	def.	Lemont Davis	TKO (Punches)	1	2:52
Heavyweight	Jay Whitford	def.	Jason Kuchera	Submission (Armbar)	2	4:31
Lightweight	Gavin Neil	def.	Evan Sanguin	TKO (Punches)	1	4:11
Middleweight	Elliot Duff	def.	Brandon Curts	TKO (Punches)	1	4:30
Welterweight	Jason Zorthian	def.	Jesse Clarke	Decision (Unanimous)	3	5:00

== See also ==
- Maximum Fighting Championship
- List of Maximum Fighting Championship events
- 2008 in Maximum Fighting Championship
