= James Krause (fighter) =

American mixed martial arts fighter

- Born: James Leo Krause; June 4, 1986 (age 40); Newport News, Virginia, U.S.
- Nickname: The James Krause
- Height: 6 ft 2 in (188 cm)
- Weight: 186 lb (84 kg; 13 st 4 lb)
- Division: Lightweight; Welterweight; Middleweight
- Reach: 73 1/2 in (187 cm)
- Fighting out of: Lee's Summit, Missouri, U.S.
- Team: Grindhouse MMA / Glory MMA and Fitness (until 2022)
- Rank: 2nd degree black belt in Brazilian Jiu-Jitsu under Leonardo Peçanha
- Years active: 2007–2020

Mixed martial arts record
- Total: 36
- Wins: 28
- By knockout: 8
- By submission: 14
- By decision: 6
- Losses: 8
- By knockout: 1
- By submission: 2
- By decision: 5

Other information
- Mixed martial arts record from Sherdog

James Leo Krause (born June 4, 1986) is an American entrepreneur and former mixed martial artist. He competed in the welterweight division of the Ultimate Fighting Championship (UFC). A professional from 2007 to 2020, Krause has made a name for himself fighting all over the United States, competing mainly in the Midwest region. Krause has also competed for organizations such as Bellator, WEC, the RFA, and Titan FC. He previously taught Brazilian Jiu Jitsu and mixed martial arts out of his formerly owned gym, Glory MMA & Fitness in Lee's Summit, Missouri. He was also founding a local promotion, Kansas City Fighting Alliance. He owns some Metro PCS stores in the Kansas City metropolitan area.

== Background ==
Krause was born in Newport News, Virginia, but moved to Odessa, Missouri, after his parents got divorced when he was two years old. At the age of seven, Krause began training in karate. Krause began attending Odessa High School in Missouri starting in 2001 where he competed in wrestling and graduated in 2004. Krause opted out of attending college, and instead began working full-time before finding MMA at the age of 19.

== Mixed martial arts career ==
=== Early career ===
Before turning professional in 2007, Krause had a successful amateur career with a record of 18–1, holding two championships, and for six consecutive months was ranked as the number one amateur in the country. On November 28, 2007, Krause made his long awaited professional debut for Kansas', Titan Fighting Championships, defeating Kevin Hengler via technical submission in the first round. Throughout 2008 and 2009, Krause fought all over the Midwest, mostly in Missouri, collecting a 10–0 record with all of his wins coming from stoppages.

=== World Extreme Cagefighting ===
In April 2009 Krause signed on with the World Extreme Cagefighting. He made his debut for the promotion on June 7, 2009, at WEC 41 against Donald Cerrone. Krause was a late-replacement for Rich Crunkilton. Krause lost the fight via first-round submission.

Krause then fought Ricardo Lamas on the preliminary card of WEC 44 on November 18, 2009. After being controlled on the ground for three rounds, Krause lost the fight via unanimous decision. Krause was released from his contract after going 0–2 for the promotion.

=== Bellator Fighting Championships ===
Krause signed with Bellator Fighting Championships in April 2010, replacing Ferrid Kheder in the Bellator Season Two Lightweight Tournament. His first bout of the tournament was originally slated for Bellator 15 but was instead moved to a week earlier and held on the Bellator 14 card. Krause fought Season One's runner-up, Toby Imada, losing via second-round armbar submission. The loss took Krause out of the tournament.

Krause was expected to compete on the Bellator 16 card against an unnamed opponent but was forced off the card due to an injury.

=== Titan Fighting Championships ===
After being released from Bellator, Krause re-signed with Titan Fighting Championships. His return came at Titan Fighting Championships 17 on March 25, 2011, against Nathan Schut. Krause won the fight via TKO after connecting with a head kick.

At Titan Fighting Championships 19 on July 29, 2011, Krause fought Pride FC and Sengoku veteran, Clay French, in the main event. Krause lost the fight via split decision.

Two months after his loss to French, Krause fought Steve Schneider at Shark Fights 19, winning via second-round submission (rear-naked choke).

Krause fought Sean Wilson at Titan Fighting Championships 20 on September 23, 2011, winning via first-round submission.

=== Resurrection Fighting Alliance ===
Krause was scheduled to fight UFC veteran, Chad Reiner, at the inaugural event for Resurrection Fighting Alliance on Friday, December 16, 2011. However, a few days before the fight, Reiner was forced off the card due to an injury. After going through five different opponents, Krause fought Mark Korzenowski. Krause won the fight via head kick knockout only seconds into the first round.

=== The Ultimate Fighter ===
Krause was selected as one of 32 fighters to compete on The Ultimate Fighter: Live which aired in March, 2012. In order to gain entry into the Ultimate Fighter house, and become an official cast member, the fighters had to win an exhibition bout with another potential contestant. Krause was matched up against the relative unknown Team Black House fighter Justin Lawrence. Krause was upset by Lawrence, losing the fight via first round TKO, and ending Krause's time on The Ultimate Fighter.

=== Return to Resurrection Fighting Alliance ===
After being eliminated from the Ultimate Fighter, Krause returned to his contract with Resurrection Fighting Alliance. His second fight with the promotion took place at Resurrection Fighting Alliance 3 on June 30, 2012. Krause fought a fellow TUF castaway in Amir Khillah. After three entertaining back and forth rounds, Krause was announced the winner via split decision.

Krause next fought at Resurrection Fighting Alliance 4 which took place on November 2, 2012, in Las Vegas, Nevada. He fought undefeated Brazilian prospect, Guilherme Trindade. Only 31 seconds into the first round Krause won the fight via KO. With the fight ending so quickly, Resurrection Fighting Alliance offered Krause a spot on the Resurrection Fighting Alliance 5 card set to take place November 30, only a month after his latest win. Krause fought journeyman Joe Jordan on the RFA 5 card, winning the fight via submission in the third round. During the post fight interview, Krause called out to UFC matchmaker, Joe Silva, proclaiming, "Joe Silva, give me a call sometime, buddy,".

Krause then faced Toby Imada in a rematch at RFA 6 on January 18, 2013. He won the fight via unanimous decision.

=== Ultimate Fighting Championship ===
In his promotional debut, Krause faced Sam Stout on June 15, 2013, at UFC 161, replacing an injured Isaac Vallie-Flagg. Krause won the back and forth bout, submitting Stout with a guillotine choke in the third round. His debut also earned Krause both Submission of the Night and Fight of the Night bonus awards.

Krause faced Bobby Green on November 6, 2013, at UFC Fight Night 31. The fight ended in unusual fashion as Green had previously kicked Krause in the groin area twice, resulting in a one-point deduction. Green then landed a blow on Krause's belt line, which resulted in Krause falling to the canvas. Referee John McCarthy declared it a legal blow and awarded Green a TKO victory.

Krause faced Jamie Varner on May 24, 2014, at UFC 173. Krause won the fight via TKO due to injury as Varner broke his ankle in the first round and was unable to continue into the second round.

Krause faced Jorge Masvidal on September 24, 2014, at UFC 178. He lost the fight via unanimous decision after being knocked down in the second round.

Krause faced Valmir Lázaro on February 28, 2015, at UFC 184. He lost the bout by split decision.

Krause faced Daron Cruickshank on July 25, 2015, at UFC on Fox 16. Krause won the fight by submission in the first round.

Krause faced Shane Campbell on February 21, 2016, at UFC Fight Night 83. He won the fight by unanimous decision.

Krause was expected to face Ross Pearson on July 8, 2016, at The Ultimate Fighter 23 Finale. However, Krause was pulled from the fight on June 13 for undisclosed reasons and replaced by Will Brooks.

The bout with Pearson was rescheduled and was expected to take place November 19, 2016, at UFC Fight Night 99. Subsequently on October 26, Krause pulled out of the fight citing a torn hamstring.

==== The Ultimate Fighter: Redemption ====
In February 2017, it was revealed that Krause - despite being an active UFC fighter - would compete on the UFC's reality show in the 25th season on The Ultimate Fighter: Redemption. Krause was the first pick overall for Team Dillashaw. He was initially scheduled to face Héctor Urbina on the first episode, but Urbina was unable to make weight and the bout was called off. Eventually in the third episode, Krause faced Johnny Nunez in the opening round and won via submission. He next faced Ramsey Nijem and won by unanimous decision. Krause faced Jesse Taylor in the semi-finals and lost via submission in the third round.

==== The Ultimate Fighter: Undefeated ====
On January 31, 2018, it was announced that Krause would join the coaches for Team Stipe in The Ultimate Fighter: Undefeated.

==== Return to the UFC ====
After his stint on The Ultimate Fighter: Redemption, Krause returned to the UFC to face fellow cast member Tom Gallicchio on July 7, 2017, at The Ultimate Fighter 25 Finale. He won the fight by unanimous decision.

Krause faced Alex White on January 14, 2018, at UFC Fight Night: Stephens vs. Choi. He won the fight by unanimous decision.

Krause faced Warlley Alves on August 25, 2018, at UFC Fight Night 135. He won the fight via technical knockout in the second round.

Krause faced Sérgio Moraes on November 16, 2019, at UFC Fight Night 164. He won the fight via knockout in round three. This win earned him the Performance of the Night award.

Krause faced Trevin Giles on a 1 day notice at middleweight, replacing Antônio Arroyo, on February 8, 2020, at UFC 247. Krause also signed a new, four-fight contract with the UFC pertaining to the last-minute replacement. Krause was applauded for taking the fight last minute. He lost the back-and-forth bout via split decision. The bout was also awarded the Fight of the Night bonus award. Later in the month, Krause with his management team informed intentions to appeal the outcome on grounds of possible conflict of interest: the only judge scoring the first round for Giles was a long time pupil of Giles' cornerman Joe Soliz.

Krause faced Cláudio Silva, replacing Muslim Salikhov, on October 18, 2020. at UFC Fight Night 180. He won the fight via unanimous decision.

In August 2022, during an interview on The MMA Hour, he announced that he had no interest in fighting in the future, effectively announcing his retirement from professional competition.

== Professional grappling career ==
Krause defeated Morgan Bracken by decision at Fight 2 Win 260 on September 21, 2024.

== Betting controversy ==
On November 5, 2022, controversy arose when the call for a sports betting fraud investigation was made on a fight involving Darrick Minner, one of Krause's students, and Shayilan Nuerdanbieke at UFC Fight Night: Rodriguez vs. Lemos. The UFC was informed by sources that suspicious betting patterns had been observed on the fight. Minner became a large betting underdog just hours before the fight, and the cause of the suspicion came when Minner threw a kick with an apparently injured leg, then kicked with it again after showing signs of injury before being finished by technical knockout shortly thereafter. On November 18, the Nevada State Athletic Commission informed the UFC and Krause that Krause’s license was suspended and would remain so during the course of the investigation. The UFC then announced that any fighter who chose to continue to be coached by Krause or who continued to train in his gym, would not be permitted to participate in UFC events pending the outcome of the aforementioned government investigations. Following the controversy UFC introduced rules that prevented athletes, coaches, and their close family from betting on UFC events.

Subsequently Krause opted to sell his gym – Glory MMA & Fitness – and its affiliates to the owner of the FAC MMA promotion Joe Wooster.

== Championships and awards ==
- Ultimate Fighting Championship
  - Fight of the Night (Two times) vs. Sam Stout and Trevin Giles
  - Performance of the Night (One time) vs. Sérgio Moraes
  - Submission of the Night (One time) vs. Sam Stout

== Mixed martial arts record ==
Professional record breakdown
36 matches	28 wins	8 losses
By knockout	8	1
By submission	14	2
By decision	6	5

Res.	Record	Opponent	Method	Event	Date	Round	Time	Location	Notes
Win	28–8	Cláudio Silva	Decision (unanimous)	UFC Fight Night: Ortega vs. The Korean Zombie	October 18, 2020	3	5:00	Abu Dhabi, United Arab Emirates	Return to Welterweight.
Loss	27–8	Trevin Giles	Decision (split)	UFC 247	February 8, 2020	3	5:00	Houston, Texas, United States	Middleweight debut. Fight of the Night.
Win	27–7	Sérgio Moraes	KO (punches)	UFC Fight Night: Błachowicz vs. Jacaré	November 16, 2019	3	4:19	São Paulo, Brazil	Performance of the Night.
Win	26–7	Warlley Alves	TKO (knee and punches)	UFC Fight Night: Gaethje vs. Vick	August 25, 2018	2	2:28	Lincoln, Nebraska, United States	Return to Welterweight.
Win	25–7	Alex White	Decision (unanimous)	UFC Fight Night: Stephens vs. Choi	January 14, 2018	3	5:00	St. Louis, Missouri, United States	
Win	24–7	Tom Gallicchio	Decision (unanimous)	The Ultimate Fighter: Redemption Finale	July 7, 2017	3	5:00	Las Vegas, Nevada, United States	Welterweight bout.
Win	23–7	Shane Campbell	Decision (unanimous)	UFC Fight Night: Cowboy vs. Cowboy	February 21, 2016	3	5:00	Pittsburgh, Pennsylvania, United States	
Win	22–7	Daron Cruickshank	Submission (rear-naked choke)	UFC on Fox: Dillashaw vs. Barão 2	July 25, 2015	1	1:27	Chicago, Illinois, United States	
Loss	21–7	Valmir Lázaro	Decision (split)	UFC 184	February 28, 2015	3	5:00	Los Angeles, California, United States	
Loss	21–6	Jorge Masvidal	Decision (unanimous)	UFC 178	September 27, 2014	3	5:00	Las Vegas, Nevada, United States	
Win	21–5	Jamie Varner	TKO (ankle injury)	UFC 173	May 24, 2014	1	5:00	Las Vegas, Nevada, United States	
Loss	20–5	Bobby Green	TKO (body kick)	UFC: Fight for the Troops 3	November 6, 2013	1	3:50	Fort Campbell, Kentucky, United States	
Win	20–4	Sam Stout	Submission (guillotine choke)	UFC 161	June 15, 2013	3	4:47	Winnipeg, Manitoba, Canada	Submission of the Night. Fight of the Night.
Win	19–4	Toby Imada	Decision (unanimous)	RFA 6	January 18, 2013	3	5:00	Kansas City, Missouri, United States	
Win	18–4	Joe Jordan	Submission (guillotine choke)	RFA 5	November 30, 2012	3	0:19	Kearney, Nebraska, United States	Welterweight bout.
Win	17–4	Guilherme Trindade	KO (punches)	RFA 4	November 2, 2012	1	0:31	Las Vegas, Nevada, United States	
Win	16–4	Amir Khillah	Decision (split)	RFA 3	June 30, 2012	3	5:00	Kearney, Nebraska, United States	Catchweight (165 lbs) bout.
Win	15–4	Mark Korzenowski	KO (head kick)	RFA 1	December 16, 2011	1	0:26	Kearney, Nebraska, United States	Welterweight bout.
Win	14–4	Sean Wilson	Submission (guillotine choke)	Titan FC 20	September 23, 2011	1	2:39	Kansas City, Kansas, United States	Catchweight (165 lbs) bout.
Win	13–4	Steve Schneider	Submission (rear-naked choke)	Shark Fights 19	September 10, 2011	2	2:46	Independence, Missouri, United States	Catchweight (164 lbs) bout.
Loss	12–4	Clay French	Decision (split)	Titan FC 19	July 29, 2011	3	5:00	Kansas City, Kansas, United States	Catchweight (160 lbs) bout.
Win	12–3	Nathan Schut	TKO (head kick and punches)	Titan FC 17	March 25, 2011	1	0:41	Kansas City, Kansas, United States	Catchweight (160 lbs) bout.
Loss	11–3	Toby Imada	Submission (armbar)	Bellator 14	April 15, 2010	2	2:44	Chicago, Illinois, United States	Lightweight Opening Tournament bout.
Win	11–2	Kalel Robinson	Submission (triangle choke)	Titan FC 15	December 18, 2009	2	2:28	Kansas City, Kansas, United States	
Loss	10–2	Ricardo Lamas	Decision (unanimous)	WEC 44	November 18, 2009	3	5:00	Las Vegas, Nevada, United States	
Loss	10–1	Donald Cerrone	Submission (rear-naked choke)	WEC 41	June 7, 2009	1	4:38	Sacramento, California, United States	
Win	10–0	Matt Williamson	KO (head kick)	Close Quarters Combat	March 21, 2009	1	1:15	Kansas City, Missouri, United States	
Win	9–0	Steve Schnieder	Submission (triangle choke)	Titan FC 12	December 19, 2008	1	1:10	Kansas City, Missouri, United States	
Win	8–0	Michael Johnson	Submission (triangle choke)	FM: Productions	November 22, 2008	1	2:55	Springfield, Missouri, United States	
Win	7–0	Tim Bazer	Submission (triangle choke)	IFC: Sturgis 2008	August 6, 2008	1	4:30	Sturgis, South Dakota, United States	
Win	6–0	Ran Weathers	Submission (triangle choke)	IFC: Sturgis 2008	August 6, 2008	1	1:36	Sturgis, South Dakota, United States	
Win	5–0	Dan Copp	Submission (rear-naked choke)	IFC: Sturgis 2008	August 6, 2008	1	1:55	Sturgis, South Dakota, United States	
Win	4–0	Douglas Edwards	Submission (choke)	World Cage FC 2	June 28, 2008	1	1:36	Independence, Missouri, United States	
Win	3–0	Shane Hutchison	TKO (punches)	World Cage FC 1	April 5, 2008	1	0:34	Independence, Missouri, United States	
Win	2–0	Anthony Smith	Submission (choke)	True Fight Fans 1	December 7, 2007	1	2:30	Grain Valley, Missouri, United States	
Win	1–0	Kevin Hengler	Technical Submission (choke)	Titan FC 10	November 28, 2007	1	N/A	Kansas City, Missouri, United States	

=== Mixed martial arts exhibition record ===
Exhibition record breakdown		
4 matches	2 wins	2 losses
By knockout	0	1
By submission	1	0
By decision	1	1

Res.	Record	Opponent	Method	Event	Date	Round	Time	Location	Notes
Loss	2–2	Jesse Taylor	Technical Submission (guillotine choke)	The Ultimate Fighter: Redemption	July 5, 2017 (airdate)	3	2:32	Las Vegas, Nevada, United States	Semi-finals.
Win	2–1	Ramsey Nijem	Decision (unanimous)	The Ultimate Fighter: Redemption	June 21, 2017 (airdate)	3	5:00	Las Vegas, Nevada, United States	The Ultimate Fighter 25 Quarterfinal Round.
Win	1–1	Johnny Nunez	Submission (rear-naked choke)	The Ultimate Fighter: Redemption	May 10, 2017 (airdate)	1	4:45	Las Vegas, Nevada, United States	The Ultimate Fighter 25 Preliminary Round.
Loss	0–1	Justin Lawrence	TKO (punches)	The Ultimate Fighter: Live	March 9, 2012 (airdate)	1	1:25	Las Vegas, Nevada, United States	The Ultimate Fighter: Live Elimination round.

== See also ==
- List of male mixed martial artists
