= Deer Valley High School (Arizona) =

High school in Glendale, Arizona

Coordinates: 33°39′9.62″N 112°10′19.86″W

- 18424 N 51st Ave. Glendale, Arizona; United States of America

Information
- Type: Public
- Established: 1980; 46 years ago
- School district: Deer Valley Unified School District
- Principal: Paul Roskelley
- Teaching staff: 139.60 (FTE)
- Grades: 9-12
- Student to teacher ratio: 12.15
- Colors: white, silver, and Columbia blue
- Mascot: Skyhawk
- Newspaper: Skyhawk Flight
- Website: dvhs.dvusd.org

Deer Valley High School is a public high school located in Glendale, Arizona, part of the Deer Valley Unified School District. The school opened its doors in 1980 with an initial enrollment of 750 students. Today, the campus is housed on more than 60 acres (240,000 m^{2}) with a current enrollment of about 1,900 students.

== History ==
The 2011 renovation was the first major renovation to the school since its 1980 construction.

== Governance ==
The school is run by over 100 teachers, five counselors, one psychologist, four administrators, and numerous other support staff with Paul Roskelly as the current principal

== Extracurricular activities ==
=== Athletics ===
Deer Valley High School offers all Arizona Interscholastic Association-sanctioned sports as of the 2011-2012 school year (with the addition of badminton across the district). Since 1985, the school has won 12 state titles: three in softball; two in girls' cross country; and one each in boys' track and field, boys' tennis, baseball, boys' volleyball, girls' basketball, girls' track and field, and boys’ basketball in the 2023-2024 season.

=== Fall sports ===
- Cross country
- Football
- Golf
- Cheerleading
- Swimming and diving
- Volleyball (girls')
- Badminton

=== Winter sports ===
- Basketball (boys')
- Basketball (girls')
- Soccer (boys')
- Soccer (girls')
- Wrestling

=== Spring sports ===
- Baseball
- Softball
- Tennis
- Track and field
- Volleyball (boys')

=== Band ===
The current band program offers three concert bands (Wind Ensemble, Symphonic Winds and Symphonic Band), (formally) three jazz bands (Performance Jazz Ensemble, Advanced Jazz Ensemble and Jazz Ensemble), several Jazz Combos, Marching Band, Orchestra, Percussion and Colorguard.

The Deer Valley Performance Jazz Ensemble was selected to perform at the 60th Annual Midwest Clinic in 2006. The Performance Jazz Ensemble has won three national contests (2002 and 2006 Conn-Selmer Big Bad Voodoo Daddy Jazz Contest, and the 2006 Music and Arts Spring Swing Competition), has been national runners-up twice (2003 and 2004, Conn-Selmer Big Bad Voodoo Daddy Jazz Contest), and was featured at the 2005, 2006, and 2008 Arizona Music Educator's Conference.

The Marching Band has performed in the Macy's Thanksgiving Day Parade (1994), the Tournament of Roses Parade (1994), and the Fiesta Bowl National Pageant of Bands.

The 2006-2007 Marching Band received a rating of Superior with Distinction at the 2006 State Marching Festival. The Performance Jazz Ensemble was invited to perform at the 2007 Western International Band Clinic in Seattle.

On October 20, 2007, the Marching Band received the Rating of Superior at the Arizona State University Band Day, as well as awards for Outstanding Music, Visual, GE and Auxiliary.

The Deer Valley Skyhawk Marching Band won the 2014 Division II AZ State Championships with a performance score of 85.

== Notable alumni ==
- Paul Boyer, member of Arizona House of Representatives
- Khristopher Davis, Major League Baseball player
- Lauren Haeger, Professional Softball Player. 2011 State Champion; 2x Women’s College World Series Champion at University of Florida; nominated for ESPY in 2015
- Bob Howry, former MLB player (Chicago White Sox, Boston Red Sox, Cleveland Indians, Chicago Cubs, Arizona Diamondbacks and San Francisco Giants)
- Michael McDowell, current NASCAR Cup Series driver for Front Row Motorsports and 2021 Daytona 500 champion.
- Ty Murray, professional bull rider; married to Jewel 2008–2014
- Nate Ruess, lead singer of The Format and Fun.
- Jamie Varner, state runner-up wrestler; retired professional mixed martial artist; former World Extreme Cagefighting (WEC) Lightweight Champion; competed for the Ultimate Fighting Championship (UFC)
