= Wagnney Fabiano =

Brazilian mixed martial artist

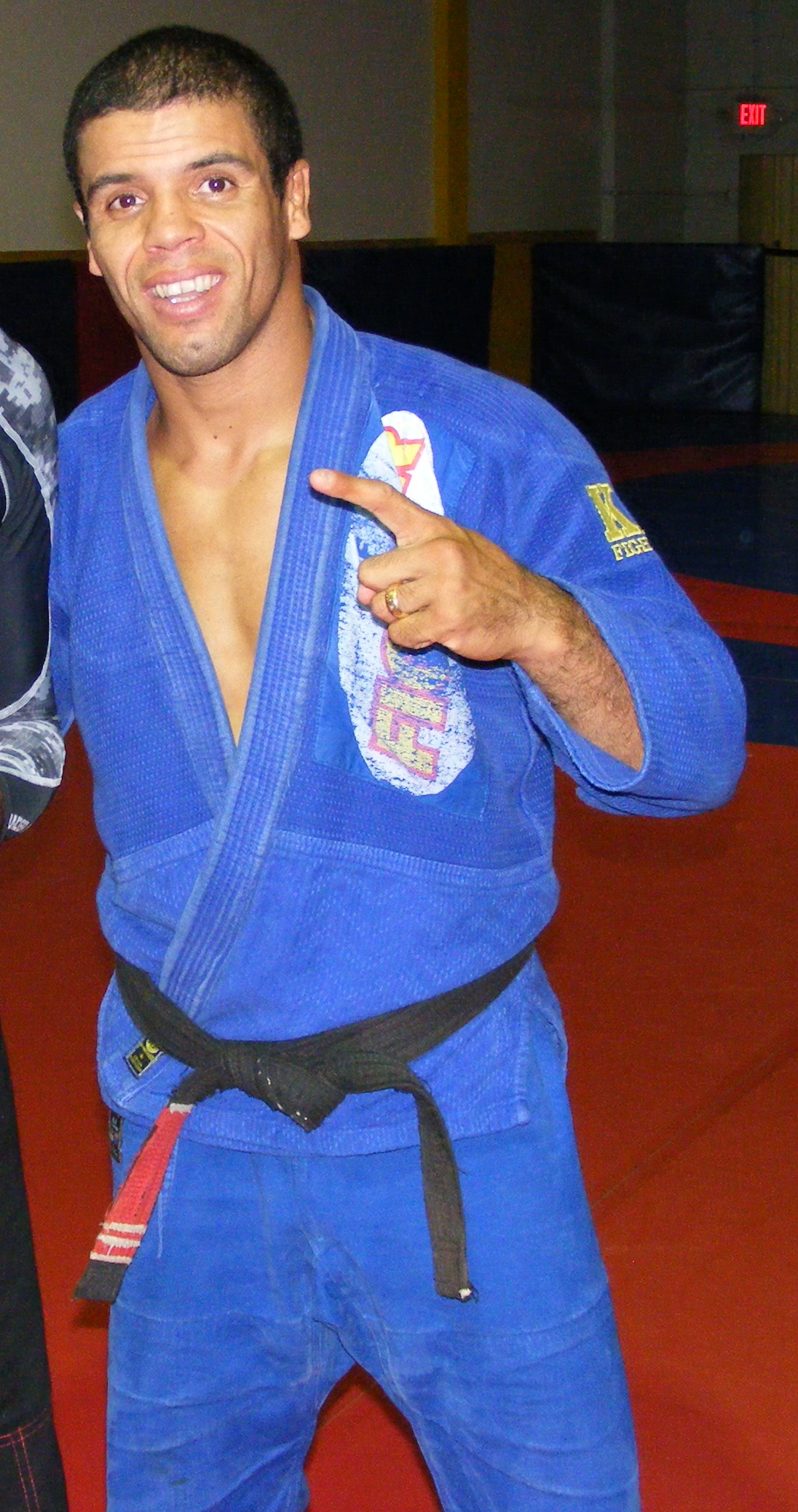
- Born: Wagnney Silva Fabiano-Santos; Rio de Janeiro, Brazil
- Other names: The Silencer
- Nationality: Brazilian; Canadian
- Height: 5 ft 8 in (1.73 m)
- Weight: 160 lb (73 kg; 11 st)
- Division: Featherweight (2006-2009, 2012-present); Bantamweight (2010); Lightweight (2002-2004)
- Reach: 69 in (180 cm)
- Fighting out of: Toronto, Ontario, Canada
- Team: Nova União
- Rank: 5th degree black belt in Brazilian Jiu-Jitsu
- Years active: 2000-present

Mixed martial arts record
- Total: 20
- Wins: 16
- By knockout: 2
- By submission: 9
- By decision: 5
- Losses: 4
- By submission: 2
- By decision: 2

Other information
- Mixed martial arts record from Sherdog

Wagnney Silva Fabiano-Santos is a Brazilian mixed martial artist. He is best known for fighting in the WEC, as well as for the Toronto Dragons of the International Fight League and is the former IFL Featherweight Champion.

== Background ==
Wagnney has trained in Brazil with teammates under Antônio Rodrigo Nogueira and is also linked to Renzo Gracie's Academy. In addition, he has coached Georges St-Pierre in Brazilian Jiu Jitsu.

=== APEX ===
On October 14, 2006, Fabiano stepped in to face off against Jeff Curran. Both fighters seemed overly tentative on the feet, and the fight largely consisted of grappling. Fabiano landed a few takedowns but offered little offence on the ground, being unable to improve his position. Curran came out firing in the third as he landed some good shots before they hit the canvas again. Even with Curran's third round, it appeared Fabiano would be ahead on takedowns on the scorecards. However the decision was announced, contentiously, in favor of Jeff Curran by split decision.

=== International Fight League ===
After losing for the first time in his career via controversial split decision to Jeff Curran, Fabiano ventured into the International Fight League. In his career there, he enjoyed four straight wins showcasing notable submission offence by ending each fight via submission in the first round. He then fought LC Davis and became IFL Featherweight Champion with a submission victory by armbar near the close of the first round. This was after dropping down to 145-pounds after defeating John Gunderson at 155-pounds in his previous IFL World Grand Prix fight. The victory over Gunderson was supposed to set up Fabiano for a match with the previously unbeaten Chris Horodecki, but Fabiano dropped down to 145-pounds in order to fight for the Featherweight Championship.

Wagnney Fabiano's next bout, and first IFL Featherweight title defense, came against Shad Lierley on April 4, 2008 at; IFL - New Blood, New Battles 2. In what was dubbed as an archetypal fight between wrestler and Brazilian jiu-jitsu expert, Fabiano won by knocking out Lierly at 0:37 of the first round. Fabiano displayed impressive standup skills, utilizing good leg kicks and bodyshots. Near the end of the round he threw a left jab which Lierly parried partially, but connected a flush right hook to knock out the challenger convincingly and conclude his first title defence. It also become his last and only defence of the IFL Featherweight championship as the company ceased operations on July 31, 2008.

=== World Extreme Cagefighting ===
On August 22 of 2008, the WEC announced that it had signed Fabiano. He was the last remaining champion from the International Fight League.

Fabiano was scheduled to fight undefeated WEC newcomer Erik Koch on October 10, 2009 at WEC 43., but Koch was forced to withdraw due to an undisclosed injury while training, he was replaced by Mackens Semerzier. Fabiano was defeated by Semerzier by submission via triangle choke in the first round, ending his eight-fight win streak. Fabiano found himself on the wrong end of the Sherdog.com Upset of the Year as a result of that submission loss.

Fabiano was expected to face Frank Gomez on January 10, 2010 at WEC 46. However, Gomez had been forced out of the bout with an injury. Fabiano instead faced Clint Godfrey, winning his bantamweight debut via unanimous decision.

Fabiano/Gomez eventually took place on June 20, 2010 at WEC 49. Fabiano won the fight via unanimous decision.

Fabiano was expected to face former WEC Bantamweight Champion Brian Bowles at WEC 52. However, Bowles was forced off the card with an injury, and replaced by Joseph Benavidez. Fabiano was defeated by Benavidez via second round submission.

Despite going 4-2 in the WEC, Fabiano was cut by Zuffa after his WEC 52 loss and the WEC/UFC merger. Following his release, Fabiano tried out for The Ultimate Fighter 14 at the open tryouts in Newark, N.J. on March 21, 2011.

=== Bellator MMA ===
After almost 2 years away from the sport, Fabiano returned to MMA to compete in the Bellator Season Seven Featherweight tournament, He faced Akop Stepanyan in the Quarterfinals at Bellator 76 and won the bout via first round armbar submission.

On November 9, 2012 Fabiano took on Rad Martinez at Bellator 80 in the Semifinals losing via unanimous decision.

== Personal life ==
Wagnney Fabiano is married to Rachel Alves Romero dos Santos since 1998 and the couple has two daughters and a son. The oldest, Joy Melody Romero dos Santos, Faith Melody Romero dos Santos, and the youngest Brave Sage Romero dos Santos.

== Championships and accomplishments ==
- International Fight League
  - IFL Featherweight Championship (One time; First; Last)
  - IFL 2007 Featherweight Grand Prix Champion
- TKO Major League MMA
  - UCC/TKO World Super-Lightweight Championship (One time)

== Mixed martial arts record ==
Professional record breakdown
20 matches	16 wins	4 losses
By knockout	2	0
By submission	9	2
By decision	5	2

Res.	Record	Opponent	Method	Event	Date	Round	Time	Location	Notes
Win	16–4	Edinelson Cordeiro	Submission (armbar)	Shooto Brazil 52	December 21, 2014	1	3:50	Rio de Janeiro, Brazil	
Loss	15–4	Rad Martinez	Decision (unanimous)	Bellator 80	November 9, 2012	3	5:00	Hollywood, Florida, United States	Bellator Season 7 Featherweight Tournament Semifinal
Win	15–3	Akop Stepanyan	Submission (armbar)	Bellator 76	October 12, 2012	1	3:24	Windsor, Ontario, Canada	Bellator Season 7 Featherweight Tournament Quarterfinal
Loss	14–3	Joseph Benavidez	Submission (guillotine choke)	WEC 52	November 11, 2010	2	2:45	Las Vegas, Nevada, United States	
Win	14–2	Frank Gomez	Decision (unanimous)	WEC 49	June 20, 2010	3	5:00	Edmonton, Alberta, Canada	
Win	13–2	Clint Godfrey	Decision (unanimous)	WEC 46	January 10, 2010	3	5:00	Sacramento, California, United States	Bantamweight debut
Loss	12–2	Mackens Semerzier	Submission (triangle choke)	WEC 43	October 10, 2009	1	2:14	San Antonio, Texas, United States	2010 Sherdog upset of the year
Win	12–1	Fredson Paixão	Decision (unanimous)	WEC 40	April 5, 2009	3	5:00	Chicago, Illinois, United States	
Win	11–1	Akitoshi Tamura	Submission (arm-triangle choke)	WEC 37: Torres vs. Tapia	December 3, 2008	3	4:48	Las Vegas, Nevada, United States	
Win	10–1	Shad Lierley	KO (punch)	IFL: New Blood, New Battles 2	April 4, 2008	1	0:37	East Rutherford, New Jersey, United States	Defended the IFL Featherweight Championship.
Win	9–1	LC Davis	Submission (armbar)	IFL - World Grand Prix Finals	December 29, 2007	1	3:38	Uncasville, Connecticut, United States	Won the inaugural IFL Featherweight Championship.
Win	8–1	John Gunderson	Submission (guillotine choke)	IFL - World Grand Prix Semifinals	November 3, 2007	2	1:53	Chicago, Illinois, United States	
Win	7–1	Erik Owings	Submission (armbar)	IFL - Las Vegas	June 16, 2007	1	0:58	Las Vegas, Nevada, United States	
Win	6–1	Cam Ward	Submission (arm-triangle choke)	IFL - Connecticut	April 13, 2007	1	3:24	Uncasville, Connecticut, United States	
Win	5–1	Ian Loveland	Submission (arm-triangle choke)	IFL - Atlanta	February 23, 2007	1	0:59	Atlanta, Georgia, United States	
Loss	4–1	Jeff Curran	Decision (split)	APEX: A Night Of Champions	October 14, 2006	3	5:00	Gatineau, Quebec, Canada	
Win	4–0	Bao Quach	KO (head kick)	APEX: Evolution	June 10, 2006	1	4:50	Gatineau, Quebec, Canada	
Win	3–0	Matt Fiordirosa	Decision (unanimous)	Freedom Fights: Canada vs. USA	January 14, 2006	3	5:00	Hull, Quebec, Canada	
Win	2–0	Tommy Lee	Submission (arm-triangle choke)	TKO 16: Infernal	May 22, 2004	1	2:46	Quebec City, Quebec, Canada	Won TKO World Super-Lightweight Championship
Win	1–0	Ali Nestor Charles	Decision (unanimous)	UCC 1: The New Beginning	June 2, 2002	2	10:00	Montreal, Quebec, Canada	Won UCC Lightweight MMA World Championship

== Awards ==
- fifth-Degree Black Belt in Brazilian Jiu Jitsu under Wendell Alexander and André Pederneiras.
- Has also trained in Brazilian Jiu Jitsu under Renzo Gracie and Carlos Gracie (Jr.).
- Member of 1997 BJJ World Champions team Nova Uniao.
- Won five (5) state titles.
- Three-time Brazilian National Champion.
- Brazilian National Teams Champion.
- Won Pan-Am '95.
- Third Place in the world in Mundials '98.
- 2004 Arnold Gracie Worlds Pro Division 2nd Place.
- 2005 ADCC Quarter Finalist.
- Won the NAGA, Grapplers Quest, and the Brazilian Abu Dhabi trials.

New championship	1st IFL Featherweight Champion; December 29, 2007 - July 31, 2008	Succeeded by IFL ceased operations
