= Dave Jansen =

American mixed martial arts fighter

- Born: David Hendrik Jansen; August 21, 1979 (age 47); Portland, Oregon, United States
- Other names: The Fugitive
- Height: 5 ft 9 in (1.75 m)
- Weight: 155 lb (70 kg; 11.1 st)
- Division: Lightweight
- Reach: 73 in (185 cm)
- Fighting out of: Portland, Oregon, United States
- Team: Rose City Fitness Center

Mixed martial arts record
- Total: 24
- Wins: 20
- By knockout: 1
- By submission: 10
- By decision: 9
- Losses: 4
- By decision: 4

Other information
- Mixed martial arts record from Sherdog

David Hendrik Jansen (born August 21, 1979) is an American mixed martial artist who formerly competed in Bellator's Lightweight division. A professional competitor since 2007, Jansen has also formerly competed for the WEC and M-1 Global.

== Background ==
Born and raised in Portland, Oregon, Jansen competed in high school wrestling. Jansen won a state championship in 1997, and also finished third twice. Jansen received a full scholarship to continue wrestling at the University of Oregon but only spent two years in college, having become "burned out" with wrestling. Jansen later joined Team Quest and transitioned into mixed martial arts.

== Mixed martial arts career ==
=== Early career ===
Jansen held an undefeated amateur record of 6–0 before making his professional debut in September 2007, compiling a professional record of 12–0 with three appearances for the M-1 Global promotion before being signed by the WEC.

=== World Extreme Cagefighting ===
Jansen defeated Richard Crunkilton via unanimous decision in his WEC debut at WEC 43 on October 10, 2009.

Jansen suffered his first professional loss against Kamal Shalorus on January 10, 2010, at WEC 46.

Jansen next fought Ricardo Lamas on August 18, 2010, at WEC 50. He lost the fight via unanimous decision.

After his consecutive losses in the WEC, Jansen was released from the promotion.

=== Bellator Fighting Championships ===
Jansen made his Bellator debut at Bellator 39, defeating Scott McAfee by first-round submission.

Jansen next defeated Ashkan Morvari via rear-naked choke submission in the second round at Bellator 57.

Jansen won his third straight Bellator fight when he defeated Jacob Kirwan via unanimous decision at Bellator 62.

Jansen faced Magomed Saadulaev in the quarterfinal round of the Bellator Lightweight Tournament on October 19, 2012, at Bellator LXXVII. He won the fight via guillotine choke in the third round. He faced Ricardo Tirloni in the semifinals on November 16, 2012, at Bellator 81. Jansen won via split decision to advance to the finals of the Bellator Lightweight Tournament.

Jansen was expected to face Marcin Held for the Season Seven Tournament Final at Bellator 84 but Held was not allowed in the Horseshoe casino, in Hammond, Indiana, where the event was being held since he was only 20 years old, and therefore the fight has been pushed to sometime during Bellator Fighting Championships: Season Eight.

The bout with Held was rescheduled for March 7, 2013, at Bellator 92. Jansen won the fight via unanimous decision to earn a Lightweight title shot.

Jansen was scheduled to face champion Michael Chandler for the title at Bellator 96 on June 19, 2013. However, on June 2, it was announced that Jansen had to pull out of the bout due to an injury.

After a long layoff from the Bellator cage, Jansen returned against Rick Hawn on October 24, 2014, at Bellator 130. He won via unanimous decision.

Jansen challenged Will Brooks for the Bellator Lightweight Championship on April 10, 2015, at Bellator 136. He lost the fight by unanimous decision.

A rematch with Marcin Held took place on May 20, 2016, at Bellator 155. He lost the fight via unanimous decision.

After two straight losses, Jansen was released from the promotion.

== Personal life ==
In 2007, Jansen's father died due to a car accident.

== Championships and accomplishments ==
- Bellator MMA
  - Bellator Season 2 Lightweight Tournament Winner

== Mixed martial arts record ==
Professional record breakdown
| 24 matches | 20 wins | 4 losses |
| By knockout | 1 | 0 |
| By submission | 10 | 0 |
| By decision | 9 | 4 |

| Res. | Record | Opponent | Method | Event | Date | Round | Time | Location | Notes |
|---|---|---|---|---|---|---|---|---|---|
| Loss | 20–4 | Marcin Held | Decision (unanimous) | Bellator 155 | May 20, 2016 | 3 | 5:00 | Boise, Idaho, United States | |
| Loss | 20–3 | Will Brooks | Decision (unanimous) | Bellator 136 | April 10, 2015 | 5 | 5:00 | Irvine, California, United States | For the Bellator Lightweight Championship |
| Win | 20–2 | Rick Hawn | Decision (unanimous) | Bellator 130 | October 24, 2014 | 3 | 5:00 | Mulvane, Kansas, United States | |
| Win | 19–2 | Marcin Held | Decision (unanimous) | Bellator 93 | March 21, 2013 | 3 | 5:00 | Lewiston, Maine, United States | Bellator Season Seven Lightweight Tournament Final. |
| Win | 18–2 | Ricardo Tirloni | Decision (split) | Bellator 81 | November 16, 2012 | 3 | 5:00 | Kingston, Rhode Island, United States | Bellator Season Seven Lightweight Tournament Semifinal. |
| Win | 17–2 | Magomed Saadulaev | Submission (guillotine choke) | Bellator 77 | October 19, 2012 | 3 | 0:41 | Reading, Pennsylvania, United States | Bellator Season Seven Lightweight Tournament Quarterfinal. |
| Win | 16–2 | Jacob Kirwan | Decision (unanimous) | Bellator 62 | March 23, 2012 | 3 | 5:00 | Laredo, Texas, United States | |
| Win | 15–2 | Ashkan Morvari | Submission (rear-naked choke) | Bellator 57 | November 12, 2011 | 2 | 2:47 | Rama, Ontario, Canada | |
| Win | 14–2 | Scott McAfee | Submission (d'arce choke) | Bellator 39 | April 2, 2011 | 1 | 4:58 | Uncasville, Connecticut, United States | |
| Loss | 13–2 | Ricardo Lamas | Decision (unanimous) | WEC 50 | August 18, 2010 | 3 | 5:00 | Las Vegas, Nevada, United States | |
| Loss | 13–1 | Kamal Shalorus | Decision (unanimous) | WEC 46 | January 10, 2010 | 3 | 5:00 | Sacramento, California, United States | |
| Win | 13–0 | Richard Crunkilton | Decision (unanimous) | WEC 43 | October 10, 2009 | 3 | 5:00 | San Antonio, Texas, United States | |
| Win | 12–0 | Amirkhan Mazihov | Submission (guillotine choke) | M-1 Challenge 17: Korea | July 4, 2009 | 1 | 0:22 | Seoul, South Korea | |
| Win | 11–0 | Yui Chul Nam | Decision (unanimous) | M-1 Challenge 14: Japan | April 29, 2009 | 2 | 5:00 | Tokyo, Japan | |
| Win | 10–0 | Flavio Alvaro | Decision (unanimous) | M-1 Challenge 12: USA | February 21, 2009 | 2 | 5:00 | Tacoma, Washington, United States | |
| Win | 9–0 | Matt Lee | Submission (anaconda choke) | World Cagefighting Alliance: Pure Combat | February 6, 2009 | 1 | 3:00 | Atlantic City, New Jersey, United States | |
| Win | 8–0 | Corey Mahon | Submission (rear-naked choke) | District Combat Promotions: Battle at the Nation's Capital | December 13, 2008 | 1 | 0:52 | Washington, D.C., United States | |
| Win | 7–0 | Sterling Ford | Decision (unanimous) | Sportfight 24: Domination | September 19, 2008 | 3 | 5:00 | Portland, Oregon, United States | |
| Win | 6–0 | Bobby Corpuz | Submission (rear-naked choke) | Elite Warriors Championships | August 2, 2006 | 2 | 2:38 | Salem, Oregon, United States | |
| Win | 5–0 | Dennis Davis | Decision (unanimous) | Banner Promotions: Night of Combat | June 20, 2008 | 3 | 5:00 | Las Vegas, Nevada, United States | |
| Win | 4–0 | Tommy Truex | TKO (punches) | SportFight22: Re-Awakening | April 18, 2008 | 1 | 1:38 | Portland, Oregon, United States | |
| Win | 3–0 | Jeremy Burnett | Submission (anaconda choke) | Sport Fight 21: Seasons Beatings | December 22, 2007 | 1 | 0:41 | Portland, Oregon, United States | |
| Win | 2–0 | Dennis Parks | Submission (guillotine choke) | SF 20: Homecoming | October 27, 2007 | 1 | N/A | Portland, Oregon, United States | |
| Win | 1–0 | Alejandro Alvarez | Submission (anaconda choke) | FCFF: Rumble at the Roseland 30 | September 22, 2007 | 1 | 2:42 | Portland, Oregon, United States | |
