= Frank Gomez =

American mixed martial arts fighter

- Born: March 31, 1986 (age 40); Nevada, United States
- Height: 5 ft 10 in (1.78 m)
- Weight: 135 lb (61 kg; 9.6 st)
- Division: Bantamweight
- Reach: 69 in (180 cm)
- Fighting out of: Albuquerque, New Mexico, U.S.

Mixed martial arts record
- Total: 16
- Wins: 10
- By knockout: 5
- By submission: 3
- By decision: 2
- Losses: 6
- By knockout: 2
- By submission: 3
- By decision: 1
- Draws: 0
- No contests: 0

Other information
- Mixed martial arts record from Sherdog

Frank Gomez (born March 31, 1986) is an American mixed martial artist. He formerly fought in the WEC's bantamweight division. Gomez is from Albuquerque, New Mexico where he trains full-time with Jackson's Submission Fighting. He got into MMA from wrestling at San Francisco State College where he met up with Gilbert Melendez and Jake Shields.

== Mixed martial arts career ==
=== World Extreme Cagefighting ===
Gomez faced Scott Jorgensen at WEC 38 on January 25, 2009. He lost the fight via guillotine choke, the first loss of his career. Gomez then defeated Seth Dikun on November 18, 2009 at WEC 44.

Gomez was expected to face Wagnney Fabiano on January 10, 2010 at WEC 46, but was forced off the card with an injury, and was replaced by WEC newcomer Clint Godfrey.

The fight with Fabiano eventually took place on June 20, 2010 at WEC 49; Gomez lost the fight via unanimous decision.

=== Post-WEC career ===
Following his release from WEC, Gomez debuted in the Shark Fights promotion, facing Timothy Snyder at Shark Fights 15: Villaseñor vs Camozzi on May 27, 2011. He won the fight via rear-naked choke.

== Mixed martial arts record ==
Professional record breakdown
16 matches	10 wins	6 losses
By knockout	5	2
By submission	3	3
By decision	2	1

Res.	Record	Opponent	Method	Event	Date	Round	Time	Location	Notes
Loss	10–6	Aaron Cerda	TKO (eye injury)	JMMAS 9	September 8, 2012	1	4:26	Albuquerque, New Mexico, United States	
Loss	10–5	Chris Gruetzemacher	TKO (punches)	WMMA 1	March 31, 2012	1	3:25	El Paso, Texas, United States	
Loss	10–4	Daniel Pineda	Submission (rear-naked choke)	Legacy FC 7: Prater vs. Dollar	July 22, 2011	3	2:55	Houston, Texas, United States	
Win	10–3	Timothy Snyder	Submission (rear-naked choke)	Shark Fights 15: Villaseñor vs Camozzi	May 27, 2011	1	3:19	Rio Rancho, New Mexico, United States	
Win	9–3	Alfredo Herrea	TKO (punches)	Mescalero Warrior Challenge	February 26, 2011	1	1:45	Mescalero, New Mexico, United States	
Loss	8–3	Johnny Bedford	Submission (rear-naked choke)	Jackson's MMA Series 3	December 18, 2010	1	1:34	Albuquerque, New Mexico, United States	
Loss	8–2	Wagnney Fabiano	Decision (unanimous)	WEC 49	June 20, 2010	3	5:00	Edmonton, Alberta, Canada	
Win	8–1	Seth Dikun	Decision (unanimous)	WEC 44	November 18, 2009	3	5:00	Las Vegas, Nevada, United States	
Win	7–1	Noah Thomas	Submission (arm triangle choke)	WEC 41	June 7, 2009	2	3:12	Sacramento, California, United States	
Loss	6–1	Scott Jorgensen	Submission (guillotine choke)	WEC 38	January 25, 2009	1	1:09	San Diego, California, United States	WEC debut.
Win	6–0	Matt Ott	TKO (punches)	WP - Warpath	September 27, 2008	1	1:42	Albuquerque, New Mexico, United States	
Win	5–0	Eddie Armendariz	TKO	SCA - Duke City Brawl 2	May 17, 2008	1		New Mexico, United States	
Win	4–0	Andy Miranda	Submission (rear naked choke)	CCFC - Total Elimination	May 12, 2007	2		Santa Rosa, California, United States	
Win	3–0	Brandon Jinnies	Decision	GKO 2 - Global Knockout 2	March 22, 2007	3	5:00	Jackson, California, United States	
Win	2–0	Chris Duenas	TKO (punches)	PXC 10 - Final Redemption	January 27, 2007	1		Mangilao, Guam	
Win	1–0	Elbert Randle	TKO	GKO 1 - Global Knockout 1	October 26, 2006	2		Jackson, California, United States	
