= WEC 49 =

World Extreme Cagefighting mixed martial arts eventevent in 2010

WEC 49: Varner vs. Shalorus
- The poster for WEC 49: Varner vs. Shalorus
- Promotion: World Extreme Cagefighting
- Date: June 20, 2010
- Venue: Rexall Place
- City: Edmonton, Alberta, Canada
- Attendance: 5,600
- Total gate: $332,000

Event chronology
WEC 48: Aldo vs. Faber	WEC 49: Varner vs. Shalorus	WEC 50: Cruz vs. Benavidez 2

WEC 49: Varner vs. Shalorus was a mixed martial arts event held by World Extreme Cagefighting that took place on June 20, 2010 at Rexall Place in Edmonton, Alberta, Canada.

== Background ==
WEC 49 was the only event the organization had held outside of the United States. The show was initially announced as taking place at the Stampede Corral in Calgary, Alberta, Canada. WEC vice-president Peter Dropick, however, confirmed with The StarPhoenix/Canwest News Service that the location was changed on April 10.

Eddie Wineland was scheduled to face Charlie Valencia, but Valencia was forced off the card with an injury. Will Campuzano, who was previously scheduled to face Rafael Rebello on the preliminary card, was announced as Wineland's new opponent. Rebello would face WEC newcomer Chris Cariaso.

Ed Ratcliff was scheduled to face Chris Horodecki, but just days before the event, Ratcliff pulled out of the event with an undisclosed injury. Horodecki would face WEC newcomer Danny Downes. The Horodecki/Ratcliff fight was rescheduled for WEC 51, where Horodecki won via split decision.

After WEC ring announcer Joe Martinez resigned to work for Golden Boy Promotions, fellow Zuffa-owned promotion UFC announcer Bruce Buffer agreed to handle fighter introductions for WEC 49. Kenny Florian would provide color commentary for the event, as he did at WEC 41 alongside play-by-play announcer Todd Harris.

Renan Barão vs. Anthony Leone was originally scheduled to be a bantamweight bout, but changed to a 142lb catchweight bout when Leone (a natural Featherweight) refused to drop to Bantamweight.

The event drew an average of 244,000 viewers, with a peak at 324,000 viewers on Versus.

== Results ==
Main card
Weight class				Method	Round	Time	Notes
Lightweight	Jamie Varner	vs.	Kamal Shalorus	Draw (split) (29-27, 27-29, 28-28)	3	5:00	(Note: Shalorus had one point deducted in round 2 for a kick to the groin.)
Featherweight	Josh Grispi	def	LC Davis	Technical Submission (guillotine choke)	1	2:33
Featherweight	Mark Hominick	def	Yves Jabouin	TKO (punches)	2	3:21
Lightweight	Chris Horodecki	def	Danny Downes	Submission (rear-naked choke)	3	1:09
Bantamweight	Eddie Wineland	def	Will Campuzano	TKO (punches)	2	4:44
Preliminary card
Lightweight	Will Kerr	def	Karen Darabedyan	Submission (armbar)	1	1:20	(Note: This bout was aired on the live broadcast.)
Featherweight	Wagnney Fabiano	def	Frank Gomez	Decision (unanimous) (30–27, 30–27, 30–27)	3	5:00
Featherweight	Erik Koch	def	Bendy Casimir	Submission (triangle choke)	1	3:01	(Note: This bout was aired on the live broadcast.)
Featherweight	Diego Nunes	def	Raphael Assunção	Decision (split) (30–27, 28–29, 29–28)	3	5:00
Bantamweight	Chris Cariaso	def	Rafael Rebello	Decision (unanimous) (29-28, 29-28, 30-26)	3	5:00
Catchweight (142 lb)	Renan Barão	def	Anthony Leone	Submission (armbar)	3	2:29

== Bonus Awards ==
Fighters were awarded $10,000 bonuses.

- Fight of the Night: (Canada) Mark Hominick vs. (Haiti) Yves Jabouin
- Knockout of the Night: (United States) Eddie Wineland
- Submission of the Night: (United States) Josh Grispi

== See also ==
- World Extreme Cagefighting
- List of World Extreme Cagefighting champions
- List of WEC events
- 2010 in WEC
