= Jamie Varner =

American mixed martial arts fighter

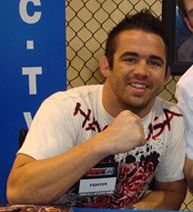
- Varner in 2010
- Born: October 12, 1984 (age 42); Phoenix, Arizona, U.S.
- Other names: C-4
- Height: 5 ft 8 in (1.73 m)
- Weight: 156 lb (71 kg; 11.1 st)
- Division: Lightweight; Welterweight
- Reach: 72 in (180 cm)
- Fighting out of: Glendale, Arizona, U.S.
- Team: Arizona Combat Sports; MMA Lab
- Rank: Brown belt in Brazilian jiu-jitsu under Gustavo Dantas
- Years active: 2003–2014

Mixed martial arts record
- Total: 35
- Wins: 21
- By knockout: 7
- By submission: 11
- By decision: 3
- Losses: 11
- By knockout: 2
- By submission: 5
- By decision: 4
- Draws: 1
- No contests: 2

Other information
- University: Lock Haven University
- Notable school: Deer Valley High School
- Mixed martial arts record from Sherdog
- Last updated on: September 09, 2009

James Varner (born October 12, 1984) is a retired American mixed martial artist who fought in the Ultimate Fighting Championship (UFC) and the World Extreme Cagefighting (WEC). He is a former WEC Lightweight Champion.

== Background ==
Born and raised in Phoenix, Arizona, Varner attended Deer Valley High School where he competed in wrestling. At Deer Valley, Varner was a two-time Regional Champion and a State Runner Up and went on to compete at Pima Community College where he was a two-time National Qualifier and a National Runner Up, in addition to being an NJCAA All-American and a two-time Academic All-American.

== Mixed martial arts career ==
=== Ultimate Fighting Championship ===
Varner competed twice in the UFC. His first appearance was against veteran Hermes Franca, which Varner lost via submission (armbar) in round three. His final appearance was against formerly undefeated Jason Gilliam, which he won via first round submission (rear naked choke). After this win, Varner transferred to the WEC.

=== World Extreme Cagefighting ===
Varner successfully defended his WEC Lightweight Championship against the previously undefeated Marcus Hicks on August 3, 2008.

He next retained his title on January 25, 2009, defeating Donald Cerrone via technical split decision at WEC 38. The fight was highly competitive and won the Fight of the Night award. However, the fight was stopped prematurely in the fifth round when Cerrone hit Varner's temple with an illegal knee while Varner was still on the ground. Varner was given time to recover, but he was unable to continue, noting that he had double vision and had sustained a broken hand.

Varner faced Benson Henderson to unify the WEC Lightweight Championship at WEC 46 on January 10, 2010. After outboxing and outwrestling Henderson in the first two rounds, Henderson came back and caught Varner in a standing guillotine choke ending the fight at 2:41 of the third round.

Varner was expected to face Kamal Shalorus on April 24, 2010 at WEC 48, but the bout was called off due to an injury sustained by Shalorus. Varner/Shalorus was then rescheduled for June 20, 2010 at WEC 49. The match ended in a split draw.

Varner faced Donald Cerrone in a highly anticipated rematch on September 30, 2010 at WEC 51. He lost the fight via unanimous decision.

Varner faced Shane Roller on December 16, 2010 at WEC 53. He lost via submission in the first round and was subsequently released from the promotion.

=== Post Zuffa ===
In his first post-Zuffa fight, Varner fought Tyler Combs for XFO and won via submission in the first round. He was also in negotiations for a possible fight against DREAM Lightweight Champion Shinya Aoki at the end of May 2011, but the bout did not materialize.

Varner headlined Titan Fighting Championships 20 against Dakota Cochrane on September 23, 2011, losing by unanimous decision.

Varner has signed a three-fight contract with XFC. He debuted on the XFC 14 show, defeating Nate Jolly via KO in round one. He returned on the XFC 16 High Stakes card which took place on February 10, 2012 from the Knoxville Civic Auditorium-Coliseum in Knoxville, Tennessee. He defeated Drew Fickett via TKO due to strikes just 40 seconds into round one.

=== Return to the UFC ===
It was announced that Varner would replace Evan Dunham, who suffered an injury, to fight undefeated prospect Edson Barboza on May 26, 2012 at UFC 146. Varner defeated Barboza by TKO due to punches in the first round.

Varner replaced an injured Terry Etim against Joe Lauzon on August 4, 2012 at UFC on Fox: Shogun vs. Vera. Varner broke his hand in the second round and lost at 2:44 in the third round via triangle choke. However, his performance earned him the $50,000 Fight of the Night bonus and a Fight of the Year nomination at the World MMA Awards.

Varner was scheduled to face Melvin Guillard on December 15, 2012 at the Ultimate Fighter 16 Finale. However, Varner fell ill the day of the event and the bout was scrapped from the card. Varner/Guillard was rescheduled for December 29, 2012 at UFC 155. Varner won the fight via split decision (30–27, 27–30, 30–27). Joe Rogan said post fight that "whoever scored it 30 to 27 for Guillard should never be allowed to judge a fight again."

Varner faced Gleison Tibau on August 31, 2013 at UFC 164. He lost the fight via split decision.

Varner was expected to face Pat Healy on December 14, 2013 at UFC on Fox 9. However, Varner pulled out of the bout due to injury and was replaced by Bobby Green

Varner faced Abel Trujillo on February 1, 2014 at UFC 169, replacing Bobby Green. He lost the back-and-forth fight via knockout in the second round. Despite the loss, Varner was given a Fight of the Night bonus award for the bout. The loss was also Varner's first knockout loss in his career.

Varner faced James Krause on May 24, 2014 at UFC 173. Varner lost the fight via TKO due to injury as he broke his ankle in the first round and was unable to continue into the second round.

Varner next fought Drew Dober on December 13, 2014 at UFC on Fox 13. He lost the fight via a rear-naked choke. Varner landed on his head while attempting a takedown, temporarily rocking him and allowing Dober to take Varner's back to get the choke. In his post-fight interview inside the octagon, Varner announced his retirement from mixed martial arts competition.

== Personal life ==
He is an alumnus of Deer Valley High School in Glendale, Arizona, where he also was a part of the Deer Valley Skyhawk Wrestling Team. He attended Lock Haven University where he joined the Pi Kappa Alpha fraternity and spent his time at that school training both as a wrestler and a boxer, where he was NCBA (National Collegiate Boxing Association) Champion for the nationally recognized Lock Haven University boxing team. Also attended PCC (Pima Community College) outside of Maricopa county in Arizona.

Varner was instrumental in the legalization and forthcoming athletic sanctioning of mixed martial arts in the state of Arizona after giving testimony to the sport's legitimacy and ongoing development as an athletic profession.

After retiring from MMA in 2014, Varner continued his studies that were interrupted when Varner got into the UFC. Eventually Varner graduated with major in marketing and a minor in financing. After graduating he worked at Boston Scientific before transitioning to the stem cell domain.

== Championships and accomplishments ==
- Ultimate Fighting Championship
  - Fight of the Night (Three times)
  - UFC.com Awards
    - 2012: Ranked #3 Upset of the Year vs. Edson Barboza
    - 2014: Ranked #5 Fight of the Year vs. Abel Trujillo
- World Extreme Cagefighting
  - WEC Lightweight Championship (One time)
    - Two successful title defenses
  - Tied (Gabe Ruediger; Hermes França) for most consecutive successful defenses in the Lightweight division
  - Tied (Gabe Ruediger; Hermes França) for most successful defenses in the Lightweight division
  - Fight of the Night (Two Times)
- Sherdog
  - 2012 Upset of the Year vs. Edson Barboza
- World MMA Awards
  - 2012 Fight of the Year vs. Joe Lauzon at UFC on Fox: Shogun vs. Vera
- Bloody Elbow
  - 2012 Upset of the Year vs. Edson Barboza at UFC 146
- FIGHT! Magazine
  - 2012 Upset of the Year vs. Edson Barboza at UFC 146
- Bleacher Report
  - 2014 #5 Ranked Fight of the Year vs. Abel Trujillo at UFC 169

== Mixed martial arts record ==
Professional record breakdown
35 matches	21 wins	11 losses
By knockout	7	2
By submission	11	5
By decision	3	4
Draws	1	
No contests	2	

Res.	Record	Opponent	Method	Event	Date	Round	Time	Location	Notes
Loss	21–11–1 (2)	Drew Dober	Submission (rear-naked choke)	UFC on Fox: dos Santos vs. Miocic	December 13, 2014	1	1:52	Phoenix, Arizona, United States	
Loss	21–10–1 (2)	James Krause	TKO (ankle injury)	UFC 173	May 24, 2014	1	5:00	Las Vegas, Nevada, United States	
Loss	21–9–1 (2)	Abel Trujillo	KO (punch)	UFC 169	February 1, 2014	2	2:32	Newark, New Jersey, United States	Fight of the Night.
Loss	21–8–1 (2)	Gleison Tibau	Decision (split)	UFC 164	August 31, 2013	3	5:00	Milwaukee, Wisconsin, United States	
Win	21–7–1 (2)	Melvin Guillard	Decision (split)	UFC 155	December 29, 2012	3	5:00	Las Vegas, Nevada, United States	
Loss	20–7–1 (2)	Joe Lauzon	Submission (triangle choke)	UFC on Fox: Shogun vs. Vera	August 4, 2012	3	2:44	Los Angeles, California, United States	Fight of the Night; Fight of the Year (2012).
Win	20–6–1 (2)	Edson Barboza	TKO (punches)	UFC 146	May 26, 2012	1	3:23	Las Vegas, Nevada, United States	2012 Upset of the Year.
Win	19–6–1 (2)	Drew Fickett	Submission (punches)	XFC 16	February 10, 2012	1	0:40	Knoxville, Tennessee, United States	160 lb Catchweight.
Win	18–6–1 (2)	Nate Jolly	KO (punches)	XFC 14	October 21, 2011	1	1:09	Orlando, Florida, United States	160 lb Catchweight.
Loss	17–6–1 (2)	Dakota Cochrane	Decision (unanimous)	Titan FC 20	September 23, 2011	3	5:00	Kansas City, Kansas, United States	165 lb Catchweight.
Win	17–5–1 (2)	Tyler Combs	Submission (north-south choke)	XFO 39	May 13, 2011	1	1:30	Hoffman Estates, Illinois, United States	Welterweight bout.
Loss	16–5–1 (2)	Shane Roller	Submission (rear-naked choke)	WEC 53	December 16, 2010	1	3:55	Glendale, Arizona, United States	
Loss	16–4–1 (2)	Donald Cerrone	Decision (unanimous)	WEC 51	September 30, 2010	3	5:00	Broomfield, Colorado, United States	Fight of the Night.
Draw	16–3–1 (2)	Kamal Shalorus	Draw (split)	WEC 49	June 20, 2010	3	5:00	Edmonton, Alberta, Canada	Shalorus had one point deducted in round two for illegal groin kicks.
Loss	16–3 (2)	Benson Henderson	Submission (guillotine choke)	WEC 46	January 10, 2010	3	2:41	Sacramento, California, United States	Lost the WEC Lightweight Championship.
Win	16–2 (2)	Donald Cerrone	Technical Decision (split)	WEC 38	January 25, 2009	5	3:10	San Diego, California, United States	Defended the WEC Lightweight Championship; Fight of the Night.
Win	15–2 (2)	Marcus Hicks	TKO (punches)	WEC 35	August 3, 2008	1	2:08	Las Vegas, Nevada, United States	Defended the WEC Lightweight Championship.
Win	14–2 (2)	Rob McCullough	TKO (punches)	WEC 32	February 13, 2008	3	2:54	Rio Rancho, New Mexico, United States	Won the WEC Lightweight Championship.
Win	13–2 (2)	Sherron Leggett	TKO (punches and elbows)	WEC 29	August 5, 2007	1	4:08	Las Vegas, Nevada, United States	
Win	12–2 (2)	Jason Gilliam	Technical Submission (rear-naked choke)	UFC 68	March 3, 2007	1	1:34	Columbus, Ohio, United States	
Loss	11–2 (2)	Hermes França	Submission (armbar)	UFC 62	August 26, 2006	3	3:31	Las Vegas, Nevada, United States	Fight of the Night.
Win	11–1 (2)	Leonard Wilson	Submission (rear-naked choke)	Rage in the Cage 78	January 14, 2006	2	1:07	Glendale, Arizona, United States	
NC	10–1 (2)	Tony Llamas	No Contest	KOTC 56: Caliente	July 9, 2005	N/A	N/A	Globe, Arizona, United States	Llamas injured by an illegal strike.
Win	10–1 (1)	Paul Arroyo	Submission (punches)	Rage in the Cage 71	June 30, 2005	1	2:03	Tempe, Arizona, United States	
Win	9–1 (1)	Adam Roland	TKO (punches)	Rage in the Cage 70	June 11, 2005	1	2:46	Glendale, Arizona, United States	
Win	8–1 (1)	Jesse Bongfeldt	TKO (punches)	WFF 7: Professional Shooto	July 23, 2004	1	4:12	Vancouver, British Columbia, Canada	
Win	7–1 (1)	Kyle Bradley	Submission (rear-naked choke)	Fight Factory	June 26, 2004	2	2:34	N/A	
Win	6–1 (1)	Kyle Sprouse	Submission (choke)	RITC 63: It's Time	June 12, 2004	1	1:47	Phoenix, Arizona, United States	
Win	5–1 (1)	Garett Davis	Submission (triangle choke)	World Freestyle Fighting 6	May 14, 2004	1	3:52	Vancouver, British Columbia, Canada	
NC	4–1 (1)	James Upshur	No Contest	RITC 61: Relentless	April 30, 2004	2	N/A	Phoenix, Arizona, United States	
Win	4–1	Jarvis Brennaman	Submission (triangle choke)	ECS: Evolution	July 19, 2003	1	1:22	Phoenix, Arizona, United States	
Win	3–1	Dave Klein	Submission (choke)	RITC 50: The Prelude	July 12, 2003	3	1:56	Tucson, Arizona, United States	
Win	2–1	Justin Nauling	Submission (armbar)	RITC 49: Stare Down	June 7, 2003	2	0:38	Phoenix, Arizona, United States	
Loss	1–1	Jesse Moreng	Decision (unanimous)	RITC 47: Unstoppable	June 7, 2003	3	3:00	Phoenix, Arizona, United States	
Win	1–0	Carlos Ortega	Decision (unanimous)	RITC 46: Launching Pad	March 27, 2003	3	3:00	Tempe, Arizona, United States	

Awards and achievements
Preceded by Rob McCullough	5th WEC Lightweight Champion; February 13, 2008 - January 10, 2010	Succeeded by Benson Henderson
