= WEC 38 =

World Extreme Cagefighting mixed martial arts event in 2009

WEC 38: Varner vs. Cerrone
- The poster for WEC 38: Varner vs. Cerrone
- Promotion: World Extreme Cagefighting
- Date: January 25, 2009
- Venue: San Diego Sports Arena
- City: San Diego, California
- Attendance: 10,201
- Total gate: $486,324

Event chronology
WEC 37: Torres vs. Tapia	WEC 38: Varner vs. Cerrone	WEC 39: Brown vs. Garcia

WEC 38: Varner vs. Cerrone was a mixed martial arts event held by World Extreme Cagefighting on January 25, 2009. It aired live on the Versus Network. In the main event, WEC Lightweight Champion Jamie Varner defended his title against undefeated top contender Donald Cerrone.

== Background ==
Featured on the card was a rematch between former WEC Featherweight Champion Urijah Faber and Jens Pulver. Faber was originally lined up to face José Aldo at this event, but Aldo was replaced by Pulver. Aldo was instead moved to a bout with the debuting Fredson Paixao at this event, though Paixao was later replaced by WEC newcomer Rolando Perez due to an injury. The Faber/Aldo matchup would eventually take place at WEC 48 the following year, where Aldo defended his then-WEC Featherweight Championship in a unanimous decision victory.

Ed Ratcliff was originally slated to face WEC newcomer Anthony Njokuani at this event, but was forced from the bout with an injury and replaced by the debuting Ben Henderson.

The event drew an estimated 702,000 viewers on Versus.

== Results ==
Main card
Weight class				Method	Round	Time	Notes
Lightweight	Jamie Varner (c)	def	Donald Cerrone	Decision (technical split) (49–46, 47–48, 49–46)	5	3:10	(Note: For the WEC Lightweight Championship. Bout was stopped after Cerrone landed an illegal knee to the head of Varner while he was on the ground. Since Varner was unable to continue, the bout went to the scorecards.)
Featherweight	Urijah Faber	def	Jens Pulver	Submission (guillotine choke)	1	1:34
Welterweight	Danillo Villefort	def	Mike Campbell	TKO (punches)	1	3:53
Featherweight	José Aldo	def	Rolando Perez	KO (flying knee and punches)	1	4:15
Preliminary card
Lightweight	Benson Henderson	def	Anthony Njokuani	Submission (guillotine choke)	2	0:42
Welterweight	Edgar Garcia	def	Hiromitsu Miura	TKO (punches)	1	1:18
Bantamweight	Dominick Cruz	def	Ian McCall	Decision (unanimous) (30-27, 30-27, 30-27)	3	5:00
Bantamweight	Scott Jorgensen	def	Frank Gomez	Submission (guillotine choke)	1	1:09
Welterweight	Jesse Lennox	def	Blas Avena	TKO (punches)	2	0:41
Bantamweight	Charlie Valencia	def	Seth Dikun	Decision (unanimous) (30-27, 30-27, 30-27)	3	5:00

== Bonus awards ==
Fighters were awarded $7,500 bonuses.

- Fight of the Night: (United States) Jamie Varner vs. (United States) Donald Cerrone
- Knockout of the Night: (Brazil) José Aldo
- Submission of the Night: (United States) Urijah Faber

== Reported payouts ==
The following is the reported payout to the fighters as reported to the California State Athletic Commission. It does not include sponsor money or "locker room" bonuses often given by the WEC and also do not include the WEC's traditional "fight night" bonuses.

- Jamie Varner: $34,000 (includes $17,000 win bonus) def. Donald Cerrone: $9,000
- Urijah Faber: $48,000 (includes $24,000 win bonus) def. Jens Pulver: $35,000
- Danillo Villefort: $8,000 (includes $4,000 win bonus) def. Mike Campbell: $3,000
- José Aldo: $10,000 (includes $5,000 win bonus) def. Rolando Perez: $3,000
- Benson Henderson: $5,000 (includes $2,000 win bonus) def. Anthony Njokuani: $2,000
- Edgar Garcia: $6,000 (includes $3,000 win bonus) def. Hiromitsu Miura: $6,000
- Dominick Cruz: $8,000 (includes $4,000 win bonus) def. Ian McCall: $3,000
- Scott Jorgensen: $8,000 ($includes $4,000 win bonus) def. Frank Gomez: $2,000
- Jesse Lennox: $4,000 (includes $2,000 win bonus) def. Blas Avena: $7,000
- Charlie Valencia: $14,000 (includes $7,000 win bonus) def. Seth Dikun: $2,000

== See also ==
- World Extreme Cagefighting
- List of World Extreme Cagefighting champions
- List of WEC events
- 2009 in WEC
