= 2010 in WEC =

World Extreme Cagefighting events

Information
- First date: January 10, 2010
- Last date: December 16, 2010

Events
- Total events: 8

Fights
- Total fights: 86
- Title fights: 9

Chronology
2009 in WEC	2010 in WEC

The year 2010 was the 10th year in the history of World Extreme Cagefighting, a mixed martial arts promotion based in the United States. In 2010 WEC held 8 events beginning with, WEC 46: Varner vs. Henderson.

== Title fights ==
Title fights in 2010
Weight class				Method	Round	Time	Event	Notes
Lightweight	Benson Henderson (ic)	def.	Jamie Varner (c)	Submission (guillotine choke)	3	2:41	WEC 46: Varner vs. Henderson	(Note: For the unified Lightweight Championship.)
Bantamweight	Dominick Cruz	def.	Brian Bowles (c)	TKO (doctor stoppage)	2	5:00	WEC 47: Bowles vs. Cruz	(Note: For the Bantamweight Championship.)
Lightweight	Benson Henderson (c)	def.	Donald Cerrone	Submission (guillotine choke)	1	1:57	WEC 48: Aldo vs. Faber	(Note: For the Lightweight Championship.)
Featherweight	José Aldo (c)	def.	Urijah Faber	Decision (unanimous) (50-45, 49-46, 49-45)	5	5:00	WEC 48: Aldo vs. Faber	(Note: For the Featherweight Championship.)
Bantamweight	Dominick Cruz (c)	def.	Joseph Benavidez	Decision (split) (47-48, 48-47, 49-46)	5	5:00	WEC 50: Cruz vs. Benavidez 2	(Note: For the Bantamweight Championship.)
Featherweight	José Aldo (c)	def.	Manvel Gamburyan	KO (punches)	2	1:32	WEC 51: Aldo vs. Gamburyan	(Note: For the Featherweight Championship.)
Bantamweight	Dominick Cruz (c)	def.	Scott Jorgensen	Decision (unanimous) (50-45, 50-45, 50-45)	5	5:00	WEC 53: Henderson vs. Pettis	(Note: For the Bantamweight Championship.)
Lightweight	Anthony Pettis	def.	Benson Henderson (c)	Decision (unanimous) (48-47, 48-47, 49-46)	2	1:20	WEC 53: Henderson vs. Pettis	(Note: For the Lightweight Championship.)

== Events list ==
No.	Event	Date	Venue	Location	Attendance
53	WEC 53: Henderson vs. Pettis	December 16, 2010	Jobing.com Arena	Glendale, Arizona	6,348
52	WEC 52: Faber vs. Mizugaki	November 11, 2010	Pearl at The Palms	Las Vegas, Nevada	
51	WEC 51: Aldo vs. Gamburyan	September 30, 2010	1stBank Center	Broomfield, Colorado	3,791
50	WEC 50: Cruz vs. Benavidez	August 18, 2010	Pearl at The Palms	Las Vegas, Nevada	1,861
49	WEC 49: Varner vs. Shalorus	June 20, 2010	Rexall Place	Edmonton, Alberta	5,600
48	WEC 48: Aldo vs. Faber	April 24, 2010	ARCO Arena	Sacramento, California	12,555
47	WEC 47: Bowles vs. Cruz	March 6, 2010	Nationwide Arena	Columbus, Ohio	8,345
46	WEC 46: Varner vs. Henderson	January 10, 2010	ARCO Arena	Sacramento, California	10,027

== WEC 46: Varner vs. Henderson ==
WEC 46: Varner vs. Henderson was an event held on January 10, 2009 at the ARCO Arena in Sacramento, California.

=== Results ===
Main card
Weight class				Method	Round	Time	Notes
Lightweight	Benson Henderson (ic)	def	Jamie Varner (c)	Submission (guillotine choke)	3	2:41	(Note: For the Lightweight Championship unification.)
Featherweight	Urijah Faber	def	Raphael Assunção	Submission (rear naked choke)	3	3:49
Lightweight	Kamal Shalorus	def	Dave Jansen	Decision (unanimous) (30–27, 30–27, 29–28)	3	5:00
Featherweight	Mike Brown	def	Anthony Morrison	Submission (rear naked choke)	1	1:54
Featherweight	Deividas Taurosevičius	def	Mackens Semerzier	Decision (unanimous) (29–28, 29–28, 29–28)	3	5:00
Preliminary card
Bantamweight	Charlie Valencia	def	Akitoshi Tamura	Decision (split) (29–28, 28–29, 29–28)	3	5:00
Bantamweight	Wagnney Fabiano	def	Clint Godfrey	Decision (unanimous) (30–27, 30–27, 30–27)	3	5:00
Featherweight	Mark Hominick	def	Bryan Caraway	Submission (triangle armbar)	1	3:48	(Note: This bout was aired on the live broadcast.)
Bantamweight	Eddie Wineland	def	George Roop	Decision (unanimous) (30–27, 30–27, 30–27)	3	5:00
Bantamweight	Will Campuzano	def	Coty Wheeler	Decision (unanimous) (30–26, 30–27, 30–27)	3	5:00

== WEC 47: Bowles vs. Cruz ==
WEC 47: Bowles vs. Cruz was an event held on March 6, 2010 at the Nationwide Arena in Columbus, Ohio.

=== Results ===
Main card
Weight class				Method	Round	Time	Notes
Bantamweight	Dominick Cruz	def	Brian Bowles (c)	TKO (hand injury)	2	5:00	(Note: For the Bantamweight Championship.)
Bantamweight	Joseph Benavidez	def	Miguel Torres	Submission (guillotine choke)	2	2:57
Featherweight	Javier Vazquez	def	Jens Pulver	Submission (armbar)	1	3:41
Featherweight	LC Davis	def	Deividas Taurosevičius	Decision (majority) (29-28, 29-28, 29-29)	3	5:00
Lightweight	Bart Palaszewski	def	Karen Darabedyan	Submission (armbar)	1	4:40
Preliminary card
Bantamweight	Scott Jorgensen	def	Chad George	Submission (guillotine choke)	1	0:31	(Note: This bout was aired on the live broadcast.)
Featherweight	Chad Mendes	def	Erik Koch	Decision (unanimous) (30–27, 30–27, 30–27)	3	5:00
Lightweight	Anthony Pettis	def	Danny Castillo	KO (head kick and punches)	1	2:17	(Note: This bout was aired on the live broadcast.)
Featherweight	Leonard Garcia	vs	George Roop	Draw (split) (29–27, 27–29, 28–28)	3	5:00	(Note: Roop was docked one point in round 3 for a shot to the groin of Garcia.)
Featherweight	Fredson Paixão	def	Courtney Buck	Technical Submission (rear-naked choke)	1	2:49
Featherweight	Ricardo Lamas	def	Bendy Casimir	KO (knee)	1	3:43

== WEC 48: Aldo vs. Faber ==
WEC 48: Aldo vs. Faber was an event held on April 24, 2010 at the ARCO Arena in Sacramento, California.

=== Results ===
Main card
Weight class				Method	Round	Time	Notes
Featherweight	José Aldo (c)	def.	Urijah Faber	Decision (unanimous) (50-45, 49-46, 49-45)	5	5:00	(Note: For the Featherweight Championship.)
Lightweight	Benson Henderson (c)	def.	Donald Cerrone	Submission (guillotine choke)	1	1:57	(Note: For the Lightweight Championship.)
Featherweight	Manvel Gamburyan	def.	Mike Brown	KO (punches)	1	2:22
Lightweight	Shane Roller	def.	Anthony Njokuani	Submission (rear-naked choke)	1	3:21
Bantamweight	Scott Jorgensen	def.	Antonio Banuelos	Decision (unanimous) (29-28, 29-28, 29-28)	3	5:00
Preliminary card (Spike)
Featherweight	Leonard Garcia	def.	Chan Sung Jung	Decision (split) (29-28, 28-29, 29-28)	3	5:00
Lightweight	Anthony Pettis	def.	Alex Karalexis	Submission (triangle choke)	2	1:35
Preliminary card
Bantamweight	Takeya Mizugaki	def.	Rani Yahya	Decision (unanimous) (29-28, 30-27, 29-28)	3	5:00
Featherweight	Chad Mendes	def.	Anthony Morrison	Submission (guillotine choke)	1	2:13	(Note: This bout aired on the Spike broadcast following the Karalexis vs. Pettis fight. This bout also aired on the PPV broadcast following the Visher vs. Toner fight.)
Bantamweight	Brad Pickett	def.	Demetrious Johnson	Decision (unanimous)	3	5:00	(Note: This bout aired on the PPV broadcast following the Brown vs. Gamburyan fight.)
Featherweight	Tyler Toner	def.	Brandon Visher	TKO (elbows)	1	2:36	(Note: This bout aired on the PPV broadcast following the Henderson vs. Cerrone fight.)

== WEC 49: Varner vs. Shalorus ==
WEC 49: Varner vs. Shalorus was an event held on June 20, 2010 at Rexall Place in Edmonton, Alberta, Canada.

=== Results ===
Main card
Weight class				Method	Round	Time	Notes
Lightweight	Jamie Varner	vs.	Kamal Shalorus	Draw (split) (29-27, 27-29, 28-28)	3	5:00	(Note: Shalorus had one point deducted in round 2 for a kick to the groin.)
Featherweight	Josh Grispi	def	LC Davis	Technical Submission (guillotine choke)	1	2:33
Featherweight	Mark Hominick	def	Yves Jabouin	TKO (punches)	2	3:21
Lightweight	Chris Horodecki	def	Danny Downes	Submission (rear-naked choke)	3	1:09
Bantamweight	Eddie Wineland	def	Will Campuzano	TKO (punches)	2	4:44
Preliminary card
Lightweight	Will Kerr	def	Karen Darabedyan	Submission (armbar)	1	1:20	(Note: This bout was aired on the live broadcast.)
Featherweight	Wagnney Fabiano	def	Frank Gomez	Decision (unanimous) (30–27, 30–27, 30–27)	3	5:00
Featherweight	Erik Koch	def	Bendy Casimir	Submission (triangle choke)	1	3:01	(Note: This bout was aired on the live broadcast.)
Featherweight	Diego Nunes	vs	Raphael Assunção	Decision (split) (30–27, 28–29, 29–28)	3	5:00
Bantamweight	Chris Cariaso	def	Rafael Rebello	Decision (unanimous) (29-28, 29-28, 30-26)	3	5:00
Catchweight (142 lb)	Renan Barão	def	Anthony Leone	Submission (armbar)	3	2:29

== WEC 50: Cruz vs. Benavidez 2 ==
WEC 50: Cruz vs. Benavidez 2 was an event held on August 18, 2010 at the Pearl at The Palms in Las Vegas, Nevada.

=== Results ===
Main card
Weight class				Method	Round	Time	Notes
Bantamweight	Dominick Cruz (c)	def	Joseph Benavidez	Decision (split) (47–48, 48–47, 49–46)	5	5:00	(Note: For the Bantamweight Championship.)
Lightweight	Anthony Pettis	def	Shane Roller	Submission (triangle choke)	3	4:51
Featherweight	Chad Mendes	def	Cub Swanson	Decision (unanimous) (30–27, 29–28, 29–28)	3	5:00
Bantamweight	Scott Jorgensen	def	Brad Pickett	Decision (unanimous) (30–27, 30–27, 30–27)	3	5:00
Lightweight	Bart Palaszewski	def	Zach Micklewright	KO (punches)	2	0:31
Preliminary card
Lightweight	Maciej Jewtuszko	def	Anthony Njokuani	TKO (punches)	1	1:35
Featherweight	Javier Vazquez	def	Mackens Semerzier	Submission (rear-naked choke)	2	1:35
Lightweight	Ricardo Lamas	def	Dave Jansen	Decision (unanimous) (29–28, 29–28, 29–28)	3	5:00
Featherweight	Fredson Paixão	def	Bryan Caraway	Decision (split) (28–29, 29–28, 29–28)	3	5:00
Lightweight	Danny Castillo	def	Dustin Poirier	Decision (unanimous) (30–27, 29–28, 30–27)	3	5:00

== WEC 51: Aldo vs. Gamburyan ==
WEC 51: Aldo vs. Gamburyan was an event held on September 30, 2010 at the 1stBank Center in Broomfield, Colorado.

=== Results ===
Main card
Weight class				Method	Round	Time	Notes
Featherweight	José Aldo (c)	def	Manvel Gamburyan	KO (punches)	2	1:32	(Note: For the Featherweight Championship.)
Lightweight	Donald Cerrone	def	Jamie Varner	Decision (unanimous) (30-27, 30-27, 30-27)	3	5:00
Bantamweight	Miguel Torres	def	Charlie Valencia	Submission (rear-naked choke)	2	2:25
Featherweight	George Roop	def	Chan Sung Jung	KO (head kick)	2	1:30
Featherweight	Mark Hominick	def	Leonard Garcia	Decision (split) (29-28, 28-29, 29-28)	3	5:00
Preliminary card
Featherweight	Mike Brown	def	Cole Province	TKO (punches)	1	1:18	(Note: This bout was aired on the live broadcast.)
Lightweight	Chris Horodecki	def	Ed Ratcliff	Decision (split) (28-29, 30–27, 30–27)	3	5:00
Bantamweight	Antonio Banuelos	def	Chad George	Decision (unanimous) (29-28, 30-27, 30-27)	3	5:00
Lightweight	Zhang Tiequan	def	Pablo Garza	Submission (guillotine choke)	1	2:26	(Note: This bout was aired on the live broadcast.)
Featherweight	Diego Nunes	def	Tyler Toner	Decision (unanimous) (29-28, 29-28, 30-27)	3	5:00
Bantamweight	Demetrious Johnson	def	Nick Pace	Decision (unanimous) (30-27, 30-27, 30-27)	3	5:00

== WEC 52: Faber vs. Mizugaki ==
WEC 52: Faber vs. Mizugaki was an event held on November 11, 2010 at the Pearl at The Palms in Las Vegas, Nevada.

=== Results ===
Main card
Weight class				Method	Round	Time	Notes
Bantamweight	Urijah Faber	def	Takeya Mizugaki	Technical Submission (rear-naked choke)	1	4:50
Featherweight	Chad Mendes	def	Javier Vazquez	Decision (unanimous) (30-27, 30-27, 30-27)	3	5:00
Featherweight	Erik Koch	def	Francisco Rivera	TKO (head kick and punches)	1	1:36
Bantamweight	Joseph Benavidez	def	Wagnney Fabiano	Submission (guillotine choke)	2	2:45
Bantamweight	Demetrious Johnson	def	Damacio Page	Submission (guillotine choke)	3	2:27
Preliminary card
Featherweight	Raphael Assunção	def	LC Davis	Decision (unanimous) (30-27, 30-27, 30-27)	3	5:00
Lightweight	Anthony Njokuani	def	Edward Faaloloto	TKO (knees and elbows)	2	4:54
Lightweight	Dustin Poirier	def	Zach Micklewright	TKO (punches)	1	0:53
Bantamweight	Michael McDonald	def	Clint Godfrey	Submission (armbar)	1	2:42
Featherweight	Cub Swanson	def	Mackens Semerzier	Decision (split) (29-28, 28-29, 29-28)	3	5:00	(Note: This bout aired on the live broadcast.)
Featherweight	Yves Jabouin	def	Brandon Visher	Decision (unanimous) (30-27, 30-27, 30-27)	3	5:00

== WEC 53: Henderson vs. Pettis ==
WEC 53: Henderson vs. Pettis was an event held on December 16, 2010 at the Jobing.com Arena in Glendale, Arizona.

=== Results ===
Main card
Weight class				Method	Round	Time	Notes
Lightweight	Anthony Pettis	def	Benson Henderson (c)	Decision (unanimous) (48-47, 48-47, 49-46)	5	5:00	(Note: For the WEC Lightweight Championship.)
Bantamweight	Dominick Cruz (c)	def	Scott Jorgensen	Decision (unanimous) (50–45, 50–45, 50–45)	5	5:00	(Note: For the WEC Bantamweight Championship and the Inaugural UFC Bantamweight Championship.)
Lightweight	Donald Cerrone	def	Chris Horodecki	Submission (triangle choke)	2	2:43
Lightweight	Kamal Shalorus	def	Bart Palaszewski	Decision (split) (30–27, 28–29, 29–28)	3	5:00
Preliminary card
Lightweight	Danny Downes	def	Zhang Tiequan	Decision (unanimous) (29–28, 30–27, 29–28)	3	5:00
Lightweight	Shane Roller	def	Jamie Varner	Submission (rear-naked choke)	1	3:55
Bantamweight	Brad Pickett	def	Ivan Menjivar	Decision (unanimous) (29–28, 29–28, 29–28)	3	5:00
Bantamweight	Eddie Wineland	def	Ken Stone	KO (slam)	1	2:11
Lightweight	Danny Castillo	def	Will Kerr	KO (punches)	1	1:25
Lightweight	Iuri Alcantara	def	Ricardo Lamas	KO (punches)	1	3:26
Bantamweight	Renan Barão	def	Chris Cariaso	Submission (rear-naked choke)	1	3:47

== See also ==
- World Extreme Cagefighting
- List of World Extreme Cagefighting champions
- List of WEC events
