= WEC 47 =

World Extreme Cagefighting mixed martial arts event in 2010

WEC 47: Bowles vs. Cruz
- The poster for WEC 47: Bowles vs. Cruz
- Promotion: World Extreme Cagefighting
- Date: March 6, 2010
- Venue: Nationwide Arena
- City: Columbus, Ohio
- Attendance: 8,345
- Total gate: $401,000

Event chronology
WEC 46: Varner vs. Henderson	WEC 47: Bowles vs. Cruz	WEC 48: Aldo vs. Faber

WEC 47: Bowles vs. Cruz was a mixed martial arts event held by World Extreme Cagefighting on March 6, 2010. It was held at the Nationwide Arena in Columbus, Ohio

== Background ==
The only WEC event held in Ohio, WEC 47 coincided with the Arnold Sports Festival, which annually draws up to 150,000 sports fans to Columbus, Ohio. Previously, the UFC held three cards – UFC 68, UFC 82 and UFC 96 – in Columbus during this festival.

Diego Nunes was originally slated to face Leonard Garcia at this event, but was forced from the card with an injury. Nunes was later replaced by George Roop.

Bryan Caraway was expected to face Fredson Paixao at this event, but was replaced by Courtney Buck after injuring his knee. The Paixao/Caraway bout was rescheduled for WEC 50 that August, where Paixao won via split decision.

Stephan Bonnar filled in for Frank Mir as color commentator, due to training commitments for Mir. Bonnar was named as the promotion's final permanent color commentator shortly afterwards.

This was the last WEC event to feature announcer Joe Martinez as the regular ring announcer, due to family reasons and to focus full-time on his work with Golden Boy Promotions. Martinez later made a one-off return at WEC 52, as his replacement Bruce Buffer was in Germany to announce UFC 122.

The event drew an estimated 373,000 viewers on Versus.

== Results ==
Main card
Weight class				Method	Round	Time	Notes
Bantamweight	Dominick Cruz	def	Brian Bowles (c)	TKO (hand injury)	2	5:00	(Note: For the WEC Bantamweight Championship.)
Bantamweight	Joseph Benavidez	def	Miguel Torres	Submission (guillotine choke)	2	2:57
Featherweight	Javier Vazquez	def	Jens Pulver	Submission (armbar)	1	3:41
Featherweight	LC Davis	def	Deividas Taurosevičius	Decision (majority) (29-28, 29-28, 29-29)	3	5:00
Lightweight	Bart Palaszewski	def	Karen Darabedyan	Submission (armbar)	1	4:40
Preliminary card
Bantamweight	Scott Jorgensen	def	Chad George	Submission (guillotine choke)	1	0:31	(Note: This bout was aired on the live broadcast.)
Featherweight	Chad Mendes	def	Erik Koch	Decision (unanimous) (30–27, 30–27, 30–27)	3	5:00
Lightweight	Anthony Pettis	def	Danny Castillo	KO (head kick and punches)	1	2:17	(Note: This bout was aired on the live broadcast.)
Featherweight	Leonard Garcia	vs	George Roop	Draw (split) (29–27, 27–29, 28–28)	3	5:00	(Note: Roop was docked one point in round 3 for a shot to the groin of Garcia.)
Featherweight	Fredson Paixão	def	Courtney Buck	Technical Submission (rear-naked choke)	1	2:49
Featherweight	Ricardo Lamas	def	Bendy Casimir	KO (knee)	1	3:43

== Bonus awards ==
Fighters were awarded $10,000 bonuses.

- Fight of the Night: (United States) Leonard Garcia vs. (United States) George Roop
- Knockout of the Night: (United States) Anthony Pettis
- Submission of the Night: (United States) Joseph Benavidez

== Reported payout ==
The following is the reported payout to the fighters as reported to the Ohio Athletic Commission. It does not include sponsor money or "locker room" bonuses often given by the WEC and also do not include the WEC's traditional "fight night" bonuses.

- Dominick Cruz: $18,000 (includes $9,000 win bonus) def. Brian Bowles: $12,000
- Joseph Benavidez: $29,000 ($14,500 win bonus) def. Miguel Torres: $26,000
- Javier Vazquez: $12,000 ($6,000 win bonus) def. Jens Pulver: $14,000
- LC Davis: $18,000 ($9,000 win bonus) def. Deividas Taurosevičius: $9,000
- Bart Palaszewski: $12,000 ($6,000 win bonus) def. Karen Darabedyan: $4,000
- Scott Jorgensen: $16,000 ($8,000 win bonus) def. Chad George: $3,000
- Chad Mendes: $8,000 ($4,000 win bonus) def. Erik Koch: $3,000
- Anthony Pettis: $6,000 ($3,000 win bonus) def. Danny Castillo: $9,500
- Leonard Garcia: $14,000 vs. George Roop: $3,000 ^
- Fredson Paixao: $4,000 ($2,000 win bonus) def. Courtney Buck: $3,000
- Ricardo Lamas: $10,000 ($5,000 win bonus) def. Bendy Casimir $3,000

^ Both fighters earned show money; bout declared split draw.

== See also ==
- World Extreme Cagefighting
- List of World Extreme Cagefighting champions
- List of WEC events
- 2010 in WEC
