= Diego Nunes =

Diego Nunes may refer to:

- Diego Nunes (racing driver) (born 1986), Brazilian racing driver
- Diego Nunes (fighter) (born 1982), Brazilian mixed martial artist
