= WEC 53 =

World Extreme Cagefighting mixed martial arts event in 2010

WEC 53: Henderson vs. Pettis
- The poster for WEC 53: Henderson vs. Pettis
- Promotion: World Extreme Cagefighting
- Date: December 16, 2010
- Venue: Jobing.com Arena
- City: Glendale, Arizona
- Attendance: 6,348

Event chronology
WEC 52: Faber vs. Mizugaki	WEC 53: Henderson vs. Pettis

WEC 53: Henderson vs. Pettis was a mixed martial arts event held by World Extreme Cagefighting that took place on December 16, 2010 at Jobing.com Arena in the Phoenix suburb of Glendale, Arizona. The event was the first time that Zuffa has hosted an event in Arizona. This was the final WEC event, due to the merger with the UFC.

== Background ==
This was the final WEC event before merging with the Ultimate Fighting Championship in 2011.

This event was unique in that the WEC and AMP Energy allowed fans to choose the location of the event. The fans were given 30 options and the finalists were Milwaukee, Nashville and Phoenix. During the live telecast of WEC 50, Phoenix was announced as the winner of the contest.

Maciej Jewtuszko was expected to face Ricardo Lamas at this event. However, Jewtuszko had to withdraw as he suffered a broken hand during training. Jewtuszko was replaced by WEC newcomer Iuri Alcântara.

This event was named Sherdog's 2010 Event of the Year.

The event drew an average of 615,000 viewers on Versus.

== UFC Lightweight title eliminator ==
The winner of the WEC Lightweight Championship fight between reigning champion Benson Henderson and challenger Anthony Pettis was scheduled to face the winner of the UFC 125 Frankie Edgar (C) vs. Gray Maynard title fight in order to unify the WEC and UFC lightweight championships. However, the Edgar/Maynard fight ended in a draw necessitating a UFC 136 rematch (which Edgar won). Though Anthony Pettis won the final WEC lightweight title bout, defeating Henderson via unanimous decision, he opted not to wait for the winner of Edgar/Maynard rematch and instead fought Clay Guida at The Ultimate Fighter 13 Finale, losing by unanimous decision and negating his promised title shot (though he would win the UFC Lightweight Championship in his own right over Henderson in August 2013.)

== UFC Bantamweight Championship ==
The winner of the Bantamweight Championship fight between reigning champion Dominick Cruz and challenger Scott Jorgensen determined both the final WEC Bantamweight Champion and the inaugural UFC Bantamweight Champion. This is the only UFC title fight to ever take place on another promotion's card, and the first UFC title bout to air on free television since UFC 75 in July 2007. Cruz defeated Jorgensen via unanimous decision to retain his title and become the new UFC champion.

== Results ==
Main card
Weight class				Method	Round	Time	Notes
Lightweight	Anthony Pettis	def	Benson Henderson (c)	Decision (unanimous) (48-47, 48-47, 49-46)	5	5:00	(Note: For the WEC Lightweight Championship.)
Bantamweight	Dominick Cruz (c)	def	Scott Jorgensen	Decision (unanimous) (50–45, 50–45, 50–45)	5	5:00	(Note: As part of the UFC-WEC merger, the WEC Bantamweight Championship will become the UFC (Men's) Bantamweight Championship.)
Lightweight	Donald Cerrone	def	Chris Horodecki	Submission (triangle choke)	2	2:43
Lightweight	Kamal Shalorus	def	Bart Palaszewski	Decision (split) (30–27, 28–29, 29–28)	3	5:00
Preliminary card
Lightweight	Danny Downes	def	Zhang Tiequan	Decision (unanimous) (29–28, 30–27, 29–28)	3	5:00
Lightweight	Shane Roller	def	Jamie Varner	Submission (rear-naked choke)	1	3:55
Bantamweight	Brad Pickett	def	Ivan Menjivar	Decision (unanimous) (29–28, 29–28, 29–28)	3	5:00
Bantamweight	Eddie Wineland	def	Ken Stone	KO (slam)	1	2:11
Lightweight	Danny Castillo	def	Will Kerr	KO (punches)	1	1:25
Lightweight	Iuri Alcântara	def	Ricardo Lamas	KO (punches)	1	3:26
Bantamweight	Renan Barão	def	Chris Cariaso	Submission (rear-naked choke)	1	3:47

== Bonus awards ==
Fighters were awarded $10,000 bonuses.

- Fight of the Night: (United States) Benson Henderson vs. (United States) Anthony Pettis
- Knockout of the Night: (United States) Eddie Wineland
- Submission of the Night: (United States) Shane Roller

== See also ==
- World Extreme Cagefighting
- List of World Extreme Cagefighting champions
- List of WEC events
- 2010 in WEC
