= Javier Vazquez (fighter) =

Cuban mixed martial artist

- Born: Luis Javier Vazquez; April 27, 1977 (age 49); Santiago, Cuba
- Other names: Showtime
- Nationality: Cuban; American
- Height: 5 ft 7 in (1.70 m)
- Weight: 145 lb (66 kg; 10.4 st)
- Division: Lightweight; Featherweight
- Reach: 69 in (175 cm)
- Style: Brazilian jiu-jitsu, Submission wrestling
- Stance: Southpaw
- Fighting out of: Pomona, California, United States
- Teacher: Rodrigo Medeiros
- Rank: 5th degree black belt in Brazilian Jiu-Jitsu
- Years active: 1998–2013

Mixed martial arts record
- Total: 21
- Wins: 16
- By submission: 11
- By decision: 5
- Losses: 5
- By decision: 5

Other information
- Mixed martial arts record from Sherdog

Luis Javier Vazquez (born April 27, 1977) is a retired Cuban-American mixed martial artist. A professional from 1998 until 2011, he competed for the UFC, WEC, Shooto, ShoXC, EliteXC, and King of the Cage. He is the former King of the Cage Lightweight Champion.

== Early life ==
Born in Santiago, Cuba, on April 27, 1977, Javier Vazquez came to the United States at the age of four. He grew up in El Monte, California, and started wrestling as a sophomore at Arroyo High School at the age of 15. In 1994, he placed 3rd at the CIF wrestling tournament and continued his stellar high school career by placing 4th in the Southern Section Masters tournament. He was just one match away from placing in the high school state wrestling championships, ending up in the top 12 in the state at 130 lbs. He was voted team captain in both his junior and senior years.

Vazquez continued his wrestling career at Mt. San Antonio College where he again proved himself to be one of "the best of the best" by finishing 7th in the state and being voted team captain for his leadership on and off the mat.

In 1997, Vazquez started learning jiu-jitsu with the renowned Carlson Gracie Team. He competed in every jiu-jitsu and submission tournament he could and eventually found himself participating in mixed martial arts (MMA). His first no-holds-barred matches were at Neutral Grounds 5 in 1998. Several more fights in smaller venues followed, and he then took time off from fighting to train and compete in jiu-jitsu. After only five years of training, he earned his black belt from the Carlson Gracie Team. In 2005, Vazquez won the North American trials for the ADCC Submission Wrestling World Championship, but dropped out before competition due to a groin injury.

== MMA career ==
=== Early career ===
In December 2009, Vazquez was named the "most inspirational performance of the decade" in MMA by Sports Illustrated magazine for his fight against Alberto Crane where he fought three rounds with a torn ACL. He went on to fight for Elite XC and was able to break free from his contract before the company folded. He signed to fight against LC Davis at Affliction: Trilogy, but the event folded 10 days before the fight was supposed to take place.

=== World Extreme Cagefighting ===
Vazquez then signed with WEC and made his promotional debut against Davis at WEC 42, In a major upset, Vazquez lost a controversial split decision to Davis. Vazquez rebounded quickly as he replaced an injured Mark Hominick against Deividas Taurosevicius at WEC 43 but lost another split decision.

Vazquez faced and defeated former UFC Lightweight Champion and former WEC featherweight title challenger Jens Pulver via armbar on March 6, 2010, at WEC 47. He defeated decorated grappler Mackens Semerzier via second round submission on August 18, 2010, at WEC 50. Vazquez was defeated by Chad Mendes via unanimous decision on November 11, 2010, at WEC 52.

=== Ultimate Fighting Championship ===
In October 2010, WEC merged with the Ultimate Fighting Championship (UFC). As part of the merger, all WEC fighters were transferred to the UFC. Vazquez defeated The Ultimate Fighter 2 winner and former lightweight title contender Joe Stevenson via unanimous decision on June 26, 2011, at UFC on Versus 4.

On January 13, 2013, Vazquez announced on Sherdog Radio Network's Rewind show that he has officially retired from MMA competition.

== Personal life ==
Vazquez was concurrently diagnosed with stage 3 colon cancer. After undergoing Gerson therapy and defeating cancer, Vazquez opened Javier Vazquez Jiu-Jitsu Academy in Rancho Cucamonga, California. He has recently taken up cycling.

== Instructor lineage ==
Mitsuyo "Count Koma" Maeda → Carlos Gracie Sr. → Carlson Gracie Sr. → Rodrigo Medeiros → Javier Vazquez

== Championships and accomplishments ==
- King of the Cage
  - KOTC Lightweight Championship (One time)

== Mixed martial arts record ==
Professional record breakdown
21 matches	16 wins	5 losses
By submission	11	0
By decision	5	5

Res.	Record	Opponent	Method	Event	Date	Round	Time	Location	Notes
Win	16–5	Joe Stevenson	Decision (unanimous)	UFC Live: Kongo vs. Barry	June 26, 2011	3	5:00	Pittsburgh, Pennsylvania, United States	
Loss	15–5	Chad Mendes	Decision (unanimous)	WEC 52	November 11, 2010	3	5:00	Las Vegas, Nevada, United States	
Win	15–4	Mackens Semerzier	Submission (rear-naked choke)	WEC 50	August 18, 2010	2	1:35	Las Vegas, Nevada, United States	
Win	14–4	Jens Pulver	Submission (armbar)	WEC 47	March 6, 2010	1	3:41	Columbus, Ohio, United States	
Loss	13–4	Deividas Taurosevicius	Decision (split)	WEC 43	October 10, 2009	3	5:00	San Antonio, Texas, United States	
Loss	13–3	LC Davis	Decision (split)	WEC 42	August 9, 2009	3	5:00	Las Vegas, Nevada, United States	
Win	13–2	Mark Kergosien	Submission (guillotine choke)	Ultimate Chaos	June 27, 2009	1	0:59	Biloxi, Mississippi, United States	
Win	12–2	JC Pennington	Submission (rear-naked choke)	ShoXC: Elite Challenger Series	October 26, 2007	1	1:15	Santa Ynez, California, United States	Featherweight debut.
Win	11–2	Adriano Pereira	Decision (split)	EliteXC: Destiny	February 10, 2007	3	5:00	Southaven, Mississippi, United States	
Win	10–2	Rob Emerson	Decision (split)	Shooto: Warrior Spirit:Evolution	November 14, 2003	3	5:00	Las Vegas, Nevada, United States	
Loss	9–2	Alberto Crane	Decision (split)	KOTC 21: Invasion	February 21, 2003	3	5:00	Albuquerque, New Mexico, United States	Lost the KOTC Lightweight Championship.
Win	9–1	David Gardner	Submission (kneebar)	KOTC 16: Double Cross	August 2, 2002	1	4:31	San Jacinto, California, United States	Defended the KOTC Lightweight Championship.
Win	8–1	Rumina Sato	Decision (unanimous)	Shooto: Treasure Hunt 7	June 29, 2002	3	5:00	Osaka, Japan	
Win	7–1	Sean Wilmot	Submission (armbar)	KOTC 13: Revolution	May 17, 2002	1	1:57	Reno, Nevada, United States	Defended the KOTC Lightweight Championship.
Win	6–1	Philip Perez	Submission (triangle choke)	KOTC 10: Critical Mass	August 4, 2001	2	3:58	San Jacinto, California, United States	Won the vacant KOTC Lightweight Championship.
Win	5–1	Farrell Frisby	Submission (heel hook)	KOTC 9: Showtime	June 23, 2001	1	0:48	San Jacinto, California, United States	
Win	4–1	Antonio Emae	Submission (injury)	KOTC 3: Knockout Nightmare	April 15, 2000	1	1:42	San Jacinto, California, United States	
Win	3–1	Louie Cercedez	Submission (armbar)	Empire 1 Official	August 15, 1999	1	N/A	Corona, California, United States	
Loss	2–1	Victor Hunsaker	Decision (split)	Neutral Grounds 5	June 28, 1998	1	11:00	United States	
Win	2–0	Kim Kellenberger	Decision (unanimous)	Neutral Grounds 5	June 28, 1998	1	11:00	United States	
Win	1–0	Sean Kim	Submission (armbar)	Neutral Grounds 5	June 28, 1998	1	1:37	United States	
