= Anthony Njokuani =

Nigerian mixed martial artist

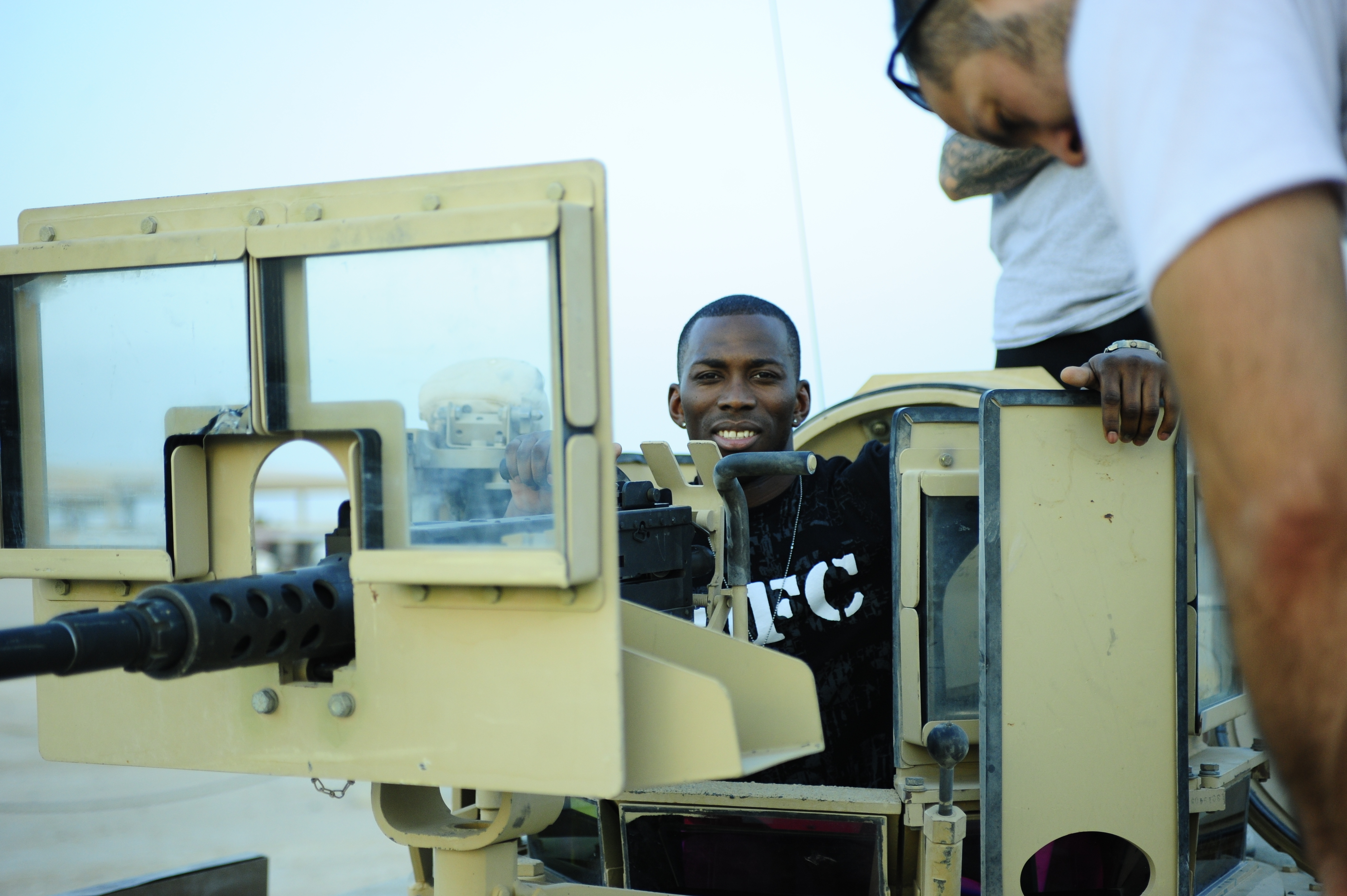
- Njokuani visiting Camp Buehring, Kuwait, in 2012.
- Born: Anthony Obinnia Njokuani; March 1, 1980 (age 46); Enugu, Nigeria
- Other names: The Assassin
- Nationality: American; Nigerian
- Height: 6 ft 0 in (1.83 m)
- Weight: 174 lb (79 kg; 12.4 st)
- Division: Welterweight; Lightweight
- Reach: 75 1/2 in (192 cm)
- Fighting out of: Las Vegas, Nevada, United States
- Team: Janjira Muay Thai; One Kick's Gym; Sergio Penha BJJ
- Trainer: Saeksan Janjira; Nick "One Kick" Blomgren; Sergio Penha
- Years active: 2003–present

Kickboxing record
- Total: 27
- Wins: 25
- Losses: 2
- By knockout: 1

Mixed martial arts record
- Total: 35
- Wins: 18
- By knockout: 10
- By decision: 8
- Losses: 16
- By knockout: 2
- By submission: 7
- By decision: 7
- No contests: 1

Other information
- Notable relatives: Chidi Njokuani (brother)
- Mixed martial arts record from Sherdog
- Last updated on: April 20, 2013

Anthony Obinna Njokuani // (born March 1, 1980) is a Nigerian-American professional mixed martial artist and kickboxer. A professional competitor since 2003, Njokuani has also formerly competed for the UFC, WEC, and ONE Championship.

== Background ==
Born in Enugu, Nigeria on March 1, 1980, Anthony Njokuani and his family immigrated to the United States in 1983, settling in Garland, Texas. Njokuani began his martial arts training in Tae Kwon Do at the age of 17 before later moving on to Muay Thai and then mixed martial arts at the age of 21. Njokuani's younger brother, Chidi Njokuani, is also a professional mixed martial artist.

== Career ==
=== Early career (2001–2008) ===
Njokuani began his professional career in 1999, initially fighting as a kickboxer. He enjoyed some success in the sport by compiling a 24–0 record and winning the Kansas state Muay Thai title. He turned his hand to mixed martial arts in 2003 and became champion of the Texas-based Art of War promotion in 2007 before making a brief return to kickboxing to compete for the Oklahoma Destroyers in the -74.3 kg/164 lb division in the team-based World Combat League promotion during the 2007-08 season.

Having compiled a 9–1 (1) MMA record by 2008, Njokuani signed with World Extreme Cagefighting.

=== World Extreme Cagefighting (2009–2010) ===
Njokuani made his promotional debut on January 25, 2009, at WEC 38, losing to future WEC Lightweight Champion and future UFC Lightweight Champion, Benson Henderson via second round submission.

Njokuani was expected to face Anthony Pettis on April 5, 2009, at WEC 40. However, Pettis pulled out of the fight with a hand injury and was replaced by Bart Palaszewski. Njokuani defeated Palaszewski via TKO in the second round.

Njokuani next face Muhsin Corbbrey on October 10, 2009, at WEC 43. Njokuani defeated Corbbrey via second-round TKO.

Njokuani fought IFL veteran Chris Horodecki, who made his WEC debut on December 19, 2009, at WEC 45. Njokuani won via first-round TKO, earning the Knockout of the Night award for the third consecutive time in the WEC.

Njokuani faced Shane Roller at WEC 48 on April 24, 2010. He lost the fight via first round rear-naked choke submission.

He was defeated by newcomer Maciej Jewtuszko via first-round TKO at WEC 50.

Njokuani defeated WEC newcomer Edward Faaloloto via second-round TKO on November 11, 2010, at WEC 52.

=== Ultimate Fighting Championship (2011–2014) ===
In October 2010, World Extreme Cagefighting merged with the Ultimate Fighting Championship. As part of the merger, all WEC fighters were transferred to the UFC.

In his UFC debut, Njokuani faced touted prospect Edson Barboza on March 19, 2011, at UFC 128. He lost the fight via unanimous decision, but the bout won the Fight of the Night bonus.

Njokuani fought Andre Winner on July 2, 2011, at UFC 132, winning via unanimous decision (30-27, 30-26, 30-26). UFC commentator, Joe Rogan, called it Njokuani's best performance of his career. With this performance, Njokuani became the sixth fighter to land over 100 significant strikes in a single bout.

Njokuani was expected to face Paul Taylor on November 5, 2011, at UFC 138. However, just days before the event, Taylor pulled out of the bout citing an injury. With no time to find a suitable replacement the bout was scrapped.

Njokuani was expected to face Ramsey Nijem on December 30, 2011, at UFC 141. However, Nijem was forced out the bout with an injury and replaced by Danny Castillo. He lost the fight via split decision.

Njokuani defeated John Makdessi on April 21, 2012, at UFC 145 via unanimous decision (30-27, 30-27, 30-27).

Njokuani was expected to face Paul Taylor on July 11, 2012, at UFC on Fuel TV: Munoz vs. Weidman. However, Taylor was forced out of the bout with yet another injury and replaced by Rafael dos Anjos. Njokuani lost the fight via unanimous decision, and was sidelined for six months as he recovered from surgery to repair a broken right hand suffered in the bout.

Njokuani faced debuting Strikeforce fighter Roger Bowling on April 20, 2013, at UFC on Fox 7. He won the fight via KO in the second round.

A bout with Paul Taylor was scheduled for the third time and was expected to take place on October 26, 2013, at UFC Fight Night 30. However, Taylor was forced to pull out of the bout once again with another injury and later retired. Taylor was replaced this time by Al Iaquinta. On September 24, Njokuani also pulled out of the event with an injury. and was replaced by Piotr Hallmann.

After over a year away from the cage, Njokuani returned to face Vinc Pichel on May 24, 2014, at UFC 173. He lost the fight via unanimous decision.

Njokuani faced Daron Cruickshank on October 4, 2014, at UFC Fight Night: MacDonald vs. Saffiedine. He lost the fight by unanimous decision, and was subsequently released from the promotion.

=== Legacy Fighting Championship (2014–present) ===
Just two days after his UFC release was announced, it was announced that Njokuani had signed a multi-fight deal with Legacy FC. He made his debut against David Burrow at Legacy FC 38 on February 13, 2015. Despite dominating the first two rounds via his stand up, Njokuani lost the fight via submission in the third round.

=== Lion Fight ===
On February 3, 2017, Njokuani returned to Muay Thai action at Lion Fight 34 at the Tropicana in Las Vegas. He defeated Australia's Chris Harrington by third round (T)KO to keep his undefeated record.

=== ONE Championship ===
On October 6, 2018, Njokuani made his ONE Championship debut in Bangkok, Thailand against former K-1 World MAX and shoot boxing champion Andy Souwer at ONE Championship: Kingdom of Heroes. He won by split decision.

On February 22, 2019, he faced future ONE Lightweight Kickboxing World Champion Regian Eersel in Singapore at ONE Championship: Call to Greatness. Njokuani lost by second-round knockout. Afterwards, he tried to overturn the result of the fight due to Eersel landing an elbow but the ruling was upheld.

=== Gamebred Fighting Championship ===
Njokuani faced Wesley Golden on December 17, 2021, at Gamebred Fighting Championship 3. He won the bout via ground and pound TKO in the first round.

Njokuani faced Raimond Magomedaliev on January 28, 2022, at Eagle FC 44. He lost by first-round technical knockout.

Njokuani faced Handesson Ferreira at Gamebred FC 4 in a bare-knuckle MMA bout on May 5, 2023, losing the bout after being submitted via rear-naked choke at the end of the first round.

Njokuani faced Brandon Jenkins at Gamebred FC 5 on September 8, 2023. He won the fight by unanimous decision.

Njokuani faced Jesse Ronson at Gamebred Bareknuckle MMA 7 on March 2, 2024. Njokuani lost by a kimura submission in the first round.

== Championships and accomplishments ==
=== Kickboxing ===
- Kansas State Kickboxing
  - Kansas State Muay Thai Champion

=== Mixed Martial Arts ===
- Art of War
  - Art of War Lightweight Championship
- Ultimate Fighting Championship
  - Fight of the Night (One time) vs. Edson Barboza
  - UFC.com Awards
    - 2011: Ranked #10 Fight of the Year vs. Edson Barboza
- World Extreme Cagefighting
  - Knockout of the Night (Three times) vs. Bart Palaszewski, Muhsin Corbbrey and Chris Horodecki
- Cagewriters
  - 2009 Breakthrough Fighter of the Year

== Mixed martial arts record ==
Professional record breakdown
35 matches	18 wins	16 losses
By knockout	10	2
By submission	0	7
By decision	8	7
No contests	1	

Res.	Record	Opponent	Method	Event	Date	Round	Time	Location	Notes
Loss	18–16 (1)	Rafael Alves	Submission (inverted hammerlock)	Gamebred Bareknuckle MMA 10	May 1, 2026	1	0:31	Miami, Florida, United States	Return to Lightweight. Gamebred FC Lightweight Grand Prix Round of 16.
Loss	18–15 (1)	Jesse Ronson	Submission (kimura)	Gamebred Bareknuckle MMA 7	March 2, 2024	1	4:26	Orlando, Florida, United States	
Win	18–14 (1)	Brandon Jenkins	Decision (unanimous)	Gamebred Bareknuckle MMA 5	September 8, 2023	3	5:00	Jacksonville, Florida, United States	Catchweight (165 lb) bout.
Loss	17–14 (1)	Handesson Ferreira	Submission (rear-naked choke)	Gamebred Bareknuckle MMA 4	May 5, 2023	1	4:09	Fort Lauderdale, Florida, United States	
Loss	17–13 (1)	Raimond Magomedaliev	TKO (punches)	Eagle FC 44	January 28, 2022	1	2:49	Miami, Florida, United States	
Win	17–12 (1)	Wesley Golden	TKO (punches)	Gamebred Bareknuckle MMA 3	December 17, 2021	1	4:38	Biloxi, Mississippi, United States	Welterweight debut.
Loss	16–12 (1)	Leonardo Mafra	Decision (unanimous)	Final Fight Championship 25	June 11, 2016	3	5:00	Springfield, Massachusetts, United States	
Loss	16–11 (1)	Josh Quayhagen	Decision (split)	Legacy FC 42	June 26, 2015	3	5:00	Lake Charles, Louisiana, United States	
Loss	16–10 (1)	David Burrow	Submission (armbar)	Legacy FC 38	February 13, 2015	3	1:28	Allen, Texas, United States	
Loss	16–9 (1)	Daron Cruickshank	Decision (unanimous)	UFC Fight Night: MacDonald vs. Saffiedine	October 4, 2014	3	5:00	Halifax, Nova Scotia, Canada	
Loss	16–8 (1)	Vinc Pichel	Decision (unanimous)	UFC 173	May 24, 2014	3	5:00	Las Vegas, Nevada, United States	
Win	16–7 (1)	Roger Bowling	KO (punch)	UFC on Fox: Henderson vs. Melendez	April 20, 2013	2	2:52	San Jose, California, United States	
Loss	15–7 (1)	Rafael dos Anjos	Decision (unanimous)	UFC on Fuel TV: Munoz vs. Weidman	July 11, 2012	3	5:00	San Jose, California, United States	
Win	15–6 (1)	John Makdessi	Decision (unanimous)	UFC 145	April 21, 2012	3	5:00	Atlanta, Georgia, United States	Catchweight (158 lb) bout; Makdessi missed weight.
Loss	14–6 (1)	Danny Castillo	Decision (split)	UFC 141	December 30, 2011	3	5:00	Las Vegas, Nevada, United States	
Win	14–5 (1)	Andre Winner	Decision (unanimous)	UFC 132	July 2, 2011	3	5:00	Las Vegas, Nevada, United States	
Loss	13–5 (1)	Edson Barboza	Decision (unanimous)	UFC 128	March 19, 2011	3	5:00	Newark, New Jersey, United States	Fight of the Night.
Win	13–4 (1)	Edward Faaloloto	TKO (elbow)	WEC 52	November 11, 2010	2	4:54	Las Vegas, Nevada, United States	
Loss	12–4 (1)	Maciej Jewtuszko	TKO (punches)	WEC 50	August 18, 2010	1	1:36	Las Vegas, Nevada, United States	
Loss	12–3 (1)	Shane Roller	Submission (rear-naked choke)	WEC 48	April 24, 2010	1	3:21	Sacramento, California, United States	
Win	12–2 (1)	Chris Horodecki	TKO (head kick and punches)	WEC 45	December 19, 2009	1	3:33	Las Vegas, Nevada, United States	Knockout of the Night.
Win	11–2 (1)	Muhsin Corbbrey	TKO (punches)	WEC 43	October 10, 2009	2	1:42	San Antonio, Texas, United States	Knockout of the Night.
Win	10–2 (1)	Bart Palaszewski	TKO (punches)	WEC 40	April 5, 2009	2	0:27	Chicago, Illinois, United States	Knockout of the Night.
Loss	9–2 (1)	Benson Henderson	Submission (guillotine choke)	WEC 38	January 25, 2009	2	0:42	San Diego, California, United States	
Win	9–1 (1)	Aaron Williams	TKO (knees)	Supreme Warrior Championship 1	September 19, 2008	1	2:28	Garland, Texas, United States	
Win	8–1 (1)	Keyon Mike Jackson	KO (knee)	Art of War 3	September 1, 2007	1	2:14	Dallas, Texas, United States	
Loss	7–1 (1)	Donald Cerrone	Submission (triangle choke)	Ring of Fire 29	April 28, 2007	1	4:30	Broomfield, Colorado, United States	
Win	7–0 (1)	Kenneth Rosfort-Nees	KO (punch)	Art of War 1	March 9, 2007	1	2:12	Dallas, Texas, United States	
Win	6–0 (1)	Jason Palacios	Decision (unanimous)	Lonestar Beatdown 1	November 10, 2006	3	3:00	College Station, Texas, United States	
Win	5–0 (1)	Steven Bratland	Decision (unanimous)	Ultimate Texas Showdown 6	June 26, 2006	3	5:00	Frisco, Texas, United States	
Win	4–0 (1)	Ira Boyd	Decision (unanimous)	Ultimate Texas Showdown 5	April 29, 2006	3	5:00	Frisco, Texas, United States	
Win	3–0 (1)	Devon Miller	KO (punches)	Ultimate Texas Showdown 4	February 25, 2006	2	0:55	Frisco, Texas, United States	
Win	2–0 (1)	Ben Dauck	Decision (unanimous)	Inferno Promotions: Meltdown	July 22, 2005	3	5:00	Plano, Texas, United States	
NC	1–0 (1)	James Martinez	NC (premature stoppage)	Venom: First Strike	September 18, 2004	1	2:47	Huntington Beach, California, United States	
Win	1–0	Lee King	Decision (unanimous)	Renegades Extreme Fighting: Austin Fights	May 3, 2003	3	5:00	Austin, Texas, United States	Lightweight debut.

== Kickboxing record ==
Professional Kickboxing record
25 wins, 3 losses, 0 draws, 0 no contests
Date	Result	Opponent	Event	Location	Method	Round	Time
2019-10-28	Win	(Australia) Elliot Compton	ONE Hero Series October	Beijing, China	Decision (Unanimous)	3	3:00
2019-02-22	Loss	(Suriname) Regian Eersel	ONE Championship: Call to Greatness	Kallang, Singapore	KO (punches)	2	1:03
2018-10-06	Win	(Netherlands) Andy Souwer	ONE Championship: Kingdom of Heroes	Bangkok, Thailand	Decision (split)	3	3:00
2017-09-29	Loss	(United Kingdom) Liam Nolan	Triumphant I Muay Thai Series 1	Rohnert Park, California, United States	Decision (Split)	5	3:00
For the WMC Intercontinental -160 lbs title.
2017-02-03	Win	(Australia) Chris Harrington	Lion Fight 34	Las Vegas, Nevada	TKO (3 knockdowns)	3	2:44
2008-06-07	Win	(United States) Thad Campbell	World Combat League	New York, New York, United States	Decision (15-9)	1	3:00
2008-06-07	Win	(United States) Bryan Corley	World Combat League	Austin, Texas	KO (punches)	1	
2007-10-19	Loss	(United States) Kurt Halsey	World Combat League	Oklahoma, United States	Decision (17-11)	1	3:00
Legend: Win Loss Draw/No contest Notes
