= Erik Koch =

American mixed martial arts fighter (born 1988)

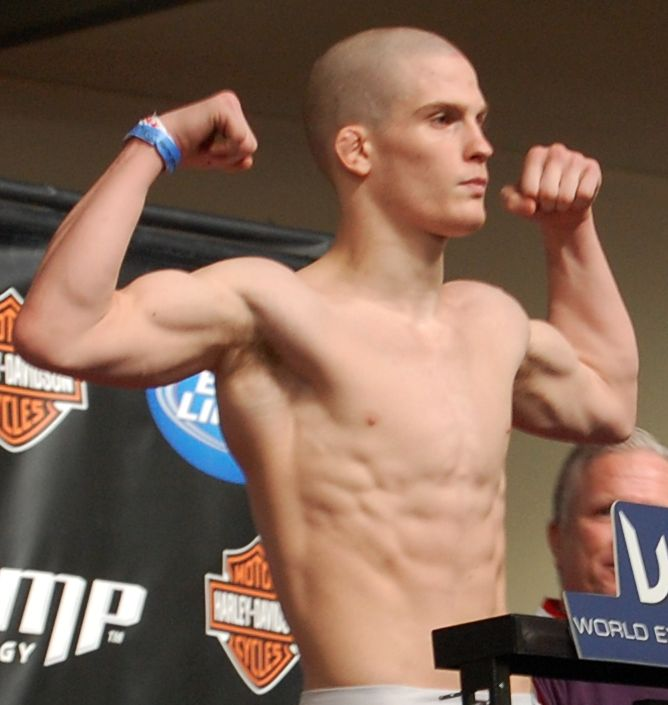
- Born: October 4, 1988 (age 38); Cedar Rapids, Iowa, United States
- Other names: The Phoenix
- Height: 5 ft 10 in (1.78 m)
- Weight: 170 lb (77 kg; 12 st)
- Division: Welterweight; Lightweight; Featherweight
- Reach: 71 1/2 in (182 cm)
- Stance: Southpaw
- Fighting out of: Milwaukee, Wisconsin, United States
- Team: Roufusport
- Rank: Black belt in Taekwondo
- Years active: 2007–present

Mixed martial arts record
- Total: 22
- Wins: 16
- By knockout: 4
- By submission: 8
- By decision: 4
- Losses: 6
- By knockout: 2
- By decision: 4

Other information
- Mixed martial arts record from Sherdog

Erik Jon Koch (born October 4, 1988) is an American mixed martial artist who last competed in the Welterweight division of the Ultimate Fighting Championship. A professional competitor since 2007, he formerly competed for the WEC.

== Background ==
Koch was enrolled in Tae Kwon Do classes at the age of four, and reached his black belt by the age of ten, piquing his interest in MMA. With help from his older brother, Keoni, who helps run an MMA gym in Iowa with Dave Sherzer (Hard Drive MMA), Erik started MMA-style striking and grappling before the age of 14. Koch would later drop out of Washington High School (Cedar Rapids, Iowa) to pursue a professional career in mixed martial arts.

== Mixed martial arts career ==
=== Early career ===
After compiling a 2–0 amateur record, Koch made his professional MMA debut in 2007. Fighting primarily in Iowa, he amassed an undefeated streak of 8–0 before being signed to World Extreme Cagefighting.

=== World Extreme Cagefighting ===
Koch was scheduled to fight Wagnney Fabiano at WEC 43 on September 2, 2009, but was forced to withdraw from the bout due to an undisclosed injury while training. Koch was replaced by WEC newcomer Mackens Semerzier. Now Koch made his WEC debut against Jameel Massouh on December 19 for WEC 45. Koch defeated Massouh via unanimous decision.

Koch was defeated by WEC newcomer Chad Mendes via unanimous decision on March 6, 2010, at WEC 47.

Koch rebounded from his first professional loss as he faced Bendy Casimir on June 20, 2010, at WEC 49. Koch won via first-round triangle choke submission.

Koch was expected to face Josh Grispi on November 11, 2010, at WEC 52. However, due to the UFC/WEC merger, the fight was scratched as Grispi was awarded a title fight with current WEC Featherweight Champion José Aldo to determine the inaugural UFC Featherweight Champion. Koch defeated promotional newcomer Francisco Rivera via first-round TKO, earning Knockout of the Night honors.

=== Ultimate Fighting Championship ===
==== 2011 ====
On October 28, 2010, World Extreme Cagefighting merged with the Ultimate Fighting Championship. As part of the merger, all WEC fighters were transferred to the UFC.

Koch was expected to face Cub Swanson on March 3, 2011, at UFC Live: Sanchez vs. Kampmann. However Swanson was forced out of the bout with an injury.

Koch faced Raphael Assunção at UFC 128, replacing the injured Manvel Gamburyan. He won the fight via first round knockout, earning Knockout of the Night honors.

Koch was expected to face Cub Swanson on July 2, 2011, at UFC 132. However, Swanson was forced out of the bout with another injury.

Koch faced The Ultimate Fighter 12 winner Jonathan Brookins on September 17, 2011, at UFC Fight Night 25. He won the fight via unanimous decision.

==== 2012 ====
Koch was expected to face Dustin Poirier on February 4, 2012, at UFC 143. However, Koch pulled out of the bout citing an injury and was replaced by Ricardo Lamas, who was then replaced by Max Holloway due to injury as well.

Koch was expected to face José Aldo for the UFC Featherweight Championship on July 21, 2012, at UFC 149. However, Aldo was forced out of the bout citing an injury and the bout was postponed.

Koch was expected to face José Aldo on October 13, 2012, at UFC 153 for the UFC Featherweight Championship. However, Koch was forced out of the bout with another injury and replaced by Frankie Edgar.

==== 2013 ====
Koch faced Ricardo Lamas on January 26, 2013, at UFC on Fox 6. He lost via TKO in the second round.

Koch faced Dustin Poirier on August 31, 2013, at UFC 164. He lost the fight via unanimous decision.

==== 2014 ====
After two consecutive losses, Koch returned to lightweight and faced Rafaello Oliveira on February 22, 2014, at UFC 170. He won the fight by TKO in the first round.

Koch faced Daron Cruickshank on May 10, 2014, at UFC Fight Night 40. He lost the fight via TKO due to a head kick and punches in the first round.

==== 2015 ====
Koch was expected to face Ramsey Nijem on July 25, 2015, at UFC on Fox 16. However, Koch was forced from the bout with injury and replaced by promotional newcomer Andrew Holbrook.

==== 2016 ====
Koch was expected to face Drew Dober on January 2, 2016, at UFC 195. However, Koch pulled out of the bout in early December citing another injury and was replaced by Scott Holtzman.

Koch was expected to face Joe Proctor on May 29, 2016, at UFC Fight Night 88. However, Proctor pulled out of the fight on April 21 citing injury and was replaced by Shane Campbell. Koch won the fight via submission in the second round.

A rescheduled bout with Drew Dober was expected to take place on September 10, 2016, at UFC 203. However on August 11, Koch pulled out again due to injury and was replaced by promotional newcomer Jason Gonzalez.

==== 2017 ====
Koch was expected to face Tony Martin on January 15, 2017, at UFC Fight Night 103. However, Koch pulled out of the fight on December 12 with yet another injury and was replaced by Alex White.

Koch faced Clay Guida on June 25, 2017, at UFC Fight Night 112. He lost the fight by unanimous decision.

==== 2018 ====
Koch faced Bobby Green on January 27, 2018, at UFC on Fox: Jacaré vs. Brunson 2. He lost the fight via unanimous decision.

Koch was scheduled to face promotional newcomer Dwight Grant in a welterweight bout on December 15, 2018, at UFC on Fox 31. However, Koch was removed from the card on November 28 for undisclosed reasons and replaced by Zak Ottow.

==== 2019 ====
Koch faced Kyle Stewart on July 27, 2019, at UFC 240 in a welterweight bout. He won the fight via unanimous decision.

==== 2020 ====
On December 23, 2020, it was reported that Koch was released by the UFC.

Koch was suspended by USADA for 18 months for testing positive for 3'-hydroxy-stanozolol, a metabolite of stanozolol, as the result of a urine sample collected on October 3, 2020. He became eligible to return on April 3, 2022.

== Championships and accomplishments ==
- World Extreme Cagefighting
  - Knockout of the Night (One time) vs. Francisco Rivera
- Ultimate Fighting Championship
  - Knockout of the Night (One time) vs. Raphael Assunção
- Mainstream MMA
  - Mainstream MMA Lightweight Championship (2008)
- Midwest Cage Championship
  - MCC 20 Featherweight Tournament Winner (2009)

== Mixed martial arts record ==
Professional record breakdown
22 matches	16 wins	6 losses
By knockout	4	2
By submission	8	0
By decision	4	4

Res.	Record	Opponent	Method	Event	Date	Round	Time	Location	Notes
Win	16–6	Kyle Stewart	Decision (unanimous)	UFC 240	July 27, 2019	3	5:00	Edmonton, Alberta, Canada	Welterweight debut.
Loss	15–6	Bobby Green	Decision (unanimous)	UFC on Fox: Jacaré vs. Brunson 2	January 27, 2018	3	5:00	Charlotte, North Carolina, United States	
Loss	15–5	Clay Guida	Decision (unanimous)	UFC Fight Night: Chiesa vs. Lee	June 25, 2017	3	5:00	Oklahoma City, Oklahoma, United States	
Win	15–4	Shane Campbell	Submission (rear-naked choke)	UFC Fight Night: Almeida vs. Garbrandt	May 29, 2016	2	3:02	Las Vegas, Nevada, United States	
Loss	14–4	Daron Cruickshank	TKO (head kick and punches)	UFC Fight Night: Brown vs. Silva	May 10, 2014	1	3:21	Cincinnati, Ohio, United States	
Win	14–3	Rafaello Oliveira	TKO (punches)	UFC 170	February 22, 2014	1	1:24	Las Vegas, Nevada, United States	Return to Lightweight.
Loss	13–3	Dustin Poirier	Decision (unanimous)	UFC 164	August 31, 2013	3	5:00	Milwaukee, Wisconsin, United States	
Loss	13–2	Ricardo Lamas	TKO (elbows)	UFC on Fox: Johnson vs. Dodson	January 26, 2013	2	2:32	Chicago, Illinois, United States	
Win	13–1	Jonathan Brookins	Decision (unanimous)	UFC Fight Night: Shields vs. Ellenberger	September 17, 2011	3	5:00	New Orleans, Louisiana, United States	
Win	12–1	Raphael Assunção	KO (punch)	UFC 128	March 19, 2011	1	2:32	Newark, New Jersey, United States	Knockout of the Night.
Win	11–1	Francisco Rivera	TKO (head kick and punches)	WEC 52	November 11, 2010	1	1:36	Las Vegas, Nevada, United States	Knockout of the Night.
Win	10–1	Bendy Casimir	Submission (triangle choke)	WEC 49	June 20, 2010	1	3:01	Edmonton, Alberta, Canada	
Loss	9–1	Chad Mendes	Decision (unanimous)	WEC 47	March 6, 2010	3	5:00	Columbus, Ohio, United States	
Win	9–0	Jameel Massouh	Decision (unanimous)	WEC 45	December 19, 2009	3	5:00	Las Vegas, Nevada, United States	
Win	8–0	Tom Ahrens	Submission (rear-naked choke)	Midwest Cage Championships 20	April 17, 2009	2	3:13	West Des Moines, Iowa, United States	Won the MCC 20 Featherweight Tournament.
Win	7–0	Will Shutt	Submission (rear-naked choke)	Midwest Cage Championships 20	April 17, 2009	2	3:33	West Des Moines, Iowa, United States	Featherweight debut.
Win	6–0	Joe Pearson	Submission (triangle choke)	Mainstream MMA 9: New Era	April 8, 2008	1	3:00	Cedar Rapids, Iowa, United States	Won the Mainstream MMA Lightweight Championship.
Win	5–0	Eric Wisely	Decision (unanimous)	Mainstream MMA 7: Vengeance	October 20, 2007	3	5:00	Cedar Rapids, Iowa, United States	
Win	4–0	TJ O'Brien	Submission (armbar)	Mainstream MMA 6: Evolution	July 14, 2007	1	0:42	Dubuque, Iowa, United States	
Win	3–0	Tyler Combs	TKO (punches)	Xtreme Fighting Organization 17	June 2, 2007	1	2:37	Crystal Lake, Illinois, United States	
Win	2–0	Micah Washington	Submission (armbar)	Mainstream MMA 5: Heavy Duty	February 10, 2007	1	N/A	Cedar Rapids, Iowa, United States	
Win	1–0	Prentiss Wolf	Submission (rear-naked choke)	Mainstream MMA 4: Epic	January 6, 2007	1	2:30	Cedar Rapids, Iowa, United States	

== See also ==
- List of male mixed martial artists
