= WEC 50 =

WEC MMA event in 2010

WEC 50: Cruz vs. Benavidez 2
- The poster for WEC 50: Cruz vs. Benavidez 2
- Promotion: World Extreme Cagefighting
- Date: August 18, 2010
- Venue: The Pearl at The Palms
- City: Paradise, Nevada, United States
- Attendance: 1,861
- Total gate: $275,340

Event chronology
WEC 49: Varner vs. Shalorus	WEC 50: Cruz vs. Benavidez 2	WEC 51: Aldo vs. Gamburyan

WEC 50: Cruz vs. Benavidez 2 was a mixed martial arts event held by World Extreme Cagefighting that took place on August 18, 2010 at The Pearl at The Palms in Las Vegas.

== Background ==
This event marked WEC's first visit to Las Vegas since WEC 45 in December 2009 and was also shown on the TV channel Versus.

Urijah Faber was expected to make his bantamweight debut against Japanese striker Takeya Mizugaki. However, Faber was forced off the card with an injury. As a result, Mizugaki was also pulled from the event. The Faber/Mizugaki bout was simply pushed back, to WEC 52. Faber won the rescheduled matchup by first round submission.

Stephan Bonnar served as color commentator for the event along with Todd Harris.

The event drew an average of 316,000 TV viewers.

== Results ==
Main card
Weight class				Method	Round	Time	Notes
Bantamweight	Dominick Cruz (c)	def	Joseph Benavidez	Decision (split) (47–48, 48–47, 49–46)	5	5:00	(Note: For the WEC Bantamweight Championship.)
Lightweight	Anthony Pettis	def	Shane Roller	Submission (triangle choke)	3	4:51
Featherweight	Chad Mendes	def	Cub Swanson	Decision (unanimous) (30–27, 29–28, 29–28)	3	5:00
Bantamweight	Scott Jorgensen	def	Brad Pickett	Decision (unanimous) (30–27, 30–27, 30–27)	3	5:00
Lightweight	Bart Palaszewski	def	Zach Micklewright	KO (punches)	2	0:31
Preliminary card
Lightweight	Maciej Jewtuszko	def	Anthony Njokuani	TKO (punches)	1	1:35
Featherweight	Javier Vazquez	def	Mackens Semerzier	Submission (rear-naked choke)	2	1:35
Lightweight	Ricardo Lamas	def	Dave Jansen	Decision (unanimous) (29–28, 29–28, 29–28)	3	5:00
Featherweight	Fredson Paixão	def	Bryan Caraway	Decision (split) (28–29, 29–28, 29–28)	3	5:00
Lightweight	Danny Castillo	def	Dustin Poirier	Decision (unanimous) (30–27, 29–28, 30–27)	3	5:00

== Bonus Awards ==
Fighters were awarded $10,000 bonuses.

- Fight of the Night: Scott Jorgensen vs. Brad Pickett
- Knockout of the Night: Maciej Jewtuszko
- Submission of the Night: Anthony Pettis

== Reported payout ==
The following is the reported payout to the fighters as reported to the Nevada State Athletic Commission. It does not include sponsor money or "locker room" bonuses often given by the WEC and also do not include the WEC's traditional "fight night" bonuses.

- Dominick Cruz: $22,000 (includes $11,000 win bonus) def. Joseph Benavidez: $17,500
- Anthony Pettis: $12,000 ($6,000 win bonus) def. Shane Roller: $16,000
- Chad Mendes: $11,000 ($5,500 win bonus) def. Cub Swanson: $11,000
- Scott Jorgensen: $25,000 ($12,500 win bonus) def. Brad Pickett: $5,000
- Bart Palaszewski: $16,000 ($8,000 win bonus) def. Zach Micklewright: $3,000
- Javier Vazquez: $16,000 ($8,000 win bonus) def. Mackens Semerzier: $4,000
- Maciej Jewtuszko: $6,000 ($3,000 win bonus) def. Anthony Njokuani: $7,000
- Ricardo Lamas: $14,000 ($7,000 win bonus) def. Dave Jansen: $4,000
- Fredson Paixão: $6,000 ($3,000 win bonus) def. Bryan Caraway: $4,000
- Danny Castillo: $19,000 ($9,500 win bonus) def. Dustin Poirier: $3,000

== See also ==
- World Extreme Cagefighting
- List of World Extreme Cagefighting champions
- List of WEC events
- 2010 in WEC
