= Ricardo Lamas =

American mixed martial artist (born 1982)

- Born: May 21, 1982 (age 44); Chicago, Illinois, U.S.
- Nickname: The Bully
- Height: 5 ft 8 in (1.73 m)
- Weight: 145 lb (66 kg; 10.4 st)
- Division: Featherweight; Lightweight
- Reach: 71 in (180 cm)
- Fighting out of: Miami, Florida, U.S.
- Team: MMA Masters (2009–2020); UFC Gym Naperville (2018–present)
- Rank: Black belt in Brazilian Jiu-Jitsu under Daniel Valverde
- Wrestling: NCAA Division III Wrestling
- Years active: 2008–2020

Mixed martial arts record
- Total: 28
- Wins: 20
- By knockout: 6
- By submission: 5
- By decision: 9
- Losses: 8
- By knockout: 5
- By decision: 3

Other information
- University: Elmhurst College
- Notable school: Hinsdale Central High School
- Mixed martial arts record from Sherdog

Ricardo Lamas (born May 21, 1982) is an American former professional mixed martial artist best known for competing in the Featherweight division of the Ultimate Fighting Championship (UFC) and the Lightweight division of the World Extreme Cagefighting (WEC). During his tenure with the UFC, he contended for the UFC Featherweight Championship once.

== Background ==
Ricardo Lamas was born in Chicago, Illinois to a Cuban father and a Mexican American mother. The flags of his respective parents' birth countries are often displayed on his fight trunks. His father was the leader of a Cuban resistance movement under the Castro regime, eventually managing to hide in the Brazilian embassy in Cuba before escaping to the United States, where he settled ever since.

Lamas has five older brothers. He went to Hinsdale Central High School in Hinsdale, Illinois, where he wrestled. He then attended Elmhurst College in 2001, where he was a member of the men's wrestling team and earned All-American honors at the NCAA Division III Men's Wrestling Championships at 157 lbs. During his four-year collegiate career, he racked up over 100 wins, became a two-time CCIW Champion, and was named the CCIW's "Most Outstanding Wrestler" during the 2003–04 season. Lamas graduated from Elmhurst College in 2005 with a degree in sports science, and would return to his alma mater to serve as the assistant men's wrestling coach.

== Mixed martial arts career ==
=== ISCF - International Sport Combat Federation ===
Lamas won the ISCF North Central Regional Title on April 26, 2008, in Loves Park, Illinois, US when he defeated Cal Ferry via Guillotine Choke at 4:50 of round 4.

=== World Extreme Cagefighting ===
Lamas made his WEC debut on March 1, 2009, at WEC 39 against IFL and WEC veteran Bart Palaszewski. Lamas took the fight with 4 days notice as he replaced an injured Rich Crunkilton. Lamas controlled Palaszewski with superior wrestling and scored with excellent ground-and-pound to win a unanimous decision.

Lamas faced Danny Castillo on August 9, 2009, at WEC 42. Lamas suffered his first defeat as Castillo won the fight via second-round TKO.

Lamas next faced James Krause on November 18, 2009, at WEC 44. Lamas won the fight via unanimous decision.

Lamas then faced Bendy Casimir on March 6, 2010, at WEC 47. He won the fight in stunning fashion by defeating Casimir via flying knee KO in the first round.

Lamas defeated Dave Jansen via unanimous decision on August 18, 2010, at WEC 50.

Lamas was expected to face Maciej Jewtuszko on December 16, 2010, at WEC 53, but Jewtuszko had to withdraw as he suffered a broken hand during training. Lamas instead faced Iuri Alcântara and lost via KO in the first round.

=== Ultimate Fighting Championship ===
In October 2010, World Extreme Cagefighting merged with the Ultimate Fighting Championship. As part of the merger, all WEC fighters were transferred to the UFC.

In his UFC debut, Lamas faced returning UFC veteran Matt Grice in a featherweight bout on June 26, 2011, at UFC on Versus 4. Lamas defeated Grice via TKO in the first round.

Lamas faced Cub Swanson on November 12, 2011, at UFC on Fox 1. Lamas won via second round submission after applying an arm-triangle choke, earning Submission of the Night honors.

Lamas was expected to face Dustin Poirier on February 4, 2012, at UFC 143, replacing an injured Erik Koch However, Lamas ended up injured as well and was replaced by Max Holloway.

For his third UFC fight at featherweight, Lamas faced Hatsu Hioki on June 22, 2012, at UFC on FX: Maynard vs. Guida. He won the fight via unanimous decision by outmatching and overpowering the heavily favored Hioki.

Lamas was briefly linked to a December 2012 bout with Frankie Edgar, however the pairing was scrapped after Edgar was tabbed as a replacement for the injured Erik Koch and face José Aldo for the UFC Featherweight Championship at UFC 153.

Lamas faced Erik Koch on January 26, 2013, at UFC on Fox 6. Lamas won via TKO in the second round.

Lamas was expected to face Chan Sung Jung on July 6, 2013, at UFC 162. However, on June 14, it was announced that Jung had been pulled from the bout and would replace an injured Anthony Pettis to face José Aldo for the UFC Featherweight Championship on August 3, 2013, at UFC 163. As a result, Lamas was pulled from the event.

Lamas faced UFC Featherweight Champion José Aldo for the title on February 1, 2014, as the co-main event of UFC 169. It was revealed during the UFC countdown show that Lamas received his black belt in Brazilian jiu-jitsu during his training camp leading up to the bout. Lamas lost the fight via unanimous decision.

Lamas faced Hacran Dias on June 28, 2014, at UFC Fight Night 44. Lamas won the fight by unanimous decision.

Lamas faced Dennis Bermudez on November 15, 2014, at UFC 180. After dropping Bermudez with a jab, Lamas was able to secure a guillotine choke and earn the first round submission victory.

Lamas faced Chad Mendes on April 4, 2015, in the main event at UFC Fight Night 63. Mendes won the fight via TKO in the first round.

Lamas faced Diego Sanchez on November 21, 2015, at The Ultimate Fighter Latin America 2 Finale. He won the fight by unanimous decision.

Lamas next faced Max Holloway on June 4, 2016, at UFC 199. He lost the back and forth fight via unanimous decision.

Lamas was scheduled to face returning veteran B.J. Penn on October 15, 2016, at UFC Fight Night 97. However, on October 4, Penn pulled out of the fight citing an injury. In turn, the promotion announced on October 6 that they had cancelled the event entirely.

Lamas was quickly rescheduled and returned to face Charles Oliveira on November 5, 2016, at The Ultimate Fighter Latin America 3 Finale. The bout was contested at a catchweight of 155 lbs, as Oliveira missed weight by nearly 10 lbs. Lamas won the fight via submission in the second round and was awarded a Performance of the Night bonus.

Lamas was expected to face Chan Sung Jung on July 29, 2017, at UFC 214. However Jung pulled out of the fight in early June citing a knee injury. He was replaced by Jason Knight. Lamas won the fight by first-round TKO.

Lamas was scheduled to face José Aldo on December 16, 2017, at UFC on Fox: Lawler vs. dos Anjos. However, Aldo was pulled from the bout in favour of a rematch with Max Holloway two weeks earlier at UFC 218, replacing an injured Frankie Edgar. Lamas instead faced Josh Emmett. At the weigh ins, Emmett weighed in at 148.5 pounds, 2.5 pounds over the featherweight upper limit of 146 pounds and the bout proceeded at a catchweight. Emmett forfeited 20% of his purse to Lamas. Lamas lost the fight via knockout in the first round.

Lamas faced Mirsad Bektić on June 9, 2018, at UFC 225. He lost the fight by split decision.

Lamas faced Darren Elkins on November 17, 2018, at UFC Fight Night 140. He won the fight via TKO in the third round. Shortly after the fight, Lamas revealed in a social media post that he had been fighting with a blood clot in his left leg and that he got blood thinning medication for the condition.

Lamas faced Calvin Kattar at UFC 238 on June 8, 2019. He lost the fight via knockout in the first round.

Lamas was scheduled to face Ryan Hall on May 2, 2020, at UFC Fight Night: Hermansson vs. Weidman. However, on April 9, Dana White, the president of UFC announced that this event was postponed to a future date. The bout was rescheduled on August 29, 2020, at UFC Fight Night 175. However, Hall pulled out of the bout due to an undisclosed injury. Lamas instead faced promotional newcomer Bill Algeo. He won the fight via unanimous decision. This fight earned him the Fight of the Night award. Lamas confirmed his intention to retire from professional competition after the win over Algeo.

== Fighting style ==
Lamas nickname, "The Bully", comes from his physical presence and fighting style, where he roughs up his opponents and overpowers them, which comes from his amateur wrestling background, in addition to having strong Brazilian jiu-jitsu skills as well as a good striking game; the nickname was solidified during his fight with Hatsu Hioki. Despite being given said nickname, he abstains from trash talking. During the course of his MMA career, Lamas was never submitted.

== Personal life ==
Lamas and his wife Olivia have three children.

In June 2018, he opened a gym in Naperville, Illinois (part of the Chicago metropolitan area), which became affiliated with the UFC Gym.

During Lamas' time as an active competitor, he lived and trained in Miami, Florida. After retiring from active competition, he returned to Chicago.

== Championships and accomplishments ==
=== Amateur wrestling ===
- NCAA Division III All-American out of Elmhurst College (2005) NCAA Division III 157 lb: 6th place out of Elmhurst College (2005)
- CCIW two-time champion (2004–05) at 157 lb (out of Elmhurst College)

=== Mixed martial arts ===
- Ultimate Fighting Championship
  - Performance of the Night (One time) vs. Charles Oliveira
  - Submission of the Night (One time) vs. Cub Swanson
  - Fight of the Night (One time) vs. Bill Algeo
  - Tied (Brian Ortega & Joanderson Brito) for third most finishes in UFC Featherweight division history (7)
  - UFC.com Awards
    - 2012: Ranked #5 Upset of the Year vs. Hatsu Hioki
- International Sport Combat Federation
  - ISCF Lightweight Championship (One time)
- CBS Sports
  - 2016 #10 Ranked UFC Fight of the Year vs. Max Holloway

== Mixed martial arts record ==
Professional record breakdown
28 matches	20 wins	8 losses
By knockout	6	5
By submission	5	0
By decision	9	3

Res.	Record	Opponent	Method	Event	Date	Round	Time	Location	Notes
Win	20–8	Bill Algeo	Decision (unanimous)	UFC Fight Night: Smith vs. Rakić	August 29, 2020	3	5:00	Las Vegas, Nevada, United States	Fight of the Night.
Loss	19–8	Calvin Kattar	TKO (punches)	UFC 238	June 8, 2019	1	4:06	Chicago, Illinois, United States	
Win	19–7	Darren Elkins	TKO (punches and elbows)	UFC Fight Night: Magny vs. Ponzinibbio	November 17, 2018	3	4:09	Buenos Aires, Argentina	
Loss	18–7	Mirsad Bektić	Decision (split)	UFC 225	June 9, 2018	3	5:00	Chicago, Illinois, United States	
Loss	18–6	Josh Emmett	KO (punch)	UFC on Fox: Lawler vs. dos Anjos	December 16, 2017	1	4:33	Winnipeg, Manitoba, Canada	Catchweight (148.5 lb) bout; Emmett missed weight.
Win	18–5	Jason Knight	TKO (punches)	UFC 214	July 29, 2017	1	4:34	Anaheim, California, United States	
Win	17–5	Charles Oliveira	Submission (guillotine choke)	The Ultimate Fighter Latin America 3 Finale: dos Anjos vs. Ferguson	November 5, 2016	2	2:13	Mexico City, Mexico	Catchweight (155 lb) bout; Oliveira missed weight. Performance of the Night.
Loss	16–5	Max Holloway	Decision (unanimous)	UFC 199	June 4, 2016	3	5:00	Inglewood, California, United States	
Win	16–4	Diego Sanchez	Decision (unanimous)	The Ultimate Fighter Latin America 2 Finale: Magny vs. Gastelum	November 21, 2015	3	5:00	Monterrey, Mexico	
Loss	15–4	Chad Mendes	TKO (punches)	UFC Fight Night: Mendes vs. Lamas	April 4, 2015	1	2:45	Fairfax, Virginia, United States	
Win	15–3	Dennis Bermudez	Submission (guillotine choke)	UFC 180	November 15, 2014	1	3:18	Mexico City, Mexico	
Win	14–3	Hacran Dias	Decision (unanimous)	UFC Fight Night: Swanson vs. Stephens	June 28, 2014	3	5:00	San Antonio, Texas, United States	
Loss	13–3	José Aldo	Decision (unanimous)	UFC 169	February 1, 2014	5	5:00	Newark, New Jersey, United States	For the UFC Featherweight Championship.
Win	13–2	Erik Koch	TKO (elbows)	UFC on Fox: Johnson vs. Dodson	January 26, 2013	2	2:32	Chicago, Illinois, United States	
Win	12–2	Hatsu Hioki	Decision (unanimous)	UFC on FX: Maynard vs. Guida	June 22, 2012	3	5:00	Atlantic City, New Jersey, United States	
Win	11–2	Cub Swanson	Submission (arm-triangle choke)	UFC on Fox: Velasquez vs. dos Santos	November 12, 2011	2	2:16	Anaheim, California, United States	Submission of the Night.
Win	10–2	Matt Grice	TKO (head kick and punches)	UFC Live: Kongo vs. Barry	June 26, 2011	1	4:41	Pittsburgh, Pennsylvania, United States	Featherweight debut.
Loss	9–2	Iuri Alcântara	KO (punches)	WEC 53	December 16, 2010	1	3:26	Glendale, Arizona, United States	
Win	9–1	Dave Jansen	Decision (unanimous)	WEC 50	August 18, 2010	3	5:00	Las Vegas, Nevada, United States	
Win	8–1	Bendy Casimir	KO (flying knee)	WEC 47	March 6, 2010	1	3:43	Columbus, Ohio, United States	
Win	7–1	James Krause	Decision (unanimous)	WEC 44	November 18, 2009	3	5:00	Las Vegas, Nevada, United States	
Loss	6–1	Danny Castillo	TKO (punches)	WEC 42	August 9, 2009	2	4:15	Las Vegas, Nevada, United States	
Win	6–0	Bart Palaszewski	Decision (unanimous)	WEC 39	March 1, 2009	3	5:00	Corpus Christi, Texas, United States	
Win	5–0	Christopher Martins	Decision (unanimous)	IHC 12: Resurrection	November 8, 2008	3	5:00	Chicago, Illinois, United States	
Win	4–0	Gabe Miranda	TKO (punches)	Warriors Collide 6	October 4, 2008	1	3:16	Castle Rock, Colorado, United States	
Win	3–0	James Birdsley	Decision (unanimous)	Warriors Collide 4	July 19, 2008	2	5:00	Cripple Creek, Colorado, United States	
Win	2–0	Cal Ferry	Submission (guillotine choke)	ISCF: Rumble in the Park	April 26, 2008	4	4:50	Loves Park, Illinois, United States	Won the ISCF Lightweight Championship.
Win	1–0	Jake Corry	Submission (guillotine choke)	FCE: Collision	January 25, 2008	1	1:49	Northlake, Illinois, United States	

== See also ==
- List of current UFC fighters
- List of male mixed martial artists
