= LC Davis =

American mixed martial arts fighter

- Born: October 28, 1980 (age 45); Kansas City, Missouri, United States
- Height: 5 ft 8 in (1.73 m)
- Weight: 135 lb (61 kg; 9.6 st)
- Division: Bantamweight; Featherweight (formerly)
- Reach: 69 in (180 cm)
- Style: Freestyle wrestling, Kickboxing
- Fighting out of: Kansas City, Missouri, United States
- Team: SEK Elite Combat Academy
- Years active: 2006–2016

Mixed martial arts record
- Total: 31
- Wins: 23
- By knockout: 8
- By submission: 7
- By decision: 8
- Losses: 8
- By submission: 2
- By decision: 6

Other information
- Mixed martial arts record from Sherdog

La Carvas Rashad Davis (born October 28, 1980) is an American mixed martial artist who most recently competed in the Bantamweight division of Bellator MMA. A professional competitor since 2006, Davis has also formerly competed for the Quad Cities Silverbacks in the IFL, Affliction Entertainment, Titan FC, and the WEC.

== Early life and education ==
Born and raised in Kansas City, Missouri, Davis competed in high school wrestling and was talented, going on to continue his wrestling career at Labette Community College and Missouri Valley College. After graduating college, Davis began training in mixed martial arts.

== MMA career ==
Davis made his MMA debut in 2006, defeating Nick Wright in VFC 12. His professional MMA career has made him retire from a steady job as a wrestling coach at Pratt Community College, moving to the Quad Cities to train under Pat Miletich at his Mixed Martial School. He has competed for the Featherweight Grand Prix title, but there he suffered the first loss of his professional career, to Wagnney Fabiano.

In 2008, Davis was intended to debut in WEC 35 as a replacement to the injured Cub Swanson, who broke his hand at training. He was supposed to fight against Hiroyuki Takaya, but the fight was cancelled for unspecified reasons.

=== World Extreme Cagefighting ===
Davis made his WEC debut against fellow WEC newcomer Javier Vazquez on August 9, 2009 at WEC 42. He won via split decision.

He returned to the WEC only four months later, defeating previously unbeaten Diego Nunes via unanimous decision at WEC 44. A victory which was also considered a major upset, Nunes was a 3 to 1 favorite coming into the bout.

On March 6, 2010, Davis defeated Deividas Taurosevičius via majority decision at WEC 47, Thus solidifying his name as a top 10 contender in the WEC featherweight division.

In his fourth WEC outing, Davis fought top contender Josh Grispi at WEC 49. In the first round of the fight, Grispi sunk in a deep guillotine choke as Davis was shooting for a takedown. Grispi managed to choke Davis unconscious and was declared the winner via technical submission.

Davis looked to bounce back from his previous defeat by taking on Brazilian Jiu Jitsu black belt Raphael Assunção. The fight took place on November 11, 2010 at WEC 52. Davis lost via unanimous decision. For the first time in his WEC career Davis was the favorite coming into the fight.

After losing his second straight fight Davis was released from Zuffa following the UFC/WEC merger.

=== Independent promotions ===
In September 2008, Davis signed a year-long three-fight non-exclusive contract with Affliction, Davis made his Affliction debut on January 24, 2009 where he defeated journeyman Bao Quach by unanimous decision after a back and forth fight. His contract was later terminated after the company closed.

Davis has been announced as a participant in World Victory Road's Featherweight Grand Prix. In the first round of the tournament Davis was upset and thoroughly defeated by Michihiro Omigawa via unanimous decision.

After his release from the WEC, Davis returned home to Kansas City to work on his training where he eventually decided to drop down to the bantamweight division. Davis made his bantamweight debut on May 25, 2012 at Titan Fighting Championships 22 against Bill Kamery. Davis defeated Kamery in the second round via TKO putting him back in the win column for first time in over two years.

Davis defeated Jacob Akin on February 22, 2013, at Kansas City Fighting Alliance 5 via TKO due to punches in round one.

Davis defeated Dominic Blanco on March 30, 2013, at Victory Fighting Championship 39 via TKO due to a liver kick in round one.

Davis defeated James Saville on June 29, 2013, at GWC: The British Invasion via unanimous decision.

=== Bellator MMA ===
Davis made his debut with Bellator MMA on March 21, 2014 at Bellator 113. He faced Tory Bogguess and won via guillotine choke submission in the closing seconds of the first round.

Davis next faced promotional newcomer Zeilton Rodrigues at Bellator 124 on September 12, 2014. He won the fight via unanimous decision.

Davis faced Hideo Tokoro at Bellator 135 on March 27, 2015. He won the back-and-forth fight via split decision. He still went on to do the interview after he broke his jaw.

Davis faced the former Bellator Bantamweight Champion, Joe Warren in the main event of Bellator 143 on September 25, 2015. He lost the fight via unanimous decision.

On February 20, 2018 it was announced that Bellator had released Davis from the promotion.

Davis is currently teaching and coaching wrestling for Pittsburg High School. He has two sons and one daughter with wife, Kylie Shepard.

== Championships and accomplishments ==
- Victory Fighting Championship
  - VFC Bantamweight Championship (One time)
- Yahoo! Sports
  - 2015 Best Fight of the Half-Year vs. Hideo Tokoro

== Mixed martial arts record ==
Professional record breakdown
31 matches	23 wins	8 losses
By knockout	8	0
By submission	7	2
By decision	8	6

Res.	Record	Opponent	Method	Event	Date	Round	Time	Location	Notes
Loss	23–8	Marcos Galvão	Decision (split)	Bellator 166	December 2, 2016	3	5:00	Thackerville, Oklahoma, United States	
Loss	23–7	Joe Warren	Decision (unanimous)	Bellator 143	September 25, 2015	3	5:00	Hidalgo, Texas, United States	
Win	23–6	Hideo Tokoro	Decision (split)	Bellator 135	March 27, 2015	3	5:00	Thackerville, Oklahoma, United States	
Win	22–6	Zeilton Rodrigues	Decision (unanimous)	Bellator 124	September 12, 2014	3	5:00	Plymouth Township, Michigan, United States	
Win	21–6	Tory Bogguess	Submission (guillotine choke)	Bellator 113	March 21, 2014	1	4:58	Mulvane, Kansas, United States	
Loss	20–6	Ryan Roberts	Decision (split)	Victory Fighting Championship 41	December 14, 2013	5	5:00	Ralston, Nebraska, United States	Lost the VFC Bantamweight Championship.
Win	20–5	James Saville	Decision (unanimous)	GWC: The British Invasion: U.S. vs. U.K.	June 29, 2013	3	5:00	Kansas City, Missouri, United States	
Win	19–5	Dominic Blanco	TKO (liver kick)	Victory Fighting Championship 39	March 30, 2013	1	2:44	Omaha, Nebraska, United States	Won the VFC Bantamweight Championship.
Win	18–5	Jacob Akin	TKO (punches)	Kansas City Fighting Alliance 5	February 22, 2013	1	2:18	Kansas City, Kansas, United States	
Win	17–5	Bill Kamery	TKO (punches)	Titan FC 22	May 25, 2012	2	2:59	Kansas City, Kansas, United States	Bantamweight debut.
Loss	16–5	Christian Uflacker	Decision (split)	Hoosier Fight Club 10	February 11, 2012	3	5:00	Valparaiso, Indiana, United States	
Loss	16–4	Raphael Assunção	Decision (unanimous)	WEC 52	November 11, 2010	3	5:00	Las Vegas, Nevada, United States	
Loss	16–3	Josh Grispi	Technical Submission (guillotine choke)	WEC 49	June 20, 2010	1	2:33	Edmonton, Alberta, Canada	
Win	16–2	Deividas Taurosevičius	Decision (majority)	WEC 47	March 6, 2010	3	5:00	Columbus, Ohio, United States	
Win	15–2	Diego Nunes	Decision (unanimous)	WEC 44	November 18, 2009	3	5:00	Las Vegas, Nevada, United States	
Win	14–2	Javier Vazquez	Decision (split)	WEC 42	August 9, 2009	3	5:00	Las Vegas, Nevada, United States	
Loss	13–2	Michihiro Omigawa	Decision (unanimous)	World Victory Road Presents: Sengoku 7	March 20, 2009	3	5:00	Tokyo, Japan	
Win	13–1	Bao Quach	Decision (unanimous)	Affliction: Day of Reckoning	January 24, 2009	3	5:00	Anaheim, California, United States	
Win	12–1	Billy Kidd	Submission (bulldog choke)	Adrenaline MMA 2: Miletich vs. Denny	December 11, 2008	1	2:52	Moline, Illinois, United States	
Win	11–1	Josh Bernal	TKO (punches)	Conquest FC 1	September 27, 2008	1	4:07	Des Moines, Iowa, United States	
Win	10–1	Rafael Dias	KO (head kick)	IFL: New Jersey	April 4, 2008	3	3:56	East Rutherford, New Jersey, United States	
Loss	9–1	Wagnney Fabiano	Submission (armbar)	IFL: World Grand Prix Finals	December 19, 2007	1	3:38	Uncasville, Connecticut, United States	
Win	9–0	Conor Heun	Decision (split)	IFL: 2007 Semi-Finals	August 2, 2007	3	4:00	East Rutherford, New Jersey, United States	
Win	8–0	Dan Sullivan	TKO (punches)	Titan FC 8	July 27, 2007	1	3:18	Kansas City, Kansas, United States	
Win	7–0	Jay Estrada	Submission (guillotine choke)	IFC: Chicago	May 19, 2007	2	0:33	Chicago, Illinois, United States	
Win	6–0	George Henderson	TKO (submission to punches)	Titan FC 7	March 23, 2007	1	1:10	Kansas City, Kansas, United States	
Win	5–0	John T. Smith	TKO (punches)	Titan FC 6	July 24, 2007	1	0:36	Kansas City, Kansas, United States	
Win	4–0	Tim Gorman	Submission (guillotine choke)	Titan FC 5	August 4, 2006	1	2:52	Kansas City, Kansas, United States	
Win	3–0	Mike Lindquist	Submission (rear-naked choke)	Titan FC 4	June 9, 2006	1	1:13	Kansas City, Kansas, United States	
Win	2–0	Ace Anderson	TKO (submission to punches)	Titan FC 2	May 12, 2006	1	0:52	Topeka, Kansas, United States	
Win	1–0	Nick Wright	TKO (punches)	VFC 12: Warpath	February 25, 2006	2	N/A	Council Bluffs, Iowa, United States	

== See also ==
- List of male mixed martial artists
- List of current Bellator fighters
