= Bart Palaszewski =

Polish MMA fighter and BJJ practitioner

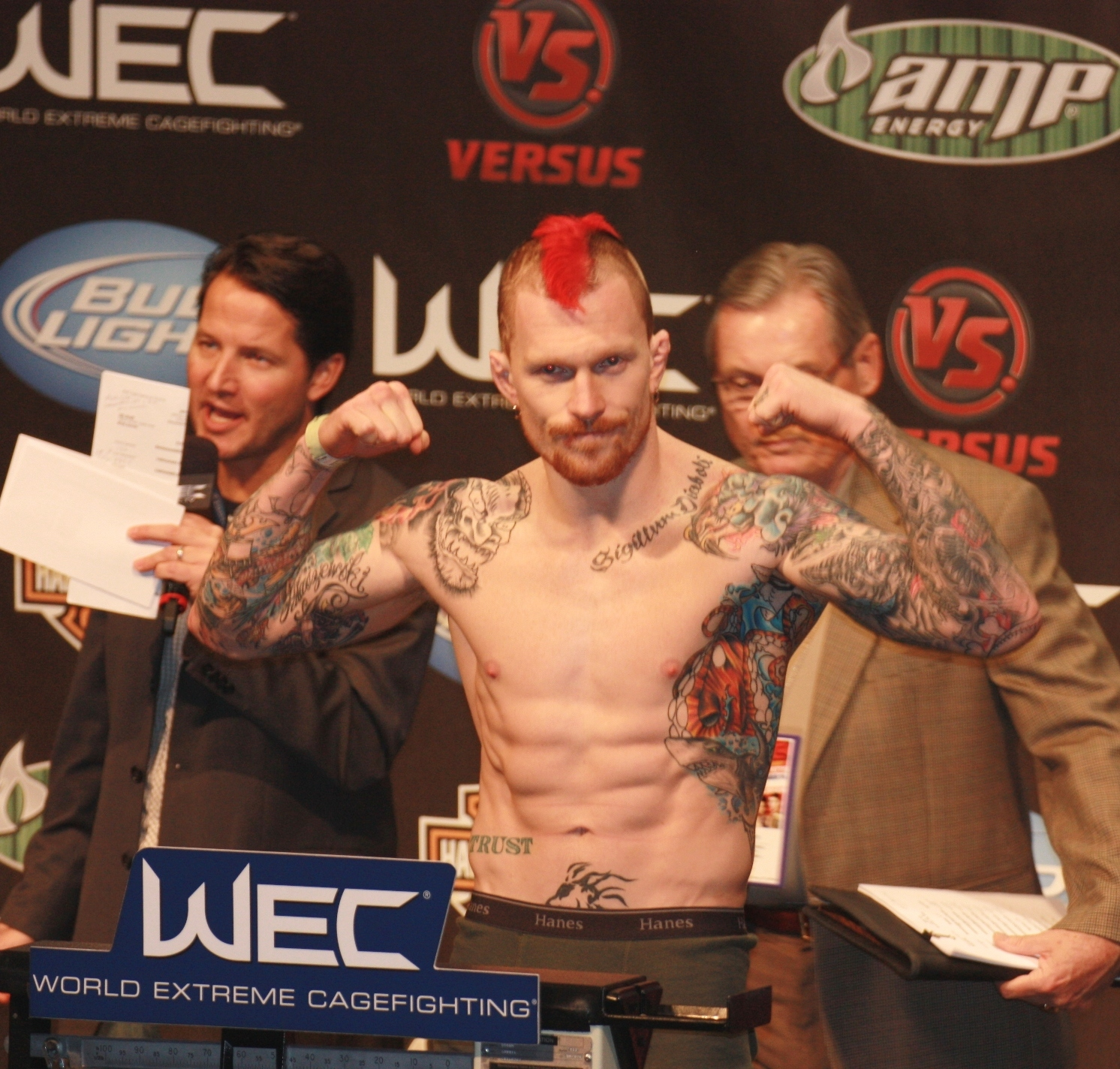
- Palaszewski at WEC 53 Weigh-Ins, December 2010.
- Born: May 30, 1983 (age 43); Warsaw, People's Republic of Poland, (today Poland)
- Other names: Bartimus
- Nationality: Polish-American
- Height: 5 ft 9 in (1.75 m)
- Weight: 145 lb (66 kg; 10 st 5 lb)
- Division: Lightweight; Featherweight; Welterweight
- Reach: 70 in (178 cm)
- Fighting out of: Wonder Lake, Illinois, United States
- Team: Team Curran
- Rank: Black belt in Brazilian Jiu-Jitsu
- Years active: 2002–2014

Mixed martial arts record
- Total: 53
- Wins: 36
- By knockout: 18
- By submission: 10
- By decision: 8
- Losses: 17
- By knockout: 2
- By submission: 3
- By decision: 12

Amateur record
- Total: 2
- Wins: 2
- By submission: 2

Other information
- Mixed martial arts record from Sherdog
- Last updated on: November 23, 2011

Bart K. Palaszewski (Polish pronunciation: [palaˈʂɛfskʲi]; born May 30, 1983) is a retired Polish-American professional mixed martial artist who most recently competed in the UFC's Featherweight division. A professional competitor from 2002 until 2014, Palaszewski has also formerly competed for the WEC, the Quad Cities Silverbacks of the IFL, and King of the Cage.

== Background ==
Palaszewski was born in Warsaw, Poland and lived there until he was 13 years old when he and his family immigrated to Wonder Lake, Illinois. In Poland, he was a "punching bag" for his older cousin who was involved in kickboxing, and Palaszewski also began judo when he was in the third grade. However, his coach became an Olympian and after Palaszewski was not happy with his old coach's replacement, he trained for six months in Brazilian jiu-jitsu and Muay Thai before being introduced to mixed martial arts. He trained whilst working as a photographer and graphic designer and holding other computer-related jobs. Then, after seeing his first MMA event at a show in McHenry, Illinois, Palaszewski was hooked. Although his official record indicates that he lost his first four professional fights, he claims that he had other wins professionally but only the four losses were documented when his coach sent in the results. Nevertheless, he then bounced back with eight consecutive victories.

== Mixed martial arts career ==
=== World Extreme Cagefighting ===
Palaszewski made his WEC debut against Alex Karalexis at WEC 37. He won the fight via second round TKO, earning Knockout of the Night honors.

Palaszewski suffered back to back losses against Ricardo Lamas via unanimous decision at WEC 39, and Anthony Njokuani via second round at WEC 40. The loss to Njokuani is to this date the only TKO/KO loss of his career.

Palaszewski fought touted prospect Anthony Pettis on December 19, 2009, at WEC 45. He gave Pettis his first professional loss via split decision.

Palaszewski defeated Karen Darabedyan via first round submission at WEC 47.

Palaszewski faced Zach Micklewright on August 18, 2010, at WEC 50. He won the fight via TKO in the second round.

Palaszewski was expected to face Kamal Shalorus on November 11, 2010, at WEC 52., but the bout was moved to WEC 53 after Shalorus suffered a hand injury. Palaszewski lost to Shalorus via a split decision.

=== Ultimate Fighting Championship ===
In October 2010, World Extreme Cagefighting merged with the Ultimate Fighting Championship. As part of the merger, most WEC fighters were transferred to the UFC.

Palaszewski was expected to face Cody McKenzie on May 28, 2011, at UFC 130. However, McKenzie was forced out of the bout with an injury and replaced by Gleison Tibau. Palaszewski himself was forced from the Tibau bout with an injury and replaced by Rafaello Oliveira.

Palaszewski returned to face Tyson Griffin in a featherweight bout on October 29, 2011, at UFC 137. Palaszewski won via first-round KO after dropping Griffin with a left hook and finishing the fight with a flurry of punches against the cage, earning Knockout of the Night honors.

Palaszewski faced Hatsu Hioki on February 26, 2012, at UFC 144. Hioki defeated Palaszewski via unanimous decision.

Palaszewski faced Diego Nunes on October 5, 2012, at UFC on FX 5., losing via unanimous decision (30-27, 29-28, 30-27). Despite the loss, he still earned the "Fight of the Night" bonus.

Palaszewski faced Cole Miller on April 13, 2013, at The Ultimate Fighter 17 Finale. Palaszewski lost the fight via submission in the first round and was subsequently released from the promotion.

On February in 2014, Palaszewski announced his retirement from mixed martial arts competition.

== Personal life ==
 [18]

== Championships and achievements ==
- Ultimate Fighting Championship
  - Knockout of the Night (One time) vs. Tyson Griffin
  - Fight of the Night (One time) vs. Diego Nunes
- World Extreme Cagefighting
  - Knockout of the Night (One time) vs. Alex Karalexis

== Mixed martial arts record ==
Professional record breakdown
53 matches	36 wins	17 losses
By knockout	18	2
By submission	10	3
By decision	8	12

Res.	Record	Opponent	Method	Event	Date	Round	Time	Location	Notes
Loss	36–17	Cole Miller	Submission (rear-naked choke)	The Ultimate Fighter 17 Finale	April 13, 2013	1	4:23	Las Vegas, Nevada, United States	
Loss	36–16	Diego Nunes	Decision (unanimous)	UFC on FX: Browne vs. Bigfoot	October 5, 2012	3	5:00	Minneapolis, Minnesota, United States	Fight of the Night.
Loss	36–15	Hatsu Hioki	Decision (unanimous)	UFC 144	February 26, 2012	3	5:00	Saitama, Saitama, Japan	
Win	36–14	Tyson Griffin	KO (punches)	UFC 137	October 29, 2011	1	2:45	Las Vegas, Nevada, United States	Catchweight (148 lbs) bout. Griffin missed weight. Knockout of the Night.
Loss	35–14	Kamal Shalorus	Decision (split)	WEC 53	December 16, 2010	3	5:00	Glendale, Arizona, United States	
Win	35–13	Zach Micklewright	KO (punch)	WEC 50	August 18, 2010	2	0:31	Las Vegas, Nevada, United States	
Win	34–13	Karen Darabedyan	Submission (armbar)	WEC 47	March 6, 2010	1	4:40	Columbus, Ohio, United States	
Win	33–13	Anthony Pettis	Decision (split)	WEC 45	December 19, 2009	3	5:00	Las Vegas, Nevada, United States	
Win	32–13	Tyler Combs	TKO (punches)	Xtreme Fighting Organization 32	September 10, 2009	2	3:48	New Munster, Wisconsin, United States	
Loss	31–13	Anthony Njokuani	TKO (punches)	WEC 40	April 5, 2009	2	0:27	Chicago, Illinois, United States	
Loss	31–12	Ricardo Lamas	Decision (unanimous)	WEC 39	March 1, 2009	3	5:00	Corpus Christi, Texas, United States	
Win	31–11	Alex Karalexis	TKO (punches)	WEC 37: Torres vs. Tapia	December 3, 2008	2	1:11	Las Vegas, Nevada, United States	Knockout of the Night.
Win	30–11	Jeff Cox	TKO (punches)	Adrenaline MMA: Guida vs. Russow	June 14, 2008	2	3:07	Chicago, Illinois, United States	
Loss	29–11	Jim Miller	Decision (unanimous)	IFL: New Jersey	April 4, 2008	3	4:00	East Rutherford, New Jersey, United States	
Loss	29–10	Chris Horodecki	Decision (split)	IFL: World Grand Prix Semifinals	November 3, 2007	3	4:00	Hoffman Estates, Illinois, United States	
Loss	29–9	Deividas Taurosevicius	Technical Submission (armbar)	IFL: 2007 Team Championship Final	September 20, 2007	2	1:30	Hollywood, Florida, United States	
Win	29–8	Harris Sarmiento	Submission (guillotine choke)	IFL: 2007 Semifinals	August 2, 2007	3	1:06	East Rutherford, New Jersey, United States	
Win	28–8	John Strawn	KO (punch)	IFL: Chicago	May 19, 2007	1	0:48	Hoffman Estates, Illinois, United States	
Win	27–8	John Gunderson	Decision (split)	IFL: Moline	April 7, 2007	3	4:00	Moline, Illinois, United States	
Loss	26–8	Chris Horodecki	Decision (split)	IFL: Houston	February 2, 2007	3	4:00	Houston, Texas, United States	
Win	26–7	Ryan Schultz	KO (punch)	IFL: Championship Final	December 29, 2006	3	2:16	Uncasville, Connecticut, United States	
Win	25–7	Ivan Menjivar	Decision (split)	IFL: World Championship Semifinals	November 2, 2006	3	4:00	Portland, Oregon, United States	
Win	24–7	Marcio Feitosa	Decision (split)	IFL: Gracie vs. Miletich	September 23, 2006	3	4:00	Moline, Illinois, United States	
Win	23–7	Steve Bruno	KO (punch)	IFL: Championship 2006	June 3, 2006	1	1:48	Atlantic City, New Jersey, United States	
Win	22–7	John Shackelford	TKO (punches)	IFL: Legends Championship 2006	April 29, 2006	2	1:31	Atlantic City, New Jersey, United States	
Win	21–7	Jay Ellis	Submission (triangle choke)	XFO 10: Explosion	March 18, 2006	1	1:43	Lakemoor, Illinois, United States	
Win	20–7	Wayne Weems	TKO (punches)	KOTC: Redemption on the River	February 17, 2006	1	1:11	Moline, Illinois, United States	
Win	19–7	Kyle Brees	Submission (armbar)	Xtreme Fighting Organization 8	December 10, 2005	2	2:41	Lakemoor, Illinois, United States	
Win	18–7	Luke Spencer	Submission (guillotine choke)	Gracie Fighting Challenge	October 14, 2005	1	N/A	Columbus, Ohio, United States	
Win	17–7	Kyle Watson	KO (punches)	Total Fight Challenge 4	September 17, 2005	1	0:25	Hammond, Indiana, United States	
Win	16–7	Josh Koon	KO (punches)	XFO 7: Outdoor War	August 27, 2005	1	0:48	Island Lake, Illinois, United States	
Loss	15–7	Clay Guida	Decision (unanimous)	XFO 6: Judgement Day	June 25, 2005	3	5:00	Lakemoor, Illinois, United States	
Win	15–6	Andrew Chappelle	Decision (unanimous)	SuperBrawl 40	April 30, 2005	3	5:00	Hammond, Indiana, United States	
Win	14–6	Joe Jordan	Decision (unanimous)	Xtreme Fighting Organization 5	March 19, 2005	3	5:00	Lakemoor, Illinois, United States	
Win	13–6	Ryan Ackerman	KO (punches)	Madtown Throwdown 2	February 19, 2005	N/A	N/A	Madison, Wisconsin, United States	
Win	12–6	Luke Caudillo	Submission (guillotine choke)	Combat: Do Fighting Challenge 2	February 5, 2005	N/A	N/A	Illinois, United States	
Win	11–6	Virgil Strzelecki	KO (punch)	XFO 4: International	December 3, 2004	1	0:51	McHenry, Illinois, United States	
Loss	10–6	Gesias Cavalcante	Submission (guillotine choke)	IHC 8: Ethereal	November 20, 2004	1	1:03	Hammond, Indiana, United States	
Win	10–5	Jay Estrada	Submission (triangle choke)	Xtreme Fighting Organization 3	October 2, 2004	1	4:31	McHenry, Illinois, United States	
Win	9–5	Masayuki Okude	KO (punch)	Zst 6	September 12, 2004	1	2:27	Tokyo, Japan	
Loss	8–5	Kolo Koka	Decision (unanimous)	SuperBrawl 36	June 18, 2004	3	3:00	Honolulu, Hawaii, United States	
Win	8–4	Komei Okada	TKO (punches)	SuperBrawl 35	April 16, 2004	3	3:02	Honolulu, Hawaii, United States	
Win	7–4	Tim Newland	Submission (armbar)	XFO 1: The Kickoff	March 14, 2004	1	4:47	Fontana, Wisconsin, United States	
Win	6–4	Mark Long	Submission (armbar)	Extreme Challenge 55	December 5, 2003	1	1:39	Lakemoor, Illinois, United States	
Win	5–4	Jason Bender	Decision (unanimous)	IHC 6: Inferno	November 22, 2003	2	5:00	Lakemoor, Illinois, United States	
Win	4–4	Jay Estrada	TKO	Extreme Challenge 54	October 12, 2003	3	3:23	Lakemoor, Illinois, United States	
Win	3–4	Tom Kirk	Decision (unanimous)	Extreme Challenge 51	August 2, 2003	3	5:00	St. Charles, Illinois, United States	
Win	2–4	Kendrick Johnson	TKO (submission to punches)	Shooto: Midwest Fighting	May 21, 2003	1	2:10	Hammond, Indiana, United States	
Win	1–4	Carlos Armanqui Concha	Submission (armbar)	ICC 2: Rebellion	April 18, 2003	2	3:40	Minneapolis, Minnesota, United States	
Loss	0–4	Darrell Smith	Decision	Freestyle Combat Challenge 9	January 11, 2003	3	5:00	Racine, Wisconsin, United States	
Loss	0–3	Brian Szohr	Decision	TCC: Battle of the Badges	April 13, 2002	1	15:00	Hammond, Indiana, United States	
Loss	0–2	Jim Bruketta	Decision	River Plex Rumble	March 9, 2002	3	5:00	Peoria, Illinois, United States	
Loss	0–1	Cole Escovedo	TKO (submission to punches)	UA 1: The Genesis	January 27, 2002	1	2:10	Hammond, Indiana, United States	

== Amateur mixed martial arts record ==
Professional record breakdown
2 matches	2 wins	0 losses
By knockout	0	0
By submission	2	0
By decision	0	0

Res.	Record	Opponent	Method	Event	Date	Round	Time	Location	Notes
Win	2–0	Cleve Tuttle	Submission (armbar)	Nationals: MMA Nationals 2002	December 14, 2002	2	2:27	Davenport, Iowa, United States	
Win	1–0	Gin Minajev	Submission (triangle choke)	Nationals: MMA Nationals 2002	December 14, 2002	2	4:16	Davenport, Iowa, United States	
