= WEC 52 =

WEC MMA event in 2010

WEC 52: Faber vs. Mizugaki
- The poster for WEC 52: Faber vs. Mizugaki
- Promotion: World Extreme Cagefighting
- Date: November 11, 2010
- Venue: The Pearl at The Palms
- City: (United States) Paradise, Nevada

Event chronology
WEC 51: Aldo vs. Gamburyan	WEC 52: Faber vs. Mizugaki	WEC 53: Henderson vs. Pettis

WEC 52: Faber vs. Mizugaki was a mixed martial arts event held by World Extreme Cagefighting on November 11, 2010 at The Pearl at The Palms in Las Vegas.

== Background ==
Urijah Faber made his bantamweight debut against Japanese striker Takeya Mizugaki at WEC 52.

A bout between Bart Palaszewski and Kamal Shalorus was expected to take place at this event, but was moved to WEC 53 after Shalorus injured his hand.

Brian Bowles was expected to face Wagnney Fabiano at this event but was forced off the card with an injury and replaced by Joseph Benavidez.

Eddie Wineland was expected to face Damacio Page at this event, but was forced out of the bout with a shoulder injury and replaced by Demetrious Johnson.

Josh Grispi was pulled from his fight with Erik Koch, to be inserted into a UFC Featherweight title shot against José Aldo at UFC 125. Koch ended up fighting Francisco Rivera.

This was the last WEC event to feature fights in the featherweight division. No featherweight fighters competed on the final WEC card the next month, and all fighters in the division were subsequently merged into the UFC.

With longtime Zuffa ring announcer Bruce Buffer in Germany for UFC 122, former WEC ring announcer Joe Martinez made a return to handle announcing duties for this event.

The event drew an average of 570,000 viewers on Versus.

== Results ==
Main card
Weight class				Method	Round	Time	Notes
Bantamweight	Urijah Faber	def	Takeya Mizugaki	Technical Submission (rear-naked choke)	1	4:50
Featherweight	Chad Mendes	def	Javier Vazquez	Decision (unanimous) (30-27, 30-27, 30-27)	3	5:00
Featherweight	Erik Koch	def	Francisco Rivera	TKO (head kick and punches)	1	1:36
Bantamweight	Joseph Benavidez	def	Wagnney Fabiano	Submission (guillotine choke)	2	2:45
Bantamweight	Demetrious Johnson	def	Damacio Page	Submission (guillotine choke)	3	2:27
Preliminary card
Featherweight	Raphael Assunção	def	LC Davis	Decision (unanimous) (30-27, 30-27, 30-27)	3	5:00
Lightweight	Anthony Njokuani	def	Edward Faaloloto	TKO (knees and elbows)	2	4:54
Lightweight	Dustin Poirier	def	Zach Micklewright	TKO (punches)	1	0:53
Bantamweight	Michael McDonald	def	Clint Godfrey	Submission (armbar)	1	2:42
Featherweight	Cub Swanson	def	Mackens Semerzier	Decision (split) (29-28, 28-29, 29-28)	3	5:00	(Note: This bout aired on the live broadcast.)
Featherweight	Yves Jabouin	def	Brandon Visher	Decision (unanimous) (30-27, 30-27, 30-27)	3	5:00

== Bonus Awards ==
Fighters were awarded $10,000 bonuses.

- Fight of the Night: (United States) Cub Swanson vs. (United States) Mackens Semerzier
- Knockout of the Night: (United States) Erik Koch
- Submission of the Night: (United States) Urijah Faber

== Reported payout ==
The following is the reported payout to the fighters as reported to the Nevada State Athletic Commission. It does not include sponsor money or "locker room" bonuses often given by the WEC and also do not include the WEC's traditional "fight night" bonuses.

- Urijah Faber: $56,000 (includes $28,000 win bonus) def. Takeya Mizugaki: $10,000
- Chad Mendes: $17,000 ($8,500 win bonus) def. Javier Vazquez: $11,000
- Erik Koch: $8,000 ($4,000 win bonus) def. Francisco Rivera: $4,000
- Joseph Benavidez: $35,000 ($17,500 win bonus) def. Wagnney Fabiano: $19,000
- Demetrious Johnson: $8,000 ($4,000 win bonus) def. Damacio Page: $9,000
- Raphael Assunção: $26,000 ($13,000 win bonus) def. LC Davis: $11,000
- Anthony Njokuani: $14,000 ($7,000 win bonus) def. Eddie Faaloloto: $3,500
- Dustin Poirier: $6,000 ($3,000 win bonus) def. Zach Micklewright: $3,000
- Michael McDonald: $6,000 ($3,000 win bonus) def. Clint Godfrey: $3,000
- Cub Swanson: $22,000 ($11,000 win bonus) def. Mackens Semerzier: $4,000
- Yves Jabouin: $5,000 ($2,000 win bonus) def. Brandon Visher: $4,000

== See also ==
- World Extreme Cagefighting
- List of World Extreme Cagefighting champions
- List of WEC events
- 2010 in WEC
