= Diego Nunes (fighter) =

Brazilian mixed martial arts fighter

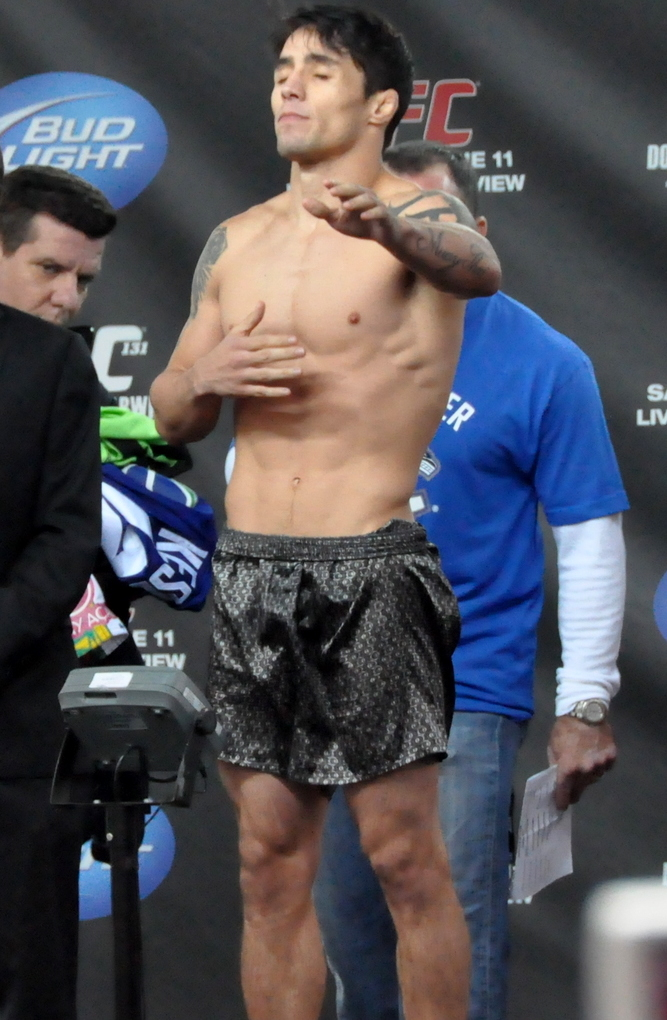
- Born: November 30, 1982 (age 43); Caxias do Sul, Rio Grande do Sul, Brazil
- Other names: The Gun
- Height: 5 ft 6 in (1.68 m)
- Weight: 145.1 lb (66 kg; 10 st 5 lb)
- Division: Lightweight; Featherweight
- Reach: 67.0 in (170 cm)
- Stance: Orthodox
- Fighting out of: Los Angeles, California, United States
- Team: Evolução Thay Brasil
- Rank: Purple belt in Brazilian Jiu-Jitsu
- Years active: 2004–present

Mixed martial arts record
- Total: 35
- Wins: 25
- By knockout: 8
- By submission: 10
- By decision: 7
- Losses: 10
- By knockout: 2
- By decision: 7
- By disqualification: 1

Other information
- Website: Official UFC Profile
- Mixed martial arts record from Sherdog
- Last updated on: February 16, 2011

Diego Torresean Nunes (born November 30, 1982) is a Brazilian mixed martial artist. A professional since 2004, he has fought for the UFC, WEC, Bellator MMA, RXF, Fight Nights Global, and the Rizin Fighting Federation.

== Mixed martial arts career ==
Nunes trains with Team Nogueira Brazil. Nunes' professional career in mixed martial arts began in May 2004, when he defeated Jorge Santos Velho by TKO. He has fought in GP, TFC, Shooto, WEC and the UFC.

=== World Extreme Cagefighting ===
Nunes won his WEC debut against Cole Province by unanimous decision at WEC 37. Nunes was scheduled to fight Cub Swanson on the undercard at WEC 40, but a hand injury just days before the bout, forced Nunes to cancel the fight. He next fought Rafael Dias at WEC 42 on August 9, 2009. Nunes defeated Dias via unanimous decision (30–27, 30–27, 30–27).

Nunes suffered his first professional loss to LC Davis via unanimous decision at WEC 44.

Nunes was expected to face Leonard Garcia on March 6, 2010 at WEC 47, but Nunes was forced from the card with an injury. Nunes was replaced by former UFC fighter George Roop.

Nunes then faced Raphael Assunção on June 20, 2010 at WEC 49. He won the fight via split decision.

Nunes faced Tyler Toner on September 30, 2010 at WEC 51. He won the fight via unanimous decision.

=== Ultimate Fighting Championship ===
On October 28, 2010, World Extreme Cagefighting merged with the Ultimate Fighting Championship. As part of the merger, all WEC fighters were transferred to the UFC.

Nunes faced Mike Brown on January 1, 2011 at UFC 125. He won the fight via split decision.

Nunes faced Kenny Florian on June 11, 2011 at UFC 131. He lost the fight via unanimous decision.

Nunes was expected to face Manvel Gamburyan on September 24, 2011 at UFC 135, but Gamburyan pulled out of the fight due to a shoulder injury. Then, on August 29, Nunes confirmed his own exit from the card, citing an injury.

Nunes/Gamburyan eventually took place on December 30, 2011 at UFC 141. Nunes won the fight via unanimous decision (29-28, 29-28, 29-28).

Nunes next faced Dennis Siver on April 14, 2012 at UFC on Fuel TV: Gustafsson vs. Silva. He lost the fight via unanimous decision.

Nunes faced Bart Palaszewski on October 5, 2012 at UFC on FX 5. After three full rounds, Nunes won the fight via unanimous decision (30-27, 29-28, 30-27). The performance also earned both participants Fight of the Night honors.

Nunes then faced Nik Lentz on January 19, 2013 at UFC on FX: Belfort vs. Bisping. He lost the fight via unanimous decision and was subsequently released from the promotion.

=== Bellator MMA ===
In June 2013, it was revealed that Nunes signed with Bellator MMA.

In his debut, Nunes faced prior title challenger Patricio Freire at Bellator 99 in the Quarterfinals of the season nine featherweight tournament. He lost the fight via knockout at just 1:19 in the first round. This is the first time that Nunes had ever been knocked out, or even finished, in his career.

In February 2014, Nunes entered into the Bellator season ten featherweight tournament. He faced Matt Bessette in the quarterfinals at Bellator 110 and lost the back-and-forth fight via split decision.

=== Post Bellator ===
After an unsuccessful run in Bellator, Nunes faced longtime MMA veteran Joachim Hansen at Superior Challenge 11 for the featherweight title. Nunes won the fight by KO in the second round with a hard left hand after breaking his knee in the first round

=== Fight Nights Global (FNG) ===
After recovering from a knee injury for almost two years, Nunes signed with Fight Nights Global and his debut was at the Fight Nights Global 51: Dagestan battle 2, on 25 September 2016 against Rasul Mirzaev. He lost the fight by knockout in the first round.

=== Post FNG ===
After Fight Nights Global Nunes fought Radu Mihaita in Italy-based promotion Magnum FC in July 2017. Nunes won the fight via knockout.

In the beginning of December 2017, Nunes fought Michel Ersoy in Swedish promotion Superior Challenge. Nunes won the fight via guillotine choke.

Just two weeks after the fight with Ersoy, Nunes fought Corneliu Lascăr in Romania at RXF 29: All Stars and won via guillotine choke.

=== Rizin FF ===
After amassing a win streak of three in the European circuits, Nunes signed a contract with Rizin Fighting Federation. He was slated against Yusuke Yachi at Rizin 10 and lost a close fight via split decision.

== Personal life ==
Nunes is of Italian descent. He is married to his wife Karen. He is a Christian and regularly posts Bible verses on his Facebook page.

== Championships and achievements ==
- Ultimate Fighting Championship
  - Fight of the Night (One time) vs. Bart Palaszewski
- Superior Challenge
  - SC Featherweight Championship (One time, current)

== Mixed martial arts record ==
Professional record breakdown
35 matches	25 wins	10 losses
By knockout	8	2
By submission	10	0
By decision	7	7
By disqualification	0	1

Res.	Record	Opponent	Method	Event	Date	Round	Time	Location	Notes
Win	25–10	Kiichi Kunimoto	KO (punches)	Fire Cage FC 1	February 22, 2025	1	1:15	Nilai, Malaysia	Won the inaugural Fire Cage FC Welterweight Championship.
Win	24–10	Mauricio Otalora	Submission (guillotine choke)	Cage FS 15	March 15, 2024	1	0:46	Graz, Austria	
Loss	23–10	Paulo Ricardo Rodrigues	Disqualification (illegal soccer kick)	Falcon MMA 2	November 4, 2023			Rio de Janeiro, Brazil	
Loss	23–9	Ronys Torres	Decision (unanimous)	Centurion FC: Rex Redemptor	May 26, 2023	3	5:00	Rio de Janeiro, Brazil	Welterweight bout.
Win	23–8	Simon Sköld	Submission (guillotine choke)	Superior Challenge 19	May 11, 2019	1	2:55	Stockholm, Sweden	Defended the SC Featherweight Championship.
Loss	22–8	Yusuke Yachi	Decision (split)	Rizin 10	May 6, 2018	3	5:00	Fukuoka, Japan	
Win	22–7	Corneliu Lascăr	Submission (guillotine choke)	RXF 29: All Stars	December 18, 2017	3	4:46	Brasov, Romania	
Win	21–7	Michel Ersoy	Submission (guillotine choke)	Superior Challenge 16	December 2, 2017	2	0:54	Stockholm, Sweden	Defended the SC Featherweight Championship.
Win	20–7	Radu Mihatu	KO (punch)	Magnum Fighting Championship 2	July 22, 2017	1	0:25	Rome, Italy	Lightweight debut.
Loss	19–7	Rasul Mirzaev	TKO (punches)	Fight Nights Global 51: Pavlovich vs. Gelegaev	September 25, 2016	1	1:45	Kaspiysk, Dagestan, Russia	
Win	19–6	Joachim Hansen	KO (punch)	Superior Challenge 11	November 29, 2014	2	1:51	Sodertalje, Sweden	Won the SC Featherweight Championship.
Loss	18–6	Matt Bessette	Decision (split)	Bellator 110	February 28, 2014	3	5:00	Uncasville, Connecticut, United States	Bellator Season Ten Featherweight Tournament Quarterfinal.
Loss	18–5	Patrício Freire	KO (punch)	Bellator 99	September 13, 2013	1	1:19	Temecula, California, United States	Bellator Season Nine Featherweight Tournament Quarterfinal.
Loss	18–4	Nik Lentz	Decision (unanimous)	UFC on FX: Belfort vs. Bisping	January 19, 2013	3	5:00	São Paulo, Brazil	
Win	18–3	Bart Palaszewski	Decision (unanimous)	UFC on FX: Browne vs. Bigfoot	October 5, 2012	3	5:00	Minneapolis, Minnesota, United States	Fight of the Night.
Loss	17–3	Dennis Siver	Decision (unanimous)	UFC on Fuel TV: Gustafsson vs. Silva	April 14, 2012	3	5:00	Stockholm, Sweden	
Win	17–2	Manvel Gamburyan	Decision (unanimous)	UFC 141	December 30, 2011	3	5:00	Las Vegas, Nevada, United States	
Loss	16–2	Kenny Florian	Decision (unanimous)	UFC 131	June 11, 2011	3	5:00	Vancouver, British Columbia, Canada	
Win	16–1	Mike Brown	Decision (split)	UFC 125	January 1, 2011	3	5:00	Las Vegas, Nevada, United States	
Win	15–1	Tyler Toner	Decision (unanimous)	WEC 51	September 30, 2010	3	5:00	Broomfield, Colorado, United States	
Win	14–1	Raphael Assunção	Decision (split)	WEC 49	June 20, 2010	3	5:00	Edmonton, Alberta, Canada	
Loss	13–1	LC Davis	Decision (unanimous)	WEC 44	November 18, 2009	3	5:00	Las Vegas, Nevada, United States	
Win	13–0	Rafael Dias	Decision (unanimous)	WEC 42	August 9, 2009	3	5:00	Las Vegas, Nevada, United States	
Win	12–0	Cole Province	Decision (unanimous)	WEC 37: Torres vs. Tapia	December 3, 2008	3	5:00	Las Vegas, Nevada, United States	
Win	11–0	Marcelo Franca	Submission (guillotine choke)	Shooto: Brazil 8	August 30, 2008	1	2:20	Rio de Janeiro, Brazil	
Win	10–0	Henrique Mello	KO (head kick)	Top Fighting Championships 3	May 2, 2007	1	N/A	Rio de Janeiro, Brazil	
Win	9–0	Luciano Dos Santos	Submission (guillotine choke)	Sul Fight Championship 1	September 16, 2006	1	4:40	Santa Catarina, Brazil	
Win	8–0	Jetron Azevedo	Submission (armbar)	Storm Samurai 10	January 28, 2006	1	N/A	Brazil	
Win	7–0	Piri Piri	Submission (guillotine choke)	Floripa Fight 1	November 26, 2005	1	0:55	Florianópolis, Brazil	
Win	6–0	Einstein Santana	Submission (guillotine choke)	Battle Front 1	May 29, 2005	1	N/A	Brazil	
Win	5–0	Jorge dos Santos Velho	TKO	GP: Tornado 5	March 19, 2005	1	N/A	Caxias do Sul, Brazil	
Win	4–0	Giovani Diniz	KO	Profight Championships 3	January 31, 2005	N/A	N/A	Brazil	
Win	3–0	Lindomar Silva	Submission (guillotine choke)	GP: Tornado 3	October 28, 2004	N/A	N/A	Brazil	
Win	2–0	Michel Michel	KO	GP: Tornado 2	July 18, 2004	1	0:30	Brazil	
Win	1–0	Jorge dos Santos Velho	TKO (punches)	Copa Gaucha: Fight Center 2	May 15, 2004	2	N/A	Caxias do Sul, Brazil	

== See also ==
- List of Bellator MMA alumni
