= Joe Martinez =

American sports announcer (born 1975)

Joe A. Martinez
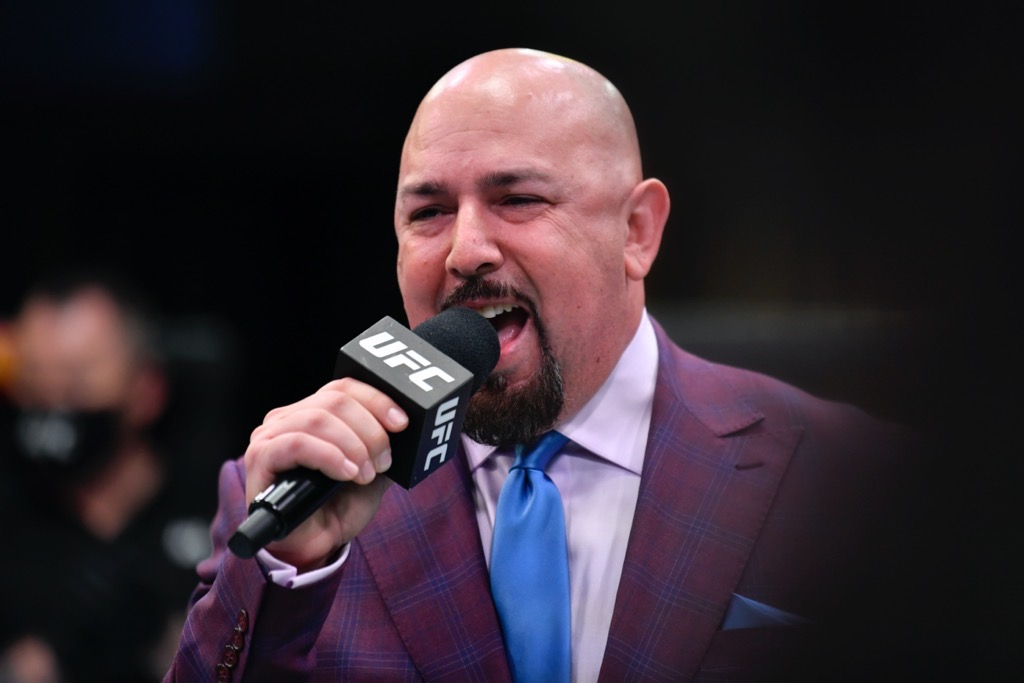
- Born: Apple Valley, California, U.S.
- Education: Bachelor of Arts, Communication
- Alma mater: California State University, Fullerton
- Occupation: Ring/sports announcer
- Years active: 1994–present
- Employer: JL Exclusive LLC
- Spouse: Lena

Joseph Anthony Martinez (born April 10, 1975) is an American ring announcer known for having worked with mixed martial arts promotions Invicta FC, and the UFC.

== Career ==
A communications graduate of California State University, Fullerton, Martinez began his professional career in 1996 as both the public address announcer for the Lake Elsinore Storm Minor League Baseball team (a San Diego Padres affiliate) and various Cal State Fullerton athletic programs.After retiring from the Storm and Cal State Fullerton in 2017, he relocated from Orange County, CA to North Georgia.

Martinez has been the main ring announcer for Golden Boy Boxing since 2011 and has also been an occasional Octagon announcer for UFC since 2007, carrying over from the now merged World Extreme Cagefighting and has announced over 100 events under the Zuffa banner. More recently, he was signed by the Professional Fighters League PFL in 2018 to handle MC duties for the organization's inaugural season.

=== Baseball, softball and basketball ===
In 1996, Martinez began his career as a public address announcer for the Lake Elsinore Storm, a Minor League team affiliate of the San Diego Padres. He announced the Women's College World Series in 1998 and a U.S. Olympic Softball Team tour in 2000. From 2001 to 2002, he worked for The Harlem Globetrotters.

=== Boxing ===
Martinez became the featured ring announcer for Oscar De La Hoya's, Fox reality television series "The Next Great Champ" in 2004. In 2006 he began announcing for Guilty Boxing Promotions on ESPN Deportes. Now he can be seen announcing for Golden Boy Promotions and other promotions on various networks around the world.

=== Mixed martial arts ===
Martinez was the cage announcer for World Extreme Cagefighting from 2007 to 2010. In 2010, WEC was merged into UFC by parent company Zuffa, LLC. Since then, he has worked with Cage Warriors Fighting Championship, announcing fights across the globe.

Martinez is the ring announcer for Invicta FC, and the UFC, including being the cage announcer for UFC 267, where he replaced Bruce Buffer. As Martinez is fluent in both English and Spanish, he also announces often in Mexico.

On April 27, 2024, he was reportedly ill, and was replaced by Charly Arnolt, making her the first female UFC ring announcer.

=== Other appearances ===
Sony PlayStation MLB 06: The Show, MLB 07: The Show, "King of the Diamond" - In-game Public Address Announcer (2006) (2007).
