= World Extreme Cagefighting =

MMA promoter based in U.S.

- Type: Private
- Industry: Mixed martial arts promotion
- Founded: 2001
- Founder: Scott Adams; Reed Harris
- Defunct: 2010
- Successor: Ultimate Fighting Championship
- Headquarters: Las Vegas, Nevada, United States
- Owner: TKO Group Holdings
- Website: http://www.wec.tv

World Extreme Cagefighting (WEC) was an American mixed martial arts (MMA) promotion founded in 2001. Originally established as a regional promotion, the promotion was acquired by Zuffa, then the parent company of the Ultimate Fighting Championship (UFC), in 2006. Under Zuffa's ownership, the WEC underwent a gradual transformation, eventually focusing primarily on the lighter weight classes and developing a roster that included many fighters who would later become prominent UFC competitors.

In its final years, the WEC contested bouts in three weight classes: bantamweight (135 lb; 61 kg), featherweight (145 lb; 66 kg), and lightweight (155 lb; 70 kg). The promotion was also distinguished by its use of a 25-foot (7.6 m) diameter cage, smaller than the standard 30-foot (9.1 m) UFC cage. The WEC held its final event in December 2010, after which its remaining divisions and fighters were incorporated into the UFC.

== History ==
Scott Adams and Reed Harris started the organization in 2001. Between 2001 and 2006, most of their events were held at Tachi Palace Hotel & Casino in Lemoore, California, and aired on HDNet. In December 2006, Zuffa purchased WEC. With the purchase, WEC continued as a separate promotion with its own roster of fighters. Adams was retained after the purchase as the organization's matchmaker. Harris and Adams were named co-General Managers and were both active in the new WEC. In 2008, Sean Shelby was named the new match-maker for the promotion by Zuffa.

Zuffa made several changes to the promotion after the purchase. It discontinued its pentagonal cage for a modified version of the UFC's octagonal cage, with a 25-foot diameter instead of the UFC's 30-foot diameter cage. The championships of fighters who were contracted UFC fighters were vacated. The promotion moved to focus on lighter weight classes, abandoning their heavyweight and super heavyweight divisions and championships, and retaining their bantamweight and featherweight divisions—two divisions not then present in the UFC. After the purchase, several WEC events were held in Zuffa's hometown of Las Vegas, Nevada, much like the UFC.

WEC aired their events live on Versus (formerly known as the Outdoor Life Network and now as the NBC Sports Network) in the United States and on TSN (and later The Score) in Canada. WEC's first live event was broadcast on June 3, 2007, on Versus from The Joint at the Hard Rock Hotel and Casino in Las Vegas.

Todd Harris was the play by play announcer on every televised WEC event on Versus, and was joined by former UFC Heavyweight Champion Frank Mir on color commentary until the spring of 2010, when Mir was replaced by UFC light heavyweight Stephan Bonnar. Fellow Zuffa fighters Kenny Florian and Jens Pulver have also filled in on color commentary due to Mir or Bonnar's absences. UFC announcers Mike Goldberg and Joe Rogan called WEC's only pay-per-view event, WEC 48 in April 2010. Postfight interviews on the Versus-televised cards were typically done by either Harris or Versus sportscaster Craig Hummer.

Joe Martinez served as the announcer for Zuffa-promoted WEC events until April 2010, when he left the organization and was replaced by UFC announcer Bruce Buffer. However, Martinez made a one-off return at WEC 52 that November when Buffer was overseas for a UFC event.

WEC announced that it would dissolve their light heavyweight and middleweight divisions after their December 3, 2008 event to further their concentration on lighter classes. Fighters from the light heavyweight and middleweight divisions started fighting in the UFC after the dissolution of their divisions. Also, on February 3, 2009, WEC officially announced the creation of a 125 lb (57 kg) flyweight division and the dissolution of its welterweight division (flyweight would have been the last division under the "Unified Rules of MMA" to be activated under Zuffa, excluding Super Heavyweight). Fighters from the welterweight division started fighting in the UFC after the dissolution of their division. The only weight class that still crossed over between WEC and the UFC prior to the merger was the 155 lb (70 kg) lightweight division.

On January 8, 2010, World Extreme Cagefighting announced that Amp Energy would be the official energy drink of WEC. Amp Energy also sponsored three of WEC's top stars - featherweight Urijah Faber, featherweight Chad Mendes, and bantamweight Joseph Benavidez.

On April 24, 2010, WEC held its only pay-per-view event, WEC 48, which featured two championship fights. The main event featured WEC Featherweight Champion José Aldo defending his title against former champion Urijah Faber.

On October 28, 2010, UFC President Dana White announced that WEC would merge with the UFC.

== Relationship with the UFC ==
Due to its shared ownership under Zuffa, fans and commentators had continually speculated about a unification between WEC and the UFC, particularly the lower weight classes. The relationship between the WEC and UFC had also been complicated by their respective primary partnerships with cable television channels, Versus and Spike, Fight Magazine reported. On October 28, 2010, Dana White announced the merger with the UFC.

== Last champions ==
Before the UFC bought out the WEC in December of 2010, there were 3 weight classes in its final incarnation, which were Bantamweight, Featherweight, and Lightweight.

At WEC 53, the last event before the promotion was closed down, there were two title fights between concurrent champion Benson Henderson and Anthony Pettis, which was for the WEC Lightweight Championship.

The second fight was against concurrent champion Dominick Cruz and Scott Jorgensen, to determine the final Bantamweight Champion, and the inaugural UFC Bantamweight Champion.

These titleholders were the final champions at the date of WEC 53, the last event of the promotion’s existence.

=== Official final champions (2009-2010) ===
Division	Weight limit	Champion	Since	Title defenses
Lightweight	155 lb (70 kg)	(United States) Anthony Pettis	December 16, 2010	0
Featherweight	145 lb (66 kg)	(Brazil) José Aldo	November 3, 2009	2
Bantamweight	135 lb (61 kg)	(United States) Dominick Cruz	March 16, 2010	2

Before the abolishment period in 2006 (Abolishment of the WEC’s Super Heavyweight and Heavyweight divisions) and the absorption period between 2008-2009 (Absorption of the Light Heavyweight, Middleweight, and Welterweight classes of the WEC into the UFC’s own divisions), there were 5 other divisions before the focus on Lightweight, Featherweight, and Bantamweight fighters.

These titleholders were the final champions of their weight classes before the absorption of the WEC’s Welterweight division on February 3, 2009.

=== Final champions (2001-2009) ===
Division	Weight limit	Champion	From	To	Title defenses
Super Heavyweight	Unlimited	(United States) Ron Waterman	August 9, 2003	December 2006	1
Heavyweight	250 lb (110 kg)	(United States) Brian Olsen	January 13, 2006	December 2006	1
Light Heavyweight	200 lb (91 kg)	(United States) Steve Cantwell	August 3, 2008	December 3, 2008	0
Middleweight	185 lb (84 kg)	(Brazil) Paulo Filho	August 5, 2007	December 3, 2008	1
Welterweight	170 lb (77 kg)	(United States) Carlos Condit	March 24, 2007	February 3, 2009	3

== Media coverage ==
On December 11, 2006, UFC parent-company, Zuffa, formalized plans to buy World Extreme Cagefighting, to be run as a separate promotion from the UFC. Following the purchase of WEC, Zuffa made several changes to the promotion. One of the most noteworthy changes included added media exposure when WEC signed a deal to air events on Versus beginning with WEC 28. Prior to this WEC had broadcast most of their events on HDNet.

While on Versus, most events aired mid-week, or on Sunday nights during the summer months. WEC drew good ratings that averaged around 575,000 average viewers per event. However ratings ranged from 245,000 to 1,500,000.

The biggest ratings draw for WEC was Urijah Faber. When Faber was featured in the main event he drew an average of 840,000 viewers. Faber was also featured in both main events (34 and 41) that drew over a million viewers for WEC.

The following table shows the international broadcasting of WEC events:

Australia	Setanta Sports	Canada	The Score	Brazil	Canal Combate
Denmark	Canal 9	Israel	EgoTotal	Mexico	Canal 28
(United States) U.S.	Versus	United Kingdom	Extreme Sports		

== See also ==
- List of WEC events
- List of WEC champions
- List of WEC bonus award recipients
