= 2009 in WEC =

World Extreme Cagefighting events

Information
- First date: January 25, 2009
- Last date: December 19, 2009

Events
- Total events: 8

Fights
- Total fights: 82
- Title fights: 7

Chronology
2008 in WEC	2009 in WEC	2010 in WEC

The year 2009 was the 9th year in the history of World Extreme Cagefighting, a mixed martial arts promotion based in the United States. In 2009 WEC held 8 events beginning with, WEC 38: Varner vs. Cerrone.

== Title fights ==
Title fights in 2009
Weight class				Method	Round	Time	Event	Notes
Lightweight	Jamie Varner (c)	def.	Donald Cerrone	Decision (technical split) (49-46, 47-48, 49-46)	5	3:10	WEC 38: Varner vs. Cerrone	(Note: For the Lightweight Championship. Bout was stopped after Cerrone landed an illegal knee to the head of Varner while he was on the ground. Since Varner was unable to continue, the bout went to the scorecards.)
Featherweight	Mike Brown (c)	def.	Leonard Garcia	Submission (arm-triangle choke)	1	1:57	WEC 39: Brown vs. Garcia	(Note: For the Featherweight Championship.)
Bantamweight	Miguel Torres (c)	def.	Takeya Mizugaki	Decision (unanimous) (49-46, 49-46, 48-47)	5	5:00	WEC 40: Torres vs. Mizugaki	(Note: For the Bantamweight Championship.)
Featherweight	Mike Brown (c)	def.	Urijah Faber	Decision (unanimous) (49-46, 49-46, 48-47)	5	5:00	WEC 41: Brown vs. Faber II	(Note: For the Featherweight Championship.)
Bantamweight	Brian Bowles	def.	Miguel Torres (c)	KO (punches)	1	3:57	WEC 42: Torres vs. Bowles	(Note: For the Bantamweight Championship.)
Lightweight	Benson Henderson	def.	Donald Cerrone	Decision (unanimous) (48-47, 48-47, 48-47)	5	5:00	WEC 43: Cerrone vs. Henderson	(Note: For the Interim Lightweight Championship.)
Featherweight	José Aldo	def.	Mike Brown (c)	TKO (strikes)	2	1:20	WEC 44: Brown vs. Aldo	(Note: For the Featherweight Championship.)

== Events list ==
No.	Event	Date	Venue	Location	Attendance
45	WEC 45: Cerrone vs. Ratcliff	December 19, 2009	Pearl at The Palms	Las Vegas, Nevada	1,741
44	WEC 44: Brown vs. Aldo	November 18, 2009	Pearl at The Palms	Las Vegas, Nevada	1,835
43	WEC 43: Cerrone vs. Henderson	October 10, 2009	AT&T Center	San Antonio, Texas	5,176
42	WEC 42: Torres vs. Bowles	August 9, 2009	Hard Rock Hotel and Casino	Las Vegas, Nevada	2,082
41	WEC 41: Brown vs. Faber II	June 7, 2009	ARCO Arena	Sacramento, California	13,027
40	WEC 40: Torres vs. Mizugaki	April 5, 2009	UIC Pavilion	Chicago, Illinois	5,257
39	WEC 39: Brown vs. Garcia	March 1, 2009	American Bank Center	Corpus Christi, Texas	6,100
38	WEC 38: Varner vs. Cerrone	January 25, 2009	San Diego Sports Arena	San Diego, California	10,201

== WEC 38: Varner vs. Cerrone ==
WEC 38: Varner vs. Cerrone was an event held on January 25, 2009 at the San Diego Sports Arena in San Diego, California.

=== Results ===
Main card
Weight class				Method	Round	Time	Notes
Lightweight	Jamie Varner (c)	def.	Donald Cerrone	Decision (technical split) (49–46, 47–48, 49–46)	5	3:10	(Note: For the Lightweight Championship. Bout was stopped after Cerrone landed an illegal knee to the head of Varner while he was on the ground. Since Varner was unable to continue, the bout went to the scorecards.)
Featherweight	Urijah Faber	def.	Jens Pulver	Submission (guillotine choke)	1	1:34
Welterweight	Danillo Villefort	def.	Mike Campbell	TKO (punches)	1	3:53
Featherweight	José Aldo	def.	Rolando Perez	TKO (strikes)	1	4:15
Preliminary card
Lightweight	Benson Henderson	def.	Anthony Njokuani	Submission (guillotine choke)	2	0:42
Welterweight	Edgar Garcia	def.	Hiromitsu Miura	KO (punches)	1	1:18
Bantamweight	Dominick Cruz	def.	Ian McCall	Decision (unanimous) (30-27, 30-27, 30-27)	3	5:00
Bantamweight	Scott Jorgensen	def.	Frank Gomez	Submission (guillotine choke)	1	1:09
Welterweight	Jesse Lennox	vs.	Blas Avena	KO (punches)	2	0:41
Bantamweight	Charlie Valencia	def.	Seth Dikun	Decision (unanimous) (30-27, 30-27, 30-27)	3	5:00

== WEC 39: Brown vs. Garcia ==
WEC 39: Brown vs. Garcia was an event held on March 1, 2009 at the American Bank Center in Corpus Christi, Texas.

=== Results ===
Main card
Weight class				Method	Round	Time	Notes
Featherweight	Mike Brown (c)	def.	Leonard Garcia	Submission (arm-triangle choke)	1	1:57	(Note: For the Featherweight Championship.)
Lightweight	Ricardo Lamas	def.	Bart Palaszewski	Decision (unanimous) (30-27, 30-27, 30-27)	3	5:00
Featherweight	José Aldo	def.	Chris Mickle	TKO (punches)	1	1:39
Lightweight	Rob McCullough	def.	Marcus Hicks	Decision (majority) (29-29, 30–27, 29-28)	3	5:00
Preliminary card
Lightweight	Danny Castillo	def.	Phil Cardella	Decision (split) (30-27, 28-29, 29-28)	3	5:00
Bantamweight	Damacio Page	def.	Marcos Galvao	KO (punches)	1	0:18	(Note: This bout was featured on the main broadcast.)
Welterweight	Johny Hendricks	def.	Alex Serdyukov	Decision (unanimous) (29-28, 29-28, 29-28)	3	5:00
Bantamweight	Kenji Osawa	def.	Rafael Rebello	Decision (split) (29-28, 29-28, 27-30)	3	5:00
Lightweight	Alex Karalexis	def.	Greg McIntyre	TKO (punches)	1	4:19
Featherweight	John Franchi	def.	Mike Budnik	Decision (split) (29-28, 28-29, 29-28)	3	5:00
Welterweight	Mike Pierce	def.	Justin Haskins	TKO (punches)	3	3:39

== WEC 40: Torres vs. Mizugaki ==
WEC 40: Torres vs. Mizugaki was an event held on April 5, 2009 at the UIC Pavilion in Chicago, Illinois.

=== Results ===
Main card
Weight class				Method	Round	Time	Notes
Bantamweight	Miguel Torres (c)	def.	Takeya Mizugaki	Decision (unanimous) (49–46, 49–46, 48–47)	5	5:00	(Note: For the Bantamweight Championship.)
Bantamweight	Joseph Benavidez	def.	Jeff Curran	Decision (unanimous) (30-27, 29-28, 29-28)	3	5:00
Lightweight	Benson Henderson	def.	Shane Roller	TKO (punches)	1	1:41
Featherweight	Raphael Assunção	def.	Jameel Massouh	Decision (unanimous) (30–27, 30–27, 30–27)	3	5:00
Preliminary card
Lightweight	Anthony Njokuani	def.	Bart Palaszewski	TKO (punches)	2	0:27	(Note: This bout was featured on the main broadcast.)
Bantamweight	Dominick Cruz	def.	Ivan Lopez	Technical Decision (unanimous) (30-27, 30-27, 29-28)	3	3:24	(Note: Cruz landed an illegal knee to the head of Lopez while he was on the ground at 3:24 of round 3. Since Lopez was unable to continue, the bout was stopped and went to the scorecards.)
Featherweight	Wagnney Fabiano	def.	Fredson Paixao	Decision (unanimous) (30-27, 30-27, 30-27)	3	5:00
Bantamweight	Rani Yahya	def.	Eddie Wineland	Submission (rear-naked choke)	1	1:07	(Note: This bout was featured on the main broadcast.)
Bantamweight	Akitoshi Tamura	def.	Manny Tapia	Decision (unanimous) (29-28, 29-28, 29-28)	3	5:00
Featherweight	Rafael Dias	def.	Mike Budnik	Decision (unanimous) (30-27, 29-28, 29-28)	3	5:00

== WEC 41: Brown vs. Faber II ==
WEC 41: Brown vs. Faber II was an event held on June 7, 2009 at the ARCO Arena in Sacramento, California.

=== Results ===
Main card
Weight class				Method	Round	Time	Notes
Featherweight	Mike Brown (c)	def.	Urijah Faber	Decision (unanimous) (49–46, 49–46, 48–47)	5	5:00	(Note: For the Featherweight Championship.)
Featherweight	José Aldo	def.	Cub Swanson	TKO (double flying knee and punches)	1	0:08
Lightweight	Donald Cerrone	def.	James Krause	Submission (rear-naked choke)	1	4:38
Featherweight	Josh Grispi	def.	Jens Pulver	Submission (guillotine choke)	1	0:33
Preliminary card
Featherweight	Manny Gamburyan	def.	John Franchi	Decision (unanimous) (30–27, 30–27, 30–27)	3	5:00
Bantamweight	Rafael Rebello	def.	Kyle Dietz	Submission (rear-naked choke)	1	2:55
Lightweight	Anthony Pettis	def.	Mike Campbell	Submission (triangle choke)	1	1:49	(Note: This bout was featured on the main broadcast.)
Bantamweight	Antonio Banuelos	def.	Scott Jorgensen	Decision (split) (29–28, 28–29, 29–28)	3	5:00	(Note: This bout was featured on the main broadcast.)
Bantamweight	Frank Gomez	def.	Noah Thomas	Submission (arm-triangle choke)	2	3:12
Bantamweight	Seth Dikun	def.	Rolando Perez	Submission (flying triangle choke)	1	2:30	(Note: This bout was featured on the main broadcast.)

== WEC 42: Torres vs. Bowles ==
WEC 42: Torres vs. Bowles was an event held on August 9, 2009 at the Hard Rock Hotel and Casino in Las Vegas, Nevada.

=== Results ===
Main card
Weight class				Method	Round	Time	Notes
Bantamweight	Brian Bowles	def.	Miguel Torres (c)	KO (punches)	1	3:57	(Note: For the Bantamweight Championship.)
Bantamweight	Dominick Cruz	def.	Joseph Benavidez	Decision (unanimous) (30–27, 29–28, 29–28)	3	5:00
Lightweight	Danny Castillo	def.	Ricardo Lamas	TKO (punches)	2	4:15
Bantamweight	Takeya Mizugaki	def.	Jeff Curran	Decision (split) (29-28, 28-29, 29-28)	3	5:00
Featherweight	Leonard Garcia	def.	Jameel Massouh	Decision (split) (29-28, 28-29, 29-28)	3	5:00
Preliminary card
Featherweight	Fredson Paixão	vs.	Cole Province	No Contest (overturned)	3	5:00	(Note: Originally ruled a split decision (29–28, 28-29, 29–28) victory for Province, the result was changed to "No Contest" after Province tested positive for a banned substance during a post fight screening.)
Catchweight (159 lb)	Shane Roller	def.	Marcus Hicks	Decision (unanimous) (30–27, 29–28, 29–28)	3	5:00
Lightweight	Ed Ratcliff	def.	Phil Cardella	Decision (unanimous) (30–27, 30-27, 29–28)	3	5:00
Bantamweight	Rani Yahya	def.	John Hosman	Submission (north-south choke)	1	2:08
Featherweight	Diego Nunes	def.	Rafael Dias	Decision (unanimous) (30–27, 30-27, 30-27)	3	5:00
Featherweight	LC Davis	def.	Javier Vazquez	Decision (split) (30-27, 28–29, 29–28)	3	5:00

== WEC 43: Cerrone vs. Henderson ==
WEC 43: Cerrone vs. Henderson was an event held on October 10, 2009 at the AT&T Center in San Antonio, Texas.

=== Results ===
Main card
Weight class				Method	Round	Time	Notes
Lightweight	Benson Henderson	def.	Donald Cerrone	Decision (unanimous) (48–47, 48–47, 48–47)	5	5:00	(Note: For the Interim Lightweight Championship.)
Lightweight	Dave Jansen	def.	Richard Crunkilton	Decision (unanimous) (30–27, 29–28, 29–28)	3	5:00
Featherweight	Raphael Assunção	def.	Yves Jabouin	Decision (split) (30–27, 27–30, 29–28)	3	5:00
Bantamweight	Damacio Page	def.	Will Campuzano	Submission (rear naked choke)	1	1:02
Preliminary card
Lightweight	Anthony Njokuani	def.	Muhsin Corbbrey	TKO (punches)	2	1:42
Bantamweight	Scott Jorgensen	def.	Noah Thomas	KO (punches)	1	3:13	(Note: This bout was aired on the live broadcast.)
Featherweight	Mackens Semerzier	def.	Wagnney Fabiano	Submission (triangle choke)	1	2:14	(Note: This bout was aired on the live broadcast.)
Bantamweight	Eddie Wineland	def.	Manny Tapia	Decision (unanimous) (30–27, 30–27, 30–27)	3	5:00
Bantamweight	Charlie Valencia	def.	Coty Wheeler	Decision (unanimous) (30–27, 29–28, 29–28)	3	5:00
Featherweight	Deividas Taurosevicius	def.	Javier Vazquez	Decision (split) (29–28, 28–29, 29–28)	3	5:00

== WEC 44: Brown vs. Aldo ==
WEC 44: Brown vs. Aldo was an event held on November 18, 2009 at the Pearl at The Palms in Las Vegas, Nevada.

=== Results ===
Main card
Weight class				Method	Round	Time	Notes
Featherweight	José Aldo	def.	Mike Brown (c)	TKO (strikes)	2	1:20	(Note: For the Featherweight Championship.)
Featherweight	Manny Gamburyan	def.	Leonard Garcia	Decision (unanimous) (30–27, 29–28, 29–28)	3	5:00
Lightweight	Karen Darabedyan	def.	Rob McCullough	Decision (split) (30–27, 27–30, 29–28)	3	5:00
Lightweight	Shane Roller	def.	Danny Castillo	Submission (rear naked choke)	3	3:32
Lightweight	Kamal Shalorus	def.	Will Kerr	TKO (strikes)	1	1:26
Preliminary card
Featherweight	LC Davis	def.	Diego Nunes	Decision (unanimous) (30–26, 30–26, 30–26)	3	5:00	(Note: Nunes was docked one point in round 3 for repeatedly grabbing the fence.)
Featherweight	Cub Swanson	def.	John Franchi	Submission (guillotine choke)	3	4:50
Bantamweight	Antonio Banuelos	def.	Kenji Osawa	Decision (unanimous) (29–28, 29–28, 29–28)	3	5:00
Lightweight	Ricardo Lamas	def.	James Krause	Decision (unanimous) (30–27, 30–27, 30–27)	3	5:00
Bantamweight	Frank Gomez	def.	Seth Dikun	Decision (unanimous) (30–27, 30–27, 29–28)	3	5:00

== WEC 45: Cerrone vs. Ratcliff ==
WEC 45: Cerrone vs. Ratcliff was an event held on December 19, 2009 at the Pearl at The Palms in Las Vegas, Nevada.

=== Results ===
Main card
Weight class				Method	Round	Time	Notes
Lightweight	Donald Cerrone	def.	Ed Ratcliff	Submission (rear-naked choke)	3	3:47
Lightweight	Anthony Njokuani	def.	Chris Horodecki	TKO (strikes)	1	3:33
Bantamweight	Joseph Benavidez	def.	Rani Yahya	TKO (punches)	1	1:35
Bantamweight	Scott Jorgensen	def.	Takeya Mizugaki	Decision (unanimous) (29–28, 29–28, 29–28)	3	5:00
Preliminary card
Lightweight	Bart Palaszewski	def.	Anthony Pettis	Decision (split) (30–27, 28-29, 29–28)	3	5:00
Lightweight	Zach Micklewright	def.	Muhsin Corbbrey	Decision (split) (30–27, 30–27, 30–27)	3	5:00
Bantamweight	Chad George	def.	John Hosman	Decision (unanimous) (30–27, 30–27, 30–27)	3	5:00
Featherweight	Brandon Visher	def.	Courtney Buck	KO (punches)	1	4:45	(Note: This bout was aired on the live broadcast after the Benavidez/Yahya bout.)
Bantamweight	Brad Pickett	def.	Kyle Dietz	Submission (Peruvian necktie)	2	4:36	(Note: This bout was aired on the live broadcast after the Njokuani/Horodecki bout.)
Featherweight	Erik Koch	def.	Jameel Massouh	Decision (unanimous) (30–27, 30–27, 30–27)	3	5:00

== See also ==
- World Extreme Cagefighting
- List of World Extreme Cagefighting champions
- List of WEC events
