= WEC 39 =

World Extreme Cagefighting mixed martial arts event in 2009

WEC 39: Brown vs. Garcia
- The poster for WEC 39: Brown vs. Garcia
- Promotion: World Extreme Cagefighting
- Date: March 1, 2009
- Venue: American Bank Center
- City: Corpus Christi, Texas
- Attendance: 6,100
- Total gate: $279,950

Event chronology
WEC 38: Varner vs. Cerrone	WEC 39: Brown vs. Garcia	WEC 40: Torres vs. Mizugaki

WEC 39: Brown vs. Garcia was a mixed martial arts event held by World Extreme Cagefighting that took place on March 1, 2009 in Corpus Christi, Texas. The event aired live on the Versus Network. WEC Featherweight Champion Mike Brown made his first title defense against number one contender Leonard Garcia at this event.

== Background ==
An originally announced title fight rematch between WEC Welterweight Champion Carlos Condit and challenger Brock Larson was cancelled when Larson suffered an injury in training. It was then announced that following this event, the WEC would dissolve their welterweight division into the UFC.

Richard Crunkilton was scheduled to face Bart Palaszewski at this event in what was originally slated to be a WEC Lightweight Championship title eliminator. However, Crunkilton was pulled from the bout due to an injury and was replaced by WEC newcomer Ricardo Lamas.

Justin Haskins was originally slated to face WEC newcomer Douglas Lima at this event, but Lima was forced out of the event due to delays in getting paperwork from the U.S. Bureau of Citizenship and Immigration Services. Lima was replaced by fellow WEC newcomer Mike Pierce.

WEC featherweight fighter and former UFC Lightweight Champion Jens Pulver filled in for Frank Mir on color commentary for this event, joining Todd Harris on the announce team.

The event drew an estimated 531,000 viewers on Versus.

== Results ==
Main card
Weight class				Method	Round	Time	Notes
Featherweight	Mike Brown (c)	def	Leonard Garcia	Submission (arm-triangle choke)	1	1:57	(Note: For the WEC Featherweight Championship.)
Lightweight	Ricardo Lamas	def	Bart Palaszewski	Decision (unanimous) (30-27, 30-27, 30-27)	3	5:00
Featherweight	José Aldo	def	Chris Mickle	TKO (punches)	1	1:39
Lightweight	Rob McCullough	def	Marcus Hicks	Decision (majority) (29-29, 30–27, 29-28)	3	5:00
Preliminary card
Lightweight	Danny Castillo	def	Phil Cardella	Decision (split) (30-27, 28-29, 29-28)	3	5:00
Bantamweight	Damacio Page	def	Marcos Galvao	KO (punches)	1	0:18	(Note: This bout was featured on the main broadcast.)
Welterweight	Johny Hendricks	def	Alex Serdyukov	Decision (unanimous) (29-28, 29-28, 29-28)	3	5:00
Bantamweight	Kenji Osawa	def	Rafael Rebello	Decision (split) (29-28, 29-28, 27-30)	3	5:00
Lightweight	Alex Karalexis	def	Greg McIntyre	TKO (punches)	1	4:19
Featherweight	John Franchi	def	Mike Budnik	Decision (split) (29-28, 28-29, 29-28)	3	5:00
Welterweight	Mike Pierce	def	Justin Haskins	TKO (punches)	3	3:39

== Bonus awards ==
Fighters were awarded $7,500 bonuses.

- Fight of the Night: (United States) Johny Hendricks vs. (Russia) Alex Serdyukov
- Knockout of the Night: (United States) Damacio Page
- Submission of the Night: (United States) Mike Brown

== See also ==
- World Extreme Cagefighting
- List of World Extreme Cagefighting champions
- List of WEC events
- 2009 in WEC
