= WEC 41 =

World Extreme Cagefighting mixed martial arts event in 2009

WEC 41: Brown vs. Faber 2
- The poster for WEC 41: Brown vs. Faber 2
- Promotion: World Extreme Cagefighting
- Date: June 7, 2009
- Venue: Arco Arena
- City: Sacramento, California
- Attendance: 13,027
- Total gate: $815,415

Event chronology
WEC 40: Torres vs. Mizugaki	WEC 41: Brown vs. Faber 2	WEC 42: Torres vs. Bowles

WEC 41: Brown vs. Faber 2 was a mixed martial arts event held by World Extreme Cagefighting on June 7, 2009 at the Arco Arena in Sacramento, California. It was the most successful show in the WEC's history.

== Background ==
Featherweight champion Mike Brown defended his title in a rematch against former champion and no. 1 contender Urijah Faber in the main event.

Eddie Wineland was expected to face Frank Gomez at the event, but was forced off the card with an injury and replaced by WEC newcomer Noah Thomas.

Richard Crunkilton was expected to face Donald Cerrone at this event, but was forced out of the bout with an injury and replaced by James Krause.

Charlie Valencia was originally slated to face WEC newcomer Kyle Dietz at this event, but withdrew from the bout due to injury and was replaced by Rafael Rebello.

The event drew an estimated 1,300,000 viewers on Versus. UFC lightweight Kenny Florian acted as a special guest color commentator as Frank Mir was unavailable after his wife went into labor.

== Results ==
Main card
Weight class				Method	Round	Time	Notes
Featherweight	Mike Brown (c)	def	Urijah Faber	Decision (unanimous) (49–46, 49–46, 48–47)	5	5:00	(Note: For the WEC Featherweight Championship.)
Featherweight	José Aldo	def	Cub Swanson	TKO (flying knee and punches)	1	0:08
Lightweight	Donald Cerrone	def	James Krause	Submission (rear-naked choke)	1	4:38
Featherweight	Josh Grispi	def	Jens Pulver	Submission (guillotine choke)	1	0:33
Preliminary card
Featherweight	Manvel Gamburyan	def	John Franchi	Decision (unanimous) (30–27, 30–27, 30–27)	3	5:00
Bantamweight	Rafael Rebello	def	Kyle Dietz	Submission (rear-naked choke)	1	2:55
Lightweight	Anthony Pettis	def	Mike Campbell	Submission (triangle choke)	1	1:49	(Note: This bout was featured on the main broadcast.)
Bantamweight	Antonio Banuelos	def	Scott Jorgensen	Decision (split) (29–28, 28–29, 29–28)	3	5:00	(Note: This bout was featured on the main broadcast.)
Bantamweight	Frank Gomez	def	Noah Thomas	Submission (arm-triangle choke)	2	3:12
Bantamweight	Seth Dikun	def	Rolando Perez	Submission (flying triangle choke)	1	2:30	(Note: This bout was featured on the main broadcast.)

== Bonus awards ==
Fighters were awarded $10,000 bonuses.

- Fight of the Night: (United States) Mike Brown vs. (United States) Urijah Faber
- Knockout of the Night: (Brazil) José Aldo
- Submission of the Night: (United States) Seth Dikun

== Payouts ==
The following is the reported payout to the fighters as reported to the California State Athletic Commission. It does not include sponsor money or "locker room" bonuses often given by the WEC and also do not include the WEC's traditional "fight night" bonuses.

- Mike Brown: $26,000 (includes $13,000 win bonus) def. Urijah Faber: $26,000
- José Aldo: $22,000 ($11,000 win bonus) def. Cub Swanson: $9,000
- Donald Cerrone: $18,000 ($9,000 win bonus) def. James Krause: $2,000
- Josh Grispi: $18,000 ($9,000 win bonus) def. Jens Pulver: $33,000
- Manny Gamburyan: $28,000 ($14,000 win bonus) def. John Franchi: $4,000
- Rafael Rebello: $4,000 ($2,000 win bonus) def. Kyle Dietz: $2,000
- Anthony Pettis: $4,000 ($2,000 win bonus) def. Mike Campbell: $4,000
- Antonio Banuelos: $10,000 ($5,000 win bonus) def. Scott Jorgensen: $6,000
- Frank Gomez: $4,000 ($2,000 win bonus) def. Noah Thomas: $3,000
- Seth Dikun: $4,000 ($2,000 win bonus) def. Rolando Perez: $3,000

== See also ==
- World Extreme Cagefighting
- List of World Extreme Cagefighting champions
- List of WEC events
- 2009 in WEC
