= WEC 37 =

WEC MMA event in 2008

WEC 37: Torres vs. Tapia
- The poster for WEC 37: Torres vs. Tapia
- Promotion: World Extreme Cagefighting
- Date: December 3, 2008
- Venue: Hard Rock Hotel and Casino
- City: Las Vegas, Nevada
- Attendance: 643
- Total gate: $90,125

Event chronology
WEC 36: Faber vs. Brown	WEC 37: Torres vs. Tapia	WEC 38: Varner vs. Cerrone

WEC 37: Torres vs. Tapia was a mixed martial arts event held by World Extreme Cagefighting on December 3, 2008, at the Hard Rock Hotel and Casino in Las Vegas, Nevada. The event aired live on the Versus Network.

== Background ==
Former IFL standout Wagnney Fabiano made his WEC debut on this card.

A welterweight contest between Blas Avena and the returning Kevin Knabjian was originally scheduled for the undercard of this event, but it was later cancelled.

The Mark Muñoz-Ricardo Barros fight was the final light heavyweight bout to be put on by the WEC. The division was absorbed into the UFC following this event.

The event drew an estimated 671,000 viewers on Versus.

== Results ==
Main card
Weight class				Method	Round	Time	Notes
Bantamweight	Miguel Torres (c)	def	Manny Tapia	TKO (punches)	2	3:04	(Note: For the Bantamweight Championship.)
Featherweight	Wagnney Fabiano	def	Akitoshi Tamura	Submission (arm-triangle choke)	3	4:48
Bantamweight	Brian Bowles	def	Will Ribeiro	Submission (guillotine choke)	3	1:11
Bantamweight	Joseph Benavidez	def	Danny Martinez	Decision (unanimous) (30–27, 30–27, 30–27)	3	5:00
Preliminary card
Welterweight	Johny Hendricks	def	Justin Haskins	TKO (strikes)	2	0:43
Light Heavyweight	Mark Muñoz	def	Ricardo Barros	TKO (strikes)	1	2:26
Featherweight	Diego Nunes	def	Cole Province	Decision (unanimous) (30–27, 30–27, 29–28)	3	5:00
Lightweight	Bart Palaszewski	def	Alex Karalexis	TKO (punches)	2	1:11
Featherweight	Cub Swanson	def	Hiroyuki Takaya	Decision (unanimous) (30–27, 30–27, 29–28)	3	5:00
Lightweight	Shane Roller	def	Mike Budnik	Submission (guillotine choke)	1	1:01

== Bonus Awards ==
Fighters were awarded $7,500 bonuses.

- Fight of the Night: (United States) Cub Swanson vs. (Japan) Hiroyuki Takaya
- Knockout of the Night: (Poland) Bart Palaszewski
- Submission of the Night: (United States) Brian Bowles

== Reported Payouts ==
The following is the reported payout to the fighters as reported to the Nevada State Athletic Commission. It does not include sponsor money or "locker room" bonuses often given by the WEC.

- Miguel Torres: $44,000 (includes $22,000 win bonus) def. Manny Tapia: $6,000
- Brian Bowles: $16,000 ($8,000 win bonus) def. Will Ribeiro: $4,000
- Wagnney Fabiano: $22,000 ($11,000 win bonus) def. Akitoshi Tamura: $6,000
- Joseph Benavidez: $17,000 ($8,500 win bonus) def. Danny Martinez: $2,000
- Johny Hendricks: $16,000 ($8,000 win bonus) def. Justin Haskins: $3,000
- Mark Muñoz: $20,000 ($10,000 win bonus) def. Ricardo Barros: $3,000
- Diego Nunes: $6,000 ($3,000 win bonus) def. Cole Province: $3,000
- Bart Palaszewski: $8,000 ($4,000 win bonus) def. Alex Karalexis: $8,000
- Cub Swanson: $10,000 ($5,000 win bonus) def. Hiroyuki Takaya: $5,500
- Shane Roller: $16,000 ($8,000 win bonus) def. Mike Budnik: $4,000

== See also ==
- World Extreme Cagefighting
- List of World Extreme Cagefighting champions
- List of WEC events
- 2008 in WEC
