= UFC on Fox: Teixeira vs. Evans =

UFC mixed martial arts event in 2016

- The poster for UFC on Fox: Teixeira vs. Evans
- Promotion: Ultimate Fighting Championship
- Date: April 16, 2016
- Venue: Amalie Arena
- City: Tampa, Florida
- Attendance: 11,273
- Total gate: $1,057,000

Event chronology
UFC Fight Night: Rothwell vs. dos Santos	UFC on Fox: Teixeira vs. Evans	UFC 197: Jones vs. Saint Preux

UFC on Fox: Teixeira vs. Evans (also known as UFC on Fox 19) was a mixed martial arts event held on April 16, 2016, at Amalie Arena in Tampa, Florida.

== Background ==
The event was the second that the organization has hosted in the Tampa Bay Area, and the first since UFC Fight Night: Lauzon vs. Stephens in February 2009.

It was expected to be headlined by a potential UFC Lightweight Championship title eliminator bout between undefeated Khabib Nurmagomedov and The Ultimate Fighter: Team Lesnar vs. Team dos Santos winner Tony Ferguson. The fight was previously scheduled for The Ultimate Fighter: Team McGregor vs. Team Faber Finale, but Nurmagomedov pulled out due to a rib injury. The fight was eventually rescheduled for this event. On April 5, it was announced that Ferguson pulled out of the bout due to a lung issue. Therefore, the Teixeira-Evans bout was elevated to a five-round main event status. Two days later, it was announced that Nurmagomedov would face promotional newcomer Darrell Horcher in a catchweight of 160 lb.

Maurício Rua was expected to face Rashad Evans in a bout between two former UFC Light Heavyweight Champions. The pairing was originally expected to meet in Rua's first title defense in March 2011 at UFC 128, but Evans pulled out due to a knee injury. Once again the bout did not materialize, as Rua pulled out of the fight on March 9 due to injury and was replaced by former title challenger Glover Teixeira.

Caio Magalhães was expected to face Cezar Ferreira at the event. Magalhães pulled out of the fight in the week leading up to the event citing an ankle injury and was replaced by Oluwale Bamgbose.

A rematch between former light heavyweight champion Lyoto Machida and former Pride Welterweight and Middleweight Champion as well as former Strikeforce Light Heavyweight Champion Dan Henderson was expected to take place at this event. Their first fight ended in a split decision win for Machida at UFC 157 in February 2013. However, on April 13, the UFC announced that Machida declared the usage of a banned substance during an out-of-competition sample collection last week. Machida stated that he was unaware that the substance was prohibited both in and out of competition and, in accordance with the UFC Anti-Doping Policy, his disclosure of usage will be taken into consideration by USADA during any potential results management and adjudication process. Therefore, he was removed from the bout and Henderson was re-booked for another event at a later date. He later released a statement announcing that he used a supplement which contains 7-Keto-DHEA. He also claimed ignorance in the situation and apologized for it, as well as accepting full responsibility for his actions.

After the weigh-ins, the UFC announced Islam Makhachev was informed by USADA of a potential anti-doping policy violation involving meldonium. Therefore, he received a provisional suspension and was removed from his scheduled bout against Drew Dober. Additional information will be provided at the appropriate time as the process moves forward.

== Results ==
Fight Card
Weight class				Method	Round	Time	Notes
Light Heavyweight	Glover Teixeira	def.	Rashad Evans	KO (punches)	1	1:48
Women's Strawweight	Rose Namajunas	def.	Tecia Torres	Decision (unanimous) (29–28, 29–28, 29–28)	3	5:00
Catchweight (160 lb)	Khabib Nurmagomedov	def.	Darrell Horcher	TKO (punches)	2	3:38
Featherweight	Cub Swanson	def.	Hacran Dias	Decision (unanimous) (29–28, 29–28, 29–28)	3	5:00
Preliminary Card (Fox)
Lightweight	Michael Chiesa	def.	Beneil Dariush	Submission (rear-naked choke)	2	1:20
Women's Bantamweight	Raquel Pennington	def.	Bethe Correia	Decision (split) (29–28, 28–29, 29–28)	3	5:00
Welterweight	Santiago Ponzinibbio	def.	Court McGee	TKO (punches)	1	4:15
Welterweight	Michael Graves	def.	Randy Brown	Submission (rear-naked choke)	2	2:31
Preliminary Card (UFC Fight Pass)
Bantamweight	John Dodson	def.	Manvel Gamburyan	TKO (punches)	1	0:47
Middleweight	Cezar Ferreira	def.	Oluwale Bamgbose	Decision (unanimous) (29–28, 29–28, 29–27)	3	5:00
Welterweight	Elizeu Zaleski dos Santos	def.	Omari Akhmedov	TKO (knees)	3	3:03

== Bonus awards ==
The following fighters were awarded $50,000 bonuses:

- Fight of the Night: Elizeu Zaleski dos Santos vs. Omari Akhmedov
- Performance of the Night: Glover Teixeira and Michael Chiesa

== Reported payout ==
The following is the reported payout to the fighters as reported to the Florida State Boxing Commission. It does not include sponsor money and also does not include the UFC's traditional "fight night" bonuses.

- Glover Teixeira: $120,000 (includes $60,000 win bonus) def. Rashad Evans: $150,000
- Rose Namajunas: $86,000 (includes $43,000 win bonus) def. Tecia Torres: $20,000
- Khabib Nurmagomedov: $48,000 (includes $24,000 win bonus) def. Darrell Horcher: $12,000
- Cub Swanson: $88,000 (includes $44,000 win bonus) def. Hacran Dias: $16,000
- Michael Chiesa: $66,000 (includes $33,000 win bonus) def. Beneil Dariush: $28,000
- Raquel Pennington: $40,000 (includes $20,000 win bonus) def. Bethe Correia: $25,000
- Santiago Ponzinibbio: $32,000 (includes $16,000 win bonus) def. Court McGee: $27,000
- Michael Graves: $24,000 (includes $12,000 win bonus) def. Randy Brown: $12,000
- John Dodson: $70,000 (includes $35,000 win bonus) def. Manvel Gamburyan: $33,000
- Cezar Ferreira: $48,000 (includes $24,000 win bonus) def. Oluwale Bamgbose: $12,000
- Elizeu Zaleski dos Santos: $20,000 (includes $10,000 win bonus) def. Omari Akhmedov: $18,000

== See also ==
- List of UFC events
- 2016 in UFC
