= WEC 40 =

World Extreme Cagefighting mixed martial arts event in 2009

WEC 40: Torres vs. Mizugaki
- The poster for WEC 40: Torres vs. Mizugaki
- Promotion: World Extreme Cagefighting
- Date: April 5, 2009
- Venue: UIC Pavilion
- City: Chicago, Illinois
- Attendance: 5,257

Event chronology
WEC 39: Brown vs. Garcia	WEC 40: Torres vs. Mizugaki	WEC 41: Brown vs. Faber 2

WEC 40: Torres vs. Mizugaki was a mixed martial arts event held by World Extreme Cagefighting on April 5, 2009 at the UIC Pavilion in Chicago, Illinois. The event aired live on the Versus Network.

== Background ==
This was the first WEC event to exclusively feature fights in the lightweight, featherweight, and bantamweight weight classes. The organization's heavier weight classes had been folded into the UFC over the previous four months. World Extreme Cagefighting would maintain this weight class structure for the remainder of the promotion's existence.

WEC Bantamweight Champion Miguel Torres was to defend his title against Brian Bowles at this event, but Bowles was forced to withdraw from the bout due to a back injury, and was replaced by WEC newcomer Takeya Mizugaki. The Torres/Bowles bout was rescheduled for WEC 42 that August, where Bowles won the title by knockout.

Early reports suggested that Wagnney Fabiano could face former WEC Featherweight Champion Urijah Faber at this event, though he was later confirmed to be facing Fredson Paixao instead.

Anthony Pettis was scheduled to make his WEC debut at this event against Anthony Njokuani, but was forced from the card with a broken hand and was replaced by Bart Palaszewski.

Cole Province was originally slated to face Rafael Dias at this event, but bowed out due to an injury and was replaced by Mike Budnik.

A featherweight bout between Cub Swanson and Diego Nunes was once scheduled for this card, but was cancelled after Nunes suffered a hand injury three days prior to the event.

The event drew an estimated 470,000 viewers on Versus.

== Results ==
Main card
Weight class				Method	Round	Time	Notes
Bantamweight	Miguel Torres (c)	def	Takeya Mizugaki	Decision (unanimous) (49–46, 49–46, 48–47)	5	5:00	(Note: For the WEC Bantamweight Championship.)
Bantamweight	Joseph Benavidez	def	Jeff Curran	Decision (unanimous) (30-27, 29-28, 29-28)	3	5:00
Lightweight	Benson Henderson	def	Shane Roller	TKO (punches)	1	1:41
Featherweight	Raphael Assunção	def	Jameel Massouh	Decision (unanimous) (30–27, 30–27, 30–27)	3	5:00
Preliminary card
Lightweight	Anthony Njokuani	def	Bart Palaszewski	TKO (punches)	2	0:27	(Note: This bout was featured on the main broadcast.)
Bantamweight	Dominick Cruz	def	Ivan Lopez	Technical Decision (unanimous) (30-27, 30-27, 29-28)	3	3:24	(Note: Cruz landed an illegal knee to the head of Lopez while he was on the ground at 3:24 of round 3. Since Lopez was unable to continue, the bout was stopped and went to the scorecards.)
Featherweight	Wagnney Fabiano	def	Fredson Paixao	Decision (unanimous) (30-27, 30-27, 30-27)	3	5:00
Bantamweight	Rani Yahya	def	Eddie Wineland	Submission (rear-naked choke)	1	1:07	(Note: This bout was featured on the main broadcast.)
Bantamweight	Akitoshi Tamura	def	Manny Tapia	Decision (unanimous) (29-28, 29-28, 29-28)	3	5:00
Featherweight	Rafael Dias	def	Mike Budnik	Decision (unanimous) (30-27, 29-28, 29-28)	3	5:00

== Bonus Awards ==
Fighters were awarded $10,000 bonuses.

- Fight of the Night: (United States) Miguel Torres vs. (Japan) Takeya Mizugaki
- Knockout of the Night: (Nigeria) Anthony Njokuani
- Submission of the Night: (Brazil) Rani Yahya

== See also ==
- World Extreme Cagefighting
- List of World Extreme Cagefighting champions
- List of WEC events
- 2009 in WEC
