= Kenda Perez =

American model and television host

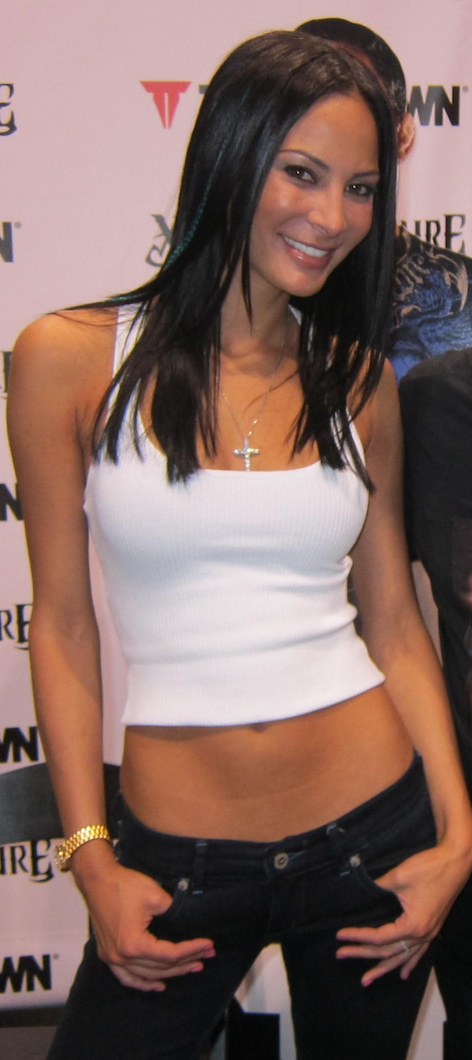
- Perez at the UFC Fan Expo in Toronto, April 29th, 2011.
- Born: Kenda Rae Perez; May 18, 1983 (age 43); Laguna Beach, California, U.S.
- Occupations: Model, Host (Best of PrideFC and Best of WEC, The Ultimate Show)
- Spouse: Cub Swanson (m. 2018)
- Modeling information
- Height: 5 ft 7 in (1.70 m)
- Hair color: Brown
- Eye color: Hazel
- Website: Official website

Kenda Perez (born May 18, 1983) is an American model and television host for the UFC and FOX Sports. She is the host of the internationally broadcast Best of Pride Fighting Championships, running four seasons, and the Best Of WEC on Fox Sports 1, running two seasons.

== Career ==
Kenda was discovered after entering Maxim magazine's Hometown Hotties competition. She was voted as a top four finalist and appeared in the magazine and website. Kenda has continued to work with Maxim Magazine on promotional events, including an appearance on the TV game show 1 vs. 100 and appearing in the magazine numerous times including the cover of the December 2012 issue.

=== UFC ===
In 2009, the UFC produced a new show called "The Best of Pride Fighting Championships." The program showcases some of the best fights, and fighters from Pride. Perez auditioned, and was hired as the host after impressing producers with her natural ability in front of the camera and behind the microphone. The first episode aired on January 15, 2010 on Spike TV. Season two debuted January 3, 2012 on Fuel TV in the United States. The third season aired on Fox Sports 2. She now currently hosts "The Best Of WEC" in its second season on Fox Sports 1.

=== The Ultimate Show (Bleacher Report) ===
She hosted a weekly online MMA show for BleacherReport.com called “The Ultimate Show” for two years, which debuted on August 4, 2011.

== In media ==
=== Magazine appearances ===
- Maxim Magazine - Dec 2007 // Oct 2012 // Dec 2012
- UFC Magazine - Aug/Sept 2010 // Oct 2011//Aug/Sept 2014 (Australia Edition)
- Muscle & Fitness - Jan 2011
- 944 magazine - June 2011 (O.C. Edition)
- Fight! Magazine - Aug 2011
- Maxim UK - Dec 2011 (Online Only)
- Fighters Only UK - Issue 84
- Inside Fitness - Aug/Sept 2012 (with Arianny Celeste and Brittney Palmer)

=== Features ===
- CNNSI's Hot Clicks "Lovely Lady of the Day" for August 4, 2010
- Bleacher Report's "MMA Hottie of the Week" on February 22, 2011
- CNNSI's Hot Clicks Photo Gallery of the Day for April 23, 2012
- Appears in UFC Undisputed 3 as a PRIDE ring girl.

== Personal life ==
Kenda was born in Laguna Beach California and grew up in old-town Orange while attending Orangewood Adventist Academy. She currently resides in Newport Beach, California. Her father, Ken Perez, holds a black belt in Shitō-ryū. Kenda and Cub Swanson were married June 1, 2018 and have a daughter and identical twin boys.
