= John Franchi =

American mixed martial arts fighter

- Born: July 16, 1982 (age 44); Elmira Heights, New York, United States
- Height: 5 ft 6 in (1.68 m)
- Weight: 145 lb (66 kg; 10.4 st)
- Division: Featherweight
- Fighting out of: Elmira NY
- Team: Fifth Round MMA

Mixed martial arts record
- Total: 8
- Wins: 6
- By knockout: 2
- By submission: 2
- By decision: 2
- Losses: 2
- By submission: 1
- By decision: 1

Other information
- Mixed martial arts record from Sherdog

John Franchi (born July 16, 1982) is a retired American mixed martial artist. He previously competed in WEC's featherweight division.

== Background ==
Franchi was a standout wrestler at Edison High School. He then went on to graduate from the State University of New York at Cortland where he earned a B.A. in Liberal Arts.

== MMA ==
His debut for WEC was a split-decision-win over Mike Budnik at WEC 39. He lost a unanimous decision to Manny Gamburyan at WEC 41.

Franchi was defeated by Cub Swanson on November 18, 2009 at WEC 44 in a bout which won Fight of the Night honors.

== Championships and accomplishments ==
- World Extreme Cagefighting
  - Fight of the Night (One time) vs. Cub Swanson

== Mixed martial arts record ==
Professional record breakdown
8 matches	6 wins	2 losses
By knockout	2	0
By submission	2	1
By decision	2	1

Res.	Record	Opponent	Method	Event	Date	Round	Time	Location	Notes
Win	6–2	Matt McCook	Decision (split)	RW 10: Mayhem in the Mist 5	November 6, 2010	3	5:00	Niagara Falls, New York, United States	
Loss	5–2	Cub Swanson	Submission (guillotine choke)	WEC 44	November 18, 2009	3	4:50	Las Vegas, Nevada, United States	Won Fight of the Night.
Loss	5–1	Manvel Gamburyan	Decision (unanimous)	WEC 41	June 7, 2009	3	5:00	Sacramento, California, United States	
Win	5–0	Mike Budnik	Decision (split)	WEC 39	March 1, 2009	3	5:00	Corpus Christi, Texas, United States	
Win	4–0	Frank Latina	Submission (rear-naked choke)	IFL: Connecticut	May 16, 2008	1	2:19	Uncasville, Connecticut, United States	
Win	3–0	Justin Homsey	TKO (elbows)	World Championship Fighting 2	February 8, 2008	2	0:40	Wilmington, Massachusetts, United States	
Win	2–0	Brian Conrad	Submission (armbar)	FFP: Untamed 18	December 15, 2007	1	2:15	Plymouth, Massachusetts, United States	
Win	1–0	Richard Miner	TKO	EFI: Battle in the Field	October 27, 2007	1	N/A	Springfield, Massachusetts, United States	

=== Kickboxing Record ===
Res.	Record	Opponent	Method	Event	Date	Round	Time	Location	Notes
Win	1–0	Keith Nesbitt	TKO (Fear)	Gladius Fights 39	February 1, 2020	1	0:00	Big Flats, NY, United States	Nesbitt did not show for weigh-ins.
