= Phil Cardella =

American mixed martial arts fighter

- Born: July 9, 1976 (age 50); Houston, Texas
- Height: 5 ft 11 in (1.80 m)
- Weight: 155 lb (70 kg; 11.1 st)
- Style: Brazilian Jiu-Jitsu
- Fighting out of: St. Augustine, Florida, United States
- Team: Relson Gracie Austin
- Rank: 3rd Degree Black Belt in Brazilian Jiu-Jitsu; 3rd Degree Black Belt in Taekwondo; 2nd Degree Black Belt in Hapkido

Mixed martial arts record
- Total: 13
- Wins: 8
- By knockout: 0
- By submission: 7
- By decision: 1
- Losses: 5
- Draws: 0
- No contests: 0

Other information
- Mixed martial arts record from Sherdog

Phil Ryan Cardella (born July 9, 1976) is an American mixed martial arts fighter. He formerly fought as a lightweight in the World Extreme Cagefighting organization. All but one of Cardella's triumphs have come by first-round submission.

He holds a 3rd degree black belt in Brazilian Jiu Jitsu under Relson Gracie, as well as a 3rd degree black belt in Taekwondo and a 2nd Degree black belt in Hapkido.

He served as an assault amphibious vehicle crewman in the United States Marine Corps from 1994 to 1998, during which he also taught primary marksmanship and combat water safety. Today he continues to work with various branches of the U.S. Military to train them in hand-to-hand combatives using Brazilian Jiu Jitsu.

Phil was the first American fighter to represent the Relson Gracie Team in MMA competition. Relson Gracie has been in Phil's corner during many of his MMA matches. Phil is the founder of the Relson Gracie Jiu-Jitsu associations in Texas, and has since moved to Florida to lead his team and community there as the Head Instructor of Relson Gracie Jiu-Jitsu Florida, a martial arts school specializing in Brazilian Jiu-Jitsu.

== WEC career ==
While his record for the WEC reads 0–2, Cardella was a winner in the minds of several fans and critics after his fight against Danny Castillo ended a split decision. In his fight with Castillo, he became the first fighter in the WEC to win more than one round on a judge's scorecard, purely by scoring points with an offensive guard. He made his WEC return at WEC 42 on August 9, 2009, losing to Ed Ratcliff by unanimous decision.

== Coaching ==
Cardella has been known to coach a number of professional MMA fighters, including UFC contender Kamal Shalorus, Strikeforce top title contender Tim Kennedy, former UFC star Roger Huerta, and Bellator fighter Chris Spicer.

== Mixed martial arts record ==
Professional record breakdown
13 matches	8 wins	5 losses
By knockout	0	2
By submission	7	1
By decision	1	2

Res.	Record	Opponent	Method	Event	Date	Round	Time	Location	Notes
Loss	8–5	Ran Weathers	KO (punch)	Shark Fights 6: Stars & Stripes	September 12, 2009	1	0:36	Amarillo, TX, United States	
Loss	8–4	Ed Ratcliff	Decision (unanimous)	WEC 42:Torres vs. Bowles	August 9, 2009	3	5:00	Las Vegas, Nevada, United States	
Win	8–3	Johnny Flores	Submission (armbar)	Shark Fights 4: Richards vs Schoonover	May 2, 2009	1	0:48	Lubbock, Texas, United States	
Loss	7–3	Danny Castillo	Decision (split)	WEC 39: Brown vs. Garcia	March 1, 2009	3	5:00	Corpus Christi, Texas, United States	
Win	7–2	Rafael Dias	Decision (unanimous)	GFC - Evolution	May 19, 2007	3	5:00	Columbus, Ohio, United States	
Win	6–2	Patrick Horner	Submission (armbar)	GFC - Team Gracie vs Team Hammer House	March 3, 2006	1	4:20	Columbus, Ohio, United States	
Loss	5–2	Steve Kinnison	KO (slam)	FFC 6 - No Love	July 11, 2003	1	1:35	Biloxi, Mississippi, United States	
Win	5–1	Rocky Long	Submission (armbar)	REF - Renegades Extreme Fighting	October 12, 2002	1	0:49	Houston, Texas, United States	
Win	4–1	Jose Santibanez	Submission (guillotine Choke)	REF - Renegades Extreme Fighting	October 12, 2002	1	0:27	Houston, Texas, United States	
Win	3–1	Richard Rosas	Submission (strikes)	WFC 2 - World Fighting Championships 2	August 16, 2002	1	N/A	El Paso, Texas, United States	
Win	2–1	Casey Erwin	Submission (triangle Choke)	WFC 1 - World Fighting Championships 1	June 26, 2002	1	N/A	San Antonio, Texas, United States	
Loss	1–1	Randall Ebarb	Submission (armbar)	REF - Renegades Extreme Fighting	November 17, 2001	1	1:02	Texas, United States	
Win	1–0	Chris Winchester	Submission (armbar)	REF - Renegades Extreme Fighting	November 17, 2001	1	0:24	Texas, United States	
