= Akitoshi Tamura =

Japanese martial artist

- Born: May 31, 1980 (age 46); Nishiwaki, Hyōgo Prefecture, Japan
- Other names: Ironman
- Nationality: Japanese
- Height: 174 cm (5 ft 9 in)
- Weight: 135 lb (61 kg; 9.6 st)
- Division: Bantamweight, Featherweight (formerly)
- Reach: 70 in (180 cm)
- Fighting out of: Hyogo, Japan
- Team: Tsudanuma Dojo

Mixed martial arts record
- Total: 37
- Wins: 19
- By knockout: 1
- By submission: 5
- By decision: 13
- Losses: 16
- By knockout: 2
- By submission: 2
- By decision: 11
- By disqualification: 1
- Draws: 2

Other information
- Mixed martial arts record from Sherdog

Akitoshi Tamura (born May 31, 1980) is a Japanese mixed martial artist. He competed almost exclusively in the Shooto organization, before making his debut in 2008 at the WEC 37. In 2007, he was the lightweight champion of Shooto. He was once ranked as the #5 Bantamweight in the world by the MMAWeekly Worldwide Ranking System. Tamura is a freestyle fighter. In 2004, Tamura became the first foreigner to beat a Burmese Lethwei fighter in an official match.

== Mixed martial arts career ==
Tamura made his professional debut in the Shooto organization in a fight against Eiji Murayama, in August 2001, and lost on a technical decision (he later returned to face Murayama in 2004, only for the match to end in a draw). He has made MMA headlines when he defeated Takeshi Inoue in 2007, which won him the title of Shooto lightweight champion. He has also participated in GCM and MARS events, achieving a TKO over Masaomi Saito in the former, and a first round submission over Ian Loveland in the latter.

Akitoshi Tamura made his WEC debut at WEC 37. Although Akitoshi had a reputation of being one of the world's best in his weight class, he lost to former IFL featherweight champion Wagnney Fabiano, for whom it was also his WEC debut. For his next fight, Tamura made his 135 lb. debut in the bantamweight division at WEC 40 against former world title challenger Manny Tapia. Tamura defeated Tapia by unanimous decision.

On October 10, 2009, he was scheduled to fight Damacio Page at WEC 43, but pulled out with an undisclosed injury. He was replaced in the bout by WEC newcomer Will Campuzano.

On January 10, 2010, Tamura was defeated by WEC veteran Charlie Valencia via split decision at WEC 46.

== Lethwei ==
Tamura competed in a Lethwei tournament on July 10 & 11, 2004 at the Thuwunna National Indoor Stadium in Yangon, Myanmar against Aye Bo Sein. The event also showcased three other Japanese fighters, Tamura, Yoshitaro Niimi, Takaharu Yamamoto and Seiji Wakasugi against Burmese fighters. The other Burmese fighters competing in the tournament were Naing Wan Lay, Win Tun and Shwe Sai.

Tamura knocked out local fighter Aya Bo Sein in the fourth round becoming the first foreigner to beat a Lethwei practitioner in an official match and received a challenge fight belt that was created specifically for the event.

== Lethwei record ==
Professional Lethwei record
1 win, 0 losses, 0 draws
Date	Result	Opponent	Event	Location	Method	Round
Jul 10, 2004	Win	(Myanmar) Aye Bo Sein	Myanmar vs. Japan Lethwei Challenge Fights	Yangon, Myanmar	KO	4
Legend: Win Loss Draw Notes

== Mixed martial arts record ==
Professional record breakdown
37 matches	19 wins	16 losses
By knockout	1	2
By submission	5	2
By decision	13	11
By disqualification	0	1
Draws	2	

Res.	Record	Opponent	Method	Event	Date	Round	Time	Location	Notes
Win	19–16–2	Satoshi Inaba	Decision (split)	Pancrase: 267	May 31, 2015	3	5:00	Tokyo, Japan	
Loss	18–16–2	Guy Delumeau	Decision (split)	Pancrase: 264	February 1, 2015	3	5:00	Tokyo, Japan	
Loss	18–15–2	Andy Main	TKO (punches)	Pancrase: 262	November 2, 2014	2	4:34	Tokyo, Japan	
Win	18–14–2	Motoshi Miyaji	Decision (unanimous)	Pancrase: 258	May 11, 2014	3	5:00	Tokyo, Japan	
Win	17–14–2	Brian Choi	Decision (majority)	Shooto: 4th Round 2013	September 29, 2013	3	5:00	Tokyo, Japan	
Loss	16–14–2	Yoshifumi Nakamura	Decision (unanimous)	Shooto: Gig Tokyo 14	April 21, 2013	3	5:00	Tokyo, Japan	
Loss	16–13–2	Yusuke Yachi	Decision (unanimous)	Shooto: 8th Round	July 16, 2012	3	5:00	Tokyo, Japan	
Loss	16–12–2	Yuji Hoshino	Decision (unanimous)	Shooto: 3rd Round	March 10, 2012	3	5:00	Tokyo, Japan	
Win	16–11–2	Shigeki Osawa	Decision (unanimous)	Shooto: Shooto the Shoot 2011	November 5, 2011	3	5:00	Tokyo, Japan	
Loss	15–11–2	Tetsu Suzuki	Submission (triangle kimura)	Shooto: Shootor's Legacy 3	July 18, 2011	3	2:45	Tokyo, Japan	
Loss	15–10–2	Taiyo Nakahara	DQ (low blows)	World Victory Road Presents: Soul of Fight	December 30, 2010	1	2:07	Tokyo, Japan	
Win	15–9–2	Shoko Sato	Decision (split)	World Victory Road Presents: Sengoku Raiden Championships 15	October 30, 2010	2	5:00	Tokyo, Japan	Asian Bantamweight Grand Prix Quarterfinal
Loss	14–9–2	Masakatsu Ueda	Decision (unanimous)	Shooto: The Way of Shooto 3: Like a Tiger, Like a Dragon	May 30, 2010	3	5:00	Tokyo, Japan	
Loss	14–8–2	Charlie Valencia	Decision (split)	WEC 46	January 10, 2010	3	5:00	Sacramento, California, USA	
Win	14–7–2	Manny Tapia	Decision (unanimous)	WEC 40	April 5, 2009	3	5:00	Chicago, Illinois, USA	Bantamweight debut
Loss	13–7–2	Wagnney Fabiano	Submission (arm-triangle choke)	WEC 37: Torres vs. Tapia	December 3, 2008	3	4:48	Las Vegas, Nevada, USA	WEC debut
Win	13–6–2	Rumina Sato	Submission (north-south choke)	Shooto: Shooto Tradition 1	May 3, 2008	3	2:37	Tokyo, Japan	
Loss	12–6–2	Hideki Kadowaki	Decision (majority)	Shooto: Back To Our Roots 8	March 28, 2008	3	5:00	Tokyo, Japan	Lost Shooto Lightweight (143 lbs.) Championship
Win	12–5–2	Takeshi Inoue	Decision (unanimous)	Shooto: Back To Our Roots 3	May 18, 2007	3	5:00	Tokyo, Japan	Won Shooto Lightweight (143 lbs.) Championship
Win	11–5–2	Tenkei Oda	Decision (unanimous)	Shooto: Back To Our Roots 1	February 17, 2007	3	5:00	Yokohama, Japan	
Win	10–5–2	Akiyo Nishiura	Decision (unanimous)	Shooto: Rookie Tournament Final	December 2, 2006	2	5:00	Tokyo, Japan	
Win	9–5–2	Sakae Kasuya	Submission (armbar)	Shooto 2006: 9/8 in Korakuen Hall	September 8, 2006	1	2:16	Tokyo, Japan	
Loss	8–5–2	Tenkei Oda	KO (punch)	Shooto: The Devilock	May 12, 2006	1	2:10	Tokyo, Japan	
Win	8–4–2	Masaomi Saito	TKO (knees)	GCM: D.O.G. 5	April 1, 2006	1	1:02	Tokyo, Japan	
Win	7–4–2	Ian Loveland	Submission (triangle choke)	Martial Arts Reality Superfighting	February 4, 2006	1	3:40	Tokyo, Japan	
Loss	6–4–2	Takeshi Inoue	Decision (majority)	Shooto 2005: 11/6 in Korakuen Hall	November 6, 2005	3	5:00	Tokyo, Japan	
Win	6–3–2	Hayate Usui	Technical Submission (rear-naked choke)	Shooto: 9/23 in Korakuen Hall	September 23, 2005	2	4:51	Tokyo, Japan	
Win	5–3–2	Fanjin Son	Decision (majority)	Shooto 2005: 7/30 in Korakuen Hall	July 30, 2005	2	5:00	Tokyo, Japan	
Loss	4–3–2	Hideki Kadowaki	Decision (unanimous)	Shooto: 3/11 in Korakuen Hall	March 11, 2005	2	5:00	Tokyo, Japan	
Win	4–2–2	Guseyn Aliev	Submission (armbar)	WAFC: Pankration Open Cup 2004	April 5, 2004	1	1:53	Khabarovsk, Russia	
Draw	3–2–2	Eiji Murayama	Draw	Shooto: 3/22 in Korakuen Hall	March 22, 2004	2	5:00	Tokyo, Japan	
Win	3–2–1	Yohei Nanbu	Decision (unanimous)	Shooto: Wanna Shooto 2003	November 3, 2003	2	5:00	Tokyo, Japan	
Win	2–2–1	Masatoshi Kobayashi	Decision (unanimous)	Shooto: 3/18 in Korakuen Hall	March 18, 2003	2	5:00	Tokyo, Japan	
Loss	1–2–1	Hiroshi Komatsu	Technical Decision (unanimous)	Shooto: Gig East 10	August 27, 2002	2	0:33	Tokyo, Japan	
Draw	1–1–1	Jin Kazeta	Draw	Shooto: Treasure Hunt 2	January 25, 2002	2	5:00	Tokyo, Japan	
Win	1–1–0	Koichi Tanaka	Decision (unanimous)	Shooto: GIG East 5	August 15, 2001	2	5:00	Tokyo, Japan	
Loss	0–1–0	Eiji Murayama	Technical Decision (unanimous)	Shooto: Wanna Shooto 2001	April 8, 2001	2	N/A	Tokyo, Japan	
