= Mike Brown (fighter) =

American mixed martial arts fighter

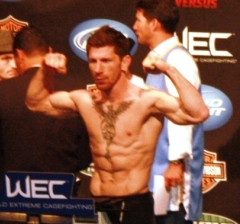
- Born: September 8, 1975 (age 51); Portland, Maine, U.S.
- Height: 5 ft 6 in (1.68 m)
- Weight: 145 lb (66 kg; 10.4 st)
- Division: Featherweight; Lightweight
- Reach: 70 in (180 cm)
- Fighting out of: Coconut Creek, Florida, U.S.
- Team: American Top Team
- Rank: Black belt in Brazilian jiu-jitsu
- Wrestling: NCAA Division III wrestling
- Years active: 2001–2014

Mixed martial arts record
- Total: 35
- Wins: 26
- By knockout: 5
- By submission: 13
- By decision: 8
- Losses: 9
- By knockout: 3
- By submission: 4
- By decision: 2

Other information
- University: Norwich University
- Notable school: Bonny Eagle High School
- Website: mikethomasbrown.com
- Mixed martial arts record from Sherdog
- Last updated on: February 16, 2011

Mike Thomas Brown (born September 8, 1975) is an American mixed martial arts trainer and former fighter who is the head MMA coach for American Top Team. As a mixed martial arts fighter, Brown was a former WEC Featherweight Champion and also competed in the Featherweight division of the UFC before retiring in 2014 to become a full-time MMA coach. He is the head coach for many current UFC and Bellator fighters, including Dustin Poirier, Alexandre Pantoja, Bo Nickal, Mateusz Gamrot, Renato Moicano, Danny Sabatello and Johnny Eblen.

== Background ==
Brown wrestled at Bonny Eagle High School in Standish, Maine, where he won a state championship in 1992, his junior year. He went on to wrestle at Norwich University, where he was known for his ability to focus. Although he was an average student in high school, he was able to apply his focus to academics and excelled as a scholar-athlete in college. According to Norwich wrestling coach Rich Hasenfus, Brown was one of the smartest athletes and strongest wrestlers at Norwich.

== Mixed martial arts career ==
=== Early career ===
Brown had fought in several MMA events including most recently WEC, where he was the Featherweight Champion. In 2005, Brown suffered a near career-ending loss at DEEP 22 in Japan. Brown's opponent, noted leg-lock expert Masakazu Imanari, dislocated Brown's leg to the point that his leg was pulled out and to the side of his knee joint. His only other pre-WEC losses were to world-class fighters; besides Imanari, only Joe Lauzon, Genki Sudo, and Hermes Franca (all UFC veterans) had defeated Brown en route to Brown's 18–4 record.

=== World Extreme Cagefighting ===
Riding a six-fight win streak, Mike Brown signed with the WEC's Featherweight division. His debut in the WEC was against Brazilian Jiu-jitsu expert Jeff Curran at WEC 34. In each round, Brown matched Curran's stand-up and then took him down and scored from the top with elbows and punches. Brown won all three rounds en route to a unanimous decision victory.

Brown was then offered a shot at the WEC Featherweight Championship with a fight against Urijah Faber at WEC 36. The fight was originally set to take place in Hollywood, Florida on September 10, 2008, but it was postponed to November 5, 2008, due to Hurricane Ike. At the time, Faber had held the title for over two and a half years and was widely considered to be the best fighter at 145 pounds in the world. Brown welcomed the opportunity to fight the best in the world and felt that his training with American Top Team had prepared him well. When the heavily-favored Faber attempted a risky elbow strike, Brown countered with a right hook to the jaw, knocking down the champion. Brown then followed with a flurry of unanswered punches and the fight was called off at 2:23 of the first round. Brown won by technical knockout and was declared the new WEC featherweight champion.

Brown's first title defense came against Texas-native Leonard Garcia in Corpus Christi, Texas as the main event of WEC 39. Garcia came out very aggressively, but he made a mistake and circled in the wrong direction. Brown capitalized on the mistake, knocking Garcia down with a big right hand. He followed with a barrage of punches and elbows, one of which opened up a cut on Garcia's forehead. Brown took Garcia's back and worked unsuccessfully for a rear-naked choke. Garcia got Brown back in his guard, but Brown passed into a full mount and secured an arm-triangle choke. Garcia tapped out at 1:57 of the first round. Brown said that he did not really feel like the champion after the Faber fight, but he was happy he established himself as the champion with his victory over Garcia.

Brown's second defense came in a rematch against former champ Urijah Faber as the main event of WEC 41: Brown vs. Faber 2. The bout took place at ARCO Arena on June 7, 2009, in Sacramento, California.

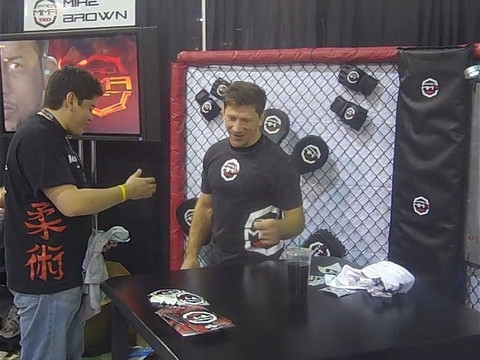
At the UFC 100 Fan Expo event in Las Vegas, July 2009

Urijah Faber was defeated a second time by Brown via unanimous decision in front of his hometown crowd in Sacramento. The score cards read 49–46, 48–47 and 49–46, all in favor of Brown, solidifying him as the best Featherweight in the world. MMA websites Sherdog.com and ESPN.com both stated that "Faber's right hand was no match for the top of Mike Brown's head".

Following his unanimous Dec win over Faber (for the second time), Brown lost his WEC Featherweight Championship against José Aldo on November 18, 2009, at WEC 44. Brown lost by knockout in the second round.

Brown defeated WEC newcomer Anthony Morrison on January 10, 2010, at WEC 46 via first round submission.

Brown took on Manvel Gamburyan on April 24, 2010, at WEC 48. Gamburyan defeated Brown via KO in the first round.

Mike Brown's next fight was against Cole Province at WEC 51. He won the fight via TKO (punches) in the first round.

=== Return to Ultimate Fighting Championship ===
On October 28, 2010, World Extreme Cagefighting merged with the Ultimate Fighting Championship. As part of the merger, all WEC fighters were transferred to the UFC.

Brown first faced Diego Nunes on January 1, 2011, at UFC 125. He lost the fight via split decision.

Brown jumped right back into action to face Rani Yahya on January 22, 2011, at UFC Fight Night 23, replacing an injured Chan Sung Jung. He lost the fight via unanimous decision.

Brown was out until mid-2011 recovering from surgery on his hand that was injured during the Yahya bout. On August 6, 2011, Brown faced Nam Phan at UFC 133. He won the fight via unanimous decision, earning him his first UFC victory.

Brown was expected to face Vagner Rocha on January 20, 2012, at UFC on FX 1. However, Brown was forced out of the bout with a knee injury.

Brown faced Daniel Pineda on May 26, 2012, at UFC 146. He defeated Pineda by unanimous decision. In an interview with Ariel Helwani following the fight, Brown stated that he would give himself two weeks to consider retiring based on how his body felt after recovering. On July 4, 2012, Brown signed a 5-fight deal with the UFC.

Brown was expected to face Akira Corassani on August 17, 2013, at UFC Fight Night 26. However, Corassani pulled out of the bout and was replaced by Steven Siler. Brown lost the fight via knockout in the first round.

Brown was expected to face Estevan Payan on April 19, 2014, at UFC on Fox 11. However, Brown was forced out of the bout with an injury and was replaced by promotional newcomer Alex White.

After pulling out of the fight against Payan, Brown said he would likely not fight again, though he did not say he was retiring.

== Championships and accomplishments ==
- World Extreme Cagefighting
  - WEC Featherweight Championship (One time)
    - Two successful title defenses
  - Fight of the Night (One time)
  - Knockout of the Night (One time)
  - Submission of the Night (One time)
- Absolute Fighting Championships
  - AFC Featherweight Championship (One time)
- Sports Illustrated
  - 2008 Upset of the Year vs. Urijah Faber at WEC 36
- Combat Press
  - 2016 Coach of the Year
  - 2017 Coach of the Year
  - 2018 Coach of the Year
- World MMA Awards
  - 2018 The Shawn Tompkins Coach of the Year
  - 2023 The Shawn Tompkins Coach of the Year

== Mixed martial arts record ==
Professional record breakdown
35 matches	26 wins	9 losses
By knockout	5	3
By submission	13	4
By decision	8	2

Res.	Record	Opponent	Method	Event	Date	Round	Time	Location	Notes
Loss	26–9	Steven Siler	KO (punches)	UFC Fight Night: Shogun vs. Sonnen	August 17, 2013	1	0:50	Boston, Massachusetts, United States	
Win	26–8	Daniel Pineda	Decision (unanimous)	UFC 146	May 26, 2012	3	5:00	Las Vegas, Nevada, United States	
Win	25–8	Nam Phan	Decision (unanimous)	UFC 133	August 6, 2011	3	5:00	Philadelphia, Pennsylvania, United States	
Loss	24–8	Rani Yahya	Decision (unanimous)	UFC: Fight for the Troops 2	January 22, 2011	3	5:00	Fort Hood, Texas, United States	
Loss	24–7	Diego Nunes	Decision (split)	UFC 125	January 1, 2011	3	5:00	Las Vegas, Nevada, United States	
Win	24–6	Cole Province	TKO (punches)	WEC 51	September 30, 2010	1	1:18	Broomfield, Colorado, United States	
Loss	23–6	Manvel Gamburyan	KO (punches)	WEC 48	April 24, 2010	1	2:22	Sacramento, California, United States	
Win	23–5	Anthony Morrison	Submission (rear-naked choke)	WEC 46	January 10, 2010	1	1:54	Sacramento, California, United States	
Loss	22–5	José Aldo	TKO (punches)	WEC 44	November 18, 2009	2	1:20	Las Vegas, Nevada, United States	Lost the WEC Featherweight Championship.
Win	22–4	Urijah Faber	Decision (unanimous)	WEC 41	June 7, 2009	5	5:00	Sacramento, California, United States	Defended the WEC Featherweight Championship. Fight of the Night.
Win	21–4	Leonard Garcia	Submission (arm-triangle choke)	WEC 39	March 1, 2009	1	1:57	Corpus Christi, Texas, United States	Defended the WEC Featherweight Championship. Submission of the Night.
Win	20–4	Urijah Faber	TKO (punches)	WEC 36: Faber vs. Brown	November 5, 2008	1	2:23	Hollywood, Florida, United States	Won the WEC Featherweight Championship. Knockout of the Night.
Win	19–4	Jeff Curran	Decision (unanimous)	WEC 34: Faber vs. Pulver	June 1, 2008	3	5:00	Sacramento, California, United States	
Win	18–4	Manny Reyes Jr.	Submission (rear-naked choke)	PXF: Premier X-treme Fighting	December 8, 2007	1	1:46	Hollywood, Florida, United States	
Win	17–4	Eben Oroz	TKO (punches)	HOOKnSHOOT: BodogFIGHT	November 24, 2007	1	3:15	Evansville, Indiana, United States	
Win	16–4	Yves Edwards	Decision (unanimous)	BodogFIGHT: Clash of the Nations	December 16, 2006	3	5:00	Saint Petersburg, Russia	Lightweight bout.
Win	15–4	Jason Bryant	TKO (punches)	AFC 19: Absolute Fighting Championships 19	October 21, 2006	1	1:26	Boca Raton, Florida, United States	
Win	14–4	Rocky Long	Submission (rear-naked choke)	KE: Kick Enterprises	September 9, 2006	2	1:32	Fort Myers, Florida, United States	
Win	13–4	Dustin Neace	Submission (guillotine choke)	AFC 18: Absolute Fighting Championships 18	August 26, 2006	1	0:50	Boca Raton, Florida, United States	
Loss	12–4	Masakazu Imanari	Technical Submission (rolling kneelock)	DEEP: 22 Impact	December 2, 2005	2	3:38	Tokyo, Japan	DEEP Featherweight Tournament Semifinal.
Win	12–3	Takeshi Yamazaki	Decision (unanimous)	DEEP: 21st Impact	October 28, 2005	3	5:00	Tokyo, Japan	DEEP Featherweight Tournament Quarterfinal.
Win	11–3	Taiyo Nakahara	Submission (arm-triangle choke)	GCM: D.O.G. 2	June 11, 2005	2	N/A	Tokyo, Japan	
Win	10–3	Renato Tavares	Decision (unanimous)	AFC 10: Absolute Fighting Championships 10	October 30, 2004	3	5:00	Ft. Lauderdale, Florida, United States	Defended the AFC Featherweight Championship.
Loss	9–3	Joe Lauzon	Submission (rear-naked choke)	CZ 8: Street Justice	October 2, 2004	3	2:14	Revere, Massachusetts, United States	For the vacant USKBA U.S. Super Welterweight Championship.
Loss	9–2	Genki Sudo	Submission (triangle armbar)	UFC 47	April 2, 2004	1	3:31	Las Vegas, Nevada, United States	Lightweight bout.
Win	9–1	Leigh Remedios	Decision (unanimous)	AFC 6: Absolute Fighting Championships 6	December 6, 2003	3	5:00	Ft. Lauderdale, Florida, United States	Won the AFC Featherweight Championship.
Win	8–1	Renat Mirzabekov	Submission (heel hook)	HFC 2: Hardcore Fighting Championships 2	October 18, 2003	1	2:38	Revere, Massachusetts, United States	
Win	7–1	Mark Hominick	Submission (heel hook)	TFC 8: Hell Raiser	June 6, 2003	3	N/A	Toledo, Ohio, United States	
Win	6–1	Shawn Graham	TKO (punches)	HFC 1: Hardcore Fighting Championships 1	May 24, 2003	2	1:05	Revere, Massachusetts, United States	
Win	5–1	Mike Large	Submission (rear-naked choke)	TFC 7: Fightzone 7	February 28, 2003	1	N/A	Toledo, Ohio, United States	
Win	4–1	Bill Mahoney	Submission (rear-naked choke)	MD 10: Mass Destruction 10	January 25, 2003	3	N/A	Swansea, Massachusetts, United States	
Win	3–1	Edward Odquina	Submission (rear-naked choke)	USMMA 1: Ring of Fury	May 18, 2002	1	N/A	Lowell, Massachusetts, United States	
Loss	2–1	Hermes França	Submission (triangle choke)	HOOKnSHOOT: Kings 1	November 17, 2001	1	2:21	Evansville, Indiana, United States	Lightweight bout.
Win	2–0	Vinny Brightman	Submission (rear-naked choke)	MD3: Mass Destruction 3	August 4, 2001	1	3:30	Swansea, Massachusetts, United States	
Win	1–0	Jeff Darienzo	Submission (americana)	MD1: Mass Destruction 1	April 1, 2001	1	2:15	Swansea, Massachusetts, United States	

== See also ==
- List of male mixed martial artists

Preceded by Urijah Faber	3rd WEC Featherweight Champion; November 5, 2008 – November 18, 2009	Succeeded by José Aldo
