= Cub Swanson =

American mixed martial arts fighter (born 1983)

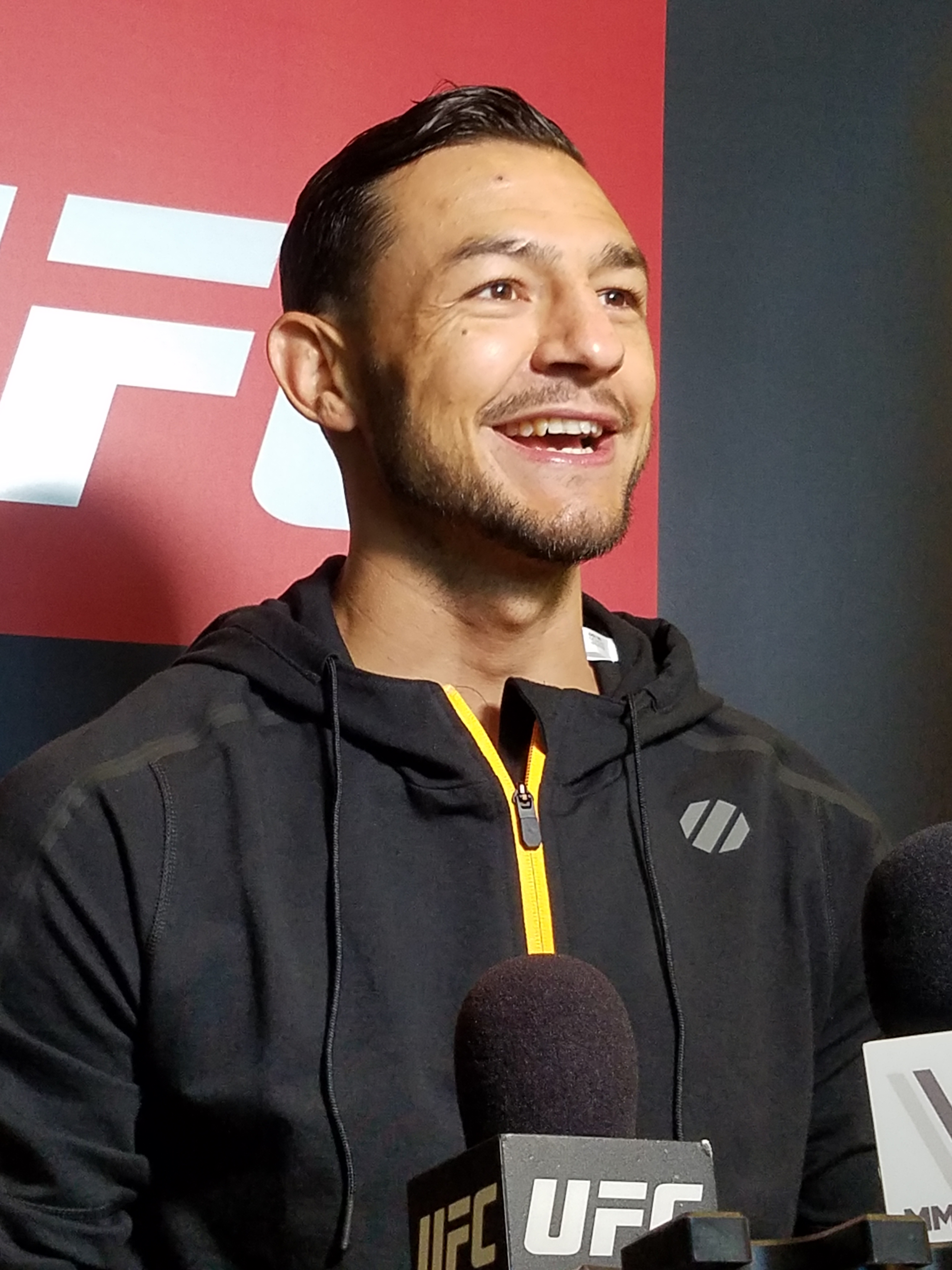
- Swanson at UFC Fight Night 108 in Nashville, Tennessee in April 2017
- Born: Kevin Luke Swanson; November 2, 1983 (age 43); Palm Springs, California, U.S.
- Nickname: Cub/Killer
- Height: 5 ft 8 in (173 cm)
- Weight: 145 lb (66 kg; 10 st 5 lb)
- Division: Bantamweight (2022); Featherweight (2006–2021, 2023–2026); Lightweight (2004–2006)
- Reach: 70 in (178 cm)
- Fighting out of: Palm Springs, California, U.S.
- Team: Jackson Wink MMA (until 2018); The Treigning Lab (2017–2019); UFC GYM Costa Mesa (2017–present)
- Trainer: Greg Jackson; Joel Díaz; Rigan Machado
- Rank: Black belt in Brazilian Jiu-Jitsu under Rigan Machado
- Years active: 2004–2026

Mixed martial arts record
- Total: 45
- Wins: 31
- By knockout: 15
- By submission: 4
- By decision: 12
- Losses: 14
- By knockout: 3
- By submission: 7
- By decision: 4

Other information
- Spouse: Kenda Perez
- Children: 3
- Website: cubswanson.com
- Mixed martial arts record from Sherdog

Kevin Luke "Cub" Swanson (born November 2, 1983) is an American former professional mixed martial artist. He competed in the Featherweight division of the Ultimate Fighting Championship (UFC). A professional from 2004 to 2026, Swanson holds the record for the most post-fight bonus awards in UFC Featherweight division history with eleven. In his combined UFC and WEC tenure he has been awarded with post-fight honors a total of fifteen times.

== Background ==
Swanson was born and raised mostly in Palm Springs, California, on November 2, 1983. He had a Swedish father and a Mexican mother. His widely used nickname Cub originates from his early childhood, as his brother could not say Swanson's real name and opted to call him Cub. Swanson has two older brothers, Steve and Aaron, and two sisters, one of whom has Down syndrome. Swanson's father died of melanoma three months after he was born. Because of his mother's heavy grieving and subsequent drug addiction, Swanson and his siblings were then adopted and raised by their father's cousin. The adoptive family was religious so Swanson spent most of his early life in church. Swanson was also homeschooled for most of his young life. Swanson started playing soccer at the age of four, dreaming of a professional career and playing in the World Cup. He and his oldest brother Steve excelled in soccer, winning the majority of the AYSO tournaments they attended in their age divisions.

Eventually, when Swanson was 14, his adoptive parents divorced and he returned to his mother who at the time had recovered from the addiction. Swanson then attended Cathedral City High School, along with future boxer Timothy Bradley. At the time, Swanson associated himself with local gangs and participated in many streets fights. He also drank alcohol and took recreational drugs. The police arrested Swanson and two of his friends for committing a house robbery. As a result, Swanson was placed in a juvenile detention center. He was released when he was 17 years old. At the age of 19, Swanson started working for United Cerebral Palsy, where he helped children with disabilities. UFC fighter Joe Stevenson invited Swanson to train with him, which he accepted. This marked Swanson's transition into professional MMA.

== Mixed martial arts career ==
=== Early career ===
On July 25, 2004, Swanson made his first professional fight. MMA was not sanctioned in California in 2004, so Swanson competed at Total Combat in Mexico. His opponent, Shannon Gugerty, submitted Swanson via Rear-Naked Choke. The fight lasted for just 30 seconds. Despite the loss, Swanson continued to compete in professional MMA fights. Swanson won nine fights before entering the WEC in 2007. This included a rematch with Gugerty in 2006. Other than TC, Swanson also competed in KOTC and BIB.

=== World Extreme Cagefighting ===
==== 2007 ====
On his WEC debut on March 24, 2007, Swanson submitted Tommy Lee by guillotine choke. Swanson earned a disclosed pay of $6000. He next defeated Micah Miller at WEC 28 via unanimous decision. Swanson was scheduled to fight Jens Pulver in Pulvers 145lb debut, the fight was pushed back three months when Pulver sustained an injury in training camp; Swanson accused Pulver of trying to duck the fight, which Pulver denied. They finally met at WEC 31, with Swanson losing via guillotine choke. The fight only lasted 35 seconds and marked the end of Swanson's eleven-fight winning streak.

==== 2008 ====
Hiroyuki Takaya took on Swanson on December 3, 2008, at WEC 37. Swanson won via unanimous decision. Both fighters earned the Fight of the Night honors. This was Swanson's first official WEC award.

==== 2009 ====
WEC scheduled Swanson to fight Diego Nunes on April 5, 2009, at WEC 40. Nunes withdrew from the fight days before the bout due to a hand injury.

Swanson fought with José Aldo at WEC 41 on June 7. Just 8 seconds into the first round, Swanson lost by TKO via a double flying knee. Nevertheless, WEC gave Swanson a disclosed pay of $8940 Base.

Swanson defeated John Franchi via submission on November 18 at WEC 44. The fight earned Swanson his second Fight of the Night honor. In his bout against Franchi, Swanson broke both of his hands.

==== 2010 ====
WEC scheduled Swanson to fight WEC newcomer Chan Sung Jung. Swanson withdrew from the card with an injury. He would be replaced by Leonard Garcia.

On August 18, 2010, WEC 50, Swanson faced Chad Mendes. Mendes came from a wrestling background. He took Swanson down multiple times throughout the fight. Swanson lost via unanimous decision.

Swanson faced Mackens Semerzier next on November 11 at WEC 52. He won the fight via split decision. The bout was an exciting back and forth affair that earned both fighters Fight of the Night honors.

==== 2011 ====
On October 28, 2011, WEC merged with Ultimate Fighting Championship. As part of the merger, most WEC fighter contracts transferred to UFC.

=== Ultimate Fighting Championship ===
==== 2011 ====
Swanson was expected to face Erik Koch on March 3, 2011, at UFC Live: Sanchez vs. Kampmann. However, Swanson pulled out of the bout due to an injury. Swanson vs. Koch was rescheduled to take place on July 2 at UFC 132. However, Swanson was forced out of the bout with another injury.

After just over a year out of action, Swanson returned to face Ricardo Lamas on November 12 at UFC on Fox 1. Swanson was the last WEC fighter imported from the WEC/UFC merger to debut in the UFC. He lost the fight via submission (arm-triangle choke) in the second round.

==== 2012 ====
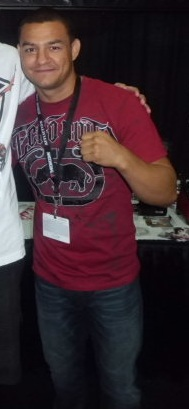
Cub Swanson in 2012

In his second UFC fight, Swanson faced George Roop on January 28, 2012, at UFC on Fox: Evans vs. Davis. Prior the fight, Swanson said "I just really want to smash this kid". He boasted "I'm the more complete fighter and I have the tools to shut him down". Swanson won the fight via TKO in the second round.

Ross Pearson and Swanson went head-to-head on June 22 at UFC on FX 4. Swanson won the fight via TKO in the second round, earning him Knockout of the Night bonus. Swanson fought Charles Oliveira as an underdog on September 22 at UFC 152. Swanson won the fight by knockout in the first round. Swanson received a Knockout of the Night bonus.

==== 2013 ====
Swanson was expected to face Dennis Siver on February 16, 2013, at UFC on Fuel TV: Barão vs. McDonald. However, Siver pulled out of the bout. Dustin Poirier took Siver's spot. Swanson won by unanimous decision. As of March 2013, Swanson was ranked the #10 Featherweight in the world by Sherdog and ranked #5 within the UFC. Swanson's bout with Dennis Siver was rescheduled for July 6, 2013, at UFC 162, as the first fight of his new five-fight contract. Swanson won via TKO in the third round. The performance earned both participants Fight of the Night honors.

==== 2014 ====
Swanson challenged Jeremy Stephens on June 28 at UFC Fight Night 44. Swanson won via unanimous decision. The performance earned both participants Fight of the Night honors.

Swanson next faced Frankie Edgar on November 22 at UFC Fight Night 57. Prior the fight, UFC president Dana White promised that "If Cub Swanson wins this fight, we did tell him we would give him a title shot." "All I know is that," Swanson told Sherdog.com, "in my mind, I finish Frankie Edgar, that I'm getting that title shot. That's all that's on my mind.". Swanson lost the one-sided fight via submission in closing seconds of the fifth round.

==== 2015 ====
Max Holloway challenged Swanson on April 18, 2015, at UFC on Fox 15. Swanson was out-struck in the first two rounds. Holloway then set up a guillotine choke in the third round, forcing Swanson to tap out. Following the fight, Swanson announced via Twitter that he had suffered a broken jaw and a broken right hand. The two-loss-streak made Swanson drop out as a title contender. "It's really hard to explain," said Swanson in an interview, "You want something so bad and it may come and it may not, you can go crazy doing all of that."

==== 2016 ====
In his tenth UFC fight, Swanson faced Hacran Dias on April 16, 2016, at UFC on Fox 19. Swanson won the fight via unanimous decision.

Swanson faced Tatsuya Kawajiri on August 6 at UFC Fight Night 92. "I've been around forever, he's been around forever, so we're both just looking for a win," said Swanson in an interview. During the fight, Swanson kneed Kawajiri to the head, which was illegal since Kawajiri was downed at the time. Referee John McCarthy paused the fight shortly but no points are deducted from Swanson. Swanson won the back and forth fight via unanimous decision.

Swanson fought with touted prospect Choi Doo-ho on December 10, 2016, at UFC 206. Swanson won the fight via unanimous decision. "I knew he (Choi) deserved the hype," said Swanson during the post-fight interview, "but he made a mistake calling me out. I wanted to prove to everyone that I've still got it. Don't write me off again." Both participants were awarded Fight of the Night and later was awarded Fight of the Year at the World MMA Awards. During UFC 273 broadcast in April 2022 it was announced that the fight will be inducted to the UFC Hall of Fame Fight Wing class of 2022.

==== 2017 ====
Underdog Artem Lobov challenged Swanson to a fight on April 22, 2017, at UFC Fight Night 108. Swanson won the fight via unanimous decision . The fight broke the record for most significant strikes landed (209) in a UFC Featherweight bout and in a UFC Fight Night at the time. It also came #4 in most significant strikes landed in a single bout, although the records have since been surpassed. Subsequently, both participants were awarded a Fight of the Night awards. This was Swanson's sixth Fight of the Night bonus. He broke his hand for the 10th time in his career.

Swanson faced Brian Ortega on December 9, 2017, at UFC Fight Night 123. He lost the fight via submission in the second round. Despite the loss, Swanson earned his third consecutive (and fifth overall) Fight of the Night bonus award. The fight with Ortega also marked the last bout of his contract and albeit taking offers from a variety of promotions, he decided to re-sign with the UFC due to consistent drug testing by USADA.

==== 2018 ====
Swanson faced Frankie Edgar in a rematch on April 21, 2018, at UFC Fight Night 128. He lost the fight via unanimous decision.

Swanson faced Renato Moicano on August 4, 2018, at UFC 227. He lost the fight via a rear-naked choke submission in the first round.

==== 2019 ====
Swanson faced Shane Burgos on May 4, 2019, at UFC Fight Night 151. He lost the fight by split decision.

Swanson faced Kron Gracie on October 12, 2019, at UFC on ESPN+ 19. The days leading to the bout saw a media clash between the fighters, as Swanson claimed several Brazilian jiu-jitsu gyms had refused him entry after learning he was going to fight a member of the Gracie family, to which Gracie answered supporting those views and criticizing Swanson's work ethic. Swanson won the fight via unanimous decision. This win earned him the Fight of the Night bonus award.

On December 12, 2019, Swanson competed at Quintet Ultra as part of Team WEC. In his bout with Jake Shields he tore his ACL, meniscus in his left knee. Swanson stated UFC paid his medical costs.

==== 2020 ====
Swanson faced Daniel Pineda on December 12, 2020, at UFC 256. He won the fight via knockout in the second round, marking his first finish since July 2013.

==== 2021 ====
Swanson was briefly linked to a bout against Gavin Tucker on May 1, 2021, at UFC on ESPN: Reyes vs. Procházka. However, Tucker was tabbed as a short notice replacement to face Dan Ige at UFC Fight Night: Edwards vs. Muhammad instead. Swanson instead faced Giga Chikadze. He lost the fight via TKO in the first round.

Swanson faced Darren Elkins on December 18, 2021, at UFC Fight Night: Lewis vs. Daukaus. He won the bout via TKO in the first round. This win earned him the Performance of the Night bonus award. Having one bout left in his prevailing contract, Swanson signed a new four-fight contract following the bout.

==== 2022 ====
Swanson faced Jonathan Martinez in Swanson's bantamweight debut on October 15, 2022 at UFC Fight Night 212. He lost the fight via technical knockout in round two.

==== 2023 ====
Swanson returned to face Hakeem Dawodu in his return to the Featherweight division on August 12, 2023, at UFC on ESPN: Luque vs. dos Anjos. He won the fight by controversial unanimous decision. 11 of 13 media outlets scored the contest for Dawodu.

==== 2024 ====
Swanson faced Andre Fili on June 29, 2024, at UFC 303. He lost the fight by split decision. 13 out of 15 media outlets scored the bout for Swanson. This fight earned him another Fight of the Night award.

Swanson faced Billy Quarantillo on December 14, 2024 at UFC on ESPN 63. He won the fight via a one-two punch knockout in the third round. This fight earned him another Fight of the Night award.

==== 2026 ====
In his retirement fight, Swanson faced Nate Landwehr on April 11, 2026 at UFC 327. He won the fight via technical knockout in the first round and laid down his gloves after the bout, signaling his retirement from mixed martial arts.

== Fighting style ==
Many MMA media outlets say that Cub Swanson is one of the most entertaining MMA fighters. MMA junkie reported "Swanson is a man who will give you a gritty, exciting fight". Bloodyelbow.com comments "Cub's style tends to be wild, unpredictable, and very explosive". Swanson has 10 fight night bonuses for UFC/WEC featherweight bouts. This is the highest in combined divisional history. MMAfighting.com calls Swanson "an exciting fighter". MMA fans call Swanson's style "Beautiful Destruction"

Swanson is known for his creative striking. Many pundits cite Swanson's ducking roundhouse kick or cartwheel kick to the head as his most distinct move. Swanson often sets up with a left hook, then follow up with a ducking roundhouse kick to the head. This combination was used against Artem Lobov. In other cases, Swanson would throw a single ducking roundhouse kick with no set up, like in his fight with Ross Pearson and Doo Ho Choi.

Swanson's movements are very unorthodox. He tends to feint while punching, as exemplified in WEC 52. Swanson often switches stance after kicking, something which he did against Dennis Siver. He also puts a lot of weight into his punches. Weight shifts give him more power but shift him off balance. This makes Swanson susceptible to take-downs and counters. Similarly, Swanson's stance switches make him vulnerable to leg kicks. Low kicks tend to disrupt his footwork.

In his fight with Doo Ho Choi and Dennis Siver, Swanson escaped from inferior positions. Despite this, 7 out of Swanson's 11 losses are by submission however since these losses he was highly praised for his takedown defence against world class jiu-jitsu fighter Kron Gracie at UFC Fight Night: Joanna vs. Waterson in 2019. Swanson stated on his UFC profile that Superman double wrist lock is his favorite move.

Swanson stated that Bruce Lee inspired him as a fighter.

== Training ==
Swanson began training MMA in 2003. His typical workout routine involves striking in the morning and cardio exercises in the afternoon. Grappling sessions take place at night. Brazilian Jiu-Jitsu medalist Rigan Machado coaches Swanson's BJJ. Former boxing champion Joel Díaz teaches Swanson boxing.

== Coaching ==
Cub Swanson owns an MMA gym, Tru MMA, in Indio, California.

Swanson also co-owns a UFC Gym in Costa Mesa with Michael Bisping. Swanson taught intermediate MMA classes at the UFC Gym on May 10, 2017. Classes included Boxing, kickboxing and Brazilian Jiu-Jitsu. "As a native of Southern California," remarked Swanson on the UFC website, "I look forward to bringing this community, which is both near and dear to my heart, a myriad of amazing amenities and programs to help them TRAIN different and live a healthier lifestyle." Eventually, Swanson started attending training camps over at his own gym.

== Personal life ==
Swanson married Kenda Perez on June 1, 2018. The two had their first child, Royal Rae Swanson, on August 21, 2017. Their identical twin sons, Saint Cub Swanson and King Cub Swanson, were born on September 2, 2018.

Steve Swanson, Cub Swanson's older brother, also competes in MMA. The two brothers train in and run their MMA gym, Tru Gym, together.

In his spare time, Swanson plays golf near his hometown at Indio, California. Golf club design enterprise PowerBilt sponsors Swanson.

== Filmography ==
=== Television ===
Year	Title	Role	Notes
2014	Kingdom	MMA fighter	Guest appearance in season 1 episode 1
2018	Gleichschaltung		Pre-production

=== Video games ===
Year	Title	Role	Notes
2012	UFC Undisputed 3	Himself	Playable character
2014	EA Sports UFC	Himself	Playable character
2016	EA Sports UFC 2	Himself	Playable character
2018	EA Sports UFC 3	Himself	Playable character
2020	EA Sports UFC 4	Himself	Playable character
2023	EA Sports UFC 5	Himself	Playable character

== Championships & accomplishments ==
=== Mixed martial arts ===
- Ultimate Fighting Championship
  - UFC Hall of Fame (Fight Wing, Class of 2022) vs. Doo Ho Choi at UFC 206
  - Performance of the Night (One time) vs. Darren Elkins
  - Fight of the Night (Eight times) vs. Dennis Siver, Jeremy Stephens, Doo Ho Choi, Artem Lobov, Brian Ortega, Kron Gracie, Andre Fili and Billy Quarantillo
    - Tied (Frankie Edgar & Nate Diaz) for fourth most Fight of the Night bonuses in UFC history (8)
    - Most Fight of the Night bonuses in UFC/WEC history (12)
  - Knockout of the Night (Two times) vs. Ross Pearson and Charles Oliveira
    - Most Post-Fight bonuses in UFC Featherweight division history (11)
    - Most Post-Fight bonuses in UFC/WEC Featherweight division history (15)
  - Tied (Josh Emmett) for most knockdowns in UFC Featherweight division history (12)
  - Second most knockouts in UFC Featherweight division history (8) (behind Max Holloway)
  - Second most finishes in UFC Featherweight division history (8) (behind Max Holloway)
    - Third most finishes in UFC/WEC Featherweight division history (10) (behind Max Holloway & José Aldo)
  - Fourth most bouts in UFC Featherweight division history (25)
    - Most bouts in UFC/WEC Featherweight division history (33)
  - Third most wins in UFC Featherweight division history (16)
    - Most wins in UFC/WEC Featherweight division history (21)
  - Third most total fight time in UFC Featherweight division history (5:01:16)
  - Third most significant strikes landed in UFC Featherweight division history (1594)
    - Third most total strikes landed in UFC Featherweight division history (1868)
  - UFC.com Awards
    - 2012: Ranked #7 Fighter of the Year
    - 2016: Fight of the Year vs. Doo Ho Choi
- World Extreme Cagefighting
  - Fight of the Night (Four times) vs. Micah Miller, Hiroyuki Takaya, John Franchi, and Mackens Semerzier
  - Second most Fight of the Night bonuses in WEC history (4) (behind Donald Cerrone)
- Forbes
  - 2016 UFC Fight of the Year vs. Doo Ho Choi at UFC 206
- Bloody Elbow
  - 2016 Fight of the Year vs. Doo Ho Choi at UFC 206
- Cage Pages
  - 2016 UFC Fight of the Year vs. Doo Ho Choi at UFC 206
- MMA Junkie
  - 2014 June Fight of the Month vs. Jeremy Stephens at UFC Fight Night: Swanson vs. Stephens
  - 2016 #2 Ranked Fight of the Year vs. Doo Ho Choi at UFC 206
- ESPN
  - 2016 Fight of the Year vs. Doo Ho Choi at UFC 206
- World MMA Awards
  - 2016 Fight of the Year vs. Doo Ho Choi at UFC 206
- Sherdog
  - 2012 All-Violence First Team
- MMADNA.nl
  - 2016 Fight of the Year vs. Doo Ho Choi at UFC 206
- MMA Mania
  - 2016 Fight of the Year vs. Doo Ho Choi at UFC 206
- CBS Sports
  - 2016 UFC Fight of the Year vs. Doo Ho Choi at UFC 206
- Bleacher Report
  - 2012 #10 Ranked Fighter of the Year
- Combat Press
  - 2016 Fight of the Year vs. Doo Ho Choi at UFC 206

== Mixed martial arts record ==
Professional record breakdown
45 matches	31 wins	14 losses
By knockout	15	3
By submission	4	7
By decision	12	4

Res.	Record	Opponent	Method	Event	Date	Round	Time	Location	Notes
Win	31–14	Nate Landwehr	TKO (punches)	UFC 327	April 11, 2026	1	4:06	Miami, Florida, United States	
Win	30–14	Billy Quarantillo	KO (punch)	UFC on ESPN: Covington vs. Buckley	December 14, 2024	3	1:36	Tampa, Florida, United States	Fight of the Night.
Loss	29–14	Andre Fili	Decision (split)	UFC 303	June 29, 2024	3	5:00	Las Vegas, Nevada, United States	Fight of the Night.
Win	29–13	Hakeem Dawodu	Decision (unanimous)	UFC on ESPN: Luque vs. dos Anjos	August 12, 2023	3	5:00	Las Vegas, Nevada, United States	Return to Featherweight.
Loss	28–13	Jonathan Martinez	TKO (leg kick)	UFC Fight Night: Grasso vs. Araújo	October 15, 2022	2	4:19	Las Vegas, Nevada, United States	Bantamweight debut.
Win	28–12	Darren Elkins	TKO (spinning wheel kick and punches)	UFC Fight Night: Lewis vs. Daukaus	December 18, 2021	1	2:12	Las Vegas, Nevada, United States	Performance of the Night.
Loss	27–12	Giga Chikadze	TKO (body kick and punches)	UFC on ESPN: Reyes vs. Procházka	May 1, 2021	1	1:03	Las Vegas, Nevada, United States	
Win	27–11	Daniel Pineda	KO (punches)	UFC 256	December 12, 2020	2	1:52	Las Vegas, Nevada, United States	
Win	26–11	Kron Gracie	Decision (unanimous)	UFC Fight Night: Joanna vs. Waterson	October 12, 2019	3	5:00	Tampa, Florida, United States	Fight of the Night.
Loss	25–11	Shane Burgos	Decision (split)	UFC Fight Night: Iaquinta vs. Cowboy	May 4, 2019	3	5:00	Ottawa, Ontario, Canada	
Loss	25–10	Renato Moicano	Submission (rear-naked choke)	UFC 227	August 4, 2018	1	4:15	Los Angeles, California, United States	
Loss	25–9	Frankie Edgar	Decision (unanimous)	UFC Fight Night: Barboza vs. Lee	April 21, 2018	3	5:00	Atlantic City, New Jersey, United States	
Loss	25–8	Brian Ortega	Submission (guillotine choke)	UFC Fight Night: Swanson vs. Ortega	December 9, 2017	2	3:22	Fresno, California, United States	Fight of the Night.
Win	25–7	Artem Lobov	Decision (unanimous)	UFC Fight Night: Swanson vs. Lobov	April 22, 2017	5	5:00	Nashville, Tennessee, United States	Fight of the Night.
Win	24–7	Choi Doo-ho	Decision (unanimous)	UFC 206	December 10, 2016	3	5:00	Toronto, Ontario, Canada	Fight of the Night. Fight of the Year (2016).
Win	23–7	Tatsuya Kawajiri	Decision (unanimous)	UFC Fight Night: Rodríguez vs. Caceres	August 6, 2016	3	5:00	Salt Lake City, Utah, United States	
Win	22–7	Hacran Dias	Decision (unanimous)	UFC on Fox: Teixeira vs. Evans	April 16, 2016	3	5:00	Tampa, Florida, United States	
Loss	21–7	Max Holloway	Submission (guillotine choke)	UFC on Fox: Machida vs. Rockhold	April 18, 2015	3	3:58	Newark, New Jersey, United States	
Loss	21–6	Frankie Edgar	Submission (neck crank)	UFC Fight Night: Edgar vs. Swanson	November 22, 2014	5	4:56	Austin, Texas, United States	
Win	21–5	Jeremy Stephens	Decision (unanimous)	UFC Fight Night: Swanson vs. Stephens	June 28, 2014	5	5:00	San Antonio, Texas, United States	Fight of the Night.
Win	20–5	Dennis Siver	KO (punches)	UFC 162	July 6, 2013	3	2:24	Las Vegas, Nevada, United States	Fight of the Night.
Win	19–5	Dustin Poirier	Decision (unanimous)	UFC on Fuel TV: Barão vs. McDonald	February 16, 2013	3	5:00	London, England	
Win	18–5	Charles Oliveira	KO (punch)	UFC 152	September 22, 2012	1	2:40	Toronto, Ontario, Canada	Catchweight (146.4 lb) bout; Oliveira missed weight. Knockout of the Night.
Win	17–5	Ross Pearson	TKO (punches)	UFC on FX: Maynard vs. Guida	June 22, 2012	2	4:14	Atlantic City, New Jersey, United States	Knockout of the Night.
Win	16–5	George Roop	TKO (punches)	UFC on Fox: Evans vs. Davis	January 28, 2012	2	2:22	Chicago, Illinois, United States	
Loss	15–5	Ricardo Lamas	Submission (arm-triangle choke)	UFC on Fox: Velasquez vs. dos Santos	November 12, 2011	2	2:16	Anaheim, California, United States	
Win	15–4	Mackens Semerzier	Decision (split)	WEC 52	November 11, 2010	3	5:00	Las Vegas, Nevada, United States	Fight of the Night.
Loss	14–4	Chad Mendes	Decision (unanimous)	WEC 50	August 18, 2010	3	5:00	Las Vegas, Nevada, United States	
Win	14–3	John Franchi	Submission (guillotine choke)	WEC 44	November 18, 2009	3	4:50	Las Vegas, Nevada, United States	Fight of the Night.
Loss	13–3	José Aldo	TKO (flying knee and punches)	WEC 41	June 7, 2009	1	0:08	Sacramento, California, United States	
Win	13–2	Hiroyuki Takaya	Decision (unanimous)	WEC 37	December 3, 2008	3	5:00	Las Vegas, Nevada, United States	Fight of the Night.
Win	12–2	Donny Walker	Submission (rear-naked choke)	International Fighting & Boxing League: Fight Night 11	February 23, 2008	3	1:24	Niles, Ohio, United States	
Loss	11–2	Jens Pulver	Submission (anaconda choke)	WEC 31	December 12, 2007	1	0:35	Las Vegas, Nevada, United States	
Win	11–1	Micah Miller	Decision (unanimous)	WEC 28	June 3, 2007	3	5:00	Las Vegas, Nevada, United States	Fight of the Night.
Win	10–1	Tommy Lee	Submission (guillotine choke)	WEC 26	March 24, 2007	1	3:17	Las Vegas, Nevada, United States	
Win	9–1	Chuck Kim	KO (punch)	Beatdown in Bakersfield 1	November 17, 2006	1	4:51	Bakersfield, California, United States	
Win	8–1	Charlie Valencia	TKO (punches)	KOTC: BOOYAA	October 13, 2006	1	4:52	San Jacinto, California, United States	
Win	7–1	Richard Montano	Decision (unanimous)	KOTC: Rapid Fire	August 4, 2006	2	5:00	San Jacinto, California, United States	Featherweight debut.
Win	6–1	Shannon Gugerty	TKO (punches)	Total Combat 13	March 11, 2006	2	3:40	Del Mar, California, United States	
Win	5–1	Fernando Arreola	TKO (submission to punches)	KOTC: Final Conflict	December 2, 2005	1	3:21	San Jacinto, California, United States	
Win	4–1	Mike Corey	TKO (doctor stoppage)	KOTC: Flash Point	September 23, 2005	2	2:42	San Jacinto, California, United States	
Win	3–1	Armando Sanchez	TKO (submission to punches)	KOTC: Prime Time	August 5, 2005	1	1:59	San Jacinto, California, United States	
Win	2–1	Martin Bautista	Submission (rear-naked choke)	Total Combat 7	January 29, 2005	2	N/A	Tijuana, Mexico	
Win	1–1	Joe Morales	TKO (submission to punches)	Total Combat 6	October 24, 2004	1	2:28	Tijuana, Mexico	
Loss	0–1	Shannon Gugerty	Submission (rear-naked choke)	Total Combat 4	July 25, 2004	1	0:15	Tijuana, Mexico	Featherweight debut.

== See also ==
- List of male mixed martial artists
