= Shane Roller =

American mixed martial arts fighter (born 1979)

- Born: July 14, 1979 (age 47); Bixby, Oklahoma, U.S.
- Height: 5 ft 10 in (1.78 m)
- Weight: 155 lb (70 kg; 11.1 st)
- Reach: 72 in (180 cm)
- Stance: Orthodox
- Fighting out of: Las Vegas, Nevada, U.S.
- Team: Team Takedown
- Wrestling: NCAA Division I Wrestling
- Years active: 2007-2012

Mixed martial arts record
- Total: 18
- Wins: 11
- By knockout: 3
- By submission: 6
- By decision: 2
- Losses: 7
- By knockout: 3
- By submission: 3
- By decision: 1

Other information
- University: Oklahoma State University
- Mixed martial arts record from Sherdog
Medal record
Collegiate Wrestling
Representing the Oklahoma State Cowboys
NCAA Division I Championships
Bronze medal – third place	2001 Iowa City	157 lb
Bronze medal – third place	2003 Kansas City	157 lb

Shane Derrick Roller (born July 14, 1979) is a retired American mixed martial artist who is perhaps best known in his career for competing as a Lightweight for the UFC and WEC.

== Background ==
Roller was born and raised in Bixby, Oklahoma, along with his three brothers. Roller is known as one of the most decorated athletes in his state's history, a standout at Bixby High School while competing in wrestling, baseball, and football, lettering in each, and was the Tulsa World's 1998 Male Athlete of the Year. In baseball, he was a two-time letterman, playing shortstop, hitting in the lead-off spot, and was twice selected for the All-Metro Honorable Mention Team. In football, Roller played quarterback, running back, free safety, and was a three-time letterman. Roller was selected to play in the Jim Thorpe All-Star Game and was also selected as the 1997 Oklahoma Football Coaches Association All-Star Running Back.

In wrestling, Roller was his high school's first four-time state champion and was twice selected as the Most Outstanding Wrestler at the state tournament. He compiled a 141–3 record and was selected for the All-State team, being voted the Most Outstanding Wrestler at the All-State match. He was also an Asics First Team All-American and received the Junior Hodge Award which is given to the nation's most dominant high school wrestler. Roller also received the Dave Schultz award which is for academic and athletic excellence, as he was also his class' salutatorian and a member of the National Honor Society.

He received a scholarship to continue competing in wrestling for Oklahoma State University and was a three-time NCAA Division I All-American, three-time Academic All-American, and Big 12 Champion. Roller was also the captain of the 2003 NCAA Championship team, and earned a bachelor's degree in psychology. He later earned his master's degree from the school while working as an assistant coach, earning three NCAA championships.

== Mixed martial arts career ==
=== Early career ===
Roller made his professional mixed martial arts debut in 2007 and compiled a record of 3–1 before being signed by the WEC.

=== World Extreme Cagefighting ===
Roller made his WEC debut defeating Todd Moore at WEC 35 via submission (guillotine choke) at 3:00 of the first round. This was followed by another first round submission win over previously undefeated Mike Budnik at WEC 37.

Roller faced future UFC Lightweight Champion Benson Henderson on April 5, 2009, at WEC 40. He lost the fight via TKO due to punches in the first round.

Roller rebounded from his loss to Henderson defeating former Lightweight title challenger Marcus Hicks via unanimous decision on August 9, 2009, at WEC 42.

Roller defeated Danny Castillo on November 18, 2009, at WEC 44 via submission in the third round, earning Submission of the Night honors.

Roller faced Anthony Njokuani on April 24, 2010, at WEC 48. He won the fight via first-round rear-naked choke submission.

Roller faced Anthony Pettis on August 18, 2010, at WEC 50. Following a back and forth battle, the visibly exhausted Roller was submitted by Pettis via triangle choke with seconds left in the bout.

Roller faced former WEC Lightweight Champion Jamie Varner on December 16, 2010, at WEC 53. He won via submission in the first round.

=== Ultimate Fighting Championship ===
In October 2010, World Extreme Cagefighting merged with the Ultimate Fighting Championship. As part of the merger, all WEC fighters were transferred to the UFC.

Roller defeated Thiago Tavares via second round KO on March 3, 2011, at UFC Live: Sanchez vs. Kampmann, earning Knockout of the Night honors.

In his second UFC fight, Roller faced Melvin Guillard on July 2, 2011, at UFC 132. He lost the fight via KO in the first round.

Roller faced T. J. Grant on October 1, 2011, at UFC on Versus 6. Roller lost via controversial armbar submission in round 3.

Roller faced Michael Johnson on January 28, 2012, at UFC on Fox 2, replacing an injured Cody McKenzie. Roller lost via unanimous decision (29-28, 29-28, 29-28).

Roller defeated John Alessio on July 7, 2012, at UFC 148 via unanimous decision.

Roller was expected to face Jacob Volkmann on September 1, 2012, at UFC 151. However, after UFC 151 was cancelled, Roller/Volkmann was rescheduled and instead took place on October 5, 2012, at UFC on FX 5. Roller was taken down early in the fight and eventually submitted via rear naked choke. Shortly after the event Shane announced his retirement from mixed martial arts competition.

== Personal life ==
Shane is married to Jennifer Roller and the couple have four children. Roller's three brothers, Keith, Mike, and Jimmy all played sports at the collegiate level. Keith played football, while Mike and Jimmy wrestled. Shane began Wrestling after he was bullied in the 2nd grade for letting flatulence slip.

== Mixed martial arts record ==
Professional record breakdown
18 matches	11 wins	7 losses
By knockout	3	3
By submission	6	3
By decision	2	1

Res.	Record	Opponent	Method	Event	Date	Round	Time	Location	Notes
Loss	11–7	Jacob Volkmann	Submission (rear-naked choke)	UFC on FX: Browne vs. Bigfoot	October 5, 2012	1	2:38	Minneapolis, Minnesota, United States	
Win	11–6	John Alessio	Decision (unanimous)	UFC 148	July 7, 2012	3	5:00	Las Vegas, Nevada, United States	
Loss	10–6	Michael Johnson	Decision (unanimous)	UFC on Fox: Evans vs. Davis	January 28, 2012	3	5:00	Chicago, Illinois, United States	
Loss	10–5	T. J. Grant	Submission (armbar)	UFC Live: Cruz vs. Johnson	October 1, 2011	3	2:12	Washington, D.C. United States	
Loss	10–4	Melvin Guillard	KO (punches)	UFC 132	July 2, 2011	1	2:12	Las Vegas, Nevada, United States	
Win	10–3	Thiago Tavares	KO (punches)	UFC Live: Sanchez vs. Kampmann	March 3, 2011	2	1:28	Louisville, Kentucky, United States	Knockout of the Night.
Win	9–3	Jamie Varner	Submission (rear-naked choke)	WEC 53	December 16, 2010	1	3:55	Glendale, Arizona, United States	Submission of the Night.
Loss	8–3	Anthony Pettis	Submission (triangle choke)	WEC 50	August 18, 2010	3	4:51	Las Vegas, Nevada, United States	
Win	8–2	Anthony Njokuani	Submission (rear-naked choke)	WEC 48	April 24, 2010	1	3:07	Sacramento, California, United States	
Win	7–2	Danny Castillo	Submission (rear-naked choke)	WEC 44	November 18, 2009	3	3:32	Las Vegas, Nevada, United States	Submission of the Night.
Win	6–2	Marcus Hicks	Decision (unanimous)	WEC 42	August 9, 2009	3	5:00	Las Vegas, Nevada, United States	
Loss	5–2	Benson Henderson	TKO (punches)	WEC 40	April 5, 2009	1	1:41	Chicago, Illinois, United States	
Win	5–1	Mike Budnik	Submission (guillotine choke)	WEC 37	December 3, 2008	1	1:01	Las Vegas, Nevada, United States	
Win	4–1	Todd Moore	Submission (guillotine choke)	WEC 35	August 3, 2008	1	3:00	Las Vegas, Nevada, United States	
Win	3–1	Yoshihiro Kitaoka	TKO (punches)	Xtreme Fighting League	March 15, 2008	1	1:50	Tulsa, Oklahoma, United States	
Win	2–1	Erick Fernandez	Submission (guillotine choke)	CCCF: Contenders	January 19, 2008	1	2:23	Oklahoma City, Oklahoma, United States	
Win	1–1	Ryan Winthers	TKO (punches)	HRP: Fight Night	November 16, 2007	1	0:16	Tulsa, Oklahoma, United States	
Loss	0–1	Jake Pruitt	TKO (punches)	Masters of the Cage 16	September 28, 2007	3	2:15	Oklahoma City, Oklahoma, United States	
