= Mike Budnik =

American mixed martial arts fighter

- Born: August 8, 1974 (age 52); Brooklyn, New York, United States
- Other names: Wildfire
- Nationality: American
- Height: 5 ft 9 in (1.75 m)
- Weight: 155 lb (70 kg; 11.1 st)
- Division: Lightweight
- Fighting out of: Chicago, Illinois, United States
- Team: Spartan Academy
- Years active: 2007–present

Mixed martial arts record
- Total: 18
- Wins: 14
- By knockout: 3
- By submission: 8
- By decision: 3
- Losses: 4
- By submission: 2
- By decision: 2
- Draws: 0

Other information
- Mixed martial arts record from Sherdog

Michael Allan Budnik, Jr. (born August 8, 1974) is an American mixed martial artist and former professional in-line skater. He competed in the first ten X-Games.

Budnik has been a resident of Sparta Township, New Jersey.

== MMA career ==
Budnik built up an undefeated 6–0 record fighting close to home before being invited to compete in WEC. He made his debut for the organization on August 3, 2008, at WEC 35 against Greg McIntyre. He won the bout by pulling off a submission due to triangle choke in the third round.

In his next bout he would face collegiate wrestling champion and fellow Oklahoman Shane Roller. Budnik lost via guillotine choke in the first round.

Budnik competed in a notable fight against UFC veteran Rich Clementi, which he lost due to rear naked choke in the 5th round. Budnik has made it on The Ultimate Fighter 12. Budnik was eliminated on the first episode of The Ultimate Fighter by Nam Phan by 1st-round TKO due to a liver shot and punches.

Budnik fought again on July 17, 2010, against UFC Vet Anthony Macias and won the fight in the second round by submission due to an arm triangle choke to improve his record to 9–4. After recent wins over Scrap Pak fighter and Bellator and Strikeforce Vet Johnny Carson, Miletich fighter Brandon Adamson and winning the Combat MMA 155 lb. title over rising Oklahoma star Jesse Chaffin, Budnik's winning streak has reached 6 in a row.

== Mixed martial arts record ==
As of February 2018, Sherdog lists Budnik's professional record as 14 wins and 4 losses.

Professional record breakdown
18 matches	14 wins	4 losses
By knockout	3	0
By submission	8	2
By decision	3	2

Res.	Record	Opponent	Method	Event	Date	Round	Time	Location	Notes
Win	14–4	Jay Ellis	Submission (rear-naked choke)	XFO 62 - Xtreme Fighting Organization 62	17 February 2018	1	1:39	Woodstock, Illinois, United States	
Win	13–4	Jesse Chaffin	TKO (punches)	CMMA - Combat MMA	17 August 2013	2	2:23	Tulsa, Oklahoma, United States	
Win	12–4	Brandon Adamson	Submission (guillotine choke)	XFO 44 - Xtreme Fighting Organization 44	16 June 2012	1	4:30	Hoffman Estates, Illinois, United States	
Win	11–4	Jonny Carson	Submission (rear-naked choke)	XFL - XFN 2: Harris vs. Head	25 February 2011	3	1:15	Tulsa, Oklahoma, United States	
Win	10–4	Mario Stapel	Decision (split)	C3 Fights - Knockout-Rockout Weekend 5	4 September 2010	3	5:00	Concho, Oklahoma, United States	
Win	9–4	Anthony Macias	Submission (choke)	C3 Fights - Knockout-Rockout Weekend 4	17 July 2010	2	1:30	Clinton, Oklahoma, United States	
Loss	8–4	Rich Clementi	Submission (rear-naked choke)	5150 Combat League / Xtreme Fighting League - New Year's Revolution	16 January 2010	5	2:10	Tulsa, Oklahoma, United States	
Win	8–3	Ryan Bixler	Decision (split)	C3 Fights - Slammin Jammin Weekend 1	18 September 2009	3	3:00	Newkirk, Oklahoma, United States	
Loss	7–3	Rafael Dias	Decision (unanimous)	WEC 40 - Torres vs. Mizugaki	5 April 2009	3	5:00	Chicago, Illinois, United States	
Loss	7–2	John Franchi	Decision (split)	WEC 39 - Brown vs. Garcia	1 March 2009	3	5:00	Corpus Christi, Texas, United States	
Loss	7–1	Shane Roller	Submission (guillotine choke)	WEC 37 - Torres vs. Tapia	3 December 2008	1	1:01	Las Vegas, Nevada, United States	
Win	7–0	Greg McIntyre	Submission (triangle choke)	WEC 35 - World Extreme Cagefighting 35	3 August 2008	3	3:21	Las Vegas, Nevada, United States	
Win	6–0	Dustin Phillips	Submission (guillotine choke)	XFL - Xtreme Fighting League	15 March 2008	1	2:06	Tulsa, Oklahoma, United States	
Win	5–0	Tim Estes	Submission (triangle choke)	XFL - Xtreme Fighting League	25 January 2008	2	0:51	Miami, Oklahoma, United States	
Win	4–0	Kenny Giddens	KO (punch)	XFL - Xtreme Fight Night	10 November 2007	1	1:07	Catoosa, Oklahoma, United States	
Win	3–0	Ryan Robinson	TKO	ICS - Cage Rage	13 October 2007	1	2:19	Tulsa, Oklahoma, United States	
Win	2–0	Johnny Flores	Decision (split)	KOTC - Jawbreaker	29 September 2007	2		Oklahoma, United States	
Win	1–0	Josh Pulsifer	Technical Submission (triangle choke)	XFL - Battle at the Buffalo Run	8 September 2007	2	0:44	Miami, Oklahoma, United States	
