= Rolando Perez =

American mixed martial arts fighter

- Born: 1984 or 1985 (age 41–42); San Diego, California, United States
- Nationality: American
- Height: 5 ft 8 in (173 cm)
- Weight: 135.5 lb (61.5 kg)
- Division: Bantamweight (135 lb); Featherweight (145 lb)
- Reach: 72 in (183 cm)
- Fighting out of: San Diego, California, United States
- Team: Alliance MMA
- Rank: Purple belt in Brazilian Jiu-Jitsu
- Years active: 2005–2011, 2014–present

Professional boxing record
- Total: 2
- Wins: 1
- By knockout: 1
- Losses: 1
- By knockout: 1

Mixed martial arts record
- Total: 14
- Wins: 7
- By knockout: 1
- By submission: 3
- By decision: 3
- Losses: 5
- By knockout: 1
- By submission: 1
- By decision: 3
- Draws: 2

Other information
- Boxing record from BoxRec
- Mixed martial arts record from Sherdog

Rolando Perez is an American mixed martial artist who currently competes in Bellator's bantamweight division. He has also formerly competed for World Extreme Cagefighting and Strikeforce.

== Mixed martial arts career ==
=== Early career ===
Perez started his professional career in 2005. He fought mainly for California–based promotion Total Combat.

In 2009, after amassing a record of four victories, one loss and one draw, Perez signed with World Extreme Cagefighting.

=== World Extreme Cagefighting ===
Perez made his promotional debut on January 25, 2009, at WEC 38 against future UFC's featherweight champion José Aldo. Perez was knocked out at 4:15 in the first round.

Perez next faced Seth Dikun on June 7, 2009, at WEC 41. He lost via submission due to a triangle choke in the first round.

=== Strikeforce ===
Perez faced Edgar Cardenas on April 9, 2011, at Strikeforce: Diaz vs. Daley. He won via unanimous decision (30–27, 30–27, 30–27).

=== Bellator MMA ===
Perez made his promotional debut against Mark Vorgeas on November 15, 2014, at Bellator 131. The bout ended in a split draw (29–27 Perez, 30–26 Vorgeas, 28–28).

Perez faced Shawn Bunch at Bellator 137 on May 15, 2015. He lost the fight by unanimous decision.

== Mixed martial arts record ==
Professional record breakdown
14 matches	7 wins	5 losses
By knockout	1	1
By submission	3	1
By decision	3	3
Draws	2	

Res.	Record	Opponent	Method	Event	Date	Round	Time	Location	Notes
Loss	7–5–2	Shawn Bunch	Decision (unanimous)	Bellator 137	May 15, 2015	3	5:00	Temecula, California, United States	
Draw	7–4–2	Mark Vorgeas	Draw (split)	Bellator 131	November 15, 2014	3	5:00	San Diego, California, United States	
Win	7–4–1	Tony Reyes	Decision (unanimous)	Pacific Xtreme Combat 24	June 11, 2011	3	5:00	Manila, Philippines	
Win	6–4–1	Edgar Cardenas	Decision (unanimous)	Strikeforce: Diaz vs. Daley	April 9, 2011	3	5:00	San Diego, California, United States	140 lb catchweight bout.
Win	5–4–1	Todd Willingham	Decision (split)	Gladiator Challenge: Bad Behavior	June 27, 2010	3	3:00	San Jacinto, California, United States	
Loss	4–4–1	Adam Lorenz	Decision (unanimous)	AMMA 1: First Blood	October 24, 2009	3	5:00	Edmonton, Alberta, Canada	
Loss	4–3–1	Seth Dikun	Submission (flying triangle choke)	WEC 41: Brown vs. Faber 2	June 7, 2009	1	2:30	Sacramento, California, United States	Moves down to bantamweight.
Loss	4–2–1	José Aldo	KO (knee and punches)	WEC 38: Varner vs. Cerrone	January 25, 2009	1	4:15	San Diego, California, United States	
Win	4–1–1	Nick Alvarado	TKO (corner stoppage)	Total Combat 32	October 2, 2008	1	5:00	El Cajon, California, United States	
Draw	3–1–1	Joshric Fenwick	Draw	Total Combat 28	April 26, 2008	3	5:00	San Diego, California, United States	
Win	3–1	Kenneth Mendoza	Submission (verbal)	Total Combat 27	March 22, 2008	1	N/A	Yuma, Arizona, United States	
Win	2–1	Jamie Fisher	Submission (rear-naked choke)	Total Combat 17: Proving Ground	October 21, 2006	1	N/A	Yuma, Arizona, United States	
Loss	1–1	Angelo Catsouras	Decision (unanimous)	Total Combat 13: Anarchy	March 11, 2006	3	3:00	Del Mar, California, United States	
Win	1–0	Raymond Gomez	Submission (rear-naked choke)	Total Combat 9	July 30, 2005	1	N/A	Tijuana, Baja California, Mexico	

== Professional boxing record ==
1 Win (1 knockout), 1 Loss (1 knockout)
Res.	Record	Opponent	Type	Rd., Time	Date	Location	Notes
Loss	1–1	(Mexico) Julio Nario	TKO	2 (4), 2:13	2013-03-29	Auditorio Municipal, Tijuana, Baja California, Mexico	
Win	1–0	(Mexico) Federico Martinez	TKO	2 (4)	2010-12-17	Four Points Sheraton Hotel, San Diego, California, United States	
