= Manny Gamburyan =

Armenian mixed martial arts fighter

- Born: May 8, 1981 (age 45); Leninakan, Armenian SSR, Soviet Union
- Native name: Մանվել Գամբուրյան
- Other names: The Pitbull, The Anvil
- Nationality: Armenian; American
- Height: 5 ft 5 in (165 cm)
- Weight: 135 lb (61 kg; 9 st 9 lb)
- Division: Welterweight; Lightweight; Featherweight; Bantamweight
- Reach: 68 in (170 cm)
- Fighting out of: North Hollywood, California, U.S.
- Team: Team Hayastan; Glendale Fighting Club; S.K. Golden Boys
- Rank: Second dan black belt in Judo; Second dan black belt in Kyokushin Karate; Purple belt in Brazilian Jiu-Jitsu
- Years active: 1999–2017

Mixed martial arts record
- Total: 26
- Wins: 15
- By knockout: 2
- By submission: 7
- By decision: 6
- Losses: 10
- By knockout: 5
- By submission: 0
- By decision: 5
- No contests: 1

Other information
- Notable relatives: Karo Parisyan, cousin
- Mixed martial arts record from Sherdog

Manny Gamburyan (Armenian: Մանվել Գամբուրյան; born May 8, 1981) is an Armenian retired mixed martial artist who competed in the UFC's lightweight, featherweight, and bantamweight divisions. A professional competitor since 1999, he was a cast member of Spike TV's The Ultimate Fighter 5, and also competed in World Extreme Cagefighting (WEC) and King of the Cage (KOTC).

== Background ==
In May 1991, Gamburyan's family relocated from Armenia to the United States. Shortly after his arrival, he began training in judo at Gokor Chivichyan and Gene LeBell's Hayastan MMA Academy, quickly becoming one of the top judokan in the country, winning junior nationals less than two years later. He went on to win junior nationals eight times, the junior Olympics once, and was a member of the 2000 Junior World Team. Later, Gamburyan also began training in Kyokushin Karate aged 15.

== Mixed martial arts career ==
=== Early career ===
Gamburyan began his career in mixed martial arts in 1999 at the age of 17. He won his first four fights, then lost a decision to future UFC Lightweight Champion Sean Sherk in 2001. Gamburyan's cousin Karo Parisyan nicknamed him "The Pitbull" for the tenacity he displayed in the fight.

=== The Ultimate Fighter ===
In 2007, Gamburyan appeared on the reality show The Ultimate Fighter 5, fighting on Jens Pulver's team. His nickname was changed to "Anvil" for his UFC career because "Pitbull" was already taken by other UFC fighters such as Andrei Arlovski and Thiago Alves.

Gamburyan defeated Noah Thomas by kimura lock in the preliminary round. In his next matchup, Gamburyan defeated Matt Wiman to advance to the semifinal round.

In the semifinal round, Gamburyan beat Joe Lauzon in a unanimous decision and advanced to the finale with Nate Diaz. He was considered an underdog in each of his fights, in part due to his short stature. After the Lauzon fight, UFC president Dana White personally apologized to Gamburyan for doubting him. In the finale, Gamburyan controlled Diaz for the majority of the fight, but was forced to tap out in the second round after dislocating his right shoulder on an unsuccessful takedown attempt. Although this technically counts as a submission due to injury, Gamburyan has never been submitted by an opponent in his MMA career.

=== Ultimate Fighting Championship ===
Despite losing the show, Gamburyan secured a UFC contract with his performance. He won his next two UFC fights, defeating Nate Mohr by ankle lock at UFC 79 and Jeff Cox by guillotine choke at UFC Fight Night 13. Gamburyan raised some controversy in the Cox fight by delivering a spinning leg kick after feigning the mutual tap of gloves that is often seen at the beginning of the match. The crowd in attendance reacted with heavy booing.

He returned to action at UFC 87 and was knocked out in 12 seconds by Rob Emerson.

At UFC 94, Gamburyan lost to Thiago Tavares in a back and forth fight via unanimous decision (29–28, 29–28, 29–28).

=== World Extreme Cagefighting ===
After his loss to Tavares, Gamburyan decided to drop down to the featherweight division and fight in the Zuffa-owned WEC.

Gamburyan's first fight at featherweight was a decision win over John Franchi at WEC 41.

Gamburyan defeated Leonard Garcia on November 18, 2009, at WEC 44 via unanimous decision.

Gamburyan fought former WEC Featherweight Champion Mike Brown at WEC 48. He won by knockout in the first round as well as getting the Knockout of the Night bonus of $65,000.

Gamburyan lost via second-round KO to José Aldo in a bout for the WEC Featherweight Championship on September 30, 2010, at WEC 51.

=== UFC return ===
On October 28, 2010, World Extreme Cagefighting merged with the Ultimate Fighting Championship. As part of the merger, all WEC fighters were transferred to the UFC.

Gamburyan was expected to face Raphael Assunção on March 19, 2011, at UFC 128, but was forced out of the bout with a back injury and replaced by Erik Koch.

Gamburyan next faced Tyson Griffin on June 26, 2011, at UFC on Versus 4. He lost the fight via majority decision.

Gamburyan was expected to face Diego Nunes on September 24, 2011, at UFC 135, but was forced to withdraw from the bout after suffering a shoulder injury. The bout ultimately took place at UFC 141 and Gamburyan lost via unanimous decision.

Gamburyan defeated Michihiro Omigawa via unanimous decision on August 4, 2012, at UFC on FOX 4.

Gamburyan was expected to face Chad Mendes on February 23, 2013, at UFC 157. However, Gamburyan was forced out of the bout with a thumb injury. Mendes was then pulled from the card as a suitable replacement could not be found on short notice.

Gamburyan was expected to face Hacran Dias on May 18, 2013, at UFC on FX 8. However, Gamburyan was forced to pull out of the bout citing another injury and was replaced by Nik Lentz.

Gamburyan faced Cole Miller on August 17, 2013, at UFC Fight Night 26. Gamburyan won the fight via unanimous decision.

Gamburyan faced Dennis Siver on December 28, 2013, at UFC 168. He lost the fight via unanimous decision. Subsequently, Siver failed a post fight drug screening, testing positive for banned substances. As a result, the decision was changed to a "No Contest".

Gamburyan faced Nik Lentz on May 10, 2014, at UFC Fight Night 40. He lost the fight via unanimous decision.

Gamburyan faced Cody Gibson in a bantamweight bout on September 27, 2014, at UFC 178. He won the fight via submission in the second round.

Gamburyan was expected to face Aljamain Sterling on April 18, 2015, at UFC on Fox 15. However, Gamburyan pulled out of the bout citing injury and was replaced by Takeya Mizugaki.

Gamburyan faced Scott Jorgensen on July 15, 2015, at UFC Fight Night 71. He won the fight via unanimous decision.

Gamburyan next faced John Dodson on April 16, 2016, at UFC on Fox 19. Gamburyan lost the fight via TKO in the first round.

Gamburyan was expected to face Alejandro Pérez on September 17, 2016, at UFC Fight Night 94. However, Gamburyan pulled out of the fight in mid-August for undisclosed personal reasons and was replaced by Albert Morales.

Gamburyan lost to Johnny Eduardo on November 19, 2016, at UFC Fight Night 100 by 2nd-round TKO. Gamburyan then announced his retirement.

Less than two years into his retirement, Gamburyan appeared on Ariel and the Bad Guy Show and revealed he is returning from retirement and planning to enter competition in mid-2019.

== Personal life ==
Gamburyan is one of Ronda Rousey's main coaches. They met through practicing judo at North Hollywood, California Hayastan MMA Academy.

== Championships and accomplishments ==
- Ultimate Fighting Championship
  - The Ultimate Fighter 5 Lightweight Runner-Up
- World Extreme Cagefighting
  - Knockout of the Night (One time) vs. Mike Brown

== Mixed martial arts record ==
Professional record breakdown
26 matches	15 wins	10 losses
By knockout	2	5
By submission	7	0
By decision	6	5
No contests	1	

Res.	Record	Opponent	Method	Event	Date	Round	Time	Location	Notes
Loss	15–10 (1)	Johnny Eduardo	TKO (punches)	UFC Fight Night: Bader vs. Nogueira 2	November 19, 2016	2	0:46	São Paulo, Brazil	
Loss	15–9 (1)	John Dodson	TKO (punches)	UFC on Fox: Teixeira vs. Evans	April 16, 2016	1	0:37	Tampa, Florida, United States	
Win	15–8 (1)	Scott Jorgensen	Decision (unanimous)	UFC Fight Night: Mir vs. Duffee	July 15, 2015	3	5:00	San Diego, California, United States	
Win	14–8 (1)	Cody Gibson	Submission (guillotine choke)	UFC 178	September 27, 2014	2	4:56	Las Vegas, Nevada, United States	Bantamweight debut.
Loss	13–8 (1)	Nik Lentz	Decision (unanimous)	UFC Fight Night: Brown vs. Silva	May 10, 2014	3	5:00	Cincinnati, Ohio, United States	
NC	13–7 (1)	Dennis Siver	NC (overturned)	UFC 168	December 28, 2013	3	5:00	Las Vegas, Nevada, United States	Originally a unanimous decision win for Siver; overturned after he tested positive for hCG.
Win	13–7	Cole Miller	Decision (unanimous)	UFC Fight Night: Shogun vs. Sonnen	August 17, 2013	3	5:00	Boston, Massachusetts, United States	
Win	12–7	Michihiro Omigawa	Decision (unanimous)	UFC on Fox: Shogun vs. Vera	August 4, 2012	3	5:00	Los Angeles, California, United States	
Loss	11–7	Diego Nunes	Decision (unanimous)	UFC 141	December 30, 2011	3	5:00	Las Vegas, Nevada, United States	
Loss	11–6	Tyson Griffin	Decision (majority)	UFC Live: Kongo vs. Barry	June 26, 2011	3	5:00	Pittsburgh, Pennsylvania, United States	
Loss	11–5	José Aldo	KO (punches)	WEC 51	September 30, 2010	2	1:32	Broomfield, Colorado, United States	For the WEC Featherweight Championship.
Win	11–4	Mike Brown	KO (punches)	WEC 48	April 24, 2010	1	2:22	Sacramento, California, United States	Knockout of the Night.
Win	10–4	Leonard Garcia	Decision (unanimous)	WEC 44	November 18, 2009	3	5:00	Las Vegas, Nevada, United States	
Win	9–4	John Franchi	Decision (unanimous)	WEC 41	June 7, 2009	3	5:00	Sacramento, California, United States	Featherweight debut.
Loss	8–4	Thiago Tavares	Decision (unanimous)	UFC 94	January 31, 2009	3	5:00	Las Vegas, Nevada, United States	
Loss	8–3	Rob Emerson	KO (punches)	UFC 87	August 9, 2008	1	0:12	Minneapolis, Minnesota, United States	
Win	8–2	Jeff Cox	Submission (guillotine choke)	UFC Fight Night: Florian vs. Lauzon	March 2, 2008	1	1:41	Broomfield, Colorado, United States	
Win	7–2	Nate Mohr	Submission (achilles lock)	UFC 79	December 29, 2007	1	1:31	Las Vegas, Nevada, United States	
Loss	6–2	Nate Diaz	TKO (shoulder injury)	The Ultimate Fighter 5 Finale	June 23, 2007	2	0:20	Las Vegas, Nevada, United States	The Ultimate Fighter 5 Lightweight Tournament final.
Win	6–1	Sammy Morgan	Decision (unanimous)	RSF: Shooto Challenge 2	January 2, 2004	3	5:00	Belleville, Illinois, United States	
Win	5–1	Jorge Santiago	KO (punch)	KOTC 27: Aftermath	August 10, 2003	1	0:21	San Jacinto, California, United States	
Loss	4–1	Sean Sherk	Decision (unanimous)	Reality Submission Fighting 3	March 30, 2001	1	18:00	Belleville, Illinois, United States	
Win	4–0	Pat Benson	Submission (guillotine choke)	Reality Submission Fighting 2	January 2, 2001	1	2:01	Belleville, Illinois, United States	
Win	3–0	Darren Bryant	Submission (heel hook)	Kage Kombat 14	March 5, 1999	1	0:35	Los Angeles, California, United States	
Win	2–0	Timothy Morris	Technical Submission (choke)	Kage Kombat 12	February 1, 1999	1	0:16	Los Angeles, California, United States	
Win	1–0	Danny Henderson	Submission (armbar)	Kage Kombat 12	February 1, 1999	1	0:17	Los Angeles, California, United States	

== Mixed martial arts exhibition record ==
Professional record breakdown
3 matches	3 wins	0 losses
By knockout	0	0
By submission	1	0
By decision	2	0

Res.	Record	Opponent	Method	Event	Date	Round	Time	Location	Notes
Win	3–0	Joe Lauzon	Decision (unanimous)	The Ultimate Fighter 5	June 14, 2007 (air date)	3	5:00	Las Vegas, Nevada, United States	Semi-finals.
Win	2–0	Matt Wiman	Decision (unanimous)	The Ultimate Fighter 5	June 7, 2007 (air date)	2	5:00	Las Vegas, Nevada, United States	Quarter-finals.
Win	1–0	Noah Thomas	Submission (kimura)	The Ultimate Fighter 5	April 12, 2007 (air date)	1	2:10	Las Vegas, Nevada, United States	Elimination round.

== See also ==
- List of male mixed martial artists
