= UFC 74 =

UFC mixed martial arts event in 2007

UFC 74: Respect
- The poster for UFC 74: Respect
- Promotion: Ultimate Fighting Championship
- Date: August 25, 2007
- Venue: Mandalay Bay Events Center
- City: Las Vegas, Nevada
- Attendance: 11,118 (9,622 paid)
- Total gate: $3,307,000
- Buyrate: 520,000

Event chronology
UFC 73: Stacked	UFC 74: Respect	UFC 75: Champion vs. Champion

UFC 74: Respect was a mixed martial arts pay-per-view event held by the Ultimate Fighting Championship on August 25, 2007, at the Mandalay Bay Events Center in Las Vegas, Nevada.

== Background ==
The main event was a UFC Heavyweight Championship bout which featured champion Randy Couture defending his title against Gabriel Gonzaga, who knocked out Mirko Filipović at UFC 70 to become the number one contender.

Former UFC and TKO Major League MMA welterweight champion Georges St-Pierre, in his first fight since losing his title to Matt Serra at UFC 69, was matched up against The Ultimate Fighter's Josh Koscheck.

The card also featured former heavyweight champion Frank Mir against K-1 veteran Antoni Hardonk; The Ultimate Fighter 3's winner Kendall Grove; the UFC debut of PRIDE veteran Marcus Aurélio; The Ultimate Fighter 2 welterweight winner Joe Stevenson; and former light heavyweight challenger Renato Sobral.

Despite winning his bout, Sobral was fined $25,000 by the Nevada State Athletic Commission because he did not immediately follow referee's directions for releasing his chokehold after David Heath tapped. Due to the controversial manner in which the bout was stopped, Sobral was subsequently released from his UFC contract. Future UFC Heavyweight champion Brock Lesnar has said in an interview with ESPN that he wanted to fight in the UFC but Dana White wouldn't take his calls. He then said that he went to this event and after the show was over he jumped the barricade, avoided security, and introduced himself to White.

== Results ==
Main card (PPV)
Weight class				Method	Round	Time	Notes
Heavyweight	Randy Couture (c)	def.	Gabriel Gonzaga	TKO (punches)	3	1:37	(Note: For the UFC Heavyweight Championship. Gonzaga was deducted 1 point in round 2 for grabbing the cage.)
Welterweight	Georges St-Pierre	def.	Josh Koscheck	Decision (unanimous) (30–27, 29–28, 29–28)	3	5:00
Lightweight	Roger Huerta	def.	Alberto Crane	TKO (punches)	3	1:50
Lightweight	Joe Stevenson	def.	Kurt Pellegrino	Decision (unanimous) (30–27, 30–27, 29–28)	3	5:00
Middleweight	Patrick Côté	def.	Kendall Grove	KO (punches)	1	4:45
Preliminary card
Light Heavyweight	Renato Sobral	def.	David Heath	Technical submission (anaconda choke)	2	3:30
Heavyweight	Frank Mir	def.	Antoni Hardonk	Submission (kimura)	1	1:17
Middleweight	Thales Leites	def.	Ryan Jensen	Submission (armbar)	1	3:47
Lightweight	Clay Guida	def.	Marcus Aurélio	Decision (split) (30–27, 28–29, 30–27)	3	5:00

== Bonus awards ==
The following fighters received $40,000 bonuses.

- Fight of the Night: Randy Couture vs. Gabriel Gonzaga
- Knockout of the Night: Patrick Côté
- Submission of the Night: Thales Leites

== Reported payout ==
- Randy Couture: $250,000
- Gabriel Gonzaga: $45,000
- Georges St-Pierre: $140,000 (includes $70,000 win bonus)
- Josh Koscheck: $10,000
- Roger Huerta: $34,000 (includes $17,000 win bonus)
- Alberto Crane: $4,000
- Joe Stevenson: $32,000 (includes $16,000 win bonus)
- Kurt Pellegrino: $8,000
- Patrick Coté: $24,000 (includes $12,000 win bonus)
- Kendall Grove: $12,000
- Renato Sobral: $25,000 ($25,000 win bonus withheld by NSAC)
- David Heath: $6,000
- Frank Mir: $66,000 (includes $30,000 win bonus)
- Antoni Hardonk: $8,000
- Thales Leites: $18,000 (includes $9,000 win bonus)
- Ryan Jensen: $4,000
- Clay Guida: $14,000 (includes $7,000 win bonus)
- Marcus Aurélio: $30,000

== See also ==
- Ultimate Fighting Championship
- List of UFC champions
- List of UFC events
- 2007 in UFC
