= UFC 75 =

UFC mixed martial arts event in 2007

UFC 75: Champion vs. Champion
- The poster for UFC 75: Champion vs. Champion
- Promotion: Ultimate Fighting Championship
- Date: September 8, 2007
- Venue: The O_{2} Arena
- City: London, United Kingdom
- Attendance: 16,235
- Total gate: $2.7 million

Event chronology
UFC 74: Respect	UFC 75: Champion vs. Champion	UFC Fight Night: Thomas vs. Florian

UFC 75: Champion vs. Champion was a mixed martial arts event held by the Ultimate Fighting Championship. The event was held September 8, 2007, at The O_{2} in London, United Kingdom.

== Background ==
The event was the fourth event held by the UFC in United Kingdom, following UFC 38 in London, UFC 70 in Manchester, and UFC 72 in Belfast.

The event aired on Setanta Sports 1 in the United Kingdom, TV4 Sport in Sweden, PPV1 in Ireland, and presented via tape delay on Spike TV for North American audiences.

The main event was a title unification match between UFC Light Heavyweight Champion Quinton Jackson and PRIDE Fighting Championships' 83 kg and 93 kg champion, Dan Henderson. There were some discussion on whether the title fight would be for both the UFC and PRIDE titles or just the UFC title. UFC president Dana White had remarked on July 2, 2007,

"No. What we’re doing with that thing is we’re respecting both (the UFC and PRIDE) titles. The UFC title is the UFC champion and we’re respecting Dan as the PRIDE champion. Quinton will walk out with his belt if Dan wins and vice versa."

He had since changed that stance, and on July 10, 2007, stated:

"It will absolutely be a unification bout. We have to respect Henderson's titles. He knocked out Wanderlei Silva and had the 185-pound championship. When he fights "Rampage", they both have belts. Why should Dan Henderson get the UFC title if "Rampage" can't get the PRIDE titles? It makes one of them the undisputed guy."

By October 2007, Pride Worldwide LLC, sister company to UFC promoters Zuffa, would abandon plans to continue PRIDE as an active promotion.

British Light Heavyweight Michael Bisping, who won The Ultimate Fighter 3 contest in 2006, fought Team Punishment's Matt Hamill, who rivaled Bisping during the taping of The Ultimate Fighter 3. Also featured was a heavyweight bout between PRIDE and K-1 veteran Mirko Cro Cop and French Muay Thai kickboxer Cheick Kongo.

Anthony Johnson was scheduled to face Jess Liaudin, but was forced to pull out due to a shoulder injury.

At the time, UFC 75 had achieved the highest recorded ratings for any mixed martial arts broadcast in North America, drawing a total of 4.7 million viewers (5.93 million at its peak) and beating out the previous record held by the UFC's Ortiz vs. Shamrock 3: The Final Chapter. The mark would later be beaten by CBS's EliteXC: Primetime.

== Results ==
Main card (Spike TV)
Weight class				Method	Round	Time	Notes
Light Heavyweight	Quinton Jackson (c)	def.	Dan Henderson	Decision (unanimous) (48–47, 49–46, 49–46)	5	5:00	(Note: Unification bout. Jackson was the UFC Light Heavyweight Champion and Henderson was the Pride Middleweight Champion.)
Light Heavyweight	Michael Bisping	def.	Matt Hamill	Decision (split) (29–28, 27–30, 29–28)	3	5:00
Heavyweight	Cheick Kongo	def.	Mirko Cro Cop	Decision (unanimous) (29–28, 29–28, 29–28)	3	5:00
Welterweight	Marcus Davis	def.	Paul Taylor	Submission (armbar)	1	4:14
Light Heavyweight	Houston Alexander	def.	Alessio Sakara	TKO (knee and punches)	1	1:01
Preliminary card
Lightweight	Gleison Tibau	def.	Terry Etim	Decision (unanimous) (30–27, 30–27, 30–27)	3	5:00
Light Heavyweight	Thiago Silva	def.	Tomasz Drwal	TKO (punches)	2	4:23
Lightweight	Dennis Siver	def.	Naoyuki Kotani	KO (punch)	2	2:04
Welterweight	Jess Liaudin	def.	Anthony Torres	TKO (punches)	1	4:10	(Note: This bout aired on the broadcast after the Kongo-Cro Cop fight.)

== Bonus awards ==
The following fighters received $40,000 bonuses.

- Fight of the Night: Marcus Davis vs. Paul Taylor
- Knockout of the Night: Houston Alexander
- Submission of the Night: Marcus Davis

== See also ==
- List of UFC champions
- List of UFC events
- 2007 in UFC
