= UFC 76 =

UFC mixed martial arts event in 2007

UFC 76: Knockout
- The poster for UFC 76: Knockout
- Promotion: Ultimate Fighting Championship
- Date: September 22, 2007
- Venue: Honda Center
- City: Anaheim, California
- Attendance: 13,770 (11,817 paid)
- Total gate: $1,985,000
- Buyrate: 475,000

Event chronology
UFC Fight Night: Thomas vs. Florian	UFC 76: Knockout	UFC 77: Hostile Territory

UFC 76: Knockout was a mixed martial arts (MMA) pay-per-view event held by the Ultimate Fighting Championship. The event took place on September 22, 2007, at the Honda Center in Anaheim, California. Although the event was advertised with the subtitle Knockout, the entire card produced no knockouts whatsoever.

== Background ==
The main event was anticipated to be Chuck Liddell versus Wanderlei Silva, a match between the two former champions of the UFC and PRIDE, respectively; however, the main event featured a fight between former Light Heavyweight Champion Chuck Liddell and The Ultimate Fighter 2 alum Keith Jardine, with both fighters returning from knockout losses at UFC 71.

Also appearing on the card was 2005 Pride Middleweight Grand Prix Champion and future UFC Light Heavyweight Champion Maurício Rua, who made his Octagon debut against TUF 1 winner Forrest Griffin.

Welterweight Diego Sanchez returned after his decision loss at UFC 69 to Josh Koscheck when he faced Jon Fitch, a training partner of Koscheck and a former Purdue University wrestler who was in the midst of a thirteen-fight win streak.

A scheduled bout between the light heavyweights Jason Lambert and Wilson Gouveia was removed from the card after Gouveia suffered a severely broken nose during training. A replacement for Gouveia was not found.

With the card left with only eight bouts instead of nine, the UFC scheduled a fight between Rich Clementi and Anthony Johnson to fill out the remainder of the card.

None of the preliminary bouts made it to the PPV due to the length of all the main card bouts.

== Results ==
Main card (PPV)
Weight class				Method	Round	Time	Notes
Light Heavyweight	Keith Jardine	def.	Chuck Liddell	Decision (split) (29–28, 28–29, 29–28)	3	5:00
Light Heavyweight	Forrest Griffin	def.	Maurício Rua	Submission (rear-naked choke)	3	4:45
Welterweight	Jon Fitch	def.	Diego Sanchez	Decision (split) (30–27, 28–29, 29–28)	3	5:00
Light Heavyweight	Lyoto Machida	def.	Kazuhiro Nakamura	Decision (unanimous) (30–27, 30–27, 30–27)	3	5:00	(Note: Nakamura testing positive for marijuana after the fight.)
Lightweight	Tyson Griffin	def.	Thiago Tavares	Decision (unanimous) (29–28, 30–27, 29–28)	3	5:00
Preliminary card
Catchweight (177 lbs)	Rich Clementi	def.	Anthony Johnson	Submission (rear-naked choke)	2	3:05
Lightweight	Jeremy Stephens	def.	Diego Saraiva	Decision (unanimous) (30–27, 30–27, 30–27)	3	5:00
Heavyweight	Christian Wellisch	def.	Scott Junk	Submission (heel hook)	1	3:19
Lightweight	Matt Wiman	def.	Michihiro Omigawa	Decision (unanimous) (29–28, 30–27, 29–28)	3	5:00

== Bonus awards ==
The following fighters received $40,000 bonuses.

- Fight of the Night: Tyson Griffin vs. Thiago Tavares
- Knockout of the Night: No bonus awarded.
- Submission of the Night: Forrest Griffin

== See also ==
- Ultimate Fighting Championship
- List of UFC champions
- List of UFC events
- 2007 in UFC
