= UFC 79 =

UFC mixed martial arts event in 2007

UFC 79: Nemesis
- The poster for UFC 79: Nemesis
- Promotion: Ultimate Fighting Championship
- Date: December 29, 2007
- Venue: Mandalay Bay Events Center
- City: Las Vegas, Nevada
- Attendance: 11,075 (10,968 paid)
- Total gate: $4,994,000
- Buyrate: 650,000

Event chronology
The Ultimate Fighter: Team Hughes vs. Team Serra Finale	UFC 79: Nemesis	UFC 80: Rapid Fire

UFC 79: Nemesis was a mixed martial arts (MMA) event held by the Ultimate Fighting Championship (UFC), that took place on December 29, 2007, at the Mandalay Bay Events Center in Las Vegas, Nevada.

== Background ==
The main events featured the fight between Chuck Liddell and Wanderlei Silva, as well as the rubber match between former UFC Welterweight Champions Georges St-Pierre and Matt Hughes for the interim Welterweight championship.

Additionally, Pride Light Heavyweight Rameau Thierry Sokoudjou made his UFC debut against undefeated Lyoto Machida.

The main event was originally scheduled to have The Ultimate Fighter 6 coaches Matt Serra and Matt Hughes for Serra's UFC Welterweight Championship, which Serra won at UFC 69: Shootout on April 7, 2007, in an upset victory over Georges St-Pierre. Serra, however, withdrew from the fight due to a back injury, Serra was replaced by St-Pierre, though the fight would now be contested for the interim Welterweight Championship, with the winner facing Serra afterwards.

== Results ==
Main card
Weight class				Method	Round	Time	Notes
Welterweight	Georges St-Pierre	def.	Matt Hughes	Submission (armbar)	2	4:54	(Note: For the interim UFC Welterweight Championship.)
Light Heavyweight	Chuck Liddell	def.	Wanderlei Silva	Decision (unanimous) (29–28, 30–27, 30–27)	3	5:00
Heavyweight	Eddie Sanchez	def.	Soa Palelei	TKO (punches)	3	3:24
Light Heavyweight	Lyoto Machida	def.	Rameau Thierry Sokoudjou	Submission (arm-triangle choke)	2	4:20
Lightweight	Rich Clementi	def.	Melvin Guillard	Submission (rear-naked choke)	1	4:40
Preliminary card
Light Heavyweight	James Irvin	def.	Luiz Cane	Disqualification (illegal knee)	1	1:51
Lightweight	Manvel Gamburyan	def.	Nate Mohr	Submission (ankle lock)	1	1:31	(Note: This bout was aired on the broadcast following the St-Pierre vs Hughes bout.)
Middleweight	Dean Lister	def.	Jordan Radev	Decision (unanimous) (30–27, 30–27, 30–27)	3	5:00
Welterweight	Roan Carneiro	def.	Tony DeSouza	TKO (punches)	2	3:33
Lightweight	Mark Bocek	def.	Doug Evans	Decision (unanimous) (29–28, 29–28, 29–28)	3	5:00

== Bonus awards ==
The following fighters received $50,000 bonuses.

- Fight of the Night: Chuck Liddell vs. Wanderlei Silva
- Knockout of the Night: Eddie Sanchez
- Submission of the Night: Georges St-Pierre

== See also ==
- Ultimate Fighting Championship
- List of UFC champions
- List of UFC events
- 2007 in UFC
