= 2007 in UFC =

Mixed martial arts events

Information
- First date: January 25, 2007
- Last date: December 29, 2007

Events
- Total events: 19
- UFC: 13
- UFC Fight Night: 4
- TUF Finale events: 2

Fights
- Total fights: 171
- Title fights: 9

Chronology
2006 in UFC	2007 in UFC	2008 in UFC

The year 2007 was the 15th year in the history of the Ultimate Fighting Championship (UFC), a mixed martial arts promotion based in the United States. In 2007 the UFC held 19 events beginning with, UFC Fight Night: Evans vs. Salmon.

== 2007 UFC.com awards ==
2007 UFC.COM Awards
No	Best Fighter	The Upsets	The Submissions	The Knockouts	The Fights
1	Quinton Jackson	Matt Serra defeats Georges St-Pierre 1 UFC 69	Forrest Griffin defeats Maurício Rua 1 UFC 76	Gabriel Gonzaga defeats Mirko Cro Cop 1 UFC 70	Roger Huerta defeats Clay Guida; The Ultimate Fighter 6 Finale
2	Anderson Silva	Forrest Griffin defeats Maurício Rua 1 UFC 76	Chris Lytle defeats Jason Gilliam; UFC 73	Quinton Jackson defeats Chuck Liddell 2 UFC 71	Frankie Edgar defeats Tyson Griffin; UFC 67
3	Kenny Florian	Gabriel Gonzaga defeats Mirko Cro Cop 1 UFC 70	Roger Huerta defeats Clay Guida; The Ultimate Fighter 6 Finale	Houston Alexander defeats Keith Jardine; UFC 71	Chuck Liddell defeats Wanderlei Silva; UFC 79
4	Randy Couture	Jake O'Brien defeats Heath Herring; UFC Fight Night: Evans vs. Salmon	Marcus Davis defeats Paul Taylor; UFC 75	Rashad Evans defeats Sean Salmon; UFC Fight Night: Evans vs. Salmon	Jon Koppenhaver defeats Jared Rollins; The Ultimate Fighter 6 Finale
5	Georges St-Pierre	Houston Alexander defeats Keith Jardine; UFC 71	Georges St-Pierre defeats Matt Serra 2 UFC 79	Matt Serra defeats Georges St-Pierre 1 UFC 69	Spencer Fisher defeats Sam Stout; UFC Fight Night: Stout vs. Fisher
6	Forrest Griffin	Quinton Jackson defeats Chuck Liddell 2 UFC 71	Din Thomas defeats Jeremy Stephens; UFC 71	Chris Leben defeats Terry Martin; UFC Fight Night: Thomas vs. Florian	Nate Quarry defeats Pete Sell; UFC Fight Night: Thomas vs. Florian
7	Jon Fitch	Keith Jardine defeats Chuck Liddell; UFC 76	B.J. Penn defeats Jens Pulver; The Ultimate Fighter 5 Finale	Jon Koppenhaver defeats Jared Rollins; The Ultimate Fighter 6 Finale	Tyson Griffin defeats Thiago Tavares; UFC 76
8	Roger Huerta	Cheick Kongo defeats Mirko Cro Cop; UFC 75	Martin Kampmann defeats Drew McFedries; UFC 68	Nate Quarry defeats Pete Sell; UFC Fight Night: Thomas vs. Florian	Roger Huerta defeats Leonard Garcia; UFC 69
9	Matt Serra	Randy Couture defeats Tim Sylvia; UFC 68	Matt Arroyo defeats John Kolosci; The Ultimate Fighter 6 Finale	Anderson Silva defeats Rich Franklin; UFC 77	Randy Couture defeats Tim Sylvia; UFC 68
10	Kenny Florian (Tie); Marcus Davis (Tie)	Yushin Okami defeats Mike Swick at UFC 69 (Tie); Josh Koscheck defeats Diego Sanchez at UFC 69 (Tie)	Joe Stevenson defeats Melvin Guillard; UFC Fight Night: Stevenson vs. Guillard	Houston Alexander defeats Alessio Sakara; UFC 75	Matt Grice defeats Jason Black at UFC 77 (Tie); Tyson Griffin defeats Clay Guida at UFC 72 (Tie)
Ref					

== Debut UFC fighters ==
The following fighters fought their first UFC fight in 2007:

ISO	Fighter	Division
(Japan)	Akihiro Gono	Welterweight
(United States)	Alberto Crane	Lightweight
(United States)	Allen Berube	Lightweight
(United States)	Alvin Robinson	Lightweight
(Chinese Taipei)	Andy Wang	Lightweight
(United States)	Anthony Johnson	Welterweight
(Brazil)	Antônio Rodrigo Nogueira	Heavyweight
(United States)	Ben Saunders	Welterweight
(United States)	Billy Miles	Welterweight
(United States)	Brandon Melendez	Lightweight
(United States)	Brian Geraghty	Lightweight
(United States)	Chad Reiner	Welterweight
(United States)	Cole Miller	Lightweight
(Republic of Ireland)	Colin Robinson	Heavyweight
(United States)	Dan Barrera	Welterweight
(Brazil)	Demian Maia	Middleweight
(Germany)	Dennis Siver	Lightweight
(United States)	Dorian Price	Welterweight
(United States)	Doug Evans	Lightweight
(Brazil)	Edilberto de Oliveira	Middleweight
(Brazil)	Fabrício Werdum	Heavyweight
(United States)	Floyd Sword	Lightweight
(United States)	Frankie Edgar	Lightweight
(Australia)	George Sotiropoulos	Lightweight
(United States)	Gray Maynard	Lightweight
(United States)	Heath Herring	Heavyweight
(United States)	Houston Alexander	Light Heavyweight

ISO	Fighter	Division
(United States)	Jared Rollins	Welterweight
(United States)	Jason Black	Lightweight
(United States)	Jason Gilliam	Welterweight
(United States)	Jason Reinhardt	Bantamweight
(England)	Jason Tan	Welterweight
(United States)	Jeff Cox	Lightweight
(United States)	Jeremy Stephens	Lightweight
(France)	Jess Liaudin	Welterweight
(United States)	Joe Veres	Lightweight
(United States)	John Halverson	Lightweight
(United States)	John Kolosci	Welterweight
(United States)	Jon Koppenhaver	Welterweight
(Bulgaria)	Jordan Radev	Middleweight
(United States)	Justin McCully	Heavyweight
(Japan)	Kazuhiro Nakamura	Light Heavyweight
(United States)	Leonard Garcia	Lightweight
(Brazil)	Luiz Cane	Light Heavyweight
(United States)	Luke Caudillo	Lightweight
(Brazil)	Lyoto Machida	Light Heavyweight
(United States)	Mac Danzig	Lightweight
(Armenia)	Manny Gamburyan	Lightweight
(Brazil)	Marcus Aurélio	Lightweight
(Canada)	Mark Bocek	Lightweight
(United States)	Matt Arroyo	Welterweight
(United States)	Matt Grice	Featherweight
(Brazil)	Maurício Rua	Light Heavyweight
(Japan)	Michihiro Omigawa	Featherweight

ISO	Fighter	Division
(Croatia)	Mirko Cro Cop	Heavyweight
(Japan)	Naoyuki Kotani	Lightweight
(United States)	Nate Diaz	Lightweight
(United States)	Nate Mohr	Lightweight
(United States)	Paul Georgieff	Welterweight
(England)	Paul Taylor	Welterweight
(United States)	Rampage Jackson	Light Heavyweight
(Cameroon)	Rameau Thierry Sokoudjou	Light Heavyweight
(United States)	Rex Holman	Light Heavyweight
(United States)	Richie Hightower	Middleweight
(Brazil)	Roan Carneiro	Welterweight
(United States)	Rob Emerson	Lightweight
(Armenia)	Roman Mitichyan	Lightweight
(United States)	Ryan Jensen	Middleweight
(Japan)	Ryo Chonan	Welterweight
(United States)	Scott Junk	Heavyweight
(United States)	Sean Salmon	Light Heavyweight
(Australia)	Soa Palelei	Heavyweight
(United States)	Steven Lynch	Lightweight
(United States)	Tamdan McCrory	Welterweight
(England)	Terry Etim	Lightweight
(Brazil)	Thiago Silva	Light Heavyweight
(Brazil)	Thiago Tavares	Lightweight
(United States)	Tom Speer	Welterweight
(Poland)	Tomasz Drwal	Middleweight
(United States)	Troy Mandaloniz	Lightweight

== The Ultimate Fighter ==
Season	Finale	Division	Winner	Runner-up
TUF 5: Team Pulver vs. Team Penn	Jun 23, 2007	Lightweight	Nate Diaz	Manvel Gamburyan
TUF 6: Team Hughes vs. Team Serra	Dec 8, 2007	Welterweight	Mac Danzig	Tommy Speer

== Title fights ==
Title fights in 2007
Weight class				Method	Round	Time	Event	Notes
Heavyweight	Randy Couture	def.	Tim Sylvia (c)	Decision (unanimous) (50–45, 50–45, 50–45)	5	5:00	UFC 68: The Uprising	(Note: For the UFC Heavyweight Championship.)
Welterweight	Matt Serra	def.	Georges St-Pierre (c)	TKO (punches)	1	3:25	UFC 69: Shootout	(Note: For the UFC Welterweight Championship. Greatest upset in UFC history. Serra become first fighter in UFC history to win both Ultimate Fighter winner and champion.)
Light Heavyweight	Quinton Jackson	def.	Chuck Liddell (c)	TKO (punches)	1	1:53	UFC 71: Liddell vs. Jackson	(Note: For the UFC Light Heavyweight Championship.)
Middleweight	Anderson Silva (c)	def.	Nate Marquardt	TKO (punches)	1	4:50	UFC 73: Stacked	(Note: For the UFC Middleweight Championship.)
Lightweight	Sean Sherk (c)	def.	Hermes Franca	Decision (unanimous) (50–45, 50–45, 49–46)	5	5:00	UFC 73: Stacked	(Note: For the UFC Lightweight Championship; Both fighters failed their drug tests.)
Heavyweight	Randy Couture (c)	def.	Gabriel Gonzaga	TKO (punches)	3	1:37	UFC 74: Respect	(Note: For the UFC Heavyweight Championship.)
Light Heavyweight	Quinton Jackson (UFC Champion)	def.	Dan Henderson (Pride Champion)	Decision (unanimous) (48–47, 49–46, 49–46)	5	5:00	UFC 75: Champion vs. Champion	(Note: To unify the UFC Light Heavyweight Championship and PRIDE Middleweight Championship.)
Middleweight	Anderson Silva (c)	def.	Rich Franklin	TKO (knees)	2	1:07	UFC 77: Hostile Territory	(Note: For the UFC Middleweight Championship.)
Welterweight	Georges St-Pierre	def.	Matt Hughes	Verbal submission (armbar)	2	4:54	UFC 79: Nemesis	(Note: For the UFC Interim Welterweight Championship.)

== Events list ==
#	Event	Date	Venue	Location	Attendance
102	UFC 79: Nemesis	Dec 29, 2007	Mandalay Bay Events Center	Las Vegas, Nevada, U.S.	11,075
101	The Ultimate Fighter: Team Hughes vs. Team Serra Finale	Dec 8, 2007	Palms Casino Resort	Las Vegas, Nevada, U.S.	—N/a
100	UFC 78: Validation	Nov 17, 2007	Prudential Center	Newark, New Jersey, U.S.	14,071
099	UFC 77: Hostile Territory	Oct 20, 2007	U.S. Bank Arena	Cincinnati, Ohio, U.S.	16,054
098	UFC 76: Knockout	Sep 22, 2007	Honda Center	Anaheim, California, U.S.	13,770
097	UFC Fight Night: Thomas vs. Florian	Sep 19, 2007	Palms Casino Resort	Las Vegas, Nevada, U.S.	—N/a
096	UFC 75: Champion vs. Champion	Sep 8, 2007	The O_{2} arena	London, England, U.K.	16,235
095	UFC 74: Respect	Aug 25, 2007	Mandalay Bay Events Center	Las Vegas, Nevada, U.S.	11,065
094	UFC 73: Stacked	Jul 7, 2007	ARCO Arena	Sacramento, California, U.S.	13,183
093	The Ultimate Fighter: Team Pulver vs. Team Penn Finale	Jun 23, 2007	Palms Casino Resort	Las Vegas, Nevada, U.S.	—N/a
092	UFC 72: Victory	Jun 16, 2007	The Odyssey	Belfast, Northern Ireland	7,850
091	UFC Fight Night: Stout vs. Fisher	Jun 12, 2007	Seminole Hard Rock Hotel and Casino	Hollywood, Florida, U.S.	—N/a
090	UFC 71: Liddell vs. Jackson	May 26, 2007	MGM Grand Garden Arena	Las Vegas, Nevada, U.S.	14,728
089	UFC 70: Nations Collide	Apr 21, 2007	Manchester Evening News Arena	Manchester, England, U.K.	15,114
088	UFC 69: Shootout	Apr 7, 2007	Toyota Center	Houston, Texas, U.S.	15,269
087	UFC Fight Night: Stevenson vs. Guillard	Apr 5, 2007	Palms Casino Resort	Las Vegas, Nevada, U.S.	1,734
086	UFC 68: The Uprising	Mar 3, 2007	Nationwide Arena	Columbus, Ohio, U.S.	19,079
085	UFC 67: All or Nothing	Feb 3, 2007	Mandalay Bay Events Center	Las Vegas, Nevada, U.S.	10,787
084	UFC Fight Night: Evans vs. Salmon	Jan 25, 2007	Seminole Hard Rock Hotel and Casino	Hollywood, Florida, U.S.	5,287

== UFC Fight Night: Stevenson vs. Guillard ==
UFC Fight Night: Stevenson vs. Guillard
- The poster for UFC Fight Night: Stevenson vs. Guillard
- Promotion: Ultimate Fighting Championship
- Date: April 5, 2007
- Venue: Palms Casino Resort
- City: Las Vegas, Nevada
- Attendance: 1,734

Event chronology
UFC 68: The Uprising	UFC Fight Night: Stevenson vs. Guillard	UFC 69: Shootout

UFC Fight Night: Stevenson vs. Guillard (also known as UFC Fight Night 9) was an event held on April 5, 2007, at The Palms Casino Resort in Las Vegas, Nevada.

=== Results ===
Main Card
Weight class				Method	Round	Time	Notes
Lightweight	Joe Stevenson	def.	Melvin Guillard	Submission (guillotine choke)	1	0:27	(Note: Guillard tested positive for cocaine in a post-fight test.)
Heavyweight	Justin McCully	def.	Antoni Hardonk	Decision (unanimous) (30–27, 30–27, 30–27)	3	5:00
Lightweight	Kenny Florian	def.	Dokonjonosuke Mishima	Submission (rear-naked choke)	3	3:57
Preliminary card
Light Heavyweight	Wilson Gouveia	def.	Seth Petruzelli	Submission (guillotine choke)	2	0:39
Welterweight	Drew Fickett	def.	Keita Nakamura	Decision (unanimous) (29–27, 29–27, 30–26)	3	5:00	(Note: Nakamura was docked 1 point in round 2 due to 12-to-6 elbows.)
Lightweight	Kurt Pellegrino	def.	Nate Mohr	Submission (ankle lock)	1	2:58	(Note: This preliminary bout was aired on the broadcast after the McCully vs. Hardonk bout.)
Welterweight	Kuniyoshi Hironaka	def.	Forrest Petz	Decision (unanimous) (30–27, 30–27, 29–28)	3	5:00
Welterweight	Roan Carneiro	def.	Rich Clementi	Decision (unanimous) (30–27, 30–27, 30–27)	3	5:00
Lightweight	Thiago Tavares	def.	Naoyuki Kotani	Decision (unanimous) (30–27, 30–27, 30–27)	3	5:00

=== Bonus awards ===
- Fight of the Night: Kenny Florian vs. Dokonjonosuke Mishima
- Submission of the Night: Joe Stevenson and Kurt Pelligrino

== See also ==
- UFC
- List of UFC champions
- List of UFC events
