= UFC 68 =

UFC mixed martial arts event in 2007

UFC 68: The Uprising
- The poster for UFC 68: The Uprising
- Promotion: Ultimate Fighting Championship
- Date: March 3, 2007
- Venue: Nationwide Arena
- City: Columbus, Ohio
- Attendance: 19,049 (17,358 paid)
- Total gate: $3,014,000
- Buyrate: 534,000
- Total purse: $697,000 (disclosed)

Event chronology
UFC 67: All or Nothing	UFC 68: The Uprising	UFC Fight Night: Stevenson vs Guillard

UFC 68: The Uprising was a mixed martial arts (MMA) event held by the Ultimate Fighting Championship on March 3, 2007, at the Nationwide Arena in Columbus, Ohio.

== Background ==
UFC 68 was the first UFC event held in the state of Ohio, and coincided with the 2007 Arnold Sports Festival. The sold-out event produced the highest verifiable live attendance to date for a mixed martial arts event in North America with 19,079 spectators. At the time it was the largest attendance for a MMA event in the United States.

In the main event, UFC Heavyweight Champion Tim Sylvia was set to defend his title against Randy Couture, who was coming out of a 12-month retirement. Couture, a former UFC Heavyweight and Light Heavyweight Champion, hadn't fought as a heavyweight since UFC 39 in 2002.

Also featured at UFC 68 were the return bouts of former champions Matt Hughes at welterweight and Rich Franklin at middleweight.

== Results ==
Main card
Weight class				Method	Round	Time	Notes
Heavyweight	Randy Couture	def.	Tim Sylvia (c)	Decision (unanimous) (50–45, 50–45, 50–45)	5	5:00	(Note: For the UFC Heavyweight Championship.)
Middleweight	Martin Kampmann	def.	Drew McFedries	Submission (arm-triangle choke)	1	4:06
Middleweight	Rich Franklin	def.	Jason MacDonald	TKO (corner stoppage)	2	5:00	(Note: Excessive damage to MacDonald's right eye prompted his corner to signal for the end of the bout.)
Welterweight	Matt Hughes	def.	Chris Lytle	Decision (unanimous) (30-27, 30-27, 30-27)	3	5:00
Light Heavyweight	Jason Lambert	def.	Renato Sobral	KO (punch)	2	3:26
Preliminary card
Light Heavyweight	Matt Hamill	def.	Rex Holman	TKO (punches)	1	4:00
Welterweight	Jon Fitch	def.	Luigi Fioravanti	Submission (rear-naked choke)	2	3:05
Lightweight	Gleison Tibau	def.	Jason Dent	Decision (unanimous) (30–27, 30–27, 30–27)	3	5:00
Lightweight	Jamie Varner	def.	Jason Gilliam	Technical Submission (rear-naked choke)	1	1:34

== Bonus awards ==
- Fight of the Night: Jason Lambert vs. Renato Sobral
- Knockout of the Night: Jason Lambert
- Submission of the Night: Martin Kampmann

== See also ==
- Ultimate Fighting Championship
- List of UFC champions
- List of UFC events
- 2007 in UFC
