= Rich Clementi =

American mixed martial arts fighter

- Born: March 31, 1977 (age 49); Edison, New Jersey, United States
- Other names: No Love
- Nationality: American
- Height: 5 ft 9 in (1.75 m)
- Weight: 155 lb (70 kg; 11.1 st)
- Division: Lightweight; Welterweight
- Reach: 72 1/2 in (184 cm)
- Stance: Southpaw
- Fighting out of: Slidell, Louisiana, United States
- Team: Gladiator Gym
- Years active: 1999–2013

Professional boxing record
- Total: 1
- Wins: 0
- By knockout: 0
- Losses: 1
- By knockout: 0

Mixed martial arts record
- Total: 69
- Wins: 45
- By knockout: 13
- By submission: 23
- By decision: 9
- Losses: 23
- By knockout: 5
- By submission: 8
- By decision: 10
- Draws: 1

Other information
- Boxing record from BoxRec
- Mixed martial arts record from Sherdog

Richard Thomas Clementi (born March 31, 1977) is a former American mixed martial artist. Clementi has fought for the Ultimate Fighting Championships, Bellator, K-1 Hero's DREAM, King of the Cage, and Titan FC.

== Background ==
Clementi was born in Edison, New Jersey but moved frequently during his childhood along with his mother, as a result of her divorcing Clementi's stepfather. His passion from an early age was in wrestling but most of the schools that he attended did not have programs for the sport. Clementi enjoyed watching the UFC, which was in its early stages while he was growing up. He moved out of the house at age 15 and eventually settled back in New Jersey for his senior year of high school where he began wrestling again, going 15–2 in his senior year, but admits that he "wasn't very technical." Though he was a standout prep wrestler, Clementi joined the military out of high school and served in the United States Navy's Construction Battalion. He served in the military for eight years.

== Mixed martial arts career ==
=== Ultimate Fighting Championship ===
Clementi began his professional career in 1999 and amassed a 13–6 record before making his Ultimate Fighting Championship (UFC) debut at UFC 41, where he lost by submission to Yves Edwards. Clementi continued to fight in smaller promotions before appearing as a contestant on The Ultimate Fighter 4 reality show, which focused on promising fighters that had not succeeded in their UFC careers. With the namesake of "Team No Love" Clementi lost his preliminary bout against Shonie Carter by unanimous decision. He appeared on the undercard of the season finale as a lightweight, but lost by rear naked choke submission to Din Thomas.

Despite his losses, Clementi continued to appear in the UFC. He secured his first victory in the promotion via rear naked choke submission against Ross Pointon at UFC Fight Night 8, although the fight was not aired during the broadcast. After losing to Roan Carneiro at UFC Fight Night 9, Clementi alternated between appearing in the UFC and smaller promotions. He took a fight with Anthony Johnson at UFC 76 on two weeks' notice and won by rear naked choke submission. With the win, Clementi improved his official UFC record to 2–3.

Clementi followed up with a win at UFC 79 against Melvin Guillard. Guillard tapped from a rear naked choke. Prior to the match, Clementi and Guillard engaged in a war of words.

In the span of a month, Clementi racked up two more victories against Sam Stout and Terry Etim at UFC 83 and UFC 84 respectively. By this time, Clementi was riding a four-win streak in the UFC and a six-win streak in his career. The streak ended at UFC 90, where he lost to Gray Maynard by unanimous decision. Clementi followed up with an appearance at UFC Fight Night: Lauzon vs. Stephens, where he lost to Gleison Tibau by guillotine choke. With his second consecutive loss in the UFC, Clementi was cut from the promotion's roster.

=== Independent Promotions ===
On June 27, 2009, Clementi was in the main event for the first ever MMA fight in Pennsylvania. The promotion company UCFC held its "Rumble on the Rivers" event in Pittsburgh's Mellon Arena. Clementi was unable to continue the fight after only 40 seconds into the first round because of a broken collar bone after a takedown and the ringside doctor stopped the fight.

On November 29, 2009, Clementi headlined the event "Cage Wars: Nightmare" in Belfast, Northern Ireland and fought local prospect Chris Stringer, defeating him by triangle choke in the second round, after dominating the fight. Clementi followed that win by headlining the Team 3:16 – Season's Beatings Event in Shreveport, Louisiana, defeating Derrick Krantz in the first round via armbar.

On January 16 at the 5150 Fight League's "The New Year's Revolution" show Clementi defeated WEC veteran Mike Budnik via rear naked choke to win the 5150 Combat League Lightweight Championship and improving his record upon being cut from the UFC to 4–1.

=== Bellator Fighting Championships ===
Clementi was signed by Bellator and made his debut at Bellator 28 against Carey Vanier in a Bellator Lightweight tournament Qualifying bout, He lost by split decision.

On May 25, 2012, Clementi returned to Bellator at Bellator 70, he defeated Derek Campos by guillotine choke in round one.

Clementi faced Alexander Sarnavskiy on October 19, 2012 at Bellator 77 in a Lightweight Tournament Quarter Final bout. He won the fight by split decision.

Clementi faced Marcin Held in the Semifinals on November 16, 2012 at Bellator 81 and lost via toe hold submission in the second round.

On November 19, 2012 Clementi announced his retirement after competing in MMA for 13 years.

On July 24, 2013, Clementi announced he has come out of retirement and returned to Bellator to complete in the promotions Season Nine Lightweight Tournament, He was set to face UK Fighter Rob Sinclair on September 27, 2013 at Bellator 101 in the Quarterfinals. But on September 10, 2013, it was announced that Sinclair had to pull out of the fight due to a knee injury and was replaced by Ricardo Tirloni. He lost via unanimous decision.

== Personal life ==
Clementi spent eight years in the military with the Navy Seabees and was mobilized as a reservist after 9/11. He also runs "Rich Clementi's Gladiator Gym" in his hometown of Slidell, Louisiana. Clementi is divorced from his first wife and has two sons and a daughter with his second wife, Mandi.

== Championships and accomplishments ==
- 5150 Combat League / Xtreme Fighting League
  - 5150 Combat League Lightweight Championship (One time)

== Mixed martial arts record ==
Professional record breakdown
69 matches	45 wins	23 losses
By knockout	13	5
By submission	23	8
By decision	9	10
Draws	1	

Res.	Record	Opponent	Method	Event	Date	Round	Time	Location	Notes
Loss	45–23–1	Ricardo Tirloni	Decision (unanimous)	Bellator 101	September 27, 2013	3	5:00	Portland, Oregon, United States	Bellator Season Nine Lightweight Tournament Quarterfinal.
Loss	45–22–1	Marcin Held	Submission (toe hold)	Bellator 81	November 16, 2012	2	3:04	Kingston, Rhode Island, United States	Bellator Season Seven Lightweight Tournament Semifinal.
Win	45–21–1	Alexander Sarnavskiy	Decision (split)	Bellator 77	October 19, 2012	3	5:00	Reading, Pennsylvania, United States	Bellator Season Seven Lightweight Tournament Quarterfinal.
Win	44–21–1	Robert Washington	Submission (guillotine choke)	Rogue Warrior Championships	June 16, 2012	3	3:51	Las Vegas, Nevada, United States	
Win	43–21–1	Derek Campos	Submission (guillotine choke)	Bellator 70	May 25, 2012	1	4:18	New Orleans, Louisiana, United States	157 lb Catchweight.
Loss	42–21–1	Chris Clements	TKO (punches)	Score Fighting Series 3: Meltdown in the Valley	December 3, 2011	3	3:17	Sarnia, Ontario, Canada	Welterweight bout.
Win	42–20–1	Ronnie Rogers	Submission (rear-naked choke)	Victory Promotions: Clementi vs. Rogers	November 12, 2011	2	1:05	Lowell, Massachusetts, United States	
Loss	41–20–1	Shinya Aoki	Submission (neck crank)	Dream: Fight for Japan!	May 29, 2011	2	2:32	Saitama, Saitama, Japan	Non-title bout.
Loss	41–19–1	Reza Madadi	Decision (unanimous)	Superior Challenge 7	April 30, 2011	3	5:00	Stockholm, Sweden	For Superior Challenge Lightweight Championship.
Win	41–18–1	Josh Hinkle	Decision (unanimous)	TCF: Rogue Warrior Championships	April 8, 2011	3	5:00	El Paso, Texas, United States	
Loss	40–18–1	Aaron Derrow	Technical Submission (triangle choke)	Titan FC 16: Sylvia vs. Wagner	January 28, 2011	3	3:35	Kansas City, Kansas, United States	165 lb. Catchweight bout.
Win	40–17–1	Felipe Enomoto	Submission (armbar)	Cage Wars 13: Validation	December 10, 2010	3	4:25	Belfast, Northern Ireland	
Loss	39–17–1	Carey Vanier	Decision (split)	Bellator 28	September 9, 2010	3	5:00	New Orleans, Louisiana, United States	Bellator Lightweight Tournament Qualifier.
Win	39–16–1	Lenny Nelson	Submission (rear-naked choke)	SFC: Hostile Validation	July 31, 2010	1	3:32	Milwaukee, Wisconsin, United States	
Win	38–16–1	Glen Cordoza	Submission (armbar)	CFC: Full Force	June 25, 2010	2	2:21	Lafayette, Louisiana, United States	
Loss	37–16–1	Quinn Mulhern	TKO (punches)	KOTC: Vengeance	February 12, 2010	2	3:09	Mescalero, New Mexico, United States	Welterweight bout.
Win	37–15–1	Mike Budnik	Submission (rear-naked choke)	Xtreme Fighting League: New Year's Revolution	January 16, 2010	5	2:10	Tulsa, Oklahoma, United States	Won 5150 Combat League Lightweight Championship.
Win	36–15–1	Derrick Krantz	Submission (armbar)	Team 3:16 MMA: Season's Beatings	December 12, 2009	1	4:54	Shreveport, Louisiana, United States	
Win	35–15–1	Chris Stringer	Submission (triangle choke)	CWC: Nightmare	November 29, 2009	2	3:11	Belfast, Northern Ireland	
Loss	34–15–1	Kyle Jensen	TKO (injury)	UCFC Rumble on the Rivers	June 27, 2009	1	0:40	Pittsburgh, Pennsylvania, United States	Welterweight bout.
Win	34–14–1	Omar Zapata	Submission (arm-triangle choke)	Adrenaline MMA 3: Bragging Rights	June 13, 2009	1	4:16	Birmingham, Alabama, United States	Welterweight bout.
Loss	33–14–1	Gleison Tibau	Submission (guillotine choke)	UFC Fight Night: Lauzon vs. Stephens	February 7, 2009	1	4:35	Tampa, Florida, United States	
Loss	33–13–1	Gray Maynard	Decision (unanimous)	UFC 90	October 25, 2008	3	5:00	Rosemont, Illinois, United States	
Win	33–12–1	Terry Etim	Decision (unanimous)	UFC 84	May 24, 2008	3	5:00	Las Vegas, Nevada, United States	
Win	32–12–1	Sam Stout	Decision (split)	UFC 83	April 19, 2008	3	5:00	Montreal, Quebec, Canada	
Win	31–12–1	Melvin Guillard	Submission (rear-naked choke)	UFC 79	December 29, 2007	1	4:40	Las Vegas, Nevada, United States	
Win	30–12–1	Antoine Skinner	TKO (submission to punches)	NLE: Punishment at the PMAC	October 13, 2007	1	1:46	Baton Rouge, Louisiana, United States	Return to Lightweight.
Win	29–12–1	Anthony Johnson	Submission (rear-naked choke)	UFC 76	September 22, 2007	2	3:05	Anaheim, California, United States	
Win	28–12–1	Kyle Gibbons	Submission (rear-naked choke)	IFO: Wiuff vs. Salmon	September 1, 2007	1	2:18	Las Vegas, Nevada, United States	
Loss	27–12–1	Roan Carneiro	Decision (unanimous)	UFC Fight Night: Stevenson vs. Guillard	April 5, 2007	3	5:00	Las Vegas, Nevada, United States	
Win	27–11–1	Ross Pointon	Submission (rear-naked choke)	UFC Fight Night: Evans vs. Salmon	January 25, 2007	2	4:53	Hollywood, Florida, United States	Return to Welterweight.
Loss	26–11–1	Din Thomas	Submission (rear-naked choke)	The Ultimate Fighter: The Comeback Finale	November 11, 2006	2	3:11	Las Vegas, Nevada, United States	
Loss	26–10–1	Caol Uno	Decision (unanimous)	Hero's 4	March 15, 2006	2	5:00	Tokyo, Japan	
Win	26–9–1	Brian Dunn	TKO (punches)	Battle at the Boardwalk	February 17, 2006	1	4:48	Atlantic City, New Jersey, United States	
Win	25–9–1	Fabio Holanda	TKO (punches)	TKO 24: Eruption	January 28, 2006	3	4:20	Montreal, Quebec, Canada	
Win	24–9–1	Ryan Schultz	Submission (armbar)	Absolute Fighting Championships 14	December 10, 2005	1	3:39	Fort Lauderdale, Florida, United States	
Win	23–9–1	Chris Mickle	TKO (punches)	Extreme Challenge 64	October 15, 2005	1	2:51	Osceola, Iowa, United States	
Win	22–9–1	Daisuke Hanazawa	Decision (unanimous)	Euphoria: USA vs World	February 26, 2005	3	5:00	Atlantic City, New Jersey, United States	
Win	21–9–1	Henry Matamoros	Decision (unanimous)	Euphoria: Road to the Titles	October 15, 2004	3	5:00	Atlantic City, New Jersey, United States	
Win	20–9–1	Tom Kirk	Submission (rear-naked choke)	RCF: Showdown	July 17, 2004	1	N/A	Biloxi, Mississippi, United States	
Win	19–9–1	Eddie Yagin	TKO (doctor stoppage)	PXC 2: Chaos	May 22, 2004	3	N/A	Mangilao, Guam	
Win	18–9–1	Sergey Golyaev	Submission (triangle choke)	Euphoria: Russia vs USA	March 13, 2004	2	3:43	Atlantic City, New Jersey, United States	
Loss	17–9–1	David Gardner	Decision (unanimous)	Freestyle Fighting Championships 8	March 5, 2004	3	5:00	Biloxi, Mississippi, United States	
Loss	17–8–1	Marcus Aurélio	TKO (eye injury)	ZST: Grand Prix Final Round	January 11, 2004	1	0:40	Tokyo, Japan	
Win	17–7–1	Tomomi Iwama	Decision (unanimous)	ZST: Grand Prix Final Round	January 11, 2004	2	5:00	Tokyo, Japan	
Win	16–7–1	Naoyuki Kotani	Decision (unanimous)	ZST: Grand Prix Final Round	January 11, 2004	2	5:00	Tokyo, Japan	
Win	15–7–1	Aloisio Barros	Decision (unanimous)	ZST: Grand Prix Opening Round	November 23, 2003	2	5:00	Tokyo, Japan	
Draw	14–7–1	Hiroki Kotani	Draw	ZST 4: The Battle Field 4	September 7, 2003	3	5:00	Tokyo, Japan	
Win	14–7	Jon Weidler	KO (knee)	FFC 6: No Love	July 11, 2003	1	0:35	Biloxi, Mississippi, United States	
Loss	13–7	Yves Edwards	Submission (rear naked choke)	UFC 41	February 28, 2003	3	4:07	Atlantic City, New Jersey, United States	
Win	13–6	James Meals	TKO (punches)	Tuesday Night Fights	December 17, 2002	1	1:55	Davenport, Iowa, United States	
Win	12–6	Isaias Martinez	TKO (broken nose)	RFC 1: The Beginning	July 13, 2002	1	5:00	Las Vegas, Nevada, United States	
Win	11–6	Joe Jordan	Submission (armbar)	Freestyle Fighting Championships 2	May 4, 2002	1	2:05	Biloxi, Mississippi, United States	
Win	10–6	Justin James	Submission (rear-naked choke)	Rock 'N' Rumble 1	December 29, 2001	2	1:20	United States	
Win	9–6	Cedric Stewart	Submission (rear naked choke)	Extreme Challenge 44	September 15, 2001	1	2:23	Lake Charles, Louisiana, United States	
Win	8–6	Warren Donley	KO (punches)	RCF 11	May 10, 2001	2	0:30	United States	
Win	7–6	Danny Payne	Submission (neck crank)	RCF 10	March 31, 2001	1	1:37	Houma, Louisiana, United States	Drops to Lightweight
Win	6–6	Edwin Allseitz	Submission (kimura)	DFC: Submission Grappling Championships	March 17, 2001	1	3:36	Houston, Texas, United States	
Win	5–6	Jeremy Jiminez	Submission (armbar)	DFC: Submission Grappling Championships	March 17, 2001	1	2:15	Houston, Texas, United States	
Loss	4–6	Pete Spratt	TKO (doctor stoppage)	RCF 9	January 27, 2001	1	N/A	Houma, Louisiana, United States	
Win	4–5	Charles Bennett	TKO (submission to punches)	WEF: Rumble at the Rodeo 1	December 16, 2000	1	N/A	United States	
Loss	3–5	Steve Berger	Submission (armbar)	Dangerzone: Insane In Ft. Wayne	November 25, 2000	1	3:14	Fort Wayne, Indiana, United States	
Loss	3–4	Rick McCoy	Decision	Dangerzone: Night of the Beast	October 28, 2000	2	15:00	Lynchburg, Virginia, United States	
Loss	3–3	Ben Earwood	Submission (armbar)	EC 36: Extreme Challenge 36	August 26, 2000	1	8:32	Davenport, Iowa, United States	
Win	3–2	Dymitrius Wilson	TKO (punches)	WVF: Cage Brawl	August 19, 2000	1	4:40	Chalmette, Louisiana, United States	
Win	2–2	Aristides Britto	TKO (submission to punches)	RCF 6: Reality Combat Fighting 6	June 24, 2000	1	2:19	Thibodaux, Louisiana, United States	Welterweight bout.
Win	1–2	Scott Melia	TKO (submission to punches)	RCF 6: Reality Combat Fighting 6	June 24, 2000	1	1:28	Thibodaux, Louisiana, United States	
Loss	0–2	Rick Thompson	Decision	RCF 3: Return of the Rage	January 28, 2000	1	18:00	Metairie, Louisiana, United States	
Loss	0–1	Chris Seifert	Decision (unanimous)	WEF 7: Stomp in the Swamp	October 9, 1999	3	2:00	Kenner, Louisiana, United States	

== Professional boxing record ==
1 fight	0 wins	1 loss
By decision	0	1

No.	Result	Record	Opponent	Method	Round, time	Date	Location	Notes
1	Loss	0–1	(United States) Martin Verdin	MD	4	May 27, 2004	(United States) Alario Center, Westwego, Louisiana	Professional debut

== Filmography ==
- 2012 — Dragon Eyes
- 2012- Philly Kid-Sanchez

== See also ==
- List of Bellator MMA alumni
- List of mixed martial artists with professional boxing records
- List of male mixed martial artists
