= UFC 72 =

UFC mixed martial arts event in 2007

UFC 72: Victory
- The poster for UFC 72: Victory
- Promotion: Ultimate Fighting Championship
- Date: June 16, 2007
- Venue: The Odyssey
- City: Belfast, Northern Ireland
- Attendance: 8,000
- Total gate: £700,000 (approx. $1.2 million)
- Buyrate: 200,000

Event chronology
| UFC Fight Night: Stout vs Fisher | UFC 72: Victory | The Ultimate Fighter: Team Pulver vs. Team Penn Finale |

UFC 72: Victory was a mixed martial arts event held by the Ultimate Fighting Championship. The event took place Saturday, June 16, 2007 at The Odyssey in Belfast, Northern Ireland.

== Background ==
UFC 72 continued the UFC's expansion into Europe, as it was the third event to take place in Europe and the United Kingdom after UFC 38 in 2002 (Royal Albert Hall in London, United Kingdom) and UFC 70 in April 2007 (MEN Arena in Manchester, United Kingdom). The card aired on pay-per-view in North America and via Setanta Sports in the United Kingdom and Ireland.

Martin Kampmann was scheduled to fight Rich Franklin, but was forced to withdraw due to injury. Yushin Okami replaced Kampmann in the main event.

Jake O'Brien was scheduled to fight Tom Murphy, but was forced to withdraw due to injury. There was no replacement for O'Brien, and Murphy did not fight on the UFC 72 card.

== Results ==
Main card
| Weight class | | | | Method | Round | Time | Notes |
|---|---|---|---|---|---|---|---|
| Middleweight | Rich Franklin | def. | Yushin Okami | Decision (unanimous) (29–28, 29–28, 29–28) | 3 | 5:00 |
| Light Heavyweight | Forrest Griffin | def. | Hector Ramirez | Decision (unanimous) (30–27, 30–27, 30–27) | 3 | 5:00 |
| Middleweight | Jason MacDonald | def. | Rory Singer | TKO (punches and elbows) | 2 | 3:18 |
| Lightweight | Tyson Griffin | def. | Clay Guida | Decision (split) (29–28, 28–29, 29–28) | 3 | 5:00 |
| Middleweight | Ed Herman | def. | Scott Smith | Submission (rear-naked choke) | 2 | 2:25 |
Preliminary card
| Heavyweight | Eddie Sanchez | def. | Colin Robinson | TKO (punches) | 2 | 0:32 |
| Welterweight | Dustin Hazelett | def. | Steven Lynch | Submission (anaconda choke) | 1 | 2:50 | (Note: In the official decision, the choke was mistakenly called a D'Arce choke) |
| Welterweight | Marcus Davis | def. | Jason Tan | KO (punch) | 1 | 1:15 |

== Bonus awards ==
The following fighters received $40,000 bonuses.

- Fight of the Night: Tyson Griffin vs. Clay Guida
- Knockout of the Night: Marcus Davis
- Submission of the Night: Ed Herman

== See also ==
- Ultimate Fighting Championship
- List of UFC champions
- List of UFC events
- 2007 in UFC
