= UFC 67 =

UFC mixed martial arts event in 2007

UFC 67: All or Nothing
- The poster for UFC 67: All or Nothing
- Promotion: Ultimate Fighting Championship
- Date: February 3, 2007
- Venue: Mandalay Bay Events Center
- City: Las Vegas, Nevada
- Attendance: 10,227 (8,700 paid)
- Total gate: $2,767,130
- Buyrate: 350,000
- Total purse: $803,000 (disclosed)

Event chronology
UFC Fight Night: Evans vs Salmon	UFC 67: All or Nothing	UFC 68: The Uprising

UFC 67: All or Nothing was a mixed martial arts event held by Ultimate Fighting Championship. The event was held Saturday, February 3, 2007, at the Mandalay Bay Events Center on the Las Vegas Strip in Nevada. It was also the first UFC pay-per-view broadcast in High-Definition.

== Background ==
This event was the first UFC pay-per-view event since UFC 60 to have no championship bouts on the card. In the main event, the middleweight winner of The Ultimate Fighter 4, Travis Lutter was scheduled to challenge middleweight champion Anderson Silva for the middleweight title, however he was not able to make weight and the fight was changed to a non-title contest.

The welterweight winner of The Ultimate Fighter 4, Matt Serra, was also scheduled to challenge the welterweight champion Georges St-Pierre. However, St.-Pierre injured a knee during training and the bout was postponed.

Two former PRIDE stars made their debuts in the UFC at this event. 2006 PRIDE Open-Weight Grand Prix Champion Mirko Cro Cop made his debut in the United States and in the UFC at UFC 67 against Eddie Sanchez.

Quinton Jackson — whose contract was acquired by the UFC after Zuffa's buyout of the World Fighting Alliance — made his debut against Marvin Eastman, whose contract with the WFA was also bought by Zuffa. Eastman has an early win over Jackson in the KOTC promotion. It was also the UFC debut of future Light Heavyweight Champion, Lyoto Machida and also the debut of the future Lightweight Champion Frankie Edgar.

== Results ==
Main Card
Weight class				Method	Round	Time	Notes
Middleweight	Anderson Silva (c)	def.	Travis Lutter	Submission (triangle choke with elbows)	2	2:11	(Note: The bout, originally scheduled to be a title defense for Silva, was changed to a non-title match when Travis Lutter failed to weigh in at the contracted weight for the title fight.)
Heavyweight	Mirko Cro Cop	def.	Eddie Sanchez	TKO (punches)	1	4:33
Light Heavyweight	Quinton Jackson	def.	Marvin Eastman	KO (punches)	2	3:49
Lightweight	Roger Huerta	def.	John Halverson	TKO (punches)	1	0:18
Middleweight	Patrick Côté	def.	Scott Smith	Decision (unanimous) (30–27, 30–27, 30–27)	3	5:00
Preliminary card
Middleweight	Terry Martin	def.	Jorge Rivera	KO (punches)	1	0:14	(Note: This bout was aired on the pay-per-view broadcast.)
Lightweight	Frankie Edgar	def.	Tyson Griffin	Decision (unanimous) (29–28, 29–28, 30–27)	3	5:00	(Note: This bout was aired on the pay-per-view broadcast.)
Light Heavyweight	Lyoto Machida	def.	Sam Hoger	Decision (unanimous) (30–27, 30–27, 30–27)	3	5:00
Lightweight	Dustin Hazelett	def.	Diego Saraiva	Decision (unanimous) (30–27, 30–27, 30–27)	3	5:00

== Bonus awards ==
- Fight of the Night: Frankie Edgar vs. Tyson Griffin
- Knockout of the Night: Terry Martin
- Submission of the Night: Anderson Silva

== See also ==
- Ultimate Fighting Championship
- List of UFC champions
- List of UFC events
- 2007 in UFC
