= Tyson Griffin =

American mixed martial arts fighter

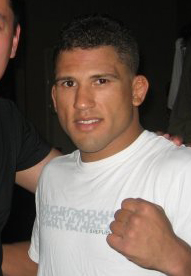
- Born: Tyson Lee Griffin; April 20, 1984 (age 42); Sacramento, California, U.S.
- Height: 5 ft 6 in (1.68 m)
- Weight: 155 lb (70 kg; 11.1 st)
- Division: Featherweight (2004-2006, 2011); Lightweight (2006-2010, 2012-2014, 2018)
- Reach: 69 in (175 cm)
- Fighting out of: Las Vegas, Nevada, U.S.
- Team: American Kickboxing Academy
- Rank: Black belt in Brazilian Jiu-Jitsu
- Years active: 2004–2014, 2018

Mixed martial arts record
- Total: 25
- Wins: 17
- By knockout: 6
- By submission: 3
- By decision: 8
- Losses: 8
- By knockout: 3
- By decision: 5

Other information
- University: Santa Rosa Junior College
- Notable school: Albany High School
- Website: http://www.tysongriffin.com/
- Mixed martial arts record from Sherdog

Tyson Lee Griffin (born April 20, 1984) is an American retired mixed martial artist who competed in the lightweight division. He competed for the UFC, Strikeforce, the RFA, and the World Series of Fighting.

== Background ==
Griffin was a standout wrestler at Albany High School and moved on to wrestle at Santa Rosa Junior College before dropping out. He began training at David Terrell's NorCal Fighting Alliance and the Cesar Gracie Academy. During his first mixed martial arts training session, Terrell cut two gashes over Griffin's left eye, requiring stitches. Griffin states that he committed himself to a career in MMA while in the hospital waiting room. His mother supported him during his first year of training, but after his professional debut he had to get side jobs to support himself through his early career.

== Mixed martial arts career ==
Tyson Griffin began his professional career in 2004 in the Gladiator Challenge promotion. In his third bout, he dropped to featherweight to earn a TKO victory over future World Extreme Cagefighting featherweight champion Urijah Faber, which stood as Faber's only defeat for over three years. Griffin went on to win his first six fights before facing Duane Ludwig at Strikeforce: Revenge. He won the bout by TKO in the first round, attracting the attention of major promotions. After considering offers from Pride Fighting Championship and the UFC, Griffin signed with the UFC so that he could continue to fight stateside. While cornering for David Terrel at UFC 59 in Las Vegas, Griffin had an opportunity to meet members of the Xtreme Couture camp for the first time.

=== Ultimate Fighting Championship ===
Griffin made his UFC debut at UFC 63 against David Lee. He won the bout via rear-naked choke submission in the first round, and later used the prize money to move to Las Vegas and joined the Xtreme Couture camp. Former teammate Nick Diaz criticized Griffin as a "gym jumper", but Griffin rejected the accusation. He began 2007 with a fight against Frank Edgar at UFC 67. The back-and-forth bout ended with Edgar trapped in a tight kneebar, but the judges unanimously scored the bout in his favor, handing Griffin his first professional loss. He rebounded with two decision victories over Clay Guida and Thiago Tavares at UFC 72 and UFC 76, respectively. All three of his bouts in 2007 were judged in the top 10 best of year.

In 2008, Griffin won unanimous decisions over Gleison Tibau at UFC 81 and Marcus Aurélio at UFC 86.

He next faced Sean Sherk at UFC 90, in a fight with title contention implications. In another three-round war, Griffin lost by unanimous decision, after a hard fought fight.

Griffin defeated Rafael dos Anjos at UFC Fight Night: Condit vs Kampmann via unanimous decision.

He won against Hermes Franca via KO in the second round at UFC 103, earning his first victory via stoppage in three years.

Griffin was scheduled to face Jim Miller on January 2, 2010 at UFC 108, but was forced off the card with an injury.

Griffin fought Xtreme Couture training partner Evan Dunham on June 12, 2010 at UFC 115. He lost the fight via split decision.

Griffin faced former PRIDE Lightweight Champion, Takanori Gomi on August 1, 2010 at UFC Live: Jones vs. Matyushenko, replacing an injured Joe Stevenson. Griffin lost via KO (punch) at 1:04 of the first round. This marked the first time Griffin had lost back to back fights, as well as the first time he had been stopped in a fight as all of his previous losses had gone to a decision. Griffin was visibly upset with the loss; pacing around the octagon and refusing to shake Gomi's hand.

Griffin was defeated by Nik Lentz on November 20, 2010 at UFC 123 by split decision. After the bout it was revealed that Griffin had failed a post-fight drug screening, testing positive for marijuana.

Griffin next faced Manvel Gamburyan in his featherweight debut on June 26, 2011 at UFC on Versus 4. He won the fight via majority decision.

Griffin lost to Bart Palaszewski on October 29, 2011 at UFC 137 via first-round KO. During weigh ins, Griffin had failed to make the featherweight limit, coming in 3 pounds over. Griffin was fined 25 percent of his earnings and the bout took place at a catchweight of 148 lb. It wasn't announced until June 2012 that he was released from the promotion shortly after the fight.

=== Resurrection Fighting Alliance ===
Griffin signed a 3-fight contract with the Resurrection Fighting Alliance (RFA).

Tyson faced TUF 8 winner Efraín Escudero in a lightweight bout at Resurrection Fighting Alliance 4 on November 2, 2012. He won the fight via unanimous decision.

=== World Series Of Fighting ===
In June 2013, it was announced that Griffin had signed a multi-fight deal with World Series of Fighting. On August 10, 2013, he faced Strikeforce veteran Gesias Cavalcante. He lost the fight via TKO in the third round.

Griffin faced Luiz Firmino at WSOF 10 on June 21, 2014. He lost the fight via unanimous decision.

=== Universal Reality Combat Championship ===
On August 24, 2018, after a four year hiatus, Griffin returned to face former Bellator fighter, Jordan Bailey at URCC 34. Griffin won the fight via unanimous decision.

== Championships and achievements ==
- Ultimate Fighting Championship
  - Fight of the Night (Five times) vs. Frankie Edgar, Clay Guida, Thiago Tavares, Sean Sherk and Rafael dos Anjos
  - Submission of the Night (One time) vs. David Lee
  - UFC.com Awards
    - 2007: Ranked #2 Fight of the Year vs. Frankie Edgar, Ranked #7 Fight of the Year vs. Thiago Tavares & Ranked #10 Fight of the Year vs. Clay Guida (Tied with Matt Grice vs. Jason Black)
    - 2008: Ranked #4 Fight of the Year vs. Sean Sherk
    - 2009: Ranked #8 Fight of the Year vs. Rafael dos Anjos
- Gladiator Challenge
  - GC Featherweight Championship (One time)

== Mixed martial arts record ==
Professional record breakdown
25 matches	17 wins	8 losses
By knockout	6	3
By submission	3	0
By decision	8	5

Res.	Record	Opponent	Method	Event	Date	Round	Time	Location	Notes
Win	17–8	Jordan Bailey	Decision (unanimous)	URCC 34	August 4, 2018	3	5:00	Richmond, California, United States	
Loss	16–8	Luiz Firmino	Decision (unanimous)	WSOF 10	June 21, 2014	3	5:00	Las Vegas, Nevada, United States	
Loss	16–7	Gesias Cavalcante	TKO (punches)	WSOF 4	August 10, 2013	3	1:37	Ontario, California, United States	
Win	16–6	Efraín Escudero	Decision (unanimous)	RFA 4: Griffin vs. Escudero	November 2, 2012	3	5:00	Las Vegas, Nevada, United States	Return to Lightweight.
Loss	15–6	Bart Palaszewski	KO (punches)	UFC 137	October 29, 2011	1	2:45	Las Vegas, Nevada, United States	148 lb Catchweight bout; Griffin missed weight.
Win	15–5	Manvel Gamburyan	Decision (majority)	UFC Live: Kongo vs. Barry	June 26, 2011	3	5:00	Pittsburgh, Pennsylvania, United States	Return to Featherweight.
Loss	14–5	Nik Lentz	Decision (split)	UFC 123	November 20, 2010	3	5:00	Auburn Hills, Michigan, United States	
Loss	14–4	Takanori Gomi	KO (punch)	UFC Live: Jones vs. Matyushenko	August 1, 2010	1	1:04	San Diego, California, United States	
Loss	14–3	Evan Dunham	Decision (split)	UFC 115	June 12, 2010	3	5:00	Vancouver, British Columbia, Canada	
Win	14–2	Hermes França	KO (punches)	UFC 103	September 19, 2009	2	3:26	Dallas, Texas, United States	159 lb Catchweight bout; Franca missed weight.
Win	13–2	Rafael dos Anjos	Decision (unanimous)	UFC Fight Night: Condit vs. Kampmann	April 1, 2009	3	5:00	Nashville, Tennessee, United States	Fight of the Night.
Loss	12–2	Sean Sherk	Decision (unanimous)	UFC 90	October 25, 2008	3	5:00	Rosemont, Illinois, United States	Fight of the Night.
Win	12–1	Marcus Aurélio	Decision (unanimous)	UFC 86	July 5, 2008	3	5:00	Las Vegas, Nevada, United States	
Win	11–1	Gleison Tibau	Decision (unanimous)	UFC 81	February 2, 2008	3	5:00	Las Vegas, Nevada, United States	
Win	10–1	Thiago Tavares	Decision (unanimous)	UFC 76	September 22, 2007	3	5:00	Anaheim, California, United States	Fight of the Night.
Win	9–1	Clay Guida	Decision (split)	UFC 72	June 16, 2007	3	5:00	Belfast, Northern Ireland	Fight of the Night. Fight of the Year.
Loss	8–1	Frankie Edgar	Decision (unanimous)	UFC 67	February 3, 2007	3	5:00	Las Vegas, Nevada, United States	Fight of the Night.
Win	8–0	David Lee	Submission (rear-naked choke)	UFC 63	September 23, 2006	1	1:50	Anaheim, California, United States	Submission of the Night.
Win	7–0	Duane Ludwig	TKO (punches)	Strikeforce: Revenge	June 9, 2006	1	3:57	San Jose, California, United States	
Win	6–0	Chuck Kim	Submission (rear-naked choke)	GC 49: Face Off	April 8, 2006	1	3:34	Lakeport, California, United States	
Win	5–0	Melchor Manibusan	TKO (punches)	FFCF 5: Unleashed	January 27, 2006	1	4:05	Mangilao, Guam	Lightweight debut.
Win	4–0	Jorge Evangelista	KO (punches)	GC 46: Avalanche	December 11, 2005	1	3:14	Coarsegold, California, United States	
Win	3–0	Urijah Faber	TKO (punches)	GC 42: Summer Slam	September 10, 2005	3	0:05	Lakeport, California, United States	Won Gladiator Challenge Featherweight Championship.
Win	2–0	Cody Williams	Submission (rear-naked choke)	GC 36: Proving Grounds	April 9, 2005	1	2:05	Porterville, California, United States	
Win	1–0	Ryan Frost	TKO (punches)	GC 32: King of the Hill	November 18, 2004	1	1:16	Colusa, California, United States	
