= Thiago Tavares =

Brazilian martial artist

- Born: November 8, 1984 (age 41); Florianópolis, Santa Catarina, Brazil
- Height: 5 ft 7 in (1.70 m)
- Weight: 146 lb (66 kg; 10.4 st)
- Division: Lightweight; Featherweight
- Reach: 69 in (180 cm)
- Stance: Orthodox
- Fighting out of: Florianópolis, Santa Catarina, Brazil
- Team: Team Tavares; Brazilian Top Team
- Rank: 3rd degree black belt in Brazilian Jiu-Jitsu
- Years active: 2003–2018, 2020–present

Mixed martial arts record
- Total: 36
- Wins: 24
- By knockout: 4
- By submission: 15
- By decision: 5
- Losses: 11
- By knockout: 8
- By decision: 3
- Draws: 1

Other information
- Mixed martial arts record from Sherdog

Thiago Tavares (born November 8, 1984) is a Brazilian mixed martial artist and medical doctor who most recently competed in the Lightweight division. An 18-fight veteran of the UFC, he has also fought in the Professional Fighters League and Cage Warriors. During his tenure with the UFC, he was awarded "Fight of the Night" honors four times.

== Background ==
Born and raised in Brazil, Tavares began training in judo at the age of five and Brazilian jiu-jitsu at the age of nine.

== Mixed martial arts career ==
=== Early career ===
Tavares made his professional MMA debut in November 2003. He amassed an undefeated record of 10–0 in his first three years in the sport before being signed by the UFC.

=== Ultimate Fighting Championship ===
==== Lightweight ====
Tavares entered the UFC with an undefeated record and was highly regarded. Tavares outgrappled fellow UFC-newcomer Naoyuki Kotani to a unanimous decision, followed by a dominant submission victory over Jason Black. Tavares fought perennial contender Tyson Griffin to a unanimous decision loss, the first of his professional career, at UFC 76. They would win Fight of the Night award honors for their performance.

Thiago rebounded with a unanimous decision victory over Michihiro Omigawa at UFC Fight Night: Swick vs Burkman. Tavares was knocked out in his next bout by Matt Wiman and lost a unanimous decision to Kurt Pellegrino nearly three months later. Despite losses, Tavares received Fight of the Night award in both fights. This marked the first time Tavares lost two straight contests after beginning his career with twelve straight wins.

Tavares defeated TUF finalist Manvel Gamburyan via unanimous decision at UFC 94 in a close fight.

Tavares and Nik Lentz fought to a majority draw at UFC Fight Night: Maynard vs. Diaz. Tavares was docked a point in the third round for a second kick to the groin of Lentz. After the fight Lentz was interviewed and had shared with a reporter his belief that Tavares had intentionally kicked him in the groin and happened to crack Lentz's metal cup.

Tavares was scheduled to face Melvin Guillard on May 29, 2010, at UFC 114, but Tavares was forced off the card with an elbow injury. He was replaced by Waylon Lowe.

Tavares was set to face Willamy Freire at UFC Live: Jones vs. Matyushenko taking place August 1, 2010. However, on July 20, 2010, Freire withdrew because of an injury, forcing the bout to be cancelled.

Tavares faced UFC newcomer Pat Audinwood on September 25, 2010, at UFC 119, replacing an injured Aaron Riley. Tavares defeated Audinwood via submission (guillotine choke) in the first round.

Tavares then faced Shane Roller on March 3, 2011, at UFC Live: Sanchez vs. Kampmann. He lost the fight via KO in the second round. Though Tavares hurt Roller in the first round, he was unable to finish him. During the second round, Tavares was caught by a straight right from Roller that knocked him out.

Tavares defeated Spencer Fisher via second-round TKO on August 27, 2011, at UFC 134.

Tavares faced Sam Stout on January 14, 2012, at UFC 142. He won the fight via unanimous decision after utilizing takedowns with his top control for most of the fight.

Tavares was expected to face Tony Ferguson on May 5, 2012, at UFC on Fox 3, replacing an injured Dennis Hallman. However, Tavares was forced out of the bout with an injury and replaced by Michael Johnson.

Tavares was expected to face Dennis Hallman on September 1, 2012, at UFC 151. However, after UFC 151 was cancelled, Tavares/Hallman was then rescheduled to October 5, 2012, at UFC on FX 5. Just prior to the UFC on FX 5 weigh ins, Dennis Hallman alerted officials and Tavares that he would miss weight by 7 pounds. Tavares was given the option to take the fight anyway at a catchweight. He stated he would only fight if Hallman could make it within 3 lbs of the 156 lb. limit. Hallman couldn't make it in the allowed time and so the bout was cancelled.

Tavares next faced the undefeated Khabib Nurmagomedov on January 19, 2013, at UFC on FX: Belfort vs. Bisping. He lost the fight via knockout early in the first round. Following his loss to Nurmagomedov, it was announced that Tavares had tested positive for the banned substance drostanolone during his post-fight drug test and, subsequently, was suspended for nine months retroactive to January 19.

Tavares was expected to face Quinn Mulhern on November 9, 2013, at UFC Fight Night 32. However, Mulhern pulled out of the bout citing an injury and was replaced by Justin Salas. Tavares won the fight via submission in the first round.

==== Move to Featherweight ====
Tavares was expected to face promotional newcomer Zubaira Tukhugov in a featherweight bout on February 15, 2014, at UFC Fight Night 36. However, Tavares was forced out of the bout citing a rib injury and replaced by Douglas Silva de Andrade.

Tavares was expected to face Tom Niinimäki on May 31, 2014, at UFC Fight Night 41. However, Tavares pulled out of the bout citing another injury and was replaced by promotional newcomer Niklas Bäckström.

In his eventual featherweight debut, Tavares faced Robbie Peralta on August 16, 2014, at UFC Fight Night 47. Tavares won the fight via submission in the first round after completely dominating Peralta on the ground. The win also earned him his first Performance of the Night bonus award.

Tavares was expected to face Nik Lentz in a rematch on February 14, 2015, at UFC Fight Night 60. However, Tavares pulled out of the bout in late January citing yet another injury.

Tavares was expected to face Zubaira Tukhugov on June 6, 2015, at UFC Fight Night 68. However, Tukhugov was replaced by Brian Ortega. Tavares lost the back-and-forth fight via TKO in the third round. Despite the loss, Tavares was awarded his fourth Fight of the Night bonus award.

Tavares faced Clay Guida on November 7, 2015, at UFC Fight Night 77. He won the fight with a quick submission in the first round. The win also earned Tavares his second Performance of the Night bonus award.

Tavares next faced Doo Ho Choi on July 8, 2016, at The Ultimate Fighter 23 Finale Tavares lost the fight via KO in the first round. Afterwards, the promotion did not re-sign Tavares, making him a free agent.

=== Post-UFC career ===
After being released from the UFC, Tavares signed with Aspera FC and faced Mauricio Machado at Aspera FC 49 on February 18, 2017. He won the fight via first-minute knockout.

He was then scheduled to face Fabricio Oliveira at Aspera FC 50 on March 18, 2017, but withdrew from the bout due to an unknown reason.

==== Professional Fighters League ====
He was then signed to participate the Lightweight division of the inaugural season of PFL. His regular season begun with facing Robert Watley at PFL 2 on June 21, 2018. In the second round, Watley unintentionally kicked Tavares in the groin rendering him unable to continue after the five minute recovery time. Contrary to the unified rules, Watley was declared as the winner.

His second bout was against Arthur Estrázulas at PFL 5 on August 2, 2018. He won the fight via split decision and advanced to the playoffs.

In the quarter-finals Tavares faced Islam Mamedov at PFL 9 on October 13, 2018. He lost the bout via unanimous decision and was eliminated from the playoffs. However, Mamedov could not continue to the semi-finals and Tavares was brought to replace him against Rashid Magomedov. Tavares lost the bout via second-round technical knockout and was eliminated from the tournament. He subsequently retired from the sport in order to focus in his studies.

=== Return from retirement ===
Reaching the clinical phase of his studies, Tavares was able to train more consistently again and was scheduled to return from retirement against Laercio Alves dos Santos at Gladiator CF on July 22, 2020. However, the bout was then rescheduled to take place on October 24, 2020. Tavares won the fight via first-round knockout.

He is next expected to face Jean Carlos Liebl at Gladiator CF 54 on February 6, 2021.

Then, he is also expected to face Mauricio Ariel for the Super Lightweight Championship at Inside Fighters' League 1 on April 11, 2021.

=== Return to the UFC ===
Tavares was signed to UFC as a ringside doctor in 2025.

== Personal life ==
Tavares studied medicine at University Institute of Health Sciences - Héctor A. Barceló Foundation in Buenos Aires, Argentina.

== Accomplishments ==
- Ultimate Fighting Championships
  - Fight of the Night (Four times) vs. Tyson Griffin, Matt Wiman, Kurt Pellegrino and Brian Ortega
  - Submission of the Night (One time) vs. Jason Black
  - Performance of the Night (Two times) vs. Robbie Peralta and Clay Guida
  - UFC.com Awards
    - 2007: Ranked #7 Fight of the Year vs. Tyson Griffin
    - 2008: Ranked #2 Fight of the Year vs. Kurt Pellegrino & Ranked #3 Fight of the Year vs. Matt Wiman
    - 2015: Ranked #6 Fight of the Year vs. Brian Ortega
- It's Showtime MMA
  - 2006 It's Showtime MMA Title -70 kg
- Rumble of Amsterdam
  - 2006 Lightweight Grand Prix Champion
- MMAJunkie.com
  - 2015 June Fight of the Month vs. Brian Ortega

== Mixed martial arts record ==
Professional record breakdown
36 matches	24 wins	11 losses
By knockout	4	8
By submission	15	0
By decision	5	3
Draws	1	

Res.	Record	Opponent	Method	Event	Date	Round	Time	Location	Notes
Loss	24–11–1	Timur Nagibin	TKO (punches)	Russian Cagefighting Championship 9	May 3, 2021	3	0:50	Ekaterinburg, Russia	
Win	24–10–1	Jean Carlos Liebl	Submission (arm-triangle choke)	Gladiator CF 54	February 6, 2021	1	1:27	Curitiba, Paraná, Brazil	Featherweight bout.
Win	23–10–1	Laercio Alves dos Santos	TKO (punches)	Gladiator CF 53	October 24, 2020	1	3:38	Curitiba, Paraná, Brazil	
Loss	22–10–1	Rashid Magomedov	TKO (punches)	PFL 9	October 13, 2018	2	3:36	Long Beach, California, United States	2018 PFL Lightweight Semifinal bout.
Loss	22–9–1	Islam Mamedov	Decision (unanimous)	PFL 9	October 13, 2018	2	5:00	Long Beach, California, United States	2018 PFL Lightweight Quarterfinal bout.
Win	22–8–1	Arthur Estrázulas	Decision (split)	PFL 5	August 2, 2018	3	5:00	Uniondale, New York, United States	
Loss	21–8–1	Robert Watley	TKO (groin kick)	PFL 2	June 21, 2018	2	0:35	Chicago, Illinois, United States	Tavares was unable to continue after being kicked in the groin.
Win	21–7–1	Mauricio Machado	TKO (punches)	Aspera FC 49	February 18, 2017	1	0:46	Balneario Camboriu, Santa Catarina, Brazil	
Loss	20–7–1	Choi Doo-ho	KO (punches)	The Ultimate Fighter: Team Joanna vs. Team Cláudia Finale	July 8, 2016	1	2:42	Las Vegas, Nevada, United States	
Win	20–6–1	Clay Guida	Submission (guillotine choke)	UFC Fight Night: Belfort vs. Henderson 3	November 7, 2015	1	0:39	São Paulo, Brazil	Performance of the Night.
Loss	19–6–1	Brian Ortega	TKO (punches)	UFC Fight Night: Boetsch vs. Henderson	June 6, 2015	3	4:10	New Orleans, Louisiana, United States	Fight of the Night.
Win	19–5–1	Robbie Peralta	Submission (rear-naked choke)	UFC Fight Night: Bader vs. St. Preux	August 16, 2014	1	4:27	Bangor, Maine, United States	Featherweight debut. Performance of the Night.
Win	18–5–1	Justin Salas	Submission (rear-naked choke)	UFC Fight Night: Belfort vs. Henderson	November 9, 2013	1	2:38	Goiânia, Brazil	
Loss	17–5–1	Khabib Nurmagomedov	KO (punches and elbows)	UFC on FX: Belfort vs. Bisping	January 19, 2013	1	1:55	São Paulo, Brazil	Tavares tested positive for drostanolone.
Win	17–4–1	Sam Stout	Decision (unanimous)	UFC 142	January 14, 2012	3	5:00	Rio de Janeiro, Brazil	
Win	16–4–1	Spencer Fisher	TKO (punches)	UFC 134	August 27, 2011	2	2:51	Rio de Janeiro, Brazil	
Loss	15–4–1	Shane Roller	KO (punches)	UFC Live: Sanchez vs. Kampmann	March 3, 2011	2	1:28	Louisville, Kentucky, United States	
Win	15–3–1	Pat Audinwood	Submission (guillotine choke)	UFC 119	September 25, 2010	1	3:47	Indianapolis, Indiana, United States	
Draw	14–3–1	Nik Lentz	Draw (majority)	UFC Fight Night: Maynard vs. Diaz	January 11, 2010	3	5:00	Fairfax, Virginia, United States	Tavares was deducted 1 point due to a groin kick.
Win	14–3	Manvel Gamburyan	Decision (unanimous)	UFC 94	January 31, 2009	3	5:00	Las Vegas, Nevada, United States	
Loss	13–3	Kurt Pellegrino	Decision (unanimous)	UFC 88	September 6, 2008	3	5:00	Atlanta, Georgia, United States	Fight of the Night.
Loss	13–2	Matt Wiman	KO (punches)	UFC 85	June 7, 2008	2	1:57	London, England	Fight of the Night.
Win	13–1	Michihiro Omigawa	Decision (unanimous)	UFC Fight Night: Swick vs. Burkman	January 23, 2008	3	5:00	Las Vegas, Nevada, United States	
Loss	12–1	Tyson Griffin	Decision (unanimous)	UFC 76	September 22, 2007	3	5:00	Anaheim, California, United States	Fight of the Night.
Win	12–0	Jason Black	Submission (triangle choke)	UFC Fight Night: Stout vs. Fisher	June 12, 2007	2	2:49	Hollywood, Florida, United States	Submission of the Night.
Win	11–0	Naoyuki Kotani	Decision (unanimous)	UFC Fight Night: Stevenson vs. Guillard	April 5, 2007	3	5:00	Las Vegas, Nevada, United States	
Win	10–0	Marc Duncan	Submission (rear-naked choke)	It's Showtime 2006 Alkmaar	December 3, 2006	1	3:39	Alkmaar, Netherlands	Won the It's Showtime (70 kg) Championship.
Win	9–0	Ulas Aslan	TKO (punches)	2H2H: Pride & Honor	November 12, 2006	1	N/A	Rotterdam, Netherlands	
Win	8–0	Adriano Gonçalves	Submission (triangle choke)	Sul Fight Championship 1	September 16, 2006	2	4:12	Balneário Camboriú, Brazil	
Win	7–0	Romano de los Reyes	TKO (punches)	Rumble Of Amsterdam 3	May 21, 2006	2	1:24	Amsterdam, Netherlands	Won the Rumble of Amsterdam Lightweight Grand Prix.
Win	6–0	Mathieu Lawalata	Submission (heel hook)	Rumble Of Amsterdam 3	May 21, 2006	1	0:59	Amsterdam, Netherlands	
Win	5–0	Daniel Weichel	Submission (guillotine choke)	CWFC: Enter the Wolfslair	March 5, 2006	3	4:47	Liverpool, England	
Win	4–0	Marcio Cesar	Submission (rear-naked choke)	Storm Samurai 9	November 20, 2005	2	N/A	Curitiba, Brazil	
Win	3–0	Fabiano Adams	Submission (choke)	Extreme Combat	June 5, 2005	1	0:55	Joinville, Brazil	
Win	2–0	Johny Johny	Submission (triangle choke)	CO: Muay Thai & Vale Tudo	May 2, 2004	1	4:38	Curitiba, Brazil	
Win	1–0	James Jones	Submission (triangle choke)	Reality Fighting 5	November 1, 2003	2	1:18	Atlantic City, New Jersey, United States	

== See also ==
- List of current UFC fighters
- List of male mixed martial artists
