= Houston Alexander =

American mixed martial artist

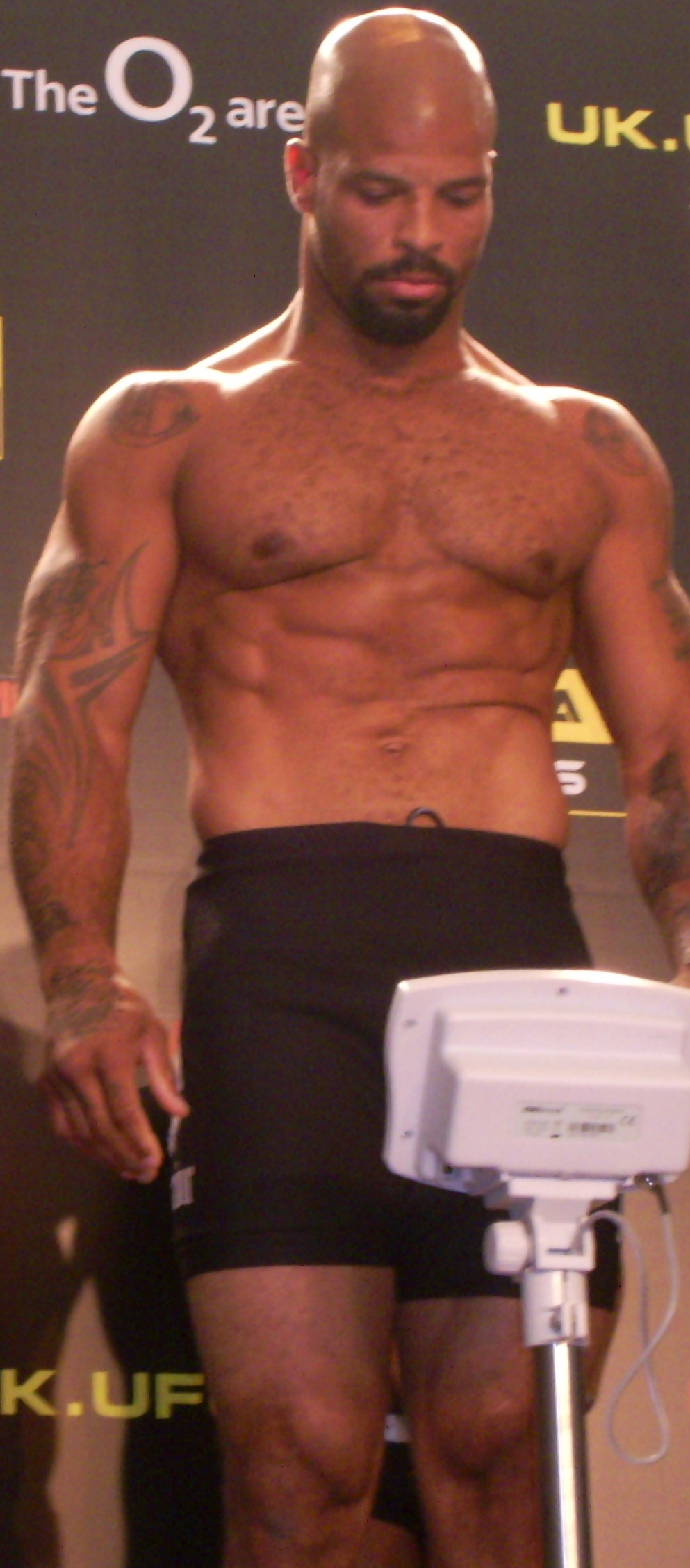
- Houston Alexander in 2007
- Born: March 22, 1972 (age 54); East St. Louis, Illinois, United States
- Other names: We Have A Problem
- Height: 6 ft 0 in (183 cm)
- Weight: 203 lb (92 kg; 14 st 7 lb)
- Division: Heavyweight; Light Heavyweight; Middleweight
- Reach: 72 in (183 cm)
- Stance: Orthodox
- Fighting out of: Omaha, Nebraska, United States
- Team: Grudge Training Center; Finney's HIT Squad
- Years active: 2001–2017 (MMA); 2021–present (Bare-knuckle boxing)

Mixed martial arts record
- Total: 36
- Wins: 17
- By knockout: 14
- By decision: 3
- Losses: 16
- By knockout: 10
- By submission: 2
- By decision: 4
- Draws: 1
- No contests: 2

Other information
- Mixed martial arts record from Sherdog

Houston Alexander (born March 22, 1972) is an American former professional mixed martial artist who last competed in 2017. A professional competitor since 2001, he has fought for the Ultimate Fighting Championship (UFC), Bellator MMA, Shark Fights, the Resurrection Fighting Alliance (RFA), and Konfrontacja Sztuk Walki (KSW). He currently competes in bare-knuckle boxing for Bare Knuckle Fighting Championship, where he is 4-0. As of July 25, 2024, he is tied at #5 in the BKFC men's pound-for-pound rankings.

== Background ==
Alexander was born in East St. Louis, Illinois, and lived there for the first eight years of his life. Growing up in a tight neighborhood, Alexander quickly learned how to defend himself before moving to Omaha, Nebraska. He was athletic growing up, and attended Omaha North High School, where he played football and wrestled, excelling in both and also started boxing when he was a teenager. He was accepted to the Savannah College of Art & Design in Georgia during his senior year of high school, but ultimately decided that he did not want to leave behind his daughter. Alexander then worked as a head machine operator grunt at an asphalt company, before turning to mixed martial arts.

== Mixed martial arts career ==
=== Ultimate Fighting Championship ===
Alexander made his UFC debut at UFC 71 on May 26, 2007, against Keith Jardine. He knocked out Jardine in 49 seconds during the first round in a huge upset.

As of 2007, he has since trained full-time; three times a day and seven days a week.

Alexander then signed a new three-fight contract with the UFC. At UFC 75 Alexander beat Italian Alessio Sakara. Just like his previous fight, Alexander was able to counter Sakara's early shots with close-contact strikes. "The way I was taught was that all your strength is inside versus outside,” Alexander said before the fight of his explosive ability when close to an opponent. "My short strikes are really, really good, and that’s from lifting weights and doing a lot of reps."

At UFC 78 Alexander faced then undefeated contender Thiago Silva. Silva won by TKO after the referee stopped the fight at 3:25 in the first round. In the fight Silva achieved mounted position on top of Alexander and landed punches until the referee called a stop to the contest.

On April 2, 2008, Alexander fought former WEC Heavyweight Champion James Irvin as the first fight on the televised portion of UFC Fight Night: Kenny Florian vs Joe Lauzon in Broomfield, Colorado. Irvin led off with a superman punch to the jaw that knocked Alexander down. He followed with three more devastating punches to the face that knocked Alexander unconscious at which point referee Steve Mazzagatti stopped the fight. Alexander immediately got to his feet and protested the quick stoppage. The eight-second knockout tied the record for the fastest knockout in the UFC alongside Don Frye's knockout at UFC 8. The loss was officially ruled as a TKO due to strikes, although some sources list it as a KO.

Alexander fought Eric "Red" Schafer at UFC Fight Night: Diaz vs. Neer in his hometown of Omaha, Nebraska. After landing some effective knees early in the fight, Alexander lost the fight via arm triangle submission in the first round.

Alexander was scheduled to face Andre Gusmão at UFC 98, but had to withdraw due to a broken hand suffered in training camp.

With the permission of the UFC, Alexander fought the late Sherman Pendergarst in a Heavyweight fight at Adrenaline MMA's Fourth Event. Alexander defeated Pendergarst by TKO due to leg kicks that dropped "The Tank" followed by punches on the ground.

Alexander made his return to the UFC at The Ultimate Fighter: Heavyweights Finale against internet superstar Kimbo Slice at a catchweight of 215 pounds. Alexander was defeated by Kimbo Slice by unanimous decision (29–28, 29–28, and 30–27) in a bout that many thought would not make it out of the first round. The fight was characterized by Alexander circling away from Kimbo while utilizing quick but not powerful leg kicks instead of directly engaging him. While the first and third rounds were largely spent at a distance, the most spectacular moment of the fight arguably came in the second round when Slice administered a suplex that rocked Alexander. Shortly following the loss, Alexander was cut from the UFC.

=== Independent promotions ===
Following his release from the UFC, Alexander then fought heavy-handed Joey Beltran at 5150 Combat League's "New Year's Revolution" on January 16, 2010, in Tulsa, Oklahoma. Alexander controlled the first round by using movement and using quick leg kicks to keep Beltran at bay, In the second round Alexander was utilizing the same tactics that had won him the first round but Beltran caught Alexander with an uppercut-left hook combination that dropped and finished Alexander at 3:49 in the 2nd round.

Alexander next faced Rameau Thierry Sokoudjou on September 11, 2010, at Shark Fights 13: Jardine vs. Prangley. Following a tough first round that saw Alexander rocked and knocked down on several occasions, he came back in the second round to win via TKO (punches) at 1:31, he won Knockout and Fight of the Night.

Alexander next was scheduled to fight a rematch against James Irvin from UFC Fight Night: Kenny Florian vs Joe Lauzon back in 2008, where Irvin knocked out Alexander 8 seconds into the 1st round via a superman punch. The 8-second knockout tied the record of fastest knockout in UFC history, until UFC 102, where Todd Duffee broke the record with a 7-second KO. It was set to take place at Shark Fights 14: Horwich vs. Villefort on March 11, 2011, in Lubbock, Texas. The fight was cancelled on March 2 due to a training injury suffered by Alexander and a failed drug test by Irvin.

Alexander faced Razak Al-Hassan at MMA Fight Pit: Genesis. He dominated and won the fight via TKO due to a doctor stoppage by a cut.

Alexander recently faced Canadian brawler Steve Bosse. He was knocked out in the 2nd round via a brutal elbow to the head from the clinch.

Alexander took on knockout-artist and longtime veteran Gilbert Yvel on Friday, March 30, 2012, at the second Resurrection Fighting Alliance (RFA) show. Houston lost via one punch KO in the first round.

On September 15, 2012, Alexander faced the KSW Light heavyweight Champion Jan Błachowicz at KSW 20 in Gdańsk, Poland. Błachowicz dominated Alexander on the ground for most of the fight, he lost via unanimous decision.

On March 30, 2013, Alexander defeated Dennis Reed via submission due to punches at Victory Fighting Championship 39.

On July 27, 2013, Alexander defeated Chuck Grigsby via Knockout in the fourth round at Victory Fighting Championship 40 to win the VFC Light heavyweight Championship.

=== Bellator MMA ===
Alexander faced former IFL Light heavyweight Champion and UFC veteran Vladimir Matyushenko on September 13, 2013, at Bellator 99 after Matyushenko's original opponent Christian M'Pumbu pulled out due to injury. He lost the fight via unanimous decision.

On April 18, 2014, Alexander faced Matt Uhde at Bellator 117. He won the fight via TKO due to doctor stoppage at the end of the second round.

Alexander was expected to face Pride FC veteran James Thompson on October 17, 2014, at Bellator 129 in a heavyweight bout. However, on October 10, 2014, it was announced that Thompson was pulled from the fight due to injury. Alexander instead faced Virgil Zwicker. The fight ended in a majority draw due to a point being deducted for repeated illegal headbutting.

A rematch with Zwicker took place at Bellator 132. Zwicker won the bout via split decision.

== Championships and accomplishments ==
- Shark Fights
  - Fight of the Night (One time)
  - Knockout of the Night (One time)
- Ultimate Fighting Championship
  - Knockout of the Night (One time)
  - UFC.com Awards
    - 2007: Ranked #3 Knockout of the Year vs. Keith Jardine, Ranked #5 Upset of the Year vs. Keith Jardine & Ranked #10 Knockout of the Year vs. Alessio Sakara
- Victory Fighting Championship
  - VFC Light heavyweight Championship (One time)

== Mixed martial arts record ==
Professional record breakdown
36 matches	17 wins	16 losses
By knockout	14	10
By submission	0	2
By decision	3	4
Draws	1	
No contests	2	

Res.	Record	Opponent	Method	Event	Date	Round	Time	Location	Notes
Loss	17–16–1 (2)	Rakim Cleveland	TKO (punches)	Primus FC: Cleveland vs. Alexander 2	December 9, 2017	3	3:04	Woodward, Oklahoma, United States	
Loss	17–15–1 (2)	Rakim Cleveland	TKO (knees and punches)	Extreme Challenge 234	April 15, 2017	1	4:45	Jefferson, Iowa, United States	
Win	17–14–1 (2)	Brian Green	Decision (unanimous)	MMA Fight Series: Alexander vs. Green	October 9, 2016	3	5:00	West Des Moines, Iowa, United States	
Loss	16–14–1 (2)	Evan Nedd	TKO (punches)	Redemption Fighting Championship 2	April 29, 2016	3	4:57	Oranjestad, Aruba	
Loss	16–13–1 (2)	Guilherme Viana	TKO (doctor stoppage)	Bellator 146	November 20, 2015	2	5:00	Thackerville, Oklahoma, United States	
Loss	16–12–1 (2)	Tony Lopez	TKO (punches)	Legend Fights: Lopez vs. Alexander	July 24, 2015	3	4:35	Shawnee, Oklahoma, United States	
Loss	16–11–1 (2)	Virgil Zwicker	Decision (split)	Bellator 132	January 16, 2015	3	5:00	Temecula, California, United States	Catchweight (215 lbs) bout.
Draw	16–10–1 (2)	Virgil Zwicker	Draw (majority)	Bellator 129	October 17, 2014	3	5:00	Council Bluffs, Iowa, United States	Alexander was deducted one point for headbutting.
Win	16–10 (2)	Matt Uhde	TKO (doctor stoppage)	Bellator 117	April 18, 2014	2	5:00	Council Bluffs, Iowa, United States	
Loss	15–10 (2)	Vladimir Matyushenko	Decision (unanimous)	Bellator 99	September 13, 2013	3	5:00	Temecula, California, United States	
Win	15–9 (2)	Chuck Grigsby	KO (punch)	Victory Fighting Championship 40	July 27, 2013	4	1:39	Ralston, Nebraska, United States	Won the VFC Light Heavyweight Championship.
Win	14–9 (2)	Dennis Reed	TKO (submission to punches)	Victory Fighting Championship 39	March 30, 2013	1	1:01	Ralston, Nebraska, United States	
Loss	13–9 (2)	Jan Błachowicz	Decision (unanimous)	KSW 20: Fighting Symphonies	September 15, 2012	3	5:00	Gdańsk, Poland	For the KSW Light Heavyweight Championship.
Loss	13–8 (2)	Gilbert Yvel	KO (punch)	RFA 2: Yvel vs. Alexander	March 30, 2012	1	3:59	Kearney, Nebraska, United States	
Loss	13–7 (2)	Steve Bossé	KO (elbow)	Instinct MMA 1	October 7, 2011	2	4:11	Montreal, Quebec, Canada	
Win	13–6 (2)	Razak Al-Hassan	TKO (doctor stoppage)	MMA Fight Pit: Genesis	August 13, 2011	2	5:00	Albuquerque, New Mexico, United States	
Win	12–6 (2)	Brian Albin	TKO (punches)	Caged In The Coliseum: Albin vs Alexander	June 25, 2011	3	0:26	Jackson, Mississippi, United States	
Win	11–6 (2)	Rameau Thierry Sokoudjou	TKO (punches)	Shark Fights 13: Jardine vs Prangley	September 11, 2010	2	1:31	Amarillo, Texas, United States	Fight of the Night. Knockout of the Night.
Win	10–6 (2)	David Griffin	Decision (unanimous)	UFA 1: The Clash at the Coliseum	June 11, 2010	3	5:00	Charleston, South Carolina, United States	
NC	9–6 (2)	Justin Grizzard	NC (eye poke)	Extreme Challenge: The Aftermath	March 27, 2010	2	N/A	Council Bluffs, Iowa, United States	Alexander landed an accidental eye poke which rendered Grizzard unable to continue.
Loss	9–6 (1)	Joey Beltran	TKO (punches)	5150 Combat League/XFL: New Year's Revolution	January 16, 2010	2	3:49	Tulsa, Oklahoma, United States	For the 5150 Combat League Heavyweight Championship.
Loss	9–5 (1)	Kimbo Slice	Decision (unanimous)	The Ultimate Fighter: Heavyweights Finale	December 5, 2009	3	5:00	Las Vegas, Nevada, United States	Catchweight (215 lbs) bout.
Win	9–4 (1)	Sherman Pendergarst	TKO (leg kicks and punches)	Adrenaline MMA IV: Sylvia vs. Riley	September 18, 2009	1	1:51	Council Bluffs, Iowa, United States	Heavyweight bout.
Loss	8–4 (1)	Eric Schafer	Submission (arm-triangle choke)	UFC Fight Night: Diaz vs. Neer	September 17, 2008	1	4:53	Omaha, Nebraska, United States	
Loss	8–3 (1)	James Irvin	KO (superman punch)	UFC Fight Night 13	April 2, 2008	1	0:08	Broomfield, Colorado, United States	
Loss	8–2 (1)	Thiago Silva	TKO (punches)	UFC 78	November 17, 2007	1	3:25	Newark, New Jersey, United States	
Win	8–1 (1)	Alessio Sakara	TKO (knee and punches)	UFC 75	September 8, 2007	1	1:01	London, England, United Kingdom	Knockout of the Night.
Win	7–1 (1)	Keith Jardine	KO (punches)	UFC 71	May 26, 2007	1	0:48	Las Vegas, Nevada, United States	Light Heavyweight debut.
NC	6–1 (1)	Todd Allee	NC (illegal knees)	Extreme Challenge 76	March 31, 2007	1	3:23	Sloan, Iowa, United States	Alexander delivered knees to Allee who was a grounded opponent.
Win	6–1	Jon Murphy	TKO (punches)	Extreme Challenge 76	March 31, 2007	1	0:56	Sloan, Iowa, United States	
Win	5–1	Demian Decorah	Decision (unanimous)	Downtown Destruction 1	January 12, 2005	5	3:00	Des Moines, Iowa, United States	
Win	4–1	Brandon Quigley	TKO (punches)	Judgment Night 2	November 3, 2004	1	0:41	Des Moines, Iowa, United States	Heavyweight debut.
Win	3–1	Justin Butler	KO (punches)	Gladiators 20	March 15, 2003	1	0:38	Des Moines, Iowa, United States	
Win	2–1	Chuck Purdow	TKO (submission to punches)	Gladiators 17	August 18, 2001	1	0:58	Hastings, Nebraska, United States	
Win	1–1	Jamie Webb	TKO (submission to punches)	Gladiators 16	June 30, 2001	1	2:18	Des Moines, Iowa, United States	
Loss	0–1	Jason Medina	Submission (arm-triangle choke)	Extreme Challenge 40	June 16, 2001	2	0:47	Springfield, Illinois, United States	

== Bare-knuckle boxing record ==
Professional record breakdown
4 matches	4 wins	0 losses
By knockout	3	0
By decision	1	0

Res.	Record	Opponent	Method	Event	Date	Round	Time	Location	Notes
Win	4–0	Jeremy Smith	Decision (unanimous)	BKFC 43	May 19, 2023	5	2:00	Omaha, Nebraska, United States	
Win	3–0	Joey Beltran	KO (punches)	BKFC 33	November 18, 2022	2	0:38	Omaha, Nebraska, United States	
Win	2–0	Jay Fish	TKO (punches)	BKFC Fight Night Omaha: Cochrane vs. Dyer	May 13, 2022	1	1:41	Omaha, Nebraska, United States	
Win	1–0	Wes Combs	KO (punch)	BKFC 21	September 10, 2021	1	0:34	Omaha, Nebraska, United States	

== Television ==
Alexander made an appearance on the Fox Sports Network's "Sport Science" in 2009.

== Music career ==
Alexander, also known as "Scrib", "Cone-Dome", or "FAS/ONE", has long been a bastion of Omaha's underground hip hop scene. In the 1980s he led a hip hop movement in North Omaha called the Scribble Crew as an alliance of graffiti writers who developed a reputation as the top tag artists in the area. The art stands today at 24th and Binney Streets and 16th and Corby Streets among other North Omaha locations, and is still respected by the community. His Midwest Alliance act was active through the 1990s and into the new millennium, and is seen as influential on the Omaha scene.

Today Alexander is a DJ on KOPW 106.9, a local radio station in Omaha. He hosts an independent music show featuring hip hop and facilitates an elementary school program called the "Culture Shock School Tour" which teaches students about hip hop. Alexander has also been vocal about Omaha's lack of support for its hip hop artists.

== Personal life ==
According to public records, Alexander has 9 kids with 8 different women. Alexander donated one of his kidneys to his oldest daughter in 2000. He frequently dates around his current city of Omaha, NE. Not regularly seen with family - immediate or extended family members are unknown at this time.

== See also ==
- List of Bellator MMA alumni
- List of male mixed martial artists
- Hip hop in Omaha
