= UFC Fight Night: Evans vs. Salmon =

UFC mixed martial arts event in 2007

- The poster for UFC Fight Night: Evans vs. Salmon
- Promotion: Ultimate Fighting Championship
- Date: January 25, 2007
- Venue: Seminole Hard Rock Hotel and Casino
- City: Hollywood, Florida

Event chronology
| UFC 66: Liddell vs. Ortiz | UFC Fight Night: Evans vs. Salmon | UFC 67: All or Nothing |

UFC Fight Night: Evans vs. Salmon (also known as UFC Fight Night 8) was a mixed martial arts event held by the Ultimate Fighting Championship on January 25, 2007 at the Seminole Hard Rock Hotel and Casino in Hollywood, Florida. It was broadcast live in the United States and Canada on Spike TV.

== Background ==
This card featured the UFC debut of PRIDE and Hero's veteran Heath Herring. Originally scheduled for the main card was a bout between middleweight contestants Nate Marquardt and Dean Lister; it is believed that Spike TV influenced the eventual decision to remove the bout from the main card.

== Results ==
Main Card
| Weight class | | | | Method | Round | Time | Notes |
|---|---|---|---|---|---|---|---|
| Light Heavyweight | Rashad Evans | def. | Sean Salmon | KO (head kick) | 2 | 1:06 |
| Heavyweight | Jake O'Brien | def. | Heath Herring | Decision (unanimous) (29–28, 30–27, 30–27) | 3 | 5:00 |
| Lightweight | Hermes França | def. | Spencer Fisher | TKO (punches) | 2 | 4:03 |
Preliminary card
| Middleweight | Nate Marquardt | def. | Dean Lister | Decision (unanimous) (30–27, 30–25, 30–25) | 3 | 5:00 |
| Welterweight | Josh Burkman | def. | Chad Reiner | Decision (unanimous) (29–28, 29–28, 30–27) | 3 | 5:00 |
| Middleweight | Ed Herman | def. | Chris Price | Submission (armbar) | 1 | 2:58 | (Note: This preliminary bout was aired on the broadcast after the Herring vs. O'Brien bout.) |
| Lightweight | Din Thomas | def. | Clay Guida | Decision (unanimous) (29–28, 29–28, 29–28) | 3 | 5:00 |
| Welterweight | Rich Clementi | def. | Ross Pointon | Submission (rear-naked choke) | 2 | 4:53 |

== Bonus awards ==
The following fighters received bonuses.

- Fight of the Night: Spencer Fisher vs. Hermes Franca
- Knockout of the Night: Rashad Evans
- Submission of the Night: Ed Herman

== Official salaries ==
The following figures are based on the fighter salary information that the UFC is required by law to submit to the state athletic commissions, including the winners' bonuses.

| Fighter | Payout |
|---|---|
| Rashad Evans | $24,000 |
| Sean Salmon | $3,000 |
| Jake O’Brien | $18,000 |
| Heath Herring | $60,000 |
| Hermes Franca | $24,000 |
| Spencer Fisher | $13,000 |
| Nate Marquardt | $44,000 |
| Dean Lister | $11,000 |
| Josh Burkman | $14,000 |
| Chad Reiner | $3,000 |
| Ed Herman | $24,000 |
| Chris Price | $3,000 |
| Din Thomas | $24,000 |
| Clay Guida | $5,000 |
| Rich Clementi | $20,000 |
| Ross Pointon | $5,000 |

== See also ==
- Ultimate Fighting Championship
- List of UFC champions
- List of UFC events
- 2007 in UFC
