= UFC Fight Night: Thomas vs. Florian =

UFC mixed martial arts event in 2007

- The poster for UFC Fight Night: Thomas vs. Florian
- Promotion: Ultimate Fighting Championship
- Date: September 19, 2007
- Venue: Palms Casino Resort
- City: Las Vegas, Nevada
- Total gate: $270,000

Event chronology
UFC 75: Champion vs. Champion	UFC Fight Night: Thomas vs. Florian	UFC 76: Knockout

UFC Fight Night: Thomas vs. Florian (also known as UFC Fight Night 11) was a mixed martial arts (MMA) event held by the Ultimate Fighting Championship (UFC) on Wednesday, September 19, 2007, at the Palms Casino Resort in Las Vegas, Nevada. It was broadcast live in the United States and Canada on Spike TV as a lead-in to the debut of The Ultimate Fighter 6.

== Background ==
The main event was originally expected to be a rematch between The Ultimate Fighter 1 contestants Chris Leben and Mike Swick. Leben, however, chose to decline the fight offer (Leben later claimed that his managers turned down the fight without his knowledge on an Ultimate Fighter 1 reunion episode). Swick was to be featured on the main card in a match against Canadian fighter Jonathan Goulet, who confirmed the bout on July 18 to The Fight Network. Reports indicate that veteran UFC fighter Chris Lytle was also considered for the bout. However, Swick pulled out of the bout on September 2, 2007 due to a rib injury. Goulet faced Dustin Hazelett instead.

The card was rescheduled to feature a lightweight main event bout between Din Thomas and Spencer Fisher. However, on August 7, Fisher announced via his MySpace page that he was withdrawing from the event due to a staph infection in his knee. Former title challenger Kenny Florian replaced Fisher in the main event.

Chris Leben remained on the fight card; he appeared in a middleweight match with Terry Martin. Nate Quarry, the first cast member of The Ultimate Fighter reality series to challenge for a UFC championship, also returned to the UFC after nearly a two-year layoff following his match against Rich Franklin at UFC 56.

== Results ==
Main card
Weight class				Method	Round	Time	Notes
Lightweight	Kenny Florian	def.	Din Thomas	Submission (rear-naked choke)	1	4:31
Middleweight	Chris Leben	def.	Terry Martin	KO (punch)	3	3:56	(Note: Leben was docked 1 point in round 1 for grabbing the cage.)
Lightweight	Nate Diaz	def.	Junior Assuncao	Submission (guillotine choke)	1	4:10
Middleweight	Nate Quarry	def.	Pete Sell	KO (punch)	3	0:44
Preliminary card
Welterweight	Dustin Hazelett	def.	Jonathan Goulet	Submission (armbar)	1	1:14
Welterweight	Thiago Alves	def.	Kuniyoshi Hironaka	TKO (punch and knee)	2	4:04
Lightweight	Cole Miller	def.	Leonard Garcia	Decision (unanimous) (30–27, 29–28, 30–27)	3	5:00
Welterweight	Luke Cummo	def.	Edilberto de Oliveira	TKO (punches)	1	1:45
Lightweight	Gray Maynard	def.	Joe Veres	KO (punch)	1	0:09

== Bonus awards ==
The following fighters received $40,000 bonuses.

- Fight of the Night: Cole Miller vs. Leonard Garcia
- Knockout of the Night: Chris Leben
- Submission of the Night: Dustin Hazelett

== See also ==
- Ultimate Fighting Championship
- List of UFC champions
- List of UFC events
- 2007 in UFC
