= Roger Huerta =

American mixed martial arts fighter

- Born: May 20, 1983 (age 43); Los Angeles, California, U.S.
- Other names: El Matador
- Height: 5 ft 9 in (1.75 m)
- Weight: 170 lb (77 kg; 12 st)
- Division: Lightweight (2003–2010, 2016–present); Welterweight (2011–2016)
- Reach: 70 in (178 cm)
- Fighting out of: Austin, Texas
- Rank: Black belt in Brazilian jiu-jitsu
- Wrestling: NCAA Division III Wrestling
- Years active: 2003–present

Mixed martial arts record
- Total: 40
- Wins: 24
- By knockout: 12
- By submission: 5
- By decision: 5
- By disqualification: 2
- Losses: 14
- By knockout: 7
- By submission: 1
- By decision: 6
- Draws: 1
- No contests: 1

Amateur record
- Total: 5
- Wins: 5
- By knockout: 3
- By submission: 2

Other information
- Mixed martial arts record from Sherdog

Roger Huerta (born May 20, 1983) is an American mixed martial artist currently fighting in the lightweight division. He initially gained exposure by competing in the lightweight division of the Ultimate Fighting Championship (UFC), Bellator Fighting Championships and later ONE Championship. The adversity of his childhood and early years, including his parents leaving him in two foreign countries, once during the Salvadoran Civil War, have been the subject of several publications.

== Early life ==
Huerta had an arduous childhood with life continuing to be difficult throughout his teen years. Despite adversity, he has overcome many challenges, ultimately living what has been described as a "life that Hollywood producers make movies about".

Born in Los Angeles, California on May 20, 1983 to Lydia, a Salvadoran, and Rogelio Huerta, a Mexican, he spent the first six years of his life in Dallas, Texas. He had a happy childhood until his father became heavily involved in drugs and alcohol and began an affair with another woman that led to a separation with Lydia.

Huerta's mother became physically abusive following her separation from Rogelio, and when Huerta came to school with bruises covering his body, Child Protective Services intervened, placing him in a foster home for a short time. In 1990, Lydia lost the custody battle for Huerta and fled the United States with Huerta, age 7, to her parents' home in El Salvador. Shortly upon arriving, Lydia abandoned Huerta leaving him in the care of his grandparents at the time of the Salvadoran Civil War. She returned a year later only to leave him on his father's doorstep in Texas. That was the last time he saw his mother. Huerta openly talks about the mental and physical abuse he endured from his father and stepmother respectively in that year. The next year he was relocated to Mexico after his father caught his stepmother physically abusing him and lived with his father's parents who were impoverished. They would often send him out into the streets selling picture frames to tourists to make money. For a brief time, his father and stepmother came back into his life where they moved to Pharr, Texas and enrolled him halfway through the year into 3rd grade, in addition to his stepmother resuming the cycle of abuse. At age 12 Huerta's father abandoned the family, and soon after, his stepmother kicked him out of the house. He then lived on the streets for many years and survived by joining a youth gang. He often slept in alleys and on rooftops, but was encouraged by his friends to remain in school where he could eat a provided breakfast and lunch.

Huerta occasionally stayed with friends and just before his freshman year, his life began to turn around for the better. Maria King, his friend's mother, obtained legal custody of him and the three moved to Austin, Texas where he attended David Crockett High School. For one of the first times in his life he found himself in a stable environment and became quite popular in school and joined many of the school's sports teams including football and wrestling. It was there he met Jo Ramirez, his English teacher, who learned about his troubled childhood in a conversation discussing his future ambitions. Furthermore, Bryan Ashford, the school's wrestling coach, took a special interest in Huerta and continued to support him in division wrestling. Ramirez, already a mother of seven, adopted Huerta in 2002 at the age of 19. Ashford coached Huerta and with the help of Ramirez, aided him in applying for a collegiate wrestling scholarship. Huerta attended and graduated from Augsburg University based in Minneapolis, Minnesota with a bachelor's degree in business management, and at one point, resided in St. Paul, Minnesota.

Huerta worked for a time as a bouncer and construction worker.

== Career ==
In Huerta's pre-UFC career, his first loss came as a result of a dislocated jaw early in the finals of the SuperBrawl 36 tournament against Ryan Schultz on June 18, 2004, his third match of the day.

=== Ultimate Fighting Championship ===
Huerta was originally slated to make his UFC debut against Hermes Franca at UFC 61, but was forced to withdraw from the fight as the result of an elbow injury. He won his first six fights in the UFC, the first at UFC 63 against Jason Dent, which was declared Fight of the Night.

His next fight was against UFC newcomer John Halverson at UFC 67. The fight ended by TKO after 19 seconds of round one after Huerta landed a knee to the shoulder/head area of a grounded Halverson, knocking him down and finishing him with punches. The end of the bout was controversial as knees to the head of grounded opponents are illegal under UFC rules. It was later shown in a replay that Huerta's knee was actually to the shoulder rather than to the head.

Next he fought in a three-round war with Leonard Garcia at UFC 69. winning via unanimous decision. This fight earned him another Fight of the Night award. After the fight, in May 2007, Huerta became the first mixed martial artist to appear on the cover of Sports Illustrated Magazine, for a story on the rising popularity of mixed martial arts.

Huerta won his next two fights against Doug Evans and Alberto Crane. He then faced Clay Guida in the 2007's The Ultimate Fighter 6 Finale. Huerta was visibly frustrated at losing in the grappling exchanges from Guida's wrestling offensive, spending a large part of the bout on his back fending off "ground and pound" from his opponent. Late in the second round, Huerta was stunned by a punch to the face while trying to get to his feet, but managed to survive until the end of the round. Early in the third round, Huerta looked to engage Guida on his feet, connecting with a knee to the face while attempting a kick Guida. After a brief flurry, Huerta took his back and submitted Guida by rear naked choke very late in the fight for an impressive come-from-behind win. This fight earned him another Fight of the Night award.

Huerta then lost his next fight by unanimous decision at UFC 87 against Kenny Florian.On January 9, 2009, Huerta announced an indefinite hiatus from MMA to further pursue opportunities in acting. In order to complete his UFC contract, Huerta returned on September 16, 2009, but lost to Gray Maynard at UFC Fight Night 19. After a back-and-forth fight, he would end up losing a split decision in his bout against Maynard.

=== Bellator Fighting Championships ===
Despite having previously announced on his personal Twitter account that he was in talks with Strikeforce, Huerta eventually signed with Bellator Fighting Championships. He was one of eight men to compete in the second season lightweight tournament, with the winner receiving a title shot against Eddie Alvarez.

His first fight in the tournament took place at Bellator 13. Huerta defeated opponent Chad Hinton via submission (kneebar) at 0:56 of the third round.

His second fight in the tournament took place at Bellator 17. Huerta lost the semi-final to Pat Curran by a controversial unanimous decision (29-28 from all three judges).

However, on August 12 it was announced that Huerta would be fighting Bellator Lightweight Champion Eddie Alvarez, after Curran had to pull out of the fight due to a slap tear in his right shoulder. The Lightweight belt was not on the line when the two met on October 21, 2010 at Bellator 33 in Philadelphia. He lost the fight via doctor stoppage at the end of the 2nd round.

=== Post-Bellator ===
Huerta fought against War Machine in a welterweight bout in the main event of Ultimate Warrior Fighting 1. Huerta lost the fight via TKO after he suffered a fractured rib during the final scramble in the third round where he rolled out of War Machine's submission armbar attempts to claim side control. From there, War Machine escaped from Huerta's side mount to directly take full mount with ease. Machine then rained down punches for the referee stoppage at three minutes and nine seconds.

=== ONE Championship ===
Huerta signed with the Asian-based promotion ONE Championship in 2012. He was scheduled to fight Phil Baroni in a welterweight bout at ONE FC: Destiny of Warriors on June 23 but Baroni was pulled from the fight after suffering a TKO loss in a fight 3 weeks before the event. Huerta instead fought Zorobabel Moreira at the event, and was defeated via KO (soccer kick) in the second round.

After two years away from the sport, Huerta returned to One FC on August 29, 2014. He faced undefeated Christian Holley at ONE FC: Reign of Champions and won the fight via TKO in the first round.

=== Bellator return ===
After seven-and-a-half years away from the promotion, Huerta re-signed with Bellator MMA for one fight in 2018. He faced Benson Henderson in the main event at Bellator 196 on April 6, 2018. Huerta lost the bout via submission in the second round.

Subsequently, in May 2018, Huerta signed a new, multi-fight contract with Bellator.

Huerta faced Patricky Freire on September 21, 2018 at Bellator 205. He lost the fight via knockout in the second round.

Huerta faced Sidney Outlaw at Bellator 234 on November 14, 2019. He lost the fight via unanimous decision.

Huerta faced Chris Gonzalez at Bellator 255 on April 2, 2021. He lost the bout after tapping due to strikes in the third round.

On April 19, 2021, it was announced that Huerta was released by Bellator.

=== Professional Fighters League ===
Huerta would next fight fellow UFC veteran Robert Whiteford at PFL Europe 3 on September 28, 2024. He would lose the fight via unanimous decision.

== Training ==
Huerta trained for his UFC fight against Kenny Florian with Greg Jackson's Submission Fighting. For his Bellator debut, he spent time in Thailand and put together a training camp with MMA fighters such as Yves Edwards (UFC), Shad Lierley (Bellator), Jared Hess (Bellator), Dave Menne, and Jeff Clark out of the Phil Cardella / Relson Gracie Academy in Austin, Texas.

== Film ==
Huerta made his acting debut as Miguel Caballero Rojo in the live action motion picture Tekken. He also starred alongside Kimbo Slice, Frank Mir, and Heath Herring in Circle of Pain, a 2010 direct-to-video film.

== Personal life ==
Huerta previously dated actress Laura Prepon from 2008 to 2009.

In August 2010, Huerta engaged in a street fight outside of a bar at approximately 2 A.M. CST in Austin, Texas. Video footage provided by TMZ shows a man alleged to be Huerta is seen exchanging words with and defending himself against a man, Rashad Bobino, a former Texas Longhorns linebacker, who had just assaulted a woman.

== Championships and accomplishments ==
- Ultimate Fighting Championship
  - Fight of the Night (Three times) vs. Jason Dent, Leonard Garcia and Clay Guida
  - Tied (Neil Magny & Kevin Holland) for most wins in a calendar year (5)
  - UFC.com Awards
    - 2007: Fight of the Year vs. Clay Guida, Ranked #3 Submission of the Year vs. Clay Guida, Ranked #8 Fight of the Year vs. Leonard Garcia & Ranked #8 Fighter of the Year
- International Sport Karate Association
  - ISKA MMA Welterweight Championship (One time)
- International Fighting Championship
  - IFC World Lightweight Championship (One time)
- FIGHT! Magazine
  - 2007 Fight of the Year vs. Clay Guida at The Ultimate Fighter 6 Finale

== Mixed martial arts record ==
Professional record breakdown
40 matches	24 wins	14 losses
By knockout	12	7
By submission	5	1
By decision	5	6
By disqualification	2	0
Draws	1	
No contests	1	

Res.	Record	Opponent	Method	Event	Date	Round	Time	Location	Notes
Loss	24–14–1 (1)	Rob Whiteford	Decision (unanimous)	PFL Europe 3 (2024)	September 28, 2024	3	5:00	Glasgow, Scotland	Catchweight (150 lb) bout.
Loss	24–13–1 (1)	Chris Gonzalez	TKO (submission to punches)	Bellator 255	April 2, 2021	3	3:01	Uncasville, Connecticut, United States	Catchweight (160 lb) bout.
Loss	24–12–1 (1)	Sidney Outlaw	Decision (unanimous)	Bellator 234	November 14, 2019	3	5:00	Tel Aviv, Israel	
Loss	24–11–1 (1)	Patricky Pitbull	KO (punch)	Bellator 205	September 21, 2018	2	0:43	Boise, Idaho, United States	
Loss	24–10–1 (1)	Benson Henderson	Submission (guillotine choke)	Bellator 196	April 6, 2018	2	0:49	Budapest, Hungary	
Win	24–9–1 (1)	Hayder Hassan	DQ (elbows to back of head)	Phoenix FC 4	December 22, 2017	2	0:55	Dubai, United Arab Emirates	Welterweight bout. An illegal elbow to the back of the head rendered Huerta unable to continue.
Win	23–9–1 (1)	Adrian Pang	Decision (split)	ONE: Defending Honor	November 11, 2016	3	5:00	Kallang, Singapore	
Loss	22–9–1 (1)	Ariel Sexton	TKO (submission to punches)	ONE: Dynasty of Champions 6	July 2, 2016	3	3:53	Anhui, China	
Loss	22–8–1 (1)	Koji Ando	Decision (unanimous)	ONE: Odyssey of Champions	September 27, 2015	3	5:00	Jakarta, Indonesia	
Win	22–7–1 (1)	Christian Holley	TKO (knees and punches)	ONE FC: Reign of Champions	August 29, 2014	1	3:13	Dubai, United Arab Emirates	Return to Lightweight.
Loss	21–7–1 (1)	Zorobabel Moreira	KO (soccer kick)	ONE FC: Destiny of Warriors	June 23, 2012	2	3:53	Kuala Lumpur, Malaysia	
Loss	21–6–1 (1)	War Machine	TKO (punches)	Ultimate Warrior Fighting 1	November 26, 2011	3	3:09	Pharr, Texas, United States	Return to Welterweight.
Loss	21–5–1 (1)	Eddie Alvarez	TKO (doctor stoppage)	Bellator 33	October 21, 2010	2	5:00	Philadelphia, Pennsylvania, United States	Non-title bout.
Loss	21–4–1 (1)	Pat Curran	Decision (unanimous)	Bellator 17	May 6, 2010	3	5:00	Boston, Massachusetts, United States	Bellator Season 2 Lightweight Tournament Semifinal.
Win	21–3–1 (1)	Chad Hinton	Submission (kneebar)	Bellator 13	April 8, 2010	3	0:56	Hollywood, Florida, United States	Bellator Season 2 Lightweight Tournament Quarterfinal.
Loss	20–3–1 (1)	Gray Maynard	Decision (split)	UFC Fight Night: Diaz vs. Guillard	September 16, 2009	3	5:00	Oklahoma City, Oklahoma, United States	
Loss	20–2–1 (1)	Kenny Florian	Decision (unanimous)	UFC 87	August 9, 2008	3	5:00	Minneapolis, Minnesota, United States	
Win	20–1–1 (1)	Clay Guida	Submission (rear-naked choke)	The Ultimate Fighter 6 Finale	December 8, 2007	3	0:51	Las Vegas, Nevada, United States	Fight of the Night. Fight of the Year (2007). Tied UFC record for most wins in a calendar year (5).
Win	19–1–1 (1)	Alberto Crane	TKO (punches)	UFC 74	August 25, 2007	3	1:50	Las Vegas, Nevada, United States	
Win	18–1–1 (1)	Doug Evans	TKO (punches)	The Ultimate Fighter 5 Finale	June 23, 2007	2	3:30	Las Vegas, Nevada, United States	
Win	17–1–1 (1)	Leonard Garcia	Decision (unanimous)	UFC 69	April 7, 2007	3	5:00	Houston, Texas, United States	Fight of the Night.
Win	16–1–1 (1)	John Halverson	TKO (punches)	UFC 67	February 3, 2007	1	0:19	Las Vegas, Nevada, United States	
Win	15–1–1 (1)	Jason Dent	Decision (unanimous)	UFC 63	September 23, 2006	3	5:00	Anaheim, California, United States	Fight of the Night.
Win	14–1–1 (1)	Joe Camacho	TKO (punches)	Raze MMA: Fight Night	April 29, 2006	2	2:43	San Diego, California, United States	
Win	13–1–1 (1)	Dan Swift	TKO (punches)	Extreme Challenge 66	February 17, 2006	2	0:51	Medina, Minnesota, United States	
Win	12–1–1 (1)	Lee King	Submission (rear-naked choke)	IFC: Rumble on the Rio 2	October 15, 2005	1	0:50	Texas, United States	Won the vacant IFC World Lightweight Championship.
Win	11–1–1 (1)	Matt Wiman	Decision (unanimous)	Freestyle FC 15	September 14, 2005	3	5:00	Medina, Minnesota, United States	Return to Lightweight.
Win	10–1–1 (1)	Brad Blackburn	TKO (corner stoppage)	IFC: Rock N' Rumble	July 30, 2005	3	2:19	Texas, United States	Welterweight debut. Won the vacant ISKA MMA Welterweight Championship.
NC	9–1–1 (1)	Melvin Guillard	NC (result overturned by commission)	Freestyle FC 14	March 5, 2005	3	5:00	Biloxi, Mississippi, United States	Originally a decision win for Guillard; overturned due to Guillard greasing between rounds.
Win	9–1–1	Kenny Jerrell	TKO (punches)	Freestyle FC 14	March 5, 2005	1	2:15	Biloxi, Mississippi, United States	
Win	8–1–1	Steve Kinnison	Submission (rear-naked choke)	Freestyle FC 14	March 5, 2005	2	2:57	Biloxi, Mississippi, United States	
Win	7–1–1	Naoyuki Kotani	TKO (punches)	XFO 4	December 3, 2004	1	1:29	Lakemoor, Illinois, United States	
Win	6–1–1	Jake Short	Submission (rear-naked choke)	Extreme Challenge 60	November 12, 2004	3	0:37	Medina, Minnesota, United States	
Win	5–1–1	Matt Brady	TKO (punches)	Extreme Challenge 59	September 24, 2004	1	3:12	Medina, Minnesota, United States	
Loss	4–1–1	Ryan Schultz	TKO (jaw injury)	SuperBrawl 36	June 18, 2004	1	1:47	Honolulu, Hawaii, United States	Superbrawl Lightweight Tournament Final.
Win	4–0–1	Mike Aina	Decision (split)	SuperBrawl 36	June 18, 2004	3	3:00	Honolulu, Hawaii, United States	Superbrawl Lightweight Tournament Semifinal.
Win	3–0–1	Harris Sarmiento	TKO (punches)	SuperBrawl 36	June 18, 2004	3	2:12	Honolulu, Hawaii, United States	Superbrawl Lightweight Tournament Quarterfinal.
Draw	2–0–1	Joe Jordan	Draw	Extreme Challenge 56	March 26, 2004	3	3:00	Medina, Minnesota, United States	
Win	2–0	Jeff Carlson	DQ (headbutt)	Best of the Best 2	August 2, 2003	2	4:52	Anoka, Minnesota, United States	
Win	1–0	Shane Lavafor	TKO (punches)	Best of the Best 2	August 2, 2003	1	2:12	Anoka, Minnesota, United States	Lightweight debut.

== See also ==
- List of ONE Championship alumni
