= Sean Salmon =

American mixed martial arts fighter (born 1977)

- Born: September 11, 1977 (age 49); Milwaukee, Wisconsin, U.S.
- Height: 5 ft 10 in (1.78 m)
- Weight: 205 lb (93 kg; 14.6 st)
- Division: Light Heavyweight; Middleweight
- Stance: Southpaw
- Fighting out of: Columbus, Ohio, U.S.
- Team: The JG MMA And Fitness (2005–2009, 2011–2014); Wolfslair MMA Academy (2009–2011)
- Trainer: Jorge Gurgel; Mario Neto (2009–2011)
- Years active: 2005–2013

Mixed martial arts record
- Total: 39
- Wins: 18
- By knockout: 5
- By submission: 8
- By decision: 5
- Losses: 21
- By knockout: 10
- By submission: 11

Other information
- Mixed martial arts record from Sherdog

Sean Salmon (born September 11, 1977) is an American retired mixed martial artist and a former columnist for MMA news site MMAjunkie.com. Salmon has competed for the UFC, Strikeforce and King of the Cage.

== Background ==
Salmon was born in Milwaukee, Wisconsin. He began his high school wrestling career for Birmingham Groves High School in Birmingham, Michigan. As a freshman, he competed at the varsity level and held a record of 20–20 in the 160 lb. weight class. In his sophomore season, he held a record 38–9 in the same weight class, and qualified for the state meet before moving to Ohio to finish high school. Salmon continued competing for Worthington Kilbourne High School, where he won a state championship in his senior season and amassed a 44–1 record.

Salmon then went on to compete for Ohio State University and was ranked as high as #10 in the nation for the 167 lb. weight class as a freshman. Competing in the 184 lb. weight class for OSU, he was the Michigan State Open Champion and holds a notable win over WWE and Bellator MMA star Bobby Lashley. However, the weight-cutting was too harsh for Salmon, and he left after his sophomore year but would return as a volunteer assistant coach to continue training. Salmon continued his career in amateur wrestling and also qualified for the Olympic trials while competing at the Ohio International Wrestling Club in the freestyle wrestling circuit.

== Mixed martial arts career ==
=== Early career ===
Salmon made his professional mixed martial arts debut in 2005 in Columbus, Ohio and won via keylock submission in the first round. He would go on to reach an undefeated record of 6–0, competing in smaller American promotions such as King of the Cage, before being handed his first professional loss by future UFC veteran David Heath. He compiled a record of 9–1 with only one win by way of decision before being invited to compete in the UFC.

=== UFC career ===
Salmon made his UFC debut in the main event of UFC Fight Night 8 on January 25, 2007. In a nationally televised fight against Rashad Evans, the Heavyweight winner of The Ultimate Fighter 2, Salmon lost due to knockout from a head kick at 1:06 in the second round. The knockout was so brutal that he was carried out of the octagon on a stretcher.

Salmon was then scheduled to fight Eric Schafer at UFC 71 on May 26, 2007, but he instead faced Alan Belcher after Schafer broke a rib during training. In the preliminary fight, Salmon lost due to guillotine choke submission in the first round.

After the consecutive losses, Salmon announced in a June 5, 2007, MMAjunkie.com column that he was taking a temporary leave from the UFC to fight in smaller organizations.

=== Post UFC ===
On June 9, 2007, Salmon submitted Jason Freeman at a North American Allied Fight Series event in Cleveland, Ohio called Fite Nite at the Flats III, winning via Americana keylock. On August 11, 2007, he defeated Will Hill via unanimous decision at the Xtreme Fighting Organization's "XFO 19" show. On September 1, 2007, he was defeated via guillotine choke by fellow UFC veteran Travis Wiuff in an International Fight Organization title fight.

On November 16, 2007, Salmon lost to Jorge Santiago via knockout due to a flying knee in a Strikeforce tournament which Santiago eventually won. According to Sherdog.com, and California State Athletic Commission Executive Officer Armando Garcia, Salmon suffered a seizure in the ring after he was knocked out by Santiago. Garcia also stated Salmon's career was in jeopardy.

2008 saw Salmon's return to the cage, with a TKO victory over Mitch Whitesel in an NAAFS event on September 19. Barely three weeks later, however, on October 11, Salmon's fortunes reversed, as The Ultimate Fighter 3 alumni and 3x time UFC veteran Josh Haynes forced him to tap to an ankle lock.

Salmon had been hired as a guest wrestling coach for the famed Wolfslair MMA Academy in England. He briefly left the camp to participate in one of his own bouts, to which the camp responded by telling him to come back healthy and able to train the fighters or don't return at all. On June 6, 2009, after he was unable to finish his opponent in the first round, Salmon intentionally left his arm out to be submitted. After losing by the armbar, he admitted to quitting the fight in order to be able to come back to Wolfslair healthy. He has since received criticism from the mixed martial arts community and was punished by the Ohio State Athletic Commission.

Salmon fought early UFC veteran Laverne Clark on August 20, 2011. After a slow-paced fight Clark caught Salmon with a vicious combination that knocked Salmon out, bringing his record to 17 losses (11 consecutive) and 3 wins since November 2007.

Salmon, in an interview on the podcast MMA Hour, stated that if he lost his next fight in 2014 he would formally retire from contact sports, Sean had taken the rest of 2013 after his loss to Todd Brown and a back surgery in mid-2013 to prepare for the fight in 2014, it had been rumored that he would fight veteran Jason Guida on the undercard of a Bellator event. Salmon later pulled out of the bout, set to be on the undercard of Bellator 112 on March 14, 2014, for undisclosed reasons. Salmon later officially retired from mixed martial arts competition, citing injuries and needing more time to spend with his family.

== Personal life ==
Sean and his ex-wife Missy have a son, Marcus, and a daughter, Hayden. Salmon's ex-father-in-law, Rick Pyles, is the owner of the Ohio-based Ultimate Victory Challenge promotion.

== Mixed martial arts record ==
Professional record breakdown
39 matches	18 wins	21 losses
By knockout	7	11
By submission	6	10
By decision	5	0

Res.	Record	Opponent	Method	Event	Date	Round	Time	Location	Notes
Loss	18–21	Todd Brown	TKO (submission to punches)	MFL 29	April 13, 2013	1	2:02	South Bend, Indiana, United States	
Loss	18–20	Teddy Holder	TKO (punches)	UCC: Undisputed Combat Challenge 6	November 17, 2012	1	1:46	Nashville, Tennessee, United States	
Loss	18–19	Aaron Mays	TKO (punches)	Coalition of Combat: Clash of the Titans	June 2, 2012	1	0:35	Phoenix, Arizona, United States	
Loss	18–18	João Zeferino	Submission (heel hook)	NAFC: Unleashed	November 18, 2011	1	0:25	Milwaukee, United States	Catchweight (195 lbs) bout.
Loss	18–17	Antony Rea	TKO (punches)	Desert Force: Elimination Series: Knockout Round	September 30, 2011	1	1:00	Amman, Jordan	
Loss	18–16	Laverne Clark	KO (punches)	Fight Tour	August 20, 2011	1	3:22	Rockford, Illinois, United States	
Loss	18–15	Joe Cason	TKO (punches)	NAFC: Mayhem	May 6, 2011	1	1:14	Wisconsin, United States	
Loss	18–14	Tom DeBlass	Submission (achilles lock)	Ring of Combat 35	April 8, 2011	1	0:57	New Jersey, United States	Return to Light Heavyweight.
Loss	18–13	Assan Njie	TKO (punches)	Superior Challenge 6	October 29, 2010	1	0:41	Stockholm, Sweden	
Loss	18–12	Toni Valtonen	TKO (punches)	Fight Festival 28	October 16, 2010	1	3:18	Helsinki, Finland	
Loss	18–11	Jeremy Horn	Submission (rear-naked choke)	IFC: Extreme Challenge	July 10, 2010	1	1:57	Mt. Pleasant, Michigan, United States	
Loss	18–10	Eric Cebarac	Submission (guillotine choke)	WAFC: Mayor's Cup 2010	May 29, 2010	1	0:25	Khabarovsk Krai, Russia	Lost the WAFC Middleweight Championship.
Win	18–9	Nikita Khazov	Decision (unanimous)	WAFC: Mayor's Cup 2010	May 29, 2010	2	5:00	Khabarovsk Krai, Russia	Won the WAFC Middleweight Championship.
Loss	17–9	Alexander Shlemenko	TKO (knee to the body)	Fight Festival 27	March 13, 2010	1	0:40	Helsinki, Finland	
Win	17–8	Yuki Sasaki	Decision (unanimous)	Fight Festival 26	October 17, 2009	3	5:00	Helsinki, Finland	
Loss	16–8	Allan Weickert	Submission (armbar)	NAAFS: Fight Nite in the Flats 5	June 6, 2009	2	2:05	Cleveland, Ohio, United States	
Win	16–7	John Doyle	Decision (unanimous)	Ring of Combat 24	April 17, 2009	3	5:00	Atlantic City, New Jersey, United States	
Loss	15–7	Lucio Linhares	Submission (rear-naked choke)	Fight Festival 25	March 14, 2009	1	2:07	Helsinki, Finland	
Loss	15–6	Josh Haynes	Submission (achilles lock)	SuperFights MMA: Night of Combat 2	October 11, 2008	2	2:49	Las Vegas, Nevada, United States	
Win	15–5	Mitch Whitesel	TKO (punches)	NAAFS: Night of Pain 4	September 19, 2008	2	2:08	Columbus, Ohio, United States	
Loss	14–5	Jorge Santiago	KO (flying knee)	Strikeforce: Four Men Enter, One Man Survives	November 16, 2007	1	0:24	San Jose, California, United States	Middleweight debut.
Win	14–4	Marcus Vinicios	TKO (injury)	HCF: Title Wave	October 19, 2007	2	4:22	Calgary, Alberta, Canada	
Win	13–4	Mikko Rupponen	TKO (doctor stoppage)	Fight Festival 22	September 22, 2007	1	3:32	Helsinki, Finland	
Win	12–4	Jason Jones	TKO (submission to punches)	NAAFS: Rock n Rumble	September 8, 2007	1	1:30	Cleveland, Ohio, United States	
Loss	11–4	Travis Wiuff	Submission (guillotine choke)	IFO: Wiuff vs. Salmon	September 1, 2007	1	2:37	Las Vegas, Nevada, United States	
Win	11–3	William Hill	Decision	XFO 19	August 11, 2007	3	5:00	Island Lake, Illinois, United States	
Win	10–3	Jason Freeman	Submission (americana)	NAAFS: Fight Night in the Flats III	June 9, 2007	1	1:19	Cleveland, Ohio, United States	
Loss	9–3	Alan Belcher	Submission (guillotine choke)	UFC 71	May 26, 2007	1	0:51	Las Vegas, Nevada, United States	
Loss	9–2	Rashad Evans	KO (head kick)	UFC Fight Night 8	January 25, 2007	2	1:06	Hollywood, Florida, United States	
Win	9–1	Matt Hershberger	TKO (submission to punches)	Fightfest 8	October 20, 2006	1	0:51	Cleveland, Ohio, United States	
Win	8–1	Bobby Martinez	Submission (americana)	Legends of Fighting 9	September 29, 2006	1	1:19	Indianapolis, Indiana, United States	
Win	7–1	Lucas Lopes	Submission (elbows)	Fightfest 6	September 23, 2006	2	2:44	Corpus Christi, Texas, United States	
Loss	6–1	David Heath	Submission (armbar)	FF 5: Korea vs USA	July 15, 2006	1	0:50	McAllen, Texas, United States	
Win	6–0	Hans Marrero	Submission (americana)	Diesel Fighting Championships 1	June 30, 2006	1	1:04	Dallas, Texas, United States	
Win	5–0	Danny Sheehan	TKO (punches)	FFP: Untamed 5	June 16, 2006	1	1:42	Mansfield, Ohio, United States	
Win	4–0	Jim Bundy	Submission (armbar)	Fightfest 3	May 6, 2006	1	1:27	Youngstown, Ohio, United States	
Win	3–0	Bryan Zanders	TKO (injury)	KOTC: Redemption on the River	February 17, 2006	2	1:46	Moline, Illinois, United States	
Win	2–0	Jerry Spiegel	Decision	KOTC 64: Raging Bull	December 16, 2005	3	5:00	Cleveland, Ohio, United States	
Win	1–0	Rob Wince	Submission (americana)	HHCF 24: Thanksgiving Throwdown 2	November 26, 2005	1	N/A	Columbus, Ohio, United States	
