= UFC 71 =

UFC mixed martial arts event in 2007

UFC 71: Liddell vs. Jackson 2
- The poster for UFC 71: Liddell vs. Jackson 2
- Promotion: Ultimate Fighting Championship
- Date: May 26, 2007
- Venue: MGM Grand Garden Arena
- City: Las Vegas, Nevada
- Attendance: 14,728 (13,224 paid)
- Total gate: $4,304,000
- Buyrate: 675,000

Event chronology
UFC 70: Nations Collide	UFC 71: Liddell vs. Jackson 2	UFC Fight Night: Stout vs. Fisher

UFC 71: Liddell vs. Jackson 2 was a mixed martial arts event held by the Ultimate Fighting Championship. The event took place on Saturday, May 26, 2007, at the MGM Grand Garden Arena in Las Vegas, Nevada.

== Background ==
The main event was the rematch between UFC Light Heavyweight Champion Chuck Liddell and Quinton "Rampage" Jackson. At the time of the event, Jackson was the only fighter to have an unavenged victory over Liddell, which occurred at PRIDE Final Conflict 2003 by TKO.

The UFC announced during the broadcast of the card that the winner of the Jackson vs. Liddell bout will face PRIDE 93 kg and 83 kg Champion Dan Henderson.

Mainstream sports media, especially ESPN, began extensive coverage of the UFC on this event. ESPN broadcast live the weigh-ins and post-fight coverage for UFC 71 on ESPNEWS.

Alan Belcher replaced Eric Schafer for his fight against Sean Salmon due to an injury.

== Results ==
Main card (PPV)
Weight class				Method	Round	Time	Notes
Light Heavyweight	Quinton Jackson	def.	Chuck Liddell (c)	KO (punches)	1	1:53	(Note: For the UFC Light Heavyweight Championship.)
Welterweight	Karo Parisyan	def.	Josh Burkman	Decision (unanimous) (30–27, 30–27, 29–28)	3	5:00
Middleweight	Terry Martin	def.	Ivan Salaverry	KO (suplex and punches)	1	2:04
Light Heavyweight	Houston Alexander	def.	Keith Jardine	KO (punches)	1	0:48
Middleweight	Kalib Starnes	def.	Chris Leben	Decision (unanimous) (29–28, 30–27, 29–28)	3	5:00
Preliminary card
Light Heavyweight	Thiago Silva	def.	James Irvin	TKO (knee injury)	1	1:06
Light Heavyweight	Alan Belcher	def.	Sean Salmon	Submission (guillotine choke)	1	0:53
Lightweight	Din Thomas	def.	Jeremy Stephens	Submission (armbar)	2	2:44
Light Heavyweight	Wilson Gouveia	def.	Carmelo Marrero	Submission (guillotine choke)	1	3:06

== Bonus awards ==
The following fighters received $40,000 bonuses.

- Fight of the Night: Chris Leben vs. Kalib Starnes
- Knockout of the Night: Quinton Jackson
- Submission of the Night: Din Thomas

== See also ==
- Ultimate Fighting Championship
- List of UFC champions
- List of UFC events
- 2007 in UFC
