= UFC 70 =

2007 mixed martial arts event

UFC 70: Nations Collide
- The poster for UFC 70: Nations Collide
- Promotion: Ultimate Fighting Championship
- Date: April 21, 2007
- Venue: Manchester Evening News Arena
- City: Manchester, United Kingdom
- Attendance: 15,114 (12,708 paid)
- Total gate: $2,628,472 (£1.3 million GBP)

Event chronology
UFC 69: Shootout	UFC 70: Nations Collide	UFC 71: Liddell vs. Jackson 2

UFC 70: Nations Collide was the second UFC event held in the United Kingdom, and the first in Manchester on Saturday, April 21, 2007. UFC 70 was also only the seventh UFC event held outside the United States, and the first since UFC 38. The card was broadcast live on pay-per-view in the United Kingdom and Ireland on Setanta Sports.

The televised card on Spike TV drew a 1.84 overall rating (2.8 million viewers), and at its highest point, UFC 70 drew 3.5 million viewers for the main event.

== Background ==
2006 PRIDE Open-Weight Grand Prix Champion, Mirko Cro Cop fought Heavyweight contender Gabriel Gonzaga in the main event to determine the top contender for the UFC Heavyweight Championship held by Randy Couture.

The card also featured Michael Bisping fighting in England for the UFC for the first time against UFC veteran Elvis Sinosic and Andrei Arlovski taking on prize fighter and training partner of Mirko Cro Cop and future UFC Heavyweight Champion Fabrício Werdum, who was making his UFC debut.

Reports have indicated that the UFC was targeting this event for its debut on HBO, but negotiations with HBO were not completed in time for UFC 70. As a result, the card instead aired on Spike TV in North America at 9 pm EDT on a 6-hour tape delay.

Lyoto Machida was originally scheduled to fight Forrest Griffin at this event, but Griffin is out, due to the staph infection and could not compete on the card.

== Results ==
Main card
Weight class				Method	Round	Time	Notes
Heavyweight	Gabriel Gonzaga	def.	Mirko Cro Cop	KO (head kick)	1	4:51	(Note: UFC Heavyweight Championship title eliminator)
Heavyweight	Andrei Arlovski	def.	Fabrício Werdum	Decision (unanimous) (30–27, 30–27, 30–27)	3	5:00
Light Heavyweight	Michael Bisping	def.	Elvis Sinosic	TKO (punches)	2	1:40
Light Heavyweight	Lyoto Machida	def.	David Heath	Decision (unanimous) (30–27, 30–26, 30–27)	3	5:00
Heavyweight	Cheick Kongo	def.	Assuério Silva	Decision (majority) (29–28, 29–28, 28–28)	3	5:00
Preliminary card
Lightweight	Terry Etim	def.	Matt Grice	Submission (guillotine choke)	1	4:38
Lightweight	Junior Assuncao	def.	David Lee	Submission (rear-naked choke)	2	1:55
Light Heavyweight	Alessio Sakara	def.	Victor Valimaki	TKO (punches)	1	1:44
Welterweight	Jess Liaudin	def.	Dennis Siver	Submission (armbar)	1	1:21	(Note: This preliminary bout was aired on the broadcast after the Gonzaga–Cro Cop fight.)
Welterweight	Paul Taylor	def.	Edilberto de Oliveira	TKO (head kick and punches)	3	0:37

== Bonus awards ==
The following fighters received $30,000 bonuses.

- Fight of the Night: Michael Bisping vs. Elvis Sinosic
- Knockout of the Night: Gabriel Gonzaga
- Submission of the Night: Terry Etim

== See also ==
- Ultimate Fighting Championship
- List of UFC champions
- List of UFC events
- 2007 in UFC
