= UFC 69 =

UFC mixed martial arts event in 2007

UFC 69: Shootout
- The poster for UFC 69: Shootout
- Promotion: Ultimate Fighting Championship
- Date: April 7, 2007
- Venue: Toyota Center
- City: Houston, Texas
- Attendance: 15,269 (12,516 paid)
- Total gate: $2,817,200
- Buyrate: 400,000

Event chronology
UFC Fight Night: Stevenson vs. Guillard	UFC 69: Shootout	UFC 70: Nations Collide

UFC 69: Shootout was a mixed martial arts event held by the Ultimate Fighting Championship on Saturday, April 7, 2007, at the Toyota Center in Houston, Texas. In the main event, Matt Serra shocked the UFC Welterweight Champion Georges St-Pierre with a stunning 1st round TKO. This fight was a major upset in MMA history, as St-Pierre was the 7-1 favorite heading into the bout.

== Background ==
UFC 69: Shootout was the first UFC event ever held in the state of Texas.

The card was headlined by heavy favorite Georges St-Pierre defending his welterweight title against The Ultimate Fighter 4 welterweight winner Matt Serra.

The co-main event was a rematch held between top welterweight contenders Josh Koscheck and then-undefeated Diego Sanchez. Sanchez defeated Koscheck by split decision in the semi-finals of the original Ultimate Fighter 1 series in the middleweight division; as with all TUF bouts prior to the finals, this was an exhibition bout and is not on either fighter's record.

UFC President Dana White announced the signing of former PRIDE FC heavyweight champion Antônio Rodrigo Nogueira during the broadcast.

During UFC 69, light heavyweights Tito Ortiz and Rashad Evans were in a brief ringside altercation.

== Results ==
Main card
Weight class				Method	Round	Time	Notes
Welterweight	Matt Serra	def.	Georges St-Pierre (c)	TKO (punches)	1	3:25	(Note: For the UFC Welterweight Championship.)
Welterweight	Josh Koscheck	def.	Diego Sanchez	Decision (unanimous) (30–27, 30–27, 30–27)	3	5:00
Lightweight	Roger Huerta	def.	Leonard Garcia	Decision (unanimous) (30–27, 30–27, 30–27)	3	5:00
Middleweight	Yushin Okami	def.	Mike Swick	Decision (unanimous) (29–28, 29–28, 30–27)	3	5:00
Middleweight	Kendall Grove	def.	Alan Belcher	Technical Submission (D'Arce choke)	2	4:42
Preliminary card
Heavyweight	Heath Herring	def.	Brad Imes	Decision (unanimous) (30–27, 30–27, 30–27)	3	5:00
Middleweight	Thales Leites	def.	Pete Sell	Decision (unanimous) (30–27, 30–27, 30–27)	3	5:00
Welterweight	Marcus Davis	def.	Pete Spratt	Submission (ankle lock)	2	2:57
Welterweight	Luke Cummo	def.	Josh Haynes	TKO (punch)	2	2:45

== Bonus awards ==
The following fighters received $30,000 bonuses.

- Fight of the Night: Roger Huerta vs. Leonard Garcia
- Knockout of the Night: Matt Serra
- Submission of the Night: Kendall Grove

== See also ==
- Ultimate Fighting Championship
- List of UFC champions
- List of UFC events
- 2007 in UFC
