= UFC 103 =

UFC mixed martial arts event in 2009

UFC 103: Franklin vs. Belfort
- The poster for UFC 103: Franklin vs. Belfort
- Promotion: Ultimate Fighting Championship
- Date: September 19, 2009
- Venue: American Airlines Center
- City: Dallas, Texas
- Attendance: 17,428
- Total gate: $2,400,000
- Buyrate: 375,000

Event chronology
UFC Fight Night: Diaz vs. Guillard	UFC 103: Franklin vs. Belfort	UFC 104: Machida vs. Shogun

UFC 103: Franklin vs. Belfort was a mixed martial arts event held by the Ultimate Fighting Championship (UFC) on September 19, 2009, in Dallas, Texas, at the American Airlines Center. The event was broadcast on pay-per-view.

== Background ==
This was the first UFC event to air a portion of the preliminary card live and commercial-free during an hour long block on Spike. The Efraín Escudero vs. Cole Miller, Drew McFedries vs. Tomasz Drwal, Rick Story vs. Brian Foster, and the Jim Miller vs. Steve Lopez fights were shown on Spike.

As a part of the UFC/ESPN UK regionalization strategy the bout of Paul Daley vs. Brian Foster was to air on ESPN (UK) prior to Daley replacing Mike Swick against Martin Kampmann.

The event was aired the same time Floyd Mayweather fought Juan Manuel Márquez. Mayweather/Márquez drew a smaller crowd (13,116) but its gate was considerably higher at $6,811,300. It also sold more PPV buys (1,000,000).

To date, this PPV had the largest amount of fights broadcast by the UFC (13).

It was announced on July 20, 2009 that Rich Franklin would headline UFC 103 against Dan Henderson. It was then announced on July 31, 2009 that fans were not happy with the announced headliner of Henderson-Franklin 2 so they changed the main event to feature Rich Franklin vs. Vitor Belfort. "Fans didn't like it, so we changed it," UFC President Dana White said.

A previously announced bout featuring Steve Steinbeiss was moved to UFC Fight Night: Diaz vs. Guillard. A previously announced bout featuring Aaron Simpson was moved to UFC 102.

A knee injury forced Matt Wiman out of a bout with Rafael dos Anjos on July 23. Rob Emerson filled in.

A knee injury forced Thiago Tavares out of his bout with Jim Miller on August 20. Tavares was replaced by UFC newcomer Steve Lopez.

A back injury forced Dan Lauzon out of his bout with Rafaello Oliveira and he was replaced by Nik Lentz.

An injury forced Mike Swick out of his bout with Martin Kampmann and Paul Daley moved up from the undercard to face Kampmann.

== Results ==
Main card (PPV)
Weight class				Method	Round	Time	Notes
Middleweight	Vitor Belfort	def.	Rich Franklin	KO (punches)	1	3:02
Heavyweight	Junior dos Santos	def.	Mirko Cro Cop	TKO (submission to punch)	3	2:00
Welterweight	Paul Daley	def.	Martin Kampmann	TKO (knee and punches)	1	2:31
Welterweight	Josh Koscheck	def.	Frank Trigg	TKO (punches)	1	1:25
Catchweight (159 lb)	Tyson Griffin	def.	Hermes França	KO (punches)	2	3:26
Televised (Spike TV)
Lightweight	Efraín Escudero	def.	Cole Miller	TKO (punches)	1	3:36
Middleweight	Tomasz Drwal	def.	Drew McFedries	Submission (rear-naked choke)	2	1:03
Preliminary card
Lightweight	Jim Miller	def.	Steve Lopez	TKO (shoulder injury)	2	0:48
Lightweight	Nik Lentz	def.	Rafaello Oliveira	Decision (unanimous) (29–28, 29–28, 30–27)	3	5:00
Welterweight	Rick Story	def.	Brian Foster	Submission (arm-triangle choke)	2	1:09
Light Heavyweight	Eliot Marshall	def.	Jason Brilz	Decision (split) (27–30, 30–27, 30–27)	3	5:00
Light Heavyweight	Vladimir Matyushenko	def.	Igor Pokrajac	Decision (unanimous) (30–27, 30–27, 30–27)	3	5:00
Lightweight	Rafael dos Anjos	def.	Rob Emerson	Decision (unanimous) (30–27, 30–27, 30–27)	3	5:00

== Bonus awards ==
The following fighters received $65,000 bonuses.

- Fight of the Night: Rick Story vs. Brian Foster
- Knockout of the Night: Vitor Belfort
- Submission of the Night: Rick Story

== See also ==
- Ultimate Fighting Championship
- List of UFC champions
- List of UFC events
- 2009 in UFC
