= UFC Fight Night: Diaz vs. Guillard =

UFC mixed martial arts event in 2009

- The poster for UFC Fight Night: Diaz vs. Guillard
- Promotion: Ultimate Fighting Championship
- Date: September 16, 2009
- Venue: Cox Convention Center
- City: Oklahoma City, Oklahoma
- Attendance: 9,490
- Total gate: $577,997

Event chronology
UFC 102: Couture vs. Nogueira	UFC Fight Night: Diaz vs. Guillard	UFC 103: Franklin vs. Belfort

UFC Fight Night: Diaz vs. Guillard (also known as UFC Fight Night 19) was a mixed martial arts event held by the Ultimate Fighting Championship (UFC) on September 16, 2009 in Oklahoma City, Oklahoma.

== Background ==
A previously announced bout between Josh Neer and Kurt Pellegrino was moved to UFC 101.

Justin Buchholz replaced an injured Ronys Torres in a bout against Jeremy Stephens.

Ed Herman was supposed to replace an injured James Irvin against Wilson Gouveia at UFC 102 but then Gouveia suffered an injury. Herman instead faced Aaron Simpson at the event. Dan Miller was set to replace Herman. However, an injured Miller was replaced by Jay Silva against CB Dollaway.

An injury forced Chris Lytle off the card. Jake Ellenberger replaced him.

Kyle Bradley pulled out of his matchup with Sam Stout due to injury and was replaced with Phillipe Nover. However, on the night of the fight, Nover suffered from a seizure in the locker room. His match against Sam Stout was cancelled as a result.

This event served as a lead-in to the premiere of The Ultimate Fighter: Heavyweights on Spike.

== Results ==
Main card
Weight class				Method	Round	Time	Notes
Lightweight	Nate Diaz	def.	Melvin Guillard	Submission (guillotine choke)	2	2:13
Lightweight	Gray Maynard	def.	Roger Huerta	Decision (split) (28–29, 30–27, 30–27)	3	5:00
Welterweight	Carlos Condit	def.	Jake Ellenberger	Decision (split) (29–28, 28–29, 29–28)	3	5:00
Middleweight	Nate Quarry	def.	Tim Credeur	Decision (unanimous) (29–28, 29–27, 29–28)	3	5:00
Preliminary card
Light Heavyweight	Brian Stann	def.	Steve Cantwell	Decision (unanimous) (30–27, 30–27, 29–28)	3	5:00
Welterweight	Mike Pyle	def.	Chris Wilson	Submission (guillotine choke)	3	2:15
Middleweight	C. B. Dollaway	def.	Jay Silva	Decision (unanimous) (29–28, 29–28, 29–28)	3	5:00
Lightweight	Jeremy Stephens	def.	Justin Buchholz	TKO (doctor stoppage)	1	3:23
Welterweight	Mike Pierce	def.	Brock Larson	Decision (unanimous) (30–27, 30–27, 30–27)	3	5:00
Middleweight	Ryan Jensen	def.	Steve Steinbeiss	Technical Submission (guillotine choke)	1	3:56

== Bonus awards ==
The following fighters received $30,000 bonuses.

- Fight of the Night: Nate Quarry vs. Tim Credeur
- Knockout of the Night: Jeremy Stephens
- Submission of the Night: Nate Diaz

== Reported payout ==
The following is the reported payout to the fighters as reported to the Oklahoma State Athletic Commission. It does not include sponsor money or "locker room" bonuses often given by the UFC.

- Nate Diaz: ($48,000 includes $24,000 win bonus) def. Melvin Guillard: ($14,000)
- Gray Maynard: ($24,000 includes $12,000 win bonus) def. Roger Huerta: ($21,000)
- Carlos Condit: ($48,000 includes $24,000 win bonus) def. Jake Ellenberger: ($10,000)
- Nate Quarry: ($60,000 includes $30,000 win bonus) def. Tim Credeur: ($10,000)
- Brian Stann: ($22,000 includes $11,000 win bonus) def. Steve Cantwell: ($10,000)
- Mike Pyle: ($30,000 includes $15,000 win bonus) def. Chris Wilson: ($17,000)
- C. B. Dollaway: ($18,000 includes $9,000 win bonus) def. Jay Silva: ($6,000)
- Phillipe Nover: ($20,000) vs. Sam Stout: ($24,000) ^
- Jeremy Stephens: ($20,000 includes $10,000 win bonus) def. Justin Bucholtz: ($8,000)
- Mike Pierce: ($10,000 includes $5,000 win bonus) def. Brock Larson: ($26,000)
- Ryan Jensen: ($8,000 includes $4,000 win bonus) def. Steve Steinbess: ($6,000)

^ Fight did not take place because of pre-fight seizure suffered by Nover; fighters still paid

== See also ==
- Ultimate Fighting Championship
- List of UFC champions
- List of UFC events
- 2009 in UFC
