= Carmelo Marrero =

American mixed martial arts fighter

- Born: January 26, 1981 (age 45); Philadelphia, Pennsylvania, U.S.
- Other names: The Fury
- Height: 6 ft 2 in (1.88 m)
- Weight: 255 lb (116 kg; 18.2 st)
- Division: Heavyweight; Light Heavyweight
- Reach: 73 1/2 in (187 cm)
- Fighting out of: Coconut Creek, Florida, U.S.
- Team: American Top Team
- Years active: 2004–2013

Mixed martial arts record
- Total: 23
- Wins: 16
- By knockout: 3
- By submission: 7
- By decision: 6
- Losses: 6
- By submission: 2
- By decision: 4
- No contests: 1

Other information
- Mixed martial arts record from Sherdog

Carmelo Marrero (born January 26, 1981) is an American former professional mixed martial artist who competed in the Heavyweight and Light Heavyweight divisions. He has competed for the UFC, WEC, Bellator Fighting Championships, the IFL, and the XFC.

== Background ==
Marrero was born in Philadelphia, Pennsylvania and raised in Douglassville, Pennsylvania. He was diagnosed with cancer at a young age and eventually was able to overcome the illness. Marrero began wrestling for Daniel Boone High School in Berks County, Pennsylvania and placed sixth in the state tournament as a Heavyweight. Marrero had originally wanted to attend Rider University after graduating from high school, but instead decided to attend Gloucester County College for two and a half years where he set multiple records. Marrero was sidelined by a near-fatal car accident which took him six months to recover, but later came back to win over 40 matches and qualify for the Junior College National Tournament. Marrero later transferred to Rider University where he became the team captain and was a two-time national qualifier. After college, Marrero began venturing into mixed martial arts.

== Mixed martial arts career ==
=== Early career ===
Marrero's first five professional bouts were against local opponents in small fight promotions along the New Jersey shore. Marrero would go on to win and dominate all five bouts before being signed by the UFC.

=== Ultimate Fighting Championship ===
Marrero made his UFC debut against a much larger and more experienced opponent in Cheick Kongo who already had two wins for the organization. Marrero used his superior grappling skills to control the bout and won via a split decision.

In his next fight he faced Gabriel Gonzaga, with the winner to get a shot to fight Mirko "Cro Cop" Filipović for the #1 contender spot; Marrero lost this fight in the first round via submission due to an armbar submission. He dropped down to the Light Heavyweight division to face Wilson Gouveia at UFC 71, but was again defeated via first-round submission and was then released from the UFC.

=== International Fight League ===
Marrero competed for American Top Team's camp in the International Fight League and made his debut for the organization on April 4, 2008 at IFL: New Jersey where he faced Mike Ciesnolevicz. The fight was ruled a no-contest after an accidental headbutt in the first round.

=== World Extreme Cagefighting ===
Marrero made his WEC debut on November 5, 2008 at WEC 36 against Steve Steinbeiss and won via split decision.

=== Return to the UFC ===
Following his win against Steinbeiss, Marrero returned to the UFC on April 1, 2009 facing Ryan Bader at UFC Fight Night 18. He lost the fight via unanimous decision, and was released from the promotion once again.

=== Bellator ===
Carmelo was set to make his promotional debut with Bellator at Bellator 69 against Seth Petruzelli, however the bout was canceled the day of the event due to Petruzelli not being medically cleared to fight.

Marrero made his Bellator debut on October 19, 2012 at Bellator 77 against Lew Polley and lost via unanimous decision.

== Championships and accomplishments ==
=== Mixed martial arts ===
- Cage Fury Fighting Championships
  - CFFC Heavyweight Championship (One time)

=== Amateur wrestling ===
- National Collegiate Athletic Association
  - NCAA Division I 285 lb National Qualifier out of Rider University (2003, 2004)
- Pennsylvania Interscholastic Athletic Association
  - Pennsylvania AA 275 lb 6th place out of Daniel Boone Area High School (1999)

== Mixed martial arts record ==
Professional record breakdown
23 matches	16 wins	6 losses
By knockout	3	0
By submission	7	2
By decision	6	4
No contests	1	

Res.	Record	Opponent	Method	Event	Date	Round	Time	Location	Notes
Win	16–6 (1)	Shelton Graves	Submission (leglock)	XFE 28: Atiyeh vs. Gratalo 2	October 25, 2013	1	1:33	Bethlehem, Pennsylvania, United States	
Win	15–6 (1)	J.A. Dudley	TKO (punches)	XFE: Cage Wars 24	June 8, 2013	2	1:54	Bethlehem, Pennsylvania, United States	
Loss	14–6 (1)	Lew Polley	Decision (unanimous)	Bellator 77	October 19, 2012	3	5:00	Reading, Pennsylvania, United States	
Win	14–5 (1)	Scott Barrett	Decision (unanimous)	XFC 14: Resurrection	October 21, 2011	3	5:00	Orlando, Florida, United States	
Loss	13–5 (1)	Mark Holata	Decision (unanimous)	C3 Fights: SlamFest	January 29, 2011	3	5:00	Newkirk, Oklahoma, United States	
Win	13–4 (1)	Steven Banks	Submission (guillotine choke)	WCC 3: Brawl at the Hall	October 9, 2010	2	2:33	Allentown, Pennsylvania, United States	
Win	12–4 (1)	Brian Heden	Decision (unanimous)	C3 Fights: Knockout-Rockout Weekend 4	July 17, 2010	3	3:00	Clinton, Oklahoma, United States	Return to Heavyweight.
Win	11–4 (1)	Wayne Cole	Submission (guillotine choke)	C3 Fights: Slammin Jammin Weekend 4	February 13, 2010	2	2:37	Nashville, Tennessee, United States	
Loss	10–4 (1)	Antwain Britt	Decision (unanimous)	Vendetta Fighting Championship: A Night of Vengeance	September 5, 2009	3	5:00	Oranjestad, Aruba	
Loss	10–3 (1)	Ryan Bader	Decision (unanimous)	UFC Fight Night: Condit vs. Kampmann	April 1, 2009	3	5:00	Nashville, Tennessee, United States	
Win	10–2 (1)	Steve Steinbeiss	Decision (split)	WEC 36	November 5, 2008	3	5:00	Hollywood, Florida, United States	
Win	9–2 (1)	Chuck Huus	Submission (ankle lock)	C3 Fights: Clash in Concho	September 19, 2008	N/A	N/A	Concho, Oklahoma, United States	
Win	8–2 (1)	Rader McHugh	Submission (rear-naked choke)	C3 Fights: Showdown 2	August 16, 2008	2	2:48	Cherokee, North Carolina, United States	
NC	7–2 (1)	Mike Ciesnolevicz	No Contest (accidental headbutt)	IFL: New Jersey	April 4, 2008	1	1:37	East Rutherford, New Jersey, United States	
Win	7–2	Rafael del Real	TKO (doctor stoppage)	WCO: Kerr vs. Gavin	November 7, 2007	1	5:00	Hollywood, California, United States	
Loss	6–2	Wilson Gouveia	Submission (guillotine choke)	UFC 71	May 26, 2007	1	3:06	Las Vegas, Nevada, United States	Light Heavyweight debut.
Loss	6–1	Gabriel Gonzaga	Submission (armbar)	UFC 66	December 30, 2006	1	3:22	Las Vegas, Nevada, United States	
Win	6–0	Cheick Kongo	Decision (split)	UFC 64	October 14, 2006	3	5:00	Las Vegas, Nevada, United States	
Win	5–0	Petrus Walker	TKO (doctor stoppage)	Cage Fury Fighting Championships 1	June 30, 2006	1	2:43	Atlantic City, New Jersey, United States	Won the inaugural CFFC Heavyweight Championship.
Win	4–0	Dale Carson	Submission (rear-naked choke)	MFC: Boardwalk Blitz	March 4, 2006	2	0:48	Atlantic City, New Jersey, United States	
Win	3–0	Sherman Pendergarst	Decision (unanimous)	RF 9: Battle at the Beach 2009	August 6, 2005	2	5:00	Wildwood, New Jersey, United States	
Win	2–0	Chris Volo	Decision (unanimous)	Reality Fighting 8	April 2, 2005	2	5:00	Atlantic City, New Jersey, United States	
Win	1–0	Chris Dippolito	Submission (rear-naked choke)	Reality Fighting 7	October 16, 2004	1	1:02	Atlantic City, New Jersey, United States	
