= UFC 121 =

UFC mixed martial arts event in 2010

UFC 121: Lesnar vs. Velasquez
- The poster for UFC 121: Lesnar vs. Velasquez
- Promotion: Ultimate Fighting Championship
- Date: October 23, 2010
- Venue: Honda Center
- City: Anaheim, California
- Attendance: 14,856
- Total gate: $2,237,000
- Buyrate: 1,050,000

Event chronology
| UFC 120: Bisping vs. Akiyama | UFC 121: Lesnar vs. Velasquez | UFC 122: Marquardt vs. Okami |

UFC 121: Lesnar vs. Velasquez was a mixed martial arts event held by the Ultimate Fighting Championship on October 23, 2010, at the Honda Center in Anaheim, California, United States. The event was the fourth time the UFC hosted at the Honda Center (formerly Arrowhead Pond) in Anaheim, California following UFC 59, UFC 63, and UFC 76, and the sixth event held in the Greater Los Angeles Area, including UFC 60 and UFC 104.

== Background ==
Just like UFC 111, UFC 115, and UFC 118, UFC 121 was shown in movie theaters around the United States by NCM Fathom. UFC 121 featured the return of preliminary fights live on Spike TV. UFC Primetime also returned to promote the Brock Lesnar vs. Cain Velasquez title fight.

Jon Madsen was expected to face Todd Duffee, but Duffee was forced off the card due to a lingering knee injury and was replaced by Gilbert Yvel. The event was notable for the post-fight confrontation between professional wrestler The Undertaker and Brock Lesnar following Lesnar's loss to Cain Velasquez.

== Results ==
Main Card (PPV)
| Weight class | | | | Method | Round | Time | Notes |
|---|---|---|---|---|---|---|---|
| Heavyweight | Cain Velasquez | def. | Brock Lesnar (c) | TKO (punches) | 1 | 4:12 | (Note: For the UFC Heavyweight Championship) |
| Welterweight | Jake Shields | def. | Martin Kampmann | Decision (split) (28–29, 30–27, 29–28) | 3 | 5:00 | (Note: UFC Welterweight title eliminator only for Shields.) |
| Welterweight | Diego Sanchez | def. | Paulo Thiago | Decision (unanimous) (30–26, 29–28, 29–28) | 3 | 5:00 |
| Light Heavyweight | Matt Hamill | def. | Tito Ortiz | Decision (unanimous) (29–28, 29–28, 30–27) | 3 | 5:00 |
| Heavyweight | Brendan Schaub | def. | Gabriel Gonzaga | Decision (unanimous) (30–27, 30–27, 30–27) | 3 | 5:00 |
Preliminary card (Televised)
| Middleweight | Court McGee | def. | Ryan Jensen | Submission (arm-triangle choke) | 3 | 1:21 |
| Middleweight | Tom Lawlor | def. | Patrick Côté | Decision (unanimous) (30–27, 30–27, 30–27) | 3 | 5:00 |
| Welterweight | Daniel Roberts | def. | Mike Guymon | Submission (anaconda choke) | 1 | 1:13 |
| Lightweight | Sam Stout | def. | Paul Taylor | Decision (split) (28–29, 29–28, 30–27) | 3 | 5:00 |
| Middleweight | Chris Camozzi | def. | Dongi Yang | Decision (split) (28–29, 29–28, 29–28) | 3 | 5:00 |
| Heavyweight | Jon Madsen | def. | Gilbert Yvel | TKO (punches) | 1 | 1:48 |

== Bonus awards ==
The following fighters received $70,000 bonuses.

- Fight of the Night: Diego Sanchez vs. Paulo Thiago
- Knockout of the Night: Cain Velasquez
- Submission of the Night: Daniel Roberts

== Reported payout ==
The following is the reported payout to the fighters as reported to the California State Athletic Commission. It does not include sponsor money or "locker room" bonuses often given by the UFC and also do not include the UFC's traditional "fight night" bonuses.

- Cain Velasquez: $200,000 ($100,000 win bonus) def. Brock Lesnar: $400,000
- Jake Shields: $150,000 ($75,000 win bonus) def. Martin Kampmann: $27,000
- Diego Sanchez: $100,000 ($50,000 win bonus) def. Paulo Thiago: $18,000
- Matt Hamill: $58,000 ($29,000 win bonus) def. Tito Ortiz: $250,000
- Brendan Schaub: $20,000 ($10,000 win bonus) def. Gabriel Gonzaga: $67,000
- Court McGee: $30,000 ($15,000 win bonus) def. Ryan Jensen: $10,000
- Tom Lawlor: $20,000 ($10,000 win bonus) def. Patrick Cote: $21,000
- Daniel Roberts: $16,000 ($8,000 win bonus) def. Mike Guymon: $8,000
- Sam Stout: $32,000 ($16,000 win bonus) def. Paul Taylor: $16,000
- Chris Camozzi: $16,000 ($8,000 win bonus) def. Dong Yi Yang: $8,000
- Jon Madsen: $16,000 ($8,000 win bonus) def. Gilbert Yvel: $30,000

== Aftermath ==
After his loss to Velasquez, Lesnar was confronted in the crowd by professional wrestler Mark Calaway, better known as the Undertaker who was being interviewed by journalist Ariel Helwani. Calaway seemingly challenged him to a bout asking "You wanna do it?" to Lesnar as he walked by. The two would eventually face each other in WWE at WrestleMania XXX where Lesnar defeated Undertaker to end his undefeated WrestleMania Streak.

On October 4, 2019, Velasquez made his WWE debut confronting Lesnar on the first episode of Friday Night SmackDown on Fox, thus setting up the match at Crown Jewel for the WWE Championship where Lesnar defeated Velasquez in 88 seconds.

== See also ==
- Ultimate Fighting Championship
- List of UFC champions
- List of UFC events
- 2010 in UFC
