= UFC Fight Night: Diaz vs. Neer =

UFC mixed martial arts event in 2008

- The poster for UFC Fight Night: Diaz vs. Neer
- Promotion: Ultimate Fighting Championship
- Date: September 17, 2008
- Venue: Omaha Civic Auditorium
- City: Omaha, Nebraska
- Attendance: 9,103
- Total gate: $700,000

Event chronology
UFC 88: Breakthrough	UFC Fight Night: Diaz vs. Neer	UFC 89: Bisping vs. Leben

UFC Fight Night: Diaz vs. Neer (also known as UFC Fight Night 15) was a mixed martial arts event held by the Ultimate Fighting Championship (UFC) on September 17, 2008, at the Omaha Civic Auditorium in Omaha, Nebraska.

== Background ==
The event served as the lead-in to the premiere of The Ultimate Fighter: Team Nogueira vs. Team Mir on Spike TV.

Jeremy Horn was originally scheduled to face Wilson Gouveia on this card, but was injured. He was replaced by Ryan Jensen.

== Results ==
Main card (Spike TV)
Weight class				Method	Round	Time	Notes
Lightweight	Nate Diaz	def.	Josh Neer	Decision (split) (28–29, 29–28, 29–28)	3	5:00
Lightweight	Clay Guida	def.	Mac Danzig	Decision (unanimous) (30–27, 29–28, 29–28)	3	5:00
Middleweight	Alan Belcher	def.	Ed Herman	Decision (unanimous) (29–28, 29–28, 29–28)	3	5:00
Light Heavyweight	Eric Schafer	def.	Houston Alexander	Submission (arm-triangle choke)	1	4:53
Preliminary card
Middleweight	Alessio Sakara	def.	Joe Vedepo	KO (head kick)	1	1:27
Middleweight	Wilson Gouveia	def.	Ryan Jensen	Submission (armbar)	2	2:04
Lightweight	Joe Lauzon	def.	Kyle Bradley	TKO (punches)	2	1:34
Light Heavyweight	Jason Brilz	def.	Brad Morris	TKO (punches)	2	2:54
Middleweight	Mike Massenzio	def.	Drew McFedries	Submission (kimura)	1	1:28
Middleweight	Dan Miller	def.	Rob Kimmons	Submission (rear-naked choke)	1	1:27

== Bonus Awards ==
The following fighters received $30,000 bonuses.

- Fight of the Night: Nate Diaz vs. Josh Neer
- Knockout of the Night: Alessio Sakara
- Submission of the Night: Wilson Gouveia

== Purses ==
Below are the fighter base salaries for the event. The total base fighter payroll was $305,000.

- Nate Diaz — $40,000 ($20,000 to show, $20,000 to win)
- Josh Neer — $9,000
- Clay Guida — $26,000 ($13,000 to show, $13,000 to win)
- Mac Danzig — $15,000
- Alan Belcher — $26,000 ($13,000 to show, $13,000 to win)
- Ed Herman — $16,000
- Eric Schafer — $12,000 ($6,000 to show, $6,000 to win)
- Houston Alexander — $13,000
- Alessio Sakara — $34,000 ($17,000 to show, $17,000 to win)
- Joe Vedepo — $3,000
- Wilson Gouveia — $36,000 ($18,000 to show, $18,000 to win)
- Ryan Jensen — $4,000
- Joe Lauzon — $20,000 ($10,000 to show, $10,000 to win)
- Kyle Bradley — $4,000
- Jason Brilz — $6,000 ($3,000 to show, $3,000 to win)
- Brad Morris — $4,000
- Mike Massenzio — $6,000 ($3,000 to show, $3,000 to win)
- Drew McFedries — $16,000
- Dan Miller — $10,000 ($5,000 to show, $5,000 to win)
- Rob Kimmons — $5,000

== See also ==
- Ultimate Fighting Championship
- List of UFC champions
- List of UFC events
- 2008 in UFC
