= Rob Kimmons =

American mixed martial arts fighter

- Born: January 30, 1981 (age 45); Kansas City, Missouri, United States
- Other names: The Rosedale Reaper
- Nationality: American
- Height: 5 ft 10 in (1.78 m)
- Weight: 170 lb (77 kg; 12 st)
- Division: Light Heavyweight; Middleweight; Welterweight
- Stance: Orthodox
- Fighting out of: Gladstone, Missouri, United States
- Team: Team Reaper; Perseverance Mma and Athletic Academy
- Rank: Third degree black belt in American Jiu-Jitsu; Black belt in Brazilian Jiu-Jitsu
- Years active: 2000-2013

Mixed martial arts record
- Total: 34
- Wins: 25
- By knockout: 5
- By submission: 16
- By decision: 4
- Losses: 9
- By knockout: 4
- By submission: 3
- By decision: 2

Amateur record
- Total: 7
- Wins: 7
- By knockout: 4
- By submission: 3
- Losses: 0

Other information
- Mixed martial arts record from Sherdog

Rob Kimmons (born January 30, 1981) is a retired American mixed martial artist who last competed in the Welterweight division. A professional from 2000 until 2013, he competed for the UFC, WEC, and Titan FC.

== Background ==
Raised in the small town of Rosedale, Kansas, Kimmons wrestled his junior and senior high school seasons, earning first-team all-state honors his senior year.

== Mixed martial arts career ==
After compiling an amateur MMA record of 16–0, Kimmons made his professional mixed martial arts debut on November 21, 2003, for the HOOKnSHOOT promotion. He knocked out David Webster in the first round to notch his first professional win. Rob won two more times in 2004, was signed to World Extreme Cagefighting, and was given a fight against Joe Riggs for the vacant middleweight title. Kimmons lost the fight in the first round. After winning six straight fights since the loss to Riggs, Kimmons took his second loss, this time to Ryan Jensen.

Kimmons fought for the title of World Series of Rumble Welterweight in 2006 and defeated Steve Schneider to become champion. He then fought in Shooto's American Welterweight Grand Prix, defeating all the competition with first-round knockouts or submissions to win the 16-man tournament.

In July 2007, Kimmons faced UFC veteran Marvin Eastman for the International Fighting Organization's middleweight title. Kimmons lost the fight by decision. Kimmons dropped down to the welterweight division two months later to face Tristan Yunker for the IFO's welterweight title. Kimmons won the title in the first round.

=== Ultimate Fighting Championship ===
Kimmons made his debut, defeating Rob Yundt on the undercard of the TUF 7 Finale. Kimmons submitted Yundt with a guillotine choke in round 1.

He had his second fight for the company on the UFC Fight Night 15 card, taking on Dan Miller. Miller dominated the fight and submitted Kimmons early in round one. Kimmons bounced back with a win on the UFC Fight Night 18 card by choking Joe Vedepo unconscious. Kimmons won submission of the night honors.

After suffering a TKO loss to Jorge Rivera, Kimmons plans to move to the UFC welterweight division instead of middleweight.

Kimmons was scheduled to face Mike Pierce on March 21, 2010, at UFC Live: Vera vs. Jones but was forced off the card with an injury. Pierce is now set to face UFC newcomer Julio Paulino.

Kimmons then faced Steve Steinbeiss on August 1, 2010, at UFC on Versus 2 and won unanimously.

Kimmons lost to Kyle Noke on November 13, 2010, at UFC 122 via submission (rear-naked choke) at 1:33 of round 2.

Kimmons next faced Dongi Yang on March 3, 2011, at UFC Live: Sanchez vs. Kampmann. He lost the fight via TKO due to punches near the end of the second round and was subsequently released from the promotion.

=== Post UFC ===
He faced Chuck Parmelee on September 10, 2011, winning the fight in 53 seconds via Guillotine Choke.

He faced Andre Kase on October 6, 2012, winning the fight 3:14 in the first round via TKO due to Knees.

He faced Dan McGlasson on November 17, 2012, winning the fight via Submission due to strikes.

== Championships and accomplishments ==
- International Fighting Organization
  - IFO Welterweight Championship (One time)
- Ultimate Fighting Championship
  - Submission of the Night (One time) vs. Joe Vedepo (technical guillotine choke)

== Mixed martial arts record ==
Professional record breakdown
35 matches	26 wins	9 losses
By knockout	6	4
By submission	16	3
By decision	4	2

Res.	Record	Opponent	Method	Event	Date	Round	Time	Location	Notes
Loss	25–9	Tyler Stinson	TKO (punches)	Epic Fight Night 1: Stinson vs. Kimmons	June 29, 2013	1	0:54	Kansas City, Missouri, United States	
Win	25–8	Jake Bramstone	TKO (submission to punches)	Tommy Tran Promotions	November 17, 2012	1	3:25	Branson, Missouri, United States	Return to Welterweight.
Win	24–8	Chuck Parmelee	Submission (guillotine choke)	Shark Fights 19	September 10, 2011	1	0:53	Independence, Missouri, United States	Catchweight (174 lbs) bout.
Loss	23–8	Brendan Seguin	Decision (unanimous)	Titan FC 19	July 29, 2011	3	5:00	Kansas City, Kansas, United States	Light Heavyweight bout.
Loss	23–7	Yang Dongi	TKO (punches)	UFC Live: Sanchez vs. Kampmann	March 3, 2011	2	4:47	Louisville, Kentucky, United States	
Loss	23–6	Kyle Noke	Submission (rear-naked choke)	UFC 122	November 13, 2010	2	1:33	Oberhausen, Germany	
Win	23–5	Steve Steinbeiss	Decision (unanimous)	UFC Live: Jones vs. Matyushenko	August 1, 2010	3	5:00	San Diego, California, United States	
Loss	22–5	Jorge Rivera	TKO (punches)	UFC 104	October 24, 2009	3	1:53	Los Angeles, California, United States	
Win	22–4	Joe Vedepo	Technical Submission (guillotine choke)	UFC Fight Night: Condit vs. Kampmann	April 1, 2009	1	1:54	Nashville, Tennessee, United States	Submission of the Night.
Loss	21–4	Dan Miller	Submission (rear-naked choke)	UFC Fight Night: Diaz vs. Neer	September 17, 2008	1	1:27	Omaha, Nebraska, United States	
Win	21–3	Rob Yundt	Submission (guillotine choke)	The Ultimate Fighter: Team Rampage vs Team Forrest Finale	June 21, 2008	1	3:58	Las Vegas, Nevada, United States	Return to Middleweight.
Win	20–3	Ryan Sheeper	Submission	World Cage FC	April 5, 2008	1	1:36	Missouri, United States	
Win	19–3	Fernando Rivera	Submission	Titan FC 11	March 22, 2008	1	1:10	Kansas City, Missouri, United States	
Win	18–3	Tristan Yunker	Submission (rear-naked choke)	International Fighting Organization: Kimmons vs. Yunker	September 21, 2007	1	2:55	Las Vegas, Nevada, United States	Welterweight bout; won the IFO Welterweight Championship.
Loss	17–3	Marvin Eastman	Decision (unanimous)	International Fighting Organization: Eastman vs. Kimmons	July 7, 2007	5	5:00	Las Vegas, Nevada, United States	For the IFO Middleweight Championship.
Win	17–2	Curt Bee	TKO	American Bushido: 2007 GP Final	June 2, 2007	1	1:53	McCook, Illinois, United States	
Win	16–2	Joe Enright	Submission (guillotine choke)	American Bushido: 2007 GP Semifinals	April 7, 2007	1	2:21	McCook, Illinois, United States	
Win	15–2	Jasper Mayfield	Submission (rear-naked choke)	Titan FC 7	March 23, 2007	1	1:43	Kansas City, Kansas, United States	
Win	14–2	Josh Lee	Submission (triangle choke)	American Bushido: 07 GP Quarterfinals	February 24, 2007	1	1:46	McCook, Illinois, United States	Welterweight debut.
Win	13–2	Charlie Kropf	Submission (guillotine choke)	Titan FC 6	January 26, 2007	1	1:50	Kansas City, Kansas, United States	
Win	12–2	Steve Schneider	Decision (unanimous)	World Series of Rumble	November 16, 2006	3	5:00	Kansas, United States	
Win	11–2	Sean Huffman	Submission (rear-naked choke)	Titan FC 5	August 4, 2006	1	0:47	Kansas City, Kansas, United States	
Win	10–2	Mike Van Meer	Submission (guillotine choke)	Titan FC 4	June 9, 2006	1	3:35	Kansas City, Kansas, United States	
Loss	9–2	Ryan Jensen	Submission (choke)	Victory FC 14: Aggression	May 20, 2006	1	N/A	United States	
Win	9–1	Mike Van Meer	TKO (submission to punches)	Midwest Cage Championship 2: Midwest Xplosion	April 8, 2006	2	1:56	Des Moines, Iowa, United States	
Win	8–1	Kenny Stevens	Decision (unanimous)	Titan FC 1	March 11, 2006	3	5:00	Kansas City, Kansas, United States	
Win	7–1	Darin Brudigan	Decision (unanimous)	Victory FC 12: Warpath	February 25, 2006	3	5:00	Council Bluffs, Iowa, United States	
Win	6–1	Brian Green	KO (punch)	Midwest Cage Championship 1: In the Beginning	February 11, 2006	1	0:50	Des Moines, Iowa, United States	
Win	5–1	Dan Rau	Submission (guillotine choke)	Victory FC 11: Demolition	December 3, 2005	1	2:15	Council Bluffs, Iowa, United States	
Win	4–1	James Wade	TKO (punches)	Shooto: Battle at the Ballpark	June 18, 2005	1	2:20	St. Louis, Missouri, United States	
Loss	3–1	Joe Riggs	TKO (submission to punches)	WEC 15	May 19, 2005	1	1:24	Lemoore, California, United States	For the vacant WEC Middleweight Championship.
Win	3–0	Chad Sullivan	TKO	International Sport Combat Federation: Clash of the Titans	June 30, 2004	1	0:27	Kansas City, Missouri, United States	
Win	2–0	Jason Purcell	Submission (rear-naked choke)	Victory FC 7: Showdown	March 6, 2004	1	N/A	Council Bluffs, Iowa, United States	
Win	1–0	David Webster	KO	HOOKnSHOOT: Kansas City	November 21, 2003	1	N/A	Kansas City, Missouri, United States	

== Amateur mixed martial arts record ==
Professional record breakdown
7 matches	7 wins	0 losses
By knockout	4	0
By submission	3	0
By decision	0	0

Res.	Record	Opponent	Method	Event	Date	Round	Time	Location	Notes
Win	7–0	Cameron Smith	Submission	Adrenaline Extreme Combat 5: War in the Cage 5	March 25, 2005	1	3:10	Kansas City, Kansas, United States	
Win	6–0	Tommy Eblen	TKO	Adrenaline Extreme Combat 4	January 21, 2005	2	2:10	Kansas City, Missouri, United States	
Win	5–0	Nathan Frampton	Submission	KO Fight Night Promotions: Beaumont Brawl 2	January 7, 2005	1	N/A	Kansas City, Missouri, United States	
Win	4–0	Chris Henning	TKO	KO Fight Night Promotions: Blood and Sweat	October 4, 2003	1	N/A	Blue Springs, Missouri, United States	
Win	3–0	Aaron Bollig	TKO	International Sport Combat Federation: Cowtown Rumble 3	June 21, 2003	1	N/A	Kansas City, Kansas, United States	
Win	2–0	Josh Hargis	Submission (punches)	International Sport Combat Federation: Cowtown Rumble 2	March 8, 2003	2	N/A	Independence, Missouri, United States	
Win	1–0	Mike Searcy	TKO	International Sport Combat Federation: Cowtown Rumble 1	November 16, 2002	1	0:09	Independence, Missouri, United States	

== See also ==
- List of male mixed martial artists
