= Steve Steinbeiss =

American mixed martial artist (born 1981)

- Born: Steve Thomas Steinbeiss; May 5, 1981 (age 45)
- Other names: The Hooligan
- Nationality: American
- Height: 6 ft 3 in (1.91 m)
- Weight: 185 lb (84 kg; 13.2 st)
- Division: Light Heavyweight; Middleweight
- Fighting out of: Phoenix, Arizona
- Team: Arizona Combat Sports
- Years active: 2005-2011

Mixed martial arts record
- Total: 13
- Wins: 9
- By knockout: 3
- By submission: 6
- Losses: 4
- By submission: 1
- By decision: 3

Other information
- Mixed martial arts record from Sherdog

Steve Thomas Steinbeiss (born May 5, 1981) is a retired American mixed martial artist and kickboxer. A professional competitor from 2005 until 2011, he fought in the UFC, WEC, and Bellator. In kickboxing, he fought for K-1.

== Mixed martial arts career ==
=== Ultimate Fighting Championship ===
Steinbeiss was part of the transfer of light heavyweight and middleweight fighters in the WEC to the UFC.

He was supposed to make his debut at UFC Fight Night 18 against Ryan Jensen, but the fight was pulled from the card. It was then rescheduled for UFC Fight Night: Diaz vs. Guillard. Steinbeiss lost the fight after Jensen applied a guillotine choke and the referee prematurely stopped the fight thinking Steve was out. Steinbeiss was instead giving the ref the thumbs up, the referee proclaimed that he thought Steinbeiss went limp.

Steinbeiss was expected to face Nick Catone on January 11, 2010 at UFC Fight Night 20, but was pulled from the card before the event due to injury.

Steinbeiss then faced Rob Kimmons on August 1, 2010 at UFC on Versus 2. Steinbeiss lost by unanimous decision to Kimmons and was released from the UFC.

== Kickboxing record ==
Kickboxing record
? wins (? KOs), ? losses, ? draws
Date	Result	Opponent	Event	Location	Method	Round	Time
2006-08-12	Win	(United States) Dustin Hanning	K-1 World Grand Prix 2006 in Las Vegas II, Reserve Match	Las Vegas, Nevada, USA	Decision (unanimous)	3	3:00
2006-03-03	Win	(United States) John James	World Combat League	Las Vegas, Nevada, USA	Decision (58.5-56.5)	2	3:00
2005-04-30	Win	(Norway) Dan Evensen	K-1 World Grand Prix 2005 in Las Vegas	Las Vegas, Nevada, USA	Decision (unanimous)	3	3:00
Legend: Win Loss Draw/No contest Notes

== Mixed martial arts record ==
Professional record breakdown
13 matches	9 wins	4 losses
By knockout	3	0
By submission	6	1
By decision	0	3

Res.	Record	Opponent	Method	Event	Date	Round	Time	Location	Notes
Win	9–4	Dano Moore	Submission (rear-naked choke)	Bellator 55	October 22, 2011	1	4:52	Yuma, Arizona, United States	
Win	8–4	Rudy Aguilar	Submission (rear-naked choke)	Rage in the Cage 154	September 9, 2011	1	1:23	Chandler, Arizona, United States	
Win	7–4	Travis McCullough	Submission (punches)	Griggs Entertainment: Roberts vs. Steinbeiss	August 13, 2011	1	3:20	Sullivan, Indiana, United States	
Win	6–4	Terence Joseph Medrud	Submission (kick to the body)	Crowbar MMA: Spring Brawl 2	April 29, 2011	2	2:57	Fargo, North Dakota, United States	
Win	5–4	Issac Appel	Submission (inverted neck crank)	Crowbar MMA: Winter Brawl	December 10, 2010	1	4:39	Grand Forks, North Dakota, United States	
Loss	4–4	Rob Kimmons	Decision (unanimous)	UFC Live: Jones vs. Matyushenko	August 1, 2010	3	5:00	San Diego, California, United States	
Loss	4–3	Ryan Jensen	Technical Submission (guillotine choke)	UFC Fight Night: Diaz vs. Guillard	September 16, 2009	1	3:56	Oklahoma City, Oklahoma, United States	
Loss	4–2	Carmelo Marrero	Decision (split)	WEC 36: Faber vs. Brown	November 8, 2008	3	5:00	Hollywood, Florida, United States	Light Heavyweight bout.
Win	4–1	Francisco Alcantara	TKO (punches)	Rock & Sock Promotions	June 28, 2008	1	2:33	Laughlin, Nevada, United States	
Win	3–1	Wayne Andrews	Submission (arm-triangle choke)	MTXAFN 1: Let's Get it On	January 8, 2008	1	2:11	Las Vegas, Nevada, United States	
Win	2–1	Antony Rea	KO (punch)	Bodog Fight: Vancouver	August 25, 2007	2	3:18	Vancouver, British Columbia, Canada	
Loss	1–1	Bill Mahood	Decision (unanimous)	Bodog Fight: Clash of the Nations	April 14, 2007	3	5:00	St. Petersburg, Russia	
Win	1–0	Jeff Ford	TKO (punches)	Bodog Fight: Clash of the Nations	December 15, 2006	1	3:29	St. Petersburg, Russia	
