= UFC Live: Jones vs. Matyushenko =

UFC mixed martial arts event in 2010

- The poster for UFC Live: Jones vs. Matyushenko
- Promotion: Ultimate Fighting Championship
- Date: August 1, 2010
- Venue: San Diego Sports Arena
- City: San Diego, California
- Attendance: 8,132
- Total gate: $489,685

Event chronology
| UFC 116: Lesnar vs. Carwin | UFC Live: Jones vs. Matyushenko | UFC 117: Silva vs. Sonnen |

UFC Live: Jones vs. Matyushenko (also known as UFC on Versus 2) was a mixed martial arts event held by the Ultimate Fighting Championship on Sunday, August 1, 2010, at the San Diego Sports Arena in San Diego, California.

== Background ==
The event was initially scheduled to take place at the EnergySolutions Arena in Salt Lake City, Utah. On June 14, 2010, the promotion decided to move the event to a different venue and location due to low ticket sales. The event was the second UFC event to be broadcast on Versus; the first being UFC Live: Vera vs. Jones.

Jim Miller and Gleison Tibau were set to fight at this event, but the bout was later moved to UFC Fight Night: Marquardt vs. Palhares the following month.

Two bouts were moved to this event due to visa issues; Paul Kelly vs. Jacob Volkmann from UFC 116 and Darren Elkins vs. Charles Oliveira from The Ultimate Fighter 11 Finale.

Joe Stevenson suffered a knee injury in training and was unable to fight Takanori Gomi. Stevenson was replaced by Tyson Griffin.

Willamy Freire also suffered an injury in training, forcing the cancellation of his fight with Thiago Tavares. Tavares was then pulled from the card altogether.

"Big" John McCarthy was a referee at this event, the first time he has refereed at a UFC event in almost 3 years.

Damarques Johnson originally weighed in at 172.5 pounds, 1.5 pounds over the contracted weight limit. After being granted one hour to make the original 171 pound limit, Johnson tipped the scales at 172 pounds. As a result, Johnson forfeited 20% of his purse for the fight.

The event drew an estimated 991,000 viewers on Versus.

== Results ==
Main card
| Weight class | | | | Method | Round | Time | Notes |
|---|---|---|---|---|---|---|---|
| Light Heavyweight | Jon Jones | def. | Vladimir Matyushenko | TKO (elbows) | 1 | 1:52 |
| Middleweight | Yushin Okami | def. | Mark Muñoz | Decision (split) (29–28, 28–29, 29–28) | 3 | 5:00 |
| Welterweight | Jake Ellenberger | def. | John Howard | TKO (doctor stoppage) | 3 | 2:21 |
| Lightweight | Takanori Gomi | def. | Tyson Griffin | KO (punch) | 1 | 1:04 |
Preliminary card
| Lightweight | Jacob Volkmann | def. | Paul Kelly | Decision (unanimous) (30–27, 30–27, 30–27) | 3 | 5:00 |
| Catchweight (172 lb) | Matthew Riddle | def. | DaMarques Johnson | TKO (punches) | 2 | 4:29 |
| Light Heavyweight | Igor Pokrajac | def. | James Irvin | Submission (rear-naked choke) | 1 | 2:29 |
| Middleweight | Brian Stann | def. | Mike Massenzio | Submission (triangle choke) | 3 | 3:10 |
| Lightweight | Charles Oliveira | def. | Darren Elkins | Submission (armbar) | 1 | 0:41 | (Note: This bout aired on the broadcast following the Ellenberger vs Howard bout.) |
| Middleweight | Rob Kimmons | def. | Steve Steinbeiss | Decision (unanimous) (29–28, 29–28, 29–28) | 3 | 5:00 |

== Bonus awards ==
The following fighters received $40,000 bonuses.

- Fight of the Night: Brian Stann vs. Mike Massenzio
- Knockout of the Night: Takanori Gomi
- Submission of the Night: Charles Oliveira

== Reported payout ==
The following is the reported payout to the fighters as reported to the California State Athletic Commission. It does not include sponsor money or the UFC's traditional "fight night" bonuses.

- Jon Jones $46,000 ($23,000 win bonus) def. Vladimir Matyushenko $31,000
- Yushin Okami $46,000 ($23,000 win bonus) def. Mark Muñoz $22,000
- Jake Ellenberger $24,000 ($12,000 win bonus) def. John Howard $15,000
- Takanori Gomi $80,000 ($40,000 win bonus) def. Tyson Griffin $30,000
- Jacob Volkmann $20,000 ($10,000 win bonus) def. Paul Kelly $17,000
- Matt Riddle $24,000 ($12,000 win bonus) def. DaMarques Johnson $10,000 ^
- Igor Pokrajac $12,000 ($6,000 win bonus) def. James Irvin $20,000
- Brian Stann $34,000 ($17,000 win bonus) def. Mike Massenzio $5,000
- Charles Oliveira $12,000 ($6,000 win bonus) def. Darren Elkins $8,000
- Rob Kimmons $18,000 ($9,000 win bonus) def. Steve Steinbeiss $6,000

^ DaMarques Johnson was reportedly fined 20 percent of his purse for failing to make the 170-pound welterweight limit. The CSAC's initial report did not include information on the penalty.

== See also ==
- Ultimate Fighting Championship
- List of UFC champions
- List of UFC events
- 2010 in UFC
