= Ryan Jensen (fighter) =

American mixed martial arts fighter

- Born: September 20, 1977 (age 49); Omaha, Nebraska, United States
- Nationality: American
- Height: 6 ft 1 in (1.85 m)
- Weight: 180 lb (82 kg; 13 st)
- Division: Middleweight
- Reach: 76.0 in (193 cm)
- Stance: Orthodox
- Fighting out of: Albuquerque, New Mexico, United States
- Team: Jackson's Submission Fighting; Team Quest (formerly)
- Years active: 1997; 2002–present

Mixed martial arts record
- Total: 29
- Wins: 21
- By knockout: 9
- By submission: 12
- Losses: 8
- By knockout: 3
- By submission: 5

Other information
- Mixed martial arts record from Sherdog

Ryan James Jensen (born September 20, 1977) is an American mixed martial artist who competed in the Middleweight division. A professional competitor from 1997 until 2015, he competed for the UFC, Bellator, and Strikeforce.

== Mixed martial arts career ==
=== Background ===
Jensen began training at the age of 15, under UFC 3 winner Steve Jennum. Following his first fight against Travis Fulton in February 1997, he did not compete again until June 2002. Jensen quit his day job in November 2006, and since then has been training and fighting full-time.

=== Ultimate Fighting Championship ===
His UFC debut was on August 25, 2007 at UFC 74; his initial opponent was supposed be Travis Lutter, however Lutter was forced to withdraw due to injury. Instead, Jensen faced late replacement Thales Leites and after a strong start, got caught by an armbar submission in the first round. He followed this up with another loss to Demian Maia before leaving the UFC.

On March 29, 2008, Jensen accepted a fight against Joey Villasenor on four days notice in the Strikeforce promotion. Again, after a strong start, Jensen lost by KO with 15 seconds remaining in the first round at Strikeforce: Shamrock vs. Le.

Since then, Jensen rebounded with a first round TKO over Mitch Whitesel at SportFight 23 in June 2008, as well as a first round submission victory over Aaron Praschack due to strikes in VFC 23.

Jensen then returned to the UFC and was defeated by Wilson Gouveia at UFC Fight Night: Diaz vs Neer via submission (armbar).

This was followed up by a win over Steve Steinbeiss at UFC Fight Night: Diaz vs. Guillard via first round technical submission.

Jensen faced Mark Muñoz at UFC 108 on January 2, 2010. He lost the fight via submission (punches) at the 2:30 mark of the first round.

Jensen faced Jesse Forbes at UFC 114 on May 29, 2010. He defeated Forbes by guillotine choke submission in the first round.

Jensen fought Court McGee at UFC 121. He lost the fight via arm triangle choke in the third round.

Jensen was defeated by Jason MacDonald via first round submission at UFC 129 and was subsequently released from the promotion.

=== Post-UFC ===
One year after his UFC release, Jensen returned to MMA and faced Jason Louck at Disorderly Conduct: Warriors on May 19, 2012. He won the fight via a guillotine choke submission.

He then faced Rudy Bears in the main event of Victory Fighting Championship 39 on March 30, 2013. Jensen won the fight via first round TKO.

Jensen faced Victor Moreno at Victory Fighting Championship 40 on July 27, 2013. He won the fight via guillotine choke submission.

Jensen then faced Ryan McClain at Victory Fighting Championship 42 on March 15, 2014. He won the fight via first round TKO.

=== Bellator MMA ===
After compiling a 4-0 record on the regional MMA circuit, Jensen made his Bellator MMA debut on April 18, 2014 at Bellator 117. He defeated Mark Stoddard by submission in the first round.

== Personal life ==
Jensen and his wife have two daughters.

== Championships and accomplishments ==
- Ultimate Fighting Championship
  - Submission of the Night (One time) vs. Jesse Forbes

== Mixed martial arts record ==
Professional record breakdown
29 matches	21 wins	8 losses
By knockout	9	1
By submission	12	7
By decision	0	0

Res.	Record	Opponent	Method	Event	Date	Round	Time	Location	Notes
Win	21–8	Matt Jones	TKO (punches)	VFC 45	April 4, 2015	1	3:57	Ralston, Nebraska, United States	Catchweight (180 lbs) bout.
Win	20–8	Mark Stoddard	Submission (arm-triangle choke)	Bellator 117	April 18, 2014	1	3:52	Council Bluffs, Iowa, United States	Catchweight (175 lbs) bout.
Win	19–8	Ryan McClain	TKO (punches)	VFC 42	March 15, 2014	1	1:19	Omaha, Nebraska, United States	
Win	18–8	Victor Moreno	Submission (guillotine choke)	VFC 40	July 27, 2013	1	3:12	Omaha, Nebraska, United States	
Win	17–8	Rudy Bears	TKO (punches)	VFC 39	March 30, 2013	1	1:01	Omaha, Nebraska, United States	
Win	16–8	Jason Louck	Submission (guillotine choke)	Disorderly Conduct: Warriors	May 19, 2012	1	4:28	Omaha, Nebraska, United States	
Loss	15–8	Jason MacDonald	Submission (triangle choke)	UFC 129	April 30, 2011	1	1:37	Toronto, Ontario, Canada	
Loss	15–7	Court McGee	Submission (arm-triangle choke)	UFC 121	October 23, 2010	3	1:21	Anaheim, California, United States	
Win	15–6	Jesse Forbes	Submission (guillotine choke)	UFC 114	May 29, 2010	1	1:06	Las Vegas, Nevada, United States	Submission of the Night.
Loss	14–6	Mark Muñoz	TKO (submission to punches)	UFC 108	January 2, 2010	1	2:30	Las Vegas, Nevada, United States	
Win	14–5	Steve Steinbeiss	Technical submission (guillotine choke)	UFC Fight Night: Diaz vs. Guillard	September 16, 2009	1	3:56	Oklahoma City, Oklahoma, United States	
Loss	13–5	Wilson Gouveia	Submission (armbar)	UFC Fight Night: Diaz vs Neer	September 17, 2008	2	2:04	Omaha, Nebraska, United States	
Win	13–4	Aaron Praschak	TKO (punches)	Victory Fighting Championships 24	July 26, 2008	1	2:09	Council Bluffs, Iowa, United States	
Win	12–4	Mitch Whitesel	TKO (punches)	SportFight 23	June 20, 2008	1	4:42	Portland, Oregon, United States	
Loss	11–4	Joey Villaseñor	KO (punch)	Strikeforce: Shamrock vs. Le	March 29, 2008	1	4:45	San Jose, California, United States	
Loss	11–3	Demian Maia	Submission (rear-naked choke)	UFC 77	October 20, 2007	1	2:40	Cincinnati, Ohio, United States	
Loss	11–2	Thales Leites	Submission (armbar)	UFC 74	August 25, 2007	1	3:47	Las Vegas, Nevada, United States	
Win	11–1	Curtis Stout	Submission (triangle choke)	VFC 19: Inferno	May 18, 2007	1	3:10	Council Bluffs, Iowa, United States	
Win	10–1	Alfred Escobedo	Submission (punches)	IFC: Road to Global Domination	March 4, 2007	1	1:21	Belton, Texas, United States	
Win	9–1	BJ Lacy	TKO (punches)	IFC: Rumble on the River 2	November 10, 2006	1	2:34	Kearney, Nebraska, United States	
Win	8–1	Rob Kimmons	Submission (choke)	VFC 14: Aggression	May 20, 2006	1	N/A	Council Bluffs, Iowa, United States	
Win	7–1	Marlon Sims	Submission (rear-naked choke)	IFC: Caged Combat	April 1, 2006	1	1:51	Sacramento, California, United States	
Win	6–1	Danny Anderson	TKO (punches)	VFC 10: Championship X	August 6, 2005	2	1:16	Council Bluffs, Iowa, United States	
Loss	5–1	Brock Larson	TKO (submission to punches)	Extreme Challenge 63	July 23, 2005	1	1:39	Hayward, Wisconsin, United States	
Win	5–0	Neal Rowe	Submission (rear-naked choke)	Extreme Challenge 63	July 23, 2005	1	2:00	Hayward, Wisconsin, United States	
Win	4–0	Tyrone Roberts	Submission (triangle choke)	Victory Fighting Championships 5	July 12, 2003	1	2:46	Council Bluffs, Iowa, United States	
Win	3–0	Josh Stamp	TKO (punches)	VFC 2: Bragging Rights	August 17, 2002	1	0:56	Council Bluffs, Iowa, United States	
Win	2–0	Brian Robinson	TKO (submission to punches)	Victory Fighting Championships 1	June 16, 2002	1	0:20	Council Bluffs, Iowa, United States	
Win	1–0	Travis Fulton	Submission (triangle choke)	Extreme Challenge 4	February 22, 1997	1	1:40	Council Bluffs, Iowa, United States	

== See also ==
- List of current UFC fighters
- List of male mixed martial artists
