= Gabriel Gonzaga =

Brazilian mixed martial artist (born 1979)

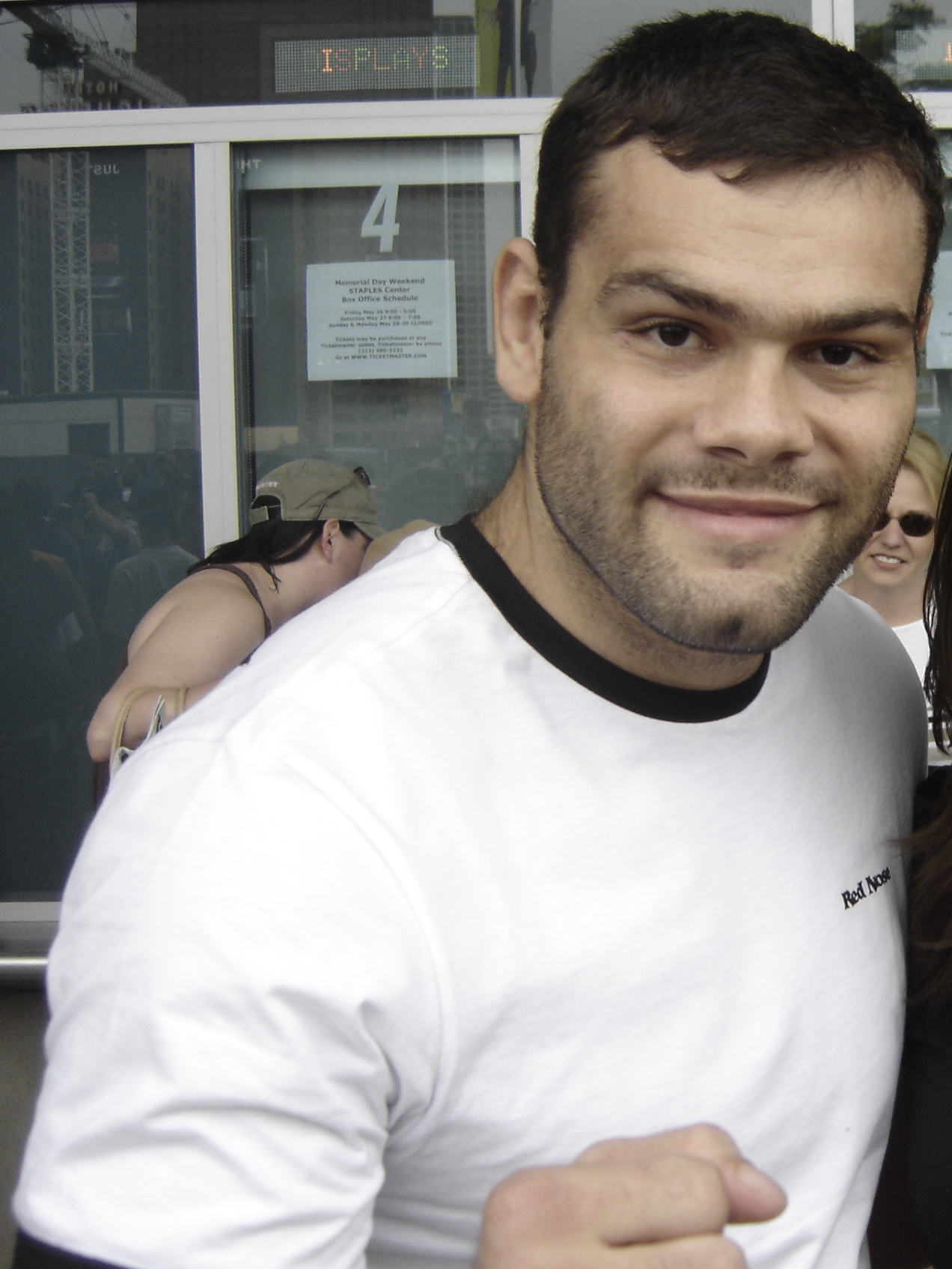
- Born: Gabriel Gonzaga Santos Nogueira; 18 May 1979 (age 47); Rio de Janeiro, Brazil
- Other names: Napão (IPA: [naˈpɐ̃w]) (Note: Gonzaga's nickname "Napão" means "big nose" in Portuguese.)
- Height: 6 ft 2 in (188 cm)
- Weight: 264 lb (120 kg; 18 st 12 lb)
- Division: Heavyweight
- Reach: 76 in (190 cm)
- Style: Brazilian Jiu-Jitsu
- Stance: Orthodox
- Fighting out of: Worcester, Massachusetts, United States
- Team: Squared BJJ, Chute Boxe Academy (formerly)
- Rank: 6th degree black belt in Brazilian Jiu-Jitsu under Wander Braga
- Years active: 2003–2016, 2018–present (MMA); 2017–present (Boxing)

Professional boxing record
- Total: 1
- Wins: 1
- Losses: 0

Mixed martial arts record
- Total: 29
- Wins: 17
- By knockout: 9
- By submission: 7
- By decision: 1
- Losses: 12
- By knockout: 10
- By decision: 2

Other information
- Boxing record from BoxRec
- Mixed martial arts record from Sherdog

Gabriel Gonzaga Santos Nogueira (Portuguese pronunciation: [ɡabɾiˈew ɡõˈzaɡɐ]; born 18 May 1979) is a Brazilian former professional mixed martial artist, submission grappler and 5th degree Brazilian jiu-jitsu (BJJ) black belt.

Gonzaga is a World IBJJF Jiu-Jitsu champion in the Ultra Heavyweight black belt division and a ADCC Submission Fighting World medallist, two of the most prestigious tournaments in the sport.

In 2003 Gonzaga started MMA. In 2006 he started competing in the Heavyweight division of the Ultimate Fighting Championship. He is perhaps best known for his upset head-kick knockout of Mirko Cro Cop at UFC 70, which earned him a heavyweight title shot.

== Background ==
Gonzaga was born in Rio de Janeiro, Brazil and began training in judo when he was 14 years old. before later transitioning to Brazilian jiu-jitsu, under the tutelage of Wander Braga. Gonzaga would go on to achieve many accomplishments in the sport before transitioning into a career in MMA.

== Mixed martial arts career ==
=== Early career ===
Gonzaga made his professional MMA debut on 4 April 2003 in Santos, Brazil against Cicero Costa, winning via submission due to punches in the first round. He went on to compile a 4-1 professional record with his only loss coming via TKO to Fabrício Werdum.

=== Ultimate Fighting Championship ===
He made his UFC debut at UFC 56, knocking out Kevin Jordan with a superman punch at 4:39 of the third round. However, weeks before the fight, his pregnant wife started having complications with her pregnancy and lost one of the twins she was carrying. Gonzaga's obligations to his wife during her high risk pregnancy left him unable to train properly.

Gonzaga would later return at UFC 60 with a win over Fabiano Scherner via TKO in the second round. At UFC 66 he would defeat Carmelo Marrero in the first round by armbar.

At UFC 70, Gonzaga knocked out Mirko Cro Cop with a head kick, Cro Cop's own signature move. With the win, Gonzaga was granted a title shot against UFC Heavyweight Champion Randy Couture. The knockout was the consensus Knockout of the Year for 2007.

Gonzaga faced Randy Couture for the UFC Heavyweight Championship at UFC 74. He lost the fight via TKO due to punches from the mount at the 1:37 mark of the third round.

Gonzaga returned to the Octagon to face the only man that had beaten him prior to the Couture fight, Fabrício Werdum, at UFC 80, losing once again via TKO in the second round.

Gonzaga faced Justin McCully at UFC 86. Early in the first round, McCully fell to the ground due to a powerful leg kick from Gonzaga. Gonzaga took to McCully's half guard, quickly passing to the mount position and winning by first round submission with an americana from the mount.

At UFC 91 Gonzaga knocked out UFC newcomer Josh Hendricks with a right hand at 1:01 of the first round.

Gonzaga then faced undefeated heavyweight prospect Shane Carwin at UFC 96. In the first 30 seconds of the fight, Gonzaga caught Carwin with an uppercut and two left hooks, breaking his nose. Gonzaga took the fight to the floor, but Carwin quickly fought back to his feet. Against the fence, Carwin pushed Gonzaga away and threw an overhand right that knocked Gonzaga out. The referee called the match at 69 seconds of round one, handing Gonzaga his fourth career loss.

Gonzaga with fan

At UFC 102 Gonzaga defeated Chris Tuchscherer via TKO at 2:27 of the first round. The fight, however, was controversial, as Gonzaga landed an illegal low blow that hurt Tuchsherer very badly. While Tuchsherer was able to continue after taking a full five-minute rest, Gonzaga landed a powerful head kick and continued to dominate the rest of the fight, eventually finishing the fight via strikes.

Gonzaga was set to fight Junior dos Santos at UFC 108; however, it was reported that he had pulled out of the fight due to a staph infection.

The fight between Gonzaga and dos Santos eventually took place on 21 March 2010 at UFC LIVE: Vera vs. Jones, with Gonzaga losing via knockout in the first round.

Gonzaga was defeated by Brendan Schaub on 23 October 2010 at UFC 121 by unanimous decision. All three judges scored the fight 30–27 after Gonzaga was out-struck throughout all three rounds by Schaub. This was also the first bout in Gonzaga's professional career to go the distance.

Following the loss to Schaub, Gonzaga was released from the promotion.

=== Post UFC ===
After being released by the UFC, Gonzaga stated that he would only compete in Brazilian jiu-jitsu but expressed interest in returning to MMA. Gonzaga returned to action against Reality Fighting Heavyweight Champion Parker Porter. Gonzaga fought Porter on 8 October where he submitted him with an arm-triangle choke in the third round, winning the Reality Fighting Heavyweight Championship.

=== Return to the UFC ===
It was announced that Gonzaga signed a new, four-fight contract with the Ultimate Fighting Championship on 16 December 2011. In his return bout, he faced Ednaldo Oliveira at UFC 142, replacing an injured Rob Broughton. Gonzaga won the fight via submission in the first round.

Gabriel Gonzaga was expected to face Shane del Rosario at UFC 146 on 26 May 2012. Gabriel was pulled from the bout against Shane Del Rosario to replace Antônio Silva against Roy Nelson, after Silva was switched to meet Cain Velasquez. Gonzaga later was forced out of the bout against Roy Nelson because of an injury, being replaced by Dave Herman.

Gonzaga was expected to face promotional newcomer and fellow Brazilian Geronimo dos Santos on 13 October 2012 at UFC 153 but dos Santos dropped off the card for an undisclosed reason. As no replacement was scheduled, Gonzaga was also removed from the card.

Gonzaga faced Ben Rothwell on 19 January 2013 at UFC on FX: Belfort vs. Bisping He won the fight via submission in the second round.

Gonzaga lost via first-round knockout to Travis Browne on 13 April 2013 at The Ultimate Fighter 17 Finale.

Gonzaga faced Dave Herman on 6 July 2013 at UFC 162, replacing Shane del Rosario who had to withdraw from the bout due to an injury. Gonzaga won via KO 17 seconds into the first round.

Gonzaga next faced Shawn Jordan on 19 October 2013 at UFC 166. He won the fight via knockout at 1:13 of round one. This was Gonzaga's second consecutive first-round knockout.

Gonzaga faced Stipe Miocic on 25 January 2014 at UFC on Fox 10. He lost the fight via unanimous decision. Post-fight, Gonzaga stated online that he broke his hand in the first round.

Gonzaga faced Matt Mitrione on 13 December 2014 at UFC on Fox 13. He lost the bout in the first round via TKO.

Gonzaga faced returning veteran Mirko Cro Cop in a rematch on 11 April 2015 at UFC Fight Night 64. After dominantly winning the first two rounds and being up 20–17 on the scorecards, Gonzaga was finished by TKO in the third round after a surprise flurry of elbows and punches managed to hurt him and turn the fight around in an instant. Gonzaga later stated that he wasn't ready for all 5 rounds, and that he was surprised by Cro Cop's strength and improved elbows. The bout earned both men Fight of the Night bonus honors.

Gonzaga faced Konstantin Erokhin on 11 December 2015 at The Ultimate Fighter 22 Finale. He won the fight by unanimous decision (30–27, 30–27, and 30–28).

Gonzaga was expected to face Ruslan Magomedov on 10 April 2016 at UFC Fight Night 86. However, Magomedov was forced out of the bout in early March due to injury and replaced by Derrick Lewis. Gonzaga lost the fight via KO in the first round.

On 30 September 2016 it was announced that Gonzaga would be retiring from the sport unless offered a 6-figure contract from the UFC.

== Professional boxing career ==
On 14 September 2017, it was announced that Gonzaga would be making his pro boxing debut for the Rivera Promotions Entertainment (RPE) boxing promotion on 26 October against Alejandro Esquilin Santiago. Gonzaga won the four-round bout via majority decision.

== Bare-knuckle boxing ==
On August 28, 2019, it was announced that Gonzaga would make his promotional debut headlining BKFC 8 against fellow UFC veteran Antônio Silva on October 19, 2019. He won the fight via knockout in the second round.

== Personal life ==
Gonzaga and his fiancé live in Massachusetts.

== Championships and accomplishments ==
=== Mixed martial arts ===
- Ultimate Fighting Championship
  - Knockout of the Night (One time)
  - Fight of the Night (Two times)
  - Tied (Andrei Arlovski, Stefan Struve & Francis Ngannou) for third most finishes in UFC history (11)
  - UFC.com Awards
    - 2007: Knockout of the Year & Ranked #3 Upset of the Year vs. Mirko Cro Cop 1
- FIGHT! Magazine
  - 2007 Knockout of the Year vs. Mirko Cro Cop on 21 April
- Fight Matrix
  - Most Lopsided Upset of the Year (2007)
- Inside Fights
  - 2007 Knockout of the Year vs. Mirko Cro Cop on 21 April
- Reality Fighting
  - Reality Fighting Heavyweight Championship (One time)

=== Brazilian jiu-jitsu ===
- Confederação Brasileira de Jiu Jitsu Olímpico
  - (gold) 2006 CBJJO World Cup Super Heavyweight Champion (Black Belt)
  - (silver) 2005 CBJJO World Cup Super Heavyweight Runner-Up (Black Belt)
  - (bronze) 2005 CBJJO World Cup Absolute 3rd Place (Black Belt)
  - (silver) 2003 CBJJO World Cup Super Heavyweight Runner-Up (Black Belt)
  - (silver) 2003 CBJJO World Cup Absolute Runner-Up (Black Belt)
- Confederação Brasileira de Jiu Jitsu
  - (gold) 2006 CBJJ Mundials Super Heavyweight Champion (Black Belt)
  - (bronze) 2005 CBJJ Brazilian Nationals 3rd Place (Black Belt)
  - (bronze) 1999 CBJJ Brazilian Nationals 3rd Place
  - (gold) 1996/1997 CBJJ Brazilian Nationals Champion (Purple Belt)
- International Brazilian Jiu-Jitsu Federation
  - (gold) 2019 World Masters IBJJF Jiu-Jitsu Championship Super Heavyweight Champion (Black Belt)
  - (bronze) 2000 World Brazilian Jiu-Jitsu Championship Super Heavyweight 3rd Place (Black Belt)
  - (bronze) 1999 World Brazilian Jiu-Jitsu Championship Super Heavyweight 3rd Place (Brown Belt)

=== Submission grappling ===
- ADCC Submission Wrestling World Championship
  - 2005 ADCC +99 kg Runner-Up
  - Opponents:
    - Won: Mustapha al-Turk (pts), Ricco Rodriguez (pts), Marcio Cruz (pts), Eduardo Telles (pts)
    - Lost: Jeff Monson (pts), Xande Ribeiro (sub)

== Mixed martial arts record ==
Professional record breakdown
29 matches	17 wins	12 losses
By knockout	9	10
By submission	7	0
By decision	1	2

Res.	Record	Opponent	Method	Event	Date	Round	Time	Location	Notes
Loss	17–12	Alexander Emelianenko	TKO (punches and knees)	RCC: Russian Cagefighting Championship 2	5 May 2018	2	3:43	Yekaterinburg, Russia	
Loss	17–11	Derrick Lewis	KO (punches)	UFC Fight Night: Rothwell vs. dos Santos	10 April 2016	1	4:48	Zagreb, Croatia	
Win	17–10	Konstantin Erokhin	Decision (unanimous)	The Ultimate Fighter: Team McGregor vs. Team Faber Finale	11 December 2015	3	5:00	Las Vegas, Nevada, United States	
Loss	16–10	Mirko Filipović	TKO (elbows and punches)	UFC Fight Night: Gonzaga vs. Cro Cop 2	11 April 2015	3	3:30	Kraków, Poland	Fight of the Night.
Loss	16–9	Matt Mitrione	TKO (punches)	UFC on Fox: dos Santos vs. Miocic	13 December 2014	1	1:59	Phoenix, Arizona, United States	
Loss	16–8	Stipe Miocic	Decision (unanimous)	UFC on Fox: Henderson vs. Thomson	25 January 2014	3	5:00	Chicago, Illinois, United States	
Win	16–7	Shawn Jordan	KO (punches)	UFC 166	19 October 2013	1	1:33	Houston, Texas, United States	
Win	15–7	Dave Herman	KO (punches)	UFC 162	6 July 2013	1	0:17	Las Vegas, Nevada, United States	
Loss	14–7	Travis Browne	KO (elbows)	The Ultimate Fighter: Team Jones vs. Team Sonnen Finale	13 April 2013	1	1:11	Las Vegas, Nevada, United States	
Win	14–6	Ben Rothwell	Submission (guillotine choke)	UFC on FX: Belfort vs. Bisping	19 January 2013	2	1:01	São Paulo, Brazil	
Win	13–6	Ednaldo Oliveira	Submission (rear-naked choke)	UFC 142	14 January 2012	1	3:22	Rio de Janeiro, Brazil	
Win	12–6	Parker Porter	Submission (arm-triangle choke)	Reality Fighting: Gonzaga vs. Porter	8 October 2011	3	1:50	Uncasville, Connecticut, United States	Won the Reality Fighting Heavyweight Championship.
Loss	11–6	Brendan Schaub	Decision (unanimous)	UFC 121	23 October 2010	3	5:00	Anaheim, California, United States	
Loss	11–5	Junior dos Santos	KO (punches)	UFC Live: Vera vs. Jones	21 March 2010	1	3:53	Broomfield, Colorado, United States	
Win	11–4	Chris Tuchscherer	TKO (punches)	UFC 102	29 August 2009	1	2:27	Portland, Oregon, United States	
Loss	10–4	Shane Carwin	KO (punches)	UFC 96	7 March 2009	1	1:09	Columbus, Ohio, United States	
Win	10–3	Josh Hendricks	KO (punches)	UFC 91	15 November 2008	1	1:01	Las Vegas, Nevada, United States	
Win	9–3	Justin McCully	Submission (kimura)	UFC 86	5 July 2008	1	1:57	Las Vegas, Nevada, United States	
Loss	8–3	Fabrício Werdum	TKO (punches)	UFC 80	19 January 2008	2	4:34	Newcastle upon Tyne, England	
Loss	8–2	Randy Couture	TKO (punches)	UFC 74	25 August 2007	3	1:37	Las Vegas, Nevada, United States	For the UFC Heavyweight Championship. Fight of the Night.
Win	8–1	Mirko Filipović	KO (head kick)	UFC 70	21 April 2007	1	4:51	Manchester, England	UFC Heavyweight title eliminator. Knockout of the Night. Knockout of the Year.
Win	7–1	Carmelo Marrero	Submission (armbar)	UFC 66	30 December 2006	1	3:22	Las Vegas, Nevada, United States	
Win	6–1	Fabiano Scherner	TKO (punches)	UFC 60	27 May 2006	2	0:24	Los Angeles, California, United States	
Win	5–1	Kevin Jordan	KO (superman punch)	UFC 56	19 November 2005	3	4:39	Las Vegas, Nevada, United States	
Win	4–1	Walter Farias	Submission (neck crank)	Shooto Brazil: Never Shake	23 October 2004	2	N/A	São Paulo, Brazil	
Win	3–1	Charlie Brown	TKO (exhaustion)	Jungle Fight 2	15 May 2004	3	N/A	Manaus, Brazil	
Loss	2–1	Fabrício Werdum	TKO (punches)	Jungle Fight 1	13 September 2003	3	2:11	Manaus, Brazil	
Win	2–0	Branden Lee Hinkle	Submission (triangle choke)	Meca 9: Meca World Vale Tudo 9	1 August 2003	1	3:54	Rio de Janeiro, Brazil	
Win	1–0	Cicero Costa	TKO (submission to punches)	Brazilian Gladiators 2	2 April 2003	1	N/A	São Paulo, Brazil	

== Professional boxing record ==
1 fight	1 win	0 losses
By decision	1	0

No.	Result	Record	Opponent	Type	Round, time	Date	Location	Notes
1	Win	1–0	(Puerto Rico) Alejandro Esquilin Santiago	MD	4	28 October 2017	(United States) DCU Center, Worcester, Massachusetts, US	

== Bare knuckle record ==
Professional record breakdown
1 match	1 win	0 losses
By knockout	1	0

Res.	Record	Opponent	Method	Event	Date	Round	Time	Location	Notes
Win	1–0	Antônio Silva	KO (punches)	BKFC 8	October 19, 2019	2	1:50	Tampa, Florida, United States	

== See also ==
- List of current UFC fighters
- List of male mixed martial artists
- List of Brazilian Jiu-Jitsu practitioners
