= Martin Kampmann =

Danish mixed martial arts fighter

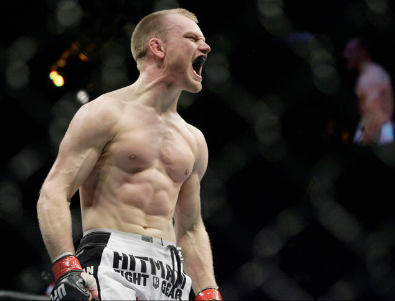
- Kampmann after his fight with Jacob Volkmann at UFC 108
- Born: April 17, 1982 (age 44); Aarhus, Denmark
- Other names: Hitman
- Nationality: Danish
- Height: 6 ft 0 in (1.83 m)
- Weight: 170 lb (77 kg; 12 st)
- Division: Welterweight; Middleweight
- Reach: 72 in (180 cm)
- Style: Muay Thai, Boxing, Submission Wrestling
- Stance: Orthodox
- Fighting out of: Las Vegas, Nevada, United States
- Team: Xtreme Couture
- Trainer: Ray Sefo, Randy Couture
- Rank: Black belt in Brazilian Jiu-Jitsu under Robert Drysdale
- Years active: 2003–2013

Mixed martial arts record
- Total: 27
- Wins: 20
- By knockout: 8
- By submission: 7
- By decision: 4
- By disqualification: 1
- Losses: 7
- By knockout: 5
- By decision: 2

Other information
- Mixed martial arts record from Sherdog
- Last updated on: July 20, 2013

Martin Kampmann (born April 17, 1982) is a Danish former professional mixed martial artist who competed in the Ultimate Fighting Championship, where he achieved success as a top 5 contender. Kampmann is often considered one of the best Mixed martial artists to never fight for a UFC championship title. In October 2012, he was ranked the number 1 welterweight in the world. He is a former Cage Warriors World Middleweight Champion.

== Background ==
Originally from Aarhus, Denmark, Kampmann began training in wrestling at the age of eight and trained for two years moving to karate at the age of 14 before transitioning into Muay Thai and boxing, competing in both as an amateur. In 2000, Kampmann began training in submission wrestling and Brazilian jiu-jitsu, before turning to mixed martial arts.

== Mixed martial arts career ==
=== Early career ===
Kampmann compiled an amateur mixed martial arts record of 8–1 before turning professional in 2003 while attending college as an engineering student. Kampmann then compiled a professional record of 9–1, capturing the Cage Warriors Middleweight Championship in the process, before being signed by the UFC.

=== Ultimate Fighting Championship ===
Kampmann competed for many years in the Ultimate Fighting Championship. He initially fought as a middleweight, where he made his debut at UFC Fight Night 6 as a late replacement for Kalib Starnes. In his debut fight with the UFC, Kampmann defeated Crafton Wallace by first-round submission. His next fight was against future top contender and title challenger Thales Leites in The Ultimate Fighter 4 Finale on November 11, 2006. Despite being dropped and hurt early in the fight, Kampmann came back and won by unanimous decision. At UFC 68, after being wobbled and knocked down numerous times, Kampmann again showed his toughness and resilience by defeating Drew McFedries via arm-triangle choke late in the first round.

His next UFC fight was scheduled for UFC 72 against former UFC Middleweight Champion Rich Franklin, but he was forced to withdraw due to a knee injury. Kampmann returned from his injury at UFC 85, where he defeated the heavy-handed Jorge Rivera by guillotine choke at 2:44 in the first round.

After a first-round TKO defeat to Nate Marquardt at UFC 88, Kampmann announced that he would drop down to the Welterweight division. He made his debut in the division at UFC 93 defeating newcomer Alexandre Barros by TKO in the second round. Kampmann then defeated the last reigning WEC Welterweight Champion Carlos Condit in a closely contested fight via split decision in the main event of UFC Fight Night 18.

Kampmann was to fight Mike Swick on September 19, 2009, at UFC 103. The winner was to receive a title shot against Georges St-Pierre. On September 4, it was announced that Swick had suffered an injury while training for their upcoming bout. Paul Daley replaced Swick for the fight. With Swick pulling out, the fight was not for the number-one contender spot anymore, as Daley was making his UFC debut. In an upset, Kampmann fell to the British fighter by TKO due to punches just 2:31 into the bout. The fight was controversial due to many considering it a premature stoppage, as Kampmann was still defending himself before the referee stepped in.

Kampmann was expected to face Rory Markham on January 2, 2010, at UFC 108. However, Markham was forced out of the bout with an injury and replaced by Jacob Volkmann. Kampmann won via first-round submission using a modified guillotine choke that he calls the "Deathchoke".

Kampmann was scheduled to face Ben Saunders at UFC 111., but was forced off the card with an injury and replaced by Jake Ellenberger.

Kampmann's next fight was against Brazilian Paulo Thiago at UFC 115. Kampmann controlled and dominated Thiago en route to a unanimous decision victory by a score of 30–27 on all three judges scorecards.

Kampmann faced former EliteXC Welterweight Champion and former Strikeforce Middleweight Champion and UFC debutant Jake Shields, on October 23, 2010, at UFC 121. He lost a controversial split decision to Shields.

Kampmann then lost another controversial decision to Diego Sanchez on March 3, 2011, at UFC Live: Sanchez vs. Kampmann. The bout saw Kampmann outstrike and stagger Sanchez over three rounds (including dropping Sanchez with a punch in the first round), with Sanchez's relentless pace and aggression giving him the nod on all three scorecards. Kampmann stopped 14 out of Sanchez's 15 takedown attempts, and also out-landed him 79–51 in total strikes (according to FightMetric, which scored the fight 29-28 Kampmann). The bout earned Fight of the Night honors.

Kampmann was expected to face John Howard on June 26, 2011, at UFC on Versus 4 However, Kampmann was forced out of the bout with an injury and replaced by Matt Brown.

Kampmann defeated Rick Story via split decision on November 19, 2011, at UFC 139. After a rough first round, Kampmann once again showed his heart and came back to win. Dana White incorrectly reported at the post fight press conference that the judge's scores had been tabulated incorrectly and should have been announced as unanimous decision in favor of Kampmann. According to the California State Athletic Commission's website and confirmed by MMADecisions.com, judge Susan Thomas-Gitlin in fact scored the fight in favor of Story.

Kampmann then faced former number-one contender Thiago Alves on March 3, 2012, at UFC on FX 2. After being rocked late, Kampmann latched a guillotine choke onto Alves with one minute remaining in the third round, forcing him to tap. For his performance, Kampmann was awarded Submission of the Night honors.

Kampmann faced Jake Ellenberger on June 1, 2012, at The Ultimate Fighter 15 Finale. After a first round which saw Kampmann nearly finished after being knocked down by Ellenberger, Kampmann defeated Ellenberger via second-round knockout due to a series of knees. The performance also earned Kampmann Knockout of the Night honors.

Kampmann faced Johny Hendricks on November 17, 2012, at UFC 154. He lost the fight via knockout in the first round.

Kampmann faced Carlos Condit in a rematch on August 28, 2013, at UFC Fight Night 27. After Kampmann controlled the action for most of the first round, Condit dominated the remainder of the fight, finishing Kampmann via TKO in the fourth round. Despite the loss, Kampmann was rewarded for his efforts and heart by earning his second Fight of the Night bonus award.

On January 9, 2014, Kampmann said that he was going to take a hiatus from fighting; he was not retiring, but needed a break. While still maintaining a "hiatus," and not ready to publicly announce his retirement from fighting, Kampmann was named full-time coach of Team Alpha Male, based in Sacramento, California in September 2014.

On January 6, 2016, Kampmann publicly confirmed his decision to retire.

== Poker career ==
In 2014, Kampmann began playing poker with Ultimate Poker with the help of professional poker player, Jason Somerville. Kampmann began this relationship as a guest on Somerville's show, Run it UP. Kampmann went on to play in multiple online and live tournaments with the sponsorship of Ultimate Poker including the Nevada Poker Challenge and the World Series of Poker Main Event. Kampmann took down the Nevada Poker Challenge and pocketed over $52,000. Although, he didn't place inside the money in the 2014 WSOP Main Event, Kampmann made an extremely deep run outlasting fellow Ultimate Poker pros Jason Somerville, Antonio Esfandiari, Danielle Andersen, Dan O'Brien and Bruce Buffer.

== Personal life ==
Kampmann is married and has two sons. He is close friend to fighters such as Randy Couture and Ray Sefo.

== Championships and accomplishments ==
=== Mixed martial arts ===
- Ultimate Fighting Championship
  - Fight of the Night (Two times) vs. Carlos Condit and Diego Sanchez
  - Knockout of the Night (One time) vs. Jake Ellenberger
  - Submission of the Night (Two times) vs. Drew McFedries and Thiago Alves
  - UFC.com Awards
    - 2007: Ranked #8 Submission of the Year vs. Drew McFedries
    - 2009: Ranked #10 Fight of the Year vs. Carlos Condit
    - 2011: Ranked #7 Fight of the Year vs. Diego Sanchez
    - 2012: Ranked #8 Submission of the Year vs. Thiago Alves
- Cage Warriors Fighting Championship
  - CWFC Middleweight Championship (One time)
  - One successful title defence
- Nordic MMA Awards - MMAviking.com
  - 2012 Submission of the Year vs. Thiago Alves

== Mixed martial arts record ==
Professional record breakdown
27 matches	20 wins	7 losses
By knockout	8	5
By submission	7	0
By decision	4	2
By disqualification	1	0

Res.	Record	Opponent	Method	Event	Date	Round	Time	Location	Notes
Loss	20–7	Carlos Condit	TKO (punches and knees)	UFC Fight Night: Condit vs. Kampmann 2	August 28, 2013	4	0:54	Indianapolis, Indiana, United States	Fight of the Night.
Loss	20–6	Johny Hendricks	KO (punch)	UFC 154	November 17, 2012	1	0:46	Montreal, Quebec, Canada	
Win	20–5	Jake Ellenberger	KO (knees)	The Ultimate Fighter 15 Finale	June 1, 2012	2	1:40	Las Vegas, Nevada, United States	Knockout of the Night.
Win	19–5	Thiago Alves	Submission (guillotine choke)	UFC on FX: Alves vs. Kampmann	March 3, 2012	3	4:12	Sydney, Australia	Submission of the Night.
Win	18–5	Rick Story	Decision (split)	UFC 139	November 19, 2011	3	5:00	San Jose, California, United States	
Loss	17–5	Diego Sanchez	Decision (unanimous)	UFC Live: Sanchez vs. Kampmann	March 3, 2011	3	5:00	Louisville, Kentucky, United States	Fight of the Night.
Loss	17–4	Jake Shields	Decision (split)	UFC 121	October 23, 2010	3	5:00	Anaheim, California, United States	
Win	17–3	Paulo Thiago	Decision (unanimous)	UFC 115	June 12, 2010	3	5:00	Vancouver, British Columbia, Canada	
Win	16–3	Jacob Volkmann	Submission (death choke)	UFC 108	January 2, 2010	1	4:03	Las Vegas, Nevada, United States	
Loss	15–3	Paul Daley	TKO (punches)	UFC 103	September 19, 2009	1	2:31	Dallas, Texas, United States	
Win	15–2	Carlos Condit	Decision (split)	UFC Fight Night: Condit vs. Kampmann	April 1, 2009	3	5:00	Nashville, Tennessee, United States	
Win	14–2	Alexandre Barros	TKO (punches)	UFC 93	January 17, 2009	2	3:07	Dublin, Ireland	Welterweight debut.
Loss	13–2	Nate Marquardt	TKO (punches)	UFC 88	September 6, 2008	1	1:22	Atlanta, Georgia, United States	
Win	13–1	Jorge Rivera	Submission (guillotine choke)	UFC 85	June 7, 2008	1	2:44	London, England	
Win	12–1	Drew McFedries	Submission (arm-triangle choke)	UFC 68	March 3, 2007	1	4:06	Columbus, Ohio, United States	Submission of the Night.
Win	11–1	Thales Leites	Decision (unanimous)	The Ultimate Fighter: The Comeback Finale	November 11, 2006	3	5:00	Las Vegas, Nevada, United States	
Win	10–1	Crafton Wallace	Submission (rear-naked choke)	UFC Fight Night 6	August 17, 2006	1	2:59	Las Vegas, Nevada, United States	
Win	9–1	Edwin Aguilar	TKO (punches)	WFA: King of the Streets	July 22, 2006	1	2:43	Los Angeles, California, United States	
Win	8–1	Damien Riccio	Submission (rear-naked choke)	CWFC: Strike Force 4	November 26, 2005	2	1:58	Coventry, England	Defended the Cage Warriors Middleweight Championship.
Win	7–1	Matt Ewin	Submission (punches)	CWFC: Strike Force 2	July 16, 2005	1	2:45	Coventry, England	Won the Cage Warriors Middleweight Championship.
Win	6–1	Brendan Seguin	KO (head kick)	KOTC: Warzone	June 24, 2005	1	2:05	Sheffield, England	
Win	5–1	Matt Ewin	TKO (retirement)	HOP: Fight Night 2	March 4, 2005	1	5:00	Swansea, Wales	
Loss	4–1	Andrei Semenov	TKO (doctor stoppage)	M-1 MFC: Middleweight GP	October 9, 2004	1	1:21	Saint Petersburg, Russia	M-1 MFC 2004 Middleweight Grand Prix Semifinal.
Win	4–0	Xavier Foupa-Pokam	DQ	EVT 2: Hazard	April 4, 2004	2	0:27	Stockholm, Sweden	
Win	3–0	Toni Vivas	TKO (punches)	EVT 1: Genesis	December 6, 2003	1	1:23	Copenhagen, Denmark	
Win	2–0	Dave Jones	KO (knee)	XFC 2: The Perfect Storm	November 9, 2003	1	N/A	Cornwall, England	
Win	1–0	Gert Mannaerts	TKO (punches)	Viking Fight 3: Rumble in the West	February 15, 2003	1	N/A	Aarhus, Denmark	

== See also ==
- List of current UFC fighters
- List of male mixed martial artists
