= WEC 36 =

WEC MMA event in 2008

WEC 36: Faber vs. Brown
- The poster for WEC 36: Faber vs. Brown
- Promotion: World Extreme Cagefighting
- Date: November 5, 2008
- Venue: Seminole Hard Rock Hotel & Casino
- City: Hollywood, Florida
- Attendance: 5,227
- Total gate: $563,578

Event chronology
WEC 35: Condit vs. Miura	WEC 36: Faber vs. Brown	WEC 37: Torres vs. Tapia

WEC 36: Faber vs. Brown was a mixed martial arts event held by World Extreme Cagefighting that took place on November 5, 2008 at the Seminole Hard Rock Hotel and Casino in Hollywood, Florida. The event aired live on the Versus Network.

== Background ==
WEC Middleweight Champion Paulo Filho fought Chael Sonnen in the co-main event of the evening in a rematch of their WEC 31 title fight, where Filho won via a controversial submission. The rematch was also supposed to be a title bout, but became a non-title fight after Filho failed to make weight. After losing the fight (but not the title) to Sonnen, Filho pledged to mail the belt to Sonnen, but the division was absorbed into the UFC on December 3, before future plans for the title could be determined, making this the last middleweight fight in WEC history.

Danillo Villefort was supposed to make his WEC debut against Jake Rosholt at this event, but was pulled from the bout after his visa expired. He was replaced by fellow WEC newcomer Nissen Osterneck.

This event was originally scheduled for September 10, 2008 but was postponed due to the threat of Hurricane Ike.

The event drew an estimated 497,000 viewers on Versus.

== Results ==
Main card
Weight class				Method	Round	Time	Notes
Featherweight	Mike Brown	def.	Urijah Faber (c)	TKO (punches)	1	2:23	(Note: For the WEC Featherweight Championship.)
Catchweight (189 lb)	Chael Sonnen	def	Paulo Filho	Decision (unanimous) (30-27, 30-27, 30-27)	3	5:00	(Note: Filho was supposed to defend the Middleweight Championship, but missed weight by four pounds, forcing the bout to be a non-title catchweight bout.)
Featherweight	Leonard Garcia	def	Jens Pulver	TKO (punches)	1	1:12
Middleweight	Jake Rosholt	def	Nissen Osterneck	TKO (punches)	2	3:48
Preliminary card
Lightweight	Donald Cerrone	def	Rob McCullough	Decision (unanimous) (30-27, 29-28, 29-27)	3	5:00
Middleweight	Aaron Simpson	def	David Avellan	KO (punch)	1	0:18
Featherweight	José Aldo	def	Jonathan Brookins	TKO (punches)	3	0:45
Light Heavyweight	Carmelo Marrero	def	Steve Steinbeiss	Decision (split) (29-28, 28-29, 29-28)	3	5:00
Lightweight	Danny Castillo	def	Rafael Dias	TKO (punches)	2	2:54
Catchweight (137 lb)	Rani Yahya	def	Yoshiro Maeda	Submission (guillotine choke)	1	3:30

== Bonus awards ==
Fighters were awarded $7,500 bonuses.

- Fight of the Night: (United States) Donald Cerrone vs. (United States) Rob McCullough
- Knockout of the Night: (United States) Mike Brown and (United States) Leonard Garcia
- Submission of the Night: (Brazil) Rani Yahya

== Reported payouts ==
The following is the reported payout to the fighters as reported to the Florida State Athletic Commission. It does not include sponsor money or "locker room" bonuses often given by the WEC.

- Mike Brown: $18,000 (includes $9,000 win bonus) def. Urijah Faber: $24,000
- Chael Sonnen: $48,250 ($19,000 win bonus) def. Paulo Filho: $30,750 ^
- Leonard Garcia: $20,000 ($10,000 win bonus) def. Jens Pulver: $33,000
- Jake Rosholt: $22,000 ($11,000 win bonus) def. Nissen Osterneck: $4,000
- Donald Cerrone: $14,000 ($7,000 win bonus) def. Rob McCullough: $18,000
- Aaron Simpson: $10,000 ($5,000 win bonus) def. David Avellan: $3,000
- José Aldo: $8,000 ($4,000 win bonus) def. Jonathan Brookins: $3,000
- Carmelo Marrero: $8,000 ($4,000 win bonus) def. Steve Steinbeiss: $6,000
- Danny Castillo: $6,000 ($3,000 win bonus) def. Rafael Dias: $3,000
- Rani Yayha: $12,000 ($6,000 win bonus) def. Yoshiro Maeda: $6,000

^ Filho was forced to surrender 25 percent of his base pay to Sonnen after failing to make weight for the fight.

== See also ==
- World Extreme Cagefighting
- List of World Extreme Cagefighting champions
- List of WEC events
- 2008 in WEC
