= Court McGee =

American mixed martial arts fighter

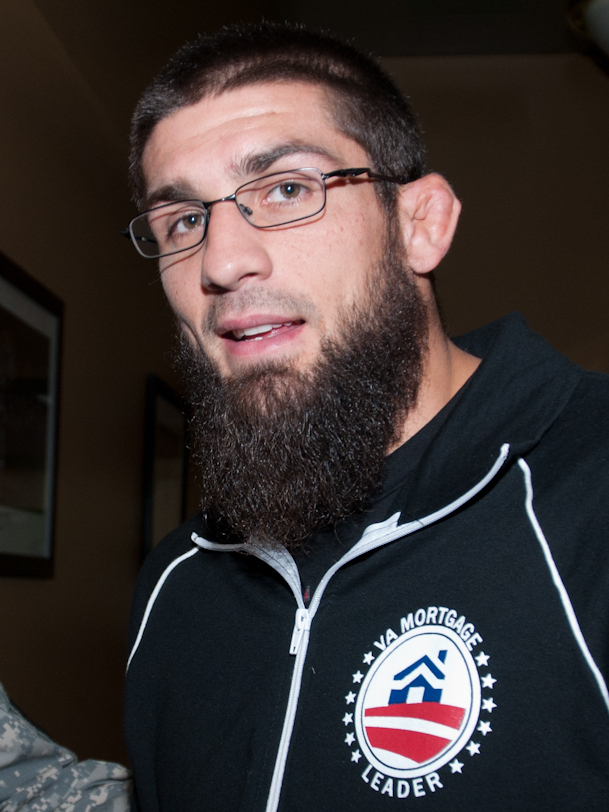
- McGee in 2012
- Born: December 12, 1984 (age 41); Ogden, Utah, U.S.
- Other names: The Crusher
- Height: 5 ft 11 in (1.80 m)
- Weight: 170 lb (77 kg; 12 st)
- Division: Cruiserweight (boxing); Middleweight / Welterweight (MMA)
- Reach: 76 in (193 cm)
- Fighting out of: Provo, Utah, United States
- Team: The Pit Elevated (2010–present)
- Rank: Black stripe red belt in Shintoshi Karate; 4th degree black belt in Kajukenbo under John Hackleman; Black belt in Brazilian Jiu-Jitsu
- Years active: 2007–2026

Professional boxing record
- Total: 2
- Wins: 2

Mixed martial arts record
- Total: 37
- Wins: 22
- By knockout: 5
- By submission: 6
- By decision: 11
- Losses: 15
- By knockout: 4
- By decision: 11

Other information
- University: Weber State University
- Boxing record from BoxRec
- Mixed martial arts record from Sherdog

Court McGee (born December 12, 1984) is an American former professional mixed martial artist who competed in the Welterweight division of the Ultimate Fighting Championship. A professional competitor since 2007, McGee mostly fought in local promotions in Utah before winning Spike TV's eleventh season of The Ultimate Fighter. As a recovering heroin addict, McGee actively gives talks on anti-drug campaigns to teenagers and launched the online "Hope 361" project to help addicts to the path of recovery.

== Background ==
Court McGee participated in high school wrestling at Layton High School placing 6th in the 5A State Division in 2002 and 3rd in the 5A State Division in 2003, under Mike Hansen. McGee also holds a background in karate, in which he has amassed over 100 kumite. After graduating from the high school, he attended Weber State University for a spell before dropping out due to lack of interest. In the early 2000s, McGee started taking painkillers in an attempt to find relief from an injury and began hanging out with the wrong crowd, a situation that would lead McGee to become addicted to heroin and cocaine. Following an overdose in which McGee was declared clinically deceased for eight minutes, he was resuscitated and as a result of the damage caused from temporary death to the brain, he had to learn how to walk and talk again. After rehab and getting himself cleaned up from substance abuse, McGee returned to Layton High School to become an assistant wrestling coach. He later picked up Brazilian jiu-jitsu and boxing, and eventually transitioned into competing in MMA professionally.

== Career ==
=== Boxing career ===
In addition to his Mixed Martial Arts career, McGee has also compiled a 2–0 record as a professional boxer in the cruiserweight division. Both fights took place in 2008, in between his MMA career.

His first fight was against Francisco Antonio Alacantara in May 2008. McGee defeated him via unanimous decision (40–35, 40–36, 39–36) in a four-round fight, having defeated Hank Weiss in an MMA fight just days earlier.

This was followed up by another unanimous decision victory (40–36, 40–36, 39–37) over Freddie Martinez. McGee revealed in June 2010 that this fight took place during his bachelor weekend.

=== Mixed martial arts career ===
==== Early career ====
McGee started his MMA career in 2007 in his home state of Utah, compiling a record of 10–1, with two technical knockouts and five submission wins. Two notable fights occurred during this period, with a submission win over DaMarques Johnson and a loss to Jeremy Horn.

In September 2008, McGee faced Isidro Gonzalez at the "Throwdown Showdown" event in Orem, Utah. McGee won the match after a unanimous decision. McGee was scheduled to compete in December 2008 against Ray Lazama for the Gladiator Challenge Middleweight title. However, the bout never transpired for unknown reasons. McGee instead faced Dayle Jarvis in July 2009. In what would turn out to be his final appearance on the local MMA circuit, McGee won by a Technical Knockout (TKO) over his opponent in under four minutes.

==== The Ultimate Fighter ====
In March 2010, McGee was announced as part of the eleventh season of The Ultimate Fighter. In the elimination round, McGee narrowly defeated Seth Baczynski after going to a sudden victory round. McGee was later picked by Chuck Liddell as his sixth pick and twelfth overall.

McGee was then defeated by the show's number one pick Nick Ring in the sixth preliminary fight. After two rounds, the judges declared the fight a victory for Ring via majority decision (20–18, 19–19, 20–18). Dana White and Chuck Liddell both stated that the fight should have gone to a third round.

When Rich Attonito broke his hand, his spot in the quarter-finals became open. Due to the controversial loss to Ring, White selected McGee to fight in his place. In the quarter-finals, McGee was set to have a rematch with Ring, but Ring pulled out of the competition due to a knee injury. James Hammortree stepped in as Ring's replacement. Early in the second round, McGee submitted Hammortree with a rare standing guillotine choke.

In the semi-finals he faced teammate Brad Tavares to earn a spot in the live finale. After a fairly even first two rounds, McGee dropped Tavares late in the third round with a left hook and locked in a fight-ending rear naked choke.

This advanced him to the TUF 11 finale where he faced Team Ortiz/Franklin fighter, Kris McCray in the main event. McGee spent half of his training camp away from his usual gym "Victory MMA", instead preferring to stick with his Ultimate Fighter coach, Chuck Liddell at The Pit. McGee defeated McCray by submission in the second round with a rear naked choke, making him the winner of the Ultimate Fighter Season 11, despite all the difficulties and bad luck he encountered on the show. McGee was also awarded the Submission of the Night award.

==== Ultimate Fighting Championship ====
McGee's first post-TUF fight was against UFC veteran, Ryan Jensen at UFC 121. Early in the first round, McGee was hit with a stiff shot that dropped him and later suffered a minor cut below his eye. In the second round, Jensen began to visibly tire and after being hit, began to bleed from the nose. McGee won the second round after a takedown just before the bell. In the third round, McGee successfully executed a takedown and a full mount, where he secured an arm triangle choke to force the tapout at 1:21 of the third round.

McGee was expected to face Jesse Bongfeldt on June 11, 2011, at UFC 131, but was reportedly forced out of the bout due to a knee injury. Matt Serra-trained fighter Chris Weidman stepped up to take McGee's place on the UFC 131 fight card against Bongfeldt.

McGee faced Yang Dongi on September 17, 2011, at UFC Fight Night 25. He won the fight via unanimous decision.

McGee faced Costas Philippou on March 3, 2012, at UFC on FX 2. He lost the fight via unanimous decision.

McGee fought Nick Ring in a rematch at UFC 149. McGee lost via a close unanimous decision. For the second time in a bout against Ring, the loss was regarded as controversial by many media sources. Stats after the fight showed that McGee outstruck Ring 32-25 in the second round and 53-16 in the final round. After the fight, McGee said "I felt like I had cage control, was more aggressive, out-struck him and attempted a submission in the third round. I should not have left it in the hands of the judges and finished the fight."

McGee made his welterweight debut against Josh Neer on February 23, 2013, at UFC 157. McGee was victorious, winning a unanimous decision after three rounds. According to Fightmetric, McGee broke the record for most significant strikes landed in a welterweight fight, landing 166 in the three round affair.

McGee faced fellow Ultimate fighter winner Robert Whittaker on August 28, 2013, at UFC Fight Night 27. He won the fight via split decision.

McGee was expected to face Kelvin Gastelum on December 14, 2013, at UFC on Fox 9. However, Gastelum pulled out of the bout with a knee injury and was replaced by Ryan LaFlare. He lost the fight via unanimous decision.

Following his loss to Ryan LaFlare, McGee was out of action for over 18 months recovering from a litany of injuries. He returned to face Márcio Alexandre Jr. on December 12, 2015, at UFC 194. McGee won the fight by unanimous decision.

McGee faced Santiago Ponzinibbio on April 16, 2016, at UFC on Fox 19. He lost the bout via TKO in the first round.

McGee next faced Dominique Steele on August 6, 2016, at UFC Fight Night 92. He won the fight via unanimous decision.

McGee faced Ben Saunders on January 15, 2017, at UFC Fight Night 103. He lost the fight via unanimous decision.

McGee faced Sean Strickland on November 11, 2017, at UFC Fight Night 120. This fight was back and forth for all three rounds and was initially announced a majority draw with scores of 30–27, 29–29, 29–29. After the fight it was revealed there was an error in calculating the judges scorecards and Strickland was declared the winner by unanimous decision.

After an eleven-month hiatus due to shoulder injury and surgeries, McGee returned to face Alex Garcia on October 27, 2018, at UFC Fight Night 138. He won the fight by unanimous decision.

McGee faced Dhiego Lima on April 27, 2019, at UFC Fight Night 150. He lost the fight by split decision.

McGee faced promotional newcomer Sean Brady on October 18, 2019, at UFC on ESPN 6. He lost the fight via a unanimous decision.

McGee faced Carlos Condit on October 4, 2020 at UFC on ESPN 16. He lost the fight via unanimous decision.

McGee faced Cláudio Silva on May 22, 2021, at UFC Fight Night 188 He won the fight via unanimous decision.

McGee faced Ramiz Brahimaj on January 15, 2022, at UFC on ESPN 32. He won the fight via unanimous decision.

McGee faced Jeremiah Wells on June 18, 2022, at UFC on ESPN 37. He lost the bout in the first round, getting knocked out by a left hook.

McGee faced Matt Brown at UFC on ABC 4 on May 13, 2023. He lost the bout in the first round, getting knocked out by a right hook.

McGee faced Alex Morono on April 6, 2024, at UFC Fight Night 240. He lost the bout by unanimous decision.

McGee faced Tim Means on October 5, 2024 at UFC 307. He won the fight via a neck crank submission in the first round, marking his first finish and submission since 2010.

McGee faced Michael Chiesa on June 14, 2025, at UFC on ESPN 69. He lost the fight by unanimous decision.

In his retirement fight, McGee faced Eric Nolan on October 3, 2026 at UFC 332. He lost the fight by technical knockout in the third round.

== Personal life ==
McGee and his wife Chelsea have three sons. The second son's middle name was taken from McGee's friend and Ultimate Fighter coach, Chuck Liddell's first name. McGee is of Irish and Scottish descent.

=== Heroin addiction ===
McGee is a former heroin addict and in 2005, he was declared clinically dead after overdosing on heroin at his cousin's house before he was resuscitated. McGee had to learn to walk, speak and function again after his first overdose. McGee said that his path into drug and alcohol abuse began when he started to hang out with "the wrong people - drinking, partying." After suffering an injury to his clavicle and elbow, McGee became dependent to painkillers, which he later mixed with alcohol. McGee had taken cocaine and heroin before overdosing. After his near-death experience, McGee suffered a couple of relapses. On an episode of The Ultimate Fighter, McGee said "I took one drink in Vegas and I ended up in Iowa four days later with no pants on and a long sleeve shirt, looking for meth. I was strung out, the heroin addict, the drunk, the liar, the cheat, the thief. That's who I thought I was. I never thought I was going to amount to nothing."

As of his bout against Michael Chiesa, he has stayed drug-free for nearly 7000 days (19 years, 2 months, and 5 days ).

=== Hope 361 project and addiction campaigner ===
Since April 2006, McGee has been clean and uses his story to encourage those who may be struggling with addictions of their own. He launched an online project named "Hope 361" where addicts would share their stories and receive positive messages and connect addicts with rehabilitation facilities. McGee regularly visits prisons, rehab and youth correctional facilities, schools and churches and gives speeches on anti-drug campaigns and facilitate rehab programs to those who needed.

Drug addiction is non-biased. It doesn't matter where you came from, who you are, religion, it doesn't matter. It doesn't matter how much money or how little money you have, drug addiction is non-biased, and it tears everybody apart. So we want to be able to provide a tool for people to use for those who are afflicted around them.

=== The McGee project ===
The McGee Project was established in 2015 and McGee is the motivation speaker where he gives speeches and provide life-saving education to high school and university students, prisons and youth detention centers regarding the disease of addiction, recovery and positive decisions and goal-setting.

== Championships and accomplishments ==
- Ultimate Fighting Championship
  - The Ultimate Fighter 11 Middleweight Winner
  - Submission of the Night (One time) vs. Kris McCray
  - UFC.com Awards
    - 2010: Ranked #5 Newcomer of the Year

== Mixed martial arts record ==
Professional record breakdown
37 matches	22 wins	15 losses
By knockout	5	4
By submission	6	0
By decision	11	11

Res.	Record	Opponent	Method	Event	Date	Round	Time	Location	Notes
Loss	22–15	Eric Nolan	KO (punch)	UFC 332	October 3, 2026	3	3:26	Salt Lake City, Utah, United States	
Loss	22–14	Michael Chiesa	Decision (unanimous)	UFC on ESPN: Usman vs. Buckley	June 14, 2025	3	5:00	Atlanta, Georgia, United States	
Win	22–13	Tim Means	Submission (neck crank)	UFC 307	October 5, 2024	1	3:19	Salt Lake City, Utah, United States	
Loss	21–13	Alex Morono	Decision (unanimous)	UFC Fight Night: Allen vs. Curtis 2	April 6, 2024	3	5:00	Las Vegas, Nevada, United States	
Loss	21–12	Matt Brown	KO (punch)	UFC on ABC: Rozenstruik vs. Almeida	May 13, 2023	1	4:09	Charlotte, North Carolina, United States	
Loss	21–11	Jeremiah Wells	KO (punch)	UFC on ESPN: Kattar vs. Emmett	June 18, 2022	1	1:34	Austin, Texas, United States	
Win	21–10	Ramiz Brahimaj	Decision (unanimous)	UFC on ESPN: Kattar vs. Chikadze	January 15, 2022	3	5:00	Las Vegas, Nevada, United States	
Win	20–10	Cláudio Silva	Decision (unanimous)	UFC Fight Night: Font vs. Garbrandt	May 22, 2021	3	5:00	Las Vegas, Nevada, United States	
Loss	19–10	Carlos Condit	Decision (unanimous)	UFC on ESPN: Holm vs. Aldana	October 4, 2020	3	5:00	Abu Dhabi, United Arab Emirates	
Loss	19–9	Sean Brady	Decision (unanimous)	UFC on ESPN: Reyes vs. Weidman	October 18, 2019	3	5:00	Boston, Massachusetts, United States	
Loss	19–8	Dhiego Lima	Decision (split)	UFC Fight Night: Jacaré vs. Hermansson	April 27, 2019	3	5:00	Sunrise, Florida, United States	
Win	19–7	Alex Garcia	Decision (unanimous)	UFC Fight Night: Volkan vs. Smith	October 27, 2018	3	5:00	Moncton, New Brunswick, Canada	
Loss	18–7	Sean Strickland	Decision (unanimous)	UFC Fight Night: Poirier vs. Pettis	November 11, 2017	3	5:00	Norfolk, Virginia, United States	Originally announced as a majority draw; overturned due to a miscalculation in scores.
Loss	18–6	Ben Saunders	Decision (unanimous)	UFC Fight Night: Rodríguez vs. Penn	January 15, 2017	3	5:00	Phoenix, Arizona, United States	
Win	18–5	Dominique Steele	Decision (unanimous)	UFC Fight Night: Rodríguez vs. Caceres	August 6, 2016	3	5:00	Salt Lake City, Utah, United States	
Loss	17–5	Santiago Ponzinibbio	TKO (punches)	UFC on Fox: Teixeira vs. Evans	April 16, 2016	1	4:15	Tampa, Florida, United States	
Win	17–4	Márcio Alexandre Jr.	Decision (unanimous)	UFC 194	December 12, 2015	3	5:00	Las Vegas, Nevada, United States	
Loss	16–4	Ryan LaFlare	Decision (unanimous)	UFC on Fox: Johnson vs. Benavidez 2	December 14, 2013	3	5:00	Sacramento, California, United States	
Win	16–3	Robert Whittaker	Decision (split)	UFC Fight Night: Condit vs. Kampmann 2	August 28, 2013	3	5:00	Indianapolis, Indiana, United States	
Win	15–3	Josh Neer	Decision (unanimous)	UFC 157	February 23, 2013	3	5:00	Anaheim, California, United States	Welterweight debut.
Loss	14–3	Nick Ring	Decision (unanimous)	UFC 149	July 21, 2012	3	5:00	Calgary, Alberta, Canada	
Loss	14–2	Costas Philippou	Decision (unanimous)	UFC on FX: Alves vs. Kampmann	March 3, 2012	3	5:00	Sydney, Australia	
Win	14–1	Yang Dongi	Decision (unanimous)	UFC Fight Night: Shields vs. Ellenberger	September 17, 2011	3	5:00	New Orleans, Louisiana, United States	
Win	13–1	Ryan Jensen	Submission (arm-triangle choke)	UFC 121	October 23, 2010	3	1:21	Anaheim, California, United States	
Win	12–1	Kris McCray	Submission (rear-naked choke)	The Ultimate Fighter: Team Liddell vs. Team Ortiz Finale	June 19, 2010	2	3:41	Las Vegas, Nevada, United States	Won The Ultimate Fighter 11 Middleweight Tournament. Submission of the Night.
Win	11–1	Dayle Jarvis	TKO (punches)	Xtreme Combat 4	July 18, 2009	1	3:47	Richfield, Utah, United States	
Win	10–1	Isidro Gonzalez	Decision (unanimous)	Throwdown Showdown 2	September 26, 2008	1	3:06	Orem, Utah, United States	
Win	9–1	Hank Weiss	Decision (unanimous)	Jeremy Horn's Elite Fight Night 2	May 17, 2008	3	5:00	Salt Lake City, Utah, United States	
Win	8–1	Chad Maheau	TKO (punches)	Kraze in the Cage: Chapter 7, Vol. 2	March 22, 2008	1	0:00	Rock Springs, Wyoming, United States	
Win	7–1	Clint Riser	TKO (submission to punches)	Kraze in the Cage: Chapter 7, Vol. 1	January 26, 2008	1	0:00	Rock Springs, Wyoming, United States	
Loss	6–1	Jeremy Horn	Decision (unanimous)	UCE Round 28: Worlds Collide	December 1, 2007	3	5:00	Salt Lake City, Utah, United States	
Win	6–0	Justin Ellison	TKO (submission to punches)	Cage FC 3	August 10, 2007	1	2:33	Ogden, Utah, United States	
Win	5–0	DaMarques Johnson	Submission (guillotine choke)	UCE Round 26: Finals	June 16, 2007	3	1:50	St. George, Utah, United States	
Win	4–0	Ben Fuimaono	Submission (arm-triangle choke)	UCE Round 26: Episode 9	June 2, 2007	3	2:53	Sandy, Utah, United States	
Win	3–0	Jarrett Kelton	TKO (punches)	UCE Round 26: Episode 6	May 12, 2007	2	1:40	Ogden, Utah, United States	
Win	2–0	Nick Rossborough	Decision (unanimous)	UCE Round 26: Episode 3	April 21, 2007	3	5:00	Sandy, Utah, United States	
Win	1–0	Ry Stone	Submission (rear naked choke)	Bush Cree Promotions 2	March 30, 2007	2	1:06	Grand Junction, Colorado, United States	

Exhibition record breakdown		
4 matches	3 wins	1 loss
By knockout	0	0
By submission	2	0
By decision	1	1

Res.	Record	Opponent	Method	Event	Date	Round	Time	Location	Notes
Win	3–1	Brad Tavares	Technical submission (rear-naked choke)	The Ultimate Fighter: Team Liddell vs. Team Ortiz		3	4:45	Las Vegas, Nevada, United States	The Ultimate Fighter 11 Semi-finals
Win	2–1	James Hammortree	Submission (standing guillotine choke)	The Ultimate Fighter: Team Liddell vs. Team Ortiz		2	0:28	Las Vegas, Nevada, United States	The Ultimate Fighter 11 Quarter-finals, replacement for an injured Rich Attonito
Loss	1–1	Nick Ring	Decision (majority)	The Ultimate Fighter: Team Liddell vs. Team Ortiz		2	5:00	Las Vegas, Nevada, United States	The Ultimate Fighter 11 Preliminary bout
Win	1–0	Seth Baczynski	Decision (unanimous)	The Ultimate Fighter: Team Liddell vs. Team Ortiz		3	5:00	Las Vegas, Nevada, United States	The Ultimate Fighter 11 Elimination bout

== See also ==
- List of male mixed martial artists
