= Yang Dongi =

Korean mixed martial arts fighter

- Born: December 7, 1984 (age 41); Seoul, South Korea
- Other names: The Ox
- Nationality: South Korean
- Height: 5 ft 11 in (180 cm)
- Weight: 242 lb (110 kg; 17 st 4 lb)
- Division: Heavyweight; Middleweight
- Reach: 73 in (185 cm)
- Fighting out of: Seoul, South Korea
- Team: Itaewon MMA
- Rank: 4th Dan Black Belt in Yongmudo; 3rd Dan Black Belt in Judo; 2nd Dan Black Belt in Taekwondo
- Years active: 2007-2008; 2010-2016; 2018-2019

Mixed martial arts record
- Total: 18
- Wins: 14
- By knockout: 13
- By submission: 1
- Losses: 4
- By knockout: 1
- By decision: 3

Other information
- Mixed martial arts record from Sherdog

Yang Dongi (born December 7, 1984), often anglicised to Dongi Yang or Dong-Yi Yang, is a South Korean mixed martial artist who currently competes in the Middleweight division of ONE Championship. A professional MMA competitor since 2007, Yang has formerly competed for DEEP and World Victory Road.

== Mixed martial arts career ==
=== Early career ===
Yang began his professional career in South Korea in a tournament. Yang won three successive fights (the first via triangle choke submission and the next two via TKO to punches).

Yang followed this up with a win at the Super Sambo Festival, again via TKO (punches).

=== Rise to prominence in Asia ===
Yang then joined the larger DEEP promotion. Here, Yang won two successive bouts, both via TKO (punches).

Yang then joined Sengoku and competed in their Sengoku Fourth Battle event. His opponent was Polish judoka Pawel Nastula. After 2:15 of the second round, Yang was victorious via TKO (exhaustion) The fight was slightly controversial due to Yang landing a knee in the clinch that earned him a yellow card. After this, Nastula was noticeably sluggish and would later complain of a groin problem. For "inexplicable reasons" the referee stopped the fight and gave a TKO verdict.

Yang then defeated two opponents; one in Japan and one in the Northern Mariana Islands. As was becoming a pattern in his career, Yang won both fights via TKO (punches).

=== Ultimate Fighting Championship ===
In June 2010, Yang signed with the UFC, joining Chan Sung Jung as the members of Korean Top Team competing in Zuffa organizations.

Yang's UFC debut was at UFC 121 against The Ultimate Fighter competitor Chris Camozzi. Yang began the fight with a successful takedown, followed by ground-and-pound. After standing up, Camozzi was able to keep Yang at bay with kicks, before engaging in the clinch. However, Yang's thick neck and shoulders prevented effective attacks. Later, Camozzi was able to effectively time the advance of Yang. In the third, Yang began to swing wildly, to no avail. Camozzi was declared the winner via split decision (29–28, 28–29, 29–28).

Yang next fight was against Rob Kimmons on March 3, 2011 at UFC Live: Sanchez vs. Kampmann. Yang won the fight by TKO near the end of the second round, giving him his first UFC win.

Yang faced Court McGee on September 17, 2011 in the co-main event at UFC Fight Night 25. The match was a pure back and forth kickboxing match. Yang was able to have some success and connected with some punches that wobbled McGee, in the end it was not enough to get the victory.

Yang faced Brad Tavares on May 15, 2012 at UFC on Fuel TV: Korean Zombie vs. Poirier. Yang was defeated by Tavares via unanimous decision and was subsequently released from the promotion.

=== Post-UFC ===
On June 29, 2013 Yang defeated ROAD FC veteran Jae Young Kim by TKO in the second round at Top FC 1 in South Korea. Yang followed that up with an impressive first round TKO of fellow UFC veteran Dennis Hallman at Top FC 6 on April 5, 2015.

=== Return to UFC ===
In late August, it was confirmed that Yang had re-signed with the UFC and will continue competing in the promotion's Middleweight division. He faced Jake Collier at UFC Fight Night 79 on November 28, 2015. He won the fight via TKO in the second round.

Yang was expected to face promotional newcomer Ryan Janes on October 15, 2016 at UFC Fight Night 97. However, the promotion announced on October 6 that they had cancelled the event entirely.

=== Post-UFC ===
Yang returned to competition three years later to face Chinese fighter Paul Cheng. He won via first-round TKO.

Yang fought again a year later against Brazilian Callyugibrainn Marinho Borges. The two engaged in a wild brawl, and Yang was defeated via TKO in the first round.

== Mixed martial arts record ==
Professional record breakdown
18 matches	14 wins	4 losses
By knockout	13	1
By submission	1	0
By decision	0	3

Res.	Record	Opponent	Method	Event	Date	Round	Time	Location	Notes
Loss	14–4	Cally Gibrainn de Oliveira	TKO (punches)	Double G FC 2	March 30, 2019	1	4:24	Seoul, South Korea	
Win	14–3	Paul Cheng	TKO (punches)	Double G FC 1	November 18, 2018	1	2:06	Seoul, South Korea	Return to Heavyweight.
Win	13–3	Jake Collier	TKO (punches)	UFC Fight Night: Henderson vs. Masvidal	November 28, 2015	2	1:50	Seoul, South Korea	
Win	12–3	Dennis Hallman	TKO (punches)	Top FC 6: Unbreakable Dream	April 5, 2015	1	3:25	Seoul, South Korea	Catchweight (198) lb bout.
Win	11–3	Jae Young Kim	TKO (body kicks and punches)	Top FC 1: Original	June 29, 2013	2	4:06	Seoul, South Korea	
Loss	10–3	Brad Tavares	Decision (unanimous)	UFC on Fuel TV: Korean Zombie vs. Poirier	May 15, 2012	3	5:00	Fairfax, Virginia, United States	
Loss	10–2	Court McGee	Decision (unanimous)	UFC Fight Night: Shields vs. Ellenberger	September 17, 2011	3	5:00	New Orleans, Louisiana, United States	
Win	10–1	Rob Kimmons	TKO (punches)	UFC Live: Sanchez vs. Kampmann	March 3, 2011	2	4:47	Louisville, Kentucky, United States	
Loss	9–1	Chris Camozzi	Decision (split)	UFC 121	October 23, 2010	3	5:00	Anaheim, California, United States	
Win	9–0	Bill Saures	TKO (punches)	Trench Warz 12: Battle Brawl	May 21, 2010	1	1:07	Saipan, Northern Mariana Islands	Middleweight debut.
Win	8–0	Ryuta Noji	TKO (punches)	Heat 8	December 14, 2008	2	3:17	Tokyo, Japan	
Win	7–0	Pawel Nastula	TKO (exhaustion)	World Victory Road Presents: Sengoku 4	August 24, 2008	2	2:15	Saitama, Japan	
Win	6–0	Keigo Takamori	TKO (punches)	Deep: 31 Impact	August 5, 2007	1	1:57	Tokyo, Japan	Openweight bout.
Win	5–0	Junpei Hamada	TKO (punches)	Deep: CMA Festival 2	July 23, 2007	1	3:56	Tokyo, Japan	
Win	4–0	Chang Seob Lee	TKO (punches)	Super Sambo Festival	June 24, 2007	3	4:56	Gyeongju, South Korea	
Win	3–0	Yun Seob Kwak	TKO (punches)	WXF: North Jeolla MMA Championships	June 2, 2007	2	2:35	North Jeolla, South Korea	
Win	2–0	Dool Hee Lee	TKO (punches)	WXF: North Jeolla MMA Championships	June 2, 2007	1	1:36	North Jeolla, South Korea	
Win	1–0	Hyung Kyo Lee	Submission (triangle choke)	WXF: North Jeolla MMA Championships	June 2, 2007	1	1:40	North Jeolla, South Korea	
