= UFC 102 =

UFC mixed martial arts event in 2009

UFC 102: Couture vs. Nogueira
- The poster for UFC 102: Couture vs. Nogueira
- Promotion: Ultimate Fighting Championship
- Date: August 29, 2009
- Venue: Rose Garden
- City: Portland, Oregon
- Attendance: 16,088
- Total gate: $1,920,000
- Buyrate: 435,000

Event chronology
UFC 101: Declaration	UFC 102: Couture vs. Nogueira	UFC Fight Night: Diaz vs. Guillard

UFC 102: Couture vs. Nogueira was a mixed martial arts pay-per-view event held by the Ultimate Fighting Championship (UFC) on August 29, 2009, at the Rose Garden in Portland, Oregon. It featured former five-time UFC champion and UFC Hall of Famer Randy Couture, facing off against former PRIDE FC Heavyweight Champion and former Interim UFC Heavyweight Champion, Antônio Rodrigo Nogueira.

== Background ==
Randy Couture was originally offered a title defense against Antônio Rodrigo Nogueira at UFC 81, however turned the fight down after his resignation from the UFC in October 2007. While Couture and the UFC sorted out their legal issues, Nogueira defeated Tim Sylvia for the Interim UFC Heavyweight Championship becoming the first fighter to hold both PRIDE and UFC title belts. Nogueira was then set to coach against Frank Mir on the eighth season of The Ultimate Fighter with the two facing off for the Interim Championship after the season aired.

Eventually Couture and the UFC reconciled and it was announced that he would return to the Octagon to defend his title against Brock Lesnar at UFC 91. Neither Couture or Nogueira were successful in their defense efforts and then faced each other in what amounted to a "losers bracket" of the UFC's mini heavyweight tournament.

A previously announced bout between Kyle Kingsbury and Razak Al-Hassan was moved to UFC 104 in Los Angeles, California on October 24, 2009. Matt Hamill pulled out of a bout with Brandon Vera due to injury. Krzysztof Soszynski took his place.

A knee injury forced James Irvin out of his bout with Wilson Gouveia. He was replaced by Ed Herman. On August 7, 2009 it was reported that Gouveia was also off the card due to a back injury. Marcus Aurélio replaced an injured Matt Veach.

This was the UFC's first event in Oregon.

== Results ==
Main card
Weight class				Method	Round	Time	Notes
Heavyweight	Antônio Rodrigo Nogueira	def	Randy Couture	Decision (unanimous) (30–27, 30–27, 29–28)	3	5:00
Light Heavyweight	Thiago Silva	def	Keith Jardine	KO (punches)	1	1:35
Middleweight	Jake Rosholt	def	Chris Leben	Technical Submission (arm-triangle choke)	3	1:30
Middleweight	Nate Marquardt	def	Demian Maia	KO (punch)	1	0:21
Light Heavyweight	Brandon Vera	def	Krzysztof Soszynski	Decision (unanimous) (30–27, 30–27, 30–27)	3	5:00
Preliminary card
Middleweight	Aaron Simpson	def	Ed Herman	TKO (knee injury)	2	0:17
Heavyweight	Gabriel Gonzaga	def	Chris Tuchscherer	TKO (punches)	1	2:27
Heavyweight	Mike Russow	def	Justin McCully	Decision (unanimous) (29–28, 30–26, 30–27)	3	5:00
Heavyweight	Todd Duffee	def	Tim Hague	KO (punches)	1	0:07
Middleweight	Mark Muñoz	def	Nick Catone	Decision (split) (28–29, 30–27, 29–28)	3	5:00
Lightweight	Evan Dunham	def	Marcus Aurelio	Decision (split) (28–29, 29–28, 30–27)	3	5:00

== Bonus awards ==
The following fighters received $60,000 bonuses.

- Fight of the Night: Randy Couture vs. Antônio Rodrigo Nogueira
- Knockout of the Night: Nate Marquardt
- Submission of the Night: Jake Rosholt

== Reported payout ==
The following is the reported payout to the fighters as reported to the Oregon State Athletic Commission. It does not include sponsor money or "locker room" bonuses often given by the UFC.

- Antônio Rodrigo Nogueira: ($400,000 includes $150,000 win bonus) def. Randy Couture: ($250,000)
- Thiago Silva: ($58,000 includes $29,000 win bonus) def. Keith Jardine: ($55,000)
- Jake Rosholt: ($26,000 includes $13,000 win bonus) def. Chris Leben: ($30,000)
- Nate Marquardt: ($80,000 includes $40,000 win bonus) def. Demian Maia ($28,000)
- Brandon Vera: ($70,000 includes $35,000 win bonus) def. Krzystzof Soszynski: ($8,000)
- Aaron Simpson: ($18,000 includes $9,000 win bonus) def. Ed Herman: ($24,000)
- Gabriel Gonzaga: ($120,000 includes $60,000 win bonus) def. Chris Tuchscherer: ($10,000)
- Mike Russow: ($20,000 includes $10,000 win bonus) def. Justin McCully: ($15,000)
- Todd Duffee: ($10,000 includes $5,000 win bonus) def. Tim Hague: ($7,000)
- Mark Muñoz: ($24,000 includes $12,000 win bonus) def. Nick Catone: ($5,000)
- Evan Dunham: ($14,000 includes $7,000 win bonus) def. Marcus Aurélio: ($13,000)

== See also ==
- Ultimate Fighting Championship
- List of UFC champions
- List of UFC events
- 2009 in UFC
