= Aaron Simpson (fighter) =

American sport wrestler and martial artist

- Born: July 20, 1974 (age 52); Gunnison, Colorado, United States
- Other names: A-Train
- Height: 6 ft 0 in (1.83 m)
- Weight: 171 lb (78 kg; 12.2 st)
- Division: Middleweight; Welterweight
- Reach: 73 in (190 cm)
- Stance: Orthodox
- Fighting out of: Phoenix, Arizona, United States
- Team: Power MMA Team
- Rank: Brown belt in Brazilian Jiu-Jitsu under Matt Waltz, Waltz Training Facility (WTF)
- Wrestling: NCAA Division I Wrestling
- Years active: 2000; 2007-2013

Mixed martial arts record
- Total: 17
- Wins: 12
- By knockout: 6
- By submission: 1
- By decision: 5
- Losses: 5
- By knockout: 3
- By decision: 2

Other information
- University: Arizona State University
- Notable school: Antelope Union High School
- Mixed martial arts record from Sherdog

Aaron Michael Simpson (born July 20, 1974) is an American mixed martial artist. A professional competitor from 2000 until 2013, he is perhaps best known for his 11-fight stint with the UFC, but also fought for the pre-Zuffa owned WEC and the World Series of Fighting.

== Background ==
Simpson was born in Gunnison, Colorado and grew up in Wellton, Arizona, where he attended Antelope Union High School. In high school he was a standout wrestler, compiling an amazing 142–1 record, and earned four state wrestling championships before going to compete in the sport for Arizona State University originally as a walk on before earning his scholarship. He compiled 110 wins and earned NCAA All-American status in 1996 and 1998 and then became an assistant coach for ASU and spent nine years there in that position. Simpson then worked as an assistant coach at California Polytechnic State University.

== Mixed martial arts ==
=== World Extreme Cagefighting ===
Simpson made his WEC debut against accomplished grappler David Avellan at WEC 36. Simpson won in the first round with a highlight-reel KO.

=== Ultimate Fighting Championship ===
Simpson was part of the transfer of Light Heavyweight and Middleweight fighters in the WEC to the UFC. He made his debut at UFC Fight Night 18 by defeating Tim McKenzie via TKO in the first round.

He was set to have his second fight against Dan Miller on September 16, 2009, at UFC Fight Night 19. Instead the fight was moved to UFC 102 where he fought Ed Herman. Simpson won by technical knockout when Herman went down with a knee injury in the second round.

Simpson faced Tom Lawlor on January 11, 2010, at UFC Fight Night 20, defeating him via controversial split decision.

Simpson was expected to face Chris Leben at UFC 114, but the bout took place instead on June 19, 2010, at The Ultimate Fighter: Team Liddell vs. Team Ortiz Finale. Simpson lost the fight via TKO at 4:17 of round 2. Simpson started out strong, using his wrestling to bring the heavier hitting Leben down multiple times. In the second round, Simpson came out gassed and ate multiple shots against the cage before turning and running away, falling against the cage, forcing the referee to save him.

Simpson was expected to face David Branch on September 15, 2010, at UFC Fight Night 22, but was forced to pull out of the bout with a staph infection.

Simpson faced Mark Muñoz on November 20, 2010, at UFC 123. He lost the fight via unanimous decision.

Simpson returned to winning by defeating Mario Miranda on March 26, 2011, at UFC Fight Night 24. Simpson dominated the fight by controlling Miranda on the ground en route to a unanimous decision victory. The judges scored the fight (30–27, 30–27, 30–26).

Simpson was expected to face returning UFC veteran Jason Miller on July 2, 2011, at UFC 132. However, on May 27, 2011, it was revealed that Miller would be one of the coaches of The Ultimate Fighter Season 14, opposite to Michael Bisping and had been pulled from the bout, while Simpson faced Brad Tavares. Simpson won via unanimous decision.

Simpson was expected to face Nick Catone on October 8, 2011, at UFC 136. However, Catone was forced out of the bout after tearing an Achilles tendon, and replaced by Eric Schafer, who he defeated by unanimous decision.

Simpson faced Ronny Markes on February 15, 2012, at UFC on Fuel TV 1. Markes defeated Simpson via split decision.

Following his split decision loss to Markes, Simpson confirmed he would drop down to the Welterweight division.

Simpson was expected to face Jon Fitch on July 11, 2012, at UFC on Fuel TV: Munoz vs. Weidman. However, Fitch pulled out of the bout citing a knee injury and was replaced by returning veteran Kenny Robertson. Simpson won a unanimous decision over Robertson.

Simpson fought Mike Pierce on October 5, 2012, at UFC on FX 5. After nearly finishing Pierce on two occasions in the first round, Simpson was knocked out 29 seconds into the second round. After the loss, the UFC chose not to renew Simpson's contract.

=== World Series of Fighting ===
Following his UFC release, Simpson signed with the new MMA company World Series of Fighting. He fought Josh Burkman at World Series of Fighting 2 on March 23, 2013. He lost his debut via TKO in the first round.

== Personal life ==
Simpson and his wife Kendra Sirignano have twins, a boy named Domenico and a girl named Mia, who were born in June 2008 via a surrogate, Simpson's mother-in-law. The couple also adopted a 16-year-old girl named Claire. Simpson and Sirignano also competed individually on an episode of American Gladiators Season Two against another married couple. Simpson and his wife are vegetarians. "I read a book called ‘Eating Animals’ that changed my thoughts,” he said. “And I’m an animal lover. I couldn’t justify what I was eating any more by the way meat is factory produced now and full of hormones, the way the animals are killed, it really turns me off."

== Championships and accomplishments ==
=== Collegiate wrestling ===
- National Collegiate Athletic Association
  - NCAA Division I All-American out of Arizona State University (1996, 1998)
  - NCAA Division I 177 lb: 4th place out of Arizona State University (1998)
  - NCAA Division I 177 lb: 8th place out of Arizona State University (1996)
  - Pac-10 Conference 177 lb: Champion out of Arizona State University (1997–98)

=== Mixed martial arts ===
- Ultimate Fighting Championship
  - Fight of the Night (One time) vs. Tom Lawlor
  - Knockout of the Night (One time) vs. Tim McKenzie
  - UFC.com Awards
    - 2009: Ranked #3 Newcomer of the Year
    - 2010: Ranked #8 Fight of the Year vs. Mark Munoz

== Mixed martial arts record ==
Professional record breakdown
17 matches	12 wins	5 losses
By knockout	6	3
By submission	1	0
By decision	5	2

Res.	Record	Opponent	Method	Event	Date	Round	Time	Location	Notes
Loss	12–5	Joshua Burkman	KO (knee and punches)	World Series of Fighting 2	March 23, 2013	1	3:04	Atlantic City, New Jersey, United States	
Loss	12–4	Mike Pierce	KO (punch)	UFC on FX: Browne vs. Bigfoot	October 5, 2012	2	0:29	Minneapolis, Minnesota, United States	
Win	12–3	Kenny Robertson	Decision (unanimous)	UFC on Fuel TV: Munoz vs. Weidman	July 11, 2012	3	5:00	San Jose, California, United States	Welterweight debut.
Loss	11–3	Ronny Markes	Decision (split)	UFC on Fuel TV: Sanchez vs. Ellenberger	February 15, 2012	3	5:00	Omaha, Nebraska, United States	
Win	11–2	Eric Schafer	Decision (unanimous)	UFC 136	October 8, 2011	3	5:00	Houston, Texas, United States	
Win	10–2	Brad Tavares	Decision (unanimous)	UFC 132	July 2, 2011	3	5:00	Las Vegas, Nevada, United States	
Win	9–2	Mario Miranda	Decision (unanimous)	UFC Fight Night: Nogueira vs. Davis	March 26, 2011	3	5:00	Seattle, Washington, United States	
Loss	8–2	Mark Muñoz	Decision (unanimous)	UFC 123	November 20, 2010	3	5:00	Auburn Hills, Michigan, United States	
Loss	8–1	Chris Leben	TKO (punches)	The Ultimate Fighter: Team Liddell vs. Team Ortiz Finale	June 19, 2010	2	4:17	Las Vegas, Nevada, United States	
Win	8–0	Tom Lawlor	Decision (split)	UFC Fight Night: Maynard vs. Diaz	January 11, 2010	3	5:00	Fairfax, Virginia, United States	Fight of the Night.
Win	7–0	Ed Herman	TKO (knee injury)	UFC 102	August 29, 2009	2	0:17	Portland, Oregon, United States	
Win	6–0	Tim McKenzie	TKO (punches)	UFC Fight Night: Condit vs. Kampmann	April 1, 2009	1	1:40	Nashville, Tennessee, United States	Knockout of the Night.
Win	5–0	David Avellan	KO (punch)	WEC 36: Faber vs. Brown	November 5, 2008	1	0:18	Hollywood, Florida, United States	
Win	4–0	Travis Degraw	TKO (punches)	Full Moon Fighting 2	May 31, 2008	3	3:22	Rocky Point, Mexico	
Win	3–0	Scott Dingman	TKO (punches)	Tuff-N-Uff: Thompson vs. Troyer	February 8, 2008	1	2:40	Las Vegas, Nevada, United States	
Win	2–0	Tim Coulson	TKO (punches)	Proving Grounds 2	October 5, 2007	1	3:44	Cayman Islands	
Win	1–0	Billy Onlewski	Submission (rear-naked choke)	Arizona Cage Combat	April 16, 2000	1	4:02	Payson, Arizona, United States	
