= UFC Fight Night: Condit vs. Kampmann =

UFC mixed martial arts event in 2009

- The poster for UFC Fight Night: Condit vs. Kampmann
- Promotion: Ultimate Fighting Championship
- Date: April 1, 2009
- Venue: Sommet Center
- City: Nashville, Tennessee
- Attendance: 10,267
- Total gate: $626,077

Event chronology
UFC 96: Jackson vs. Jardine	UFC Fight Night: Condit vs. Kampmann	UFC 97: Redemption

UFC Fight Night: Condit vs. Kampmann (also known as UFC Fight Night 18) was a mixed martial arts event held by the Ultimate Fighting Championship (UFC) on April 1, 2009.

== Background ==
The event was broadcast on Spike TV and served as a lead in to the premiere of The Ultimate Fighter: United States vs. United Kingdom.

This event was the UFC's first event in the state of Tennessee and it set the record in terms of attendance to date for both an MMA event in the state and a UFC Fight Night show.

The main event featured the debut of former WEC Welterweight Champion Carlos Condit – riding an eight fight win streak – in the main event against Martin Kampmann. Kampmann won the fight via split decision. However, the fight was close enough that FightMetric ruled the bout a draw.

The event drew a total of 1.9 million viewers.

== Results ==
Main card (Spike TV)
Weight class				Method	Round	Time	Notes
Welterweight	Martin Kampmann	def.	Carlos Condit	Decision (split) (29–28, 28–29, 29–28)	3	5:00
Light Heavyweight	Ryan Bader	def.	Carmelo Marrero	Decision (unanimous) (30–27, 30–27, 30–27)	3	5:00
Lightweight	Tyson Griffin	def.	Rafael dos Anjos	Decision (unanimous) (30–27, 30–27, 30–27)	3	5:00
Lightweight	Cole Miller	def.	Junie Browning	Submission (guillotine choke)	1	1:58
Preliminary card
Catchweight (158 lb)	Gleison Tibau	def.	Jeremy Stephens	Decision (unanimous) (30–27, 30–27, 29–28)	3	5:00
Middleweight	Ricardo Almeida	def.	Matt Horwich	Decision (unanimous) (30–27, 30–27, 30–27)	3	5:00
Welterweight	Brock Larson	def.	Jesse Sanders	Submission (rear-naked choke)	1	2:01
Middleweight	Tim Credeur	def.	Nick Catone	Submission (guillotine choke)	2	3:45
Middleweight	Jorge Rivera	def.	Nissen Osterneck	Decision (split) (29–28, 28–29, 29–28)	3	5:00
Middleweight	Rob Kimmons	def.	Joe Vedepo	Technical Submission (guillotine choke)	1	1:54
Middleweight	Aaron Simpson	def.	Tim McKenzie	TKO (punches)	1	1:40

== Bonus awards ==
The following fighters received $30,000 bonuses.

- Fight of the Night: Tyson Griffin vs. Rafael dos Anjos
- Knockout of the Night: Aaron Simpson
- Submission of the Night: Rob Kimmons

== See also ==
- Ultimate Fighting Championship
- List of UFC champions
- List of UFC events
- 2009 in UFC
