= Wilson Gouveia =

Brazilian mixed martial arts fighter

- Born: October 3, 1978 (age 48); Fortaleza Ceará, Brazil
- Height: 6 ft 2 in (1.88 m)
- Weight: 219 lb (99 kg; 15.6 st)
- Division: Heavyweight; Light Heavyweight; Middleweight
- Reach: 76 in (190 cm)
- Fighting out of: Coconut Creek, Florida, United States
- Team: American Top Team
- Rank: 4th degree black belt in Brazilian Jiu-Jitsu
- Years active: 2001–2013

Mixed martial arts record
- Total: 23
- Wins: 15
- By knockout: 7
- By submission: 7
- By decision: 1
- Losses: 8
- By knockout: 6
- By decision: 2

Other information
- Mixed martial arts record from Sherdog

Wilson Gouveia (born October 3, 1978) is a retired Brazilian mixed martial artist. Gouveia formerly fought in the UFC. He is a 4th degree black belt in Brazilian Jiu Jitsu and is a member of American Top Team.

== Mixed martial arts career ==
Gouveia hails from Fortaleza, Brazil, and fights out of Coconut Creek, Florida. He defeated Wes Combs at UFC 62, Seth Petruzelli at UFC Fight Night 9 and Carmelo Marrero at UFC 71. In his UFC debut he lost to Keith Jardine by a unanimous decision at The Ultimate Fighter 3 Finale. He was also scheduled to fight Alessio Sakara at UFC 65 but Gouveia withdrew from the card. He was next scheduled to fight Jason Lambert at UFC 76 but had to withdraw due to a broken nose. The fight was rescheduled for UFC 80, where Wilson Gouveia KO'd Lambert by a devastating left hook. Wilson Gouveia was then on a 4-win streak in the UFC, which was ended by Goran Reljic at UFC 84 when Reljic TKO'd Gouveia in the second round, the fight won "Fight of the night award". Gouveia recently got back on the winning track when he Submitted both Ryan Jensen due to an armbar, and Jason MacDonald due to elbows on the main card on Spike's Ultimate Fighter 8 finale. Wilson lost to Nate Marquardt at UFC 95 via TKO due to strikes.

Gouveia was scheduled to fight James Irvin on August 29, 2009, at UFC 102. However, Irvin was not able to fight due to a knee injury and was replaced by Ed Herman. Wilson was then forced out with a back injury and the bout was scrapped altogether.

Gouveia's latest fight was against Alan Belcher on December 12, 2009, at UFC 107 at a catchweight of 195 lb, which he lost by TKO in the first round. However, the bout was awarded Fight of the Night honors.

Gouveia was released from the UFC following his loss to Belcher. He left the company with a 6–4 record.

=== Post-UFC ===
Wilson was controlled and defeated by Ryan Jimmo on May 7, 2010, at MFC 25 via unanimous decision (30–27, 30–26, 30–26).

After a long layoff, Wilson returned to action against Dwayne Lewis. Throughout the fight, Gouveia attacked the lower part of Lewis' leg with kicks causing Lewis to collapse. Gouveia attempted to end it on the ground with a choke and a kimura before finishing the fight with punches.

== Personal life ==
Wilson and his wife Fernanda have 4 sons named Wilson Jr, William, Wellison and Wesley Gouveia. Wilson also owns an American Top Team gym, ATT West Pines.

== Championships and accomplishments ==
- Ultimate Fighting Championship
  - Fight of the Night (Three times) vs. Seth Petruzelli, Goran Reljić and Alan Belcher
  - Knockout of the Night (One time) vs. Jason Lambert
  - Submission of the Night (One time) vs. Ryan Jensen
  - UFC.com Awards
    - 2008: Ranked #9 Fight of the Year vs. Goran Reljić

== Mixed martial arts record ==
Professional record breakdown
23 matches	15 wins	8 losses
By knockout	7	6
By submission	7	0
By decision	1	2

Res.	Record	Opponent	Method	Event	Date	Round	Time	Location	Notes
Win	15–8	Wanderson Lima	TKO (punches)	Combate Brasil 2: Desafio	July 28, 2013	2	4:16	Fortaleza, Ceará, Brazil	Light Heavyweight bout.
Win	14–8	Kyle Keeney	TKO (leg kick and punches)	Fight Time 9: MMA Explosion	April 27, 2012	1	0:50	Ft. Lauderdale, FL, United States	Heavyweight debut.
Win	13–8	Dwayne Lewis	TKO (punches)	MFC 32	January 27, 2012	2	3:19	Edmonton, Alberta, Canada	
Loss	12–8	Ryan Jimmo	Decision (unanimous)	MFC 25	May 7, 2010	3	5:00	Edmonton, Alberta, Canada	Catchweight (208 lb) bout.
Loss	12–7	Alan Belcher	TKO (punches)	UFC 107	December 12, 2009	1	3:03	Memphis, Tennessee, United States	Catchweight (195 lb) bout; Fight of the Night.
Loss	12–6	Nate Marquardt	TKO (knee and punches)	UFC 95	Feb 21, 2009	3	3:10	London, England, United Kingdom	
Win	12–5	Jason MacDonald	TKO (submission to strikes)	The Ultimate Fighter: Team Nogueira vs Team Mir Finale	Dec 13, 2008	1	2:18	Las Vegas, Nevada, United States	Catchweight (189 lb) bout.
Win	11–5	Ryan Jensen	Submission (armbar)	UFC Fight Night 15	Sep 17, 2008	2	2:04	Omaha, Nebraska, United States	Submission of the Night.
Loss	10–5	Goran Reljic	TKO (punches)	UFC 84	May 24, 2008	2	3:15	Nevada, United States	Middleweight debut; Fight of the Night.
Win	10–4	Jason Lambert	KO (punch)	UFC 80	January 19, 2008	2	0:37	Newcastle upon Tyne, England	Knockout of the Night.
Win	9–4	Carmelo Marrero	Submission (guillotine choke)	UFC 71	May 26, 2007	1	3:06	Las Vegas, Nevada, United States	
Win	8–4	Seth Petruzelli	Submission (guillotine choke)	UFC Fight Night: Stevenson vs. Guillard	April 5, 2007	2	0:39	Nevada, United States	Fight of the Night.
Win	7–4	Wes Combs	Submission (rear-naked choke)	UFC 62: Liddell vs. Sobral	August 26, 2006	1	3:23	Las Vegas, Nevada, United States	
Loss	6–4	Keith Jardine	Decision (unanimous)	The Ultimate Fighter: Team Ortiz vs. Team Shamrock Finale	June 24, 2006	3	5:00	Las Vegas, Nevada, United States	
Win	6–3	Kazuhiro Hamanaka	KO (punches)	Euphoria: USA vs. Japan	November 5, 2005	1	0:39	Atlantic City, New Jersey, United States	
Win	5–3	Mike Delaney	TKO (submission to punches)	FCC 15: Freestyle Combat Challenge 15	June 12, 2004	1	3:23	Racine, Wisconsin, United States	
Loss	4–3	Rory Singer	KO (knee)	KOTC 32: Bringing Heat	January 24, 2004	2	4:55	Miami, Florida, United States	
Win	4–2	Ron Faircloth	Decision (unanimous)	AFC 6: Absolute Fighting Championships 6	December 6, 2003	3	5:00	Fort Lauderdale, Florida, United States	
Loss	3–2	Ron Faircloth	TKO (corner stoppage)	AFC 4: Absolute Fighting Championships 4	July 19, 2003	1	5:00	Fort Lauderdale, Florida, United States	
Loss	3–1	Hirotaka Yokoi	TKO (punches)	HOOKnSHOOT: Absolute Fighting Championships 2	March 28, 2003	3	2:26	Fort Lauderdale, Florida, United States	
Win	3–0	Jon Fitch	KO (knee)	HOOKnSHOOT: Absolute Fighting Championships 1	December 13, 2002	1	3:38	Fort Lauderdale, Florida, United States	
Win	2–0	Ahron Davis	KO (punch)	WEFC 1: Bring It On	June 29, 2002	1	0:22	Marietta, Georgia, United States	
Win	1–0	Ray Casias	Submission (armbar)	HOOKnSHOOT: Kings 1	November 17, 2001	1	2:59	Evansville, Indiana, United States	

== See also ==
- List of male mixed martial artists
