= UFC 65 =

UFC mixed martial arts event in 2006

UFC 65: Bad Intentions
- The poster for UFC 65: Bad Intentions
- Promotion: Ultimate Fighting Championship
- Date: November 18, 2006
- Venue: ARCO Arena
- City: Sacramento, California
- Attendance: 14,666 (12,362 paid)
- Total gate: $2,138,020
- Buyrate: 500,000
- Total purse: $457,000 (disclosed)

Event chronology
| The Ultimate Fighter: The Comeback Finale | UFC 65: Bad Intentions | UFC Fight Night: Sanchez vs. Riggs |

UFC 65: Bad Intentions was a mixed martial arts competition held by the Ultimate Fighting Championship on November 18, 2006, at the ARCO Arena in Sacramento, California – the UFC's first show at this venue. It was broadcast live on pay-per-view in the United States and Canada, and was later released on DVD.

== Background ==
The card featured the anticipated rematch between Matt Hughes and Georges St-Pierre for the UFC Welterweight Championship – a fight originally scheduled for UFC 63. UFC 65 also featured a heavyweight title bout between Undisputed UFC Heavyweight Champion Tim Sylvia and Jeff Monson.

This event marked one of the few occasions that a UFC card with two non-interim title fights featured the lower weight class' title fight as the card's main event. The UFC had stated afterwards that all cards with two title fights will always have the heavier weight class' title fight as the main event. UFC 169 on February 1, 2014, would later feature two non-interim title fights, with the lighter weight class as main event.

UFC 65's original slated main event was a championship superfight with UFC Light Heavyweight Champion Chuck Liddell defending his title against PRIDE Middleweight Champion Wanderlei Silva, a matchup UFC President Dana White announced during UFC 61 on July 8, 2006. Since then, the matchup appeared to have been postponed or cancelled because Tito Ortiz had been guaranteed a title shot at UFC 66, which was too close to UFC 65, as White stated in several interviews.

The Hughes vs. St-Pierre main event was long awaited. It was first officially announced to happen at UFC 63 during the July 17, 2006 edition of The Hot List on ESPNEWS. The fight was announced before, without a date, at a press conference in Toronto, Ontario, Canada on April 7, 2006, and the matchup was alluded to—but not officially announced—during the pay-per-view broadcast of UFC 58.

== Results ==
Main Card
| Weight class | | | | Method | Round | Time | Notes |
|---|---|---|---|---|---|---|---|
| Welterweight | Georges St-Pierre | def. | Matt Hughes (c) | TKO (head kick and punches) | 2 | 1:25 | (Note: For the UFC Welterweight Championship) |
| Heavyweight | Tim Sylvia (c) | def. | Jeff Monson | Decision (unanimous) (50–45, 49–46, 49–46) | 5 | 5:00 | (Note: For the UFC Heavyweight Championship.) |
| Light Heavyweight | Drew McFedries | def. | Alessio Sakara | TKO (punches) | 1 | 4:07 | (Note: McFedries was a late replacement for Wilson Gouveia.) |
| Heavyweight | Brandon Vera | def. | Frank Mir | TKO (punches) | 1 | 1:09 |
| Lightweight | Joe Stevenson | def. | Dokonjonosuke Mishima | Submission (guillotine choke) | 1 | 2:07 |
Preliminary Card
| Welterweight | Nick Diaz | def. | Gleison Tibau | TKO (punches) | 2 | 2:27 |
| Heavyweight | Antoni Hardonk | def. | Sherman Pendergarst | KO (punch and leg kick) | 1 | 3:15 | (Note: Pendergarst was a late replacement for Brad Imes. This bout aired last on the PPV broadcast following the Hughes vs. St-Pierre fight.) |
| Light Heavyweight | James Irvin | def. | Hector Ramirez | TKO (punch and elbows) | 2 | 2:36 | (Note: This bout aired on the PPV broadcast following the Sakara vs. McFedries fight.) |
| Heavyweight | Jake O'Brien | def. | Josh Schockman | Decision (unanimous) (30–27, 30–27, 30–27) | 3 | 5:00 |

== Bonus Awards ==
- Fight of the Night: James Irvin vs. Hector Ramirez
- Knockout of the Night: Georges St-Pierre
- Submission of the Night: Joe Stevenson

== See also ==
- Ultimate Fighting Championship
- List of UFC champions
- List of UFC events
- 2006 in UFC
