= 2006 in UFC =

Mixed martial arts events

Information
- First date: January 16, 2006
- Last date: December 30, 2006

Events
- Total events: 18
- UFC: 10
- UFC Fight Night: 6
- TUF Finale events: 2

Fights
- Total fights: 158
- Title fights: 11

Chronology
2005 in UFC	2006 in UFC	2007 in UFC

The year 2006 was the 14th year in the history of the Ultimate Fighting Championship (UFC), a mixed martial arts promotion based in the United States. In 2006 the UFC held 18 events beginning with, UFC Fight Night 3.

== 2006 UFC.com awards ==
2006 UFC.COM Awards
No	The Submissions	The Knockouts	The Fights
1	Josh Neer defeats Melvin Guillard; UFC Ultimate Fight Night 3	Anderson Silva defeats Rich Franklin 1 UFC 64	Diego Sanchez defeats Karo Parisyan; UFC Fight Night: Sanchez vs. Parisyan
2	Travis Lutter defeats Patrick Côté; The Ultimate Fighter 4 Finale	Scott Smith defeats Pete Sell; The Ultimate Fighter 4 Finale	Georges St-Pierre defeats B.J. Penn 1 UFC 58
3	Kenny Florian defeats Sam Stout; The Ultimate Fighter 6 Finale	Tim Sylvia defeats Andrei Arlovski 1 UFC 59	Kendall Grove defeats Ed Herman; The Ultimate Fighter 3 Finale
4	Jason MacDonald defeats Chris Leben; UFC 66	Georges St-Pierre defeats Matt Hughes 2 UFC 65	Tim Sylvia defeats Andrei Arlovski 1 UFC 59
5	Dean Lister defeats Alessio Sakara; UFC 60	Chuck Liddell defeats Randy Couture 3 UFC 57	Tito Ortiz defeats Forrest Griffin 1 UFC 59
6	Hermes França defeats Jamie Varner; UFC 62	Anderson Silva defeats Chris Leben; UFC Ultimate Fight Night 5	Scott Smith defeats Pete Sell; The Ultimate Fighter 4 Finale
7	Mark Hominick defeats Yves Edwards; UFC 58	Joe Lauzon defeats Jens Pulver; UFC 63	Matt Hughes defeats B.J. Penn 2 UFC 63
8	Dan Christison defeats Brad Imes; UFC Ultimate Fight Night 4	Duane Ludwig defeats Jonathan Goulet; UFC Ultimate Fight Night 3	Rich Franklin defeats David Loiseau; UFC 58
9	Rory Singer defeats Ross Pointon; The Ultimate Fighter 3 Finale	Diego Sanchez defeats Joe Riggs; UFC Fight Night: Sanchez vs. Riggs	Dan Christison defeats Brad Imes; UFC Ultimate Fight Night 4
10	Jason Von Flue defeats Alex Karalexis; UFC Ultimate Fight Night 3	Alan Belcher defeats Jorge Santiago at UFC Fight Night: Sanchez vs. Riggs (Tie); Keith Jardine defeats Forrest Griffin at UFC 66 (Tie)	Sam Stout defeats Spencer Fisher 1 at UFC 58 (Tie); Drew McFedries defeats Alessio Sakara at UFC 65 (Tie)
Ref			

== Debut UFC fighters ==
The following fighters fought their first UFC fight in 2006:

ISO	Fighter	Division
(United States)	Alan Belcher	Middleweight
(Brazil)	Anderson Silva	Middleweight
(Australia)	Anthony Perosh	Light Heavyweight
(United States)	Anthony Torres	Welterweight
(Netherlands)	Antoni Hardonk	Heavyweight
(Brazil)	Assuério Silva	Heavyweight
(United States)	Carmelo Marrero	Heavyweight
(France)	Cheick Kongo	Heavyweight
(United States)	Chris Price	Middleweight
(United States)	Christian Wellisch	Heavyweight
(United States)	Clay Guida	Lightweight
(United States)	Cory Walmsley	Welterweight
(United States)	Dan Christison	Heavyweight
(United States)	Dan Lauzon	Lightweight
(United States)	Danny Abbadi	Middleweight
(United States)	David Heath	Light Heavyweight
(United States)	David Lee	Lightweight
(United States)	Dean Lister	Middleweight
(United States)	Derrick Noble	Welterweight
(Japan)	Dokonjonosuke Mishima	Lightweight
(United States)	Drew McFedries	Middleweight
(United States)	Dustin Hazelett	Welterweight
(United States)	Ed Herman	Middleweight
(United States)	Eddie Sanchez	Heavyweight
(United States)	Eric Schafer	Light Heavyweight
(United States)	Forrest Petz	Welterweight
(United States)	Gabe Ruediger	Lightweight

ISO	Fighter	Division
(United States)	Gilbert Aldana	Heavyweight
(Brazil)	Gleison Tibau	Welterweight
(Argentina)	Icho Larenas	Heavyweight
(United States)	Jake O'Brien	Heavyweight
(United States)	Jamie Varner	Lightweight
(United States)	Jason Dent	Lightweight
(United States)	Jason Lambert	Light Heavyweight
(Canada)	Jason MacDonald	Middleweight
(United States)	Jason Von Flue	Welterweight
(United States)	Jeff Joslin	Welterweight
(United States)	Jesse Forbes	Middleweight
(United States)	Joe Jordan	Lightweight
(United States)	Joe Lauzon	Lightweight
(Brazil)	Jorge Gurgel	Lightweight
(Brazil)	Jorge Santiago	Middleweight
(United States)	Josh Haynes	Middleweight
(United States)	Josh Schockman	Heavyweight
(Brazil)	Junior Assuncao	Lightweight
(United States)	Justin James	Lightweight
(United States)	Justin Levens	Middleweight
(Canada)	Kalib Starnes	Middleweight
(Japan)	Keita Nakamura	Welterweight
(United States)	Kendall Grove	Middleweight
(United States)	Kris Rotharmel	Lightweight
(France)	Kristof Midoux	Heavyweight
(Japan)	Kuniyoshi Hironaka	Lightweight
(United States)	Kurt Pellegrino	Lightweight

ISO	Fighter	Division
(United States)	Logan Clark	Middleweight
(United States)	Luigi Fioravanti	Welterweight
(United States)	Matt Hamill	Light Heavyweight
(United States)	Matt Wiman	Lightweight
(England)	Michael Bisping	Light Heavyweight
(United States)	Mike Nickels	Light Heavyweight
(United States)	Mike Whitehead	Light Heavyweight
(United States)	Pat Healy	Welterweight
(United States)	Rick Davis	Lightweight
(Canada)	Rob MacDonald	Light Heavyweight
(United States)	Roger Huerta	Lightweight
(United States)	Rory Singer	Middleweight
(England)	Ross Pointon	Middleweight
(Canada)	Sam Stout	Lightweight
(United States)	Scott Smith	Middleweight
(United States)	Seth Petruzelli	Light Heavyweight
(United States)	Sherman Pendergarst	Heavyweight
(United States)	Solomon Hutcherson	Middleweight
(Brazil)	Thales Leites	Middleweight
(United States)	Tom Murphy	Light Heavyweight
(United States)	Tyson Griffin	Lightweight
(Canada)	Victor Valimaki	Light Heavyweight
(United States)	Wes Combs	Light Heavyweight
(Brazil)	Wilson Gouveia	Light Heavyweight
(Japan)	Yuki Sasaki	Middleweight
(Japan)	Yushin Okami	Middleweight

== The Ultimate Fighter ==
Season	Finale	Division	Winner	Runner-up
TUF 3: Team Ortiz vs. Team Shamrock	Jun 24, 2006	Middleweight	Kendall Grove	Ed Herman
TUF 3: Team Ortiz vs. Team Shamrock	Jun 24, 2006	Light Heavyweight	Michael Bisping	Josh Haynes
TUF 4: The Comeback	Nov 11, 2006	Middleweight	Travis Lutter	Patrick Côté
TUF 4: The Comeback	Nov 11, 2006	Welterweight	Matt Serra	Chris Lytle

== Title fights ==
Title fights in 2006
Weight class				Method	Round	Time	Event	Notes
Light Heavyweight	Chuck Liddell (c)	def.	Randy Couture	KO (punch)	2	1:28	UFC 57: Liddell vs. Couture 3	(Note: For the UFC Light Heavyweight Championship Couture announced his retirement after the loss.)
Middleweight	Rich Franklin (c)	def.	David Loiseau	Decision (unanimous)	5	5:00	UFC 58: USA vs. Canada	(Note: For the UFC Middleweight Championship)
Heavyweight	Tim Sylvia	def.	Andrei Arlovski (c)	TKO (punches)	1	2:43	UFC 59: Reality Check	(Note: For the UFC Heavyweight Championship.)
Heavyweight	Tim Sylvia (c)	def.	Andrei Arlovski	Decision (unanimous)	5	5:00	UFC 61: Bitter Rivals	(Note: For the UFC Heavyweight Championship.)
Light Heavyweight	Chuck Liddell (c)	def.	Renato Sobral	TKO (Punches)	1	1:35	UFC 62: Liddell vs. Sobral	(Note: For the UFC Light Heavyweight Championship)
Welterweight	Matt Hughes (c)	def.	B.J. Penn	TKO (punches)	3	3:53	UFC 63: Hughes vs. Penn	(Note: For the UFC Welterweight Championship)
Lightweight	Sean Sherk	def.	Kenny Florian	Decision (unanimous)	5	5:00	UFC 64: Unstoppable	(Note: For the UFC Lightweight Championship)
Middleweight	Anderson Silva	def.	Rich Franklin (c)	KO (knee)	1	2:59	UFC 64: Unstoppable	(Note: For the UFC Middleweight Championship)
Heavyweight	Tim Sylvia (c)	def.	Jeff Monson	Decision (unanimous)	5	5:00	UFC 65: Bad Intentions	(Note: For the UFC Heavyweight Championship.)
Welterweight	Georges St. Pierre	def.	Matt Hughes (c)	TKO (head kick and punches)	2	1:25	UFC 65: Bad Intentions	(Note: For the UFC Welterweight Championship)
Light Heavyweight	Chuck Liddell (c)	def.	Tito Ortiz	TKO (punches)	3	3:59	UFC 66: Liddell vs. Ortiz	(Note: For the UFC Light Heavyweight Championship)

== Events list ==
#	Event	Date	Venue	Location	Attendance
083	UFC 66: Liddell vs. Ortiz	Dec 30, 2006	MGM Grand Garden Arena	Las Vegas, Nevada, U.S.	13,671
082	UFC Fight Night: Sanchez vs. Riggs	Dec 13, 2006	Marine Corps Air Station Miramar	San Diego, California, U.S.	
081	UFC 65: Bad Intentions	Nov 18, 2006	ARCO Arena	Sacramento, California, U.S.	14,666
080	The Ultimate Fighter: The Comeback Finale	Nov 11, 2006	Hard Rock Hotel and Casino	Las Vegas, Nevada, U.S.	
079	UFC 64: Unstoppable	Oct 14, 2006	Mandalay Bay Events Center	Las Vegas, Nevada, U.S.	
078	Ortiz vs. Shamrock 3: The Final Chapter	Oct 10, 2006	Seminole Hard Rock Hotel and Casino	Hollywood, Florida, U.S.	
077	UFC 63: Hughes vs. Penn	Sep 23, 2006	Arrowhead Pond of Anaheim	Anaheim, California, U.S.	12,604
076	UFC 62: Liddell vs. Sobral	Aug 26, 2006	Mandalay Bay Events Center	Las Vegas, Nevada, U.S.	
075	UFC Fight Night 6	Aug 17, 2006	Red Rock Resort Spa and Casino	Las Vegas, Nevada, U.S.	
074	UFC 61: Bitter Rivals	Jul 8, 2006	Mandalay Bay Events Center	Las Vegas, Nevada, U.S.	
073	UFC Fight Night 5	Jun 28, 2006	Hard Rock Hotel and Casino	Las Vegas, Nevada, U.S.	606
072	The Ultimate Fighter: Team Ortiz vs. Team Shamrock Finale	Jun 24, 2006	Hard Rock Hotel and Casino	Las Vegas, Nevada, U.S.	849
071	UFC 60: Hughes vs. Gracie	May 27, 2006	Staples Center	Los Angeles, U.S.	14,765
070	UFC 59: Reality Check	Apr 15, 2006	Arrowhead Pond of Anaheim	Anaheim, California, U.S.	13,814
069	UFC Fight Night 4	Apr 6, 2006	Hard Rock Hotel and Casino	Las Vegas, Nevada, U.S.	843
068	UFC 58: USA vs. Canada	Mar 4, 2006	Mandalay Bay Events Center	Las Vegas, Nevada, U.S.	9,569
067	UFC 57: Liddell vs. Couture 3	Feb 4, 2006	Mandalay Bay Events Center	Las Vegas, Nevada, U.S.	10,659
066	UFC Fight Night 3	Jan 16, 2006	Hard Rock Hotel and Casino	Las Vegas, Nevada, U.S.	1,008

== See also ==
- UFC
- List of UFC champions
- List of UFC events
