= UFC Ultimate Fight Night 3 =

UFC mixed martial arts event in 2006

Ultimate Fight Night 3
- The poster for Ultimate Fight Night 3
- Promotion: Ultimate Fighting Championship
- Date: January 16, 2006
- Venue: Hard Rock Hotel and Casino
- City: Las Vegas, Nevada
- Attendance: 1,008
- Total gate: $144,600

Event chronology
UFC 56: Full Force	Ultimate Fight Night 3	UFC 57: Liddell vs Couture 3

Ultimate Fight Night 3 was a mixed martial arts event held by the Ultimate Fighting Championship on January 16, 2006. The event took place at the Hard Rock Hotel and Casino in Las Vegas, Nevada, and was broadcast live on Spike TV in the United States and Canada. The main event between Tim Sylvia and Assuério Silva was touted as a match to determine the next contender for the UFC Heavyweight Championship, then held by Andrei Arlovski. The two-hour broadcast drew a 1.7 overall rating. The disclosed fighter payroll for Ultimate Fight Night 3 was $183,000.

During the broadcast, UFC President Dana White announced a bout between Matt Hughes and Royce Gracie, which later occurred at UFC 60.

== Results ==
Main Card
Weight class				Method	Round	Time	Notes
Heavyweight	Tim Sylvia	def.	Assuério Silva	Decision (unanimous) (30–27, 30–27, 29–28)	3	5:00
Light Heavyweight	Stephan Bonnar	def.	James Irvin	Submission (kimura)	1	4:30
Welterweight	Josh Burkman	def.	Drew Fickett	Submission (guillotine choke)	1	1:07
Middleweight	Chris Leben	def.	Jorge Rivera	TKO (punches)	1	1:44
Preliminary Card
Welterweight	Josh Neer	def.	Melvin Guillard	Submission (triangle choke)	1	4:20
Welterweight	Duane Ludwig	def.	Jonathan Goulet	KO (punch)	1	0:11	(Note: The UFC records the official bout time at 0:11. Dana White and UFC officials have admitted the actual KO time was 0:06. The NSAC cannot retroactively amend bout times)
Welterweight	Spencer Fisher	def.	Aaron Riley	TKO (doctor stoppage)	1	5:00
Welterweight	Jason Von Flue	def.	Alex Karalexis	Technical Submission (Von Flue choke)	3	1:17	(Note: This bout was not aired on the broadcast.)

== Bonus awards ==
This was the first time official bonuses were awarded at a UFC event:

- Fight of the Night: Melvin Guillard vs. Josh Neer

== Encyclopedia awards ==
The following fighters were honored in the October 2011 book titled UFC Encyclopedia.

- Knockout of the Night: Chris Leben
- Submission of the Night: Jason Von Flue

== Reported payouts ==
Tim Sylvia: $80,000

Stephan Bonnar: $24,000

Jason Von Flue: $10,000

Josh Burkman: $10,000

Chris Leben: $10,000

Duane Ludwig: $8,000

Assuerio Silva: $8,000

Spencer Fisher: $8,000

Drew Fickett: $6,000

James Irvin: $5,000

Jorge Rivera: $5,000

Alex Karalexis: $3,000

Aaron Riley: $3,000

Jonathan Goulet: $3,000

Disclosed Fighter Payroll: $183,000

== See also ==
- Ultimate Fighting Championship
- List of UFC champions
- List of UFC events
- 2006 in UFC
