= UFC 66 =

UFC mixed martial arts event in 2006

UFC 66: Liddell vs. Ortiz
- The poster for UFC 66: Liddell vs. Ortiz
- Promotion: Ultimate Fighting Championship
- Date: December 30, 2006
- Venue: MGM Grand Garden Arena
- City: Paradise, Nevada
- Attendance: 13,761 (12,191 paid)
- Total gate: $5,397,300
- Buyrate: 1,050,000
- Total purse: $767,000 (disclosed)

Event chronology
UFC Fight Night: Sanchez vs. Riggs	UFC 66: Liddell vs. Ortiz	UFC Fight Night: Evans vs. Salmon

UFC 66: Liddell vs. Ortiz was a mixed martial arts (MMA) pay-per-view event held by the Ultimate Fighting Championship on December 30, 2006 at the MGM Grand Garden Arena in the Las Vegas suburb of Paradise, Nevada.

== Background ==
UFC 66's main event was a championship fight with two of the UFC's biggest light heavyweight stars, Light Heavyweight Champion Chuck Liddell defending his title against former champion Tito Ortiz. This fight was first announced by Ortiz at the UFC 63 weigh-ins on September 22, 2006.

The co-main event saw Forrest Griffin take on "The Dean of Mean" Keith Jardine. The card also saw the return of former Heavyweight Champion Andrei Arlovski and The Ultimate Fighter 3 winner Michael Bisping's first bout in the UFC since winning that season. During the event, it was made official that Mirko "Cro Cop" Filipovic had signed a contract with the UFC, and would make his debut with the organization at UFC 67.

The event was the UFC's first show at MGM Grand Arena since UFC 56, and was nearly sold-out, producing the highest live gate revenue in North American mixed martial arts history, extending the previous record at UFC 57 by over $2,000,000 (USD). At the time, it was estimated to be the UFC's biggest pay-per-view success with just over 1 million buys.

The disclosed fighter payroll for the event was $767,000.

== Results ==
Main Card
Weight class				Method	Round	Time	Notes
Light Heavyweight	Chuck Liddell (c)	def.	Tito Ortiz	TKO (punches)	3	3:59	(Note: For the UFC Light Heavyweight Championship)
Light Heavyweight	Keith Jardine	def.	Forrest Griffin	TKO (punches)	1	4:41
Middleweight	Jason MacDonald	def.	Chris Leben	Submission (guillotine choke)	2	4:03
Heavyweight	Andrei Arlovski	def.	Márcio Cruz	KO (punches)	1	3:15
Light Heavyweight	Michael Bisping	def.	Eric Schafer	TKO (punches)	1	4:24
Preliminary Card
Welterweight	Thiago Alves	def.	Tony DeSouza	KO (knee)	2	1:10	(Note: This bout aired on the PPV broadcast following the Griffin vs. Jardine fight. After the fight Alves tested positive for spironolactone. He was fined $5,500 by the NSAC and suspended for eight months. Alves is the first fighter in Nevada to ever test positive for a diuretic.)
Heavyweight	Gabriel Gonzaga	def.	Carmelo Marrero	Submission (armbar)	1	3:22	(Note: This bout aired last on the PPV broadcast following the Liddell vs. Ortiz fight.)
Middleweight	Yushin Okami	def.	Rory Singer	TKO (submission to punches)	3	4:03
Heavyweight	Christian Wellisch	def.	Anthony Perosh	Decision (unanimous) (29–28, 29–27, 29–28)	3	5:00

== Bonus awards ==
- Fight of the Night: Chuck Liddell vs. Tito Ortiz
- Knockout of the Night: Keith Jardine
- Submission of the Night: Jason MacDonald

== Reported salaries ==
UFC 66 Fighters' Salaries:

- Chuck Liddell: $250,000 ($250,000 to fight; no win bonus)
- Tito Ortiz: $210,000 ($210,000 to fight; no win bonus)
- Andrei Arlovski: $145,000 ($90,000 to fight; $55,000 win bonus)
- Michael Bisping: $24,000 ($12,000 to fight; $12,000 win bonus)
- Thiago Alves: $22,000 ($11,000 to fight; $11,000 win bonus)
- Gabriel Gonzaga: $18,000 ($9,000 to fight; $9,000 win bonus)
- Forrest Griffin: $16,000 ($16,000 to fight; no win bonus)
- Yushin Okami: $16,000 ($8,000 to fight; $8,000 win bonus)
- Keith Jardine: $14,000 ($7,000 to fight; $7,000 win bonus)
- Jason MacDonald: $10,000 ($5,000 to fight; $5,000 win bonus)
- Chris Leben: $7,000 ($7,000 to fight; no win bonus)
- Tony DeSouza: $7,000 ($7,000 to fight; no win bonus)
- Christian Wellisch: $6,000 ($3,000 to fight; $3,000 win bonus)
- Marcio Cruz: $5,000 ($5,000 to fight; no win bonus)
- Carmelo Marrero: $5,000 ($5,000 to fight; no win bonus)
- Rory Singer: $5,000 ($5,000 to fight; no win bonus)
- Eric Schafer: $4,000 ($4,000 to fight; no win bonus)
- Anthony Perosh: $3,000 ($3,000 to fight; no win bonus)

== See also ==
- Ultimate Fighting Championship
- List of UFC champions
- List of UFC events
- 2006 in UFC
