= Alessio Sakara =

Italian kickboxer, boxer and mixed martial arts fighter

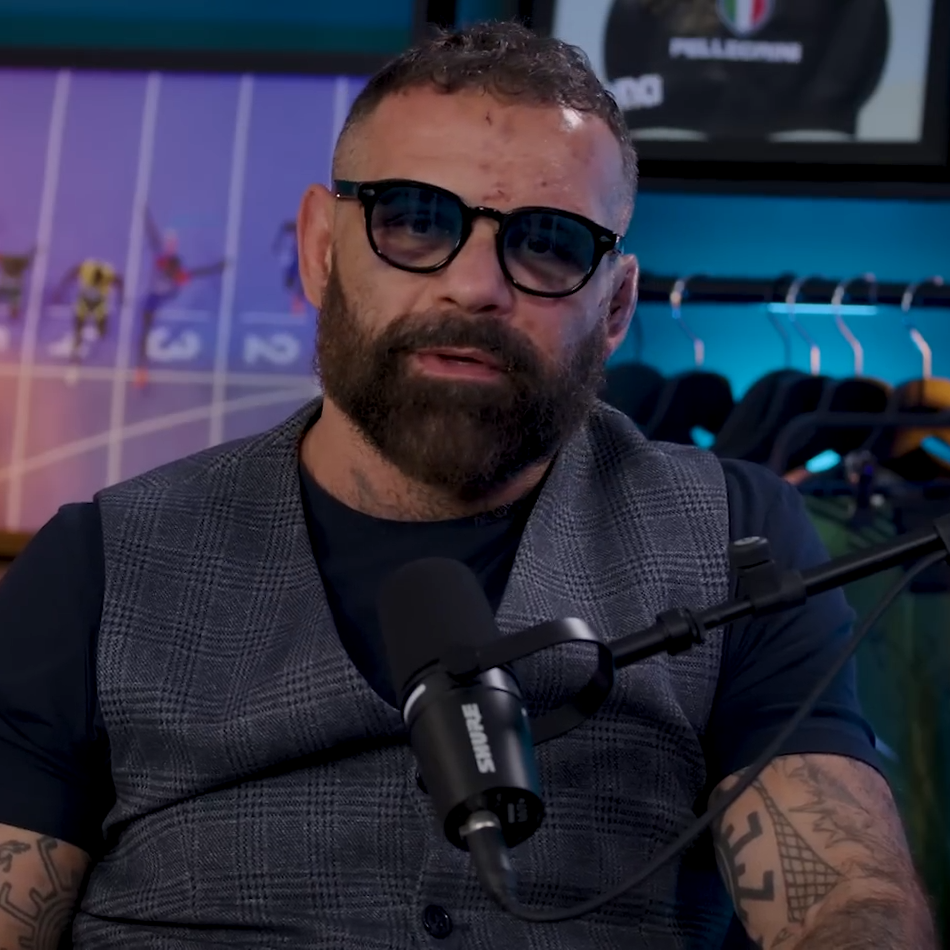
- Born: September 2, 1981 (age 45); Rome, Italy
- Other names: Legionarius
- Height: 1.85 m (6 ft 1 in)
- Weight: 93 kg (205 lb; 14 st 9 lb)
- Division: Middleweight (2008–2013, 2017–present); Light Heavyweight (2002–2008, 2014–2017)
- Reach: 183 cm (72.0 in)
- Style: Sanda, Boxing
- Fighting out of: Miami, Florida, United States
- Team: American Top Team (2007–present)
- Rank: Black belt in Brazilian Jiu-Jitsu under Marcus "Conan" Silveira
- Years active: 2002–present

Professional boxing record
- Total: 9
- Wins: 8
- By knockout: 6
- Losses: 1
- By knockout: 1

Mixed martial arts record
- Total: 37
- Wins: 22
- By knockout: 16
- By submission: 2
- By decision: 4
- Losses: 13
- By knockout: 6
- By submission: 3
- By decision: 3
- By disqualification: 1
- No contests: 2

Other information
- Boxing record from BoxRec
- Mixed martial arts record from Sherdog

Alessio Sakara (born September 2, 1981) is an Italian professional mixed martial artist, former professional boxer and Sanshou kickboxer who competed in the Light Heavyweight division. He currently is a bare-knuckle boxer for Bare Knuckle Fighting Championship where he is the current BKFC Cruiserweight Champion. A professional competitor since 2002, Sakara has also formerly competed for the UFC, Bellator MMA, Jungle Fight, Cage Warriors, and M-1 Global.

== Background ==
Born in Rome, Sakara began to compete in soccer at the age of five and was talented, playing the midfielder position. He began training in boxing at the age of 11. At the age of 18 Sakara began training with Roberto Almeida in Brazilian jiu-jitsu, later earning a black belt under former UFC veteran Marcus "Conan" Silveira. Sakara turned to mixed martial arts after competing in amateur boxing matches because he did not think he would be able to support himself with the little money that boxers in Italy receive, and also did not prefer the tactical approach of the sport. Sakara was also attracted to the rising sport of mixed martial arts after his uncle showed him a VHS tape of UFC 5, which featured a bout between future UFC Hall of Famers Ken Shamrock and Royce Gracie, when Sakara was 19 years old. Shortly afterwards in 2000, Sakara relocated to Brazil in order to train with names like Ricardo De La Riva and Antônio Rogério Nogueira.

== Mixed martial arts career ==
=== Early career ===
Sakara made his professional mixed martial arts debut in 2002, and compiled a record of 13–3 before being signed by the UFC.

=== Ultimate Fighting Championship ===
Sakara made his UFC debut at UFC 55, fighting against Ron Faircloth. The bout was ruled a no contest due to an inside leg kick to Sakara's groin.

Sakara next fought Elvis Sinosic at UFC 57 on February 4, 2006. He won the bout via a unanimous decision despite having a point deducted due to an illegal elbow.

Sakara was submitted in his next bout at UFC 60 by decorated grappling specialist and former King of the Cage Middleweight Champion Dean Lister.

Sakara was next expected to face Wilson Gouveia at UFC 65 on November 18, 2006. However, Gouveia withdrew from the bout due to an injury and was replaced by Drew McFedries. Sakara lost the bout via first-round TKO.

Sakara rebounded from these losses when he fought Victor Valimaki at UFC 70 on April 21, 2007. He won via TKO at 1:44 of the first round.

At UFC 75 on September 8, 2007, Sakara lost for the third time in four fights, losing via first round TKO to Houston Alexander.

Sakara was part of UFC 80 on January 19, 2008, where he won via TKO in the first round against veteran James Lee.

==== Move down to middleweight ====
Following his victory over Lee, Sakara announced that he would be moving down to the Middleweight division. He made his middleweight debut against former WEC Middleweight Champion Chris Leben at UFC 82 on March 1, 2008. He lost the fight via first-round knockout.

At UFC Fight Night 15, Sakara defeated Joe Vedepo via KO in the first round with a head kick, which earned him Knockout of the Night honors.

Sakara was then expected to face Jake Rosholt at UFC Fight Night 17 on February 7, 2009, but the bout was cancelled when Sakara had to pull out due to a shoulder injury and was replaced by Dan Miller.

Sakara was then scheduled to face Rousimar Palhares at UFC 99 on June 13, 2009. However, for unknown reasons the bout was moved to take place at UFC 101 on August 8, 2009. Eventually, Palhares ended up withdrawing from the bout due to an injury and was replaced by former title challenger Thales Leites. Sakara won the bout via split decision.

The bout with Palhares was re-booked to take place on December 5, 2009, at The Ultimate Fighter 10 Finale, but Sakara had to withdraw after suffering an undisclosed injury while training. He was replaced by Lucio Linhares.

Sakara defeated James Irvin via first-round TKO on March 21, 2010, at UFC LIVE: Vera vs. Jones.

Sakara was forced to pull out of his fight with Nate Marquardt on July 3, 2010 at UFC 116 due to the death of his father.

Sakara was then scheduled to face Jorge Rivera on August 28, 2010 at UFC 118, but Rivera pulled out of the bout with an injury and was replaced by Gerald Harris In turn, Sakara was forced off the card with an injury and replaced by Joe Vedepo.

His bout with Rivera was then rescheduled and was expected to take place on November 13, 2010, at UFC 122, but the fight was cancelled, Sakara intended on competing despite experiencing flu-like symptoms, but the bout was terminated due to Sakara vomiting backstage.

Sakara was expected to face Maiquel Falcão on March 3, 2011 at the UFC Live: Sanchez vs. Kampmann event. However, Falcão was injured while training and replaced by Rafael Natal. Then in early February, Natal pulled out of the bout due to a knee injury, and was replaced by promotional newcomer Chris Weidman. Sakara lost a unanimous decision after getting repeatedly taken down and controlled by Weidman's wrestling.

The bout between Sakara and Rivera was rescheduled again for August 6, 2011 at UFC 133, but Sakara was forced out of the bout after tearing the ACL in his knee while training and was replaced by Costas Philippou.

Sakara faced Brian Stann on April 14, 2012, at UFC on Fuel TV: Gustafsson vs. Silva. He lost the fight via KO in the first round.

Sakara lost to Patrick Côté due to disqualification on November 17, 2012, at UFC 154 after rocking Côte with elbows, only to get caught up in the moment and land multiple blows to the back of Côté's head. Sakara's team immediately appealed the result, but the Quebec commission denied the appeal.

In late November 2012, Sakara signed a new four-fight contract with the UFC.

A rematch was briefly linked with Côté for March 16, 2013 at UFC 158. However, Sakara was forced out of the bout with a kidney illness.

Sakara was slated to face Tom Watson at UFC Fight Night 30. However, Watson was forced out of the bout with an injury and was replaced by Magnus Cedenblad. Subsequently in early October, Cedenblad was forced out of the Sakara bout with an injury and replaced by newcomer Nico Musoke. Sakara lost the fight by submission due to an armbar in the first round and was released from the promotion shortly after.

=== Final Fight Championship ===
After a nine-month delay, on July 24, 2014, Sakara signed a three-fight deal with the European promotion Final Fight Championship. During the press conference he stated that his UFC career was compromised because he had enormous trouble cutting weight at 84 kg (185 pounds) and that he will continue his career in the Light Heavyweight division.

Sakara's Final Fight Championship debut took place on December 6, 2014 against Maciej Browarski. The fight was stopped in the first round when Sakara wasn't able to continue after getting injured from tearing his bicep. First Browarski was awarded the victory via TKO (injury), the result was later overturned to a No Contest by the Croatian MMA Federation.

In his next fight, Sakara faced off against Lebanon's Dib Akil. Following the opening seconds of the round, in which Akil threw wild hooks that unsuccessfully landed, Sakara took Akil to the ground and piled up punches until the TKO stoppage.

=== Bellator MMA ===
On November 27, 2015, it was announced that Sakara signed a three-fight contract with Bellator MMA.

Sakara made his promotional debut against Brian Rogers at Bellators first event in Sakara's native Italy on April 16, 2016 at Bellator 152. He won via knockout in the second round.

On September 21, 2016, it was announced that Sakara would be facing Joey Beltran in the co-main event of Bellator 168 on December 10, 2016. He won via knockout in the first round.

==== Bellator title shot ====
Sakara challenged Rafael Carvalho for the Bellator Middleweight Championship on December 9, 2017 at Bellator 190. He lost via knockout in the first round.

==== Post title shot reign ====
Sakara headlined Bellator 211 against Kent Kauppinen on December 1, 2018. He lost the fight via knockout in the first round.

Sakara faced Canaan Grigsby at Bellator Milan on October 12, 2019. He won the fight via TKO in the first round.

Sakara was scheduled to face Darwin Rodriguez at Bellator Milan 3 on October 3, 2020. However, Sakara ended up withdrawing from the bout due to an undisclosed injury.

On July 10, 2021, it was announced that he was no longer under contract with Bellator. However, in early 2023 news surfaced that Sakara was still under contract with Bellator.

== Bare-knuckle boxing ==
In February 2023, it was announced that Sakara had signed a multi-fight contract with Bare Knuckle Fighting Championship.

Sakara faced Erick Lozano on July 25, 2025 at BKFC Fight Night 27. He won the fight by knockout in the second round.

Sakara competed for the BKFC Cruiserweight Championship against current champion Chris Camozzi on October 25, 2025 at BKFC 83. He won the championship by split decision.

== Personal life ==
Sakara has two sons from a previous marriage. Recognizable for his many tattoos, Sakara has the words "Senatus Populusque Romanus" on his forearm, a common marking of soldiers of the Roman Empire, as well as several other tattoos that are a tribute to his ethnic background and love of Roman history. His surname comes from Saqqara, which was a Roman colony in Egypt.

=== Autobiography ===
In May 2020, a book in Italian about Sakara – Ogni giorno in battaglia. La mentalità del legionario – was published (ISBN 978-8885493957).

== Championships and accomplishments ==
- Ultimate Fighting Championship
  - Knockout of the Night (One time) vs. Joe Vedepo
  - UFC.com Awards
    - 2006: Ranked #10 Fight of the Year vs. Drew McFedries (Tied with Sam Stout vs. Spencer Fisher)
    - 2009: Ranked #7 Upset of the Year vs. Thales Leites
- Italy Chinese Kung Fu Association
  - Italian Heavyweight Pro Sanshou Champion
- World Chinese Kung Fu Association (World Pro Sanshou Championship)
  - Silver Medal in Pro Sanshou: Heavyweight Class
- Bare Knuckle Fighting Championship
  - BKFC Cruiserweight World Champion (One time, Current)

== Mixed martial arts record ==
Professional record breakdown
37 matches	22 wins	13 losses
By knockout	16	6
By submission	2	3
By decision	4	3
By disqualification	0	1
No contests	2	

Res.	Record	Opponent	Method	Event	Date	Round	Time	Location	Notes
Win	22–13 (2)	Prince McLean	TKO (shoulder injury)	Gamebred Bareknuckle MMA 8	November 15, 2024	1	5:00	Biloxi, Mississippi, United States	Bare knuckle MMA.
Win	21–13 (2)	Canaan Grigsby	TKO (punches)	Bellator 230	October 12, 2019	1	0:23	Milan, Italy	
Loss	20–13 (2)	Kent Kauppinen	KO (punch)	Bellator 211	December 1, 2018	1	1:10	Genoa, Italy	
Win	20–12 (2)	Jamie Sloane	TKO (punches)	Bellator 203	July 14, 2018	1	1:19	Rome, Italy	
Loss	19–12 (2)	Rafael Carvalho	KO (elbow)	Bellator 190	December 9, 2017	1	0:45	Florence, Italy	For the Bellator Middleweight World Championship.
Win	19–11 (2)	Joey Beltran	TKO (punches)	Bellator 168	December 10, 2016	1	1:20	Florence, Italy	
Win	18–11 (2)	Brian Rogers	KO (punches)	Bellator 152	April 16, 2016	2	2:29	Turin, Italy	
Win	17–11 (2)	Dib Akil	TKO (punches)	Final Fight Championship 19	September 18, 2015	1	1:32	Linz, Austria	
NC	16–11 (2)	Maciej Browarski	NC (overturned)	Final Fight Championship 16	December 6, 2014	1	1:21	Vienna, Austria	Return to Light Heavyweight. Originally a TKO (arm injury) win for Browarski; overturned by Croatian MMA Federation, explaining that Sakara's injury was not caused by a punch or any attack of any sort from his opponent.
Loss	16–11 (1)	Nico Musoke	Submission (armbar)	UFC Fight Night: Machida vs. Munoz	October 26, 2013	1	3:07	Manchester, England	
Loss	16–10 (1)	Patrick Côté	DQ (punches to back of head)	UFC 154	November 17, 2012	1	1:26	Montreal, Quebec, Canada	
Loss	16–9 (1)	Brian Stann	KO (punches)	UFC on Fuel TV: Gustafsson vs. Silva	April 14, 2012	1	2:26	Stockholm, Sweden	
Loss	16–8 (1)	Chris Weidman	Decision (unanimous)	UFC Live: Sanchez vs. Kampmann	March 3, 2011	3	5:00	Louisville, Kentucky, United States	
Win	16–7 (1)	James Irvin	TKO (punch)	UFC Live: Vera vs. Jones	March 21, 2010	1	3:01	Broomfield, Colorado, United States	
Win	15–7 (1)	Thales Leites	Decision (split)	UFC 101	August 8, 2009	3	5:00	Philadelphia, Pennsylvania, United States	
Win	14–7 (1)	Joe Vedepo	KO (head kick)	UFC Fight Night: Diaz vs. Neer	September 17, 2008	1	1:27	Omaha, Nebraska, United States	Knockout of the Night.
Loss	13–7 (1)	Chris Leben	TKO (punches)	UFC 82	March 1, 2008	1	3:16	Columbus, Ohio, United States	Middleweight debut.
Win	13–6 (1)	James Lee	TKO (punches)	UFC 80	January 19, 2008	1	1:30	Newcastle, England	
Loss	12–6 (1)	Houston Alexander	TKO (knee and punches)	UFC 75	September 8, 2007	1	1:01	London, England, United Kingdom	
Win	12–5 (1)	Victor Valimaki	TKO (punches)	UFC 70	April 21, 2007	1	1:44	Manchester, England	
Loss	11–5 (1)	Drew McFedries	TKO (punches)	UFC 65	November 18, 2006	1	4:07	Sacramento, California, United States	
Loss	11–4 (1)	Dean Lister	Submission (triangle choke)	UFC 60	May 27, 2006	1	1:20	Los Angeles, California, United States	
Win	11–3 (1)	Elvis Sinosic	Decision (unanimous)	UFC 57	February 4, 2006	3	5:00	Las Vegas, Nevada, United States	Sakara was deducted 1 point due to an illegal elbow.
NC	10–3 (1)	Ron Faircloth	NC (Sakara kicked in the groin)	UFC 55	October 7, 2005	2	0:10	Uncasville, Connecticut, United States	Accidental groin kick rendered Faircloth unable to continue.
Win	10–3	Frank Amaugou	Decision (unanimous)	King of the Ring	February 19, 2005	3	N/A	Milan, Italy	
Win	9–3	Tihamer Brunner	TKO (punches)	Ring Fight	November 20, 2004	N/A	N/A	Bergamo, Italy	
Loss	8–3	Assuério Silva	Decision (unanimous)	Jungle Fight 3	October 23, 2004	3	5:00	Manaus, Brazil	
Win	8–2	Eduardo Maiorino	KO (punches)	Real Fight 1	July 30, 2004	1	0:30	Rio de Janeiro, Brazil	
Win	7–2	Yeon Jung	KO (punches)	WXF: X-Impact World Championships 2003	December 3, 2003	1	2:02	Seoul, South Korea	
Win	6–2	Rafael Tatu	TKO (doctor stoppage)	Meca 9: Meca World Vale Tudo 9	August 1, 2003	2	4:18	Rio de Janeiro, Brazil	
Win	5–2	Damien Riccio	Decision (unanimous)	Martial Arts Day	May 11, 2003	2	6:00	Rome, Italy	
Win	4–2	David Mortelette	TKO (punches)	Resa Dei Conti 6	December 20, 2002	1	1:12	Livorno, Italy	
Loss	3–2	Roman Zentsov	Decision (unanimous)	M-1 MFC: Russia vs. the World 4	November 15, 2002	2	5:00	St. Petersburg, Russia	
Loss	3–1	Simon Holmes	Submission (rear-naked choke)	CWFC 1: Armageddon	July 27, 2002	1	4:50	London, England	Cage Warriors One Tournament Final.
Win	3–0	Adam Woolmer	Submission (kimura)	CWFC 1: Armageddon	July 27, 2002	1	0:21	London, England	Cage Warriors One Tournament Semifinal.
Win	2–0	Mastioli	Submission (armbar)	Fight Night	June 21, 2002	1	0:20	Pomezia, Italy	
Win	1–0	Di Clementi	KO (punches)	Fight Night	June 21, 2002	1	0:13	Pomezia, Italy	

== Professional boxing record ==
9 fights	8 wins	1 loss
By knockout	6	1
By decision	2	0

No.	Result	Record	Opponent	Method	Round, time	Date	Location	Notes
9	Win	8–1	(Czech Republic) Tomáš Mrázek	PTS	6	May 9, 2009	Rome, Italy	
8	Win	7–1	(Germany) Andreas Guenther	KO	5 (6)	Mar 14, 2009	Rome, Italy	
7	Win	6–1	(France) Nabil Haciani	PTS	6	Dec 26, 2005	Rome, Italy	
6	Loss	5–1	(France) Jean Marc Monrose	KO	5 (10)	July 8, 2005	Lazio, Italy	For the vacant IBF Youth Cruiserweight Championship.
5	Win	5–0	(Brazil) Fernando Martinez	TKO	3 (6)	June 2, 2005	Salvador, Bahia, Brazil	
4	Win	4–0	(Romania) Florin Constandache Ilie	TKO	2 (6)	May 14, 2005	Rome, Italy	
3	Win	3–0	(Hungary) Imre Gergely	TKO	3 (6)	April 30, 2005	Rome, Italy	
2	Win	2–0	(Romania) Valentin Marinel	KO	3 (6)	Mar 19, 2005	Rome, Italy	
1	Win	1–0	(Brazil) Ubiracy Santos Lima	TKO	4 (6)	Aug 30, 2004	Salvador, Bahia, Brazil	

== Bare knuckle record ==
Professional record breakdown
2 matches	2 wins	0 losses
By knockout	1	0
By decision	1	0

Res.	Record	Opponent	Method	Event	Date	Round	Time	Location	Notes
Win	2–0	Chris Camozzi	Decision (split)	BKFC 83	October 25, 2025	5	2:00	Rome, Italy	Won the BKFC Cruiserweight Championship.
Win	1–0	Erick Lozano	KO	BKFC Fight Night Philly: Pague vs. Petersen	July 25, 2025	2	0:48	Philadelphia, Pennsylvania, United States	

== See also ==
- List of male boxers
