= UFC 59 =

UFC mixed martial arts event in 2006

UFC 59: Reality Check
- The poster for UFC 59: Reality Check
- Promotion: Ultimate Fighting Championship
- Date: April 15, 2006
- Venue: Arrowhead Pond
- City: Anaheim, California
- Attendance: 13,814 (13,060 paid)
- Total gate: $2,191,450
- Buyrate: 425,000

Event chronology
Ultimate Fight Night 4	UFC 59: Reality Check	UFC 60: Hughes vs Gracie

UFC 59: Reality Check was a mixed martial arts event held by the Ultimate Fighting Championship on April 15, 2006, at the Arrowhead Pond in Anaheim, California, and broadcast live on pay-per-view in the United States and Canada.

This was the first UFC event held in California after the state's legalization of mixed martial arts contests. It was a sold-out show, and was one of the fastest sell outs in UFC history.

According to the California State Athletic Commission, there were 13,060 tickets sold, with a live gate of $2,191,450. The disclosed fighter payroll for the event was $539,000.

== Results ==
Main Card
Weight class				Method	Round	Time	Notes
Heavyweight	Tim Sylvia	def.	Andrei Arlovski (c)	TKO (punches)	1	2:43	(Note: For the UFC Heavyweight Championship.)
Welterweight	Sean Sherk	def.	Nick Diaz	Decision (unanimous) (30–27, 30–27, 30–27)	3	5:00
Light Heavyweight	Tito Ortiz	def.	Forrest Griffin	Decision (split) (30–27, 28–29, 29–27)	3	5:00
Middleweight	Evan Tanner	def.	Justin Levens	Submission (triangle choke)	1	3:14	(Note: Levens replaced Jeremy Horn, who dropped out due to a back injury sustained during training.)
Heavyweight	Jeff Monson	def.	Marcio Cruz	Decision (split) (30–27, 29–28, 28–29)	3	5:00
Preliminary Card
Welterweight	Karo Parisyan	def.	Nick Thompson	TKO (punches)	1	4:44
Middleweight	David Terrell	def.	Scott Smith	Submission (rear-naked choke)	1	3:08	(Note: The referee called for a break in the action in which Smith stopped fighting and Terrell did not, allowing Terrell to secure a takedown and sink a rear naked choke. In the following weeks Smith filled an appeal with the CSAC to change the result to a "No Contest", but all his efforts were in vain. This was a preliminary fight that was not aired on the pay-per-view broadcast.)
Light Heavyweight	Jason Lambert	def.	Terry Martin	TKO (punches)	2	2:37	(Note: This was a preliminary fight that did not air on the pay-per-view broadcast.)
Welterweight	Thiago Alves	def.	Derrick Noble	TKO (punches)	1	2:54	(Note: This was a preliminary fight that did not air on the pay-per-view broadcast.)

== Bonus Awards ==
The following fighters received bonuses.

- Fight of the Night: Tito Ortiz vs. Forrest Griffin

== Encyclopedia awards ==
The following fighters were honored in the October 2011 book titled UFC Encyclopedia.

- Knockout of the Night: Tim Sylvia
- Submission of the Night: Evan Tanner

== Reported payout ==
- Tito Ortiz: $200,000
- Andrei Arlovski: $90,000
- Tim Sylvia: $90,000
- Evan Tanner: $40,000
- Karo Parisyan: $16,000
- Sean Sherk: $16,000
- Forrest Griffin: $16,000
- David Terrell: $12,000
- Nick Diaz: $10,000
- Jeff Monson: $10,000
- Jason Lambert: $8,000
- Thiago Alves: $8,000
- Justin Levens: $5,000
- Nick Thompson: $5,000
- Marcio Cruz: $5,000
- Derrick Noble: $3,000
- Scott Smith: $3,000
- Terry Martin: $2,000
- Disclosed Fighter Payroll: $539,000

== See also ==
- Ultimate Fighting Championship
- List of UFC champions
- List of UFC events
- 2006 in UFC
