= UFC Fight Night: Sanchez vs. Riggs =

UFC mixed martial arts event in 2006

- The poster for UFC Fight Night: Sanchez vs. Riggs
- Promotion: Ultimate Fighting Championship
- Date: December 13, 2006
- Venue: MCAS Miramar
- City: San Diego, California

Event chronology
UFC 65: Bad Intentions	UFC Fight Night: Sanchez vs. Riggs	UFC 66: Liddell vs. Ortiz

UFC Fight Night: Sanchez vs. Riggs (also known as UFC Fight Night 7) was a mixed martial arts event held by the Ultimate Fighting Championship on December 13, 2006 at the MCAS Miramar near San Diego, California. It was the first UFC event to take place on a military base. The audience consisted almost entirely of United States Marines stationed at Miramar; only five pairs of seats were available to the public via auction. All auction proceeds went to the Marine Corps Community Services Quality of Life Programs for the Marines and Families.

The two-hour broadcast drew a 1.3 overall rating on Spike TV. The disclosed fighter payroll for the event was $163,000.

== Results ==
Main Card
Weight class				Method	Round	Time	Notes
Welterweight	Diego Sanchez	def	Joe Riggs	KO (knee and punches)	1	1:45
Welterweight	Josh Koscheck	def	Jeff Joslin	Decision (unanimous) (30–27, 30–27, 30–27)	3	5:00
Welterweight	Karo Parisyan	def	Drew Fickett	Decision (unanimous) (30–27, 30–27, 30–27)	3	5:00
Welterweight	Marcus Davis	def	Shonie Carter	Decision (unanimous) (30–26, 29–28, 30–27)	3	5:00
Preliminary Card
Middleweight	Alan Belcher	def	Jorge Santiago	KO (head kick)	3	2:45
Welterweight	Luigi Fioravanti	def	Dave Menne	TKO (punches)	1	4:44
Light Heavyweight	David Heath	def	Victor Valimaki	Decision (split) (29–28, 28–29, 29–28)	3	5:00
Welterweight	Brock Larson	def	Keita Nakamura	Decision (unanimous) (29–28, 29–28, 29–28)	3	5:00
Middleweight	Logan Clark	def.	Steve Byrnes	Decision (unanimous) (30–27, 30–27, 29–28)	3	5:00

== Encyclopedia awards ==
The following fighters were honored in the October 2011 book titled UFC Encyclopedia.

- Fight of the Night: Karo Parisyan vs. Drew Fickett
- Knockout of the Night: Alan Belcher

== See also ==
- Ultimate Fighting Championship
- List of UFC champions
- List of UFC events
- 2006 in UFC
