= UFC 61 =

UFC mixed martial arts event in 2006

UFC 61: Bitter Rivals
- The poster for UFC 61: Bitter Rivals
- Promotion: Ultimate Fighting Championship
- Date: July 8, 2006
- Venue: Mandalay Bay Events Center
- City: Paradise, Nevada
- Attendance: 11,167 (9,999 paid)
- Total gate: $3,350,775.15
- Buyrate: 775,000

Event chronology
Ultimate Fight Night 5	UFC 61: Bitter Rivals	UFC Fight Night: Sanchez vs. Parisyan

UFC 61: Bitter Rivals was a mixed martial arts event held by the Ultimate Fighting Championship on Saturday, July 8, 2006. The event took place at the Mandalay Bay Events Center, in the Las Vegas suburb of Paradise, Nevada and was broadcast live on pay-per-view in the United States.

== Background ==
The main event was a Heavyweight Championship match between champion Tim Sylvia and former champion Andrei Arlovski. This was the third time these fighters had met, they had split the first two meetings. The co-main event was the highly anticipated rematch of TUF 3 coaches Tito Ortiz and Ken Shamrock.

It was announced during the event that Chuck Liddell would fight PRIDE star Wanderlei Silva in November if Liddell won his upcoming match against Renato "Babalu" Sobral at UFC 62. Negotiations between the UFC and PRIDE failed however and the Liddell–Silva fight never occurred in November 2006. The two eventually met in December 2007 at UFC 79.

The number of pay-per-view buys for UFC 61 in the United States was approximately 775,000, which set a new UFC buyrate record and generated gross PPV revenue of approximately $30,960,000. The disclosed fighter payroll for the event was $686,000. With a live gate at $3,350,775, it nearly eclipsed the all-time mark for UFC events set at UFC 57.

== Results ==
Main Card
Weight class				Method	Round	Time	Notes
Heavyweight	Tim Sylvia (c)	def.	Andrei Arlovski	Decision (unanimous) (48–47, 49–46, 48–47)	5	5:00	(Note: For the UFC Heavyweight Championship.)
Welterweight	Josh Burkman	def.	Josh Neer	Decision (unanimous) (29–28, 30–27, 29–28)	3	5:00
Light Heavyweight	Tito Ortiz	def.	Ken Shamrock	TKO (elbows)	1	1:18
Heavyweight	Frank Mir	def.	Dan Christison	Decision (unanimous) (29–28, 29–28, 29–28)	3	5:00
Lightweight	Joe Stevenson	def.	Yves Edwards	TKO (doctor stoppage)	2	5:00
Preliminary Card
Catchweight (165 lb)	Hermes França	def.	Joe Jordan	Submission (triangle choke)	3	0:47	(Note: França was originally matched with Roger Huerta. However, Huerta withdrew from the card due to injury and was replaced by Joe Jordan. The fight took place at a catchweight of 165 lb, instead of lightweight, as allowances were made for Jordan as a late replacement.)
Heavyweight	Jeff Monson	def.	Anthony Perosh	TKO (punches)	1	2:42
Heavyweight	Cheick Kongo	def.	Gilbert Aldana	TKO (doctor stoppage)	1	4:13
Welterweight	Drew Fickett	def.	Kurt Pellegrino	Submission (rear-naked choke)	3	1:20

== Bonus awards ==
- Fight of the Night: Joe Stevenson vs. Yves Edwards
- Knockout of the Night: Jeff Monson
- Submission of the Night: Hermes Franca

== Reported payouts ==
Tito Ortiz: $210,000

Tim Sylvia: $120,000

Ken Shamrock: $100,000

Andrei Arlovski: $90,000

Frank Mir: $56,000

Joe Stevenson: $24,000

Jeff Monson: $20,000

Drew Fickett: $12,000

Josh Burkman: $10,000

Yves Edwards: $8,000

Hermes Franca: $8,000

Cheick Kongo: $6,000

Josh Neer: $6,000

Dan Christison: $5,000

Joe Jordan: $4,000

Anthony Perosh: $3,000

Kurt Pellegrino: $2,000

Gilbert Aldana: $2,000

Disclosed Fighter Payroll: $686,000

== See also ==
- Ultimate Fighting Championship
- List of UFC champions
- List of UFC events
- 2006 in UFC

== Sources ==
- Mixed martial arts show results, Mandalay Bay, July 8, 2006 (PDF), Nevada State Athletic Commission. Retrieved July 13, 2006.
- UFC Fighter Salaries for 2006 (includes fighter salaries for UFC 61)
- UFC 61 Surpasses $30 Million in Pay-Per-View Sales
- https://www.fightopinion.com/2006/07/20/ufc-61-payouts/ UFC 61 payouts
