= Márcio Cruz =

Brazilian jiu-jitsu and mixed martial arts practitioner from Brazil

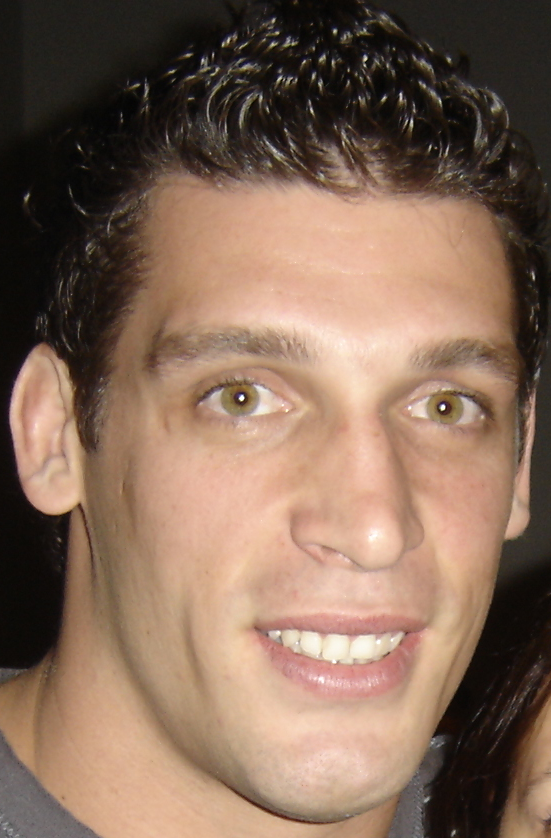
- Born: April 24, 1978 (age 48); Rio de Janeiro, Brazil
- Other names: Pé de Pano
- Height: 6 ft 4 in (1.93 m)
- Weight: 206 lb (93 kg; 14.7 st)
- Division: Light heavyweight, Heavyweight
- Reach: 82 in (208 cm)
- Style: Brazilian jiu-jitsu, karate, submission wrestling
- Fighting out of: Lutz, Florida, United States
- Team: Gracie Fusion / Team Pé de Pano / MCBJJ
- Rank: Fifth degree black belt in Brazilian jiu-jitsu
- Years active: 2005–2012

Mixed martial arts record
- Total: 11
- Wins: 8
- By knockout: 2
- By submission: 4
- By decision: 1
- By disqualification: 1
- Losses: 3
- By knockout: 2
- By decision: 1

Other information
- Mixed martial arts record from Sherdog

Márcio Cruz
Medal record

Representing Brazil

Men's Grappling

ADCC Submission Wrestling World Championship
Bronze medal – third place	2001 Abu Dhabi	+99kg
Gold medal – first place	2003 St. Paulo	+99kg
Bronze medal – third place	2007 Trenton	+99kg

Brazilian jiu-jitsu

World Championship
Gold medal – first place	2002	+100 kg
Gold medal – first place	2002	Absolute
Gold medal – first place	2003	Absolute

Pan-American Championship
Gold medal – first place	2003 – California, USA	+100kg
Gold medal – first place	2003 – California, USA	Absolute
Gold medal – first place	2005 – California, USA	+100kg
Gold medal – first place	2005 – California, USA	Absolute

Brazilian National Championship
Gold medal – first place	2000 Rio de Janeiro, Brazil	-100kg
Gold medal – first place	2000 Rio de Janeiro, Brazil	Absolute
Gold medal – first place	2001 Rio de Janeiro, Brazil	-100kg

Márcio Cruz (born April 24, 1978) is a Brazilian jiu-jitsu practitioner and mixed martial artist. In jiu-jitsu, he is a fifth degree black belt under Carlos Gracie Jr. and is a six-time IBJJF Mundials World Champion, five-time IBJJF Brazilian Nationals Champion, eight-time IBJJF Pan-American Champion, 2003 ADCC World Champion, two-time Abu Dhabi World Jiu Jitsu Legends Champion and UFC Veteran Fighter.

He competed in the UFC and also had a one-fight stint as an alternate for the New York Pitbulls of the International Fight League.

== Background ==
Cruz was born in Rio de Janeiro and had a brief stint with karate when he was 12 years old before being introduced to Brazilian jiu-jitsu by a friend. Although he had wanted to begin training in the sport immediately, due to the lack of a nearby gym, he began learning judo. It was not until age 17 that Cruz began his official training in jiu-jitsu. He won his first major title in only three years.

== Championships and achievements ==
=== Grappling credentials ===
Cruz is a six-time Brazilian Jiu-Jitsu World Champion, five-time Brazilian Jiu-Jitsu National Champion, eight-time Brazilian Jiu-Jitsu Pan-American Champion and the 2003 ADCC World Champion. He is undefeated at the Abu Dhabi World Jiu Jitsu Legends. He won the Championship two years in a row (2016 and 2017). Cruz won the Black Belt Absolute Division twice, being awarded two unique Champion Ring in a 2018 IBJJF Celebration. People he has defeated include Ricco Rodriguez, Mike Van Arsdale, Roger Gracie, Gabriel Gonzaga, Paulo Filho, Fabrício Werdum, Xande Ribeiro, Marcelo Garcia, Saulo Ribeiro, Fernando Augusto, Jeff Monson, and Fernado "Margarida" Pontes.

Since he started his mixed martial arts career, Cruz has been training MMA with Roberto "Gordo" Correa and he fights under the Marcio Cruz BJJ team and Ring Team. Cruz continues to train for competitions with former technical coordinator and strength conditioning coach of the legendary Team Nogueira, Diogo Souza.

His favorite technique is the triangle choke.

== Mixed martial arts career ==
As a professional MMA fighter, Cruz has fought in the Ultimate Fighting Championship, defeating former UFC Heavyweight Champion Frank Mir by TKO at UFC 57. He also holds a win over Keigo Kunihara at UFC 55. He lost a split decision to Jeff Monson, whom he had previously defeated twice in grappling tournaments, at UFC 59. Cruz' second MMA loss was to Andrei Arlovski at UFC 66, in December 2006, by first-round knockout.

In June 2007 in the IFL, he defeated Rafael Feijao by disqualification when Feijao used an illegal kick 1:18 before the end of the 3rd and final round. In June 2008, Cruz defeated Mu Bae Choi at Sengoku 3 via submission (triangle armbar). In April 2009, he defeated UFC veteran Dan Christison by unanimous decision.

On August 22, 2009, he beat Tom Sauer via TKO in the second round. With this victory he won the World Fighting Organization Heavyweight Championship. He successfully defended his belt by submitting Dave Yost with a Rear Naked Choke in the first round on April 3, 2010.

Cruz had to withdraw from Abu Dhabi Fighting Championship with a spinal injury in May 2010.

After 15 months of inactivity, he faced Glover Teixeira at Clube da Luta on July 20, 2011 losing via TKO (punches) at 4:21 in the second round. Cruz weighed in at an out-of-shape 256-pounds.

Cruz was scheduled to make his light heavyweight debut against fellow UFC veteran Gilbert Yvel on November 2, 2012, at Resurrection Fighting Alliance 4 in Las Vegas, Nevada. However, Yvel was forced to pull out of the bout due to an injury. Cruz ended up facing Joe Yager at the event and won the fight by submission.

== Personal life ==
Cruz is a Christian. He has been married since 2009 to Ariana Cruz, and has four children: Renan, Matthew, Clara and Aaylah.

Cruz runs a Brazilian jiu-jitsu academy in Tampa, Florida, with a second location in Carrollwood, Florida.

His nickname, "Pé de Pano", was given to him by his friends at the Gracie Barra academy in Rio; it is the Portuguese version of the name of Woody Woodpecker's horse, SugarFoot.

== Mixed martial arts record ==
Professional record breakdown
11 matches	8 wins	3 losses
By knockout	2	2
By submission	4	0
By decision	1	1
By disqualification	1	0

Res.	Record	Opponent	Method	Event	Date	Round	Time	Location	Notes
Win	8–3	Joe Yager	Submission (inverted triangle choke)	RFA 4: Griffin vs. Escudero	November 2, 2012	2	4:16	Las Vegas, Nevada, United States	Light heavyweight debut
Loss	7–3	Glover Teixeira	TKO (punches)	Clube da Luta	July 20, 2011	2	4:21	Rio de Janeiro, Brazil	
Win	7–2	David Yost	Submission (rear-naked choke)	Art of Fighting 7 - Payday	April 3, 2010	1	1:22	Tampa, Florida, United States	Defended WFO Heavyweight Championship
Win	6–2	Tommy Sauer	TKO (punches)	Art of Fighting 4 - Damage	August 22, 2009	2	3:43	Tampa, Florida, United States	Won WFO Heavyweight Championship
Win	5–2	Dan Christison	Decision (unanimous)	ICF: Breakout	April 11, 2009	3	5:00	Cincinnati, Ohio, United States	
Win	4–2	Choi Mu-Bae	Submission (triangle armbar)	World Victory Road Presents: Sengoku 3	June 8, 2008	1	4:37	Saitama, Saitama, Japan	
Win	3–2	Rafael Cavalcante	DQ (illegal kick)	IFL: Las Vegas	June 16, 2007	3	3:42	Las Vegas, Nevada, United States	
Loss	2–2	Andrei Arlovski	KO (punches)	UFC 66: Liddell vs. Ortiz	December 30, 2006	1	3:15	Las Vegas, Nevada, United States	
Loss	2–1	Jeff Monson	Decision (split)	UFC 59: Reality Check	April 15, 2006	3	5:00	Anaheim, California, United States	
Win	2–0	Frank Mir	TKO (punches and elbows)	UFC 57: Liddell vs. Couture 3	February 4, 2006	1	4:15	Las Vegas, Nevada, United States	
Win	1–0	Keigo Kunihara	Submission (rear-naked choke)	UFC 55	October 7, 2005	2	1:02	Uncasville, Connecticut, United States	

== See also ==
- List of male mixed martial artists
