= Drew McFedries =

American mixed martial arts fighter

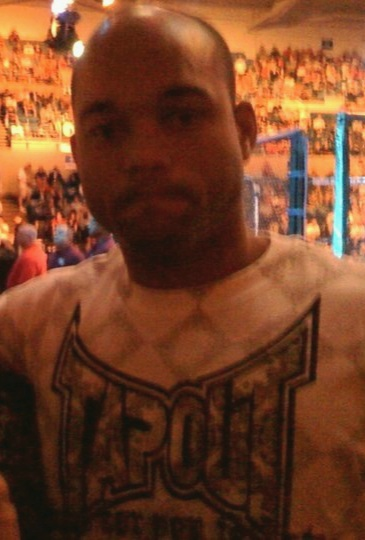
- Born: July 27, 1978 (age 48); Ames, Iowa, U.S.
- Other names: The Massacre
- Height: 6 ft 0 in (1.83 m)
- Weight: 185 lb (84 kg; 13.2 st)
- Division: Middleweight; Light Heavyweight
- Reach: 72 in (180 cm)
- Stance: Southpaw
- Fighting out of: Bettendorf, Iowa, United States
- Team: Miletich Fighting Systems; Champions Gym (formerly)
- Years active: 2001–2015

Mixed martial arts record
- Total: 19
- Wins: 12
- By knockout: 11
- By decision: 1
- Losses: 7
- By knockout: 2
- By submission: 4
- By decision: 1

Other information
- Mixed martial arts record from Sherdog

Drew McFedries (born July 27, 1978) is an American retired mixed martial artist. McFedries formerly competed for the UFC, Titan FC and Shooto.

== Background ==
McFedries was born in Ames, Iowa and raised in Bettendorf, Iowa. His mother, Agnes, battled drug addiction and was also involved in prostitution, forcing the young McFedries to be self-reliant from a young age while also supporting his siblings and often getting into fights. In his freshman year at Bettendorf High School, McFedries was expelled and was on the verge of dropping out of school altogether but was noticed by his gym teacher, and recruited by the head football coach at the school. Both were great mentors to the young McFedries, who would letter in football, track, soccer, and baseball after not competing in organized sports until his sophomore year. After graduating, he attended Iowa Central Community College where he earned an associate's degree and then St. Ambrose University to study sports management but did not graduate. After college, McFedries worked as a bouncer and fought in amateur mixed martial arts fights at a local bar, before being invited by local legendary fighter and coach Pat Miletich, to train at Miletich Fighting Systems.

== Mixed martial arts career ==
=== Early career ===
McFedries made his professional debut in 2001 against future UFC veteran Nate Quarry and lost by TKO due to punches. In his next bout, McFedries faced current UFC fighter Claude Patrick and won via unanimous decision.

McFedries then put together his fourth consecutive win before making his UFC debut.

=== Ultimate Fighting Championship ===
With a 4-1 professional record, McFedries made his UFC debut and Light Heavyweight debut at UFC 65 against Italian Alessio Sakara on November 11, 2006 in Sacramento, California. Despite being a heavy underdog, McFedries defeated Sakara via TKO in a highly-entertaining fight as the two exchanged huge punches.

In his next bout at UFC 68, McFedries fought against Danish fighter Martin Kampmann and lost via arm-triangle choke submission.

McFedries' next fight was against Bulgarian Olympic wrestler Jordan Radev at UFC Fight Night: Stout vs. Fisher. McFedries won with a highlight-reel knockout only 33 seconds into the fight and won "Knockout of the Night" honors.

His next bout was against Canadian Patrick Côté. Days before Christmas and only a matter of weeks before the fight, McFedries' mother was murdered. McFedries elected to fight anyway but lost via TKO.

In his next bout at The Ultimate Fighter: Team Rampage vs. Team Forrest Finale, McFedries was pitted against former King of the Cage Super Heavyweight Champion Marvin Eastman. McFedries won the fight via knockout and was again awarded "Knockout of the Night" honors.

McFedries then lost via kimura submission to Mike Massenzio at UFC Fight Night 15 and to Brazilian jiu-jitsu specialist Thales Leites via rear-naked choke submission at UFC 90.

In 2009, he returned with a TKO victory over Xavier Foupa-Pokam at UFC 98, dominating Foupa-Pokam before the fight was stopped at only 37 seconds into the first round. After criticizing his team Miletich Fighting Systems, McFedries, who had felt that he had not been supported by MFS, learned that he had been kicked out of the camp at the post-fight press conference.

McFedries then lost at the hands of Tomasz Drwal via rear-naked choke submission at UFC 103. Following the loss McFedries was released from his contract. Only the last of McFedries' nine UFC fights got out of the first round, and he holds the record for the shortest average fight time in UFC history (for fighters with more than five UFC bouts) at two minutes and 20 seconds.

=== Post-UFC career ===
McFedries was expected to face former King of the Cage Middleweight Champion Joey Villaseñor on September 11, 2010 at Shark Fights 13, but was replaced by Danillo Villefort due to injury.

McFedries returned to train with Miletich Fighting Systems.

In his first post-UFC fight, McFedries faced Samoan Gary Tapusoa on January 29, 2011 at Titan Fighting Championships 16. He won the fight via TKO.

McFedries then faced Garret Olson in a catchweight bout of 196 lbs. on August 27, 2011 at ProElite 1. He got another TKO victory, in the second round.

McFedries was scheduled to face Zak Cummings at Titan Fighting Championship 25 on September 25, 2012. However McFedries was forced to pull out of the bout due to injury and was replaced by Tommy Speer. It was later announced that Titan Fighting Championship 25 would be postponed due to bad weather conditions.

McFedries faced Jeremy Kimball at Paramount Prize Fighting 1 on January 25, 2013. He lost the fight via unanimous decision.

McFedries returned to action after a two-year hiatus to fight Bill Hill at XFO 55 on April 25, 2015, and won less than a minute in the first round via knockout. After the fight McFedries said he plans on making another run at the UFC.

== Personal life ==
On November 3, 2012 McFedries was stabbed in the upper-shoulder area of his back while working as a bouncer at a Davenport, Iowa night club. McFedries stated in an interview with FightLockdown that if he were not doing mixed martial arts that he would like to have several children, spread his beliefs in Christianity, and possibly do rap music videos with the support of his girlfriend. McFedries is afflicted with Crohn's disease, being diagnosed with the illness around 2002, and has spoken in many interviews about his struggle with the disorder. It has not stopped him from competing in mixed martial arts, but he does believe it has a large effect on his digestive ability. He has a brother who is much younger, and two younger sisters.

== Championships and achievements ==
- Ultimate Fighting Championship
  - Knockout of the Night (Two times) vs. Jordan Radev and Marvin Eastman
  - UFC.com Awards
    - 2006: Ranked #10 Fight of the Year vs. Alessio Sakara (Tied with Sam Stout vs. Spencer Fisher)

== Mixed martial arts record ==
Professional record breakdown
19 matches	12 wins	7 losses
By knockout	11	2
By submission	0	4
By decision	1	1

Res.	Record	Opponent	Method	Event	Date	Round	Time	Location	Notes
Win	12–7	Tony Parker	TKO (submission to punches)	XFO 56	August 15, 2015	2	2:41	Island Lake, Illinois, United States	
Win	11–7	Bill Hill	KO (punches)	XFO 55	April 25, 2015	1	0:57	Chicago, Illinois, United States	
Loss	10–7	Jeremy Kimball	Decision (unanimous)	Fight to Win: Paramount Prize Fighting	January 25, 2013	3	5:00	Denver, Colorado, United States	
Win	10–6	Garrett Olson	TKO (leg kick and punches)	ProElite 1: Arlovski vs. Lopez	August 27, 2011	2	4:04	Honolulu, Hawaii, United States	Catchweight (196 lbs) bout.
Win	9–6	Gary Tapusoa	TKO (punches)	Titan FC 16: Sylvia vs. Wagner	January 29, 2011	3	4:42	Kansas City, Kansas, United States	
Loss	8–6	Tomasz Drwal	Submission (rear-naked choke)	UFC 103	September 19, 2009	2	1:03	Dallas, Texas, United States	
Win	8–5	Xavier Foupa-Pokam	TKO (punches)	UFC 98	May 23, 2009	1	0:37	Las Vegas, Nevada, United States	
Loss	7–5	Thales Leites	Submission (rear-naked choke)	UFC 90	October 25, 2008	1	1:18	Rosemont, Illinois, United States	
Loss	7–4	Mike Massenzio	Submission (kimura)	UFC Fight Night: Diaz vs. Neer	September 17, 2008	1	1:28	Omaha, Nebraska, United States	
Win	7–3	Marvin Eastman	TKO (punches)	The Ultimate Fighter 7 Finale	June 21, 2008	1	1:08	Las Vegas, Nevada, United States	Knockout of the Night.
Loss	6–3	Patrick Côté	TKO (punches)	UFC Fight Night: Swick vs. Burkman	January 23, 2008	1	1:44	Las Vegas, Nevada, United States	
Win	6–2	Jordan Radev	KO (punches)	UFC Fight Night: Stout vs. Fisher	June 12, 2007	1	0:33	Hollywood, Florida, United States	Knockout of the Night.
Loss	5–2	Martin Kampmann	Technical Submission (arm-triangle choke)	UFC 68	March 3, 2007	1	4:06	Columbus, Ohio, United States	Return to Middleweight.
Win	5–1	Alessio Sakara	TKO (punches)	UFC 65	November 18, 2006	1	4:07	Sacramento, California, United States	Light Heavyweight bout.
Win	4–1	Brian Monahan	TKO (punches)	Extreme Challenge 71	October 7, 2006	1	N/A	Moline, Illinois, United States	
Win	3–1	Steve Evan Dau	TKO (submission to punches)	Extreme Challenge 51	August 2, 2003	2	1:26	St. Charles, Illinois, United States	
Win	2–1	Rafal Piszczek	TKO (punches)	Shooto: Midwest Fighting	May 21, 2003	2	2:37	Hammond, Indiana, United States	
Win	1–1	Claude Patrick	Decision (unanimous)	UCC 10: Battle for the Belts 2002	June 15, 2002	3	5:00	Hull, Quebec, Canada	
Loss	0–1	Nate Quarry	TKO (exhaustion)	Extreme Challenge 43	September 8, 2001	2	3:03	Orem, Utah, United States	

== See also ==
- List of male mixed martial artists
