= UFC Fight Night: Machida vs. Muñoz =

UFC mixed martial arts event in 2013

- The poster for UFC Fight Night: Machida vs. Muñoz
- Promotion: Ultimate Fighting Championship
- Date: October 26, 2013
- Venue: Phones 4u Arena
- City: Manchester, United Kingdom
- Attendance: 10,355
- Total gate: $1.5 million

Event chronology
| UFC 166: Velasquez vs. dos Santos III | UFC Fight Night: Machida vs. Muñoz | UFC: Fight for the Troops 3 |

UFC Fight Night: Machida vs. Muñoz (also known as UFC Fight Night 30) was a mixed martial arts event held on October 26, 2013, at the Phones 4u Arena in Manchester, United Kingdom.

== Background ==
The main card of the event was broadcast on Fox Sports 2.

The event was expected to be headlined by a middleweight bout between top contenders Michael Bisping and Mark Muñoz. However, on September 27 Bisping pulled out of the bout with an eye injury and was replaced by former UFC Light Heavyweight Champion Lyoto Machida.

Tom Watson was expected to face Alessio Sakara at this event. However, Watson had to pull out due to an injury and was replaced by Magnus Cedenblad. Subsequently, in early October, Cedenblad was forced out of the Sakara bout with an injury and replaced by newcomer Nico Musoke.

Paul Taylor was expected to face Anthony Njokuani at this event. However, Taylor was forced to pull out due to an injury and was replaced by Al Iaquinta. On September 24, Njokuani also pulled out of the event with an injury. Iaquinta eventually faced Piotr Hallmann.

Mike Wilkinson was expected to face Jimy Hettes at the event. However, Wilkinson pulled out of the bout in the week leading up the bout and was replaced by newcomer Rob Whiteford.

At the weigh-ins John Lineker weighed in at 128 pounds, two pounds over the non-title fight limit. He was fined a percentage of his purse which went to his opponent Phil Harris.

== Results ==
Main Card (Fox Sports 2)
| Weight class | | | | Method | Round | Time | Notes |
|---|---|---|---|---|---|---|---|
| Middleweight | Lyoto Machida | def. | Mark Muñoz | KO (head kick) | 1 | 3:10 |
| Lightweight | Ross Pearson | vs. | Melvin Guillard | No Contest (illegal knee) | 1 | 1:57 | (Note: Doctor deemed Pearson unable to continue after being cut by an accidental illegal knee.) |
| Light Heavyweight | Jimi Manuwa | def. | Ryan Jimmo | TKO (leg injury) | 2 | 4:41 |
| Lightweight | Norman Parke | def. | Jon Tuck | Decision (unanimous) (29–28, 29–28, 30–27) | 3 | 5:00 |
| Middleweight | Nico Musoke | def. | Alessio Sakara | Submission (armbar) | 1 | 3:07 |
| Catchweight (128 lb) | John Lineker | def. | Phil Harris | TKO (punches) | 1 | 2:51 |
Preliminary card (Online Prelims)
| Lightweight | Al Iaquinta | def. | Piotr Hallmann | Decision (unanimous) (29–28, 30–27, 30–27) | 3 | 5:00 |
| Middleweight | Luke Barnatt | def. | Andrew Craig | Submission (rear-naked choke) | 2 | 2:12 | (Note: This bout aired on the broadcast following the Manuwa vs Jimmo bout.) |
| Women's Bantamweight | Jéssica Andrade | def. | Rosi Sexton | Decision (unanimous) (30–26, 30–27, 30–26) | 3 | 5:00 |
| Featherweight | Cole Miller | def. | Andy Ogle | Decision (unanimous) (29–28, 29–28, 29–28) | 3 | 5:00 |
| Featherweight | Jimy Hettes | def. | Robert Whiteford | Technical Submission (triangle choke) | 2 | 2:17 |
| Middleweight | Brad Scott | def. | Michael Kuiper | Submission (standing guillotine choke) | 1 | 4:17 |

== Bonus awards ==
The following fighters received $50,000 bonuses.

- Fight of the Night: Luke Barnatt vs. Andrew Craig
- Knockout of the Night: Lyoto Machida
- Submission of the Night: Nicholas Musoke

== See also ==
- List of UFC events
- 2013 in UFC
