= Chris Leben =

American martial artist (born 1980)

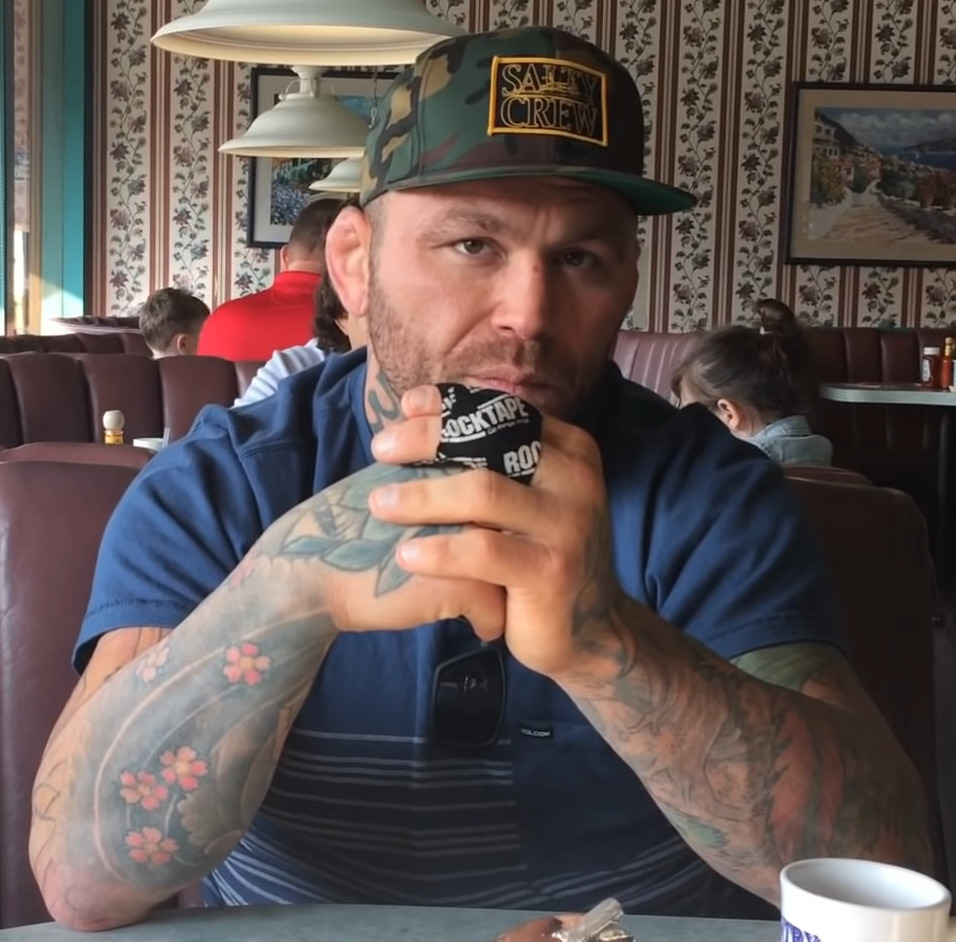
- Born: Christian Cyrus Leben; July 21, 1980 (age 46); Portland, Oregon, U.S.
- Other names: The Crippler
- Height: 5 ft 11 in (1.80 m)
- Weight: 185 lb (84 kg; 13 st 3 lb)
- Division: Middleweight
- Reach: 74 in (188 cm)
- Stance: Southpaw
- Fighting out of: Chula Vista, California, U.S.
- Team: Alliance MMA; Icon Fitness MMA (formerly); Team Quest (formerly)
- Years active: 2002–2013 (MMA); 2018–2020 (Bare-Knuckle Boxing)

Mixed martial arts record
- Total: 35
- Wins: 23
- By knockout: 12
- By submission: 5
- By decision: 6
- Losses: 12
- By knockout: 4
- By submission: 2
- By decision: 6

Other information
- Website: Chris Leben on Facebook
- Mixed martial arts record from Sherdog

Christian Cyrus Leben (born July 21, 1980) is an American former mixed martial artist, referee, and bare knuckle boxer. A professional MMA competitor from 2002 until 2013, he most notably competed in the UFC in the Middleweight division, compiling a record of 12–10 in 22 appearances for the organization. Leben first appeared in the inaugural season of The Ultimate Fighter reality series, and also fought in the now-defunct WEC. He began his UFC career with five victories in a row before suffering a knockout loss to future UFC Middleweight Champion Anderson Silva, and was known for his toughness, chin, determination, and powerful left hand. Leben was the inaugural WEC Middleweight Champion.

== Background ==
Leben is from Portland, Oregon and has one older brother and one younger sister. He grew up without his father around, and he did not meet his father until he was 23 years old. Because of this, Leben's mother worked hard for many hours daily as a bartender so that she could support the family. Growing up Leben enjoyed skateboarding, dirt biking, and snowboarding. When he was in middle school, he began watching the UFC and became very interested in MMA. He began training in boxing, and then was on the wrestling team at Benson Polytechnic High School, picking up the sport rather quickly. Leben did not receive a very good education in his childhood, and did not know how to read or write even after graduating high school. Leben soon joined the United States Army, falsely being told by the recruiter that he would be allowed to wrestle for the army's team. When he found that he would not be allowed to wrestle for the army, Leben went AWOL and was discharged.

== Mixed martial arts ==
=== Early career ===
While visiting his brother at work one day, Leben noticed an MMA gym located across the street, home to Team Quest. Trainer Robert Follis accepted Leben into the team, and soon Leben was training with Randy Couture, Matt Lindland, Nate Quarry, and Ed Herman. After refining his talent, Leben began fighting as an amateur, achieving a record of 5–0, and capturing the FCFF and UFCF middleweight titles.

After his success in the amateur ranks where he went 4–0, Leben turned professional. He won his first five fights, three of them by knockout, and in the process won the Gladiator Challenge, Sportfight, and WEC Middleweight titles. Leben achieved wins against Benji Radach and Mike Swick, but suffered a decision loss to Joe Doerksen.

=== The Ultimate Fighter ===
Leben was one of the most controversial and outspoken fighters on The Ultimate Fighter 1 due to his variously abrasive and melancholy personality. In the first episode, while intoxicated, he urinated on future teammate Jason Thacker's bed, and stole his pillow. One night when everyone in the household was drinking, Leben challenged Bobby Southworth to fight who then called Leben a "fatherless bastard" on account of Leben's father being absent during his childhood, requiring Leben being physically restrained from accosting Southworth. Leben then began sobbing and proceeded to sleep outside. After a heated confrontation precipitated by Josh Koscheck and Southworth spraying a sleeping Leben with a hose, Leben broke a door with his fist. After the confrontation, UFC president Dana White set up a match between Leben and Koscheck, which Leben lost by unanimous decision due to Koscheck's ability to score points by controlling Leben on the ground.

Later in the show, teammate Nate Quarry was eliminated from the competition due to an ankle injury and was able to choose a previously eliminated fighter to replace him. He chose Leben, who was later defeated by Kenny Florian due to doctor stoppage in the first semi-final match after Florian opened a cut above Leben's eye with an elbow strike. His losses on the show are not on his professional record, as the fights were classified by Nevada as exhibition bouts due to the decisions of the bouts not being disclosed until the fights aired on the show rather than being posted immediately following the fights.

=== Ultimate Fighting Championship ===
On April 9, 2005, Leben fought Jason Thacker on the undercard of the live finale of The Ultimate Fighter 1. Thacker was not amused when he watched the show and found out Leben had used his bed as a urinal. Speaking with Dana White, Thacker demanded a match against Leben at the finale. The match was set up, and Leben won 95 seconds into the first round after referee stoppage due to strikes. Afterward, Leben apologized to Thacker for urinating on his bed, saying he had since given up drinking because of that sort of incident.

After the show, Leben moved to Seattle, Washington, to train with AMC Pankration. He has competed in several UFC events since the show and is the only person to have fought in the first six Ultimate Fight Night events, during which he earned a string of victories: a split decision win over future TUF 4 finalist Patrick Côté, an armbar submission against Edwin Dewees, a first-round TKO over Jorge Rivera, and a unanimous decision over Luigi Fioravanti. Leben was defeated by Anderson Silva at UFC Ultimate Fight Night 5 on June 28, 2006, by KO 49 seconds into the first round, but returned at UFC Fight Night 6 on August 17, 2006, where he defeated Jorge Santiago by knockout 35 seconds into the second round. He is the only fighter to fight at every event under the "Fight Night" banner. This fight earned him a Knockout of the Night award.

Leben then lost at UFC 66 to longtime UFC veteran Jason MacDonald via technical submission due to a modified guillotine choke with less than a minute remaining in the second round.

Leben then lost to Kalib Starnes by a very close unanimous decision at UFC 71 on May 26, 2007. This fight earned him a $40,000 Fight of the Night award.

It was reported that Leben was offered a main event fight against Mike Swick at UFC Fight Night 11, but turned down the fight for unknown reasons; it was later revealed on the Ultimate Fighter Season 1 reunion show by UFC President Dana White's call to matchmaker Joe Silva that Leben's camp turned down the fight and that Leben himself had no prior knowledge of the fight offer. Leben instead took on Terry Martin on the same UFC Fight Night 11 card. Even after being rocked with multiple punches by Martin, a half-dazed Leben defeated Martin by knockout at 3:56 of the third round. This fight earned him another Knockout of the Night award.

At UFC 82, he knocked out Italian Alessio Sakara in the first round, winning another Knockout of the Night award.

On April 30, 2008, Leben was arrested in Oregon by Clackamas County Sheriffs for a DUI stemming from an earlier date. He was kept in jail and temporarily held without bond for allegedly violating his probation. Leben was then sentenced to 35 days in jail. This caused him to have to pull out of UFC 85 where he was scheduled to fight Michael Bisping.

The fight against Michael Bisping was then rescheduled for UFC 89, which he lost by a unanimous decision after a full three rounds. Leben taunted Bisping throughout the last two rounds by dropping his arms and raising his chin. The judges scored the fight 30–27 (twice) and 29–28 for Bisping. Bisping used effective counter punching in the fight to keep the aggressive Leben at bay. Both fighters showed sportsmanship by congratulating one another and raising each other's arm after the fight. After the fight with Bisping, Leben tested positive for Stanozolol and was suspended for nine months and fined a third of his fight purse. He was eligible to return in July 2009. Leben admitted he had used the substance several months prior to the fight, but stated he had assumed it would have been out of his system by then.

Leben then fought Jake Rosholt at UFC 102 in Leben's hometown of Portland, Oregon. In the third round, he was rendered unconscious via an arm triangle choke, losing the fight by submission.

Leben then faced Jay Silva on January 11, 2010, at UFC Fight Night 20, winning via unanimous decision (30–27, 30–27, 30–27).

Leben was expected to face Aaron Simpson at UFC 114, but the bout took place on June 19, 2010, at The Ultimate Fighter: Team Liddell vs. Team Ortiz Finale. After a rough first round where Simpson slammed Leben a couple of times, Leben eventually connected consecutive punches on Simpson in the second that sent him stumbling across the octagon, collapsing face first at the other side of the octagon, prompting referee Josh Rosenthal to end the fight via TKO at 4:17 of the second round. This fight earned him another Knockout of the Night award.

After Wanderlei Silva was forced out of his UFC 116 bout with Yoshihiro Akiyama due to broken ribs, Leben agreed to fill in for Silva in the bout against Akiyama, and faced him two weeks after defeating Simpson. Although he was outstruck and outwrestled for most of the first round, Leben managed to stay competitive and keep a fast-paced fight with the rapidly tiring Akiyama in the second round. In the third and final round, Leben capitalized and sunk in a triangle choke with just twenty seconds left in the fight, forcing Akiyama to submit. It was considered the best performance of Leben's career and one of the best fights of the year. This fight earned him another Fight of the Night award. After the fight, Leben called for a fight with Silva, saying "come on Wanderlei, I'll take you out, too!", though UFC president Dana White said in the post-fight press conference that a Leben-Silva affair is not under consideration. Leben won Sherdog.com's Comeback Fighter of the Year for 2010.

On October 20, 2010, Leben was arrested in Honolulu, Hawaii for suspicion of driving under the influence after crashing his truck into a wall off of Kapiolani Boulevard. He was released from custody after posting bail.

Leben faced Brian Stann on January 1, 2011, at UFC 125 He lost the fight via TKO in the first round. After the fight between Leben and Stann, Leben's coach Burton Richardson says Leben's poor performance may have been caused by a sickness before the bout: "First, great job by Brian Stann. He never looked better. Many have commented that Chris was very slow and looked off last night. The truth is that Chris was sick. He had a fever and chills when he stepped into the cage. He was vomiting in the locker room before the fight, and after a hard warm up he didn't have a drop of sweat. Big heart to fight like that, but he was moving slow motion. He was very sharp in training. He will be back."

On April 4, 2011, the UFC announced that Leben's next opponent would be Wanderlei Silva with the two scheduled to meet on July 2, 2011, at UFC 132. Leben knocked out Silva with consecutive uppercuts from the clinch, 27 seconds into the fight, resulting in the fastest knockout win in Leben's career.

Leben faced Mark Muñoz on November 5, 2011, at UFC 138, losing by TKO at the 5:00 mark of the 2nd round due to a cut on his left eyebrow and left him unable to see and forced a corner stoppage. On November 28, 2011, Zuffa LLC, owner of the Ultimate Fighting Championship, released information stating that Leben tested positive for oxycodone and oxymorphone following his loss to Muñoz at UFC 138. As a result of the positive test, Leben was suspended from fighting for 1 year.

Leben's return fight was expected to be against Karlos Vemola on December 29, 2012, at UFC 155. However, Vemola was forced out of the bout and replaced by promotional newcomer Derek Brunson. Leben was defeated via unanimous decision.

Leben fought Andrew Craig and lost by split decision on July 6, 2013, at UFC 162.

Leben faced Uriah Hall on December 28, 2013, at UFC 168. After almost being knocked out at the end of the first round, Leben told his corner that he was done, taking a TKO loss to Hall after the first round. UFC commentator Joe Rogan pointed out during the broadcast that Leben asked, "Was I knocked out?" as he was being led to his corner. Leben then reiterated "I'm done" multiple times before the fight was waved off. This marked Leben's fourth loss in a row.

=== Retirement ===
On January 20, 2014, Leben announced his retirement from MMA competition. He will continue his martial arts legacy by focusing on coaching his students and pro fighters at his new MMA gym "The Training Center" in San Diego, California. He cited an increasingly talented middleweight roster, his recent losing streak and the risk of serious injury as reasons for retiring. He called himself fortunate to have never had surgery throughout his record 22-fight middleweight stint, though he predicted several of his nagging injuries will get worse with time.

On February 5, 2021, after his first-round knockout win over Quentin Henry in the Bare Knuckle Fighting Championship, Leben announced his official retirement from combat sports.

=== Bellator MMA ===
After two years away from active competition for Leben, it was announced by Scott Coker on Inside MMA that Leben had signed a multi-fight deal with Bellator MMA in February 2016. However, after undergoing a physical to be cleared, he failed several electrocardiogram (EKG) tests, according to the statement. Doctors discovered a "life-threatening abnormality" to the left ventricle of his heart, which was "oversized", "misshapen", and "not operating properly," thus ending any possibility of a return.

=== Unretirement ===
In late 2018 Chris came out of retirement after being given an all-clear by doctors.

== Bare knuckle boxing ==
=== World Bare Knuckle Fighting Federation ===
After a return to MMA never materialized, Leben instead turned to bare knuckle boxing. He faced Phil Baroni at the World Bare Knuckle Fighting Federation debut card on November 9, 2018. He won the fight via TKO in the first round. In March 2019, reports surfaced that Leben had sued WBKFF for $90,000 in unpaid salary.

=== Bare Knuckle Fighting Championship ===
Leben made his debut for Bare Knuckle Fighting Championship on April 6, 2019 at BKFC 5. He faced Justin Baesman in the show's co-main event. Leben won the fight via knockout just 25 seconds into the first round.

Leben was supposed to face Brennan Ward at BKFC 6 on June 22, 2019. On June 12, news surfaced that Ward withdrew from the bout and was replaced by Dakota Cochrane. Leben lost the fight by unanimous decision.

Leben faced Quentin Henry at BKFC Knucklemania on February 5, 2021. He won the fight via knockout in the first round and subsequently announced his retirement from combat sports.

== Personal life ==
In May 2007, Leben moved to East Oahu, Hawaii to accept the main coaching job at Icon Fitness MMA Gym. In addition to training at ICON, Leben and fighter Steven "The Soul Samurai" Saito opened Ultimate Fight School gym in Oahu in January, located two blocks from the University of Hawaii campus. Leben is a playable fighter in the UFC Undisputed video games. Before becoming a professional fighter, Leben worked construction and was a housepainter. Leben has a radio show called "Unfiltered MMA Radio".

In 2016, Leben completed Herb Dean's mixed martial arts referee course, making him eligible to referee bouts in California. After refereeing in the regional circuit, Leben debuted in notable shows at Golden Boy Promotions: Liddell vs. Ortiz 3.

Having a well-documented past with substance abuse, Leben states he has been sober since 2015, and is actively advocating for clean eating and a healthy lifestyle.

In February 2022, Leben was hospitalized for breathing issues after contracting COVID-19.

=== Legal issues ===
In October 2010, Leben was arrested in Honolulu on suspicion of driving under the influence after crashing his pick-up truck near the Kapiolani Boulevard exit on Interstate H-1. He was later released on $1,000 bail.

In June 2015, Leben was arrested on multiple charges after breaking into his ex-wife's San Diego, California apartment. Charges included felony possession of a weapon and 11 counts of disobeying a court order after violating a restraining order his ex-wife had filed against him. When police arrived to the apartment, they found a .45 caliber pistol on a bed that belonged to Leben. In August, Leben pleaded guilty to the felony weapons charge and to the misdemeanor charges of vandalism and violating a restraining order. He was sentenced to serve 120 days in jail and three years of probation after release.

== Championships and accomplishments ==
=== Mixed martial arts ===
- Ultimate Fighting Championship
  - The Ultimate Fighter Season 1 Semi-Finalist
  - Knockout of the Night (Four times) vs. Jorge Santiago, Terry Martin, Alessio Sakara, Aaron Simpson
  - Fight of the Night (Two times) vs. Kalib Starnes and Yoshihiro Akiyama
  - UFC Encyclopedia Awards
    - Fight of the Night (One time) vs. Patrick Côté
    - Knockout of the Night (One time) vs. Jorge Rivera
  - Fifth most bouts in UFC Middleweight division history (22)
  - Tied (Derek Brunson, Nate Marquardt & Brendan Allen) for third most finishes in UFC Middleweight division history (9)
  - Tied (Michael Bisping, Derek Brunson, Gregory Rodrigues & Yoel Romero) for fourth most knockouts in UFC Middleweight division history (7)
  - Second most total strikes landed in UFC Middleweight division history (1791)
  - Tied (Sean Strickland & Jean Silva) for third fastest turnaround to win two fights (14 days in 2010)
  - Fought in the First 5 Round Non-Title Main Event in UFC history
  - UFC.com Awards
    - 2007: Ranked #6 Knockout of the Year vs. Terry Martin
    - 2010: Ranked #10 Fighter of the Year (Tied with Evan Dunham & Rick Story), Half-Year Awards: Best Fight of the 1HY vs. Yoshihiro Akiyama & Ranked #2 Fight of the Year vs. Yoshihiro Akiyama
- World Extreme Cagefighting
  - WEC Middleweight Championship (One time, first)
- Gladiator Challenge
  - GC Middleweight Championship (One time)
- Sherdog and MMANews247.com
  - 2010 Comeback Fighter of the Year
- Cagewriters
  - 2010 Fight of the Year vs. Yoshihiro Akiyama at UFC 116
- Amateur titles
  - FCFF Middleweight Championship (One time)
  - UFCF Middleweight Championship (One time)

== Mixed martial arts record ==
Professional record breakdown
35 matches	23 wins	12 losses
By knockout	12	4
By submission	5	2
By decision	6	6

Res.	Record	Opponent	Method	Event	Date	Round	Time	Location	Notes
Win	23–12	Yoshihiro Akiyama	Decision (split)	Black Combat 17	November 21, 2026	3	5:00	Seoul, South Korea	Catchweight (196 lb.) bout.
Loss	22–12	Uriah Hall	TKO (retirement)	UFC 168	December 28, 2013	1	5:00	Las Vegas, Nevada, United States	
Loss	22–11	Andrew Craig	Decision (split)	UFC 162	July 6, 2013	3	5:00	Las Vegas, Nevada, United States	
Loss	22–10	Derek Brunson	Decision (unanimous)	UFC 155	December 29, 2012	3	5:00	Las Vegas, Nevada, United States	
Loss	22–9	Mark Muñoz	TKO (corner stoppage)	UFC 138	November 5, 2011	2	5:00	Birmingham, England	
Win	22–8	Wanderlei Silva	KO (punches)	UFC 132	July 2, 2011	1	0:27	Las Vegas, Nevada, United States	
Loss	21–8	Brian Stann	TKO (knee and punches)	UFC 125	January 1, 2011	1	3:37	Las Vegas, Nevada, United States	
Win	21–7	Yoshihiro Akiyama	Submission (triangle choke)	UFC 116	July 3, 2010	3	4:40	Las Vegas, Nevada, United States	Fight of the Night.
Win	20–7	Aaron Simpson	TKO (punches)	The Ultimate Fighter: Team Liddell vs. Team Ortiz Finale	June 19, 2010	2	4:17	Las Vegas, Nevada, United States	Knockout of the Night.
Win	19–7	Jay Silva	Decision (unanimous)	UFC Fight Night: Maynard vs. Diaz	January 11, 2010	3	5:00	Fairfax, Virginia, United States	
Loss	18–7	Jake Rosholt	Technical Submission (arm-triangle choke)	UFC 102	August 29, 2009	3	1:30	Portland, Oregon, United States	
Loss	18–6	Michael Bisping	Decision (unanimous)	UFC 89	October 18, 2008	3	5:00	Birmingham, England	
Win	18–5	Alessio Sakara	TKO (punches)	UFC 82	March 1, 2008	1	3:16	Columbus, Ohio, United States	Knockout of the Night.
Win	17–5	Terry Martin	KO (punch)	UFC Fight Night: Thomas vs. Florian	September 19, 2007	3	3:56	Las Vegas, Nevada, United States	Knockout of the Night.
Loss	16–5	Kalib Starnes	Decision (unanimous)	UFC 71	May 26, 2007	3	5:00	Las Vegas, Nevada, United States	Fight of the Night.
Loss	16–4	Jason MacDonald	Submission (guillotine choke)	UFC 66	December 30, 2006	2	4:03	Las Vegas, Nevada, United States	
Win	16–3	Jorge Santiago	KO (punch)	UFC Fight Night: Sanchez vs. Parisyan	August 17, 2006	2	0:35	Las Vegas, Nevada, United States	Knockout of the Night.
Loss	15–3	Anderson Silva	KO (knee)	UFC Ultimate Fight Night 5	June 28, 2006	1	0:49	Las Vegas, Nevada, United States	UFC Middleweight title eliminator.
Win	15–2	Luigi Fioravanti	Decision (unanimous)	UFC Ultimate Fight Night 4	April 6, 2006	3	5:00	Las Vegas, Nevada, United States	
Win	14–2	Jorge Rivera	TKO (punches)	UFC Ultimate Fight Night 3	January 16, 2006	1	1:44	Las Vegas, Nevada, United States	
Win	13–2	Edwin Dewees	Submission (armbar)	UFC Ultimate Fight Night 2	October 3, 2005	1	3:26	Las Vegas, Nevada, United States	
Win	12–2	Patrick Côté	Decision (split)	UFC Ultimate Fight Night	August 6, 2005	3	5:00	Las Vegas, Nevada, United States	
Win	11–2	Jason Thacker	TKO (punches)	The Ultimate Fighter 1 Finale	April 9, 2005	1	1:35	Las Vegas, Nevada, United States	
Win	10–2	Benji Radach	TKO (broken jaw)	SportFight 4	June 26, 2004	3	3:43	Gresham, Oregon, United States	Won the inaugural SportFight Middleweight Championship.
Loss	9–2	Joe Doerksen	Decision (unanimous)	Freestyle FC 9	May 14, 2004	3	5:00	Biloxi, Mississippi, United States	For the vacant FFC Middleweight Championship.
Win	9–1	Justin Davis	KO (punch)	SportFight 3	April 17, 2004	1	1:54	Gresham, Oregon, United States	
Win	8–1	Boyd Ballard	KO (punches)	United Full Contact Federation: Night of Champions 6	January 31, 2004	1	1:50	Lynnwood, Washington, United States	
Win	7–1	Mike Swick	KO (punch)	WEC 9	January 16, 2004	2	0:45	Lemoore, California, United States	Won the inaugural WEC Middleweight Championship.
Win	6–1	James Fanshier	Decision (unanimous)	Gladiator Challenge 20	November 13, 2003	3	5:00	Colusa, California, United States	Won the vacant GC Middleweight Championship.
Win	5–1	Brian Sleeman	Submission (armbar)	WEC 8	October 17, 2003	1	3:15	Lemoore, California, United States	
Win	4–1	Boyd Ballard	Submission (armbar)	United Full Contact Federation: Night of Champions 5	October 11, 2003	1	2:18	Lynnwood, Washington, United States	
Win	3–1	Landon Showalter	Decision (unanimous)	SportFight: Second Coming	August 23, 2003	3	5:00	Gresham, Oregon, United States	
Win	2–1	Otto Olson	KO (punch)	United Full Contact Federation: Battle in Seattle	July 26, 2003	1	2:01	Seattle, Washington, United States	
Loss	1–1	Paulo Gazze	Decision (unanimous)	Hitman Fight Productions 3	May 2, 2003	3	5:00	Santa Ana, California, United States	
Win	1–0	Bryce Hamilton	Submission (armbar)	United Full Contact Federation: Everett Extreme Challenge 6	November 9, 2002	1	2:45	Everett, Washington, United States	Middleweight debut.

== Bareknuckle boxing record ==
Professional record breakdown
4 matches	3 wins	1 loss
By knockout	3	0
By decision	0	1

Res.	Record	Opponent	Method	Event	Date	Round	Time	Location	Notes
Win	3–1	Quentin Henry	KO (punch)	BKFC Knucklemania	February 5, 2021	1	1:07	Miami, Florida, United States	Retired from combat sports post-bout.
Loss	2–1	Dakota Cochrane	Decision (unanimous)	BKFC 6	June 22, 2019	5	2:00	Tampa, Florida, United States	
Win	2–0	Justin Baesman	KO (punches)	BKFC 5	April 6, 2019	1	0:25	Biloxi, Mississippi, United States	
Win	1–0	Phil Baroni	TKO (punch)	World Bare Knuckle Fighting Federation	November 9, 2018	1	1:19	Casper, Wyoming, United States	

== See also ==
- List of current UFC fighters
- List of male mixed martial artists
- List of World Extreme Cagefighting champions

== Notes and references ==
New championship	1st WEC Middleweight Champion; January 16, 2004 – January 2005	Vacant Title next held by Joe Riggs
