= UFC 60 =

UFC mixed martial arts event in 2006

UFC 60: Hughes vs. Gracie
- The poster for UFC 60: Hughes vs. Gracie
- Promotion: Ultimate Fighting Championship
- Date: May 27, 2006
- Venue: Staples Center
- City: Los Angeles, California
- Attendance: 14,802 (10,347 paid)
- Total gate: $2,900,090
- Buyrate: 620,000

Event chronology
UFC 59: Reality Check	UFC 60: Hughes vs. Gracie	The Ultimate Fighter: Team Ortiz vs. Team Shamrock Finale

UFC 60: Hughes vs. Gracie was a mixed martial arts event held by the Ultimate Fighting Championship on May 27, 2006. The event took place at the Staples Center, in Los Angeles, California and was broadcast live on pay-per-view in the United States and Canada.

== Background ==
Headlining the card was a non-title catchweight (175 lb) match between then-current UFC Welterweight Champion Matt Hughes, and UFC Hall of Famer Royce Gracie, the winner of UFC 1, UFC 2 and UFC 4. This was Gracie's first match in the UFC and in the United States since UFC 5.

The event drew 620,000 buys, becoming the best-selling pay-per-view in UFC history up to that point, and the first to break the $20 million mark in gross PPV sales.

== Results ==
Main Card
Weight class				Method	Round	Time	Notes
Catchweight (175 lb)	Matt Hughes	def.	Royce Gracie	TKO (punches)	1	4:39
Light Heavyweight	Dean Lister	def.	Alessio Sakara	Submission (triangle choke)	1	2:20
Welterweight	Diego Sanchez	def.	John Alessio	Decision (unanimous) (30–27, 29–28, 29–28)	3	5:00
Heavyweight	Brandon Vera	def.	Assuério Silva	Submission (guillotine choke)	1	2:39
Middleweight	Mike Swick	def.	Joe Riggs	Submission (guillotine choke)	1	2:19
Preliminary Card
Middleweight	Jeremy Horn	def.	Chael Sonnen	Submission (armbar)	2	1:17	(Note: Sonnen was a late replacement for Evan Tanner, who reportedly withdrew due to personal issues.)
Lightweight	Spencer Fisher	def.	Matt Wiman	KO (flying knee)	2	1:43	(Note: Wiman replaced Leonard Garcia, who broke his leg in training.)
Heavyweight	Gabriel Gonzaga	def.	Fabiano Scherner	TKO (punches)	2	0:24
Lightweight	Melvin Guillard	def.	Rick Davis	KO (punch)	1	1:37

== Reported Payout ==
Royce Gracie: $400,000

Matt Hughes: $110,000

Jeremy Horn: $70,000

Brandon Vera: $32,000

Diego Sanchez: $24,000

Mike Swick: $14,000

Spencer Fisher: $14,000

Joe Riggs: $12,000

Gabriel Gonzaga: $10,000

Melvin Guillard: $10,000

Alessio Sakara: $10,000

Dean Lister: $10,000

Assuerio Silva: $8,000

Chael Sonnen: $5,000

Fabiano Scherner: $3,000

Matt Wiman: $3,000

John Alessio: $3,000

Rick Davis: $2,000

Disclosed Fighter Payroll: $740,000

== Encyclopedia awards ==
The following fighters were honored in the October 2011 book titled UFC Encyclopedia.

- Fight of the Night: Spencer Fisher vs. Matt Wiman
- Knockout of the Night: Melvin Guillard
- Submission of the Night: Mike Swick

== See also ==
- Ultimate Fighting Championship
- List of UFC champions
- List of UFC events
- 2006 in UFC
