= Melvin Guillard =

American mixed martial arts fighter

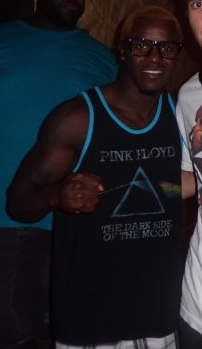
- Born: March 30, 1983 (age 43); New Orleans, Louisiana, United States
- Other names: The Young Assassin
- Height: 5 ft 9 in (1.75 m)
- Weight: 170 lb (77 kg; 12 st 2 lb)
- Division: Middleweight; Welterweight; Lightweight
- Reach: 71 in (180 cm)
- Stance: Orthodox
- Fighting out of: Denver, Colorado, United States
- Team: Jackson-Wink MMA (2009-2011); Blackzilians (2012-2013); Grudge Training Center (2013, 2016-present); American Top Team (2013-2016)
- Rank: Purple belt in Brazilian Jiu-Jitsu; Brown belt in Judo
- Years active: 2002–present

Professional boxing record
- Total: 2
- Losses: 1
- By knockout: 1
- Draws: 1

Mixed martial arts record
- Total: 62
- Wins: 33
- By knockout: 22
- By submission: 2
- By decision: 9
- Losses: 24
- By knockout: 7
- By submission: 10
- By decision: 7
- Draws: 2
- No contests: 3

Other information
- Boxing record from BoxRec
- Mixed martial arts record from Sherdog

Melvin Paul Guillard Jr.(born March 30, 1983) (known as Melvin Guillard) is an American mixed martial artist who retired September 2025. Guillard had compete in the Middleweight division, and most notably in the Lightweight division of the Ultimate Fighting Championship (UFC), Bellator MMA and World Series of Fighting. He debuted in the company on The Ultimate Fighter 2 television series, losing to Josh Burkman by decision in the first Welterweight elimination bout.

== Background ==
Born and raised in Louisiana, Guillard competed in various sports such as basketball before he began wrestling at Bonnabel High School. Guillard was talented, becoming a State Champion (152 lbs) in his senior year, winning the Class 5A MVP award, and also was a member of the Louisiana Junior National Team for two years. Guillard continued competing for one year at Colby Community College in Kansas and graduated with a degree in criminal law. Guillard had originally become drawn to mixed martial arts due to his wrestling coach's connections with the sport, and had the goal of fighting professionally by his early teens. By the time he was 16 years old, Guillard was preparing to fight professionally.

== Mixed martial arts career ==
=== Early career ===
In 2005, Guillard defeated fellow future UFC veteran Roger Huerta by decision, but the fight was ruled a No Contest after Huerta appealed the decision to the commission, accusing Guillard of greasing between rounds one and two.

=== The Ultimate Fighter 2 ===
Guillard participated in The Ultimate Fighter 2, but was eliminated from the competition after losing a unanimous decision to Josh Burkman. He returned on the season finale, defeating Marcus Davis by technical knockout due to a cut. Fighting again at Welterweight, Guillard lost his next fight to Josh Neer at UFC Ultimate Fight Night 3 on January 16, 2006 submitting to a first round triangle choke. Guillard had earlier opened a large cut on Neer's forehead. This fight earned him the first ever Fight of the Night award.

=== Ultimate Fighting Championship ===
After the lightweight division was reinstated at UFC 58, Guillard began to transition to this weight class. He made his UFC lightweight debut at UFC 60, defeating Rick Davis by first-round KO. At UFC 63 on September 23, 2006, Guillard fought former WEC lightweight champion Gabe Ruediger and won the fight via KO by a body blow. Guillard next fought Joe Stevenson in the main event of UFC Fight Night 9 and submitted to a guillotine choke 27 seconds into the fight, after being stunned by a punch. Guillard also submitted in his next fight, against Rich Clementi at UFC 79, to a rear naked choke at 4:40 of the first round. Before and after the bout, the fighters talked trash. Guillard gave Clementi the finger during the introductions and attempted to attack him after the fight, but was restrained by referee Herb Dean. He was subsequently released from the UFC, but was brought back after a win in a minor promotion.

Guillard returned to the UFC at UFC 86, knocking out Dennis Siver in 36 seconds and earning a Knockout of the Night bonus. He was slated to fight Spencer Fisher at UFC 90, but tore his ACL while training and was replaced by Shannon Gugerty.

Guillard next won a split decision over Gleison Tibau at The Ultimate Fighter: United States vs. United Kingdom Finale on June 20, 2009.

Guillard submitted to a guillotine choke by Nate Diaz on September 16, at UFC Fight Night: Diaz vs. Guillard.

On February 6, 2010, Guillard faced Ronys Torres at UFC 109. He joined coach Greg Jackson's camp in Albuquerque, New Mexico to prepare for the fight. He showed improved submission defense and patience in the fight, winning a close unanimous decision (29-28, 29-28, 29-28).

Guillard was scheduled to face Thiago Tavares at UFC 114, but Tavares was forced off the card with an elbow injury. Guillard instead fought and knocked out UFC newcomer Waylon Lowe in the first round.

On September 25, 2010, Guillard won a split decision over Jeremy Stephens at UFC 119.

Guillard was expected to face Yves Edwards on January 22, 2011, at UFC Fight Night 23. However, headliner Kenny Florian pulled out of his fight with Evan Dunham due to injury and Guillard replaced him. He defeated Dunham in the first round via TKO by knees. The finish earned him the Knockout of the Night award.

Guillard next defeated Shane Roller via first-round KO on July 2, 2011 at UFC 132.

Guillard faced Joe Lauzon on October 6, 2011 at UFC 136. Guillard was quickly submitted with a rear naked choke after being stunned by a counter left hook from Lauzon.

Guillard next faced Jim Miller in the main event of UFC on FX 1 on January 20, 2012. After dropping Miller in the early going, Guillard was submitted in the first round.

Guillard next fought Fabrício Camões on July 7, 2012 at UFC 148. He won the fight via unanimous decision.

Guillard fought Donald Cerrone on August 11, 2012 at UFC 150, and was knocked out early in the first round after clipping Cerrone with a big left hand. He received a $60,000 Fight of the Night bonus award for his effort. This was the first knockout loss of his career.

Guillard was scheduled to face Jamie Varner on December 15, 2012 at The Ultimate Fighter 16 Finale. However, Varner fell ill the day of the event and the bout was scrapped from the card. The bout with Varner was rescheduled for December 29, 2012 at UFC 155. Guillard was taken down by Varner several times in their bout, losing a split decision.

Guillard faced Mac Danzig on July 27, 2013 at UFC on Fox 8. He knocked Danzig out in the second round. The win earned Guillard his third Knockout of the Night bonus award.

Guillard faced Ross Pearson on October 26, 2013 at UFC Fight Night 30. The fight ended in a no contest when Pearson was deemed unable to continue after being cut on the forehead by an accidental illegal knee. As a result of the controversial result, a rematch was booked for UFC Fight Night 37 at March 8, 2014 in London. However, Pearson pulled out of the fight due to injury and was replaced by Michael Johnson. Guillard lost the lackluster fight via unanimous decision and was subsequently released from the promotion.

=== World Series of Fighting ===
On April 7, 2014, World Series of Fighting executive vice president Ali Abdel-Aziz confirmed Guillard had signed a multi-fight contract.

Guillard made his debut at WSOF 11 on July 5, 2014 against Gesias Cavalcante. He won the fight via TKO in the second round.

Guillard was expected to challenge Justin Gaethje for his WSOF Lightweight championship on November 15, 2014 at WSOF 15. However, Guillard missed weight for the bout and it was changed to a catchweight affair. Guillard lost the fight via split decision.

On April 30, 2015 Melvin was released by the World Series of Fighting. His manager, Malki Kawa, announced the news on Twitter: "I just received what I asked for from WSOF which is the release for [Melvin]... Should have a new home for him shortly".

=== Bellator MMA ===
On May 4, 2015, Bellator MMA president Scott Coker announced Melvin's signing in a press release, stating "We are excited to have Melvin coming onboard."

In his debut fight for the promotion, Guillard was given the chance to face a hand picked opponent and chose Brandon Girtz, who he fought at Bellator 141 on August 28, 2015. His decision to face Girtz ended up backfiring on him as he lost the fight via split decision.

In his second fight for the promotion, Guillard faced Derek Campos on February 19, 2016 at Bellator 149. He lost the fight via knockout in the second round.

In his third fight for the promotion, Guillard faced David Rickels on July 21, 2016 at Bellator 159. Guillard earned his first win in Bellator via a series of elbows and punches to defeat Rickels via KO in the first round. The win was overturned after Guillard tested positive for a non-performance-enhancing banned substance. Guillard was subsequently suspended for one year by the Kansas Athletic Commission. After agreeing to enter rehab and completing the program, Guillard's suspension was subsequently reduced to six months.

Guillard faced Chidi Njokuani in the main event at Bellator 171 on January 27, 2017. He lost the fight by unanimous decision.

=== Rizin FF ===
In July 2018, Guillard faced Takanori Gomi at Rizin 11. He missed weight for the fight and lost by knockout at 2:33 in the first round. Guillard alleges that Rizin officials altered the rules of his match before the fight, telling him that for his match he would not be allowed to use either soccer kicks or knees to the head of a grounded opponent, forcing to him to change his planned strategy and his attire, putting on wrestling shoes. Guillard suspects that individuals were trying to possibly 'protect' Gomi.

=== Regional promotions ===
After the lone bout in Rizin, Guillard faced Terry House Jr. at United Combat League 32 on October 18, 2019. He lost the fight via unanimous decision.

Guillard was next expected to face Erick Lozano at Lights Out 7 on February 8, 2020. However, the bout never materialized for unknown reasons.

== Bare-knuckle boxing ==
=== BKB ===
On April 22, 2017, Guillard took part in a bare knuckle boxing event for Bare Knuckle Boxing in England. He faced Dan Breeze at BKB 5 and won the fight via KO after Dan Breeze failed to respond in time to the 10 count. He expressed before the fight he wanted to fight BKB's undefeated, and biggest star, Middleweight Champion Jimmy "Celtic Warrior" Sweeney, and after the fight on 2 separate occasions nearly got into a fight with Sweeney and his entourage, even grabbing a butter knife at one point, with fellow former UFC fighters Shonie Carter, who recorded the altercation, and Wes Sims present at the scene.

At BKB 6 on July 1, 2017 Guillard faced the "Undisputed King of Bare Knuckle" and its #1 star, Jimmy "Celtic Warrior" Sweeney. The fight was held at 12 stone (168 lbs). Guillard lost the bout by unanimous decision.

Guillard had a rematch with Sweeney on September 9, 2017 at BKB 7. He again lost the bout by unanimous decision.

Guillard fought again on November 4, 2017 against Leighton Brady, who stepped in on four days notice after Guillard's original opponent dropped out. Although dropped almost immediately at the beginning of the fight, Guillard came back and dropped his opponent several times, finally dropping Brady a final time in the third round, winning by TKO after Brady failed to get up in time for the 10 count. Guillard expressed in the post-fight interview he wanted a title shot in BKB at Lightweight.

=== Bare Knuckle Fighting Championship ===
After the four-fight stint in BKB, Guillard made his promotional debut in BKFC against Isaac Vallie-Flagg at BKFC 7 on August 10, 2019. He lost the fight via technical knockout due to a hand injury that rendered him unable to continue after the third round.

In his sophomore bout he faced Scott O'Shaughnessy at BKFC 16 on March 16, 2021. He lost the fight via first-minute knockout.

He then faced Harris Stephenson at BKFC 20 on August 20, 2021. He lost the fight via disqualification in the second round due to an illegal blow that was ruled an intentional foul.

Guillard faced Joe Riggs at BKFC Fight Night 1 on October 9, 2021. He lost the fight via first-minute knockout, incurring significant facial fractures.

On January 27, 2020, The Association of Boxing Commissions issued a news release concerning Guillard's expected fight at the BKFC: Knucklemania 2 event to take place on Feb 19 2020. In the release they stated that Florida Athletic Commission Executive Director Patrick Cunningham had announced that the FAC had denied BKFC’s bout proposal for a matchup between Guillard and Ulysses Diaz due to “serious health concern" with respect to Melvin Guillard.

Following his retirement, Guillard wrote on Facebook: "Went out the way I came in just as I Manifested!!! It's been and amazing career will always go out on top of the world. For all my HATERS I appreciate your HATEFUL WAYS all Love......YA OUT!!!!!"

== Personal life ==
Guillard is married. He is a playable character in the UFC Undisputed 3 video game.

=== Substance abuse and family ===
Guillard fought The Ultimate Fighter 2 winner Joe Stevenson in the main event of UFC Fight Night: Stevenson vs Guillard on April 5, 2007, and submitted to a guillotine choke in 27 seconds after being dropped by a jab. He publicly accused Stevenson of using Human Growth Hormone (HGH). Guillard's own pre-fight urine sample later tested positive for cocaine. The Nevada State Athletic Commission subsequently suspended Guillard for eight months and fined him $2,100. Melvin attributed his drug abuse to the death of his father at age 44, from cirrhosis after a life of heavy drinking.

He later said, "I made a lot of excuses for myself because of my father's death, and I regret it now because my father left me and he always told me, 'Son, never live a regret. Never make excuses for yourself. Be a man and take responsibility for whatever you do in life.'" He has said his dad was his best friend and biggest fan, and never missed watching him fight. However, after Hurricane Katrina, his dad (a contractor) was backed up with work and so didn't make it to Guillard's UFC debut. He died before he could ever watch him fight in the UFC.

=== Legal troubles ===
In September 2018, news surfaced that Guillard was facing four felony charges stemming from two separate incidents: domestic violence against his girlfriend and an assault at a Denver bar. Subsequently it was revealed that there were two separate incidents in Denver bars, in June and September 2018. For the bar incidents, Guillard was eventually charged with six charges, including multiple felony assaults. He made a deal with the prosecutor for misdemeanor assault and was jailed. He was released in July 2019 with two years of probation.

In August 2019, news surfaced that Guillard was to appear at a court hearing on August 28, 2019, regarding the domestic violence incident, facing a second degree assault and a third degree assault charges.

== Championships and accomplishments ==
- Ultimate Fighting Championship
  - Knockout of the Night (Three times) vs. Dennis Siver, Evan Dunham & Mac Danzig
  - Fight of the Night (Two times) vs. Josh Neer & Donald Cerrone
  - UFC Encyclopedia Awards
    - Knockout of the Night (One time) vs. Rick Davis
  - Tied (Edson Barboza & Justin Gaethje) for third most knockout victories in UFC Lightweight division history (7)
  - Tied (Michael Johnson) for most knockdowns landed in UFC Lightweight division history (13)

== Mixed martial arts record ==
Professional record breakdown
62 matches	33 wins	24 losses
By knockout	22	7
By submission	2	10
By decision	9	7
Draws	2	
No contests	3	

Res.	Record	Opponent	Method	Event	Date	Round	Time	Location	Notes
Win	33–24–2 (3)	Terry Wiggins	TKO (knee and punches)	Ragin FC 3	September 20, 2025	1	0:27	Lake Charles, Louisiana, United States	
Loss	32–24–2 (3)	Isaac Moreno	TKO (punches and elbows)	Fury FC 106	July 18, 2025	2	4:28	Westwego, Louisiana, United States	
Loss	32–23–2 (3)	Josiah Harrell	Submission (rear-naked choke)	Ohio Combat League 38	May 17, 2025	1	3:25	Newport, Kentucky, United States	
Loss	32–22–2 (3)	Terry House Jr.	Decision (unanimous)	United Combat League 32	October 18, 2019	3	5:00	Hammond, Indiana, United States	Return to Welterweight.
Loss	32–21–2 (3)	Takanori Gomi	KO (punches)	Rizin 11	July 29, 2018	1	2:33	Saitama, Japan	Catchweight (163 lb) bout; Guillard missed weight.
Loss	32–20–2 (3)	Maurice Jackson	TKO (punches)	Sparta Combat League 65	February 10, 2018	2	1:50	Denver, Colorado, United States	
Loss	32–19–2 (3)	Israel Adesanya	TKO (punches)	Australian FC 20	July 28, 2017	1	4:48	Melbourne, Australia	Middleweight debut. For the vacant Australian FC Middleweight Championship.
Loss	32–18–2 (3)	Muslim Salikhov	KO (spinning hook kick)	Kunlun Fight MMA 12	June 1, 2017	1	1:33	Yantai, China	Welterweight bout; Guillard missed weight (181 lb).
Loss	32–17–2 (3)	Chidi Njokuani	Decision (unanimous)	Bellator 171	January 27, 2017	3	5:00	Mulvane, Kansas, United States	Catchweight (179 lb) bout.
NC	32–16–2 (3)	David Rickels	NC (overturned)	Bellator 159	July 22, 2016	1	2:14	Mulvane, Kansas, United States	Catchweight (158 lb) bout; Guillard missed weight. Originally a KO (punches and elbows) win for Guillard, overturned after he tested positive for a banned substance.
Loss	32–16–2 (2)	Derek Campos	KO (punches)	Bellator 149	February 19, 2016	2	0:32	Houston, Texas, United States	
Loss	32–15–2 (2)	Brandon Girtz	Decision (split)	Bellator 141	August 28, 2015	3	5:00	Temecula, California, United States	
Loss	32–14–2 (2)	Justin Gaethje	Decision (split)	WSOF 15	November 15, 2014	3	5:00	Tampa, Florida, United States	Non-title bout; Guillard missed weight (158.6 lb).
Win	32–13–2 (2)	Gesias Cavalcante	TKO (punches and elbows)	WSOF 11	July 5, 2014	2	2:36	Daytona Beach, Florida, United States	Catchweight (159.4 lb) bout; Guillard missed weight.
Loss	31–13–2 (2)	Michael Johnson	Decision (unanimous)	UFC Fight Night: Gustafsson vs. Manuwa	March 8, 2014	3	5:00	London, England	
NC	31–12–2 (2)	Ross Pearson	NC (illegal knee)	UFC Fight Night: Machida vs. Munoz	October 26, 2013	1	1:57	Manchester, England	Accidental illegal knee rendered Pearson unable to continue.
Win	31–12–2 (1)	Mac Danzig	KO (punches)	UFC on Fox: Johnson vs. Moraga	July 27, 2013	2	2:47	Seattle, Washington, United States	Knockout of the Night.
Loss	30–12–2 (1)	Jamie Varner	Decision (split)	UFC 155	December 29, 2012	3	5:00	Las Vegas, Nevada, United States	
Loss	30–11–2 (1)	Donald Cerrone	KO (head kick and punch)	UFC 150	August 11, 2012	1	1:16	Denver, Colorado, United States	Catchweight (157.5 lb) bout; Guillard missed weight. Fight of the Night.
Win	30–10–2 (1)	Fabrício Camões	Decision (unanimous)	UFC 148	July 7, 2012	3	5:00	Las Vegas, Nevada, United States	
Loss	29–10–2 (1)	Jim Miller	Submission (rear-naked choke)	UFC on FX: Guillard vs. Miller	January 20, 2012	1	3:04	Nashville, Tennessee, United States	
Loss	29–9–2 (1)	Joe Lauzon	Submission (rear-naked choke)	UFC 136	October 8, 2011	1	0:47	Houston, Texas, United States	
Win	29–8–2 (1)	Shane Roller	KO (punches)	UFC 132	July 2, 2011	1	2:12	Las Vegas, Nevada, United States	
Win	28–8–2 (1)	Evan Dunham	TKO (knees)	UFC: Fight For The Troops 2	January 22, 2011	1	2:58	Fort Hood, Texas, United States	Knockout of the Night.
Win	27–8–2 (1)	Jeremy Stephens	Decision (split)	UFC 119	September 25, 2010	3	5:00	Indianapolis, Indiana, United States	
Win	26–8–2 (1)	Waylon Lowe	TKO (knee to the body)	UFC 114	May 29, 2010	1	3:28	Las Vegas, Nevada, United States	
Win	25–8–2 (1)	Ronys Torres	Decision (unanimous)	UFC 109	February 6, 2010	3	5:00	Las Vegas, Nevada, United States	
Loss	24–8–2 (1)	Nate Diaz	Submission (guillotine choke)	UFC Fight Night: Diaz vs. Guillard	September 16, 2009	2	2:13	Oklahoma City, Oklahoma, United States	
Win	24–7–2 (1)	Gleison Tibau	Decision (split)	The Ultimate Fighter: United States vs. United Kingdom Finale	June 20, 2009	3	5:00	Las Vegas, Nevada, United States	
Win	23–7–2 (1)	Dennis Siver	TKO (punches)	UFC 86	July 5, 2008	1	0:36	Las Vegas, Nevada, United States	Knockout of the Night.
Win	22–7–2 (1)	Eric Regan	Decision (unanimous)	Rage in the Cage 105	March 7, 2008	3	3:00	Phoenix, Arizona, United States	
Loss	21–7–2 (1)	Rich Clementi	Submission (rear-naked choke)	UFC 79	December 29, 2007	1	4:40	Las Vegas, Nevada, United States	
Loss	21–6–2 (1)	Joe Stevenson	Submission (guillotine choke)	UFC Fight Night: Stevenson vs. Guillard	April 5, 2007	1	0:27	Las Vegas, Nevada, United States	Guillard tested positive for benzoylecgonine.
Win	21–5–2 (1)	Gabe Ruediger	KO (punch to the body)	UFC 63	September 23, 2006	2	1:01	Anaheim, California, United States	
Win	20–5–2 (1)	Rick Davis	KO (punch)	UFC 60	May 27, 2006	1	1:37	Los Angeles, California, United States	Return to Lightweight.
Loss	19–5–2 (1)	Josh Neer	Submission (triangle choke)	UFC Ultimate Fight Night 3	January 16, 2006	1	4:20	Las Vegas, Nevada, United States	Fight of the Night.
Win	19–4–2 (1)	Marcus Davis	TKO (doctor stoppage)	The Ultimate Fighter 2 Finale	November 5, 2005	2	2:55	Las Vegas, Nevada, United States	Welterweight debut.
NC	18–4–2 (1)	Roger Huerta	NC (overturned)	Freestyle FC 14	March 5, 2005	3	5:00	Biloxi, Mississippi, United States	Originally a unanimous decision win for Guillard; overturned due to Guillard greasing between rounds.
Win	18–4–2	Peter Kaljevic	TKO (elbows)	Freestyle FC 14	March 5, 2005	1	2:24	Biloxi, Mississippi, United States	
Win	17–4–2	Darrell Smith	TKO (punches)	Freestyle FC 14	March 5, 2005	1	3:07	Biloxi, Mississippi, United States	
Win	16–4–2	Rob Emerson	Decision (split)	Reality Combat Fighting: Cold Hearted	February 19, 2005	3	5:00	Biloxi, Mississippi, United States	
Loss	15–4–2	Santino Defranco	Submission (triangle choke)	Fight Party: Domination at the DAC	November 20, 2004	1	2:33	Atlanta, Georgia, United States	
Win	15–3–2	Jason Hathaway	TKO (punches)	Fight Party: Compound Fracture	October 15, 2004	1	0:37	Atlanta, Georgia, United States	
Draw	14–3–2	LaVerne Clark	Draw	Reality Combat Fighting: Duel in the Delta	September 25, 2004	3	5:00	Tunica, Mississippi, United States	
Win	14–3–1	Angel Nievens	Decision (unanimous)	Freestyle FC 11	September 10, 2004	3	5:00	Biloxi, Mississippi, United States	
Loss	13–3–1	Ryan Stout	Submission (armbar)	Battle of New Orleans 14	July 10, 2004	1	2:55	New Orleans, Louisiana, United States	
Draw	13–2–1	Lee King	Draw	Battle of New Orleans 13	June 25, 2004	3	5:00	New Orleans, Louisiana, United States	
Win	13–2	Rich Miller	TKO (punches)	Extreme Challenge 58	June 11, 2004	2	2:07	Medina, Minnesota, United States	
Win	12–2	Kyle Bradley	TKO (punches)	Freestyle FC 9	May 14, 2004	1	4:20	Biloxi, Mississippi, United States	
Loss	11–2	Jake Short	Decision (unanimous)	Freestyle FC 8	March 5, 2004	3	5:00	Biloxi, Mississippi, United States	
Loss	11–1	Carlo Prater	Submission (guillotine choke)	Freestyle FC 7	December 19, 2003	1	2:32	Biloxi, Mississippi, United States	
Win	11–0	Justin Wieman	TKO (punches)	Fight Party: Anarchy in August	August 2, 2003	2	N/A	Atlanta, Georgia, United States	
Win	10–0	Kyle Bradley	Submission (armbar)	Freestyle FC 6	July 11, 2003	1	2:54	Biloxi, Mississippi, United States	
Win	9–0	Paul Purcell	TKO (punches)	Art of War 2	June 21, 2003	1	N/A	Kalispell, Montana, United States	
Win	8–0	Diego Saraiva	KO (punches)	Fight Party: May Madness In Midtown	May 23, 2003	1	N/A	Atlanta, Georgia, United States	
Win	7–0	Alex Kronofsky	KO (punch)	Battle of New Orleans 6	April 26, 2003	1	1:32	New Orleans, Louisiana, United States	
Win	6–0	Aaron Williams	TKO (punches)	Freestyle FC 5	April 25, 2003	1	1:43	Biloxi, Mississippi, United States	
Win	5–0	Victor Estrada	Submission (armbar)	Battle of New Orleans 5	March 22, 2003	1	2:04	New Orleans, Louisiana, United States	
Win	4–0	Rod Ramirez	TKO (punches)	Battle of New Orleans 4	February 15, 2003	2	0:32	New Orleans, Louisiana, United States	
Win	3–0	Joe Jordan	Decision (unanimous)	Battle of New Orleans 3	January 18, 2003	2	5:00	New Orleans, Louisiana, United States	
Win	2–0	Jonathon Hargroder	KO (punch)	Battle of New Orleans 2	December 21, 2002	1	0:31	New Orleans, Louisiana, United States	
Win	1–0	Calvin Martin	Decision (unanimous)	Battle of New Orleans 1	November 16, 2002	2	5:00	New Orleans, Louisiana, United States	

== Bare-knuckle boxing record ==
Professional record breakdown
8 matches	2 wins	6 losses
By knockout	2	3
By decision	0	2
By disqualification	0	1

Res.	Record	Opponent	Method	Event	Date	Round	Time	Location	Notes
Loss	2–6	Joe Riggs	KO (punch)	BKFC Fight Night Montana: Riggs vs. Guillard	October 9, 2021	1	0:59	Billings, Montana, United States	
Loss	2–5	Harris Stephenson	DQ (intentional foul)	BKFC 20	August 20, 2021	2	0:15	Biloxi, Mississippi, United States	
Loss	2–4	Scott O’Shaughnessy	TKO (punches)	BKFC 16	March 16, 2021	1	0:46	Biloxi, Mississippi, United States	
Loss	2–3	Isaac Vallie-Flagg	TKO (hand injury)	BKFC 7	August 10, 2019	3	2:00	Biloxi, Mississippi, United States	Broken hand rendered Guillard unable to continue.
Win	2–2	Leighton Brady	KO (unable to answer count)	BKB 8	November 4, 2017	3	0:40	Coventry, England, United Kingdom	
Loss	1–2	Jimmy Sweeney	Decision (unanimous)	BKB 7	September 9, 2017	5	2:00	Liverpool, England, United Kingdom	For the BKB World Middleweight Championship.
Loss	1–1	Jimmy Sweeney	Decision (unanimous)	BKB 6	July 1, 2017	5	2:00	London, England, United Kingdom	Guillard missed weight (168 lbs). Still remained a title fight for the BKB World Middleweight Championship.
Win	1–0	Dan Breeze	KO (Unable to Answer Count)	BKB 5	April 22, 2017	2	N/A	Coventry, England, United Kingdom	

== See also ==
- List of Bellator MMA alumni
- List of mixed martial artists with professional boxing records
