= UFC 63 =

UFC mixed martial arts event in 2006

UFC 63: Hughes vs. Penn 2
- The poster for UFC 63: Hughes vs. Penn 2
- Promotion: Ultimate Fighting Championship
- Date: September 23, 2006
- Venue: Arrowhead Pond
- City: Anaheim, California
- Attendance: 12,604 (9,343 paid)
- Total gate: $1,582,370
- Buyrate: 400,000
- Total purse: $332,000 (disclosed only)

Event chronology
| UFC 62: Liddell vs. Sobral 2 | UFC 63: Hughes vs. Penn 2 | Ortiz vs. Shamrock 3: The Final Chapter |

UFC 63: Hughes vs. Penn 2 was a mixed martial arts (MMA) event held by the Ultimate Fighting Championship on September 23, 2006. The event took place at the Arrowhead Pond in Anaheim, California and was broadcast live on pay-per-view (PPV) in the United States and Canada.

== Background ==
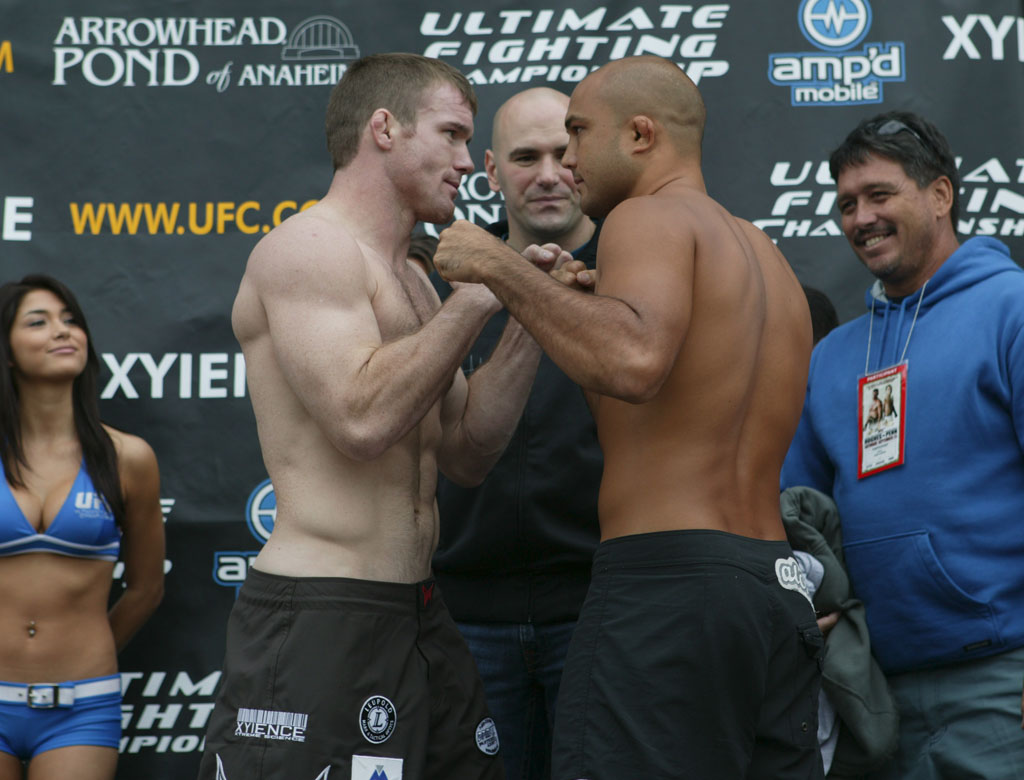
Matt Hughes and BJ Penn at the weigh-ins.

The event, originally subtitled "Hughes vs. St-Pierre," was scheduled to feature a UFC Welterweight Title match between champion Matt Hughes and Georges St-Pierre. Nevertheless, a groin injury—which was reported early in August, forced St-Pierre off the card. At first, St-Pierre sought a physiotherapist, hoping the injury would heal on its own during training; however, it was later announced that St-Pierre would indeed withdraw from his long-awaited title shot. Taking his place was former UFC Welterweight Champion, B.J. Penn, who defeated Hughes in a championship fight in 2004, and was beaten by St-Pierre at UFC 58. In fact, the Penn loss was Hughes' only defeat in his last twenty fights.

The Quad-City Times reported that Pat Miletich expressed outrage that the UFC had apparently scheduled this event alongside a bout he had forthcoming in the IFL, which caused him to miss cornering Hughes and Pulver, fighters whom he coaches, in their UFC matches.

== Results ==
Main Card
| Weight class | | | | Method | Round | Time | Notes |
|---|---|---|---|---|---|---|---|
| Welterweight | Matt Hughes (c) | def. | B.J. Penn | TKO (punches) | 3 | 3:53 | (Note: For the UFC Welterweight Championship) |
| Middleweight | Mike Swick | def. | David Loiseau | Decision (unanimous) (29–28, 29–28, 29–28) | 3 | 5:00 |
| Lightweight | Melvin Guillard | def. | Gabe Ruediger | TKO (punch to the body) | 2 | 1:01 |
| Light Heavyweight | Rashad Evans | def. | Jason Lambert | KO (punches) | 2 | 2:22 |
| Lightweight | Joe Lauzon | def. | Jens Pulver | KO (punch) | 1 | 0:48 |
Preliminary Card
| Lightweight | Roger Huerta | def. | Jason Dent | Decision (unanimous) (30–27, 30–27, 30–27) | 3 | 5:00 | (Note: Dent came as a late replacement for Jason Reinhardt, who had pulled out of the card due to lingering medical concerns with his neck. This preliminary bout was not aired on the broadcast.) |
| Heavyweight | Eddie Sanchez | def. | Mario Neto | KO (punches) | 2 | 0:17 |
| Lightweight | Jorge Gurgel | def. | Danny Abbadi | Decision (split) (28–29, 29–28, 29–28) | 3 | 5:00 | (Note: This preliminary bout was not aired on the broadcast.) |
| Lightweight | Tyson Griffin | def. | David Lee | Submission (rear-naked choke) | 1 | 1:50 |

== Bonus awards ==
- Fight of the Night: Matt Hughes vs. B.J. Penn and Roger Huerta vs. Jason Dent
- Knockout of the Night: Joe Lauzon
- Submission of the Night: Tyson Griffin

== Penn vs Hughes aftermath ==
At the post-fight interview, after Penn left the cage, St-Pierre stepped into the ring to hype up his upcoming title bout against Hughes, stating that he was glad that Hughes won his fight, but that he was "not impressed by [Hughes'] performance".

According to both commentator Joe Rogan and Hughes' own autobiography, Hughes was unhappy with St-Pierre's statement. Hughes said that they "had words" off-camera shortly after, at which time St-Pierre apologized, saying he had misunderstood something Hughes had said on the microphone and did not mean to offend him.

== See also ==
- Ultimate Fighting Championship
- List of UFC champions
- List of UFC events
- 2006 in UFC
