= UFC 57 =

UFC mixed martial arts event in 2006

UFC 57: Liddell vs. Couture 3
- The poster for UFC 57: Liddell vs. Couture 3
- Promotion: Ultimate Fighting Championship
- Date: February 4, 2006
- Venue: Mandalay Bay Events Center
- City: Las Vegas, Nevada
- Attendance: 11,000 (Paid: 10,301)
- Total gate: $3,382,400
- Buyrate: 400,000

Event chronology
Ultimate Fight Night 3	UFC 57: Liddell vs. Couture 3	UFC 58: USA vs Canada

UFC 57: Liddell vs. Couture 3 was a mixed martial arts event held by the Ultimate Fighting Championship on February 4, 2006. It was held at the Mandalay Bay Events Center on the Las Vegas Strip in Nevada, and broadcast live on pay-per-view in the United States.

Headlining the card was an anticipated rubber match between top UFC stars and former coaches of The Ultimate Fighter Chuck Liddell and Randy Couture, widely touted and marketed as MMA's first major trilogy.

It was the UFC's largest grossing gate to date, $3.3 million, in addition to an estimate of over 400,000 pay-per-view buys. The disclosed fighter payroll for the event was $667,000.

== Results ==
Main Card
Weight class				Method	Round	Time	Notes
Light Heavyweight	Chuck Liddell (c)	def.	Randy Couture	KO (punch)	2	1:28	(Note: For the UFC Light Heavyweight Championship. Couture announced his retirement after the loss.)
Heavyweight	Brandon Vera	def.	Justin Eilers	KO (head kick and knee)	1	1:25
Heavyweight	Marcio Cruz	def.	Frank Mir	TKO (punches and elbows)	1	4:10
Light Heavyweight	Renato Sobral	def.	Mike Van Arsdale	Submission (rear-naked choke)	1	2:21
Welterweight	Joe Riggs	def.	Nick Diaz	Decision (unanimous) (29–28, 29–28, 30–27)	3	5:00
Preliminary Card
Light Heavyweight	Alessio Sakara	def.	Elvis Sinosic	Decision (unanimous) (29–25, 29–26, 29–26)	3	5:00	(Note: Sakara got a point deduction for an illegal vertical elbow to the head of Elvis Sinosic. This match was a preliminary match and was not aired on the pay-per-view broadcast.)
Heavyweight	Paul Buentello	def.	Gilbert Aldana	TKO (punches)	2	2:27
Heavyweight	Jeff Monson	def.	Branden Lee Hinkle	Technical Submission (north-south choke)	1	4:35
Light Heavyweight	Keith Jardine	def.	Mike Whitehead	Decision (unanimous) (29–28, 29–28, 29–28)	3	5:00	(Note: This match was a preliminary match and was not aired on the pay-per-view broadcast.)

== Reported payout ==
Chuck Liddell: $250,000

Randy Couture: $225,000

Renato "Babalu" Sobral: $32,000

Frank Mir: $26,000

Paul Buentello: $22,000

Joe Riggs: $20,000

Mike Van Arsdale: $16,000

Keith Jardine: $10,000

Nick Diaz: $10,000

Alessio Sakara: $10,000

Brandon Vera: $10,000

Marcio Cruz: $8,000

Elvis Sinosic: $6,000

Jeff Monson: $6,000

Mike Whitehead: $5,000

Justin Eilers: $5,000

Branden Lee Hinkle: $4,000

Gilbert Aldana: $2,000

Disclosed Fighter Payroll: $667,000

== Encyclopedia awards ==
The following fighters were honored in the October 2011 book titled UFC Encyclopedia.

- Fight of the Night: Chuck Liddell vs. Randy Couture
- Knockout of the Night: Chuck Liddell
- Submission of the Night: Jeff Monson

== See also ==
- List of UFC champions
- List of UFC events
- 2006 in UFC
