= Rousimar Palhares =

Brazilian mixed martial arts fighter

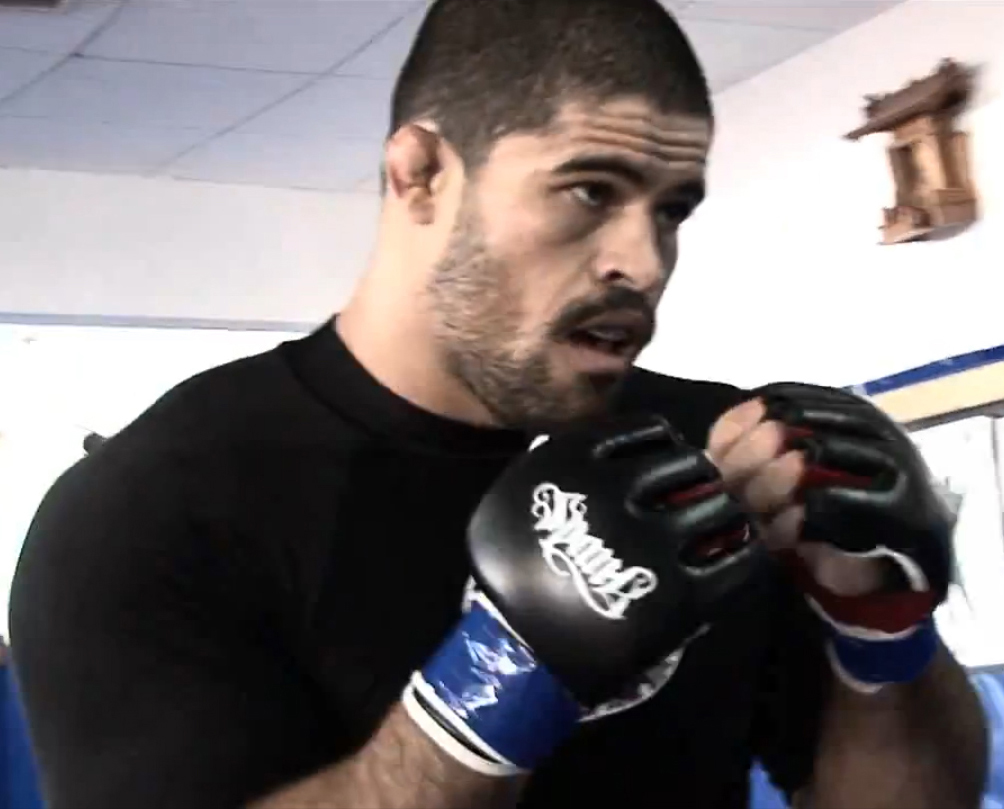
- Born: February 20, 1980 (age 46); Dores do Indaiá, Brazil
- Other names: Toquinho
- Height: 5 ft 8 in (1.73 m)
- Weight: 170 lb (77 kg; 12 st)
- Division: Welterweight (2013–present); Middleweight (2007–2012); Light Heavyweight (2006–2007)
- Reach: 71 in (180 cm)
- Stance: Orthodox
- Fighting out of: Rio de Janeiro, Brazil
- Team: Pantera Negra (formerly); Brazilian Top Team (2005–2013); Team Nogueira (2013–present)
- Rank: 2nd degree black belt in Brazilian Jiu-Jitsu under Murilo Bustamante; 1st degree black belt in Luta Livre
- Years active: 2006–present

Mixed martial arts record
- Total: 33
- Wins: 19
- By submission: 16
- By decision: 3
- Losses: 13
- By knockout: 9
- By decision: 4
- Draws: 1

Other information
- Mixed martial arts record from Sherdog

Rousimar Palhares
Medal record

Representing Brazil

Men's Grappling

ADCC Submission Wrestling World Championship
Silver medal – second place	2011 Nottingham	-88kg

Rousimar Palhares (Portuguese pronunciation: [ʁowziˈmaʁ paˈʎaɾiʃ];, born February 20, 1980) is a Brazilian mixed martial artist. A professional competitor since 2006, he has competed for the Ultimate Fighting Championship (UFC), World Series of Fighting (WSOF), Fight Nights Global (FNG), and Konfrontacja Sztuk Walki (KSW). His nickname Toquinho (Portuguese pronunciation: [toˈkĩɲu]), Portuguese for "little tree stump", comes from his short, stocky, heavily muscled build and the low success rate his opponents have had in grappling him down to the canvas. Palhares is primarily known for his powerful ground game. Of his 16 submission victories 12 have come from leg locks. He is also known for his refusal to release submission holds when either the opposing fighter has signaled submission or the referee has called a stop to the bout, causing him to be fired by the UFC and WSOF.

== Early life ==
Palhares grew up in abject poverty in the Brazilian countryside. He recalls working in the fields to help support his family as young as age seven and said that there were times where there was not enough food for everyone. He eventually had to leave his shanty and move underneath a local bridge in a tent city slum. Palhares began training in Brazilian jiu-jitsu at the age of 15, before moving to Rio de Janeiro to compete professionally.

He claimed the Fury Fighting Championship Middleweight Championship in December 2007 after defeating Flavio Mura, Pan-Am Jiu-Jitsu champion Fabio Negao, and Chute Boxe's Daniel Acacio in a tournament. Palhares earned his Brazilian Jiu-Jitsu black belt under former UFC Middleweight Champion Murilo Bustamante and Bebeo Duarte.

Having spent his entire early career competing in Brazil, Palhares's first bout outside his home country was in the United States at UFC 84. He is considered to be one of the best in the world at leg locks, such as the heel hook and kneebar. Palhares took 2nd place in the under 88 kg 2011 ADCC, finishing his first three opponents quickly with leg locks, before losing to established World Champion Andre Galvao in the final, by points.

== Mixed martial arts career ==
=== Ultimate Fighting Championship ===
==== Middleweight ====
Palhares debuted with the UFC against Ivan Salaverry on May 24, 2008 at UFC 84 and won the bout via an armbar submission in the first round. This fight earned him a $75,000 Submission of the Night award.

Palhares fought against former PRIDE Middleweight & Welterweight Champion Dan Henderson at UFC 88. Henderson defeated Palhares by unanimous decision handing Palhares his first loss in the UFC.

Palhares quickly rebounded from the loss to defeat veteran Jeremy Horn at UFC 93 by unanimous decision. Palhares was expected to face Italian Alessio Sakara on December 5, 2009, at The Ultimate Fighter 10 Finale, but due to an injury while training, Sakara had to withdraw. On December 12, 2009, at UFC 107 Palhares fought against Lucio Linhares and defeated Linhares by heel hook.

At UFC 111, Palhares defeated Tomasz Drwal by heel hook 45 seconds into the first round. He was, however, subsequently suspended for 90 days for continuing to crank the submission even after Drwal had tapped and referee Kevin Mulhall stepped in to stop the fight.

Palhares was expected to face Nate Marquardt on August 28, 2010, at UFC 118, however the bout was moved to September 15, 2010, to headline UFC Fight Night 22 after Alan Belcher was forced to pull out of his bout with Demian Maia with an eye injury. Marquardt defeated Palhares via first round TKO. During the fight, Palhares claimed that Marquardt had greased his leg after failing to secure a leg lock on the ground. Marquardt attacked, catching Palhares off guard as he was complaining to the referee and won the fight through a ground-and-pound stoppage. Palhares would later apologize for his actions during the fight after it was determined by officials that Marquardt's leg was not greased.

Palhares was expected to face Alexandre Ferreira on March 3, 2011, at UFC Live: Sanchez vs. Kampmann. However, on January 18, Ferreira was dismissed from Chute Boxe Academy, his home training camp, for a "lack of commitment." Less than an hour later, it was reported that the fight had been cancelled due to Ferreira losing family and friends in the Brazilian floods, resulting in him being in "no condition to train or fight." David Branch replaced Ferriera. Palhares defeated Branch via second round submission (kneebar).

Palhares/Ferreira was expected to take place on August 27, 2011, at UFC 134. However, Ferreira was forced out of the bout with an injury and replaced by Dan Miller. Palhares would defeat Miller by unanimous decision, although there was some controversy when Palhares dropped Miller in the first round and after a few follow up punches, incorrectly thought the fight was over.

Palhares next faced Mike Massenzio on January 14, 2012, at UFC 142. He defeated Massenzio by heel hook in the first round, earning him his a $65,000 Submission of the Night bonus.

Palhares then faced Alan Belcher on May 5, 2012, at UFC on Fox 3. After getting the fight to the ground, Palhares was almost caught on a twister attempt by Belcher. Palhares was able to escape and proceeded to attempt various types of leglocks, which were all defended by Belcher. After some action, Palhares ended on his back, eventually succumbing to Belcher's ground and pound at 4:18 of the first round.

Palhares was expected to replace an injured Luiz Cane against Yushin Okami on August 11, 2012, at UFC 150. However Palhares himself was injured and forced out of the bout.

Palhares faced Héctor Lombard on December 15, 2012, at UFC on FX 6 where he lost via KO at 3:38 of Round 1. Following his loss to Lombard, the UFC announced that Palhares tested positive for elevated testosterone levels in his post-fight drug test and, subsequently, has been suspended for nine-months retroactive to December 14.

==== Drop to Welterweight and release from the UFC ====
Following his loss to Lombard, Palhares stated that he would be moving down one weight class to the welterweight division. He made his debut in the new division against Mike Pierce on October 9, 2013, at UFC Fight Night 29. He won the fight via heel hook submission just 31 seconds into the first round. This was the only successful submission throughout the event. However, Palhares was denied a Submission of the Night bonus because he continued cranking the heel hook after the referee stepped in, an act UFC deemed "unsportsmanlike conduct." It was also noted that Pierce tapped a total of eight times to no response from Palhares. The next day, while conducting an interview with ESPN's Jeremy Schaap, UFC president Dana White announced that the UFC was releasing Palhares effective immediately due to not letting go of the submission. Hours later, UFC and Zuffa released a statement saying that Palhares was already in trouble for his failure to release his heel hook on Drwal in 2010 and his drug suspension in 2012, and his actions the night before were the last straw.

=== World Series of Fighting ===
In November 2013, Palhares signed a contract with World Series of Fighting, but was already on thin ice as WSOF president Ray Sefo had given Palhares a very stern warning about in-cage conduct.

Palhares made his WSOF debut at WSOF 9 against the reigning Welterweight Champion Steve Carl. He won via inverted heel hook submission in the first round to win the WSOF Welterweight Championship.

In July, he was scheduled to fight Jon Fitch at WSOF 11. However, on April 30, 2014, the match was canceled. The fight with Jon Fitch was rescheduled for WSOF 16 on December 13, 2014. Palhares successfully defended his title, winning by kneebar only 90 seconds into first round. Again the length of the submission hold came into question.

Palhares faced Jake Shields on August 1, 2015, at WSOF 22. Shields did well against Palhares for the majority of the fight, but the tables began to turn in the 2nd round with a takedown by Palhares and the subsequent damage Palhares did on the ground. In the 3rd round, Palhares submitted Shields via kimura, but faced penalty from the NSAC soon after for once again holding on to a submission after being prompted to let it go by the referee, and for repeatedly eye-gouging Shields. Palhares came to the press one day after the incident and claimed innocence.

Following the incident, Palhares was stripped of his welterweight title and suspended indefinitely, with WSOF vice-president Ali Abdelaziz saying that Palhares "has mental problems and shouldn’t be allowed to fight until he fixes them."

=== Independent promotions ===
After the release from the WSOF, Palhares compiled a record of 1–4–1 in Italian, Polish and Russian promotions, losing two championship fights in the process.

On July 28, 2020, it was announced that Palhares had signed a contract with Taura MMA. Initially, he was expected to make his promotional debut against Sean Loeffler at Taura MMA 11 on October 30, 2020. However, on September 8, 2020, news surfaced that the bout was rescheduled to take place at Taura MMA 10 on October 23, 2020. Reports surfaced in the week leading up to this fight that Loeffler was forced to withdraw and was quickly replaced with Anthony Gordillo instead. In turn, Gordillo was not able to leave his hometown due to COVID-19 restrictions and the bout was cancelled.

Palhares faced Florent Betorangal on March 30, 2024 at Kongs Fighting Championship - Kongs FC 2, losing the bout lost by unanimous decision.

=== Absolute Championship Akhmat ===
Palhares faced Ibragim Magomedov at ACA 140 on June 17, 2022, losing the bout via first round TKO stoppage.

Palhares faced Anatoliy Boyko on December 16, 2022, at ACA 149, losing the bout after he got TKO'd in the first round.

==== Global Fight League ====
On December 11, 2024, it was announced that Palhares was signed by Global Fight League. However, in April 2025, it was reported that all GFL events were cancelled indefinitely.

== Professional grappling career ==
Palhares competed at BJJ Bet 2 on August 1, 2021 in a no gi grand prix. He lost in the opening round to William Tackett on points.

== Championships and accomplishments ==
- Ultimate Fighting Championship
  - Submission of the Night (Two times) vs. Ivan Salaverry and Mike Massenzio
  - Tied (Demian Maia, Thales Leites, Antônio Carlos Júnior, Rodolfo Vieira & Anthony Hernandez) for third most submission wins in UFC Middleweight division history (5)
  - Third highest submissions-per-15 minutes in UFC Middleweight division history (2.77)
  - Tied (Valter Walker) for most heel hook submissions in UFC history (4)
  - UFC.com Awards
    - 2010: Ranked #8 Submission of the Year vs. Tomasz Drwal
    - 2012: Ranked #10 Submission of the Yearvs. Mike Massenzio
- World Series of Fighting
  - WSOF Welterweight Championship (One time)
  - Two successful title defenses
- MMA Fighting
  - 2008 #10 Ranked UFC Submission of the Year vs. Ivan Salaverry at UFC 84

== Mixed martial arts record ==
Professional record breakdown
33 matches	19 wins	13 losses
By knockout	0	9
By submission	16	0
By decision	3	4
Draws	1	

Res.	Record	Opponent	Method	Event	Date	Round	Time	Location	Notes
Loss	19–13–1	Florent Betorangal	Decision (unanimous)	Kongs FC 2	March 30, 2024	3	5:00	Niort, France	Return to Middleweight.
Loss	19–12–1	Anatoliy Boyko	TKO (punches)	ACA 149: Vagaev vs Slipenko	December 16, 2022	1	3:52	Moscow, Russia	
Loss	19–11–1	Ibragim Magomedov	TKO (punches)	ACA 140: Ramos vs. Reznikov	June 17, 2022	1	2:09	Sochi, Russia	Middleweight bout.
Loss	19–10–1	Georgy Kichigin	TKO (punches)	Russian Cagefighting Championship 5	December 15, 2018	1	3:53	Ekaterinburg, Russia	
Loss	19–9–1	Aliaskhab Khizriev	KO (punches)	Fight Nights Global 85: Alikhanov vs. Kopylov	March 30, 2018	1	0:58	Moscow, Russia	For the Interim FNG Welterweight Championship; Palhares missed weight by 3 lbs and was not eligible to win the title
Draw	19–8–1	Shamil Amirov	Draw (overturned)	Fight Nights Global 73: Aliev vs. Brandão	September 5, 2017	3	5:00	Kaspiysk, Russia	Originally a split decision win for Amirov; overturned to draw by Russian MMA Union.
Win	19–8	Aleksei Ivanov	Submission (heel hook)	Fight Nights Global 70: Palhares vs. Ivanov	July 7, 2017	1	0:37	Ulan-Ude, Russia	
Loss	18–8	Michał Materla	KO (punch)	KSW 36: Materla vs. Palhares	October 1, 2016	2	1:27	Zielona Góra, Poland	Middleweight bout.
Loss	18–7	Emil Weber Meek	KO (punches and elbows)	Venator FC 3	May 21, 2016	1	0:45	Milan, Italy	For the Venator Welterweight Championship.
Win	18–6	Jake Shields	Submission (kimura)	WSOF 22	August 1, 2015	3	2:02	Las Vegas, Nevada, United States	Defended the WSOF Welterweight Championship. Later stripped of the title for not letting go of the submission when the referee stopped the fight.
Win	17–6	Jon Fitch	Submission (kneebar)	WSOF 16	December 13, 2014	1	1:30	Sacramento, California, United States	Defended the WSOF Welterweight Championship.
Win	16–6	Steve Carl	Submission (inverted heel hook)	WSOF 9	March 29, 2014	1	1:09	Las Vegas, Nevada, United States	Won the WSOF Welterweight Championship.
Win	15–6	Mike Pierce	Submission (heel hook)	UFC Fight Night: Maia vs. Shields	October 9, 2013	1	0:31	Barueri, Brazil	Welterweight debut. Subsequently released from the UFC for not letting go of the submission when the referee stopped the fight.
Loss	14–6	Héctor Lombard	KO (punches)	UFC on FX: Sotiropoulos vs. Pearson	December 15, 2012	1	3:38	Gold Coast, Australia	Suspended for 9 months due to elevated testosterone levels.
Loss	14–5	Alan Belcher	TKO (punches and elbows)	UFC on Fox: Diaz vs. Miller	May 5, 2012	1	4:18	East Rutherford, New Jersey, United States	
Win	14–4	Mike Massenzio	Submission (heel hook)	UFC 142	January 14, 2012	1	1:03	Rio de Janeiro, Brazil	Submission of the Night.
Win	13–4	Dan Miller	Decision (unanimous)	UFC 134	August 27, 2011	3	5:00	Rio de Janeiro, Brazil	
Win	12–4	David Branch	Submission (kneebar)	UFC Live: Sanchez vs. Kampmann	March 3, 2011	2	1:44	Louisville, Kentucky, United States	
Loss	11–4	Nate Marquardt	TKO (punches)	UFC Fight Night: Marquardt vs. Palhares	September 15, 2010	1	3:28	Austin, Texas, United States	
Win	11–3	Tomasz Drwal	Submission (heel hook)	UFC 111	March 27, 2010	1	0:45	Newark, New Jersey, United States	Suspended for 90 days for not letting go of the submission after initial stoppage.
Win	10–3	Lucio Linhares	Submission (heel hook)	UFC 107	December 12, 2009	2	3:21	Memphis, Tennessee, United States	
Win	9–3	Jeremy Horn	Decision (unanimous)	UFC 93	January 17, 2009	3	5:00	Dublin, Ireland	
Loss	8–3	Dan Henderson	Decision (unanimous)	UFC 88	September 6, 2008	3	5:00	Atlanta, Georgia, United States	
Win	8–2	Ivan Salaverry	Submission (armbar)	UFC 84	May 24, 2008	1	2:36	Paradise, Nevada, United States	Submission of the Night.
Win	7–2	Daniel Acacio	Submission (heel hook)	Fury FC 5: Final Conflict	December 6, 2007	1	1:22	São Paulo, Brazil	Won Fury FC Middleweight Grand Prix.
Win	6–2	Fabio Nascimento	Submission (heel hook)	Fury FC 5: Final Conflict	December 6, 2007	1	2:45	São Paulo, Brazil	Fury FC Middleweight Grand Prix Semifinal.
Win	5–2	Flavio Luiz Moura	Submission (ankle lock)	Fury FC 4: High Voltage	August 4, 2007	1	1:21	Teresopolis, Brazil	
Win	4–2	Helio Dipp	Submission (rear-naked choke)	Floripa Fight 3	March 10, 2007	1	1:40	Florianópolis, Brazil	
Win	3–2	Claudio Mattos	Submission (heel hook)	Storm Samurai 12	November 25, 2006	1	4:58	Curitiba, Brazil	
Loss	2–2	Arthur Cesar Jacintho	Decision (majority)	Rio MMA Challenger 2	June 21, 2006	3	5:00	Rio de Janeiro, Brazil	
Win	2–1	Renan Moraes	Submission (armbar)	Gold Fighters Championship 1	May 20, 2006	1	N/A	Rio de Janeiro, Brazil	
Win	1–1	Bruno Bastos	Decision (split)	Floripa Fight 2	April 29, 2006	3	5:00	Florianópolis, Brazil	
Loss	0–1	Leandro Silva	Decision (unanimous)	Banni Fight Combat 2	May 10, 2004	3	5:00	Brasília, Brazil	Middleweight debut.

== Grappling record ==
7 Matches, 3 Wins (3 Submissions), 4 Losses, 1 Draw
Result	Rec.	Opponent	Method	Event	Division	Date	Location
Loss	3–4–1	(United States) Gordon Ryan	Referee Decision	World Jiu-Jitsu Festival	Superfight	October 6, 2019	(United States) Long Beach, CA
Loss	3–3–1	(Australia) Craig Jones	Referee Decision	Kasai Pro 3	Superfight	August 18, 2018	(United States) New York City, NY
Draw	3–2–1	(United States) Garry Tonon	Draw	Polaris 3	Superfight	April 2, 2016	(United Kingdom) Poole
Loss	3–2	(Brazil) André Galvão	Points (4–9)	ADCC World championship	-88 kg	September 25, 2011	(United Kingdom) Nottingham
Win	3–1	(United States) Rafael Lovato Jr.	Submission (heel hook)	ADCC World championship	-88 kg	September 25, 2011	(United Kingdom) Nottingham
Win	2–1	(United States) David Avellan	Submission (heel hook)	ADCC World championship	-88 kg	September 24, 2011	(United Kingdom) Nottingham
Win	1–1	(Mexico) Dan Schon	Submission (heel hook)	ADCC World championship	-88 kg	September 24, 2011	(United Kingdom) Nottingham
Loss	0–1	(Brazil) Tarsis Humphreys	Points (4–9)	ADCC World championship	-88 kg	February 3, 2007	(Brazil) Rio de Janeiro

== See also ==
- List of current mixed martial arts champions
- List of male mixed martial artists
- List of Brazilian Jiu-Jitsu practitioners
