= UFC 118 =

UFC mixed martial arts event in 2010

UFC 118: Edgar vs. Penn 2
- The poster for UFC 118: Edgar vs. Penn 2
- Promotion: Ultimate Fighting Championship
- Date: August 28, 2010
- Venue: TD Garden
- City: Boston, Massachusetts
- Attendance: 14,168
- Total gate: $2,800,000
- Buyrate: 570,000

Event chronology
UFC 117: Silva vs. Sonnen	UFC 118: Edgar vs. Penn 2	UFC Fight Night: Marquardt vs. Palhares

UFC 118: Edgar vs. Penn 2 was a mixed martial arts event held by the Ultimate Fighting Championship on August 28, 2010, at the TD Garden in Boston, Massachusetts, United States. The third UFC Fan Expo coincided with the event. This event was the first the UFC held in Massachusetts.

== Background ==
Nate Marquardt and Alessio Sakara were originally set to face each other at UFC 116, but the fight was cancelled due to the death of Sakara's father. On July 23, Sakara's original opponent, Jorge Rivera suffered a broken arm in training and was replaced by Gerald Harris. On August 5, Sakara (who was back on the card) then bowed out due to an unknown injury and was replaced by Joe Vedepo. On August 18, it was announced that the Harris/Vedepo bout had been scrapped altogether.

A bout between Nate Marquardt and Rousimar Palhares was moved to UFC Fight Night 22 and promoted to the new main event. The original Fight Night main event was scheduled to be Demian Maia vs. Alan Belcher, however, Belcher had to withdraw due to an injured retina. As a result of this, Maia was moved to this card and fought Mario Miranda.

The event featured the first MMA appearance of a professional boxer with three-time world champion James Toney. The debut of a professional boxer took place at UFC 1 when Art Jimmerson lost to Royce Gracie by submission.

On August 5, it was announced that Terry Etim had suffered a broken rib in training and was pulling out of his bout with Joe Lauzon. Etim was replaced by former UFC and TUF veteran Gabe Ruediger.

Phil Baroni was scheduled to face John Salter, but Baroni was forced off the card on July 27 with a collarbone injury. Dan Miller served as Baroni's replacement.

On August 25, Dana White announced that the winner of the Florian vs. Maynard fight would be guaranteed the next shot at the lightweight title.

== Results ==
Main card
Weight class				Method	Round	Time	Notes
Lightweight	Frankie Edgar (c)	def	B.J. Penn	Decision (unanimous) (50–45, 50–45, 50–45)	5	5:00	(Note: For the UFC Lightweight Championship.)
Heavyweight	Randy Couture	def	James Toney	Submission (arm-triangle choke)	1	3:19
Middleweight	Demian Maia	def	Mario Miranda	Decision (unanimous) (30–27, 30–27, 30–27)	3	5:00
Lightweight	Gray Maynard	def	Kenny Florian	Decision (unanimous) (30–27, 30–27, 29–28)	3	5:00
Welterweight	Nate Diaz	def	Marcus Davis	Technical Submission (guillotine choke)	3	4:02
Televised prelims (Spike TV)
Lightweight	Joe Lauzon	def	Gabe Ruediger	Submission (armbar)	1	2:01
Lightweight	Nik Lentz	def	Andre Winner	Decision (unanimous) (30–27, 29–28, 30–27)	3	5:00
Preliminary card
Middleweight	Dan Miller	def	John Salter	Submission (guillotine choke)	2	1:53
Welterweight	Greg Soto	def	Nick Osipczak	Decision (unanimous) (29–28, 29–28, 29–28)	3	5:00
Welterweight	Mike Pierce	def	Amilcar Alves	Submission (cross-body armbar)	3	3:11

== Bonus awards ==
The following fighters received $60,000 bonuses.

- Fight of the Night: Nate Diaz vs. Marcus Davis
- Knockout of the Night: Not awarded as no matches ended by knockout.
- Submission of the Night: Joe Lauzon

== Reported payout ==
The following is the reported payout to the fighters as reported to the Massachusetts State Athletic Commission. It does not include sponsor money or "locker room" bonuses often given by the UFC and also do not include the UFC's traditional "fight night" bonuses.

- Frankie Edgar $96,000 (includes $48,000 win bonus) def. B.J. Penn $150,000
- Randy Couture $250,000 (no win bonus) def. James Toney $500,000
- Demian Maia $68,000 ($34,000 win bonus) def. Mario Miranda $8,000
- Gray Maynard $46,000 ($23,000 win bonus) def. Kenny Florian $65,000
- Nate Diaz $60,000 ($30,000 win bonus) def. Marcus Davis $31,000
- Joe Lauzon $24,000 ($12,000 win bonus) def. Gabe Ruediger $8,000
- Nik Lentz $22,000 ($11,000 win bonus) def. Andre Winner $10,000
- Dan Miller $30,000 ($15,000 win bonus) def. John Salter $8,000
- Greg Soto $12,000 ($6,000 win bonus) def. Nick Osipczak $10,000
- Mike Pierce $24,000 ($12,000 win bonus) def. Amilcar Alves $6,000

== See also ==
- Ultimate Fighting Championship
- List of UFC champions
- List of UFC events
- 2010 in UFC
