= List of International Fight League champions =

This is a list of the champions of the International Fight League.

== IFL Champions ==
=== Heavyweight Championship ===
Weight limit: Unlimited

No.	Name	Date	Location	Defenses
1	(United States) Roy Nelson def. Antoine Jaoude	December 29, 2007	Uncasville, Connecticut, United States	1. def. Fabiano Scherner on Feb 29, 2008 in Las Vegas, Nevada, United States; 2. def. Brad Imes on May 16, 2008 in Uncasville, Connecticut, United States

=== Light Heavyweight Championship ===
Weight limit: 210 lb (95.3 kg; 15.0 st)

No.	Name	Date	Location	Defenses
1	(Belarus) Vladimir Matyushenko def. Alex Schoenauer	November 3, 2007	Hoffman Estates, Illinois, United States	1. def. Jamal Patterson on Apr 04, 2008 in East Rutherford, New Jersey, United States

=== Middleweight Championship ===
Weight limit: 185 lb (83.9 kg; 13.2 st)

No.	Name	Date	Location	Defenses
1	(United States) Matt Horwich def. Benji Radach	December 29, 2007	Uncasville, Connecticut, United States	
2	(United States) Ryan McGivern	February 29, 2008	Las Vegas, Nevada, United States	
3	(United States) Dan Miller	May 16, 2008	Uncasville, Connecticut, United States	

=== Welterweight Championship ===
Weight limit: 170 lb (77.1 kg; 12.1 st)

No.	Name	Date	Location	Defenses
1	(United States) Jay Hieron def. Delson Heleno	December 29, 2007	Uncasville, Connecticut, United States	1. def. Mark Miller on Apr 04, 2008 in East Rutherford, New Jersey, United States

=== Lightweight Championship ===
Weight limit: 155 lb (70.3 kg; 11.1 st)

No.	Name	Date	Location	Defenses
1	(United States) Ryan Schultz def. Chris Horodecki	December 29, 2007	Uncasville, Connecticut, United States	1. def. John Gunderson on Feb 29, 2008 in Las Vegas, Nevada, United States; 2. def. Deividas Taurosevicius on May 16, 2008 in Uncasville, Connecticut, United States

=== Featherweight Championbship ===
Weight limit: 140 lb (63.5 kg; 10.0 st)

No.	Name	Date	Location	Defenses
1	(Brazil) Wagnney Fabiano def. LC Davis	December 29, 2007	Uncasville, Connecticut, United States	1. def. Shad Lierley on Apr 04, 2008 in East Rutherford, New Jersey, United States
