= UFC Fight Night: Maia vs. Shields =

UFC mixed martial arts event in 2013

- The poster for UFC Fight Night: Maia vs. Shields
- Promotion: Ultimate Fighting Championship
- Date: October 9, 2013
- Venue: Ginásio José Corrêa
- City: Barueri, Brazil
- Attendance: 6,621

Event chronology
UFC 165: Jones vs. Gustafsson	UFC Fight Night: Maia vs. Shields	UFC 166 Velasquez vs. dos Santos III

UFC Fight Night: Maia vs. Shields (also known as UFC Fight Night 29) was a mixed martial arts event held on October 9, 2013, at the Ginásio José Corrêa in Barueri, Brazil. The event was broadcast live on Fox Sports 1.

== Background ==
The event was headlined by a welterweight bout between Demian Maia and Jake Shields, with the main card broadcast on Fox Sports 1.

Rony Jason was expected to face Jeremy Stephens at this event. However, Jason and Stephens both pulled out due to injuries and the bout was rescheduled for UFC Fight Night 32.

Rodrigo Damm was expected to face Hacran Dias at the event. However, the bout was scrapped just days prior to the event after Damm was sidelined due to a kidney stone attack.

Thiago Silva came in 2 lb over the 206 lb weight limit and therefore Matt Hamill received 25% of Silva's purse. Their bout took place at a catchweight of 208 lb. Dana White stated Silva would be ineligible for any finishing bonuses, no matter the outcome of the fight, due to his missing weight.

Even though he was the only fighter to win by submission on the card, Rousimar Palhares was denied the Submission of the Night bonus after holding the submission after Mike Pierce had tapped, requiring the referee to physically release him. The following day, Dana White announced that Palhares would be released from his contract and banned from working at UFC ever again. He had done the same at UFC 111, earning a 90-day suspension, and was also suspended for nine months after testing positive for elevated testosterone following his loss to Héctor Lombard at UFC on FX: Sotiropoulos vs. Pearson.

== Results ==
Main card (Fox Sports 1)
Weight class				Method	Round	Time	Notes
Welterweight	Jake Shields	def.	Demian Maia	Decision (split) (48–47, 47–48, 48–47)	5	5:00
Welterweight	Dong Hyun Kim	def.	Erick Silva	KO (punch)	2	3:01
Catchweight (208 lb)	Thiago Silva	def.	Matt Hamill	Decision (unanimous) (30–27, 30–27, 29–27)	3	5:00
Light Heavyweight	Fabio Maldonado	def.	Joey Beltran	Decision (split) (28–29, 29–28, 29–28)	3	5:00
Welterweight	Rousimar Palhares	def.	Mike Pierce	Submission (heel hook)	1	0:31
Bantamweight	Raphael Assunção	def.	T.J. Dillashaw	Decision (split) (28–29, 29–28, 29–28)	3	5:00
Preliminary card (Fox Sports 1)
Welterweight	Igor Araújo	def.	Ildemar Alcantara	Decision (unanimous) (29–28, 29–28, 29–28)	3	5:00
Welterweight	Yan Cabral	def.	David Mitchell	Decision (unanimous) (30–27, 30–27, 30–27)	3	5:00
Flyweight	Chris Cariaso	def.	Iliarde Santos	TKO (punches)	2	4:31
Lightweight	Alan Patrick	def.	Garett Whiteley	TKO (punches)	1	3:54

== Bonus awards ==
The following fighters received $50,000 bonuses.

- Fight of The Night: Raphael Assunção vs. T.J. Dillashaw
- Knockout of The Night: Dong Hyun Kim
- Submission of the Night: None awarded

== See also ==
- List of UFC events
- 2013 in UFC
