= Mike Pierce =

American mixed martial arts fighter

- Born: Michael Pierce; September 1, 1980 (age 46); Portland, Oregon, United States
- Height: 5 ft 8 in (1.73 m)
- Weight: 170 lb (77 kg; 12 st)
- Division: Middleweight; Welterweight
- Reach: 71 in (180 cm)
- Fighting out of: Portland, Oregon, United States
- Team: Rose City FC
- Years active: 2007–2015

Mixed martial arts record
- Total: 24
- Wins: 17
- By knockout: 8
- By submission: 1
- By decision: 8
- Losses: 7
- By submission: 1
- By decision: 6

Other information
- Notable school: Sam Barlow High School
- Mixed martial arts record from Sherdog

Michael Pierce (born September 1, 1980) is a retired American professional mixed martial artist. He formerly competed as a Welterweight in the UFC and WEC.

== Background ==
Pierce was born and raised in Portland, Oregon, on September 1, 1980. Pierce competed in wrestling at Sam Barlow High School in Gresham, Oregon and then continued his career at Portland State University where he was a two-time All-American. Pierce is married and has two children and three stepchildren.

== Mixed martial arts career ==
=== Ultimate Fighting Championship ===
Pierce defeated former WEC contender Brock Larson via unanimous decision in his UFC debut at UFC Fight Night 19.

Pierce was expected to fight Josh Koscheck on January 11, 2010, at UFC Fight Night 20. However, Koscheck instead fought Anthony Johnson at UFC 106 and Pierce went on to face Jon Fitch on December 12, 2009, at UFC 107. After losing the first two rounds, Pierce dominated the end of the third round, nearly finishing Fitch. He lost to Fitch via unanimous decision (29-28, 29–28, 29–28).

Pierce was scheduled to face Rob Kimmons on March 21, 2010, at UFC Live: Vera vs. Jones, but Kimmons was forced off the card with an injury. Pierce instead faced UFC newcomer Julio Paulino. Pierce won the fight via unanimous decision (30-27, 30–27, 30–27).

Pierce again fought another UFC newcomer in Amilcar Alves on August 28, 2010, at UFC 118. He won the fight via submission (straight armbar) in the third round.

For the third consecutive time Pierce fought a UFC newcomer in Kenny Robertson on February 5, 2011, at UFC 126. He won the fight via TKO due to punches early into the second round.

Pierce faced Johny Hendricks on August 6, 2011, at UFC 133. Pierce lost the fight against Hendricks by split decision.

At UFC on Fox 1, on November 12, 2011, Pierce fought Paul Bradley in a rematch from their time on the regional circuit. He won the fight via split decision.

Pierce next faced Josh Koscheck on February 4, 2012, at UFC 143. He lost the fight via split decision.

Pierce defeated Carlos Eduardo Rocha on June 8, 2012, at UFC on FX 3 by unanimous decision. After a dominant performance by Pierce, initially 2 judges scored the fight 30-27 for Pierce, while the 3rd judge inexplicably scored it 30-27 for Rocha. However, it was later announced that the judge, Ric Bays, had scored the fight for the wrong corner and he had actually won unanimously.

Pierce fought Aaron Simpson on October 5, 2012, at UFC on FX 5. After a dominant first round put in by Simpson, nearly finishing Pierce on two occasions, Pierce came back, and 29 seconds into the second round, finished Simpson via one punch KO.

Pierce faced Seth Baczynski on December 15, 2012, at UFC on FX 6, replacing an injured Kyle Noke. He won the fight via unanimous decision.

Pierce fought David Mitchell on July 6, 2013, at UFC 162. After a close first round, Pierce won via TKO in the second round after landing a short left hook to the jaw and following up with ground and pound.

Pierce next faced Rousimar Palhares on October 9, 2013, at UFC Fight Night 29. He lost the fight via heel hook submission just 31 seconds into the first round. However, Palhares continued cranking the heel hook even after Pierce tapped out and the referee stepped in, leading the UFC to cut ties with Palhares the next day. Pierce suffered a sprained MCL and a torn ankle ligament.

Pierce was expected to face Demian Maia on May 31, 2014, at The Ultimate Fighter Brazil 3 Finale. However, Pierce had to pull out of the fight due to a broken hand.

After over two years away from the sport, Pierce returned from extended hiatus to face Ryan LaFlare on December 11, 2015, at The Ultimate Fighter 22 Finale. He lost the back-and-forth fight by unanimous decision.

On January 29, 2016, Pierce was released from the UFC.

== Championships and accomplishments ==
- Ultimate Fighting Championship
  - UFC.com Awards
    - 2009: Ranked #2 Upset of the Year vs. Brock Larson

== Mixed martial arts record ==
Professional record breakdown
24 matches	17 wins	7 losses
By knockout	8	0
By submission	1	1
By decision	8	6

Res.	Record	Opponent	Method	Event	Date	Round	Time	Location	Notes
Loss	17–7	Ryan LaFlare	Decision (unanimous)	The Ultimate Fighter: Team McGregor vs. Team Faber Finale	December 11, 2015	3	5:00	Las Vegas, Nevada, United States	
Loss	17–6	Rousimar Palhares	Submission (heel hook)	UFC Fight Night: Maia vs. Shields	October 9, 2013	1	0:31	Barueri, Brazil	
Win	17–5	David Mitchell	TKO (punches)	UFC 162	July 6, 2013	2	2:55	Las Vegas, Nevada, United States	
Win	16–5	Seth Baczynski	Decision (unanimous)	UFC on FX: Sotiropoulos vs. Pearson	December 15, 2012	3	5:00	Gold Coast, Australia	
Win	15–5	Aaron Simpson	KO (punch)	UFC on FX: Browne vs. Bigfoot	October 5, 2012	2	0:29	Minneapolis, Minnesota, United States	
Win	14–5	Carlos Eduardo Rocha	Decision (unanimous)	UFC on FX: Johnson vs. McCall	June 8, 2012	3	5:00	Sunrise, Florida, United States	
Loss	13–5	Josh Koscheck	Decision (split)	UFC 143	February 4, 2012	3	5:00	Las Vegas, Nevada, United States	
Win	13–4	Paul Bradley	Decision (split)	UFC on Fox: Velasquez vs. Dos Santos	November 12, 2011	3	5:00	Anaheim, California, United States	
Loss	12–4	Johny Hendricks	Decision (split)	UFC 133	August 6, 2011	3	5:00	Philadelphia, Pennsylvania, United States	
Win	12–3	Kenny Robertson	TKO (punches)	UFC 126	February 5, 2011	2	0:29	Las Vegas, Nevada, United States	
Win	11–3	Amilcar Alves	Submission (straight armbar)	UFC 118	August 28, 2010	3	3:11	Boston, Massachusetts, United States	
Win	10–3	Julio Paulino	Decision (unanimous)	UFC Live: Vera vs. Jones	March 21, 2010	3	5:00	Broomfield, Colorado, United States	
Loss	9–3	Jon Fitch	Decision (unanimous)	UFC 107	December 12, 2009	3	5:00	Memphis, Tennessee, United States	
Win	9–2	Brock Larson	Decision (unanimous)	UFC Fight Night: Diaz vs. Guillard	September 16, 2009	3	5:00	Oklahoma City, Oklahoma, United States	
Win	8–2	Paul Bradley	Decision (unanimous)	RIE 2: Brotherly Love Brawl	April 30, 2009	3	5:00	Oaks, Pennsylvania, United States	
Win	7–2	Justin Haskins	TKO (punches)	WEC 39	March 1, 2009	3	3:39	Corpus Christi, Texas, United States	
Win	6–2	Sean Huffman	TKO (punches)	Carnage at the Creek 4	November 22, 2008	2	4:40	Shelton, Washington, United States	
Win	5–2	Mark Miller	TKO (doctor stoppage)	SF 24: Domination	September 19, 2008	2	1:38	Portland, Oregon, United States	
Win	4–2	Jake Paul	Decision (unanimous)	EWC: Summer Slaughter	August 2, 2008	3	5:00	Salem, Oregon, United States	
Loss	3–2	Nathan Coy	Decision (unanimous)	SF 23: Heated Rivals	June 20, 2008	5	5:00	Portland, Oregon, United States	Lost the SF Welterweight Championship.
Win	3–1	Ed Nuno	Decision (unanimous)	SF 21: Seasons Beatings	December 22, 2007	3	5:00	Portland, Oregon, United States	Won the SF Welterweight Championship.
Win	2–1	Mike Dolce	KO (slam)	SF 20: Homecoming	October 27, 2007	1	0:05	Portland, Oregon, United States	Return to Welterweight.
Loss	1–1	Mark Muñoz	Decision (unanimous)	GC 69: Bad Intentions	September 22, 2007	3	5:00	Sacramento, California, United States	Middleweight debut.
Win	1–0	Nick Gilardi	TKO (doctor stoppage)	Elite Warriors Championship	June 2, 2007	2	4:54	Portland, Oregon, United States	

== See also ==
- List of current UFC fighters
- List of male mixed martial artists
