= Tomasz Drwal =

Polish mixed martial arts fighter

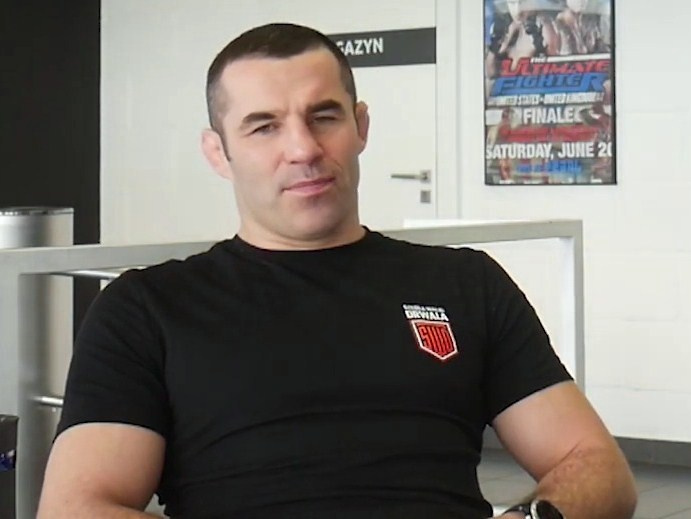
- Born: January 22, 1982 (age 44); Nowy Sącz, Poland
- Other names: Gorilla
- Height: 6 ft 1 in (1.85 m)
- Weight: 185 lb (84 kg; 13.2 st)
- Division: Middleweight; Light Heavyweight
- Reach: 76.0 in (193 cm)
- Stance: Orthodox
- Fighting out of: Kraków, Poland
- Team: Alliance MMA/Szkoła Walki Drwala
- Years active: 2004–present

Mixed martial arts record
- Total: 29
- Wins: 22
- By knockout: 13
- By submission: 6
- By decision: 3
- Losses: 6
- By knockout: 3
- By submission: 2
- By decision: 1
- Draws: 1

Other information
- Mixed martial arts record from Sherdog

Tomasz Witold Drwal (Polish: [ˈtɔmaʐ ˈdrval]; born January 22, 1982) is a Polish professional mixed martial artist and boxer who most recently competed in the Middleweight division of KSW. A professional competitor since 2004, Drwal has also competed for the UFC.

== Mixed martial arts career ==
=== Ultimate Fighting Championship ===
Drwal lost his UFC debut against Thiago Silva at UFC 75 on September 8, 2007.

Drwal returned to action after knee surgery at UFC 93 in January 2009 and defeated the debuting Ivan Serati via KO in the first round.

Drwal next fight was a first-round TKO over Mike Ciesnolevicz on the TUF 9 Finale on June 20, 2009 (a replacement for injured Eric Schafer).

Moving down to Middleweight, Drwal defeated Drew McFedries at UFC 103 in the second round by rear-naked choke submission.

Drwal faced Rousimar Palhares on March 27, 2010 at UFC 111, losing after an early slip via heel hook submission which appeared to injure Drwal. Palhares was subsequently suspended for 90 days for continuing to apply pressure to the lock after the referee intervened.

Drwal then fought David Branch on September 15, 2010 at UFC Fight Night 22. Drwal was initially set to fight Nick Catone who had to withdraw from the fight due to injury. He lost the fight via unanimous decision. Following two subsequent losses, Drwal was released from his UFC contract.

=== Post-UFC ===
Drwal returned to his winning ways knocking out Leonardo Lucio Nascimento at FAŁ 2 in his native Poland. His next fights were for new Polish promotion called MMA Attack, in which to this point he had two fights, against Gary Padilla and Wes Swofford, and all of them he won, respectively by unanimous decision and submission via armbar in 1st round.

Tomasz faced Łukasz Bieńkowski at KSW 53: Reborn. He won the fight via second round TKO.

Drwal faced Patrik Kincl on December 19, 2020 at KSW 57: De Fries vs. Kita. He lost the fight after getting knocked unconscious at the end of round 1.

== Professional boxing ==
Drwal made his professional boxing debut on November 4, 2017 against Brazilian MMA fighter Luiz Abdalla in a 194 lbs bout. Drwal won via knockout.

== Championships and accomplishments ==
- Ultimate Fighting Championship
  - Knockout of the Night (One time) vs. Mike Ciesnolevicz

== Mixed martial arts record ==
Professional record breakdown
29 matches	22 wins	6 losses
By knockout	13	3
By submission	6	2
By decision	3	1
Draws	1	

Res.	Record	Opponent	Method	Event	Date	Round	Time	Location	Notes
Loss	22–6–1	Patrik Kincl	KO (punch)	KSW 57: De Fries vs. Kita	December 19, 2020	1	4:22	Łódź, Poland	
Win	22–5–1	Łukasz Bieńkowski	TKO (punches)	KSW 53: Reborn	July 11, 2020	2	2:34	Warsaw, Poland	
Loss	21–5–1	Michał Materla	TKO (punches)	KSW 31: Materla vs. Drwal	May 23, 2015	3	4:56	Gdańsk, Poland	For the KSW Middleweight Championship.
Win	21–4–1	Delson Heleno	KO (punch)	Pro MMA Challenge 1: Drwal vs. Heleno	March 1, 2014	1	4:03	Wrocław, Poland	
Win	20–4–1	Wes Swofford	Submission (armbar)	MMA Attack 3	April 27, 2013	1	3:00	Katowice, Poland	
Win	19–4–1	Gary Padilla	Decision (unanimous)	MMA Attack	November 5, 2011	2	5:00	Warsaw, Poland	
Win	18–4–1	Leonardo Lucio Nascimento	KO (punches)	Fighters Arena Łódź 2	March 26, 2011	2	3:37	Łódź, Poland	Catchweight (200 lbs) bout.
Loss	17–4–1	David Branch	Decision (unanimous)	UFC Fight Night: Marquardt vs. Palhares	September 15, 2010	3	5:00	Austin, United States	
Loss	17–3–1	Rousimar Palhares	Submission (heel hook)	UFC 111	March 27, 2010	1	0:45	Newark, United States	
Win	17–2–1	Drew McFedries	Submission (rear-naked choke)	UFC 103	September 19, 2009	2	1:03	Dallas, United States	Middleweight debut.
Win	16–2–1	Mike Ciesnolevicz	TKO (knee and punches)	The Ultimate Fighter 9 Finale	June 20, 2009	1	4:48	Las Vegas, United States	Catchweight (208 lbs) bout; Ciesnolevicz missed weight. Knockout of the Night.
Win	15–2–1	Ivan Serati	KO (punches)	UFC 93	January 17, 2009	1	2:02	Dublin, Ireland	
Loss	14–2–1	Thiago Silva	TKO (punches)	UFC 75	September 8, 2007	2	4:23	London, England	
Win	14–1–1	Andre Fyeet	Submission (rear-naked choke)	Fight Club Berlin 9	April 22, 2007	1	3:22	Berlin, Germany	
Win	13–1–1	Valdas Pocevicius	TKO (punches)	World Full Contact Association: Grand Prix 2007	January 27, 2007	1	N/A	Riga, Latvia	
Win	12–1–1	Lucio Linhares	TKO (punches)	The Cage: Volume 4	December 3, 2005	1	3:32	Helsinki, Finland	
Win	11–1–1	Pavel Nohynek	KO	Fight Club Berlin 6	November 25, 2005	1	2:03	Berlin, Germany	
Win	10–1–1	Nordin Asrih	KO	Budo Freefight System: Mix Fight Gala 5	October 2, 2005	1	N/A	Düsseldorf, Germany	
Win	9–1–1	Denis Juskevic	KO	Outsider Cup: Freefight Romania	June 11, 2005	1	N/A	Romania	
Win	8–1–1	Martin Kubes	TKO	Fight Club Berlin 5	April 24, 2005	N/A	N/A	Berlin, Germany	
Win	7–1–1	Przemysław Tomczyk	Submission (triangle armbar)	MMA Sport 1	March 18, 2005	1	1:24	Warsaw, Poland	
Win	6–1–1	Michael Knaap	Submission (choke)	Budo Freefight System: Mix Fight Gala 4	March 6, 2005	2	N/A	Düsseldorf, Germany	
Win	5–1–1	Ulf Fritzmann	Submission (strikes)	Fight Club Berlin 4	November 14, 2004	1	N/A	Berlin, Germany	
Win	4–1–1	Jacek Buczko	Decision	Colosseum 3	September 19, 2004	2	5:00	Bielsko-Biała, Poland	
Win	3–1–1	Krzysztof Gołaszewski	Decision	Colosseum 3	September 19, 2004	2	5:00	Bielsko-Biała, Poland	
Win	2–1–1	Sławomir Zakrzewski	TKO (punches)	Colosseum 3	September 19, 2004	1	1:36	Bielsko-Biała, Poland	
Loss	1–1–1	Ulf Fritzmann	Submission	Fight Club Berlin 3	March 28, 2004	1	N/A	Berlin, Germany	
Win	1–0–1	Daniel Les	TKO (punches)	Colosseum 1	March 21, 2004	1	2:15	Bielsko-Biała, Poland	
Draw	0–0–1	Piotr Baginski	Draw	Berserkers Arena 2	January 11, 2004	1	30:00	Szczecin, Poland	

== See also ==
- List of current KSW fighters
- List of male mixed martial artists
