= Dan Miller (fighter) =

American mixed martial arts fighter

- Born: Daniel James Miller; June 30, 1981 (age 45); Sparta Township, New Jersey, U.S.
- Nationality: American
- Height: 6 ft 1 in (1.85 m)
- Weight: 185 lb (84 kg; 13.2 st)
- Division: Welterweight; Middleweight
- Reach: 75 in (190 cm)
- Fighting out of: Sparta Township, New Jersey, U.S.
- Team: Miller Brothers MMA
- Rank: Black belt in Brazilian Jiu-Jitsu under Jamie Cruz
- Years active: 2005-2013, 2015

Mixed martial arts record
- Total: 23
- Wins: 14
- By knockout: 1
- By submission: 9
- By decision: 4
- Losses: 8
- By knockout: 1
- By decision: 7
- No contests: 1

Other information
- Notable relatives: Jim Miller (brother)
- Notable school: Sparta High School
- Website: http://www.millerbrothersmma.com/
- Mixed martial arts record from Sherdog

Daniel James Miller (born June 30, 1981) is an American former mixed martial artist. A professional from 2005 until 2014, he is perhaps best known for competing in the UFC, but was also the final International Fight League Middleweight Champion, representing the New York Pitbulls. He is the older brother of current UFC Lightweight Jim Miller.

== Background ==
Born and raised in Sparta Township, New Jersey, along with two brothers, Miller began wrestling from a young age and continued competing at Sparta High School. Miller then began his mixed martial arts career in 2005, when he began training at Planet Jiu-Jitsu. On January 15, 2010, Miller received his Brazilian jiu-jitsu black belt under Jamie Cruz.

== Mixed martial arts career ==
=== Early career ===
Miller had his first professional fight November 19, 2005, against Tenyeh Dixon at Reality Fighting 10 and was victorious by triangle choke in the first round. Miller followed the Dixon fight with a victory over Jay Coleman at Reality Fighting 11 by Armbar, setting up a #1 contender match against Mike Massenzio. As the main event at Reality Fighting 12, Massenzio and Miller fought to a close decision, with Miller's submission attempts earning the victory on one judge's card and Massenzio's strong takedowns earning the victory on two cards, and the fight.

Miller's next fight came at the Cage Fury Fighting Championships where he took on Dave Perez. Miller landed a strong upkick from his back early before controlling the rest of the fight. Perez failed to answer the bell for round 2, and Miller's victory earned him a title shot at CFFC II. Miller fought Lance Everson at CFFC II for the Cage Fury Fighting Championships Middleweight Title. The fight was highlighted by a powerful slam by Miller which led to a rear-naked choke which earned Miller the first round victory and the title.

Following CFFC II, Planet Jiu Jitsu closed down. Miller began training at American Martial Arts in Whippany, New Jersey, with his brother Jim in January, 2007.

Miller defended his title April 13, 2007, against Rhino Fight Team's Jose Rodriguez in his first fight with AMA Fight Club. Miller's brother Jim also fought on the card; the first time the brothers had fought together since Reality Fighting 12 and both were victorious. Using his strong wrestling and Jiu Jitsu skills, Miller took Rodriguez to the ground on multiple occasions, and dealt damage from on top. Though Miller attained the mount twice, and had an attempted Armbar in the third round, Rodriguez proved to be tough and the fight went to the judges where Miller was granted the unanimous 30–27 victory.

Miller made his IFL debut when he fought for Renzo Gracie's New York Pitbulls in the 2007 IFL Semifinals in East Rutherford, New Jersey, filling in for the injured Fabio Leopaldo. Miller fought the Tokyo Sabres' Dave Phillips in the first fight between the teams. After a quick slam by Miller, Phillips established guard and attempted an armbar. Miller slammed out, and in the scramble secured Phillips' neck in a standing guillotine choke. IFL Commentator Bas Rutten called the choke, which rendered Phillips unconscious, "the tightest guillotine [he'd] ever seen," and Miller earned the Submission-of-the-Night award for it.

Miller defeated Ryan McGivern by kneebar to become the last IFL Middleweight Championship.

=== Ultimate Fighting Championship ===
On July 23, 2008, it was announced that the UFC had signed both Miller and his brother Jim each to four fight contracts. Miller was successful in his UFC debut against Rob Kimmons at UFC Fight Night: Diaz vs. Neer, winning via rear-naked choke submission.

Miller returned to the Octagon and defeated Matt Horwich via unanimous decision at UFC 90 on October 25, 2008. He moved his UFC record to 3–0 with a first round submission victory over Jake Rosholt at UFC Fight Night: Lauzon vs. Stephens on February 7, 2009.

Originally, Miller was scheduled to fight again at UFC 98 against Yushin Okami, but Okami sustained an injury and was replaced by Chael Sonnen. He lost via unanimous decision as Sonnen took him down at will and ground and pounded for three rounds en route to a victory.

Miller was scheduled to fight CB Dollaway on September 16, 2009, at UFC Fight Night 19, but got an infection and had to withdraw.

Miller lost a unanimous decision to Demian Maia on February 6, 2010, at UFC 109.

Miller next lost his third consecutive UFC fight to Michael Bisping via unanimous decision on May 29, 2010, at UFC 114.

Miller faced John Salter on August 28, 2010, at UFC 118, replacing an injured Phil Baroni. Miller earned a much needed win via submission due to a Ninja Choke (a front Rear Naked Choke) at 1:53 of the second round. It was Miller's first victory since February 2009.

Miller next defeated Joe Doerksen on December 11, 2010, at UFC 124 via split decision.

Miller faced Nate Marquardt on March 19, 2011, at UFC 128, replacing Yoshihiro Akiyama on one week's notice. He lost the fight via unanimous decision.

Miller faced Rousimar Palhares on August 27, 2011, at UFC 134, replacing an injured Alexandre Ferreira. In the first round, Dan was dropped by strikes, Palhares followed up with ground and pound; using effective blocking and intelligent defense, Miller was able to protect himself from the strikes but Palhares stopped his ground and pound to begin celebrating and climbed on top of the cage ring. Ref Herb Dean pulled Palhares back into the ring and advised that he did not stop the fight. Before continuing, both fighters reset and met in the middle of the ring; Dan Miller immediately dropped Palhares with a hard punch. Palhares even went limp as he fell to the canvas, but quickly regained composure. Palhares ended up defeating Miller by unanimous decision.

Miller faced Ricardo Funch in a Welterweight bout on June 22, 2012, at UFC on FX 4. Miller was successful his welterweight debut, submitting Funch with a guillotine choke late in round 3, earning Submission of the Night honors.

Miller was expected to face Sean Pierson on September 22, 2012, at UFC 152. However, Miller pulled out of the bout after getting news about his son's kidney transplant operation and was replaced by Lance Benoist.

Miller returned to the UFC octagon on March 16, 2013, at UFC 158, where he faced Jordan Mein on the card. He lost the fight via TKO in the first round, the first stoppage loss of his career.

Miller was expected to return to middleweight and face Daniel Sarafian on December 20, 2014, at UFC Fight Night 58. However, Miller pulled out of the bout on December 11 and was replaced by promotional newcomer Antonio dos Santos Jr.

After over two years away from the sport, Miller returned to face Trevor Smith on July 12, 2015, at The Ultimate Fighter 21 Finale. He lost the fight via unanimous decision and was subsequently released from the promotion.

== Personal life ==
Miller is married. The couple lost their first child, a daughter in March 2009. Their second child has struggled with health problems. Prior to their careers in mixed martial arts, Dan and his younger brother Jim worked in construction with their father.

== Championships and accomplishments ==
- Ultimate Fighting Championship
  - Submission of the Night (One time) vs. Ricardo Funch
  - UFC.com Awards
    - 2008: Ranked #7 Newcomer of the Year (Tied with Jim Miller)
- Cage Fury Fighting Championships
  - CFFC Middleweight Championship (One time)
  - One successful title defense
- International Fight League
  - IFL Middleweight Championship (One time)

== Mixed martial arts record ==
Professional record breakdown
23 matches	14 wins	8 losses
By knockout	1	1
By submission	9	0
By decision	4	7
No contests	1	

Res.	Record	Opponent	Method	Event	Date	Round	Time	Location	Notes
Loss	14–8 (1)	Trevor Smith	Decision (unanimous)	The Ultimate Fighter: American Top Team vs. Blackzilians Finale	July 12, 2015	3	5:00	Las Vegas, Nevada, United States	Return to Middleweight.
Loss	14–7 (1)	Jordan Mein	TKO (punches)	UFC 158	March 16, 2013	1	4:42	Montreal, Quebec, Canada	
Win	14–6 (1)	Ricardo Funch	Submission (guillotine choke)	UFC on FX: Maynard vs. Guida	June 22, 2012	3	3:12	Atlantic City, New Jersey, United States	Welterweight debut. Submission of the Night.
Loss	13–6 (1)	Rousimar Palhares	Decision (unanimous)	UFC 134	August 27, 2011	3	5:00	Rio de Janeiro, Brazil	
Loss	13–5 (1)	Nate Marquardt	Decision (unanimous)	UFC 128	March 19, 2011	3	5:00	Newark, New Jersey, United States	
Win	13–4 (1)	Joe Doerksen	Decision (split)	UFC 124	December 11, 2010	3	5:00	Montreal, Quebec, Canada	
Win	12–4 (1)	John Salter	Submission (guillotine choke)	UFC 118	August 28, 2010	2	1:53	Boston, Massachusetts, United States	
Loss	11–4 (1)	Michael Bisping	Decision (unanimous)	UFC 114	May 29, 2010	3	5:00	Las Vegas, Nevada, United States	
Loss	11–3 (1)	Demian Maia	Decision (unanimous)	UFC 109	February 6, 2010	3	5:00	Las Vegas, Nevada, United States	
Loss	11–2 (1)	Chael Sonnen	Decision (unanimous)	UFC 98	May 23, 2009	3	5:00	Las Vegas, Nevada, United States	
Win	11–1 (1)	Jake Rosholt	Submission (guillotine choke)	UFC Fight Night: Lauzon vs. Stephens	February 7, 2009	1	1:03	Tampa, Florida, United States	
Win	10–1 (1)	Matt Horwich	Decision (unanimous)	UFC 90	October 25, 2008	3	5:00	Rosemont, Illinois, United States	
Win	9–1 (1)	Rob Kimmons	Submission (rear-naked choke)	UFC Fight Night: Diaz vs. Neer	September 17, 2008	1	1:27	Omaha, Nebraska, United States	
Win	8–1 (1)	Ryan McGivern	Submission (kneebar)	IFL: Connecticut	May 16, 2008	1	3:36	Uncasville, Connecticut, United States	Won the IFL Middleweight Championship.
NC	7–1 (1)	Mike Geurin	No Contest (headbutt)	Ring of Combat 18	March 7, 2008	1	0:34	Atlantic City, New Jersey, United States	Miller injured by an accidental headbutt.
Win	7–1	John Howard	Decision (unanimous)	Ring of Combat 17: Beast of the Northeast Finals	November 30, 2007	3	5:00	Atlantic City, New Jersey, United States	
Win	6–1	Dave Phillips	Submission (standing guillotine choke)	IFL: 2007 Semifinals	August 2, 2007	1	1:30	East Rutherford, New Jersey, United States	
Win	5–1	Jose Rodriguez	Decision (unanimous)	Cage Fury Fighting Championships 4	April 13, 2007	3	5:00	Atlantic City, New Jersey, United States	Defended the Cage Fury Middleweight Championship.
Win	4–1	Lance Everson	Submission (rear-naked choke)	Cage Fury Fighting Championships 2	October 6, 2006	1	2:26	Atlantic City, New Jersey, United States	Won the Cage Fury Middleweight Championship.
Win	3–1	Dave Perez	TKO (corner stoppage)	Cage Fury Fighting Championships 1	June 30, 2006	1	5:00	Atlantic City, New Jersey, United States	
Loss	2–1	Mike Massenzio	Decision (split)	Reality Fighting 12: Return to Boardwalk Hall	April 29, 2006	3	5:00	Atlantic City, New Jersey, United States	
Win	2–0	Jay Coleman	Submission (armbar)	Reality Fighting 11: Battle at Taj Mahal	February 11, 2006	1	N/A	Atlantic City, New Jersey, United States	
Win	1–0	Tenyeh Dixon	Submission (triangle choke)	Reality Fighting 10	November 19, 2005	1	2:20	Atlantic City, New Jersey, United States	

== See also ==
- List of current UFC fighters
- List of male mixed martial artists

Preceded by Ryan McGivern	3rd IFL Middleweight Champion; May 16, 2008 – July 31, 2008	Succeeded by IFL ceased operations
