= UFC 109 =

UFC mixed martial arts event in 2010

UFC 109: Relentless
- The poster for UFC 109: Relentless
- Promotion: Ultimate Fighting Championship
- Date: February 6, 2010
- Venue: Mandalay Bay Events Center
- City: Las Vegas, Nevada
- Attendance: 10,753
- Total gate: $2,273,000
- Buyrate: 275,000

Event chronology
UFC Fight Night: Maynard vs. Diaz	UFC 109: Relentless	UFC 110: Nogueira vs. Velasquez

UFC 109: Relentless was a mixed martial arts event held by the Ultimate Fighting Championship (UFC) on February 6, 2010, at the Mandalay Bay Events Center in Las Vegas, Nevada.

== Background ==
A previously rumoured bout between Renzo Gracie and Matt Hughes did not take place on this card, but took place at UFC 112.

A Middleweight Championship bout between Anderson Silva and Vitor Belfort was confirmed by UFC President Dana White, although it was contingent on Silva's successful recovery from elbow surgery. Subsequently, the fight was rescheduled due to Silva's continued slow healing from surgery. The Silva vs. Belfort bout was expected to take place at UFC 112, however Belfort was forced to withdraw from the fight and Demian Maia replaced him, after number one contender Chael Sonnen was not clear to fight.

Antônio Rogério Nogueira had to withdraw from his bout against Brandon Vera due to an ankle injury. It was announced that Vera will face future Light Heavyweight Champion Jon Jones on March 21, 2010, at UFC Live: Vera vs. Jones.

Josh Koscheck was scheduled to face Paulo Thiago, but was forced off the card with an injury. Mike Swick stepped in as Koscheck's replacement and fought Thiago.

The bout between Randy Couture and Mark Coleman was originally scheduled for UFC 17 in 1998, but a Couture injury forced the cancellation of the bout. Nearly twelve years later, this bout headlined UFC 109. It marked the first time in UFC history that two Hall of Fame inductees fought in an event.

Mostapha Al-turk ran into visa issues that prevented him from making the trip to Las Vegas his fight against Rolles Gracie. Both Jon Madsen and Joey Beltran were pegged as possible late replacements to step in and fight Rolles Gracie, before Beltran got the nod as the replacement fighter against Gracie.

Dana White also announced that the winner of the Nate Marquardt and Chael Sonnen fight would receive a title shot against the winner of the Silva/Maia fight at UFC 112.

== Results ==
Main card
Weight class				Method	Round	Time	Notes
Light Heavyweight	Randy Couture	def.	Mark Coleman	Submission (rear-naked choke)	2	1:09
Middleweight	Chael Sonnen	def.	Nate Marquardt	Decision (unanimous) (30–27, 30–27, 30–27)	3	5:00
Welterweight	Paulo Thiago	def.	Mike Swick	Technical Submission (D'Arce choke)	2	1:54
Middleweight	Demian Maia	def.	Dan Miller	Decision (unanimous) (30–27, 29–28, 29–28)	3	5:00
Welterweight	Matt Serra	def.	Frank Trigg	TKO (punches)	1	2:23
Televised (Spike TV)
Lightweight	Mac Danzig	def.	Justin Buchholz	Decision (unanimous) (29–28, 29–28, 29–28)	3	5:00
Lightweight	Melvin Guillard	def.	Ronys Torres	Decision (unanimous) (29–28, 29–28, 29–28)	3	5:00
Lightweight	Rob Emerson	def.	Phillipe Nover	Decision (unanimous) (29–28, 29–28, 29–28)	3	5:00
Light Heavyweight	Phil Davis	def.	Brian Stann	Decision (unanimous) (30–27, 30–26, 30–26)	3	5:00
Preliminary card
Heavyweight	Chris Tuchscherer	def.	Tim Hague	Decision (majority) (29–28, 29–28, 28–28)	3	5:00
Heavyweight	Joey Beltran	def.	Rolles Gracie Jr.	TKO (punches)	2	1:31

== Bonus awards ==
The following fighters received $60,000 bonuses.

- Fight of the Night: Nate Marquardt vs. Chael Sonnen
- Knockout of the Night: Matt Serra
- Submission of the Night: Paulo Thiago

== Reported payout ==
The following is the reported payout to the fighters as reported to the Nevada State Athletic Commission. It does not include sponsor money or "locker room" bonuses often given by the UFC and also do not include the UFC's traditional "fight night" bonuses.

- Randy Couture: $250,000 (no win bonus) def. Mark Coleman: $60,000
- Chael Sonnen: $64,000 (includes $32,000 win bonus) def. Nate Marquardt: $45,000
- Paulo Thiago: $30,000 ($15,000 win bonus) def. Mike Swick: $43,000
- Demian Maia: $62,000 ($31,000 win bonus) def. Dan Miller: $15,000
- Matt Serra: $150,000 ($75,000 win bonus) def. Frank Trigg: $30,000
- Mac Danzig: $40,000 ($20,000 win bonus) def. Justin Buchholz: $8,000
- Melvin Guillard: $28,000 ($14,000 win bonus) def. Ronys Torres: $4,000
- Rob Emerson: $24,000 ($12,000 win bonus) def. Phillipe Nover: $10,000
- Phil Davis: $10,000 ($5,000 win bonus) def. Brian Stann: $17,000
- Chris Tuchscherer: $20,000 ($10,000 win bonus) def. Tim Hague: $7,000
- Joey Beltran: $12,000 ($6,000 win bonus) def. Rolles Gracie: $15,000

== Television rating ==
The preliminary bouts shown on Spike TV at 9 pm EST drew a series-high of 1.7 million viewers.

== See also ==
- Ultimate Fighting Championship
- List of UFC champions
- List of UFC events
- 2010 in UFC
