= Matt Horwich =

American mixed martial arts fighter

- Born: Matthew Peter Horwich; February 10, 1978 (age 48); Pasadena, California, United States
- Other names: Suave
- Nationality: American
- Height: 5 ft 11 in (1.80 m)
- Weight: 185.6 lb (84.2 kg; 13.26 st)
- Division: Middleweight; Light Heavyweight
- Reach: 75 in (190 cm)
- Fighting out of: Hollywood, California, United States
- Team: Kings MMA; 10th Planet Jiu Jitsu
- Rank: Brown belt in 10th Planet Jiu-Jitsu; Purple belt in Brazilian Jiu-Jitsu
- Years active: 2003–present

Mixed martial arts record
- Total: 56
- Wins: 30
- By knockout: 6
- By submission: 21
- By decision: 3
- Losses: 25
- By knockout: 2
- By submission: 4
- By decision: 19
- Draws: 1

Other information
- Mixed martial arts record from Sherdog

Matthew Peter Horwich (born October 2, 1978) is an American mixed martial artist who most recently competed in the Middleweight division. A professional competitor since 2003, Horwich has fought in BAMMA, Strikeforce, Bellator, the UFC, and for the Seattle Tiger Sharks of the IFL where he became the IFL Middleweight Champion in 2007.

== Background ==
Horwich was born and raised in Seattle, Washington. He watched many Bruce Lee films growing up and entered Dojo Kai Korean traditional martial arts classes. Growing up, Horwich had little interest in school due to low opinions of his teachers. Unmotivated, lost, and without a concrete path to embark on, he began to experiment with drugs and alcohol. He then garnered interest for Brazilian Jiu-Jitsu (BJJ) at the age of 17 and saved up enough money to become a mentee of Royce Gracie. Sometime after his mentorship, Horwich was jailed for thirty days for fighting and breaking windows. After his release, he relocated to Seattle, Washington with the intention of starting a band. While there, he performed odd jobs and lived in squatter homes as he tried to decide between becoming either a musician or a martial artist. During his time in Seattle, Horwich experienced a religious conversion as a self-described "spiritual" Christian and rededicated himself to building a career in martial arts.

== Mixed martial arts career ==
=== Early career ===
Horwich developed his skills as a submission specialist training with Team Quest as well as BJJ black belts B.J. Penn and Eddie Bravo. He has also trained extensively with accomplished Kickboxer and Muay Thai Fighter Chris Reilly.

Before signing with the International Fight League's Portland Wolfpack, Matt Horwich earned a record of 15-6-1 fighting in small promotions. After joining the IFL, he faced Benji Radach in the IFL's World Grand Prix Finals to determine the first middleweight champion. Horwich defeated the Radach by knockout in the second round, becoming the IFL's first ever middleweight champion.`

Matt Horwich later signed with the UFC after the IFL shut down and made his debut at UFC 90. facing fellow former IFL middleweight champion Dan Miller. Despite a near second round finish for Horwich late in the second round, Miller controlled most of the first and third rounds and earned a unanimous decision. Horwich made his second UFC appearance at UFC Fight Night: Condit vs. Kampmann against Ricardo Almeida which resulted in a second decision loss and his release from the company.

After his release, Horwich debuted with Bellator and Aggression MMA where he earned split-decision victory over Jason Lambert in his Aggression debut. This rematch took place in Alberta, Canada.

Horwich fought Tom 'Kong' Watson at BAMMA3 as a late replacement for Alex Reid on May 15, 2010, and lost. It was his first fight in Britain.

Horwich beat Thales Leites, former UFC Middleweight contender, in an upset victory on August 14.

On September 9, 2010, Horwich fought Bellator season two semifinalist Eric Schambari, losing via split decision.

Horwich defeated Jake Rosholt by technical knockout in the third round at Xtreme Fight Night – Rosholt vs. Horwich in November 2010.

At Shark Fights 14: Horwich vs. Villefort on March 11, 2011, Horwich faced UFC and WEC veteran Danillo Villefort, losing by unanimous decision after being controlled both on the feet and the floor for the majority of the fight.

Horwich faced a rematch with Jake Rosholt at Shark Fights 17: Horwich vs. Rosholt 2 on July 15, 2011, losing by unanimous decision.

Horwich fought Piotr Strus at KSW 25 on December 7, 2013. Though the fan favorite coming into the fight, Horwich lost by majority decision.

== Personal life ==
Matt Horwich was married the day after his first attempted defense of the IFL Middleweight Championship. Horwich is often described as a hippie who frequently quotes Bible passages and personal aphorisms in conversation. His hobbies include playing guitar and writing music and poetry, mostly themed around his interest in quantum mechanics.

In September 2022, Matt was featured in underground mini-comic issue #12 "MULTIVERSE" by Spencer Wile.

== Mixed martial arts record ==
Professional record breakdown
56 matches	30 wins	25 losses
By knockout	6	2
By submission	21	4
By decision	3	19
Draws	1	

Res.	Record	Opponent	Method	Event	Date	Round	Time	Location	Notes
Win	30–25–1	Piotr Siwkowski	TKO (elbows)	PLMMA 73: Ciechanów	May 20, 2017	1	1:20	Ciechanów, Poland	
Win	29–25–1	David Ramirez	Submission (rear-naked choke)	PLMMA 72: Łomianki	March 4, 2017	2	N/A	Łomianki, Poland	
Loss	28–25–1	Marcin Naruszczka	Decision (unanimous)	PLMMA 70: Championships	November 4, 2016	5	5:00	Warsaw, Poland	
Loss	28–24–1	Vyacheslav Vasilevsky	Decision (unanimous)	Fightspirit Championship 6: Horwich vs. Vasilevsky	September 9, 2016	3	5:00	Saint Petersburg, Russia	
Loss	28–23–1	Jae Young Kim	KO (punch)	Top FC 9: Battle of Incheon	October 24, 2015	1	0:31	Incheon, South Korea	For the Top FC Middleweight Championship.
Loss	28–22–1	Piotr Strus	Decision (majority)	KSW 25: Khalidov vs. Sakurai	December 7, 2013	3	5:00	Wrocław, Poland	
Win	28–21–1	Terry Martin	TKO (punches)	KSW 21	December 1, 2012	2	4:08	Warsaw, Poland	Catchweight bout of 191 lbs.
Win	27–21–1	Antoni Chmielewski	TKO (punches)	KSW XIX	May 12, 2012	3	2:19	Łódź, Poland	
Loss	26–21–1	Thales Leites	Submission (arm-triangle choke)	Amazon Forest Combat 2	March 31, 2012	2	4:39	Manaus, Brazil	Catchweight bout of 194 lbs.
Loss	26–20–1	Michał Materla	Decision (unanimous)	KSW 17: Revenge	November 26, 2011	3	3:00	Łódź, Poland	KSW Middleweight Championship eliminator; fight went to three-minute OT round.
Loss	26–19–1	Jake Rosholt	Decision (unanimous)	Shark Fights 17: Horwich vs. Rosholt 2	July 15, 2011	3	5:00	Frisco, Texas, United States	
Loss	26–18–1	Danillo Villefort	Decision (unanimous)	Shark Fights 14: Horwich vs. Villefort	March 11, 2011	3	5:00	Lubbock, Texas, United States	
Win	26–17–1	Jake Rosholt	TKO (punches)	Xtreme Fight Night: Rosholt vs. Horwich	November 12, 2010	3	2:56	Tulsa, Oklahoma, United States	
Loss	25–17–1	Eric Schambari	Decision (split)	Bellator 28	September 9, 2010	3	5:00	New Orleans, Louisiana, United States	
Win	25–16–1	Thales Leites	Submission (rear-naked choke)	Powerhouse World Promotions: War on the Mainland	August 14, 2010	4	0:44	Irvine, California, United States	Won PWP Middleweight Championship.
Loss	24–16–1	Tom Watson	Decision (unanimous)	BAMMA 3	May 15, 2010	5	5:00	Birmingham, England	For the inaugural BAMMA World Middleweight Championship.
Loss	24–15–1	Jason MacDonald	Decision (unanimous)	LGIO MMA 1: MacDonald vs Horwich	April 23, 2010	3	5:00	Edmonton, Alberta, Canada	
Win	24–14–1	Jason Lambert	Decision (split)	AMMA 1: First Blood	October 24, 2009	3	5:00	Edmonton, Alberta, Canada	
Loss	23–14–1	Bryan Baker	Decision (unanimous)	Bellator 10	June 5, 2009	3	5:00	Ontario, California, United States	
Loss	23–13–1	Ricardo Almeida	Decision (unanimous)	UFC Fight Night: Condit vs. Kampmann	April 1, 2009	3	5:00	Nashville, Tennessee, United States	
Loss	23–12–1	Dan Miller	Decision (unanimous)	UFC 90	October 25, 2008	3	5:00	Rosemont, Illinois, United States	
Win	23–11–1	Joey Guel	Decision (unanimous)	IFL: Mohegan Sun	May 16, 2008	3	4:00	Uncasville, Connecticut, United States	
Loss	22–11–1	Ryan McGivern	Decision(unanimous)	IFL: Vegas	February 29, 2008	5	4:00	Las Vegas, Nevada, United States	Lost IFL Middleweight Championship.
Win	22–10–1	Benji Radach	KO (punch)	IFL: World Grand Prix Finals	December 29, 2007	2	1:58	Uncasville, Connecticut, United States	Won the inaugural IFL Middleweight Champion.
Win	21–10–1	Brian Foster	Submission (armbar)	IFL: World Grand Prix Semifinals	November 3, 2007	1	3:59	Chicago, Illinois, United States	Catchweight bout of 188 lbs.
Win	20–10–1	Kazuhiro Hamanaka	KO (head kick)	IFL: Everett	June 1, 2007	1	2:07	Everett, Washington, United States	
Loss	19–10–1	Jamal Patterson	Submission (guillotine choke)	IFL: Connecticut	April 13, 2007	1	0:37	Uncasville, Connecticut, United States	
Win	19–9–1	Brent Beauparlant	Submission (kimura)	IFL: Atlanta	February 23, 2007	2	0:28	Atlanta, Georgia, United States	
Loss	18–9–1	Ryan McGivern	Decision (unanimous)	IFL: Championship Final	December 29, 2006	3	4:00	Uncasville, Connecticut, United States	
Win	18–8–1	Mike Pyle	Submission (rear-naked choke)	IFL: World Championship Semifinals	November 2, 2006	2	1:02	Portland, Oregon, United States	
Win	17–8–1	Bristol Marunde	Decision (unanimous)	IFL: Portland	September 9, 2006	3	4:00	Portland, Oregon, United States	
Loss	16–8–1	Jamal Patterson	Submission (rear-naked choke)	IFL: Legends Championship 2006	April 29, 2006	1	2:57	Atlantic City, New Jersey, United States	
Loss	16–7–1	Roan Carneiro	Decision (split)	WCFC: No Guts No Glory	March 18, 2006	3	5:00	Manchester, England	
Win	16–6–1	Petras Markevicius	Submission (rear naked choke)	WCFC: No Guts No Glory	March 18, 2006	1	4:59	Manchester, England	
Loss	15–6–1	Brian Ebersole	Decision (unanimous)	Strikeforce: Shamrock vs. Gracie	March 10, 2006	3	5:00	San Jose, California, United States	
Win	15–5–1	Rob Wince	Submission (armbar)	ACF: Genesis	February 24, 2006	1	1:46	Denver, Colorado, United States	
Win	14–5–1	John Cronk	Submission (rear naked choke)	SF 13: Rocky Mountain Sportfight	October 15, 2005	2	3:28	Denver, Colorado, United States	
Win	13–5–1	Vernon White	Submission (rear-naked choke)	SF 12: Breakout	September 16, 2005	2	2:38	Portland, Oregon, United States	
Win	12–5–1	Krzysztof Soszynski	Submission (rear-naked choke)	Freedom Fight: Canada vs USA	July 9, 2005	2	0:52	Hull, Quebec, Canada	
Loss	11-5-1	Travis Wiuff	Decision (unanimous)	Extreme Challenge 62	June 18, 2005	3	5:00	Medina, Minnesota, United States	
Win	11–4–1	Brian Wieber	Submission (rear-naked choke)	XFC: Dome of Destruction 2	April 30, 2005	1	2:37	Tacoma, Washington, United States	
Loss	10–4–1	Trevor Prangley	Decision (unanimous)	SF 9: Respect	March 26, 2005	3	5:00	Gresham, Oregon, United States	
Win	10–3–1	Chris Kiever	Submission (triangle choke)	Kickdown Classic 16	February 19, 2005	2	0:40	Denver, Colorado, United States	
Loss	9–3–1	Jason Lambert	TKO (submission to punches)	WEC 12	October 21, 2004	2	3:28	Lemoore, California, United States	
Win	9–2–1	Jason MacDonald	Submission (armbar)	Extreme Fighting Challenge 3	October 16, 2004	1	N/A	Prince George, British Columbia, Canada	
Win	8–2–1	Billy Miles	Submission (rear-naked choke)	SF 6: Battleground in Reno	September 23, 2004	2	0:59	Reno, Nevada, United States	
Win	7–2–1	Antony Rea	Submission (rear-naked choke)	APEX: Genesis	September 5, 2004	2	1:13	Montreal, Quebec, Canada	
Win	6–2–1	Paul Purcell	Submission (rear-naked choke)	SF 5: Stadium	August 28, 2004	1	N/A	Gresham, Oregon, United States	
Win	5–2–1	Mikko Rupponen	Submission (triangle choke)	PFA: Pride and Fury	June 3, 2004	3	0:50	Worley, Idaho, United States	
Win	4–2–1	Chris Kiever	Submission (triangle choke)	Cage Fighting Championship 1	May 1, 2004	1	1:47	Salt Lake City, Utah, United States	
Loss	3–2–1	Glover Teixeira	Decision (unanimous)	SF 3: Dome	April 17, 2004	3	5:00	Gresham, Oregon, United States	
Win	3–1–1	Horace Spencer	Submission (rear-naked choke)	SF 2: On the Move	March 19, 2004	1	4:45	Portland, Oregon, United States	
Win	2–1–1	Joshua Burkman	Submission (triangle choke)	SF 1: Revolution	February 21, 2004	2	2:11	Portland, Oregon, United States	
Loss	1–1–1	Rich Guerin	Submission (armbar)	DesertBrawl 9	November 8, 2003	1	1:54	Bend, Oregon, United States	
Draw	1–0–1	Shane Davis	Draw	Ultimate Ring Challenge 6	October 25, 2003	3	3:00	Longview, Washington, United States	
Win	1–0	Cory Devela	Submission (rear-naked choke)	PPKA: Ultimate Fight Night 2	September 6, 2003	2	1:24	Pasco, Washington, United States	

New championship	1st IFL Middleweight Champion; December 29, 2007 - February 29, 2008	Succeeded by Ryan McGivern
