= Nate Marquardt =

American mixed martial arts fighter

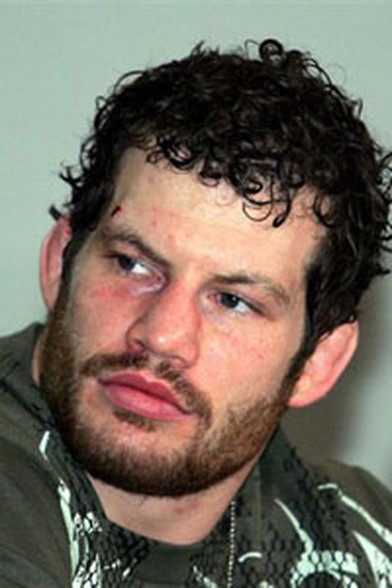
- Born: Nathan Joel Marquardt; April 20, 1979 (age 47); Lander, Wyoming, United States
- Other names: The Great
- Nationality: American
- Height: 6 ft 0 in (1.83 m)
- Weight: 185 lb (84 kg; 13.2 st)
- Division: Lightweight (1999); Middleweight (2000–2011, 2014–2017); Welterweight (2012–2014)
- Reach: 74 in (188 cm)
- Stance: Orthodox
- Fighting out of: Denver, Colorado, United States
- Team: High Altitude Martial Arts; Sanford MMA
- Rank: 2nd degree black belt in Brazilian Jiu-Jitsu under Ricardo Murgel; 2nd degree black belt in Jujutsu under Shane Pitts; 2nd degree black belt in Pancrase Mixed Martial Arts
- Years active: 1999–2017, 2021–present

Mixed martial arts record
- Total: 58
- Wins: 36
- By knockout: 11
- By submission: 17
- By decision: 8
- Losses: 20
- By knockout: 6
- By submission: 2
- By decision: 12
- Draws: 2

Other information
- Notable students: Shane Carwin Cody Donovan
- Website: www.natemarquardt.com
- Mixed martial arts record from Sherdog

Nathan Joel Marquardt (born April 20, 1979) is an American mixed martial artist who competed in the middleweight and welterweight division of the Ultimate Fighting Championship. A professional competitor since 1999, he is a former Strikeforce Welterweight Champion and a three-time Pancrase Middleweight Champion.

== Background ==
Marquardt was born in Lander, Wyoming to a father of German origin, and a mother of Welsh origin. He was raised along with his four other siblings in Denver, Colorado. Marquardt's late father was a Lutheran pastor, worked in construction, and was also a Marine veteran who fought in the Vietnam War. Marquardt's mother was a nurse and a manager at an attorney's office. Because of his father's work he and his family moved around frequently to places including Chicago, Illinois, and Indiana. Marquardt's parents divorced when he was eight years old, and the young Marquardt moved to Colorado. When he was 15 years old, he began studying the disciplines of Wing Chun Kung Fu, Japanese Jujutsu, Freestyle Wrestling, and Kenpo Karate. Present Marquardt's fighting style derived from his fights in Pancrase under the leadership of Sheldon Marr from Colorado. Sheldon Marr is the co-founder of the World Combat JuJitsu Association and he was a Junior National Judo Champion, and a California State Wrestling Champion and has been recognized as the "Instructor of the Year" by Jujitsu America, the U.S. Martial Arts Hall of Famer, the World Martial Arts Hall of Famer, and the International Black Belt Hall of Fame; and was a Coach for the 2000 U.S. World Pankration Team, and the 2007, 2008, 2009, 2010, 2011, 2012 & 2013 U.S. World Grappling Teams. Marquardt also trained with Shane Pitts in Colorado before he went to Jackson's MMA. Shane Pitts trained Marquardt in Japanese jujutsu for three years and gave him a black belt. Pitts is the founder of Law Enforcement Ground Tactics System, holder of five black belts in martial arts, a former World Masters Judo Champion, World Combat Jujitsu Association National Champion and Brazilian Jiu Jitsu Pan American Masters Division Champion. Marquardt also trained with Mike Van Arsdale and also trained Pancrase with Sanae Kikuta in the GRABAKA Dojo in Tokyo, Japan. Marquardt was active in other sports as well, including basketball and soccer, at Wheat Ridge High School and also began taking Kickboxing and Brazilian Jiu-Jitsu lessons when he was 18 years old under the instruction of Ricardo Murgel.

== Mixed martial arts career ==
=== Pancrase ===
Marquardt began his professional mixed martial arts career in 1999, and amassing victories in various promotions before entering the Bas Rutten Invitational 4 tournament, which was organized in such a manner that the tournament winner was to be offered a contract with the Ultimate Fighting Championship. Despite winning the tournament, Marquardt was offered no such contract. Instead, he signed with Japan's Pancrase organization, which had fostered such fighters as Ken Shamrock and Bas Rutten. In his first Pancrase fight, Marquardt lost via submission to Genki Sudo.

Invited back to Pancrase for a middleweight elimination tournament, Marquardt defeated Daiju Takase, Kiuma Kunioku, and Shonie Carter to become the first middleweight King of Pancrase. Marquardt defended this title twice before being defeated by Kunioku in December 2001. A final encounter between the two fighters in December 2002 saw Marquardt defeat Kunioku once again to recapture the King of Pancrase championship, which he held for nearly a year.

On November 30, 2003, Marquardt was involved in a brief altercation with Ricardo Almeida in a Pancrase title fight. Marquardt tapped out to a guillotine choke, however, the referee was unable to immediately separate the fighters, and Almeida continued to apply the choke, posing for ringside cameras. After he was freed, Marquardt threw a strike at Almeida's face, prompting both corners to storm into the ring, including Renzo Gracie. Renzo was cornering Almeida, and once in the ring he kicked Marquardt in the face. The confrontation eventually came to an end, and Marquardt approached Almeida after the bout to congratulate him. After Almeida vacated his title in July 2004, Marquardt proceeded to regain the championship in a victory over Kazuo Misaki at Pancrase: Brave 10.

On May 1, 2005, Marquardt defeated Izuru Takeuchi, winning the Pancrase Middleweight Championship for the seventh time, becoming the only fighter to ever accomplish such a feat.

=== Ultimate Fighting Championship ===
Marquardt made his UFC debut on August 6, 2005, live on Spike TV, headlining the inaugural UFC Ultimate Fight Night card in Las Vegas, Nevada. Although Marquardt earned a unanimous decision victory over UFC veteran Ivan Salaverry, a post-fight drug test revealed high levels of nandrolone, an anabolic steroid, in Marquardt's system which led to the Nevada State Athletic Commission filing for his suspension. Marquardt maintains that he only used over-the-counter supplements in preparation for the fight. Marquardt was initially suspended for six months and assessed no fine. Marquardt's suspension was reduced to five months and he was reinstated in January 2006.

With the drug testing controversy resolved, Marquardt was set to make his return at UFC 58, against veteran Joe Doerksen. The fight proved to be a successful endeavor for Marquardt, as he won a unanimous decision. In the post-fight interview, Marquardt stated his goals of capturing the UFC Middleweight Championship and his intention to fight then-champion Rich Franklin. Marquardt then fought Crafton Wallace, a replacement for Marquardt's original opponent, Thales Leites, on the undercard of Ortiz vs. Shamrock 3: The Final Chapter on October 10, 2006. Marquardt won by rear-naked choke in the second round. Due to his commitment to the UFC, Marquardt relinquished his title as the Pancrase Middleweight Championship that same month.

At UFC Fight Night 8, Marquardt notched a dominant unanimous three-round decision victory over ADCC Champion grappler Dean Lister that saw two judges score the bout 30-25 for Marquardt.

==== Middleweight title shot ====
Following that victory and a 4-0 debut in the UFC, Marquardt was scheduled to compete for the UFC Middleweight Championship held by Anderson Silva on July 7, 2007 at UFC 73. Marquardt lost the championship bout by TKO due to strikes at 4:50 in the first round of the fight.

==== Road back to title contention ====
After early speculation that Marquardt's contract with the UFC could expire without renewal, he confirmed that a new agreement had been signed with the organization. Marquardt's next match was to be against Thales Leites at UFC 81, but Leites withdrew from the bout due to an injured hand. This marked the second time that a bout between Leites and Marquardt had been cancelled. On January 9, the UFC announced that veteran Jeremy Horn would be Leites' replacement. Marquardt defeated Horn via guillotine choke in the second round.

Marquardt finally fought Thales Leites at UFC 85, a fight that had been postponed on two separate occasions since 2006. Marquardt was winning the fight very dominantly, but landed an illegal knee strike to the head of Leites in the second round costing him a point. In the third round Marquardt landed an elbow to the side of the head of Leites, costing him a second point. Referee Herb dean thought it was an illegal strike, and deducted a second point. The strike was to the side of the head and clearly legal in the replay. However, the deducted points proved to be crucial as Leites was deemed victorious in a very close split decision, giving Leites a title shot against Anderson Silva. Marquardt was next scheduled to face Martin Kampmann at UFC 88. Nate defeated Kampmann in 82 seconds by throwing a head kick and landing a barrage of strikes to take the win by TKO in the first round.

Marquardt obtained a second straight win to launch himself back into the title picture at UFC 95, when he defeated well-regarded Brazilian fighter Wilson Gouveia with another barrage of strikes to earn a third-round TKO.

Marquardt's next fight was against the then-undefeated submission specialist Demian Maia at UFC 102, which he won via KO 21 seconds into the first round by landing a counter straight right as Maia threw a leaping leg kick. Maia fell face down, unable to protect himself. Nate rushed in to follow up with a right hook, but stopped himself once he saw that Maia was visibly hurt. This fight earned him a $60,000 Knockout of the Night award.

Following his victory over Maia, Marquardt was scheduled to fight Dan Henderson to determine number one contendership to Silva's Middleweight Championship. Henderson left the UFC for Strikeforce after attempts to agree on a new contract failed. A new bout was arranged between Marquardt and American wrestler Chael Sonnen, scheduled for UFC 110 and later moved to UFC 109. Marquardt was taken down at will by Sonnen multiple times during each round. Although able to lock in a guillotine choke late in the third round, Marquardt was not able to finish the submission attempt and lost the fight in an upset via unanimous decision. This fight earned him a $60,000 Fight of the Night award.

Marquardt was expected to face Alessio Sakara on July 3, 2010 at UFC 116 but the fight was cancelled after Sakara pulled out due to the death of his father.

Marquardt was expected to face Rousimar Palhares on August 28, 2010 at UFC 118, however the bout was moved to September 15, 2010 to headline UFC Fight Night 22 after Alan Belcher was forced to pull out of his bout with Demian Maia with an eye injury. Marquardt defeated Palhares via first-round TKO. During the fight, Palhares went for a heel-hook from which Marquardt slipped his leg free and Palhares looked at the referee and pointed to Marquardt's legs, seemingly complaining that Marquardt was greased. Marquardt capitalized on the opening and pounded Palhares with a quick barrage of punches to get the stoppage. The ending, though, was not due to any illegal circumstances. UFC broadcaster Joe Rogan immediately announced that Marquardt had passed an inspection from the ringside physician and the referee. Marquardt explained that before the fight; "I came out really warm because I wanted a good sweat," which explains why he was slippery and managed to remain elusive.

Less than a week after his win over Palhares, Marquardt was tapped to make a quick return to the Octagon to face Yushin Okami in a middleweight title eliminator bout on November 13, 2010 at UFC 122, replacing Vitor Belfort, as Vitor was promoted to a title fight because of Chael Sonnen's suspension for PEDs. Marquardt lost to Okami via unanimous decision.

Marquardt was expected to face Yoshihiro Akiyama on March 19, 2011 at UFC 128. However, Akiyama pulled out of the bout and was replaced by Dan Miller. Marquardt won the fight via unanimous decision.

==== Drop to welterweight and release from UFC ====
After defeating Miller, Nate's teammate, Georges St-Pierre, gave him the idea of dropping down to the welterweight division. Marquardt was expected to debut at welterweight against Anthony Johnson on June 26, 2011 at UFC on Versus 4. However, Johnson was forced out of the bout with a shoulder injury and replaced by Rick Story. Marquardt pulled out of the fight with Story the day of the weigh-ins due to not receiving medical clearance. The UFC at the UFC on Versus 4 weigh-in announced that Marquardt did not pass the required physical. According to a video posted by Dana White on his Twitter, Marquardt was released by the UFC due to failing "medical requirements".

On June 28, 2011, Nate appeared on MMA Hour with Ariel Helwani and stated that in August 2010 he felt tired and moody and his doctor discovered he had low testosterone levels. That doctor put Nate on hormone replacement therapy, and when Nate applied for a Therapeutic Use Exemption with the New Jersey state commission, they allowed it but declared that he must go off the therapy for ten weeks, then have his levels retested by a specialist to determine if he really needs to be on the therapy or not. At the end of that period, both the specialist and Nate's primary doctor agreed his levels really were low and he was a candidate for replacement therapy. Nate's primary doctor injected him with testosterone to quickly get his levels back up in time for his scheduled fight against Story. The Pennsylvania commission had set standards for what his testosterone levels could be at fight time and Nate's levels, though trending down over the last week before the fight, still failed to fall to within the range required in time for him to be cleared to fight. Nate claimed that he retook tests on the day of the fight and was actually within qualifying limits, thus having his suspension lifted by the commission.

=== BAMMA ===
Shortly after having his suspension lifted by the Pennsylvania State Athletic Commission, Marquardt signed with top U.K. fight promotion BAMMA, the British Association of Mixed Martial Arts. He told MMAWeekly.com that a large part of the reason for signing with BAMMA was that even though the U.K. does not conduct governmental sanctioning of MMA, BAMMA officials were moving ahead with their own plans to self-regulate, including medical screening and drug testing.

He was set to make his promotional debut at BAMMA 9: Marquardt vs Yoshida on February 11, 2012 against Yoshiyuki Yoshida to determine the inaugural BAMMA World Welterweight Champion.

On January 13, 2012, Marquardt was released from his contract with BAMMA officially due to the promotion pushing back BAMMA 9, and therefore his promotional debut, to March 24, 2012.

=== Strikeforce ===
Dana White announced that Marquardt had signed with Strikeforce. His debut took place at Strikeforce: Rockhold vs. Kennedy against Tyron Woodley in a bout for the vacant Strikeforce Welterweight Championship. Nate knocked out Woodley in the fourth round, becoming the new Strikeforce Welterweight Champion.

Marquardt's first defense was against Tarec Saffiedine on January 12, 2013 at Strikeforce: Marquardt vs. Saffiedine. He lost the belt via unanimous decision.

=== Return to UFC and retirement ===
Marquardt faced Jake Ellenberger on March 16, 2013 at UFC 158. He lost the bout via first-round KO.

Marquardt faced Héctor Lombard on October 19, 2013 at UFC 166. He lost the fight via knockout in the first round.

Marquardt made a return to the middleweight division to face James Te-Huna on June 28, 2014 at UFC Fight Night 43. He won the fight via first round submission due to straight armbar. This fight earned him a Performance of the Night award.

Marquardt faced Brad Tavares on January 3, 2015 at UFC 182. He lost the fight by unanimous decision.

Marquardt faced Kelvin Gastelum on June 13, 2015 at UFC 188. He lost the fight via TKO after his corner stopped the fight between the second and third round.

Marquardt faced C. B. Dollaway on December 19, 2015 at UFC on Fox 17. He won the fight via knockout in the second round.

Marquardt next faced Thiago Santos on May 14, 2016 at UFC 198. He lost the fight via knockout in the first round.

Marquardt next faced Tamdan McCrory on October 1, 2016 at UFC Fight Night 96. Marquardt won the fight via knockout in the second round and was awarded a Performance of the Night bonus.

Marquardt faced Sam Alvey on January 28, 2017 at UFC on Fox 23. He lost the fight via unanimous decision.

Marquardt faced Vitor Belfort on June 3, 2017 at UFC 212. He lost the fight via unanimous decision. Most pundits had Marquardt winning the fight.

Marquardt faced Cezar Ferreira on November 11, 2017 at UFC Fight Night 120. He lost the fight via split decision.

On December 28, 2017, Marquardt announced his retirement from professional MMA fighting after 56 fights over an 18-year MMA career.

=== Return to competition ===
Marquardt came out of retirement for the first time in nearly four years to face Michael Cora on August 6, 2021 at Titan FC 71. He won the bout via armbar submission in the first round.

He next faced Valdir Araujo at XMMA 3 on October 23, 2021. Marquardt lost the bout via TKO after suffering a body kick and punches.

== Personal life ==
Marquardt is married. The couple had their first child together on May 18, 2010. Nate also has a daughter, Emmalie from a previous relationship. Marquardt has an older brother who is in the United States Air Force.

Marquardt is a Christian. Marquardt has said his faith is the most important thing in his life.

Marquardt made a short cameo appearance in the beginning of MC Hammer's music video for the Jay-Z diss track, "Better Run Run" along with Brendan Schaub, Eliot Marshall, and trainer Trevor Wittman. Marquardt also had a small screen appearance in the movie Warrior as Karl "The Dane" Kruller.

== Championships and accomplishments ==
- Strikeforce
  - Strikeforce Welterweight Championship (One time)
  - Fought the last fight in Strikeforce History
- Ultimate Fighting Championship
  - Headlined the First UFC Fight Night
  - Knockout of the Night (One time) vs. Demian Maia
  - Fight of the Night (One time) vs. Chael Sonnen
  - Performance of the Night (Two times) vs. James Te-Huna and Tamdan McCrory
  - Fourth most bouts in UFC Middleweight division history (23)
  - Tied (Chris Leben, Derek Brunson & Brendan Allen) for third most finishes in UFC Middleweight division history (9)
  - Third most top position time in UFC Middleweight division history (59:23)
  - Third most knockdowns landed in UFC Middleweight division history (12)
  - Second highest takedown accuracy percentage in UFC Middleweight division history (58.9%)
  - Tied (Joe Doerksen & Rousimar Palhares) for third most submission attempts in UFC Middleweight division history (14)
  - UFC.com Awards
    - 2009: Ranked #9 Fighter of the Year, Ranked #5 Knockout of the Year vs. Demian Maia & Ranked #8 Knockout of the Year vs. Wilson Gouveia
- Pancrase Hybrid Wrestling
  - Pancrase Middleweight Championship (Three times, First)
  - 2002 Pancrase Spirit Tour Champion
  - 2000 King of Pancrase Middleweight Tournament Champion
- Ring of Fire
  - 2000 Ring of Fire Middleweight Championship (One time)
- World Vale Tudo Federation
  - 1999 World Vale Tudo Federation Championship (One time)
- Bas Rutten Invitational
  - 1999 Bas Rutten Invitational 4 Lightweight Championship (One time)
- Rumble In The Rockies
  - 1999 I.M.A. Rumble In The Rockies Championship (One time)
- MMAMania.com
  - 2010 True Warrior Award
- Fight Matrix
  - 2000 Fighter of the Year

== Mixed martial arts record ==
Professional record breakdown
| 58 matches | 36 wins | 20 losses |
| By knockout | 13 | 6 |
| By submission | 15 | 2 |
| By decision | 8 | 12 |
| Draws | 2 | |

| Res. | Record | Opponent | Method | Event | Date | Round | Time | Location | Notes |
|---|---|---|---|---|---|---|---|---|---|
| Loss | 36–20–2 | Valdir Araujo | TKO (body kick and punches) | XMMA 3: Vice City | October 23, 2021 | 2 | 2:45 | Miami, Florida, United States | |
| Win | 36–19–2 | Michael Cora | Submission (armbar) | Titan FC 71 | August 6, 2021 | 1 | 2:39 | Miami, Florida, United States | |
| Loss | 35–19–2 | Cezar Ferreira | Decision (split) | UFC Fight Night: Poirier vs. Pettis | November 11, 2017 | 3 | 5:00 | Norfolk, Virginia, United States | |
| Loss | 35–18–2 | Vitor Belfort | Decision (unanimous) | UFC 212 | June 3, 2017 | 3 | 5:00 | Rio de Janeiro, Brazil | |
| Loss | 35–17–2 | Sam Alvey | Decision (unanimous) | UFC on Fox: Shevchenko vs. Peña | January 28, 2017 | 3 | 5:00 | Denver, Colorado, United States | |
| Win | 35–16–2 | Tamdan McCrory | KO (punch and head kick) | UFC Fight Night: Lineker vs. Dodson | October 1, 2016 | 2 | 4:44 | Portland, Oregon, United States | Performance of the Night. |
| Loss | 34–16–2 | Thiago Santos | KO (punch) | UFC 198 | May 14, 2016 | 1 | 3:39 | Curitiba, Brazil | |
| Win | 34–15–2 | C. B. Dollaway | KO (punch) | UFC on Fox: dos Anjos vs. Cowboy 2 | December 19, 2015 | 2 | 0:28 | Orlando, Florida, United States | |
| Loss | 33–15–2 | Kelvin Gastelum | TKO (corner stoppage) | UFC 188 | June 13, 2015 | 2 | 5:00 | Mexico City, Mexico | |
| Loss | 33–14–2 | Brad Tavares | Decision (unanimous) | UFC 182 | January 3, 2015 | 3 | 5:00 | Las Vegas, Nevada, United States | |
| Win | 33–13–2 | James Te-Huna | Submission (armbar) | UFC Fight Night: Te Huna vs. Marquardt | June 28, 2014 | 1 | 4:34 | Auckland, New Zealand | Return to middleweight. Performance of the Night. |
| Loss | 32–13–2 | Héctor Lombard | KO (punches) | UFC 166 | October 19, 2013 | 1 | 1:48 | Houston, Texas, United States | |
| Loss | 32–12–2 | Jake Ellenberger | KO (punches) | UFC 158 | March 16, 2013 | 1 | 3:00 | Montreal, Quebec, Canada | |
| Loss | 32–11–2 | Tarec Saffiedine | Decision (unanimous) | Strikeforce: Marquardt vs. Saffiedine | January 12, 2013 | 5 | 5:00 | Oklahoma City, Oklahoma, United States | Lost the Strikeforce Welterweight Championship. |
| Win | 32–10–2 | Tyron Woodley | KO (elbows and punches) | Strikeforce: Rockhold vs. Kennedy | July 14, 2012 | 4 | 1:39 | Portland, Oregon, United States | Welterweight debut. Won the vacant Strikeforce Welterweight Championship. |
| Win | 31–10–2 | Dan Miller | Decision (unanimous) | UFC 128 | March 19, 2011 | 3 | 5:00 | Newark, New Jersey, United States | |
| Loss | 30–10–2 | Yushin Okami | Decision (unanimous) | UFC 122 | November 13, 2010 | 3 | 5:00 | Oberhausen, Germany | UFC Middleweight Championship eliminator. |
| Win | 30–9–2 | Rousimar Palhares | TKO (punches) | UFC Fight Night: Marquardt vs. Palhares | September 15, 2010 | 1 | 3:28 | Austin, Texas, United States | |
| Loss | 29–9–2 | Chael Sonnen | Decision (unanimous) | UFC 109 | February 6, 2010 | 3 | 5:00 | Las Vegas, Nevada, United States | UFC Middleweight Championship eliminator. Fight of the Night. |
| Win | 29–8–2 | Demian Maia | KO (punch) | UFC 102 | August 29, 2009 | 1 | 0:21 | Portland, Oregon, United States | Knockout of the Night. |
| Win | 28–8–2 | Wilson Gouveia | TKO (knee and punches) | UFC 95 | February 21, 2009 | 3 | 3:10 | London, England | |
| Win | 27–8–2 | Martin Kampmann | TKO (punches) | UFC 88 | September 6, 2008 | 1 | 1:22 | Atlanta, Georgia, United States | |
| Loss | 26–8–2 | Thales Leites | Decision (split) | UFC 85 | June 7, 2008 | 3 | 5:00 | London, England | Marquardt was deducted two points during the bout for illegal infractions. |
| Win | 26–7–2 | Jeremy Horn | Submission (guillotine choke) | UFC 81 | February 2, 2008 | 2 | 1:37 | Las Vegas, Nevada, United States | |
| Loss | 25–7–2 | Anderson Silva | TKO (punches) | UFC 73 | July 7, 2007 | 1 | 4:50 | Sacramento, California, United States | For the UFC Middleweight Championship. |
| Win | 25–6–2 | Dean Lister | Decision (unanimous) | UFC Fight Night: Evans vs. Salmon | January 25, 2007 | 3 | 5:00 | Hollywood, Florida, United States | |
| Win | 24–6–2 | Crafton Wallace | Submission (rear-naked choke) | Ortiz vs. Shamrock 3: The Final Chapter | October 10, 2006 | 2 | 1:14 | Hollywood, Florida, United States | |
| Win | 23–6–2 | Joe Doerksen | Decision (unanimous) | UFC 58 | March 4, 2006 | 3 | 5:00 | Las Vegas, Nevada, United States | |
| Win | 22–6–2 | Ivan Salaverry | Decision (unanimous) | UFC Ultimate Fight Night | August 6, 2005 | 3 | 5:00 | Las Vegas, Nevada, United States | Marquardt tested positive for nandrolone. |
| Win | 21–6–2 | Izuru Takeuchi | Submission (rear-naked choke) | Pancrase: Spiral 4 | May 1, 2005 | 3 | 2:19 | Yokohama, Japan | Defended the Pancrase Middleweight Championship. Later vacated title. |
| Win | 20–6–2 | Kazuo Misaki | Decision (unanimous) | Pancrase: Brave 10 | November 7, 2004 | 3 | 5:00 | Tokyo, Japan | Won the vacant Pancrase Middleweight Championship. |
| Draw | 19–6–2 | Eiji Ishikawa | Draw | Pancrase: Brave 6 | June 22, 2004 | 3 | 5:00 | Tokyo, Japan | |
| Loss | 19–6–1 | Ricardo Almeida | Submission (guillotine choke) | Pancrase - Hybrid 10 | November 30, 2003 | 1 | 4:53 | Tokyo, Japan | Lost the Pancrase Middleweight Championship. |
| Win | 19–5–1 | Yuji Hisamatsu | Decision (unanimous) | Pancrase - Hybrid 8 | October 4, 2003 | 2 | 5:00 | Osaka, Japan | |
| Win | 18–5–1 | Steve Gomm | TKO (submission to punches) | IFC: Global Domination | September 6, 2003 | 1 | 3:28 | Denver, Colorado, United States | |
| Loss | 17–5–1 | Keiichiro Yamamiya | Decision (unanimous) | Pancrase - 2003 Neo-Blood Tournament Second Round | July 27, 2003 | 3 | 5:00 | Tokyo, Japan | |
| Win | 17–4–1 | Izuru Takeuchi | KO (punches) | Pancrase - Hybrid 3 | March 8, 2003 | 1 | 1:29 | Tokyo, Japan | Defended the Pancrase Middleweight Championship. |
| Win | 16–4–1 | Kiuma Kunioku | KO (flying knee) | Pancrase: Spirit 9 | December 21, 2002 | 3 | 4:36 | Tokyo, Japan | Won the Pancrase Middleweight Championship. |
| Loss | 15–4–1 | Izuru Takeuchi | Decision (unanimous) | Pancrase: Spirit 7 | October 29, 2002 | 3 | 5:00 | Tokyo, Japan | |
| Win | 15–3–1 | Seiki Ryo | Technical Submission (armbar) | Pancrase: 2002 Neo-Blood Tournament Second Round | July 28, 2002 | 1 | 1:37 | Tokyo, Japan | |
| Win | 14–3–1 | Kazuo Misaki | TKO (elbow injury) | Pancrase: Spirit 3 | March 25, 2002 | 1 | 0:29 | Tokyo, Japan | |
| Loss | 13–3–1 | Kiuma Kunioku | Decision (majority) | Pancrase: Proof 7 | December 1, 2001 | 3 | 5:00 | Yokohama, Japan | Lost the Pancrase Middleweight Championship. |
| Win | 13–2–1 | Yuji Hoshino | Submission (triangle choke) | Pancrase: Proof 6 | October 30, 2001 | 3 | 2:13 | Tokyo, Japan | Defended the Pancrase Middleweight Championship. |
| Loss | 12–2–1 | Gil Castillo | Decision (unanimous) | IFC WC 14 | July 18, 2001 | 5 | 5:00 | Friant, California, United States | For the IFC World Welterweight Championship. |
| Win | 12–1–1 | Masaya Kojima | Submission (armbar) | Pancrase: Proof 3 | May 13, 2001 | 1 | 1:45 | Tokyo, Japan | |
| Win | 11–1–1 | Hikaru Sato | Submission (rear-naked choke) | Pancrase: Proof 2 | March 31, 2001 | 1 | 1:53 | Osaka, Japan | |
| Draw | 10–1–1 | Kiuma Kunioku | Draw (majority) | Pancrase: Trans 7 | December 4, 2000 | 1 | 20:00 | Tokyo, Japan | Retained the Pancrase Middleweight Championship. |
| Win | 10–1 | Shonie Carter | Decision (unanimous) | Pancrase: 2000 Anniversary Show | September 24, 2000 | 2 | 3:00 | Yokohama, Japan | Won the inaugural Pancrase Middleweight Championship. |
| Win | 9–1 | Kiuma Kunioku | Decision (unanimous) | Pancrase: 2000 Anniversary Show | September 24, 2000 | 1 | 10:00 | Yokohama, Japan | King of Pancrase Middleweight Tournament Semifinal. |
| Win | 8–1 | Daiju Takase | KO (knee) | Pancrase: Trans 4 | June 26, 2000 | 2 | 1:30 | Tokyo, Japan | |
| Win | 7–1 | Anthony Washington | TKO (submission to punches) | Ring Of Fire 1 | March 18, 2000 | 1 | 3:01 | Denver, Colorado, United States | Middleweight debut. Won the ROF Middleweight Championship. |
| Loss | 6–1 | Genki Sudo | Submission (armbar) | Pancrase: Breakthrough 11 | December 18, 1999 | 1 | 13:31 | Yokohama, Japan | |
| Win | 6–0 | David Harris | Submission (rear-naked choke) | Bas Rutten Invitational 4 | August 14, 1999 | 1 | 15:01 | Littleton, Colorado, United States | Won the BRI Lightweight Championship. |
| Win | 5–0 | Josh Groves | Submission (triangle choke) | Bas Rutten Invitational 4 | August 14, 1999 | 1 | 1:49 | Littleton, Colorado, United States | BRI Lightweight Championship Semifinal. |
| Win | 4–0 | Yves Edwards | Submission (heel hook) | Bas Rutten Invitational 4 | August 14, 1999 | 1 | 3:04 | Littleton, Colorado, United States | BRI Lightweight Championship Quarterfinal. |
| Win | 3–0 | Jose Garcia | Submission (rear-naked choke) | Rumble in the Rockies | June 7, 1999 | 1 | 3:32 | Denver, Colorado, United States | Won the RITR Lightweight Championship. |
| Win | 2–0 | Josh Medina | Submission (arm-triangle choke) | Rumble in the Rockies | June 7, 1999 | 1 | 0:27 | Denver, Colorado, United States | RITR Lightweight Championship Semifinal. |
| Win | 1–0 | Mike Lee | Submission (rear-naked choke) | World Vale Tudo Federation - Durango | April 17, 1999 | 2 | 2:13 | Durango, Colorado, United States | Won the WVF Lightweight Championship. |

== See also ==
- List of Strikeforce alumni
- List of male mixed martial artists
- List of Pancrase champions

| Vacant Title last held by Nick Diaz | 2nd Strikeforce Welterweight Champion; July 14, 2012 – January 12, 2013 | Succeeded by Tarec Saffiedine |
