= UFC Fight Night: Marquardt vs. Palhares =

UFC mixed martial arts event in 2010

- The poster for UFC Fight Night: Marquardt vs. Palhares
- Promotion: Ultimate Fighting Championship
- Date: September 15, 2010
- Venue: Frank Erwin Center
- City: Austin, Texas
- Attendance: 7,724
- Total gate: $595,900

Event chronology
UFC 118: Edgar vs. Penn 2	UFC Fight Night: Marquardt vs. Palhares	UFC 119: Mir vs. Cro Cop

UFC Fight Night: Marquardt vs. Palhares (also known as UFC Fight Night 22) and originally scheduled as UFC Fight Night: Maia vs. Belcher, was a mixed martial arts event held by the Ultimate Fighting Championship on September 15, 2010, at the Frank Erwin Center in Austin, Texas. The event also served as a lead in to the season premiere of The Ultimate Fighter: Team GSP vs. Team Koscheck.

== Background ==
The card for the event was plagued with numerous injuries, with multiple potential fights being called off as a result.

Jim Miller and Gleison Tibau were reported to be fighting at UFC Live: Jones vs. Matyushenko, but the fight was moved to this card.

On August 1, 2010, Alan Belcher withdrew from the main event fight with Demian Maia after undergoing emergency eye surgery.

On August 2, 2010, the bout between Nate Marquardt and Rousimar Palhares, which was originally scheduled for UFC 118 was moved to this event to serve as the new main event. As a result of this, Maia was moved to UFC 118 where he defeated Mario Miranda by unanimous decision in the same slot as the Marquardt vs. Palhares bout would have been.

On August 9, 2010, it was announced Tomasz Drwal would face David Branch because both of their original opponents had to withdraw from their bouts due to injury. Nick Catone, who was scheduled to fight Drwal, needed shoulder and back surgery. Aaron Simpson, who was scheduled to fight Branch, had a staph infection in his elbow.

On August 18, 2010, Mac Danzig was pulled from his UFC 115 rematch with Matt Wiman due to an unknown injury. Efraín Escudero was then pulled from a bout with John Gunderson to face Wiman in the co-main event, but Wiman broke his arm while training. Escudero instead faced touted prospect Charles Oliveira, while Gunderson faced returning UFC veteran Yves Edwards. The Danzig/Wiman rematch was rescheduled for UFC Live: Cruz vs. Johnson in October 2011, where Wiman won by unanimous decision.

During the weigh-in, Efrain Escudero weighed in at 159 lb, resulting in his bout with Charles Oliveira becoming a catchweight bout.

== Results ==
Main card
Weight class				Method	Round	Time	Notes
Middleweight	Nate Marquardt	def.	Rousimar Palhares	TKO (punches)	1	3:28
Catchweight (159 lb)	Charles Oliveira	def.	Efraín Escudero	Submission (rear-naked choke)	3	2:25
Lightweight	Jim Miller	def.	Gleison Tibau	Decision (unanimous) (30–27, 30–27, 29–28)	3	5:00
Lightweight	Cole Miller	def.	Ross Pearson	Submission (rear-naked choke)	2	1:49
Preliminary card
Lightweight	Yves Edwards	def.	John Gunderson	Decision (unanimous) (30–27, 30–27, 30–27)	3	5:00
Light Heavyweight	Kyle Kingsbury	def.	Jared Hamman	Decision (unanimous) (29–28, 29–28, 29–28)	3	5:00
Middleweight	David Branch	def.	Tomasz Drwal	Decision (unanimous) (30–27, 30–27, 30–27)	3	5:00
Middleweight	Rich Attonito	def.	Rafael Natal	Decision (unanimous) (29–28, 29–28, 30–27)	3	5:00
Welterweight	TJ Waldburger	def.	David Mitchell	Decision (unanimous) (30–27, 30–27, 30–27)	3	5:00
Welterweight	Brian Foster	def.	Forrest Petz	TKO (punches)	1	1:07	(Note: This bout aired on the broadcast following the Miller vs Tibau bout.)

== Controversy ==
Marquardt defeated Rousimar Palhares via TKO (punches) at 3:28 of round 1 at the main-event of UFC Fight Night 22. During the fight Palhares went for a heel-hook however Marquardt slipped his leg free and quickly turned the tables for a first-round TKO victory. However, this came with some controversy. Once Marquardt pulled his leg free, Palhares looked at his hand and signalled to officials and seemingly complained that Marquardt was greased. Marquardt capitalized on the opening and pounded Palhares with a quick barrage of punches. The ending, though, wasn't due to any illegal circumstances. UFC broadcaster Joe Rogan immediately announced that Marquardt had passed an inspection from the ringside physician and the referee. Marquardt explained that before the fight; "I came out really warm because I wanted a good sweat," which explains why he was slippery and managed to remain elusive. Marquardt's trainer Greg Jackson stated that officials checked Marquardt before the fight for any greasing type substance.

== Bonus awards ==
The following fighters received $40,000 bonuses.

- Fight of the Night: Jared Hamman vs. Kyle Kingsbury
- Knockout of the Night: Brian Foster
- Submissions of the Night: Cole Miller and Charles Oliveira

== See also ==
- Ultimate Fighting Championship
- List of UFC champions
- List of UFC events
- 2010 in UFC
