= Demian Maia =

Brazilian mixed martial artist (born 1977)

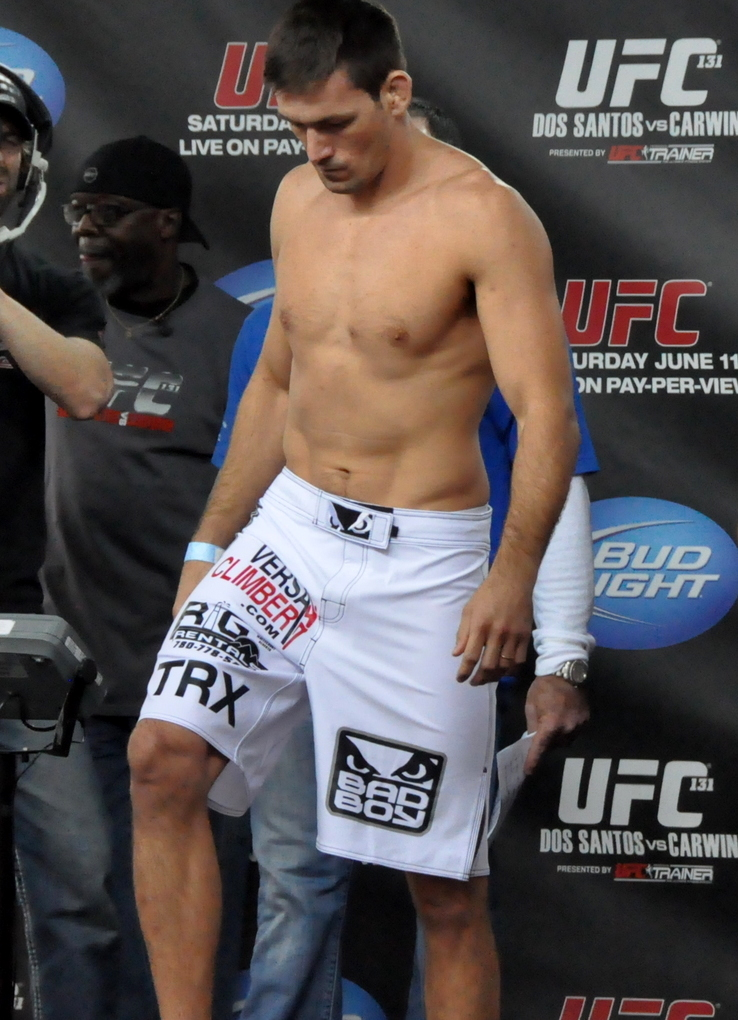
- Maia in 2011
- Born: Demian Augusto Maia Baptista; 6 November 1977 (age 48); São Paulo, Brazil
- Height: 6 ft 0 in (183 cm)
- Weight: 170 lb (77 kg; 12 st 2 lb)
- Division: Middleweight (2005–2012); Welterweight (2012–present)
- Reach: 72 in (183 cm)
- Style: Brazilian jiu-jitsu
- Stance: Southpaw
- Team: Demian Maia Jiu-Jitsu; Brasa Clube de Jiu-Jitsu; Masters Academy; Alliance Jiu Jitsu
- Rank: 5th degree black belt in Brazilian jiu-jitsu (Note: under Fabio Gurgel)
- Years active: 2001–2021

Mixed martial arts record
- Total: 39
- Wins: 28
- By knockout: 3
- By submission: 14
- By decision: 11
- Losses: 11
- By knockout: 2
- By decision: 9

Other information
- University: Cásper Líbero
- Website: demianmaia.com
- Mixed martial arts record from Sherdog

Demian Augusto Maia Baptista (born 6 November 1977) is a Brazilian former professional mixed martial artist, submission grappler and 5th degree Brazilian jiu-jitsu (BJJ) black belt.

Maia competed in both the Welterweight and Middleweight divisions of the Ultimate Fighting Championship (UFC). He has competed in two UFC title fights, losing against Anderson Silva for the UFC Middleweight Championship in 2010 and Tyron Woodley for the UFC Welterweight Championship in 2017. In submission grappling, Maia has won gold medals at the ADCC World Championships, the World Jiu-Jitsu Cup, and Pan-American Championships.

== Background ==
Born in São Paulo, Brazil, Maia trained in judo as a child. He began at the age of four and trained until he was six. When he became a teenager, he also began studying kung fu and karate. By age nineteen, Maia was introduced to Brazilian jiu-jitsu by his cousin. After four years and seven months, Demian received his black belt. Demian Maia finished college and graduated with a degree in journalism. As of 2021, he is a fifth-degree black belt in Brazilian jiu-jitsu and has won several major tournaments with Team Brasa. Maia has previously credited a three-hour private lesson he once took with Rickson Gracie as one of the moments that had the biggest impact on his approach to jiu-jitsu and changed it entirely.

== Mixed martial arts career ==
=== Early career ===
On 21 September 2001, fought against Raul Sosa at Tormenta en el Ring in Caracas, Venezuela. Maia defeated Sosa by TKO in just 48 seconds to win his MMA debut. After a four-year layoff, he returned to submit Lukasz Chewlicki by armbar at The Cage Vol. 4 – Redemption. Maia next competed at Super Challenge 1, earning three victories in one night to be crowned the 2007 Super Challenge Champion in the under-83 kg division. In 2007, he competed in GFC – Evolution against Ryan Stout. Early in the first round, Stout's shoulder popped out of its socket after Maia reversing him into a mount, causing a stoppage due to injury.

=== Ultimate Fighting Championship ===
It was reported on 7 August 2007, that Maia had signed a contract with the UFC. He was originally matched against veteran Marvin Eastman, but Eastman pulled out due to eye surgery. Ryan Jensen, who trained with Team Quest, was named as his replacement. The preliminary bout took place on 20 October at UFC 77 in Cincinnati, Ohio. Maia won by rear naked choke in the first round and was awarded the Submission of the Night award, which paid him an extra $40,000.

Maia next fought TUF 3 finalist Ed Herman, another Team Quest fighter, at UFC 83 in Montreal, Quebec, Canada on 19 April 2008. Maia defeated Herman by technical submission due to a mounted triangle choke at 2:27 of the second round. He again earned Submission of the Night honors for the victory, which paid him $75,000.

Maia's third fight was at UFC 87 where he took on fellow Brazilian jiu-jitsu black belt Jason MacDonald. Both fighters entered the cage having won back-to-back Submission of the Night honors in the UFC. Maia went on to defeat MacDonald by rear naked choke at 2:44 of the third round, earning $60,000 for another Submission of the Night bonus. With this award he became the first UFC fighter to earn three consecutive Submissions of the Night awards. His four consecutive dominating submissions in the UFC have quickly brought his skills to the forefront as possibly being the best pure grappler in the UFC.

Maia defeated heavy handed striker Nate Quarry at UFC 91 by rear naked choke in the first round. After the fight, Maia expressed interest in fighting Michael Bisping next.

Instead, Maia would take on WEC standout and future UFC middleweight title contender Chael Sonnen in London, England at UFC 95 on 21 February 2009. During the match, Maia tossed Sonnen over his head using a lateral drop takedown, taking Sonnen to the ground, where Maia immediately achieved mount. Maia then transitioned to a triangle choke, forcing Sonnen to tap at 2:24 of the first round.

Maia's next opponent was former title contender Nate Marquardt at UFC 102 on 29 August. During an exchange of strikes, Maia was knocked out by a straight right hand from Marquardt 21 seconds into the fight, resulting in his first career loss.

Maia faced Dan Miller on 6 February 2010, at UFC 109. Maia won the fight via unanimous decision (30–27, 29–28, and 29–28).

==== Middleweight Championship fight ====
After Vitor Belfort had to pull out of his upcoming match with UFC Middleweight Champion Anderson Silva at UFC 112 due to a shoulder injury suffered in training, Maia was selected to fill the spot and take Silva on for the belt in what would be the UFC's first-ever open-air event in Abu Dhabi, United Arab Emirates.

In the first two rounds, Silva appeared to mock his opponent, while also executing quick, precise striking. In the third round, however, Silva's tempo seemed to change and looked to Maia to be the aggressor of the fight while he largely circled and taunted his opponent. In the fifth round, Silva's lack of action prompted referee Dan Miragliotta to warn Silva for his conduct and the crowd began to side with Maia. After 5 rounds, Silva was declared the winner via unanimous decision.

==== Post-title fight ====
Maia was then expected to fight Alan Belcher on 15 September 2010, at UFC Fight Night 22. However, on 1 August 2010, Belcher withdrew from the fight after undergoing emergency eye surgery for a detached retina. Belcher stated on his Twitter account that he started to lose the vision in his right eye while in Brazil. As a result, Maia was also pulled from the event. He would face Mario Miranda on 28 August 2010, at UFC 118. Maia won the bout via unanimous decision.

Maia faced Kendall Grove on 4 December 2010, at The Ultimate Fighter 12 Finale. where he won by unanimous decision.

Maia faced Mark Muñoz on 11 June 2011, at UFC 131, where he lost a close contest by unanimous decision.

Maia defeated Jorge Santiago on 8 October 2011, at UFC 136 by unanimous decision.

Maia was expected to face Michael Bisping on 28 January 2012, at UFC on Fox 2. However, Bisping replaced an injured Mark Muñoz on the same card against Chael Sonnen, while Maia faced undefeated Chris Weidman at the event. Weidman defeated Maia via unanimous decision. The fight was initially announced as a split decision but the judges actually scored it as a unanimous decision, clarified by UFC President Dana White in a tweet.

==== Drop to welterweight ====
After deciding to drop down to the welterweight division, Maia faced Dong Hyun Kim in a welterweight bout on 7 July 2012, at UFC 148. The bout was stopped in forty-seven seconds by referee Mario Yamasaki, after Maia took Kim down and finished him with strikes from the mounted position. UFC commentator Joe Rogan said that Kim had broken a rib, but it was later revealed that he suffered a major muscle spasm.

Maia fought Rick Story on 13 October 2012, at UFC 153. Maia defeated Story via first round submission due to a neck crank.

Maia next faced Jon Fitch on 2 February 2013, at UFC 156. He dominated the former title challenger for all three rounds, earning a lopsided unanimous decision victory with all three judges scoring the fight 30–27. Maia credited B.J. Penn and his gameplan against Fitch at UFC 127, which Maia admitted he emulated to earn his victory.

Maia was expected to face Josh Koscheck on 3 August 2013, at UFC 163. However, Koscheck was forced out of the bout with an injury and as a result, Maia was pulled from the card as well.

For his fourth fight at welterweight, Maia faced Jake Shields on 9 October 2013, at UFC Fight Night 29. As expected, the contest between the two decorated jiu-jitsu practitioners took place mostly on the ground with Maia losing a split decision.

Maia faced Rory MacDonald at UFC 170 in Las Vegas, Nevada, on 22 February 2014. He lost the fight via unanimous decision. Despite the loss, the bout won Maia his first Fight of the Night bonus award.

Maia was expected to face Mike Pierce on 31 May 2014, at The Ultimate Fighter Brazil 3 Finale. However Pierce had to pull out of the fight due to a broken hand. Pierce was replaced by UFC newcomer Alexander Yakovlev. Maia won the fight via unanimous decision.

Maia was expected to face Mike Pyle on 23 August 2014, at UFC Fight Night 49. However he later came down with a staph infection and was forced to pull out of the bout. It was later revealed that Maia's infection had spread to the bone leading to osteomyelitis in his right clavicle.

Maia faced Ryan LaFlare on 21 March 2015, in the main event at UFC Fight Night 62. Maia won the fight by unanimous decision.

Maia faced Neil Magny on 1 August 2015, at UFC 190. He won the fight via submission with a rear-naked choke in the second round and was awarded a Performance of the Night bonus.

Maia was briefly linked to a fight with Gunnar Nelson on 24 October 2015, at UFC Fight Night 76, but the bout did not materialize for that event as Maia was sidelined with a staph infection on his left leg. The bout eventually took place on 12 December 2015, at UFC 194. Maia won the one-sided fight via unanimous decision (30–26, 30–25, and 30–25).

Maia faced off against Matt Brown on 14 May 2016, at UFC 198. He won the fight via submission in the third round.

Maia next faced Carlos Condit on 27 August 2016, in the main event at UFC on Fox 21. He dominated the fight after quickly getting Condit to the ground and finishing with a rear-naked choke.

Maia faced Jorge Masvidal at UFC 211 on 13 May 2017. Maia was able to takedown Masvidal repeatedly and control him on the ground. He won the fight via split decision.

==== Welterweight title fight and beyond ====
After amassing a seven-fight win streak at welterweight, Maia faced Welterweight champion Tyron Woodley on 29 July 2017 at UFC 214. He lost the fight via unanimous decision.

Maia faced Colby Covington on 28 October 2017 at UFC Fight Night 119. He lost the fight via unanimous decision.

Maia was tabbed as an injury replacement (filling in for Santiago Ponzinibbio) and faced Kamaru Usman on 19 May 2018 at UFC Fight Night 129 He lost the fight via unanimous decision.

Maia faced Lyman Good on 2 February 2019 at UFC Fight Night 144. He won the fight via a standing rear-naked choke submission in the first round, becoming the first person to finish Good in his MMA career.

Maia faced Anthony Rocco Martin on 29 June 2019 at UFC on ESPN: Ngannou vs. dos Santos. He won the fight via majority decision.

Maia faced Ben Askren on 26 October 2019 at UFC on ESPN+ 20. He won the grappling affair via submission in round three. This fight earned him the Fight of the Night award.

Maia faced Gilbert Burns on 14 March 2020 at UFC Fight Night 170. He lost the fight via technical knockout in round one.

Maia faced Belal Muhammad on 12 June 2021 at UFC 263. Maia lost the fight via unanimous decision.

In August 2021, it was reported that Maia had finished his fight contract with the UFC and was removed from the UFC roster.

== Professional grappling career ==
He won the 77–87 kg weight division at 2007 ADCC Submission Wrestling World Championship, defeating Yushin Okami, Rafael Lovato, and Tarsis Humphres before submitting Flavio Almeida with an armbar in the finals. He also won the 2007 Super Challenge under 83 kg belt, defeating Vitelmo Kubis Bandeira by rear naked choke and Gustavo Machado by a judges decision before going on to defeat Fabio Negao by guillotine choke in the finals.

Maia has also defeated top-ranked UFC middleweight and multiple-time Mundial champion Ronaldo "Jacaré" Souza, as well as former UFC heavyweight title challenger and Mundial champion Gabriel Gonzaga twice in grappling competition.

In June, 2021, Maia revealed that he would be returning to grappling competition after he retired from professional MMA. He made his return at BJJ Stars 8 on 30 April 2021. Maia competed in a superfight against fellow MMA veteran Alex Oliveira, submitting him with a triangle choke at 2:11.

Maia was then booked to compete in the main event of Polaris 20 on 25 June 2022 against Benson Henderson. He was unable to submit Henderson but controlled the match, winning a unanimous decision.

On 12 February 2023, Maia was scheduled to compete against Sangwook Kim in the main event superfight of the Spyder BJJ 'Road to Black' final. Maia scored 16 points during the match before submitting Kim with an arm-triangle choke.

Maia announced that he would be competing against fellow UFC veteran Georges St-Pierre in a grappling match at UFC Fight Pass Invitational 6 on 14 December 2023. The match did not go ahead and neither man competed on the card.

Maia will lead a team for the 2024 Brazilian qualifying round of the AIGA Champions League in May, 2024.

== Fighting style and legacy ==
Maia's fighting style is built around his exceptional abilities on the ground, where he has been able to dominate his opponents. Maia has been called the best ground-fighter in the UFC on multiple occasions. Maia uses double and single leg takedowns as well as trips to advance to a dominant position and soften his opponent up with ground and pound, waiting for an opening for a submission. On the ground, Maia prefers to take the back mount, where he will look for a rear-naked choke. In the bottom position, Maia uses single legs to sweep almost exclusively, and was able to sweep Gunnar Nelson repeatedly with his single leg. Maia is also confident enough in his striking to close the distance and initiate takedowns. To date, Maia has never been submitted in an MMA bout.

Due to Maia's grappling prowess, former UFC Heavyweight Champion and fellow Brazilian jiu-jitsu black belt Frank Mir hired him as his jiu-jitsu coach prior to his UFC 100 title fight with Brock Lesnar. Maia has been credited by Mir for bringing the latter's jiu-jitsu skills to different levels, saying "I thought I was actually good at it until I started rolling with him."

== Other ventures ==
In 2020, Maia opened a new academy in São Paulo, which also includes a jiu-jitsu museum.

In 2023, Maia began working as a member of the commentary team for UFC Fight Pass Brazil.

== Personal life ==
Maia is of Russian descent through his mother. He has a wife named Renata, who works for a Brazilian magazine.

Maia has cited UFC Hall of Famer Royce Gracie as his inspiration to pursue a mixed martial arts career, but considers Royce's half-brother Rickson as his primary hero.

In addition to his native Portuguese, Maia speaks Spanish and English.

== Brazilian jiu-jitsu lineage ==
Mitsuyo "Count Koma" Maeda → Carlos Gracie, Sr. → Helio Gracie → Rolls Gracie → Romero "Jacare" Cavalcanti → Fabio Gurgel → Demian Maia

== Championships and accomplishments ==
=== Grappling credentials ===
- ADCC World Submission Wrestling Championships
  - ADCC 2007 77–87 kg: 1st place
  - ADCC 2005 77–87 kg: 2nd place
- IBJJF Pan American Championships
  - 2006 Pan American Champion
- IBJJF World Championships
  - 2001 Brown Belt Medio-Pesado: 2nd Place
  - 2000 Purple Belt Medio-Pesado: 1st Place
  - 1999 Blue Belt Medio: 2nd Place
- CBJJ Brazilian Championships
  - 2006 Black Belt Absolute: 2nd Place & Black Belt Meio-Pesado: 3rd Place
  - 2002 Brown Belt Medio-Pesado: 3rd Place
  - 2001 Brown Belt Medio-Pesado: 1st Place & Brown Belt Medio-Pesado: 3rd Place
- CBJJ Brazilian Team Championships
  - 2003 Brown/Black Pesada: Master, 1st Place
  - 2002 Brown/Black Pesada: Alliance, 2nd Place
  - 2001 Brown/Black Pesada: Alliance, 1st Place
  - 2000 Purple Belt Pesada: Alliance, 1st Place
- CBJJO Copa Del Mundo (World Cup)
  - 2005 −88 kg Black Belt: 1st Place
  - 2003 Black Belt Meio-Pesado: 3rd Place & Black Belt Absolute: 1st Place
  - 2002 Black Belt Meio-Pesado: 1st Place & Black Belt Absolute: 2nd Place

=== Mixed martial arts ===
- Ultimate Fighting Championship
  - Fight of the Night (Two times) vs. Rory MacDonald and Ben Askren
  - Performance of the Night (Two times) vs. Neil Magny and Carlos Condit
  - Submission of the Night (Four times) vs. Ryan Jensen, Ed Herman, Jason MacDonald and Chael Sonnen
  - Tied (Gerald Meerschaert) for third most submission wins in UFC history (11)
    - Most rear-naked choke submission wins in UFC history (9)
    - Tied (Valter Walker) for second longest submission win streak in UFC history (5)
    - Tied (Chris Lytle & Vicente Luque) for second most submission wins in UFC Welterweight division history (6)
    - Fifth most submission attempts in UFC history (27)
  - Tied (Dustin Poirier & Jon Jones) for seventh most wins in UFC history (22)
  - Second most top position time in UFC history (2:01:15)
  - Third most control time in UFC history (2:35:20)
  - UFC Honors Awards
    - 2019: Fan's Choice Submission of the Year Nominee vs. Ben Askren
  - UFC.com Awards
    - 2008: Ranked #8 Submission of the Year & Ranked #5 Fight of the Year vs. Jason MacDonald
    - 2009: Ranked #2 Submission of the Year vs. Chael Sonnen
    - 2012: Ranked #9 Submission of the Year vs. Rick Story
    - 2016: Ranked #7 Submission of the Year vs. Matt Brown
    - 2019: Top 10 Fighter of the Year & Ranked #3 Submission of the Year vs. Ben Askren
- Super Challenge
  - Super Challenge Tournament 182.6 lbs/83 kg (Winner)
- FIGHT! Magazine
  - Newcomer of the Year (2008)
- MMA Junkie
  - 2014 February Fight of the Month vs. Rory MacDonald
- Sherdog
  - 2015 Comeback Fighter of the Year
- World MMA Awards
  - 2008 Breakthrough Fighter of the Year
  - 2019 – July 2020 Submission of the Year vs. Ben Askren at UFC Fight Night: Maia vs. Askren
- MMA Fighting
  - 2008 #4 Ranked UFC Submission of the Year vs. Ed Herman at UFC 83

== Mixed martial arts record ==
Professional record breakdown
39 matches	28 wins	11 losses
By knockout	3	2
By submission	14	0
By decision	11	9

Res.	Record	Opponent	Method	Event	Date	Round	Time	Location	Notes
Loss	28–11	Belal Muhammad	Decision (unanimous)	UFC 263	12 June 2021	3	5:00	Glendale, Arizona, United States	
Loss	28–10	Gilbert Burns	TKO (punches)	UFC Fight Night: Lee vs. Oliveira	14 March 2020	1	2:34	Brasília, Brazil	
Win	28–9	Ben Askren	Technical Submission (rear-naked choke)	UFC Fight Night: Maia vs. Askren	26 October 2019	3	3:54	Kallang, Singapore	Fight of the Night.
Win	27–9	Anthony Rocco Martin	Decision (majority)	UFC on ESPN: Ngannou vs. dos Santos	29 June 2019	3	5:00	Minneapolis, Minnesota, United States	
Win	26–9	Lyman Good	Submission (rear-naked choke)	UFC Fight Night: Assunção vs. Moraes 2	2 February 2019	1	2:38	Fortaleza, Brazil	
Loss	25–9	Kamaru Usman	Decision (unanimous)	UFC Fight Night: Maia vs. Usman	19 May 2018	5	5:00	Santiago, Chile	
Loss	25–8	Colby Covington	Decision (unanimous)	UFC Fight Night: Brunson vs. Machida	28 October 2017	3	5:00	São Paulo, Brazil	
Loss	25–7	Tyron Woodley	Decision (unanimous)	UFC 214	29 July 2017	5	5:00	Anaheim, California, United States	For the UFC Welterweight Championship.
Win	25–6	Jorge Masvidal	Decision (split)	UFC 211	13 May 2017	3	5:00	Dallas, Texas, United States	UFC Welterweight title eliminator.
Win	24–6	Carlos Condit	Submission (rear-naked choke)	UFC on Fox: Maia vs. Condit	27 August 2016	1	1:52	Vancouver, British Columbia, Canada	Performance of the Night.
Win	23–6	Matt Brown	Submission (rear-naked choke)	UFC 198	14 May 2016	3	4:31	Curitiba, Brazil	
Win	22–6	Gunnar Nelson	Decision (unanimous)	UFC 194	12 December 2015	3	5:00	Las Vegas, Nevada, United States	
Win	21–6	Neil Magny	Submission (rear-naked choke)	UFC 190	1 August 2015	2	2:52	Rio de Janeiro, Brazil	Performance of the Night.
Win	20–6	Ryan LaFlare	Decision (unanimous)	UFC Fight Night: Maia vs. LaFlare	21 March 2015	5	5:00	Rio de Janeiro, Brazil	Maia was deducted one point in round 5 for timidity.
Win	19–6	Alexander Yakovlev	Decision (unanimous)	The Ultimate Fighter Brazil 3 Finale: Miocic vs. Maldonado	31 May 2014	3	5:00	São Paulo, Brazil	
Loss	18–6	Rory MacDonald	Decision (unanimous)	UFC 170	22 February 2014	3	5:00	Las Vegas, Nevada, United States	Fight of the Night.
Loss	18–5	Jake Shields	Decision (split)	UFC Fight Night: Maia vs. Shields	9 October 2013	5	5:00	Barueri, Brazil	
Win	18–4	Jon Fitch	Decision (unanimous)	UFC 156	2 February 2013	3	5:00	Las Vegas, Nevada, United States	
Win	17–4	Rick Story	Submission (neck crank)	UFC 153	13 October 2012	1	2:30	Rio de Janeiro, Brazil	
Win	16–4	Dong Hyun Kim	TKO (rib injury)	UFC 148	7 July 2012	1	0:47	Las Vegas, Nevada, United States	Welterweight debut.
Loss	15–4	Chris Weidman	Decision (unanimous)	UFC on Fox: Evans vs. Davis	28 January 2012	3	5:00	Chicago, Illinois, United States	
Win	15–3	Jorge Santiago	Decision (unanimous)	UFC 136	8 October 2011	3	5:00	Houston, Texas, United States	
Loss	14–3	Mark Muñoz	Decision (unanimous)	UFC 131	11 June 2011	3	5:00	Vancouver, British Columbia, Canada	
Win	14–2	Kendall Grove	Decision (unanimous)	The Ultimate Fighter: Team GSP vs. Team Koscheck Finale	4 December 2010	3	5:00	Las Vegas, Nevada, United States	
Win	13–2	Mario Miranda	Decision (unanimous)	UFC 118	28 August 2010	3	5:00	Boston, Massachusetts, United States	
Loss	12–2	Anderson Silva	Decision (unanimous)	UFC 112	10 April 2010	5	5:00	Abu Dhabi, United Arab Emirates	For the UFC Middleweight Championship.
Win	12–1	Dan Miller	Decision (unanimous)	UFC 109	6 February 2010	3	5:00	Las Vegas, Nevada, United States	
Loss	11–1	Nate Marquardt	KO (punch)	UFC 102	29 August 2009	1	0:21	Portland, Oregon, United States	
Win	11–0	Chael Sonnen	Submission (triangle choke)	UFC 95	21 February 2009	1	2:37	London, England	
Win	10–0	Nate Quarry	Submission (rear-naked choke)	UFC 91	15 November 2008	1	2:13	Las Vegas, Nevada, United States	
Win	9–0	Jason MacDonald	Submission (rear-naked choke)	UFC 87	9 August 2008	3	2:44	Minneapolis, Minnesota, United States	Submission of the Night.
Win	8–0	Ed Herman	Technical Submission (mounted triangle choke)	UFC 83	19 April 2008	2	2:27	Montreal, Quebec, Canada	Submission of the Night.
Win	7–0	Ryan Jensen	Submission (rear-naked choke)	UFC 77	20 October 2007	1	2:40	Cincinnati, Ohio, United States	Submission of the Night.
Win	6–0	Ryan Stout	TKO (shoulder injury)	GFC: Evolution	19 May 2007	1	1:54	Columbus, Ohio, United States	
Win	5–0	Fabio Nascimento	Submission (guillotine choke)	Super Challenge 1	7 October 2006	1	0:35	Rio de Janeiro, Brazil	Won the Super Challenge (83 kg) Tournament.
Win	4–0	Gustavo Machado	Decision (unanimous)	Super Challenge 1	7 October 2006	2	5:00	Rio de Janeiro, Brazil	
Win	3–0	Vitelmo Bandeira	Submission (rear-naked choke)	Super Challenge 1	7 October 2006	1	3:30	Rio de Janeiro, Brazil	
Win	2–0	Łukasz Chlewicki	Submission (armbar)	The Cage Vol. 4 - Redemption	3 December 2005	1	4:22	Helsinki, Finland	
Win	1–0	Raul Sosa	TKO (punches)	Tormenta en el Ring	21 September 2001	1	0:48	Caracas, Venezuela	

== Pay-per-view bouts ==
No.	Event	Fight	Date	Venue	City	PPV Buys
1.	UFC 112	Silva vs. Maia	10 April 2010	Concert Arena, Yas Island	Abu Dhabi, United Arab Emirates	500,000

== See also ==
- List of male mixed martial artists
- List of Brazilian jiu-jitsu practitioners
