= UFC 120 =

UFC mixed martial arts event in 2010

UFC 120: Bisping vs. Akiyama
- The poster for UFC 120: Bisping vs. Akiyama
- Promotion: Ultimate Fighting Championship
- Date: October 16, 2010
- Venue: O_{2} Arena
- City: London, United Kingdom
- Attendance: 17,133
- Total gate: $2,560,000

Event chronology
UFC 119: Mir vs. Cro Cop	UFC 120: Bisping vs. Akiyama	UFC 121: Lesnar vs. Velasquez

UFC 120: Bisping vs. Akiyama was a mixed martial arts event held by the Ultimate Fighting Championship on October 16, 2010, at the O_{2} Arena in London, United Kingdom. The card featured six televised MMA bouts, as well as four un-aired preliminary bouts.

The main event featured The Ultimate Fighter 3 winner Michael Bisping and the Japanese judoka Yoshihiro Akiyama. After three rounds, the fight went to a judges decision, where Bisping was victorious with scores of 30–27 being given by all three ringside judges. The co-main event of the evening featured Dan Hardy (who entered the contest having become the first Englishman to compete in a UFC Championship bout, albeit unsuccessfully) and Carlos Condit, the former World Extreme Cagefighting Welterweight champion. Condit was able to knockout Hardy in the opening round; consigning Hardy to his first knockout loss.

The first UK UFC Fan Expo coincided with this event and was held at the Earls Court Exhibition Centre on Friday October 15 and Saturday October 16. Aside from the live broadcast in Britain and Canada, this event aired on the same day, via tape delay, on Spike TV in the U.S.

The event was the fourth the UFC has hosted at the O_{2} Arena in London, England, U.K. and the first since UFC 95. It was also the ninth event held in United Kingdom and the first since UFC 105. UFC 120 was also notable for becoming, at that time, the ninth highest attended event in UFC history.

== Background ==
=== Main event ===
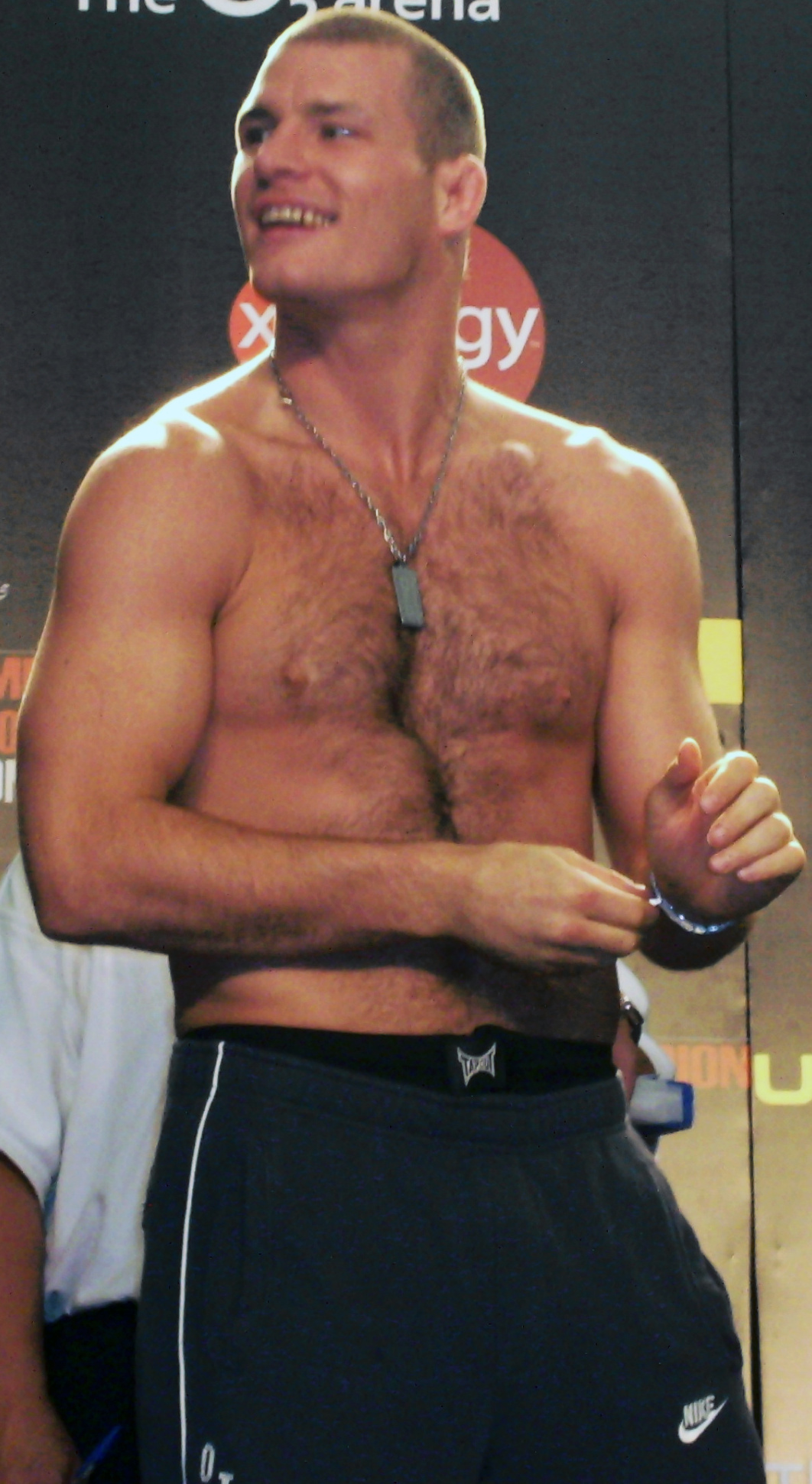
Michael Bisping attempted to maintain his perfect record in Europe and attempted to move closer to title contention

The main event featured The Ultimate Fighter 3 tournament winner Michael Bisping facing off against the Japanese judoka practitioner Yoshihiro Akiyama in a fight contested at the UFC middleweight limit of 185 pounds (84 kg). Michael Bisping sought to defeat Akiyama in his home country in the hope of moving closer to the UFC Middleweight Championship picture. Additionally, Bisping looked to maintain his perfect record in Europe, having only ever been defeated in the United States and Australia.

Bisping came into the fight with an MMA record of 19 wins and 3 losses, of which 9 wins and 3 losses were within the Ultimate Fighting Championship. Bisping had had early success in the promotion, following his win in The Ultimate Fighter 3 – a reality television show produced by the UFC, which consisted of an 8-man tournament, in which Bisping was victorious in the light heavyweight division. Bisping compiled a record of 4 wins and 1 loss as a light heavyweight, before he dropped to the middleweight division. From there, Bisping won 3 straight fights and was selected to be a head coach on the ninth season of The Ultimate Fighter (The Ultimate Fighter: United States vs. United Kingdom) alongside former PRIDE Fighting Championships champion Dan Henderson. His subsequent fight with Henderson began a slightly unsuccessful 2–2 streak for Bisping, as Henderson was able to defeat Bisping via knockout at UFC 100. Bisping followed this up with a comeback win over Denis Kang at UFC 105 (the last English-based UFC event until UFC 120), having survived an early knockdown to eventually win via TKO. Bisping would next face Wanderlei Silva at UFC 110, where Bisping suffered a unanimous decision loss, but he came back at UFC 114 against Dan Miller to claim a convincing decision victory of his own, meaning that Bisping was 2–2 in the last 12 months. Bisping then took the opportunity to improve his coaching staff prior to the bout.

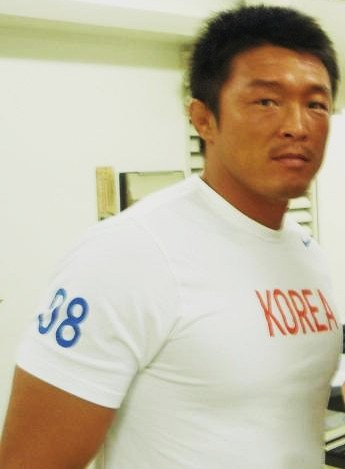
Yoshihiro Akiyama was headlining his first UFC card and looked to rebound from a loss at UFC 116

Akiyama came into the bout with an MMA record of 13 wins, 2 losses and 2 no-contests, of which one win and one loss took place within the Ultimate Fighting Championship. Akiyama was an incredibly popular personality in his home nations of South Korea and Japan and whilst his signing wasn't particularly celebrated in the United States or England, it was big news in the far east, where Akiyama is known not only for his fighting career, but also for his singing career and his status as a mild fashion icon, which led to the forming of his nickname "Sexyama". Despite his popularity in the far east, Akiyama had not yet headlined a UFC event prior to UFC 120, having only competed twice in the United States. His U.S. debut came at UFC 100, in the opening bout on the UFC 100 pay-per-view event against Alan Belcher, where Akiyama won via a disputed split decision (30–27, 28–29, 29–28). Many pundits were vocal in their disagreement with Akiyama winning the bout, with even UFC president Dana White stating "I wasn't 100 percent sure of the decision, you know what I mean, but I think it was a tough fight to score, too". Akiyama's second UFC appearance (and final appearance prior to UFC 120) was the co-main event of UFC 116 against Chris Leben. Unlike the Belcher fight, Akiyama was regarded as the aggressor throughout the bout and was most likely en route to another decision victory. However, with seconds left in the final round, Leben was able to secure a triangle choke submission to force Akiyama to tap-out. Despite the loss, the bout was regarded as highly entertaining and both Leben and Akiyama took away the "Fight of the Night" bonus, worth $75,000. The fight was Akiyama's first loss in over five years and it led to Akiyama moving his training camp to Albuquerque, New Mexico, under the tutelage of Greg Jackson, the World MMA Awards "Trainer of the Year" in 2010 and 2011.

Prior to the main event, both fighters seemed confident due to their new trainers. Akiyama was quoted as saying "I felt like he didn't have enough time to prepare for my opponent [Leben] and so during the fight I wasn't able to come up with a strategy that is specifically for Chris Leben." Akiyama also mentioned "I was able to learn the intricate skills of the takedowns, as well as better striking for MMA. I feel like [I have] a better takedown than Bisping does." Bisping responded by stating: "With respect, I couldn't care less who he trains with. He can train with anyone. What I'm focusing on these days is what I do, focusing on my training. And he can worry about what I'm bringing to the table. My training's going fantastic. I feel in great shape. I've improved all my areas. Regardless of who he's training with, I think I'll be too much for him. Now everything's coming together. Mario Sukata, he's always been my MMA coach. But I've been working with some new striking coaches, strength and conditioning coaches, new boxing coaches, a new wrestling coach."

=== Co-main event ===
The co-main event featured recent UFC Welterweight title challenger Dan Hardy facing off against the former World Extreme Cagefighting welterweight champion Carlos Condit in a fight contested at the UFC welterweight limit of 170 pounds (77.5 kg). Dan Hardy was looking to return to winning ways having been defeated in his title fight back at UFC 111, whereas Condit looked to improve after a difficult start to life in the UFC.

Dan Hardy aimed to recover from a title loss at UFC 111 by taking on former WEC champion, Carlos Condit

Hardy entered the fight with an MMA record of 23 wins, 7 losses with 1 no contest, of which 4 wins and 1 loss came in fights within the UFC. Hardy had joined the UFC in late 2008, after compiling a record of 19–6, predominantly in the English MMA circuit. He quickly made a name for himself defeating MMA veteran Akihiro Gono via split decision at UFC 89 and Rory Markham via KO at UFC 95; both taking place in England. Hardy then began to gain recognition as he openly baited Marcus Davis into a fight at UFC 99 by mocking Davis' Irish heritage by stating: "He's had a couple of fights in the UK, and he's kind of building himself a fan base, but he's not English; he's not Irish. I was born here, and I've been bred here. I don't mind taking on that challenge and showing him this is my home and not his." Hardy went on to defeat Davis and was placed in a title contender fight against Mike Swick at UFC 105, in Manchester, England. After defeating Swick, Hardy faced the champion Georges St-Pierre at UFC 111. This was Hardy's last fight before UFC 120 and he was thoroughly dominated by St-Pierre's wrestling and top control resulting in a loss via unanimous decision (50–43, 50–44, 50–45).

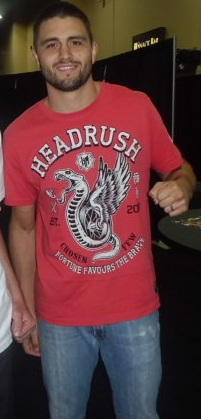
Carlos Condit held a UFC record of 2–1, prior to UFC 120

Condit entered the fight with an MMA record of 25 wins and 5 losses, of which 2 wins and 1 loss were in the UFC. Condit moved to the UFC in April 2009, having been the final World Extreme Cagefighting Welterweight Champion. Condit had arguably struggled since his move to the UFC, however, as he began with a split decision loss to Martin Kampmann at UFC Fight Night 18 and then followed it up with a split decision victory over Jake Ellenberger at UFC Fight Night 19, which was disputed by some pundits and the live crowd in attendance. Condit's final fight before UFC 120 was against the youngster Rory MacDonald. Condit was taken down 3 times in the opening round and largely controlled. Condit came back with a more aggressive attitude in the final round and finished MacDonald with a combination of elbows and punches. After the fight, the judges scorecards were revealed and showed that had MacDonald not been finished in the last seven seconds, then he would have picked up a split decision victory. Though Condit was 2–1 in the UFC, each fight had been close, which was in contrast to Hardy's largely successful start in the promotion.

Pre-fight hype for the co-main event focused on Hardy's well-documented desire to fight someone who could put on an entertaining fight. Hardy was vocal in his criticism of Nik Lentz after Lentz defeated Hardy's teammate, Andre Winner in a fight marred by a perceived lack of action. Before his fight with Condit, Hardy said "Rather than saying "oh, these guys can't wrestle", I think the problem is there's beginning to be too much wrestling in the UFC Octagon, not too little of it in the gym. There are a lot of people out there calling themselves "UFC fighters" who are nothing of the kind. In the UFC, you should go for finishes." The comments drew criticism by fighters and pundits who believed he was referring to his fight against Georges St-Pierre, which Hardy later denied, stating: "People are assuming I'm making these comments because of that fight and I'm not. [St-Pierre] had his submissions attempts, and he played the game the right way. I was under pressure in the fight – there was no point where he was just holding me down. But there are some fighters who think, 'I've got a takedown, I can rest a bit here now.' There just isn't the intention to damage the opponent or submit them." When Hardy was paired up with Condit (ironically a teammate of St-Pierre's), Hardy seemed happy with the match-up, saying "When Joe Silva [the UFC matchmaker] called me up and said 'How about Condit?' I said to myself, 'That's an awesome fight.' I know he's going to come to have a fight, there's no doubt about it, he'll do everything he can to win. That's what I'm interested in."

=== Main card ===
The third main card bout featured English fighter John Hathaway facing MMA veteran Mike Pyle in the welterweight division. Hathaway was coming off an upset victory over The Ultimate Fighter 1 winner, Diego Sanchez Hathaway was regarded as England's top prospect due to his takedown defence being higher than most fighters in the country. Hathaway was also undefeated, holding an MMA record of 14 wins and 0 defeats, with 4 of those wins coming in UFC events. Pyle was an experienced veteran, holding a professional MMA record of 20 wins, 7 losses and 1 draw and a UFC record of 2–2. His most recent fight prior to UFC 120 was a win over Jesse Lennox at UFC 115 via triangle choke submission. Before the fight, Pyle sought to downplay the achievement of Hathaway defeating Diego Sanchez, stating: "Diego's a small, somewhat average-(sized) [155-pound fighter]." Hathaway responded by stating "I definitely think he's [Pyle] a step up. [Pyle is] incredibly experienced and very dangerous. I think he finishes like 80 to 90 percent of his fights by submission, so he's definitely a dangerous opponent."

Also on the main card was a heavyweight (206–265 pounds) fight between French fighter and UFC veteran Cheick Kongo and the relative newcomer Travis Browne. Kongo held an MMA record of 15 wins, 6 losses and 1 draw, with a UFC record of 8–4. Browne, on the other hand was undefeated going into the fight and won in his UFC debut which took place 4 months prior to UFC 120. For Kongo, this bout was a chance for redemption. Kongo had lost two fights in mid/late 2009 and whilst he was victorious in his final bout prior to UFC 120, he had been accused of unsportsmanlike conduct by many fans, after being deducted a point (on the judges' scorecards) against Paul Buentello at UFC Live: Vera vs. Jones. For Browne, it was a chance to build on his successful UFC debut, where he defeated James McSweeney via TKO in the opening round of their bout. Browne held a professional record of 10–0 coming into the fight and of his 10 victories, he had finished the fight in the first round due to KO or TKO in 7 of them.

The opening fight on the main card was a welterweight contest between Claude Patrick and the winner of The Ultimate Fighter: United States vs. United Kingdom, James Wilks. Prior to the fight, Wilks had an MMA record of 7 wins and 3 losses, with 2 wins and a loss coming within the UFC. Patrick, who had an MMA record of 12 wins and 1 loss, was making his second UFC appearance, having won in his debut via guillotine choke just a few months earlier.

=== Injuries and replacements ===
Dan Hardy was originally scheduled to fight Dustin Hazelett at this event before Hazelett pulled out because of his wedding in September. Carlos Condit replaced Hazelett as Dan Hardy's opponent. John Hathaway was also expected to fight the then-undefeated Dong Hyun Kim. However, Kim was forced off the card with an elbow injury sustained during training and was replaced by Mike Pyle.

Tom Blackledge, an assistant coach for Team Rampage on The Ultimate Fighter: Heavyweights was originally set to fight James Te-Huna. However, Te-Huna withdrew after an injury in training. Blackledge was then scheduled to fight TUF 10 semi-finalist, James McSweeney. However, on September 28, 2010, Tom Blackledge withdrew from the matchup with James McSweeney for unknown reasons and was replaced by Fabio Maldonado.

Steve Cantwell was scheduled to fight Stanislav Nedkov, however the fight was cancelled less than 48 hours prior to the event, after Cantwell suffered a knee injury in training.

=== Card criticism ===
UFC 120 had drawn criticism before it had even taken place. The most common theme was that pundits and fans felt that the UFC events held in England were too focused on English fighters, rather than the "big name", world recognised fighters that audiences in the United States were used to. Past UFC events held in England featured title fights, such as UFC 80 (held in Newcastle, England), which had a UFC Lightweight Championship bout; the last time a UFC championship fight took place in England. Other main events held in England featured well known former champions, such as Randy Couture and Mirko "Cro Cop" Filipović, though UFC 120 was perceived to have less star power. The complaints by English fans were slightly exacerbated due to the length of time between when events were held in the country. UFC had only held one event in England in 2010 (UFC 120), which was down from two events in 2009 and three in 2008.

The criticism resulted in members of the UFC – both management and fighters – defending the event. The UK president of the UFC, Marshall Zelaznik stated: "Obviously, championship fights for the most part are elevated to the pay-per-view cards. The pay-per-view cards over here, because of the time change, make it a bit of a challenge in the U.S. to see the impact you're hoping to see from the championship fights." In an effort to appease the dissatisfied fans, he also added: "It's a bit of a business decision, but that's not to say we'll never have a pay-per-view here or we'll never have a championship fight here."

John Hathaway, who was competing on the main card at UFC 120 said: "I think it's a good card. It's great to see so many British fighters fighting international opponents. I'm more than happy with the card, I'm happy to compete, and I'm always keen to put a good performance on for the fans."

Dana White, the UFC president also defended the event, stating: "You cannot say a card sucks until it's over. It's like when we are sitting down and debating over who is going to win a fight. The cards get criticised and those are the events that normally end up being the most exciting, with great fights on them. At the end of the day you are paying to see good fights as a fan. I guarantee the card we are bringing to England will be great."

=== UFC Fan Expo ===
The UFC also held their first international Fan Expo, having held their first expo at UFC 100. It was held at Earls Court Exhibition Centre on October 15 and 16 and it allowed fans to visit over 100 MMA-related vendors and also get autographs from several UFC fighters who attended the expo. Around two dozen fighters were announced for the event to sign autographs and interact with fans, with other fighters, such as Randy Couture and Wanderlei Silva holding their own seminars.

=== Attendance and gate figures ===
Despite the negative reaction to the event and its participants, Marshall Zelaznik announced that UFC 120 was expected to break the European attendance and gate receipts records, having sold out the original seating plan. The gate record prior was 16,693, set by UFC 105, with the record gate receipts coming in at $2.7m at UFC 75. This later proved partially correct, as the event set a new European attendance record of 17,133, but fell just short of the gate receipts figure with $2.56m. With over 17,000 spectators, the event became, at that time, the ninth most attended event in UFC history.

Despite the record attendance, the viewing figures on Spike TV were reduced from the last event to take place in England. UFC 120 averaged 1.9 million viewers, whereas UFC 105, in November 2009 had averaged 2.9 million.

== Results ==
Main Card
Weight class				Method	Round	Time	Notes
Middleweight	Michael Bisping	def.	Yoshihiro Akiyama	Decision (unanimous) (30–27, 30–27, 30–27)	3	5:00
Welterweight	Carlos Condit	def.	Dan Hardy	KO (punch)	1	4:27
Welterweight	Mike Pyle	def.	John Hathaway	Decision (unanimous) (30–27, 30–27, 30–27)	3	5:00
Heavyweight	Cheick Kongo	vs.	Travis Browne	Draw (unanimous) (28–28, 28–28, 28–28)	3	5:00	(Note: Kongo had 1 point deducted in round 3 for repeatedly grabbing Browne's shorts.)
Welterweight	Claude Patrick	def.	James Wilks	Decision (unanimous) (30–27, 30–27, 30–27)	3	5:00
Preliminary card
Weight class				Method	Round	Time	Notes
Light Heavyweight	Alexander Gustafsson	def.	Cyrille Diabaté	Submission (rear-naked choke)	2	2:41
Heavyweight	Rob Broughton	def.	Vinicius Queiroz	Submission (rear-naked choke)	3	1:43
Lightweight	Paul Sass	def.	Mark Holst	Submission (triangle choke)	1	4:45
Lightweight	Spencer Fisher	def.	Curt Warburton	Decision (unanimous) (29–28, 29–28, 29–28)	3	5:00
Light Heavyweight	Fabio Maldonado	def.	James McSweeney	TKO (punches)	3	0:48

== Bonus awards ==
The following fighters received $60,000 bonuses.

- Fight of the Night: Michael Bisping vs. Yoshihiro Akiyama
- Knockout of the Night: Carlos Condit
- Submission of the Night: Paul Sass

== See also ==
- Ultimate Fighting Championship
- List of UFC champions
- List of UFC events
- 2010 in UFC
