= 2009 in UFC =

Mixed martial arts events

Information
- First date: January 17, 2009
- Last date: December 12, 2009

Events
- Total events: 20
- UFC: 15
- UFC Fight Night: 3
- TUF Finale events: 2

Fights
- Total fights: 215
- Title fights: 11

Chronology
2008 in UFC	2009 in UFC	2010 in UFC

The year 2009 was the 17th year in the history of the Ultimate Fighting Championship (UFC), a mixed martial arts promotion based in the United States. In 2009 the UFC held 20 events beginning with, UFC 93: Franklin vs. Henderson.

== 2009 UFC.com awards ==
2009 UFC.COM Awards
No	Best Fighter	The Upsets	The Submissions	The Newcomers	The Knockouts	The Losses	The Fights
1	Georges St-Pierre	Paulo Thiago defeats Josh Koscheck; UFC 95	Terry Etim defeats Justin Buchholz; UFC 99	Paul Daley	Anderson Silva defeats Forrest Griffin; UFC 101	Maurício Rua loses to Lyoto Machida 1 UFC 104	Diego Sanchez defeats Clay Guida; The Ultimate Fighter 9 Finale
2	Lyoto Machida	Mike Pierce defeats Brock Larson; UFC Fight Night: Diaz vs. Guillard	Demian Maia defeats Chael Sonnen; UFC 95	Roy Nelson	Lyoto Machida defeats Rashad Evans; UFC 98	Jon Jones loses to Matt Hamill; The Ultimate Fighter: Heavyweights Finale	Antônio Rogério Nogueira defeats Randy Couture; UFC 102
3	Anderson Silva	Shane Nelson defeats Aaron Riley; UFC 96	Frank Mir defeats Cheick Kongo; UFC 107	Aaron Simpson	Matt Hamill defeats Mark Muñoz; UFC 96	Clay Guida loses to Diego Sanchez; The Ultimate Fighter: United States vs. United Kingdom Finale	Nate Quarry defeats Tim Credeur; UFC Fight Night: Diaz vs. Guillard
4	B.J. Penn	Jon Jones defeats Stephan Bonnar; UFC 94	DaMarques Johnson defeats Edgar García; UFC 107	Stefan Struve	Dan Henderson defeats Michael Bisping; UFC 100	Jake Ellenberger loses to Carlos Condit; UFC Fight Night: Diaz vs. Guillard	Rich Franklin defeats Wanderlei Silva; UFC 199
5	Maurício Rua	TJ Grant defeats Ryo Chonan; UFC 97	Joe Lauzon defeats Jeremy Stephens; UFC Fight Night: Lauzon vs. Stephens	Ross Pearson	Nate Marquardt defeats Demian Maia; UFC 102	Paul Buentello loses to Stefan Struve; UFC 107	Carlos Condit defeats Jake Ellenberger; UFC Fight Night: Diaz vs. Guillard
6	Dan Hardy	Mark Coleman defeats Stephan Bonnar; UFC 100	Rick Story defeats Brian Foster; UFC 103	Johny Hendricks	Paulo Thiago defeats Josh Koscheck; UFC 95	Wanderlei Silva loses to Rich Franklin 1 UFC 99	Yoshihiro Akiyama defeats Alan Belcher; UFC 100
7	Cain Velasquez	Alessio Sakara defeats Thales Leites; UFC 101	Tom Lawlor defeats C. B. Dollaway; UFC 100	John Howard	Maurício Rua defeats Chuck Liddell; UFC 97	Cheick Kongo loses to Cain Velasquez; UFC 99	Rick Story defeats Brian Foster; UFC 103
8	Dan Henderson	Brian Stann defeats Steve Cantwell; UFC Fight Night: Diaz vs. Guillard	Alan Belcher defeats Denis Kang; UFC 93	Paulo Thiago	Nate Marquardt defeats Wilson Gouveia; UFC 96	Maurício Rua loses to Mark Coleman; UFC 93	Tyson Griffin defeats Rafael dos Anjos; UFC Fight Night: Condit vs. Kampmann
9	Nate Marquardt	Kimbo Slice defeats Houston Alexander; TUF 10 Finale	Jon Jones defeats Jake O'Brien; UFC 123	John Hathaway	Shane Carwin defeats Gabriel Gonzaga; UFC 96	Tim Credeur loses to Nate Quarry; UFC Fight Night: Diaz vs. Guillard	Lyoto Machida defeats Maurício Rua; UFC 104
10	Jon Jones	Michael Bisping defeats Denis Kang; UFC 105	Tim Hague defeats Pat Barry; UFC 98	Todd Duffee (Tie); Yoshihiro Akiyama (Tie); Kimbo Slice (Tie)	Todd Duffee defeats Tim Hague; UFC 102	Alan Belcher loses to Yoshihiro Akiyama; UFC 100	Martin Kampmann defeats Carlos Condit; UFC Fight Night: Condit vs. Kampmann
Ref							

== Debut UFC fighters ==
The following fighters fought their first UFC fight in 2009:

ISO	Fighter	Division
(United States)	Aaron Simpson	Middleweight
(Sweden)	Alexander Gustafsson	Light Heavyweight
(Brazil)	Alexandre Barros	Welterweight
(England)	Andre Winner	Lightweight
(Brazil)	Antônio Rogério Nogueira	Light Heavyweight
(United States)	Ben Rothwell	Heavyweight
(United States)	Brendan Schaub	Heavyweight
(United States)	Brian Cobb	Lightweight
(United States)	Brian Foster	Welterweight
(United States)	Brian Stann	Light Heavyweight
(United States)	Cameron Dollar	Lightweight
(United States)	Carlos Condit	Welterweight
(United States)	Chase Gormley	Heavyweight
(United States)	Chris Tuchscherer	Heavyweight
(United States)	DaMarques Johnson	Welterweight
(United States)	Dan Cramer	Middleweight
(Brazil)	Danillo Villefort	Middleweight
(United States)	Darrill Schoonover	Heavyweight
(Canada)	Denis Kang	Middleweight
(Bosnia and Herzegovina)	Denis Stojnic	Heavyweight
(United States)	Derek Downey	Lightweight
(United States)	Drew McFedries	Middleweight
(United States)	Edgar Garcia	Welterweight
(United States)	Evan Dunham	Lightweight
(Brazil)	Fabricio Camões	Lightweight
(United States)	Frank Lester	Welterweight

ISO	Fighter	Division
(Croatia)	Igor Pokrajac	Light Heavyweight
(Italy)	Ivan Serati	Light Heavyweight
(United States)	Jacob Volkmann	Lightweight
(United States)	Jake Ellenberger	Welterweight
(United States)	Jake Rosholt	Middleweight
(England)	James McSweeney	Heavyweight
(England)	James Wilks	Welterweight
(United States)	Jared Hamman	Light Heavyweight
(Brazil)	Jay Silva	Middleweight
(United States)	Jesse Lennox	Welterweight
(United States)	Jesse Sanders	Middleweight
(United States)	Joe Brammer	Lightweight
(England)	John Hathaway	Welterweight
(United States)	John Howard	Welterweight
(United States)	Johny Hendricks	Welterweight
(United States)	Jon Madsen	Heavyweight
(United States)	Justin Wren	Heavyweight
(United States)	Kimbo Slice	Heavyweight
(Finland)	Lucio Linhares	Middleweight
(United States)	Marcus Jones	Heavyweight
(United States)	Mark Muñoz	Middleweight
(United States)	Matt Mitrione	Heavyweight
(United States)	Matt Veach	Lightweight
(United States)	Mike Ciesnolevicz	Light Heavyweight
(United States)	Mike Pierce	Welterweight
(United States)	Mike Pyle	Welterweight

ISO	Fighter	Division
(United States)	Mike Russow	Heavyweight
(England)	Neil Grove	Heavyweight
(United States)	Nick Catone	Middleweight
(England)	Nick Osipczak	Welterweight
(United States)	Nik Lentz	Lightweight
(United States)	Nissen Osterneck	Middleweight
(England)	Paul Daley	Welterweight
(Brazil)	Paulo Thiago	Welterweight
(Germany)	Peter Sobotta	Welterweight
(Brazil)	Rafaello Oliveira	Lightweight
(Brazil)	Ricardo Funch	Welterweight
(United States)	Rick Story	Welterweight
(United States)	Rodney Wallace	Light Heavyweight
(England)	Ross Pearson	Lightweight
(United States)	Roy Nelson	Heavyweight
(United States)	Ryan Madigan	Welterweight
(Netherlands)	Stefan Struve	Heavyweight
(United States)	Steve Lopez	Lightweight
(United States)	Steve Steinbeiss	Middleweight
(Canada)	Tim Hague	Heavyweight
(United States)	Tim McKenzie	Middleweight
(Canada)	TJ Grant	Welterweight
(United States)	Todd Duffee	Heavyweight
(Republic of Ireland)	Tom Egan	Welterweight
(France)	Xavier Foupa-Pokam	Middleweight
(Japan)	Yoshihiro Akiyama	Middleweight

== The Ultimate Fighter ==
Season	Finale	Division	Winner	Runner-up
TUF 9: United States vs. United Kingdom	Jun 20, 2009	Lightweight	Ross Pearson	Andre Winner
TUF 9: United States vs. United Kingdom	Jun 20, 2009	Welterweight	James Wilks	DaMarques Johnson
TUF 10: Heavyweights	Dec 5, 2009	Heavyweight	Roy Nelson	Brendan Schaub

== Title fights ==
Title fights in 2009
Weight class				Method	Round	Time	Event	Notes
Welterweight	Georges St-Pierre (c)	def.	B.J. Penn	TKO (corner stoppage)	4	5:00	UFC 94	(Note: For the UFC Welterweight Championship.)
Middleweight	Anderson Silva (c)	def.	Thales Leites	Decision (unanimous) (49-46, 48-47, 50-46)	5	5:00	UFC 97	(Note: For the UFC Middleweight Championship.)
Light Heavyweight	Lyoto Machida	def.	Rashad Evans (c)	KO (punches)	2	3:57	UFC 98	(Note: For the UFC Light Heavyweight Championship.)
Welterweight	Georges St-Pierre (c)	def.	Thiago Alves	Decision (unanimous) (50–45, 50–44, 50–45)	5	5:00	UFC 100	(Note: For the UFC Welterweight Championship.)
Heavyweight	Brock Lesnar (c)	def.	Frank Mir (ic)	TKO (punches)	2	1:48	UFC 100	(Note: For the UFC Heavyweight Championship.)
Lightweight	B.J. Penn (c)	def	Kenny Florian	Submission (rear-naked choke)	4	3:54	UFC 101	(Note: For the UFC Lightweight Championship.)
Light Heavyweight	Lyoto Machida (c)	def.	Maurício Rua	Decision (unanimous) (48-47, 48-47, 48-47)	5	5:00	UFC 104	(Note: For the UFC Light Heavyweight Championship.)
Lightweight	B.J. Penn (c)	def.	Diego Sanchez	TKO (doctor stoppage)	5	2:37	UFC 107	(Note: For the UFC Lightweight Championship)

== Events list ==
#	Event	Date	Venue	Location	Attendance
142	UFC 107: Penn vs. Sanchez	Dec 12, 2009	FedExForum	Memphis, Tennessee, U.S.	13,896
141	The Ultimate Fighter: Heavyweights Finale	Dec 5, 2009	Palms Casino Resort	Las Vegas, U.S.	1,791
140	UFC 106: Ortiz vs. Griffin 2	Nov 21, 2009	Mandalay Bay Events Center	Las Vegas, U.S.	10,529
139	UFC 105: Couture vs. Vera	Nov 14, 2009	Manchester Evening News Arena	Manchester, England, U.K.	16,693
138	UFC 104: Machida vs. Shogun	Oct 24, 2009	Staples Center	Los Angeles, U.S.	14,892
137	UFC 103: Franklin vs. Belfort	Sep 19, 2009	American Airlines Center	Dallas, U.S.	17,428
136	UFC Fight Night: Diaz vs. Guillard	Sep 16, 2009	Cox Convention Center	Oklahoma City, U.S.	9,490
135	UFC 102: Couture vs. Nogueira	Aug 29, 2009	Rose Garden	Portland, Oregon, U.S.	16,088
134	UFC 101: Declaration	Aug 8, 2009	Wachovia Center	Philadelphia, U.S.	17,411
133	UFC 100	Jul 11, 2009	Mandalay Bay Events Center	Las Vegas, U.S.	10,871
132	The Ultimate Fighter: United States vs. United Kingdom Finale	Jun 20, 2009	Palms Casino Resort	Las Vegas, U.S.	2,217
131	UFC 99: The Comeback	Jun 13, 2009	Lanxess Arena	Cologne, Germany	12,854
130	UFC 98: Evans vs. Machida	May 23, 2009	MGM Grand Garden Arena	Las Vegas, U.S.	12,606
129	UFC 97: Redemption	Apr 18, 2009	Bell Centre	Montreal, Quebec, Canada	21,451
128	UFC Fight Night: Condit vs. Kampmann	Apr 1, 2009	Sommet Center	Nashville, Tennessee, U.S.	10,267
127	UFC 96: Jackson vs. Jardine	Mar 7, 2009	Nationwide Arena	Columbus, Ohio, U.S.	17,033
126	UFC 95: Sanchez vs. Stevenson	Feb 21, 2009	The O_{2} arena	London, England, U.K.	13,268
125	UFC Fight Night: Lauzon vs. Stephens	Feb 7, 2009	USF Sun Dome	Tampa, Florida, U.S.	7,596
124	UFC 94: St-Pierre vs. Penn 2	Jan 31, 2009	MGM Grand Garden Arena	Las Vegas, U.S.	14,885
123	UFC 93: Franklin vs. Henderson	Jan 17, 2009	The O_{2}	Dublin, Ireland	9,369

== See also ==
- UFC
- List of UFC champions
- List of UFC events
