= Dennis Siver =

German martial artist (born 1979)

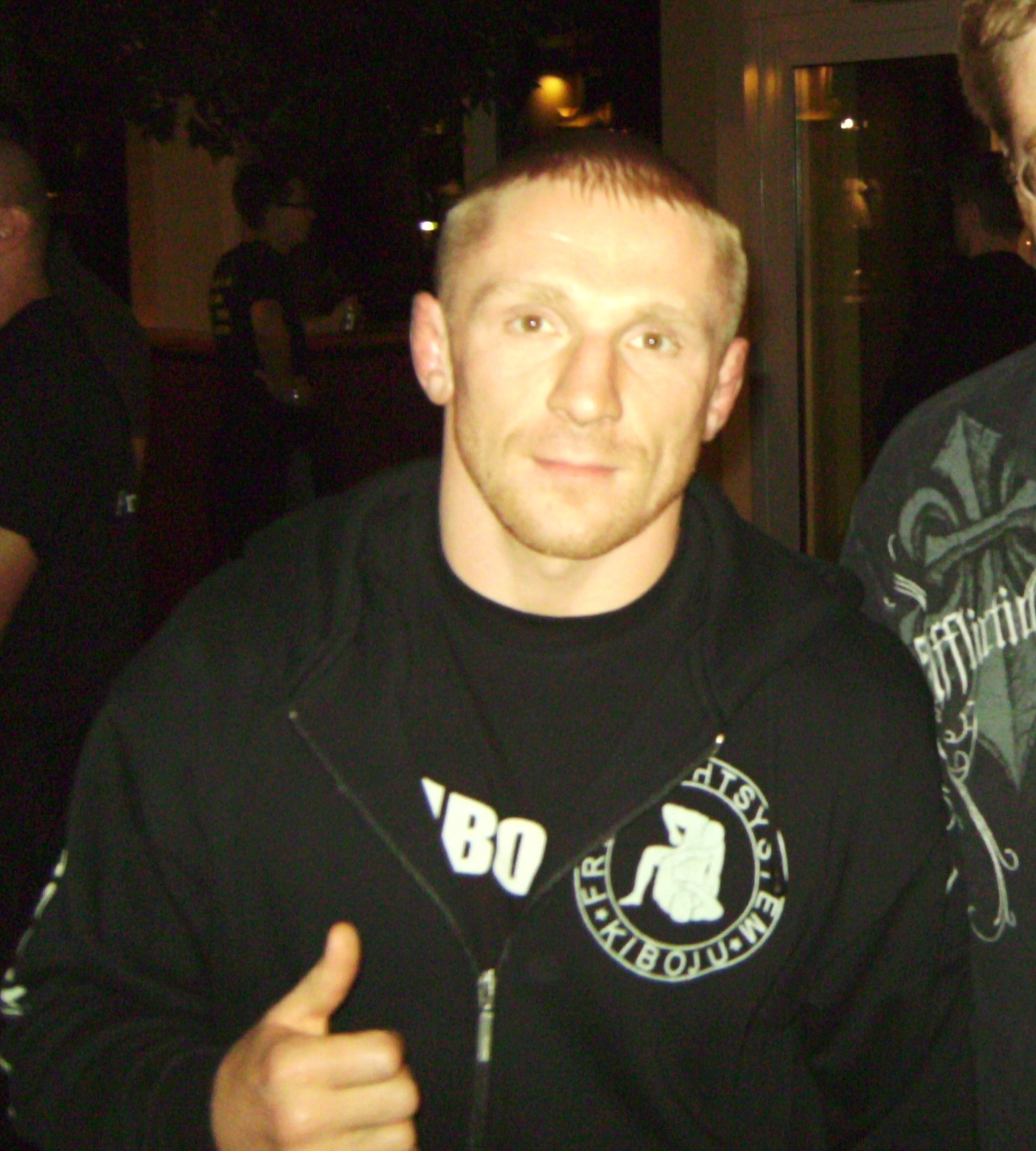
- Siver in 2009
- Born: Dennis D. Siver; January 13, 1979 (age 47); Omsk, Russian SFSR, Soviet Union
- Nationality: German
- Height: 5 ft 7 in (170 cm)
- Weight: 145 lb (66 kg; 10 st 5 lb)
- Division: Featherweight; Lightweight; Welterweight
- Reach: 70 in (178 cm)
- Style: Taekwondo, Kickboxing, Brazilian Jiu-Jitsu, Judo
- Fighting out of: Mannheim, Germany
- Team: Kiboju
- Trainer: Niko Sulenta
- Rank: Black belt in Taekwondo; Purple belt in Brazilian Jiu-Jitsu; Green belt in Judo
- Years active: 2004-2017

Mixed martial arts record
- Total: 35
- Wins: 23
- By knockout: 5
- By submission: 9
- By decision: 9
- Losses: 11
- By knockout: 3
- By submission: 5
- By decision: 3
- No contests: 1

Other information
- Website: http://www.dennis-siver.com.
- Mixed martial arts record from Sherdog

Dennis D. Siver (Russian: Дмитрий Сивер, tr. Dmitriy Siver, born January 13, 1979) is a retired Russian-born German mixed martial artist who competed in the welterweight, lightweight, and featherweight division of the Ultimate Fighting Championship.

Siver is currently teaching martial arts in his hometown, Mannheim.

== Background ==
Siver was born in Omsk, the Soviet Union to a family of Soviet citizens of German descent. Siver began training in Sambo and Judo when he was 15 years old and, at 17, moved to Germany where he continued his training with Taekwondo and Kickboxing. That same year, he became the W.A.K.O Amateur Kickboxing Champion of Germany.

== Mixed martial arts career ==
=== Early career ===
Siver's mixed martial arts career began in small local shows in Russia and England, amongst other European countries. He fought most frequently for Cage Warriors in England, compiling a 3–1 record.

=== Ultimate Fighting Championship ===
After his win against Jim Wallhead at CWFC – Enter The Rough House, Siver was signed by UFC. His debut was against Jess Liaudin at UFC 70 in Manchester, England where he lost via submission (armbar), just 81 seconds into the first round.

Siver was able to bounce back though at UFC 75, again in England. He defeated Naoyuki Kotani via KO (punch) in the second round. This was followed up by a loss to undefeated Gray Maynard at UFC Fight Night 12, via a unanimous decision.

Siver's final match of his first UFC stint was a loss to Melvin Guillard at UFC 86. This fight marked the first knockout loss of Siver's career, which came after just 36 seconds into the first round.

Siver was released by the UFC soon after, having compiled a 1–3 record.

=== Post-UFC ===
Siver had his first post-UFC fight at Tempel: Mix Fight Gala VII against Chas Jacquier. Siver won the fight via submission (guillotine choke) at 4.21 of the first round

=== Return to Ultimate Fighting Championship ===
This win earned Siver a second shot in UFC. He faced off against Nate Mohr at UFC 93 in Dublin, Ireland. In the third round, Siver was able to TKO his opponent via spinning back kick and punches. This victory was also awarded the Knockout of the Night award.

His second fight was against Dale Hartt at UFC 99, which was the first UFC event held in Siver's home country of Germany. Siver won the fight via submission (rear-naked choke) three minutes into the first round.

Siver then fought Paul Kelly at UFC 105 in Manchester, England and, in the same fashion as his victory over Mohr, was able to TKO his opponent via spinning back kick and punches. Once again, the win earned Siver the Knockout of the Night.

Siver fought Ross Pearson on March 31, 2010, at UFC Fight Night 21. Siver lost the fight via unanimous decision (30–27, 30–27, 30–27). However, the fight won Siver a Fight of the Night bonus.

Siver faced Spencer Fisher on June 19, 2010, at The Ultimate Fighter 11 Finale. Siver won the fight via unanimous decision despite suffering a cut from an accidental headbutt in the first round.

Siver defeated Andre Winner via first round arm-trap rear-naked choke after dropping him with a counter punch at UFC 122, earning Submission of the Night honors.

Siver faced George Sotiropoulos on February 27, 2011, at UFC 127. Siver won the bout via unanimous decision, handing Sotiropoulos his first loss in the UFC. Siver showed excellent takedown defense throughout the fight and picked Sotiropoulos apart on the feet, dropping him twice in the first round.

Siver defeated Matt Wiman on July 2, 2011, at UFC 132 in a very close contest, with all three judges scoring the fight 29–28 in Siver's favor. Siver stated at the post-fight press conference that while the decision was close, that he wouldn't go back and score the fight any differently.

Siver was expected to face Sam Stout on October 29, 2011, at UFC 137. However, it was announced on August 29 that Stout had withdrawn from the bout and was replaced by Donald Cerrone. Siver lost by submission in the first round.

Siver was briefly linked to a rematch with Ross Pearson on April 14, 2012, at UFC on Fuel TV: Gustafsson vs. Silva. However, Siver instead faced Diego Nunes at the event, fighting as a featherweight for the first time in 28 career bouts. He won the fight via unanimous decision.

Siver was expected to face Eddie Yagin on September 1, 2012, at UFC 151. However, after UFC 151 was cancelled, Siver/Yagin was rescheduled for December 8, 2012 at UFC on Fox 5. It was then announced that Yagin had been forced out of the bout due to a sparring injury that landed him in the hospital with swelling around his brain, and was replaced by Nam Phan. He won the fight via unanimous decision.

Siver was expected to face Cub Swanson on February 16, 2013, at UFC on Fuel TV: Barao vs. McDonald. However, Siver was forced out of the bout, and was replaced by Dustin Poirier.

The bout with Cub Swanson was rescheduled for July 6, 2013 at UFC 162. After a back and forth first two rounds, Swanson defeated Siver via third-round TKO. The performance earned both participants Fight of the Night honors.

Siver faced Manvel Gamburyan on December 28, 2013, at UFC 168. He won the fight via unanimous decision. However, Siver's initial urine sample came back with inconclusive results, which caused the NSAC to test an alternate sample. On March 15, it was announced that Siver had failed his UFC 168 drug test following the testing of second sample came back positive for hCG. As a result, Siver has been suspended by the NSAC and his win over Gamburyan was changed to "No Contest".

Siver was expected to face Robert Whiteford on October 4, 2014, at UFC Fight Night 53. However, Whiteford pulled out of the bout in mid-September and was replaced by promotional newcomer Taylor Lapilus. There was some controversy over the replacement, and the SMMAF subsequently deemed Lapilus an unsuitable opponent, resulting in American Charles Rosa as the last-minute replacement. Siver won the back-and-forth fight by unanimous decision. The bout also earned Siver his fourth Fight of the Night bonus award.

Siver faced Conor McGregor on January 18, 2015, at UFC Fight Night 59. Siver lost the fight by TKO in the second round.

Siver faced Tatsuya Kawajiri on June 20, 2015, at UFC Fight Night 69. He lost the fight by unanimous decision.

Siver was expected to face returning veteran B.J. Penn on June 4, 2016, at UFC 199. However, Siver was forced out of the bout in early May with an undisclosed injury. The fight with Penn was rescheduled and eventually took place on June 25, 2017, at UFC Fight Night 112. Siver won the fight by majority decision.

=== Absolute Championship Berkut ===
Siver opted not to re-sign with the UFC in November 2017, instead signing with ACB.

Siver was set to make his ACB debut on 25 November 2017 at ACB 75 against Martin van Staden, but withdrew due to a shoulder injury.

== Championships and accomplishments ==
=== Kickboxing ===
- World Association of Kickboxing Organizations
  - W.A.K.O Amateur German Championship (1997)

=== Mixed martial arts ===
- Ultimate Fighting Championship
  - Fight of the Night (Three times)
  - Knockout of the Night (Two times)
  - Submission of the Night (One time)
  - UFC.com Awards
    - 2011: Ranked #3 Upset of the Year vs. George Sotiropoulos (Tied with Rafael dos Anjos)

== Mixed martial arts record ==
Professional record breakdown
| 35 matches | 23 wins | 11 losses |
| By knockout | 5 | 3 |
| By submission | 9 | 5 |
| By decision | 9 | 3 |
| No contests | 1 | |

| Res. | Record | Opponent | Method | Event | Date | Round | Time | Location | Notes |
|---|---|---|---|---|---|---|---|---|---|
| Win | 23–11 (1) | B.J. Penn | Decision (majority) | UFC Fight Night: Chiesa vs. Lee | June 25, 2017 | 3 | 5:00 | Oklahoma City, Oklahoma, United States | |
| Loss | 22–11 (1) | Tatsuya Kawajiri | Decision (unanimous) | UFC Fight Night: Jędrzejczyk vs. Penne | June 20, 2015 | 3 | 5:00 | Berlin, Germany | |
| Loss | 22–10 (1) | Conor McGregor | TKO (punches) | UFC Fight Night: McGregor vs. Siver | January 18, 2015 | 2 | 1:54 | Boston, Massachusetts, United States | |
| Win | 22–9 (1) | Charles Rosa | Decision (unanimous) | UFC Fight Night: Nelson vs. Story | October 4, 2014 | 3 | 5:00 | Stockholm, Sweden | Fight of the Night. |
| NC | 21–9 (1) | Manvel Gamburyan | NC (overturned) | UFC 168 | December 28, 2013 | 3 | 5:00 | Las Vegas, Nevada, United States | Originally a unanimous decision win for Siver; overturned after he tested positive for hCG. |
| Loss | 21–9 | Cub Swanson | TKO (punches) | UFC 162 | July 6, 2013 | 3 | 2:24 | Las Vegas, Nevada, United States | Fight of the Night. |
| Win | 21–8 | Nam Phan | Decision (unanimous) | UFC on Fox: Henderson vs. Diaz | December 8, 2012 | 3 | 5:00 | Seattle, Washington, United States | |
| Win | 20–8 | Diego Nunes | Decision (unanimous) | UFC on Fuel TV: Gustafsson vs. Silva | April 14, 2012 | 3 | 5:00 | Stockholm, Sweden | Featherweight debut. |
| Loss | 19–8 | Donald Cerrone | Submission (rear-naked choke) | UFC 137 | October 29, 2011 | 1 | 2:22 | Las Vegas, Nevada, United States | |
| Win | 19–7 | Matt Wiman | Decision (unanimous) | UFC 132 | July 2, 2011 | 3 | 5:00 | Las Vegas, Nevada, United States | |
| Win | 18–7 | George Sotiropoulos | Decision (unanimous) | UFC 127 | February 27, 2011 | 3 | 5:00 | Sydney, Australia | |
| Win | 17–7 | Andre Winner | Submission (rear-naked choke) | UFC 122 | November 13, 2010 | 1 | 3:37 | Oberhausen, Germany | Submission of the Night. |
| Win | 16–7 | Spencer Fisher | Decision (unanimous) | The Ultimate Fighter: Team Liddell vs. Team Ortiz Finale | June 19, 2010 | 3 | 5:00 | Las Vegas, Nevada, United States | |
| Loss | 15–7 | Ross Pearson | Decision (unanimous) | UFC Fight Night: Florian vs. Gomi | March 31, 2010 | 3 | 5:00 | Charlotte, North Carolina, United States | Fight of the Night. |
| Win | 15–6 | Paul Kelly | TKO (spinning back kick and punches) | UFC 105 | November 14, 2009 | 2 | 2:53 | Manchester, England | Knockout of the Night. |
| Win | 14–6 | Dale Hartt | Submission (rear-naked choke) | UFC 99 | June 13, 2009 | 1 | 3:23 | Cologne, Germany | |
| Win | 13–6 | Nate Mohr | TKO (spinning back kick and punches) | UFC 93 | January 17, 2009 | 3 | 3:27 | Dublin, Ireland | Knockout of the Night. |
| Win | 12–6 | Chas Jacquier | Submission (guillotine choke) | TFS: Mix Fight Gala VII | October 25, 2008 | 1 | 4:21 | Darmstadt, Germany | |
| Loss | 11–6 | Melvin Guillard | KO (punches) | UFC 86 | July 5, 2008 | 1 | 0:36 | Las Vegas, Nevada, United States | |
| Loss | 11–5 | Gray Maynard | Decision (unanimous) | UFC Fight Night: Swick vs. Burkman | January 23, 2008 | 3 | 5:00 | Las Vegas, Nevada, United States | |
| Win | 11–4 | Naoyuki Kotani | KO (punch) | UFC 75 | September 8, 2007 | 2 | 2:04 | London, England | |
| Loss | 10–4 | Jess Liaudin | Submission (armbar) | UFC 70 | April 21, 2007 | 1 | 1:21 | Manchester, England | Welterweight bout. |
| Win | 10–3 | Jim Wallhead | Submission (armbar) | CWFC: Enter The Rough House | December 9, 2006 | 2 | 3:31 | Nottingham, England | |
| Win | 9–3 | Said Khalilov | Decision (split) | WFC 2: Evolution | September 30, 2006 | 3 | 5:00 | Koper, Slovenia | |
| Win | 8–3 | Paul Jenkins | Submission (heel hook) | WFC: Europe vs. Brazil | May 20, 2006 | 2 | 3:42 | Koper, Slovenia | |
| Loss | 7–3 | Daniel Weichel | Submission (rear-naked choke) | TFS: Mix Fight Gala III | May 6, 2006 | 1 | N/A | Darmstadt, Germany | |
| Loss | 7–2 | Arni Isaksson | Submission (armbar) | CWFC: Enter the Wolfslair | March 5, 2006 | 2 | 4:23 | Liverpool, England | |
| Win | 7–1 | Adrian Degorski | Submission (armbar) | CWFC: Enter the Wolfslair | March 5, 2006 | 2 | 1:59 | Liverpool, England | |
| Win | 6–1 | Jonas Eriksson | TKO (punches) | CWFC: Enter the Wolfslair | March 5, 2006 | 1 | 0:35 | Liverpool, England | |
| Loss | 5–1 | Fabricio Nascimento | Submission (kimura) | EVT 5: Phoenix | October 8, 2005 | 1 | 0:47 | Stockholm, Sweden | |
| Win | 5–0 | Maciej Łuczak | Submission (punches) | OC: Masters Fight Night 2 | March 26, 2005 | 2 | N/A | Oberhausen, Germany | |
| Win | 4–0 | Dylan van Kooten | Submission (choke) | BFS: Mix Fight Gala 4 | March 6, 2005 | 1 | N/A | Düsseldorf, Germany | |
| Win | 3–0 | Kenneth Rosfort-Nees | TKO (doctor stoppage) | EVT 4: Gladiators | September 26, 2004 | 1 | 5:00 | Stockholm, Sweden | |
| Win | 2–0 | Mohamed Omar | Decision (unanimous) | Kombat Komplett | August 7, 2004 | 3 | 5:00 | Trier, Germany | |
| Win | 1–0 | Kordian Szukala | Submission (strikes) | Outsider Cup 2 | February 28, 2004 | 1 | 0:17 | Lübbecke, Germany | |

== See also ==
- List of current UFC fighters
- List of male mixed martial artists
