= Team Kaobon =

Mixed martial arts team from Liverpool, England

Coordinates: 53°24′8.7″N 2°56′18″W

- Est.: 2002 (as "Fighters and Fitness")
- Founded by: Colin Heron (founded as "Fighters and Fitness"
- Primary trainers: Colin Heron (Head coach); Marcelo Brigadeiro (Luta Livre coach); Shane Rigby (Wrestling coach); Andy Aspinall (Brazilian Jiu-Jitsu coach); Juddas Clottey (Boxing coach)
- Current titleholders: Mark Adams - BAMMA Featherweight champion Neil Woods - K-1 UK Max champion and various kickboxing/thaiboxing titles Rob Sinclair - BAMMA Lightweight champion Tom Aspinall - UFC Heavyweight champion
- Prominent fighters: Darren Till (UFC); Tom Aspinall (UFC); Terry Etim (UFC); Paul Kelly (UFC); Paul Taylor (UFC); Paul Sass (UFC); Mark Adams (BAMMA Featherweight champion); Martin Stapleton (former Ultimate Fighter participant) Mike Grundy (UFC)
- Training facilities: Liverpool, Chester, London
- Website: Team Kaobon Homepage

Team Kaobon, which was formerly known as Fighters and Fitness is a mixed martial arts team from Liverpool, England. "Team Kaobon" is well known for being the training camp of multiple English lightweight fighters based in the Ultimate Fighting Championship - the top MMA organization - as well as domestically.

== Background ==
Team Kaobon, one of a few MMA gyms based in Liverpool, England (such as the MMA Academy and Next Generation MMA), and was formerly known as "Fighters and Fitness". It has been home to many MMA fighters who have competed domestically in promotions like BAMMA, as well as abroad in the Ultimate Fighting Championship. The gym has undergone changes in recent years, to which founder, Colin Heron, attributed to the growth of the sport of mixed martial arts.

== Notable fighters ==
The following notable fighters have been associated with Team Kaobon

- Terry Etim - UFC
- Paul Kelly - UFC veteran
- Paul Sass - UFC fighter and holder of 7 consecutive triangle choke victories
- Paul Taylor - UFC veteran
- Darren Till - UFC Middleweight
- Tom Aspinall - UFC Heavyweight Champion
- Mike Grundy - Former UFC Featherweight

== See also ==
- List of professional MMA training camps
