= John Hathaway (English wrestler) =

English mixed martial arts fighter

- Born: 1 July 1987 (age 39); Brighton, England
- Other names: The Hitman
- Height: 6 ft 2 in (1.88 m)
- Weight: 170 lb (77 kg; 12 st)
- Division: Welterweight
- Reach: 75 in (190 cm)
- Team: London Shootfighters
- Years active: 2006–2014, 2022–2023

Mixed martial arts record
- Total: 21
- Wins: 18
- By knockout: 5
- By submission: 4
- By decision: 9
- Losses: 3
- By knockout: 1
- By decision: 2

Other information
- Mixed martial arts record from Sherdog

John Hathaway (born 1 July 1987) is an English mixed martial artist and wrestler who competes in the welterweight division. He is one of the most accomplished modern-day catch wrestlers, having won three Snake Pit World Championships and a Snake Pit British Championship.

== Mixed martial arts career ==
=== Background and early career ===
Formerly an open-side flanker for local rugby team Hove RFC, Hathaway decided to make the transition to mixed martial arts after watching the Ultimate Fighting championship on television. He made his professional MMA debut on 25 June 2006, defeating his opponent via rear naked choke in the first round.

John Hathaway currently trains at London Shootfighters. Hathaway also trained in the US with American Top Team and 10th Planet Jiu Jitsu.

=== Ultimate Fighting Championship ===
After signing a four fight deal, Hathaway was scheduled to fight undefeated Tom Egan at UFC 93. He made an impressive UFC debut, scoring a dominant first round TKO win over Egan via elbows.

Hathaway defeated the debuting Rick Story via unanimous decision at UFC 99.

Hathaway's next fight was against Paul Taylor at UFC 105. Hathaway won a unanimous decision (30-27, 30-27, 30-26).

Hathaway then faced the biggest fight of his career as he fought Diego Sanchez on 29 May 2010 at UFC 114, in Sanchez' return to welterweight. In the first round, Hathaway dropped Sanchez with a knee to the head, as Sanchez attempted a takedown. Hathaway then dominated with ground and pound. The rest of the fight saw Hathaway utilize his reach advantage to dominate the striking, which gave him the unanimous decision victory.

Hathaway was expected to face Dong Hyun Kim at UFC 120, but Kim was forced out of the bout with an injury and replaced by Mike Pyle. Hathaway lost to Pyle via unanimous decision after being overmatched by the heavy underdog. This loss was also the first of his career.

Hathaway fought Kris McCray on 26 March 2011 at UFC Fight Night 24. The fight was closely contested throughout. However, Hathaway walked away the winner via split decision.

Hathaway was expected to face Pascal Krauss on 5 November 2011 at UFC 138. However, on 30 August Krauss pulled out of the bout citing a shoulder injury, and was replaced by Matt Brown. On 17 October, Hathaway himself was forced to pull out of the bout due to an undisclosed injury. As a result, Brown was pulled from the card and shifted to UFC 139.

Hathaway/Krauss took place on 5 May 2012 at UFC on Fox 3. He won the fight via unanimous decision.

Hathaway beat John Maguire via unanimous decision on 29 September 2012 at UFC on Fuel TV 5.

Hathaway was expected to face Erick Silva on 8 June 2013 at UFC on Fuel TV 10. However, Hathaway was pulled from the bout in late April and replaced by Jason High.

Hathaway returned from his extended hiatus to face Dong Hyun Kim on 1 March 2014 at The Ultimate Fighter: China Finale. He lost the fight via third round knockout due to a spinning back elbow.

Hathaway was expected to face Gunnar Nelson on 11 July 2015 at UFC 189. However, Hathaway pulled out of the bout on 23 June citing injury, and was replaced by Brandon Thatch.

=== Return from retirement ===
After almost eight years after his last bout, Hathaway made his return on October 15, 2022, at Oktagon 36 against André Ricardo. He won his return, dominating the bout for a unanimous decision victory.

Hathaway faced Łukasz Siwiec on June 17, 2023 at Oktagon 44, losing the bout via unanimous decision.

== Catch wrestling career ==
During his MMA career, Hathaway became known for his wrestling ability. During his time away from MMA, he began competing in catch wrestling. In November 2018, Hathaway competed at Catch Wrestling World Championships hosted by The Snake Pit at the University of Bolton Stadium, winning the light heavyweight (90 kg) championship.

He returned for the 2019 World Championships, winning another championship, this time at middleweight (82 kg). Also at the event, Hathaway competed in a challenge match against Nathaniel Brown, a British medallist in freestyle wrestling, which Hathaway won. He received the Ian Bromley trophy as "best male wrestler of the night."

Due to postponements because of the COVID-19 pandemic, the Snake Pit's next Catch Wrestling World Championships were held in June 2022. Hathaway competed again, winning the middleweight (82 kg) championship and receiving the Jack Carroll award for fastest win (by pin or submission) at the event.

Hathaway competed at the Snake Pit British Championships 2024, winning the light heavyweight (90 kg) championship, followed by the Snake Pit World Championships, where he was the middleweight (82 kg) runner-up.

== Personal life ==
Hathaway was diagnosed with Crohn's disease in 2010. This prevented him from fighting from 2014 to 2022.

== Championships and accomplishments ==
=== Catch wrestling ===
- The Snake Pit
  - Catch Wrestling World Championships
    - 2018 - Champion, light heavyweight (90 kg)
    - 2019 - Champion, middleweight (82 kg)
      - Ian Bromley trophy as "best male wrestler of the night"
    - 2022 - Champion, middleweight (82 kg)
      - Jack Carroll award for fastest win (by pin or submission)
    - 2024 - Runner-up, middleweight (82 kg)
  - Catch Wrestling British Championships
    - 2024 - Champion, light heavyweight (90 kg)

=== Mixed martial arts ===
- Ultimate Fighting Championship
  - UFC.com Awards
    - 2009: Ranked #9 Newcomer of the Year
    - 2010: Ranked #3 Upset of the Year vs. Diego Sanchez

== Mixed martial arts record ==
Professional record breakdown
21 matches	18 wins	3 losses
By knockout	5	1
By submission	4	0
By decision	9	2

Res.	Record	Opponent	Method	Event	Date	Round	Time	Location	Notes
Loss	18–3	Łukasz Siwiec	Decision (unanimous)	Oktagon 44	17 June 2023	3	5:00	Oberhausen, Germany	
Win	18–2	André Ricardo	Decision (unanimous)	Oktagon 36	15 October 2022	3	5:00	Frankfurt, Germany	
Loss	17–2	Dong Hyun Kim	KO (spinning elbow)	The Ultimate Fighter China Finale: Kim vs. Hathaway	1 March 2014	3	1:02	Macau, SAR, China	
Win	17–1	John Maguire	Decision (unanimous)	UFC on Fuel TV: Struve vs. Miocic	29 September 2012	3	5:00	Nottingham, England	
Win	16–1	Pascal Krauss	Decision (unanimous)	UFC on Fox: Diaz vs. Miller	5 May 2012	3	5:00	East Rutherford, New Jersey, United States	
Win	15–1	Kris McCray	Decision (split)	UFC Fight Night: Nogueira vs. Davis	26 March 2011	3	5:00	Seattle, Washington, United States	
Loss	14–1	Mike Pyle	Decision (unanimous)	UFC 120	16 October 2010	3	5:00	London, England	
Win	14–0	Diego Sanchez	Decision (unanimous)	UFC 114	29 May 2010	3	5:00	Las Vegas, Nevada, United States	
Win	13–0	Paul Taylor	Decision (unanimous)	UFC 105	14 November 2009	3	5:00	Manchester, England	
Win	12–0	Rick Story	Decision (unanimous)	UFC 99	13 June 2009	3	5:00	Cologne, Germany	
Win	11–0	Tom Egan	TKO (elbows)	UFC 93	17 January 2009	1	4:36	Dublin, Ireland	
Win	10–0	Jack Mason	Submission (punches)	Cage Rage 28	20 September 2008	1	2:41	London, England	
Win	9–0	Richard Griffin	TKO (punches)	ZT Fight Night 12	30 August 2008	1	2:41	Brighton, England	
Win	8–0	Marvin Arnold Bleau	TKO (punches)	Cage Rage 25	8 March 2008	1	1:32	London, England	
Win	7–0	Tommy Maguire	TKO (punches)	Cage Rage Contenders 7	10 November 2007	2	3:17	London, England	
Win	6–0	Charles Barbosa	Decision (unanimous)	Cage Rage Contenders 6	18 August 2007	3	5:00	London, England	
Win	5–0	Tarcio Santana	Decision (unanimous)	Cage Rage Contenders 5	16 June 2007	3	5:00	London, England	
Win	4–0	Sergei Ussanov	Submission (rear-naked choke)	Cage Rage Contenders 4	3 March 2007	1	2:08	London, England	
Win	3–0	Ludovic Perez	Submission (punches)	ZT Fight Night 4	4 November 2006	1	N/A	London, England	
Win	2–0	Wesley Felix	TKO (punches)	Full Contact Fight Night 3	15 July 2006	2	1:33	Bracknell, England	
Win	1–0	Jim Morris	Submission (rear-naked choke)	ZT Fight Night 2	25 June 2006	1	N/A	Sussex, England	

== See also ==
- List of male mixed martial artists
