= Paul Taylor (fighter) =

English mixed martial artist (born 1979)

- Born: 15 December 1979 (age 46); Walsall, England
- Other names: Relentless
- Height: 6 ft 0 in (1.83 m)
- Weight: 155 lb (70 kg; 11.1 st)
- Division: Lightweight; Welterweight
- Years active: 2002–2011

Mixed martial arts record
- Total: 19
- Wins: 11
- By knockout: 6
- By submission: 2
- By decision: 3
- Losses: 6
- By submission: 2
- By decision: 4
- Draws: 1
- No contests: 1

Other information
- Mixed martial arts record from Sherdog

Paul Taylor (born 15 December 1979) is an English retired professional mixed martial artist who competed in the Lightweight division of the Ultimate Fighting Championship. A professional competitor from 2002 until 2013, Taylor also competed for Cage Rage.

== Mixed martial arts career ==
Taylor fought for Team Kaobon of Liverpool and was a WPKC World Kickboxing Champion. Taylor got into MMA when his coach entered him in the UK's first cage tournament, Cage Rage. Taylor had given up kickboxing after becoming disillusioned at the lack of money in the sport.

After giving up kickboxing, Taylor decided to retrain as a carpenter whilst doing MMA on the side, but eventually trained MMA full-time until his retirement.

=== Ultimate Fighting Championship ===
Taylor sent a DVD of his fighting to the UFC to try and secure a contract with the organization and they signed him immediately.

In his UFC debut, Taylor stopped previously undefeated Edilberto de Oliveira via TKO due to strikes early in the third round.

His second UFC fight at UFC 75 was a loss via armbar to Marcus Davis. Although Taylor lost the fight he came close to winning with the referee seconds away from stopping the action due to Taylor connecting with a high kick and landing several blows on a rocked Davis. Due to its high pace and excitement the fight was awarded Fight of the Night.

His next fight at UFC 80 was a loss via unanimous decision to fellow countryman Paul Kelly. Although he lost, Taylor along with Kelly was awarded $35,000 as a bonus for Fight of the Night. This was the second time that Taylor had won the award.

Taylor fought Jess Liaudin in a rematch at UFC 85. Taylor won by split decision.

Taylor met MMA veteran Chris Lytle at UFC 89 which took place at the National Indoor Arena in Birmingham, England. Lytle won a unanimous decision (29–28, 29–28, 30–27). The decision resulted in loud boos and Taylor was surprised at Lytle being awarded the judges' decision. Sherdog, MMAWeekly and MMAJunkie thought Taylor had won the decision. The fight was awarded Fight of the Night honors and both fighters received $40,000 following their exciting, action packed fight. Although this was Taylor's third defeat in the octagon, he had won Fight of the Night awards on three occasions when he had been defeated in the UFC.

Taylor next fought John Hathaway at UFC 105 in Manchester, England, losing via unanimous decision.

Taylor was expected to make his lightweight debut against John Gunderson on 10 April 2010 at UFC 112. However, due to complications after making the weight cut, Taylor was not medically cleared to fight.

Taylor next faced Sam Stout on 23 October 2010 at UFC 121. The fight saw both fighters attempt kicks. The first round saw Stout bloody Taylor's nose and successfully gain a takedown. Taylor came back in the second, catching Stout on the inside. Stout went on to win a split decision (29–28, 28–29, 30–27).

Taylor next faced Gabe Ruediger on 5 February 2011 at UFC 126. Taylor won via KO after landing a head kick and follow up punches in the second round.

Taylor was expected to face John Makdessi on 14 August 2011 at UFC on Versus 5. However, Makdessi was forced from the bout with an injury and replaced by Donald Cerrone. However it was later revealed that Taylor had broken his foot and was forced out of his scheduled bout and replaced by Charles Oliveira.

Taylor was expected to face Anthony Njokuani on 5 November 2011 at UFC 138. However, just days before the event, Taylor sustained a whiplash injury during a minor traffic collision forcing him from the bout. With no time to find a suitable replacement the bout was scrapped.

Taylor/Njokuani was expected to take place on 11 July 2012 at UFC on Fuel TV: Munoz vs. Weidman. However, Taylor was forced out of the bout with yet another injury, and replaced by Rafael dos Anjos.

Taylor was expected to return from the extended hiatus and the bout with Njokuani scheduled for a third time on 26 October 2013 at UFC Fight Night 30. However, Taylor was forced to pull out of the bout once again with another injury and was replaced this time by Al Iaquinta. After the most recent withdrawal, the UFC announced that Taylor has retired from MMA.

== Championships and accomplishments ==
- Ultimate Fighting Championship
  - Fight of the Night (Three times)
  - UFC.com Awards
    - 2008: Ranked #10 Fight of the Year vs. Paul Kelly

== Mixed martial arts record ==
Professional record breakdown
19 matches	11 wins	6 losses
By knockout	6	0
By submission	2	2
By decision	3	4
Draws	1	
No contests	1	

Res.	Record	Opponent	Method	Event	Date	Round	Time	Location	Notes
Win	11–6–1 (1)	Gabe Ruediger	KO (head kick and punches)	UFC 126	5 February 2011	2	1:42	Las Vegas, Nevada, United States	
Loss	10–6–1 (1)	Sam Stout	Decision (split)	UFC 121	23 October 2010	3	5:00	Anaheim, California, United States	Lightweight debut.
Loss	10–5–1 (1)	John Hathaway	Decision (unanimous)	UFC 105	14 November 2009	3	5:00	Manchester, England	
Win	10–4–1 (1)	Peter Sobotta	Decision (unanimous)	UFC 99	13 June 2009	3	5:00	Cologne, Germany	
Loss	9–4–1 (1)	Chris Lytle	Decision (unanimous)	UFC 89	18 October 2008	3	5:00	Birmingham, England	Fight of the Night
Win	9–3–1 (1)	Jess Liaudin	Decision (split)	UFC 85	7 June 2008	3	5:00	London, England	
Loss	8–3–1 (1)	Paul Kelly	Decision (unanimous)	UFC 80	19 January 2008	3	5:00	Newcastle, England	Fight of the Night.
Loss	8–2–1 (1)	Marcus Davis	Submission (armbar)	UFC 75	8 September 2007	1	4:14	London, England	Fight of the Night
Win	8–1–1 (1)	Edilberto de Oliveira	TKO (strikes)	UFC 70	21 April 2007	3	0:37	Manchester, England	
NC	7–1–1 (1)	Che Mills	No Contest	Cage Rage Contenders 3	12 November 2006	1	N/A	England	Spectator with air horn distracted Taylor, allowing Mills submission victory.
Win	7–1–1	Paul Jenkins	KO (punch)	Road to Tokyo	15 October 2006	1	1:08	England	
Loss	6–1–1	Yuki Sasaki	Submission (armbar)	Pain and Glory 2006	6 May 2006	1	N/A	England	
Win	6–0–1	Jonas Majauskas	TKO (strikes)	Walsall Fight Night	5 March 2006	1	0:53	England	
Win	5–0–1	Zelg Galešic	TKO (punches)	Urban Destruction 1	10 April 2005	3	N/A	England	
Win	4–0–1	Carl Morgan	Submission (kimura)	CFC 3: Cage Carnage	6 March 2005	3	N/A	England	
Win	3–0–1	Daan Kooiman	TKO (strikes)	CFC 2: Cage Carnage	14 November 2004	1	N/A	England	
Win	2–0–1	John Flemming	Submission (guillotine choke)	Pain and Glory 2004	24 April 2004	1	N/A	England	
Win	1–0–1	Jess Liaudin	Decision	Cage Rage 2	22 February 2003	3	5:00	England	
Draw	0–0–1	Matt Ewin	Draw	Cage Rage 1	7 September 2002	N/A	N/A	England	
