= UFC 126 =

UFC mixed martial arts event in 2011

UFC 126: Silva vs. Belfort
- The poster for UFC 126: Silva vs. Belfort
- Promotion: Ultimate Fighting Championship
- Date: February 5, 2011
- Venue: Mandalay Bay Events Center
- City: Las Vegas, Nevada
- Attendance: 10,893
- Total gate: $3,600,000
- Buyrate: 725,000

Event chronology
UFC: Fight for the Troops 2	UFC 126: Silva vs. Belfort	UFC 127: Penn vs. Fitch

UFC 126: Silva vs. Belfort was a mixed martial arts pay-per-view event held by the Ultimate Fighting Championship on February 5, 2011, at the Mandalay Bay Events Center in Las Vegas, Nevada.

== Background ==
Former Light Heavyweight Champion Vitor Belfort was scheduled to fight Yushin Okami at UFC 122. However, UFC President Dana White said that Belfort would instead challenge Middleweight Champion Anderson Silva for the belt. Belfort was originally scheduled to compete against Silva on January 2, 2010, at UFC 108, but due to an injury sustained by Silva, the fight had to be postponed until February 6, 2010, at UFC 109 and April 10, 2010, at UFC 112, respectively. However, both fights were cancelled.

A bout between Kenny Florian and Evan Dunham was expected for this event. The fight was moved to UFC: Fight For The Troops 2.

A bout between Jon Fitch and Jake Ellenberger was expected for this event. However Fitch was pulled from the bout and instead fought former two-division champion B.J. Penn at UFC 127. Ellenberger remained on the card and instead fought Carlos Eduardo Rocha.

Sam Stout was originally scheduled to face Paul Kelly at this event, but dropped off of the card due to injury. Donald Cerrone stepped in to replace him, in what would become the first UFC lightweight fight featuring a fighter imported from the World Extreme Cagefighting following their merger in December 2010.

UFC 126 featured two preliminary fights live on Spike TV, and one preliminary fight on their Facebook stream.

== Results ==
Main card
Weight class				Method	Round	Time	Notes
Middleweight	Anderson Silva (c)	def.	Vitor Belfort	KO (front kick and punches)	1	3:25	(Note: For the UFC Middleweight Championship)
Light Heavyweight	Forrest Griffin	def.	Rich Franklin	Decision (unanimous) (29–28, 29–28, 29–28)	3	5:00
Light Heavyweight	Jon Jones	def.	Ryan Bader	Submission (guillotine choke)	2	4:20
Welterweight	Jake Ellenberger	def.	Carlos Eduardo Rocha	Decision (split) (27–30, 29–28, 29–28)	3	5:00
Bantamweight	Miguel Torres	def.	Antonio Banuelos	Decision (unanimous) (30–27, 30–27, 30–27)	3	5:00
Preliminary card (Spike)
Lightweight	Donald Cerrone	def.	Paul Kelly	Submission (rear-naked choke)	2	3:48
Featherweight	Chad Mendes	def.	Michihiro Omigawa	Decision (unanimous) (30–27, 30–27, 30–27)	3	5:00
Preliminary card (Facebook)
Bantamweight	Demetrious Johnson	def.	Norifumi Yamamoto	Decision (unanimous) (29–28, 30–27, 30–27)	3	5:00
Preliminary card
Lightweight	Paul Taylor	def.	Gabe Ruediger	KO (head kick and punches)	2	1:42
Light Heavyweight	Kyle Kingsbury	def.	Ricardo Romero	TKO (punches)	1	0:21
Welterweight	Mike Pierce	def.	Kenny Robertson	KO (punches)	2	0:29

== Bonus awards ==
The following fighters received $75,000 bonuses.

- Fight of the Night: Donald Cerrone vs. Paul Kelly
- Knockout of the Night: Anderson Silva
- Submission of the Night: Jon Jones

== Reported payout ==
The following is the reported payout to the fighters as reported to the Nevada State Athletic Commission. The numbers only include figures that UFC disclosed to the athletic commission; fight bonuses, sponsorship fees, and other unofficial bonuses were not disclosed.

- Anderson Silva: $200,000 (includes no win bonus) def. Vitor Belfort: $275,000
- Forrest Griffin: $275,000 ($150,000 win bonus) def. Rich Franklin: $75,000
- Jon Jones: $140,000 ($70,000 win bonus) def. Ryan Bader: $20,000
- Jake Ellenberger: $32,000 ($16,000 win bonus) def. Carlos Eduardo Rocha: $8,000
- Miguel Torres: $56,000 ($28,000 win bonus) def. Antonio Banuelos: $9,000
- Donald Cerrone: $36,000 ($18,000 win bonus) def. Paul Kelly: $19,000
- Chad Mendes: $19,000 ($9,500 win bonus) def. Michihiro Omigawa: $8,000
- Demetrious Johnson: $10,000 ($5,000 win bonus) def. Norifumi Yamamoto: $15,000
- Paul Taylor: $36,000 ($18,000 win bonus) def. Gabe Ruediger: $8,000
- Kyle Kingsbury: $20,000 ($10,000 win bonus) def. Ricardo Romero: $10,000
- Mike Pierce: $28,000 ($14,000 win bonus) def. Kenny Robertson: $6,000

== See also ==
- List of UFC events
- List of male mixed martial artists
