= UFC 93 =

UFC mixed martial arts event in 2009

UFC 93: Franklin vs. Henderson
- The poster for UFC 93: Franklin vs. Henderson
- Promotion: Ultimate Fighting Championship
- Date: 17 January 2009
- Venue: The O_{2}
- City: Dublin, Ireland
- Attendance: 9,369
- Total gate: $1,300,000
- Buyrate: 350,000

Event chronology
| UFC 92: The Ultimate 2008 | UFC 93: Franklin vs. Henderson | UFC 94: St. Pierre vs. Penn 2 |

UFC 93: Franklin vs. Henderson was a mixed martial arts event held by the Ultimate Fighting Championship (UFC) on 17 January 2009, at The O_{2}, Dublin in Dublin, Ireland.

== Background ==
The main event featured a Light Heavyweight bout between former UFC Middleweight Champion Rich Franklin and former Pride Middleweight Champion and Pride Welterweight Champion Dan Henderson. The winner of the fight would become the coach opposite Michael Bisping for the ninth season of The Ultimate Fighter: United States vs. United Kingdom.

The co-main event featured a Light Heavyweight rematch between Maurício Rua, the 2005 Pride Middleweight Grand Prix Champion, and the 2000 Pride Open-Weight Grand Prix Champion, UFC Hall of Famer, and former UFC Heavyweight Champion Mark Coleman. This fight was a rematch of their first controversial match at Pride 31 which resulted in a brawl between the camps of both Chute Boxe Academy and Team Hammer House.

== Results ==
Main card (PPV)
| Weight class | | | | Method | Round | Time | Notes |
|---|---|---|---|---|---|---|---|
| Light Heavyweight | Dan Henderson | def. | Rich Franklin | Decision (split) (29–28, 27–30, 29–28) | 3 | 5:00 |
| Light Heavyweight | Maurício Rua | def. | Mark Coleman | TKO (punches) | 3 | 4:36 |
| Middleweight | Rousimar Palhares | def. | Jeremy Horn | Decision (unanimous) (30–27, 30–27, 30–27) | 3 | 5:00 |
| Middleweight | Alan Belcher | def. | Denis Kang | Submission (guillotine choke) | 2 | 4:36 |
| Welterweight | Marcus Davis | def. | Chris Lytle | Decision (split) (29–28, 28–29, 29–28) | 3 | 5:00 |
Preliminary card
| Welterweight | John Hathaway | def. | Tom Egan | TKO (elbows) | 1 | 4:36 |
| Welterweight | Martin Kampmann | def. | Alexandre Barros | TKO (punches) | 2 | 3:09 |
| Light Heavyweight | Eric Schafer | def. | Antonio Mendes | TKO (punches) | 1 | 3:35 |
| Light Heavyweight | Tomasz Drwal | def. | Ivan Serati | KO (punches) | 1 | 2:02 |
| Lightweight | Dennis Siver | def. | Nate Mohr | TKO (spinning back kick and punches) | 3 | 3:47 |

== Bonus awards ==
The following fighters received $40,000 bonuses.

- Fights of the Night: Marcus Davis vs. Chris Lytle and Maurício Rua vs. Mark Coleman
- Knockout of the Night: Dennis Siver
- Submission of the Night: Alan Belcher

== See also ==
- Ultimate Fighting Championship
- List of UFC champions
- List of UFC events
- 2009 in UFC
