= Paul Kelly (fighter) =

English mixed martial artist

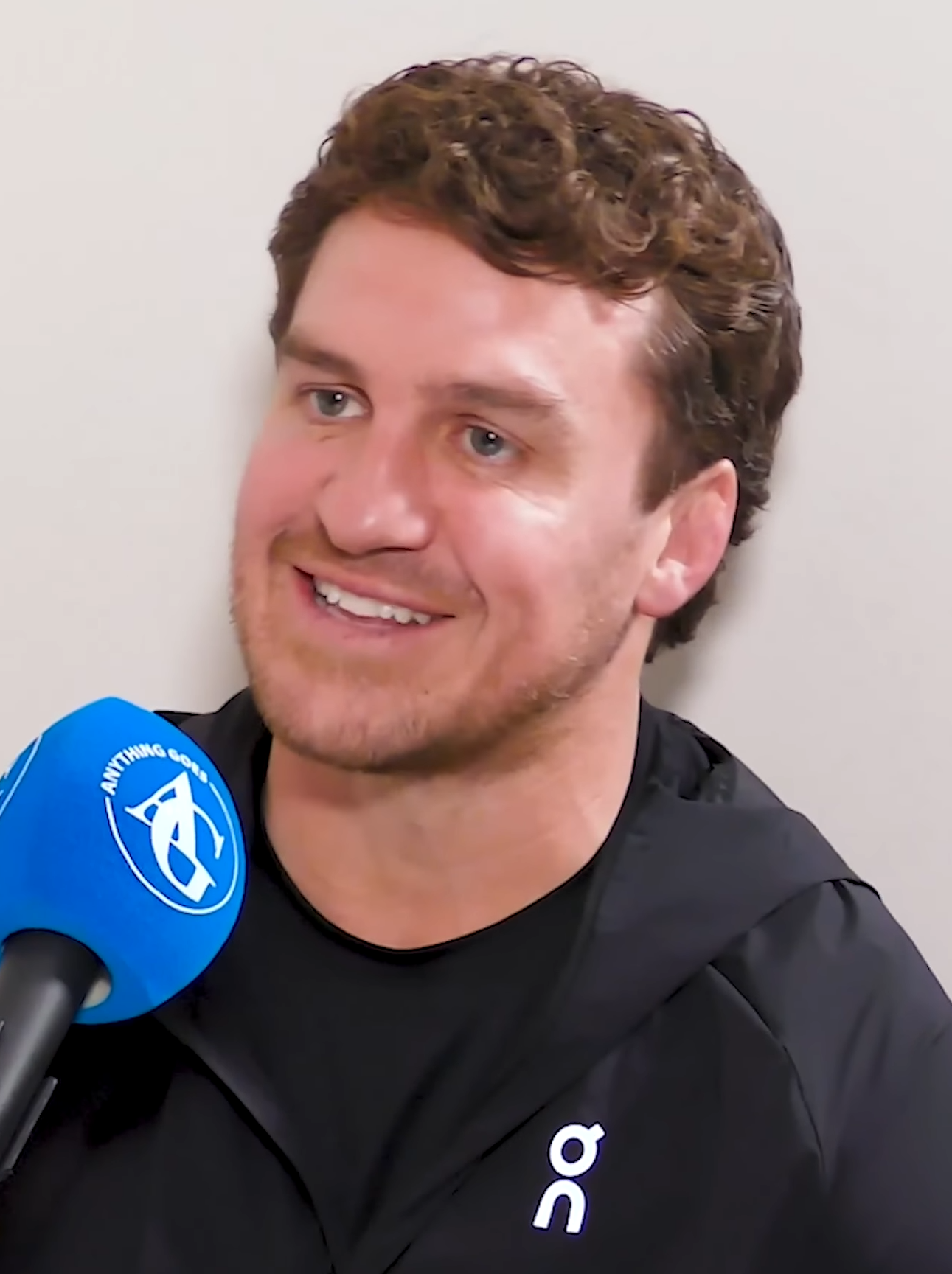
- Kelly in 2025
- Born: Paul Anthony Kelly; 12 September 1984 (age 42); Liverpool, England
- Other names: Tellys
- Height: 5 ft 9 in (1.75 m)
- Weight: 155 lb (70 kg; 11.1 st)
- Division: Lightweight (2009–2012); Welterweight (2006–2009, 2012–present); Middleweight (2005–2006)
- Reach: 70.0 in (178 cm)
- Fighting out of: Liverpool, England
- Team: Wolfslair MMA academy (2004–2010); Team Kaobon (2010–2021)
- Years active: 2005–2013, 2020–2021

Mixed martial arts record
- Total: 20
- Wins: 15
- By knockout: 8
- By submission: 4
- By decision: 3
- Losses: 5
- By knockout: 1
- By submission: 2
- By decision: 2

Other information
- Mixed martial arts record from Sherdog

Paul Anthony Kelly
- Born: 12 September 1984 (age 42); Liverpool, England
- Status: Released in 2019
- Conviction: Heroin trafficking
- Penalty: 13 years in prison

Paul Anthony Kelly (born 12 September 1984) is a retired British mixed martial artist who is best known for his nine-fight stint in the Ultimate Fighting Championship.

Kelly was sentenced to thirteen years in prison for heroin trafficking in 2013. He was released in 2019.

== Mixed martial arts career ==
=== Background ===
Coming from an amateur boxer family, Kelly grew up in boxing gyms and got in a lot of altercations in his youth. He was expelled from school and never completed his education.

Kelly started out his mixed martial arts career in Liverpool, England at the Wolfslair MMA academy which was once home to The Ultimate Fighter 3 winner Michael Bisping. However, he later moved across town to Team Kaobon, home of former UFC lightweight Terry Etim and retired UFC lightweight Paul Taylor.

=== Ultimate Fighting Championship ===
He made his UFC debut at UFC 80: Rapid Fire, where he won a decision victory over his opponent Paul Taylor. Kelly and Taylor were both awarded $35,000 as a bonus for Fight of the Night. The fight was ranked #100 on UFC's Ultimate 100 Greatest Fights.

Kelly was scheduled to fight Jonathan Goulet at UFC 85, but Goulet pulled out citing a lack of preparation. Before another opponent was found, Kelly himself had to withdraw from the event after injuring his right hand during training.

Kelly was defeated by Marcus Davis via submission at UFC 89.

Kelly defeated Troy Mandaloniz at UFC 95. Kelly battered Mandaloniz from top position throughout the fight. He opened cuts above both of Mandaloniz's eyes with elbows and punches. The judges scored the fight (30–27, 30–27, 30–28) for a unanimous decision for Kelly.

After the fight with Mandaloniz, Kelly announced he was moving from welterweight to lightweight. Kelly said he wanted to make the drop after leaving the division on a winning note.

Kelly fought Rolando Delgado at UFC 99 in Cologne, Germany. This was his first fight at lightweight. Kelly defeated Roli after going all three rounds giving Kelly the unanimous decision victory.

Kelly lost his fight against Dennis Siver at UFC 105 after having his ribs injured by a spinning back kick and getting hit by punches from Siver. This was his first fight under Team Kaobon. Kelly revealed afterwards that his ribs had already been damaged going into the fight, a by-product of the notoriously hard-contact sparring sessions at Kaobon.

Kelly then looked to bounce back, against Matt Veach on the UFC 112 card in Abu Dhabi. At 3:41 of the second round, Kelly pulled off a guillotine choke submission and was victorious.

This was then intended to be followed up with a fight against Jacob Volkmann at the UFC 116 prelims, on 3 July. However, the fight was moved on 1 August, to the UFC Live: Jones vs. Matyushenko card due to visa issues forcing him out of the 116 card. Volkmann went on to defeat Kelly via unanimous decision (all judges scoring the bout 30–27).

Kelly was expected to face Gabe Ruediger on 20 November 2010, at UFC 123. However, Ruediger was forced out of the bout with a groin injury. Ruediger was replaced by TUF 12 competitor TJ O'Brien. After initially struggling to hit O'Brien's chin, due to the height disadvantage, Kelly was able to connect and dropped O'Brien with a combination. Later in the second round, Kelly secured a crucifix and hit O'Brien with multiple elbows, resulting in a TKO stoppage.

Kelly was expected to face Sam Stout on 5 February 2011, at UFC 126, but Stout was forced from the bout with an injury and replaced by Donald Cerrone. Kelly lost to Cerrone via submission due to a rear-naked choke. Although he lost, the performance earned him and Cerrone Fight of the Night honors.

In the aftermath of his loss to Cerrone, Kelly was released from the promotion, leaving the company with a 5–4 record.

=== Post UFC ===
Kelly was expected to face Afakasi Sione at UCMMA 21 in England on 25 June. However, due to an injury Kelly had to withdraw from the bout.

Kelly was expected to fight at Legacy FC 9 on 16 December 2011 against Jeff Rexroad. However, Kelly pulled out of the fight due to visa issues and has been replaced by Efraín Escudero, However, Efrain was re-signed to the UFC, causing him to withdraw from the bout.

=== Super Fight League ===
Kelly, along with Xavier Foupa-Pokam and Lena Ovchynnikova signed a four-fight contract with the Super Fight League.

He made his debut for them at SFL 2 against WEC and Strikeforce veteran Ryan Healy. He lost the fight via unanimous decision.

=== UCMMA ===
There has been an ongoing feud between Kelly and Richard Griffin over the last few weeks which has resulted in them being booked to fight at UCMMA 31. They were having a disagreement over a fight that Richard Griffin and Ross Pointon had in the Dominican Republic that was recently posted on the UCMMA Facebook page. Kelly stated that he thought Griffin was lucky in his fight with Pointon and that "The Real Deal" would win that match-up 9 times out of ten. Griffin felt disrespected and fired back with some insults of his own, which including jabs at Kelly being dropped by the UFC. Both men then called for a fight in the cage to settle the matter, in which Dave O’Donnell decided to approach both men to arrange the fight.

Kelly and Griffin settled this feud on 1 December with Kelly winning via guillotine choke in the second round.

=== Post-conviction career ===
Having been active at the gym and studying nutrition during his prison sentence, Kelly returned to the regional mixed martial arts competition at Probellum 1: Liverpool on 7 March 2020. Kelly faced Simone Bottino, winning the bout in the second round via technical knockout.

In February 2021, Kelly announced his retirement from the sport.

== Personal life ==
Kelly had his first child, a daughter named Phoebe in June 2008.

=== Drug trafficking conviction ===
In May 2013, Kelly was found guilty of heroin trafficking in the United Kingdom and was sentenced to 13 years in prison. However, he was put on work release in 2017 and had completed his sentence and thus released in May 2019. During his work release, he started a healthy eating restaurant in Liverpool.

== Championships and accomplishments ==
- Ultimate Fighting Championship
  - Fight of the Night (Two times) vs. Paul Taylor and Donald Cerrone.
  - UFC.com Awards
    - 2008: Ranked #10 Fight of the Year vs. Paul Taylor

== Mixed martial arts record ==
Professional record breakdown
20 matches	15 wins	5 losses
By knockout	8	1
By submission	4	2
By decision	3	2

Res.	Record	Opponent	Method	Event	Date	Round	Time	Location	Notes
Win	15–5	Simone Bottino	TKO (elbows and punches)	Probellum 1: Liverpool	7 March 2020	2	1:37	Liverpool, United Kingdom	
Win	14–5	Henrique Santana	TKO (punches)	UWC 22	2 March 2013	1	3:47	Essex, England, United Kingdom	
Win	13–5	Richard Griffin	Submission (guillotine choke)	UCMMA 31	1 December 2012	2	2:52	London, England, United Kingdom	Welterweight bout.
Loss	12–5	Ryan Healy	Decision (unanimous)	SFL 2	7 April 2012	3	5:00	Chandigarh, India	
Loss	12–4	Donald Cerrone	Submission (rear-naked choke)	UFC 126	5 February 2011	2	3:48	Las Vegas, Nevada, United States	Fight of the Night
Win	12–3	TJ O'Brien	TKO (elbows)	UFC 123	20 November 2010	2	3:16	Auburn Hills, Michigan, United States	
Loss	11–3	Jacob Volkmann	Decision (unanimous)	UFC Live: Jones vs. Matyushenko	1 August 2010	3	5:00	San Diego, California, United States	
Win	11–2	Matt Veach	Submission (guillotine choke)	UFC 112	10 April 2010	2	3:41	Abu Dhabi, United Arab Emirates	
Loss	10–2	Dennis Siver	TKO (spinning back kick and punches)	UFC 105	14 November 2009	2	2:53	Manchester, England	
Win	10–1	Rolando Delgado	Decision (unanimous)	UFC 99	13 June 2009	3	5:00	Cologne, Germany	Debut at Lightweight
Win	9–1	Troy Mandaloniz	Decision (unanimous)	UFC 95	21 February 2009	3	5:00	London, England	
Loss	8–1	Marcus Davis	Submission (guillotine choke)	UFC 89	18 October 2008	2	2:16	Birmingham, England	
Win	8–0	Paul Taylor	Decision (unanimous)	UFC 80	19 January 2008	3	5:00	Newcastle upon Tyne, England	Fight of the Night
Win	7–0	Jordan James	TKO (punches)	Cage Gladiators 4: Prepare for Glory	5 August 2007	2	2:40	Liverpool, England	
Win	6–0	Sami Berik	Submission (rear-naked choke)	Cage Warriors: Enter The Rough House 3	21 July 2007	1	1:27	Nottingham, England	
Win	5–0	Marius Liaukevicius	Submission (arm-triangle choke)	Clash of Warriors	14 July 2007	1	1:10	England	
Win	4–0	Bruce Davis	TKO (doctor stoppage)	House of Pain Fight Night 6: The Real Deal	30 July 2006	1	3:38	Swansea, Wales	Won Middleweight title
Win	3–0	James Neal	TKO (punches)	Ultimate Force	26 November 2006	1	3:02	South Yorkshire, England	
Win	2–0	Nigel Whitear	TKO (punches)	FX3: Battle of Britain	15 October 2005	1	0:54	England	
Win	1–0	Ian McAleese	TKO (punches)	CWFC: Quest 2	29 July 2005	1	1:21	England	
