= Rolando Delgado =

American mixed martial arts fighter

Roli Delgado
- Born: Rolando Delgado; November 22, 1981 (age 44); San Diego, California, U.S.
- Other names: The Crazy Cuban
- Height: 6 ft 3 in (1.91 m)
- Weight: 145 lb (66 kg; 10.4 st)
- Division: Lightweight; Featherweight
- Fighting out of: Little Rock, Arkansas, U.S.
- Team: Westside Fight Team
- Years active: 2002–2012

Mixed martial arts record
- Total: 18
- Wins: 11
- By knockout: 2
- By submission: 6
- By decision: 3
- Losses: 6
- By knockout: 3
- By decision: 3
- Draws: 1

Other information
- Mixed martial arts record from Sherdog

Rolando "Roli" Delgado (born November 22, 1981) is an American mixed martial arts trainer and former mixed martial artist. He fought for the Ultimate Fighting Championship and Bellator Fighting Championships. He was a cast member on The Ultimate Fighter 8.

== Early life ==
Delgado was born on November 22, 1981, in San Diego, California. He moved to Little Rock, Arkansas when he was 15 years old and began training in mixed martial arts (MMA).

== Mixed martial arts career ==
=== Early career ===
Delgado began his career as a cast member UFC's, TUF 8. Although he did not win the show, Delgado submitted castmate John Polakowski via guillotine choke at TUF 8 Finale. He won his debut fight in December 2008. He has competed at Extreme Brawl, Modern Ringsport and Absolute Fighting Championships. He was a cast member of SpikeTV's reality show, The Ultimate Fighter and is a co-owner of Westside MMA in Little Rock.

Delgado was released from his UFC contract following back to back losses to Paul Kelly at UFC 99 and to Andre Winner at UFC 105.

After departing from the UFC, Delgado dropped back down to his original weight class and won twice in Arkansas MMA promotions and later at an undercard fight by unanimous decision.

== Personal life ==
Delgado has a son who was born in 2008. Delgado was a co-host of the ArkanSanity podcast, along with fellow UFC fighter Bryce Mitchell. Following the controversy surrounding the first episode of the podcast, Mitchell announced that Delgado would no longer be a contributor or co-host going forward.

== Mixed martial arts record ==
Professional record breakdown
| 18 matches | 11 wins | 6 losses |
| By knockout | 2 | 3 |
| By submission | 6 | 0 |
| By decision | 3 | 3 |
| Draws | 1 | |

| Res. | Record | Opponent | Method | Event | Date | Round | Time | Location | Notes |
|---|---|---|---|---|---|---|---|---|---|
| Loss | 11–6–1 | Chris Gruetzemacher | TKO (elbows) | ShoFight MMA 20 | June 16, 2012 | 3 | 3:24 | Springfield, Missouri, United States | |
| Win | 11–5–1 | Jameel Massouh | Decision (unanimous) | Bellator 37 | March 19, 2011 | 3 | 5:00 | Concho, Oklahoma, United States | |
| Win | 10–5–1 | Anthony Jones | Decision (unanimous) | Subzero 8: The Ultimate Performing Art | February 19, 2011 | 3 | 5:00 | Little Rock, Arkansas, United States | |
| Win | 9–5–1 | Brandon Shelton | Submission (triangle choke) | C3 Fights: Knockout-Rockout Weekend 3 | June 19, 2010 | 1 | 1:44 | Concho, Oklahoma, United States | |
| Loss | 8–5–1 | Andre Winner | KO (punch) | UFC 105 | November 14, 2009 | 1 | 3:22 | Manchester, England | |
| Loss | 8–4–1 | Paul Kelly | Decision (unanimous) | UFC 99 | June 13, 2009 | 3 | 5:00 | Cologne, Germany | |
| Win | 8–3–1 | John Polakowski | Submission (guillotine choke) | The Ultimate Fighter 8 Finale | December 13, 2008 | 2 | 2:18 | Las Vegas, Nevada, United States | |
| Win | 7–3–1 | Brandon Jinnies | Submission (armbar) | NLE: Last Man Standing 2 | March 23, 2007 | 1 | 2:38 | Louisiana, United States | |
| Win | 6–3–1 | Josh Pearson | Submission (armbar) | NLE: Last Man Standing 2 | March 23, 2007 | 2 | 0:46 | Louisiana, United States | |
| Draw | 5–3–1 | David Love | Draw | Absolute Fighting Championships 18 | August 26, 2006 | 2 | 5:00 | Boca Raton, Florida, United States | |
| Win | 5–3 | Jarrett Becks | TKO (retirement) | Modern Ringsport II | February 18, 2006 | 1 | 5:00 | Little Rock, Arkansas, United States | |
| Win | 4–3 | Aaron Williams | Decision (split) | Modern Ringsport I | July 23, 2005 | 3 | 5:00 | Little Rock, Arkansas, United States | |
| Loss | 3–3 | Jorge Masvidal | TKO (punches) | Absolute Fighting Championships 5 | September 5, 2003 | 2 | 2:14 | Fort Lauderdale, Florida, United States | |
| Loss | 3–2 | Jason Ireland | Decision (unanimous) | Dangerzone: Dakota Destruction | April 12, 2003 | 3 | 5:00 | New Town, North Dakota, United States | |
| Loss | 3–1 | Joe Jordan | Decision (unanimous) | Shooto Americas: Tennessee Shoot-Conquest | January 17, 2003 | 2 | 5:00 | Clarksville, Tennessee, United States | |
| Win | 3–0 | Neil McLeod | Submission (triangle choke) | Extreme Brawl 1 | December 15, 2002 | 1 | N/A | Bracknell, England | |
| Win | 2–0 | Nick Roscorla | Submission (triangle choke) | Ultimate Reality Combat 1 | August 21, 2002 | 1 | 3:55 | United States | |
| Win | 1–0 | Cleve Tuttle | KO (flying knee) | Ultimate Reality Combat 1 | August 21, 2002 | 1 | 0:12 | United States | |
