= James Wilks =

English mixed martial arts fighter

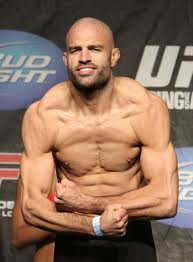
- James Wilks in 2011
- Born: James Brett Wilks; 5 April 1978 (age 48); Leicestershire, England
- Other names: Lightning
- Nationality: English
- Height: 6 ft 1 in (1.85 m)
- Weight: 170 lb (77 kg; 12 st)
- Division: Welterweight
- Reach: 75 in (190 cm)
- Team: Lightning MMA
- Rank: Black belt in taekwondo Brown belt in Brazilian jiu-jitsu Instructor in Jeet Kune Do; Instructor in CSW
- Years active: 2003–2012

Mixed martial arts record
- Total: 11
- Wins: 7
- By knockout: 2
- By submission: 4
- By decision: 1
- Losses: 4
- By knockout: 1
- By submission: 1
- By decision: 2

Other information
- Mixed martial arts record from Sherdog
- Last updated on: 17 October 2010

James Brett Wilks (born 5 April 1978) is an English former professional mixed martial artist. As a professional competitor from 2003 until 2012, he competed for the UFC, King of the Cage, and was the winner of Spike TV's The Ultimate Fighter: United States vs. United Kingdom

== Biography ==
Wilks was born and raised in Leicestershire, England. He attended Uppingham School. After leaving Uppingham in 1996, Wilks went to Bournemouth University, obtaining a Bachelor of Science degree in Business and Land Management.

== Mixed martial arts career ==
Wilks began training taekwondo and Jeet Kune Do while living in the United Kingdom. Wilks is a black belt in taekwondo, brown belt in Brazilian jiu-jitsu, and an instructor of Jeet Kune Do and Combat Submission Wrestling.

He had his first professional fight against The Ultimate Fighter 5 competitor, Roman Mitichyan. Wilks won the fight via armbar submission in the second round. He came back to have his second fight and lost to Jimmy Smith. Before going to tape The Ultimate Fighter 9, Wilks won the Gladiator Challenge welterweight title.

=== The Ultimate Fighter ===
He defeated the highly regarded Che Mills by submission in an elimination match earning him a trip to Las Vegas, Nevada to compete on the show. Wilks had his second fight against Team United States fighter Frank Lester; Wilks won by submission in the second round. In the semi-finals, Wilks faced Lester for a second straight time, after Lester returned to the tournament to defeat David Faulkner while substituting for Jason Pierce, who was removed from the competition by Dana White. In the rematch, Wilks defeated Lester by TKO via knees in the third round, earning a spot in the live finale.

=== Ultimate Fighting Championship ===
Wilks made his debut for the UFC winning against DaMarques Johnson at The Ultimate Fighter: United States vs. United Kingdom Finale on 20 June 2009. The fight crowned Wilks as the TUF 9 welterweight champion. Wilks dominated the fight against Johnson showing off strong striking and good submission attempts. Wilks finished the fight with Johnson via a rear naked choke submission in the closing seconds of the first round.

Wilks lost to Matt Brown via 3rd-round TKO, on 14 November 2009 at UFC 105. After being knocked down in the second and being saved by the bell from a submission attempt, Wilks came back early in the third round, attempting a kimura, before losing top position. Brown then secured the TKO victory. Prior to UFC 115, Wilks revealed that Brown had broken his orbital bone with an elbow strike after just 30 seconds of the first round.

Wilks then faced Peter Sobotta at UFC 115. He won the fight via unanimous decision.

Wilks next fought Canadian prospect Claude Patrick at UFC 120 in London. He lost the fight via unanimous decision.

Wilks was expected to face Rory MacDonald on 30 April 2011 at UFC 129. However, Wilks was replaced on the card by Nate Diaz.

Wilks was expected to replace Duane Ludwig, and face Amir Sadollah at UFC Fight Night 24. However, Wilks was also injured and was replaced by DaMarques Johnson.

=== Retirement ===
After suffering extensive injuries which included a fractured vertebra and after doctors told him he faced "significantly high risk of paralysis" if he continued to fight, Wilks announced his retirement from active MMA competition on 14 May 2012.

== Personal life ==
Wilks is an advocate of plant-based eating. Wilks is also a military (special forces) combatives instructor and law enforcement defensive tactics instructor.

== The Game Changers ==
Wilks had a leading role in the documentary film The Game Changers (2018), advocating a primarily plant-based diet in high-performance sport and produced by James Cameron.

== Championships and accomplishments ==
=== Brazilian jiu-jitsu ===
- Gracie US Nationals
  - Gracie US Nationals 2008 Gold Medalist (Advanced Division, 185lbs)

=== Mixed martial arts ===
- Ultimate Fighting Championship
  - The Ultimate Fighter Season 9 Winner
- Gladiator Challenge
  - GC Welterweight Championship (One time)

== Mixed martial arts record ==
Professional record breakdown
11 matches	7 wins	4 losses
By knockout	2	1
By submission	4	1
By decision	1	2

Res.	Record	Opponent	Method	Event	Date	Round	Time	Location	Notes
Loss	7–4	Claude Patrick	Decision (unanimous)	UFC 120	16 October 2010	3	5:00	London, England	
Win	7–3	Peter Sobotta	Decision (unanimous)	UFC 115	12 June 2010	3	5:00	Vancouver, British Columbia, Canada	
Loss	6–3	Matt Brown	TKO (punches)	UFC 105	14 November 2009	3	2:26	Manchester, England	
Win	6–2	DaMarques Johnson	Submission (rear naked choke)	The Ultimate Fighter: United States vs. United Kingdom Finale	20 June 2009	1	4:54	Las Vegas, Nevada, United States	Won the TUF 9 Welterweight Tournament.
Win	5–2	Mike Robles	Submission (armbar)	GC 85: Cross Fire	25 October 2008	2	4:27	San Diego, California, United States	
Win	4–2	John Cole	TKO (knees)	Apocalypse Fights 1: The First Sign	7 August 2008	1	0:26	Coachella, California, United States	
Win	3–2	Shawn Nagano	Submission (rear naked choke)	UAGF 4: Kaos on the Kampus	20 May 2006	2	4:22	Los Angeles, California, United States	
Loss	2–2	Patrick Speight	Decision (unanimous)	Total Combat 13: Anarchy	11 March 2006	3	3:00	Del Mar, California, United States	
Win	2–1	Ray Lizama	TKO (cut)	KOTC 41: Relentless	24 September 2004	1	1:14	San Jacinto, California, United States	
Loss	1–1	Jimmy Smith	Submission (kneebar)	KOTC 39: Hitmaster	6 August 2004	1	1:40	San Jacinto, California, United States	
Win	1–0	Roman Mitichyan	Submission (armbar)	UAGF Ultimate Cage Fighting 4	12 October 2003	2		Upland, California, United States	

=== Mixed martial arts exhibition record ===
Exhibition record breakdown		
3 matches	3 wins	0 losses
By knockout	1	0
By submission	2	0

Res.	Record	Opponent	Method	Event	Date	Round	Time	Location	Notes
Win	3–0	Frank Lester	TKO (knees)	The Ultimate Fighter: United States vs. United Kingdom		3		Las Vegas, Nevada, United States	Semi-finals
Win	2–0	Frank Lester	Submission (armbar)	The Ultimate Fighter: United States vs. United Kingdom		2	3:06	Las Vegas, Nevada, United States	Quarter-finals
Win	1–0	Che Mills	Submission (heel hook)	The Ultimate Fighter: United States vs. United Kingdom		1	0:30	Cheshire, England, United Kingdom	Elimination bout

== See also ==
- List of male mixed martial artists
