= Marcus Davis =

American mixed martial arts fighter

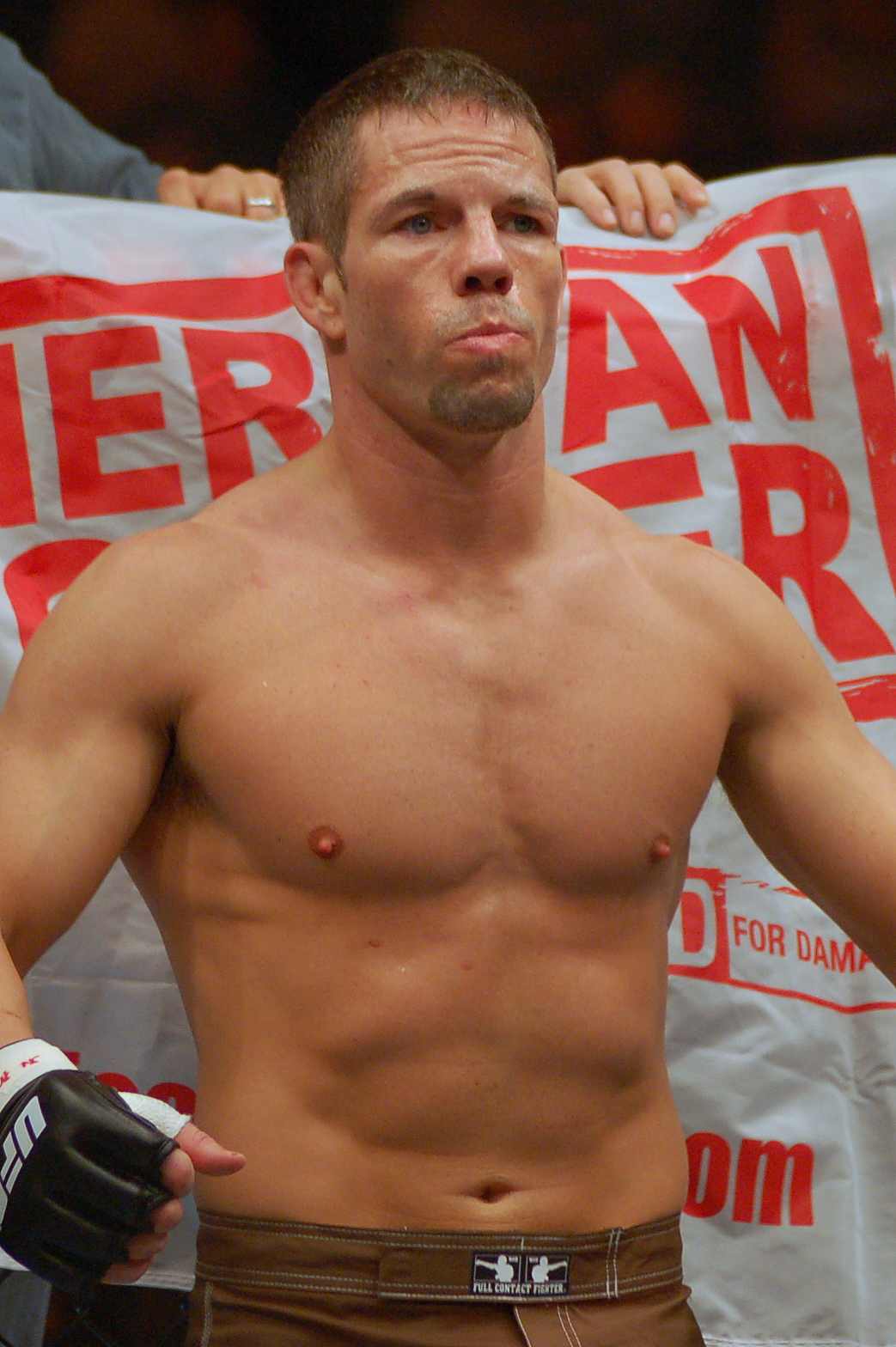
- Born: August 24, 1973 (age 53); Houlton, Maine, U.S.
- Other names: The Irish Hand Grenade
- Height: 5 ft 8 in (1.73 m)
- Weight: 170 lb (77 kg; 12 st)
- Division: Middleweight; Welterweight; Lightweight
- Reach: 70 in (178 cm)
- Stance: Southpaw
- Fighting out of: Bangor, Maine, U.S.
- Team: Team Sityodtong
- Rank: Black belt in Choi Shin Do Karate
- Years active: 2003–2014, 2021 (MMA); 1993–2000 (boxing)

Professional boxing record
- Total: 20
- Wins: 17
- By knockout: 12
- Losses: 1
- By knockout: 1
- Draws: 2

Kickboxing record
- Total: 2
- Losses: 2
- By knockout: 2

Mixed martial arts record
- Total: 35
- Wins: 23
- By knockout: 6
- By submission: 10
- By decision: 7
- Losses: 11
- By knockout: 4
- By submission: 3
- By decision: 4
- No contests: 1

Other information
- Boxing record from BoxRec
- Mixed martial arts record from Sherdog

Marcus Davis (born August 24, 1973), is an American former professional mixed martial artist and former professional boxer who is perhaps best known for competing in the UFC. A professional MMA competitor from 2003 until 2021, Davis also competed for Bellator MMA, the MFC, the Cage Fury Fighting Championships, and was a contestant on The Ultimate Fighter 2.

== Background ==
Davis was born in Houlton, Maine, and raised in Bangor, Maine, by his single mother along with his brother, Ron who is six years older than Marcus. Davis was troubled growing up, often getting into fights. He was also stabbed twice, shot at on more than one occasion, and witnessed rapes at a young age. He began karate when he was eight years old because there were no boxing gyms in his town, though he would eventually start boxing when he was 14 years old, having his first amateur match later that year. Davis attended Bangor High School and became a professional boxer when he was 18 years old. At 19, Davis began his career with a second round TKO of Luis Guzman in April 1993 and compiled a professional record of 17–1–2 over the next seven years on the New England circuit, where he fought primarily as a Junior-Middleweight. In his last fight as a boxer, he suffered a TKO loss to 34-year-old Ed Bryant which led him to reconsider his future as a successful boxer. He then became excited with the challenge of mixed martial arts, much to the bemusement of his peers. He retired from boxing after the TKO loss in October 2000. In 1995, Davis, then based in Massachusetts, began training in grappling with Joe Maffei. In 1997, he moved back to Bangor and opened up an MMA school, while running a bar. The doormen took classes at the school, one of whom was Tim Sylvia. After Sylvia joined Miletich Fighting Systems in 2000, Davis quickly followed. More recently, Davis has trained with Mark Dellagrotte and his own team in Bangor, Team Sityodtong.

== Mixed martial arts career ==
=== Early career ===
Davis entered professional MMA on August 22, 2003, with a first-round TKO of Shaun Gay. Though later describing himself as "one-dimensional", Davis was able to put together a 3–2 professional record.

=== Ultimate Fighting Championship ===
In 2005, Marcus was a contestant on The Ultimate Fighter 2. Coming in with reputed boxing skills, he picked Joe Stevenson in episode four in what proved to be a mismatch as Davis was quickly taken down by the eventual winner and submitted. He was later brought back in episode ten to cover for Jason Von Flue, who suffered a cut on his forehead in practice, though Von Flue's cut was healed enough in time to fight. Marcus fought on the undercard of the finale, where he lost to Melvin Guillard.

Following the series, Davis strongly considered retirement but recuperated from a shoulder injury picked up against Joe Stevenson and went back to MMA training. Davis subsequently bounced back with 11 wins, including a triumphant return to the UFC at Ortiz vs. Shamrock 3: The Final Chapter.

In Davis' fight against Paul Taylor at UFC 75 in London, England he was knocked down by a high kick to the neck, but was able to recover, gain a dominant position, and secure an armbar as Taylor desperately scrambled to regain control. Marcus won Fight of the night as well as submission of the night for that fight. For earning the submission and fight of the night awards, he was awarded $80,000 in bonuses. His next fight was a highlight-reel knockout win against fierce rival Jess Liaudin at UFC 80 in Newcastle, England.

Marcus Davis lost a very one sided unanimous decision to Mike Swick at UFC 85, ending his six fight undefeated streak in the octagon and eleven fight winning streak in MMA. He got back to winning ways with a submission victory over England's Paul Kelly at UFC 89.

Davis' fought Chris Lytle at UFC 93 on January 17, 2009. Both fighters are former boxers and had discussed a potential fight in their futures since early 2008. Lytle called out Davis at UFC 89. He suggested that the fight take place in Ireland, where Davis had gained a substantial following due to his emphasis on his Irish roots. Leading up to the event, both fighters promised to stand and trade blows for the entire fight, rather than engage in grappling. Lytle managed to stun Davis several times, but Davis used superior footwork, counter-punching, and kicks to win a split decision. The bout shared Fight of the Night honors with the Coleman/Rua co-main event, earning Davis a $40,000 bonus.

Davis fought on June 13, 2009, against up and coming striker Dan Hardy. The fight became personal when Hardy took offense to Davis defeating British-based fighters in Britain. Hardy called Davis a "fake Irishman" as well as a "Plastic Paddy" and said his website "looked like a St. Patrick's day parade had blown up". Hardy posted photos of Davis on Cagewarriors.com which resulted in many being edited in "humorous" fashions by forum users. Some of these edits included homosexual imagery which touched a nerve with Davis and increased the ill-feeling between the two. Hardy won the fight via a narrow and controversial split decision. After the fight, Davis expressed his anger at the decision, stating, "I won the fight. I won 12 minutes of the fight and they gave it to him? You bet I want a rematch, right away."

Davis suffered his first knock out loss by Ben Saunders due to knee on November 21, 2009, at UFC 106. This knockout loss resulting in Davis receiving a medical suspension of up to six months because of a broken nose.

Davis fought Jonathan Goulet at UFC 113. He won via TKO due to punches in the second round.

Davis lost to Nate Diaz on August 28, 2010, at UFC 118 via technical submission (guillotine choke) in the third round.

In an interview with MMA Junkie.com Davis confirmed he would drop to the Lightweight division for his next UFC appearance and said he made the decision after the realization that his frame is better suited for 155 pounds. Davis also confirmed that he was contemplating retirement stating "I'm going to finish out my career at 155 and try to entertain some people along the way before my old ass retires," Davis also stated "That's where I'm normally and naturally going to be, so that's where I'm going to fight right now," he said of the 155-pound lightweight division. "It does make more sense that I should be able to compete better at that weight for the fact that the weight difference isn't going to be so dramatic."

Davis fought Jeremy Stephens on January 1, 2011, at UFC 125. After a back and forth fight which saw Davis getting an edge on the judges' scorecards, he was knocked out by a counter right hook at 2:33 of the third round.

On January 6, 2011 it was announced that Davis had been released by the UFC after losing four out of his last five bouts.

=== Maximum Fighting Championship ===
It was announced that Davis signed a contract with the Maximum Fighting Championship company, and had signed on to fight Curtis Demarce at MFC 29. He won the fight via split decision. Davis returned at MFC 30, defeating Pete Spratt by unanimous decision in a rematch of their bout from UFC 69.

=== Independent promotions ===
Davis was scheduled to face Josh Hersey on September 23 at Global Fight League 13: Heavy Hitters in Portland, Maine, but Hersey pulled out of the bout due to a knee injury and was replaced by Travis Coyle. Davis defeated Coyle via submission in the first round. Davis fought Ultimate Fighter 13 alumnus Chuck O'Neil in a Welterweight bout at W-1 Reloaded in Miami, Florida, on October 15. The bout was to be the co-main event but was later promoted to the main event after Jeff Monson pulled out of his fight with Gabriel Gonzaga. Davis lost by split decision.

Davis was scheduled to fight Matt Lee at Century Fighting Championship: Davis vs. Lee on March 31, 2012 in Salem, New Hampshire. However the event was postponed.

On May 6, 2012, Davis turned his hand to kickboxing to challenge Mark Casserly for the ISKA World Light Cruiserweight (-84.6 kg/186.5 lb) Oriental Championship in Dublin, Ireland, losing by head-kick knockout in round one.

Davis replaced Karo Parisyan and faced David Bielkheden at Superior Challenge 8 on October 6, 2012, in Malmo, Sweden. He won by unanimous decision.

Davis fought against Darrius Heyliger on May 18, 2013 at NEF 7. Davis defeated Heyliger via unanimous decision.

Following his loss to Alexander Sarnavskiy, Davis faced Ryan Sanders at NEF: Fight Night 12 on February 8, 2014. In a shocking upset, Davis lost the fight via doctor stoppage TKO.

=== Bellator MMA ===
Davis made his Bellator debut on March 21, 2013, at Bellator 93 against Waachiim Spiritwolf. The bout ended in a no contest when Davis hit Spiritwolf with an inadvertent knee to the groin in the first round and he could not continue.

Davis faced Alexander Sarnavskiy on September 27, 2013, at Bellator 101 in the Quarterfinals of Bellator's Season Nine Lightweight Tournament. He lost via rear-naked choke submission in the first round.

A comment was made via Marcus Davis' YouTube account that he would be retiring in 2014.

=== Return to competition ===
On July 21, 2020, news surfaced that Davis is expected to face Nick Alley at Premier FC 31 on October 3, 2020. The bout was later cancelled and Davis was rebooked against Stephen Stengel on November 19, 2021 at Premier FC 32. He won the fight via first-round submission.

== Other media ==
Davis appeared on Total Nonstop Action Wrestling's weekly television program Impact! and at the Lockdown pay-per-view event in April 2008 as Samoa Joe's personal trainer for his TNA World Heavyweight Championship match against Kurt Angle. He also presented the winner of the match with the TNA Championship. In November 2010, Davis received a Legislative Sentiment sponsored by State Representative Chris Greeley of Maine, for his success as a fighter and for the recognition and attention he's brought to both the state of Maine, and the sport of mixed martial arts as a whole. (Greeley started training with Davis and Team Irish in January 2011.) Davis also co-hosts a weekly radio program, Pull No Punches Radio, every Friday night. He appeared on Season 2 of Doomsday Preppers as an MMA instructor.

== Personal life ==
Davis has been married three times. He has four children. Davis' family comes from Waterford, Ireland. Aside from fighting and boxing, Davis has managed bars, night clubs, and used to work as a bouncer.

== Championships and accomplishments ==
=== Mixed martial arts ===
- Ultimate Fighting Championship
  - Knockout of the Night (One time) vs. Jason Tan
  - Submission of the Night (One time) vs. Paul Taylor
  - Fight of the Night (Three times) vs. Paul Taylor, Chris Lytle and Nate Diaz
  - UFC.com Awards
    - 2007: Ranked #10 Fighter of the Year (Tied with Kenny Florian) & Ranked #4 Submission of the Year vs. Paul Taylor

== Professional boxing record ==
20 fights	17 wins	1 loss
By knockout	12	1
By decision	5	0
Draws	2	

No.	Result	Record	Opponent	Method	Round, time	Date	Location	Notes
20	Loss	17–1–2	(United States) Ed Bryant	TKO	4 (6), 2:39	Oct 13, 2000	(United States) Foxwoods Resort Casino, Mashantucket, Connecticut	
19	Win	17–0–2	(United States) Genaro Andujar	TKO	1	June 2, 2000	(United States) The Roxy, Boston, Massachusetts	
18	Win	16–0–2	(United States) Tommy Attardo	SD	6	April 28, 2000	(United States) Foxwoods Resort Casino, Mashantucket, Connecticut	
17	Win	15–0–2	(United States) Richard Zola	TKO	2	April 1, 2000	(United States) The Roxy, Boston, Massachusetts	
16	Win	14–0–2	(United States) Randy McGee	KO	1 (6)	Mar 17, 2000	(United States) Roseland Ballroom, Taunton, Massachusetts	
15	Win	13–0–2	(United States) Hollister Elliott	UD	8	July 31, 1999	(United States) Roseland Ballroom, Taunton, Massachusetts	
14	Win	12–0–2	(United States) Tommy Attardo	UD	6	May 21, 1999	(United States) Foxwoods Resort Casino, Mashantucket, Connecticut	
13	Win	11–0–2	(United States) Alexander Loubriel	PTS	4	Mar 17, 1999	(United States) The Roxy, Boston, Massachusetts	
12	Win	10–0–2	(United States) John Webster	KO	2 (6)	Mar 28, 1997	(United States) The Roxy, Boston, Massachusetts	
11	Draw	9–0–2	(United States) Lyndon Walker	TD	4	Sep 22, 1995	(United States) Central Maine Civic Center, Lewiston, Maine	
10	Win	9–0–1	(United States) Nelson Echevarria	KO	1	May 24, 1995	(United States) The Roxy, Boston, Massachusetts	
9	Win	8–0–1	(United States) Alex Ortiz	TKO	2	Mar 14, 1995	(United States) The Roxy, Boston, Massachusetts	
8	Win	7–0–1	(United States) Andy Winstead	TKO	3	Feb 25, 1995	(United States) Boston, Massachusetts	
7	Win	6–0–1	(United States) Joe LaRoux	KO	2	Dec 14, 1994	(United States) Boston Garden, Boston, Massachusetts	
6	Win	5–0–1	(United States) Chris McClellan	TKO	1	Sep 17, 1994	(United States) Revere, Massachusetts	
5	Draw	4–0–1	(United States) Joe LaRoux	TD	1	Aug 11, 1994	(United States) Malden, Massachusetts	
4	Win	4–0	(United States) Vernon McGriff	UD	6	Jun 21, 1994	(United States) The Roxy, Boston, Massachusetts	
3	Win	3–0	(United States) Ali Whitehead	TKO	1	Sep 10, 1993	(United States) Central Maine Civic Center, Lewiston, Maine	
2	Win	2–0	(United States) Jose Rodriguez	KO	1 (4)	June 26, 1993	(United States) Bangor Auditorium, Bangor, Maine	
1	Win	1–0	(United States) Luiz Guzman	TKO	2 (4)	April 23, 1993	(United States) Bangor Auditorium, Bangor, Maine	Professional debut

== Kickboxing record ==
Kickboxing record
0 wins (0 KOs), 2 losses, 0 draws
Date	Result	Opponent	Event	Location	Method	Round	Time	Record
2012-05-06	Loss	(Republic of Ireland) Mark Casserly	Primal Fighting Championships 4: Worlds Collide	Dublin, Ireland	KO (right high kick)	1	2:08	0-2
For the ISKA World Light Cruiserweight (-84.6 kg/186.5 lb) Oriental Championship.
2005-02-12	Loss	(United States) Carlos Condit	Ring of Fire 15: Inferno	Castle Rock, Colorado	TKO	2	1:03	0-1
Legend: Win Loss Draw/No contest Notes

== Mixed martial arts record ==
Professional record breakdown
35 matches	23 wins	11 losses
By knockout	6	4
By submission	10	3
By decision	7	4
No contests	1	

Res.	Record	Opponent	Method	Event	Date	Round	Time	Location	Notes
Win	23–11 (1)	Stephen Stengel	Submission (triangle choke)	Premier FC 32	November 19, 2021	1	N/A	Springfield, Massachusetts, United States	
Loss	22–11 (1)	Ryan Sanders	TKO (doctor stoppage)	NEF: Fight Night 12	February 8, 2014	1	5:00	Lewiston, Maine, United States	Return to Welterweight.
Loss	22–10 (1)	Alexander Sarnavskiy	Submission (rear-naked choke)	Bellator 101	September 27, 2013	1	1:40	Portland, Oregon, United States	Bellator Season Nine Lightweight Tournament Quarterfinal.
Win	22–9 (1)	Darrius Heyliger	Decision (unanimous)	NEF: Fight Night 7	May 18, 2013	3	5:00	Lewiston, Maine, United States	
NC	21–9 (1)	Waachiim Spiritwolf	NC (knee to the groin)	Bellator 93	March 21, 2013	1	3:05	Lewiston, Maine, United States	
Win	21–9	David Bielkheden	Decision (unanimous)	Superior Challenge 8	October 6, 2012	3	5:00	Malmö, Sweden	
Loss	20–9	Chuck O'Neil	Decision (split)	W-1: Reloaded	October 15, 2011	3	5:00	Miami, Florida, United States	
Win	20–8	Travis Coyle	Submission (guillotine choke)	Global Fight League 13	September 23, 2011	1	1:07	Portland, Maine, United States	
Win	19–8	Pete Spratt	Decision (unanimous)	MFC 30: Up Close & Personal	June 10, 2011	3	5:00	Edmonton, Alberta, Canada	Return to Welterweight.
Win	18–8	Curtis Demarce	Decision (split)	MFC 29: Conquer	April 8, 2011	3	5:00	Windsor, Ontario, Canada	Lightweight bout.
Loss	17–8	Jeremy Stephens	KO (punch)	UFC 125	January 1, 2011	3	2:33	Las Vegas, Nevada, United States	Lightweight bout.
Loss	17–7	Nate Diaz	Technical Submission (guillotine choke)	UFC 118	August 28, 2010	3	4:02	Boston, Massachusetts, United States	Fight of the Night.
Win	17–6	Jonathan Goulet	TKO (punches)	UFC 113	May 8, 2010	2	1:23	Montreal, Quebec, Canada	
Loss	16–6	Ben Saunders	KO (knees)	UFC 106	November 21, 2009	1	3:24	Las Vegas, Nevada, United States	
Loss	16–5	Dan Hardy	Decision (split)	UFC 99	June 13, 2009	3	5:00	Cologne, Germany	
Win	16–4	Chris Lytle	Decision (split)	UFC 93	January 17, 2009	3	5:00	Dublin, Republic of Ireland	Fight of the Night.
Win	15–4	Paul Kelly	Submission (guillotine choke)	UFC 89	October 18, 2008	2	2:16	Birmingham, England	
Loss	14–4	Mike Swick	Decision (unanimous)	UFC 85	June 7, 2008	3	5:00	London, England	
Win	14–3	Jess Liaudin	KO (punch)	UFC 80	January 19, 2008	1	1:04	Newcastle upon Tyne, England	
Win	13–3	Paul Taylor	Submission (armbar)	UFC 75	September 8, 2007	1	4:14	London, England	Fight of the Night. Submission of the Night.
Win	12–3	Jason Tan	KO (punch)	UFC 72	June 16, 2007	1	1:15	Belfast, Northern Ireland	Knockout of the Night.
Win	11–3	Pete Spratt	Submission (achilles lock)	UFC 69	April 7, 2007	2	2:57	Houston, Texas, United States	
Win	10–3	Shonie Carter	Decision (unanimous)	UFC Fight Night: Sanchez vs. Riggs	December 13, 2006	3	5:00	San Diego, California, United States	
Win	9–3	Forrest Petz	Submission (guillotine choke)	Ortiz vs. Shamrock 3: The Final Chapter	October 10, 2006	1	4:58	Hollywood, Florida, United States	
Win	8–3	Mike Vaughn	Submission (armbar)	Wild Bill's: Fight Night 4	September 8, 2006	1	4:14	Georgia, United States	
Win	7–3	Jason Hathaway	TKO (punches)	Wild Bill's: Fight Night 3	July 14, 2006	1	1:19	Atlanta, Georgia, United States	
Win	6–3	Doug Gordon	Decision (unanimous)	CFFC 1	June 30, 2006	3	5:00	Atlantic City, New Jersey, United States	
Win	5–3	Craig Gunder	Submission (guillotine choke)	CZ 16	May 13, 2006	1	0:37	Portsmouth, New Hampshire, United States	
Win	4–3	Andy Normington	Submission (neck crank)	CZ 14	April 8, 2006	1	1:41	Manchester, New Hampshire, United States	
Loss	3–3	Melvin Guillard	TKO (doctor stoppage)	The Ultimate Fighter 2 Finale	November 5, 2005	2	2:55	Las Vegas, Nevada, United States	Return to Welterweight; doctor stoppage due to cut.
Win	3–2	Renat Myzabekov	Technical Submission (armbar)	CZ 10	April 2, 2005	1	1:19	Revere, Massachusetts, United States	Lightweight debut; won vacant CZ Lightweight Championship.
Win	2–2	Shaun Gay	TKO (punches)	CZ 7	July 10, 2004	1	1:33	Revere, Massachusetts, United States	
Loss	1–2	Nuri Shakir	Submission (rear-naked choke)	MMA: Eruption	April 30, 2004	3	2:38	Lowell, Massachusetts, United States	Welterweight debut; for Eruption Welterweight Championship.
Loss	1–1	Thiago Alves	Decision (split)	HFC 2	October 18, 2003	3	5:00	Revere, Massachusetts, United States	
Win	1–0	Shaun Gay	TKO (punches)	ISCF: Friday Night Fights	August 22, 2003	1	2:09	Atlanta, Georgia, United States	

== See also ==
- List of Bellator MMA alumni
- List of mixed martial artists with professional boxing records
