= UFC 80 =

UFC mixed martial arts event in 2008

UFC 80: Rapid Fire
- The poster for UFC 80: Rapid Fire
- Promotion: Ultimate Fighting Championship
- Date: January 19, 2008
- Venue: Metro Radio Arena
- City: Newcastle, United Kingdom
- Attendance: 8,412
- Total gate: $1,250,000
- Buyrate: 225,000

Event chronology
UFC 79: Nemesis	UFC 80: Rapid Fire	UFC Fight Night: Swick vs. Burkman

UFC 80: Rapid Fire was a mixed martial arts (MMA) event held by the Ultimate Fighting Championship (UFC), that took place on January 19, 2008, at the Metro Radio Arena in Newcastle, United Kingdom.

== Background ==
The main event was originally scheduled as an interim lightweight championship fight; however, then-lightweight champion Sean Sherk was stripped of his title after the California State Athletic Commission upheld his suspension for testing positive for the anabolic steroid Nandrolone. With the lightweight championship vacated, the Penn vs. Stevenson bout was altered to be for the undisputed lightweight championship.

== Results ==
Main card (PPV)
Weight class				Method	Round	Time	Notes
Lightweight	B.J. Penn	def.	Joe Stevenson	Submission (rear-naked choke)	2	4:02	(Note: For the vacant UFC Lightweight Championship. Penn became the second fighter in UFC history to win the belt in two weight classes.)
Heavyweight	Fabrício Werdum	def.	Gabriel Gonzaga	TKO (punches)	2	4:34
Welterweight	Marcus Davis	def.	Jess Liaudin	KO (punch)	1	1:04
Light Heavyweight	Wilson Gouveia	def.	Jason Lambert	KO (punch)	2	0:37
Middleweight	Jorge Rivera	def.	Kendall Grove	TKO (punches)	1	1:20
Preliminary card
Lightweight	Sam Stout	def.	Per Eklund	Decision (unanimous) (29–27, 30–27, 30–27)	3	5:00
Light Heavyweight	Alessio Sakara	def.	James Lee	TKO (punches)	1	1:30	(Note: This bout aired last on the PPV broadcast following the Hardonk vs. Robinson fight.)
Welterweight	Paul Kelly	def.	Paul Taylor	Decision (unanimous) (30–27, 30–27, 30–27)	3	5:00	(Note: This bout aired on the PPV broadcast following the Davis vs. Liaudin fight.)
Heavyweight	Antoni Hardonk	def.	Colin Robinson	TKO (punches and leg kicks)	1	0:17	(Note: This bout aired on the PPV broadcast following the Penn vs. Stevenson fight.)

== Bonus awards ==
The following fighters received $35,000 bonuses.

- Fight of the Night: Paul Taylor vs. Paul Kelly
- Knockout of the Night: Wilson Gouveia
- Submission of the Night: B.J. Penn

== See also ==
- Ultimate Fighting Championship
- List of UFC champions
- List of UFC events
- 2008 in UFC
