= Peter Sobotta =

Polish-born German mixed martial arts fighter (born 1987)

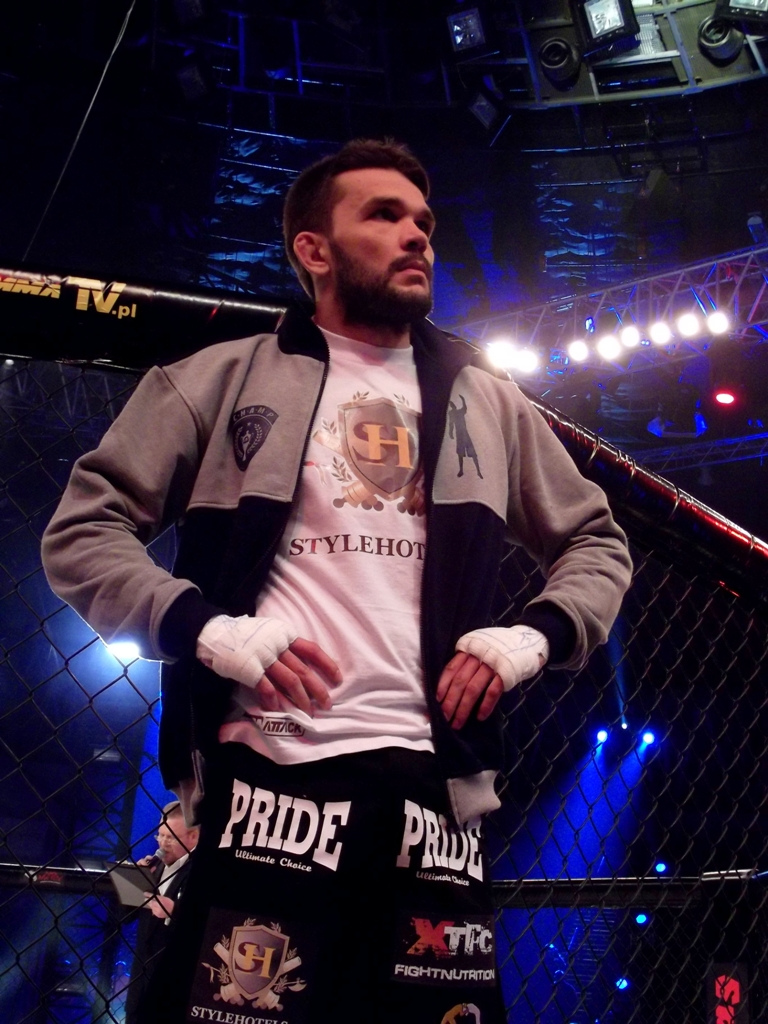
- Peter Sobotta in 2018
- Born: January 11, 1987 (age 39); Zabrze, Poland
- Nationality: Polish; German
- Height: 6 ft 0 in (1.83 m)
- Weight: 170 lb (77 kg; 12 st)
- Division: Welterweight
- Reach: 75 in (191 cm)
- Style: Muay Thai Brazilian Jiu-Jitsu Tae Kwon Do Judo Kung Fu
- Fighting out of: Balingen, Germany
- Team: Planet Eater
- Trainer: Dean Lister
- Rank: Black belt in Brazilian Jiu-Jitsu under Dean Lister
- Years active: 2004–2020

Mixed martial arts record
- Total: 25
- Wins: 17
- By knockout: 5
- By submission: 10
- By decision: 2
- Losses: 7
- By knockout: 2
- By submission: 1
- By decision: 4
- Draws: 1

Other information
- Spouse: Lisa Sobotta (m. 2017)
- Children: 2
- Website: petersobotta.com
- Mixed martial arts record from Sherdog

Peter Sobotta (born January 11, 1987) is a retired Polish-born German professional mixed martial artist. Sobotta fought in the Welterweight division of the Ultimate Fighting Championship (UFC). A professional competitor since 2004, Sobotta has also formerly competed for KSW.

== Background ==
Sobotta was born in Zabrze, Poland, on January 11, 1987, and grew up in the small German town of Balingen. His childhood hero was Jackie Chan, who inspired him to take up martial arts, beginning with judo and then Kung Fu and Tae Kwon Do. He then took up Muay Thai and Brazilian jiu-jitsu when an MMA school opened near his home town.

== Mixed martial arts career ==
=== Early career ===
Sobotta had his first professional mixed martial arts fight at the age of 17, and he compiled a record of 8–1, competing for several regional promotions across Europe, before being signed by the UFC in 2009.

=== Ultimate Fighting Championship ===
Sobotta made his promotional debut on June 13, 2009, at UFC 99 against Paul Taylor. After three rounds, Sobotta lost the fight via unanimous decision.

Sobotta was expected to have his second UFC fight against DaMarques Johnson on November 14, 2009, at UFC 105, but, due to a military commitment for Sobotta, the fight was canceled.

Instead, Sobotta fought James Wilks on June 12, 2010, at UFC 115, losing by unanimous decision (30–27, 30–28, 30–27).

Sobotta then faced The Ultimate Fighter 7 winner, Amir Sadollah on November 13, 2010, at UFC 122. Sobotta lost the fight via unanimous decision. Sobotta was promptly released from the UFC, along with Goran Reljic and Seth Petruzelli.

After three years on the independent circuit, going 5-0-1 in the process, Sobotta was re-signed by the UFC.

Sobotta faced promotional newcomer Pawel Pawlak at UFC Fight Night 41 on May 31, 2014. Sobotta defeated Pawlak by unanimous decision to earn his first UFC victory.

Sobotta was expected to face Sérgio Moraes on April 11, 2015, at UFC Fight Night 64. However, Sobotta was forced out of the bout, citing an injury, and he was replaced by Gasan Umalatov.

The fight with Moraes was rescheduled for June 20, 2015 at UFC Fight Night 69. However, on June 9, the fight was scrapped once again, as Moraes pulled out, for unknown reasons. He was replaced by promotional newcomer Steve Kennedy. Sobotta won the fight via submission in the first round.

Sobotta faced Kyle Noke on November 15, 2015, at UFC 193. Sobotta lost the fight via TKO in the first round, after being dropped with a body kick, followed by punches on the ground.

Sobotta was expected to face Dominic Waters on May 8, 2016, at UFC Fight Night 87. However, Sobotta pulled out of the fight in late March, citing an injury, and he was replaced by Leon Edwards.

Sobotta next faced Nicolas Dalby on September 3, 2016, at UFC Fight Night 93. Before the bout, Sobotta announced he would henceforth represent Jamaica in the UFC, rather than continue to choose between Poland and Germany and offend the other. Sobotta won the fight by unanimous decision.

Sobotta faced Ben Saunders on May 28, 2017, at UFC Fight Night 109. He won the fight via TKO in the second round.

Sobotta faced Leon Edwards on March 17, 2018, at UFC Fight Night 127. Sobotta lost the fight via TKO in the third round.

Sobotta was expected to face Alessio Di Chirico in a middleweight bout on September 28, 2019, at UFC on ESPN+ 18. However, Sobotta was forced out of the bout, due to an undisclosed injury, and he was replaced by promotional newcomer Makhmud Muradov.

Sobotta faced Alex Oliveira on July 26, 2020, at UFC on ESPN 14. Sobotta lost the fight via unanimous decision. Following the last fight of his contract, Sobotta announced his retirement.

== Personal life ==
Sobotta was born in Poland, but raised in Germany. He chose to wear the Jamaican flag at his weigh-in for UFC Fight Night 109, despite the fact that he has dual citizenship to both Poland and Germany. He explained on the UFC Fight Night 109 post fight press conference that the reason he chose to wear the Jamaica flag was to send the "One Love" message to the world.

On December 9, 2017, Sobotta married his wife Lisa Sobotta and they have two sons.

== Mixed martial arts record ==
Professional record breakdown
25 matches	17 wins	7 losses
By knockout	5	2
By submission	10	1
By decision	2	4
Draws	1	

Res.	Record	Opponent	Method	Event	Date	Round	Time	Location	Notes
Loss	17–7–1	Alex Oliveira	Decision (unanimous)	UFC on ESPN: Whittaker vs. Till	July 26, 2020	3	5:00	Abu Dhabi, United Arab Emirates	
Loss	17–6–1	Leon Edwards	TKO (punches)	UFC Fight Night: Werdum vs. Volkov	March 17, 2018	3	4:59	London, England	
Win	17–5–1	Ben Saunders	TKO (punches and knee)	UFC Fight Night: Gustafsson vs. Teixeira	May 28, 2017	2	2:29	Stockholm, Sweden	
Win	16–5–1	Nicolas Dalby	Decision (unanimous)	UFC Fight Night: Arlovski vs. Barnett	September 3, 2016	3	5:00	Hamburg, Germany	
Loss	15–5–1	Kyle Noke	TKO (body kick and punches)	UFC 193	November 15, 2015	1	2:01	Melbourne, Australia	
Win	15–4–1	Steve Kennedy	Submission (rear-naked choke)	UFC Fight Night: Jędrzejczyk vs. Penne	June 20, 2015	1	2:57	Berlin, Germany	
Win	14–4–1	Pawel Pawlak	Decision (unanimous)	UFC Fight Night: Munoz vs. Mousasi	May 31, 2014	3	5:00	Berlin, Germany	
Win	13–4–1	Tamirlan Dadaev	Submission (rear-naked choke)	R2F: Casino Fight Night 3	November 10, 2012	1	2:10	Erfurt, Germany	
Win	12–4–1	Mustafa Asmaoui	Submission (rear-naked choke)	R2F: Casino Fight Night 3	November 10, 2012	1	3:36	Erfurt, Germany	
Win	11–4–1	Branimir Radosavljevic	Submission (rear-naked choke)	R2F: Casino Fight Night 3	November 10, 2012	1	0:35	Erfurt, Germany	
Win	10–4–1	Juan Manuel Suárez	Submission (rear-naked choke)	MMA Attack 2	April 27, 2012	1	2:18	Katowice, Poland	
Win	9–4–1	Marius Panin	Submission (rear-naked choke)	Eurogames MMA Sports	March 24, 2012	1	1:20	Iași, Romania	
Draw	8–4–1	Borys Mańkowski	Draw (overturned)	MMA Attack	November 5, 2011	3	3:00	Warsaw, Poland	Result overturned by promotion.
Loss	8–4	Amir Sadollah	Decision (unanimous)	UFC 122	November 13, 2010	3	5:00	Oberhausen, Germany	
Loss	8–3	James Wilks	Decision (unanimous)	UFC 115	June 12, 2010	3	5:00	Vancouver, British Columbia, Canada	
Loss	8–2	Paul Taylor	Decision (unanimous)	UFC 99	June 13, 2009	3	5:00	Cologne, Germany	
Win	8–1	Kerim Abzailow	TKO (punches)	KSW Extra	September 13, 2008	3	1:12	Dąbrowa Górnicza, Poland	
Win	7–1	Dominique Stetefeld	Submission (triangle choke)	Free Fight Association	July 12, 2008	1	4:38	Erfurt, Germany	
Win	6–1	Simon Fiess	TKO (punches)	Free Fight Association	July 12, 2008	1	0:38	Erfurt, Germany	
Win	5–1	Robin Dutry	Submission (armbar)	Outsider Cup 9	June 14, 2008	1	1:11	Bielefeld, Germany	
Loss	4–1	Nelson Siegert	Submission (punches)	FFC: Battle for the Belt	October 15, 2006	2	4:55	Leipzig, Germany	
Win	4–0	Hendrik Nitzsche	TKO (punches)	FFC: Battle for the Belt	October 15, 2006	1	3:15	Leipzig, Germany	
Win	3–0	Peter Micuch	TKO (punches)	FFC: Heaven or Hell	April 23, 2006	1	3:15	Leipzig, Germany	
Win	2–0	Peter Salzgeber	Submission (rear-naked choke)	UCS: Fighting Day 2	November 19, 2005	1	0:33	Geislingen, Germany	
Win	1–0	Christian Bruckner	Submission (armbar)	Free Fight Championship	October 24, 2004	1	1:00	Leipzig, Germany	

== See also ==
- List of current UFC fighters
- List of male mixed martial artists
