= UFC 99 =

UFC mixed martial arts event in 2009

UFC 99: The Comeback
- The poster for UFC 99: The Comeback
- Promotion: Ultimate Fighting Championship
- Date: June 13, 2009
- Venue: Lanxess Arena
- City: Cologne, Germany
- Attendance: 12,854
- Total gate: $1,300,000
- Buyrate: 360,000

Event chronology
UFC 98: Evans vs. Machida	UFC 99: The Comeback	The Ultimate Fighter: United States vs. United Kingdom Finale

UFC 99: The Comeback was a mixed martial arts event held by the Ultimate Fighting Championship (UFC) on June 13, 2009, in Cologne, Germany.

== Background ==
This was the first UFC event held in Germany, as well as the first in mainland Europe (events have previously been held in the United Kingdom, Ireland, Canada, the continental United States, Brazil, and Japan).

On Monday, June 1, the UFC announced that Mirko Cro Cop would be returning to the promotion to face Mostapha al-Turk at UFC 99. It was Cro Cop's first fight in the UFC since his unanimous-decision loss to Cheick Kongo at UFC 75 in 2007.

An announced bout between Heath Herring and Cain Velasquez was cancelled due to an illness that Herring was suffering. On May 20, 2009, Cheick Kongo was announced as the replacement.

== Results ==
Main card (PPV)
Weight class				Method	Round	Time	Notes
Catchweight (195 lb)	Rich Franklin	def.	Wanderlei Silva	Decision (unanimous) (30–27, 29–28, 30–27)	3	5:00
Heavyweight	Cain Velasquez	def.	Cheick Kongo	Decision (unanimous) (30–27, 30–27, 30–27)	3	5:00
Heavyweight	Mirko Cro Cop	def.	Mostapha al-Turk	TKO (punches)	1	3:06
Welterweight	Mike Swick	def.	Ben Saunders	TKO (punches)	2	3:47
Lightweight	Spencer Fisher	def.	Caol Uno	Decision (unanimous) (29–28, 29–28, 29–28)	3	5:00
Welterweight	Dan Hardy	def.	Marcus Davis	Decision (split) (29–28, 28–29, 29–28)	3	5:00
Preliminary card
Lightweight	Terry Etim	def.	Justin Buchholz	Submission (D'Arce choke)	2	2:38
Lightweight	Dennis Siver	def.	Dale Hartt	Submission (rear-naked choke)	1	3:23
Welterweight	Paul Taylor	def.	Peter Sobotta	Decision (unanimous) (30–27, 30–27, 30–27)	3	5:00
Lightweight	Paul Kelly	def.	Rolando Delgado	Decision (unanimous) (29–28, 29–28, 29–28)	3	5:00
Heavyweight	Stefan Struve	def.	Denis Stojnić	Submission (rear-naked choke)	2	2:37
Welterweight	John Hathaway	def.	Rick Story	Decision (unanimous) (29–28, 30–27, 29–28)	3	5:00

== Bonus awards ==
The following fighters received $60,000 bonuses.

- Fight of the Night: Rich Franklin vs. Wanderlei Silva
- Knockout of the Night: Mike Swick
- Submission of the Night: Terry Etim

== See also ==
- Ultimate Fighting Championship
- List of UFC champions
- List of UFC events
- 2009 in UFC
