= UFC 105 =

UFC mixed martial arts event in 2009

UFC 105: Couture vs. Vera
- The poster for UFC 105: Couture vs. Vera
- Promotion: Ultimate Fighting Championship
- Date: November 14, 2009
- Venue: Evening News Arena
- City: Manchester, United Kingdom
- Attendance: 16,693
- Total gate: $2,000,000

Event chronology
UFC 104: Machida vs. Shogun	UFC 105: Couture vs. Vera	UFC 106: Ortiz vs. Griffin 2

UFC 105: Couture vs. Vera was a mixed martial arts event held by the Ultimate Fighting Championship (UFC) on November 14, 2009, in Manchester, United Kingdom at the Manchester Evening News Arena. This event aired on the same day, via tape delay, on Spike in the U.S.

== Background ==
A previously rumoured Lightweight Championship bout between B.J. Penn and Diego Sanchez did not take place at this event. At the UFC 102 press conference, White said it was likely that the fight will be moved to a third event in November which was at the time still unannounced. It was later announced that the bout would take place at UFC 107.

A bout between Antônio Rogério Nogueira and Luiz Arthur Cane was moved to UFC 106. Dong Hyun Kim was forced to pull out of his bout with Dan Hardy due to an injury. He was replaced by Mike Swick.

The winner of Mike Swick vs. Dan Hardy was said to receive a title shot at Georges St-Pierre in early 2010. This fight took place at UFC 111. A previously announced bout between Peter Sobotta and DaMarques Johnson was cancelled due to a military commitment for Sobotta.

UFC 105 drew an average of 2.9 million viewers on Spike TV.

== Results ==
Main card
Weight class				Method	Round	Time	Notes
Light Heavyweight	Randy Couture	def	Brandon Vera	Decision (unanimous) (29–28, 29–28, 29–28)	3	5:00
Welterweight	Dan Hardy	def	Mike Swick	Decision (unanimous) (30–27, 30–27, 29–28)	3	5:00
Middleweight	Michael Bisping	def	Denis Kang	TKO (punches)	2	4:24
Welterweight	Matt Brown	def	James Wilks	TKO (punches)	3	2:27
Lightweight	Ross Pearson	def	Aaron Riley	TKO (doctor stoppage)	2	4:38
Preliminary card
Welterweight	John Hathaway	def	Paul Taylor	Decision (unanimous) (30–27, 30–27, 30–26)	3	5:00
Lightweight	Terry Etim	def	Shannon Gugerty	Submission (guillotine choke)	2	1:24
Welterweight	Nick Osipczak	def	Matthew Riddle	TKO (punches)	3	3:53
Lightweight	Dennis Siver	def	Paul Kelly	TKO (spinning back kick and punches)	2	2:53
Light Heavyweight	Alexander Gustafsson	def	Jared Hamman	KO (punches)	1	0:41
Lightweight	Andre Winner	def	Rolando Delgado	KO (punch)	1	3:22

== Bonus awards ==
The following fighters received $40,000 bonuses.

- Fight of the Night: Michael Bisping vs. Denis Kang
- Knockout of the Night: Dennis Siver
- Submission of the Night: Terry Etim

== See also ==
- 2009 in UFC
- List of UFC champions
- List of UFC events
- Ultimate Fighting Championship
