= UFC 95 =

UFC mixed martial arts event in 26.02.2025

UFC 95: Sanchez vs Stevenson
- The poster for UFC 95: Sanchez vs Stevenson
- Promotion: Ultimate Fighting Championship
- Date: February 21, 2009
- Venue: The O_{2} Arena
- City: London, United Kingdom
- Attendance: 13,268
- Total gate: $1,000,000 (approximate)

Event chronology
UFC Fight Night: Lauzon vs. Stephens	UFC 95: Sanchez vs Stevenson	UFC 96: Jackson vs. Jardine

UFC 95: Sanchez vs. Stevenson was a mixed martial arts event held by the Ultimate Fighting Championship (UFC) on February 21, 2009, at The O_{2} Arena in London, United Kingdom.

== Background ==
The event was broadcast live for viewers in Europe and Canada and later tape delayed for U.S. viewers on Spike. The bout was headlined by season one and two winners of The Ultimate Fighter.

Neil Grove was originally scheduled to face Justin McCully, but the bout was cancelled when McCully withdrew from the fight. Grove instead faced Mike Ciesnolevicz.

Per Eklund was originally scheduled to face David Baron, but the bout was cancelled when Baron withdrew from the fight. Eklund instead faced Evan Dunham.

Terry Etim was originally scheduled to face Justin Buchholz, but the bout was cancelled when Buchholz had a staph infection. He was replaced by UFC newcomer Brian Cobb.

Stefan Struve made his UFC debut at this event.

The event drew an average of 2.4 million viewers on Spike TV.

== Results ==
Main card (Spike TV)
Weight class				Method	Round	Time	Notes
Lightweight	Diego Sanchez	def.	Joe Stevenson	Decision (unanimous) (29–28, 30–27, 30–27)	3	5:00
Welterweight	Dan Hardy	def.	Rory Markham	KO (punch)	1	1:09
Middleweight	Nate Marquardt	def.	Wilson Gouveia	TKO (knee and punches)	3	3:10
Middleweight	Demian Maia	def.	Chael Sonnen	Submission (triangle choke)	1	2:37
Welterweight	Paulo Thiago	def.	Josh Koscheck	KO (punch)	1	3:29
Preliminary card
Lightweight	Terry Etim	def.	Brian Cobb	TKO (head kick and punches)	2	0:10
Heavyweight	Junior dos Santos	def.	Stefan Struve	TKO (punches)	1	0:54
Lightweight	Evan Dunham	def.	Per Eklund	TKO (punches)	1	2:14
Heavyweight	Mike Ciesnolevicz	def.	Neil Grove	Submission (heel hook)	1	1:03
Welterweight	Paul Kelly	def.	Troy Mandaloniz	Decision (unanimous) (30–27, 30–27, 30–28)	3	5:00

== Bonus awards ==
The following fighters received $40,000 bonuses.

- Fight of the Night: Diego Sanchez vs. Joe Stevenson
- Knockout of the Night: Paulo Thiago
- Submission of the Night: Demian Maia

== See also ==
- Ultimate Fighting Championship
- List of UFC champions
- List of UFC events
- 2009 in UFC
