= UFC Live: Kongo vs. Barry =

UFC mixed martial arts event in 2011

- The poster for UFC Live: Kongo vs. Barry
- Promotion: Ultimate Fighting Championship
- Date: June 26, 2011
- Venue: Consol Energy Center
- City: Pittsburgh, Pennsylvania
- Attendance: 7,792
- Total gate: $562,000

Event chronology
UFC 131: dos Santos vs. Carwin	UFC Live: Kongo vs. Barry	UFC 132: Cruz vs. Faber 2

UFC Live: Kongo vs. Barry (also known as UFC on Versus 4) was a mixed martial arts event held by the Ultimate Fighting Championship on June 26, 2011, at Consol Energy Center in Pittsburgh, Pennsylvania. The event was broadcast on Versus in the U.S. and was broadcast on Rogers Sportsnet in Canada.

== Background ==
This is the fourth live UFC card to appear on Versus.

Matthew Riddle was expected to face T. J. Grant, but was forced from the bout with an injury and replaced by Charlie Brenneman. However, just days before the event Grant was forced from the card due to an unknown illness. Without proper time to find a replacement the bout was scrapped.

Anthony Johnson was expected to face Nate Marquardt in the main event, but was forced from the bout with a rotator cuff injury and replaced by Rick Story. However, Nate Marquardt did not receive medical clearance the day of the weigh-ins and therefore pulled out of the main event. Charlie Brenneman, whose earlier bout with T. J. Grant was removed from the card, stepped in to fight Rick Story, while the Pat Barry vs. Cheick Kongo fight was promoted to the main event. Dana White subsequently announced that Marquardt would be cut from the UFC due to the seriousness of the failed medical clearance but because of Pennsylvania health privacy laws, White could not disclose the specifics of the case

Martin Kampmann was expected to face John Howard, but was forced from the bout with an injury and replaced by Matt Brown. Brown's original opponent Rich Attonito faced Daniel Roberts.

The entire preliminary card was streamed on Facebook.

The event drew an estimated 744,000 viewers on Versus.

== Results ==
Main Card (Versus)
Weight class				Method	Round	Time	Notes
Heavyweight	Cheick Kongo	def.	Pat Barry	KO (punch)	1	2:39
Welterweight	Charlie Brenneman	def.	Rick Story	Decision (unanimous) (29–28, 29–28, 29–28)	3	5:00
Welterweight	Matt Brown	def.	John Howard	Decision (unanimous) (29–28, 29–28, 29–28)	3	5:00
Heavyweight	Matt Mitrione	def.	Christian Morecraft	KO (punches)	2	4:28
Preliminary card (Facebook)
Weight class				Method	Round	Time	Notes
Featherweight	Tyson Griffin	def.	Manvel Gamburyan	Decision (majority) (29–28, 29–28, 29–29)	3	5:00
Featherweight	Javier Vazquez	def.	Joe Stevenson	Decision (unanimous) (30–27, 29–28, 30–27)	3	5:00
Lightweight	Joe Lauzon	def.	Curt Warburton	Submission (kimura)	1	1:58
Welterweight	Rich Attonito	def.	Daniel Roberts	Decision (unanimous) (29–27, 30–27, 29–28)	3	5:00
Lightweight	Charles Oliveira	vs	Nik Lentz	No Contest (illegal knee)	2	1:48	(Note: Originally ruled a Submission (rear naked choke) win for Oliveira, result was overturned due to an illegal knee by Oliveira.)
Featherweight	Ricardo Lamas	def.	Matt Grice	TKO (head kick and punches)	1	4:41
Lightweight	Michael Johnson	def.	Edward Faaloloto	TKO (punches)	1	4:42

== Bonus awards ==
The following fighters received $50,000 bonuses.

- Fight of the Night: Nik Lentz vs. Charles Oliveira
- Knockout of the Night: Cheick Kongo
- Submission of the Night: Joe Lauzon
