= Dan Hardy =

English mixed martial arts fighter and combat sport commentator

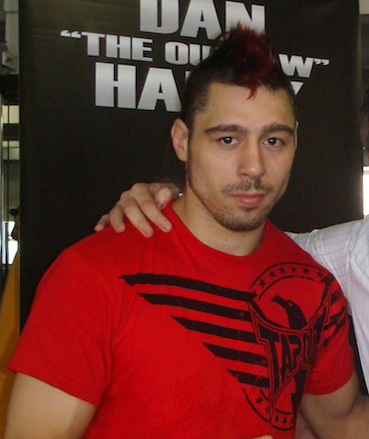
- Dan Hardy at the UFC 146 Weigh-ins
- Born: Daniel Mark Hardy; 17 May 1982 (age 44); Nottingham, England
- Other names: The Outlaw
- Height: 6 ft 0 in (1.83 m)
- Weight: 170 lb (77 kg; 12 st 2 lb)
- Division: Welterweight
- Reach: 74.0 in (188 cm)
- Stance: Orthodox
- Fighting out of: Nottingham, England
- Team: Hardy-Wallhead MMA
- Rank: Black belt in Taekwondo; Brown belt in Brazilian Jiu-Jitsu
- Years active: 2004–2012 (MMA)

Mixed martial arts record
- Total: 36
- Wins: 25
- By knockout: 14
- By submission: 2
- By decision: 9
- Losses: 10
- By knockout: 1
- By submission: 4
- By decision: 4
- By disqualification: 1
- No contests: 1

Other information
- University: Nottingham Trent University
- Website: http://www.danhardymma.co.uk/
- Mixed martial arts record from Sherdog
- Last updated on: 3 August 2011

Daniel Mark Hardy (born 17 May 1982) is an English former mixed martial artist who fought in the welterweight division. During his professional MMA career, which began in 2004, Hardy fought in multiple promotions, such as Cage Force and Cage Warriors, before signing a contract with the Ultimate Fighting Championship (UFC) in 2008. In 2010, he fought Georges St-Pierre for the UFC Welterweight Championship, but lost the bout via decision.

== Biography ==
Hardy was born in Nottingham, England, where he began martial arts training at the age of 5. Hardy's initial education was in taekwondo, and he later began competing at the age of 7. He started practising other martial arts as a teenager, which included karate, jujutsu, judo and eventually wushu. He began muay Thai and boxing at the age of 19. He then moved to mixed martial arts a year later. His nickname, "The Outlaw", comes from the screen name he used online when he was looking for training partners after a disagreement with a coach which led to his former training partners being forbidden to work with him.

=== Ultimate Fighting Championship ===
Hardy defeated Akihiro Gono via split decision in his UFC debut at UFC 89 on 18 October 2008. Gono was left swollen and bloody by several of Hardy's left hooks. Gono rocked Hardy on several occasions. In the third round, Gono pushed Hardy to the canvas and while there, landed an illegal knee to the head of the downed fighter causing the fight to be stopped for a lengthy period and a point deduction for Gono. Hardy recovered and went on to win the split decision (29–28, 28–29, and 29–28).

Hardy knocked out Rory Markham at 1:09 of the first round on 21 February 2009 at UFC 95. In his post-fight interview, Hardy retorted to Markham's pre-fight accusation that he had weak hands by exclaiming to the ecstatic crowd, "No punching power? What do you have to say about that?"

Hardy next faced Marcus Davis at UFC 99 on 13 June 2009. The grudge between the two began with the American Davis fighting in the UK against local fighters and defeating them all. Hardy stated that the UK was his home and began openly insulting Davis, calling him a 'fake Irishman' and stating that Davis's website "looked like a St. Patrick's day gift shop blew up." Afterwards, on a UK underground MMA website, Hardy encouraged fans to post photoshopped pictures of Davis in a homosexual fashion. The pictures upset Davis, causing him to confront Hardy at a UFC 99 press conference. The two continued to argue, but finally agreed to settle it in the cage. Hardy won the fight via split decision. Davis stormed out of the cage, ignoring Hardy's attempts to make peace. Davis later told reporters that he wanted a rematch with Hardy in Ireland or Boston, as well as stating how controversial he thought the decision was. Hardy insisted in his post-fight interview with Davis (and after the event to fans) that all of the controversy was an effort to get Davis off his game-plan and that it was nothing personal.

On 14 November 2009 at UFC 105, he faced Mike Swick, who replaced an injured Dong Hyun Kim. At a press conference in Manchester Hardy was the underdog coming into the fight, but managed to rock Swick early in the first round with a straight right hand, which appeared to dent the American's confidence. Hardy won the fight via unanimous decision (30–27, 30–27, and 29–28) and booked his place as the #1 contender for the UFC Welterweight Championship. In being awarded the title shot, Hardy became the first English fighter in UFC history to receive one. UFC President Dana White confirmed at the post-fight press conference that the fight would most likely be held in Las Vegas. Hardy stated in a post-fight interview with Sherdog.com that the next event in Las Vegas (UFC 109) in February was too early for him and he would rather wait.

=== Title shot ===
Hardy fought Georges St-Pierre for the welterweight title on 27 March 2010 at UFC 111 in Newark, New Jersey. St-Pierre won the bout via unanimous decision. After the fight, St-Pierre stated his surprise that Hardy refused to tap. In the post-fight interview with Joe Rogan, Hardy stated "....tap?...I don't know the meaning of tap."

=== Post-title fight ===
Hardy faced Carlos Condit on 16 October 2010 at UFC 120 in his home country. During an exchange late in the first round, both Hardy and Condit threw left hooks at the same time: Hardy's punch staggered Condit, although Condit's punch dropped Hardy. Condit followed up with two more punches on the ground, causing the referee to stop the fight at 4:27 of the first round, giving Hardy his first KO loss.

Hardy faced Anthony Johnson on 26 March 2011 at UFC Fight Night 24. Hardy lost via unanimous decision.

Hardy faced Chris Lytle on 14 August 2011 at UFC on Versus 5. Hardy stated that he had changed his training going into the fight, moving to Las Vegas to train at the Country Club with Roy Nelson to work on his grappling, particularly his wrestling defence/offence. He lost the fight via guillotine choke late in the third round. The bout was awarded Fight of the Night honours. Despite losing four fights in a row, Lorenzo Fertitta quoted he would not cut Hardy from the UFC, stating: "I ain't cutting Dan Hardy. I love guys that war!".

Hardy faced Duane Ludwig on 26 May 2012 at UFC 146. Hardy defeated Ludwig via first-round KO, earning him his first victory since 2009.

He defeated Amir Sadollah via unanimous decision (29–28, 29–28, and 30–27) at UFC on Fuel TV 5 on 29 September 2012.

Hardy was expected to face Matt Brown on 20 April 2013 at UFC on Fox 7. However, Hardy was diagnosed with Wolff–Parkinson–White pattern and replaced by Jordan Mein.

=== Medical condition ===
In 2013, Hardy was diagnosed with Wolff–Parkinson–White syndrome. A treatment for Wolff–Parkinson–White syndrome is ablation, cauterising of heart tissue to fix the electrical pathway issue, however Hardy has refused to have this treatment on the basis that the condition has never actually given him any problems. Eventually in October 2018 Hardy said in an interview that he has been medically cleared and eligible to return to fighting.

During his hiatus, Hardy served as a commentator for UFC's Fight Pass events, and works as an analyst on Fox Sports. In August 2017, Hardy joined Sky Sports as an analyst for Floyd Mayweather vs. Conor McGregor. On 15 August 2019 Hardy appeared as a guest on The Joe Rogan Experience, revealing he is joining USADA testing pool in order to be eligible for competition.

While on commentator duties for the second Polaris Squads event, Hardy revealed that he was planning to make his return to professional MMA for one final fight in the UFC at some point in 2021.

=== UFC commentator ===
While working as a commentator at UFC on ESPN: Whittaker vs. Till on 26 July 2020, Dan Hardy was involved in a verbal confrontation with referee Herb Dean after Hardy took offence to what he believed to be a late stoppage by Dean in a bout between Francisco Trinaldo and Jai Herbert. UFC president Dana White indicated afterwards that he would not take action against Hardy but that he would not tolerate any confrontations of officials in the future.

In March 2021, news surfaced that Hardy had been released from the UFC after he had been involved in another argument with a female UFC employee. Hardy disputed that he was terminated, however, and stated "I am no longer working directly with the UFC, ‘female’ part is irrelevant. It was a disagreement over an opportunity missed, or withheld, and I’d love some answers but can’t get any."

In May 2021, Hardy announced that he had been released from his UFC fight contract.

== Personal life ==
Hardy is a fan of punk, metal and hardcore music. His favourite hardcore bands include Earth Crisis, Madball, and Blood for Blood. His opening song is "England Belongs To Me" by the British Oi! band Cock Sparrer, and he and the band have recorded a version of the song together. He has a passion for art, rarely spending a day without a sketch pad in his bag until the age of 22. He gave up his degree in art and design in his final year at Nottingham Trent University to pursue MMA full-time. Hardy lives in England. In recent years, he has also become an outspoken critic of trophy hunting on numerous occasions, even calling Matt Hughes "bad for the sport" due to his trophy-hunting in the States and abroad. Hardy is an agnostic. In 2015, Hardy was part of the Great Britain team for the first leg of the Clipper Round the World Yacht Race.

Hardy married UFC fighter Veronica Macedo on 25 December 2022.

== Championships and achievements ==
- Ultimate Fighting Championship
  - Knockout of the Night (One time)
  - Fight Of The Night (One time)
- Cage Warriors Fighting Championship
  - UFC.com Awards
    - 2009: Ranked #6 Fighter of the Year
  - Cage Warriors Welterweight Champion (Two times)
- CombatPress.com
  - 2019 Broadcast Analyst of the Year

== Mixed martial arts record ==
Professional record breakdown
36 matches	25 wins	10 losses
By knockout	14	1
By submission	2	4
By decision	9	4
By disqualification	0	1
No contests	1	

Res.	Record	Opponent	Method	Event	Date	Round	Time	Location	Notes
Win	25–10 (1)	Amir Sadollah	Decision (unanimous)	UFC on Fuel TV: Struve vs. Miocic	29 September 2012	3	5:00	Nottingham, England	
Win	24–10 (1)	Duane Ludwig	KO (punch and elbows)	UFC 146	26 May 2012	1	3:51	Las Vegas, Nevada, United States	Knockout of the Night.
Loss	23–10 (1)	Chris Lytle	Submission (guillotine choke)	UFC Live: Hardy vs. Lytle	14 August 2011	3	4:16	Milwaukee, Wisconsin, United States	Fight of the Night.
Loss	23–9 (1)	Anthony Johnson	Decision (unanimous)	UFC Fight Night: Nogueira vs. Davis	26 March 2011	3	5:00	Seattle, Washington, United States	
Loss	23–8 (1)	Carlos Condit	KO (punch)	UFC 120	16 October 2010	1	4:27	London, England	
Loss	23–7 (1)	Georges St-Pierre	Decision (unanimous)	UFC 111	27 March 2010	5	5:00	Newark, New Jersey, United States	For the UFC Welterweight Championship.
Win	23–6 (1)	Mike Swick	Decision (unanimous)	UFC 105	14 November 2009	3	5:00	Manchester, England	UFC Welterweight title eliminator.
Win	22–6 (1)	Marcus Davis	Decision (split)	UFC 99	13 June 2009	3	5:00	Cologne, Germany	
Win	21–6 (1)	Rory Markham	KO (punch)	UFC 95	21 February 2009	1	1:09	London, England	
Win	20–6 (1)	Akihiro Gono	Decision (split)	UFC 89	18 October 2008	3	5:00	Birmingham, England	
Win	19–6 (1)	Daniel Weichel	TKO (elbows)	Ultimate Force: Punishment	3 May 2008	2	1:49	Doncaster, England	
Win	18–6 (1)	Chad Reiner	TKO (punches)	CWFC: Enter the Rough House 6	19 April 2008	3	2:10	Nottingham, England	Defended the Cage Warriors Welterweight Championship.
Win	17–6 (1)	Manuel Garcia	TKO (submission to punches)	CWFC: Enter The Rough House 5	8 December 2007	1	2:21	Nottingham, England	Defended the Cage Warriors Welterweight Championship.
Loss	16–6 (1)	Yoshiyuki Yoshida	DQ (groin kick)	GCM: Cage Force 5	1 December 2007	2	0:04	Tokyo, Japan	GCM welterweight final.
Win	16–5 (1)	Hidetaka Monma	TKO (corner stoppage)	GCM: Cage Force 4	8 September 2007	3	0:29	Tokyo, Japan	GCM welterweight semi-final.
Win	15–5 (1)	Daizo Ishige	Decision (unanimous)	GCM: Cage Force EX Eastern Bound	27 May 2007	3	5:00	Tokyo, Japan	GCM welterweight quarter-final.
Win	14–5 (1)	Willy Ni	Submission (guillotine choke)	CWFC: Enter The Rough House 2	28 April 2007	2	0:39	Nottingham, England	Defended the Cage Warriors Welterweight Championship.
Win	13–5 (1)	Alexandre Izidro	TKO (punches)	CWFC: Enter The Rough House	9 December 2006	3	4:56	Nottingham, England	Defended the Cage Warriors Welterweight Championship.
Win	12–5 (1)	Danny Rushton	TKO (retirement)	CWFC: Showdown	16 September 2006	1	5:00	Sheffield, England	Defended the Cage Warriors Welterweight Championship.
Loss	11–5 (1)	David Baron	Decision	2 Hot 2 Handle: Road to Japan	18 June 2006	2	3:00	Amsterdam, Netherlands	
Loss	11–4 (1)	Forrest Petz	Decision (unanimous)	Fightfest 2	14 April 2006	3	5:00	Canton, Ohio, United States	
Win	11–3 (1)	Diego Gonzalez	TKO (doctor stoppage)	CWFC: Strike Force 5	25 March 2006	3	0:19	Coventry, England	Defended the Cage Warriors Welterweight Championship.
Win	10–3 (1)	Matt Thorpe	Decision (split)	CWFC: Strike Force 4	26 November 2005	5	5:00	Coventry, England	Won the vacant Cage Warriors Welterweight Championship.
NC	9–3 (1)	Diego Gonzalez	NC (overturned)	CWFC: Strike Force 3	1 October 2005	2	1:19	Coventry, England	Originally a submission (arm-triangle choke) win for Gonzalez; overturned due to punches to the back of the head.
Win	9–3	Sami Berik	Decision (unanimous)	CWFC: Quest 3	17 September 2005	3	5:00	Sheffield, England	
Win	8–3	Lautaro Arborelo	TKO (punches)	CWFC: Strike Force 2	16 July 2005	3	3:52	Coventry, England	
Win	7–3	Alexandre Izidro	Decision (unanimous)	KOTC: Warzone	24 June 2005	2	5:00	Sheffield, England	
Win	6–3	Stuart Barrs	TKO (punches)	UK Storm 2	18 June 2005	2	2:44	Birmingham, England	
Loss	5–3	David Baron	Submission (triangle choke)	CWFC: Strike Force	21 May 2005	2	3:10	Coventry, England	
Win	5–2	Andy Walker	TKO (punches)	CWFC: Quest 1	8 April 2005	1	3:26	Yorkshire, England	
Win	4–2	Lee Doski	Submission (injury)	Fight Club UK 1	29 January 2005	2	N/A	Sheffield, England	
Win	3–2	Aaron Barrow	KO (head kick and punches)	CWFC 9: Xtreme Xmas	18 December 2004	1	0:13	Sheffield, England	
Loss	2–2	Pat Healy	Submission (guillotine choke)	Absolute Fighting Championships 10	30 October 2004	1	3:50	Fort Lauderdale, Florida, United States	
Win	2–1	Andy Melia	TKO (submission to punches)	CWFC 8: Brutal Force	18 September 2004	2	3:55	Sheffield, England	
Win	1–1	Paul Jenkins	Decision (majority)	Full Contact Fight Night 2	14 August 2004	3	5:00	Portsmouth, England	
Loss	0–1	Lee Doski	Submission (rear-naked choke)	Extreme Brawl 7	6 June 2004	2	4:59	Bracknell, England	

== See also ==
- List of male mixed martial artists
