= Edward Faaloloto =

American mixed martial arts fighter

- Born: July 15, 1984 (age 42); Honolulu, Hawaii, United States
- Other names: Falo
- Height: 5 ft 9 in (1.75 m)
- Weight: 155 lb (70 kg; 11.1 st)
- Division: Welterweight; Lightweight
- Reach: 70 in (180 cm)
- Fighting out of: Honolulu, Hawaii, United States
- Team: Ultimate Fight School
- Rank: Brown belt in Kajukembo; Blue belt in Brazilian Jiu-Jitsu
- Years active: 2009-2013

Mixed martial arts record
- Total: 7
- Wins: 2
- By submission: 1
- By decision: 1
- Losses: 5
- By knockout: 2
- By submission: 2
- By decision: 1

Other information
- Mixed martial arts record from Sherdog

Edward Faaloloto (born July 15, 1984) is an American former mixed martial artist. A professional from 2009 until 2013, he competed for the UFC, WEC, and Pancrase.

== Early life ==
Faaloloto was born in Honolulu, Hawaii, but moved to Long Beach, California as an infant. There he was raised by his grandparents until the age of 10. Faaloloto believed his grandparents were his birth parents until his grandfather had a stroke and told Faaloloto about his real mother in Hawaii. Soon after, Faaloloto moved back to Hawaii and was reunited with his mother and half-siblings. At 15, Faaloloto began training martial arts at a local Kajukembo dojo in Hawaii under Paul Padilla. Faaloloto did not start fighting until his time enlisted in the Navy after graduating high school, taking amateur bouts throughout San Diego. He spent five years in the service, originally, based out of San Diego, California working as a bosun's mate. He was then transferred to Hawaii to work as an admiral's bodyguard. He ended his time in the service in October 2008 to pursue a career in fighting.

== Mixed martial arts career ==
=== Early career ===
Faaloloto made his professional debut in 2009, fighting for Hawaii's X-1 MMA. He defeated Taylor Cochran via unanimous decision in a welterweight bout. Six months later Faaloloto again fought for X-1 MMA, defeating Justin Babbs via kimura only 49 seconds into round one.

=== World Extreme Cagefighting ===
In 2010, Faaloloto signed with the World Extreme Cagefighting, also known as the WEC.

Faaloloto dropped down to the lightweight division to make his WEC debut against Anthony Njokuani at WEC 52 on November 11, 2010, in Las Vegas, Nevada. Faaloloto was defeated via TKO nearing the end of round 2.

=== Ultimate Fighting Championship ===
In October 2010, World Extreme Cagefighting merged with the Ultimate Fighting Championship. As part of the merger, all WEC fighters were transferred to the UFC.

Faaloloto made his UFC debut on June 26, 2011, at UFC Live: Kongo vs. Barry against TUF 12 runner-up, Michael Johnson. Faaloloto was defeated via TKO in round one.

In his sophomore outing for the UFC, Faaloloto faced Terry Etim on November 5, 2011, at UFC 138. Faaloloto was defeated by Etim via guillotine choke 17 seconds into the first round.

After going 0–3, Faaloloto was subsequently released from the promotion.

== Personal life ==
Faaloloto is of Samoan and Italian descent. In high school, Faaloloto was shot in the hand while at a party. He was also stabbed in the arm fighting off two muggers on a different night. Faaloloto has a daughter. Faaloloto earned a degree Kapi'Olani Community College in Hawaii, in order to pursue a career as an English teacher.

== Mixed martial arts record ==
Professional record breakdown
| 7 matches | 2 wins | 5 losses |
| By knockout | 0 | 2 |
| By submission | 1 | 2 |
| By decision | 1 | 1 |

| Res. | Record | Opponent | Method | Event | Date | Round | Time | Location | Notes |
|---|---|---|---|---|---|---|---|---|---|
| Loss | 2–5 | Kiichi Kunimoto | Submission (armbar) | HEAT: HEAT 27 | July 28, 2013 | 1 | 1:55 | Kobe, Japan | Welterweight bout. |
| Loss | 2–4 | Yoshiaki Takashi | Decision (unanimous) | Pancrase Progress Tour 12: All Eyes on Yuki Kondo | November 10, 2012 | 3 | 5:00 | Tokyo, Japan | |
| Loss | 2–3 | Terry Etim | Submission (guillotine choke) | UFC 138 | November 5, 2011 | 1 | 0:17 | Birmingham, England | |
| Loss | 2–2 | Michael Johnson | TKO (punches) | UFC Live: Kongo vs. Barry | June 26, 2011 | 1 | 4:42 | Pittsburgh, Pennsylvania, United States | |
| Loss | 2–1 | Anthony Njokuani | TKO (elbow) | WEC 52 | November 11, 2010 | 2 | 4:54 | Las Vegas, Nevada, United States | Lightweight debut. |
| Win | 2–0 | Justin Babbs | Submission (kimura) | X-1: Showdown in Waipahu 2 | May 15, 2010 | 1 | 0:49 | Honolulu, Hawaii, United States | |
| Win | 1–0 | Taylor Cochran | Decision (unanimous) | X-1: Scuffle on Schofield 2 | November 7, 2009 | 3 | 3:00 | Honolulu, Hawaii, United States | |

== See also ==
- List of male mixed martial artists
