= John-Olav Einemo =

Norwegian mixed martial artist and Brazilian Jiu-Jitsu practitioner

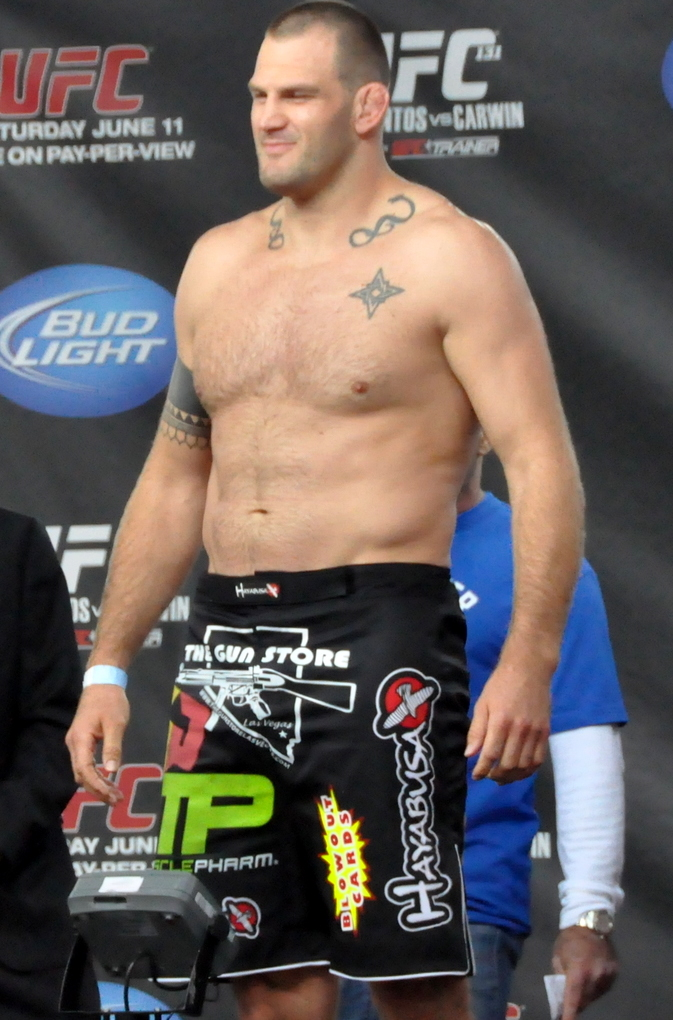
- Einemo in 2011
- Born: December 10, 1975 (age 50); Oslo, Norway
- Other names: The Viking
- Nationality: Norwegian
- Height: 6 ft 6 in (1.98 m)
- Weight: 253 lb (115 kg; 18 st 1 lb)
- Division: Heavyweight (265 lb)
- Reach: 81 in (206 cm)
- Style: Submission wrestling
- Team: Golden Glory
- Rank: black belt in Brazilian Jiu-Jitsu
- Years active: 2000–2003, 2006, 2011–2012 (MMA)

Mixed martial arts record
- Total: 9
- Wins: 6
- By knockout: 1
- By submission: 5
- Losses: 3
- By knockout: 1
- By decision: 2

Other information
- Mixed martial arts record from Sherdog

John-Olav Einemo
Medal record

Representing Norway

Men's Submission Wrestling

ADCC World Championships
Gold medal – first place	2003 Sao Paulo	-99kg

John-Olav Einemo (born 10 December 1975) is a Norwegian retired mixed martial artist. He is also a Brazilian Jiu-Jitsu practitioner, with the highlight of his career being the win in the ADCC Submission Wrestling World Championship in 2003 (88–98 kg weight class). He is the only man to defeat multiple-time BJJ champion Roger Gracie in the ADCC Submission Wrestling World Championship tournament. He holds a black belt in Brazilian Jiu-Jitsu.

== Mixed martial arts career ==
=== Early career ===
Einemo made his professional MMA debut in the year 2000. He fought for a number of promotions in Finland and the Netherlands, quickly amassing an undefeated record of 4–0. He made his Japanese debut in 2003 for the Shooto promotion in 2003.

Einemo did not compete from 2003 to 2006 due to complications of contracting a flesh-eating bacterial infection on his left foot following surgery. He completely recovered and returned to fighting in early 2006. He experienced his first professional loss in PRIDE Fighting Championships where he lost to Fabrício Werdum by unanimous decision at Pride 31.

=== Ultimate Fighting Championship ===
On March 7, 2011, Einemo signed with the UFC to join their Heavyweight Division.

Einemo was scheduled to make his UFC debut against Shane Carwin on June 11, 2011 at UFC 131. However, once Brock Lesnar pulled out of his fight against Junior dos Santos after again suffering with diverticulitis, Carwin stepped in to take Lesnar's place in the main event. Einemo instead fought fellow UFC newcomer Dave Herman. Einemo lost via TKO (punches) at 3:19 of round 2. This fight earned him Fight of the Night honors.

On August 3, 2011, Golden Glory announced that Einemo had been released from his contract by the UFC. The UFC later reversed the decision, reinstating Einemo.

In his second UFC fight, Einemo faced Mike Russow on January 28, 2012 at UFC on Fox: Evans vs. Davis. He lost the fight via unanimous decision. He was subsequently released from the promotion.

=== Retirement ===
Einemo announced his retirement from mixed martial arts on April 3, 2012. He said he would continue to stay involved in the sport as a coach and help the sport grow in his native Norway.

== Championships and accomplishments ==
=== ADCC career ===
- 2007 Superfight – Lost against Roger Gracie
- 2005 88–98 kg weight class – Quarter Finals – Won against Vitor Vianna
- 2003 88–98 kg weight class – Final – Won against Alexandre Ferreira
- 2003 88–98 kg weight class – Won against Roger Gracie
- 2001 88–98 kg weight class – Quarter Finals – Won against Rolles Gracie
- 2001 Under 99 kg weight class - Semi-Finals - Lost against Ricardo Arona

=== MMA career ===
- Ultimate Fighting Championship
  - Fight of the Night (One time) vs. Dave Herman

== Mixed martial arts record ==
Professional record breakdown
9 matches	6 wins	3 losses
By knockout	3	1
By submission	3	0
By decision	0	2

Res.	Record	Opponent	Method	Event	Date	Round	Time	Location	Notes
Loss	6–3	Mike Russow	Decision (unanimous)	UFC on Fox: Evans vs. Davis	January 28, 2012	3	5:00	Chicago, Illinois, United States	
Loss	6–2	Dave Herman	TKO (knee and punches)	UFC 131	June 11, 2011	2	3:19	Vancouver, British Columbia, Canada	Fight of the Night.
Win	6–1	James Thompson	Submission (armbar)	2H2H: Pride & Honor	November 12, 2006	1	4:18	Rotterdam, Netherlands	
Loss	5–1	Fabrício Werdum	Decision (unanimous)	PRIDE 31	February 26, 2006	3	5:00	Saitama, Japan	
Win	5–0	Mindaugas Kulikauskas	Submission (armbar)	Shooto: Wanna Shooto 2003	November 3, 2003	1	0:47	Tokyo, Japan	
Win	4–0	Evert Fyeet	TKO (submission to punches)	Shooto Finland	February 22, 2003	1	1:54	Turku, Finland	
Win	3–0	Olaf in 't Veld	TKO (submission to punches)	Shooto Holland	November 4, 2001	1	1:07	Deventer, Netherlands	
Win	2–0	Erkka Shalstrom	TKO (punches)	Finnfight 4	December 2, 2000	1	2:22	Turku, Finland	
Win	1–0	Jan Jarvensivu	Submission (armbar)	Focus Fight Night 4	October 6, 2000	1	4:20	Hämeenlinna, Finland	

== Submission grappling record ==
13 Matches, 8 Wins, 5 Losses
Result	Rec.	Opponent	Method	Event	Division	Date	Location
Loss	8–5	(Brazil) Roger Gracie	Points	ADCC World Championship	Superfight	2007	(United States) Newark, NJ
Loss	8–4	(Brazil) Alexandre Ribeiro	Points	ADCC World Championship	-99 kg	2005	(United States) Los Angeles
Loss	8–3	(Brazil) Alexandre Ferreira	Points	ADCC World Championship	-99 kg	2005	(United States) Los Angeles
Win	8–2	(Brazil) Vitor Vianna	Points	ADCC World Championship	-99 kg	2005	(United States) Los Angeles
Win	7–2	(United States) Rick Macauley	Submission	ADCC World Championship	-99 kg	2005	(United States) Los Angeles
Win	6–2	(Brazil) Alexandre Ferreira	Points	ADCC World Championship	-99 kg	2003	(Brazil) São Paulo
Win	5–2	(Brazil) Roger Gracie	Points	ADCC World Championship	-99 kg	2003	(Brazil) São Paulo
Win	4–2	(Australia) Larry Papadopoulos	Points	ADCC World Championship	-99 kg	2003	(Brazil) São Paulo
Win	3–2	(United States) Brandon Vera	Points	ADCC World Championship	-99 kg	2003	(Brazil) São Paulo
Loss	2–2	(Brazil) Alexandre Ferreira	Points	ADCC World Championship	-99 kg	2001	(United Arab Emirates) Abu Dhabi
Loss	2–1	(Brazil) Ricardo Arona	Points	ADCC World Championship	-99 kg	2001	(United Arab Emirates) Abu Dhabi
Win	2–0	(Brazil) Rolles Gracie	Points	ADCC World Championship	-99 kg	2001	(United Arab Emirates) Abu Dhabi
Win	1–0	(Brazil) Rigan Machado	Points	ADCC World Championship	-99 kg	2001	(United Arab Emirates) Abu Dhabi

== See also ==
- List of male mixed martial artists
