= UFC 89 =

UFC mixed martial arts event in 2008

UFC 89: Bisping vs. Leben
- The poster for UFC 89: Bisping vs. Leben
- Promotion: Ultimate Fighting Championship
- Date: October 18, 2008
- Venue: National Indoor Arena
- City: Birmingham, United Kingdom
- Attendance: 9,515
- Estimated viewers: 2,600,000

Event chronology
UFC Fight Night: Diaz vs. Neer	UFC 89: Bisping vs. Leben	UFC 90: Silva vs Côté

UFC 89: Bisping vs. Leben was a mixed martial arts event held by the Ultimate Fighting Championship (UFC) on October 18, 2008, at the National Indoor Arena in Birmingham, United Kingdom.

== Background ==
The event was headlined by a middleweight bout between Michael Bisping and Chris Leben. After the event, Leben tested positive for Stanozolol, a banned substance. He was suspended for a period of 9 months and fined one third of his purse. Leben admitted he had used the substance several months prior to the fight, but stated he had assumed it would have been out of his system by then.

This event aired live in Great Britain and Ireland on Setanta Sports and via tape delay in the United States and Canada on Spike TV. It also aired live via Rogers Sportsnet in Canada. The broadcast drew an average of 2.6 million viewers and peaked with 3.4 million viewers on Spike TV.

Lyoto Machida was scheduled to face fellow undefeated light heavyweight Thiago Silva, but a back injury forced Silva to withdraw from the fight. The fight was rescheduled for UFC 94.

== Results ==
Main card (Spike TV)
Weight class				Method	Round	Time	Notes
Middleweight	Michael Bisping	def.	Chris Leben	Decision (unanimous) (30–27, 30–27, 29–28)	3	5:00
Light Heavyweight	Keith Jardine	def.	Brandon Vera	Decision (split) (28–29, 29–28, 29–28)	3	5:00
Light Heavyweight	Luiz Cane	def.	Rameau Thierry Sokoudjou	TKO (punches)	2	4:15
Welterweight	Chris Lytle	def.	Paul Taylor	Decision (unanimous) (29–28, 30–27, 29–28)	3	5:00
Welterweight	Marcus Davis	def.	Paul Kelly	Submission (guillotine choke)	2	2:16
Preliminary card
Welterweight	Dan Hardy	def.	Akihiro Gono	Decision (split) (29–28, 28–29, 29–28)	3	5:00
Heavyweight	Shane Carwin	def.	Neil Wain	TKO (punches)	1	1:31
Lightweight	David Bielkheden	def.	Jess Liaudin	Decision (unanimous) (29–28, 29–28, 30–27)	3	5:00
Lightweight	Terry Etim	def.	Sam Stout	Decision (unanimous) (29–28, 29–28, 30–27)	3	5:00
Lightweight	Jim Miller	def.	David Baron	Submission (rear-naked choke)	3	3:19
Lightweight	Per Eklund	def.	Samy Schiavo	Submission (rear-naked choke)	3	1:47

== Bonus awards ==
The following fighters received $40,000 bonuses.

- Fight of the Night: Chris Lytle vs. Paul Taylor
- Knockout of the Night: Luiz Cane
- Submission of the Night: Jim Miller

== See also ==
- Ultimate Fighting Championship
- List of UFC champions
- List of UFC events
- 2008 in UFC
