= Alexandre Ferreira (fighter) =

Brazilian mixed martial arts fighter

- Born: 25 January 1979 (age 47); Rio de Janeiro, Brazil
- Other names: Cacareco
- Height: 5 ft 7 in (1.70 m)
- Weight: 205 lb (93 kg; 14.6 st)
- Division: Heavyweight; Light Heavyweight
- Stance: Orthodox
- Fighting out of: Rio de Janeiro, Brazil
- Team: Chute Boxe Academy; Escola Brunocilla: Ilha do Governador (Luta Livre)
- Rank: Seventh Degree Black belt in Luta Livre under Carlos Brunocilla; Black belt in Brazilian Jiu-Jitsu
- Years active: 1998-2001, 2004-2010

Mixed martial arts record
- Total: 24
- Wins: 18
- By knockout: 3
- By submission: 14
- By decision: 1
- Losses: 6
- By knockout: 2
- By submission: 2
- By decision: 1
- By disqualification: 1

Other information
- Mixed martial arts record from Sherdog

Alexandre Ferreira (born 25 January 1979 in Rio de Janeiro, Brazil) is a retired professional mixed martial artist. A professional from 1998 until 2010, he fought in the UFC, Jungle Fight, RINGS, and the IFL.

== Mixed martial arts career ==
=== Ultimate Fighting Championship ===
Ferreira made his promotional debut against Vladimir Matyushenko on November 13, 2010 at UFC 122, losing via first round TKO.

Ferreira was expected to face Rousimar Palhares on March 3, 2011 at UFC Live: Sanchez vs. Kampmann. However, on January 18, Ferreira was dismissed from Chute Boxe, his home training camp, for a "lack of commitment." Less than an hour later, it was reported that the fight had been cancelled due to Ferreira losing family and friends in the Brazilian floods, resulting in him being in "no condition to train or fight." Palhares faced David Branch.

Ferreira/Palhares was expected to take place on August 27, 2011 at UFC 134. However, Ferreira was released from the organization and replaced by Dan Miller.

== Mixed martial arts record ==
Professional record breakdown
24 matches	18 wins	6 losses
By knockout	3	2
By submission	14	2
By decision	1	1
By disqualification	0	1

Res.	Record	Opponent	Method	Event	Date	Round	Time	Location	Notes
Loss	18–6	Vladimir Matyushenko	TKO (punches and elbows)	UFC 122	November 13, 2010	1	2:20	Oberhausen, Germany	
Win	18–5	Walter Mazurkievicz	Submission (kimura)	Jungle Fight 15	October 17, 2009	1	1:10	Rio de Janeiro, Brazil	
Win	17–5	Vagner Curio	Submission (achilles lock)	Jungle Fight 14: Ceará	September 19, 2009	1	0:16	São Paulo, Brazil	Light Heavyweight debut.
Win	16–5	Lew Polley	Submission (guillotine choke)	IFL: Las Vegas	February 29, 2008	1	0:20	Las Vegas, Nevada, United States	
Win	15–5	Fábio Maldonado	Submission (kneebar)	MTL: Final	October 11, 2007	1	0:27	Belém, Brazil	
Win	14–5	Rafael Monteiro	Submission (kimura)	Mo Team League 1	August 11, 2007	1	1:20	Belém, Brazil	
Win	13–5	Branden Lee Hinkle	Submission (heel hook)	GFC: Evolution	May 19, 2007	1	0:37	Columbus, Ohio, United States	
Win	12–5	Rodrigo Gripp de Sousa	Submission (rear-naked choke)	Floripa Fight 4	February 10, 2007	1	4:50	Natal, Brazil	
Loss	11–5	Felipe Arinelli	Decision (unanimous)	Super Challenge 1	October 7, 2006	2	5:00	São Paulo, Brazil	
Win	11–4	Michael Knaap	Submission (armbar)	WCFC: No Guts No Glory	March 18, 2006	1	3:11	Manchester, England	
Win	10–4	Julio Cesar Jamanta	Submission (guillotine choke)	Jungle Fight 5	November 26, 2005	1	0:52	Manaus, Brazil	
Win	9–4	Jose Freitas	Submission (americana)	Fight for Respect 1	October 15, 2005	1	N/A	Lisbon, Portugal	
Loss	8–4	Chris Monson	TKO (exhaustion)	HOOKnSHOOT: Kings 1	November 17, 2001	2	3:00	Evansville, Indiana, United States	
Loss	8–3	Chris Haseman	Submission (guillotine choke)	RINGS: World Title Series 2	June 15, 2001	1	3:03	Rotterdam, Netherlands	
Loss	8–2	Hiromitsu Kanehara	Submission (kimura)	RINGS: King of Kings 2000 Block B	December 22, 2000	2	2:45	Osaka, Japan	
Win	8–1	Kevin Cook	TKO (submission to punches)	WEF: New Blood Conflict	April 24, 2000	1	1:28	Evansville, Indiana, United States	
Win	7–1	Moti Horenstein	Submission (americana)	2 Hot 2 Handle 1	May 2, 2000	1	2:43	Rotterdam, Netherlands	
Win	6–1	Shannon Ritch	Submission (americana)	Amsterdam Absolute Championship 2	November 27, 1999	1	0:48	Amsterdam, Netherlands	
Win	5–1	Bob Schrijber	Submission (rear-naked choke)	World Vale Tudo Championship 9	September 27, 1999	1	2:11	Aruba	WVC 9 Heavyweight Tournament Final.
Win	4–1	Jimmy Westfall	Submission (rear-naked choke)	World Vale Tudo Championship 9	September 27, 1999	1	0:56	Aruba	WVC 9 Heavyweight Tournament Semifinal.
Win	3–1	Heath Herring	Decision (split)	World Vale Tudo Championship 8	July 1, 1999	1	30:00	Aruba	WVC 8 Heavyweight Tournament Final.
Win	2–1	Rodney Glunder	TKO (submission to punches)	World Vale Tudo Championship 8	July 1, 1999	1	1:59	Aruba	WVC 8 Heavyweight Tournament Semifinal.
Win	1–1	Astravroslakis Astravroslakis	TKO (submission to punches)	World Vale Tudo Championship 8	July 1, 1999	1	1:00	Aruba	WVC 8 Heavyweight Tournament Quarterfinal.
Loss	0–1	Tim Catalfo	DQ (eye gouge)	IVC 4: The Battle	July 2, 1998	1	9:19	Manaus, Brazil	

== Submission grappling record ==
KO PUNCHES

Result	Opponent	Method	Event	Date	Round	Time	Notes
Loss	(Brazil) Andre Galvao		ADCC 2007 Absolute	2007	1		
Loss	(Brazil) Marcelo García		ADCC 2007 Absolute	2007	1		
Win	(United States) Tarsis Humphreys		ADCC 2007 Absolute	2007	1		
Win	(Finland) Jannie Pietilainen		ADCC 2007 Absolute	2007	1		
Loss	(Brazil) Braulio Estima		ADCC 2007 –77 kg	2007	1		
Win	(Poland) Radek Turek		ADCC 2007 –77 kg	2007	1		
Win	(United States) Carl Bierman		ADCC 2007 –77 kg	2007	1		
Loss	(Brazil) Ronaldo Souza		ADCC 2005 Absolute	2005	1		
Win	(Brazil) Leo Santos		ADCC 2005 Absolute	2005	1		
Loss	(Brazil) Roger Gracie		ADCC 2005 –99 kg	2005	1		
Win	(Norway) John Olav Einemo		ADCC 2005 –99 kg	2005	1		
Win	(United States) Robert Drysdale		ADCC 2005 –99 kg	2005	1		
Win	(Japan) Yukiya Naito		ADCC 2005 –99 kg	2005	1		
Loss	(United States) Dean Lister		ADCC 2003 Absolute	2003	1		
Win	(Brazil) Fabricio Werdum		ADCC 2003 Absolute	2003	1		
Win	(United States) Andy Reese		ADCC 2003 Absolute	2003	1		
Win	(Brazil) Rodrigo Medeiros		ADCC 2003 Absolute	2003	1		
Loss	(Norway) John Olav Einemo		ADCC 2003 –99 kg	2003	1		
Win	(Brazil) Xande Ribeiro		ADCC 2003 –99 kg	2003	1		
Win	(United States) Chael Sonnen		ADCC 2003 –99 kg	2003	1		
Win	(United States) Anthony Perush		ADCC 2003 –99 kg	2003	1		
Loss	(United States) Ricco Rodriguez		ADCC 2001 Absolute	2001	1		
Win	(Norway) John Olav Einemo		ADCC 2001 –88 kg	2001	1		
Win	(United States) Chael Sonnen		ADCC 2001 –88 kg	2001	1		Guillotine Choke
Win	(United States) Marc Laimon		ADCC 2001 –88 kg	2001	1		
