= UFC on FX: Maynard vs. Guida =

UFC mixed martial arts event in 2012

- The poster for UFC on FX: Maynard vs. Guida
- Promotion: Ultimate Fighting Championship
- Date: June 22, 2012
- Venue: Revel Casino
- City: Atlantic City, New Jersey
- Attendance: 4,652
- Estimated viewers: 1,300,000

Event chronology
UFC on FX: Johnson vs. McCall 2	UFC on FX: Maynard vs. Guida	UFC 147: Silva vs. Franklin 2

UFC on FX: Maynard vs. Guida (also known as UFC on FX 4) was a mixed martial arts event held by the Ultimate Fighting Championship on June 22, 2012 in Revel Casino in Atlantic City, New Jersey.

== Background ==
The main event consists of a five-round, non-championship, bout between Clay Guida and Gray Maynard. This was Guida's first fight since losing to future UFC Lightweight Champion Benson Henderson on November 12, 2011 at UFC on Fox 1. Maynard's previous bout was on October 8, 2011 at UFC 136, against then UFC Lightweight Champion Frankie Edgar.

The event was the seventh that the UFC has hosted in Atlantic City, but the first since UFC 53 in 2005.

Rich Attonito was expected to face Rick Story at the event. However, Attonito was forced out of the bout with an injury and replaced by Papy Abedi. Abedi was also forced out of the fight with an injury and replaced by newcomer Brock Jardine.

Jimy Hettes was expected to face Steven Siler at the event. However, Hettes was forced out of the bout with an injury and replaced by newcomer Joey Gambino.

Matt Riddle was expected to face Luis Ramos in the event. However, Riddle was forced out of the bout with an injury and replaced by Matt Brown.

Edwin Figueroa was expected to face Ken Stone at the event. However, Figueroa was forced out of the bout with an injury and replaced by Francisco Rivera. Rivera was injured as well and was replaced by Dustin Pague, who had just fought and won at UFC on FX: Johnson vs. McCall two weeks before this event.

== Results ==
Main card (FX)
Weight class				Method	Round	Time	Notes
Lightweight	Gray Maynard	def.	Clay Guida	Decision (split) (48–47, 47–48, 48–47)	5	5:00
Lightweight	Sam Stout	def.	Spencer Fisher	Decision (unanimous) (30–27, 30–27, 30–27)	3	5:00
Welterweight	Brian Ebersole	def.	TJ Waldburger	Decision (unanimous) (29–28, 29–28, 29–28)	3	5:00
Featherweight	Cub Swanson	def.	Ross Pearson	TKO (punches)	2	4:14
Preliminary card (Fuel TV)
Featherweight	Ricardo Lamas	def.	Hatsu Hioki	Decision (unanimous) (29–28, 29–28, 29–28)	3	5:00
Catchweight (157)	Ramsey Nijem	def.	C.J. Keith	TKO (punches)	1	2:29	(Note: Keith failed to make the 156 pound lightweight limit, weighing in at 157 pounds.)
Welterweight	Rick Story	def.	Brock Jardine	Decision (unanimous) (30–27, 30–27, 30–27)	3	5:00
Featherweight	Steven Siler	def.	Joey Gambino	Submission (guillotine choke)	1	2:47
Middleweight	Chris Camozzi	def.	Nick Catone	TKO (doctor stoppage)	3	1:51
Welterweight	Matt Brown	def.	Luis Ramos	TKO (knees and punches)	2	4:20
Preliminary card (Facebook)
Welterweight	Dan Miller	def.	Ricardo Funch	Submission (guillotine choke)	3	3:12
Bantamweight	Ken Stone	def.	Dustin Pague	Decision (split) (28–29, 29–28, 29–28)	3	5:00

== Bonus awards ==
The following fighters received $50,000 bonuses.

- Fight of the Night: Sam Stout vs. Spencer Fisher
- Knockout of the Night: Cub Swanson
- Submission of the Night: Dan Miller
