= Matt Brown (fighter) =

American mixed martial artist

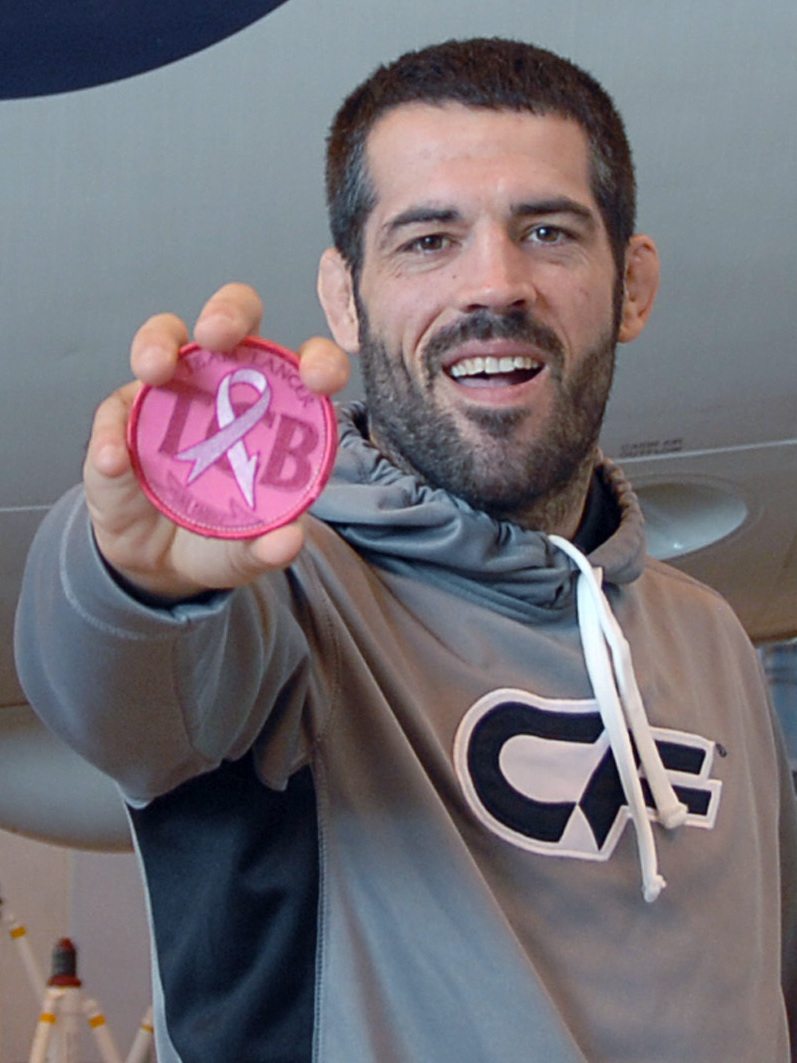
- Brown in 2013
- Born: Matthew Burton Brown; January 10, 1981 (age 45); Jamestown, Ohio, U.S.
- Other names: The Immortal
- Height: 6 ft 0 in (1.83 m)
- Weight: 170 lb (77 kg; 12 st)
- Division: Middleweight; Welterweight
- Reach: 75 in (191 cm)
- Stance: Orthodox
- Fighting out of: Columbus, Ohio, U.S.
- Team: AMC Pankration (2008–2011); Elevation Fight Team (2015–2018); Immortal Martial Arts (2018–present)
- Rank: Brown belt in Brazilian Jiu-Jitsu
- Years active: 2005–2024

Mixed martial arts record
- Total: 43
- Wins: 24
- By knockout: 16
- By submission: 6
- By decision: 2
- Losses: 19
- By knockout: 3
- By submission: 10
- By decision: 6

Other information
- Mixed martial arts record from Sherdog

Matthew Burton Brown (born January 10, 1981) is an American former professional mixed martial artist who competed in the Welterweight division of the Ultimate Fighting Championship (UFC) from 2008 until 2024. Brown gained entry into the UFC after competing on the seventh season of The Ultimate Fighter television series, and had success as a top 5 contender.

At the time of his retirement, Brown held the record for the second highest number of wins by knockout in UFC history with 13.

== Background ==
Brown was born and raised in Jamestown, Ohio. After being home schooled for two years, he attended Greeneview High School, where he struggled to fit in. Living in a small town with no foreseeable future outside of a low paying factory job as a machinist, Brown grew frustrated and turned to drugs and alcohol. For a period, he was addicted to meth, regularly used cocaine and would often get into fights at parties. By his early twenties he had survived a heroin overdose (which led to his nickname "The Immortal"), had been homeless and had been to prison. Brown's interest in MMA started with drunkenly practicing various submission holds that he had seen on VHS tapes featuring Ken Shamrock on friends.

In what started as a cocaine-fueled trip to see his friend fight, Brown signed up to his first fight on a few hours' notice. He purchased a mouth piece from across the road, boiled it in a nearby restaurant and fought his first fight without any training; despite this he ended up winning. Brown fought again in the same night and was beaten badly, losing a decision. His first formal training was at a Japanese jiu-jitsu gym, where he agreed to another fight in two weeks with Muay Thai rules. In what was actually a sanshou match, Brown wound up losing by decision and went to work the same night. He later transitioned to a Jorge Gurgel affiliate, which led him to full MMA training.

== Mixed martial arts career ==
=== Early career ===
After compiling an amateur record of 2–0, Brown made his professional MMA debut in the fall of 2005, winning via submission.

On February 9, 2007, in Kennesaw, Georgia, Matt Brown won the ISCF (International Sport Combat Federation) East Coast Welterweight Championship over Douglas Lima by referee stoppage due to strikes at 2:50 of the second round.

Brown thought his career was over due to money problems, yet The Ultimate Fighter trials came along and he was selected to be on the show. He then began splitting time training with Matt Hume in Seattle, Washington and at Throwdown Training Center in Las Vegas, Nevada.

=== The Ultimate Fighter ===
Brown was chosen as one of the thirty-two fighters to get a chance at a six-figure UFC contract in The Ultimate Fighter: Team Rampage vs. Team Forrest. He officially entered the show after defeating Josh Hall by TKO in the preliminary round. Brown moved on to the quarter-finals by defeating Jeremy May in the first round via head kick KO. He faced eventual winner Amir Sadollah in the quarter-finals but lost by triangle choke in the second round.

=== Ultimate Fighting Championship ===
Brown won his UFC debut at The Ultimate Finale 7 by defeating Matt Arroyo, a season six contestant, via second-round TKO. The fight was a rematch from their 2007 fight, which Brown took on a few hours' notice and also won via TKO.

Brown lost his second fight in the organization by split decision to Korean Dong Hyun Kim at UFC 88. Kim threatened Brown with a rear-naked choke from back control in the first round, but became exhausted in the second round. In the third, Kim used some effective ground-and-pound and cut Brown with an elbow. All three judges scored the bout 29–28, two of them in Kim's favor and one in Brown's favor. The decision was contested by the partisan American crowd in attendance with noticeable booing. Commentator Joe Rogan announced during the post-fight interviews that he believed Brown had won the fight.

After Matthew Riddle sustained a knee injury during training, Brown replaced him at UFC 91 and fought Ryan Thomas. Brown won by armbar in the second round.

Brown next fought at UFC 96 on March 7, 2009, in which he fought Pete Sell. Brown defeated Sell via TKO in the first round.

Brown was scheduled to fight on the TUF 9 Finale card against Anthony Johnson. However, Johnson pulled out of the fight after injuring his knee during practice. The UFC set out to find a replacement for Johnson but Brown pulled out as well, to heal up some nagging injuries.

Brown faced James Wilks at UFC 105, defeating him via TKO in the third round. Brown landed a flying knee during the second round that knocked Wilks to the canvas and in the third round, Brown escaped a near fight ending submission attempt by Wilks to take top position. After obtaining full mount, Brown landed multiple unanswered strikes, causing the referee to stop the fight, awarding Brown his third straight UFC win and taking his overall UFC record to 4–1.

During a radio interview held by MMAWeekly, Brown stated he would like to fight Renzo Gracie for his next fight. Instead, Brown faced Ricardo Almeida on March 27, 2010, at UFC 111. Brown lost the fight by rear-naked choke in the second round.

Brown had a rematch with Chris Lytle on July 3, 2010, at UFC 116. He lost the fight via submission in the second round.

Brown was expected to face Canadian Rory MacDonald on November 20, 2010, at UFC 123. However, MacDonald withdrew from the card with an injury and replaced by Brian Foster, who defeated Brown by submission (guillotine choke) in the second round of their bout. After his third consecutive loss, it was announced on ESPN's "MMA Live" that Brown had been released from the promotion. However, Ariel Helwani announced that Brown had in fact not been released from the UFC, citing his source as the UFC itself.

Brown was expected to face Mark Scanlon on March 3, 2011, at UFC Live: Sanchez vs. Kampmann. However, Scanlon was forced off the card and replaced by Matthew Riddle. Not long after the Riddle-Brown announcement was made, it was announced that Riddle had been pulled from the fight.

Brown was expected to face Rich Attonito on June 26, 2011, at UFC on Versus 4. However, main card participant Martin Kampmann was forced out of his bout with John Howard with an injury and Brown was chosen as his replacement, while Attonito faced Daniel Roberts. Brown won the fight against Howard via unanimous decision (29–28, 29–28, and 29–28).

Brown was expected to face British fighter John Hathaway on November 5, 2011, at UFC 138, replacing an injured Pascal Krauss. However, John Hathaway was forced to pull out of the bout due to an undisclosed injury and Brown was pulled from the event. Instead Brown faced Seth Baczynski on November 19, 2011, at UFC 139. He lost the fight via submission in the second round.

Brown fought Chris Cope on February 4, 2012, at UFC 143. Brown won the fight via TKO in the second round.

Brown fought prospect Stephen Thompson on April 21, 2012, at UFC 145. Brown handed Thompson his first professional loss via unanimous decision (30–27, 29–27, and 30–27).

Brown faced Luis Ramos on June 22, 2012, at UFC on FX: Maynard vs. Guida, replacing an injured Matthew Riddle. Brown earned his third straight victory with a second-round TKO over Ramos.

Brown next faced Mike Swick on December 8, 2012, at UFC on Fox 5. Despite being a slight underdog, Brown dominated on the ground in the first round, threatening with D'arce and triangle chokes. He eventually won the fight via knockout in the second round, capping a 4-0 year for Brown in 2012.

Brown was expected to face Dan Hardy on April 20, 2013, at UFC on Fox 7. However, Hardy was forced out of the bout with an injury and replaced by Jordan Mein. Brown won via TKO due to punches and elbows to the body in the second round, the win also earned him his first Fight of the Night bonus award.

Brown was expected to face Thiago Alves on August 17, 2013, at UFC Fight Night 26. However, Alves pulled out of the bout citing an injury and was replaced by Mike Pyle. Brown won via knockout due to punches in twenty nine seconds of round one. The win also earned Brown his first and only Knockout of the Night bonus award.

Brown was expected to face former WEC Welterweight Champion Carlos Condit on December 14, 2013, at UFC on Fox 9. However, in the week leading up to the event, Brown pulled out of the bout citing a back injury. As a result, Condit was removed from the card as well.

Brown faced Brazilian Erick Silva in his main-event debut at UFC Fight Night 40. After surviving a gruelling start of the first round, in which Silva dropped him with a body kick and almost caught him in a rear-naked choke, Brown came to win the fight via TKO due to punches in the third round. The win also earned Brown an extra $100,000 as he received both a Fight of the Night and a Performance of the Night bonus award.

Brown faced Robbie Lawler in a 5-round Welterweight title eliminator bout on July 26, 2014, at UFC on Fox 12. He lost the bout via unanimous decision. Brown received a bonus award for Fight of the Night.

A bout with Tarec Saffiedine was expected to take place on February 14, 2015, at UFC Fight Night 60. However, it was announced on January 1, 2015, that Saffiedine had pulled out of the bout, citing a groin injury. Subsequently, Brown was pulled from the event altogether.

Brown was then rescheduled to face Johny Hendricks on March 14, 2015, at UFC 185. Hendricks won the one sided fight via unanimous decision.

Brown was briefly linked to a bout with Nate Diaz on July 11, 2015, at UFC 189. However, in mid-April, Brown announced that the pairing had been scrapped. Brown instead faced Tim Means on the card. He won the fight via submission in the first round.

Brown was expected to face Kelvin Gastelum on November 21, 2015, at The Ultimate Fighter Latin America 2 Finale. However, Brown withdrew from the fight in early November citing an ankle injury. He was replaced by Neil Magny.

Brown next faced Demian Maia on May 14, 2016, at UFC 198. He lost the fight via submission in the third round.

As the first fight of his new, eight-fight contract Brown faced Jake Ellenberger on July 30, 2016, at UFC 201. He lost the fight via TKO early in the first round.

A pairing with Tarec Saffiedine was rescheduled and was expected to take place on 30 December 2016 at UFC 207. However, Brown was pulled from the fight on November 11 in favor of a matchup with Donald Cerrone three weeks earlier at UFC 206. He lost the fight via knockout in the third round.

Brown faced Diego Sanchez on November 11, 2017, at UFC Fight Night: Poirier vs. Pettis. Brown connected with a brutal elbow strike that knocked Sanchez out cold, winning the fight by knockout in round one. This win also earned him a Performance of the Night bonus award.

Brown was expected to face Carlos Condit on April 14, 2018, at UFC on Fox 29. However, he was pulled out from the fight due to a torn anterior cruciate ligament (ACL).

After one year rehabilitating his injury from torn ACL, Brown returned to face Ben Saunders on December 14, 2019, at UFC 245. He won the fight via knockout in the second round.

Brown was scheduled to face Miguel Baeza on March 28, 2020, at UFC on ESPN: Ngannou vs. Rozenstruik. Due to the COVID-19 pandemic, the event was eventually postponed and the bout has moved to May 16, 2020, at UFC on ESPN: Overeem vs. Harris. Despite knocking Baeza down in the first round, Brown lost the bout via second-round knockout.

Brown faced Carlos Condit on January 16, 2021, at UFC on ABC 1. He lost the fight via unanimous decision.

Brown faced Dhiego Lima on June 19, 2021, at UFC on ESPN 25. He won the fight by knockout in the second round. This fight earned him the Performance of the Night award.

Brown was scheduled to face Bryan Barberena on December 4, 2021, at UFC on ESPN 31. However, Brown forced out of the bout due to testing positive for COVID-19. The bout against Brown was rescheduled and eventually took place on March 26, 2022, at UFC on ESPN 33. Brown lost the back-and-forth bout via split decision. The fight was awarded the Fight of the Night award.

Brown faced Court McGee at UFC on ABC 4 on May 13, 2023. Brown won the bout via knockout in first round. This win earned him the Performance of the Night award.

On May 4, 2024, Brown announced his retirement from mixed martial arts.

=== Fight Circus ===
In 2024, Brown acted as a referee for The Ultimate Dick Kicking Championships, a crotch kicking competition organized by Full Metal Dojo's Fight Circus in Thailand. Some fans compared the event to Dana White's Power Slap. Brown reposted the footage of the event to his X account and seemingly endorsed groin-kicking over slapfighting by adding the caption: "So much for power slap! "This shit is next level!"

On January 12, 2025, Brown acted as the partner of UFC Hall of Famer Mark Coleman when he returned to the ring and competed at Fight Circus 12 in Phuket, Thailand in a "wheelchair boxing match" against the CEO of the promotion Jon Nutt. Brown was pushing Coleman around the ring, as both fighters were strapped into a wheelchair and were pushed by their cornermen. At the end of the fight, both men stood up from their wheelchairs and Coleman knocked out Nutt at the last second. Brown also competed in the event and fought "Blobtang" in a Muaythai match.

== Personal life ==
Matt Brown is the owner of Immortal Martial Arts Center, and the co-founder and Co-owner of Immortal Coffee.

Before fighting professionally, Brown was a personal trainer.

Brown is an avid heavy metal fan, and was in the crowd when former Pantera guitarist Dimebag Darrell was murdered on stage while performing with his new band Damageplan on December 8, 2004. Brown approached heavy metal vocalist Jamey Jasta of the band Hatebreed to write his UFC entrance theme song. The song, titled "The Immortal", was released on iTunes on March 10, 2015.

Brown also appears on The Great MMA Debate podcast alongside Mark Coleman, Damon Martin, and Jeremy Loper.

On the morning of May 15, 2016, in Curitiba, Brazil, Brown was attacked in public by his former jiu-jitsu coach Rodrigo Botti. The assault began in the hotel lobby where Brown was staying, and escalated outside where it was witnessed by a number of bystanders. The attack was captured on video and Botti was detained by another man until the police arrived at the scene.

After his fight with Jake Ellenberger, Brown recalled having serious post-concussion symptoms, often slurring speech and having trouble with short-term memory. His wife, Colleen Brown, has also stated that Matt's memory is "not as sharp as it once was". He stated he has doubts continuing to fight due to his concussion. Months later he was knocked out by Donald Cerrone via headkick.

Brown's moniker, "The Immortal", was coined by his friends after his drug overdose and near death experience.

I came really close to dying," Brown said. "I [overdosed] on heroin. … They said I was clinically dead for over a minute. I was in that mindset that there was nothing else to do. I could get drunk everyday and I'll still be (stuck) here, or I could go to college and I'll still be (stuck) here. [Overdosing] was one of the best things to happen to me. When that happened it woke me up and I was like, 'Man, I got to do something. My friends were like, 'Man, you are [expletive] immortal, huh?' And I thought, 'If I could beat all of that stuff, I could beat anything.

== Championships and accomplishments ==
- Ultimate Fighting Championship
  - Fight of the Night (Four Times) vs. Jordan Mein, Erick Silva, Robbie Lawler, and Bryan Barberena
  - Knockout of the Night (One time) vs. Mike Pyle
  - Performance of the Night (Four times) vs. Erick Silva, Diego Sanchez, Dhiego Lima, and Court McGee
    - Tied (Vicente Luque & Stephen Thompson) for second most Post-Fight bonuses in UFC Welterweight division history (9) (behind Chris Lytle)
  - Most knockouts in UFC Welterweight division history (13)
    - Second most knockouts in UFC history (13) (behind Derrick Lewis)
  - Most finishes in UFC Welterweight division history (15)
    - Tied (Dustin Poirier, Vicente Luque & Max Holloway) for fifth most finishes in UFC history (15)
  - Second most bouts in UFC Welterweight division history (30) (behind Neil Magny)
  - Third most wins in UFC Welterweight division history (17)
  - Tied (Jake Ellenberger & Stephen Thompson) for third most knockdowns landed in UFC Welterweight division history (11)
  - Tied for fourth most consecutive knockouts in UFC history (5)
  - UFC.com Awards
    - 2012: Ranked #4 Fighter of the Year & Ranked #8 Upset of the Year vs. Mike Swick
    - 2014: Ranked #4 Fight of the Year vs. Erick Silva & Ranked #7 Fight of the Year vs. Robbie Lawler
    - 2016: Ranked #8 Fight of the Year vs. Donald Cerrone
    - 2017: Ranked #4 Knockout of the Year vs. Diego Sanchez
- International Sport Combat Federation
  - ISCF East Coast Welterweight Championship (one time)
- MMA Junkie
  - 2014 May Fight of the Month vs. Erick Silva
- MMA Fighting
  - 2012 #4 Ranked Fighter of the Year
- Sherdog
  - 2012 All-Violence First Team
  - 2013 All-Violence First Team
- Bloody Elbow
  - 2012 Fighter of the Year
  - 2017 Knockout of the Year vs. Diego Sanchez at UFC Fight Night 120
- Bleacher Report
  - 2014 #4 Ranked Fight of the Year vs. Robbie Lawler at UFC on Fox: Lawler vs. Brown
  - 2014 #6 Ranked Fight of the Year vs. Erick Silva

== Mixed martial arts record ==
Professional record breakdown
43 matches	24 wins	19 losses
By knockout	16	3
By submission	6	10
By decision	2	6

Res.	Record	Opponent	Method	Event	Date	Round	Time	Location	Notes
Win	24–19	Court McGee	KO (punch)	UFC on ABC: Rozenstruik vs. Almeida	May 13, 2023	1	4:09	Charlotte, North Carolina, United States	Performance of the Night.
Loss	23–19	Bryan Barberena	Decision (split)	UFC on ESPN: Blaydes vs. Daukaus	March 26, 2022	3	5:00	Columbus, Ohio, United States	Fight of the Night.
Win	23–18	Dhiego Lima	KO (punch)	UFC on ESPN: The Korean Zombie vs. Ige	June 19, 2021	2	3:02	Las Vegas, Nevada, United States	Performance of the Night.
Loss	22–18	Carlos Condit	Decision (unanimous)	UFC on ABC: Holloway vs. Kattar	January 16, 2021	3	5:00	Abu Dhabi, United Arab Emirates	
Loss	22–17	Miguel Baeza	TKO (punches)	UFC on ESPN: Overeem vs. Harris	May 16, 2020	2	0:18	Jacksonville, Florida, United States	
Win	22–16	Ben Saunders	KO (elbows and punches)	UFC 245	December 14, 2019	2	4:55	Las Vegas, Nevada, United States	
Win	21–16	Diego Sanchez	KO (elbow)	UFC Fight Night: Poirier vs. Pettis	November 11, 2017	1	3:44	Norfolk, Virginia, United States	Performance of the Night.
Loss	20–16	Donald Cerrone	KO (head kick)	UFC 206	December 10, 2016	3	0:44	Toronto, Ontario, Canada	
Loss	20–15	Jake Ellenberger	TKO (kick to the body and punches)	UFC 201	July 30, 2016	1	1:46	Atlanta, Georgia, United States	
Loss	20–14	Demian Maia	Submission (rear-naked choke)	UFC 198	May 14, 2016	3	4:31	Curitiba, Brazil	
Win	20–13	Tim Means	Submission (guillotine choke)	UFC 189	July 11, 2015	1	4:44	Las Vegas, Nevada, United States	
Loss	19–13	Johny Hendricks	Decision (unanimous)	UFC 185	March 14, 2015	3	5:00	Dallas, Texas, United States	
Loss	19–12	Robbie Lawler	Decision (unanimous)	UFC on Fox: Lawler vs. Brown	July 26, 2014	5	5:00	San Jose, California, United States	UFC Welterweight title eliminator; Brown missed weight (172.5 lb). Fight of the Night.
Win	19–11	Erick Silva	TKO (punches)	UFC Fight Night: Brown vs. Silva	May 10, 2014	3	2:11	Cincinnati, Ohio, United States	Performance of the Night. Fight of the Night
Win	18–11	Mike Pyle	KO (punches)	UFC Fight Night: Shogun vs. Sonnen	August 17, 2013	1	0:29	Boston, Massachusetts, United States	Knockout of the Night.
Win	17–11	Jordan Mein	TKO (elbows)	UFC on Fox: Henderson vs. Melendez	April 20, 2013	2	1:00	San Jose, California, United States	Fight of the Night.
Win	16–11	Mike Swick	KO (punches)	UFC on Fox: Henderson vs. Diaz	December 8, 2012	2	2:31	Seattle, Washington, United States	
Win	15–11	Luis Ramos	TKO (knees and punches)	UFC on FX: Maynard vs. Guida	June 22, 2012	2	4:20	Atlantic City, New Jersey, United States	
Win	14–11	Stephen Thompson	Decision (unanimous)	UFC 145	April 21, 2012	3	5:00	Atlanta, Georgia, United States	
Win	13–11	Chris Cope	TKO (punches)	UFC 143	February 4, 2012	2	1:19	Las Vegas, Nevada, United States	
Loss	12–11	Seth Baczynski	Submission (guillotine choke)	UFC 139	November 19, 2011	2	0:42	San Jose, California, United States	
Win	12–10	John Howard	Decision (unanimous)	UFC Live: Kongo vs. Barry	June 26, 2011	3	5:00	Pittsburgh, Pennsylvania, United States	
Loss	11–10	Brian Foster	Submission (guillotine choke)	UFC 123	November 20, 2010	2	2:11	Auburn Hills, Michigan, United States	
Loss	11–9	Chris Lytle	Submission (straight armbar)	UFC 116	July 3, 2010	2	2:02	Las Vegas, Nevada, United States	
Loss	11–8	Ricardo Almeida	Submission (rear-naked choke)	UFC 111	March 27, 2010	2	3:30	Newark, New Jersey, United States	
Win	11–7	James Wilks	TKO (punches)	UFC 105	November 14, 2009	3	2:27	Manchester, England	
Win	10–7	Pete Sell	TKO (punches)	UFC 96	March 7, 2009	1	1:32	Columbus, Ohio, United States	
Win	9–7	Ryan Thomas	Submission (armbar)	UFC 91	November 15, 2008	2	0:57	Las Vegas, Nevada, United States	
Loss	8–7	Dong Hyun Kim	Decision (split)	UFC 88	September 6, 2008	3	5:00	Atlanta, Georgia, United States	
Win	8–6	Matt Arroyo	TKO (punches)	The Ultimate Fighter 7 Finale	June 21, 2008	2	3:40	Las Vegas, Nevada, United States	
Loss	7–6	Chris Lytle	Submission (guillotine choke)	United Fight League: Fight Night at Conseco Fieldhouse	August 11, 2007	2	2:49	Indianapolis, Indiana, United States	
Win	7–5	Dan Kolbasowski	Submission (armbar)	FightFest: Black and Blues Tour	July 6, 2007	1	1:37	Cleveland, Ohio, United States	
Loss	6–5	Daniel Moraes	Submission (armbar)	Gracie FC: Evolution	May 19, 2007	1	2:32	Columbus, Ohio, United States	
Loss	6–4	Jesse Chilton	Submission (arm-triangle choke)	Next Level Fighting 8	March 10, 2007	3	3:23	Steubenville, Ohio, United States	
Win	6–3	Douglas Lima	TKO (punches)	International Sport Combat Federation: Invasion	February 9, 2007	2	2:50	Kennesaw, Georgia, United States	Won the vacant ISCF East Coast Welterweight Championship.
Win	5–3	Matt Arroyo	TKO (punches)	Real FC 7	November 4, 2006	2	2:50	Tampa, Florida, United States	
Win	4–3	Jason Nickoson	Submission (triangle choke)	Fightfest 8	October 20, 2006	1	0:51	Cleveland, Ohio, United States	
Loss	3–3	Chris Liguori	Submission (rear-naked choke)	Combat in the Cage: Marked Territory	September 30, 2006	2	0:42	Lincroft, New Jersey, United States	For the vacant CITC Welterweight Championship.
Loss	3–2	Mikey Gomez	Submission (rear-naked choke)	Absolute FC 17	June 24, 2006	1	3:35	Boca Raton, Florida, United States	
Win	3–1	Brian King	Submission (armbar)	Broken Reflection 1	May 20, 2006	1	3:27	Toledo, Ohio, United States	
Loss	2–1	Pete Spratt	Decision (unanimous)	International Freestyle Fighting 1	May 6, 2006	3	5:00	Fort Worth, Texas, United States	
Win	2–0	Joey Whitt	KO (punches)	Gracie Fighting League: Brawl at the Buckeye	February 10, 2006	1	0:39	Columbus, Ohio, United States	
Win	1–0	Ricardo Martinez	Submission (neck crank)	Higher Power Fighting 1	October 8, 2005	1	2:54	Lancaster, Ohio, United States	Welterweight debut.

=== Mixed martial arts exhibition record ===
Exhibition record breakdown		
3 matches	2 wins	1 loss
By knockout	2	0
By submission	0	1
By decision	0	0

Res.	Record	Opponent	Method	Event	Date	Round	Time	Location	Notes
Loss	2–1	Amir Sadollah	Submission (triangle choke)	The Ultimate Fighter: Team Rampage vs. Team Forrest	May 28, 2008 (airdate)	2	4:09	Las Vegas, Nevada, United States	Eliminated.
Win	2–0	Jeremy May	KO (head kick)	The Ultimate Fighter: Team Rampage vs. Team Forrest	May 7, 2008 (airdate)	1	3:35	Las Vegas, Nevada, United States	Advanced to Quarterfinals.
Win	1–0	Josh Hall	TKO (punches)	The Ultimate Fighter: Team Rampage vs. Team Forrest	April 9, 2008 (airdate)	1	4:58	Las Vegas, Nevada, United States	Preliminary round.

== See also ==
- List of current UFC fighters
- List of male mixed martial artists
