= UFC 131 =

UFC mixed martial arts event in 2011

UFC 131: dos Santos vs. Carwin
- The poster for UFC 131: dos Santos vs. Carwin
- Promotion: Ultimate Fighting Championship
- Date: June 11, 2011
- Venue: Rogers Arena
- City: Vancouver, British Columbia, Canada
- Attendance: 14,685
- Total gate: $2,800,000
- Buyrate: 330,000

Event chronology
The Ultimate Fighter: Team Lesnar vs. Team dos Santos Finale	UFC 131: dos Santos vs. Carwin	UFC Live: Kongo vs. Barry

UFC 131: dos Santos vs. Carwin was a mixed martial arts event held by the Ultimate Fighting Championship on June 11, 2011, at the Rogers Arena in Vancouver, British Columbia, Canada.

== Background ==
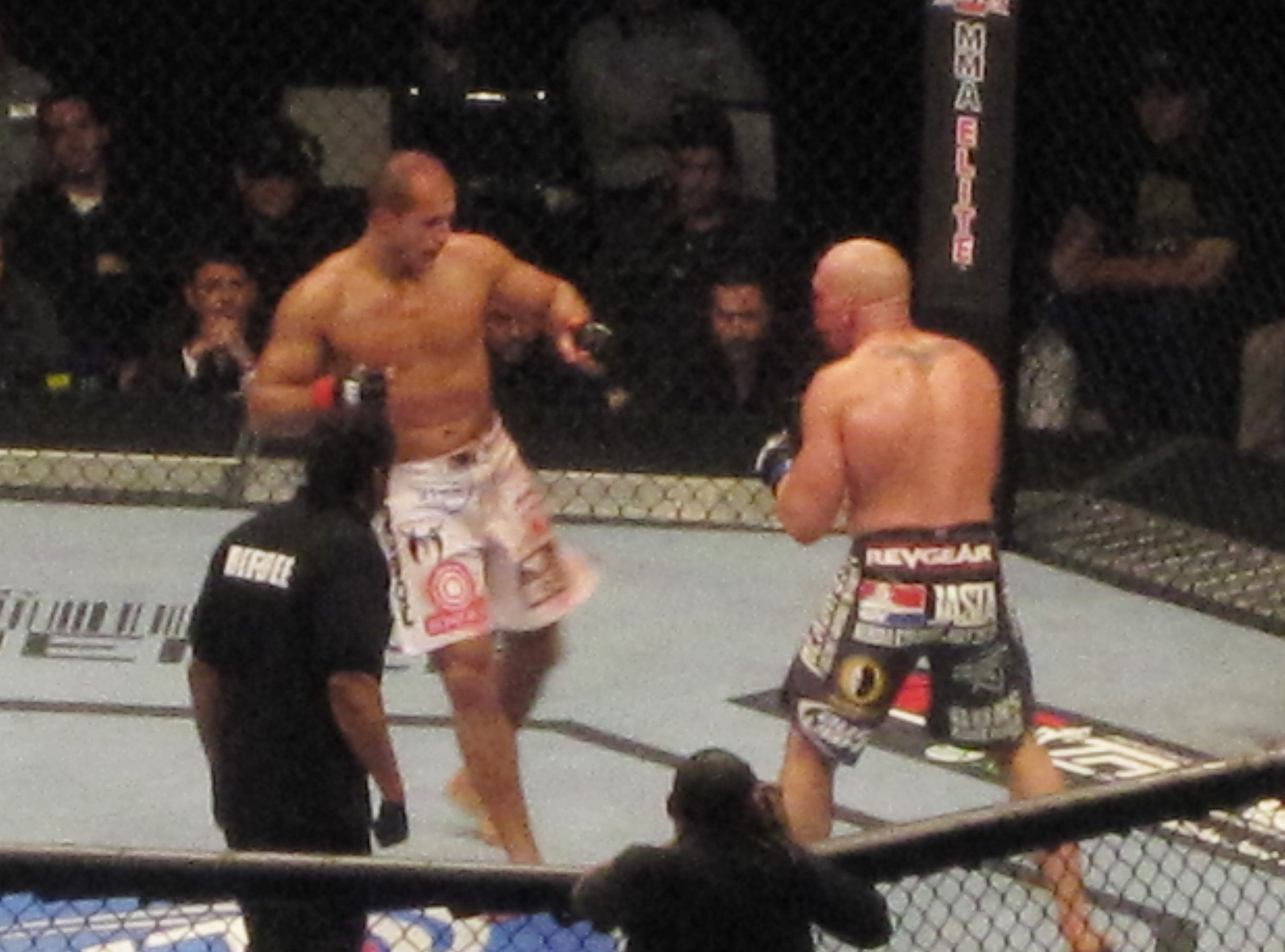
Junior dos Santos fought Shane Carwin in the main event of UFC 131.

Brock Lesnar was originally scheduled to face Junior dos Santos after their coaching stint on The Ultimate Fighter 13, but due to a recurring illness, Lesnar was replaced by Shane Carwin. Originally, a matchup between Carwin, and Jon Olav Einemo was scheduled for this event. Einemo remained on the card and faced Dave Herman, who was pulled from a matchup with Joey Beltran as a result. Beltran was matched up with Aaron Rosa.

Court McGee was scheduled to fight Jesse Bongfeldt, but was forced to pull out due to a torn MCL while training and was replaced by Chris Weidman

Rani Yahya was scheduled face Dustin Poirier at this event, but withdrew due to injury on 3 May 2011 and was replaced by UFC newcomer Jason Young.

Anthony Perosh was expected to face Krzysztof Soszynski at this event, but Perosh was forced from the bout with an injury and replaced by Igor Pokrajac. However, Pokrajac was forced to pull out of the bout due to injuries just days before the event and was replaced by Mike Massenzio. The Soszynski/Pokrajac bout was later rescheduled for UFC 140, where Pokrajac won by knockout.

On 17 May a torn muscle forced Mac Danzig out of his bout with Donald Cerrone. Promotional newcomer Vagner Rocha replaced Danzig.

UFC newcomer Dave Herman was originally slated to face Rob Broughton at this event, but Broughton was later replaced by Joey Beltran, who was later replaced with John Olav Einemo since Carwin replaced an injured Lesnar.

UFC 131 featured two preliminary fights live on Spike TV, and the remainder of the preliminary bouts streamed on Facebook and YouTube.

== Results ==
Main card
Weight class				Method	Round	Time	Notes
Heavyweight	Junior dos Santos	def.	Shane Carwin	Decision (unanimous) (30–27, 30–27, 30–26)	3	5:00
Featherweight	Kenny Florian	def.	Diego Nunes	Decision (unanimous) (29–28, 29–28, 30–27)	3	5:00
Middleweight	Mark Muñoz	def.	Demian Maia	Decision (unanimous) (29–28, 29–28, 30–27)	3	5:00
Heavyweight	Dave Herman	def.	John-Olav Einemo	TKO (knee and punches)	2	3:19
Lightweight	Donald Cerrone	def.	Vagner Rocha	Decision (unanimous) (30–27, 30–27, 30–26)	3	5:00
Preliminary card (Spike TV)
Lightweight	Sam Stout	def.	Yves Edwards	KO (punch)	1	3:52	(Note: This bout aired on the broadcast following the dos Santos vs Carwin bout.)
Middleweight	Chris Weidman	def.	Jesse Bongfeldt	Submission (guillotine choke)	1	4:54
Preliminary card (Facebook)
Light Heavyweight	Krzysztof Soszynski	def.	Mike Massenzio	Decision (unanimous) (30–27, 30–26, 30–27)	3	5:00
Middleweight	Nick Ring	def.	James Head	Submission (rear-naked choke)	3	3:33
Featherweight	Dustin Poirier	def.	Jason Young	Decision (unanimous) (30–27, 30–27, 29–28)	3	5:00
Heavyweight	Joey Beltran	def.	Aaron Rosa	TKO (punches)	3	1:26
Featherweight	Darren Elkins	def.	Michihiro Omigawa	Decision (unanimous) (29–28, 29–28, 30–27)	3	5:00

== Bonus awards ==
The following fighters received $70,000 bonuses.

- Fight of the Night: Dave Herman vs. Jon Olav Einemo
- Knockout of the Night: Sam Stout
- Submission of the Night: Chris Weidman

== Reported payout ==
The following is the reported payout to the fighters as reported to the Vancouver Athletic Commission. It does not include sponsor money or "locker room" bonuses often given by the UFC and also do not include the UFC's traditional "fight night" bonuses.

- Junior dos Santos: $200,000 ($100,000 win bonus) def. Shane Carwin: $40,000
- Kenny Florian: $130,000 ($65,000 win bonus) def. Diego Nunes: $12,000
- Mark Muñoz: $60,000 ($30,000 win bonus) def. Demian Maia: $43,000
- Dave Herman: $36,000 ($18,000 win bonus) def. Jon Olav Einemo: $15,000
- Donald Cerrone: $40,000 ($20,000 win bonus) def. Wagner Rocha: $6,000
- Sam Stout: $38,000 ($19,000 win bonus) def. Yves Edwards: $12,000
- Chris Weidman: $20,000 ($10,000 win bonus) def. Jesse Bongfeldt: $6,000
- Krzysztof Soszynski: $24,000 ($12,000 win bonus) def. Mike Massenzio: $8,000
- Nick Ring: $16,000 ($8,000 win bonus) def. James Head: $6,000
- Dustin Poirier: $10,000 ($5,000 win bonus) def. Jason Young: $6,000
- Joey Beltran: $24,000 ($12,000 win bonus) def. Aaron Rosa: $6,000
- Darren Elkins: $16,000 ($8,000 win bonus) def. Michihiro Omigawa: $8,000 ^

^Although not reflected in the Vancouver Athletic Commission paperwork, both Elkins and Omigawa received win bonuses
