= Terry Etim =

English mixed martial arts fighter

- Born: Terence Lee Etim; 11 January 1986 (age 40); Liverpool, England
- Nationality: English
- Height: 6 ft 1 in (1.85 m)
- Weight: 155 lb (70 kg; 11.1 st)
- Division: Lightweight
- Reach: 73 in (190 cm)
- Style: Luta Livre
- Stance: Orthodox
- Team: Team Kaobon/RFT
- Rank: Brown belt in Luta Livre under Marcelo Brigadeiro
- Years active: 2005–2014 (MMA)

Mixed martial arts record
- Total: 21
- Wins: 16
- By knockout: 2
- By submission: 12
- By decision: 2
- Losses: 5
- By knockout: 1
- By submission: 1
- By decision: 3

Other information
- Mixed martial arts record from Sherdog

Terence Lee "Terry" Etim (born 11 January 1986) is a retired English mixed martial artist who competed as a lightweight. He is trained by Shyam Sundar and Reddy Sai Naren. Etim is a brown belt in Luta Livre under Marcelo Brigadeiro.

== Mixed martial arts career ==
=== Early career ===
Terry became the Cage Gladiators Lightweight Champion by defeating Greg Loughran via rear naked choke in the second round and successfully defended his title against Sami Berik, again winning in the second round via armbar.

Etim's fight with Spain's Diego Gonzalez was refereed by former boxing World Heavyweight Champion Mike Tyson, during the World Cage Fighting Championships at the MEN Arena in Manchester, England in March 2006. Etim won the fight via triangle choke in the first round.

=== Ultimate Fighting Championship ===
Etim trained with Pride veteran Luciano Azevedo in Brazil in preparation for his UFC debut fight against Matt Grice at UFC 70 in Manchester. After an opening flurry that rocked Grice, Etim jumped in with a flying knee that was blocked and caused him to fall to the canvas. From there, Grice worked his ground-and-pound attack, but once the fight was stood up, Etim turned the tables and locked in a standing guillotine. Etim dragged Grice down to the ground whilst in the guillotine. But this allowed Grice to escape briefly, before Etim got Grice in another guillotine choke. Grice fell unconscious in the choke and referee Steve Mazzagatti called the fight with 12 seconds left of the opening round.

Etim was defeated at UFC 75 by Gleison Tibau via unanimous decision. Etim was controlled on the ground by Tibau for the length of the fight, eliciting boos from the English crowd.

In his next fight, Etim received his second career loss and his second loss in a row against veteran fighter Rich Clementi at UFC 84 in a similar manner.

Etim snapped his two fight losing streak with a one-sided unanimous decision victory over Sam Stout at UFC 89 in Birmingham, England. Combining precise kicks with fast hands and a precise jab, Etim controlled Stout through the duration of the fight, only having to fend off sporadic and often desperate bursts from the Canadian in reply.

Terry posted his second win in as many fights, as he stopped former Palace Fighting Championship lightweight titleholder Brian Cobb via TKO in the second round. The defeat snapped Cobb's nine-fight winning streak. Etim appeared to win the first round, using leg kicks effectively. When the fight went to the ground Cobb failed to score points, as Etim avoided damage on the ground. Early in round two Etim dropped Cobb with a head kick before finishing the fight with punches, forcing the referee to stop the fight.

Terry survived a first-round knockdown and broken nose to defeat Justin Buchholz at UFC 99 via D'Arce choke in the second round. Etim collected $60,000 for Submission of the Night. Buchholz and Etim traded heavy kicks and punches for the first few minutes in the bout before the American landed a hard right hand which broke Etim's nose. Buchholz pounced but Etim was able to survive the round. Etim went back to his measured gameplan in round two, landing with some hard leg kicks, before hurting Buchholz with multiple knees from the clinch. A scramble ensued before the fight went to the mat, enabling Etim to lock in the D'Arce choke to finish the fight.

Etim won his third Submission of the Night award after defeating Shannon Gugerty on 14 November 2009 at UFC 105 by submission due to a guillotine choke at 1:24 of the second round.

Etim fought BJJ black belt Rafael dos Anjos on 10 April 2010 at UFC 112. After a back and forth first round, where Etim almost submitted dos Anjos with a guillotine choke, he succumbed to the Brazilian's grappling skills in the second, tapping out to an armbar.

Etim was expected to face Joe Lauzon on 28 August 2010 at UFC 118, but was forced off the card with an injury and replaced by Gabe Ruediger.

Etim gave an announcement on 23 June 2011 in an interview on mma-weekly stating that after a year healing from a broken rib injury he will be fighting soon. He said: "as soon as I get a date I will fight."

Etim fought Edward Faaloloto on 5 November 2011 at UFC 138 Etim showed his superior ground skills as he submitted Faaloloto with a guillotine choke 17 seconds into the fight, earning his fourth career Submission of the Night award (tying the UFC's all-time mark).

Etim faced Edson Barboza on 14 January 2012 at UFC 142. The two fought at a steady pace during the match with Barboza throwing more strikes while Etim went for takedowns. Etim was then knocked out in the third round by a spinning wheel kick. Both participants earned Fight of the Night honors for their performances.

Etim was expected to face Joe Lauzon on 4 August 2012 at UFC on Fox 4. However, Etim was forced out of the bout with an injury and replaced by Jamie Varner.

After a thirteen-month layoff, Etim returned to face Renée Forte on 16 February 2013 at UFC on Fuel TV: Barão vs. McDonald. Etim lost the fight via unanimous decision and was subsequently released from the promotion.

=== Bellator MMA ===
Following his exit from the UFC, Etim signed with Bellator, originally set to debut on the promotion's first ever PPV event. He eventually faced Patrick Cenoble on the Spike TV at Bellator 109 on 22 November 2013. He won the fight via unanimous decision (30–27, 29–28, and 30–26). In 2014 he was due to take part in a Bellator lightweight tourney but was forced out after injuring his ACL.

== Personal life ==
In February 2017, Etim was reported to have thrown himself into oncoming traffic while running amok in Liverpool.

== Championships and accomplishments ==
- Ultimate Fighting Championship
  - Fight of the Night (One time) vs. Edson Barboza
  - Submission of the Night (Four times) vs. Matt Grice, Justin Buchholz, Shannon Gugerty, and Edward Faaloloto
  - UFC.com Awards
    - 2009: Submission of the Year vs. Justin Buchholz
    - 2011: Ranked #9 Submission of the Year vs. Edward Faaloloto

== Mixed martial arts record ==
Professional record breakdown
21 matches	16 wins	5 losses
By knockout	2	1
By submission	12	1
By decision	2	3

Res.	Record	Opponent	Method	Event	Date	Round	Time	Location	Notes
Win	16–5	Patrick Cenoble	Decision (unanimous)	Bellator 109	22 November 2013	3	5:00	Bethlehem, Pennsylvania, United States	
Loss	15–5	Renée Forte	Decision (unanimous)	UFC on Fuel TV: Barão vs. McDonald	16 February 2013	3	5:00	London, England	
Loss	15–4	Edson Barboza	KO (wheel kick)	UFC 142	14 January 2012	3	2:02	Rio de Janeiro, Brazil	Fight of the Night.
Win	15–3	Edward Faaloloto	Submission (guillotine choke)	UFC 138	5 November 2011	1	0:17	Birmingham, England	Submission of the Night.
Loss	14–3	Rafael dos Anjos	Submission (armbar)	UFC 112	10 April 2010	2	4:30	Abu Dhabi, United Arab Emirates	
Win	14–2	Shannon Gugerty	Submission (guillotine choke)	UFC 105	14 November 2009	2	1:24	Manchester, England	Submission of the Night.
Win	13–2	Justin Buchholz	Submission (D'Arce choke)	UFC 99	13 June 2009	2	2:38	Cologne, Germany	Submission of the Night. Submission of the Year.
Win	12–2	Brian Cobb	TKO (head kick and punches)	UFC 95	20 February 2009	2	0:10	London, England	
Win	11–2	Sam Stout	Decision (unanimous)	UFC 89	18 October 2008	3	5:00	Birmingham, England	
Loss	10–2	Rich Clementi	Decision (unanimous)	UFC 84	24 May 2008	3	5:00	Las Vegas, Nevada, United States	
Loss	10–1	Gleison Tibau	Decision (unanimous)	UFC 75	8 September 2007	3	5:00	London, England	
Win	10–0	Matt Grice	Technical Submission (guillotine choke)	UFC 70	21 April 2007	1	4:38	Manchester, England	Submission of the Night.
Win	9–0	Sami Berik	Submission (armbar)	Cage Gladiators 3	3 December 2006	2	1:24	Liverpool, England	
Win	8–0	Edgars Podnieks	Submission (rear-naked choke)	RTT: Road to Tokyo	15 October 2006	1	0:46	Wolverhampton, England	
Win	7–0	Greg Loughran	Submission (rear-naked choke)	CG II: The Next Generation	3 September 2006	2	2:50	Liverpool, England	
Win	6–0	Danny van Bergen	Submission (armbar)	Cage Gladiators 1	22 May 2006	1	0:50	Liverpool, England	
Win	5–0	Diego Conejo	Submission (triangle choke)	WCFC: No Guts No Glory	18 March 2006	1	0:59	Manchester, England	
Win	4–0	Kamel Nacer	Submission (triangle choke)	CFC 6: Cage Carnage	4 December 2005	1	N/A	Liverpool, England	
Win	3–0	Aaron Blackwell	Submission (guillotine choke)	CFC 5: Cage Carnage	4 September 2005	1	0:58	Liverpool, England	
Win	2–0	Neil Barber	KO (head kick)	CFC 4: Cage Carnage	3 July 2005	2	1:55	Liverpool, England	
Win	1–0	Kris Leverton	Submission (triangle choke)	Ultimate Ring Fighting	12 May 2005	1	N/A	Stockport, England	
