= Luis Ramos (fighter) =

Brazilian mixed martial artist

- Born: January 18, 1981 (age 45); Rio de Janeiro, Brazil
- Other names: Beição
- Nationality: Brazilian
- Height: 5 ft 8 in (1.73 m)
- Weight: 170 lb (77 kg; 12 st)
- Division: Welterweight
- Reach: 72.0 in (183 cm)
- Fighting out of: Rio de Janeiro, Brazil
- Team: Nova União
- Years active: 2001; 2003-2016

Mixed martial arts record
- Total: 32
- Wins: 20
- By knockout: 4
- By submission: 4
- By decision: 12
- Losses: 10
- By knockout: 4
- By decision: 6
- Draws: 2

Other information
- Mixed martial arts record from Sherdog

Luis Ramos (born January 18, 1981) is a Brazilian mixed martial artist who last competed in 2016. A professional since 2000, he competed for the UFC and DEEP.

== Mixed martial arts career ==
=== Shooto Brazil ===
Ramos compiled an undefeated record in Shooto Brazil and won his first title against Igor Fernandes in 2009. One year later he won the Brazilian Shooto 168 lb Championship.

Ramos later vacated his title to compete in the Ultimate Fighting Championship.

=== Ultimate Fighting Championship ===
Ramos made his UFC debut replacing the injured Mike Swick against Erick Silva on August 27, 2011 at UFC 134: Silva vs. Okami. He lost the bout via TKO in the first round.

Ramos was expected to face Matthew Riddle on December 30, 2011 at UFC 141: Lesnar vs. Overeem. However, the fight was called off as Riddle became ill and had to pull out just moments before the fight took place.

Ramos/Riddle was expected to finally take place on June 22, 2012 at UFC on FX 4: Maynard vs. Guida. However, Riddle was forced out of the bout due to injury and was replaced by Matt Brown. Ramos lost via TKO in the second round and was subsequently released from the promotion.

=== Road Fighting Championship ===
Ramos made his debut on April 13, 2013 at Road FC 11 against Jung Hwan Cha. The bout ended in a draw.

== Championships and accomplishments ==
=== Mixed martial arts ===
- Shooto Brazil
  - Shooto South American Middleweight (168 lb) Championship (2009)
- Watch Out Combat Show
  - Watch Out Combat Show 11 Welterweight Grand Prix Winner (2011)

== Mixed martial arts record ==
Professional record breakdown
32 matches	20 wins	10 losses
By knockout	4	4
By submission	4	0
By decision	12	6
Draws	2	

Res.	Record	Opponent	Method	Event	Date	Round	Time	Location	Notes
Loss	20–10–2	David Bielkheden	TKO (punches)	Superior Challenge 14: Stockholm	October 8, 2016	3	2:13	Stockholm, Sweden	
Loss	20–9–2	Joilton Santos	Decision (split)	Shooto Brazil 58: Fight for BOPE 5	October 18, 2015	3	5:00	Rio de Janeiro, Brazil	
Draw	20–8–2	Hoon Kim	Draw (majority)	Road FC 18	August 30, 2014	3	5:00	Seoul, South Korea	
Draw	20–8–1	Jung Hwan Cha	Draw	Road FC 11	April 13, 2013	3	5:00	Seoul, South Korea	
Win	20–8	Silmar Nunes	Decision (unanimous)	Web Fight Combat	January 27, 2013	3	5:00	Rio de Janeiro, Brazil	
Loss	19–8	Matt Brown	TKO (knees and punches)	UFC on FX: Maynard vs. Guida	June 22, 2012	2	4:20	Atlantic City, New Jersey, United States	
Loss	19–7	Erick Silva	KO (punches)	UFC 134: Silva vs. Okami	August 27, 2011	1	0:40	Rio de Janeiro, Brazil	
Win	19–6	Dimitri Burgo	Submission (arm-triangle choke)	Watch Out Combat Show 14	July 23, 2011	1	2:13	Rio de Janeiro, Brazil	
Win	18–6	Mauro Chimento Jr.	TKO (retirement)	Watch Out Combat Show 11	April 29, 2011	2	5:00	Campo Grande, Mato Grosso do Sul, Brazil	Won WOCS 11 Welterweight Grand Prix.
Win	17–6	Edval Pedroso	Decision (unanimous)	Watch Out Combat Show 11	April 29, 2011	3	5:00	Campo Grande, Mato Grosso do Sul, Brazil	
Loss	16–6	Roan Carneiro	Decision (unanimous)	United Glory: 2010-2011 World Series Quarterfinals	October 16, 2010	3	5:00	Amsterdam, Netherlands	
Win	16–5	Igor Fernandes	Decision (unanimous)	Shooto Brazil 17	August 6, 2010	3	5:00	Rio de Janeiro, Brazil	Won Shooto Brazil 168 lb Championship.
Win	15–5	Marcelo Brito	Decision (unanimous)	Power Fight Extreme	November 7, 2009	3	5:00	Curitiba, Paraná, Brazil	
Win	14–5	Igor Fernandes	Decision (unanimous)	Shooto Brazil 13	August 27, 2009	3	5:00	Fortaleza, Ceará, Brazil	Won Shooto South American Middleweight (168 lb) Championship.
Loss	13–5	Pedro Irie	KO (punch)	Max Fight 6	June 20, 2009	1	0:50	Campinas, São Paulo, Brazil	
Win	13–4	Igor Fernandes	TKO (punches)	Shooto Brazil 12	May 30, 2009	2	3:18	Rio de Janeiro, Brazil	
Win	12–4	Rodrigo Freitas	TKO (corner stoppage)	Shooto Brazil 10	January 17, 2009	2	5:00	Rio de Janeiro, Brazil	
Win	11–4	Carlos Galvão	Decision (unanimous)	Max Fight 5	August 23, 2008	3	5:00	Campinas, São Paulo, Brazil	
Win	10–4	Julio César de Almeida	Decision (unanimous)	Rio FC 1	February 28, 2008	3	N/A	Rio de Janeiro, Brazil	
Loss	9–4	Luiz Dutra Jr.	Decision (unanimous)	Cassino Fight 4	September 15, 2007	3	5:00	Manaus, Amazonas, Brazil	
Win	9–3	Luciano Azevedo	Decision (unanimous)	Top Fighting Championships 3	May 2, 2007	3	5:00	Rio de Janeiro, Brazil	
Loss	8–3	Luciano Azevedo	Decision (unanimous)	Super Challenge 1	October 7, 2006	2	5:00	Barueri, São Paulo, Brazil	
Win	8–2	Maurício Reis	Decision	Top Fighter MMA	August 2, 2006	3	N/A	Rio de Janeiro, Brazil	
Win	7–2	Hitoyo Kimura	Decision (majority)	DEEP: clubDeep Nagoya: MB3z Impact, Di Entrare	May 21, 2006	2	5:00	Nagoya, Aichi, Japan	
Win	6–2	Paulo Teixeira	Decision (split)	XFG: X Fight Games	December 10, 2005	3	5:00	Brazil	
Win	5–2	Everaldo Sadan	Submission (strikes)	Shooto Brazil 8	April 30, 2005	1	N/A	Brazil	
Win	4–2	Emerson Graxaim	TKO	Shooto Brazil 7	March 19, 2005	N/A	N/A	Brazil	
Win	3–2	Paulo Roberto Nogueira	Decision	Shooto Brazil 6	February 26, 2005	N/A	N/A	Curitiba, Paraná, Brazil	
Loss	2–2	Felipe Arinelli	Decision (unanimous)	Papucaia Fight	September 11, 2004	3	5:00	Cachoeiras de Macacu, Rio de Janeiro, Brazil	
Win	2–1	Lamar Silva	Submission (strikes)	AFC Brazil 1	August 28, 2004	1	1:00	Nova Friburgo, Rio de Janeiro, Brazil	
Loss	1–1	Fabrício Madeirada	Decision	Gladiador 5	September 20, 2003	N/A	N/A	Salvador, Bahia, Brazil	
Win	1–0	Rogério Sagate	Submission (exhaustion)	Brazilian Gladiators 1	October 14, 2001	1	N/A	São Paulo, Brazil	
