= Shane Carwin =

American mixed martial artist

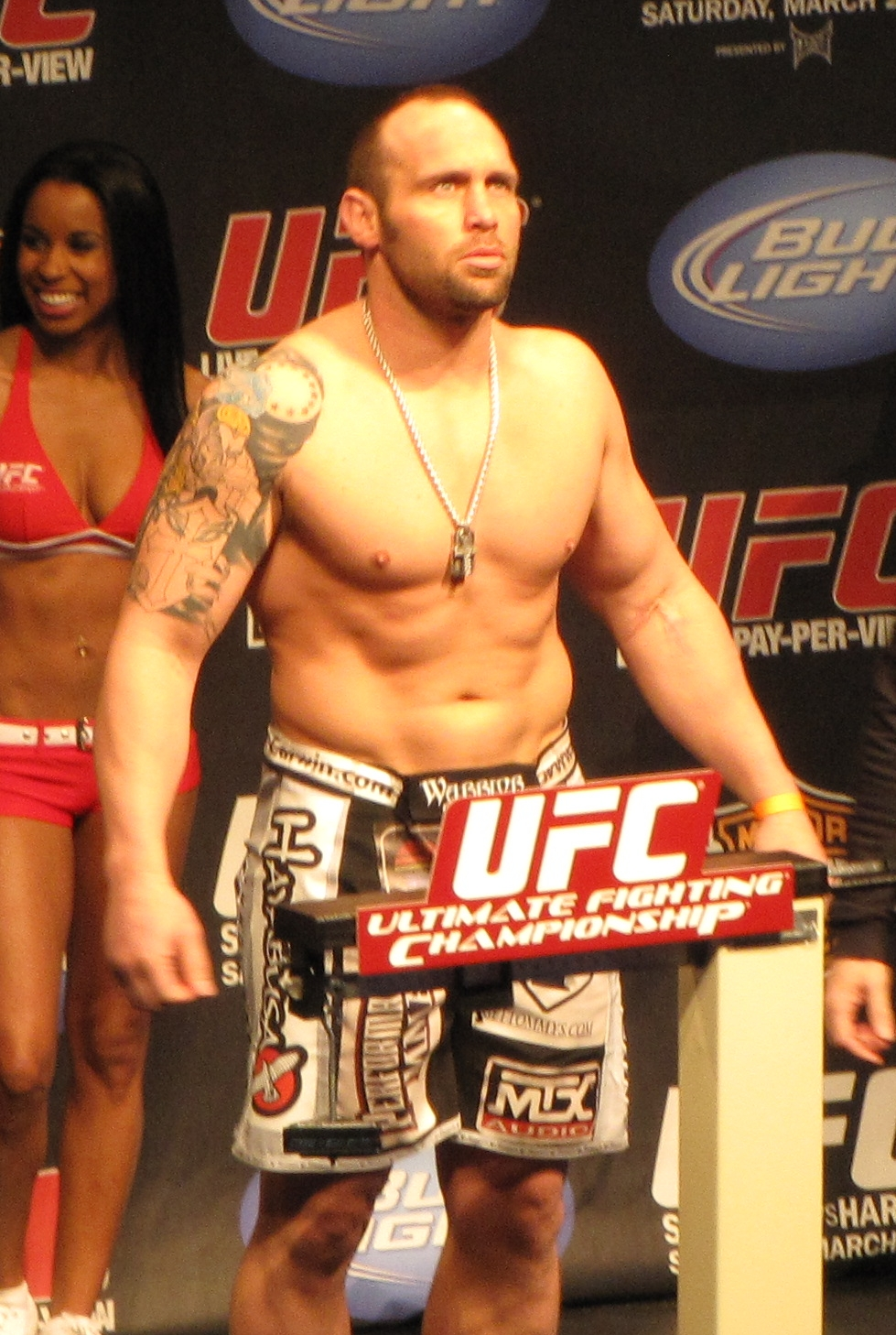
- Carwin in 2010
- Born: Shane Bannister Carwin; January 4, 1975 (age 51); Greeley, Colorado, U.S.
- Height: 6 ft 2 in (188 cm)
- Weight: 254 lb (115 kg; 18 st 2 lb)
- Division: Heavyweight (265 lb)
- Reach: 80 in (203 cm)
- Style: Wrestling, Boxing
- Fighting out of: Denver, Colorado, U.S.
- Team: Grudge Training Center; Jackson's Submission Fighting
- Trainer: Greg Jackson; Trevor Wittman; Nate Marquardt
- Rank: Purple belt in Brazilian Jiu-Jitsu
- Wrestling: NCAA Division II Wrestling
- Years active: 2005–2011 (MMA)

Mixed martial arts record
- Total: 14
- Wins: 12
- By knockout: 8
- By submission: 4
- Losses: 2
- By submission: 1
- By decision: 1

Other information
- Occupation: Engineer
- University: Colorado School of Mines; Western State College of Colorado
- Notable school: Greeley West High School
- Mixed martial arts record from Sherdog
- Last updated on: March 20, 2011

Shane Bannister Carwin (born January 4, 1975) is an American former mixed martial artist who competed in the Heavyweight division of the Ultimate Fighting Championship (UFC), where he is a former Interim UFC Heavyweight Champion. He is considered to be one of the hardest hitting athletes to ever fight in the UFC.

== Background ==
Carwin and his two brothers were raised by their mother, who had the goal of providing all her sons with a college education. He started wrestling when he was six years old. He received a bachelor's degree in mechanical engineering from the Colorado School of Mines as well as a bachelor's degree in environmental technology from Western State College. Carwin became an engineer out of college and continued to work in that field while pursuing his MMA career.

Carwin wrestled in college, becoming a two-time NCAA Division II Wrestling National Runner-Up as a heavyweight in 1996 and 1997, and the NCAA II Wrestling Heavyweight National Champion in 1999. He was also a two-time All-American in football for Western State and was chosen to participate in the Senior Bowl. Carwin is also a volunteer wrestling coach for the University of Northern Colorado.

== Mixed martial arts career ==
Carwin made his professional debut at WEC 17, weighing 285 lbs, he went on to win his first eight professional fights by first round stoppage, including the Ring of Fire Heavyweight championship during his two fight tenure for the regional promotion, before signing with the UFC.

=== Ultimate Fighting Championship ===
Carwin made his UFC debut on the undercard of UFC 84 against Christian Wellisch. He won the match via one punch knockout 44 seconds into the first round, demonstrating his punching power by sending Wellisch's mouthpiece flying across the octagon. Carwin followed up with an appearance in Birmingham, England at UFC 89 against Neil Wain, winning another one sided fight via TKO at 1:31 of the first round. At UFC 96, Carwin took a major step up in competition when he faced former number one contender and renowned Brazilian jiu-jitsu black belt Gabriel Gonzaga. After being stunned by a flurry of punches, Carwin knocked Gonzaga unconscious with a short right hand at 1:09 of the first round.

Carwin was then set to face fellow undefeated heavyweight contender Cain Velasquez at UFC 104, with the winner getting a title shot against then-champion Brock Lesnar; however, the UFC reconsidered the bout and Carwin was confirmed to fight for the title at UFC 106 on November 21, 2009. The fight was later postponed after Lesnar pulled out due to illness, with UFC 108 a likely date. Lesnar then pulled out of that fight on October 26, and Dana White reported at the UFC 105 post-fight press conference that Lesnar was too ill to compete and was expected to be out for the first half of 2010 while recovering from an intestinal disorder and subsequent surgery.

Carwin fought former UFC Heavyweight Champion Frank Mir for the UFC Interim Heavyweight Championship on March 27, 2010, at UFC 111. Carwin stated on his website that, "Mir is a legend of the sport, and I would be honored to fight him." Early in the first round, Carwin dropped Mir with multiple uppercuts from the clinch. Carwin then followed Mir to the ground, took back mount and rained down heavy punches on Mir's head thus winning the fight via knockout to become the UFC Interim Heavyweight Champion. The bout also marked the longest fight of Carwin's career at three minutes and 48 seconds; his previous mark was his MMA debut against Carlton Jones, with a time of 2 minutes and 11 seconds. Following UFC 111, Beau Dure of USA Today compared Carwin to Mike Tyson, echoing a similar comparison made prior to the event by Mark Wayne of Fightline.com.

Carwin then went on to face Brock Lesnar for the undisputed UFC Heavyweight Championship at UFC 116. He dominated the first round, knocking Lesnar down and unleashing a relentless ground and pound attack to Lesnar. However, Lesnar survived, and having tired from the first round and never being in a fight beyond the first round in his career, Carwin visibly tired. In the second round, Lesnar took an exhausted Carwin down and applied an arm-triangle choke, forcing Carwin to submit.

Carwin was scheduled to face former IFL Heavyweight Champion Roy Nelson on January 1, 2011, at UFC 125; however, he later announced on his website that he would pull out of the fight due to back and neck pain, which required surgery that took place on November 2, 2010. Carwin later stated that the neck surgery was a success. On January 3, 2011, Carwin posted a blog entry on his website, stating that he had just begun his first day of training since his neck surgery, hoping to be back in the octagon by May or June 2011.

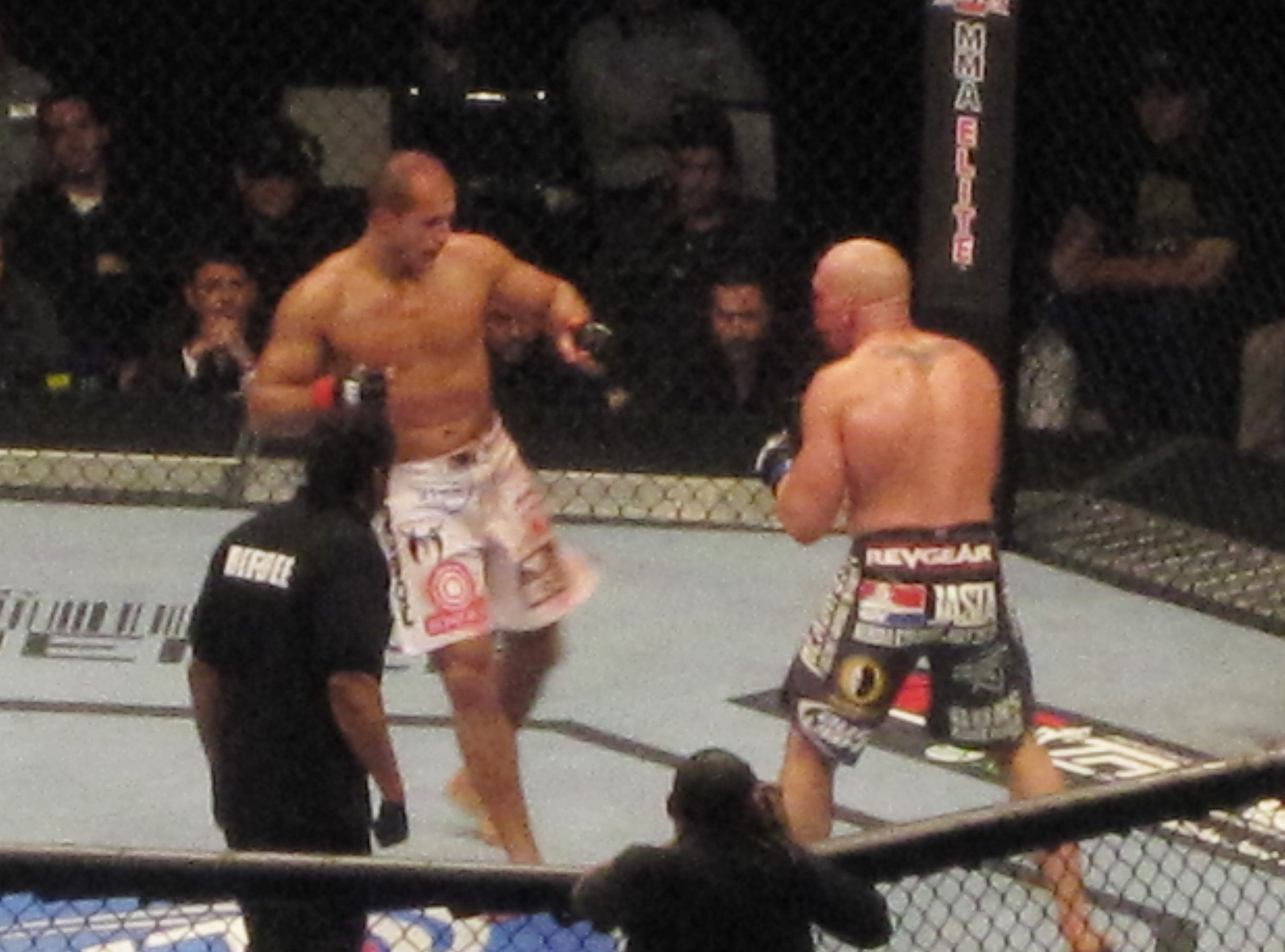
Shane Carwin was defeated by Junior dos Santos via unanimous decision in the main event of UFC 131.

Carwin was expected to face promotional newcomer Jon Olav Einemo on June 11, 2011, at UFC 131. However, another bout with diverticulitis sidelined Brock Lesnar, so Carwin agreed to step in to the main event to fight Junior dos Santos. Carwin was defeated by Dos Santos via unanimous decision (30–27, 30–27, and 30–26). This fight was the first in Carwin's career to ever go to a decision.

On September 9, 2011, Carwin posted a blog entry on his website stating that he was 100% healthy and looking to return to the octagon in late December or early January. However, on October 16, 2011, it was revealed that Carwin would need back surgery. He was expected to be out until mid-2012. However, his recovery took longer than expected, and he was targeting a return to fighting that fall.

On Thursday July 12, 2012, Dana White announced that Carwin and Roy Nelson had been picked as the next coaches for the 16th season of The Ultimate Fighter (TUF) and were expected to face each other on December 15, 2012, at The Ultimate Fighter: Team Carwin vs. Team Nelson Finale. However, on November 14, 2012, Dana White revealed on Twitter that Carwin injured his knee and would not be facing Nelson in the TUF finale.

On May 7, 2013, Carwin announced his retirement from mixed martial arts (MMA) after enduring several injuries since his last fight on June 11, 2011.

=== MMA return ===
On July 26, 2016, Carwin announced his plans to return to MMA, five years since his last competitive bout. On September 7, 2016, Carwin announced that he had worked with his management team at Ingrained Media to secure his release from the UFC and became a free agent. On October 28, 2016, Carwin announced he had signed with Rizin Fighting Federation. He stated that he expected to debut on their December 29, 2016, card, but later withdrew with injury.

In late 2017, Carwin was in negotiations with Bellator MMA but nothing came to fruition, despite having rehabilitated from his injuries.

== Boxing career ==
On October 15, 2016, Carwin participated in a boxing exhibition match against professional skateboarder Jason Ellis at EllisMania 13. Per the unique rules, Carwin had one of his arms duct-taped to his body to box Ellis. He won the bout via knockout in the second round.

== Personal life ==
Carwin is divorced and has a son from a previous marriage. He has a daughter born in February 2010.

In 2024, Shane Carwin and other men who fought in the UFC launched a lawsuit against the UFC claiming that they had suffered brain damage and other health problems.

== Championships and accomplishments ==
=== Mixed martial arts ===
- Ultimate Fighting Championship
  - Interim UFC Heavyweight Championship (One time)
  - Knockout of the Night (One time) vs. Frank Mir
  - UFC.com Awards
    - 2008: Ranked #4 Newcomer of the Year
    - 2009: Ranked #9 Knockout of the Year vs. Gabriel Gonzaga
    - 2010: Ranked #4 Fight of the Year vs. Brock Lesnar
- Ring of Fire
  - ROF Heavyweight Championship (One time)

=== Amateur wrestling ===
- National Collegiate Athletic Association
  - NCAA Division II Wrestling Hall of Fame (2011)
  - NCAA Division II Wrestling Heavyweight Champion (1999)
  - NCAA Division II National Wrestling Heavyweight Runner-Up (1996, 1997)
  - NCAA Division II All American (1996, 1997, 1999)
- Western State College
  - Western State College Mountaineer Sports Hall of Fame (2004)
- Rocky Mountain Athletic Conference
  - Rocky Mountain Athletic Conference Hall of Fame (2010)

== Mixed martial arts record ==
Professional record breakdown
14 matches	12 wins	2 losses
By knockout	8	0
By submission	4	1
By decision	0	1

Res.	Record	Opponent	Method	Event	Date	Round	Time	Location	Notes
Loss	12–2	Junior dos Santos	Decision (unanimous)	UFC 131	June 11, 2011	3	5:00	Vancouver, British Columbia, Canada	UFC Heavyweight title eliminator.
Loss	12–1	Brock Lesnar	Submission (arm-triangle choke)	UFC 116	July 3, 2010	2	2:19	Las Vegas, Nevada, United States	For the UFC Heavyweight Championship.
Win	12–0	Frank Mir	KO (punches)	UFC 111	March 27, 2010	1	3:48	Newark, New Jersey, United States	Won the interim UFC Heavyweight Championship. Knockout of the Night.
Win	11–0	Gabriel Gonzaga	TKO (punches)	UFC 96	March 7, 2009	1	1:09	Columbus, Ohio, United States	
Win	10–0	Neil Wain	TKO (punches)	UFC 89	October 18, 2008	1	1:31	Birmingham, England, United Kingdom	
Win	9–0	Christian Wellisch	KO (punch)	UFC 84	May 24, 2008	1	0:44	Las Vegas, Nevada, United States	
Win	8–0	Sherman Pendergarst	TKO (punches)	ROF 31: Undisputed	December 1, 2007	1	1:41	Broomfield, Colorado, United States	Won the ROF Heavyweight Championship.
Win	7–0	Rex Richards	Submission (guillotine choke)	Art of War 4	October 27, 2007	1	1:24	Tunica, Mississippi, United States	
Win	6–0	Rick Slaton	KO (punch)	ROF 30: Domination	September 15, 2007	1	0:49	Broomfield, Colorado, United States	
Win	5–0	Chris Guillen	Submission (rear-naked choke)	Ultimate Texas Showdown 6	June 24, 2006	1	0:29	Frisco, Texas, United States	
Win	4–0	Justice Smith	TKO (punches)	Extreme Wars 3: Bay Area Brawl	June 3, 2006	1	0:31	Oakland, California, United States	
Win	3–0	Jay McCown	Submission (rear-naked choke)	Ultimate Texas Showdown 5	April 29, 2006	1	1:31	Frisco, Texas, United States	
Win	2–0	Casey Jackson	Submission (guillotine choke)	Extreme Wars 2: X-1	March 18, 2006	1	0:22	Honolulu, Hawaii, United States	
Win	1–0	Carlton Jones	TKO (submission to punches)	WEC 17	October 14, 2005	1	2:11	Lemoore, California, United States	

== Pay-per-view bouts ==
No	Event	PPV buys
1.	UFC 116	1,160,000
2.	UFC 131	330,000

== See also ==
- List of current UFC fighters

Achievements
Vacant Title last held by Frank Mir	4th UFC Interim Heavyweight Champion; March 27, 2010 – July 3, 2010; Lost unification bout against Brock Lesnar	Vacant
