= Per Eklund (fighter) =

Swedish mixed martial arts fighter

- Born: November 12, 1980 (age 45); Stockholm, Sweden
- Nationality: Swedish
- Height: 5 ft 10 in (1.78 m)
- Weight: 145 lb (66 kg; 10.4 st)
- Division: Featherweight; Lightweight; Welterweight
- Reach: 72.0 in (183 cm)
- Fighting out of: Stockholm, Sweden
- Rank: Purple belt in Brazilian Jiu-Jitsu
- Years active: 2002-2011 (MMA); 2007 (Boxing)

Mixed martial arts record
- Total: 20
- Wins: 14
- By knockout: 2
- By submission: 7
- By decision: 4
- Unknown: 1
- Losses: 5
- By knockout: 3
- By decision: 2
- Draws: 1

Other information
- Boxing record from BoxRec
- Mixed martial arts record from Sherdog

Per Eklund (born November 12, 1980, in Stockholm) is a retired Swedish Lightweight professional mixed martial artist. Eklund was the first Swedish fighter to compete in Ultimate Fighting Championship and also formerly competed for M-1 Global.

== Mixed martial arts career ==
=== Early career ===
As one of the first successful mixed martial artists to come Sweden, Eklund is by many considered as a pioneer for Swedish MMA.
In 2002, he started out his professional career fighting on the smaller European circuit, with many wins and finishes to his credit, including winning and defending the Strike and submit lightweight title in 2007. He also competed in the Russian M-1 Global organisation.

Eklund also had a few fights on the international scene, for promotions lite Shooto in Japan and Canadian Bodog Fight.
As of 2007 he had racked up a record of 13-2-1, including wins over former PRIDE- and future UFC veteran David Baron, future UFC veteran Tom Niinimäki and future WEC and Bellator MMA veteran Rafael Dias, before getting the call from the UFC.

=== Ultimate Fighting Championships ===
In 2008, Eklund became the first Swede to sign with the UFC.
At UFC 80, he fought against Sam Stout and lost via unanimous decision.
He was given another chance and went up against Samy Schiavo at UFC 89, who he defeated by rear naked choke.
In his last fight for the promotion, he was defeated via TKO by his then undefeated opponent Evan Dunham at UFC 95.

== Championships and accomplishments ==
=== Mixed martial arts ===
- Strike and Submit
  - Strike and Submit Lightweight Championship (One time; first)
  - One successful title defense
- FinnFight
  - FinnFight 6 Featherweight Tournament Winner
- Viking Fight
  - Viking Fight 2 Lightweight Tournament Winner

== Mixed martial arts record ==
Professional record breakdown
20 matches	14 wins	5 losses
By knockout	3	3
By submission	7	0
By decision	4	2
Draws	1	

Res.	Record	Opponent	Method	Event	Date	Round	Time	Location	Notes
Loss	14–5–1	Thomas Hytten	KO (punch)	Vision FC 2	March 19, 2011	1	0:48	Karlstad, Sweden	
Loss	14–4–1	Evan Dunham	TKO (punches)	UFC 95	February 21, 2009	1	2:14	London, England	
Win	14–3–1	Samy Schiavo	Submission (rear-naked choke)	UFC 89	October 18, 2008	3	1:47	Birmingham, England	
Loss	13–3–1	Sam Stout	Decision (unanimous)	UFC 80	January 19, 2008	3	5:00	Newcastle, England	
Win	13–2–1	Rafael Dias	Decision (unanimous)	Bodog Fight: Vancouver	August 25, 2007	3	5:00	Vancouver, British Columbia, Canada	
Win	12–2–1	Toni Talvitie	Decision (unanimous)	Shooto Finland: Bloodbath	May 12, 2007	2	5:00	Vantaa, Finland	
Win	11–2–1	David Metcalf	Submission (kimura)	Strike and Submit 2	April 15, 2007	2	3:26	Gateshead, England	Defended Strike and Submit Lightweight Championship.
Win	10–2–1	Aaron Barrow	Submission (kimura)	Strike and Submit 1	January 28, 2007	1	1:19	Gateshead, England	Won Strike and Submit Lightweight Championship.
Loss	9–2–1	Tatsuya Kawajiri	TKO (punches)	Shooto: Champion Carnival	October 14, 2006	1	4:10	Yokohama, Japan	
Win	9–1–1	David Baron	Decision (unanimous)	European Vale Tudo 6 - Ragnarok	May 6, 2006	3	5:00	Stockholm, Sweden	
Loss	8–1–1	Yuri Ivlev	Decision (unanimous)	M-1 MFC: Russia vs. Europe	April 8, 2006	2	5:00	St. Petersburg, Russia	
Win	8–0–1	Chico Martinez	Submission (armbar)	Rings Muay Thai	November 20, 2005	1	N/A	Enschede, Netherlands	
Win	7–0–1	Mikhail Rosokhaty	Submission (armbar)	WFCA: Latvia Free Fight 2	October 24, 2004	1	N/A	Riga, Latvia	
Win	6–0–1	Colin Mannsur	KO (knees)	Together Productions: Fight Gala	September 18, 2004	N/A	N/A	Netherlands	
Draw	5–0–1	Thomas Hytten	Draw	Shooto Finland: Cold War	February 22, 2003	2	5:00	Turku, Finland	
Win	5–0	Teemu Nurkkala	TKO (punches)	FinnFight 6	November 30, 2002	1	0:35	Turku, Finland	Won FF 6 Featherweight Tournament.
Win	4–0	Tom Niinimäki	TKO (punches)	FinnFight 6	November 30, 2002	1	3:53	Turku, Finland	
Win	3–0	Tchavdar Pavlov	Submission (triangle choke)	Viking Fight 2: The Modern Gladiators	October 26, 2002	1	N/A	Broendby, Denmark	Won VF 2 Lightweight Tournament.
Win	2–0	Karim Sorensen	Submission (armbar)	Viking Fight 2: The Modern Gladiators	October 26, 2002	1	N/A	Broendby, Denmark	
Win	1–0	Ilya Kudryashov	Decision (split)	M-1 MFC: European Championship 2002	February 15, 2002	2	5:00	St. Petersburg, Russia	

== Professional boxing record ==
1 Win (0 knockouts, 1 decision), 0 Losses
Res.	Record	Opponent	Type	Rd., Time	Date	Location	Notes
Win	1–0	(France) Lloyd Hollard	MD	4 (4)	2007-09-28	Kungliga Tennishallen, Stockholm, Sweden	
