= Sam Stout =

Canadian mixed martial arts fighter

- Born: April 23, 1984 (age 42); London, Ontario, Canada
- Nickname: Hands of Stone
- Height: 5 ft 9 in (1.75 m)
- Weight: 155 lb (70 kg; 11.1 st)
- Division: Lightweight
- Reach: 70 in (178 cm)
- Style: Karate, Kickboxing, Brazilian Jiu-Jitsu
- Stance: Orthodox
- Fighting out of: London, Ontario, Canada
- Team: Adrenaline Training Center
- Trainer: Shawn Tompkins
- Rank: Brown belt in Brazilian Jiu-Jitsu
- Years active: 2003–2015

Kickboxing record
- Total: 20
- Wins: 16
- Losses: 4

Mixed martial arts record
- Total: 33
- Wins: 20
- By knockout: 9
- By submission: 1
- By decision: 10
- Losses: 12
- By knockout: 3
- By submission: 3
- By decision: 6
- Draws: 1

Other information
- Spouse: Jessica Stout
- Children: Logan Stout; Sydney Love Stout
- Website: samstout.com
- Mixed martial arts record from Sherdog

Sam Stout (born April 23, 1984) is a Canadian retired professional mixed martial artist. A professional from 2003 until 2015, Stout is best known for his 20-fight stint with the Ultimate Fighting Championship (UFC), winning Fight of the Night honors seven times. He is also the former TKO Major League MMA Lightweight Champion.

== Background ==
Stout was born in London, Ontario, Canada, on April 23, 1984. Stout has an older sister, Emilie, who would become the wife of late Shawn Tompkins. Albeit Stout followed his father's footsteps and begun karate at a young age, he didn't continue it – or any other sport – very seriously. It wasn't until Tompkins enticed Stout to start kickboxing around 2000. Before transitioning to mixed martial arts, Stout competed in professional kickboxing, holding a record of 16–4 with a win over Kotetsu Boku in K-1 Max.

== Mixed martial arts career ==
=== Ultimate Fighting Championship ===
Stout made his UFC debut at UFC 58: USA vs. Canada, on March 4, 2006. Although Stout was originally scheduled to face Kenny Florian, Florian withdraw from the bout due to a back injury. On short notice, Spencer Fisher – of the prestigious Miletich Fighting Systems camp – agreed to substitute for the injured Florian. Stout and Fisher fought for three action packed rounds at with Stout winning a split decision. Although the bout was not aired on the pay-per-view broadcast, the fight has subsequently been shown on episodes of UFC Unleashed. The fight was voted #16 on the UFC's 100 greatest fights show.

Stout succumbed to a rear naked choke submission at the hands of Kenny Florian during The Ultimate Fighter 3 finale on June 24, 2006. Following his loss to Kenny Florian, Stout defeated Jay Estrada by armbar, avenging his first career loss. In February 2007, Stout defeated Brazilian submission grappler Fabio Holanda to defend his TKO World Lightweight Championship.

In Stout's return to the UFC in the main event of UFC Fight Night 10, he was defeated in a rematch by Spencer Fisher via unanimous decision. Later, at UFC 80, he defeated Per Eklund from Sweden, by unanimous decision. Stout lost by split decision to Rich Clementi at UFC 83 in Montreal, Quebec, Canada. The scores were 29–27 Clementi, 29–28 Stout and 29–28 Clementi.

At UFC 89, Stout was defeated by Terry Etim via unanimous decision. Combining precise kicks with fast hands and a precise jab, Etim controlled Stout through the duration of the fight, only having to fend off sporadic and often desperate bursts from the Canadian in reply.

Stout's next fight was against Matt Wiman at UFC 97, which he won via unanimous decision (29–28, 29–28, 29–28) after hurting Wiman with a brutal liver shot. The fight was declared Fight of the Night.

Stout's was set to fight against Phillipe Nover at UFC Fight Night 19. On September 16, 2009, the day of the fight, Nover had a seizure. As a result, the match was cancelled. Stout defeated Joe Lauzon by unanimous decision on January 2, 2010, at UFC 108. The bout earned Fight of the Night honours, giving Stout his fourth FOTN.

Stout was then defeated by Jeremy Stephens via split decision at UFC 113 in his home country of Canada. The bout won the Fight of the Night award, giving Stout his fifth, tying him with Tyson Griffin for the most Fight of the Nights in UFC history.

Stout next faced Paul Taylor on October 23, 2010, at UFC 121. The first round saw Stout bloody Taylor's nose and successfully gain a takedown. Taylor came back in the second, catching Stout on the inside. Stout went on to win a razor thin split decision (29–28, 28–29, 30–27). MMAJunkie scored the fight 29–28 Taylor and Sherdog gave Taylor all 3 rounds.

Stout was expected to face Paul Kelly on February 5, 2011, at UFC 126. However, Stout was forced out of the bout with an injury and replaced by Donald Cerrone.

Stout next faced Yves Edwards on June 11, 2011, at UFC 131. Stout won the fight via first-round KO after countering Edwards with an overhand left square on the chin and earned Knockout of the Night honours. This also marked Stout's first stoppage victory in the UFC.

Stout was expected to face Dennis Siver on October 29, 2011, at UFC 137. However, it was announced on August 29, 2011, that Stout had pulled out of the bout.

Stout faced Thiago Tavares on January 14, 2012, at UFC 142. Stout lost the fight by a close unanimous decision (29-28, 29-28, 29-28).

Stout faced Spencer Fisher for a third time on June 22, 2012, at UFC on FX 4. He won the fight by unanimous decision. Both participants earned Fight of the Night honours for their performances.

Stout fought John Makdessi on November 17, 2012, at UFC 154. After being outstruck for three rounds, Stout lost via unanimous decision.

Stout faced Strikeforce import Caros Fodor on February 23, 2013, at UFC 157. Stout defeated Fodor by split decision.

Stout was expected to face Isaac Vallie-Flagg on June 15, 2013, at UFC 161. However, Vallie-Flagg was forced out with a back injury and was replaced by James Krause. He lost the back-and-forth fight via submission in the third round in a bout that earned both participants Fight of the Night honours.

Stout faced Cody McKenzie on December 14, 2013, at UFC on Fox 9. He won the fight via unanimous decision.

Stout faced K. J. Noons in a welterweight bout on April 16, 2014, at The Ultimate Fighter Nations Finale. He lost the fight via knockout in the first round.

Stout faced Ross Pearson on March 14, 2015, at UFC 185. Stout lost the fight via knockout in the second round after he was dropped with a left hook and finished off with a right hand on the ground.

Stout faced Frankie Perez at UFC Fight Night 74 on August 23, 2015. He lost the fight via knockout in the first round.

Stout announced his retirement from mixed martial arts in September 2015.

== Personal life ==
Stout has a daughter, Logan (born 2014), from his previous relationship with Tara Cassetta. On April 12, 2020, Stout announced on his social media that he and his wife Jessica Lablanche (Montreal-based makeup artist for Folio Montreal) welcomed a daughter, Sydney, to the world. However, at the age of only a month, she died in her sleep.

Stout has been involved with several other UFC fighters (Sean Pierson, Mark Hominick, and Matt Mitrione) as part of a Toronto area anti-bullying program.

Alongside with Chris Horodecki and Mark Hominick, Stout co-owns the Adrenaline Training Center located in his home town of London, Ontario.

== Championships and awards ==
- Ultimate Fighting Championship
  - Fight of the Night (Six times)
  - Knockout of the Night (One time)
  - UFC.com Awards
    - 2006: Ranked #10 Fight of the Year vs. Spencer Fisher 1 (Tied with Drew McFedries vs. Alessio Sakara)
    - 2007: Half-Year Awards: Best Fight of the 1HY & Ranked #5 Fight of the Year vs. Spencer Fisher 2
    - 2010: Ranked #10 Fight of the Year vs. Jeremy Stephens
    - 2011: Ranked #2 Knockout of the Year vs. Yves Edwards
- Canadian Pro-Wrestling Hall of Fame
  - Class of 2025 (MMA Wing)
- TKO Major League MMA
  - TKO Lightweight Championship (One time, with four defences; subsequently vacated title)

== Mixed martial arts record ==
Professional record breakdown
33 matches	20 wins	12 losses
By knockout	9	3
By submission	1	3
By decision	10	6
Draws	1	

Res.	Record	Opponent	Method	Event	Date	Round	Time	Location	Notes
Loss	20–12–1	Frankie Perez	TKO (punches)	UFC Fight Night: Holloway vs. Oliveira	August 23, 2015	1	0:54	Saskatoon, Saskatchewan, Canada	
Loss	20–11–1	Ross Pearson	KO (punch)	UFC 185	March 14, 2015	2	1:33	Dallas, Texas, United States	
Loss	20–10–1	K. J. Noons	KO (punches)	The Ultimate Fighter Nations Finale: Bisping vs. Kennedy	April 16, 2014	1	0:30	Quebec City, Quebec, Canada	Welterweight bout.
Win	20–9–1	Cody McKenzie	Decision (unanimous)	UFC on Fox: Johnson vs. Benavidez 2	December 14, 2013	3	5:00	Sacramento, California, United States	
Loss	19–9–1	James Krause	Submission (guillotine choke)	UFC 161	June 15, 2013	3	4:47	Winnipeg, Manitoba, Canada	Fight of the Night.
Win	19–8–1	Caros Fodor	Decision (split)	UFC 157	February 23, 2013	3	5:00	Anaheim, California, United States	
Loss	18–8–1	John Makdessi	Decision (unanimous)	UFC 154	November 17, 2012	3	5:00	Montreal, Quebec, Canada	
Win	18–7–1	Spencer Fisher	Decision (unanimous)	UFC on FX: Maynard vs. Guida	June 22, 2012	3	5:00	Atlantic City, New Jersey, United States	Fight of the Night.
Loss	17–7–1	Thiago Tavares	Decision (unanimous)	UFC 142	January 14, 2012	3	5:00	Rio de Janeiro, Brazil	
Win	17–6–1	Yves Edwards	KO (punch)	UFC 131	June 11, 2011	1	3:52	Vancouver, British Columbia, Canada	Knockout of the Night.
Win	16–6–1	Paul Taylor	Decision (split)	UFC 121	October 23, 2010	3	5:00	Anaheim, California, United States	
Loss	15–6–1	Jeremy Stephens	Decision (split)	UFC 113	May 8, 2010	3	5:00	Montreal, Quebec, Canada	Fight of the Night.
Win	15–5–1	Joe Lauzon	Decision (unanimous)	UFC 108	January 2, 2010	3	5:00	Las Vegas, Nevada, United States	Fight of the Night.
Win	14–5–1	Matt Wiman	Decision (unanimous)	UFC 97	April 18, 2009	3	5:00	Montreal, Quebec, Canada	Fight of the Night.
Loss	13–5–1	Terry Etim	Decision (unanimous)	UFC 89	October 18, 2008	3	5:00	Birmingham, England	
Loss	13–4–1	Rich Clementi	Decision (split)	UFC 83	April 19, 2008	3	5:00	Montreal, Quebec, Canada	
Win	13–3–1	Per Eklund	Decision (unanimous)	UFC 80	January 19, 2008	3	5:00	Newcastle upon Tyne, England	
Win	12–3–1	Martin Grandmont	KO (punches)	TKO 30: Apocalypse.	September 28, 2007	1	3:00	Montreal, Quebec, Canada	Defended the TKO World Lightweight Championship.
Loss	11–3–1	Spencer Fisher	Decision (unanimous)	UFC Fight Night: Stout vs. Fisher	June 12, 2007	3	5:00	Hollywood, Florida, United States	Fight of the Night.
Win	11–2–1	Fabio Holanda	TKO (corner stoppage)	TKO 28: Inevitable	February 9, 2007	2	5:00	Montreal, Quebec, Canada	Defended the TKO World Lightweight Championship.
Win	10–2–1	Jay Estrada	Submission (armbar)	TKO 27: Reincarnation	September 29, 2006	2	1:21	Montreal, Quebec, Canada	Defended the TKO World Lightweight Championship.
Loss	9–2–1	Kenny Florian	Submission (rear-naked choke)	The Ultimate Fighter: Team Ortiz vs. Team Shamrock Finale	June 24, 2006	1	1:46	Las Vegas, Nevada, United States	
Win	9–1–1	Spencer Fisher	Decision (split)	UFC 58	March 4, 2006	3	5:00	Las Vegas, Nevada, United States	
Win	8–1–1	Donald Ouimet	KO (punches)	TKO 23: Extreme	November 5, 2005	1	4:43	Victoriaville, Quebec, Canada	Defended the TKO World Lightweight Championship.
Win	7–1–1	Donald Ouimet	Decision (split)	TKO 21: Collision	July 15, 2005	3	5:00	Montreal, Quebec, Canada	Won the TKO World Lightweight Championship.
Win	6–1–1	Tyler Jackson	Decision (unanimous)	TKO 20: Champion vs. Champion	April 2, 2005	3	5:00	Montreal, Quebec, Canada	
Win	5–1–1	Joey Brown	TKO (punches)	TKO 19: Rage	January 29, 2005	1	2:45	Montreal, Quebec, Canada	
Win	4–1–1	Dave Goulet	TKO (head kick)	TKO 18: Impact	November 26, 2004	3	0:59	Montreal, Quebec, Canada	
Win	3–1–1	Steve Claveau	TKO (elbows)	TKO 17: Revenge	September 25, 2004	1	3:07	Victoriaville, Quebec, Canada	
Win	2–1–1	Yves Jabouin	TKO (punch)	TKO 16: Infernal	May 22, 2004	1	4:15	Quebec City, Quebec, Canada	
Win	1–1–1	Stephane Laliberte	TKO (punches)	TKO: FutureStars	March 27, 2004	1	4:12	Victoriaville, Quebec, Canada	
Draw	0–1–1	Joey Clark	Draw	ICC: Trials	March 12, 2004	2	5:00	Minnesota, United States	
Loss	0–1	Jay Estrada	Submission (rear-naked choke)	Total Martial Arts Challenge	June 7, 2003	1	2:14	Cicero, Illinois, United States	

== See also ==
- List of current UFC fighters
- List of male mixed martial artists
- List of Canadian UFC fighters
