= David Baron (fighter) =

French mixed martial arts fighter

- Born: February 15, 1973 (age 53); Bois-Colombes, France
- Nationality: French
- Height: 1.68 m (5 ft 6 in)
- Weight: 75 kg (165 lb; 11.8 st)
- Division: Welterweight
- Team: Haute Tension

Mixed martial arts record
- Total: 22
- Wins: 17
- By knockout: 4
- By submission: 11
- By decision: 2
- Losses: 4
- By submission: 2
- By decision: 2
- Draws: 1

Other information
- Mixed martial arts record from Sherdog

David Baron (born February 15, 1973) is a French mixed martial artist and Shooto Middleweight European Champion. He has also competed for the UFC and Pride Fighting Championships. He holds wins over Dan Hardy and Hayato Sakurai.

== Championships and accomplishments ==
=== Mixed martial arts ===
- 2 Hot 2 Handle
  - 2H2H Road To Japan Welterweight Tournament Winner
- Shooto
  - Shooto Middleweight European Champion (2 times, First, Only)

== Mixed martial arts record ==
Professional record breakdown
22 matches	17 wins	4 losses
By knockout	4	0
By submission	11	2
By decision	2	2
Draws	1	

Res.	Record	Opponent	Method	Event	Date	Round	Time	Location	Notes
Loss	17–4–1	Jason Ponet	Decision (unanimous)	100% Fight 18: VIP	February 15, 2014	3	5:00	Aubervilliers, France	
Draw	17–3–1	Gor Harutunian	Decision (draw)	100% Fight: VIP	June 19, 2010	3	5:00	Paris, France	
Loss	17–3	Jim Miller	Submission (rear-naked choke)	UFC 89	October 18, 2008	3	3:19	London, England	
Win	17–2	Hayato Sakurai	Submission (guillotine choke)	Shooto: Shooto Tradition 1	May 3, 2008	1	4:50	Tokyo, Japan	
Win	16–2	Niek Tromp	Submission (guillotine choke)	Shooto: Belgium	December 15, 2007	1	1:23	Charleroi, Belgium	Won Shooto European Middleweight Championship
Win	15–2	Abdul Mohamed	TKO (doctor stoppage)	UF 7: 2 Tuf 2 Tap	October 20, 2007	1	3:22	England	
Win	14–2	Johnny Frachey	KO (punch)	Xtreme Gladiators 3	June 9, 2007	1	4:58	France	
Win	13–2	Jason Ball	Submission (armbar)	Ultimate Tear Up	February 24, 2007	1	2:09	Middlesbrough, England	
Loss	12–2	Takanori Gomi	Submission (rear-naked choke)	Pride - Bushido 12	August 26, 2006	1	7:10	Nagoya, Japan	Non Title Fight
Win	12–1	Joey Van Wanrooij	Submission (strikes)	2H2H: Road to Japan	June 18, 2006	1	1:35	Netherlands	Won 2H2H Road To Japan Welterweight Tournament
Win	11–1	Dan Hardy	Decision (unanimous)	2H2H: Road to Japan	June 18, 2006	2	3:00	Netherlands	2H2H Road To Japan Welterweight Tournament Semifinals
Loss	10–1	Per Eklund	Decision (unanimous)	EVT 6: Ragnarok	May 6, 2006	3	5:00	Stockholm, Sweden	
Win	10–0	Erik Oganov	KO (elbows)	M-1 MFC: Russia vs. Europe	April 8, 2006	2	3:12	Saint Petersburg, Russia	
Win	9–0	Olivier Elizabeth	Submission (rear-naked choke)	PFA: Pancrase Fighting Association	March 12, 2006	1	2:50	Bonneull, France	
Win	8–0	Dan Hardy	Submission (triangle choke)	CWFC: Strike Force	May 21, 2005	2	3:10	Coventry, England	
Win	7–0	Sauli Heilimo	Submission (reverse triangle choke)	Shooto Sweden: Second Impact	March 12, 2005	2	2:33	Stockholm, Sweden	Won Shooto European Middleweight Championship
Win	6–0	Stale Nyang	Decision (unanimous)	EVT 4: Gladiators	September 26, 2004	3	5:00	Stockholm, Sweden	
Win	5–0	Roemer Trumpert	Submission (triangle choke)	Shooto Holland: Fight Night	October 18, 2003	1	3:01	Vlissingen, Netherlands	
Win	4–0	Jean Frederic Dutriat	Submission (ankle lock)	World Absolute Fight 2	March 22, 2003	2	1:42	Marrakesh, Morocco	
Win	3–0	Martinsh Egle	TKO (left hook to the body)	Shooto Holland: The Lords of the Ring	May 12, 2002	1	0:35	Deventer, Netherlands	
Win	2–0	Dirk van Opstal	Submission (armbar)	Shooto Holland: Night of the Warriors	November 4, 2001	1	2:19	Netherlands	
Win	1–0	Carl Cincinnatus	Submission (guillotine choke)	Ultra Fight Kempokan	November 13, 1999	2	2:08	Paris, France	

== See also ==
- List of male mixed martial artists
