= List of UFC Light Heavyweight fighters =

This is a list of UFC Light Heavyweight Fighters

- Jon Jones
- Ryan Bader
- Tim Boetsch
- Stephan Bonnar
- Jason Brilz
- Luiz Cane
- Steve Cantwell
- Phil Davis
- Cyrille Diabate
- Rashad Evans
- Rich Franklin
- Forrest Griffin
- Alexander Gustafsson
- Matt Hamill
- Jared Hamman
- Quinton Jackson
- Jon Jones
- Kyle Kingsbury
- Lyoto Machida
- Fabio Maldonado
- Vladimir Matyushenko
- Stanislav Nedkov
- Antônio Rogério Nogueira
- Tito Ortiz
- Igor Pokrajac
- Ricardo Romero
- Mauricio Rua
- Thiago Silva
- Krzysztof Soszynski
- James Te Huna
- Brandon Vera
- Alex Pereira
