= Karlos Vémola =

Czech kickboxer, bodybuilder and mixed martial arts fighter

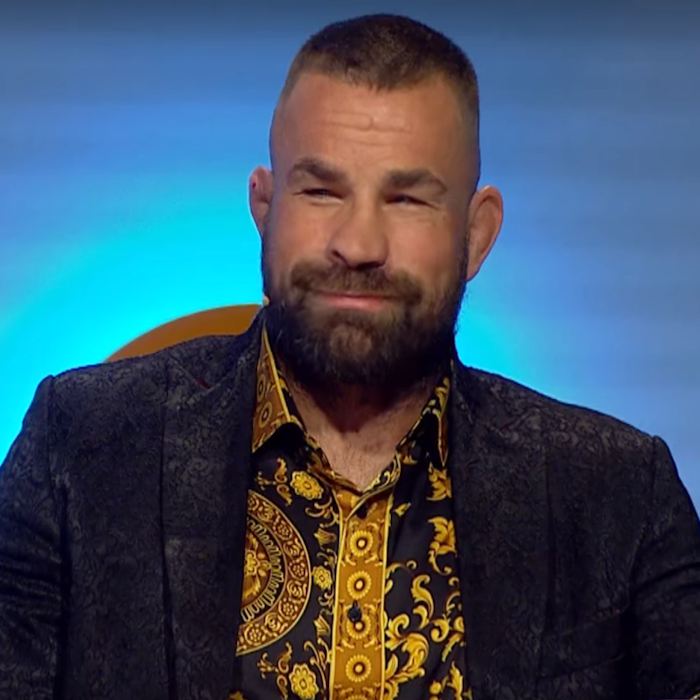
- Vémola in 2024
- Born: Karel Vémola; July 1, 1985 (age 41); Olomouc, Czechoslovakia
- Other names: The Terminator
- Nationality: Czech
- Height: 6 ft 0 in (1.83 m)
- Weight: 185 lb (84 kg; 13.2 st)
- Division: Heavyweight; Light Heavyweight; Middleweight
- Reach: 75.0 in (191 cm)
- Stance: Orthodox
- Fighting out of: London, England, United Kingdom
- Team: London Shootfighters, Reinders MMA
- Rank: Black belt in Brazilian jiu-jitsu
- Years active: 2008–2025

Mixed martial arts record
- Total: 48
- Wins: 39
- By knockout: 10
- By submission: 20
- By decision: 9
- Losses: 9
- By knockout: 2
- By submission: 3
- By decision: 4

Other information
- Mixed martial arts record from Sherdog

Karlos "Terminator" Vémola (born July 1, 1985) is a Czech former mixed martial artist, bodybuilder, wrestler and member of Sokol. He last competed in the Light Heavyweight division of Oktagon MMA, where he is the former Oktagon Middleweight and Light Heavyweight Champion. A professional competitor since 2008, he became historically the first UFC fighter from the Czech Republic, and has also competed for UCMMA.

== Background ==
Vémola began training in Greco-Roman wrestling at the age of six under the leadership of his father Karel Vémola and Vojtěch Smolák in Olomouc Sokol of which he is still a member.

From the ages of 10 until 16, Vemola won six national wrestling titles and is also a one-time winner of the Czech Republic Wrestling Team Championship as a youth team member of the Krnov wrestling team.

After his parents divorced he moved with his mother from Hanakia to the Bohemia. He resided in the Litice nad Orlicí and he started to train in the gym in Žamberk and he became a classic bodybuilder.

== Mixed martial arts career ==
=== Early MMA and bodybuilding career ===
Karlos Vémola moved to England to pursue bodybuilding.

There he became a bouncer in Tottenham. He worked as a bouncer in nightclub, which is next to the Tottenham police Station.

At a qualification tournament for British Championship of Bodybuilding he attempted to compete in the Junior Division but because he registered too late he had to compete in the Senior Division which he ended up winning. Because of this victory he was not allowed to compete at the Junior level of the championship so he refused to participate.

While working at his job as a bouncer he threw two men out of the nightclub who turned out to be MMA fighters. This led to his being asked by Alan Mortlock to fight in the Cage Fighters mixed martial arts organization. Karlos Vémola began unofficial and underground fighting at age of 21. Vémola made his professional MMA debut in 2008 when his weight was 255 lbs. Previously he fought in various street fights and underground fighting events.

Vémola won his first seven professional fights all via opening round stoppages in fights held in England by the Cage Fighters Championships and Ultimate Challenge MMA organizations. In the Cage Fighters Championship Karlos Vémola was the European Heavyweight Champion and World Heavyweight Champion.

He currently trains with the London Shootfighters team alongside MMA notables Alex Reid, John Hathaway and Michael Page.

=== Ultimate Fighting Championship ===
In April 2010, Karlos Vémola signed with the UFC. Vémola made his debut at UFC 116 against Jon Madsen. He lost the fight via unanimous decision.

Following his first professional loss, Vémola decided to drop down to the Light Heavyweight division. He faced Seth Petruzelli on November 13, 2010, at UFC 122 and won the fight via TKO in the first round, picking up his first victory in the UFC, becoming the first man to defeat Petruzelli by strikes, and also earning Knockout of the Night Honors.

Vémola was expected to face Brazilian Luiz Cane on March 19, 2011, at UFC 128. However, Vémola was forced out of the bout with an injury and replaced by Eliot Marshall.

Vémola was expected to face Stephan Bonnar on August 14, 2011, at UFC on Versus 5. However, an injury has forced Bonnar to withdraw from the bout. Newcomer Ronny Markes stepped in for the injured Bonnar to face Vémola. Vémola lost the fight via unanimous decision (30–27 on all cards).

Vémola was expected to face promotional newcomer Ryan Jimmo on January 20, 2012, at UFC on FX 1. However, Jimmo was forced from the bout with an injury and the bout was scrapped.

Vémola faced Mike Massenzio in his Middleweight debut on May 5, 2012, at UFC on Fox 3. Vémola won by second round submission via rear-naked choke.

Vémola quickly returned to face Francis Carmont at UFC on Fuel TV: Munoz vs. Weidman. He lost the fight via submission in the second round.

Vémola was expected to face former WEC Middleweight Champion Chris Leben on December 29, 2012, at UFC 155. However, Vémola was forced out of the bout and replaced by promotional newcomer Derek Brunson.

Vémola faced Caio Magalhães on June 8, 2013, at UFC on Fuel TV 10. Despite a dominant first round, Vémola lost the fight via rear naked choke submission in the second round and was subsequently released from the promotion.

=== Ultimate Challenge MMA ===
In his first fight after being released by the UFC, Karlos Vémola won the UCMMA Middleweight Champion by defeating then-champion Denniston Sutherland via unanimous decision on August 3, 2013.

Vémola was to fight against Mahmoud "Steel Man" Salama on February 1, 2014, at UCMMA 38. However, Salama announced that he was withdrawing from his fight against Vémola and replaced by Marvin Campbell. Moreover, Campbell did not attend the official Weigh-In and weighed shortly before the start of the event. It should be a light heavyweight bout but Campbell weighed 215 lb. Vémola defeated Campbell in the first round via submission.

=== Return to the Czech Republic ===
After he became UCMMA champion, Vémola decided he should fight in his homeland.

Karlos Vémola signed a contract for two fights with Czech MMA Association and for one fight with Gladiator Championship Fighting. One of the owners of GCF is famous Czech mixed martial artist Michal Hamršmíd.

Czech MMA artist and trainer Petr "Monster" Kníže insulted Karlos Vémola on social network and called him out. Some parts of Kníže martial arts career are unknown and his official MMA record by Sherdog is 3-0 (before fight with Karlos Vémola) but Czech MMA Association promoted his record as 21–0. Karlos Vémola accepted and both would face on November 10, 2013, at MMMA Arena 2 for middleweight title. Vémola won in third round by technical submission.

His next fight was in Prague. He fought longtime GCF Middleweight Champion Tomáš "Thor" Kužela for the GFC Middleweight Championship on December 7, 2013, at GCF 26: Fight Night. Vémola won in the first round by submission.

His next fight in Bohemia was with Polish MMA artist, Sanda and Muay Thai kickboxer Piotr Strus at MMAA Arena 3. He won the fight via unanimous decision.

Vémola faced Henrique da Silva at OKTAGON 13 on July 27, 2019. He won the fight via unanimous decision.

He then faced Attila Vegh at OKTAGON 15 on November 9, 2019. He lost the fight via knockout, halting his 11-fight winning streak.

Vémola was expected to face Václav Mikulášek at OKTAGON 17 on October 17, 2020. However, Mikulášek was unable to make weight (185 lbs) and was replaced by Thomas Robertsen, whom Vémola faced in catchweight bout. Vémola won the fight via third-round submission.

The fight with Mikulášek was rebooked to take place at OKTAGON 19 on December 5, 2020. Vémola won the fight via first-round submission.

Vémola faced Alex Lohoré at OKTAGON 20 on December 30, 2020. He won the fight via unanimous decision and became OKTAGON MMA Middleweight Champion.

Vémola was scheduled to defend his title against Milan Ďatelinka at OKTAGON 22 on March 27, 2021. However, he missed weight and was stripped of the title; the bout proceeded without the championship on the line. Vémola won the fight via first-round submission.

Vémola faced Michał Pasternak on June 4, 2022, at OKTAGON 33. He won the bout via arm-triangle choke in the first round.

Vémola faced Aleksandar Ilić on July 23, 2022, at OKTAGON 34. He won the bout via arm-triangle choke in the first round.

Vémola attempted to regain his Oktagon MMA Middleweight Championship against Patrik Kincl on May 20, 2023, at OKTAGON 43, losing the bout via unanimous decision.

Vémola faced Lucas Alsina on July 29, 2023, at OKTAGON 45, winning the bout via unanimous decision.

Vémola defended the Oktagon MMA Light Heavyweight Championship against Pavol Langer on October 7, 2023, at OKTAGON 47, knocking out Langer seven seconds into the bout.

Vémola faced Samuel Krištofič on December 29, 2023, at OKTAGON 51, getting knocked out in the first round.

Vémola defended the Oktagon MMA Light Heavyweight Championship against Attila Végh on June 8, 2024, at Oktagon 58, winning the fight via arm-triangle choke in the second round.

Vémola was scheduled to defend his Oktagon MMA Light Heavyweight Championship in a rematch against Samuel Krištofič on November 9, 2024, at Oktagon 63. Krištofič was forced to pull out of the fight due to an injury.

Vémola faced Will Fleury on 29 December 2024, at Oktagon 65. He lost the light heavyweight title by unanimous decision.

Vémola faced Attila Végh in a trilogy on June 14, 2025, at Oktagon 72. Vémola rallied in the fifth round after nearly being finished by Végh, ultimately winning the fight by unanimous decision and being crowned the Oktagon Infinity Champion.

After the fight Vémola announced his retirement from mixed martial arts.

== Championships and accomplishments ==
=== Mixed martial arts ===
- Ultimate Fighting Championship
  - Knockout of the Night (One time) vs. Seth Petruzelli
- OKTAGON MMA
  - OKTAGON MMA Middleweight Champion (One time; former)
  - OKTAGON MMA Light Heavyweight Champion (One time)
    - Two successful title defence
  - OKTAGON MMA INFINITY Champion
- Cage Fighters Championship
  - Cage Fighters Championship World Heavyweight Champion (One time)
  - Cage Fighters Championship European Heavyweight Champion (One time)
- Ultimate Challenge MMA
  - Ultimate Challenge MMA Middleweight Champion
  - Ultimate Challenge MMA Light Heavyweight Champion
- Gladiator Championship Fighting
  - Gladiator Championship Fighting Middleweight Champion
- Czech MMA Association
  - Czech MMA Association Middleweight Champion
- Night of Warriors
  - WASO -96 kg MMA World Champion
- X Fight Nights
  - XFN Light Heavyweight Champion

== Mixed martial arts record ==
Professional record breakdown
| 48 matches | 39 wins | 9 losses |
| By knockout | 10 | 2 |
| By submission | 20 | 3 |
| By decision | 9 | 4 |

| Res. | Record | Opponent | Method | Event | Date | Round | Time | Location | Notes |
|---|---|---|---|---|---|---|---|---|---|
| Win | 39–9 | Frederic Vosgröne | TKO (punches) | Oktagon 94 | September 26, 2026 | 2 | 2:50 | Frankfurt, Germany | Catchweight (196 lb) bout. Performance of the Night. |
| Win | 38–9 | Attila Végh | Decision (unanimous) | Oktagon 72 | June 14, 2025 | 5 | 5:00 | Prague, Czech Republic | Won the symbolic "Infinity" title. Performance of the Night. |
| Loss | 37–9 | Will Fleury | Decision (unanimous) | Oktagon 65 | December 29, 2024 | 5 | 5:00 | Prague, Czech Republic | Lost the Oktagon Light Heavyweight Championship. |
| Win | 37–8 | Attila Végh | Submission (arm-triangle choke) | Oktagon 58 | June 8, 2024 | 2 | 0:45 | Prague, Czech Republic | Defended the Oktagon Light Heavyweight Championship. |
| Loss | 36–8 | Samuel Krištofič | KO (punch) | Oktagon 51 | December 29, 2023 | 1 | 1:48 | Prague, Czech Republic | Catchweight (195 lb) bout. |
| Win | 36–7 | Pavol Langer | KO (punches) | Oktagon 47 | October 7, 2023 | 1 | 0:07 | Bratislava, Slovakia | Defended and unified the Oktagon Light Heavyweight Championship. |
| Win | 35–7 | Lucas Alsina | Decision (unanimous) | Oktagon 45 | July 29, 2023 | 3 | 5:00 | Prague, Czech Republic | Catchweight (201 lb) bout. |
| Loss | 34–7 | Patrik Kincl | Decision (unanimous) | Oktagon 43 | May 20, 2023 | 5 | 5:00 | Prague, Czech Republic | For the Oktagon Middleweight Championship. |
| Win | 34–6 | Al Matavao | Submission (rear-naked choke) | Oktagon 41 | April 15, 2023 | 1 | 3:18 | Liberec, Czech Republic | Catchweight (203 lb) bout. |
| Win | 33–6 | Aleksandar Ilić | Submission (arm-triangle choke) | Oktagon 34 | July 23, 2022 | 1 | 3:52 | Prague, Czech Republic | Won the vacant Oktagon Light Heavyweight Championship. |
| Win | 32–6 | Michał Pasternak | Submission (arm-triangle choke) | Oktagon 33 | June 4, 2022 | 1 | 3:55 | Frankfurt, Germany | Return to Light Heavyweight. |
| Win | 31–6 | Milan Ďatelinka | Submission (rear-naked choke) | Oktagon 22 | March 27, 2021 | 1 | 2:12 | Brno, Czech Republic | Vémola missed weight (186.3 lb) and was stripped of the Oktagon Middleweight Championship. Only Ďatelinka was eligible to win the title. |
| Win | 30–6 | Alex Lohoré | Decision (unanimous) | Oktagon 20 | December 30, 2020 | 5 | 5:00 | Brno, Czech Republic | Won the inaugural Oktagon Middleweight Championship. |
| Win | 29–6 | Václav Mikulášek | Submission (rear-naked choke) | Oktagon 19 | December 5, 2020 | 1 | 2:05 | Brno, Czech Republic | Return to Middleweight. |
| Win | 28–6 | Thomas Robertsen | Submission (north-south choke) | Oktagon 17 | October 17, 2020 | 3 | 1:02 | Brno, Czech Republic | Catchweight (198 lb) bout. |
| Loss | 27–6 | Attila Végh | KO (punch) | Oktagon 15 | November 9, 2019 | 1 | 2:07 | Prague, Czech Republic | |
| Win | 27–5 | Henrique da Silva | Decision (unanimous) | Oktagon 13 | July 27, 2019 | 3 | 5:00 | Prague, Czech Republic | |
| Win | 26–5 | Prince Aounallah | Decision (unanimous) | Night of Warriors 15 | April 6, 2019 | 3 | 5:00 | Liberec, Czech Republic | Return to Light Heavyweight. |
| Win | 25–5 | Paweł Brandys | Submission (rear-naked choke) | Oktagon 11 | March 16, 2019 | 1 | 4:25 | Ostrava, Czech Republic | |
| Win | 24–5 | Flavio Rodrigo Magon | TKO (punches) | X Fight Night 15 | December 27, 2018 | 1 | 1:57 | Prague, Czech Republic | Defended the XFN Light Heavyweight Championship. |
| Win | 23–5 | Moise Rimbon | Decision (unanimous) | X Fight Night 14 | November 18, 2018 | 3 | 5:00 | Bratislava, Slovakia | Return to Middleweight. |
| Win | 22–5 | Mateusz Ostrowski | TKO (punches) | X Fight Night 12 | October 6, 2018 | 2 | 1:06 | Plzeň, Czech Republic | Defended the XFN Light Heavyweight Championship. |
| Win | 21–5 | Patrik Kincl | Decision (unanimous) | X Fight Night 11 | June 28, 2018 | 3 | 5:00 | Prague, Czech Republic | Middleweight bout. |
| Win | 20–5 | Jamie Sloane | Submission (rear-naked choke) | X Fight Night 8 | March 3, 2018 | 1 | 2:06 | Pardubice, Czech Republic | Defended the XFN Light Heavyweight Championship. |
| Win | 19–5 | Petr Ondruš | Submission (rear-naked choke) | X Fight Night 6 | December 7, 2017 | 1 | 4:40 | Prague, Czech Republic | Won the XFN Light Heavyweight Championship. |
| Win | 18–5 | Maximilian Bajlitz | TKO (punches) | Night of Warriors 12 | November 11, 2017 | 1 | 1:02 | Liberec, Czech Republic | Catchweight (210 lb) bout. |
| Win | 17–5 | Dritan Barjamaj | TKO (elbows) | Night of Warriors 10 | November 5, 2016 | 1 | 1:43 | Liberec, Czech Republic | Won the Night of Warriors Light Heavyweight Championship. |
| Loss | 16–5 | Jack Hermansson | Submission (armbar) | Warrior Fight Series 4 | August 2, 2015 | 1 | 2:06 | London, England | For the WFS Middleweight Championship. |
| Win | 16–4 | David Marcina | Submission (north-south choke) | Fusion Fight Night Series 1 | May 16, 2015 | 1 | 1:36 | Pardubice, Czech Republic | |
| Win | 15–4 | Carl Kinslow | Submission (north-south choke) | Ultimate Challenge MMA 43 | May 2, 2015 | 1 | 1:16 | London, England | Return to Light Heavyweight. Won the UCMMA Light Heavyweight Championship. |
| Win | 14–4 | Piotr Strus | Decision (unanimous) | MMAA Arena 3 | March 7, 2014 | 3 | 5:00 | Hradec Králové, Czech Republic | Defended the Czech MMAA Middleweight Championship. |
| Win | 13–4 | Marvin Campbell | Submission (kimura) | Ultimate Challenge MMA 38 | February 1, 2014 | 1 | 1:36 | London, England | Light Heavyweight bout; Campbell missed weight (215 lb). |
| Win | 12–4 | Tomáš Kužela | Submission (rear-naked choke) | GCF 26 | December 7, 2013 | 1 | 4:11 | Prague, Czech Republic | Won the GCF Middleweight Championship. |
| Win | 11–4 | Petr Kníže | Technical Submission (north-south choke) | MMAA Arena 2 | November 10, 2013 | 3 | 3:23 | Prague, Czech Republic | Won the Czech MMAA Middleweight Championship. |
| Win | 10–4 | Denniston Sutherland | Decision (unanimous) | Ultimate Challenge MMA 35 | August 3, 2013 | 3 | 5:00 | London, England | Won the UCMMA Middleweight Championship. |
| Loss | 9–4 | Caio Magalhães | Submission (rear-naked choke) | UFC on Fuel TV: Nogueira vs. Werdum | June 8, 2013 | 2 | 2:49 | Fortaleza, Brazil | |
| Loss | 9–3 | Francis Carmont | Submission (rear-naked choke) | UFC on Fuel TV: Munoz vs. Weidman | July 11, 2012 | 2 | 1:39 | San Jose, California, United States | |
| Win | 9–2 | Mike Massenzio | Submission (rear-naked choke) | UFC on Fox: Diaz vs. Miller | May 5, 2012 | 2 | 1:07 | East Rutherford, New Jersey, United States | Middleweight debut. |
| Loss | 8–2 | Ronny Markes | Decision (unanimous) | UFC Live: Hardy vs. Lytle | August 14, 2011 | 3 | 5:00 | Milwaukee, Wisconsin, United States | |
| Win | 8–1 | Seth Petruzelli | TKO (punches) | UFC 122 | November 13, 2010 | 1 | 3:46 | Oberhausen, Germany | Light Heavyweight debut. Knockout of the Night. |
| Loss | 7–1 | Jon Madsen | Decision (unanimous) | UFC 116 | July 3, 2010 | 3 | 5:00 | Las Vegas, Nevada, United States | |
| Win | 7–0 | Peter Yendall | KO (punches) | Ultimate Challenge MMA 10 | February 6, 2010 | 1 | 0:49 | London, England | |
| Win | 6–0 | Stav Economou | Submission (rear-naked choke) | Cage Fighters Championship 7 | July 4, 2009 | 1 | 1:57 | Purfleet, England | Won the CFC Heavyweight Championship. |
| Win | 5–0 | Ashley Pollard | Technical Submission (rear-naked choke) | Cage Fighters Championship 6 | April 25, 2009 | 1 | 0:36 | Purfleet, England | Defended CFC European Heavyweight Championship. |
| Win | 4–0 | Markus Hipp | TKO (punches) | Cage Fighters Championship 5 | March 7, 2009 | 1 | 0:15 | Brentwood, Essex, England | Won the inaugural CFC European Heavyweight Championship. |
| Win | 3–0 | Szilvester Silbont | Submission (rear-naked choke) | Cage Fighters Championship 4 | October 25, 2008 | 1 | 3:14 | Brentwood, England | |
| Win | 2–0 | Bill Georgitsis | TKO (punches) | Cage Fighters Championship 3 | May 18, 2008 | 1 | 0:05 | Rochester, England | |
| Win | 1–0 | Patric Carroll | Submission (rear-naked choke) | Cage Fighters Championship 2 | February 24, 2008 | 1 | 0:44 | Purfleet, England | Heavyweight debut. |

== Personal life ==
In July 2022, Vémola married his long-time girlfriend, Slovak Playboy model Lela Vémola (née Lenka Ceterová). The couple had been dating since 2017 and got engaged in 2020. They have two children together, a daughter named Lili (b. 2019) and son Rocky (b. 2021). Vémola also has two children from his previous relationship, son Karlos (b. 2010) and stepdaughter Sky (b. 2007). The family alternates between living in Prague and in London.

On the morning of December 23, 2025, he was detained at his home in Měchenice, Czechia, and in the evening hours, he was formally charged with international organized drug trafficking.

== TV appearance ==
In 2010, he appeared as a fictionalised version of himself in the controversial movie Killer Bitch.
