= UFC 128 =

UFC mixed martial arts event in 2011

UFC 128: Shogun vs Jones
- The poster for UFC 128: Shogun vs Jones
- Promotion: Ultimate Fighting Championship
- Date: March 19, 2011
- Venue: Prudential Center
- City: Newark, New Jersey
- Attendance: 12,619
- Total gate: $2,140,000

Event chronology
UFC Live: Sanchez vs. Kampmann	UFC 128: Shogun vs Jones	UFC Fight Night: Nogueira vs. Davis

UFC 128: Shogun vs. Jones was a mixed martial arts pay-per-view event held by the Ultimate Fighting Championship on March 19, 2011, at the Prudential Center in Newark, New Jersey.

== Background ==
This event was expected to take place in Abu Dhabi, the promotion's first return to the United Arab Emirates since UFC 112. However, the organization scrapped the idea after a suitable location for the event could not be finalized in time, since the temporary venue that hosted UFC 112 had been dismantled.

A bout between Tito Ortiz and Antônio Rogério Nogueira, was linked to this event, but was moved to headline UFC Fight Night 24.

A bout between Brendan Schaub and Frank Mir was expected for this event. However, Schaub ended up fighting Mirko Cro Cop.

A bout between Chael Sonnen and Yoshihiro Akiyama was briefly reported but Sonnen pleaded guilty to federal charges of money laundering and had his contract placed on hold by the UFC. Nate Marquardt was then signed to compete against Akiyama. However, on March 12, it was announced that Yoshihiro Akiyama had to pull out of his fight with Nate Marquardt due to the tragedy in Japan. Dana White then announced via Twitter that Dan Miller would be stepping up from the preliminary fights to replace Akiyama on the main card. Miller's original opponent Nick Catone instead faced UFC newcomer Costas Philippou in a 195-pound catchweight bout.

During Jon Jones' post-fight interview following his victory over Ryan Bader at UFC 126, Joe Rogan announced that Rashad Evans had injured his knee during training. Jones was then informed that the UFC wanted him to replace Evans in a fight against Maurício Rua in the main event for the UFC Light Heavyweight Championship. Jones accepted, and the fight was set for this event.

Quinton Jackson was originally offered the fight before Jon Jones. He declined the fight saying he would never take a fight with only a four-week notice. He also stated that he currently weighed 250 pounds and would have to lose 45 pounds in that four week time period and would not have time to actually train.

Karlos Vemola was scheduled to face Luiz Cane on the card, but Vemola was forced out of the fight with an injury. Eliot Marshall stepped in and replaced Vemola.

Manvel Gamburyan was scheduled to take on Raphael Assunção, but withdrew due to a back injury on February 25. Erik Koch stepped in and faced Assunção, as Koch's original opponent for the UFC on Versus 3 event two weeks prior to UFC 128, Cub Swanson, pulled out due to injury around the same time as Gamburyan.

UFC 128 featured two preliminary fights live on Spike TV, and on March 7, it was announced that the Almeida vs Pyle and Pellegrino vs Tibau fights would stream live on the UFC's official Facebook page.

Bruce Buffer announced that Mike Pyle defeated Ricardo Almeida by scores of 29–28, 30–27 and 30–27. However, the official scorecards showed that Pyle actually won the fight with scores of 29–28 across the board.

On March 17, Dana White announced on an episode of MMA Live that Rashad Evans would be offered the next light heavyweight title shot against the winner of the main event. Instead, Jones made his first title defense against Quinton Jackson on September 24, 2011, at UFC 135.

== Results ==
Main card
Weight class				Method	Round	Time	Notes
Light Heavyweight	Jon Jones	def.	Maurício Rua (c)	TKO (knees and punches)	3	2:37	(Note: For UFC Light Heavyweight Championship)
Bantamweight	Urijah Faber	def.	Eddie Wineland	Decision (unanimous) (29–28, 29–28, 29–28)	3	5:00
Lightweight	Jim Miller	def.	Kamal Shalorus	TKO (knee and punches)	3	2:15
Middleweight	Nate Marquardt	def.	Dan Miller	Decision (unanimous) (30–27, 30–27, 30–27)	3	5:00
Heavyweight	Brendan Schaub	def.	Mirko Cro Cop	KO (punch)	3	3:44
Preliminary card (Spike)
Light Heavyweight	Luiz Cané	def.	Eliot Marshall	TKO (punches)	1	2:15
Lightweight	Edson Barboza	def.	Anthony Njokuani	Decision (unanimous) (29–28, 29–28, 29–28)	3	5:00
Preliminary card (Facebook)
Welterweight	Mike Pyle	def.	Ricardo Almeida	Decision (unanimous) (29–28, 29–28, 29–28)	3	5:00
Lightweight	Gleison Tibau	def.	Kurt Pellegrino	Decision (split) (29–28, 28–29, 29–28)	3	5:00
Preliminary card
Bantamweight	Joseph Benavidez	def.	Ian Loveland	Decision (unanimous) (29–28, 30–27, 30–27)	3	5:00
Catchweight (195 lb)	Nick Catone	def.	Costas Philippou	Decision (unanimous) (30–27, 30–27, 30–27)	3	5:00
Featherweight	Erik Koch	def.	Raphael Assunção	KO (punch)	1	2:32	(Note: This bout aired on the Spike broadcast following the Marshall vs. Cane fight and the PPV broadcast following the Rua vs. Jones fight.)

== Bonus awards ==
The following fighters received $70,000 bonuses.

- Fight of the Night: Edson Barboza vs. Anthony Njokuani
- Knockout of the Night: Brendan Schaub and Erik Koch
- Submission of the Night: Not awarded as no matches ended by submission.
