= Seth Petruzelli =

American kickboxer, professional wrestler and mixed martial arts fighter

- Born: Seth Christopher Petruzelli; December 3, 1979 (age 46); Cape Coral, Florida, United States
- Other names: The Silverback
- Height: 6 ft 0 in (183 cm)
- Weight: 205 lb (93 kg; 14 st 9 lb)
- Division: Heavyweight; Light Heavyweight
- Reach: 75 in (191 cm)
- Fighting out of: Orlando, Florida, United States
- Team: The Jungle MMA and Fitness
- Rank: 3rd degree Black belt in Brazilian Jiu-Jitsu; 4th degree black belt in Shitō-ryū
- Years active: 2000–2013 (MMA)

Kickboxing record
- Total: 3
- Losses: 3
- By knockout: 3

Mixed martial arts record
- Total: 22
- Wins: 14
- By knockout: 12
- By submission: 1
- By decision: 1
- Losses: 8
- By knockout: 3
- By submission: 4
- By decision: 1

Other information
- Mixed martial arts record from Sherdog
- Last updated on: September 8, 2012

Seth Christopher Petruzelli (born December 3, 1979), nicknamed "The Silverback", is an American retired mixed martial artist, kickboxer, professional wrestler and entrepreneur. Petruzelli competed in the Heavyweight and Light Heavyweight divisions for the UFC, WEC, EliteXC, King of the Cage, BAMMA, and Bellator. On October 21, 2015, Petruzelli signed with professional wrestling promotion WWE, to work at their Performance Center as a striking coach. As of October 2017 he was wrestling for Major League Wrestling.

== Background ==
Petruzelli was born in Cape Coral, Florida and is a native of Fort Myers, Florida. He began training in karate at the age of seven and continued on training through high school. Petruzelli attended Bishop Verot High School as a freshman before transferring to Mariner High School to take advantage of the school's elite wrestling team. He also played football and ran in track and field. Petruzelli was a three-sport letterman all four years of high school and was also all-state center in football. Petruzelli was offered a scholarship to wrestle and play football in college but ended up turning professional in mixed martial arts right out of high school. He holds a 3rd degree black belt in Shitō-ryū karate and a Black belt in Brazilian jiu-jitsu. He eventually went on to study psychology at the University of Central Florida.

== Mixed martial arts career ==
Petruzelli was a member of the cast of the Ultimate Fighting Championship's The Ultimate Fighter 2 as a Heavyweight. He was eliminated in the semi-finals by Brad Imes after having defeated Dan Christison by unanimous decision in an elimination bout. He later had the opportunity to fight in the UFC in 2006, but was cut after losses to Matt Hamill and Wilson Gouveia.

=== EliteXC controversy ===
On October 4, 2008, at EliteXC: Heat, he defeated Kimbo Slice in 14 seconds by TKO. He was offered the fight on short notice after UFC Hall of Famer Ken Shamrock received a cut over his left eye in pre-fight practice and was forced to back out. Petruzelli was also outweighed by around 30 lbs. as he weighed in at the Light Heavyweight threshold of 205.5 and Slice at 234.5 lbs.

On October 10, 2008, six days after the fight with Slice, he told the radio show The Monsters in the Morning:

"The promoters kinda hinted to me and they gave me the money to stand and throw with him, they didn't want me to take him down. Let's just put it that way. It was worth my while to try and stand up, punch him."

EliteXC Vice President Jared Shaw immediately denied what could be perceived as them trying to fix the fight, and Petruzelli later clarified his statement telling respectively Yahoo! Sports and FiveOuncesofPain.com:

What that meant was they offer a knockout bonus, submission bonuses, fight of the night bonuses. I think it just got misconstrued. I wanted to have an exciting fight and I wanted the knock out bonus so I wanted to keep it standing. [...] They just said, ‘we want to see an exciting fight no matter what happens.’ I took it as I wanted the knockout bonus.

What was meant to be said was that I wanted to keep the fight standing for myself because I knew that was what the crowd, the promoters, and everyone wanted to see because that’s more exciting than just taking someone to the ground. That was my thing only. I wanted to keep it exciting so I decided to keep it standing. It had nothing to do with anybody else. That was all me.

On October 23, 2008, the Florida Department of Business and Professional Regulation concluded its investigation of the bout and found no wrongdoing.

=== 2008–2010 ===
In December 2008, Petruzelli opened "The Jungle MMA & Fitness" (http://jungleorlando.com) with Tom Lawlor and Mike Lee in Orlando, Fl. On August 22, 2009, Petruzelli fought in the Art Of Fighting 4 at the USF Sundome in Florida.

Petruzelli was expected to face MMA pioneer and former King of Pancrase Ken Shamrock on March 6, 2010 at an event called International Unlimited Fighting: The Return of Buluc but the fight was called off.

=== Return to the UFC ===
Petruzelli returned to the UFC at UFC 116 to face UFC newcomer Ricardo Romero. Despite having dominated the initial stages of the fight, Petruzelli lost by armbar submission and was visibly hurt.

Petruzelli stated via Twitter that his arm was not broken and it had just popped. He was given another fight by the UFC, and expressed excitement to face Tito Ortiz or Matt Hamill depending on whoever loses the fight. On November 13, he faced Karlos Vemola at UFC 122 in Oberhausen, Germany. He lost the fight via TKO (strikes) at 3:46 of the first round and was released from the promotion after dropping to 0–4 in the UFC.

=== Post-UFC Career ===
Petruzelli faced Dave Mewborn on April 22 serving as the Main Event for World Extreme Fighting 46 at the UCF Arena in Orlando Florida. He defeated Mewborn by TKO at 3:06 of the first round.

=== Bellator Fighting Championships ===
Petruzelli made his Bellator debut against Ricco Rodriguez at Bellator 48. He won the fight via KO in the first round. After the fight Petruzelli was rewarded with a BJJ black belt under Thiago Domingues (a De La Riva Blackbelt).

He returned in 2013 as a participant in the Bellator Season 7 Light Heavyweight tournament. He lost to Jacob Noe via TKO in the opening round at Bellator 85.

Petruzelli competed in Bellator's Light Heavyweight summer series tournament on Spike. He faced Muhammed Lawal in the opening round of a 4-man tournament at Bellator 96 on June 19, 2013 and lost via knockout in the first round. Following the loss Petruzelli announced his retirement from MMA.

== Championships and accomplishments ==
- Ultimate Fighting Championship
  - Fight of the Night (Two times)
- Ultimate Warrior Challenge
  - Ultimate Warrior Challenge
  - Knockout of the Night

== Kickboxing record ==
Kickboxing record
0 wins (0 KOs), 3 losses, 0 draws
Date	Result	Opponent	Event	Location	Method	Round	Time	Record
2012-09-08	Loss	(United States) Xavier Vigney	K-1 World Grand Prix 2012 in Los Angeles	Los Angeles, California, US	TKO (right knee)	2	1:17	0-3
2004-05-30	Loss	(Russia) Aleksandr Pitchkounov	Kyokushin vs K-1 2004 All Out Battle	Tokyo, Japan	TKO (corner stoppage)	2	2:18	0-2
2004-03-27	Loss	(United States) Bob Sapp	K-1 World Grand Prix 2004 in Saitama	Saitama, Japan	TKO (arm injury)	1	0:57	0-1
Legend: Win Loss Draw/No contest Notes

== Mixed martial arts record ==
Professional record breakdown
22 matches	14 wins	8 losses
By knockout	12	3
By submission	1	4
By decision	1	1

Res.	Record	Opponent	Method	Event	Date	Round	Time	Location	Notes
Loss	14–8	Muhammed Lawal	KO (punch)	Bellator 96	June 19, 2013	1	1:35	Thackerville, Oklahoma, United States	Bellator 2013 Summer Series Light Heavyweight Tournament Semifinal.
Loss	14–7	Jacob Noe	TKO (punches)	Bellator 85	January 17, 2013	1	2:51	Irvine, California, United States	Bellator Season 8 Light Heavyweight Tournament Quarterfinal.
Win	14–6	Ricco Rodriguez	KO (punches)	Bellator 48	August 20, 2011	1	4:21	Uncasville, Connecticut, United States	Catchweight (230 lb) bout.
Win	13–6	Dave Mewborn	TKO (punches)	World Extreme Fighting 46	April 22, 2011	1	3:06	Orlando, Florida, United States	
Loss	12–6	Karlos Vémola	TKO (punches)	UFC 122	November 13, 2010	1	3:46	Oberhausen, Germany	
Loss	12–5	Ricardo Romero	Submission (straight armbar)	UFC 116	July 3, 2010	2	3:05	Las Vegas, Nevada, United States	
Win	12–4	Ryan White	Submission (armbar)	BAMMA 3	May 15, 2010	1	1:07	Birmingham, England	
Win	11–4	Chris Baten	TKO (punches)	Art of Fighting 4: Damage	August 22, 2009	1	2:23	Tampa, Florida, United States	
Win	10–4	Kimbo Slice	TKO (punches)	EliteXC: Heat	October 4, 2008	1	0:14	Sunrise, Florida, United States	Heavyweight bout.
Win	9–4	Sean Sallee	TKO	Knight Fight	October 27, 2007	1	2:58	Orlando, Florida, United States	
Loss	8–4	Wilson Gouveia	Submission (guillotine choke)	UFC Fight Night: Stevenson vs. Guillard	April 5, 2007	2	0:39	Las Vegas, Nevada, United States	Fight of the Night.
Win	8–3	Bernard Rutherford	KO (punches)	Ultimate Warrior Challenge	February 2, 2007	1	1:47	Jacksonville, Florida, United States	Knockout of the Night.
Loss	7–3	Matt Hamill	Decision (unanimous)	UFC: Ortiz vs. Shamrock 3: The Final Chapter	October 10, 2006	3	5:00	Hollywood, Florida, United States	Light Heavyweight debut. Fight of the Night.
Win	7–2	Dan Severn	Decision (unanimous)	KOTC 32: Bringing Heat	January 24, 2004	3	5:00	Miami, Florida, United States	
Win	6–2	Brian Hawkins	TKO (punches)	KOTC 21: Invasion	February 21, 2003	1	2:21	Albuquerque, New Mexico, United States	
Win	5–2	Rocky Batastini	TKO (punches)	KOTC 18: Sudden Impact	November 1, 2002	1	4:04	Reno, Nevada, United States	
Win	4–2	Mike Ward	TKO (doctor stoppage)	Cage Wars 1	December 23, 2001	1	2:50	Portsmouth, England	
Win	3–2	Keith Fielder	TKO (corner stoppage)	RSF 6: Mayhem in Myers	December 29, 2001	1	2:10	Fort Myers, Florida, United States	
Win	2–2	Victor Majuskaus	TKO (slam and punches)	WVF: Battlejax	November 10, 2001	1	0:29	Jacksonville, Florida, United States	
Loss	1–2	Gan McGee	Submission (heel hook)	WEC 1	June 30, 2001	1	1:25	Lemoore, California, United States	
Loss	1–1	Mario Neto	Submission (rear-naked choke)	World Vale Tudo Championship	June 9, 2001	1	17:36	Recife, Brazil	
Win	1–0	Nate Robinson	KO (punch)	WVF: Battlejax	August 26, 2000	1	1:29	Jacksonville, Florida, United States	

== Personal life ==
Petruzelli was first married for around 18 months. He and his first wife divorced after conflicts over business and his continuing to fight.

Petruzelli then married Traci, and they have a daughter together.
