= Eliot Marshall =

American mixed martial arts fighter

- Born: Eliot Andrew Marshall; July 7, 1980 (age 46); Franklinville, New Jersey, U.S.
- Other names: The Fire
- Height: 6 ft 3 in (1.91 m)
- Weight: 205 lb (93 kg; 14.6 st)
- Division: Light Heavyweight
- Reach: 77 in (200 cm)
- Fighting out of: Boulder, Colorado
- Team: Team Elevation; Grudge Training Center
- Rank: Black belt in Brazilian Jiu-Jitsu under Amal Easton

Mixed martial arts record
- Total: 14
- Wins: 10
- By knockout: 1
- By submission: 5
- By decision: 4
- Losses: 4
- By knockout: 2
- By decision: 2

Other information
- Mixed martial arts record from Sherdog

Eliot Andrew Marshall (born July 7, 1980) is a retired American mixed martial artist. He was a cast member on SpikeTV's The Ultimate Fighter: Team Nogueira vs. Team Mir.

== Background ==
Marshall grew up in the Franklinville section of Franklin Township, Gloucester County, New Jersey and attended Delsea Regional High School. Influenced by Karate Kid, Marshall started practising Soo Bahk Do at the age of six, eventually placing second in the national championships and being promoted to 3rd degree black belt in the sport. Marshall started training jiu-jitsu in 1999 after moving to Colorado to attend the University of Colorado from where he graduated with a degree in mathematics.

== Mixed martial arts career ==
=== The Ultimate Fighter ===
Eliot appeared on season 8 of The Ultimate Fighter. To be a castmember for the rest of the season he had to win his bout against Karn Grigoryan in the elimination round. Eliot lost the fight via a controversial split decision that shocked all spectators leaving many to believe that the judges thought Marshall was Grigoryan. Before Eliot left it was announced that a few fighters would be unable to continue onto the show, with Karn being one of them. Needing a replacement, Eliot was given a second chance.

He had his second fight in the house against Shane Primm, he defeated Primm by rear naked choke early in the first round. After the match, Eliot called out future opponent and TUF winner Ryan Bader.

Eliot got his match against Bader, but lost the fight by unanimous decision.

=== Ultimate Fighting Championship ===
Eliot defeated Jules Bruchez, his former castmate on The Ultimate Fighter, at the TUF 8 Finale.

His next fight was against Vinicius Magalhães at UFC 97, whom he defeated by unanimous decision.

He fought Jason Brilz on September 19, 2009 at UFC 103 in a closely contested bout, winning by controversial split decision.

Marshall then faced former IFL Light Heavyweight Champion Vladimir Matyushenko on March 21, 2010 at UFC LIVE: Vera vs. Jones. Marshall lost a split decision (30-27, 28–29, 30–27).

Following his loss to Matyushenko, Marshall was released from the promotion along with UFC veteran Shannon Gugerty.

=== Post UFC ===
Despite his cut from the UFC, he was featured in the countdown show for UFC 111: St-Pierre vs Hardy from the camp of then-Interim Heavyweight Championship challenger Shane Carwin.

Eliot Marshall was expected to face Chris McNally at the Nemesis Fighting: MMA Global Invasion at the Hard rock in Punta Cana, Dominican Republic, but event was postponed to avoid a storm. The fight was rescheduled for December 10, 2010.

=== Return to the UFC ===
Marshall faced Luiz Cané on March 19, 2011 at UFC 128, replacing an injured Karlos Vemola. He lost the fight via TKO in the first round.

Marshall fought Brandon Vera on October 29, 2011 at UFC 137, losing a unanimous decision.

After the loss to Vera, Marshall was released by the UFC and later announced his retirement from MMA competition.

== Personal life ==
Eliot and his wife Renee have two sons. After retiring from professional competition, Eliot took over the head coach position of Team Elevation with notable students like two-time UFC Bantamweight champion TJ Dillashaw, Curtis Blaydes, Alistair Overeem, Neil Magny, Cory Sandhagen among others.

== Mixed martial arts record ==
Professional record breakdown
14 matches	10 wins	4 losses
By knockout	1	2
By submission	5	0
By decision	4	2

Res.	Record	Opponent	Method	Event	Date	Round	Time	Location	Notes
Loss	10–4	Brandon Vera	Decision (unanimous)	UFC 137	October 29, 2011	3	5:00	Las Vegas, Nevada, United States	
Loss	10–3	Luiz Cané	TKO (punches)	UFC 128	March 19, 2011	1	2:15	Newark, New Jersey, United States	
Win	10–2	Chris McNally	Submission (armbar)	Nemesis Fighting: MMA Global Invasion	December 10, 2010	1	N/A	Punta Cana, Dominican Republic	
Win	9–2	Adriano Camolese	Decision (unanimous)	BTT MMA 1: Someone's Going Down	September 11, 2010	3	5:00	Denver, Colorado, United States	
Win	8–2	Josh Haynes	Decision (unanimous)	ROF 39: Summer Brawl 2	August 27, 2010	3	5:00	Denver, Colorado, United States	
Loss	7–2	Vladimir Matyushenko	Decision (split)	UFC Live: Vera vs. Jones	March 21, 2010	3	5:00	Broomfield, Colorado, United States	
Win	7–1	Jason Brilz	Decision (split)	UFC 103	September 19, 2009	3	5:00	Dallas, Texas, United States	
Win	6–1	Vinny Magalhães	Decision (unanimous)	UFC 97	April 18, 2009	3	5:00	Montreal, Quebec, Canada	
Win	5–1	Jules Bruchez	Submission (rear-naked choke)	The Ultimate Fighter: Team Nogueira vs Team Mir Finale	December 13, 2008	1	1:27	Las Vegas, Nevada, United States	
Loss	4–1	Rob MacDonald	TKO (punches)	ROF 31: Undisputed	December 1, 2007	2	1:41	Broomfield, Colorado, United States	
Win	4–0	Marcus Sursa	Submission (rear-naked choke)	ROF 29: Aftershock	April 28, 2007	2	4:59	Broomfield, Colorado, United States	
Win	3–0	Damir Mihajlovic	TKO (punches)	ROF 28: Evolution	February 16, 2007	1	3:57	Broomfield, Colorado, United States	
Win	2–0	Dan Green	Submission (rear-naked choke)	ROF 27: Collision Course	December 9, 2006	1	0:46	Denver, Colorado, United States	
Win	1–0	Mike Altman	Submission (keylock)	ROF 24: Integrity	June 17, 2006	1	2:02	Castle Rock, Colorado, United States	
