= Kris McCray =

American mixed martial arts fighter

- Born: Kris Eric Johannes McCray; September 24, 1981 (age 45); Schweinfurt, West Germany
- Other names: Savage
- Nationality: American
- Height: 6 ft 0 in (1.83 m)
- Weight: 185 lb (84 kg; 13.2 st)
- Division: Welterweight (2010-2012, 2015); Middleweight (2008-2010, 2013)
- Reach: 71.0 in (180 cm)
- Fighting out of: Toms River, New Jersey, United States
- Team: Renzo Gracie Combat Team
- Rank: Blue Belt in Brazilian Jiu-Jitsu
- Years active: 2008-2015

Mixed martial arts record
- Total: 14
- Wins: 9
- By knockout: 1
- By submission: 5
- By decision: 3
- Losses: 5
- By submission: 2
- By decision: 3

Other information
- Mixed martial arts record from Sherdog

Kris Eric Johannes McCray (born September 24, 1981) is an American Former mixed martial artist. He was the runner-up of The Ultimate Fighter: Team Liddell vs. Team Ortiz.

== Background ==
McCray was born in Germany to Calvin and Barbara McCray as the middle child in between his two brothers, Dominic and Thomas. He is of African American, Austrian and Mexican descent.

Since his father was in the Army and stationed in Germany, McCray lived there, as well as Alabama, for most of his early childhood. He eventually moved to Woodbridge, Virginia, where he graduated from high school at Woodbridge High School in 1998.

McCray attended college at George Mason University, while he was teaching high school wrestling in his spare time. McCray entered the U.S. Army Reserve at age 21, and spent six years in the service.

== Mixed martial arts career ==
Beginning at age 7, McCray began learning Taekwondo and Karate. In high school, McCray was a part of the Wrestling team. During his time in the service, McCray began learning Brazilian Jiu-Jitsu, and upon returning home, he joined Team Gold Medal Grappling, a Lloyd Irvin affiliate.

McCray obtained a perfect 10–0 amateur record before turning pro. His pro career has mainly consisted of fights for the Virginia based promotion, Ultimate Warrior Challenge.

=== The Ultimate Fighter ===
McCray was selected as a contestant for the eleventh season of the Ultimate Fighter. Before he could move into the house, McCray had to win his entry fight against Cleburn Walker, where he won via a verbal submission after injuring Walker's shoulder.

He was selected third and fifth overall by Team Punishment, led by Tito Ortiz. For his second fight he was chosen to fight Josh Bryant. The fight was back and forth and after three rounds, Bryant was awarded the decision.

McCray was then selected as one of the season's wildcards. He then faced Kyacey Uscola in a second chance to get into the quarter-finals. In the second round, having controlled a large portion of the fight, McCray was able to submit Uscola with an americana and advanced to the quarter-finals.

McCray would then face good friend Kyle Noke. McCray arguably controlled the fight after succeeding in multiple takedown attempts that Noke had little answer to. Noke's submission attempts were also effectively neutralised and McCray pulled off the victory with a unanimous decision after three rounds.

That win advanced McCray into the semi-finals where he would have a rematch with Josh Bryant who had defeated him earlier in the competition. After winning by unanimous decision, McCray moved on to face Court McGee in the finals to determine the next Ultimate Fighter.

McCray set the new record for total fights competed in during a season, having fought five times in total. Dana White commented during the final episode that McCray had fought "literally every Tuesday" since he got in the house.

This advanced him to the TUF 11 finale where he faced Team Liddell fighter, Court McGee in the main event.

=== Ultimate Fighting Championship ===
At the finale, McCray lost to McGee via second round submission by way of a rear-naked choke. McCray was out-wrestled in the first and second round eventually giving up his back in the second round. McCray signed a four-fight deal with the UFC.

His first fight on the contract took place at UFC 122 in the Welterweight division. McCray faced UFC newcomer Carlos Eduardo Rocha, and lost by kneebar submission in the first round. He moved his camp from Team Gold Medal Grappling in Washington, D.C., to Toms River, New Jersey, with the Renzo Gracie Combat Team.

McCray fought John Hathaway on March 26, 2011, at UFC Fight Night 24. The fight was closely contested throughout. However, Hathaway walked away the winner via split decision.

Following the loss to Hathaway, McCray was released from the organization.

=== Bellator Fighting Championship ===
McCray signed with Bellator and made his debut on April 13, 2012 at Bellator 65. He faced Ailton Barbosa and won the bout via split decision.

== Personal life ==
McCray became a father to a daughter at age 15. According to his Twitter account, McCray is married.

== Mixed martial arts record ==
Professional record breakdown
14 matches	9 wins	5 losses
By knockout	1	0
By submission	5	2
By decision	3	3

Res.	Record	Opponent	Method	Event	Date	Round	Time	Location	Notes
Win	9–5	Billy Ward	Submission (guillotine choke)	Strike Off 6: Battle of Warriors	October 3, 2015	1	0:52	Fairfax, Virginia, United States	
Loss	8–5	Danillo Villefort	Decision (split)	World Series of Fighting 2	March 23, 2013	3	5:00	Atlantic City, New Jersey, United States	Return to Middleweight
Loss	8–4	Mike Wade	Decision (split)	CFFC: Wade vs. McCray	October 27, 2012	3	5:00	Richmond, Virginia, United States	
Win	8–3	Ailton Barbosa	Decision (split)	Bellator 65	April 13, 2012	3	5:00	Atlantic City, New Jersey, United States	
Win	7–3	Gemiyale Adkins	Decision (unanimous)	Cage Fight 9	November 25, 2011	3	5:00	Scranton, Pennsylvania, United States	
Win	6–3	Kevin Nowaczyk	Decision (unanimous)	HFC 9: Fall Brawl	November 5, 2011	3	5:00	Valparaiso, Indiana, United States	
Loss	5–3	John Hathaway	Decision (split)	UFC Fight Night: Nogueira vs. Davis	March 26, 2011	3	5:00	Seattle, Washington, United States	
Loss	5–2	Carlos Eduardo Rocha	Submission (kneebar)	UFC 122	November 13, 2010	1	2:21	Oberhausen, Germany	Welterweight Debut
Loss	5–1	Court McGee	Submission (rear-naked choke)	The Ultimate Fighter 11 Finale	June 19, 2010	2	3:41	Las Vegas, Nevada, United States	The Ultimate Fighter: Team Liddell vs. Team Ortiz Middleweight tournament final.
Win	5–0	Marcus Ajian	Submission (shoulder lock)	Ballroom Battleground 1	November 4, 2009	1	0:45	Glen Burnie, Maryland, United States	
Win	4–0	Igor Almeida	TKO (punches)	UWC 7: Redemption	October 3, 2009	1	0:39	Fairfax, Virginia, United States	
Win	3–0	Ronnie West	Submission (rear-naked choke)	UWC 6: Capital Punishment	April 25, 2009	1	0:39	Fairfax, Virginia, United States	
Win	2–0	Manny Okorie	Submission (rear-naked choke)	UWC 5: Man O' War	February 21, 2009	1	4:51	Fairfax, Virginia, United States	
Win	1–0	Joey Kirwan	Submission (rear-naked choke)	UWC 4: Confrontation	October 11, 2008	1	1:35	Fairfax, Virginia, United States	
