= Will Ribeiro =

Brazilian mixed martial artist (born 1983)

Will Marcos Pessoa Ribeiro
- Born: February 17, 1983 (age 43); Campo Grande, Rio de Janeiro, Brazil
- Height: 5 ft 8 in (1.73 m)
- Weight: 135 lb (61 kg; 9.6 st)
- Division: Bantamweight
- Reach: 69 in (180 cm)
- Team: Black House; Academia Boxe Thai
- Rank: Olympian Boxing; Black belt in Muay Thai under Luiz Alves; Purple belt in Taekwondo; Brown belt in Luta Livre; Purple belt in Brazilian Jiu-Jitsu under Antônio Rodrigo Nogueira
- Years active: 2003–2009

Mixed martial arts record
- Total: 12
- Wins: 10
- By knockout: 5
- By submission: 2
- By decision: 3
- Losses: 2
- By submission: 1
- By decision: 1

Other information
- Mixed martial arts record from Sherdog
- Last updated on: 8 de março de 2011

Will Ribeiro (born February 17, 1983) is a retired Brazilian mixed martial artist and Luta Livre Esportiva (brown belt) practitioner, fighting out of Rio de Janeiro, Brazil.

== Biography ==
Born in Campo Grande, a suburb of the city of Rio de Janeiro Will Ribeiro was raised along with his three siblings by his grandfather and mother, never having known their father. After the passing of their mother, Will and his family had to struggle to stay afloat, and the then 20-year-old Ribeiro took a career as a prizefighter to help support his family.

Will, who begun his training as a boxer in the age of 17, soon started to draw attention for his achievements in the sport, winning five straight titles in the state of Rio de Janeiro, also winning important titles such as the Copa Brasil de Boxe and the Torneio de São Paulo Eder Jofre. Ribeiro was then chosen as part of the Brazilian Olympic boxing team, in Santo André, São Paulo.

== Mixed martial arts career ==
After making waves at fight events in Brazil, and quickly becoming a bantamweight prospect in MMA, including the Brazilian chapter of Shooto, Will Ribeiro was signed by World Extreme Cagefighting, debuting against the American Chase Beebe, and winning by a split decision. Afterwards, Will faced bantamweight standout Brian Bowles, being defeated by submission due to a guillotine choke in the third round. Will was a solid part of many rankings of his division, and was ranked the 9th top bantamweight fighter by Sherdog.

== Injury and rehabilitation ==
On December 16, 2008, Ribeiro was critically injured while riding on the back of a motorcycle on rain-slick wet roads without a helmet. He was in a hospital in a comatose state and has lost vision in one eye. Doctors gave him a 50/50 chance of ever waking from the coma. By December 23, doctors reported that he had not awoken from the coma, but that his condition was improving. This very unfortunate incident has effectively ended Ribeiro's Mixed Martial Arts career. At the time of his accident Will was ranked as the #7 Bantamweight fighter in the world by the MMAWeekly Worldwide MMA Ranking System.

Will Ribeiro has reportedly awoken from an induced coma and is recovering well after being hospitalized since December. According to Tatame.com, Luiz Alves, Ribeiro’s Muay Thai coach, recently visited him in the hospital and was surprised to see that Ribeiro was able to talk to him and is currently undergoing therapy after doctors stated he had a 50-50 chance to live due to his injuries suffered in the accident.

As of September 2010, Ribeiro is still recovering from his near fatal injuries.

In December 2010, a Shooto Brazil event was held, with all of its earnings going towards Will Ribeiro's treatment. The representative of Shooto Brazil, André Pederneiras, decided to hold the event to raise funds towards Will's cranioplasty surgery. In May 2011, Will underwent a successfully cranioplasty surgery. Ribeiro is back to the fighting world, acting as a boxing instructor and a cageside referee. Will Ribeiro also works with social projects in the city of Rio de Janeiro, teaching boxing lessons for impoverished youth.

== Mixed martial arts record ==
Professional record breakdown
12 matches	10 wins	2 losses
By knockout	5	0
By submission	2	1
By decision	3	1

Res.	Record	Opponent	Method	Event	Date	Round	Time	Location	Notes
Loss	10–2	Brian Bowles	Submission (guillotine choke)	WEC 37: Torres vs. Tapia	December 3, 2008	3	1:11	Las Vegas, Nevada, United States	
Win	10–1	Chase Beebe	Decision (split)	WEC 34: Faber vs. Pulver	June 1, 2008	3	5:00	Sacramento, California, United States	
Win	9–1	Andre Lobo	KO (punches)	Shooto - Brazil 5	January 26, 2008	1	0:09	Rio de Janeiro, Brazil	
Win	8–1	William Vianna	KO (punch)	Shooto - Brazil 4	October 27, 2007	3	N/A	Rio de Janeiro, Brazil	
Win	7–1	D'Angelo de Souza Vieira	KO (knee to the body)	Conquista Fight 3	May 12, 2007	1	0:16	Brazil	
Loss	6–1	Erinaldo Pitbull	Decision (unanimous)	Shooto - Brazil 11	March 24, 2007	3	5:00	Rio de Janeiro, Brazil	
Win	6–0	D'Angelo de Souza Vieira	Decision (split)	Top Fighter MMA 2	October 25, 2006	3	5:00	Rio de Janeiro, Brazil	
Win	5–0	Daniel Siqueira	KO (punches)	Juiz de Fora - Fight 3	April 8, 2006	1	N/A	Brazil	
Win	4–0	Washington dos Anjos	Submission (punches)	Submission PC: Pantanal Combat	February 10, 2006	2	2:01	Brazil	
Win	3–0	Luis Rogerio de Agostinho	TKO (upkick to the body)	Minotauro Fights 1	May 21, 2005	1	4:00	Macapá, Amapa, Brazil	
Win	2–0	Dini Dini	Decision (unanimous)	IMVT - Iron Man Vale Tudo	January 10, 2004	3	5:00	Macapá, Amapa, Brazil	
Win	1–0	Gabriel Barros	Submission (side choke)	Conquista Fight 1	December 20, 2003	2	4:05	Vitoria da Conquista, Bahia, Brazil	
