= UFC 97 =

UFC mixed martial arts event in 2009

UFC 97: Redemption
- The poster for UFC 97: Redemption
- Promotion: Ultimate Fighting Championship
- Date: April 18, 2009
- Venue: Bell Centre
- City: Montreal, Quebec, Canada
- Attendance: 21,451
- Total gate: $4,900,000
- Buyrate: 650,000

Event chronology
UFC Fight Night: Condit vs. Kampmann	UFC 97: Redemption	UFC 98: Evans vs. Machida

UFC 97: Redemption (not to be confused with UFC 17: Redemption) was a mixed martial arts event held by the Ultimate Fighting Championship (UFC) on April 18, 2009, in Montreal, Quebec, Canada.

== Background ==
This event broke the UFC attendance record that was set 364 days earlier in Montreal at UFC 83.

Due to time constraints, the preliminary bout between Sam Stout and Matt Wiman was moved to the main card, resulting in a six-fight live main card.

== Sanctioning and rules controversy ==
On February 12, 2009, reports surfaced that province regulators ("Régie des alcools, des courses et des jeux", or RACJ) requested a set of rule changes that differ from the Unified Rules of MMA put the event at risk from taking place. The proposed rule changes banned elbow and knee strikes, mandated a smaller cage, and would stop a fight when a fighter gets knocked down. Before, the RACJ has followed the Unified Rules, but as laws differ by city, state, or province, a commission can insist on the usage of its own rules.

On February 18, 2009, it was announced that UFC officials were able to convince the RACJ to reverse its stand and use the Unified Rules. As a concession, the UFC agreed to the banning of foot stomps for this event.

== Results ==
Main card (PPV)
Weight class				Method	Round	Time	Notes
Middleweight	Anderson Silva (c)	def.	Thales Leites	Decision (unanimous) (49–46, 48–47, 50–46)	5	5:00	(Note: For the UFC Middleweight Championship.)
Lightweight	Sam Stout	def.	Matt Wiman	Decision (unanimous) (29–28, 29–28, 29–28)	3	5:00
Light Heavyweight	Maurício Rua	def.	Chuck Liddell	TKO (punches)	1	4:28
Light Heavyweight	Krzysztof Soszynski	def.	Brian Stann	Submission (kimura)	1	3:53
Heavyweight	Cheick Kongo	def.	Antoni Hardonk	TKO (punches)	2	2:29
Light Heavyweight	Luiz Cane	def.	Steve Cantwell	Decision (unanimous) (30–27, 30–27, 29–28)	3	5:00
Preliminary card
Middleweight	Denis Kang	def.	Xavier Foupa-Pokam	Decision (unanimous) (30–27, 30–27, 30–27)	3	5:00
Middleweight	Nate Quarry	def.	Jason MacDonald	TKO (elbows)	1	2:27
Middleweight	Ed Herman	def.	David Loiseau	Decision (unanimous) (30–26, 30–27, 30–27)	3	5:00
Catchweight (157)	Mark Bocek	def.	David Bielkheden	Submission (rear-naked choke)	1	4:57	(Note: Bielkheden did not make the 156 pound lightweight limit, weighing in at 157 pounds.)
Welterweight	T. J. Grant	def.	Ryo Chonan	Decision (split) (30–27, 28–29, 29–28)	3	5:00
Light Heavyweight	Eliot Marshall	def.	Vinny Magalhães	Decision (unanimous) (29–28, 30–27, 30–27)	3	5:00

== Bonus awards ==
The following fighters received $70,000 bonuses.

- Fight of the Night: Sam Stout vs. Matt Wiman
- Knockout of the Night: Maurício Rua
- Submission of the Night: Krzysztof Soszynski

== See also ==
- Ultimate Fighting Championship
- List of UFC champions
- List of UFC events
- 2009 in UFC
