= UFC 122 =

UFC mixed martial arts event in 2010

UFC 122: Marquardt vs. Okami
- The poster for UFC 122: Marquardt vs. Okami
- Promotion: Ultimate Fighting Championship
- Date: November 13, 2010
- Venue: König Pilsener Arena
- City: Oberhausen, Germany
- Attendance: 8,421
- Total gate: $600,000

Event chronology
UFC 121: Lesnar vs. Velasquez	UFC 122: Marquardt vs. Okami	UFC 123: Rampage vs. Machida

UFC 122: Marquardt vs. Okami was a mixed martial arts event held by the Ultimate Fighting Championship on November 13, 2010, at König Pilsener Arena in Oberhausen, Germany. This event aired on the same day, via tape delay, on Spike TV in the U.S.

== Background ==
This was the UFC's second event in Germany and second in continental Europe. The sport has been met with severe criticism by German media, which led to the banning of minors from the first German UFC event (UFC 99).

The sport itself was actually banned from broadcast altogether in Germany in March 2010 due to the "extent of violence [being] shown to be unacceptable." Regardless, UFC combated the opposition, after stating: "Not getting TV isn't going to stop us; we're going to keep going. We can't get into Ontario; we're opening an office there. It doesn't bother us."

Vitor Belfort was set to face Yushin Okami in the main event, with the winner receiving a middleweight title shot. However, on September 21, 2010, Belfort withdrew from the fight to face Anderson Silva. Nate Marquardt ended up fighting Yushin Okami in the main event, which would still determine the next #1 contender.

Vladimir Matyushenko was scheduled to face Jason Brilz at this event, but Brilz was forced off the card on October 6 with a back injury and replaced by Alexandre Ferreira. The Matyushenko/Brilz matchup was rescheduled for UFC 129 in April 2011.

Pascal Krauss was expected to make his promotional debut against fellow newcomer Kenny Robertson, but Robertson was forced from the card with an injury on October 13. Mark Scanlon replaced Robertson.

An illness forced Alessio Sakara out of his co-main event bout with Jorge Rivera while the preliminary fights were taking place. The fight was scrapped from the card. As a result, the Ludwig vs. Osipczak bout was promoted to first fight on the main card.

The event averaged 2.2 million viewers on Spike TV which drew a higher average rating than UFC 120 which drew 1.9 million viewers.

== Results ==
Main Card
Weight class				Method	Round	Time	Notes
Middleweight	Yushin Okami	def.	Nate Marquardt	Decision (unanimous) (29–28, 30–27, 29–28)	3	5:00
Lightweight	Dennis Siver	def.	Andre Winner	Submission (rear-naked choke)	1	3:37
Welterweight	Amir Sadollah	def.	Peter Sobotta	Decision (unanimous) (30–27, 30–27, 30–27)	3	5:00
Light Heavyweight	Krzysztof Soszynski	def.	Goran Reljic	Decision (unanimous) (30–27, 30–27, 30–27)	3	5:00
Welterweight	Duane Ludwig	def.	Nick Osipczak	Decision (split) (28–30, 29–28, 29–28)	3	5:00
Preliminary card
Weight class				Method	Round	Time	Notes
Light Heavyweight	Vladimir Matyushenko	def.	Alexandre Ferreira	TKO (punches and elbows)	1	2:20
Welterweight	Pascal Krauss	def.	Mark Scanlon	Decision (unanimous) (30–27, 30–27, 30–27)	3	5:00
Middleweight	Kyle Noke	def.	Rob Kimmons	Submission (rear-naked choke)	2	1:33
Light Heavyweight	Karlos Vemola	def.	Seth Petruzelli	TKO (punches)	1	3:46
Welterweight	Carlos Eduardo Rocha	def.	Kris McCray	Submission (kneebar)	1	2:21

== Bonus awards ==
The following fighters received $60,000 bonuses.

- Fight of the Night: Pascal Krauss vs. Mark Scanlon
- Knockout of the Night: Karlos Vemola
- Submission of the Night: Dennis Siver

== See also ==
- Ultimate Fighting Championship
- List of UFC champions
- List of UFC events
- 2010 in UFC
