= UFC 116 =

UFC mixed martial arts event in 2010

UFC 116: Lesnar vs. Carwin
- The poster for UFC 116: Lesnar vs. Carwin
- Promotion: Ultimate Fighting Championship
- Date: July 3, 2010
- Venue: MGM Grand Garden Arena
- City: Las Vegas, Nevada
- Attendance: 12,790
- Total gate: $4,053,990
- Buyrate: 1,160,000

Event chronology
The Ultimate Fighter: Team Liddell vs. Team Ortiz Finale	UFC 116: Lesnar vs. Carwin	UFC Live: Jones vs. Matyushenko

UFC 116: Lesnar vs. Carwin was a mixed martial arts event held by the Ultimate Fighting Championship on July 3, 2010, at the MGM Grand Garden Arena in Las Vegas, Nevada. The show was voted as the Best Major Show in the 2010 Wrestling Observer Newsletter Awards, the first and only time an mixed martial arts and UFC show won the award.

== Background ==
Shane Carwin, who won the Interim Heavyweight Championship by defeating Frank Mir at UFC 111, faced current heavyweight champion Brock Lesnar. The two were originally set to face each other at UFC 106, then UFC 108, before Carwin won the interim heavyweight championship, but Lesnar pulled out of the fight both times due to an illness (diverticulitis) that kept him from training.

Cheick Kongo was scheduled to face Roy Nelson, but a back injury sidelined Kongo. Nelson fought Junior dos Santos at UFC 117.

Alessio Sakara was set to fight Nate Marquardt, but Sakara pulled out of the bout after the death of his father.

Jacob Volkmann was scheduled to fight Paul Kelly as one of the preliminary fights, but Kelly reportedly had to pull out of the July 3 fight due to visa issues. The bout was rescheduled for UFC Live: Jones vs. Matyushenko the next month.

Also, UFC newcomer Ricardo Romero was scheduled to fight Steve Cantwell after Cantwell's recent medical ban ended. However, the fight was cancelled for unknown reasons and Cantwell was replaced by UFC returnee Seth Petruzelli.

On June 17, 2010, Julio Paulino was injured and withdrew from his fight against Daniel Roberts. Forrest Petz returned to the UFC and replaced Paulino.

On June 22, 2010, Wanderlei Silva had to withdraw from his co-main event fight against Yoshihiro Akiyama due to three broken ribs and an injured right knee. Akiyama was then matched against Chris Leben.

The bout between Kendall Grove and Goran Reljic was originally slated for the live prelims show on Spike TV. However, it was later demoted and replaced by Seth Petruzelli vs. Ricardo Romero because of Grove's criticism of the Spike TV network and The Ultimate Fighter television show.

UFC President Dana White confirmed that the winner of the heavyweight title fight will defend the title against the undefeated Cain Velasquez.

UFC 116 won Best Major Show in the 2010 Wrestling Observer Newsletter awards.

== Results ==
Main card
Weight class				Method	Round	Time	Notes
Heavyweight	Brock Lesnar (c)	def.	Shane Carwin (ic)	Submission (arm-triangle choke)	2	2:19	(Note: For the UFC Heavyweight Championship.)
Middleweight	Chris Leben	def.	Yoshihiro Akiyama	Submission (triangle choke)	3	4:40
Welterweight	Chris Lytle	def.	Matt Brown	Submission (inverted triangle choke and straight armbar)	2	2:02
Light Heavyweight	Stephan Bonnar	def.	Krzysztof Soszynski	TKO (knee and punches)	2	3:08
Lightweight	George Sotiropoulos	def.	Kurt Pellegrino	Decision (unanimous) (30–27, 30–27, 29–28)	3	5:00
Televised
Heavyweight	Brendan Schaub	def.	Chris Tuchscherer	TKO (punches)	1	1:07
Light Heavyweight	Ricardo Romero	def.	Seth Petruzelli	Submission (armbar)	2	3:05
Preliminary card
Middleweight	Kendall Grove	def.	Goran Reljic	Decision (split) (28–29, 30–27, 29–28)	3	5:00
Middleweight	Gerald Harris	def.	David Branch	KO (slam)	3	2:35
Welterweight	Daniel Roberts	def.	Forrest Petz	Decision (split) (28–29, 29–28, 29–28)	3	5:00
Heavyweight	Jon Madsen	def.	Karlos Vemola	Decision (unanimous) (30–27, 30–27, 30–27)	3	5:00

== Bonus awards ==
The following fighters received $75,000 bonuses.

- Fight of the Night: Krzysztof Soszynski vs. Stephan Bonnar and Yoshihiro Akiyama vs. Chris Leben
- Knockout of the Night: Gerald Harris
- Submission of the Night: Brock Lesnar

== Reported payout ==
The following is the reported payout to the fighters as reported to the Nevada State Athletic Commission. It does not include sponsor money or "locker room" bonuses often given by the UFC and also do not include the UFC's traditional "fight night" bonuses.

- Brock Lesnar $400,000 (no win bonus) def. Shane Carwin ($40,000)
- Chris Leben $86,000 ($43,000 win bonus) def. Yoshihiro Akiyama ($45,000)
- Chris Lytle $52,000 ($26,000 win bonus) def. Matt Brown ($10,000)
- Stephan Bonnar $50,000 ($25,000 win bonus) def. Krzysztof Soszynski ($10,000)
- George Sotiropoulos $24,000 ($12,000 win bonus) def. Kurt Pellegrino ($25,000)
- Brendan Schaub $20,000 ($10,000 win bonus) def. Chris Tuchscherer ($12,000)
- Ricardo Romero $16,000 ($8,000 win bonus) def. Seth Petruzelli ($10,000)
- Kendall Grove $50,000 ($25,000 win bonus) def. Goran Reljic ($5,000)
- Gerald Harris $20,000 ($10,000 win bonus) def. Dave Branch($6,000)
- Daniel Roberts $12,000 ($6,000 win bonus) def. Forrest Petz ($6,000)
- Jon Madsen $16,000 ($8,000 win bonus) def. Karlos Vemola ($8,000)

== See also ==
- Ultimate Fighting Championship
- List of UFC champions
- List of UFC events
- 2010 in UFC
