= Nemesis Fighting: MMA Global Invasion =

2010 mixed martial arts event

- Promotion: Nemesis Fighting
- Date: December 10, 2010
- City: (Dominican Republic) Punta Cana, La Altagracia

Nemesis Fighting: MMA Global Invasion was a mixed martial arts event promoted by Nemesis Fighting. It was originally scheduled to take place on November 13, 2010 in Punta Cana, La Altagracia.

== Controversy ==
The event was postponed to avoid a storm the new date for the event being December 10, 2010. The company also promised a "live" internet stream of the fights on December 13, 2010 but that did not happen.

The event has been marred by accusations that fighters were not compensated.

Keith Jardine has been accused of greasing in the fight, they had no judges and the time for the rounds were kept by a mobile phone. John Dodson claimed his fight with John Moraga lasted 17 or 18 minutes. “It was unorganized," said Dodson. "They didn’t have anything well put together.”

The promotion reportedly owed at least $233,000 which was never paid. The case has been taken up by the U.S. Secret Service.

Nemesis Fight Promotions has not hosted an event since and their website has been suspended.

== Results ==
Main card
Weight class				Method	Round	Time	Notes
Light heavyweight	Keith Jardine	def	Francisco France	Unanimous decision	3	5:00
Light heavyweight	Mike Nickels	def	Kyle Seals	Submission (armbar)	1	N/A
Flyweight	John Dodson	def	John Moraga	Unanimous decision	3	5:00
Welterweight	Terry Martin	def	Josh Martin	TKO (punches)	1	1:27
Middleweight	Chaun Sims	def	Oscar Sosa	Submission (armbar)	3	N/A
Light heavyweight	Eliot Marshall	def	Chris McNally	Submission (armbar)	1	N/A
Lightweight	Isaac Vallie-Flagg	def	Alejandro Villalobos	KO (punches)	3	N/A
Heavyweight	Paul Buentello	def	Kerry Schall	Unanimous decision	3	5:00
Lightweight	Jose Tezanos	def	Travis Marx	Unanimous decision	3	5:00
