= Travis Marx =

American mixed martial arts fighter (born 1977)

- Born: October 25, 1977 (age 48); Roosevelt, Utah, United States
- Other names: T-Train
- Height: 5 ft 6 in (1.68 m)
- Weight: 135 lb (61 kg; 9.6 st)
- Division: Bantamweight (135 lb); Featherweight (145 lb); Lightweight (155 lb)
- Reach: 65.0 in (165 cm)
- Fighting out of: Albuquerque, New Mexico, United States
- Team: Jackson's Mixed Martial Arts; Elite Performance (formerly)
- Years active: 2003, 2007–present

Mixed martial arts record
- Total: 27
- Wins: 21
- By knockout: 5
- By submission: 10
- By decision: 6
- Losses: 5
- By knockout: 1
- By submission: 1
- By decision: 3
- Draws: 0
- No contests: 1

Other information
- Occupation: UHP member (formerly)
- University: Ricks College (BYU)
- Notable school: Union High School (Utah)
- Mixed martial arts record from Sherdog

Travis Marx (born October 25, 1977) is an American mixed martial artist who formerly competed in Bellator's bantamweight division.

== Background ==
Marx was born and raised in Roosevelt, Utah. He was a three-time state wrestling champion at Union High School and placed third in NJCAA at Ricks College (later renamed Brigham Young University-Idaho). He worked toward his degrees in Sociology and Spanish, making a two-year mission trip to Patagonia for the LDS Church.

Marx is also a former Utah Highway Patrol member and currently lives in New Mexico.

== Mixed martial arts career ==
=== Early career: Ultimate Combat Experience ===
Marx started his career in 2003. He fought mainly for Utah's promotion Ultimate Combat Experience. Within five years — with an idle period in MMA between July 2003 and March 2007 — he compiled a record of nine victories and no losses.

=== Jeremy Horn's Elite Fight Night and Throwdown Showdown ===
Marx had his first career's defeat against fellow prospect Steven Siler. Beyond that, he obtained six more victories between 2008 and 2009, including a victory over Rad Martinez and a no contest against Nick Mamalis.

=== Nemesis Fighting, Jackson's MMA and Clash in the Cage ===
Marx fought in the controversial event Nemesis Fighting: MMA Global Invasion against Jose Tezanos, in which he lost via unanimous decision. The promotion was later accused of not paying some fighters and the case was taken up by the U.S. Secret Service.

Marx faced Gracie Arizona's Ray Robinson in June 2011 at Jackson's MMA Series 5. He won via submission early in the first round.

Marx faced Mikey Lovato in September 2011 at Clash in the Cage. He defeated Lovato via submission due to strikes in the first round.

With three victories in a row in 2011, Marx signed with Bellator to compete in the bantamweight tournament.

=== Bellator MMA ===
Marx made his debut on April 6, 2012, at Bellator 64 in the quarterfinal match of Bellator season six bantamweight tournament against former Shooto featherweight champion Masakatsu Ueda. Marx won via unanimous decision (29-28, 29–28, 29–28) and advanced to the semifinals.

In the semifinals on May 11, 2012, at Bellator 68, Marx faced Marcos Galvão. He lost via unanimous decision (29-28, 29–28, 29–28).

Marx faced former WEC bantamweight champion Chase Beebe on February 21, 2013, at Bellator 90. He defeated Beebe via unanimous decision (30-27, 30–27, 30–27).

Marx faced Brandon Bender in the semifinal match of Bellator season nine bantamweight tournament on September 20, 2013, at Bellator 100. He managed to come through a hard first round defending an anaconda choke and won via TKO in the second round.

Marx faced Joe Warren in the finals on November 8, 2013, at Bellator 107. He lost the fight via TKO in the second round.

Marx was released from Bellator following his loss to Warren, leaving with a 3–2 record within the promotion.

== Championships and accomplishments ==
- Bellator Fighting Championships
  - Bellator Season 9 Bantamweight Tournament Runner-Up

== Mixed martial arts record ==
Professional record breakdown
27 matches	21 wins	5 losses
By knockout	5	1
By submission	10	1
By decision	6	3
Draws	0	
No contests	1	

Res.	Record	Opponent	Method	Event	Date	Round	Time	Location	Notes
Loss	21–5 (1)	Joe Warren	TKO (punches)	Bellator 107	November 8, 2013	2	1:54	Thackerville, Oklahoma, United States	Bellator season 9 bantamweight tournament final.
Win	21–4 (1)	Brandon Bender	TKO (knee to the body and punches)	Bellator 100	September 20, 2013	2	4:28	Phoenix, Arizona, United States	Bellator season 9 bantamweight tournament semifinal.
Win	20–4 (1)	Chase Beebe	Decision (unanimous)	Bellator 90	February 21, 2013	3	5:00	West Valley City, Utah, United States	137 lb catchweight bout.
Loss	19–4 (1)	Marcos Galvão	Decision (unanimous)	Bellator 68	May 11, 2012	3	5:00	Atlantic City, New Jersey, United States	Bellator season 6 bantamweight tournament semifinal.
Win	19–3 (1)	Masakatsu Ueda	Decision (unanimous)	Bellator 64	April 6, 2012	3	5:00	Windsor, Ontario, Canada	Bellator season 6 bantamweight tournament quarterfinal.
Win	18–3 (1)	Mikey Lovato	Submission (punches)	Fresquez Productions - Clash in the Cage	September 9, 2011	1	1:38	Albuquerque, New Mexico, United States	
Win	17–3 (1)	Ray Robinson	Submission (choke)	JMMAS - Jackson's MMA Series 5	June 9, 2011	1	0:56	Albuquerque, New Mexico, United States	
Win	16–3 (1)	Trevor Mellen	Decision (split)	Showdown Fights 3 - New Blood	January 28, 2011	3	5:00	Orem, Utah, United States	
Loss	15–3 (1)	Jose Tezanos	Decision (unanimous)	Nemesis Fighting: MMA Global Invasion	December 11, 2010	3	5:00	Punta Cana, Dominican Republic	
Loss	15–2 (1)	Richie Whitson	Decision (unanimous)	Prestige - MMA 1	September 20, 2010	3	5:00	Fort McMurray, Alberta, Canada	
Win	15–1 (1)	Jeff Willingham	Submission (rear-naked choke)	JHEFN - Jeremy Horn's Elite Fight Night 10	August 14, 2009	2	1:32	Layton, Utah, United States	
Win	14–1 (1)	Angelo Duarte	Submission (rear-naked choke)	JHEFN - Jeremy Horn's Elite Fight Night 9	June 26, 2009	1	4:30	Layton, Utah, United States	
Win	13–1 (1)	Nick Buschman	TKO (doctor stoppage)	JHEFN - Jeremy Horn's Elite Fight Night 7	March 27, 2009	2	5:00	Layton, Utah, United States	
Win	12–1 (1)	Jesse Brock	Decision (unanimous)	Throwdown Showdown 3 - Big Time	February 20, 2009	3	5:00	Salt Lake City, Utah, United States	
Win	11–1 (1)	Scott Grimm	Submission	JHEFN - Jeremy Horn's Elite Fight Night 5	November 14, 2008	1	1:01	Layton, Utah, United States	
Loss	10–1 (1)	Steven Siler	Submission (triangle choke)	JHEFN - Jeremy Horn's Elite Fight Night 2	May 17, 2008	2	3:35	Salt Lake City, Utah, United States	
Win	10–0 (1)	Rad Martinez	Decision (unanimous)	Throwdown Showdown 1 - Showdown	April 18, 2008	3	5:00	Orem, Utah, United States	
NC	9–0 (1)	Nick Mamalis	No contest	JHEFN - Jeremy Horn's Elite Fight Night 1	April 5, 2008	2	3:33	Salt Lake City, Utah, United States	
Win	9–0	Dan Berry	TKO (punches)	UCE - Round 28 - Worlds Collide	December 1, 2007	1	0:46	Salt Lake City, Utah, United States	
Win	8–0	Serge Rochon	Submission (rear-naked choke)	GFS - Colosseum 6	October 26, 2007	1	N/A	Winnipeg, Manitoba, Canada	
Win	7–0	Tim Moon	TKO (corner stoppage)	UCE - Round 27 - Finals	September 22, 2007	2	5:00	Salt Lake City, Utah, United States	
Win	6–0	Walter Buse	Decision (split)	UCE - Round 25 - Finals	March 17, 2007	3	3:00	West Valley City, Utah, United States	
Win	5–0	Dan Berry	Submission (rear-naked choke)	UCE - Round 25 - Episode 9 "Day 2"	March 3, 2007	1	1:13	Salt Lake City, Utah, United States	
Win	4–0	Josh Buck	Submission	Utah County - Main Event FC	July 19, 2003	1	N/A	Orem, Utah, United States	
Win	3–0	Robert Densley	TKO	UCE - Round 4 - Finals	July 12, 2003	2	N/A	Salt Lake City, Utah, United States	
Win	2–0	Matt Raines	Submission	UCE - Round 4 - Semi-Finals	July 5, 2003	3	N/A	Salt Lake City, Utah, United States	
Win	1–0	Craig Perez	Submission	UCE - Round 4 - Episode 3	June 21, 2003	1	N/A	Salt Lake City, Utah, United States	
