= Carlos Eduardo Rocha =

Brazilian mixed martial artist

- Born: Carlos Eduardo Kuhrau; July 12, 1984 (age 42); Cabedelo, Paraíba, Brazil
- Height: 5 ft 10 in (1.78 m)
- Weight: 170 lb (77 kg; 12 st)
- Division: Welterweight
- Reach: 73 in (190 cm)
- Stance: Orthodox
- Fighting out of: Hamburg, Germany
- Team: Darcio Lira Jiu-Jitsu
- Rank: 3rd degree black belt in Brazilian Jiu-Jitsu
- Years active: 1997-present

Mixed martial arts record
- Total: 13
- Wins: 9
- By knockout: 1
- By submission: 8
- Losses: 4
- By knockout: 2
- By decision: 2

Other information
- Mixed martial arts record from Sherdog
- Last updated on: January 18, 2019

Carlos Eduardo Rocha (born July 12, 1984), also known as Carlos Eduardo Rocha, is a Brazilian mixed martial artist.

== Early life ==
Born an orphan in Cabedelo, Brazil he worked as a dish washer, often sleeping outside, on the street, and on beaches. He started training in martial arts at the age of six and eventually he saved enough money to move to Fortaleza, Ceará, Brazil.

In Fortaleza, he was taken in by Dárcio Lira, from whom he learned Brazilian jiu-jitsu and earned his black belt. He claims to have won around 50 regional tournaments in Brazil and Germany between 1996 and 2008 before turning to professional mixed martial arts. Before turning pro, he worked as a Jiu-Jitsu instructor and bouncer.

He got his nickname "Tá Danado" (or "The Spaz") because of the herky-jerky way he moved around on the mat when working his jiu-jitsu. His coach would tell him 'Hey kid, stop being so agitated (danado), stay calm.' when he grappled. The term is meant to liken him to the cartoon character Taz.

== Mixed martial arts career ==
In 2008 he traveled to Dresden as a cornerman of German MMA pioneer Andre Balschmieter for an 8-man tournament. When Balschmieter had to pull out due to injury Rocha elected to take his place. Because of numerous injuries, the tournament was dropped to four fighters, and after a quick submission victory over Johannes Kunz, Rocha found himself competing for the Free Fight Alliance (FFA) middleweight title in only his second professional fight. Rocha won the fight by submission, over the far more experienced Steve Mensing, to become FFA Middleweight Champion and was quickly pegged as a rising star in the German MMA circuit. He went on to gain La Onda's Manto Cup in an 8-man, one-night tournament in 2009 and was signed by the UFC soon afterward.

=== Ultimate Fighting Championship ===
Rocha made his official UFC debut November 13, 2010, at UFC 122: Marquardt vs. Okami. To motivate him, Rocha's manager told him he only had a one-fight contract, and he would need to win to stay in the UFC. He fought TUF 11 runner-up Kris McCray defeating him by kneebar at 2:21 of round 1.

Rocha's next fight came only two months later, on February 5, 2011, at UFC 126: Silva vs. Belfort against Jake Ellenberger. Rocha was a replacement for Jon Fitch after Fitch was moved to the UFC 127 main event to fight B.J. Penn. Rocha lost the fight via controversial split decision. The dissenting judge scoring the bout for Rocha drew the ire of commentator Joe Rogan and other members of the press, who cited the 30-27 scoring as "questionable".

After his fight with Ellenberger, Rocha hoped to compete at UFC 134 in Rio pending the results of shoulder and elbow surgery. However, further X-rays showed severe damage in both his right and left elbows, leaving him unable to compete for the rest of 2011. He had hoped to return some time in early 2012, but was unable to schedule a fight. After recovering from surgery he moved to the US and started training with team Black House in Los Angeles, California.

Rocha next faced Mike Pierce on June 8, 2012, at UFC on FX 3. As well as moving to Black House to train for the fight, Rocha claimed that this was the first time in his career that he had a full training camp leading up to a fight. Originally 2 judges scored the fight 30-27 for Pierce, while the 3rd judge inexplicably scored it 30-27 for Rocha. However, it was later announced that the judge, Ric Bays, had scored the fight for the wrong corner and that Pierce had actually won unanimously.

Rocha was released from his UFC contract following his loss to Pierce. After his release Rocha was publicly critical of Pierce for his lack of aggression in the fight, and perceived unwillingness to engage with Rocha. He was also critical of the UFC for releasing him, saying "I had good performances and even so I was cut off. I didn’t expect this.”

== Championships and achievements ==
=== Grappling ===
- CBJJO Copa Del Mundo
  - −77 kg Blue Belt: 1st Place
  - −77 kg Purple Belt: 1st Place & Purple Belt Absolute: 1st Place
- Submissao
  - 2009 Submission Wrestling Finalist

=== Mixed Martial Arts ===
- Free Fight Alliance
  - FFA European Middleweight Champion (1 time)
- La Onda
  - Manto Cup Champion Winner

== Mixed martial arts record ==
Professional record breakdown
13 matches	9 wins	4 losses
By knockout	1	2
By submission	8	0
By decision	0	2

Res.	Record	Opponent	Method	Event	Date	Round	Time	Location	Notes
Loss	9–4	James Terry	TKO (punches)	Bellator 142: Dynamite 1	September 19, 2015	1	4:00	San Jose, California United States	
Loss	9–3	Florent Betorangal	TKO (punches)	GMC 4: Next Level	July 6, 2013	3	1:28	Gysenberghalle, Herne, Germany	
Loss	9–2	Mike Pierce	Decision (unanimous)	UFC on FX: Johnson vs. McCall	June 8, 2012	3	5:00	Sunrise, Florida, United States	
Loss	9–1	Jake Ellenberger	Decision (split)	UFC 126	February 5, 2011	3	5:00	Las Vegas, Nevada, United States	
Win	9–0	Kris McCray	Submission (kneebar)	UFC 122	November 13, 2010	1	2:21	Oberhausen, Germany	
Win	8–0	Fatih Balci	Submission (arm-triangle choke)	GMC 1: The Beginning	May 29, 2010	1	3:58	Herne, Germany	
Win	7–0	Artur Kadlubek	TKO (corner stoppage)	La Onda: Manto Cup	November 1, 2009	1	5:00	Magdeburg, Germany	Won Manto Cup
Win	6–0	Mihajlo Mihnjak	Submission (arm-triangle choke)	La Onda: Manto Cup	November 1, 2009	1	1:04	Magdeburg, Germany	
Win	5–0	David Goldberg	Submission (armbar)	La Onda: Manto Cup	November 1, 2009	1	1:57	Magdeburg, Germany	
Win	4–0	Yasin Mengulluoglu	Submission (heel hook)	8ME: Night of Bang 5	December 6, 2008	2	2:35	Halle, Germany	
Win	3–0	Jimmy Sidoni	Submission (armbar)	La Onda: It's Showtime	October 19, 2008	1	1:40	Magdeburg, Germany	
Win	2–0	Steve Mensing	Submission (leglock)	FFA: East German Championships 2008	July 12, 2008	1	1:20	Erfurt, Germany	Won FFA European middleweight title
Win	1–0	Johannes Kunze	Submission (rear-naked choke)	FFA: European Championships	May 17, 2008	1	2:18	Dresden, Germany	

== Submission grappling record ==
0 Wins (0 Submissions), 1 Losses (1 Submissions), 0 Draws
Result	Rec.	Opponent	Method	Event	Division	Date	Location
Loss	0–1	(United States) Benji Silva	Submission (kneebar)	Fight 2 Win 98	Superfight	January 19, 2019	(United States) San Jose, California
