= David Bielkheden =

Swedish mixed martial arts fighter

- Born: June 6, 1979 (age 47); Stockholm, Sweden
- Other names: Buster
- Nationality: Swedish
- Height: 5 ft 10 in (1.78 m)
- Weight: 170 lb (77 kg; 12 st)
- Division: Lightweight; Welterweight
- Team: Allstars Training Center; Brazilian Top Team; Hilti NHB; Scandinavian BJJ Academy
- Rank: Third degree Black belt in Brazilian Jiu-Jitsu
- Years active: 2001-present

Mixed martial arts record
- Total: 39
- Wins: 26
- By knockout: 10
- By submission: 6
- By decision: 10
- Losses: 13
- By knockout: 1
- By submission: 2
- By decision: 9
- By disqualification: 1

Other information
- Mixed martial arts record from Sherdog

David Bielkheden (born June 6, 1979) is a retired Swedish mixed martial artist who competed in the Welterweight division. A professional competitor since 2001, he has competed for the UFC, PRIDE Fighting Championships, Shooto, Cage Rage, M-1 Global, and Cage Warriors.

== Mixed martial arts career ==
Bielkheden went 1–2 in UFC and was released from the UFC following his submission loss (rear-naked choke) to Mark Bocek at UFC 97 and has since held a record of 13–5. Right now is Bielkheden riding a 9 fight win streak.

=== Superior Challenge ===
On October 29, 2010, Bielkheden fought Daniel Acácio for the Superior Challenge Welterweight Championship at Superior Challenge 6. He lost the fight via split decision. Bielkheden later failed his post fight drug test following the defeat and was given a 2-year suspension by the Doping Tribunal on April 29, 2011. Additionally, Bielkheden's loss was changed to a disqualification. Bielkheden initially tested positive for methylhexaneamine, a stimulant often used as a nasal decongestant. The fighter found out about his positive test by mail when he returned from a trip from Canada shortly after the bout. He then paid out of pocket to have his “B” sample tested in hopes that a different result would be found. That was not the case, as Bielkheden found out in December 2010 that his second screen was also flagged for the banned substance, which was added to the World Anti-Doping Agency's prohibited list in 2009. Bielkheden called it a case of “accidental doping” and has pointed to a nasal spray he took a few weeks prior to the bout or food supplements as the probable cause of this substance showing up in tests. In a statement to his fans on his blog, Bielkheden asserts that he had cooperated with the Swedish Doping Tribunal and had been given the go-ahead to fight at Superior Challenge 7 on three separate occasions. Bielkheden was reportedly told the tribunal would hand down judgment for his positive test during the first week of May. However, his punishment was delivered a bit sooner than expected. "The punishment I have been awarded is far too long,” he wrote. “I will spend all my energy, time and money to contest this decision and get this sentence shortened.”

== Championships and accomplishments ==
=== Mixed martial arts ===
- Superior Challenge
  - SC Welterweight Championship (One time)
    - Two successful title defenses
- Scandinavian Fight Nights
  - SFN Welterweight Championship (One time; first; current)
- Shooto Sweden
  - Shooto Sweden Welterweight Championship (One time)

=== Submission grappling ===
- 1999 European cup 3rd place
- 1999 France Open debutant winner
- 1999 France Open advanced 2nd place
- 1999 Krugan Cup 2nd place
- 2000 Iron Man UK winner
- 2000 Finnish Open 3rd place
- 2001 Kaisho Cup 2 winner
- 2001 BadBoy Cup winner
- 2001 Grapplers Paradise winner
- 2001 Kaisho Cup 4 3rd place
- 2002 Fighter Extreme 1 winner
- 2002 Finnish Open winner
- 2002 Finnish Open BJJ winner
- 2003 ADCC European Trials 3rd place
- 2003 Pan American purplebelt class winner
- 2003 Exhale BJJ purplebelt open class winner
- 2003 Finnish Open winner
- 2004 Gameness 2nd place
- 2004 Submission Wrestling Superfight Winner
- 2004 ADCC Dutch Open Winner
- 2007 SFG Submission Wrestling Tournament winner
- 2010 Swedish National Submission Wrestling Championship
- 2012 Swedish National Submission Wrestling Championship

== Mixed martial arts record ==
Professional record breakdown
39 matches	26 wins	13 losses
By knockout	10	1
By submission	6	2
By decision	10	9
By disqualification	0	1

Res.	Record	Opponent	Method	Event	Date	Round	Time	Location	Notes
Loss	26–13	Patrik Pietilä	Decision (unanimous)	Superior Challenge 19	May 11, 2019	3	5:00	Stockholm, Sweden	Non-title bout.
Win	26–12	Marcin Bandel	Decision (unanimous)	Superior Challenge 18	December 1, 2018	3	5:00	Stockholm, Sweden	Defended SC Welterweight Championship.
Win	25–12	Anton Radman	TKO (punches)	Superior Challenge 16	December 2, 2017	1	4:20	Stockholm, Sweden	Defended SC Welterweight Championship.
Win	24–12	Morten Djursaa	Decision (unanimous)	Superior Challenge 15	April 1, 2017	3	5:00	Stockholm, Sweden	Won SC Welterweight Championship.
Win	23–12	Luis Ramos	TKO (punches)	Superior Challenge 14	October 8, 2016	3	2:13	Stockholm, Sweden	
Win	22–12	Adrian Grec	TKO (punches)	Scandinavian Fight Nights 1	June 4, 2016	1	N/A	Solna, Sweden	Won SFN Welterweight Championship.
Win	21–12	Cody McKenzie	Decision (unanimous)	Superior Challenge 12	May 16, 2015	3	5:00	Malmö, Sweden	
Win	20–12	Florent Betorangal	Submission (kneebar)	Superior Challenge 11	November 29, 2014	2	4:59	Södertälje, Sweden	
Win	19–12	Besam Yousef	Decision (unanimous)	Superior Challenge 10	May 3, 2014	3	5:00	Helsingborg, Sweden	
Win	18–12	Diego Gonzalez	Decision (unanimous)	Golden Ring: Wallberg vs Prazak	June 14, 2013	3	5:00	Stockholm, Sweden	
Loss	17–12	Marcus Davis	Decision (unanimous)	Superior Challenge 8	October 6, 2012	3	5:00	Malmö, Sweden	
Loss	17–11	Cathal Pendred	Decision (unanimous)	Cage Warriors: 47	June 2, 2012	3	5:00	Dublin, Ireland	
Win	17–10	Edgar Dayan	TKO (punches)	MMA Against Dengue 2	March 4, 2012	1	1:19	Rio de Janeiro, Brazil	
Loss	16–10	Flavio Alvaro	Decision (split)	MMA Against Dengue	November 27, 2011	3	5:00	Rio de Janeiro, Brazil	
Loss	16–9	Daniel Acácio	DQ (overturned)	Superior Challenge 6	October 29, 2010	3	5:00	Stockholm, Sweden	For SC Welterweight Championship; Originally split decision loss, overturned since Bielkheden tested positive for banned substances.
Loss	16–8	Tommy Depret	Submission (guillotine choke)	United Glory 12	October 16, 2010	1	0:36	Amsterdam, Netherlands	Return to Welterweight; UG Welterweight Tournament Quarterfinal bout.
Win	16–7	Musa Khamanaev	TKO (punches)	M-1 Selection 2010: Western Europe Round 3	May 29, 2010	2	1:57	Helsinki, Finland	
Win	15–7	Ville Räsänen	TKO (punches)	Helsinki Fight Night	November 28, 2009	1	3:06	Helsinki, Finland	
Win	14–7	Ufuk Isgusarer	Decision (unanimous)	Upcoming Glory 5	June 27, 2009	5	5:00	Deventer, Netherlands	
Loss	13–7	Mark Bocek	Submission (rear-naked choke)	UFC 97	April 18, 2009	1	4:57	Montreal, Quebec, Canada	
Win	13–6	Jess Liaudin	Decision (unanimous)	UFC 89	October 18, 2008	3	5:00	Birmingham, England	Lightweight debut.
Loss	12–6	Diego Sanchez	TKO (submission to punches)	UFC 82	March 1, 2008	1	4:43	Columbus, Ohio, United States	
Win	12–5	Nikola Matic	TKO	Lord of the Ring: Schilt vs. Guelmino	January 12, 2008	1	N/A	Belgrade, Serbia	
Win	11–5	Lubormir Roumenov	Decision (unanimous)	FinnFight 9	December 15, 2007	2	N/A	Turku, Finland	
Loss	10–5	Mitsuhiro Ishida	Decision (unanimous)	PRIDE: Bushido 13	November 5, 2006	2	5:00	Yokohama, Kanagawa, Japan	Lightweight (160 lb) bout.
Loss	10–4	Phil Norman	Decision (unanimous)	Cage Rage 17	July 1, 2006	3	5:00	London, England	
Win	10–3	Steve Dawson	KO (punches)	CWFC: Strike Force 5	March 25, 2006	1	0:50	Coventry, England	
Win	9–3	Josenildo Ramarho	Submission (rear-naked choke)	CWFC: Strike Force 3	October 1, 2005	1	4:52	Coventry, England	
Loss	8–3	Shiko Yamashita	Decision (majority)	Shooto: 4/23 in Hakata Star Lanes	April 23, 2005	3	5:00	Hakata, Fukuoka, Japan	
Win	8–2	Patrick Vallee	Submission (armbar)	Shooto Sweden: Second Impact	March 12, 2005	1	3:30	Stockholm, Sweden	Won Shooto Sweden Welterweight Championship
Win	7–2	Tom Haddock	KO	Fight Night 2	October 30, 2004	1	1:42	Belfast, Northern Ireland	
Win	6–2	Valdas Pocevicius	Decision	Shooto Sweden: Initial Collision	September 3, 2004	3	5:00	Stockholm, Sweden	
Loss	5–2	Ryuta Sakurai	Decision (unanimous)	Shooto: 7/16 in Korakuen Hall	July 16, 2004	3	5:00	Tokyo, Japan	
Win	5–1	Sigitas Antanavicius	TKO (punches)	Shooto Finland: Capital Punishment 2	April 5, 2004	1	1:57	Helsinki, Finland	
Win	4–1	Charles McCarthy	TKO (submission to punches)	Absolute Fighting Championships 7	February 27, 2004	1	3:33	Ft. Lauderdale, Florida, United States	
Win	3–1	Kimmo Nurkse	Submission (choke)	FinnFight 7	November 1, 2003	1	1:58	Turku, Finland	
Win	2–1	Joni Kyllonen	Decision (unanimous)	Shooto Finland: Capital Punishment	September 15, 2003	2	5:00	Helsinki, Finland	Welterweight debut.
Win	1–1	Kai Rintakorpi	TKO (submission to punches)	Shooto Finland: Cold War	February 22, 2003	1	2:34	Turku, Finland	
Loss	0–1	Arben Latifi	Decision	FinnFight 5	November 24, 2001	2	5:00	Turku, Finland	
