= Ricardo Romero (fighter) =

American mixed martial arts fighter

- Born: April 15, 1978 (age 48); North Brunswick, New Jersey, United States
- Nationality: American
- Height: 6 ft 0 in (1.83 m)
- Weight: 205 lb (93 kg; 14.6 st)
- Division: Light Heavyweight; Heavyweight
- Reach: 76 in (190 cm)
- Fighting out of: North Brunswick, New Jersey, United States
- Team: Advanced Martial Arts; AMA Fight Club
- Years active: 2007–2011

Mixed martial arts record
- Total: 14
- Wins: 11
- By knockout: 4
- By submission: 6
- By decision: 1
- Losses: 3
- By knockout: 3

Other information
- Mixed martial arts record from Sherdog

Ricardo Romero (born April 15, 1978) is an American professional mixed martial arts fighter. He was a featured competitor on multiple occasions for the Ring of Combat promotion which featured on HDNet Fights and also competed for their Light Heavyweight title. Romero was also a competitor in the Ultimate Fighting Championship.

A native of South Brunswick, New Jersey, Romero wrestled while at South Brunswick High School.

== Mixed martial arts career ==
=== Early career ===
After going 5–0 in the promotion, Romero fought Glen Sandull for the vacant Ring of Combat Light Heavyweight championship. Midway through the second round, Romero caught Sandull with an illegal soccer kick and was disqualified, handing him his first ever professional loss, whilst also gifting Sandull the title.

Five months later, Romero returned against Brendan Barrett in a fight to declare the number one contender to the belt Romero missed out on. Romero won via submission (rear naked choke) after 0:44 of the second round.

Romero next faced future Ultimate Fighter and UFC competitor James McSweeney which once again aired on HDNet Fights. Romero won his second successive submission victory via rear naked choke.

This was followed by a victory over The Ultimate Fighter 8 competitor Karen Grigoryan and Romero once again won, this via TKO (punches) in the second round. This win earned him the Light Heavyweight title.

Romero fought twice more for the Ring of Combat, defending his ROC Light Heavyweight title, winning both by submission (one by kimura, one by keylock).

Bloodyelbow also declared him a "rising star" in their list of desired fighters for the UFC Light Heavyweight division.

=== Ultimate Fighting Championship ===
Romero joined the UFC in June 2010 and was set to face former World Extreme Cagefighting Light Heavyweight champion Steve Cantwell at UFC 116. However, despite receiving medical clearance, Cantwell had to withdraw and the bout was cancelled. Romero instead faced Seth Petruzelli at UFC 116 on the live prelim show on Spike TV. In the second round, Romero caught Petruzelli in an armbar that injured his arm forcing him to tap, giving Romero the win.

Romero faced Kyle Kingsbury on February 5, 2011 at UFC 126. He lost the fight via TKO due to strikes just 21 seconds into the first round.

Romero faced James Te-Huna on September 24, 2011 at UFC 135. He lost the fight via KO only forty-seven seconds into the first round.

After the loss, Romero was released from the promotion.

=== Bellator ===
Romero was then scheduled to make his Bellator debut against Tim Carpenter at Bellator 65. However the fight was cancelled prior to the event for unknown reasons.

== Personal life ==
Romero has two sons, Jackson and Beau. He currently resides with his wife, Sarah Reinbold, and their family in South New Jersey.

== Championships and accomplishments ==
=== Mixed martial arts ===
- Ring of Combat
  - Ring of Combat Heavyweight Championship (One time)
  - Ring of Combat Light Heavyweight Championship (One time)
  - One successful title defense

== Mixed martial arts record ==
Professional record breakdown
14 matches	11 wins	3 losses
By knockout	4	2
By submission	6	0
By decision	1	0
By disqualification	0	1

Res.	Record	Opponent	Method	Event	Date	Round	Time	Location	Notes
Loss	11–3	James Te Huna	KO (punches)	UFC 135	September 24, 2011	1	0:47	Denver, Colorado, United States	
Loss	11–2	Kyle Kingsbury	TKO (knees to the body and punches)	UFC 126	February 5, 2011	1	0:21	Las Vegas, Nevada, United States	
Win	11–1	Seth Petruzelli	Submission (straight armbar)	UFC 116	July 3, 2010	2	3:05	Las Vegas, Nevada, United States	
Win	10–1	Silmar Rodrigo	Submission (americana)	Ring of Combat 27	November 20, 2009	1	4:56	Atlantic City, New Jersey, United States	
Win	9–1	Rich Lictawa	Submission (kimura)	Ring of Combat 26	September 11, 2009	2	2:14	Atlantic City, New Jersey, United States	Defended the ROC Light Heavyweight Championship.
Win	8–1	Karen Grigoryan	TKO (punches)	Ring of Combat 25	June 12, 2009	2	2:50	Atlantic City, New Jersey, United States	Won the ROC Light Heavyweight Championship.
Win	7–1	James McSweeney	Submission (rear-naked choke)	Ring of Combat 24	April 17, 2009	1	2:27	Atlantic City, New Jersey, United States	
Win	6–1	Brendan Barrett	Submission (rear-naked choke)	Ring of Combat 23	February 20, 2009	2	0:44	Atlantic City, New Jersey, United States	
Loss	5–1	Glen Sandull	DQ (illegal knee)	Ring of Combat 21	September 12, 2008	2	2:50	Atlantic City, New Jersey, United States	For the vacant ROC Light Heavyweight Championship.
Win	5–0	Costas Philippou	Decision (split)	Ring of Combat 19	May 9, 2008	3	5:00	Atlantic City, New Jersey, United States	
Win	4–0	Randy Durant	TKO (punches)	Ring of Combat 18	March 7, 2008	1	1:13	Atlantic City, New Jersey, United States	
Win	3–0	John Doyle	TKO (punches)	ROC 17: Beast of the Northeast Finals	November 30, 2007	1	3:19	Atlantic City, New Jersey, United States	Won the ROC Heavyweight Championship.
Win	2–0	John Clarke	TKO (corner stoppage)	ROC 16: Beast of the Northeast Semi-Finals	October 26, 2007	1	4:00	Atlantic City, New Jersey, United States	
Win	1–0	Bryce Harrell	TKO (submission to punches)	ROC 15: Beast of the Northeast Quarterfinals	September 7, 2007	1	2:09	Atlantic City, New Jersey, United States	
