= Chase Beebe =

American mixed martial arts (MMA) fighter

- Born: March 29, 1985 (age 41); Chicago, Illinois, United States
- Other names: The Rage
- Height: 5 ft 7 in (1.70 m)
- Weight: 135 lb (61 kg; 9.6 st)
- Division: Bantamweight; Featherweight
- Reach: 67.0 in (170 cm)
- Fighting out of: Chicago, Illinois, United States
- Team: Gilbert Grappling
- Years active: 2006–2014

Mixed martial arts record
- Total: 38
- Wins: 24
- By knockout: 1
- By submission: 17
- By decision: 6
- Losses: 13
- By knockout: 3
- By submission: 3
- By decision: 7
- Draws: 1

Other information
- Notable relatives: Carson Beebe, brother Conor Beebe, brother
- Mixed martial arts record from Sherdog

Chase Beebe (born March 29, 1985) is a retired American professional mixed martial artist from Chicago, Illinois. He most recently fought for the World Extreme Cagefighting organization, where he was the Bantamweight Champion. He lost that belt on February 13, 2008, to fellow Midwestern MMA fighter Miguel Torres. Beebe trains at Gilbert Grappling in Country Club Hills, IL.

== Background ==
Prior to MMA, Chase was a successful wrestler. He was a four-time Illinois State Champion for Montini Catholic in Lombard, Illinois. Collegiately, he wrestled for the Purdue Boilermakers and the Eastern Illinois Panthers.

== MMA career ==
=== World Extreme Cagefighting ===
Beebe made his WEC debut on March 24, 2007, at WEC 26: Condit vs. Alessio against Eddie Wineland for the WEC Bantamweight Championship, Beebe won via unanimous decision. On September 5, 2007, Beebe defended the WEC Bantamweight Championship against Rani Yahya at WEC 30 winning via unanimous decision.

Beebe was defeated by fellow Chicago native Miguel Torres losing the WEC Bantamweight Championship at WEC 32 via guillotine choke submission in round one. On June 1, 2008, Beebe was defeated by Will Ribeiro via split decision, following back to back loses Beebe was released by the WEC.

=== Ultimate Warrior Challenge ===
Chase was scheduled to fight Mike Easton for the UWC Bantamweight title on February 21, 2009. However, he failed to show up at the official weigh-in the day before and was scratched from the card. Beebe allegedly sustained a knee injury that hampered his training and ability to reduce his weight to the contractually-set limit of 135 pounds. Chase was replaced by Justin Robbins.

Chase got another shot at Mike Easton for the UWC 135 pound title. The bout took place on October 3, 2009, in Fairfax, Virginia. The fight was a grueling 5 rounder where Chase spent most of the fight on Easton's back trying to sink in a rear naked choke. Most people, including the commentators, scored the fight 49-46 in favor of Beebe but two of the judges didn't see it that way and handed Mike Easton a controversial split decision victory. The controversial decision was awarded Robbery of the Year by Sherdog for 2009. It has been announced that the Virginia Athletic Commission would review the Easton match which could lead to a “no contest” declaration.

=== Dream ===
Chase was one of the fighters who participated in DREAM's Featherweight (63 kg/138 lb) Grand Prix. He lost in the first round to Joe Warren.

Chase returned to DREAM to face Yoshiro Maeda on October 25, 2009, at DREAM.12 He lost to Maeda via first round submission.

=== Bellator Fighting Championships ===
Beebe made his Bellator debut against Jose Vega at Bellator 43 in a Bellator Season 5 Bantamweight Tournament qualifying bout, Beebe won via guillotine choke submission in round one.

Chase entered into the Bellator Fighting Championships season five bantamweight tournament and fought Marcos Galvao in a Quarterfinal bout at Bellator 51 on September 24, 2011, Beebe lost via split decision.

Beebe defeated David Harris at Bellator 75 via unanimous decision. Beebe was defeated by Travis Marx via unanimous decision at Bellator 90

== Championships and awards ==
- World Extreme Cagefighting
  - WEC Bantamweight Championship (One time)
    - One successful title defense
- World Fighting Championships
  - WFC Bantamweight Championship (One time)
- Sherdog
  - Robbery of the Year (2009) vs. Mike Easton For UWC Bantamweight Championship

== Mixed martial arts record ==
Professional record breakdown
38 matches	24 wins	13 losses
By knockout	1	3
By submission	17	3
By decision	6	7
Draws	1	

Res.	Record	Opponent	Method	Event	Date	Round	Time	Location	Notes
Loss	24–13–1	Vincent Eazelle	TKO (punches)	CCCW: The Undertaking	September 13, 2014	2	0:08	Springfield, Illinois, United States	
Loss	24–12–1	Ryan Roberts	Decision (unanimous)	Victory Fighting Championship 42	March 15, 2014	3	5:00	Omaha, Nebraska, United States	
Loss	24–11–1	Joni Salovaara	Submission (rear naked choke)	Fight Festival 33	October 5, 2013	1	3:48	Helsinki, Finland	
Loss	24–10–1	Tom Niinimäki	Decision (unanimous)	Cage 22	May 11, 2013	3	5:00	Vantaa, Finland	
Loss	24–9–1	Travis Marx	Decision (unanimous)	Bellator 90	February 21, 2013	3	5:00	West Valley City, Utah, United States	Catchweight (137 lb) bout.
Win	24–8–1	Chris Tickle	Decision (unanimous)	Flawless FC 2-Hated	December 15, 2012	3	5:00	Hammond, Indiana, United States	
Win	23–8–1	Javon Wright	Submission (rear naked choke)	Fight Hard MMA	November 10, 2012	1	4:11	St. Charles, Missouri, United States	
Win	22–8–1	David Harris	Decision (unanimous)	Bellator 75	October 5, 2012	3	5:00	Hammond, Indiana, United States	
Win	21–8–1	Mike Baskis	Decision (unanimous)	XFO 44	June 16, 2012	3	5:00	Hoffman Estates, Illinois, United States	
Win	20–8–1	Corey Mahon	KO (elbows)	Colosseum Combat 21	May 12, 2012	1	2:13	Kokomo, Indiana, United States	
Win	19–8–1	David Love	Submission (rear naked choke)	Colosseum Combat 20	March 10, 2012	1	3:02	Kokomo, Indiana, United States	
Draw	18–8–1	Enoch Wilson	Draw (majority)	UCS - Caged Combat 5	December 9, 2011	5	5:00	Grand Ronde, Oregon, United States	
Loss	18–8	Marcos Galvão	Decision (split)	Bellator 51	September 24, 2011	3	5:00	Canton, Ohio, United States	Bellator Season 5 Bantamweight Tournament Quarterfinal.
Win	18–7	Ralph Acosta	Submission (guillotine choke)	WFC 2: Bad Boys	July 9, 2011	1	0:41	London, England	Won the WFC Bantamweight Championship.
Win	17–7	Jose Vega	Submission (guillotine choke)	Bellator 43	May 7, 2011	1	4:06	Newkirk, Oklahoma, United States	Bellator Season 5 Bantamweight Tournament Qualifier.
Win	16–7	Steve Kinnison	Decision (unanimous)	Chicago Cagefighting Championship	March 5, 2011	3	5:00	Villa Park, Illinois, United States	
Win	15–7	Josh Kasee	Submission (rear-naked choke)	Ruckus Entertainment: Ruckus 4	November 24, 2010	1	4:56	Addison, Illinois, United States	
Win	14–7	Jared McMahan	Submission (guillotine choke)	Chicago Cagefighting Championship	October 16, 2010	1	1:19	Villa Park, Illinois, United States	Return to Bantamweight.
Loss	13–7	Hiroyuki Takaya	KO (punches)	Dream 16	September 25, 2010	1	1:45	Nagoya, Japan	
Win	13–6	Pablo Alfonso	Submission (rear-naked choke)	Ruckus Entertainment: Ruckus Invades Navy Pier	September 11, 2010	1	2:32	Chicago, Illinois, United States	
Win	12–6	William Jochum	Submission (guillotine choke)	Lords of War 1	April 24, 2010	1	1:03	Addison, Illinois, United States	Return to Featherweight.
Loss	11–6	Yoshiro Maeda	Submission (rear-naked choke)	Dream 12	October 25, 2009	1	3:36	Osaka, Japan	
Loss	11–5	Mike Easton	Decision (split)	UWC 7: Redemption	October 3, 2009	5	5:00	Fairfax, Virginia, United States	For the UWC Bantamweight Championship.
Loss	11–4	Joe Warren	TKO (doctor stoppage)	Dream 7	March 8, 2009	1	10:00	Saitama, Japan	Dream Featherweight Grand Prix Opening Round.
Loss	11–3	Will Ribeiro	Decision (split)	WEC 34: Faber vs. Pulver	June 1, 2008	3	5:00	Sacramento, California, United States	
Loss	11–2	Miguel Torres	Submission (guillotine choke)	WEC 32: Condit vs. Prater	February 13, 2008	1	3:59	Rio Rancho, New Mexico, United States	Lost the WEC Bantamweight Championship.
Win	11–1	Rani Yahya	Decision (unanimous)	WEC 30	September 5, 2007	5	5:00	Las Vegas, Nevada, United States	Defended the WEC Bantamweight Championship.
Win	10–1	Eddie Wineland	Decision (unanimous)	WEC 26: Condit vs. Alessio	March 24, 2007	5	5:00	Las Vegas, Nevada, United States	Won the WEC Bantamweight Championship.
Win	9–1	Mike Bennett	Submission (rear-naked choke)	KOTC: Hard Knocks	January 19, 2007	1	2:44	Rockford, Illinois, United States	
Win	8–1	Sam Jackson	Submission (rear-naked choke)	XFO 14	December 9, 2006	1	2:36	Lakemoor, Illinois, United States	
Win	7–1	Mike Bennetta	Submission (guillotine choke)	Courage Fighting Championships 7	November 25, 2006	1	0:45	Decatur, Illinois, United States	
Win	6–1	Aaron Jamieson	Submission (punches)	Midwest Absolute Challenge 3	October 7, 2006	1	0:45	Countryside, Illinois, United States	
Win	5–1	Mike Lindquist	Submission (rear-naked choke)	Evolution Fighting Championships 2	September 15, 2006	1	1:40	Machesney Park, Illinois, United States	
Loss	4–1	Matt Fiordirosa	Decision (unanimous)	XFO 12: Outdoor War 2	August 19, 2006	3	5:00	Island Lake, Illinois, United States	
Win	4–0	Nick Hoff	Submission (rear-naked choke)	Courage Fighting Championships 6	July 15, 2006	1	2:24	Island Lake, Illinois, United States	
Win	3–0	Ben Miller	Submission (rear-naked choke)	Evolution Fighting Championships	July 7, 2006	1	2:49	Machesney Park, Illinois, United States	
Win	2–0	Cody Geertz	Submission (rear-naked choke)	Iowa Challenge 29	June 10, 2006	1	1:01	Quincy, Illinois, United States	
Win	1–0	Jesse Rongey	Submission (guillotine choke)	Courage Fighting Championships 5	April 29, 2006	1	0:27	Decatur, Illinois, United States	

Preceded by Eddie Wineland	2nd WEC Bantamweight Champion; March 24, 2007 - February 13, 2008	Succeeded by Miguel Torres
