= Luiz Cané =

Brazilian mixed martial arts fighter

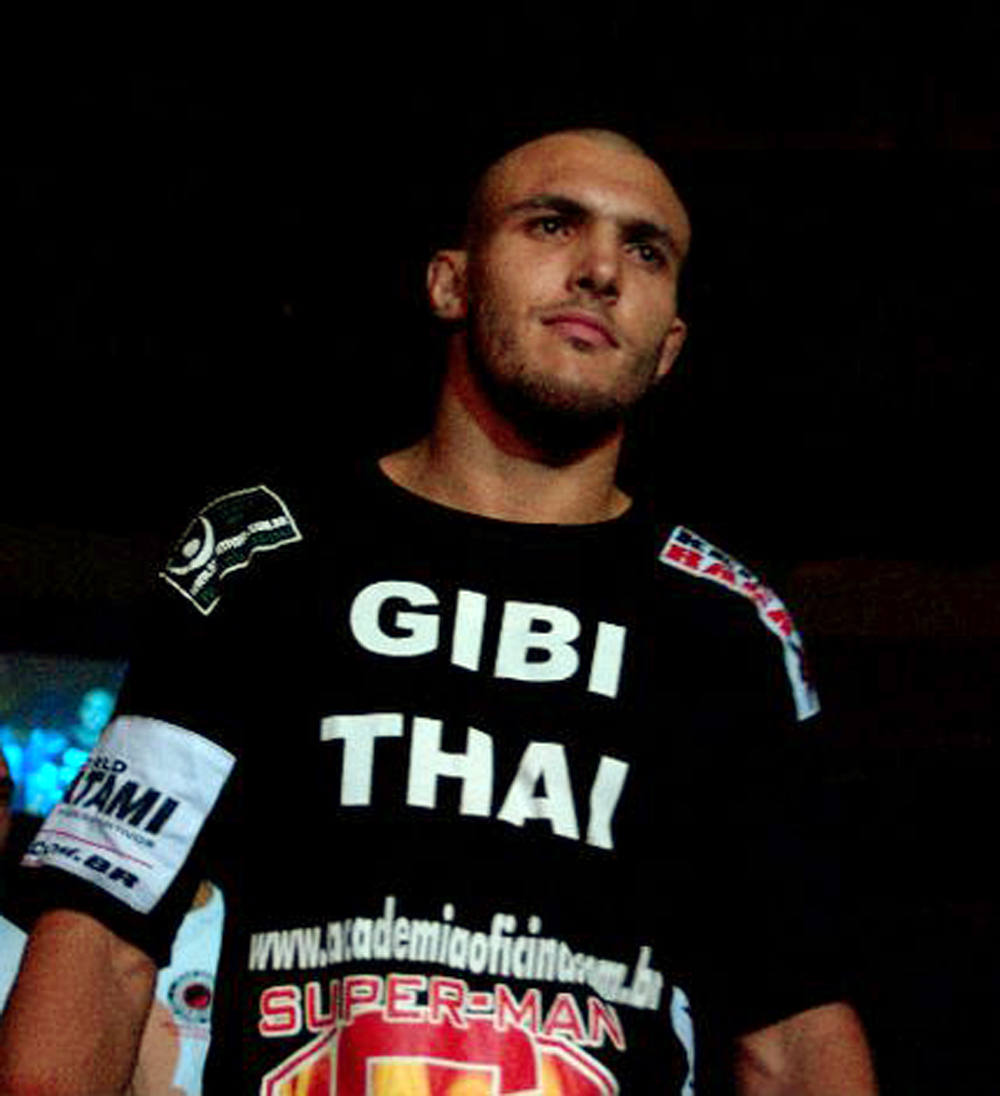
- Born: Luiz Arthuro Cané Jr. 2 April 1981 (age 45); São Paulo, Brazil
- Other names: Banha
- Height: 6 ft 2 in (1.88 m)
- Weight: 205 lb (93 kg; 14.6 st)
- Division: Light Heavyweight; Middleweight
- Reach: 77 in (196 cm)
- Style: Muay Thai, Kickboxing, BJJ
- Team: The Armory
- Rank: Black belt in Brazilian Jiu-Jitsu
- Years active: 2005–present

Mixed martial arts record
- Total: 25
- Wins: 17
- By knockout: 14
- By submission: 1
- By decision: 2
- Losses: 7
- By knockout: 5
- By decision: 1
- By disqualification: 1
- No contests: 1

Other information
- Mixed martial arts record from Sherdog

Luiz Arthuro Cané Jr. (born 2 April 1981) is a Brazilian mixed martial artist currently competing in the Light Heavyweight division. A professional competitor since 2005, Cané has formerly competed for the UFC.

== Background ==
Born and raised in the Jardim Bonfiglioli neighborhood, located in the district of Butantan, west side of the city of São Paulo, Luiz Cané alternated working hours in a restaurant with his parents, with hours of training in Jiu-Jitsu Academy Gracie Butantã with Ryan Gracie, and Muay Thai with the team Gibi Thai / Pamplona, of the fighters Mosés Gibi and Eduardo Pamplona.

== Mixed martial arts career ==
=== Ultimate Fighting Championship ===
Cané lost in his UFC debut at UFC 79 via disqualification when he threw an illegal knee to a downed James Irvin.

Cané later defeated Jason Lambert via first-round TKO at UFC 85 in England.

Cané won his second straight fight over Rameau Thierry Sokoudjou on 18 October 2008, at UFC 89 via TKO in the second round. He earned Knockout of the Night honors with his performance.

At UFC 97 on 18 April 2009 he defeated Steve Cantwell via unanimous decision where he displayed a good chin and disciplined striking ability.

Cané was TKO'ed by Antônio Rogério Nogueira in the first round of their fight on 21 November 2009, at UFC 106. A left hook to the jaw sent Cané to the floor as Nogueira finished with a series of punches on the ground.

Cané fought UFC newcomer Cyrille Diabate on 29 May 2010, at UFC 114 and lost via first-round TKO after rocking Diabate early in the fight.

Cané was expected to face Karlos Vemola on 19 March 2011 at UFC 128. However, Vemola was forced from the bout with an injury and replaced by Eliot Marshall. He won the fight via TKO in the first round.

Cané next faced promotional newcomer Stanislav Nedkov on 27 August 2011 at UFC 134. After out-striking and bloodying Nedkov early on, Cané lost via TKO near the end of the first round.

Cané was expected to make his Middleweight debut against Yushin Okami on 11 August 2012 at UFC 150. However, Cané was forced out of the bout with an injury and replaced by Rousimar Palhares. Rousimar Palhares was forced out of the bout because of injury and was later replaced by Buddy Roberts.

Cané fought Chris Camozzi on 13 October 2012 at UFC 153 in his Middleweight debut. Despite a strong first round, he ultimately lost the fight via unanimous decision. Following the loss he was released from the UFC.

=== Post-UFC ===
After a long layoff from the sport, Cané returned as a Light Heavyweight and faced Rodney Wallace at SFT 1 on 20 September 2013. Cané won via KO in the first round.

Cané followed up by defeating Fábio Silva via unanimous decision at SFT 2 on 29 November 2013.

Cané faced Alexandre Zaneti on 4 October 2014 at Brazilian Fighting Championship 4. He lost the fight via TKO in the second round.

Cané faced Wesley Martins Garcia de Almeida at Thunder Fight 2: MMA Championship on 19 December 2014. He won the fight via KO due to a punch in the first round.

Cané faced fellow UFC veteran Matt Hamill at Fight 2 Night 2 on 28 April 2017 in Brazil. He lost the fight via knockout in the first round.

== Personal life ==
Cané trains with UFC fighter Demian Maia in São Paulo.

== Championships and Accomplishments ==
- Ultimate Fighting Championship
  - Knockout of the Night (One time) vs. Rameau Sokoudjou

== Mixed martial arts record ==
Professional record breakdown
25 matches	17 wins	7 losses
By knockout	14	5
By submission	1	0
By decision	2	1
By disqualification	0	1
No contests	1	

Res.	Record	Opponent	Method	Event	Date	Round	Time	Location	Notes
Loss	17–7 (1)	Matt Hamill	KO (punches)	F2N: Fight2Night2	28 April 2017	1	0:38	Foz do Iguaçu, Brazil	
Win	17–6 (1)	Mateus Messaros Inacio	TKO (punches)	Predador FC 35	24 September 2016	1	2:00	São Paulo, Brazil	
Win	16–6 (1)	Felipe Silva	TKO (punches)	Shooto Brazil 54	17 May 2015	1	0:49	Rio de Janeiro, Brazil	
Win	15–6 (1)	Wesley Martins Garcia de Almeida	KO (punch)	Thunder Fight 2: MMA Championship	19 December 2014	1	1:04	São Paulo, Brazil	
Loss	14–6 (1)	Alexandre Zaneti	TKO (punches)	Brazilian Fighting Championship 4	4 October 2014	2	3:20	São Paulo, Brazil	
Win	14–5 (1)	Fábio Silva	Decision (unanimous)	SFT 2	29 November 2013	3	5:00	São Paulo, Brazil	
Win	13–5 (1)	Rodney Wallace	KO (flying knee and punches)	SFT 1	21 September 2013	1	3:56	São Paulo, Brazil	Return to Light Heavyweight.
Loss	12–5 (1)	Chris Camozzi	Decision (unanimous)	UFC 153	13 October 2012	3	5:00	Rio de Janeiro, Brazil	Middleweight debut.
Loss	12–4 (1)	Stanislav Nedkov	TKO (punches)	UFC 134	27 August 2011	1	4:13	Rio de Janeiro, Brazil	
Win	12–3 (1)	Eliot Marshall	TKO (punches)	UFC 128	19 March 2011	1	2:15	Newark, New Jersey, United States	
Loss	11–3 (1)	Cyrille Diabate	TKO (punches)	UFC 114	29 May 2010	1	2:13	Las Vegas, Nevada, United States	
Loss	11–2 (1)	Antônio Rogério Nogueira	TKO (punches)	UFC 106	21 November 2009	1	1:56	Las Vegas, Nevada, United States	
Win	11–1 (1)	Steve Cantwell	Decision (unanimous)	UFC 97	18 April 2009	3	5:00	Montreal, Canada	
Win	10–1 (1)	Rameau Sokoudjou	TKO (punches)	UFC 89	18 October 2008	2	4:15	Birmingham, United Kingdom	Knockout of the Night.
Win	9–1 (1)	Jason Lambert	TKO (punches)	UFC 85	7 June 2008	1	2:07	London, United Kingdom	
Loss	8–1 (1)	James Irvin	DQ (illegal knee)	UFC 79	29 December 2007	1	1:51	Las Vegas, Nevada, United States	Cané was disqualified for kneeing Irvin while grounded.
Win	8–0 (1)	James Damien Stelly	KO (knee)	Art of War 3	1 September 2007	1	2:45	Dallas, Texas, United States	
Win	7–0 (1)	Wagner Ribeiro	Submission (soccer kicks)	Minotauro Fights 5	9 December 2006	1	2:53	São Paulo, Brazil	
Win	6–0 (1)	Joao Assis	TKO (punches)	Fury FC 2: Final Combat	30 November 2006	1	3:41	São Paulo, Brazil	
Win	5–0 (1)	Thiago Cardoso Capataz	TKO	Mega Fight 3	21 October 2006	N/A	N/A	São Paulo, Brazil	
Win	4–0 (1)	Mauricio Menegueti	TKO (punches)	CF: Coliseum Fight	16 September 2006	1	2:20	São Paulo, Brazil	
Win	3–0 (1)	Gilson Ricardo	TKO (punches)	Predador FC 2	11 August 2006	1	2:25	São Paulo, Brazil	
Win	2–0 (1)	Maurice Igor	TKO	Coliseu Fight	22 July 2006	N/A	N/A	São Paulo, Brazil	
Win	1–0 (1)	Andre Gustavo	TKO (corner stoppage)	Estancia Fight 2	28 May 2006	1	N/A	São Paulo, Brazil	
NC	0–0 (1)	Marcelo Alfaya	No Contest	Campeonato Brasileiro de Vale-Tudo	5 November 2005	1	3:01	São Paulo, Brazil	Alfaya could not continue after an inadvertent groin kick.
