= UFC 135 =

UFC mixed martial arts event in 2011

UFC 135: Jones vs. Rampage
- The poster for UFC 135: Jones vs. Rampage
- Promotion: Ultimate Fighting Championship
- Date: September 24, 2011
- Venue: Pepsi Center
- City: Denver, Colorado
- Attendance: 16,344
- Total gate: $2,089,575
- Buyrate: 520,000

Event chronology
UFC Fight Night: Shields vs. Ellenberger	UFC 135: Jones vs. Rampage	UFC Live: Cruz vs. Johnson

UFC 135: Jones vs. Rampage was a mixed martial arts event held by the Ultimate Fighting Championship on September 24, 2011, at the Pepsi Center in Denver, Colorado.

== Background ==
The Ultimate Fighting Championship had its first ever event in Denver nearly 20 years prior to UFC 135, but the promotion has not operated a pay-per-view event in the Mile High City since The Ultimate Ultimate in 1995. Zuffa, the UFC's parent company, was not the owner back then. UFC president Dana White, in an interview with MMAWeekly.com, says that the company has long been on a course to return to Denver, but they wanted to do it the right way. “We knew that we wanted to bring a big exciting card back to Denver, and we finally got it done.”

Jon Jones was expected to make his first title defense on August 6, 2011, at UFC 133 against Rashad Evans, but Jones was sidelined with a hand injury. It was initially announced that the hand injury would require surgery, but Jones opted for rest and rehabilitation without surgery after further consultations with doctors. Jones' injury was originally thought to keep him out of action until late 2011, but instead, he made his first title defense against Quinton Jackson at this event.

UFC 135 featured two preliminary fights live on Spike TV.

Manny Gamburyan was scheduled to face Diego Nunes. However, on August 15, it was announced Gamburyan had to pull out of the bout due to a shoulder injury. Then, on August 29, Nunes confirmed his own exit from the card, citing injury and a murder attempt on his father. The fight was later rescheduled for UFC 141, where Nunes won via unanimous decision.

A bout between Norifumi Yamamoto and Damacio Page was expected for this event. However, the bout was scrapped on September 1 after both fighters sustained injuries while training for the bout.

Diego Sanchez was expected to face Matt Hughes, but was forced out of the bout with a broken hand and replaced by Josh Koscheck. After this fight Matt Hughes was offered a non competitive role in the UFC which resulted in his retirement from MMA.

== Results ==
Main Card
Weight class				Method	Round	Time	Notes
Light Heavyweight	Jon Jones (c)	def.	Quinton Jackson	Submission (rear-naked choke)	4	1:14	(Note: For the UFC Light Heavyweight Championship.)
Welterweight	Josh Koscheck	def.	Matt Hughes	KO (punches)	1	4:59
Heavyweight	Mark Hunt	def.	Ben Rothwell	Decision (unanimous) (29–28, 29–27, 30–27)	3	5:00
Heavyweight	Travis Browne	def.	Rob Broughton	Decision (unanimous) (30–27, 30–27, 30–27)	3	5:00
Lightweight	Nate Diaz	def.	Takanori Gomi	Submission (armbar)	1	4:27
Preliminary card (Spike TV)
Weight class				Method	Round	Time	Notes
Lightweight	Tony Ferguson	def.	Aaron Riley	TKO (corner stoppage)	1	5:00
Middleweight	Tim Boetsch	def.	Nick Ring	Decision (unanimous) (29–28, 29–28, 30–27)	3	5:00
Preliminary card (Facebook)
Weight class				Method	Round	Time	Notes
Featherweight	Junior Assunção	def.	Eddie Yagin	Decision (unanimous) (30–26, 30–26, 30–27)	3	5:00
Bantamweight	Takeya Mizugaki	def.	Cole Escovedo	TKO (punches)	2	4:30	(Note: This bout aired last on PPV broadcast following the Jones vs. Jackson fight.)
Light Heavyweight	James Te Huna	def.	Ricardo Romero	KO (punches)	1	0:47	(Note: This bout aired on the Spike broadcast following the Ferguson vs. Riley fight.)

== Bonus awards ==
The following fighters received $75,000 bonuses.

- Fight of the Night: Jon Jones vs. Quinton Jackson
- Knockout of the Night: Josh Koscheck
- Submission of the Night: Nate Diaz
