= Light heavyweight (MMA) =

MMA weight class

The light heavyweight division in mixed martial arts contains different weight classes.

- The UFC's light heavyweight ranges from 186 to 205 lb (84 to 93 kg).
- The ONE Championship's light heavyweight division (also known as cruiserweight) has an upper limit of 102.1 kg (225.1 lb).
- The Road FC's light heavyweight division places the upper limit at 205 lb (93 kg).
- The Misfits MMA's light heavyweight division uses the boxing light heavyweight format. (175 Ib limit).

Light heavyweight is a weight class in mixed martial arts, which generally refers to competitors weighing from 186 to 205 lb (84 to 93 kg). It sits between the lighter middleweight division, and the heavyweight division. The light heavyweight limit, as defined by the Nevada State Athletic Commission and the Association of Boxing Commissions is 206 lb (93 kg).

== Professional champions ==
=== Current champions ===
This table last updated in July 2026.

Organization	Reign Began	Champion	Record	Defenses
UFC	April 11, 2026	(New Zealand) Carlos Ulberg	14–1 (9KO 1SUB)	0
PFL	October 3, 2025	(United States) Corey Anderson	20-6 (9KO 0SUB)	0
ONE	Vacant			
Rizin FF	Vacant			
Misfits MMA	August 30, 2025	(United States) Dillon Danis	3–0 (3SUB)	0
ACA	December 15, 2024	(Russia) Adlan Ibragimov	9–2 (2KO 3SUB)	0
KSW	July 18, 2026	(Poland) Bartosz Leśko	17-6-2 (2KO 7SUB)	0
Fight Nights Global	August 28, 2020	(Armenia) Armen Petrosyan	4-0 (4KO 0SUB)	1
Cage Warriors	November 15, 2024	(England) James Webb	12-5-1 (3KO 6SUB)	1
URCC	April 23, 2016	(Philippines) Chris Hofmann	8-1 (7KO)	3
Oktagon	December 29, 2024	(Republic of Ireland) Will Fleury	14-3	0
Brave CF	June 7, 2025	(France) Mohammad Fakhreddine	18-5 (2) (15KO 1SUB)	0

== See also ==
- List of current MMA Light Heavyweight champions
- List of UFC Light Heavyweight Champions
- List of UFC Light Heavyweight fighters
- List of Strikeforce Light Heavyweight Champions
- List of Pancrase Light Heavyweight Champions
