= 2008 in UFC =

Mixed martial arts events

Information
- First date: January 19, 2008
- Last date: December 27, 2008

Events
- Total events: 20
- UFC: 13
- UFC Fight Night: 5
- TUF Finale events: 2

Fights
- Total fights: 201
- Title fights: 11

Chronology
2007 in UFC	2008 in UFC	2009 in UFC

The year 2008 was the 16th year in the history of the Ultimate Fighting Championship (UFC), a mixed martial arts promotion based in the United States. In 2008 the UFC held 20 events beginning with, UFC 80: Rapid Fire.

== 2008 UFC.com awards ==
2008 UFC.COM Awards
No	Best Fighter	The Upsets	The Submissions	The Newcomers	The Knockouts	The Fights
1	Rashad Evans	Frank Mir defeats Antônio Rodrigo Nogueira 1 UFC 92	Dustin Hazelett defeats Josh Burkman; The Ultimate Fighter 7 Finale	Brock Lesnar	Rashad Evans defeats Chuck Liddell; UFC 88	Forrest Griffin defeats Quinton Jackson; UFC 86
2	Thiago Alves	Junior dos Santos defeats Fabrício Werdum; UFC 90	Frank Mir defeats Brock Lesnar; UFC 81	Cain Velasquez	Junior dos Santos defeats Fabrício Werdum; UFC 90	Kurt Pellegrino defeats Thiago Tavares; UFC 88
3	Kenny Florian	Rashad Evans defeats Chuck Liddell; UFC 88	Anderson Silva defeats Dan Henderson; UFC 82	Amir Sadollah	Anthony Johnson defeats Kevin Burns; The Ultimate Fighter 8 Finale	Matt Wiman defeats Thiago Tavares; UFC 85
4	Anderson Silva	Kevin Burns defeats Roan Carneiro; UFC 85	Kenny Florian defeats Joe Stevenson; UFC 91	Shane Carwin	Thiago Alves defeats Karo Parisyan at UFC Fight Night: Florian vs. Lauzon & Matt Hughes at UFC 85	Sean Sherk defeats Tyson Griffin; UFC 90
5	Frank Mir	Forrest Griffin defeats Quinton Jackson; UFC 86	Antônio Rodrigo Nogueira defeats Tim Sylvia; UFC Fight Night: Lauzon vs. Stephens	Junior dos Santos	Quinton Jackson defeats Wanderlei Silva; UFC 92	Demian Maia defeats Jason MacDonald; UFC 87
6	Georges St-Pierre	Jorge Rivera defeats Jorge Gurgel; UFC 80	Cole Miller defeats Brian Foster; UFC 86	Efraín Escudero	James Irvin defeats Houston Alexander; UFC Fight Night: Florian vs. Lauzon	Georges St-Pierre defeats Jon Fitch; UFC 87
7	Brock Lesnar	Heath Herring defeats Cheick Kongo; UFC 82	Nate Diaz defeats Kurt Pellegrino; UFC Fight Night: Florian vs. Lauzon	The Miller Brothers; Jim Miller and Dan Miller	Wanderlei Silva defeats Keith Jardine; UFC 84	Nate Diaz defeats Kurt Pellegrino; UFC Fight Night: Florian vs. Lauzon
8	B.J. Penn	Brock Lesnar defeats Randy Couture; UFC 91	Demian Maia defeats Jason MacDonald; UFC 87	Tim Boetsch	Josh Koscheck defeats Yoshiyuki Yoshida; UFC: Fight for the Troops	Nate Diaz defeats Josh Neer; UFC Fight Night: Diaz vs. Neer
9	Nate Diaz	Pete Sell defeats Josh Burkman; UFC 90	Kevin Burns defeats Roan Carneiro; UFC 185	Kevin Burns	Rory Markham defeats Brodie Farber; UFC Fight Night: Silva vs. Irvin	Goran Reljić defeats Wilson Gouveia; UFC 84
10	Michael Bisping	Jason Day defeats Alan Belcher; UFC 83	Dustin Hazelett defeats Tamdan McCrory; UFC 85	C. B. Dollaway	Jeremy Stephens defeats Rafael dos Anjos; UFC 91	Paul Kelly defeats Paul Taylor; UFC 180
Ref						

== Debut UFC fighters ==
The following fighters fought their first UFC fight in 2008:

ISO	Fighter	Division
(Brazil)	Andre Gusmao	Light Heavyweight
(Brazil)	Antonio Mendes	Light Heavyweight
(United States)	Brad Blackburn	Welterweight
(Australia)	Brad Morris	Heavyweight
(United States)	Brandon Wolff	Welterweight
(United States)	Brock Lesnar	Heavyweight
(United States)	Brodie Farber	Welterweight
(United States)	Cain Velasquez	Heavyweight
(United States)	C. B. Dollaway	Middleweight
(United States)	Chris Wilson	Welterweight
(United States)	Corey Hill	Lightweight
(United States)	Dale Hartt	Lightweight
(Norway)	Dan Evensen	Heavyweight
(England)	Dan Hardy	Welterweight
(United States)	Dan Miller	Middleweight
(United States)	Dante Rivera	Middleweight
(United States)	Dave Kaplan	Lightweight
(France)	David Baron	Lightweight
(Sweden)	David Bielkheden	Welterweight
(South Korea)	Dong Hyun Kim	Welterweight
(Mexico)	Efraín Escudero	Lightweight
(United States)	Eliot Marshall	Light Heavyweight
(United States)	George Roop	Lightweight
(Croatia)	Goran Reljić	Light Heavyweight
(United States)	James Giboo	Lightweight

ISO	Fighter	Division
(United States)	James Lee	Light Heavyweight
(United States)	Jason Brilz	Light Heavyweight
(Canada)	Jason Day	Middleweight
(United States)	Jesse Taylor	Middleweight
(United States)	Jim Miller	Lightweight
(United States)	Joe Vedepo	Middleweight
(United States)	Johnny Rees	Middleweight
(United States)	Jon Jones	Light Heavyweight
(United States)	Josh Hendricks	Heavyweight
(United States)	Jules Bruchez	Middleweight
(Brazil)	Junior dos Santos	Heavyweight
(United States)	Justin Buchholz	Lightweight
(United States)	Kevin Burns	Welterweight
(Canada)	Krzysztof Soszynski	Light Heavyweight
(United States)	Kyle Kingsbury	Light Heavyweight
(United States)	Matt Brown	Welterweight
(United States)	Matt Horwich	Middleweight
(United States)	Matt Riddle	Welterweight
(United States)	Michael Patt	Light Heavyweight
(United States)	Mike Massenzio	Middleweight
(United States)	Mike Wessel	Heavyweight
(England)	Mostapha al-Turk	Heavyweight
(United States)	Nate Loughran	Welterweight
(England)	Neil Wain	Heavyweight
(United States)	Pat Barry	Heavyweight

ISO	Fighter	Division
(England)	Paul Kelly	Lightweight
(Sweden)	Per Eklund	Lightweight
(United States)	Phillipe Nover	Lightweight
(Brazil)	Rafael dos Anjos	Lightweight
(United States)	Reese Andy	Light Heavyweight
(United States)	Rob Kimmons	Middleweight
(United States)	Rob Yundt	Middleweight
(United States)	Rolando Delgado	Lightweight
(United States)	Rory Markham	Welterweight
(Brazil)	Rousimar Palhares	Middleweight
(United States)	Ryan Bader	Light Heavyweight
(United States)	Ryan Roberts	Lightweight
(United States)	Ryan Thomas	Welterweight
(France)	Samy Schiavo	Lightweight
(United States)	Shane Carwin	Heavyweight
(United States)	Shane Nelson	Lightweight
(United States)	Shane Primm	Light Heavyweight
(United States)	Shannon Gugerty	Lightweight
(United States)	Steve Bruno	Welterweight
(United States)	Steve Cantwell	Light Heavyweight
(United States)	Tim Boetsch	Light Heavyweight
(United States)	Tim Credeur	Middleweight
(United States)	Tom Lawlor	Middleweight
(Brazil)	Vinny Magalhães	Light Heavyweight
(Japan)	Yoshiyuki Yoshida	Welterweight

== The Ultimate Fighter ==
Season	Finale	Division	Winner	Runner-up
TUF 7: Team Rampage vs. Team Forrest	Jun 21, 2008	Middleweight	Amir Sadollah	C.B. Dollaway
TUF 8: Team Nogueira vs. Team Mir	Dec 13, 2008	Light Heavyweight	Ryan Bader	Vinicius Magalhães
TUF 8: Team Nogueira vs. Team Mir	Dec 13, 2008	Lightweight	Efraín Escudero	Phillipe Nover

== Title fights ==
Title fights in 2008
Weight class				Method	Round	Time	Event	Notes
Lightweight	B.J. Penn	def.	Joe Stevenson	Submission (rear-naked choke)	2	4:02	UFC 80: Rapid Fire	(Note: For the vacant UFC Lightweight Championship. Penn become the second fighter in UFC history to win belt with two weight classes.)
Heavyweight	Antônio Rodrigo Nogueira	def.	Tim Sylvia	Submission (guillotine choke)	3	1:28	UFC 81: Breaking Point	(Note: For the UFC Interim Heavyweight Championship.)
Middleweight	Anderson Silva (UFC Champion)	def.	Dan Henderson (Pride Champion)	Submission (rear-naked choke)	2	4:52	UFC 82: Pride of a Champion	(Note: Unification of the UFC Middleweight & Pride Welterweight Championship belts)
Welterweight	Georges St-Pierre (ic)	def.	Matt Serra (c)	TKO (knees)	2	4:45	UFC 83: Serra vs St-Pierre 2	(Note: Unification of the UFC Welterweight & UFC Interim Welterweight championships.)
Lightweight	B.J. Penn (c)	def.	Sean Sherk	TKO (flying knee and punches)	3	5:00	UFC 84: Ill Will	(Note: For the UFC Lightweight Championship.)
Light Heavyweight	Forrest Griffin	def.	Quinton Jackson (c)	Decision (unanimous) (48–46, 48–46, 49–46)	5	5:00	UFC 86: Jackson vs. Griffin	(Note: For the UFC Light Heavyweight Championship)
Welterweight	Georges St-Pierre (c)	def.	Jon Fitch	Decision (unanimous) (50–44, 50–43, 50–44)	5	5:00	UFC 87: Seek and Destroy	(Note: For the UFC Welterweight Championship)
Middleweight	Anderson Silva (c)	def.	Patrick Côté	TKO (knee injury)	3	0:39	UFC 90: Silva vs. Côté	(Note: For the UFC Middleweight Championship.)
Heavyweight	Brock Lesnar	def.	Randy Couture (c)	TKO (punches)	2	3:07	UFC 91: Couture vs. Lesnar	(Note: For the UFC Heavyweight Championship.)
Heavyweight	Frank Mir	def.	Antônio Nogueira (ic)	TKO (punches)	2	1:54	UFC 92: The Ultimate 2008	(Note: For the UFC Interim Heavyweight Championship.)
Light Heavyweight	Rashad Evans	def.	Forrest Griffin (c)	KO (punches)	3	2:46	UFC 92: The Ultimate 2008	(Note: For the UFC Light Heavyweight Championship. Both winners of The Ultimate Fighter competed in a title fight against each other.)

== Events list ==
#	Event	Date	Venue	Location	Attendance
122	UFC 92: The Ultimate 2008	Dec 27, 2008	MGM Grand Garden Arena	Las Vegas, Nevada, U.S.	14,166
121	The Ultimate Fighter: Team Nogueira vs. Team Mir Finale	Dec 13, 2008	Palms Casino Resort	Las Vegas, Nevada, U.S.	1,853
120	UFC: Fight for the Troops	Dec 10, 2008	Crown Coliseum	Fayetteville, North Carolina, U.S.	8,500
119	UFC 91: Couture vs. Lesnar	Nov 15, 2008	MGM Grand Garden Arena	Las Vegas, Nevada, U.S.	14,272
118	UFC 90: Silva vs. Côté	Oct 25, 2008	Allstate Arena	Rosemont, Illinois, U.S.	15,359
117	UFC 89: Bisping vs. Leben	Oct 18, 2008	National Indoor Arena	Birmingham, England, U.K.	9,515
116	UFC Fight Night: Diaz vs. Neer	Sep 17, 2008	Omaha Civic Auditorium	Omaha, Nebraska, U.S.	9,103
115	UFC 88: Breakthrough	Sep 6, 2008	Philips Arena	Atlanta, Georgia, U.S.	14,736
114	UFC 87: Seek and Destroy	Aug 9, 2008	Target Center	Minneapolis, Minnesota, U.S.	15,087
113	UFC Fight Night: Silva vs. Irvin	Jul 19, 2008	Palms Casino Resort	Las Vegas, Nevada, U.S.	2,071
112	UFC 86: Jackson vs. Griffin	Jul 5, 2008	Mandalay Bay Events Center	Las Vegas, Nevada, U.S.	10,990
111	The Ultimate Fighter: Team Rampage vs. Team Forrest Finale	Jun 21, 2008	Palms Casino Resort	Las Vegas, Nevada, U.S.	1,853
110	UFC 85: Bedlam	Jun 7, 2008	The O_{2} arena	London, England, U.K.	15,327
109	UFC 84: Ill Will	May 24, 2008	MGM Grand Garden Arena	Las Vegas, Nevada, U.S.	14,773
108	UFC 83: Serra vs. St-Pierre 2	Apr 19, 2008	Bell Centre	Montreal, Quebec, Canada	21,390
107	UFC Fight Night: Florian vs. Lauzon	Apr 2, 2008	Broomfield Event Center	Broomfield, Colorado, U.S.	6,742
106	UFC 82: Pride of a Champion	Mar 1, 2008	Nationwide Arena	Columbus, Ohio, U.S.	16,431
105	UFC 81: Breaking Point	Feb 2, 2008	Mandalay Bay Events Center	Las Vegas, Nevada, U.S.	10,583
104	UFC Fight Night: Swick vs. Burkman	Jan 23, 2008	Palms Casino Resort	Las Vegas, Nevada, U.S.	1,900
103	UFC 80: Rapid Fire	Jan 19, 2008	Metro Radio Arena	Newcastle, England, U.K.	8,412

== See also ==
- UFC
- List of UFC champions
- List of UFC events
