= UFC 85 =

UFC mixed martial arts event in 2008

UFC 85: Bedlam
- The poster for UFC 85: Bedlam
- Promotion: Ultimate Fighting Championship
- Date: June 7, 2008
- Venue: The O_{2} Arena
- City: London, United Kingdom
- Attendance: 15,327
- Total gate: 2,920,000
- Buyrate: 215,000

Event chronology
UFC 84: Ill Will	UFC 85: Bedlam	The Ultimate Fighter: Team Rampage vs. Team Forrest Finale

UFC 85: Bedlam was a mixed martial arts event held by the Ultimate Fighting Championship (UFC) on June 7, 2008, at The O_{2} Arena in London, United Kingdom.

== Background ==
The card was plagued by a number of injuries sustained by scheduled fighters, forcing the UFC to rework the card several times. Originally, the main event was to be between light heavyweights Chuck Liddell and Mauricio Rua; however, Rua required surgery on an injured knee and could not compete. Rashad Evans then replaced Rua in the main event with Liddell, but Liddell was forced to withdraw from the card due to a hamstring injury. The UFC then named James Irvin as Liddell's replacement to fight Evans, but Irvin sustained a foot injury that forced him to pull out. Evans was then removed from the card as well.

The main event was ultimately changed to Matt Hughes against Thiago Alves. Hughes took the fight on short notice as a favor to the UFC and Alves came in four pounds overweight.

In other changes, a Jonathan Goulet and Paul Kelly match was cancelled when Goulet dropped out citing a lack of training time, followed by Kelly withdrawing before his opponent could be named because of an injury sustained in practice.

Due to legal problems which resulted in a lack of time to prepare for his fight with Michael Bisping, Chris Leben was forced to withdraw from the card and the UFC announced Jason Day would face Bisping.

Ryo Chonan was replaced by Kevin Burns, and Neil Wain was replaced by Eddie Sanchez.

== Results ==
Main card (PPV)
Weight class				Method	Round	Time	Notes
Catchweight (174 lb)	Thiago Alves	def.	Matt Hughes	TKO (flying knee and punches)	2	1:02
Middleweight	Michael Bisping	def.	Jason Day	TKO (punches)	1	3:42
Welterweight	Mike Swick	def.	Marcus Davis	Decision (unanimous) (29–27, 29–27, 29–27)	3	5:00	(Note: Swick had 1 point deducted in round 3 for holding the cage.)
Middleweight	Thales Leites	def.	Nate Marquardt	Decision (split) (28–27, 27–28, 28–27)	3	5:00	(Note: Marquardt had 2 points deducted during the fight, one in round 2 (illegal knee to the head of a downed opponent) and the other in round 3 (elbow to the back of the head).)
Heavyweight	Fabrício Werdum	def.	Brandon Vera	TKO (punches)	1	4:40
Preliminary card
Middleweight	Martin Kampmann	def.	Jorge Rivera	Submission (guillotine choke)	1	2:44
Lightweight	Matt Wiman	def.	Thiago Tavares	KO (punches)	2	1:57
Welterweight	Kevin Burns	def.	Roan Carneiro	Submission (triangle choke)	2	2:53
Light Heavyweight	Luiz Cane	def.	Jason Lambert	TKO (punches)	1	2:07
Welterweight	Paul Taylor	def.	Jess Liaudin	Decision (split) (28–29, 29–28, 29–28)	3	5:00
Heavyweight	Antoni Hardonk	def.	Eddie Sanchez	TKO (punches)	2	4:15

== Bonus awards ==
The following fighters received $50,000 bonuses.

- Fight of the Night: Matt Wiman vs. Thiago Tavares
- Knockout of the Night: Thiago Alves
- Submission of the Night: Kevin Burns

== See also ==
- Ultimate Fighting Championship
- List of UFC champions
- List of UFC events
- 2008 in UFC
