= Kevin Burns (fighter) =

American mixed martial arts fighter

- Born: March 3, 1980 (age 46); Carroll, Iowa, United States
- Other names: The Fire
- Height: 6 ft 0 in (1.83 m)
- Weight: 170 lb (77 kg; 12 st)
- Division: Welterweight
- Reach: 74 in (190 cm)
- Fighting out of: Des Moines, Iowa, United States
- Team: Grudge Training Center
- Rank: Brown belt in Brazilian jiu-jitsu Black belt in Tae Kwon Do

Mixed martial arts record
- Total: 19
- Wins: 12
- By knockout: 3
- By submission: 8
- By decision: 1
- Losses: 7
- By knockout: 4
- By decision: 3

Other information
- Mixed martial arts record from Sherdog

Kevin Bertrand Burns (born March 3, 1980) is a former American mixed martial artist who previously competed in the Welterweight division. A professional competitor since 2006, he has formerly competed for the UFC.

== Background ==
Originally from Glidden, Iowa, Burns was a talented football player, competing at the collegiate level. Burns later began training in Tae Kwon Do at the age of 18, before transitioning into Brazilian jiu-jitsu, and then finally mixed martial arts.

== Mixed martial arts career ==
=== Early career ===
With only ten months of training, Burns made his amateur MMA debut, defeating Josh Neer. Burns took a year off after the win but returned when Neer called him out for a rematch. Burns took his first loss in the bout.

Four years later, Burns won his professional debut against Demi Deeds. He won his next fight before losing to Jason High. The loss did not slow down Burns, as he racked up three more wins. With the wins he earned a four-fight deal with the UFC.

=== Ultimate Fighting Championship ===
At UFC 85 Burns made his debut for the UFC, earning the upset win over Roan Carneiro. He submitted Roan in the second round and was awarded Submission of the Night.

During his fight with Anthony Johnson in UFC: Silva vs. Irvin, he repeatedly poked Johnson in the eyes, for which he received four separate warnings by the referee, Steve Mazzagatti. In the third round, Johnson fell to the ground writhing in pain after an exchange with Burns, and Mazzagatti called the fight to protect Johnson, who was clearly unable to defend himself. Only after seeing the replay from a different camera angle was it seen that the reason for Johnson falling to the ground was due to one of Burns's open handed jabs landing deep into his eye. After some confusion, Steve Mazzagatti stopped the bout. After the fight Johnson appealed the decision as being poked in the eye was a foul, but it was ultimately rejected due to lack of remedy. Burns has claimed that the eye-jabs were not intentional and due to a prior broken hand, which he states forced him to punch with a looser hand.

Johnson defeated Burns with a third-round knockout in their rematch at The Ultimate Fighter 8 Finale.

Burns was defeated by Chris Lytle via unanimous decision in a back and forth war at The Ultimate Fighter 9 Finale. The fight did prove to be positive as Burns was given an extra $25,000 for earning Fight of the Night.

Burns lost to T. J. Grant via first-round TKO at UFC 107. After losing three straight bouts, Burns was released from the UFC.

== Championships and accomplishments ==
=== Mixed Martial Arts ===
- Ultimate Fighting Championship
  - Fight of the Night (One time) vs. Chris Lytle
  - Submission of the Night (One time) vs. Roan Carneiro
  - UFC.com Awards
    - 2008: Ranked #9 Newcomer of the Year, Half-Year Awards: Biggest Upset of the 1HY vs. Roan Carneiro, Ranked #4 Upset of the Year vs. Roan Carneiro, Ranked #9 Submission of the Year vs. Roan Carneiro

== Mixed martial arts record ==
Professional record breakdown
19 matches	12 wins	7 losses
By knockout	3	4
By submission	8	0
By decision	1	3

Res.	Record	Opponent	Method	Event	Date	Round	Time	Location	Notes
Loss	12–7	James Wood	Decision (unanimous)	VFC 38: Roberts vs. Arocho	December 15, 2012	5	5:00	Ralston, Nebraska, United States	For the VFC Welterweight Championship.
Win	12–6	Mark Stoddard	Submission (shoulder choke)	MCC 43: High Octane	October 12, 2012	1	2:52	Des Moines, Iowa, United States	
Win	11–6	Mason Temiquel	Submission (rear-naked choke)	MCC 42: Lund vs. Schmauss	August 3, 2012	1	3:16	Des Moines, Iowa, United States	
Loss	10–6	Tom Speer	Decision (split)	Brutaal: Fight Night	May 11, 2012	3	5:00	Tama, Iowa, United States	
Win	10–5	Eddie Larrea	Submission (rear-naked choke)	MCC 37: Thanksgiving Throwdown	November 23, 2011	1	1:09	Des Moines, Iowa, United States	
Loss	9–5	Koffi Adzitso	KO (punches)	ZarMMA: Fight Night	November 12, 2010	1	1:54	Layton, Utah, United States	
Win	9–4	Kalel Robinson	Submission (arm-triangle choke)	MCC 28: Impact	August 6, 2010	1	3:18	Des Moines, Iowa, United States	
Win	8–4	Sean Huffman	Decision (unanimous)	MCC 25: Inferno	March 13, 2010	3	5:00	Des Moines, Iowa, United States	
Loss	7–4	T. J. Grant	TKO (punches)	UFC 107	December 12, 2009	1	4:57	Memphis, Tennessee, United States	
Loss	7–3	Chris Lytle	Decision (unanimous)	The Ultimate Fighter 9 Finale	June 20, 2009	3	5:00	Las Vegas, Nevada, United States	Fight of the Night.
Loss	7–2	Anthony Johnson	KO (head kick)	The Ultimate Fighter 8 Finale	December 13, 2008	3	0:28	Las Vegas, Nevada, United States	
Win	7–1	Anthony Johnson	TKO (eye poke)	UFC Fight Night: Silva vs. Irvin	July 19, 2008	3	3:35	Las Vegas, Nevada, United States	Johnson appealed for the result to be overturned which was rejected by NSAC.
Win	6–1	Roan Carneiro	Submission (triangle choke)	UFC 85	June 7, 2008	2	2:53	London, England	Submission of the Night.
Win	5–1	Bobby Voelker	KO (punch)	VFC 23: Validation	May 9, 2008	1	0:30	Council Bluffs, Iowa, United States	
Win	4–1	Steve Schneider	Submission (triangle choke)	GFC 2	December 15, 2007	2	4:13	Des Moines, Iowa, United States	
Win	3–1	Sean Westbrook	Submission (rear-naked choke)	GFC 1: Genesis	April 20, 2007	1	3:22	Des Moines, Iowa, United States	
Loss	2–1	Jason High	TKO (doctor stoppage)	VFC 18: Hitmen	February 16, 2007	2	5:00	Council Bluffs, Iowa, United States	
Win	2–0	Matt Delanoit	Submission (armbar)	VFC 17: Predators	December 9, 2006	1	3:29	Council Bluffs, Iowa, United States	
Win	1–0	Demi Deeds	TKO (punches)	Greensparks: Full Contact Fighting 1	August 19, 2006	1	3:58	Clive, Iowa, United States	
