= Eddie Sanchez =

American mixed martial arts fighter

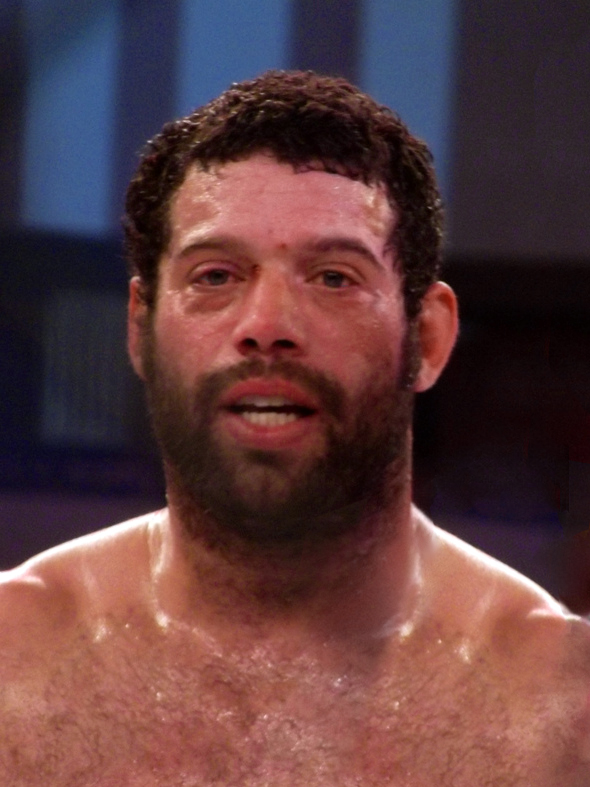
- Sanchez in a post fight interview
- Born: November 4, 1982 (age 43); La Jolla, California, U.S.
- Other names: The Manic Hispanic
- Height: 6 ft 3 in (191 cm)
- Weight: 214 lb (97 kg; 15 st 4 lb)
- Division: Heavyweight
- Reach: 79 in (201 cm)
- Fighting out of: San Diego, California, United States
- Team: Kings MMA
- Years active: 2004–2014

Mixed martial arts record
- Total: 23
- Wins: 15
- By knockout: 10
- By submission: 3
- By decision: 2
- Losses: 8
- By knockout: 5
- By submission: 1
- By decision: 2

Other information
- Mixed martial arts record from Sherdog

Eduardo Arturo Sanchez (born November 4, 1982) is an American retired professional mixed martial artist who last competed in the Heavyweight division. A professional from 2004 to 2014, he competed for the UFC, Bellator, Titan FC, Final Fight Championship, and King of the Cage.

== Background ==
Sanchez played baseball at San Marcos High School, excelling as a pitcher, and then continued at his career at Palomar College. However, his career was cut short when he was injured after a near fatal drunk driving incident. Sanchez was 20 years old and driving with a friend while intoxicated. Sanchez flew through the windshield and almost had one of his legs amputated because of the injuries.

== Mixed martial arts career ==
=== Ultimate Fighting Championship ===
On February 3, 2007, with a 1–0 promotional record, Sanchez faced Mirko Cro Cop at UFC 67. Sanchez lost via TKO due to punches at 4:33 of the first round, in Cro Cop's debut fight in the UFC. Average betting for this fight was around -1200 for Cro Cop and +800 for Eddie Sanchez, the biggest gap for underdog/favorite in UFC history.

Sanchez defeated Irish heavyweight Colin Robinson by TKO at UFC 72.

At UFC 79, held on December 29, 2007, Sanchez defeated Soa Palalei via TKO (strikes). Sanchez went on to lose to Antoni Hardonk at UFC 85 in London on June 7, 2008. Sanchez took the Hardonk fight on short notice, as a late replacement for Neil Wain. Sanchez was noticeably out of shape at the weigh in, but despite this, he knocked Hardonk down twice, once in the first round and once in the second, before succumbing to strikes at 4:15 in the second round. Sanchez next faced Justin McCully at UFC: Fight for the Troops on December 10, 2008, he lost the via unanimous decision and was released from the promotion.

=== Bellator Fighting Championships ===
Sanchez debuted for Bellator at Bellator 7, recording a ten-second knock out.

His next Bellator bout was scheduled against Ralph Kelly at Bellator 20. Kelly pulled out of the bout and was replaced by Wayne Cole. Cole then pulled out of the fight and was replaced by Marcus Sursa. Sanchez won via TKO in the third round. With this win, Eddie will take a spot in the third season heavyweight tournament.

=== Titan Fighting Championships ===
Sanchez was scheduled to fight Bobby Lashley at Titan Fighting Championships 19. But on July 22, it was announced that Lashley withdrew from the fight for personal reasons.

Sanchez fought Strikeforce veteran Brett Rogers at Titan Fighting Championships 20. Sanchez won by split decision.

=== Independent promotions ===
Sanchez then faced Damian Grabowski at MMA Attack 2 on April 27, 2012. Sanchez was submitted via kimura at 2:02 in the second round.

The following June, Sanchez faced future Bellator Heavyweight champion Vitaly Minakov at The Battle of Moscow 7. Sanchez was defeated in the first round via KO.

After a long layoff, Sanchez eventually returned and faced Stjepan Bekavac at FFC11: Jurković vs. Kaluđerović on April 4, 2014. Sanchez was knocked out in the first round, marking his third loss in a row.

== Championships and accomplishments ==
- Ultimate Fighting Championship
  - Knockout of the Night (One time) vs. Soa Palelei

== Mixed martial arts record ==
Professional record breakdown
23 matches	15 wins	8 losses
By knockout	10	5
By submission	3	1
By decision	2	2

Res.	Record	Opponent	Method	Event	Date	Round	Time	Location	Notes
Loss	15–8	Stjepan Bekavac	KO (punch)	FFC11: Jurkovic vs. Kaluderovic	April 4, 2014	1	1:07	Osijek, Croatia	
Loss	15–7	Vitaly Minakov	KO (punch)	Fight Nights Global 9	June 7, 2012	1	1:59	Moscow, Russia	
Loss	15–6	Damian Grabowski	Submission (kimura)	MMA Attack 2	April 27, 2012	2	2:02	Katowice, Poland	
Win	15–5	Brett Rogers	Decision (split)	Titan Fighting Championships 20	September 23, 2011	3	5:00	Kansas City, Kansas, United States	
Loss	14–5	Mike Whitehead	Decision (split)	Pure Fighting Championships 6	December 10, 2010	3	5:00	Red Deer, Alberta, Canada	
Loss	14–4	Neil Grove	TKO (punches)	Bellator 24	August 12, 2010	1	1:32	Hollywood, Florida, United States	Bellator Season 3 Heavyweight Tournament Quarterfinal.
Win	14–3	Marcus Sursa	TKO (punches)	Bellator 20	May 27, 2010	3	0:23	San Antonio, Texas, United States	
Win	13–3	Mark Honneger	Decision (unanimous)	Maximo Fighting Championship	October 17, 2009	3	5:00	San Juan, Puerto Rico	
Win	12–3	Vince Lucero	Submission (guillotine choke)	Total Combat 33	July 11, 2009	1	0:27	Mexico City, Mexico	
Win	11–3	Jay White	KO (punches)	Bellator 7	May 15, 2009	1	0:10	Chicago, Illinois, United States	
Loss	10–3	Justin McCully	Decision (unanimous)	UFC: Fight for the Troops	December 10, 2008	3	5:00	Fayetteville, North Carolina, United States	
Loss	10–2	Antoni Hardonk	TKO (punches)	UFC 85	June 7, 2008	2	4:15	London, England	
Win	10–1	Soa Palelei	TKO (punches)	UFC 79	December 29, 2007	3	3:24	Las Vegas, Nevada, United States	Knockout of the Night.
Win	9–1	Colin Robinson	TKO (punches)	UFC 72	June 16, 2007	2	0:32	Belfast, Northern Ireland	
Loss	8–1	Mirko Cro Cop	TKO (punches)	UFC 67	February 3, 2007	1	4:33	Las Vegas, Nevada, United States	
Win	8–0	Mario Neto	KO (punches)	UFC 63: Hughes vs. Penn	September 23, 2006	2	0:17	Anaheim, California, United States	
Win	7–0	Wade Shipp	TKO (punches)	TC 13: Anarchy	March 11, 2006	3	4:32	Del Mar, California, United States	
Win	6–0	Josh Tamsen	TKO (punches)	Total Combat 11	December 17, 2005	1	N/A	Tijuana, Mexico	
Win	5–0	Julian Rush	TKO (corner stoppage)	Total Combat 10	October 15, 2005	1	5:00	San Diego, California, United States	
Win	4–0	Adrian Perez	TKO (submission to punches)	KOTC 61: Flash Point	September 23, 2005	1	0:11	San Jacinto, California, United States	
Win	3–0	Anthony Ruiz	Technical Submission (triangle choke)	KOTC 54: Mucho Machismo	June 12, 2005	1	2:49	San Jacinto, California, United States	
Win	2–0	Tony Towers	TKO (punches)	Total Combat 7	January 29, 2005	1	1:55	Tijuana, Mexico	
Win	1–0	Adan Arceo	TKO (punches)	Total Combat 5	April 21, 2004	2	0:20	Tijuana, Mexico	
