= UFC 88 =

UFC mixed martial arts event in 2008

UFC 88: Breakthrough
- The poster for UFC 88: Breakthrough
- Promotion: Ultimate Fighting Championship
- Date: September 6, 2008
- Venue: Philips Arena
- City: Atlanta, Georgia
- Attendance: 14,736
- Total gate: $2,600,000
- Buyrate: 480,000

Event chronology
UFC 87: Seek and Destroy	UFC 88: Breakthrough	UFC Fight Night: Diaz vs. Neer

UFC 88: Breakthrough was a mixed martial arts event held by the Ultimate Fighting Championship (UFC) on September 6, 2008, at Philips Arena in Atlanta, Georgia. The event was headlined by a light heavyweight bout between Chuck Liddell and Rashad Evans.

== Results ==
Main card (PPV)
Weight class				Method	Round	Time	Notes
Light Heavyweight	Rashad Evans	def.	Chuck Liddell	KO (punch)	2	1:51
Light Heavyweight	Rich Franklin	def.	Matt Hamill	TKO (body kick and punches)	3	0:39
Middleweight	Dan Henderson	def.	Rousimar Palhares	Decision (unanimous) (30–27, 30–27, 29–28)	3	5:00
Middleweight	Nate Marquardt	def.	Martin Kampmann	TKO (punches)	1	1:22
Welterweight	Dong Hyun Kim	def.	Matt Brown	Decision (split) (29–28, 28–29, 29–28)	3	5:00
Preliminary card
Lightweight	Kurt Pellegrino	def.	Thiago Tavares	Decision (unanimous) (29–27, 29–27, 29–28)	3	5:00
Light Heavyweight	Tim Boetsch	def.	Michael Patt	TKO (punches)	1	2:03
Middleweight	Jason MacDonald	def.	Jason Lambert	Submission (rear-naked choke)	2	1:20
Welterweight	Ryo Chonan	def.	Roan Carneiro	Decision (split) (29–28, 28–29, 29–28)	3	5:00

== Bonus awards ==
The following fighters received $60,000 bonuses.

- Fight of the Night: Kurt Pellegrino vs. Thiago Tavares
- Knockout of the Night: Rashad Evans
- Submission of the Night: Jason MacDonald

== See also ==
- Ultimate Fighting Championship
- List of UFC champions
- List of UFC events
- 2008 in UFC
