= Paul Sass =

English martial artist (born 1988)

- Born: 4 August 1988 (age 38); Liverpool, England
- Other names: Sassangle
- Nationality: English
- Height: 6 ft 0 in (1.83 m)
- Weight: 155.1 lb (70.4 kg; 11.08 st)
- Division: Lightweight
- Reach: 73.0 in (185 cm)
- Stance: Orthodox
- Fighting out of: Liverpool, England
- Team: Team Kaobon
- Rank: Purple belt in Luta Livre; Brown belt in Brazilian Jiu-Jitsu

Mixed martial arts record
- Total: 16
- Wins: 14
- By submission: 13
- By decision: 1
- Losses: 2
- By submission: 1
- By decision: 1

Other information
- Mixed martial arts record from Sherdog
- Last updated on: 21 September 2011

Paul Sass (born 4 August 1988) is a retired English mixed martial artist who competed in UFC's and Bellator's Lightweight division.

== Mixed martial arts career ==
=== Early career ===
Sass' professional record stands at 14–2 with eight of the victories by triangle choke and one by triangle armbar. These nine triangle victories have earned him a world submission record. His penultimate fight on the domestic circuit was against Rob Sinclair, the current British Lightweight Champion. Sass defeated Sinclair by split decision.

=== Ultimate Fighting Championship ===
Sass signed a four-fight deal with the UFC, joining Kurt Warburton, Tom Blackledge and Rob Broughton as the new additions to the UFC roster.

In his UFC debut at UFC 120 he submitted Canadian Mark Holst in the first round with a Triangle Choke. Sass picked up Submission of the Night honors and a $60,000 bonus following the event.

Sass faced Michael Johnson on 1 October 2011 at UFC on Versus 6. Sass defeated Johnson in the first round via heel hook submission.

Sass was expected to face Evan Dunham on 28 January 2012 at UFC on Fox 2. However, Sass was forced from the bout with an injury and replaced by Nik Lentz.

Sass defeated Jacob Volkmann on 26 May 2012 at UFC 146 via submission (triangle armbar).

Sass faced off against Matt Wiman on 26 September 2012 at UFC on Fuel TV: Struve vs. Miocic. Wiman defeated Sass via first round submission (armbar).

Sass fought Danny Castillo on 16 February 2013 at UFC on Fuel TV: Barão vs. McDonald. Sass lost the fight via unanimous decision and was subsequently released from the promotion.

=== Bellator MMA ===
Sass signed with Bellator in May and made his debut at Bellator 104 in the autumn of 2013. He faced Rod Montoya in a lightweight contest and won via submission in the first round.

== Championships and accomplishments ==
=== Grappling ===
- Winner of Ground Control Grappling Tournament (Absolute Division)
- Winner of Ren Bu Kai Grappling Tournament (Under 75k)

=== Mixed martial arts ===
- OMMAC Lightweight Champion
- Runner Up – UK Rising Star (Cage Warriors 08 Awards)
- Ultimate Fighting Championship
  - Submission of the Night (Two times)

== Mixed martial arts record ==
Professional record breakdown
16 matches	14 wins	2 losses
By submission	13	1
By decision	1	1

Res.	Record	Opponent	Method	Event	Date	Round	Time	Location	Notes
Win	14–2	Rod Montoya	Submission (toe hold)	Bellator 104	18 October 2013	1	2:01	Cedar Rapids, Iowa, US	
Loss	13–2	Danny Castillo	Decision (unanimous)	UFC on Fuel TV: Barão vs. McDonald	16 February 2013	3	5:00	London, England, UK	
Loss	13–1	Matt Wiman	Submission (armbar)	UFC on Fuel TV: Struve vs. Miocic	29 September 2012	1	3:48	Nottingham, England, UK	
Win	13–0	Jacob Volkmann	Submission (triangle armbar)	UFC 146	26 May 2012	1	1:54	Las Vegas, Nevada, US	Submission of the Night.
Win	12–0	Michael Johnson	Submission (inverted heel hook)	UFC Live: Cruz vs. Johnson	1 October 2011	1	3:00	Washington, D.C., US	
Win	11–0	Mark Holst	Submission (triangle choke)	UFC 120	16 October 2010	1	4:45	London, England, UK	Submission of the Night.
Win	10–0	Jason Young	Submission (heel hook)	OMMAC 4: Victorious	6 March 2010	1	2:01	Liverpool, England, UK	Defended OMMAC Lightweight Championship.
Win	9–0	Rob Sinclair	Decision (split)	OMMAC 2: Business As Usual	3 October 2009	3	5:00	Liverpool, England, UK	Won OMMAC Lightweight Championship.
Win	8–0	Ian Jones	Submission (heel hook)	OMMAC 1: Assassins	8 August 2009	1	0:32	Liverpool, England, UK	
Win	7–0	Harvey Harra	Submission (triangle choke)	CG 11: Resurrection	7 March 2009	1	2:15	Liverpool, England, UK	
Win	6–0	Jason Ball	Submission (triangle choke)	CG 10: Clash of the Titans	29 November 2008	2	1:26	Liverpool, England, UK	
Win	5–0	Andrew Fisher	Submission (triangle choke)	CG 9: Beatdown	4 October 2008	1	3:37	Liverpool, England, UK	
Win	4–0	Martin Stapleton	Submission (triangle choke)	Cage Gladiators 8	27 July 2008	1	3:18	Liverpool, England, UK	
Win	3–0	Will Burke	Submission (triangle choke)	Cage Gladiators 7	28 April 2008	1	1:04	Liverpool, England, UK	
Win	2–0	Steve Warris	Submission (triangle choke)	Cage Gladiators 5	4 November 2007	1	2:31	Liverpool, England, UK	
Win	1–0	David Johnson	Submission (triangle choke)	Cage Gladiators 4	5 August 2007	1	1:14	Liverpool, England, UK	
