= UFC Fight Night: Swick vs. Burkman =

Mixed martial arts event in 2008

- The poster for UFC Fight Night: Swick vs. Burkman
- Promotion: Ultimate Fighting Championship
- Date: January 23, 2008
- Venue: Palms Casino Resort
- City: Las Vegas, Nevada

Event chronology
| UFC 80: Rapid Fire | UFC Fight Night: Swick vs. Burkman | UFC 81: Breaking Point |

UFC Fight Night: Swick vs. Burkman (also known as UFC Fight Night 12) was a mixed martial arts (MMA) event held by the Ultimate Fighting Championship (UFC) on January 23, 2008, at the Palms Casino Resort in Las Vegas, Nevada.

== Background ==
The main event featured former The Ultimate Fighter contestants Mike Swick and Josh Burkman in a welterweight matchup. This event was Swick's debut at welterweight, as he had been competing at middleweight prior to the show.

== Results ==
Main card (Spike TV)
| Weight class | | | | Method | Round | Time | Notes |
|---|---|---|---|---|---|---|---|
| Welterweight | Mike Swick | def. | Josh Burkman | Decision (majority) (29–28, 29–28, 29–29) | 3 | 5:00 |
| Middleweight | Patrick Côté | def. | Drew McFedries | TKO (punches) | 1 | 1:44 |
| Lightweight | Thiago Tavares | def. | Michihiro Omigawa | Decision (unanimous) (30–27, 29–28, 30–27) | 3 | 5:00 |
| Lightweight | Nate Diaz | def. | Alvin Robinson | Submission (triangle choke) | 1 | 3:39 |
Preliminary card
| Lightweight | Kurt Pellegrino | def. | Alberto Crane | TKO (punches) | 2 | 1:55 | (Note: This preliminary bout was aired on the broadcast following the Cote vs McFedries bout.) |
| Lightweight | Gray Maynard | def. | Dennis Siver | Decision (unanimous) (29–28, 30–27, 29–28) | 3 | 5:00 |
| Lightweight | Jeremy Stephens | def. | Cole Miller | TKO (punches and elbows) | 2 | 4:44 |
| Lightweight | Corey Hill | def. | Joe Veres | TKO (punches) | 2 | 0:37 |
| Lightweight | Matt Wiman | def. | Justin Buchholz | Submission (rear-naked choke) | 1 | 2:56 |

== Bonus awards ==
The following fighters received $40,000 bonuses.

- Fight of the Night: Gray Maynard vs. Dennis Siver
- Knockout of the Night: Patrick Côté
- Submission of the Night: Nate Diaz

== See also ==
- Ultimate Fighting Championship
- List of UFC champions
- List of UFC events
- 2008 in UFC
