= Josh Koscheck =

American mixed martial arts fighter (born 1977)

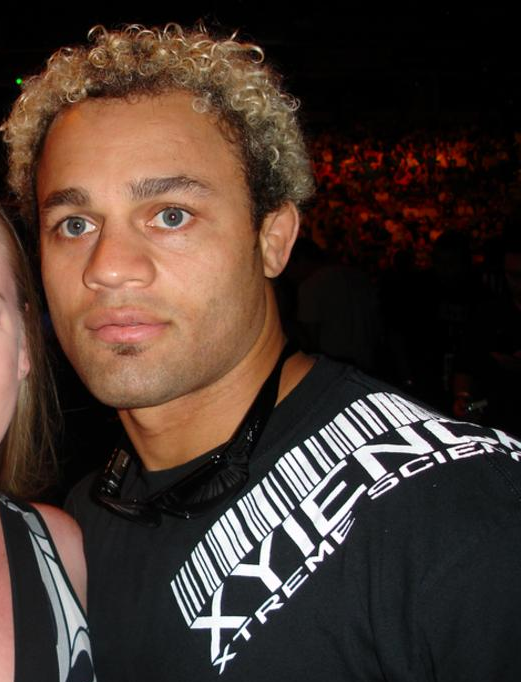
- Born: November 30, 1977 (age 48); Waynesburg, Pennsylvania, U.S.
- Other names: Kos
- Height: 5 ft 10 in (1.78 m)
- Weight: 170 lb (77 kg; 12 st 2 lb)
- Division: Middleweight; Welterweight
- Reach: 73 in (185 cm)
- Stance: Orthodox
- Fighting out of: Fresno, California, United States
- Team: Dethrone Base Camp; AKA (formerly)
- Rank: Black Belt in Brazilian Jiu-Jitsu
- Wrestling: NCAA Division I Wrestling
- Years active: 2004–2018

Mixed martial arts record
- Total: 28
- Wins: 17
- By knockout: 6
- By submission: 4
- By decision: 7
- Losses: 11
- By knockout: 4
- By submission: 3
- By decision: 4

Other information
- University: Edinboro University of Pennsylvania
- Notable school: Waynesburg Central High School
- Mixed martial arts record from Sherdog
Medal record
Collegiate Wrestling
Representing the Edinboro Fighting Scots
NCAA Division I Championships
Gold medal – first place	2001 Iowa City	174 lb
Silver medal – second place	2000 St. Louis	174 lb
Bronze medal – third place	2002 Albany	174 lb

Josh Koscheck (born November 30, 1977) is an American retired mixed martial artist who fought in the Welterweight division of the Ultimate Fighting Championship (UFC) and Bellator MMA. Koscheck made his debut with the UFC on the first season of the reality television show The Ultimate Fighter as a middleweight, and had since fought for the company 25 times from 2005–2015, compiling a UFC record of 15–10 and having contended for the UFC Welterweight Championship once.

== Mixed martial arts career ==
=== Ultimate Fighting Championship ===
Prior to his MMA career, Koscheck was an accomplished wrestler at Waynesburg Central High School, graduating in 1997. He attended Edinboro University, where he won the 174-pound national championship in 2001 as a senior, and was a four-time NCAA Division 1 All-American collegiate wrestler.

Koscheck appeared on the first season of The Ultimate Fighter as a middleweight fighter. He defeated Chris Leben via unanimous decision to advance to the semifinals, where he was defeated by Diego Sanchez via split decision. Koscheck had his first official UFC fight on April 9, 2005, at The Ultimate Finale, where he defeated Chris Sanford with a first-round KO. Koscheck followed this victory with another win at UFC Ultimate Fight Night over Pete Spratt in Koscheck's debut at welterweight. Since then, Koscheck has amassed an additional three victories after experiencing his first career loss to Drew Fickett due to a rear naked choke. Koscheck then defeated Jonathan Goulet at UFC Fight Night 6 by submission due to strikes.

In 2006, Koscheck began training at the American Kickboxing Academy (AKA) in San Jose, California, to which he accredits his vastly improved kickboxing technique.

Koscheck's fight on December 13, 2006 was against Brazilian Jiu-Jitsu black belt Jeff Joslin at UFC Fight Night 7 where he won by unanimous decision.

Koscheck was then scheduled to fight Diego Sanchez on April 7, 2007 at UFC 69. This was the second encounter between the two Ultimate Fighter 1 alumni, now fighting as welterweights. The first fight – which did not count towards Koscheck's official record due to the bout being considered an exhibition match for The Ultimate Fighter television taping – resulted in a split decision win for Sanchez. At the weigh-ins for the event, Sanchez shoved Koscheck during the traditional post-weigh-in staredown. Although Sanchez continued to shout at Koscheck, no conflict ensued. In their fight, Koscheck defeated Sanchez by unanimous decision (30-27, 30-27, 30-27). Koscheck outstruck Sanchez throughout all three rounds and only shot in for a takedown once. During his post-fight interview, Koscheck repeatedly exclaimed, "Nineteen-and-one," in reference to Sanchez' first mixed martial arts defeat (including the two fights from The Ultimate Fighter show). UFC President Dana White announced a few weeks after the fight that Diego Sanchez had an undiagnosed illness before and during the fight which turned out to be a serious staph infection.

On August 25, 2007, Koscheck was defeated by Georges St-Pierre at UFC 74 via unanimous decision (30–27, 29–28, 29–28). St-Pierre's wrestling skills were displayed during the match by outwrestling Koscheck, scoring takedowns, stuffing Koscheck's takedown attempts and maintaining top position throughout most of the fight. There was speculation before the fight that Koscheck would outmatch St-Pierre on the ground due to his credentials, but St-Pierre was confident that he was a better wrestler and striker and was more well-versed in submissions than Koscheck.

Koscheck would rebound with a second round TKO victory over Dustin Hazelett at UFC 82.

Koscheck then faced Chris Lytle at UFC 86, winning by unanimous decision after repeatedly taking Lytle down and cutting him badly with "ground and pound" elbows.

Koscheck then agreed to step in and fight Thiago Alves at UFC 90 on just 2 weeks notice due to an injury suffered by Diego Sanchez. Koscheck lost the fight via unanimous decision. Alves landed powerful leg kicks and managed to drop Koscheck more than once during the fight.

On December 10, 2008, Koscheck fought Yoshiyuki Yoshida in the main event at UFC: Fight for the Troops and won by KO in the first round by landing two devastating straight right punches to Yoshida's head. The Japanese fighter remained on the canvas, while being tended to by commission doctors and was removed from the Octagon on a stretcher as a precautionary measure. He was later treated and released from a local hospital for a concussion. Koscheck received $30,000 bonus from the UFC for Knockout of the Night.

Koscheck fought promotional newcomer Paulo Thiago at UFC 95. Koscheck was defeated by the debuting Brazilian via first-round KO. Thiago hit Koscheck squarely with a right uppercut and landed a left hook as Koscheck fell to the canvas in a stupor. After the bout was halted, Koscheck got up and argued that he was still alert and able to defend himself. Shortly after the stoppage, Koscheck was seen calmly offering his opinion of the stoppage to the referee: "Too early - just a little bit too early."

Koscheck was to fight Chris Wilson at UFC 98 but was forced to withdraw after suffering a foot injury in training. He returned at UFC 103 and defeated returning veteran Frank Trigg via TKO (punches) in the 1st round.

Koscheck was expected to face Mike Pierce on January 11, 2010, at UFC Fight Night 20, but instead went on to face Anthony Johnson on November 21, 2009, at UFC 106.

On November 21, 2009 at UFC 106, Koscheck defeated Anthony Johnson by rear naked choke at 4:47 in the 2nd round. In the first round, Koscheck blocked a knee aimed at his head while he had two knees on the ground. Koscheck went to the ground holding his face, prompting the referee to step in and deduct a point from Johnson. Commentators accused Koscheck of faking the impact of the knee, which seemed to miss Koscheck's face on the replays. Koscheck has said in multiple interviews that he was reacting to an eye poke, not the knee. In round two, Koscheck poked Johnson in the eye twice leading to Johnson being given time to recover. Because of this, many fans think due to the controversy in both rounds between the fighters, it should've been declared a No Contest. In his post fight interview, he called out Dan Hardy, the #1 contender in the Welterweight Division. This fight earned him two $75,000 awards for Fight of the Night and Submission of the Night totaling $140,000.

Koscheck was scheduled to rematch Paulo Thiago at UFC 109, but was forced off the card with an injury and was replaced by AKA teammate Mike Swick.

==== Welterweight contendership ====
Koscheck was signed to fight Paul Daley at UFC 113, which he won by unanimous decision. The fight however, was not without controversy as similar to his fight with Anthony Johnson, Koscheck faked being hit with an illegal knee, resulting in a point deduction for Daley. After the final bell, Daley walked up to Koscheck and delivered a sucker punch to Koscheck, resulting in him being restrained by the referee. In an interview at the conclusion of the event, Dana White announced that Daley would never fight in the UFC again. White was quoted as saying, "He will never come back, I do not care if he's the best 170-pounder in the world. He's never coming back here. There's no excuse for that. You never hit a guy like that after the bell." Via Twitter, Koscheck expressed a desire to face Tito Ortiz at a catchweight after his fight with Daley, in large part because Ortiz poked fun at Mark Coleman after he was defeated at UFC 109.

In 2010, Koscheck was a coach on The Ultimate Fighter season 12. The season 12 finale aired on December 4, 2010 with the main event consisting of two fighters (Michael Johnson and Jonathan Brookins) from team Georges St-Pierre.

Koscheck faced Georges St-Pierre in a rematch at UFC 124 for the UFC Welterweight Championship. UFC 124 was heavily hyped due to Josh's well known animosity towards St-Pierre, stemming from his loss by decision in their fight at UFC 74. St Pierre utilized his left jab effectively in the bout, winning all rounds to defeat Koscheck 50-45 by unanimous decision. This fight earned him a $100,000 Fight of the Night award.

Koscheck suffered a broken orbital bone on the right side of his face during the fight with St-Pierre. Since he was unable to fly due to air pockets which formed around his right eye, the UFC arranged for Koscheck and his trainer to drive to Boston, where Koscheck received corrective surgery.

==== Post-title shot ====
Koscheck defeated former UFC welterweight champion Matt Hughes on September 24, 2011 at UFC 135 via KO in the first round, replacing an injured Diego Sanchez. This fight earned him a $75,000 Knockout of the Night award.

Koscheck was expected to face Carlos Condit on February 4, 2012 at UFC 143. However, on December 7, 2011, it was revealed Georges St-Pierre had sustained ACL injury to his left knee and the injury would sideline him for around ten months, forcing him out of his scheduled bout with Nick Diaz. Condit and Diaz faced each other at the event with the winner crowned interim UFC Welterweight Champion, while Koscheck faced Mike Pierce at the event. He won the fight via split decision.

Koscheck then faced Johny Hendricks on May 5, 2012 at UFC on Fox 3. He lost the fight via split decision.

Koscheck was expected to face Jake Ellenberger on September 1, 2012 at UFC 151. However, Koscheck pulled out of the bout citing a back injury.

Koscheck faced returning veteran Robbie Lawler on February 23, 2013 at UFC 157. Despite being able to take down Lawler several times during the fight, Koscheck lost by TKO after being rocked by a knee to the head while shooting for a takedown, then finished with punches on the ground by Lawler at 3:57 on the 1st round.

Koscheck was expected to face Demian Maia on August 3, 2013 at UFC 163. However, Koscheck was forced out of the bout with an injury and as a result, Maia was pulled from the card as well.

Koscheck next faced Tyron Woodley at UFC 167 on November 16, 2013. He lost the fight via knockout in the first round.

Koscheck was briefly linked to a bout with Neil Magny at UFC 184 on February 28, 2015. However, the pairing was cancelled and Koscheck instead faced Jake Ellenberger at the event. Koscheck lost the fight via submission in the second round.

Just 21 days after his loss to Ellenberger, Koscheck replaced an injured Ben Saunders to face Erick Silva on March 21, 2015 at UFC Fight Night 62. Koscheck lost the fight by submission in the first round.

=== Bellator MMA ===
On June 26, 2015, it was announced that Koscheck signed a multi-year deal with Bellator MMA. Koscheck was set to make his debut against fellow welterweight Matthew Secor on January 29, 2016 in his home town of Fresno, California and was set to also be the main event.

It was announced on January 31, 2017, that Koscheck's previously delayed Bellator debut would take place at Bellator 172 on February 18, 2017 against Mauricio Alonso. He lost the fight via TKO in the first round.

Koscheck officially announced his retirement from MMA on June 28, 2018.

== Personal life ==
Koscheck attended and graduated from Edinboro University with a bachelor's degree in criminal justice, becoming the first member of his family to obtain a college degree.

Koscheck has been married to Tiaira Nowlin, a realty agent, since 2017.

== Championships and accomplishments ==
=== Amateur wrestling ===
- National Collegiate Athletic Association
  - NCAA Division I All-American out of Edinboro University (1999, 2000, 2001, 2002)
  - NCAA Division I 174 lb Fourth Place out of Edinboro University (1999)
  - NCAA Division I 174 lb National Runner-Up out of Edinboro University (2000)
  - NCAA Division I 174 lb National Champion out of Edinboro University (2001)
  - NCAA Division I 174 lb Third Place out of Edinboro University (2002)
- Pennsylvania Interscholastic Athletic Association
  - Pennsylvania AA 160 lb State Runner-Up out of Waynesburg Central High School (1997)

=== Mixed martial arts ===
- Ultimate Fighting Championship
  - Knockout of the Night (Two times) vs. Yoshiyuki Yoshida and Matt Hughes
  - Submission of the Night (One time) vs. Anthony Johnson
  - Fight of the Night (Two times) vs. Anthony Johnson and Georges St-Pierre 2
  - UFC Encyclopedia Awards
    - Knockout of the Night (One time) vs. Chris Sanford
    - Submission of the Night (Two times) vs. Pete Spratt and Ansar Chalangov
  - Tied (Vicente Luque) for fifth most bouts in UFC Welterweight division history (24)
  - Tied (Li Jingliang) for sixth most finishes in UFC Welterweight division history (8)
  - UFC.com Awards
    - 2007: Ranked #10 Upset of the Year vs. Diego Sanchez (Tied with Yushin Okami)
    - 2008: Ranked #8 Knockout of the Year vs. Yoshiyuki Yoshida
- MMA Fighting
  - 2008 #6 Ranked UFC Knockout of the Year vs. Yoshiyuki Yoshida at UFC: Fight for the Troops

== Mixed martial arts record ==
Professional record breakdown
28 matches	17 wins	11 losses
By knockout	6	4
By submission	4	3
By decision	7	4

Res.	Record	Opponent	Method	Event	Date	Round	Time	Location	Notes
Loss	17–11	Mauricio Alonso	TKO (punches)	Bellator 172	February 18, 2017	1	4:42	San Jose, California, United States	
Loss	17–10	Erick Silva	Submission (guillotine choke)	UFC Fight Night: Maia vs. LaFlare	March 21, 2015	1	4:21	Rio de Janeiro, Brazil	
Loss	17–9	Jake Ellenberger	Submission (north-south choke)	UFC 184	February 28, 2015	2	4:20	Los Angeles, California, United States	
Loss	17–8	Tyron Woodley	KO (punches)	UFC 167	November 16, 2013	1	4:38	Las Vegas, Nevada, United States	
Loss	17–7	Robbie Lawler	TKO (punches)	UFC 157	February 23, 2013	1	3:57	Anaheim, California, United States	
Loss	17–6	Johny Hendricks	Decision (split)	UFC on Fox: Diaz vs. Miller	May 5, 2012	3	5:00	East Rutherford, New Jersey, United States	
Win	17–5	Mike Pierce	Decision (split)	UFC 143	February 4, 2012	3	5:00	Las Vegas, Nevada, United States	
Win	16–5	Matt Hughes	KO (punches)	UFC 135	September 24, 2011	1	4:59	Denver, Colorado, United States	Knockout of the Night.
Loss	15–5	Georges St-Pierre	Decision (unanimous)	UFC 124	December 11, 2010	5	5:00	Montreal, Quebec, Canada	For the UFC Welterweight Championship. Fight of the Night.
Win	15–4	Paul Daley	Decision (unanimous)	UFC 113	May 8, 2010	3	5:00	Montreal, Quebec, Canada	UFC Welterweight title eliminator.
Win	14–4	Anthony Johnson	Submission (rear-naked choke)	UFC 106	November 21, 2009	2	4:47	Las Vegas, Nevada, United States	Submission of the Night. Fight of the Night.
Win	13–4	Frank Trigg	TKO (punches)	UFC 103	September 19, 2009	1	1:25	Dallas, Texas, United States	
Loss	12–4	Paulo Thiago	TKO (punches)	UFC 95	February 21, 2009	1	3:29	London, England	
Win	12–3	Yoshiyuki Yoshida	KO (punch)	UFC: Fight for the Troops	December 10, 2008	1	2:15	Fayetteville, North Carolina, United States	Knockout of the Night.
Loss	11–3	Thiago Alves	Decision (unanimous)	UFC 90	October 25, 2008	3	5:00	Rosemont, Illinois, United States	
Win	11–2	Chris Lytle	Decision (unanimous)	UFC 86	July 5, 2008	3	5:00	Las Vegas, Nevada, United States	
Win	10–2	Dustin Hazelett	TKO (head kick and punches)	UFC 82	March 1, 2008	2	1:24	Columbus, Ohio, United States	
Loss	9–2	Georges St-Pierre	Decision (unanimous)	UFC 74	August 25, 2007	3	5:00	Las Vegas, Nevada, United States	
Win	9–1	Diego Sanchez	Decision (unanimous)	UFC 69	April 7, 2007	3	5:00	Houston, Texas, United States	
Win	8–1	Jeff Joslin	Decision (unanimous)	UFC Fight Night: Sanchez vs. Riggs	December 13, 2006	3	5:00	San Diego, California, United States	
Win	7–1	Jonathan Goulet	TKO (submission to punches)	UFC Fight Night 6	August 17, 2006	1	4:10	Las Vegas, Nevada, United States	
Win	6–1	Dave Menne	Decision (unanimous)	UFC Fight Night 5	June 28, 2006	3	5:00	Las Vegas, Nevada, United States	
Win	5–1	Ansar Chalangov	Submission (rear-naked choke)	UFC Fight Night 4	April 6, 2006	1	3:29	Las Vegas, Nevada, United States	
Loss	4–1	Drew Fickett	Technical Submission (rear-naked choke)	UFC Ultimate Fight Night 2	October 3, 2005	3	4:28	Las Vegas, Nevada, United States	
Win	4–0	Pete Spratt	Submission (rear-naked choke)	UFC Ultimate Fight Night	August 6, 2005	1	1:53	Las Vegas, Nevada, United States	
Win	3–0	Chris Sanford	KO (punch)	The Ultimate Fighter 1 Finale	April 9, 2005	1	4:21	Las Vegas, Nevada, United States	Middleweight bout.
Win	2–0	Luke Cummo	Decision (unanimous)	Ring of Combat 6	April 24, 2004	3	5:00	Elizabeth, New Jersey, United States	
Win	1–0	Cruz Chacon	Submission (neck crank)	King of the Rockies	January 3, 2004	3	2:57	Fort Collins, Colorado, United States	

== See also ==
- List of current Bellator fighters
- List of male mixed martial artists
