= UFC: Fight for the Troops =

UFC mixed martial arts event in 2008

- The poster for UFC: Fight for the Troops
- Promotion: Ultimate Fighting Championship
- Date: December 10, 2008
- Venue: Cumberland County Crown Coliseum
- City: Fayetteville, North Carolina
- Attendance: 8,200

Event chronology
UFC 91: Couture vs. Lesnar	UFC: Fight for the Troops	The Ultimate Fighter: Team Nogueira vs. Team Mir Finale

UFC: Fight for the Troops (also known as UFC: Fight for the Troops 1 and UFC Fight Night 16) was a mixed martial arts event held by the Ultimate Fighting Championship (UFC) on December 10, 2008, at the Cumberland County Crown Coliseum in Fayetteville, North Carolina.

== Background ==
The event was the first of many the UFC held to support the military. It helped raise money for the Intrepid Fallen Heroes Fund, which provides support for severely wounded military personnel and veterans and the families of military personnel lost in service. The event reportedly raised $4 million during its three-hour broadcast.

The event was officially announced on September 17, 2008 during UFC Fight Night: Diaz vs. Neer.

Razak Al-Hassan replaced Brian Stann against Steve Cantwell on this card. Also, Jim Miller came in with only three weeks notice as a late replacement for Frankie Edgar against Matt Wiman.

The event resulted in an unusual number of serious injuries. Corey Hill, Razak Al-Hassan, Brandon Wolff, Jonathan Goulet, Nate Loughran, and Yoshiyuki Yoshida were all hospitalized for injuries sustained during their fights.

The referees assigned for the event were Dan Miragliotta, Donnie Jessup, Al Coley, and Mario Yamasaki.

== Results ==
Main card
Weight class				Method	Round	Time	Notes
Welterweight	Josh Koscheck	def.	Yoshiyuki Yoshida	KO (punch)	1	2:15
Welterweight	Mike Swick	def.	Jonathan Goulet	KO (punches)	1	0:33
Light Heavyweight	Steve Cantwell	def.	Razak Al-Hassan	Technical submission (armbar)	1	4:04
Middleweight	Tim Credeur	def.	Nate Loughran	TKO (rib injury)	2	5:00
Lightweight	Jim Miller	def.	Matt Wiman	Decision (unanimous) (30–27, 30–26, 30–27)	3	5:00
Preliminary card
Catchweight (173.5 lb)	Luigi Fioravanti	def.	Brodie Farber	Decision (unanimous) (30–27, 30–27, 30–27)	3	5:00	(Note: This bout was aired on the broadcast following the Cantwell vs Al-Hassan bout.)
Welterweight	Steve Bruno	def.	Johnny Rees	Submission (rear-naked choke)	2	3:44
Welterweight	Ben Saunders	def.	Brandon Wolff	TKO (knees)	1	1:49	(Note: This bout was aired on the broadcast following the Fioravanti vs Farber bout.)
Lightweight	Dale Hartt	def.	Corey Hill	TKO (leg injury)	2	0:20
Heavyweight	Justin McCully	def.	Eddie Sanchez	Decision (unanimous) (29–28, 30–27, 30–27)	3	5:00

== Bonus awards ==
The following fighters received $30,000 bonuses.

- Fight of the Night: Matt Wiman vs. Jim Miller
- Knockout of the Night: Josh Koscheck
- Submission of the Night: Steve Cantwell

== See also ==
- Ultimate Fighting Championship
- List of UFC champions
- List of UFC events
- 2008 in UFC
