= Matt Wiman =

American mixed martial arts fighter

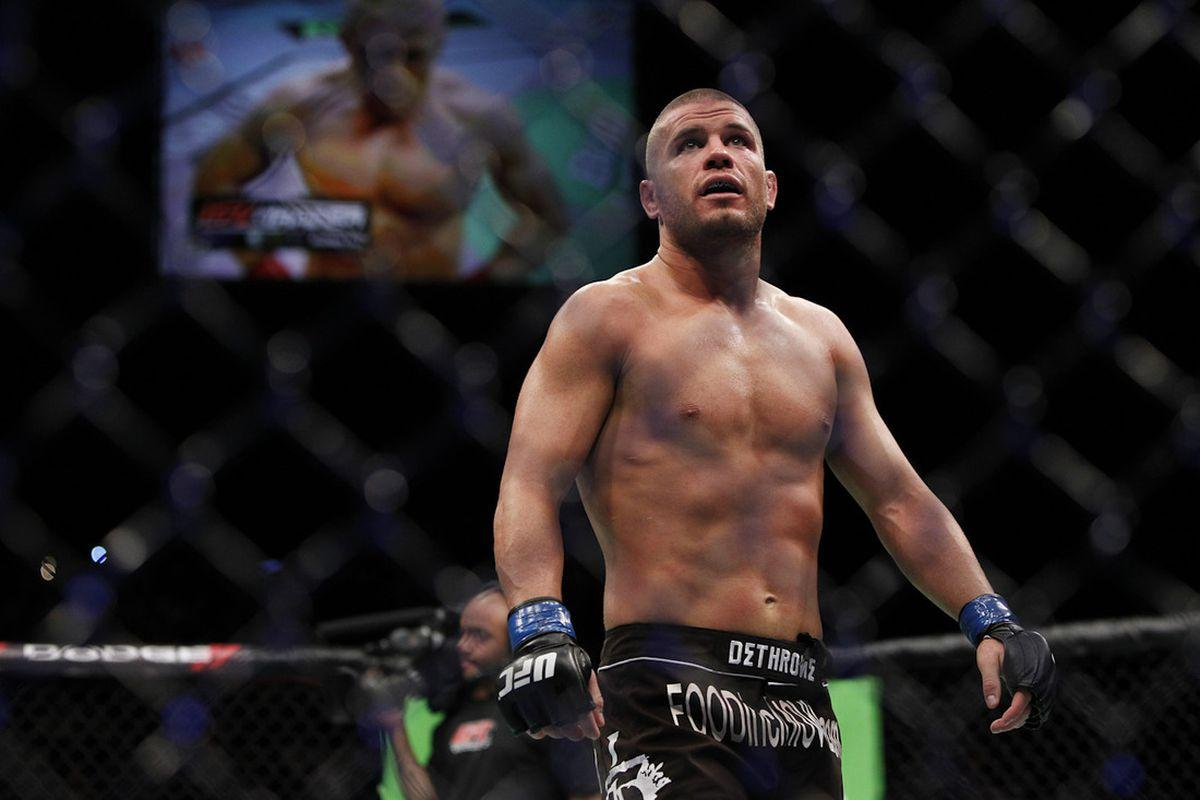
- Born: September 19, 1983 (age 43); Denver, Colorado, U.S.
- Height: 5 ft 10 in (1.78 m)
- Weight: 155 lb (70 kg; 11 st 1 lb)
- Division: Lightweight
- Reach: 67 in (170 cm)
- Fighting out of: Dallas, Texas, U.S. Portland, Oregon, U.S.
- Years active: 2004—2020

Mixed martial arts record
- Total: 26
- Wins: 16
- By knockout: 4
- By submission: 5
- By decision: 7
- Losses: 10
- By knockout: 4
- By decision: 6

Other information
- Mixed martial arts record from Sherdog

Matt Wiman (born September 19, 1983) is an American former professional mixed martial artist who competed as a lightweight. He competed in the Ultimate Fighting Championship.

== Background ==
Wiman graduated from Broken Arrow High School in Broken Arrow, Oklahoma, in 2002.

== Mixed martial arts career ==
=== Early career ===
Matt began training mixed martial arts with UFC fighter, Mikey Burnett, at the Lion's Den in Tulsa, Oklahoma.

Wiman's initiation into professional fighting came on August 14, 2004. A relatively unknown fighter at the time, Matt entered the Extreme Fight Night tournament organized by kickboxer, Dale Cook. Matt won 3 fights that night to become the Extreme Fighting League Middleweight Champion. He defeated Joseph Garza and Greg Bossler, each by unanimous decision, before finishing Venn Johns by triangle choke for the championship belt.

Matt's first title defense came on November 13, 2004, when he defeated David Franks by armbar 42 seconds into the first round.

He defended the title again on February 5, 2005, with a 20-second KO of D.J. Randall.

Wiman first gained national attention at FFC 15-Fiesta Las Vegas on September 15, 2005, against fellow rising star Roger Huerta. It was a back and forth fight, with both fighters nearly finishing on several occasions. Matt lost a close decision. As a result of their impressive performances, Wiman and Huerta both caught the eyes of Dana White and UFC matchmaker, Joe Silva.

Wiman defended his Extreme Fight League championship belt for a third and final time on November 12, 2005, at Battle at the Brady 2 against Thomas Grissom. Matt won by referee stoppage in the 1st round due to multiple cuts sustained by Grissom.

Wiman's next fight was at MFC-Boardwalk Blitz on March 14, 2006, in Atlantic City, New Jersey, against UFC veteran, Nick Agallar. Matt lost by unanimous decision.

=== Ultimate Fighting Championship ===
When an injury forced Leonard Garcia out of his scheduled fight with Spencer Fisher at UFC 60, Wiman agreed to replace Garcia on short notice. On May 27, 2006, Wiman lost to Fisher by KO in the second round.

=== The Ultimate Fighter Season 5 ===
Wiman was a contestant on The Ultimate Fighter 5 show. He was the second pick (after Gray Maynard) for B.J. Penn's team. His preliminary fight was against Marlon Sims. Wiman landed a devastating overhand right in the opening seconds of the fight, climbed on the back of Sims and choked him unconscious. Wiman was defeated by eventual finalist Manvel Gamburyan of Team Pulver in the quarterfinals by decision. Gamburyan and Wiman exchanged takedowns, but Gamburyan was on top most of the fight and got the victory, despite Dana White's thoughts that Wiman could make it to the finals of the show.

Wiman fought Brian Geraghty on June 23, 2007, at The Ultimate Fighter 5 Finale. He took his opponent down early and worked a ground and pound attack. Wiman landed strikes in Geraghty's guard and passed to full mount, where he unloaded with punches, causing referee Yves Lavigne to stop the fight due to unanswered strikes at 2:09 of round 1.

=== Ultimate Fighting Championship ===
Wiman's next fight was against Japanese judoka Michihiro Omigawa at UFC 76. Wiman controlled the fight with takedowns and ground control, and won a unanimous decision.

His next fight was against Justin Buchholz at UFC Fight Night 12 on January 23, 2008. Wiman scored a takedown in the opening moments of the fight and worked quickly to the mount position. He landed an elbow below the right eye of Buchholz causing a cut. The UFC newcomer turned over to avoid further strikes to the face and Wiman secured the back position. After a brief struggle to secure the rear naked choke, Wiman forced Buchholz to submit at 2:58 of the first round, giving him his third straight UFC victory.

Wiman's next fight was against Thiago Tavares at UFC 85. After many back and forth grappling exchanges in round one, he eventually KO'd Tavares with a right hook in the second round. This fight earned him a Fight of the Night award.

At UFC: Fight for the Troops, Wiman lost a one-sided unanimous decision to fellow rising star, Jim Miller, replacing an injured Frankie Edgar. This fight earned him another Fight of the Night award.

On April 18, 2009, Wiman faced Canadian striker Sam Stout at UFC 97 in Montreal, Quebec. In a closely contested fight, Wiman seemed hurt from a flush liver shot late in round two, but rallied and controlled Stout for the final round. He lost via unanimous decision (29-28, 29-28, 29-28). This fight earned him another Fight of the Night award.

Woman was scheduled to fight Rafael dos Anjos on September 19, 2009, at UFC 103, but was forced to withdraw because of a knee injury. He was replaced by Rob Emerson.

On December 12, 2009, Wiman defeated Shane Nelson at UFC 107 via unanimous decision.

Wiman defeated Mac Danzig via first round submission at UFC 115. However, the stoppage was apparently premature and mistaken as Wiman had Danzig in a tight guillotine choke and referee Yves Lavigne called a stoppage despite the fact that Danzig had not submitted and was still conscious.

Wiman was expected to face Danzig in a rematch on September 15, 2010, at UFC Fight Night 22, however Danzig was forced off the card with an injury. Wiman was then set to face Efraín Escudero, but Wiman was also forced out of the bout with an injury and was replaced by Charles Oliveira.

Wiman was expected to face Cole Miller on January 1, 2011, at UFC 125, but the bout eventually took place on January 22, 2011, at UFC Fight Night 23. Wiman dominated Miller for all 3 rounds, resulting in a unanimous decision victory.

Wiman faced Dennis Siver on July 2, 2011, at UFC 132. He lost the fight via unanimous decision where UFC President Dana White stated he felt Wiman's pain at the post-fight press conference and understood why he wouldn't show up (to the post-fight press conference) after a fight like that.

Wiman won a rematch with Mac Danzig via unanimous decision on October 1, 2011, at UFC on Versus 6. The back and forth action earned Fight of the Night honors.

Wiman was expected to face Mark Bocek on April 21, 2012, at UFC 145. However, Wiman was forced from the bout with an injury and was replaced by returning UFC veteran John Alessio.

Wiman defeated Paul Sass via first round armbar submission on September 29, 2012, at UFC on Fuel TV 5. This fight earned him a Submission of the Night award.

Wiman faced T. J. Grant on January 26, 2013, at UFC on Fox 6. He lost the fight via KO in the first round.

After an absence of nearly two years, Wiman returned from an extended hiatus and faced Isaac Vallie-Flagg at UFC Fight Night 57 on November 22, 2014. He won the back-and-forth fight via unanimous decision.

Wiman was expected to face Leonardo Santos on March 21, 2015, at UFC Fight Night 62. However, Wiman was forced out of the bout on February 11 with a back injury and was replaced by Tony Martin.

Wiman returned from an extended hiatus and faced Luis Peña on June 22, 2019, at UFC on ESPN+ 12. He lost the fight via technical knockout in round three.

Wiman faced promotional newcomer Joe Solecki on December 7, 2019, at UFC on ESPN 7. He lost the fight via unanimous decision.

Wiman faced Jordan Leavitt on December 5, 2020, at UFC on ESPN 19. He lost the fight via knockout in round one.

After fighting out his last fight for the UFC, Matt announced his retirement from the sport.

== Championships and accomplishments ==
- Ultimate Fighting Championship
  - Fight of the Night (Four times) vs. Thiago Tavares, Jim Miller, Sam Stout and Mac Danzig 2
  - Submission of the Night (One time) vs. Paul Sass
  - UFC Encyclopedia Awards
    - Fight of the Night (One time) vs. Spencer Fisher
  - UFC.com Awards
    - 2008: Ranked #3 Fight of the Year vs. Thiago Tavares
    - 2012: Ranked #2 Submission of the Year vs. Paul Sass & Ranked #4 Upset of the Year vs. Paul Sass
- MMA Fighting
  - 2008 #5 Ranked UFC Knockout of the Year vs. Thiago Tavares at UFC 85

== Mixed martial arts record ==
Professional record breakdown
26 matches	16 wins	10 losses
By knockout	4	4
By submission	5	0
By decision	7	6

Res.	Record	Opponent	Method	Event	Date	Round	Time	Location	Notes
Loss	16–10	Jordan Leavitt	KO (slam)	UFC on ESPN: Hermansson vs. Vettori	December 5, 2020	1	0:22	Las Vegas, Nevada, United States	
Loss	16–9	Joe Solecki	Decision (unanimous)	UFC on ESPN: Overeem vs. Rozenstruik	December 7, 2019	3	5:00	Washington, D.C., United States	
Loss	16–8	Luis Peña	TKO (punches)	UFC Fight Night: Moicano vs. Korean Zombie	June 22, 2019	3	1:14	Greenville, South Carolina, United States	
Win	16–7	Isaac Vallie-Flagg	Decision (unanimous)	UFC Fight Night: Edgar vs. Swanson	November 22, 2014	3	5:00	Austin, Texas, United States	
Loss	15–7	T. J. Grant	KO (elbows and punches)	UFC on Fox: Johnson vs. Dodson	January 26, 2013	1	4:51	Chicago, Illinois, United States	
Win	15–6	Paul Sass	Submission (armbar)	UFC on Fuel TV: Struve vs. Miocic	September 29, 2012	1	3:48	Nottingham, England	Submission of the Night.
Win	14–6	Mac Danzig	Decision (unanimous)	UFC Live: Cruz vs. Johnson	October 1, 2011	3	5:00	Washington, D.C., United States	Fight of the Night
Loss	13–6	Dennis Siver	Decision (unanimous)	UFC 132	July 2, 2011	3	5:00	Las Vegas, Nevada, United States	
Win	13–5	Cole Miller	Decision (unanimous)	UFC: Fight for the Troops 2	January 22, 2011	3	5:00	Fort Hood, Texas, United States	
Win	12–5	Mac Danzig	Technical Submission (guillotine choke)	UFC 115	June 12, 2010	1	1:45	Vancouver, British Columbia, Canada	
Win	11–5	Shane Nelson	Decision (unanimous)	UFC 107	December 12, 2009	3	5:00	Memphis, Tennessee, United States	
Loss	10–5	Sam Stout	Decision (unanimous)	UFC 97	April 18, 2009	3	5:00	Montreal, Quebec, Canada	Fight of the Night.
Loss	10–4	Jim Miller	Decision (unanimous)	UFC: Fight for the Troops	December 10, 2008	3	5:00	Fayetteville, North Carolina, United States	Fight of the Night.
Win	10–3	Thiago Tavares	KO (punches)	UFC 85	June 7, 2008	2	1:57	London, England	Fight of the Night.
Win	9–3	Justin Buchholz	Submission (rear-naked choke)	UFC Fight Night: Swick vs. Burkman	January 23, 2008	1	2:56	Las Vegas, Nevada, United States	
Win	8–3	Michihiro Omigawa	Decision (unanimous)	UFC 76	September 22, 2007	3	5:00	Anaheim, California, United States	
Win	7–3	Brian Geraghty	TKO (punches)	The Ultimate Fighter 5 Finale	June 23, 2007	1	2:09	Las Vegas, Nevada, United States	
Loss	6–3	Spencer Fisher	KO (flying knee)	UFC 60	May 27, 2006	2	1:43	Los Angeles, California, United States	
Loss	6–2	Nick Agallar	Decision (unanimous)	MFC: Boardwalk Blitz	March 4, 2006	3	5:00	Atlantic City, New Jersey, United States	
Win	6–1	Mark Thomas Grissom	TKO (corner stoppage)	XFL 18: Battle at the Brady 2	November 12, 2005	1	3:00	Tulsa, Oklahoma, United States	
Loss	5–1	Roger Huerta	Decision (unanimous)	FFC 15: Fiesta Las Vegas	September 14, 2005	3	5:00	Las Vegas, Nevada, United States	
Win	5–0	D.J. Randall	TKO (punches)	XFL: Xtreme Fighting 3: Superbrawl	February 5, 2005	1	0:20	Miami, Oklahoma, United States	
Win	4–0	David Frank	Submission (armbar)	XFL: EK 14: Heavyweight Gladiators	November 13, 2004	1	0:42	Tulsa, Oklahoma, United States	
Win	3–0	Venn Johns	Submission (triangle choke)	XFL: EK 13: Elimination	August 14, 2004	2	1:30	Tulsa, Oklahoma, United States	
Win	2–0	Greg Bossler	Decision (unanimous)	XFL: EK 13: Elimination	August 14, 2004	3	5:00	Tulsa, Oklahoma, United States	
Win	1–0	Joe Garza	Decision (unanimous)	XFL: EK 13: Elimination	August 14, 2004	3	5:00	Tulsa, Oklahoma, United States	

== See also ==
- List of male mixed martial artists
