= Roan Carneiro =

Brazilian mixed martial arts fighter

- Born: Roan Carneiro Pereira; 2 June 1978 (age 48); Rio de Janeiro, Brazil
- Other names: Jucão
- Height: 5 ft 11 in (180 cm)
- Weight: 184.5 lb (83.7 kg)
- Division: Middleweight; Welterweight
- Reach: 74 1/2 in (189 cm)
- Fighting out of: Atlanta, Georgia, United States
- Team: American Top Team
- Rank: 4th degree Black belt in Brazilian Jiu-Jitsu under Ricardo Liborio
- Years active: 2000–2019

Mixed martial arts record
- Total: 35
- Wins: 22
- By knockout: 3
- By submission: 10
- By decision: 9
- Losses: 13
- By knockout: 4
- By submission: 3
- By decision: 6

Other information
- Mixed martial arts record from Sherdog

Roan Carneiro Pereira (born 2 June 1978) is a Brazilian retired professional mixed martial artist who most recently competed in the Welterweight division of the Ultimate Fighting Championship. A professional competitor since 2000, Carneiro was the winner of the Battlegrounds MMA's one-night, eight-man tournament, in which he won three fights to become the champion, and has also competed for DEEP.

== Mixed martial arts career ==
=== Early career ===
Carneiro began fighting in MMA professionally in 2000 at the age of 22 in his native Brazil. One of his earliest losses was to future longtime UFC Middleweight Champion Anderson Silva. He amassed a record of 10–5 before signing with the Ultimate Fighting Championship.

=== Ultimate Fighting Championship ===
In April 2007, Carneiro debuted with the UFC. He faced Rich Clementi in his debut and won the fight via unanimous decision.

Carneiro then faced Jon Fitch at UFC Fight Night 10. He lost the fight via submission in the second round.

In his third UFC fight, Carneiro faced Tony DeSouza at UFC 79 on 29 December 2007. He won the fight via TKO in the second round.

Carneiro next faced Kevin Burns at UFC 85 on 7 June 2008. He lost the fight via submission in the second round.

For his fifth UFC fight, Carneiro faced Ryo Chonan at UFC 88 on 6 September 2008. He lost the fight via split decision. Following this loss, he was released from his contract.

=== Battleground MMA ===
After fighting sporadically for independent promotions between 2009 and 2013, Carneiro signed to compete in a one-night, eight-man tournament for BattleGrounds MMA on 3 October 2014. In the quarterfinals, he defeated Randall Wallace by submission in the first round. In the semifinals, he defeated Trey Houston by TKO in the second round. In the finals, Carneiro defeated Brock Larson by unanimous decision to be crowned the tournament champion.

=== UFC return ===
In December 2014, it was announced that Carneiro had been re-signed with the UFC. In his return fight, Carneiro replaced Caio Magalhaes against Mark Muñoz on 28 February 2015 at UFC 184. He won the fight via technical submission from a rear-naked choke in the first round.

Carneiro was expected to face Gegard Mousasi on 27 September 2015 at UFC Fight Night 75. However, Carneiro was forced to pull out of the bout in mid-August with an elbow injury and was replaced by Uriah Hall.

Carneiro faced Derek Brunson on 21 February 2016 at UFC Fight Night 83. He lost the fight via TKO in the first round.

Carneiro next faced Kenny Robertson on 17 September 2016 at UFC Fight Night 94. He won the fight via split decision.

As the last fight of his prevailing contract, Carneiro faced Ryan LaFlare on 11 February 2017 at UFC 208. He lost the fight by unanimous decision. UFC elected not to renew Carneiro's contract, making him a free agent.

=== Post-UFC ===
Carneiro then signed a non-exclusive contract with Absolute Championship Akhmat, losing the first two fights against Aslambek Saidov and Husein Kushagov.

Carneiro returned to action on 30 November 2019 in Auckland, New Zealand where he won WKN Middleweight MMA title by submission in the first round against previously 15-fight undefeated Kelvin Joseph in the main event of WKN World Cup 2019.

== Acting ==
Carneiro had an acting role as fictional MMA fighter Marco Santos in the MMA movie Warrior.

== Personal life ==
Carneiro has a son and a daughter.

== Championships and accomplishments ==
=== Mixed martial arts ===
- BattleGrounds MMA
  - BattleGrounds MMA Grand Prix Championship
- World Kickboxing Network
  - WKN Middleweight MMA title

=== Brazilian jiu-jitsu ===
- Abu Dhabi Brazilian Trials Winner
- Pan American Champion
- Rio de Janeiro State Champion

== Mixed martial arts record ==
Professional record breakdown
35 matches	22 wins	13 losses
By knockout	3	4
By submission	10	3
By decision	9	6

Res.	Record	Opponent	Method	Event	Date	Round	Time	Location	Notes
Win	22–13	Kelvin Joseph	Submission (rear-naked choke)	WKN World Cup 2019	30 November 2019	1	4:50	Auckland, New Zealand	Won the WKN Middleweight MMA Championship.
Loss	21–13	Husein Kushagov	Decision (split)	ACA 91: Agujev vs. Silvério	26 January 2019	3	5:00	Grozny, Russia	
Loss	21–12	Aslambek Saidov	Decision (unanimous)	ACB 81: Saidov vs. Carneiro	23 February 2018	3	5:00	Dubai, United Arab Emirates	
Loss	21–11	Ryan LaFlare	Decision (unanimous)	UFC 208	11 February 2017	3	5:00	Brooklyn, New York, United States	
Win	21–10	Kenny Robertson	Decision (split)	UFC Fight Night: Poirier vs. Johnson	17 September 2016	3	5:00	Hidalgo, Texas, United States	Return to Welterweight.
Loss	20–10	Derek Brunson	TKO (punches)	UFC Fight Night: Cowboy vs. Cowboy	21 February 2016	1	2:38	Pittsburgh, Pennsylvania, United States	
Win	20–9	Mark Muñoz	Technical Submission (rear-naked choke)	UFC 184	28 February 2015	1	1:40	Los Angeles, California, United States	Return to Middleweight.
Win	19–9	Brock Larson	Decision (unanimous)	BattleGrounds MMA 5: O.N.E.	4 October 2014	3	5:00	Tulsa, Oklahoma, United States	Won the BattleGrounds MMA Welterweight Grand Prix.
Win	18–9	Trey Houston	TKO (punches)	BattleGrounds MMA 5: O.N.E.	4 October 2014	2	2:11	Tulsa, Oklahoma, United States	Welterweight Grand Prix Semifinal.
Win	17–9	Randall Wallace	Submission (straight armbar)	BattleGrounds MMA 5: O.N.E.	4 October 2014	1	3:29	Tulsa, Oklahoma, United States	Welterweight Grand Prix Quarterfinal.
Win	16–9	Sean Huffman	Submission (rear-naked choke)	Wild Bill's Fight Night 60	18 October 2013	1	1:59	Duluth, Georgia, United States	Catchweight (180 lbs) bout.
Win	15–9	Jung Hwan Cha	Technical Submission (armbar)	Road FC 7: Recharged	24 March 2012	1	4:41	Seoul, South Korea	Catchweight (176 lbs) bout.
Loss	14–9	Tommy Depret	Submission (armbar)	United Glory 13	19 March 2011	1	2:36	Charleroi, Belgium	Welterweight Tournament Semifinal.
Win	14–8	Luis Ramos	Decision (unanimous)	United Glory 12	16 October 2010	3	5:00	Amsterdam, Netherlands	Welterweight Tournament Quarterfinal.
Win	13–8	Jorge Patino	Decision (unanimous)	Shine Fights 2: ATT vs. The World	4 September 2009	3	5:00	Miami, Florida, United States	
Loss	12–8	Ryo Chonan	Decision (split)	UFC 88	6 September 2008	3	5:00	Atlanta, Georgia, United States	
Loss	12–7	Kevin Burns	Submission (triangle choke)	UFC 85	7 June 2008	2	2:53	London, England	
Win	12–6	Tony DeSouza	TKO (punches)	UFC 79	29 December 2007	2	3:33	Las Vegas, Nevada, United States	
Loss	11–6	Jon Fitch	Submission (rear-naked choke)	UFC Fight Night: Stout vs. Fisher	12 June 2007	2	1:07	Hollywood, Florida, United States	
Win	11–5	Rich Clementi	Decision (unanimous)	UFC Fight Night: Stevenson vs. Guillard	5 April 2007	3	5:00	Las Vegas, Nevada, United States	
Loss	10–5	Fabio Negao	Decision (unanimous)	Cla Fighting Championships 1	23 November 2006	3	5:00	São Paulo, Brazil	
Win	10–4	Yoshitomo Watanabe	Submission (arm-triangle choke)	Show Fight 5	9 November 2006	1	1:36	São Paulo, Brazil	
Win	9–4	Daisuke Ishii	Decision (unanimous)	DEEP: 25 Impact	4 August 2006	3	5:00	Tokyo, Japan	
Loss	8–4	Leonardo Lucio Nascimento	TKO (corner stoppage)	WCFC: No Guts No Glory	18 March 2006	1	5:00	Manchester, England	WCFC Middleweight Tournament Final.
Win	8–3	Matt Horwich	Decision (split)	WCFC: No Guts No Glory	18 March 2006	3	5:00	Manchester, England	WCFC Middleweight Tournament Semifinal.
Win	7–3	Gregory Bouchelaghem	Decision (unanimous)	WCFC: No Guts No Glory	18 March 2006	3	5:00	Manchester, England	WCFC Middleweight Tournament Quarterfinal.
Win	6–3	Claudio Mattos	Submission	Fight for Respect 1	15 October 2005	N/A	N/A	Lisbon, Portugal	
Loss	5–3	Ryo Chonan	TKO (doctor stoppage)	DEEP: 18th Impact	12 February 2005	3	2:15	Tokyo, Japan	
Win	5–2	Paul Jenkins	Submission (rear-naked choke)	Shooto: Switzerland 2	4 September 2004	1	N/A	Zurich, Switzerland	
Win	4–2	Rodrigo Ruas	Decision (unanimous)	Absolute FC: Brazil 1	28 August 2004	3	5:00	Nova Friburgo, Brazil	
Win	3–2	Adriano Verdelli	Submission (anaconda choke)	Meca World Vale Tudo 9	1 August 2003	1	1:11	Rio de Janeiro, Brazil	
Win	2–2	Sebastian Borean	Submission (choke)	Argentina Fighting Championships 1	10 May 2003	1	N/A	Buenos Aires, Argentina	
Win	1–2	Carlos Esponja	TKO (submission to punches)	Meca World Vale Tudo 7	8 November 2002	1	N/A	Curitiba, Brazil	
Loss	0–2	Anderson Silva	TKO (submission to punches)	Meca World Vale Tudo 6	31 January 2002	1	5:33	Curitiba, Brazil	
Loss	0–1	Marcelo Belmiro	Decision (unanimous)	Heroes 1	24 July 2000	1	10:00	Rio de Janeiro, Brazil	

== See also ==
- List of current UFC fighters
- List of male mixed martial artists
