= Justin Buchholz =

American mixed martial arts fighter

- Born: August 22, 1983 (age 43); Fairbanks, Alaska, United States
- Height: 6 ft 0 in (1.83 m)
- Weight: 170 lb (77 kg; 12 st)
- Division: Welterweight; Lightweight
- Fighting out of: Sacramento, California
- Rank: Purple Belt in Brazilian Jiu-Jitsu
- Years active: 2005-2018

Mixed martial arts record
- Total: 27
- Wins: 16
- By knockout: 8
- By submission: 6
- By decision: 1
- By disqualification: 1
- Losses: 11
- By knockout: 4
- By submission: 3
- By decision: 4

Other information
- Mixed martial arts record from Sherdog

Justin Buchholz (born August 22, 1983) is a Filipino-American former mixed martial arts fighter. A professional from 2005 until 2018, he fought in the UFC, EliteXC and World Series of Fighting.

== Background ==
Buchholz graduated from Lathrop High School in Fairbanks, Alaska in 2002, where he competed in wrestling.

== Mixed martial arts career ==
Buchholz is a former ICON Sport and Showdown Fights lightweight champion. He has also fought in EliteXC and he held an 8–1 record before signing with the Ultimate Fighting Championship (UFC).

=== Ultimate Fighting Championship ===
He lost his first UFC fight at UFC Fight Night 12 against Matt Wiman on January 23, 2008. He earned his first victory at UFC 86 against TUF 5 contestant and three-to-one favorite, Corey Hill.

Buchholz was defeated by Terry Etim via D'Arce choke at UFC 99. They traded heavy kicks and punches for the first few minutes of the bout before Buchholz landed a hard right hand which broke Etim's nose. Etim was able to survive the round and landed some hard leg kicks in round two, before hurting Buchholz with multiple knees from the clinch. A scramble ensued before the fight went to the mat and from there Etim was able to lock in a D'Arce choke to finish the fight.

In his next fight, Buchholz faced Jeremy Stephens, where he lost due to a cut in the first round.

Buchholz was defeated by Mac Danzig on February 6, 2010, at UFC 109. He was subsequently released from the UFC.

=== Independent ===
Buchholz fell to a fourth straight defeat in his first post-UFC fight on February 25, 2011; he lost to Jason Meaders via technical knockout (doctor stoppage) in the first round.

Buchholz picked up a win on April 16, 2011, defeating Steve Sharp by submission (rear naked choke) in the first round.

Buchholz then fought fellow UFC veteran Steve Lopez on May 21, 2011, at SCC: Superior Cage Combat 1. Buchholz won by a kick.

Buchholz defeated Thiago Meller via unanimous decision on August 20, 2011, at SCC: Superior Cage Combat 2.

Buchholz had a rematch with Clay Collard, which he lost by split decision.

On September 20, 2017, Buchholz accepted a short notice fight against Marques Facine at AFC 133 and won via TKO in the first round. Facine fell off the mat and Buchholz started unleashing soccer kicks to the body; his last attempt grazed Facine's head before the referee called for a stoppage. The referee awarded the win to Buchholz; he called the last kick as accidental and it did not decide the outcome of the fight as Facine was defenseless in absorbing the kicks to the body.

== Personal life ==
Buchholz briefly co-hosted a bi-weekly Live MMA show/podcast, Stud Radio (formerly TAM Radio), and continued to corner fighters. In January 2016 he became one of Team Alpha Male coaches alongside Urijah Faber and Danny Castillo. He was kicked off the team in January 2018.

== Championships and accomplishments ==
- Icon Sport
  - Icon Sport Lightweight Championship (One time)
- Showdown Fights
  - Showdown Fights Lightweight Championship (One time)

== Mixed martial arts record ==
Professional record breakdown
27 matches	16 wins	11 losses
By knockout	8	4
By submission	6	3
By decision	1	4
By disqualification	1	0

Res.	Record	Opponent	Method	Event	Date	Round	Time	Location	Notes
Loss	16–11	Carlton Minus	Decision (unanimous)	Alaska Fighting Championship 140	May 16, 2018	3	5:00	Anchorage, Alaska, United States	
Win	16–10	Marques Facine	TKO (punches and body kicks)	Alaska Fighting Championship 133	September 20, 2017	1	2:25	Anchorage, Alaska, United States	Catchweight (175 lbs) bout.
Loss	15–10	Ernest Chavez	KO (punch)	The Warriors Cage 23: Halloween Havoc 5	October 30, 2015	1	3:22	Porterville, California, United States	
Loss	15–9	Lewis Gonzalez	Decision (split)	WSOF 16	December 13, 2014	3	5:00	Sacramento, California, United States	Welterweight debut.
Loss	15–8	Clay Collard	Decision (split)	Showdown Fights: Buchholz vs. Collard 2	September 28, 2013	5	5:00	Orem, Utah, United States	Lost the Showdown Fights Lightweight Championship
Win	15–7	Gordon Bell	KO (punch)	Showdown Fights: Buchholz vs. Bell	May 10, 2013	1	2:06	Orem, Utah, United States	Defended the Showdown Fights Lightweight Championship
Win	14–7	David Castillo	TKO (punches)	Showdown Fights: Buchholz vs. Castillo	November 16, 2012	3	3:29	Orem, Utah, United States	Won the Showdown Fights Lightweight Championship
Win	13–7	Clay Collard	Submission (guillotine choke)	Showdown Fights - Burkman vs. Yager	August 25, 2012	3	1:35	Orem, Utah, United States	
Loss	12–7	John Gunderson	Submission (kimura)	Superior Cage Combat 4	February 16, 2012	3	2:34	Las Vegas, Nevada, United States	For the SCC Lightweight Championship.
Win	12–6	Thiago Meller	Decision (unanimous)	Superior Cage Combat 2	August 20, 2011	3	5:00	Las Vegas, Nevada, United States	
Win	11–6	Steve Lopez	KO (front kick)	Superior Cage Combat 1	May 21, 2011	3	4:30	Las Vegas, Nevada, United States	
Win	10–6	Steve Sharp	Submission (rear naked choke)	Showdown Fights: Shootout	April 16, 2011	1	3:38	Orem, Utah, United States	
Loss	9–6	Jason Meaders	TKO (cut)	MEZ Sports: Pandemonium 4	February 25, 2011	1	3:00	Riverside, California, United States	
Loss	9–5	Mac Danzig	Decision (unanimous)	UFC 109	February 6, 2010	3	5:00	Las Vegas, Nevada, United States	
Loss	9–4	Jeremy Stephens	TKO (cut)	UFC Fight Night: Diaz vs. Guillard	September 16, 2009	1	3:23	Oklahoma City, Oklahoma, United States	
Loss	9–3	Terry Etim	Submission (d'arce choke)	UFC 99	June 13, 2009	2	2:38	Cologne, Germany	
Win	9–2	Corey Hill	Submission (rear naked choke)	UFC 86	July 5, 2008	2	3:57	Las Vegas, Nevada, United States	
Loss	8–2	Matt Wiman	Submission (rear naked choke)	UFC Fight Night 12	January 23, 2008	1	2:56	Las Vegas, Nevada, United States	
Win	8–1	Ikaika Choy-Fu	TKO (punches)	EliteXC: Uprising	September 15, 2007	1	1:35	Honolulu, Hawaii, United States	
Win	7–1	Marshall Harvest	KO (punch)	Icon Sport: Epic	March 31, 2007	1	0:31	Honolulu, Hawaii, United States	
Win	6–1	Brandon Pieper	TKO (punches)	Icon Sport: All In	February 9, 2007	1	1:07	Honolulu, Hawaii, United States	
Win	5–1	Arto Woods	Submission (triangle choke)	ROTR: Beatdown 2	October 21, 2006	1	2:34	Hilo, Hawaii, United States	
Win	4–1	Matt Peter	KO (punch)	Desert Brawl: Bikes, Babes, Brawls	June 17, 2006	1	2:50	Fairbanks, Alaska, United States	
Loss	3–1	Rodney Rhoden	TKO (referee stoppage)	Alaska Fighting Championship 22	April 12, 2006	1	2:33	Anchorage, Alaska, United States	
Win	3–0	Bo Underwood	DQ (illegal kick)	Alaska Fighting Championship 12	June 8, 2005	1	N/A	Anchorage, Alaska, United States	
Win	2–0	Jimmy Gainey	Submission (triangle choke)	Alaska Fighting Championship 9	March 9, 2005	2	N/A	Anchorage, Alaska, United States	
Win	1–0	Andy Garnand	Submission	Alaska Fighting Championship 8	February 16, 2005	1	N/A	Anchorage, Alaska, United States	
