= Yoshiyuki Yoshida =

Japanese mixed martial artist

- Born: May 10, 1974 (age 52); Tokyo, Japan
- Native name: 吉田善行
- Other names: Zenko
- Nationality: Japanese
- Height: 5 ft 11 in (1.80 m)
- Weight: 167 lb (76 kg; 11.9 st)
- Division: Middleweight; Welterweight; Lightweight
- Reach: 70.0 in (178 cm)
- Style: Judo
- Stance: Southpaw
- Fighting out of: Albuquerque, New Mexico, U.S.
- Team: Tokyo Yellow Mans; Jackson's Submission Fighting
- Teacher: Noboru Asahi
- Rank: 4th Dan Black Belt in Judo
- Years active: 2005–present (MMA)

Mixed martial arts record
- Total: 27
- Wins: 18
- By knockout: 8
- By submission: 6
- By decision: 3
- By disqualification: 1
- Losses: 9
- By knockout: 3
- By decision: 6

Other information
- University: Tokyo Gakugei University
- Mixed martial arts record from Sherdog
- Last updated on: October 17, 2012

Yoshiyuki Yoshida (吉田善行, Yoshida Yoshiyuki) (born May 10, 1974) is a Japanese mixed martial artist competing in the welterweight division. A student of former Shooto competitor Noboru Asahi, he has competed in Shooto, Cage Force, and the UFC. On December 1, 2007, he became the first Cage Force welterweight tournament winner.

== Career ==
=== Early career ===
In 2007, Yoshida was entered into a Cage Force welterweight tournament sponsored by the Worldwide Cage Network. In the opening round of the tournament, Yoshida defeated two-time interim Pancrase champion Katsuya Inoue by knockout. He went on to defeat Matt Cain in the quarterfinals and former Shooto champion Akira Kikuchi in the semi-finals of the tournament. In the finals, Yoshida defeated Dan Hardy by disqualification after being struck by a kick to the groin, becoming the first Cage Force welterweight tournament winner.

=== Ultimate Fighting Championship ===
After the tournament's closing, Yoshida was offered a contract with the Ultimate Fighting Championship. It was originally speculated that the winners of the Cage Force tournaments were to be selected to compete in the UFC's active roster. Yoshida made his debut in the UFC at UFC 84, choking The Ultimate Fighter 6 contestant Jon Koppenhaver unconscious by Anaconda choke submission. He was scheduled to meet Karo Parisyan in September at UFC 88 but Parisyan pulled out of the bout only two hours before the weigh-ins citing an injury. Yoshida then faced Josh Koscheck at UFC: Fight for the Troops on December 10, 2008, a fight which he lost by 1st round knockout. Unfortunately for Yoshida, the first knockout punch from Koscheck occurred with Yoshida's back against the cage, preventing Yoshida from falling down, allowing Koscheck to land another devastating haymaker on Yoshida's jaw, sending him crashing to the canvas in a motionless heap. UFC reported, "Yoshida, who remained on the canvas while being tended to by commission doctors, was removed from the Octagon on a stretcher as a precautionary measure. He was later treated and released from a local hospital for a concussion".

Yoshida then fought Brandon Wolff at UFC 98: Evans vs. Machida on May 23, 2009, and won the bout by guillotine choke in the first round.

Yoshida's fought against Anthony Johnson at UFC 104. The fight became a catchweight bout of 176 when Johnson missed weight by six pounds, Yoshida (weighed in at 170 lb) agreed to fight at catchweight. Yoshida lost by first round TKO.

Yoshida then faced Mike Guymon on May 8, 2010, at UFC 113. Yoshida lost to Guymon by unanimous decision, losing all three rounds.

After losing to Guymon and dropping his UFC record to 2-3, Yoshida was released from the UFC.

=== Bellator Fighting Championships ===
Yoshida made his debut for Bellator Fighting Championships on September 30, 2010, against Chris Lozano. He lost via corner stoppage between rounds 2 and 3 due to a severely swollen eye.

=== ONE Championship ===
On July 18 it was announced that Yoshida would be facing Pride FC, Elite XC, Strikeforce and UFC veteran Phil Baroni at ONE Fighting Championship: Champion vs. Champion at the Singapore Indoor Stadium on September 3. He won the fight via unanimous decision.

=== BAMMA ===
Yoshida was expected to face Nate Marquardt in the main event of BAMMA 9 to determine an Inaugural World Welterweight Champion. However, on January 13, 2012, Marquardt was released from his contract with BAMMA officially due to the promotion pushing back BAMMA 9, and therefore his promotional debut, to March 24, 2012. Sources close to the situation believe that the release was due to the promotion not being able to afford the fighter's contract.

=== Titan Fighting Championship ===
Yoshida was expected make his Titan Fighting Championships debut against Mike Ricci for the vacant Titan FC Lightweight Championship at Titan FC 31 on October 31, 2014. However, Ricci failed to make weight prior to the fight. Both men agreed to fight in a non-title 157 lb catchweight fight instead. However, Titan FC's Chief Operating Officer, Lex McMahon, announced that Yoshida was refusing to fight just hours before the event, forcing the cancellation of the fight entirely. Yoshida was immediately released from the promotion.

== Championships and accomplishments ==
- Greatest Common Multiple (GCM) Communication
  - Cage Force Welterweight Tournament Championship (One time)
- MMA Fighting
  - 2008 #7 Ranked UFC Submission of the Year vs. War Machine at UFC 84

== Mixed martial arts record ==
Professional record breakdown
27 matches	18 wins	9 losses
By knockout	8	3
By submission	6	0
By decision	3	6
By disqualification	1	0

Res.	Record	Opponent	Method	Event	Date	Round	Time	Location	Notes
Loss	18–9	Yoshiyuki Katahira	Decision (split)	Deep: Cage Impact 2016: Deep vs. WSOF-GC	December 17, 2016	3	5:00	Tokyo, Japan	Welterweight bout.
Win	18–8	Kimihiro Eto	TKO (punches)	Deep: 73 Impact	October 17, 2015	3	2:19	Tokyo, Japan	
Loss	17–8	Kota Shimoishi	Decision (unanimous)	Deep: Osaka Impact 2015	April 29, 2015	3	5:00	Osaka, Japan	
Loss	17–7	Satoru Kitaoka	Decision (unanimous)	Deep - Dream Impact 2014: Omisoka Special	December 31, 2014	3	5:00	Saitama, Japan	For Deep Lightweight Title
Win	17–6	Shigetoshi Iwase	Decision (unanimous)	Deep: 65 Impact	March 22, 2014	2	5:00	Tokyo, Japan	
Win	16–6	Won Sik Park	Submission (rear-naked choke)	DEEP: Cage Impact 2013	November 24, 2013	2	4:46	Tokyo, Japan	Lightweight debut.
Win	15–6	Niko Puhakka	Submission (guillotine choke)	Fight Festival 32	October 13, 2012	3	N/A	Helsinki, Finland	Catchweight (158 lb) bout.
Win	14–6	Jeremy Hamilton	Submission (rear-naked choke)	CFX 33: Minnesota vs. Japan	March 28, 2012	2	3:37	Minneapolis, Minnesota United States	
Win	13–6	Phil Baroni	Decision (unanimous)	ONE Fighting Championship 1: Champion vs. Champion	September 3, 2011	3	5:00	Kallang, Singapore	
Win	12–6	Ferrid Kheder	TKO (punches)	Fighting Marcou Arena 2	July 17, 2011	1	3:44	Herault, France	
Loss	11–6	Chris Lozano	TKO (corner stoppage)	Bellator 31	September 30, 2010	2	5:00	Lake Charles, Louisiana, United States	
Loss	11–5	Mike Guymon	Decision (unanimous)	UFC 113	May 8, 2010	3	5:00	Montreal, Quebec, Canada	
Loss	11–4	Anthony Johnson	TKO (punches)	UFC 104	October 24, 2009	1	0:41	Los Angeles, California, United States	176 lb. catchweight bout
Win	11–3	Brandon Wolff	Submission (guillotine choke)	UFC 98	May 23, 2009	1	2:24	Las Vegas, Nevada, United States	
Loss	10–3	Josh Koscheck	KO (punch)	UFC: Fight for the Troops	December 10, 2008	1	2:15	Fayetteville, North Carolina, United States	
Win	10–2	War Machine	Technical Submission (anaconda choke)	UFC 84	May 24, 2008	1	0:56	Las Vegas, Nevada, United States	
Win	9–2	Dan Hardy	DQ (accidental kick to the groin)	GCM: Cage Force 5	December 1, 2007	2	0:04	Tokyo, Japan	GCM welterweight final
Win	8–2	Akira Kikuchi	TKO (elbows)	GCM: Cage Force 4	September 8, 2007	1	4:33	Tokyo, Japan	GCM welterweight semi-final
Win	7–2	Matt Cain	TKO (punches)	GCM: Cage Force EX Eastern Bound	May 27, 2007	1	2:59	Tokyo, Japan	GCM welterweight quarter-final
Win	6–2	Katsuya Inoue	KO (punches)	GCM: Cage Force 2	March 17, 2007	1	1:45	Tokyo, Japan	GCM welterweight qualifier
Win	5–2	Asato Hashimoto	TKO (elbow injury)	GCM: Cage Force 1	November 25, 2006	1	0:35	Tokyo, Japan	
Win	4–2	Hossein Ojaghi	Submission (armbar)	GCM: D.O.G. 7	September 9, 2006	2	3:36	Tokyo, Japan	
Win	3–2	Luis Santos	TKO (corner stoppage)	Kokoro: Kill Or Be Killed	August 15, 2006	1	5:00	Tokyo, Japan	
Win	2–2	Mindaugas Smirnovas	TKO (punches)	Shooto: 3/24 in Korakuen Hall	March 24, 2006	1	4:00	Tokyo, Japan	
Loss	1–2	Keita Nakamura	Technical Decision (majority)	Shooto: 12/17 in Shinjuku Face	December 17, 2005	2	4:06	Tokyo, Japan	
Loss	1–1	Yoshitaro Niimi	Decision (majority)	Shooto: Shooter's Summer	July 14, 2005	2	5:00	Tokyo, Japan	
Win	1–0	Akihiro Yamazaki	Decision (unanimous)	Shooto: 2/6 in Kitazawa Town Hall	February 6, 2005	2	5:00	Tokyo, Japan	

== Submission grappling record ==
KO PUNCHES

Result	Opponent	Method	Event	Date	Round	Time	Notes
Loss	(Japan) Sotaro Yamada	Submission (reverse neck crank)	Quintet Fight Night 2	February 3, 2019	1	3:51	
Draw	(Japan) Daisuke Nakamura	Draw	Quintet Fight Night 2	February 3, 2019	1	10:00	

== See also ==
- List of Bellator MMA alumni
- List of ONE Championship alumni

== See also ==
- List of male mixed martial artists
