= Brandon Wolff =

American mixed martial arts fighter (born 1975)

- Born: October 18, 1975 (age 51); Kailua, Oahu, Hawaii, U.S.
- Height: 5 ft 9 in (1.75 m)
- Weight: 170 lb (77 kg; 12 st)
- Division: Welterweight
- Fighting out of: Kailua, Oahu, Hawaii, U.S.
- Team: MMAD, Defend Hawaii
- Years active: 2002–present

Mixed martial arts record
- Total: 13
- Wins: 7
- By knockout: 3
- By decision: 4
- Losses: 6
- By knockout: 2
- By submission: 3
- By decision: 1

Other information
- Mixed martial arts record from Sherdog

Brandon W.K. Wolff (born October 18, 1975) is an American mixed martial artist and former Navy SEAL, who is perhaps best known for his short stint in the Welterweight division of the Ultimate Fighting Championship nicknamed “Killer Bee”.

== Mixed martial arts career ==
Wolff made his professional MMA debut on January 5, 2002, when he faced David Santiago at Warriors of the New Millennium 4. He won the fight via first-round KO. Following this win, Wolff would compile a professional record of 7–3, with notable fights against UFC veterans Riki Fukuda and Chad Reiner before being signed by the Ultimate Fighting Championship in late 2008.

=== Ultimate Fighting Championship ===
In late 2008, Wolff signed with the UFC. He was expected to face Jon Koppenhaver in his debut; however, Koppenhaver would be released from the promotion after refusing to fight Wolff and for his comments on deceased UFC fighter Evan Tanner. Wolff would instead make his debut against Ben Saunders at UFC: Fight for the Troops on December 10, 2008. He lost the fight via first-round TKO (knees).

In his second fight for the promotion, Wolff faced Yoshiyuki Yoshida at UFC 98 on May 23, 2009. He lost the fight via guillotine choke, and was subsequently released from the promotion.

=== Post-UFC career ===
In his first fight after his UFC release, Wolff faced Dylan Clay at X-1: Nations Collide on June 14, 2010. He lost the fight via kimura, dropping Wolff to three losses in a row.

== Personal life ==
Before fighting professionally, Wolff was a U.S. Navy SEAL. Wolff graduated from Basic Underwater Demolition/SEAL Training (BUD/S) class 222 in 1999. Following SEAL Tactical Training (STT) and completion of a six-month probationary period, he received the Special Warfare insignia, also known as the "SEAL Trident". He received an honorable discharge in 2001 leaving as a Construction Mechanic Third Class rank. Wolff also has a twin brother, Brenton, who is also a former U.S. Navy SEAL graduated from BUD/S class 223. Wolff, later received his bachelor's degree from American Military University.

== Mixed martial arts record ==
Professional record breakdown
13 matches	7 wins	6 losses
By knockout	3	2
By submission	0	3
By decision	4	1
Draws	0	
No contests	0	

Res.	Record	Opponent	Method	Event	Date	Round	Time	Location	Notes
Loss	7–6	Dylan Clay	Submission (kimura)	X-1 - Nations Collide	June 4, 2010	3	4:06	Honolulu, Hawaii, United States	
Loss	7–5	Yoshiyuki Yoshida	Submission (guillotine choke)	UFC 98	May 23, 2009	1	2:24	Las Vegas, Nevada, United States	
Loss	7–4	Ben Saunders	TKO (knees)	UFC: Fight for the Troops	December 10, 2008	1	1:49	Fayetteville, North Carolina, United States	
Win	7–3	Chad Reiner	Decision (split)	X-1 - Legends	May 16, 2008	5	5:00	Honolulu, Hawaii, United States	Welterweight debut.
Win	6–3	Chad Klingensmith	Decision (unanimous)	EliteXC: Uprising	September 15, 2007	3	5:00	Honolulu, Hawaii, United States	
Win	5–3	Shu Nahiwawa	TKO (punches)	X-1 - Grand Prix 2007	August 4, 2007	1	3:02	Honolulu, Hawaii, United States	
Loss	4–3	Jeffery Painter	Submission (rear-naked choke)	Omaha Fight Club 09/29/06	September 29, 2006	2	0:55	Omaha, Nebraska, United States	
Win	4–2	Josh McDonald	TKO (doctor stoppage)	Rumble on the Rock 9	April 21, 2006	1	5:00	Honolulu, Hawaii, United States	
Loss	3–2	Riki Fukuda	TKO (punches)	K-1 World Grand Prix 2005 in Hawaii	July 29, 2005	2	2:49	Honolulu, Hawaii, United States	
Win	3–1	Jay Carter	Decision (unanimous)	ROTR - Proving Grounds	July 9, 2005	2	5:00	Hilo, Hawaii, United States	
Win	2–1	Hannibal Adofo	Decision (split)	WEC 6: Return of a Legend	March 27, 2003	3	5:00	Lemoore, California, United States	
Loss	1–1	Ian Helms	Decision (unanimous)	SuperBrawl 25	July 13, 2002	2	5:00	Honolulu, Hawaii, United States	
Win	1–0	David Santiago	KO (punch)	Warriors of the New Millennium 4	January 5, 2002	1	3:15	Lahania, Hawaii, United States	
