= Brodie Farber =

American mixed martial arts fighter

- Born: Brodie Kyle Farber; July 5, 1980 (age 46); Grass Valley, California, U.S.
- Height: 6 ft 1 in (1.85 m)
- Weight: 170 lb (77 kg; 12 st)
- Division: Light Heavyweight; Middleweight; Welterweight
- Stance: Orthodox
- Fighting out of: Carlsbad, California, United States
- Team: Tiger Muay Thai
- Rank: 1st degree black belt in Brazilian Jiu-Jitsu
- Years active: 2002–present

Mixed martial arts record
- Total: 24
- Wins: 17
- By knockout: 4
- By submission: 11
- By decision: 2
- Losses: 7
- By knockout: 4
- By submission: 2
- By decision: 1

Other information
- Mixed martial arts record from Sherdog

Brodie Kyle Farber (born July 5, 1980) is an American professional mixed martial artist who most recently competed in the Middleweight division. A professional since 2002, he has competed for the UFC and WEC.

== Mixed martial arts career ==
=== Early career ===
Farber made his professional debut in 2002, a win, and compiled a record of 13–3 before being signed by the UFC.

=== Ultimate Fighting Championship ===
Farber made his UFC debut at UFC: Silva vs. Irvin on July 19, 2008, against Rory Markham. After tagging and backing Markham up in the first round, Farber was knocked out with a head kick at 1:37.

He returned at UFC: Fight for the Troops on December 10, 2008, facing Luigi Fioravanti. Farber lost via unanimous decision and was later released from the UFC.

=== Post-UFC ===
Farber has gone 4–2 since leaving the UFC, last competing in September 2018.

== Mixed martial arts record ==
Professional record breakdown
23 matches	16 wins	7 losses
By knockout	4	4
By submission	10	2
By decision	2	1

Res.	Record	Opponent	Method	Event	Date	Round	Time	Location	Notes
Win	17–7	Mamoru Yamamoto	Submission (rear-naked choke)	MEFC 1	September 1, 2018	1	3:44	Payson, Arizona, United States	
Win	16–7	Josh Tamsen	Submission (guillotine choke)	MMAX: Maximum Cage Fighting	December 5, 2015	1	0:17	Mexico	Return to Middleweight.
Loss	15–7	Leonard Smith	TKO (doctor stoppage)	Xplode Fighting Series: Anarchy	September 22, 2012	2	5:00	Valley Center, California, United States	Light Heavyweight debut; for the Xplode FS Light Heavyweight Championship.
Win	15–6	Travis McCullough	Submission (rear-naked choke)	Xplode Fighting Series: Brutal Conduct	January 21, 2012	1	2:11	Valley Center, California, United States	
Win	14–6	Ryan Trotter	Submission (rear-naked choke)	Xplode Fight Series: Rumble off the Reservation	August 6, 2011	1	1:22	Valley Center, California, United States	
Loss	13–6	Melvin Costa	TKO (punches)	Gladiator Challenge: Royal Flush	October 24, 2010	2	0:16	San Jacinto, California, United States	Middleweight debut.
Loss	13–5	Luigi Fioravanti	Decision (unanimous)	UFC: Fight for the Troops	December 10, 2008	3	5:00	Fayetteville, North Carolina, United States	Catchweight (174 lbs) bout; Farber missed weight.
Loss	13–4	Rory Markham	KO (head kick)	UFC: Silva vs. Irvin	July 19, 2008	1	1:37	Las Vegas, United States	
Win	13–3	Eduardo Gonzalez	TKO (punches)	MMAX 18: MMA Xtreme 18	January 26, 2008	1	0:27	Tijuana, Mexico	
Win	12–3	Miguel Carrasco	Submission (triangle choke)	MMAX 16: MMA Xtreme 16	November 18, 2007	1	2:10	Mexico City, Mexico	
Win	11–3	Francisco Rosas	Submission (rear-naked choke)	MMAX 11: MMA Xtreme 11	April 21, 2007	1	0:45	Mexico	
Win	10–3	Raul Alcala	TKO (punches)	MMAX 7: MMA Xtreme 7	November 11, 2006	1	0:23	Tijuana, Mexico	
Win	9–3	Nestor Martinez	Submission (rear naked choke)	MMAX 4: MMA Xtreme 4	August 19, 2006	1	0:42	Tijuana, Mexico	
Win	8–3	Stacy Hakes	TKO (punches)	MMAX 4: MMA Xtreme 4	August 19, 2006	1		Tijuana, Mexico	
Loss	7–3	Brian Warren	Submission (triangle choke)	PF 1: The Beginning	May 12, 2006	2		Hollywood, California, United States	
Win	7–2	John Wood	Submission (guillotine choke)	WEF: Sin City	May 20, 2005	1		Las Vegas, Nevada, United States	
Win	6–2	José Ramos	Submission (rear-naked choke)	TC 8: Total Combat 8	April 2, 2005	1	0:33	Tijuana, Mexico	
Loss	5–2	Sean Sherk	Submission (guillotine choke)	SF 6: Battleground in Reno	September 23, 2004	1	0:55	Reno, Nevada, United States	
Win	5–1	Hans Marrero	Decision (split)	RITC 64: Heart & Soul	August 7, 2004	3	3:00	Phoenix, Arizona, US	
Win	4–1	Robert Maldonado	TKO (punches)	RITC 63: It's Time	June 12, 2004	1	1:47	Phoenix, Arizona, US	
Win	3–1	Gabriel Casillas	Decision (unanimous)	RITC 49: Stare Down	June 7, 2003	3	3:00	Phoenix, Arizona, US	
Loss	2–1	Bret Bergmark	TKO (punches)	WEC 6: Return of a Legend	March 27, 2003	1	3:57	Lemoore, California, United States	
Win	2–0	Rich Moss	Submission (keylock)	RITC 45: Finally	March 1, 2003	1	1:26	Phoenix, Arizona, US	
Win	1–0	Hector Figueroa	Submission (guillotine choke)	RM 2: Reto Maximo 2	December 8, 2002	1	4:15	Tijuana, Mexico	

== See also ==
- List of male mixed martial artists
