= Corey Hill =

American mixed martial artist (1978–2015)

- Born: October 3, 1978; Martinsburg, West Virginia, United States
- Died: May 15, 2015 (aged 36); Tampa, Florida, United States
- Other names: The Real Deal
- Height: 6 ft 4 in (1.93 m)
- Weight: 167 lb (76 kg; 11.9 st)
- Division: Lightweight; Welterweight
- Reach: 80 in (203 cm)
- Fighting out of: Brooksville, Florida, United States
- Team: TCH MMA; KO Evolution

Mixed martial arts record
- Total: 15
- Wins: 6
- By knockout: 2
- By submission: 3
- By decision: 1
- Losses: 9
- By knockout: 3
- By submission: 3
- By decision: 3

Other information
- Mixed martial arts record from Sherdog

Corey Cornelius Hill (October 3, 1978 – May 15, 2015) was an American mixed martial artist. In high school in Florida he won state wrestling championships on multiple occasions and was a two-time national finalist college wrestler.

== Mixed martial arts career ==
=== The Ultimate Fighter ===
Hill competed as a lightweight on The Ultimate Fighter 5 television series. During tryouts and production of the show, he told the UFC that his record was 10–0, but it was actually 2–0, both wins from amateur bouts. His first professional fight (albeit technically an exhibition) was on the show. It was scheduled against Gabe Ruediger, but he was expelled from the show for failure to make weight. Instead, Hill's match was against Rob Emerson and he won by a very controversial unanimous decision after three rounds. After defeating Emerson by decision in the preliminaries of TUF 5, Hill went on to lose in the quarterfinals by a triangle choke in the first round to fellow Team Pulver teammate, and future TUF 5 champion, Nate Diaz. Although he lost, Hill's performance validated the comments made several weeks prior by guest coach Jeremy Horn on Episode 3 of TUF 5, who suggested Hill had the potential to be a dominating force in the UFC Lightweight division—even going so far as to offer to train Hill after his run on the show.

=== Ultimate Fighting Championship ===
In his UFC debut at UFC Fight Night 12, Corey Hill defeated Joe Veres with a second-round TKO. Hill followed up with an appearance at UFC 86 against former ICON Sport Lightweight champion Justin Buchholz, who submitted him via rear-naked choke in the second round.

During the UFC: Fight for the Troops event in December 2008, Hill broke his right leg while throwing a kick that was checked by Dale Hartt in what is widely considered one of the most gruesome injuries in mixed martial arts history. Recovery from the injury was expected to take 12–18 months. With regard to organizational support, Hill told Kevin Iole of Yahoo! Sports: "The UFC was awesome throughout this whole thing and was so good to me, I feel indebted to them." His major sponsor, Fighter Warehouse, had paid a bonus and the XFC utilized an event which helped to raise money for the injured UFC fighter.

=== MMA Comeback ===
On January 23, 2010, Hill picked up a unanimous decision victory in his comeback fight against Jason Trzewieczynski just 13 months after his career-threatening leg injury.

On March 20, 2010, Hill lost to Canadian Mark Holst via kimura submission at XKL: Evolution 1. On July 17, 2010, Hill defeated WEC Veteran Kit Cope at Raging Wolf 8: Cage Supremacy via triangle choke submission and on September 9, 2010, Hill lost to former WEC lightweight champion Rob McCullough at Tachi Palace Fights 6 via unanimous decision.

On July 14, 2012, Hill defeated Darryl Madison at Complete Devastation 5 via anaconda choke submission.

=== Xtreme Fighting Championships ===
In November 2011, Hill signed a long term multi-fight contract with XFC.

On December 2, 2011, Hill made his XFC debut getting a first round submission win over Ultimate Fighter alumni Charlie Rader at XFC 15: Tribute.

On December 7, 2012, Hill lost to UFC & Bellator veteran Ryan Thomas at XFC 21: Night of Champions 2 via armbar submission.

== Personal life ==
Hill attended Springstead High School in Spring Hill, Florida. He and his wife Lauran had three children, daughter Seytia and sons Keynan and Corey, Jr. Hill lived in Spring Hill, FL.

Hill also attended Colby Community College in Colby, Kansas, where he was a National champ on a National Championship wrestling team, alongside Daniel Cormier, under coach Steve Lampe.

== Death ==
On May 14, 2015, it was reported that Hill had died after suffering from sudden pneumonia. According to friend Jennifer Swift, he had been diagnosed with pneumonia several weeks prior. It was reported that he underwent a lung transplant, but the lung collapsed. It was also reported that Hill was placed on life support until his family ultimately made the decision to remove him.

Despite a statement from the UFC which claimed that Hill had died, his wife, Lauran Hill, later denied that he had died. She stated: "[Hill] is resting and still alive, and we're praying he makes a full recovery. My husband is fighting for his life. We want him in everyone's prayers." She would not comment on statements made earlier by Hill's close friends and other family members.

Hill died on May 15, 2015, at the age of 36, after suffering a collapsed lung and a heart attack.

== Mixed martial arts record ==
Professional record breakdown
15 matches	6 wins	9 losses
By knockout	2	3
By submission	3	3
By decision	1	3

Res.	Record	Opponent	Method	Event	Date	Round	Time	Location	Notes
Loss	6–9	Jose Caceres	TKO (retirement)	Fight Time 23: Mayhem In Miami	February 6, 2015	1	5:00	Miami, Florida, United States	
Loss	6–8	Marcus Andrusia	TKO (punches)	VFA: Round 4	August 16, 2014	1	3:01	Lake Charles, Louisiana, United States	
Loss	6–7	Eric Calderon	Decision (unanimous)	USFFC 17: Hill vs. Calderon	April 5, 2014	3	5:00	Beaufort, South Carolina, United States	
Loss	6–6	Joe Fye	Decision (unanimous)	Sherman Cage Rage - MMA 4	December 14, 2013	3	5:00	Stroudsburg, Pennsylvania, United States	
Loss	6–5	Ryan Thomas	Submission (armbar)	XFC 21: Night of Champions 2	December 7, 2012	1	2:34	Nashville, Tennessee, United States	
Win	6–4	Darryl Madison	Submission (anaconda choke)	Complete Devastation 5	July 14, 2012	1	1:11	Altoona, Pennsylvania, United States	
Win	5–4	Charlie Rader	Submission (D'arce choke)	XFC 15: Tribute	December 2, 2011	1	3:58	Tampa, Florida, United States	Welterweight debut
Loss	4–4	Rob McCullough	Decision (unanimous)	TPF 6: High Stakes	September 9, 2010	3	5:00	Lemoore, California, United States	
Win	4–3	Kit Cope	Submission (triangle choke)	Raging Wolf 8: Cage Supremacy	July 17, 2010	1	2:30	Salamanca, New York, United States	
Loss	3–3	Mark Holst	Submission (kimura)	XKL: Evolution 1	March 20, 2010	2	4:06	Ypsilanti, Michigan, United States	
Win	3–2	Jason Trzewieczynski	Decision (unanimous)	Raging Wolf 6: Mayhem in the Mist	January 23, 2010	3	5:00	Niagara, New York, United States	
Loss	2–2	Dale Hartt	TKO (leg injury)	UFC: Fight for the Troops	December 10, 2008	2	0:20	Fayetteville, North Carolina, United States	
Loss	2–1	Justin Buchholz	Submission (rear‐naked choke)	UFC 86	July 5, 2008	2	3:57	Las Vegas, Nevada, United States	
Win	2–0	Joe Veres	TKO (punches)	UFC Fight Night 12	January 23, 2008	2	0:37	Las Vegas, Nevada, United States	
Win	1–0	Stryder Fann	TKO (punches)	Kickdown Classic 31	November 18, 2006	1	0:34	Casper, Wyoming, United States	
