= Ryo Chonan =

Japanese mixed martial artist

- Born: October 8, 1976 (age 50); Tsuruoka, Yamagata, Japan
- Other names: Piranha
- Height: 5 ft 9 in (1.75 m)
- Weight: 169 lb (77 kg; 12 st 1 lb)
- Division: Welterweight; Middleweight
- Stance: Orthodox
- Fighting out of: Tsuruoka, Japan
- Team: Tribe Tokyo MMA; Team M.A.D. Team Quest
- Rank: Black belt in Kyokushin karate
- Years active: 2001–2013

Mixed martial arts record
- Total: 35
- Wins: 22
- By knockout: 8
- By submission: 1
- By decision: 13
- Losses: 13
- By knockout: 4
- By submission: 1
- By decision: 8

Other information
- Mixed martial arts record from Sherdog

Ryo Chonan (Japanese: 長南亮, Chōnan Ryō; born October 8, 1976) is a Japanese retired professional mixed martial artist. A professional competitor from 2001 to 2013, Chonan competed for the UFC, PRIDE, DEEP, DREAM, Pancrase, and World Victory Road. Chonan is the former DEEP Middleweight Champion and the former DEEP Welterweight Champion.

== Mixed martial arts career ==
=== Early career ===
Chonan's roots are in Kyokushin, which he began in high school before later moving to Thailand to train. Chonan officially began his professional mixed martial arts career in 2001, losing his first fight in Pancrase – Neo Blood Tournament. He then went on to fight in DEEP, going 6–2 in the organization including a TKO win against Hayato Sakurai.

Chonan fought in PRIDE Bushido 3 as a representative of Team Japan, losing a decision to Ricardo Almeida. Then at PRIDE Bushido 5 he went on to defeat Carlos Newton via unanimous decision.

Chonan's next win was against future UFC Middleweight Champion Anderson Silva at PRIDE: Shockwave 2004, where he executed a spectacular flying scissor-lock takedown, followed quickly by a heel-hook submission.

Chonan returned in DEEP defeating Roan Carneiro via TKO at 18th Impact.

He won his fight at PRIDE Bushido 7 against Nino Schembri via unanimous decision. His next fight was a KO loss against Phil Baroni at PRIDE Bushido 8. He also lost his next fight against future teammate Dan Henderson via KO at the opening seconds of the bout at PRIDE Bushido 9.

He returned at DEEP: 23 Impact to defeat Ryuta Sakurai by TKO to become the DEEP Middleweight Champion.

In the 2006 PRIDE Welterweight Grand Prix, Chonan suffered a broken orbital bone at the end of his match against Joey Villasenor caused by a stomp but was able to continue in the tournament. In his next match of the tournament, against Paulo Filho, Chonan was submitted by armbar early in the first round.

In February 2007, Chonan returned to DEEP and defeated former DEEP Middleweight Champion Ryuta Sakurai to retain the Middleweight Championship.

=== Ultimate Fighting Championship ===
Ryo Chonan made his UFC debut against Karo Parisyan on November 17, 2007, at UFC 78 which Chonan lost via unanimous decision after three rounds.

Chonan then defeated Roan Carneiro in their rematch via split decision on September 6, 2008, at UFC 88.

Chonan was also defeated in his next fight on December 27, 2008, by Brad Blackburn. Blackburn controlled the first two rounds before Chonan was significantly more dominant in the third round. He was unable to finish the fight by T/KO or submission and lost by unanimous decision, 2 rounds to 1.

Chonan is currently a part of the Team Quest, along with former PRIDE Fighting Championships Middleweight and Welterweight Champion Dan Henderson, Matt Lindland, Jason "Mayhem" Miller, and Rameau Thierry Sokoudjou.

Ryo Chonan was subsequently released from the UFC following a controversial split decision loss to T. J. Grant.

=== Return to Japan ===
He won his fight at DEEP : 43 Impact against Jutaro Nakao by unanimous decision.

Chonan made his DREAM debut at DREAM 13 defeating Andrews Nakahara by unanimous decision.

He then made his World Victory Road debut at Soul of Fight on December 30, 2010. Chonan was originally scheduled to face Dan Hornbuckle, but illness forced Hornbuckle off the card and he was replaced by Taisuke Okuno. Chonan lost the fight via KO in the first round.

Chonan returned at DEEP: 54 Impact on June 24, 2011, against Iwase Shigetoshi. Chonan won the fight by knockout.

On October 29, Chonan defeated Naoki Samukawa by unanimous decision.

Chonan returned at Fight For Japan: Genki Desu Ka Omisoka 2011 where he faced Hayato Sakurai. He lost the fight via unanimous decision.

On October 20, 2013, Chonan fought Dan Hornbuckle in his retirement fight. He won the fight by unanimous decision and retired as DEEP Welterweight Champion.

== Championships and accomplishments ==
- DEEP
  - DEEP Middleweight Championship (One time)
  - One successful title defense
  - DEEP Welterweight Championship (One time)
- Sherdog
  - 2004 Submission of the Year- vs. Anderson Silva on December 31
- Sports Illustrated
  - 2000s Best Submission of the Decade- vs. Anderson Silva on December 31, 2004
  - 2000s One Hit Wonder
- Bleacher Report
  - 2000s Submission of the Decade- vs. Anderson Silva on December 31, 2004
- MMA Fighting
  - 2004 Middleweight Fighter of the Year
  - 2004 Submission of the Year- vs. Anderson Silva on December 31

== Mixed martial arts record ==
Professional record breakdown
35 matches	22 wins	13 losses
By knockout	8	4
By submission	1	1
By decision	13	8

Res.	Record	Opponent	Method	Event	Date	Round	Time	Location	Notes
Win	22–13	Dan Hornbuckle	Decision (unanimous)	DEEP: Tribe Tokyo Fight	October 20, 2013	3	5:00	Tokyo, Japan	Won the DEEP Welterweight Championship.
Win	21–13	Seichi Ikemoto	Decision (unanimous)	DEEP: Osaka Impact 2013	April 28, 2013	3	5:00	Osaka, Japan	
Loss	20–13	Hayato Sakurai	Decision (unanimous)	Fight For Japan: Genki Desu Ka Omisoka 2011	December 31, 2011	3	5:00	Saitama, Japan	
Win	20–12	Naoki Samukawa	Decision (unanimous)	Deep: Cage Impact 2011 in Tokyo, 2nd Round	October 29, 2011	3	5:00	Tokyo, Japan	
Win	19–12	Shigetoshi Iwase	KO (punch)	Deep: 54 Impact	June 24, 2011	1	4:45	Tokyo, Japan	
Loss	18–12	Taisuke Okuno	KO (punch)	World Victory Road Presents: Soul of Fight	December 30, 2010	1	0:19	Tokyo, Japan	
Win	18–11	Jun Hee Moon	TKO (punches)	Deep: 50 Impact	October 24, 2010	3	2:57	Tokyo, Japan	
Loss	17–11	Jung Hwan Cha	KO (punches)	Astra	April 25, 2010	2	1:16	Yokohama, Japan	
Win	17–10	Andrews Nakahara	Decision (unanimous)	DREAM 13	Mar 22, 2010	2	5:00	Yokohama, Japan	
Win	16–10	Jutaro Nakao	Decision (unanimous)	Deep: 43 Impact	August 23, 2009	3	5:00	Tokyo, Japan	
Loss	15–10	T. J. Grant	Decision (split)	UFC 97	April 18, 2009	3	5:00	Montreal, Quebec, Canada	
Loss	15–9	Brad Blackburn	Decision (unanimous)	UFC 92	December 27, 2008	3	5:00	Las Vegas, Nevada, United States	
Win	15–8	Roan Carneiro	Decision (split)	UFC 88	September 6, 2008	3	5:00	Atlanta, Georgia, United States	
Loss	14–8	Karo Parisyan	Decision (unanimous)	UFC 78	November 17, 2007	3	5:00	Newark, New Jersey, United States	Vacated DEEP Middleweight Championship.
Win	14–7	Seo Do Wong	TKO (strikes)	DEEP: DEEP in Yamagata	June 24, 2007	1	2:58	Yamagata, Japan	Drops to Welterweight.
Win	13–7	Ryuta Sakurai	Decision (majority)	DEEP: 28 Impact	February 16, 2007	3	5:00	Tokyo, Japan	Defended DEEP Middleweight Championship.
Loss	12–7	Paulo Filho	Submission (armbar)	PRIDE: Bushido 12	August 26, 2006	1	2:30	Nagoya, Japan	PRIDE 2006 Welterweight Grand Prix Quarterfinal.
Win	12–6	Joey Villaseñor	Decision (split)	PRIDE: Bushido 11	June 4, 2006	2	5:00	Saitama, Japan	PRIDE 2006 Welterweight Grand Prix Opening Round.
Win	11–6	Ryuta Sakurai	TKO (doctor stoppage)	DEEP: 23 Impact	February 5, 2006	1	1:57	Tokyo, Japan	Won DEEP Middleweight Championship. Doctor stoppage due to cut.
Loss	10–6	Dan Henderson	KO (punch)	PRIDE: Bushido 9	September 25, 2005	1	0:22	Tokyo, Japan	
Loss	10–5	Phil Baroni	KO (punch)	PRIDE: Bushido 8	July 17, 2005	1	1:40	Nagoya, Japan	
Win	10–4	Nino Schembri	Decision (unanimous)	PRIDE: Bushido 7	May 22, 2005	2	5:00	Tokyo, Japan	
Win	9–4	Roan Carneiro	TKO (doctor stoppage)	DEEP: 18th Impact	February 12, 2005	3	2:15	Tokyo, Japan	Doctor stoppage due to cut.
Win	8–4	Anderson Silva	Submission (flying scissor heel hook)	PRIDE Shockwave 2004	December 31, 2004	3	3:08	Saitama, Japan	MMAFighting Submission of The Year (2004).
Win	7–4	Carlos Newton	Decision (unanimous)	PRIDE Bushido 5	October 14, 2004	2	5:00	Osaka, Japan	
Loss	6–4	Ricardo Almeida	Decision (unanimous)	PRIDE Bushido 3	May 23, 2004	2	5:00	Yokohama, Japan	
Win	6–3	Daijiro Matsui	Decision (majority)	DEEP: 13th Impact	January 22, 2004	3	5:00	Tokyo, Japan	
Win	5–3	Hayato Sakurai	TKO (doctor stoppage)	DEEP: 12th Impact	September 15, 2003	3	2:10	Tokyo, Japan	Doctor stoppage due to cut.
Win	4–3	Yuji Hisamatsu	Decision (majority)	DEEP: 11th Impact	July 13, 2003	3	5:00	Osaka, Japan	
Loss	3–3	Masanori Suda	Decision (split)	DEEP: 7th Impact	December 8, 2002	3	5:00	Tokyo, Japan	
Win	3–2	Katsumi Usuta	TKO (strikes)	DEEP: 6th Impact	September 7, 2002	1	0:05	Tokyo, Japan	
Loss	2–2	Eiji Ishikawa	Decision (majority)	DEEP: 5th Impact	June 9, 2002	2	5:00	Tokyo, Japan	
Win	2–1	Kenji Akiyama	TKO (submission to punches)	DEEP: 4th Impact	March 30, 2002	1	4:22	Nagoya, Japan	
Win	1–1	Takaku Fuke	Decision (unanimous)	DEEP: 3rd Impact	December 23, 2001	3	5:00	Tokyo, Japan	
Loss	0–1	Hikaru Sato	Decision (unanimous)	Pancrase: 2001 Neo-Blood Tournament Eliminations	May 5, 2001	3	5:00	Japan	

== See also ==
- List of male mixed martial artists
