= 2012 in UFC =

Mixed martial arts events

Information
- First date: January 22
- Last date: December 31

Events
- Total events: 32 (1 cancelled)
- UFC: 14 (1 cancelled)
- UFC on Fox: 4
- UFC on FX: 6
- UFC on Fuel TV: 6
- TUF Finale events: 2

Fights
- Total fights: 341
- Title fights: 13

Chronology
2011 in UFC	2012 in UFC	2013 in UFC

The year 2012 was the 20th year in the history of the Ultimate Fighting Championship (UFC), a mixed martial arts promotion based in the United States. 2012 started with UFC 142: Aldo vs. Mendes and ended with UFC 155: dos Santos vs. Velasquez 2. The year saw the successful UFC Featherweight title defense by José Aldo, the crowning of Carlos Condit as the Interim Welterweight Champion, a new Lightweight Champion in Benson Henderson, a tournament to crown the first UFC Flyweight Champion as well as the finales of The Ultimate Fighter 15 and The Ultimate Fighter: Brazil.

== 2012 UFC.com awards ==
2012 UFC.COM Awards
No	Best Fighter	The Upsets	The Submissions	The Newcomers	The Knockouts	The Fights
1	Benson Henderson	Tim Boetsch defeats Héctor Lombard; UFC 149	The Korean Zombie defeats Dustin Poirier; UFC on Fuel TV: The Korean Zombie vs. Poirier	Glover Teixeira	Edson Barboza defeats Terry Etim; UFC 142	Jim Miller defeats Joe Lauzon 1 UFC 155
2	Jon Jones	Ryan Bader defeats Quinton Jackson; UFC 144	Matt Wiman defeats Paul Sass; UFC on Fuel TV: Struve vs. Miocic	Erik Pérez	Cung Le defeats Rich Franklin 2 UFC on Fuel TV: Franklin vs. Le	The Korean Zombie defeats Dustin Poirier; UFC on Fuel TV: The Korean Zombie vs. Poirier
3	Demetrious Johnson	Jamie Varner defeats Edson Barboza; UFC 146	Charles Oliveira defeats Eric Wisely; UFC on Fox: Evans vs. Davis	Max Holloway	Anthony Pettis defeats Joe Lauzon; UFC 144	Eddie Yagin defeats Mark Hominick; UFC 145
4	Matt Brown	Matt Wiman defeats Paul Sass; UFC on Fuel TV: Struve vs. Miocic	Nate Diaz defeats Jim Miller; UFC on Fox: Diaz vs. Miller	Héctor Lombard	Siyar Bahadurzada defeats Paulo Thiago; UFC on Fuel TV: Gustafsson vs. Silva	Benson Henderson defeats Frankie Edgar 1 UFC 144
5	Cain Velasquez	Ricardo Lamas defeats Hatsu Hioki; UFC on FX: Maynard vs. Guida	TJ Waldburger defeats Nick Catone; The Ultimate Fighter 16 Finale	Siyar Bahadurzada	Pat Barry defeats Shane del Rosario; The Ultimate Fighter 16 Finale	Georges St-Pierre defeats Carlos Condit; UFC 154
6	Stefan Struve	C. B. Dollaway defeats Jason Miller; UFC 146	Antônio Rogério Nogueira defeats Dave Herman; UFC 153	John Moraga	Ryan Jimmo defeats Anthony Perosh; UFC 149	Jon Fitch defeats Erick Silva; UFC 153
7	Cub Swanson	Tim Boetsch defeats Yushin Okami; UFC 144	Ivan Menjivar defeats John Albert; UFC on Fuel TV: Sanchez vs. Ellenberger	Myles Jury	Donald Cerrone defeats Melvin Guillard; UFC 150	Demetrious Johnson defeats Joseph Benavidez; UFC 152
8	Mike Pyle	Matt Brown defeats Mike Swick; UFC on Fox: Henderson vs. Diaz	Martin Kampmann defeats Thiago Alves; UFC on FX: Alves vs. Kampmann	Gunnar Nelson	Stephen Thompson defeats Dan Stittgen; UFC 143	Anderson Silva defeats Chael Sonnen 2 UFC 148
9	Anderson Silva	James Head defeats Brian Ebersole; UFC 149	Demian Maia defeats Rick Story; UFC 153	Ryan Jimmo	Mike Pyle defeats Josh Neer; UFC on FX: Johnson vs. McCall 2	James Te Huna defeats Joey Beltran; UFC on Fox: Diaz vs. Miller
10	Costas Philippou	Steven Siler defeats Cole Miller; UFC on FX: Alves vs. Kampmann	Rousimar Palhares defeats Mike Massenzio; UFC 142	Rustam Khabilov	Rustam Khabilov defeats Vinc Pichel; The Ultimate Fighter 16 Finale	Louis Gaudinot defeats John Lineker; UFC on Fox: Diaz vs. Miller
Ref						

== Debut UFC fighters ==
The following fighters fought their first UFC fight in 2012:

ISO	Fighter	Division
(United States)	Abel Trujillo	Lightweight
(Sweden)	Akira Corassani	Featherweight
(United States)	Al Iaquinta	Lightweight
(United States)	Andrew Craig	Middleweight
(England)	Andy Ogle	Featherweight
(Brazil)	Anistavio Medeiros	Lightweight
(Finland)	Anton Kuivanen	Lightweight
(Canada)	Antonio Carvalho	Featherweight
(Brazil)	Antônio Silva	Heavyweight
(Russia)	Azamat Gashimov	Flyweight
(Australia)	Ben Alloway	Welterweight
(Australia)	Bernardo Magalhaes	Lightweight
(Sweden)	Besam Yousef	Welterweight
(England)	Brad Scott	Middleweight
(England)	Brendan Loughnane	Featherweight
(United States)	Brock Jardine	Welterweight
(United States)	Buddy Roberts	Middleweight
(United States)	C.J. Keith	Lightweight
(Brazil)	Caio Magalhaes	Middleweight
(Brazil)	Carlo Prater	Lightweight
(Brazil)	Cezar Ferreira	Middleweight
(United States)	Chad Griggs	Heavyweight
(United States)	Chico Camus	Bantamweight
(Canada)	Chris Clements	Welterweight
(United States)	Chris Saunders	Lightweight
(United States)	Chris Tickle	Featherweight
(United States)	Cody Donovan	Light Heavyweight
(England)	Colin Fletcher	Lightweight
(United States)	Colton Smith	Lightweight
(Brazil)	Cristiano Marcello	Lightweight
(United States)	Dan Stittgen	Welterweight
(United States)	Daniel Pineda	Featherweight
(United States)	Daron Cruickshank	Lightweight
(Brazil)	Delson Heleno	Welterweight
(United States)	Derek Brunson	Middleweight
(Brazil)	Ednaldo Oliveira	Heavyweight
(Japan)	Eiji Mitsuoka	Lightweight
(United States)	Eric Wisely	Featherweight
(Mexico)	Erik Pérez	Bantamweight

ISO	Fighter	Division
(Brazil)	Francisco Trinaldo	Lightweight
(Brazil)	Glover Teixeira	Light Heavyweight
(Brazil)	Godofredo Pepey	Featherweight
(Iceland)	Gunnar Nelson	Welterweight
(Brazil)	Hacran Dias	Featherweight
(Cuba)	Héctor Lombard	Middleweight
(United States)	Henry Martinez	Lightweight
(Brazil)	Hugo Viana	Bantamweight
(United States)	Ian McCall	Flyweight
(Japan)	Issei Tamura	Featherweight
(United States)	Jared Papazian	Bantamweight
(United States)	Jeremy Larsen	Lightweight
(England)	Jimi Manuwa	Light Heavyweight
(United States)	Joe Proctor	Lightweight
(Canada)	Joey Gambino	Featherweight
(United States)	John Cofer	Lightweight
(Brazil)	John Lineker	Bantamweight
(United States)	John Moraga	Flyweight
(Brazil)	John Teixeira	Featherweight
(Norway)	John-Olav Einemo	Heavyweight
(Guam)	Jon Tuck	Lightweight
(Brazil)	Jussier Formiga	Flyweight
(United States)	Justin Lawrence	Featherweight
(United States)	Justin Salas	Lightweight
(Russia)	Khabib Nurmagomedov	Lightweight
(United States)	Lavar Johnson	Heavyweight
(Brazil)	Leonardo Mafra	Lightweight
(Sweden)	Magnus Cedenblad	Middleweight
(United States)	Manuel Rodriguez	Lightweight
(Brazil)	Marcelo Guimarães	Welterweight
(Brazil)	Marcos Vinicius	Bantamweight
(United States)	Marcus LeVesseur	Lightweight
(United States)	Max Holloway	Featherweight
(Venezuela)	Maximo Blanco	Featherweight
(United States)	Michael Chiesa	Lightweight
(Netherlands)	Michael Kuiper	Middleweight
(Canada)	Mike Ricci	Lightweight
(United States)	Mike Rio	Lightweight
(England)	Mike Wilkinson	Featherweight

ISO	Fighter	Division
(Brazil)	Milton Vieira	Featherweight
(Canada)	Mitch Gagnon	Bantamweight
(Japan)	Motonobu Tezuka	Bantamweight
(United States)	Myles Jury	Featherweight
(Canada)	Nick Denis	Bantamweight
(Canada)	Nick Penner	Light Heavyweight
(Northern Ireland)	Norman Parke	Lightweight
(England)	Oli Thompson	Heavyweight
(United States)	Pat Schilling	Featherweight
(England)	Phil Harris	Flyweight
(Brazil)	Renee Forte	Lightweight
(Sweden)	Reza Madadi	Lightweight
(Australia)	Robert Whittaker	Welterweight
(Brazil)	Rodrigo Damm	Lightweight
(Brazil)	Rony Mariano Bezerra	Featherweight
(Russia)	Rustam Khabilov	Lightweight
(Canada)	Ryan Jimmo	Light Heavyweight
(United States)	Sam Sicilia	Featherweight
(Brazil)	Sergio Moraes	Middleweight
(United States)	Shane del Rosario	Heavyweight
(United States)	Shawn Jordan	Heavyweight
(Norway)	Simeon Thoresen	Welterweight
(Afghanistan)	Siyar Bahadurzada	Welterweight
(United States)	Stephen Thompson	Welterweight
(Brazil)	Thiago Perpétuo	Middleweight
(United States)	Tim Elliott	Flyweight
(United States)	Tim Means	Lightweight
(United States)	Tom DeBlass	Light Heavyweight
(England)	Tom Watson	Middleweight
(United States)	Tommy Hayden	Lightweight
(United States)	Ulysses Gomez	Flyweight
(United States)	Vinc Pichel	Lightweight
(Brazil)	Wagner Campos	Lightweight
(Brazil)	Wagner Prado	Light Heavyweight
(United States)	Yaotzin Meza	Featherweight
(Japan)	Yasuhiro Urushitani	Flyweight
(Cuba)	Yoislandy Izquierdo	Lightweight

== The Ultimate Fighter ==
Season	Finale	Division	Winner	Runner-up
TUF 15: Live	Jun 1, 2012	Lightweight	Michael Chiesa	Al Iaquinta
TUF: Brazil	Jun 23, 2012	Featherweight	Rony Mariano Bezerra	Godofredo Pepey
TUF: Brazil	Jun 23, 2012	Middleweight	Cezar Ferreira	Sergio Moraes
TUF 16: Team Carwin vs. Team Nelson	Dec 15, 2012	Welterweight	Colton Smith	Mike Ricci
TUF: The Smashes	Dec 15, 2012	Lightweight	Norman Parke	Colin Fletcher
TUF: The Smashes	Dec 15, 2012	Welterweight	Robert Whittaker	Brad Scott

== Title fights ==
Title fights in 2012
Weight class				Method	Round	Time	Event	Notes
Featherweight	José Aldo (c)	def.	Chad Mendes	KO (knee)	1	4:59	UFC 142	(Note: For the UFC Featherweight Championship.)
Welterweight	Carlos Condit	def.	Nick Diaz	Decision (unanimous) (49–46, 48–47, 49–46)	5	5:00	UFC 143	(Note: For the interim UFC Welterweight Championship.)
Lightweight	Benson Henderson	def.	Frankie Edgar (c)	Decision (unanimous) (49–46, 48–47, 49–46)	5	5:00	UFC 144	(Note: For the UFC Lightweight Championship.)
Light Heavyweight	Jon Jones (c)	def.	Rashad Evans	Decision (unanimous) (49–46, 49–46, 50–45)	5	5:00	UFC 145	(Note: For the UFC Light Heavyweight Championship.)
Heavyweight	Junior dos Santos (c)	def.	Frank Mir	TKO (punches)	2	3:04	UFC 146	(Note: For the UFC Heavyweight Championship.)
Middleweight	Anderson Silva (c)	def.	Chael Sonnen	TKO (knee and punches)	2	1:55	UFC 148	(Note: For the UFC Middleweight Championship.)
Bantamweight	Renan Barão	def.	Urijah Faber	Decision (unanimous) (49–46, 50–45, 49–46)	5	5:00	UFC 149	(Note: For the interim UFC Bantamweight Championship.)
Lightweight	Benson Henderson (c)	def.	Frankie Edgar	Decision (split) (48–47, 48–47, 46–49)	5	5:00	UFC 150	(Note: For the UFC Lightweight Championship.)
Flyweight	Demetrious Johnson	def.	Joseph Benavidez	Decision (split) (48–47, 47–48, 49–46)	5	5:00	UFC 152	(Note: For the inaugural UFC Flyweight Championship.)
Light Heavyweight	Jon Jones (c)	def.	Vitor Belfort	Submission (americana)	4	0:54	UFC 152	(Note: For the UFC Light Heavyweight Championship.)
Welterweight	Georges St-Pierre (c)	def.	Carlos Condit (ic)	Decision (unanimous) (49–46, 50–45, 50–45)	5	5:00	UFC 154	(Note: For the UFC Welterweight Championship.)
Lightweight	Benson Henderson (c)	def.	Nate Diaz	Decision (unanimous) (50–43, 50–45, 50–45)	5	5:00	UFC on Fox 5	(Note: For the UFC Lightweight Championship.)
Heavyweight	Cain Velasquez	def.	Junior dos Santos (c)	Decision (unanimous) (50–45, 50–43, 50–44)	5	5:00	UFC 155	(Note: For the UFC Heavyweight Championship.)

== Events list ==
#	Event	Date	Venue	Location	Attendance
224	UFC 155: dos Santos vs. Velasquez 2	Dec 29, 2012	MGM Grand Garden Arena	Las Vegas, Nevada, U.S.	13,561
223	The Ultimate Fighter: Team Carwin vs. Team Nelson Finale	Dec 15, 2012	Hard Rock Hotel and Casino	Las Vegas, Nevada, U.S.	2,500
222	UFC on FX: Sotiropoulos vs. Pearson	Dec 15, 2012	Gold Coast Convention and Exhibition Centre	Gold Coast, Australia	5,133
221	UFC on Fox: Henderson vs. Diaz	Dec 8, 2012	KeyArena	Seattle, Washington, U.S.	14,387
220	UFC 154: St-Pierre vs. Condit	Nov 17, 2012	Bell Centre	Montreal, Quebec, Canada	17,249
219	UFC on Fuel TV: Franklin vs. Le	Nov 10, 2012	CotaiArena	Macau, SAR, China	8,415
218	UFC 153: Silva vs. Bonnar	Oct 13, 2012	HSBC Arena	Rio de Janeiro, Brazil	16,844
217	UFC on FX: Browne vs. Bigfoot	Oct 5, 2012	Target Center	Minneapolis, Minnesota, U.S.	7,049
216	UFC on Fuel TV: Struve vs. Miocic	Sep 29, 2012	Capital FM Arena	Nottingham, England, U.K.	7,241
215	UFC 152: Jones vs. Belfort	Sep 22, 2012	Air Canada Centre	Toronto, Ontario, Canada	16,800
–	UFC 151: Jones vs. Henderson	Sep 1, 2012	Mandalay Bay Events Center	Las Vegas, Nevada, U.S.	Cancelled
214	UFC 150: Henderson vs. Edgar II	Aug 11, 2012	Pepsi Center	Denver, Colorado, U.S.	13,027
213	UFC on Fox: Shogun vs. Vera	Aug 4, 2012	Staples Center	Los Angeles, California, U.S.	16,080
212	UFC 149: Faber vs. Barão	Jul 21, 2012	Scotiabank Saddledome	Calgary, Alberta, Canada	16,089
211	UFC on Fuel TV: Munoz vs. Weidman	Jul 11, 2012	HP Pavilion	San Jose, California, U.S.	4,250
210	UFC 148: Silva vs. Sonnen II	Jul 7, 2012	MGM Grand Garden Arena	Las Vegas, Nevada, U.S.	15,104
209	UFC 147: Silva vs. Franklin II	Jun 23, 2012	Mineirinho Arena	Belo Horizonte, Brazil	16,643
208	UFC on FX: Maynard vs. Guida	Jun 22, 2012	Revel Casino Hotel	Atlantic City, New Jersey, U.S.	4,652
207	UFC on FX: Johnson vs. McCall	Jun 8, 2012	BankAtlantic Center	Sunrise, Florida, U.S.	6,635
206	The Ultimate Fighter: Live Finale	Jun 1, 2012	Palms Casino Resort	Las Vegas, Nevada, U.S.	1,628
205	UFC 146: dos Santos vs. Mir	May 26, 2012	MGM Grand Garden Arena	Las Vegas, Nevada, U.S.	14,674
204	UFC on Fuel TV: Korean Zombie vs. Poirier	May 15, 2012	Patriot Center	Fairfax, Virginia, U.S.	6,668
203	UFC on Fox: Diaz vs. Miller	May 5, 2012	IZOD Center	East Rutherford, New Jersey, U.S.	10,788
202	UFC 145: Jones vs. Evans	Apr 21, 2012	Philips Arena	Atlanta, Georgia, U.S.	15,545
201	UFC on Fuel TV: Gustafsson vs. Silva	Apr 14, 2012	Ericsson Globe Arena	Stockholm, Sweden	15,428
200	UFC on FX: Alves vs. Kampmann	Mar 3, 2012	Allphones Arena	Sydney, Australia	14,537
199	UFC 144: Edgar vs. Henderson	Feb 26, 2012	Saitama Super Arena	Saitama, Japan	21,000
198	UFC on Fuel TV: Sanchez vs. Ellenberger	Feb 15, 2012	Omaha Civic Auditorium	Omaha, Nebraska, U.S.	7,120
197	UFC 143: Diaz vs. Condit	Feb 4, 2012	Mandalay Bay Events Center	Las Vegas, Nevada, U.S.	9,015
196	UFC on Fox: Evans vs. Davis	Jan 28, 2012	United Center	Chicago, Illinois, U.S.	16,963
195	UFC on FX: Guillard vs. Miller	Jan 20, 2012	Bridgestone Arena	Nashville, Tennessee, U.S.	7,728
194	UFC 142: Aldo vs. Mendes	Jan 14, 2012	HSBC Arena	Rio de Janeiro, Brazil	10,605

== UFC on Fox: Evans vs. Davis ==
UFC on Fox: Evans vs. Davis
- The poster for UFC on Fox: Evans vs. Davis
- Promotion: Ultimate Fighting Championship
- Date: January 28, 2012
- Venue: United Center
- City: Chicago, Illinois
- Attendance: 16,963
- Total gate: $1,270,960

Event chronology
UFC on FX: Guillard vs. Miller	UFC on Fox: Evans vs. Davis	UFC 143: Diaz vs. Condit

UFC on Fox: Evans vs. Davis (also known as UFC on Fox 2) was a mixed martial arts event held by the Ultimate Fighting Championship on January 28, 2012, at the United Center in Chicago, Illinois.

=== Background ===
The event was the first to be broadcast on Fox as part of a seven-year agreement between the UFC and the network and the second to air live on Fox after the inaugural UFC on Fox: Velasquez vs. Dos Santos.

A bout between Demetrious Johnson and Eddie Wineland was originally slated for this event. However, Johnson was pulled from the bout to be a participant in the UFC's Flyweight tournament set to begin in March. Wineland was then expected to face Johnny Bedford at this event. However, Wineland himself was forced out of the bout with an injury and replaced by promotional newcomer Mitch Gagnon. Then just days before the event, the bout was cancelled due to an alleged visa issue for Gagnon.

Paul Sass was expected to face Evan Dunham, but was forced from the bout with an injury and replaced by Nik Lentz.

Cody McKenzie was expected to face Michael Johnson at the event, but was forced from the bout with an injury and replaced by Shane Roller.

Mark Muñoz was expected to face Chael Sonnen in a #1 contender's bout for a middleweight title shot, but Munoz was forced out of the bout with an injury. Michael Bisping, who was pulled from a scheduled fight with Demian Maia, replaced Munoz to face Sonnen in the #1 contender's bout. Chris Weidman would step in on 11 days notice to face Maia as Bisping's replacement.

The preliminary bout between Chris Camozzi and Dustin Jacoby was not aired on television or Facebook, making it the first bout on a UFC card to go unaired on the event's live broadcast since UFC Fight Night: Nogueira vs. Davis in March 2011.

The event averaged 4.7 million viewers with a ratings peak of 6 million viewers for the main event.

=== Results ===
Main card (Fox)
Weight class				Method	Round	Time	Notes
Light Heavyweight	Rashad Evans	def.	Phil Davis	Decision (unanimous) (50–45, 50–45, 50–45)	5	5:00
Middleweight	Chael Sonnen	def.	Michael Bisping	Decision (unanimous) (30–27, 29–28, 29–28)	3	5:00	(Note: UFC Middleweight Championship title eliminator.)
Middleweight	Chris Weidman	def.	Demian Maia	Decision (unanimous) (29–28, 30–27, 29–28)	3	5:00	(Note: Originally incorrectly announced as a split decision.)
Preliminary Card (Fuel TV)
Lightweight	Evan Dunham	def.	Nik Lentz	TKO (doctor stoppage)	2	5:00
Heavyweight	Mike Russow	def.	John-Olav Einemo	Decision (unanimous) (29–28, 29–28, 30–27)	3	5:00
Featherweight	Cub Swanson	def.	George Roop	TKO (punches)	2	2:22
Featherweight	Charles Oliveira	def.	Eric Wisely	Submission (reverse calf slicer)	1	1:43
Lightweight	Michael Johnson	def.	Shane Roller	Decision (unanimous) (29–28, 29–28, 29–28)	3	5:00
Heavyweight	Lavar Johnson	def.	Joey Beltran	KO (punches)	1	4:24
Preliminary Card
Middleweight	Chris Camozzi	def.	Dustin Jacoby	Submission (guillotine choke)	3	1:08

=== Bonus awards ===
The following fighters received $65,000 bonuses.

- Fight of the Night: Evan Dunham vs. Nik Lentz
- Knockout of the Night: Lavar Johnson
- Submission of the Night: Charles Oliveira

== UFC on Fuel TV: Sanchez vs. Ellenberger ==
UFC on Fuel TV: Sanchez vs. Ellenberger
- The poster for UFC on Fuel TV: Sanchez vs. Ellenberger
- Promotion: Ultimate Fighting Championship
- Date: February 15, 2012
- Venue: Omaha Civic Auditorium
- City: Omaha, Nebraska
- Attendance: 6,283
- Total gate: $405,895

Event chronology
UFC 143: Diaz vs. Condit	UFC on Fuel TV: Sanchez vs. Ellenberger	UFC 144: Edgar vs. Henderson

UFC on Fuel TV: Sanchez vs. Ellenberger (also known as UFC on Fuel TV 1), was the first UFC event to air exclusively on Fuel TV. It was held on February 15, 2012, at the Omaha Civic Auditorium in Omaha, Nebraska. At the time, the event was the most watched show ever aired on Fuel TV with 217,000 viewers tuning in.

=== Background ===
The main event consisted of Diego Sanchez facing Jake Ellenberger. Ellenberger came into the match on a five fight win streak, four of which ended by stoppage, including one against Jake Shields. The fight against Ellenberger would be Sanchez's seventeenth fight with the UFC going back to April 2005 when he won The Ultimate Fighter 1. Ellenberger continued his win streak defeating Sanchez by unanimous decision.

Rani Yahya was expected to face Jonathan Brookins at the event. However, Yahya was forced out of the bout with an injury and replaced by Vagner Rocha.

Promotional newcomers Yoislandy Izquierdo and Bernardo Magalhaes were expected to face each other at the event. However, Izquierdo was not allowed to compete due to a contractual dispute with another organization and was replaced by Tim Means.

A bout between Buddy Roberts and Sean Loeffler was scheduled for the preliminary card. However, the pairing was scrapped on the day of the event as Loeffler injured his ankle during a pre-fight warm up. With the loss of the Roberts/Loeffler bout, the event took place with only nine fights, making it the smallest fight card for the promotion since UFC 110 in 2010.

=== Results ===
Main Card (Fuel TV)
Weight class				Method	Round	Time	Notes
Welterweight	Jake Ellenberger	def.	Diego Sanchez	Decision (unanimous) (29–28, 29–28, 29–28)	3	5:00
Heavyweight	Stefan Struve	def.	Dave Herman	TKO (punches)	2	3:52
Middleweight	Ronny Markes	def.	Aaron Simpson	Decision (split) (29–28, 28–29, 29–28)	3	5:00
Heavyweight	Stipe Miocic	def.	Phil De Fries	KO (punches)	1	0:43
Bantamweight	T.J. Dillashaw	def.	Walel Watson	Decision (unanimous) (30–25, 30–25, 30–26)	3	5:00
Bantamweight	Ivan Menjivar	def.	John Albert	Submission (rear-naked choke)	1	3:45
Preliminary card (Facebook)
Featherweight	Jonathan Brookins	def.	Vagner Rocha	KO (punches)	1	1:32	(Note: This bout aired on the broadcast following the Markes vs Simpson bout.)
Lightweight	Justin Salas	def.	Anton Kuivanen	Decision (unanimous) (30–27, 30–27, 29–28)	3	5:00
Lightweight	Tim Means	def.	Bernardo Magalhaes	Decision (unanimous) (30–27, 30–26, 30–26)	3	5:00

=== Bonus awards ===
The following fighters received $50,000 bonuses.

- Fight of the Night: Diego Sanchez vs. Jake Ellenberger
- Knockout of the Night: Stipe Miocic
- Submission of the Night: Ivan Menjivar

== UFC on Fuel TV: The Korean Zombie vs. Poirier ==
UFC on Fuel TV: The Korean Zombie vs. Poirier
- The poster for UFC on Fuel TV: The Korean Zombie vs. Poirier
- Promotion: Ultimate Fighting Championship
- Date: May 15, 2012
- Venue: Patriot Center
- City: Fairfax, Virginia
- Attendance: 6,668
- Total gate: $343,175

Event chronology
UFC on Fox: Diaz vs. Miller	UFC on Fuel TV: The Korean Zombie vs. Poirier	UFC 146: dos Santos vs. Mir

UFC on Fuel TV: The Korean Zombie vs. Poirier (also known as UFC on Fuel TV 3) was a mixed martial arts event held by the Ultimate Fighting Championship on May 15, 2012, at the Patriot Center in Fairfax, Virginia. Initially, this event was referred to as UFC on FX 3, but was since clarified to be a Fuel TV event.

=== Background ===
Brandon Vera was briefly scheduled to face Thiago Silva in a rematch of their January 2011 bout. However, Vera was forced out of the bout with an injury. Igor Pokrajac stepped in to fight Silva. Silva was subsequently pulled from the bout to replace an injured Antônio Rogério Nogueira against Alexander Gustafsson at UFC on Fuel TV: Gustafsson vs. Silva. Pokrajac will now face Fabio Maldonado.

Yves Edwards was expected to face Donald Cerrone at the event, but Edwards was forced out of the bout with an injury and replaced by Jeremy Stephens.

Mike Easton was expected to face Yves Jabouin at the event, but Easton was forced out of the bout with an injury and replaced by Jeff Hougland who was previously expected to face Renan Barão at UFC 148.

Aaron Riley was expected to face Cody McKenzie at the event, but Riley was pulled from the event and replaced by promotional newcomer Marcus LeVesseur.

Azamat Gashimov was expected to make his promotional debut against Alex Soto. However, Gashimov was forced out of the bout with an injury and replaced by returning veteran Francisco Rivera.

The main event featured Chan Sung Jung facing Dustin Poirier. The winner of this bout was linked to a potential bout with José Aldo for the UFC Featherweight Championship, but that fight did not materialize until 15 months later at UFC 163.

=== Results ===
Main Card (Fuel TV)
Weight class				Method	Round	Time	Notes
Featherweight	Chan Sung Jung	def.	Dustin Poirier	Technical Submission (D'Arce choke)	4	1:07
Welterweight	Amir Sadollah	def.	Jorge Lopez	Decision (split) (28–29, 29–28, 29–28)	3	5:00
Lightweight	Donald Cerrone	def.	Jeremy Stephens	Decision (unanimous) (30–27, 30–27, 30–27)	3	5:00
Bantamweight	Yves Jabouin	def.	Jeff Hougland	Decision (unanimous) (30–27, 30–26, 30–27)	3	5:00
Light Heavyweight	Igor Pokrajac	def.	Fabio Maldonado	Decision (unanimous) (29–28, 30–27, 29–28)	3	5:00
Middleweight	Tom Lawlor	def.	Jason MacDonald	KO (punch)	1	0:50
Preliminary card (Facebook)
Middleweight	Brad Tavares	def.	Yang Dongi	Decision (unanimous) (29–28, 29–28, 29–28)	3	5:00
Lightweight	Cody McKenzie	def.	Marcus LeVesseur	Submission (guillotine choke)	1	3:05
Lightweight	T. J. Grant	def.	Carlo Prater	Decision (unanimous) (30–27, 30–27, 30–27)	3	5:00
Lightweight	Rafael dos Anjos	def.	Kamal Shalorus	Submission (rear-naked choke)	1	1:40
Bantamweight	Johnny Eduardo	def.	Jeff Curran	Decision (unanimous) (29–28, 29–28, 29–28)	3	5:00
Bantamweight	Francisco Rivera	def.	Alex Soto	Decision (unanimous) (30–27, 30–27, 30–27)	3	5:00

=== Bonus awards ===
The following fighters received $40,000 bonuses.

- Fight of the Night: Dustin Poirier vs. Chan-Sung Jung
- Knockout of the Night: Tom Lawlor
- Submission of the Night: Chan-Sung Jung

=== Reported payout ===
The following is the reported payout to the fighters as reported to the Virginia Department of Professional and Occupational Regulation. It does not include sponsor money and also does not include the UFC's traditional "fight night" bonuses.

- Chan Sung Jung: $34,000 (includes $17,000 win bonus) def. Dustin Poirier: $14,000
- Amir Sadollah: $48,000 (includes $24,000 win bonus) def. Jorge Lopez: $6,000
- Donald Cerrone: $60,000 (includes $30,000 win bonus) def. Jeremy Stephens: $24,000
- Yves Jabouin: $20,000 (includes $10,000 win bonus) def. Jeff Hougland: $8,000
- Igor Pokrajac: $34,000 (includes $17,000 win bonus) def. Fabio Maldonado: $11,000
- Tom Lawlor: $24,000 (includes $12,000 win bonus) def. Jason MacDonald: $19,000
- Brad Tavares: $20,000 (includes $10,000 win bonus) def. Dongi Yang: $12,000
- Cody McKenzie: $20,000 (includes $10,000 win bonus) def. Marcus LeVesseur: $6,000
- T. J. Grant: $30,000 (includes $15,000 win bonus) def. Carlo Prater: $10,000
- Rafael dos Anjos: $36,000 (includes $18,000 win bonus) def. Kamal Shalorus: $11,000
- Johnny Eduardo: $12,000 (includes $6,000 win bonus) def. Jeff Curran: $8,000
- Francisco Rivera: $12,000 (includes $6,000 win bonus) def. Alex Soto: $6,000

== UFC on FX: Johnson vs. McCall 2 ==
UFC on FX: Johnson vs. McCall 2
- The poster for UFC on FX: Johnson vs. McCall 2
- Promotion: Ultimate Fighting Championship
- Date: June 8, 2012
- Venue: BankAtlantic Center
- City: Sunrise, Florida
- Attendance: 6,635
- Total gate: $329,110
- Estimated viewers: 1,100,000
- Total purse: $583,500

Event chronology
The Ultimate Fighter: Live Finale	UFC on FX: Johnson vs. McCall 2	UFC on FX: Maynard vs. Guida

UFC on FX: Johnson vs. McCall (also known as UFC on FX 3) was a mixed martial arts event held by the Ultimate Fighting Championship on June 8, 2012, at the BankAtlantic Center in Sunrise, Florida.

=== Background ===
Because of a scoring error at UFC on FX: Alves vs. Kampmann, a majority draw between Demetrious Johnson and Ian McCall was mistakenly announced as a victory for Johnson. Dana White announced the error following the conclusion of the event and that Johnson and McCall would have a rematch. The rematch was initially reported to happen at The Ultimate Fighter 15 Finale, but instead was moved to the main card of this event, UFC on FX 3. Since then, it was announced by the UFC that the fight would be the main event of UFC on FX 3.

This was the first event that the UFC hosted in South Florida since UFC Fight Night 10 in 2007. This also was the first UFC event to be headlined by a flyweight bout.

=== Results ===
Main Card (FX)
Weight class				Method	Round	Time	Notes
Flyweight	Demetrious Johnson	def.	Ian McCall	Decision (unanimous) (29–28, 30–27, 29–28)	3	5:00	(Note: Flyweight tournament semifinal bout.)
Welterweight	Erick Silva	def.	Charlie Brenneman	Submission (rear-naked choke)	1	4:33
Welterweight	Mike Pyle	def.	Josh Neer	KO (punch)	1	4:56
Bantamweight	Eddie Wineland	def.	Scott Jorgensen	KO (punches)	2	4:10
Preliminary card (Fuel TV)
Welterweight	Mike Pierce	def.	Carlos Eduardo Rocha	Decision (unanimous) (30–27, 30–27, 30–27)	3	5:00
Welterweight	Seth Baczynski	def.	Lance Benoist	Decision (split) (27–30, 29–28, 29–28)	3	5:00
Featherweight	Matt Grice	def.	Leonard Garcia	Decision (unanimous) (30–27, 30–27, 30–27)	3	5:00
Bantamweight	Dustin Pague	def.	Jared Papazian	Submission (rear-naked choke)	1	3:21
Lightweight	Tim Means	def.	Justin Salas	TKO (knee & punches)	1	1:06	(Note: This bout aired on the broadcast following the Silva vs Brenneman bout.)
Middleweight	Buddy Roberts	def.	Caio Magalhaes	Decision (unanimous) (30–27, 30–27, 29–28)	3	5:00
Preliminary card (Facebook)
Lightweight	Henry Martinez	def.	Bernardo Magalhaes	Decision (split) (30–27, 28–29, 29–28)	3	5:00
Welterweight	Sean Pierson	def.	Jake Hecht	Decision (unanimous) (29–28, 29–28, 29–28)	3	5:00

=== Flyweight Championship bracket ===
Semifinals; UFC on FX 2 / UFC on FX 3
Joseph Benavidez	TKO
Yasuhiro Urushitani	2
Demetrious Johnson^{1}	UD
Ian McCall	3

Finals; UFC 152
Joseph Benavidez	5
Demetrious Johnson	SD

^{1} The initial semifinal bout between Johnson and McCall at UFC on FX 2 ended in a draw. Johnson defeated McCall in a rematch at UFC on FX 3

=== Bonus awards ===
The following fighters received $40,000.

- Fight of the Night: Eddie Wineland vs. Scott Jorgensen
- Knockout of the Night: Mike Pyle
- Submission of the Night: Erick Silva

=== Reported payout ===
The following is the reported payout to the fighters as reported to the Florida State Boxing Commission. It does not include sponsor money and also does not include the UFC's traditional "fight night" bonuses.

- Demetrious Johnson: $40,000 (includes $20,000 win bonus) def. Ian McCall: $9,000
- Erick Silva: $16,000 (includes $8,000 win bonus) def. Charlie Brenneman: $18,000
- Mike Pyle: $66,000 (includes $33,000 win bonus) def. Josh Neer: $14,000
- Eddie Wineland: $20,000 (includes $10,000 win bonus) def. Scott Jorgensen: $20,500
- Mike Pierce: $40,000 (includes $20,000 win bonus) def. Carlos Eduardo Rocha: $8,000
- Seth Baczynski: $20,000 (includes $10,000 win bonus) def. Lance Benoist: $8,000
- Matt Grice: $12,000 (includes $6,000 win bonus) def. Leonard Garcia: $20,000
- Dustin Pague: $20,000 (includes $10,000 win bonus) def. Jared Papazian: $6,000
- Tim Means: $16,000 (includes $8,000 win bonus) def. Justin Salas: $8,000
- Buddy Roberts: $12,000 (includes $6,000 win bonus) def. Caio Magalhaes: $8,000
- Henry Martinez: $12,000 (includes $6,000 win bonus) def. Bernardo Magalhaes: $8,000
- Sean Pierson: $20,000 (includes $10,000 win bonus) def. Jake Hecht: $8,000

== UFC 149: Faber vs. Barão ==
UFC 149: Faber vs. Barão
- The poster for UFC 149: Faber vs. Barão
- Promotion: Ultimate Fighting Championship
- Date: July 21, 2012
- Venue: Scotiabank Saddledome
- City: Calgary, Alberta, Canada
- Attendance: 16,089
- Total gate: $4,100,000
- Buyrate: 235,000

Event chronology
UFC on Fuel TV: Muñoz vs. Weidman	UFC 149: Faber vs. Barão	UFC on Fox: Shogun vs. Vera

UFC 149: Faber vs. Barão was a mixed martial arts event held by the Ultimate Fighting Championship on July 21, 2012, at the Scotiabank Saddledome in Calgary. It was the first event that the UFC has held in the Canadian province of Alberta.

=== Background ===
On April 24, due to a conflict with the UN Conference, the UFC Middleweight Championship bout between Anderson Silva and Chael Sonnen, which was originally scheduled to main event UFC 147 was moved to UFC 148 to serve as the new main event. Plans were then being made for José Aldo, who at the time was scheduled to defend his title at this event against an undetermined opponent, to headline UFC 147. However it was reported on April 28, 2012, that Aldo would remain on this card and defend his title against Erik Koch.

The bout between Michael Bisping and Tim Boetsch, originally scheduled for UFC 148, was moved to this event to help bolster this (the UFC 149) fight card. However, Bisping was forced out of the bout with an injury and replaced by promotional newcomer Hector Lombard.

Yoshihiro Akiyama was expected to face Thiago Alves at this event, but was forced to pull out of the fight due to injury and replaced by Siyar Bahadurzada. Then on June 1, Alves pulled out of the bout citing an injury and was replaced by Chris Clements. However, Bahadurzada was also forced out of the bout with an injury and replaced by Matthew Riddle.

Thiago Silva was expected to face Maurício Rua at the event. However, Silva was forced out of the bout with an injury and Rua was pulled from the event entirely, and would face Brandon Vera at UFC on Fox 4.

On June 4, 2012, it was announced that the UFC signed former DREAM champion Bibiano Fernandes. He was expected to compete against Roland Delorme. However, a week later it was announced that Fernandes was removed from the event due to injury but was later announced that Fernandes had not signed with the UFC. Francisco Rivera filled in to fight Delorme.

On June 9, 2012, it was announced that UFC featherweight champion, José Aldo was removed from the event due to injury. No replacement has yet been named for his scheduled opponent, Erik Koch. As a result, the UFC Interim Bantamweight Championship fight between Urijah Faber and Renan Barão was rescheduled as the main event of the fight.

George Roop was scheduled to fight Antonio Carvalho, but on June 26, Roop was forced out of the fight and replaced by Daniel Pineda.

Former Pride and Interim UFC Heavyweight Champion Antônio Rodrigo Nogueira was expected to face Cheick Kongo at the event. However, Nogueira pulled out of the bout, citing that an arm injury sustained in his last bout had not healed enough to resume the proper training and was replaced by Shawn Jordan.

Claude Patrick was expected to face James Head at the event. However, Patrick was forced out of the bout with an injury and was replaced by Brian Ebersole.

=== Results ===
Main Card
Weight class				Method	Round	Time	Notes
Bantamweight	Renan Barão	def.	Urijah Faber	Decision (unanimous) (49–46, 50–45, 49–46)	5	5:00	(Note: For the interim UFC Bantamweight Championship.)
Middleweight	Tim Boetsch	def.	Hector Lombard	Decision (split) (28-29, 29–28, 29–28)	3	5:00
Heavyweight	Cheick Kongo	def.	Shawn Jordan	Decision (unanimous) (30-27, 30-27, 30–28)	3	5:00
Welterweight	James Head	def.	Brian Ebersole	Decision (split) (29–28, 28–29, 29–28)	3	5:00
Welterweight	Chris Clements	vs.	Matt Riddle	NC (overturned)	3	2:02	(Note: Originally ruled a Submission (arm-triangle choke) victory for Riddle, result was overturned due to testing positive for marijuana.)
Preliminary Card (FX)
Middleweight	Nick Ring	def.	Court McGee	Decision (unanimous) (29–28, 29–28, 29–28)	3	5:00
Bantamweight	Francisco Rivera	vs.	Roland Delorme	No Contest	1	4:19	(Note: Originally ruled a KO victory for Rivera, result was overturned due to testing positive for a banned substance.)
Light Heavyweight	Ryan Jimmo	def.	Anthony Perosh	KO (punch)	1	0:07
Bantamweight	Bryan Caraway	def.	Mitch Gagnon	Submission (rear-naked choke)	3	1:39
Preliminary Card (Facebook)
Featherweight	Antonio Carvalho	def.	Daniel Pineda	KO (punches)	1	1:11
Lightweight	Anton Kuivanen	def.	Mitch Clarke	Decision (split) (29–28, 28–29, 29–28)	3	5:00

=== Bonus awards ===
The following fighters received $65,000 bonuses.

- Fight of the Night: Bryan Caraway vs. Mitch Gagnon
- Knockout of the Night: Ryan Jimmo
- Submission of the Night: Matthew Riddle

== See also ==
- UFC
- List of UFC champions
- List of UFC events
