= UFC on FX: Browne vs. Bigfoot =

UFC mixed martial arts event in 2012

- The poster for UFC on FX: Browne vs. Bigfoot
- Promotion: Ultimate Fighting Championship
- Date: October 5, 2012
- Venue: Target Center
- City: Minneapolis, Minnesota
- Attendance: 7,049
- Total gate: $358,000
- Estimated viewers: 1,100,000

Event chronology
UFC on Fuel TV: Struve vs. Miocic	UFC on FX: Browne vs. Bigfoot	UFC 153: Silva vs. Bonnar

UFC on FX: Browne vs. Bigfoot (also known as UFC on FX 5) was a mixed martial arts event held by the Ultimate Fighting Championship on October 5, 2012, at the Target Center in Minneapolis, Minnesota. It was the fifth UFC event broadcast live on FX.

== Background ==
The event was originally expected to take place on September 7, 2012 at Bankers Life Fieldhouse in Indianapolis, Indiana.

Louis Gaudinot was expected to face Darren Uyenoyama at the event; however, Gaudinot was forced out of the bout with an injury and replaced by promotional newcomer Phil Harris.

A bout between Rob Broughton and Matt Mitrione, originally scheduled for UFC on Fox: Shogun vs. Vera and then briefly linked to this event, was scrapped after Broughton was forced out of the bout for a second time.

As a result of the cancellation of UFC 151, bouts between Jake Ellenberger vs. Jay Hieron, Danny Castillo vs. Michael Johnson, Shane Roller vs. Jacob Volkmann and Dennis Hallman vs. Thiago Tavares were rescheduled for this event.

The fight between John Dodson and Jussier Formiga was a title elimination bout with the winner being the first man to challenge the newly crowned UFC Flyweight champion, Demetrious Johnson.

A bout between Dennis Hallman and Thiago Tavares was expected to take place at this event; however, UFC officials cancelled the fight before the fighters stepped on the scale, because Hallman had missed weight significantly. Hallman was reportedly paid his show and win money, but was released from the organization.

Jeremy Stephens and Yves Edwards were scheduled to fight on this card, but the bout was cancelled due to Stephens being arrested on the day of the event for an assault charge that dates back to 2011.

== Results ==
Main Card (FX)
Weight class				Method	Round	Time	Notes
Heavyweight	Antônio Silva	def.	Travis Browne	TKO (punches)	1	3:27
Welterweight	Jake Ellenberger	def.	Jay Hieron	Decision (unanimous) (29–28, 29–28, 29–28)	3	5:00
Flyweight	John Dodson	def.	Jussier Formiga	TKO (punches)	2	4:35	(Note: UFC Flyweight Championship title eliminator.)
Welterweight	Justin Edwards	def.	Josh Neer	Technical Submission (guillotine choke)	1	0:45
Preliminary Card (Fuel TV)
Lightweight	Michael Johnson	def.	Danny Castillo	KO (punches)	2	1:06	(Note: This bout aired on the broadcast following the Dodson vs Formiga bout.)
Welterweight	Mike Pierce	def.	Aaron Simpson	KO (punches)	2	0:29
Lightweight	Marcus LeVesseur	def.	Carlo Prater	Decision (split) (28–29, 29–28, 29–28)	3	5:00
Lightweight	Jacob Volkmann	def.	Shane Roller	Submission (rear-naked choke)	1	2:38
Featherweight	Diego Nunes	def.	Bart Palaszewski	Decision (unanimous) (30–27, 29–28, 30–27)	3	5:00
Flyweight	Darren Uyenoyama	def.	Phil Harris	Submission (rear-naked choke)	2	3:38

== Bonus Awards ==
The following fighters received $40,000 bonuses.

- Fight of the Night: Diego Nunes vs. Bart Palaszewski
- Knockout of the Night: Michael Johnson
- Submission of the Night: Justin Edwards

== Reported Payout ==
The following is the reported payout to the fighters as reported to the Minnesota Office of Combative Sports. It does not include sponsor money and also does not include the UFC's traditional "fight night" bonuses.

- Antonio Silva: $70,000 (no win bonus) def. Travis Browne: $20,000
- Jake Ellenberger: $84,000 (includes $42,000 win bonus) def. Jay Hieron: $12,000
- John Dodson: $30,000 (includes $15,000 win bonus) def. Jussier Formiga: $9,000
- Justin Edwards: $20,000 (includes $10,000 win bonus) def. Josh Neer: $16,000
- Michael Johnson: $28,000 (includes $14,000 win bonus) def. Danny Castillo: $25,000
- Mike Pierce: $44,000 (includes $22,000 win bonus) def. Aaron Simpson: $25,000
- Dennis Hallman: $54,000 vs. Thiago Tavares: $26,000^
- Marcus LeVesseur: $12,000 (includes $6,000 win bonus) def. Carlo Prater: $10,000
- Jacob Volkmann: $40,000 (includes $20,000 win bonus) def. Shane Roller: $25,000
- Diego Nunes: $30,000 (includes $15,000 win bonus) def. Bart Palaszewski: $14,000
- Darren Uyenoyama: $16,000 (includes $8,000 win bonus) def. Phil Harris: $8,000

^Fight did not take place as Hallman missed weight significantly. Both fighters were paid and Hallman was subsequently released from the organization.

== See also ==
- List of UFC events
- 2012 in UFC
