= Marcus LeVesseur =

American mixed martial arts fighter (born 1982)

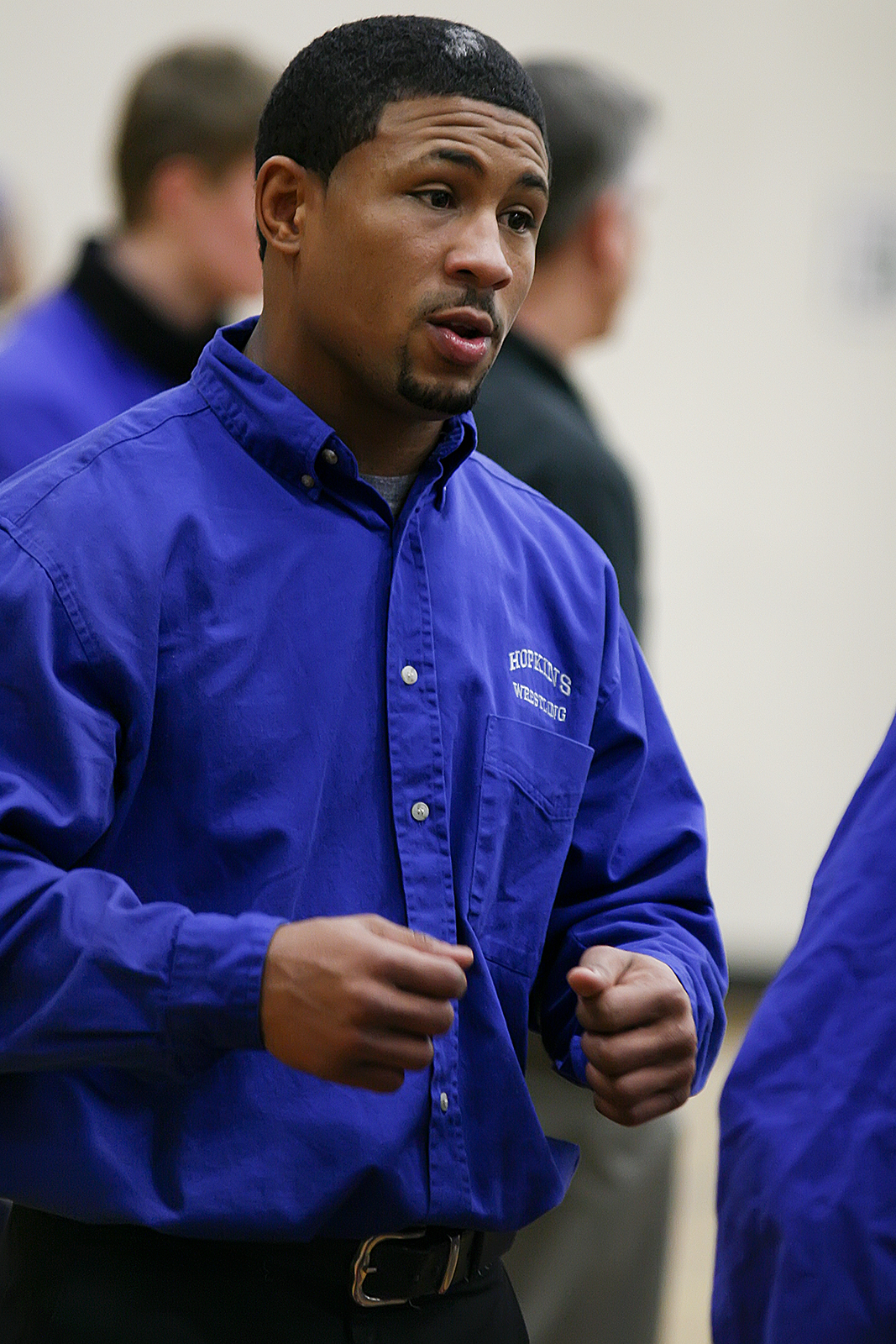
- Marcus LeVesseur in 2009
- Born: July 17, 1982 (age 44); Minneapolis, Minnesota, U.S.
- Other names: The Prospect
- Nationality: American
- Height: 5 ft 9 in (1.75 m)
- Weight: 155.4 lb (70.5 kg)
- Division: Lightweight
- Reach: 70.0 in (178 cm)
- Style: Wrestling
- Fighting out of: Eagan, Minnesota, U.S.
- Team: Minnesota Fight Factory
- Wrestling: NCAA Division III Wrestling
- Years active: 2003-present

Mixed martial arts record
- Total: 29
- Wins: 22
- By knockout: 10
- By submission: 7
- By decision: 5
- Losses: 7
- By knockout: 4
- By submission: 3

Other information
- Mixed martial arts record from Sherdog

Marcus LeVesseur (born July 17, 1982) is a retired American mixed martial artist who competed in the Lightweight division. A professional competitor since 2003, he competed for the UFC and Adrenaline MMA. As a collegiate wrestler, LeVesseur was the only four-time undefeated NCAA Division III National Champion in history, and one of the three to do so across all three NCAA divisions. Only Cael Sanderson of Division I - Iowa State University (159-0), Joey Davis of Division II - Notre Dame College (133-0), and Marcus LeVesseur of Division III - Augsburg University (155-0) have completed their collegiate careers as undefeated, four-time NCAA champions.

== Background ==
Born and raised in Minneapolis, LeVesseur began wrestling at the age of five and went on to become a four-time State Champion at Roosevelt High School, and spent his senior year at Bloomington Kennedy High School. LeVesseur, who was also a talented football player as a quarterback and competed in track and field, had a 141-match win streak heading into college, and holds the high school wrestling state record for most wins, including one over future Olympian and Bellator Welterweight Champion, Ben Askren. LeVesseur, who also excelled academically, was offered a scholarship to compete at the University of Minnesota, but transferred to NCAA Division III Augsburg College before beginning his freshman season for Minnesota. As a college wrestler, LeVesseur was undefeated and untied, with a record of 155–0. He won four NCAA Division III Championships individually, and was a member of two teams that won National Championships. For his performance in 2005, he received the Wade Schalles Award for best collegiate pinner. Since his last loss in high school competition LeVesseur compiled an amateur wrestling record of 296–0 through his senior year at Augsburg. He is only the second college wrestler ever to finish his career unbeaten and untied, with a 155–0 career record (Cael Sanderson was the first with a 159–0 record; Joey Davis has since joined them with a 133-0 record). LeVesseur ended his high school wrestling career 141-match unbeaten streak, which when combined with his unbeaten college career was 296–0. LeVesseur also continued with football at Augsburg, breaking multiple touchdown and rushing records for the conference and school as a quarterback.

== Mixed martial arts career ==
=== Early career ===
LeVesseur made his MMA debut in 2003 against Doug Henkey. He won via KO 44 seconds into round one and went on to compiled a record of 21-5 while competing for regional promotions.

=== Ultimate Fighting Championship ===
In April 2012, LeVesseur signed a four-fight deal with the UFC. He made his debut as a replacement for Aaron Riley against Cody McKenzie on May 15, 2012 at UFC on Fuel TV: Korean Zombie vs. Poirier. He lost the fight via submission in the first round.

LeVesseur defeated Carlo Prater on October 5, 2012 at UFC on FX 5 via split decision.

LeVesseur was expected to face Michael Chiesa on December 8, 2012 at UFC on Fox 5, replacing an injured Rafaello Oliveira. However, the week of the event, Chiesa was forced out of the bout with LeVesseur with an undisclosed illness and the bout was scrapped altogether. Then on the day of the weigh-ins for the event, Tim Means was forced from his bout with Abel Trujillo after sustaining a head injury caused by a fall in a hotel sauna and LeVesseur stepped up to face Trujillo. He lost the fight via TKO in the second round and was subsequently released from the promotion.

== Mixed martial arts record ==
Professional record breakdown
29 matches	22 wins	7 losses
By knockout	10	4
By submission	7	3
By decision	5	0

Res.	Record	Opponent	Method	Event	Date	Round	Time	Location	Notes
Loss	22–7	Abel Trujillo	TKO (knees to the body)	UFC on Fox: Henderson vs. Diaz	December 8, 2012	2	3:56	Seattle, Washington, United States	
Win	22–6	Carlo Prater	Decision (split)	UFC on FX: Browne vs. Bigfoot	October 5, 2012	3	5:00	Minneapolis, Minnesota, United States	
Loss	21–6	Cody McKenzie	Submission (guillotine choke)	UFC on Fuel TV: Korean Zombie vs. Poirier	May 15, 2012	1	3:05	Fairfax, Virginia, United States	
Win	21–5	Taurean Bogguess	Decision (unanimous)	MSC: High Stakes	August 19, 2011	3	5:00	Hinckley, Minnesota, United States	
Win	20–5	Brian Geraghty	TKO (punches)	Seconds Out/Vivid MMA: Combat on Capitol Hill 5	April 15, 2011	1	1:52	St. Paul, Minnesota, United States	
Win	19–5	Dane Sayers	Decision (unanimous)	Showdown at the Sheraton	February 4, 2011	3	5:00	St. Paul, Minnesota, United States	
Loss	18–5	Dakota Cochrane	Submission (triangle choke)	Combat on Capitol Hill 4	November 12, 2010	1	4:08	St. Paul, Minnesota, United States	
Win	18–4	Josh Bumgarner	Submission (rear-naked choke)	Combat on Capitol Hill 3	September 17, 2010	2	4:21	St. Paul, Minnesota, United States	
Win	17–4	Morrison Lamb	TKO (doctor stoppage)	Combat on Capitol Hill 2	July 30, 2010	1	3:43	St. Paul, Minnesota, United States	
Win	16–4	Jay Ellis	KO (punches)	ECO: Extreme Cagefighting Organization 6	July 10, 2010	1	0:53	Wisconsin Dells, Wisconsin, United States	
Loss	15–4	Jason Buck	TKO (punches)	Havoc at the Hyatt II	June 19, 2010	2	4:20	Minneapolis, Minnesota, United States	
Win	15–3	Mike Plazola	Submission (rear-naked choke)	Havoc at the Hyatt	March 27, 2010	1	4:45	Minneapolis, Minnesota, United States	
Win	14–3	Bruce Johnson	Submission (rear-naked choke)	Seconds Out 11/20/09	November 20, 2009	1	2:04	St. Paul, Minnesota, United States	
Win	13–3	Eric Marriott	Decision (unanimous)	Seconds Out 2/13/09	February 13, 2009	3	5:00	Maplewood, Minnesota, United States	
Win	12–3	RT Hicks	KO (punch)	MCS: Minnesota Combat Sports	January 17, 2009	1	0:10	St. Paul, Minnesota, United States	
Loss	11–3	Brian Cobb	Submission (rear-naked choke)	War Gods: Do or Die	November 8, 2008	2	2:35	Fresno, California, United States	
Win	11–2	Ismael Gonzalez	Submission (rear-naked choke)	WG: War Gods	July 26, 2008	2	1:46	Fresno, California, United States	
Win	10–2	Henry King	Submission (rear-naked choke)	MF 4: Max Fights 4	July 19, 2008	1	1:06	Fargo, North Dakota, United States	
Loss	9–2	Tom Belt	TKO (punches)	Adrenaline MMA: Guida vs Russow	June 14, 2008	1	4:10	Chicago, Illinois, United States	
Win	9–1	Johnny Case	KO (punch)	SO: Seconds Out	May 17, 2008	1	0:23	St. Paul, Minnesota, United States	
Win	8–1	Jesse Evans	Submission (rear-naked choke)	MF 3: Max Fights 3	April 26, 2008	1	1:30	Fargo, North Dakota, United States	
Loss	7–1	Derek Abram	TKO (knee injury)	UCS: Battle on the Bay 9	November 30, 2007	1	0:15	Superior, Wisconsin, United States	
Win	7–0	Mike Sanchez	TKO (punches)	FCC 31: Freestyle Combat Challenge 31	November 10, 2007	1	1:23	Kenosha, Wisconsin, United States	
Win	6–0	Richard Silva	Submission (rear-naked choke)	WFC - Downtown Throwdown	September 14, 2007	2	1:42	Minneapolis, Minnesota, United States	
Win	5–0	Josh Marker	TKO (doctor stoppage)	EFX: Fury	May 3, 2007	1	0:38	Minneapolis, Minnesota, United States	
Win	4–0	Billy Walters	KO (punches)	EFX: Fury	November 1, 2006	1	0:51	Minneapolis, Minnesota, United States	
Win	3–0	Jaxson Mason	Decision (unanimous)	EFX: Fury	October 5, 2006	3	5:00	Minneapolis, Minnesota, United States	
Win	2–0	Yancy Cueller	TKO (punches)	EFX: EFX	September 6, 2006	1	0:27	Minneapolis, Minnesota, United States	
Win	1–0	Doug Henkey	KO (punch)	EC: Best of the Best 1	May 10, 2003	1	0:44	Fridley, Minnesota, United States	

== See also ==
- List of male mixed martial artists
