= UFC 150 =

UFC mixed martial arts event in 2012

UFC 150: Henderson vs. Edgar II
- The poster for UFC 150: Henderson vs. Edgar II
- Promotion: Ultimate Fighting Championship
- Date: August 11, 2012
- Venue: Pepsi Center
- City: Denver, Colorado
- Attendance: 13,027
- Total gate: $619,955
- Buyrate: 190,000

Event chronology
UFC on Fox: Shogun vs. Vera	UFC 150: Henderson vs. Edgar II	UFC 151: Jones vs. Henderson

UFC 150: Henderson vs. Edgar II was a mixed martial arts event held by the Ultimate Fighting Championship on August 11, 2012, at the Pepsi Center now known as Ball Arena in Denver, Colorado.

== Background ==
A fight between Dennis Hallman and Thiago Tavares was expected for this card. However, on July 12 it was announced that the fight was moved to the UFC 151 card.

Luiz Cane was expected to face Yushin Okami at this event. However, Cane was forced out of the bout with an injury and replaced by Rousimar Palhares. Palhares himself was forced out of the bout with Okami with an injury and was replaced by Buddy Roberts. Roberts was already on the card, originally scheduled against Chris Camozzi, but Camozzi was also forced off the card with an injury.

At the weigh-ins, Melvin Guillard was the only one of 20 fighters who missed weight. Guillard, who fought former training partner Donald Cerrone, weighed 157.5 pounds on his first try. He was given two hours to cut to the lightweight maximum of 156 pounds, but he elected instead to surrender an undisclosed percentage of his fight purse to Cerrone, who weighed 155 pounds.

== Results ==
Main Card
Weight class				Method	Round	Time	Notes
Lightweight	Benson Henderson (c)	def.	Frankie Edgar	Decision (split) (46–49, 48–47, 48–47)	5	5:00	(Note: For the UFC Lightweight Championship.)
Catchweight (157.5 lb)	Donald Cerrone	def.	Melvin Guillard	KO (head kick and punch)	1	1:16
Middleweight	Jake Shields	vs.	Ed Herman	No Contest (overturned)	3	5:00	(Note: Originally ruled a Unanimous Decision (29-28, 30-27, 30-27) victory for Shields, result was overturned due to testing positive for a banned substance.)
Middleweight	Yushin Okami	def.	Buddy Roberts	TKO (punches)	2	3:05
Featherweight	Max Holloway	def.	Justin Lawrence	TKO (punches)	2	4:49
Preliminary Card (FX)
Featherweight	Dennis Bermudez	def.	Tommy Hayden	Submission (guillotine choke)	1	4:43	(Note: This bout aired on the broadcast following the Pérez vs Stone bout.)
Middleweight	Michael Kuiper	def.	Jared Hamman	TKO (punches)	2	2:16
Bantamweight	Erik Pérez	def.	Ken Stone	KO (punches)	1	0:17	(Note: This bout aired on the broadcast following the Henderson vs Edgar bout.)
Bantamweight	Chico Camus	def.	Dustin Pague	Decision (unanimous) (29–28, 30–27, 29–28)	3	5:00
Preliminary Card (Facebook)
Featherweight	Nik Lentz	def.	Eiji Mitsuoka	TKO (punches)	1	3:45

== Bonus awards ==
The following fighters received $60,000 bonuses.

- Fight of the Night: Donald Cerrone vs. Melvin Guillard
- Knockout of the Night: Donald Cerrone
- Submission of the Night: Dennis Bermudez

== See also ==
- List of UFC events
- 2012 in UFC
