= Henry Martinez (fighter) =

American mixed martial artist (born 1983)

- Born: August 7, 1983 (age 43); Albuquerque, New Mexico, United States
- Other names: Sicario
- Nationality: American
- Height: 5 ft 7 in (1.70 m)
- Weight: 152.3 lb (69.1 kg; 10.88 st)
- Division: Welterweight; Lightweight; Featherweight
- Reach: 69 in (175 cm)
- Stance: Southpaw
- Fighting out of: Albuquerque, New Mexico United States
- Team: Jackson's Mixed Martial Arts
- Trainer: Greg Jackson
- Years active: 2006-present

Mixed martial arts record
- Total: 13
- Wins: 9
- By knockout: 2
- By submission: 4
- By decision: 3
- Losses: 4
- By knockout: 2
- By decision: 2

Other information
- Mixed martial arts record from Sherdog

Henry Justin Martinez (born August 7, 1983) is an American mixed martial artist who last competed in the Lightweight division. A professional competitor since 2006, Martinez formerly competed for the UFC and Bellator.

== Mixed martial arts ==
=== Ultimate Fighting Championship ===
Martinez was signed to the UFC and stepped in to fight Matthew Riddle at welterweight on February 4, 2012 at UFC 143 after Riddle's original opponent Jorge Lopez was injured. He lost the fight via split decision.

Martinez faced Bernardo Magalhaes on June 8, 2012 at UFC on FX 3. He earned his first UFC victory via split decision.

Martinez was expected to face Daron Cruickshank on September 1, 2012 at UFC 151. However, after UFC 151 was cancelled, Martinez/Cruickshank was rescheduled and took place on December 8, 2012 at UFC on Fox 5. Martinez lost the fight via KO in the second round. After this loss he was released from the UFC.

== Personal life ==
Martinez was arrested in Albuquerque September 9, 2016 for hit and run of a cyclist on the Pan American Freeway frontage road. He was stopped by a citizen and held at gunpoint until law enforcement arrived. The dramatic scene was captured on video and shown by KRQE news in Albuquerque. Martinez drug the bicycle approximately a mile under his car until stopped by the good samaritan. Additionally, in 2018, Martinez pled guilty to possession of a controlled substance, and two counts of evading, resisting, or obstructing an officer according to New Mexico court records. This was for a separate incident.

== Mixed martial arts record ==
Professional record breakdown
13 matches	9 wins	4 losses
By knockout	2	2
By submission	4	0
By decision	3	2

Res.	Record	Opponent	Method	Event	Date	Round	Time	Location	Notes
Loss	9–4	Desmond Green	TKO (Punches)	NEF: Fight Night 7	May 16, 2013	2	1:50	Lewiston, Maine, United States	For the NEF Lightweight Championship.
Loss	9–3	Daron Cruickshank	KO (head kick)	UFC on Fox: Henderson vs. Diaz	December 8, 2012	2	2:57	Seattle, Washington, United States	Catchweight (158 lbs) bout; Martinez missed weight.
Win	9–2	Bernardo Magalhaes	Decision (split)	UFC on FX: Johnson vs. McCall	June 8, 2012	3	5:00	Sunrise, Florida, United States	Return to Lightweight.
Loss	8–2	Matthew Riddle	Decision (split)	UFC 143	February 4, 2012	3	5:00	Las Vegas, Nevada, United States	Welterweight bout.
Win	8–1	Ali Hanjani	Submission (reverse triangle choke)	JMMAS: Jackson's MMA Series 7	January 21, 2012	2	3:44	Albuquerque, New Mexico, United States	
Win	7–1	Jake McKnight	TKO (punches)	UCS: Caged Combat 5	December 9, 2011	1	3:43	Grand Ronde, Oregon, United States	
Win	6–1	Dave Mazany	Submission (rear naked choke)	JMMAS: Jackson's MMA Series 5	July 9, 2011	1	1:17	Albuquerque, New Mexico, United States	
Win	5–1	Ruben S. Gonzales	TKO (punches)	JMMAS: Jackson's MMA Series 2	September 4, 2010	3	1:34	Albuquerque, New Mexico, United States	
Loss	4–1	Wilson Reis	Decision (unanimous)	Bellator 2	April 10, 2009	3	5:00	Uncasville, Connecticut, United States	Featherweight bout.
Win	4–0	Erick Fernandez	Submission (rear naked choke)	WP: Warpath	September 27, 2008	2	2:38	Albuquerque, New Mexico, United States	
Win	3–0	Rocky Johnson	Decision (unanimous)	WFC: Armageddon	April 12, 2008	3	5:00	Denver, Colorado, United States	
Win	2–0	Chris Cisneros	Decision (unanimous)	YTYT: Ground Um and Pound Um	April 21, 2007	2	5:00	Kona, Hawaii, United States	
Win	1–0	Jason Harris	Submission (arm triangle choke)	Knuckle Up Productions: Fight Night	August 4, 2006	1	1:58	Santa Fe, New Mexico, United States	
