= UFC 151 =

UFC mixed martial arts event in 2012

UFC 151: Jones vs. Henderson
- The poster for UFC 151: Jones vs. Henderson
- Promotion: Ultimate Fighting Championship
- Date: September 1, 2012 (cancelled)
- Venue: Mandalay Bay Events Center
- City: Las Vegas, Nevada

Event chronology
| UFC 150: Henderson vs. Edgar II | UFC 151: Jones vs. Henderson | UFC 152: Jones vs. Belfort |

UFC 151: Jones vs. Henderson was a planned mixed martial arts event that was to be held by the Ultimate Fighting Championship on September 1, 2012, at the Mandalay Bay Events Center in Las Vegas, Nevada. It was to be headlined by a UFC Light Heavyweight Championship bout, between champion Jon Jones and former dual-division PRIDE FC and Strikeforce champion Dan Henderson. However, the event was cancelled on August 23, when the UFC announced Henderson was unable to fight due to injury, and Jones refused to take a replacement fight against longtime middleweight contender, Chael Sonnen.

== Background ==
The fight between Thiago Tavares and Dennis Hallman was originally scheduled to take place at UFC 150, but was moved to this event on July 12, 2012.

Josh Koscheck was expected to face Jake Ellenberger, but pulled out of the bout, citing a back injury and was replaced by returning veteran Jay Hieron.

=== Cancellation ===
On August 23, Dana White announced that Henderson had sustained a partial rupture of his MCL and had withdrawn from the fight. White then announced via press conference that UFC 151 would be the first event in the organization's history to be cancelled, after Jones declined to fight Chael Sonnen, who agreed to take the fight on eight days' notice. Initially, White announced that Jones would defend his title against Lyoto Machida at UFC 152 and that UFC 151 simply would not take place. Later, it emerged that Machida declined to fight Jones on such short notice. The UFC announced that former UFC Light Heavyweight Champion Vitor Belfort would challenge Jon Jones at UFC 152.

Initial reports indicated that UFC 152, scheduled to take place three weeks later, would be renamed UFC 151. However, Zuffa announced that UFC 152 would keep its name and UFC 151 would officially be deemed a "lost show". UFC middleweight champion at the time, Anderson Silva reportedly offered to save the event by fighting any light heavyweight other than Jon Jones, and UFC middleweight contender at the time Chris Weidman also inquired about fighting Jones, but both offers arrived too late, after cancellation processes began.

Dana White blamed the cancellation on Jones and his coach Greg Jackson, who advised him that accepting the fight with Sonnen on short notice would be the "biggest mistake of [his] entire career". However, some MMA analysts see the UFC at fault for promoting thin cards. With fights occurring nearly every weekend, the pool of fighters available as substitutes when injuries occur is shallow. CBS Sports columnist Gregg Doyel argued Dana White's mishandling of UFC 151 proved that UFC competitors need a union, stating: "...fights fall through all the time – the flimsy card fell apart. This was the UFC's fault. This was UFC president Dana White's fault." Dan Henderson was also criticized when it later emerged that he had been injured three weeks prior to the announcement and kept quiet about it as he still hoped to compete.

== Cancelled fight card ==
Main Card
| Weight class | | | | Method | Round | Time | Notes |
|---|---|---|---|---|---|---|---|
| Light Heavyweight | Jon Jones (c) | vs | Dan Henderson | | | | (Note: Scrapped.) |
| Welterweight | Jake Ellenberger | vs | Jay Hieron | | | | (Note: Moved to UFC on FX: Browne vs. Bigfoot.) |
| Featherweight | Dennis Siver | vs | Eddie Yagin | | | | (Note: Moved to UFC on Fox: Henderson vs. Diaz, scrapped again.) |
| Lightweight | Dennis Hallman | vs | Thiago Tavares | | | | (Note: Moved to UFC on FX: Browne vs. Bigfoot, scrapped again.) |
| Flyweight | John Lineker | vs | Yasuhiro Urushitani | | | | (Note: Moved to UFC on Fuel TV: Franklin vs. Le) |
Preliminary Card (FX)
| Lightweight | Michael Johnson | vs | Danny Castillo | | | | (Note: Moved to UFC on FX: Browne vs. Bigfoot) |
| Bantamweight | Takeya Mizugaki | vs | Jeff Hougland | | | | (Note: Moved to UFC on Fuel TV: Franklin vs. Le) |
| Lightweight | Tim Means | vs | Abel Trujillo | | | | (Note: Moved to UFC on Fox: Henderson vs. Diaz, scrapped again.) |
| Lightweight | Daron Cruickshank | vs | Henry Martinez | | | | (Note: Moved to UFC on Fox: Henderson vs. Diaz) |
Preliminary Card (Facebook)
| Lightweight | Shane Roller | vs | Jacob Volkmann | | | | (Note: Moved to UFC on FX: Browne vs. Bigfoot) |
| Welterweight | Kyle Noke | vs | Charlie Brenneman | | | | (Note: Moved to UFC 152) |

== See also ==
- List of UFC events
- 2012 in UFC
