= UFC 143 =

UFC mixed martial arts event in 2012

UFC 143: Diaz vs. Condit
- The poster for UFC 143: Diaz vs. Condit
- Promotion: Ultimate Fighting Championship
- Date: February 4, 2012
- Venue: Mandalay Bay Events Center
- City: Las Vegas, Nevada
- Attendance: 9,015
- Total gate: $2,400,000
- Buyrate: 400,000

Event chronology
UFC on Fox: Evans vs. Davis	UFC 143: Diaz vs. Condit	UFC on Fuel TV: Sanchez vs. Ellenberger

UFC 143: Diaz vs. Condit was a mixed martial arts event organized by Ultimate Fighting Championship on February 4, 2012, at the Mandalay Bay Events Center in Las Vegas, Nevada.

== Background ==
An episode of UFC Primetime returned to promote the main event.

Georges St-Pierre was originally scheduled to defend his title in the Welterweight division against Nick Diaz in the main event. However, on December 7, 2011, it was revealed that St-Pierre was injured and could not fight. Diaz instead faced Carlos Condit. The original opponent for Condit, Josh Koscheck, faced Mike Pierce at this event.

Erik Koch was expected to fight with Dustin Poirier, but was injured and was to be replaced by Ricardo Lamas. However, Lamas ended up injured as well and was replaced by future UFC Featherweight Champion Max Holloway who made his UFC debut in this event.

Amir Sadollah was scheduled to fight Jorge Lopez at the event, but due to an injury was replaced by Matthew Riddle.

Justin Edwards was expected to face Stephen Thompson, but was injured and replaced by Daniel Stittgen.

== Results ==
Main Card
Weight class				Method	Round	Time	Notes
Welterweight	Carlos Condit	def.	Nick Diaz	Decision (unanimous) (48–47, 49–46, 49–46)	5	5:00	(Note: For the interim UFC Welterweight Championship.)
Heavyweight	Fabrício Werdum	def.	Roy Nelson	Decision (unanimous) (30–27, 30–27, 30–27)	3	5:00
Welterweight	Josh Koscheck	def.	Mike Pierce	Decision (split) (28–29, 29–28, 29–28)	3	5:00
Bantamweight	Renan Barão	def.	Scott Jorgensen	Decision (unanimous) (30–27, 30–27, 30–27)	3	5:00
Middleweight	Ed Herman	def.	Clifford Starks	Submission (rear-naked choke)	2	1:43
Preliminary card (FX)
Featherweight	Dustin Poirier	def.	Max Holloway	Submission (triangle armbar)	1	3:23
Bantamweight	Edwin Figueroa	def.	Alex Caceres	Decision (split) (28–27, 27–28, 28–27)	3	5:00	(Note: Caceres had 2 points deducted in round 2 for a second kick to the groin.)
Welterweight	Matt Brown	def.	Chris Cope	KO (punches)	2	1:19
Welterweight	Matt Riddle	def.	Henry Martinez	Decision (split) (28–29, 29–28, 29–28)	3	5:00
Preliminary card (Facebook)
Middleweight	Rafael Natal	def.	Michael Kuiper	Decision (unanimous) (30–27, 30–27, 29–28)	3	5:00
Welterweight	Stephen Thompson	def.	Dan Stittgen	KO (head kick)	1	4:13

== Bonus awards ==
The following fighters received $65,000 bonuses.

- Fight of the Night: Fabrício Werdum vs. Roy Nelson
- Submission of the Night: Dustin Poirier
- Knockout of the Night: Stephen Thompson

== Reported payout ==
The following is the reported payout to the fighters as reported to the Nevada State Athletic Commission. It does not include sponsor money and also does not include the UFC's traditional "fight night" bonuses.

- Carlos Condit: $110,000 (includes $55,000 win bonus) def. Nick Diaz: $200,000
- Fabrício Werdum: $100,000 (no win bonus) def. Roy Nelson: $20,000
- Josh Koscheck: $146,000 (includes $73,000 win bonus) def. Mike Pierce: $20,000
- Renan Barão: $22,000 (includes $11,000 win bonus) def. Scott Jorgensen: $20,500
- Ed Herman: $62,000 (includes $31,000 win bonus) def. Clifford Starks: $8,000
- Dustin Poirier: $24,000 (includes $12,000 win bonus) vs. Max Holloway: $6,000
- Edwin Figueroa: $16,000 (includes $8,000 win bonus) def. Alex Caceres: $8,000
- Matt Brown: $30,000 (includes $15,000 win bonus) def. Chris Cope: $8,000
- Matt Riddle: $30,000 (includes $15,000 win bonus) def. Henry Martinez: $6,000
- Rafael Natal: $20,000 (includes $10,000 win bonus) def. Michael Kuiper: $6,000
- Stephen Thompson: $12,000 (includes $6,000 win bonus) def. Dan Stittgen: $6,000

== See also ==
- List of UFC events
- 2012 in UFC
