= UFC on Fox: Henderson vs. Diaz =

UFC mixed martial arts event in 2012

- The poster for UFC on Fox: Henderson vs. Diaz
- Promotion: Ultimate Fighting Championship
- Date: December 8, 2012
- Venue: KeyArena
- City: Seattle, Washington
- Attendance: 14,387
- Total gate: $1,522,600

Event chronology
UFC 154: St-Pierre vs. Condit	UFC on Fox: Henderson vs. Diaz	UFC on FX: Sotiropoulos vs. Pearson

UFC on Fox: Henderson vs. Diaz (also known as UFC on Fox 5) was a mixed martial arts event that was held by the Ultimate Fighting Championship on December 8, 2012, at KeyArena in Seattle, Washington. It was broadcast live on Fox Sports.

== Background ==
As a result of the cancellation of UFC 151, bouts between Tim Means vs. Abel Trujillo, Daron Cruickshank vs. Henry Martinez and Dennis Siver vs. Eddie Yagin were rescheduled for this event.

Rafaello Oliveira was expected to face Michael Chiesa at the event. However, Oliveira was forced out of the bout with a broken hand, and replaced by Marcus LeVesseur. Then, the week of the event, Chiesa was forced out of the bout with LeVesseur with an undisclosed illness and the bout was scrapped altogether. Also, on the day of the weigh-ins for the event, Tim Means was forced from his bout with Abel Trujillo after sustaining a head injury caused by a fall in a hotel sauna. LeVesseur replaced Means in the bout.

T.J. Dillashaw was scheduled to fight Mike Easton in the preliminary card. However, an injury sidelined Dillashaw, who was forced out of the bout and replaced by Bryan Caraway. Then, on November 21, it was announced that Caraway was forced out of the bout with an injury and replaced by Raphael Assunção.

Eddie Yagin was expected to face Dennis Siver at this event. However, Yagin was forced out of the bout due to a sparring injury that landed him in the hospital with swelling around his brain, and was replaced by Nam Phan.

John Cholish was expected to face Yves Edwards at the event. However, Cholish was forced out of the bout with a groin injury and replaced by Jeremy Stephens.

Lavar Johnson was scheduled to face Brendan Schaub at the event. However, Johnson was forced out of the bout with a groin injury and Schaub was pulled from the card altogether.

At the weigh-ins, Henry Martinez came in heavy weighing in at 158.8 lb. Martinez was given two hours to cut to the lightweight maximum of 156 pounds, but he elected instead to surrender a percentage of his fight purse to his opponent Daron Cruickshank.

At the pre-weigh-in press conference, UFC, as part of merging Strikeforce champions into the UFC, officially named Strikeforce champion Ronda Rousey the women's bantamweight champion and presented her with a belt.

== Results ==
Main Card (Fox)
Weight class				Method	Round	Time	Notes
Lightweight	Benson Henderson (c)	def.	Nate Diaz	Decision (unanimous) (50–43, 50–45, 50–45)	5	5:00	(Note: For the UFC Lightweight Championship.)
Light Heavyweight	Alexander Gustafsson	def.	Maurício Rua	Decision (unanimous) (30–27, 30–27, 30–26)	3	5:00
Welterweight	Rory MacDonald	def.	B.J. Penn	Decision (unanimous) (30–26, 30–26, 30–27)	3	5:00
Welterweight	Matt Brown	def.	Mike Swick	KO (punches)	2	2:31
Preliminary Card (FX)
Lightweight	Yves Edwards	def.	Jeremy Stephens	KO (punches and elbows)	1	1:55
Bantamweight	Raphael Assunção	def.	Mike Easton	Decision (unanimous) (29–28, 30–27, 30–27)	3	5:00
Lightweight	Ramsey Nijem	def.	Joe Proctor	Decision (unanimous) (30–27, 29–28, 29–28)	3	5:00
Catchweight (158.8 lb)	Daron Cruickshank	def.	Henry Martinez	KO (head kick)	2	2:57
Lightweight	Abel Trujillo	def.	Marcus LeVesseur	TKO (knees to the body)	2	3:56
Featherweight	Dennis Siver	def.	Nam Phan	Decision (unanimous) (30–24, 30–25, 30–26)	3	5:00
Preliminary Card (Facebook)
Bantamweight	Scott Jorgensen	def.	John Albert	Submission (rear-naked choke)	1	4:59

== Bonus awards ==
The following fighters received $65,000 bonuses.

- Fight of the Night: Scott Jorgensen vs. John Albert
- Knockout of the Night: Yves Edwards
- Submission of the Night: Scott Jorgensen

== Reported Payout ==
The following is the reported payout to the fighters as reported to the Washington State Department of Licensing. It does not include sponsor money and also does not include the UFC's traditional "fight night" bonuses.

- Benson Henderson: $78,000 (includes $39,000 win bonus) def. Nate Diaz: $50,000
- Alexander Gustafsson: $60,000 (includes $30,000 win bonus) def. Maurício Rua: $175,000
- Rory MacDonald: $42,000 (includes $21,000 win bonus) def. B.J. Penn: $150,000
- Matt Brown: $54,000 (includes $27,000 win bonus) def. Mike Swick: $48,000
- Yves Edwards: $32,000 (includes $16,000 win bonus) def. Jeremy Stephens: $24,000
- Raphael Assunção: $38,000 (includes $19,000 win bonus) def. Mike Easton: $25,000
- Ramsey Nijem: $20,000 (includes $10,000 win bonus) def. Joe Proctor: $8,000
- Daron Cruickshank: $16,000 (includes $8,000 win bonus) def. Henry Martinez: $8,000 ^
- Abel Trujillo: $12,000 (includes $6,000 win bonus) def. Marcus LeVesseur: $8,000
- Dennis Siver: $62,000 (includes $31,000 win bonus) def. Nam Phan: $10,000
- Scott Jorgensen: $41,000 (includes $20,500 win bonus) def. John Albert: $10,000

^ Henry Martinez was reportedly fined 20 percent of his purse for failing to make the required weight for his fight. The Washington State Department of Licensing's initial report did not include information on the penalty.

== See also ==
- List of UFC events
- 2012 in UFC
