= UFC on Fox: Johnson vs. Moraga =

UFC mixed martial arts event in 2013

- The poster for UFC on Fox: Johnson vs. Moraga
- Promotion: Ultimate Fighting Championship
- Date: July 27, 2013
- Venue: KeyArena
- City: Seattle, Washington
- Attendance: 8,967
- Total gate: $700,081

Event chronology
UFC 162: Silva vs. Weidman	UFC on Fox: Johnson vs. Moraga	UFC 163: Aldo vs. Korean Zombie

UFC on Fox: Johnson vs. Moraga (also known as UFC on Fox 8) was a mixed martial arts event held on July 27, 2013, at the KeyArena in Seattle, Washington. The event was broadcast live on FX and Fox.

== Background ==
The main event was a UFC Flyweight Championship bout between champion Demetrious Johnson and top contender John Moraga. The pairing was originally expected to take place on April 13, 2013 at The Ultimate Fighter 17 Finale. However, Johnson was forced out of the bout with an injury and Moraga was pulled from that event as well.

Michael Chiesa was originally set to face Reza Madadi on this card. However, on May 14, 2013, it was announced Madadi pulled out of the bout citing alleged visa issues and was replaced by Jorge Masvidal.

Miesha Tate was pulled from her scheduled bout with Liz Carmouche to participate as coach on The Ultimate Fighter 18 and was replaced by Jéssica Andrade.

Tarec Saffiedine was expected to make his promotional debut at this event opposite Robbie Lawler; however, Saffiedine was forced out of the bout with an injury and was replaced by Siyar Bahadurzada. On July 11, it was announced that Bahadurzada also pulled out of the bout and was replaced by Bobby Voelker.

Matt Mitrione was expected to face Brendan Schaub at the event. However, in mid-July, Mitrione pulled out of the bout citing an injury and Schaub was pulled from the event as well with the pairing rescheduled to UFC 165.

Danny Castillo was expected to face Bobby Green at the event, however, in mid-July, Green pulled out of the bout citing an injury and was replaced by Tim Means.

Yves Edwards was expected to fight Spencer Fisher on this card. However, on July 11, Fisher was removed from the bout due to injury and replaced by Daron Cruickshank.

Both John Albert and Tim Means missed weight for their respective fights; rather than use time to cut additional weight, both men forfeited 20 percent of their purses to their opponent and the bouts were made catchweight affairs.

== Results ==
Main card (Fox)
Weight class				Method	Round	Time	Notes
Flyweight	Demetrious Johnson (c)	def.	John Moraga	Submission (armbar)	5	3:43	(Note: For the UFC Flyweight Championship.)
Welterweight	Rory MacDonald	def.	Jake Ellenberger	Decision (unanimous) (30–27, 29–28, 30–27)	3	5:00
Welterweight	Robbie Lawler	def.	Bobby Voelker	KO (head kick and punches)	2	0:24
Women's Bantamweight	Liz Carmouche	def.	Jéssica Andrade	TKO (punches and elbows)	2	3:57
Preliminary card (FX)
Lightweight	Jorge Masvidal	def.	Michael Chiesa	Submission (D'Arce choke)	2	4:59
Catchweight (160 lb)	Danny Castillo	def.	Tim Means	Decision (unanimous) (29–28, 29–28, 29–28)	3	5:00
Lightweight	Melvin Guillard	def.	Mac Danzig	KO (punches)	2	2:47
Lightweight	Daron Cruickshank	def.	Yves Edwards	Decision (split) (30–27, 27–30, 30–27)	3	5:00
Middleweight	Ed Herman	def.	Trevor Smith	Decision (split) (27–30, 30–27, 29–28)	3	5:00
Women's Bantamweight	Germaine de Randamie	def.	Julie Kedzie	Decision (split) (30–27, 28–29, 29–28)	3	5:00
Preliminary card (Facebook)
Lightweight	Justin Salas	def.	Aaron Riley	Decision (split) (29–28, 28–29, 29–28)	3	5:00
Catchweight (137 lb)	Yaotzin Meza	def.	John Albert	Submission (rear-naked choke)	2	2:49

== Bonus awards ==
The following fighters received $50,000 bonuses.

- Fight of The Night: Ed Herman vs. Trevor Smith
- Knockout of The Night: Melvin Guillard
- Submission of the Night: Demetrious Johnson

== Reported payout ==
The following is the reported payout to the fighters as reported to the Washington State Department of Licensing. It does not include sponsor money and also does not include the UFC's traditional "fight night" bonuses.

- Demetrious Johnson: $58,000 (includes $29,000 win bonus) def. John Moraga: $17,000
- Rory MacDonald: $48,000 (includes $24,000 win bonus) def. Jake Ellenberger: $52,000
- Robbie Lawler: $156,000 (includes $78,000 win bonus) def. Bobby Voelker: $12,000
- Liz Carmouche: $24,000 (includes $12,000 win bonus) def. Jéssica Andrade: $8,000
- Jorge Masvidal: $66,000 (includes $33,000 win bonus) def. Michael Chiesa: $15,000
- Danny Castillo: $58,000 (includes $29,000 win bonus) def. Tim Means: $12,000 ^
- Melvin Guillard: $84,000 (includes $42,000 win bonus) def. Mac Danzig: $30,000
- Daron Cruickshank: $20,000 (includes $10,000 win bonus) def. Yves Edwards: $21,000
- Ed Herman: $74,000 (includes $37,000 win bonus) def. Trevor Smith: $8,000
- Germaine de Randamie: $18,000 (includes $9,000 win bonus) def. Julie Kedzie: $9,000
- Justin Salas: $16,000 (includes $8,000 win bonus) def. Aaron Riley: $8,000
- Yaotzin Meza: $20,000 (includes $10,000 win bonus) def. John Albert: $10,000 ^

^ John Albert and Tim Means were reportedly fined 20 percent of their purse for failing to make the required weight for their fights. The Washington State Department of Licensing's initial report did not include information on the penalty.

== See also ==
- List of UFC events
- 2013 in UFC
