= Cody McKenzie =

American mixed martial arts fighter (born 1987)

- Born: Cody Steven McKenzie; December 16, 1987 (age 38); Cordova, Alaska, U.S.
- Other names: The AK Kid
- Height: 6 ft 0 in (1.83 m)
- Weight: 170 lb (77 kg; 12 st 2 lb)
- Division: Welterweight(2014); Middleweight (2014); Lightweight (2009–2012; 2013); Featherweight (2007–2009; 2012–2013)
- Reach: 72 in (183 cm)
- Stance: Southpaw
- Fighting out of: Spokane, Washington, United States
- Team: Cesar Gracie Jiu-Jitsu
- Rank: Brown belt in Brazilian jiu-jitsu
- Years active: 2007–2014; 2015–present

Mixed martial arts record
- Total: 28
- Wins: 17
- By knockout: 1
- By submission: 15
- By decision: 1
- Losses: 11
- By knockout: 4
- By submission: 4
- By decision: 2
- By disqualification: 1

Other information
- Mixed martial arts record from Sherdog

Cody Steven McKenzie (born December 16, 1987) is an American mixed martial artist. A professional competitor since 2007, McKenzie mostly competed in his regional circuit, before signing with the Ultimate Fighting Championship to appear on The Ultimate Fighter: Team GSP vs. Team Koscheck, and has also competed for M-1 Global.

== Background ==
McKenzie was born in Cordova, Alaska and currently trains in Spokane, Washington. He saw his first MMA fight when he was a sophomore at Selkirk High School and knew from then on that he wanted to be an MMA fighter.

McKenzie is a member of the "Fancy Pants Fight Team", named after Lyle Beerbohm. Prior to joining the Ultimate Fighting Championship, McKenzie recorded ten successive submission victories, nine of which were by guillotine choke.

McKenzie also utilizes his own variation of the guillotine choke which he names "The McKenzietine". McKenzie flips his shoulder a different way to the standard guillotine choke, before arching his shoulder. According to Sherdog.com, McKenzie has the third-most guillotine choke victories in the world behind only two fighters who have each had over 50 fights in their respective careers, one being Travis Fulton, the front-runner, who despite having had over 300 fights has only two more guillotine victories than McKenzie.

== Mixed martial arts career ==
=== Early career ===
McKenzie began his professional mixed martial arts career with a TKO victory over Brett Held in British Columbia, Canada. This was his only fight to go to a second round in his career prior to the UFC. Less than a month later, McKenzie faced Abe Jones, defeating him via triangle choke in the first round.

After taking almost a year away from competition, McKenzie returned to face Benny Mawson, once again in British Columbia, Canada. After 100 seconds, McKenzie caught his opponent in a guillotine choke, taking his record to 3–0. This began his long stretch of victories via guillotine choke. During this near-record setting span, McKenzie fought several times in B.C. and in various locations in Washington. McKenzie also fought in Bahrain on one occasion, taking just four minutes to defeat his opponent with a guillotine choke. Before signing with the UFC, McKenzie had a record of 11–0, with nine successive first-round guillotine choke finishes.

=== The Ultimate Fighter ===
McKenzie signed with the Ultimate Fighting Championship to appear on The Ultimate Fighter: Team GSP vs. Team Koscheck.

McKenzie competed on the debut episode against Amir Khillah, to get into the house. Prior to the fight, Georges St-Pierre predicted a guillotine choke submission victory for McKenzie. This proved to be correct as McKenzie forced a technical submission victory over Khillah in the opening round.

In the second episode, the team picks were made. Georges St-Pierre picked McKenzie as his sixth pick (twelfth overall).

McKenzie was next picked to face Koscheck's number one pick Marc Stevens. Stevens went for an early takedown, but was caught in a guillotine choke submission. With just 18 seconds on the clock, Stevens passed out and McKenzie was declared the winner.

In the quarterfinals, McKenzie faced Nam Phan of Team Koscheck. He lost the fight via TKO in the second round after Phan dropped him with a combo to the body.

=== Ultimate Fighting Championship ===
McKenzie made his UFC debut at The Ultimate Fighter: Team GSP vs. Team Koscheck Finale against Aaron Wilkinson. He went on to defeat Wilkinson via submission (a guillotine choke applied to Wilkinson's jaw) at 2:03 of round one. McKenzie earned the Submission of the Night award for his performance.

McKenzie made a quick return to the octagon as he replaced Melvin Guillard to face Yves Edwards at UFC: Fight for the Troops 2 on January 22, 2011. After a back and forth battle that saw both men in control, McKenzie lost the fight via rear naked choke submission in the second round.

McKenzie was expected to face Bart Palaszewski on May 28, 2011, at UFC 130, but was forced off the card with an injury and was replaced by Gleison Tibau.

McKenzie faced Vagner Rocha on September 17, 2011, at UFC Fight Night 25. He lost the fight via submission in the second round.

McKenzie was expected to face Michael Johnson on January 28, 2012, at UFC on Fox 2. However, McKenzie was forced out of the bout with an injury and was replaced by Shane Roller.

McKenzie was expected to face Aaron Riley on May 15, 2012, at UFC on Fuel TV: The Korean Zombie vs. Poirier. However, Riley was pulled from the event and replaced by promotional newcomer Marcus LeVesseur. McKenzie won the fight via submission in the first round.

McKenzie dropped to featherweight and faced Chad Mendes on July 7, 2012, at UFC 148. He lost the fight via first-round TKO.

McKenzie was expected to face Leonard Garcia on December 29, 2012, at UFC 155. However, McKenzie pulled out of the bout, citing an injury, and was replaced by Max Holloway.

The bout with Leonard Garcia was rescheduled for April 27, 2013, at UFC 159. McKenzie won the fight via unanimous decision, the first decision win of his career.

McKenzie faced Sam Stout in a lightweight bout on December 14, 2013, at UFC on Fox 9. He lost the fight via unanimous decision. During the fight, McKenzie wore basketball shorts with the tag still on them, which UFC president Dana White called "UFC amateur hour." McKenzie was subsequently released from the promotion.

=== Post-UFC ===
McKenzie fought at a 180-pound catchweight on April 12, 2014, against Mark Dobie at Battle for the Border 3. He won the fight via rear-naked choke submission.

On October 3, 2014, McKenzie faced Brock Larson in the opening round of the BattleGrounds MMA one-night welterweight tournament. He lost the fight via second-round submission.

On December 18, 2014, McKenzie announced his retirement from mixed martial arts.

Two months after announcing his first retirement, it was announced on February 3, 2015, that McKenzie had signed with WSOF. He faced Andrew McInnes at World Series of Fighting 18: Moraes vs. Hill on February 12, 2015. He lost the fight via disqualification, after a headbutt from McKenzie rendered McInnes unable to continue.

On October 14, 2017, McKenzie fought for Venator, losing by first-round TKO to Stefano Paterno. He was later suspended by the Italian MMA commission for refusing to provide a sample to anti-doping officers.

The following year in September 2018, McKenzie was due to face J.D. Domengeaux at a Tuff-N-Uff event. The fight was called off the day before the bout after McKenzie refused to provide a urine sample to anti-doping and then attempted to provide fake urine. In November Mckenzie was suspended by the Nevada Athletic Commission for four years.

== Bare knuckle boxing ==
Cody Mckenzie fought in a bare-knuckle boxing fight with the United Kingdom's BKB-Bare Knuckle Boxing organization, debuting against its most recognized star fighter, undefeated Middleweight Champion Jimmy "Celtic Warrior" Sweeney for the BKB Middleweight World Championship at BKB 4. Sweeney did as many in the bare-knuckle scene expected he would and controlled the fight from start to finish, playing with McKenzie at times and knocking him down 5 times before the fight was eventually stopped via TKO.

== Film and television ==
McKenzie was featured in the mixed martial arts documentary Fight Life.

== Championships and achievements ==
- Ultimate Fighting Championship
  - Fight of the Night (One time) vs. Yves Edwards
  - Submission of the Night (One time) vs. Aaron Wilkinson

== Mixed martial arts record ==
Professional record breakdown
28 matches	17 wins	11 losses
By knockout	1	4
By submission	15	4
By decision	1	2
By disqualification	0	1

Res.	Record	Opponent	Method	Event	Date	Round	Time	Location	Notes
Win	17–11	Chris Ensley	Submission (guillotine choke)	Conquest of the Cage: McKenzie vs. Ensley	October 29, 2021	1	2:08	Airway Heights, Washington, United States	
Loss	16–11	Stefano Paterno	TKO (punches)	Venator FC: Kingdom 1	October 14, 2017	1	4:59	Milan, Italy	McKenzie was suspended after refusing to provide a post fight drug testing sample
Loss	16–10	Joe Riggs	TKO (submission to punches)	Z Promotions: Fight Night Medicine Hat 2	October 28, 2016	1	1:51	Medicine Hat, Alberta, Canada	
Win	16–9	Valeriu Mircea	Submission (guillotine choke)	Venator FC III	May 21, 2016	2	1:30	Milan, Italy	
Loss	15–9	Ryan Machan	Submission (shoulder lock)	Fight Night Medicine Hat	April 9, 2016	1	4:04	Alberta, Canada	
Loss	15–8	David Bielkheden	Decision (unanimous)	Superior Challenge 12	May 16, 2015	3	5:00	Malmö, Sweden	
Loss	15–7	Andrew McInnes	DQ (intentional headbutt)	WSOF 18	February 12, 2015	1	4:57	Edmonton, Alberta, Canada	
Loss	15–6	Beslan Isaev	KO (knee)	M-1 Challenge 54	December 17, 2014	1	2:20	St. Petersburg, Russia	
Loss	15–5	Brock Larson	Submission (arm-triangle choke)	BattleGrounds MMA 5: O.N.E.	October 3, 2014	2	1:43	Tulsa, Oklahoma, United States	Tournament Quarterfinal; Welterweight bout
Win	15–4	Mark Dobie	Submission (rear-naked choke)	Battle for the Border 3 - Nations Collide	April 12, 2014	1	2:28	Cranbrook, British Columbia, Canada	Catchweight of 180 lbs.
Loss	14–4	Sam Stout	Decision (unanimous)	UFC on Fox: Johnson vs. Benavidez 2	December 14, 2013	3	5:00	Sacramento, California, United States	Lightweight bout
Win	14–3	Leonard Garcia	Decision (unanimous)	UFC 159	April 27, 2013	3	5:00	Newark, New Jersey, United States	
Loss	13–3	Chad Mendes	KO (punch to the body)	UFC 148	July 7, 2012	1	0:31	Las Vegas, Nevada, United States	Featherweight debut
Win	13–2	Marcus LeVesseur	Submission (guillotine choke)	UFC on Fuel TV: The Korean Zombie vs. Poirier	May 15, 2012	1	3:05	Fairfax, Virginia, United States	
Loss	12–2	Vagner Rocha	Submission (rear-naked choke)	UFC Fight Night: Shields vs. Ellenberger	September 17, 2011	2	3:49	New Orleans, Louisiana, United States	
Loss	12–1	Yves Edwards	Technical Submission (rear-naked choke)	UFC: Fight for the Troops 2	January 22, 2011	2	4:33	Fort Hood, Texas, United States	Fight of the Night
Win	12–0	Aaron Wilkinson	Submission (guillotine choke)	The Ultimate Fighter: Team GSP vs. Team Koscheck Finale	December 4, 2010	1	2:03	Las Vegas, Nevada, United States	Submission of the Night
Win	11–0	Brandon MacArthur	Submission (guillotine choke)	AM Ford: Fight Night 2010	April 17, 2010	1	2:00	Trail, British Columbia, Canada	
Win	10–0	Len Bentley	Submission (guillotine choke)	Rumble on the Ridge 6: Regeneration	January 9, 2010	1	3:04	Snoqualmie, Washington, United States	
Win	9–0	Ryan Farhat	Submission (guillotine choke)	Raw Power: MMA	December 10, 2009	1	4:00	Sanabis, Manama, Bahrain	
Win	8–0	Bobby Sanchez	Submission (guillotine choke)	Conquest of the Cage 6	September 16, 2009	1	0:30	Spokane, Washington, United States	
Win	7–0	Casey Hobson	Submission (guillotine choke)	AM Ford: Fight Night 2009	April 18, 2009	1	2:52	Trail, British Columbia, Canada	
Win	6–0	Jeremy Burnett	Submission (guillotine choke)	CageSport MMA	November 29, 2008	1	2:16	Tacoma, Washington, United States	
Win	5–0	Rob Roy	Submission (guillotine choke)	Caged Rage 2	October 4, 2008	1	0:44	Castlegar, British Columbia, Canada	
Win	4–0	Dennis Parks	Submission (guillotine choke)	EWC: Vancouver Cage Fights	September 6, 2008	1	1:37	Ridgefield, Washington, United States	
Win	3–0	Benny Mawson	Submission (guillotine choke)	GFS: Ford Fight Night	April 19, 2008	1	1:40	Trail, British Columbia, Canada	
Win	2–0	Abe Jones	Submission (triangle choke)	PFA: Ultimate Cage Fighting	May 17, 2007	1	2:09	Spokane, Washington, United States	
Win	1–0	Brett Held	TKO (punches)	GFS: Helter Smelter	April 21, 2007	2	1:15	Trail, British Columbia, Canada	

== Bare-knuckle boxing record ==
Professional record breakdown
1 match	0 wins	1 loss
By knockout	0	1
By submission	0	0
By decision	0	0

Res.	Record	Opponent	Method	Event	Date	Round	Time	Location	Notes
Loss	0–1	Jimmy Sweeney	TKO (Referee Stoppage)	BKB 4	February 2017	3	N/A	London, England, United Kingdom	For the BKB Middleweight World Championship
