= Yves Edwards =

Bahamian martial artist

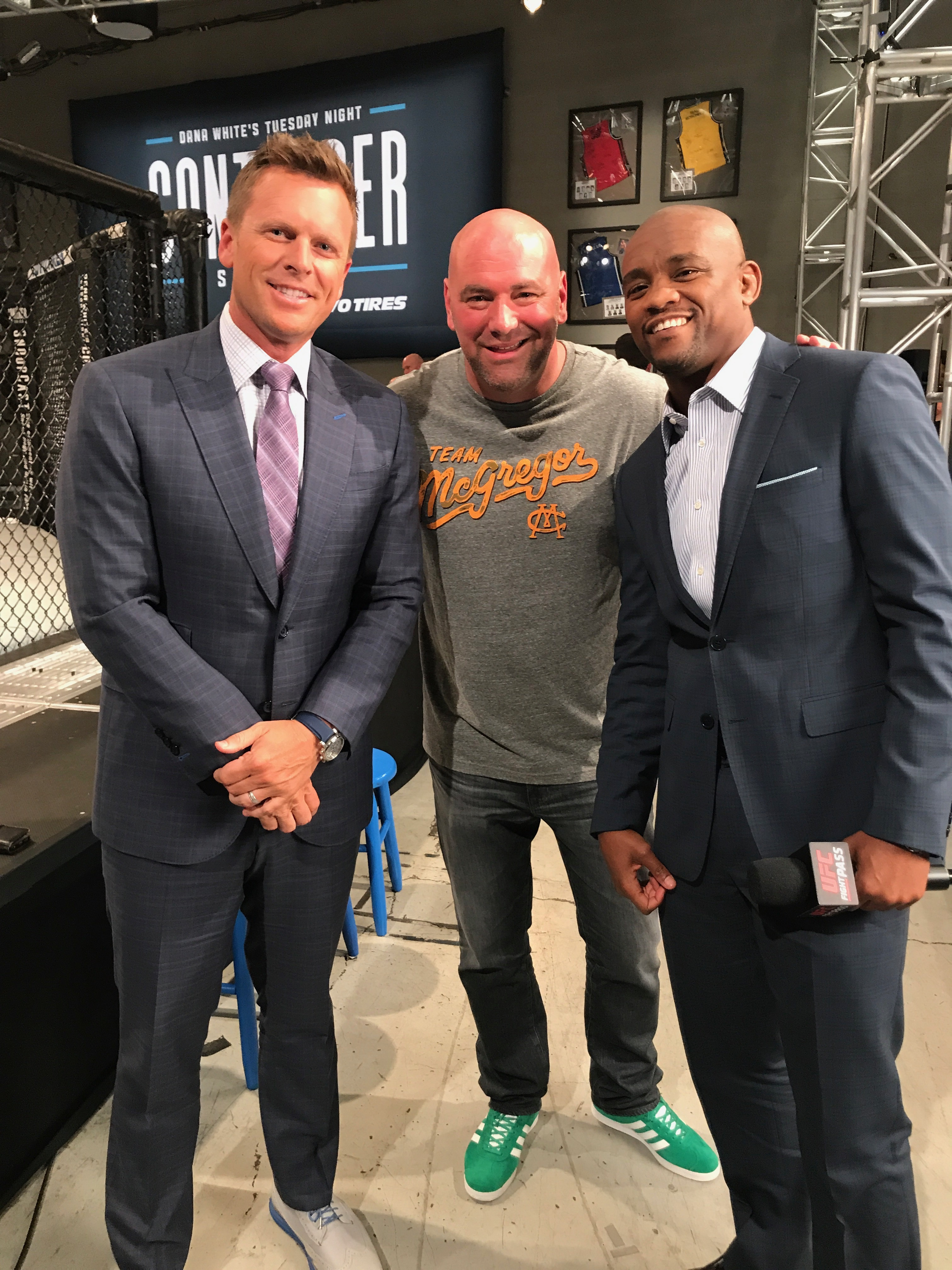
- Yves (first from right) in 2017
- Born: September 30, 1976 (age 50); Nassau, New Providence, Bahamas
- Other names: Thugjitsu Master
- Height: 5 ft 10 in (1.78 m)
- Weight: 155 lb (70 kg; 11.1 st)
- Division: Lightweight; Welterweight
- Reach: 73 in (190 cm)
- Style: Karate Muay Thai Brazilian Jiu-Jitsu Kung Fu Ninjutsu
- Stance: Southpaw
- Fighting out of: Conroe, Texas, United States
- Team: American Top Team; The Revolution Dojo
- Rank: Black belt in Brazilian jiu-jitsu under Travis Tooke
- Years active: 1997–2014

Professional boxing record
- Total: 2
- Wins: 2
- By knockout: 2
- Losses: 0

Mixed martial arts record
- Total: 66
- Wins: 42
- By knockout: 17
- By submission: 16
- By decision: 9
- Losses: 22
- By knockout: 4
- By submission: 6
- By decision: 12
- Draws: 1
- No contests: 1

Other information
- Boxing record from BoxRec
- Mixed martial arts record from Sherdog

Yves Edwards (born September 30, 1976) is a Bahamian retired mixed martial artist, who is best known for competing in the UFC's Lightweight division, fighting 21 times in the promotion. A professional competitor since 1997, he also competed for PRIDE, the WEC, Strikeforce, Bellator, EliteXC, King of the Cage, BodogFIGHT, the MFC, and HDNet Fights. For a period of time (2004), Edwards was ranked as the #1 Lightweight in the world.

== Background ==
Edwards was born on the island of New Providence in the Bahamas and moved to Texas when he was 14 years old. Edwards began training in traditional Karate in his youth, moving on to Kung Fu and Ninjutsu before eventually taking up mixed martial arts. This also led him to Muay Thai in order to improve his stand-up. Like many aspiring martial artists, Edwards cites Hong Kong cinema as a formative influence. He has been quoted as saying "I've always liked the old Hong Kong flicks, and I was a big comic book fan: you know the superheroes, they were always big in my mind. Anything that will make me physically better than the average person, and teach me to do things that the average person can't do, I was game for it."

Based in Houston since his teens, Edwards says he learned some grappling on a trip back home to the Bahamas at the age of 17, although "it wasn't as technical as it should have been, but it was better than not getting anything." He is a well-rounded fighter, with a strong boxing background, having also trained with Lewis Wood, a #6 WBA Featherweight Boxer. This is in addition to his experience in Muay Thai and Brazilian Jiu-Jitsu, of which he says "I've never worn a gi 'cause I've always been competing".

== Mixed martial arts career ==
=== Early career ===
Edwards made his professional mixed martial arts debut in 1997 and compiled a record of 18-5-1 before being signed by the UFC.

=== Ultimate Fighting Championship and World Extreme Cagefighting ===
Edwards made his UFC debut at UFC 33 against Matt Serra and was defeated via unanimous decision. He would then go 6–1 in his next seven appearances under the Zuffa banner.

At UFC 49, Edwards knocked out Josh Thomson by way of a spectacular flying head-kick. Due to the fact that the lightweight division had no current champion at the time, Edwards was regarded as "The Uncrowned Lightweight Champion of the UFC."

=== Post-UFC ===
After two wins in the EliteXC promotion, Edwards lost to EliteXC Lightweight Champion K. J. Noons via KO in the first round in June 2008, and lost a unanimous decision to Duane Ludwig at Strikeforce: Destruction.

He rebounded with a submission victory against James Warfield in September 2009, and next defeated Kyle Jensen by way of TKO in the first round. Yves followed up that victory the following February with an impressive quick TKO of fellow UFC veteran Derrick Noble.

=== Return to the UFC ===
Edwards returned to the UFC against John Gunderson on September 15, 2010, at UFC Fight Night 22, replacing Efraín Escudero who was promoted to the main card. Edwards won the fight via unanimous decision.

Edwards was expected to face Melvin Guillard on January 22, 2011, at UFC Fight Night 23, but Guillard was promoted to the main event against Evan Dunham after Kenny Florian was forced off the card with an injury. Edwards then faced replacement Cody McKenzie on the card, and won via rear naked choke in the second round earning Fight of the Night and Submission of the Night honors.

Edwards fought Sam Stout on June 11, 2011, at UFC 131 and was knocked out by an overhand left at 3:52 of the first round.

Edwards defeated Rafaello Oliveira via second-round TKO on October 1, 2011, at UFC on Versus 6.

Edwards faced Tony Ferguson on December 3, 2011, at The Ultimate Fighter 14 Finale. Edwards lost the fight via unanimous decision in a back and forth fight.

Edwards was expected to face Donald Cerrone at UFC on Fuel TV: The Korean Zombie vs. Poirier on May 15, 2012. However, Edwards was forced from the bout with an injury and replaced by Jeremy Stephens.

Edwards was expected to face Jeremy Stephens on October 5, 2012, at UFC on FX 5. However, the bout was cancelled due to Stephens being arrested on the day of the event for an assault charge that dated back to 2011. The fight eventually took place on December 8, 2012, at UFC on Fox 5. Edwards won by knockout in the first round, being the first fighter to ever stop Stephens via strikes.

Edwards faced promotional newcomer Isaac Vallie-Flagg on February 2, 2013, at UFC 156. He lost the fight via split decision.

Edwards was expected to face Spencer Fisher on July 27, 2013, at UFC on Fox 8. However, on July 11, Fisher was removed from the bout due to injury and replaced by Daron Cruickshank. He lost a split decision.

Edwards made his nineteenth UFC appearance when he took on Yancy Medeiros at UFC Fight For The Troops 3 on November 6, 2013. He lost the fight via knockout in the first round. The loss, however, was subsequently overturned to a no contest when Medeiros tested positive for marijuana.

Edwards was expected to face Piotr Hallmann at UFC 173 on May 24, 2014. However, the bout was moved and took place on June 7, 2014, at UFC Fight Night 42 instead. Edwards lost the fight via rear-naked choke submission in the third round.

Edwards faced Akbarh Arreola on November 22, 2014, at UFC Fight Night 57. He lost the fight via armbar submission in the first round.

=== Retirement ===
Following the loss, Edwards announced his official retirement from mixed martial arts, closing out his career after seventeen years. Edwards said on Facebook "Fighting has been a part of my life ever since I was 17 and that makes this a hard pill to swallow but it's time for me to end this chapter and move on to the next part of my life." Edwards is the only mixed martial arts fighter that competed for UFC, PRIDE, WEC, Strikeforce and Bellator.

== Professional grappling career ==
Edwards competed against Joshua Sharpless at Submission Hunter Pro 84 on July 22, 2023, losing by unanimous decision.

== Fighting style ==
=== Thugjitsu ===
The term "Thugjitsu" first emerged with Edwards, its proclaimed founder. Edwards was seen by many as an unorthodox fighter. This was exemplified by Edwards's flying head kick KO of Josh Thomson at UFC 49. Edwards's fighting style led to his nickname "Thugjitsu Master".

Edwards defined Thugjitsu as "The combination of every range of fighting and is the ultimate combat sport. Boxing, Thaiboxing, Wrestling and BJJ all play an equally important role in Thugjitsu; yet none of these arts is enough to be successful alone. A solid combination of two, three or more these and other arts help in the make-up of the complete fighter."

UFC Lightweight Dustin Poirier proclaimed himself to be a Thugjitsu practitioner in honor of Edwards.

=== Influences ===
Edwards has stated that UFC Hall of Famer Bas Rutten is his idol. Bas Rutten watched Edwards's third pro-MMA fight in 1998, in which Edwards defeated Tim Horton in the first round via TKO. Edwards was invited by Rutten to spend time with him in his car. "Bas is always an awesome guy," said Edwards, "He's cool as hell. One of the nicest guys in the game."

== Personal life ==
Edwards has a daughter and a son.

== Filmography ==
=== Film and documentary ===
Year	Title	Role	Notes
2010	Circle of Pain	Bronner	
2010	Beatdown	Kyle	Stunt performer
2011	Never Back Down 2: The Beatdown		Stunt performer
2011	Warrior	Houston Greggs	
2013	Olympus Has Fallen		Stunt performer
2015	Straight Outta Compton		Stunt performer
2017	Concussed: The American Dream	Himself	Documentary
2020	Bruised	Sport Commentator #1	

=== Television ===
Year	Title	Role	Notes
2016	Westworld		Stunt performer

== Championships and accomplishments ==
- Ultimate Fighting Championship
  - Fight of the Night (Two times) vs. Joe Stevenson and Cody McKenzie
  - Knockout of the Night (One time) vs. Jeremy Stephens
  - Submission of the Night (One time) vs. Cody McKenzie
  - UFC Encyclopedia Awards
    - Fight of the Night (One time) vs. Matt Serra
- HOOKnSHOOT
  - HnS Middleweight Championship (One time)
- MMA Fighting
  - 2004 Knockout of the Year vs. Josh Thomson at UFC 49

== Mixed martial arts record ==
Professional record breakdown
66 matches	42 wins	22 losses
By knockout	17	4
By submission	16	6
By decision	9	12
Draws	1	
No contests	1	

Res.	Record	Opponent	Method	Event	Date	Round	Time	Location	Notes
Loss	42–22–1 (1)	Akbarh Arreola	Submission (armbar)	UFC Fight Night: Edgar vs. Swanson	November 22, 2014	1	1:52	Austin, Texas, United States	
Loss	42–21–1 (1)	Piotr Hallmann	Submission (rear-naked choke)	UFC Fight Night: Henderson vs. Khabilov	June 7, 2014	3	2:31	Albuquerque, New Mexico, United States	
NC	42–20–1 (1)	Yancy Medeiros	No Contest (overturned)	UFC: Fight for the Troops 3	November 6, 2013	1	2:47	Fort Campbell, Kentucky, United States	Originally a KO (punches) loss overturned; Medeiros tested positive for Marijuana
Loss	42–20–1	Daron Cruickshank	Decision (split)	UFC on Fox: Johnson vs. Moraga	July 27, 2013	3	5:00	Seattle, Washington, United States	
Loss	42–19–1	Isaac Vallie-Flagg	Decision (split)	UFC 156	February 2, 2013	3	5:00	Las Vegas, Nevada, United States	
Win	42–18–1	Jeremy Stephens	KO (punches and elbows)	UFC on Fox: Henderson vs. Diaz	December 8, 2012	1	1:55	Seattle, Washington, United States	Knockout of the Night.
Loss	41–18–1	Tony Ferguson	Decision (unanimous)	The Ultimate Fighter 14 Finale	December 3, 2011	3	5:00	Las Vegas, Nevada, United States	
Win	41–17–1	Rafaello Oliveira	TKO (head kick and punches)	UFC Live: Cruz vs. Johnson	October 1, 2011	2	2:44	Washington, D.C., United States	
Loss	40–17–1	Sam Stout	KO (punch)	UFC 131	June 11, 2011	1	3:52	Vancouver, British Columbia, Canada	
Win	40–16–1	Cody McKenzie	Submission (rear-naked choke)	UFC: Fight for the Troops 2	January 22, 2011	2	4:33	Fort Hood, Texas, United States	Fight of the Night, Submission of the Night
Win	39–16–1	John Gunderson	Decision (unanimous)	UFC Fight Night: Marquardt vs. Palhares	September 15, 2010	3	5:00	Austin, Texas, United States	
Win	38–16–1	Luis Palomino	Decision (unanimous)	Bellator 24	August 12, 2010	3	5:00	Hollywood, Florida, United States	
Loss	37–16–1	Mike Campbell	Decision (unanimous)	Moosin: God of Martial Arts	May 21, 2010	3	5:00	Worcester, Massachusetts, United States	
Win	37–15–1	Derrick Noble	TKO (punches)	MFC 24	February 26, 2010	1	4:44	Edmonton, Alberta, Canada	
Win	36–15–1	Kyle Jensen	TKO (punches)	Raging Wolf 5	October 10, 2009	1	2:44	Niagara Falls, New York, United States	
Win	35–15–1	James Warfield	Submission (triangle choke)	Shine Fights 2: American Top Team vs. The World	September 4, 2009	2	4:48	Miami, Florida, United States	
Loss	34–15–1	Duane Ludwig	Decision (unanimous)	Strikeforce: Destruction	November 21, 2008	3	5:00	San Jose, California, United States	160 lb. Catchweight
Loss	34–14–1	K. J. Noons	TKO (punches and elbows)	EliteXC: Return of the King	June 14, 2008	1	0:48	Honolulu, Hawaii, United States	For the EliteXC Lightweight Championship.
Win	34–13–1	James Edson Berto	KO (flying knee)	EliteXC: Street Certified	February 16, 2008	1	4:56	Miami, Florida, United States	
Win	33–13–1	Alonzo Martinez	Submission (rear-naked choke)	HDNet Fights: Reckless Abandon	December 15, 2007	2	3:04	Dallas, Texas, United States	
Win	32–13–1	Nick Gonzalez	Submission (rear-naked choke)	EliteXC: Renegade	November 10, 2007	1	3:05	Corpus Christi, Texas, United States	
Loss	31–13–1	Jorge Masvidal	KO (head kick)	BodogFIGHT: Alvarez vs. Lee	July 14, 2007	2	2:19	Trenton, New Jersey, United States	
Loss	31–12–1	Mike Brown	Decision (unanimous)	BodogFIGHT: St Petersburg	December 16, 2006	3	5:00	St. Petersburg, Russia	
Loss	31–11–1	Joe Stevenson	TKO (doctor stoppage)	UFC 61: Bitter Rivals	July 8, 2006	2	5:00	Las Vegas, Nevada, United States	Fight of the Night; Doctor stoppage due to cut.
Win	31–10–1	Seichi Ikemoto	Decision (unanimous)	Pride - Bushido 10	April 2, 2006	2	5:00	Tokyo, Japan	
Loss	30–10–1	Mark Hominick	Submission (triangle armbar)	UFC 58: USA vs. Canada	March 4, 2006	2	1:52	Las Vegas, Nevada, United States	
Loss	30–9–1	Joachim Hansen	Decision (split)	PRIDE Bushido 9	September 25, 2005	2	5:00	Tokyo, Japan	PRIDE 2005 Lightweight Grand Prix Quarterfinals
Win	30–8–1	Dokonjonosuke Mishima	Submission (armbar)	PRIDE Bushido 7	May 22, 2005	1	4:36	Tokyo, Japan	
Win	29–8–1	Hermes França	Decision (split)	Euphoria: USA vs. World	February 26, 2005	3	5:00	Atlantic City, New Jersey, United States	
Win	28–8–1	Naoyuki Kotani	TKO (head kick and punches)	Euphoria: Road to the Titles	October 15, 2004	1	3:10	Atlantic City, New Jersey, United States	
Win	27–8–1	Josh Thomson	KO (flying head kick and punches)	UFC 49	August 21, 2004	1	4:32	Las Vegas, Nevada, United States	
Win	26–8–1	Hermes Franca	Decision (split)	UFC 47	April 2, 2004	3	5:00	Las Vegas, Nevada, United States	
Win	25–8–1	Deshaun Johnson	Decision (unanimous)	WEC 9	January 16, 2004	3	5:00	Lemoore, California, United States	
Win	24–8–1	Nick Agallar	TKO (punches)	UFC 45	November 21, 2003	2	2:14	Uncasville, Connecticut, United States	
Loss	23–8–1	Tatsuya Kawajiri	Decision (unanimous)	Shooto - 8/10 in Yokohama Cultural Gymnasium	August 10, 2003	3	5:00	Yokohama, Japan	
Win	23–7–1	Eddie Ruiz	Decision (unanimous)	UFC 43	June 6, 2003	3	5:00	Las Vegas, Nevada, United States	
Win	22–7–1	Rich Clementi	Submission (rear-naked choke)	UFC 41	February 28, 2003	3	4:07	Atlantic City, New Jersey, United States	
Win	21–7–1	Kohei Yasumi	KO (punch)	HOOKnSHOOT: New Wind	September 7, 2002	1	1:20	Evansville, Indiana, United States	
Win	20–7–1	Joao Marcos Pierini	TKO (injury)	UFC 37.5	June 22, 2002	1	1:19	Las Vegas, Nevada, United States	
Loss	19–7–1	Caol Uno	Decision (unanimous)	UFC 37	May 10, 2002	3	5:00	Bossier City, Louisiana, United States	
Win	19–6–1	Kultar Gill	Submission (heel hook)	Shogun 1	December 15, 2001	2	2:49	Honolulu, Hawaii, United States	
Loss	18–6–1	Matt Serra	Decision (majority)	UFC 33	September 28, 2001	3	5:00	Las Vegas, Nevada, United States	Welterweight bout
Win	18–5–1	Aaron Riley	Decision (unanimous)	HOOKnSHOOT: Showdown	July 14, 2001	3	5:00	Evansville, Indiana, United States	Won the HnS Welterweight Championship.
Draw	17–5–1	C.J. Fernandes	Draw	HOOKnSHOOT: Masters	May 26, 2001	3	5:00	Evansville, Indiana, United States	
Win	17–5	Jeff Lindsay	KO (kick)	Renegades Extreme Fighting	March 23, 2001	1	1:41	Texas, United States	
Win	16–5	Bone Sayavonga	Submission (rear-naked choke)	Renegades Extreme Fighting	March 23, 2001	1	1:04	Texas, United States	
Loss	15–5	Jeremy Williams	Decision (split)	KOTC 7: Wet and Wild	February 24, 2001	3	5:00	San Jacinto, California, United States	
Win	15–4	David Harris	Submission (armbar)	Bushido 1	January 18, 2001	1	1:15	Tempe, Arizona, United States	
Win	14–4	Scott Bills	TKO (punches)	HOOKnSHOOT: Fusion	November 18, 2000	1	4:31	Evansville, Indiana, United States	
Win	13–4	Danny Bennett	Submission (rear-naked choke)	KOTC 5: Cage Wars	September 16, 2000	1	3:03	San Jacinto, California, United States	
Win	12–4	Pete Spratt	Submission (triangle choke)	Renegades Extreme Fighting	July 15, 2000	1		Texas, United States	
Win	11–4	Cedric Marks	Submission (armbar)	Extreme Shootout	July 15, 2000	1	1:45	Texas, United States	
Win	10–4	Andy Mockler	TKO (punches)	HOOKnSHOOT: Meltdown	June 10, 2000	2	1:32	Evansville, Indiana, United States	
Loss	9–4	Rumina Sato	Submission (rear-naked choke)	SuperBrawl 17	April 15, 2000	1	0:18	Honolulu, Hawaii, United States	
Win	9–3	Stacy Coughlin	TKO (punches)	Armageddon 2	November 23, 1999	1	2:00	Houston, Texas, United States	
Win	8–3	Aaron Riley	Decision (unanimous)	HOOKnSHOOT: Texas Heat	October 2, 1999	1	20:00	Texas, United States	
Win	7–3	Shannon Ritch	Submission (rear-naked choke)	Armageddon 1	August 23, 1999	1	2:39	Houston, Texas, United States	
Loss	6–3	Nate Marquardt	Submission (heel hook)	Bas Rutten Invitational 4	August 14, 1999	1	3:04	United States	
Win	6–2	Anthony Holiday	TKO (submission to knees)	Extreme Shootout	June 25, 1999	1	1:08	McAllen, Texas, United States	
Win	5–2	Thomas Denny	Submission (verbal)	West Coast NHB Championships 2	February 28, 1999	1	3:09	Los Angeles, California, United States	
Win	4–2	Louie Cercedez	TKO (doctor stoppage)	West Coast NHB Championships 1	December 8, 1998	1	3:38	Los Angeles, California, United States	Doctor stoppage due to cut.
Loss	3–2	Fabiano Iha	Submission (armbar)	Extreme Challenge 22	November 21, 1998	1	3:56	West Valley City, Utah, United States	
Win	3–1	Raphael Perlungher	Submission (rear-naked choke)	Power Ring Warriors	November 7, 1998	1	3:25	Humble, Texas, United States	
Win	2–1	Tim Horton	TKO (punches)	World Shoot Wrestling	June 12, 1998	1	9:15	Pasadena, Texas, United States	
Loss	1–1	Joe Hurley	Decision (unanimous)	World Pankration Championships 2	January 16, 1998	1	15:00	Dallas, Texas, United States	
Win	1–0	Todd Justice	Submission (rear-naked choke)	World Pankration Championships 1	October 26, 1997	1	5:46	Texas, United States	
