= Daron Cruickshank =

American mixed martial artist

- Born: Daron Jae Cruickshank; June 11, 1985 (age 41); Westland, Michigan, United States
- Other names: The Detroit Superstar
- Height: 5 ft 8 in (1.73 m)
- Weight: 156 lb (71 kg; 11.1 st)
- Division: Welterweight; Lightweight
- Reach: 72 in (183 cm)
- Fighting out of: Wayne, Michigan, United States
- Team: Michigan Top Team (2013–present)
- Rank: 2nd degree black belt in Taekwondo
- Wrestling: NCAA Division III Wrestler
- Years active: 2008–present

Mixed martial arts record
- Total: 38
- Wins: 23
- By knockout: 14
- By submission: 2
- By decision: 7
- Losses: 14
- By knockout: 2
- By submission: 8
- By decision: 4
- No contests: 1

Other information
- University: Olivet College
- Mixed martial arts record from Sherdog

Daron Jae Cruickshank (born June 11, 1985) is an American mixed martial artist currently competing as a lightweight for the Xtreme Fighting Championships. A professional competitor since 2008, he also formerly competed for the UFC, King of the Cage and was a competitor on The Ultimate Fighter: Live.

== Background ==
Originally from Westland, Michigan, Cruickshank began training in combat sports from a young age. Both of Cruickshank's parents are fourth degree black belts in Taekwondo who ran their own schools. His father is a former mixed martial artist with multiple black belts, while his mother is also a former professional competitor in kickboxing and boxing. Cruickshank is a second-degree black belt in Taekwondo and was also a talented wrestler, having competed in wrestling and also swimming since he was in the eighth grade. He wrestled collegiately, and was a NJCAA national finalist, as well as a two-time NCAA Division III national qualifier at Olivet College where he earned a bachelor's degree in fitness management.

== Mixed martial arts career ==
=== Early career ===
Cruickshank made his amateur debut in August 2008 where he defeated Tom Grisham via KO at XCC 11: Duel in Downriver 2. He then went on to compile an amateur record of 8–1 while capturing two titles.

=== King of the Cage ===
In his professional debut he fought Ricky Stettner at KOTC: Strike Point, where he won by first-round KO.

He fought Bobby Green at KOTC: Imminent Danger for the Junior Welterweight Championship but lost by a guillotine choke in round 2.

=== Bellator Fighting Championships ===
On July 12, 2011, it was announced that Cruickshank signed a contract with Bellator Fighting Championships to fight on their upcoming Summer Series card on July 23. He was to fight Lithuanian fighter Sergej Juskevic but the fight was scrapped at the last minute.

=== The Ultimate Fighter ===
He competed on The Ultimate Fighter: Live, beginning in March, 2012. In the elimination fight, he defeated Drew Dober by unanimous decision to get into the TUF house. Cruickshank was selected third (sixth overall) by Urijah Faber to be part of his team. In the first fight on the show, he was chosen to face James Vick of Team Cruz. Despite controlling much of the action in the opening round, he was knocked out with a knee on a takedown attempt.

=== Ultimate Fighting Championship ===
Cruickshank faced fellow cast member Chris Tickle on June 1, 2012, at The Ultimate Fighter 15 Finale. He won the fight via unanimous decision.

He was expected to take on Henry Martinez on September 1, 2012, at UFC 151. However, after UFC 151 was cancelled, the bout was rescheduled to December 8, 2012, at UFC on Fox 5. He won the fight via knockout in the second round.

He next fought John Makdessi on March 16, 2013, at UFC 158. He lost the fight via unanimous decision. In the final 10 seconds of the Makdessi fight, he had his nose badly injured and wound up having surgery to repair what his doctor called "the worst thing he's ever seen." He underwent the surgery in May 2013.

Cruickshank faced off against Yves Edwards on July 27, 2013, at UFC on Fox 8, replacing an injured Spencer Fisher. He won the fight via split decision in a closely contested fight.

He fought Adriano Martins on November 9, 2013, at UFC Fight Night 32. Martins defeated him via submission in the second round.

Cruickshank faced Mike Rio on January 25, 2014, at UFC on Fox 10. He won the fight by wheel kick to the face and punches at 4:56 of the second round.

He took on Erik Koch on May 10, 2014, at UFC Fight Night 40. Cruickshank, a significant betting underdog, won the fight via TKO due to a kick and punches in the first round.

Cruickshank faced Jorge Masvidal on July 26, 2014, at UFC on Fox 12. He lost the fight via unanimous decision.

He fought Anthony Njokuani on October 4, 2014, at UFC Fight Night: MacDonald vs. Saffiedine. He won the fight by unanimous decision.

Cruickshank faced K. J. Noons on December 12, 2014, at The Ultimate Fighter 20 Finale. After a back-and-forth first round, the fight was stopped in the second round when Cruickshank received a second inadvertent eye poke and was unable to continue. Because they had not reached the third round, the fight was declared a No Contest.

He fought Beneil Dariush on March 14, 2015, at UFC 185. He missed weight and was fined 20 percent of his purse, which went to Dariush. He lost the fight via submission in the second round.

Cruickshank took on James Krause on July 25, 2015, at UFC on Fox 16. He lost the fight by submission in the first round.

He faced Paul Felder on January 17, 2016, at UFC Fight Night 81. He lost the fight via submission in the third round.

After losing three straight fights, he was released from his UFC contract on March 1, 2016.

=== Rizin FF ===
In March 2016, it was announced that Cruickshank had signed with Rizin Fighting Federation. He made his debut against Shinji Sasaki on April 17, 2016, and won the fight via TKO due to soccer kicks in the first round.

In his second fight for the promotion, he faced Dutch kickboxer Andy Souwer on September 25, 2016. He won via submission due to a rear-naked choke in the first round.

He was expected to face Chris Brown at WXC 77 on April 24, 2019. However, Brown missed the contracted weight and Cruickshank declined to proceed to the bout.

Cruickshank faced Tofiq Musayev at Rizin 16 - Kobe on June 2, 2019. He lost the fight via unanimous decision.

He fought Goiti Yamauchi at Bellator & Rizin: Japan on December 29, 2019. He lost the fight via a rear-naked choke submission in the first round.

=== Post-Rizin ===
While still being under contract with Rizin but unable to enter Japan due to the COVID-19 pandemic, Cruickshank signed a one-fight contract with Taura MMA. In his promotional debut, he took on Deivison Ribeiro at Taura MMA 11 on October 30, 2020. He won the fight via unanimous decision.

Cruickshank faced Guilherme Faria on August 6, 2021, at XFC 45. He lost the bout via split decision.

== Personal life ==
In 2013, he founded Michigan Top Team in co-operation with Jason Fischer.

== Mixed martial arts record ==
Professional record breakdown
38 matches	23 wins	14 losses
By knockout	14	2
By submission	2	8
By decision	7	4
No contests	1	

Res.	Record	Opponent	Method	Event	Date	Round	Time	Location	Notes
Loss	23–14 (1)	Guilherme Faria	Decision (split)	XFC 45	August 6, 2021	3	5:00	Grand Rapids, Michigan, United States	Featherweight debut.
Win	23–13 (1)	Deivison Ribeiro	Decision (unanimous)	Taura MMA 11	October 30, 2020	3	5:00	Kissimmee, Florida, United States	
Loss	22–13 (1)	Goiti Yamauchi	Submission (rear-naked choke)	Bellator 237	December 29, 2019	1	3:11	Saitama, Japan	Catchweight (157.8 lb) bout; Yamauchi missed weight.
Loss	22–12 (1)	Tofiq Musayev	Decision (unanimous)	Rizin 16	June 2, 2019	3	5:00	Kobe, Japan	
Loss	22–11 (1)	Damien Brown	Submission (guillotine choke)	Rizin 14	December 31, 2018	1	4:19	Saitama, Japan	
Win	22–10 (1)	Diego Brandão	KO (flying knee)	Rizin 13	September 30, 2018	2	0:17	Saitama, Japan	
Win	21–10 (1)	Tom Santos	TKO (submission to elbows)	Rizin 11	July 29, 2018	3	4:11	Saitama, Japan	
Win	20–10 (1)	Koshi Matsumoto	KO (head kick)	Rizin 10	May 6, 2018	1	3:58	Fukuoka, Japan	
Win	19–10 (1)	Alexander Trevino	TKO (head kick and punches)	KnockOut Promotions 58	September 30, 2017	1	2:02	Grand Rapids, Michigan, United States	Catchweight (160 lb) bout.
Loss	18–10 (1)	Yusuke Yachi	KO (punch)	Rizin 2017 in Yokohama: Sakura	April 16, 2017	1	5:10	Yokohama, Japan	
Loss	18–9 (1)	Satoru Kitaoka	Technical Submission (guillotine choke)	Rizin World Grand Prix 2016: 2nd Round	December 29, 2016	1	8:18	Saitama, Japan	
Win	18–8 (1)	Andy Souwer	Submission (rear-naked choke)	Rizin World Grand Prix 2016: 1st Round	September 25, 2016	1	4:10	Saitama, Japan	
Win	17–8 (1)	Shinji Sasaki	TKO (soccer kicks)	Rizin 1	April 4, 2016	1	4:36	Nagoya, Japan	
Loss	16–8 (1)	Paul Felder	Submission (rear-naked choke)	UFC Fight Night: Dillashaw vs. Cruz	January 17, 2016	3	3:56	Boston, Massachusetts, United States	
Loss	16–7 (1)	James Krause	Submission (rear-naked choke)	UFC on Fox: Dillashaw vs. Barão 2	July 25, 2015	1	1:27	Chicago, Illinois, United States	
Loss	16–6 (1)	Beneil Dariush	Submission (rear-naked choke)	UFC 185	March 14, 2015	2	2:48	Dallas, Texas, United States	Catchweight (157 lb) bout; Cruickshank missed weight.
NC	16–5 (1)	K. J. Noons	NC (accidental eye poke)	The Ultimate Fighter: A Champion Will Be Crowned Finale	December 12, 2014	2	0:25	Las Vegas, Nevada, United States	Accidental eye poke rendered Cruickshank unable to continue.
Win	16–5	Anthony Njokuani	Decision (unanimous)	UFC Fight Night: MacDonald vs. Saffiedine	October 4, 2014	3	5:00	Halifax, Nova Scotia, Canada	
Loss	15–5	Jorge Masvidal	Decision (unanimous)	UFC on Fox: Lawler vs. Brown	July 26, 2014	3	5:00	San Jose, California, United States	
Win	15–4	Erik Koch	TKO (head kick and punches)	UFC Fight Night: Brown vs. Silva	May 10, 2014	1	3:21	Cincinnati, Ohio, United States	
Win	14–4	Mike Rio	TKO (spinning wheel kick and punches)	UFC on Fox: Henderson vs. Thomson	January 25, 2014	2	4:56	Chicago, Illinois, United States	
Loss	13–4	Adriano Martins	Submission (straight armbar)	UFC Fight Night: Belfort vs. Henderson	November 9, 2013	2	2:49	Goiânia, Brazil	
Win	13–3	Yves Edwards	Decision (split)	UFC on Fox: Johnson vs. Moraga	July 27, 2013	3	5:00	Seattle, Washington, United States	
Loss	12–3	John Makdessi	Decision (unanimous)	UFC 158	March 16, 2013	3	5:00	Montreal, Quebec, Canada	
Win	12–2	Henry Martinez	KO (head kick)	UFC on Fox: Henderson vs. Diaz	December 8, 2012	2	2:57	Seattle, Washington, United States	Catchweight (158 lbs) bout; Martinez missed weight.
Win	11–2	Chris Tickle	Decision (unanimous)	The Ultimate Fighter: Live Finale	June 1, 2012	3	5:00	Las Vegas, Nevada, United States	Tickle was deducted one point in round 1 due to an illegal upkick.
Win	10–2	Jesse Gross	TKO (punches and elbows)	Score Fighting Series 3	December 3, 2011	1	1:39	Sarnia, Ontario, Canada	Catchweight (163 lb) bout.
Win	9–2	Mike Ricci	Decision (unanimous)	Ringside MMA 12	October 21, 2011	5	5:00	Montreal, Quebec, Canada	Won the vacant Ringside MMA Lightweight Championship.
Win	8–2	Brad Cardinal	TKO (punches)	Slammer in the Hammer 1	June 17, 2011	1	4:35	Hamilton, Ontario, Canada	Lightweight debut; Cruickshank missed weight (159 lb).
Win	7–2	Tiawan Howard	Decision (split)	Bobish's Ultimate Cage Battles: Stars and Stripes	April 9, 2011	3	5:00	Parma, Ohio, United States	Catchweight (175 lb) bout.
Loss	6–2	Luis Palomino	KO (head kick and punches)	G-Force Fights: Bad Blood 5	February 26, 2011	1	3:52	Grand Rapids, Michigan, United States	
Win	6–1	Anthony Smith	TKO (punches)	KOTC: Civil War 2	September 11, 2010	1	1:52	Royal Oak, Michigan, United States	
Loss	5–1	Bobby Green	Submission (guillotine choke)	KOTC: Imminent Danger	August 13, 2010	2	2:39	Mescalero, New Mexico, United States	For the KOTC Light Welterweight Championship.
Win	5–0	Jason Holmes	Decision (split)	KOTC: Bad Boys II	April 16, 2010	3	5:00	Detroit, Michigan, United States	
Win	4–0	Raul Mandez	KO (punches)	KOTC: Upper Cut	March 13, 2010	1	2:19	Laughlin, Nevada, United States	
Win	3–0	Dominic Deshazor	TKO (punches)	XCC: Beatdown at the Ballroom 9	March 6, 2010	1	1:25	Mt. Clemens, Michigan, United States	
Win	2–0	Brett Biederman	Submission (rear-naked choke)	XCC: Rumble in Royal Oak 5	January 16, 2010	2	2:58	Royal Oak, Michigan, United States	
Win	1–0	Ricky Stettner	KO (spinning back fist)	KOTC: Strike Point	October 10, 2009	1	2:23	Lac du Flambeau, Wisconsin, United States	Welterweight debut.

=== Mixed martial arts exhibition record ===
Exhibition record breakdown		
2 matches	1 win	1 loss
By knockout	0	1
By decision	1	0

Res.	Record	Opponent	Method	Event	Date	Round	Time	Location	Notes
Loss	1–1	James Vick	KO (knee)	The Ultimate Fighter: Live	March 16, 2012 (airdate)	1	2:16	Las Vegas, Nevada, United States	The Ultimate Fighter: Live Preliminary round.
Win	1–0	Drew Dober	Decision (unanimous)	The Ultimate Fighter: Live	March 9, 2012 (airdate)	1	5:00	Las Vegas, Nevada, United States	The Ultimate Fighter: Live Elimination round.

== See also ==
- List of male mixed martial artists
