= Michael Kuiper =

Dutch mixed martial arts fighter

- Born: 7 June 1989 (age 37); Riel, Netherlands
- Other names: Judo
- Nationality: Dutch
- Height: 6 ft 1 in (1.85 m)
- Weight: 185 lb (84 kg; 13.2 st)
- Division: Light Heavyweight; Middleweight
- Reach: 73.0 in (185 cm)
- Fighting out of: Tilburg, Netherlands
- Team: Team Topfighter Belgium
- Rank: Purple belt in Brazilian Jiu-Jitsu; Black belt in Judo
- Years active: 2009–present

Mixed martial arts record
- Total: 22
- Wins: 15
- By knockout: 9
- By submission: 5
- By decision: 1
- Losses: 7
- By knockout: 1
- By submission: 5
- By decision: 1

Other information
- Website: www.teamtopfighter.com
- Mixed martial arts record from Sherdog
- Last updated on: 14 January 2015

Michael Jan Hugo Kuiper (born 7 June 1989) is a Dutch mixed martial artist who most recently competed in the Light Heavyweight division. A professional competitor since 2009, he has competed for the UFC and Titan FC.

== Mixed martial arts career ==
=== Early career ===
Kuiper comes from a judo background and holds a black belt in the discipline. He made his mixed martial arts debut in February 2009 and defeated his opponent, Ahmed Sultan, with a triangle choke. He went on to have a further six fights that same year, winning all of them in the first or second round. In 2009 he won the Belgium MMA title, and was rewarded with the MMA fighter of the year 2009.

After defeating David Marcina on 20 November 2010, he was set to return to the cage on 4 December 2010 to face Welsh boxer John Phillips at BAMMA 5: The Beast vs. Crazy Bear in Newcastle, England. But due to snowstorms in the UK the event was cancelled.

=== Ultimate Fighting Championship ===
In his UFC debut Kuiper faced Rafael Natal on 4 February 2012 at UFC 143. He lost the back-and-forth fight via unanimous decision.

Kuiper faced Jared Hamman on 11 August 2012 at UFC 150. Kuiper defeated Hamman via second-round TKO.

Kuiper was expected to face Thiago Perpetuo on 19 January 2013 at UFC on FX 7. However, Perpetuo suffered an injury and was replaced by Caio Magalhaes. On 27 December, it was announced that Magalhaes had also pulled out of the bout and that Kuiper would be shifted to UFC on Fox 6 on 26 January 2013 to face Buddy Roberts. It was then announced on 8 January that Roberts had been forced out of the bout with an illness and was replaced by promotional newcomer Josh Janousek. Then just days before the event, Janousek himself pulled out of the bout citing an injury. With no time to find a suitable replacement for Kuiper, he was pulled from the event as well. This meant that 4 potential opponents for Kuiper (Perpetuo, Magalhaes, Roberts and Janousek) had all pulled out of the proposed bout.

Kuiper next faced Tom Lawlor on 6 April 2013 at UFC on Fuel TV 9. He lost via submission early in the second round.

Kuiper faced Brad Scott on 26 October 2013 at UFC Fight Night 30. He lost the fight via front choke submission in the first round, and was subsequently released from the promotion shortly after.

=== Titan FC ===
Kuiper fought fellow former UFC fighter Matt Riddle in the co-main event of Titan FC 27 on 28 February 2014. Kuiper lost by guillotine choke in the second round.

== Mixed martial arts record ==
Professional record breakdown
22 matches	15 wins	7 losses
By knockout	9	1
By submission	5	5
By decision	1	1

Res.	Record	Opponent	Method	Event	Date	Round	Time	Location	Notes
Loss	15–7	Rodrigo Carlos	Submission (keylock)	Caribbean FC 10	9 November 2024	1	4:50	Oranjestad, Aruba	
Loss	15–6	Adrick Croes	Submission (rear-naked choke)	Caribbean FC 5	7 April 2018	1	N/A	Oranjestad, Aruba	Light Heavyweight debut.
Win	15–5	Cristiano Machado	Submission (rear-naked choke)	Caribbean FC 4	26 May 2017	1	2:46	Oranjestad, Aruba	
Win	14–5	Oktay Karatas	TKO (punches)	Battle Events: Amersfoort	4 June 2016	1	4:34	Amersfoort, Netherlands	
Loss	13–5	Gregory Milliard	TKO (punches)	Redemption FC 2	29 April 2016	3	2:48	Oranjestad, Aruba	Catchweight (190 lb) bout.
Win	13–4	Lutciano Zimmerman	KO (punches)	Strength and Honour 10	4 October 2014	1	N/A	Dessel, Belgium	
Loss	12–4	Matt Riddle	Submission (guillotine choke)	Titan FC 27	28 February 2014	2	2:29	Kansas City, Kansas, United States	
Loss	12–3	Brad Scott	Submission (guillotine choke)	UFC Fight Night: Machida vs. Munoz	26 October 2013	1	4:17	Manchester, England	
Loss	12–2	Tom Lawlor	Submission (guillotine choke)	UFC on Fuel TV: Mousasi vs. Latifi	6 April 2013	2	1:05	Stockholm, Sweden	
Win	12–1	Jared Hamman	TKO (punches)	UFC 150	11 August 2012	2	2:16	Denver, Colorado, United States	
Loss	11–1	Rafael Natal	Decision (unanimous)	UFC 143	4 February 2012	3	5:00	Las Vegas, Nevada, United States	
Win	11–0	Morris Cilfoni	TKO (punches)	Milano in the Cage 1	7 May 2011	1	N/A	Milan, Italy	
Win	10–0	Clearance Noordzee	KO (punches)	Staredown FC 5	19 March 2011	1	N/A	Deurne, Belgium	
Win	9–0	David Marcina	TKO (punches)	Live 2 Fight	20 November 2010	1	2:14	Mallorca, Spain	
Win	8–0	Baudin Egoluev	Submission (armbar)	Ultimate Takedown 2	6 November 2010	2	2:42	Herstal, Belgium	
Win	7–0	Ivan Brguljan	TKO (punches)	One Gate 2 Far	7 November 2009	1	N/A	Heerlen, Netherlands	
Win	6–0	Patrice Wagemans	KO (punch)	Strength and Honour 5	3 October 2009	1	0:10	Dessel, Belgium	
Win	5–0	Bert Van Geystelen	Submission (armbar)	Bulls Gym Gala	30 May 2009	2	N/A	Putte, Belgium	
Win	4–0	Saigan Muradov	TKO (punches)	The Battle of Akersloot	10 May 2009	N/A	N/A	Akersloot, Netherlands	
Win	3–0	Bert Van Geystelen	Submission (armbar)	Staredown FC 1	26 April 2009	1	N/A	Antwerp, Belgium	
Win	2–0	Kevin Goodliff	Decision (unanimous)	Battle of South 7	11 April 2009	2	5:00	Hoensbroek, Netherlands	
Win	1–0	Ahmed Sultan	Submission (triangle choke)	Outsider Cup 12	14 February 2009	2	4:00	Mülheim an der Ruhr, Germany	Middleweight debut.
