= UFC on Fox: Shogun vs. Vera =

UFC mixed martial arts event in 2012

- The poster for UFC on Fox: Shogun vs. Vera
- Promotion: Ultimate Fighting Championship
- Date: August 4, 2012
- Venue: Staples Center
- City: Los Angeles, California
- Attendance: 16,080
- Total gate: $1,100,000

Event chronology
| UFC 149: Faber vs. Barao | UFC on Fox: Shogun vs. Vera | UFC 150: Henderson vs. Edgar II |

UFC on Fox: Shogun vs. Vera (also known as UFC on Fox 4) was a mixed martial arts event held by the Ultimate Fighting Championship on August 4, 2012 at Staples Center in Los Angeles, California.

== Background ==
Brian Stann was expected to headline the event against promotional newcomer Héctor Lombard. However, Stann was forced out of the bout citing a shoulder injury.

A light heavyweight bout between former UFC Light Heavyweight Champion Maurício Rua and Brandon Vera instead headlined the event, with both fighters being pulled from fights on earlier cards.

Chad Griggs was expected to face Phil Davis at the event. However, Griggs was forced out of the bout with an injury and replaced by promotional newcomer Wagner Prado.

A featherweight bout between Josh Grispi and Pablo Garza was scheduled to take place at the event. However, Garza was forced to withdraw from the fight and was replaced by Rani Yahya.

A lightweight bout between Joe Lauzon and Terry Etim was scheduled to take place at the event. However, Etim was forced to withdraw from the fight and was replaced by Jamie Varner.

Rob Broughton was expected to face Matt Mitrione at the event. However, the bout was scrapped after Broughton pulled out due to an undisclosed personal matter.

On July 25, 2012, Ben Rothwell pulled out of his fight against Travis Browne due to an injured ankle. This led to Browne being removed from the card, while Mike Swick vs DaMarques Johnson was bumped up to the main card.

== Results ==
Main card (Fox)
| Weight class | | | | Method | Round | Time | Notes |
|---|---|---|---|---|---|---|---|
| Light Heavyweight | Maurício Rua | def. | Brandon Vera | TKO (punches) | 4 | 4:09 |
| Light Heavyweight | Lyoto Machida | def. | Ryan Bader | KO (punch) | 2 | 1:32 |
| Lightweight | Joe Lauzon | def. | Jamie Varner | Submission (triangle choke) | 3 | 2:44 |
| Welterweight | Mike Swick | def. | DaMarques Johnson | KO (punches) | 2 | 1:20 |
Preliminary card (Fuel TV)
| Featherweight | Nam Phan | def. | Cole Miller | Decision (split) (29–28, 28–29, 29–28) | 3 | 5:00 |
| Light Heavyweight | Wagner Prado | vs. | Phil Davis | No Contest | 1 | 1:28 | (Note: An accidental eye poke left Prado unable to continue.) |
| Featherweight | Rani Yahya | def. | Josh Grispi | Submission (north-south choke) | 1 | 3:15 |
| Heavyweight | Phil De Fries | def. | Oli Thompson | Submission (face crank) | 2 | 4:16 |
| Featherweight | Manny Gamburyan | def. | Michihiro Omigawa | Decision (unanimous) (29–28, 29–28, 30–27) | 3 | 5:00 |
| Flyweight | John Moraga | def. | Ulysses Gomez | KO (elbows and punches) | 1 | 3:46 |

== Bonus Awards ==
The following fighters received $50,000 bonuses.

- Fight of the Night: Joe Lauzon vs. Jamie Varner
- Knockout of the Night: Mike Swick
- Submission of the Night: Joe Lauzon

== Reported Payout ==
The following is the reported payout to the fighters as reported to the California State Athletic Commission. It does not include sponsor money and also does not include the UFC's traditional "fight night" bonuses.

- Maurício Rua: $240,000 (includes $70,000 win bonus) def. Brandon Vera: $70,000
- Lyoto Machida: $200,000 (no win bonus) def. Ryan Bader: $47,000
- Joe Lauzon: $48,000 (includes $24,000 win bonus) def. Jamie Varner: $12,000
- Mike Swick: $86,000 (includes $43,000 win bonus) def. DaMarques Johnson: $18,000
- Nam Phan: $20,000 (includes $10,000 win bonus) def. Cole Miller: $21,000
- Phil Davis: $30,000 vs. Wagner Prado: $16,000
- Rani Yahya: $24,000 (includes $12,000 win bonus) def. Josh Grispi: $15,000
- Phil De Fries: $32,000 (includes $16,000 win bonus) def. Oli Thompson: $11,000
- Manvel Gamburyan: $36,000 (includes $18,000 win bonus) def. Michihiro Omigawa: $11,000
- John Moraga: $18,000 (includes $9,000 win bonus) def. Ulysses Gomez: $8,000

== See also ==
- List of UFC events
- 2012 in UFC
