= UFC on FX: Guillard vs. Miller =

UFC mixed martial arts event in 2012

- The poster for UFC on FX: Guillard vs. Miller
- Promotion: Ultimate Fighting Championship
- Date: January 20, 2012
- Venue: Bridgestone Arena
- City: Nashville, Tennessee
- Attendance: 7,728
- Total gate: $334,860

Event chronology
UFC 142: Aldo vs. Mendes	UFC on FX: Guillard vs. Miller	UFC on Fox: Evans vs. Davis

UFC on FX: Guillard vs. Miller (also known as UFC on FX 1) was a mixed martial arts event held by the Ultimate Fighting Championship on January 20, 2012 at the Bridgestone Arena in Nashville, Tennessee.

== Background ==
The event was the second to be broadcast as part of a seven-year agreement between the UFC and Fox, and the inaugural event to air on FX.

The UFC's second announce team made their debut at this event, featuring former Bellator announcer Jon Anik on play-by-play and UFC lightweight Kenny Florian on color commentary. Anik and Florian had previously worked together as hosts of the ESPN2 series MMA Live.

A featherweight bout between Charles Oliveira and Robert Peralta was briefly linked to this event, but it was later confirmed that Oliveira would instead be facing Eric Wisely a week later at UFC on Fox: Evans vs. Davis.

Rafaello Oliveira was expected to fight Reza Madadi at the event. However, after a hand injury, Oliveira pulled out of the bout and was replaced by Fabrício Camões. Madadi would later withdraw from the bout due to injury as well and was replaced by promotional newcomer Tommy Hayden.

Mike Brown was expected to face Vagner Rocha, but was forced out of the bout with an injury. Rocha will instead face Jonathan Brookins at UFC on Fuel TV 1.

Ken Stone was expected to fight Mike Easton at this event, but was forced from the bout due to injury and replaced by promotional newcomer Jared Papazian.

UFC newcomer Ryan Jimmo was expected to face Karlos Vemola at this event, but the bout was cancelled after Jimmo fell injured a week prior to the event.

This event featured the UFC debut of future UFC Lightweight Champion Khabib Nurmagomedov.

The preliminary card aired on Fuel TV.

== Results ==
Main card (FX)
Weight class				Method	Round	Time	Notes
Lightweight	Jim Miller	def.	Melvin Guillard	Submission (rear-naked choke)	1	3:04
Welterweight	Josh Neer	def.	Duane Ludwig	Technical Submission (guillotine choke)	1	3:04
Bantamweight	Mike Easton	def.	Jared Papazian	Decision (majority) (29–28, 30–27, 29–29)	3	5:00
Heavyweight	Pat Barry	def.	Christian Morecraft	KO (punches)	1	3:38
Preliminary Card (Fuel TV)
Middleweight	Jorge Rivera	def.	Eric Schafer	TKO (punches)	2	1:31
Lightweight	Khabib Nurmagomedov	def.	Kamal Shalorus	Submission (rear-naked choke)	3	2:08
Welterweight	Charlie Brenneman	def.	Daniel Roberts	Decision (unanimous) (30–27, 30–27, 29–28)	3	5:00
Lightweight	Fabrício Camões	def.	Tommy Hayden	Submission (rear-naked choke)	1	4:03
Featherweight	Daniel Pineda	def.	Pat Schilling	Submission (rear-naked choke)	1	1:37
Bantamweight	Nick Denis	def.	Joseph Sandoval	KO (elbows)	1	0:22	(Note: This bout aired on the broadcast following the Miller vs Guillard bout.)

== Bonus awards ==
The following fighters received $45,000 bonuses.

- Fight of the Night: Pat Barry vs. Christian Morecraft
- Knockout of the Night: Nick Denis
- Submission of the Night: Jim Miller

== See also ==
- List of UFC events
- 2012 in UFC
