= Jeff Hougland =

American mixed martial arts fighter

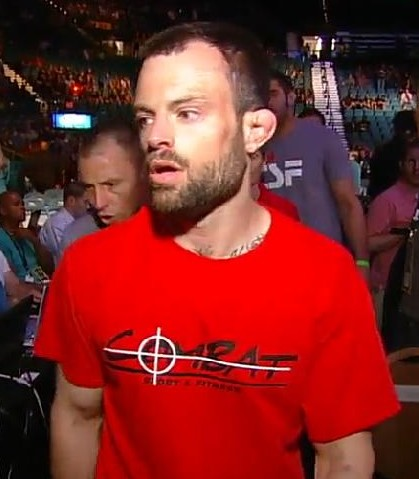
- Born: Jeffery Ryan Hougland; August 2, 1978 (age 48); Chicago, Illinois, United States
- Other names: Hellbound
- Height: 5 ft 9 in (175 cm)
- Weight: 135 lb (61 kg; 9.6 st)
- Division: Lightweight; Featherweight; Bantamweight
- Reach: 68 in (173 cm)
- Stance: Orthodox
- Fighting out of: Enumclaw, Washington, United States
- Team: Combat Sport and Fitness
- Rank: Black belt in Brazilian Jiu-Jitsu
- Years active: 2002–2003, 2005–2006, 2010–2012

Mixed martial arts record
- Total: 16
- Wins: 10
- By knockout: 1
- By submission: 7
- By decision: 2
- Losses: 6
- By knockout: 1
- By submission: 3
- By decision: 2

Other information
- Mixed martial arts record from Sherdog

Jeffery Ryan Hougland (born August 2, 1978) is a retired American professional mixed martial artist. A professional from 2002 until 2012, he competed for the UFC and WEC.

== Mixed martial arts career ==
=== Early career ===
Hougland started fighting professionally in 2002. He fought once for World Extreme Cagefighting (WEC) at WEC 6 and lost to future Strikeforce Lightweight Champion Gilbert Melendez via second-round TKO. After losing his next fight, he won eight fights in a row. He then signed with the UFC.

=== Ultimate Fighting Championship ===
Hougland made his promotional debut at UFC 132 against fellow UFC newcomer Donny Walker. Hougland showed off an excellent ground game with multiple submission attempts throughout all three rounds. Hougland won the fight via unanimous decision (29-28, 29-28, 30-27).

Hougland's second UFC outing was expected to take place against Mike Easton on October 1, 2011, at UFC on Versus 6. However, Hougland was forced out of the bout with an injury and replaced by Byron Bloodworth.

Hougland was briefly linked to a bout against Renan Barão on July 7, 2012, at UFC 148. However, Hougland served as a replacement for Mike Easton and faced Yves Jabouin on May 15, 2012, at UFC on Fuel TV: Korean Zombie vs. Poirier. Hougland lost the fight via unanimous decision after getting dominated by Jabouin's superior standup.

He was expected to face Takeya Mizugaki at UFC 151 on September 1, 2012. However, after UFC 151 was cancelled, his bout with Mizugaki was rescheduled for November 10, 2012, at UFC on Fuel TV 6. Hougland was dominated for all three rounds, losing via unanimous decision (30-25, 30-27, 30-27). Hougland was subsequently released from the promotion.

== Mixed martial arts record ==
Professional record breakdown
| 16 matches | 10 wins | 6 losses |
| By knockout | 1 | 1 |
| By submission | 7 | 3 |
| By decision | 2 | 2 |

| Res. | Record | Opponent | Method | Event | Date | Round | Time | Location | Notes |
|---|---|---|---|---|---|---|---|---|---|
| Loss | 10–6 | Takeya Mizugaki | Decision (unanimous) | UFC on Fuel TV: Franklin vs. Le | November 10, 2012 | 3 | 5:00 | Macau, SAR, China | |
| Loss | 10–5 | Yves Jabouin | Decision (unanimous) | UFC on Fuel TV: Korean Zombie vs. Poirier | May 15, 2012 | 3 | 5:00 | Fairfax, Virginia, United States | |
| Win | 10–4 | Donny Walker | Decision (unanimous) | UFC 132 | July 2, 2011 | 3 | 5:00 | Las Vegas, Nevada, United States | Bantamweight debut. |
| Win | 9–4 | Craig Ross | Submission (guillotine choke) | Rumble on the Ridge 18 | May 14, 2011 | 1 | 1:06 | Snoqualmie, Washington, United States | |
| Win | 8–4 | Omar Avelar | Submission (rear-naked choke) | Rumble on the Ridge 16 | January 15, 2011 | 1 | 3:45 | Snoqualmie, Washington, United States | |
| Win | 7–4 | Jeremy Burnett | Submission (armbar) | ROTR 13: Redemption | September 25, 2010 | 1 | 3:34 | Snoqualmie, Washington, United States | |
| Win | 6–4 | Roy Bradshaw | Submission (rear-naked choke) | Rumble on the Ridge 11 | July 10, 2010 | 1 | 1:25 | Snoqualmie, Washington, United States | |
| Win | 5–4 | Rusty Simpson | TKO (punches) | IFC Warriors Challenge 21 | June 3, 2006 | 1 | 0:53 | Tuolumne, California, United States | |
| Win | 4–4 | Josh Gardner | Decision | GC 48: All Stars | August 20, 2005 | 2 | 5:00 | Porterville, California, United States | |
| Win | 3–4 | Chris McMillen | Submission (armbar) | GC 37: Throwdown | May 15, 2005 | 1 | 1:55 | Porterville, California, United States | |
| Win | 2–4 | Julian Samaniego | Submission (armbar) | GC 35: Cold Fury | March 13, 2005 | 2 | 0:52 | Porterville, California, United States | |
| Loss | 1–4 | Glen Cordoza | Submission (rear-naked choke) | IFC WC 18: Big Valley Brawl | July 19, 2003 | 1 | 1:53 | Lakeport, California, United States | |
| Loss | 1–3 | Gilbert Melendez | TKO (punches) | WEC 6: Return of a Legend | March 27, 2003 | 2 | 2:05 | Lemoore, California, United States | |
| Loss | 1–2 | Randy Spence | Submission (armbar) | IFC: Night of the Warriors 3 | November 16, 2002 | 1 | 2:44 | Ione, California, United States | |
| Loss | 1–1 | Mike Penalber | Submission (heel hook) | UA 4: King of the Mountain | September 28, 2002 | 1 | 3:53 | Auberry, California, United States | |
| Win | 1–0 | Rusty Simpson | Submission (rear-naked choke) | IFC: Warriors Challenge 17 | July 12, 2002 | 1 | 4:11 | Porterville, California, United States | |
