= UFC 152 =

UFC mixed martial arts event in 2012

UFC 152: Jones vs. Belfort
- The poster for UFC 152: Jones vs. Belfort
- Promotion: Ultimate Fighting Championship
- Date: September 22, 2012
- Venue: Air Canada Centre
- City: Toronto, Ontario, Canada
- Attendance: 16,800
- Total gate: $1,921,000

Event chronology
UFC 151: Jones vs. Henderson	UFC 152: Jones vs. Belfort	UFC on Fuel TV: Struve vs. Miocic

UFC 152: Jones vs. Belfort was a mixed martial arts pay-per-view event held by the Ultimate Fighting Championship on September 22, 2012, at the Air Canada Centre in Toronto, Ontario, Canada.

== Background ==
Rory MacDonald was expected to face former dual-division champion B.J. Penn at the event, but MacDonald pulled out of the bout after sustaining a cut to the forehead while training. The bout was rescheduled for UFC on Fox 5 on December 8, 2012.

UFC newcomer Roger Hollett was expected to face Matt Hamill, who returned from retirement, at the event. However, Hollett was forced out of the bout due to a contract dispute and replaced by Vladimir Matyushenko. Then, on September 11, 2012, Matyushenko pulled out of the fight after suffering a torn Achilles tendon while training, and Hamill vs. Hollett was rebooked by UFC officials.

A bout between Evan Dunham and T. J. Grant was originally supposed to be contested on the main card but was instead fought on the FX prelims, for unknown reasons.

As a result of the cancellation of UFC 151, a bout between Kyle Noke and Charlie Brenneman was rescheduled for this event.

Dan Miller was expected to face Sean Pierson at the event. However, Miller pulled out of the bout after getting news about his son's kidney transplant operation. He was replaced by Lance Benoist.

At the weigh-ins, Charles Oliveira failed to make weight by four tenths of pound on his first try. In the second, he was able to make 146.2 lb. However, his opponent signed to fight at a catchweight, and Oliveira was not fined.

=== Main event ===
The main event was UFC Light Heavyweight Champion Jon Jones facing former champion Vitor Belfort. Originally, Jones was set to defend his title against Dan Henderson at UFC 151 on September 1, 2012, in Las Vegas, Nevada, but UFC President Dana White announced on August 23, 2012, that Henderson had a tear in his MCL and would not be able to compete. It was then revealed that Jones declined a fight against Chael Sonnen, who offered to take the fight on eight days notice. As a result, the event was cancelled. This marked the first time the UFC had cancelled an event, with the official fight card having been announced, in the organization's history.

"Here I am with 35 years old, 17 years into my career, fighting the best fighter of all-time, in the history of the UFC, a guy who's [considered] the best athlete in MMA."

— Vitor Belfort.

Following the cancellation of the event, White said that UFC 151 simply will not exist. Jones was set to face Lyoto Machida in a rematch at this event after the cancellation of that event, but Machida declined the fight. Subsequently, Belfort was chosen to take Machida's place. Jones was a massive favorite coming into the bout. It was later reported that Belfort fought Jones with a broken hand. He also had elevated free testosterone levels found on a pre-fight test

== Results ==
Main Card
Weight class				Method	Round	Time	Notes
Light Heavyweight	Jon Jones (c)	def.	Vitor Belfort	Submission (americana)	4	0:54	(Note: For the UFC Light Heavyweight Championship.)
Flyweight	Demetrious Johnson	def.	Joseph Benavidez	Decision (split) (48–47, 47–48, 49–46)	5	5:00	(Note: Flyweight Tournament Final to determine the inaugural UFC Flyweight Champion.)
Middleweight	Michael Bisping	def.	Brian Stann	Decision (unanimous) (29–28, 29–28, 29–28)	3	5:00
Light Heavyweight	Matt Hamill	def.	Roger Hollett	Decision (unanimous) (29–28, 30–27, 30–27)	3	5:00
Catchweight (146.2 lb)	Cub Swanson	def.	Charles Oliveira	KO (punch)	1	2:40
Preliminary Card (FX and Sportsnet)
Light Heavyweight	Vinny Magalhães	def.	Igor Pokrajac	Submission (armbar)	2	1:14
Lightweight	T. J. Grant	def.	Evan Dunham	Decision (unanimous) (29–28, 30–27, 29–28)	3	5:00
Welterweight	Sean Pierson	def.	Lance Benoist	Decision (unanimous) (29–28, 29–28, 29–28)	3	5:00
Featherweight	Marcus Brimage	def.	Jimy Hettes	Decision (unanimous) (29–28, 29–28, 29–28)	3	5:00
Preliminary Card (Facebook)
Welterweight	Seth Baczynski	def.	Simeon Thoresen	KO (punch)	1	4:10
Bantamweight	Mitch Gagnon	def.	Walel Watson	Submission (rear-naked choke)	1	1:09
Welterweight	Kyle Noke	def.	Charlie Brenneman	TKO (punches)	1	0:45	(Note: This bout aired on the broadcast following the Jones vs Belfort bout.)

== Flyweight Championship bracket ==
Semifinals; UFC on FX 2 / UFC on FX 3
(United States)	Joseph Benavidez	TKO
(Japan)	Yasuhiro Urushitani	2
(United States)	Demetrious Johnson^{1}	UD
(United States)	Ian McCall	3

Finals; UFC 152
(United States)	Joseph Benavidez	5
(United States)	Demetrious Johnson	SD

^{1} The initial semifinal bout between Johnson and McCall at UFC on FX 2 ended in a draw. Johnson defeated McCall in a rematch at UFC on FX 3.

== Bonus awards ==
The following fighters received $65,000 bonuses.

- Fight of the Night: T. J. Grant vs. Evan Dunham
- Knockout of the Night: Cub Swanson
- Submission of the Night: Jon Jones

== See also ==
- List of UFC events
- 2012 in UFC
