= Donny Walker =

MMA Fighter

- Born: January 4, 1980 (age 46); Cleveland, Ohio, United States
- Other names: Eagle Eye
- Height: 5 ft 9 in (1.75 m)
- Weight: 145 lb (66 kg; 10.4 st)
- Division: Featherweight; Bantamweight
- Reach: 71.0 in (180 cm)
- Fighting out of: Mentor, Ohio, United States
- Team: GriffonRawl MMA Academy
- Years active: 2004-2013

Mixed martial arts record
- Total: 24
- Wins: 15
- By knockout: 4
- By submission: 8
- By decision: 3
- Losses: 9
- By knockout: 2
- By submission: 5
- By decision: 2

Other information
- Mixed martial arts record from Sherdog

Donald K. Walker (born January 4, 1980) is a former professional American mixed martial artist. A professional from 2004 until 2013, he competed for the UFC, Bellator, and King of the Cage.

== Mixed martial arts career ==
Walker began his MMA career competing mostly in regional promotions across the midwest with most of his bouts occurring in the featherweight division against notable opponents Jeff Curran and Cub Swanson. Walker was the reigning NAAFS Featherweight Champion before signing with the UFC.

=== Ultimate Fighting Championship ===
Walker tried out for the fourteenth season of The Ultimate Fighter, making it to the interview round, but was not selected.

Instead, Walker dropped to the bantamweight division and signed with the UFC. He made his promotional debut against fellow newcomer Jeff Hougland on July 2, 2011, at UFC 132. He lost the fight via unanimous decision.

Walker faced Ken Stone on September 17, 2011, at UFC Fight Night 25. He was submitted via rear naked choke at 2:40 seconds of the first round.

After going 0–2 in the UFC, he was subsequently released from the promotion.

== Championships and accomplishments ==
- North American Allied Fight Series
  - NAAFS Featherweight Championship (One time)

== Mixed martial arts record ==
Professional record breakdown
25 matches	15 wins	10 losses
By knockout	4	3
By submission	8	5
By decision	3	2

Res.	Record	Opponent	Method	Event	Date	Round	Time	Location	Notes
Loss	15–10	Mark Cherico	TKO (punches)	Pinnacle FC: Pittsburgh Challenge Series 3	June 29, 2013	2	1:04	Canonsburg, Pennsylvania, United States	
Loss	15–9	Frank Caraballo	KO (flying knee)	Bellator 66	April 20, 2012	4	2:25	Cleveland, Ohio, United States	Return to Featherweight; lost NAAFS Featherweight Championship.
Loss	15–8	Ken Stone	Technical Submission (rear-naked choke)	UFC Fight Night: Shields vs. Ellenberger	September 17, 2011	1	2:40	New Orleans, Louisiana, United States	
Loss	15–7	Jeff Hougland	Decision (unanimous)	UFC 132	July 2, 2011	3	5:00	Las Vegas, Nevada, United States	
Win	15–6	Billy Vaughan	Submission (rear-naked choke)	NAAFS: Night of Champions 2010	December 4, 2010	1	2:58	Cleveland, Ohio, United States	Defended NAAFS Featherweight Championship.
Win	14–6	Mike Nesto	Decision (unanimous)	NAAFS: Rock N Rumble 4	August 28, 2010	5	5:00	Cleveland, Ohio, United States	Won NAAFS Featherweight Championship.
Win	13–6	Kenny Foster	TKO (punches)	EFC: Downtown Beatdown 3	June 12, 2010	3	0:52	Erie, Pennsylvania, United States	
Win	12–6	Dustin Kempf	TKO (punches)	NAAFS: Caged Fury 9	February 20, 2010	2	4:55	Cleveland, Ohio, United States	
Win	11–6	Tony Jayme	Decision (split)	NAAFS: Caged Vengeance 6	September 19, 2009	3	5:00	Columbus, Ohio, United States	
Win	10–6	Bruce Ferguson	Submission (armbar)	UMMAXX 8: All Heart, No Fear	August 15, 2009	3	2:04	Akron, Ohio, United States	
Win	9–6	Brad Fonck	TKO (punches)	UMMAXX 7: Out of the Cage	May 2, 2009	1	0:32	Akron, Ohio, United States	
Loss	8–6	Cody Stevens	Submission (rear-naked choke)	NAAFS: Rock N Rumble 2	August 23, 2008	5	4:14	Cleveland, Ohio, United States	
Loss	8–5	Cub Swanson	Submission (rear-naked choke)	IFBL: Fight Night 11	February 23, 2008	3	1:24	Niles, Ohio, United States	
Win	8–4	Sonny Marchette	Submission (triangle choke)	NAAFS: Caged Fury 3	November 3, 2007	2	2:16	Cleveland, Ohio, United States	
Loss	7–4	Yaotzin Meza	TKO (punches)	EC: Fights	September 29, 2007	2	N/A	Monterrey, Mexico	
Win	7–3	Ryan McIntosh	Submission (guillotine choke)	Superior Fight Night 3	July 21, 2007	1	0:24	Cleveland, Ohio, United States	
Loss	6–3	Mike Bogner	Decision (unanimous)	NAAFS: Caged Fury 2	March 31, 2007	3	5:00	Cleveland, Ohio, United States	
Loss	6–2	Jeff Curran	Submission (rear-naked choke)	KOTC: Hard Knocks	January 19, 2007	3	3:23	Rockford, Illinois, United States	
Win	6–1	Dan Swift	Decision (split)	NAAFS: Caged Vengeance 2	October 7, 2006	3	5:00	Cleveland, Ohio, United States	
Win	5–1	Jason Taylor	Submission (triangle choke)	NAAFS: Fight Night in the Flats 2	October 1, 2005	2	2:33	Cleveland, Ohio, United States	
Win	4–1	Jesse Lessard	Submission (armbar)	KOTC: Shock and Awe	October 1, 2005	1	2:32	Edmonton, Alberta, Canada	
Win	3–1	Adam Bass	TKO (punches)	ECC: Ho Ho Ho KO	December 18, 2004	1	N/A	Dayton, Ohio, United States	
Loss	2–1	Josh Souder	Submission (heel hook)	KOTC 42: Buckeye Nuts	October 23, 2004	2	N/A	Dayton, Ohio, United States	
Win	2–0	Jim Calazante	Submission (rear-naked choke)	Xtreme Fighting Organization 3	October 2, 2004	2	1:20	Lakemoor, Illinois, United States	
Win	1–0	Jason Cable	Submission (armbar)	Extreme Fighting Challenge 9	September 10, 2004	1	2:55	Cleveland, Ohio, United States	
