= Kyle Noke =

Australian mixed martial arts fighter

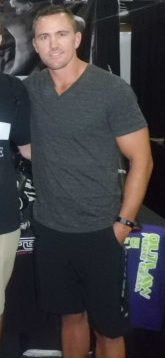
- Born: 18 March 1980 (age 46); Dubbo, New South Wales, Australia
- Other names: KO
- Nationality: Australian
- Height: 6 ft 2 in (1.88 m)
- Weight: 170 lb (77 kg; 12 st)
- Division: Middleweight (2006–2012); Welterweight (2002–2006), (2012–present)
- Reach: 75 in (190 cm)
- Style: Boxing, Brazilian jiu-jitsu, wrestling
- Stance: Orthodox
- Fighting out of: Albuquerque, New Mexico, United States
- Team: Jackson's Submission Fighting; Integrated Martial Arts
- Years active: 2002–2016

Mixed martial arts record
- Total: 33
- Wins: 22
- By knockout: 9
- By submission: 7
- By decision: 6
- Losses: 10
- By knockout: 1
- By submission: 3
- By decision: 6
- Draws: 1

Other information
- Mixed martial arts record from Sherdog

Kyle Noke (born 18 March 1980) is an Australian retired mixed martial artist who competed as a Welterweight in the Ultimate Fighting Championship. A professional competitor since 2002, Noke has also fought for EliteXC.

== Background ==
Noke, originally from Dubbo, in New South Wales, competed in various sports growing up including rugby, and began training in mixed martial arts in 2002. Noke also worked in security; guarding "Crocodile Hunter" Steve Irwin, Noke serving as Irwin's bodyguard for three years during Irwin's heyday as host of the Australian-based nature show. Noke's job was eventually changed to train "The Crocodile Hunter" between filming sessions. Noke and another bodyguard worked with Irwin on boxing, Brazilian jiu-jitsu and wrestling. During his time with Irwin, Noke bounced between the U.S. and Australia as he continued to rack up professional victories; he found the tutelage of renowned trainer Greg Jackson. In September 2006 Noke got word that Irwin had died. He went back to security at the zoo where Irwin worked but soon afterward decided that he needed to go after his dream of being a mixed martial artist.

== Mixed martial arts career ==
=== Early career ===
Noke made his professional MMA debut in November 2002. Over the next five years, Noke fought in his native Australia and amassed a record of 13–3–1. During this time, he split a pair of matches with fellow future UFC fighter George Sotiropoulos.

=== EliteXC ===
Noke made his United States MMA debut in November 2007 as he defeated Seth Kleinbeck via TKO due to cuts at EliteXC: Renegade. Noke returned to the promotion in February 2008, losing via KO to Scott Smith at EliteXC: Street Certified.

=== The Ultimate Fighter ===
Noke was a participant on the UFC reality show The Ultimate Fighter: Team Liddell vs. Team Ortiz in 2010. After winning his preliminary fight to enter the house, Kyle was chosen for the first fight against Team Ortiz member Clayton McKinney and won via triangle choke in the first round.

In the quarter-finals, Noke was selected to face rival team member and good friend Kris McCray. Although Noke was highly touted and favored to win, he eventually began to succumb to the multiple takedowns by McCray, which Noke had little answer to gaining position or escaping and lost the fight via unanimous decision after three rounds.

=== Ultimate Fighting Championship ===
Noke made his UFC debut against TUF teammate Josh Bryant at The Ultimate Fighter 11 Finale. After putting in a dominant first round, Noke won via second-round TKO.

Noke defeated Rob Kimmons on 13 November 2010 at UFC 122 at 1:33 in the second round via rear naked choke.

Noke faced Chris Camozzi on 27 February 2011 at UFC 127. Noke defeated Camozzi in the first round with a rear-naked choke. Noke was also awarded Submission of the Night bonus.

Noke was expected to face Tom Lawlor on 14 August 2011 at UFC on Versus 5. Lawlor, however, pulled out of the bout due to an injury in early July 2011. Ed Herman replaced Lawlor on the card. After defending multiple submission attempts from Herman, Noke finally tapped to an inverted heelhook 4:15 in the first round. Noke was clearly in pain from the submission, and he needed help to walk out of the octagon.

Noke was expected to face Jared Hamman on 3 March 2012 at UFC on FX 2, but Hamman was forced to withdraw with an injury and replaced by Andrew Craig. After a dominant first round by Noke, Craig took control in the next two rounds and Noke lost the fight via unanimous decision.

Noke made his welterweight debut against Charlie Brenneman on 22 September at UFC 152. Noke defeated Brenneman via TKO only 45 seconds into the first round.

Noke was expected to face Seth Baczynski on 15 December 2012 at UFC on FX 6. However, Noke pulled out of the bout citing a shoulder injury and was replaced by Mike Pierce.

In June 2013, it was announced that Noke would be coaching The Ultimate Fighter Nations: Canada vs. Australia, opposite Patrick Côté. The reality show features welterweights and Middleweights. The coaches faced each other on 16 April 2014 at The Ultimate Fighter Nations Finale. Noke lost the fight via unanimous decision.

Noke was expected to face Yoshihiro Akiyama on 20 September 2014 at UFC Fight Night 52. However, Noke was forced out of the bout with a knee injury.

Noke was expected to face Andreas Ståhl on 10 May 2015 at UFC Fight Night 65. However, on 2 April, it was announced that Ståhl pulled out of the fight due to undisclosed reasons and was replaced by promotional newcomer Jonavin Webb. Noke won the fight via split decision.

Noke faced Peter Sobotta on 15 November 2015 at UFC 193. He won the fight via TKO in the first round after dropping Sobotta with a body kick and following up with punches on the ground. The victory also produced a Performance of the Night award for Noke.

Noke was expected to face Kelvin Gastelum on 2 January 2016 at UFC 195. However 22 December, Gastelum was forced to pull out due to a wrist injury and was replaced by promotional newcomer Alex Morono. Noke lost the bout via split decision.

Noke next faced Keita Nakamura on 13 July 2016 at UFC Fight Night 91. He lost the fight via submission (rear-naked choke) in the final seconds of the second round.

Noke was expected to face Dominique Steele on 27 November 2016 at UFC Fight Night 101. However, Steele pulled out of the fight on 21 October and was replaced by Omari Akhmedov. Noke lost the fight via unanimous decision and subsequently announced his retirement shortly after.

=== Retirement and comeback ===
In October 2017, 10 months after his retirement announcement, Noke announced plans for an attempted comeback and step into the cage again. As of March 2019, Noke does not have timetable on a possible return.

== Championships and achievements ==
- Ultimate Fighting Championship
  - Submission of the Night (One time) vs. Chris Camozzi
  - Performance of the Night (One time)
  - UFC.com Awards
    - 2010: Ranked #4 Newcomer of the Year
- Xtreme Fighting Championships (Australia)
  - XFC Middleweight Championship (One time)

== Mixed martial arts record ==
Professional record breakdown
33 matches	22 wins	10 losses
By knockout	9	1
By submission	7	3
By decision	6	6
Draws	1	

Res.	Record	Opponent	Method	Event	Date	Round	Time	Location	Notes
Loss	22–10–1	Omari Akhmedov	Decision (unanimous)	UFC Fight Night: Whittaker vs. Brunson	27 November 2016	3	5:00	Melbourne, Australia	
Loss	22–9–1	Keita Nakamura	Submission (rear-naked choke)	UFC Fight Night: McDonald vs. Lineker	13 July 2016	2	4:59	Sioux Falls, South Dakota, United States	
Loss	22–8–1	Alex Morono	Decision (split)	UFC 195	2 January 2016	3	5:00	Las Vegas, Nevada, United States	
Win	22–7–1	Peter Sobotta	TKO (body kick and punches)	UFC 193	15 November 2015	1	2:01	Melbourne, Australia	Performance of the Night.
Win	21–7–1	Jonavin Webb	Decision (split)	UFC Fight Night: Miocic vs. Hunt	10 May 2015	3	5:00	Adelaide, Australia	
Loss	20–7–1	Patrick Côté	Decision (unanimous)	The Ultimate Fighter Nations Finale: Bisping vs. Kennedy	16 April 2014	3	5:00	Quebec City, Quebec, Canada	
Win	20–6–1	Charlie Brenneman	TKO (punches)	UFC 152	22 September 2012	1	0:45	Toronto, Ontario, Canada	Welterweight debut.
Loss	19–6–1	Andrew Craig	Decision (unanimous)	UFC on FX: Alves vs. Kampmann	3 March 2012	3	5:00	Sydney, Australia	
Loss	19–5–1	Ed Herman	Submission (inverted heel hook)	UFC Live: Hardy vs. Lytle	14 August 2011	1	4:15	Milwaukee, Wisconsin, United States	
Win	19–4–1	Chris Camozzi	Submission (rear-naked choke)	UFC 127	27 February 2011	1	1:35	Sydney, Australia	Submission of the Night.
Win	18–4–1	Rob Kimmons	Submission (rear-naked choke)	UFC 122	13 November 2010	2	1:33	Oberhausen, Germany	
Win	17–4–1	Josh Bryant	TKO (punches)	The Ultimate Fighter: Team Liddell vs. Team Ortiz Finale	19 June 2010	2	3:12	Las Vegas, Nevada, United States	
Win	16–4–1	Kyacey Uscola	Decision (unanimous)	Top Combat Championship	26 September 2009	3	5:00	Hato Rey, Puerto Rico	
Win	15–4–1	Yoann Gouaida	Submission (rear-naked choke)	Cage Fighting Championships 4	23 May 2008	1	1:43	Sydney, Australia	
Loss	14–4–1	Scott Smith	KO (punch)	EliteXC: Street Certified	16 February 2008	2	0:07	Miami, Florida, United States	
Win	14–3–1	Seth Kleinbeck	TKO (doctor stoppage)	EliteXC: Renegade	10 November 2007	2	4:22	Corpus Christi, Texas, United States	
Draw	13–3–1	Hector Lombard	Draw	Cage Fighting Championship 1	28 July 2007	3	5:00	Gold Coast, Australia	
Win	13–3	Brian Ebersole	Decision (majority)	XFC 12: Oktoberfist	13 October 2006	5	5:00	Sydney, Australia	Won the XFC Middleweight Championship.
Win	12–3	Yusaku Tsukumo	Submission (triangle choke)	Warriors Realm 6	24 June 2006	1	1:14	Brisbane, Australia	
Loss	11–3	George Sotiropoulos	Decision (unanimous)	Warriors Realm 5	25 February 2006	5	5:00	Geelong Australia	
Win	11–2	Byron Donnelly	Decision (unanimous)	Warriors Realm 4	2 July 2005	2	5:00	Geelong, Australia	
Win	10–2	George Sotiropoulos	Decision (split)	Warriors Realm 4	2 July 2005	2	5:00	Geelong, Australia	
Win	9–2	Luke Pezutti	TKO (punches)	Warriors Realm 3	12 March 2005	1	5:00	Brisbane, Australia	
Loss	8–2	Katsuya Inoue	Decision (split)	Warriors Realm 2	10 December 2004	3	5:00	Sunshine Coast, Australia	
Win	8–1	Rhys Whitmore	Submission (triangle choke)	Warriors Realm 1	3 September 2004	1	0:38	Sunshine Coast, Australia	
Win	7–1	Matt Te-Paa	Decision (split)	XFC 5: When Worlds Collide	13 August 2004	3	5:00	Southport, Australia	
Win	6–1	Mike Sethna	Submission (kneebar)	Xtreme Fight Club 2	5 June 2004	3	1:58	Richlands, Australia	
Win	5–1	Jimmy Raborn	Submission (rear-naked choke)	XFC 4: Australia vs. The World	19 March 2004	2	1:30	Southport, Australia	
Loss	4–1	Noriyuki Hayakawa	Submission (armbar)	Xtreme Fighting Championships 3	14 November 2003	3	1:33	Southport, Australia	
Win	4–0	Neil Swailes	TKO (punches)	Xtreme Fighting Championships 2	30 August 2003	2	2:24	Southport, Australia	
Win	3–0	Adrian Bolton	TKO (punches)	Xtreme Fighting Championships 1	4 May 2003	1	2:34	Southport, Australia	
Win	2–0	Ulf Strand	TKO (punches)	Spartan Reality Fight 6	5 April 2003	2	1:21	New South Wales, Australia	
Win	1–0	Peter Robbie	TKO (submission to punches)	Spartan Reality Fight 5	30 November 2002	1	2:25	New South Wales, Australia	

=== Mixed martial arts exhibition record ===
Exhibition record breakdown		
3 matches	2 wins	1 loss
By knockout	0	0
By submission	1	0
By decision	1	1

Result	Record	Opponent	Method	Event	Date	Round	Time	Location	Notes
Loss	2–1	Kris McCray	Decision (unanimous)	The Ultimate Fighter: Team Liddell vs. Team Ortiz		3	5:00	Las Vegas, Nevada	Quarter-finals
Win	2–0	Clayton McKinney	Submission (triangle choke)	The Ultimate Fighter: Team Liddell vs. Team Ortiz		1	2:44	Las Vegas, Nevada	Preliminary bout
Win	1–0	Warren Thompson	Decision (unanimous)	The Ultimate Fighter: Team Liddell vs. Team Ortiz		2	5:00	Las Vegas, Nevada	Elimination bout

== See also ==
- List of current UFC fighters
- List of male mixed martial artists
