= Andre Winner =

British mixed martial arts fighter

- Born: 9 November 1981 (age 44); St. George's, Grenada
- Nationality: British
- Height: 5 ft 11 in (1.80 m)
- Weight: 155 lb (70 kg; 11.1 st)
- Division: Lightweight
- Reach: 73.0 in (185 cm)
- Style: Boxing, Kyokushin Karate
- Fighting out of: Leicester, England
- Team: Team Rough House
- Rank: Blue belt in Brazilian Jiu-Jitsu
- Years active: 2006–present

Mixed martial arts record
- Total: 37
- Wins: 22
- By knockout: 4
- By submission: 4
- By decision: 14
- Losses: 13
- By submission: 3
- By decision: 10
- Draws: 2

Other information
- Mixed martial arts record from Sherdog

Andre Badi Winner (born 9 November 1981) is a Grenadian-born British mixed martial artist. He was a cast member of Spike TV's The Ultimate Fighter: United States vs. United Kingdom, reaching the final. Winner is also a member of Team Rough House.

== Mixed martial arts career ==
=== Early career ===
Winner was born in St. George's, Grenada to a white British father and an Afro-Caribbean mother, and moved to Leicester, United Kingdom at seven years old. Winner is one of three brothers and is the middle child. His older brother is William and his younger brother is named Michael. Michael is often in his corner during his fights and often assists in training. He started in sports during his high school years, competing in football and other athletics. Winner never thought of being a mixed martial artist but loved sports. He went to self-defense classes at Leicester Shootfighters and met Dan Hardy and Paul Daley. Hardy inspired Winner to give the sport a real try.

Winner tried out for the eighth season of the Ultimate Fighter. He did not make the cut but tried out for the ninth season and made the show.

=== The Ultimate Fighter ===
To get into The Ultimate Fighter house, Winner fought Gary Kelly. Winner won by knockout while working Kelly in the clinch. Winner then flew to Las Vegas to compete under coach Michael Bisping against the US team. He advanced to the semifinals of the lightweight tournament after defeating Santino Defranco by TKO in the first round. Winner then had his last fight on the show defeating Cameron Dollar by submission in round one. The win over Dollar put Winner in the finals to fight teammate, Ross Pearson.

=== Ultimate Fighting Championship ===
Winner fought Ross Pearson at The Ultimate Finale 9 in Las Vegas, Nevada. Winner lost by unanimous decision, along with losing the six-figure contract.

He defeated Rolando Delgado via first-round KO on 14 November 2009, at UFC 105.

Winner was scheduled to face Cole Miller on 31 March 2010 at UFC Fight Night 21. However, Miller was forced off the card after suffering an injury. Rafaello Oliveira was later confirmed as his replacement. Winner won via unanimous decision.

At UFC 118, Winner's fight was selected to be a part of the SpikeTV broadcast. He fought Nik Lentz, losing via unanimous decision after being out wrestled for all three rounds.

Winner then faced Dennis Siver on 13 November 2010 at UFC 122. He lost the fight via submission in the first round.

Winner lost to Anthony Njokuani on 2 July 2011 at UFC 132 via unanimous decision. Following the loss, Winner was released from the promotion.

=== BAMMA ===
Winner recently signed a contract with British promotion BAMMA. His first fight on was at BAMMA 7 against BAMMA veteran Jason Ball. Winner won the fight via unanimous decision.

Winner next competed in a Lightweight Title Eliminator bout against Diego Gonzalez at BAMMA 8. He again won via unanimous decision.

Winner next faced Rob Sinclair for the BAMMA Lightweight title at BAMMA 10, the first MMA event to be shown on Channel 5. Winner lost the fight via split decision.

=== All or Nothing ===
On 3 May 2014 Winner fought in a 7-man tournament at All or Nothing 6. Winner won his quarter final fight via TKO against Jordan Miller before winning a decision victory against Stephen Martin. In the final, Winner defeated Artem Lobov via unanimous decision and therefore won the overall tournament.

=== KSW ===
At KSW 24, Winner challenged Mateusz Gamrot in a lightweight bout. He lost the fight via unanimous decision.

=== League S-70 ===
Winner faced to Akop Stepanyan on 29 August 2015 at League S-70: Russia vs. World. He lost via unanimous decision.

== Mixed martial arts record ==
Professional record breakdown
37 matches	22 wins	13 losses
By knockout	4	0
By submission	4	3
By decision	14	10
Draws	2	

Res.	Record	Opponent	Method	Event	Date	Round	Time	Location	Notes
Loss	22–13–2	Denis Kanakov	Decision (unanimous)	ACA 96: Goncharov vs. Johnson	8 June 2019	3	5:00	Łódź, Poland	
Loss	22–12–2	Yusup Raisov	Decision (unanimous)	ACB 90 Moscow	10 November 2018	3	5:00	Moscow, Russia	
Win	22–11–2	Adam Aliev	Submission (rear naked choke)	ACB 87: Whiteford vs Mousah	19 May 2018	2	1:53	Nottingham, England	
Loss	21–11–2	Saul Rogers	Submission (D'arce choke)	Tanko	13 August 2016	1	0:54	Manchester, England	
Win	21–10–2	Abner Lloveras	Decision (split)	SHC 11	25 June 2016	3	5:00	Geneva, Switzerland	
Loss	20–10–2	Leszek Krakowski	Decision (unanimous)	KSW 32: Road to Wembley	31 October 2015	3	5:00	London, England	
Loss	20–9–2	Akop Stepanyan	Decision (unanimous)	League S-70: Russia vs. World	29 August 2015	3	5:00	Sochi, Russia	
Win	20–8–2	Colin Fletcher	Decision (unanimous)	BAMMA 20	25 April 2015	3	5:00	Birmingham, England	
Draw	19–8–2	Xavier Sedras	Draw (unanimous)	Phoenix Fight Night 25	28 March 2015	3	5:00	Bournemouth, Dorset, England	
Win	19–8–1	Artem Lobov	Decision (unanimous)	All or Nothing 6	3 May 2014	3	5:00	Leeds, West Yorkshire, England	Tournament Final.
Win	18–8–1	Stephen Martin	Decision (unanimous)	All or Nothing 6	3 May 2014	3	5:00	Leeds, West Yorkshire, England	Tournament Semifinal.
Win	17–8–1	Jordan Miller	TKO (punches)	All or Nothing 6	3 May 2014	3	2:07	Leeds, West Yorkshire, England	Tournament Quarterfinal.
Win	16–8–1	Jeremy Petley	Decision (unanimous)	Europa MMA - Coga vs. Backstrom	22 March 2014	3	5:00	Brentwood, Essex, England	
Loss	15–8–1	Mateusz Gamrot	Decision (unanimous)	KSW 24	28 September 2013	3	5:00	Łódź, Poland	
Win	15–7–1	Drew Fickett	Decision (unanimous)	GWC – The British Invasion: US vs. UK	29 June 2013	3	5:00	Kansas City, Missouri, United States	
Loss	14–7–1	Rob Sinclair	Decision (split)	BAMMA 10	15 September 2012	5	5:00	London, England	For the BAMMA World Lightweight Championship.
Win	14–6–1	Diego Gonzalez	Decision (unanimous)	BAMMA 8: Manuwa vs. Rea	10 December 2011	3	5:00	Nottingham, England	Lightweight Title Eliminator.
Win	13–6–1	Jason Ball	Decision (unanimous)	BAMMA 7: Trigg vs. Wallhead	10 September 2011	3	5:00	Birmingham, England	
Loss	12–6–1	Anthony Njokuani	Decision (unanimous)	UFC 132	2 July 2011	3	5:00	Las Vegas, Nevada, United States	
Loss	12–5–1	Dennis Siver	Submission (rear-naked choke)	UFC 122	13 November 2010	1	3:37	Oberhausen, Germany	
Loss	12–4–1	Nik Lentz	Decision (unanimous)	UFC 118	28 August 2010	3	5:00	Boston, Massachusetts, United States	
Win	12–3–1	Rafaello Oliveira	Decision (unanimous)	UFC Fight Night: Florian vs. Gomi	31 March 2010	3	5:00	Charlotte, North Carolina, United States	
Win	11–3–1	Rolando Delgado	KO (punch)	UFC 105	14 November 2009	1	3:22	Manchester, England	
Loss	10–3–1	Ross Pearson	Decision (unanimous)	TUF 9 Finale	20 June 2009	3	5:00	Las Vegas, Nevada, United States	The Ultimate Fighter: United States vs. United Kingdom Lightweight Tournament Final.
Draw	10–2–1	Abdul Mohamed	Draw	Cage Warriors: Enter the Rough House 7	12 July 2008	3	5:00	Nottingham, England	
Loss	10–2	Bendy Casimir	Decision (majority)	Cage Warriors: Enter the Rough House 6	19 April 2008	3	5:00	Nottingham, England	
Win	10–1	Mario Stapel	Decision (unanimous)	FX3: England vs. Germany	24 November 2007	3	5:00	Reading, England	
Win	9–1	A.J. Wenn	Decision (unanimous)	CWFC: Enter The Rough House 4	14 October 2007	3	5:00	Nottingham, England	
Win	8–1	Daniel Thomas	Decision (unanimous)	CWFC: Enter The Rough House 3	21 July 2007	3	5:00	Nottingham, England	
Win	7–1	Aidan Marron	Decision (unanimous)	FX3: Fight Night 5	7 July 2007	3	5:00	Reading, England	
Loss	6–1	Greg Loughran	Technical Submission (guillotine choke)	CWFC: Enter The Rough House 2	28 April 2007	2	3:52	Nottingham, England	
Win	6–0	Wesley Felix	Decision (split)	FX3: Fight Night 4	10 March 2007	3	5:00	Reading, England	
Win	5–0	Sami Berik	TKO (punches)	Cage Rage Contenders 3	12 November 2006	3	1:50	London, England	
Win	4–0	Paul Cooper	Submission (triangle choke)	CWFC: Showdown	16 September 2006	2	1:50	Sheffield, England	
Win	3–0	Jeff Lawson	Submission (eye injury)	Cage Rage Contenders 2	20 August 2006	2	1:26	Streatham, England	
Win	2–0	Denas Banevicius	TKO (submission to punches)	FX3: Full Contact Fight Night 3	15 July 2006	1	2:21	Bracknell, England	
Win	1–0	Gareth Dummer	KO (knees)	HOP 1: Fight Night 1	12 December 2004	1	N/A	Swansea, England	
