= Yves Jabouin =

Haitian martial artist

- Born: Fernand Yves Jabouin; May 30, 1979 (age 47); Port-au-Prince, Haiti
- Other names: Tiger
- Nationality: Canadian; Haitian
- Height: 5 ft 8 in (1.73 m)
- Weight: 135 lb (61 kg; 9.6 st)
- Division: Featherweight; Bantamweight
- Reach: 68 in (170 cm)
- Fighting out of: Montreal, Quebec, Canada
- Team: tristar Gym
- Years active: 2001-2015

Mixed martial arts record
- Total: 31
- Wins: 20
- By knockout: 11
- By submission: 1
- By decision: 8
- Losses: 11
- By knockout: 5
- By submission: 4
- By decision: 2

Other information
- Mixed martial arts record from Sherdog

Fernand Yves Jabouin (born May 30, 1979) is a retired Haitian-Canadian mixed martial artist who formerly competed in the Bantamweight division of the Ultimate Fighting Championship. A professional competitor since 2001, Jabouin also formerly competed for the WEC.

== Background ==
Jabouin was born in Haiti, where he lived until he fled the war-torn country with his mother and two siblings, relocating in Canada. Jabouin began practicing the martial arts from a young age, as his father was a fan of Chuck Norris and the young Jabouin would often go to his local movie theatre to watch Kung Fu films. Jabouin attended college and graduated with a degree in Graphic Design, and used to work as an animator for television commercials.

== Mixed martial arts career ==
=== Early career ===
Jabouin made his professional debut in 2001 on the regional circuit, fighting mostly in his native Canada and holding a professional record of 14–4 with 11 wins via knockout before being signed by the WEC.

=== World Extreme Cagefighting ===
Jabouin made his WEC debut against Raphael Assunção on October 10, 2009, at WEC 43, losing via split decision.

Jabouin was scheduled to face fellow Canadian Mark Hominick on January 10, 2010, at WEC 46, but was forced off the card with an injury. Jabouin was replaced by Bryan Caraway.

The fight eventually took place on June 20, 2010, at WEC 49. Jabouin was defeated by Hominick via second-round TKO, in a bout that earned Fight of the Night honors.

Jabouin defeated Brandon Visher via unanimous decision on November 11, 2010, at WEC 52.

=== Ultimate Fighting Championship ===
On October 28, 2010, World Extreme Cagefighting merged with the Ultimate Fighting Championship. As part of the merger, all WEC fighters were transferred to the UFC.

Jabouin lost to Pablo Garza on April 30, 2011, at UFC 129, via submission (flying triangle choke) in the first round.

Jabouin won against Ian Loveland by split decision on August 27, 2011, at UFC 134.

Jabouin defeated Walel Watson via split decision December 10, 2011, at UFC 140 in a close back-and-forth fight.

Jabouin was expected to face Mike Easton on May 15, 2012, at UFC on Fuel TV: Korean Zombie vs. Poirier. However, Easton was forced out of the bout with an injury and replaced by Jeff Hougland. Jabouin showed superior striking and was able to drop Hougland multiple times with a variety of strikes en route to a unanimous decision victory.

Jabouin was knocked out by Brad Pickett in the first round on September 29, 2012, at UFC on Fuel TV 5.

Jabouin was expected to face Johnny Eduardo on March 16, 2013, at UFC 158. However, on March 6, Eduardo was forced to pull out of the bout citing a shoulder injury. Jabouin was then pulled from the card as a suitable replacement could not be found on short notice.

Jabouin faced Dustin Pague on June 15, 2013, at UFC 161. He won the back-and-forth fight via split decision.

Jabouin faced Eddie Wineland at UFC on Fox 10. Jabouin lost the fight via TKO in the second round.

Jabouin faced Mike Easton on June 14, 2014, at UFC 174. He won the fight via unanimous decision.

Jabouin faced Thomas Almeida on April 25, 2015, at UFC 186. Jabouin lost the fight via TKO in the first round.

Jabouin faced Felipe Arantes on August 23, 2015, at UFC Fight Night 74. He lost the fight via submission in the first round, and was subsequently released from the promotion.

== Mixed martial arts record ==
Professional record breakdown
31 matches	20 wins	11 losses
By knockout	11	5
By submission	1	4
By decision	8	2

Res.	Record	Opponent	Method	Event	Date	Round	Time	Location	Notes
Loss	20–11	Felipe Arantes	Submission (armbar)	UFC Fight Night: Holloway vs. Oliveira	August 23, 2015	1	4:21	Saskatoon, Saskatchewan, Canada	
Loss	20–10	Thomas Almeida	TKO (punches)	UFC 186	April 25, 2015	1	4:18	Montreal, Quebec, Canada	
Win	20–9	Mike Easton	Decision (unanimous)	UFC 174	June 14, 2014	3	5:00	Vancouver, British Columbia, Canada	
Loss	19–9	Eddie Wineland	TKO (punches)	UFC on Fox: Henderson vs. Thomson	January 25, 2014	2	4:16	Chicago, Illinois, United States	
Win	19–8	Dustin Pague	Decision (split)	UFC 161	June 15, 2013	3	5:00	Winnipeg, Manitoba, Canada	
Loss	18–8	Brad Pickett	KO (punch)	UFC on Fuel TV: Struve vs. Miocic	September 29, 2012	1	3:40	Nottingham, England	
Win	18–7	Jeff Hougland	Decision (unanimous)	UFC on Fuel TV: Korean Zombie vs. Poirier	May 15, 2012	3	5:00	Fairfax, Virginia, United States	
Win	17–7	Walel Watson	Decision (split)	UFC 140	December 10, 2011	3	5:00	Toronto, Ontario, Canada	
Win	16–7	Ian Loveland	Decision (split)	UFC 134	August 27, 2011	3	5:00	Rio de Janeiro, Brazil	Bantamweight debut.
Loss	15–7	Pablo Garza	Submission (flying triangle choke)	UFC 129	April 30, 2011	1	4:31	Toronto, Ontario, Canada	
Win	15–6	Brandon Visher	Decision (unanimous)	WEC 52	November 11, 2010	3	5:00	Las Vegas, Nevada, United States	
Loss	14–6	Mark Hominick	TKO (punches)	WEC 49	June 20, 2010	2	3:21	Edmonton, Alberta, Canada	Fight of the Night
Loss	14–5	Raphael Assunção	Decision (split)	WEC 43	October 10, 2009	3	5:00	San Antonio, Texas, United States	
Win	14–4	J.T. Wells	KO (spinning back kick)	XMMA 6: House of Pain	November 8, 2008	3	4:56	Montreal, Quebec, Canada	
Win	13–4	Nayeb Hezam	TKO (punches)	UGC 20: Fight to Survive	June 14, 2008	2	N/A	Montreal, Quebec, Canada	
Win	12–4	Brad Cardinal	Decision (unanimous)	PFP: New Year's Restitution	January 13, 2008	3	5:00	Halifax, Nova Scotia, Canada	
Win	11–4	Daniel Boissonneault	KO (punches)	UGC 19: TKO Night	November 10, 2007	1	2:27	Montreal, Quebec, Canada	
Loss	10–4	Jonathan Brookins	Submission (elbows)	Ultimate Warrior Challenge 2	June 30, 2007	2	3:35	Jacksonville, Florida, United States	
Win	10–3	Antoine Coutu	KO (punches)	UGC 18: Xtreme Victory	May 18, 2007	1	2:02	Montreal, Quebec, Canada	
Win	9–3	Eric Lacelle	TKO (punches)	Ultimate Generation Combat 15	October 20, 2006	1	4:27	Montreal, Quebec, Canada	
Win	8–3	Dustin Severs	Decision	Ultimate Generation Combat 9	October 30, 2004	N/A	N/A	Montreal, Quebec, Canada	
Loss	7–3	Sam Stout	TKO (punch)	TKO 16: Infernal	May 22, 2004	1	4:15	Quebec City, Quebec, Canada	
Win	7–2	Chad Hamzeh	TKO (punches)	Ultimate Generation Combat 7	March 6, 2004	3	N/A	Montreal, Quebec, Canada	
Win	6–2	Eric Davidson	Submission (choke)	Ultimate Generation Combat 6	December 20, 2003	1	1:22	Montreal, Quebec, Canada	
Win	5–2	Frederic Poirier	KO (punches)	Ultimate Generation Combat 4	June 13, 2003	2	1:25	Montreal, Quebec, Canada	
Win	4–2	Rachid Aoudj	KO (punches)	Ultimate Generation Combat 3	March 8, 2003	N/A	N/A	Victoriaville, Quebec, Canada	
Win	3–2	Andy Lalonde	TKO (punches)	UCC Proving Ground 8	November 3, 2002	1	3:12	Victoriaville, Quebec, Canada	
Win	2–2	Thierry Quenneville	KO (punches)	Ultimate Generation Combat 1	June 14, 2002	1	N/A	Victoriaville, Quebec, Canada	
Loss	1–2	Steve Claveau	Decision (split)	UCC 7: Bad Boyz	January 25, 2002	2	5:00	Montreal, Quebec, Canada	
Loss	1–1	Richard Nancoo	Submission (armbar)	UCC 6: Redemption	October 19, 2001	1	4:50	Montreal, Quebec, Canada	
Win	1–0	Dave Nicholls	TKO (corner stoppage)	UCC 4: Return Of The Super Strikers	May 12, 2001	1	5:18	Sherbrooke, Quebec, Canada	

== See also ==
- List of current UFC fighters
- List of male mixed martial artists
- List of Canadian UFC fighters
