= Mike Easton =

American mixed-martial artist

- Born: Michael Raymond Easton; January 25, 1984 (age 42); Washington, D.C.
- Other names: The Hulk
- Nationality: American
- Height: 5 ft 6 in (1.68 m)
- Weight: 135 lb (61 kg; 9.6 st)
- Division: Bantamweight
- Reach: 70 in (180 cm)
- Stance: Southpaw
- Fighting out of: Camp Springs, Maryland, U.S.
- Team: Alliance MMA; Team Lloyd Irvin
- Rank: Black belt in Taekwondo; Black belt in Brazilian jiu-jitsu under Lloyd Irvin
- Years active: 2003–present

Mixed martial arts record
- Total: 19
- Wins: 13
- By knockout: 4
- By submission: 2
- By decision: 7
- Losses: 6
- By knockout: 1
- By decision: 5

Other information
- Mixed martial arts record from Sherdog

Michael Raymond Easton (born January 25, 1984) is an American mixed martial artist, who is perhaps best known for his stint in the Bantamweight division of the Ultimate Fighting Championship. A professional competitor since 2003, he was the reigning Ultimate Warrior Challenge Bantamweight Champion when he joined the UFC.

== Background ==
Easton was born and raised in Washington D.C. Growing up dyslexic in a rough area of the city, Easton sought an outlet through martial arts, beginning with Taekwondo from a young age and going on to earn a black belt. At the age of 17, Easton began training in Brazilian jiu-jitsu under the tutelage of Lloyd Irvin. Easton was also a World Kickboxing Association World Champion and WKA U.S. National Champion, and won a bronze medal at the 2008 Brown Belt Brazilian Jiu-Jitsu Mundials.

== Mixed martial arts career ==
=== Early career ===
Easton made his professional debut in 2003 for Reality Fighting at the age of 20. He fought and defeated Anibal Torres via unanimous decision. Almost a year after his debut, Easton returned to defeat Jason Taylor, again winning the fight via unanimous decision.

In 2007, Easton was awarded his black belt in Brazilian jiu-jitsu under Lloyd Irvin. That year Easton also lost for the first time. During a bout against Reynaldo Duarte, Easton misjudged a kick taking the full force of the blow on his elbow. He recalled the injury in an interview with The Washington Post. "My arm just flopped backward, I'm having a full-blown conversation with my coach while this guy's trying to punch me in the face. I'm like, 'Man, my arm's not working. What's going on with my arm?' This guy's just hitting me in the face....I wasn't worried about him. I don't fear no man." Because of the severity of the injury his corner was forced to throw in the towel and Easton was immediately rushed to the hospital. After claiming a 5–1 record, Easton signed with Virginia-based promotion, Ultimate Warrior Challenge. He fought twice for the promotion before earning himself a title shot against Justin Robbins. Easton submitted Robbins in the third round of their five-round fight, winning him the bantamweight championship.

His first defense of the title was against Josh Ferguson at UWC 6: Capital Punishment in April 2009. Easton won the fight in the first round via submission due to a guillotine choke.

Easton then fought former WEC title holder, Chase Beebe. The fight went all five rounds. However, Easton won the fight via split decision, and retained his title. The crowd heavily booed the results, and the fight went on to be named Sherdog's Robbery of the Year.

=== Ultimate Fighting Championship ===
After nearly a two-year hiatus from competing, Easton signed with the UFC on July 26, 2011. His promotional debut was expected to take place against Jeff Hougland on October 1, 2011, at UFC on Versus 6. However, Hougland was forced out of the bout with an injury and replaced by fellow UFC newcomer Byron Bloodworth. Bloodworth failed to make the 135 pound weight limit, thus the match was changed to a 138-pound catchweight bout, with Bloodworth being fined for the infraction. Easton won by TKO in the second round.

Easton was expected to face Ken Stone on January 20, 2012, at UFC on FX 1. However, Stone was forced out of the bout with an injury and replaced by promotional newcomer Jared Papazian. Easton won the bout via majority decision.

Easton was expected to face Yves Jabouin on May 15, 2012, at UFC on Fuel TV: Korean Zombie vs. Poirier. However, Easton was forced out of the bout with an injury and replaced by Jeff Hougland.

Easton fought Ivan Menjivar on July 7, 2012, at UFC 148 and won the fight via unanimous decision.

Easton was expected to face T.J. Dillashaw on December 8, 2012, at UFC on Fox 5. However, Dillashaw was forced out of the bout with an injury and Bryan Caraway was briefly linked as a replacement. Caraway himself was injured and was replaced by Raphael Assunção. He lost the fight via unanimous decision.

Easton next faced Brad Pickett on April 6, 2013, at UFC on Fuel TV 9. He lost the back-and-forth fight via split decision. Despite the loss on the scorecards, Easton earned his first Fight of the Night bonus with this bout.

Easton faced T.J. Dillashaw on January 15, 2014, at UFC Fight Night 35. He lost the fight via unanimous decision.

Easton faced Yves Jabouin on June 14, 2014, at UFC 174. He lost the fight via unanimous decision, and was subsequently released from the promotion shortly after.

== Championships and accomplishments ==
- Ultimate Fighting Championship
  - Fight of the Night (One time) vs. Brad Pickett
  - UFC.com Awards
    - 2011: Ranked #6 Newcomer of the Year
- Ultimate Warrior Challenge
  - UWC Bantamweight Championship (One time)

== Mixed martial arts record ==
Professional record breakdown
19 matches	13 wins	6 losses
By knockout	4	1
By submission	2	0
By decision	7	5

Res.	Record	Opponent	Method	Event	Date	Round	Time	Location	Notes
Loss	13–6	Jesse Stirn	Decision (split)	Shogun Fights XVI	April 8, 2017	3	5:00	Baltimore, Maryland, United States	For Shogun Fights Bantamweight Championship.
Loss	13–5	Yves Jabouin	Decision (unanimous)	UFC 174	June 14, 2014	3	5:00	Vancouver, British Columbia, Canada	
Loss	13–4	T.J. Dillashaw	Decision (unanimous)	UFC Fight Night: Rockhold vs. Philippou	January 15, 2014	3	5:00	Duluth, Georgia, United States	
Loss	13–3	Brad Pickett	Decision (split)	UFC on Fuel TV: Mousasi vs. Latifi	April 6, 2013	3	5:00	Stockholm, Sweden	Fight of the Night.
Loss	13–2	Raphael Assunção	Decision (unanimous)	UFC on Fox: Henderson vs. Diaz	December 8, 2012	3	5:00	Seattle, Washington, United States	
Win	13–1	Ivan Menjivar	Decision (unanimous)	UFC 148	July 7, 2012	3	5:00	Las Vegas, Nevada, United States	
Win	12–1	Jared Papazian	Decision (majority)	UFC on FX: Guillard vs. Miller	January 20, 2012	3	5:00	Nashville, Tennessee, United States	
Win	11–1	Byron Bloodworth	TKO (knee to the body and punches)	UFC Live: Cruz vs. Johnson	October 1, 2011	2	4:52	Washington, D.C., United States	Catchweight (138 lbs.) bout.
Win	10–1	Chase Beebe	Decision (split)	UWC 7: Redemption	October 3, 2009	5	5:00	Fairfax, Virginia, United States	Defended UWC Bantamweight Championship.
Win	9–1	Josh Ferguson	Submission (guillotine choke)	UWC 6: Capital Punishment	April 25, 2009	1	4:06	Fairfax, Virginia, United States	Defended UWC Bantamweight Championship.
Win	8–1	Justin Robbins	Submission (guillotine choke)	UWC 5: Man 'O' War	February 21, 2009	3	4:44	Fairfax, Virginia, United States	Won UWC Bantamweight Championship.
Win	7–1	John Dodson	Decision (split)	UWC 4: Confrontation	October 11, 2008	3	5:00	Fairfax, Virginia, United States	
Win	6–1	Gerald Lovato	KO (punch)	UWC 3: Invasion	April 26, 2008	1	2:48	Fairfax, Virginia, United States	
Loss	5–1	Reynaldo Walter Duarte	TKO (corner stoppage)	Combat Sport Challenge	September 29, 2007	1	1:36	Richmond, Virginia, United States	Easton's corner threw in towel due to broken arm.
Win	5–0	Hudson Rocha	KO (punch)	Fury FC 2: Final Combat	November 30, 2006	2	0:45	São Paulo, Brazil	
Win	4–0	Rick Desper	Decision (unanimous)	Reality Fighting 12: Return to Boardwalk Hall	April 29, 2006	3	4:00	Atlantic City, New Jersey, United States	Bantamweight debut; Won Reality Fighting Bantamweight Championship.
Win	3–0	Jay Isip	TKO (punches)	Reality Fighting 6	April 3, 2004	2	1:42	Wildwood, New Jersey, United States	Won Reality Fighting Featherweight Championship.
Win	2–0	Jason Taylor	Decision (unanimous)	Combat Sport Challenge	January 31, 2004	2	5:00	Richmond, Virginia, United States	
Win	1–0	Anibal Torres	Decision (unanimous)	Reality Fighting 3	February 8, 2003	3	5:00	Bayonne, New Jersey, United States	

== See also ==
- List of male mixed martial artists
