= Dustin Pague =

American mixed martial artist and bare-knuckle boxer (born 1987)

- Born: Dustin William Pague; August 5, 1987 (age 39); Harrisburg, Pennsylvania, United States
- Other names: The Disciple
- Nationality: American
- Height: 5 ft 9 in (1.75 m)
- Weight: 136 lb (62 kg; 9.7 st)
- Division: Lightweight (2006–2008); Featherweight (2008–2010); Bantamweight (2011–present)
- Reach: 74.5 in (189 cm)
- Stance: Orthodox
- Fighting out of: Harrisburg, Pennsylvania, United States
- Team: Unrivaled Athletics
- Years active: 2006–present

Professional boxing record
- Total: 1
- Wins: 1
- By knockout: 1

Mixed martial arts record
- Total: 23
- Wins: 12
- By knockout: 3
- By submission: 9
- Losses: 11
- By knockout: 4
- By submission: 3
- By decision: 4

Bare-knuckle boxing record
- Total: 8
- Wins: 6
- By knockout: 4
- Losses: 2
- By knockout: 1

Other information
- Website: Official Website
- Mixed martial arts record from Sherdog

Dustin William Pague (born August 5, 1987) is an American bare-knuckle boxer and former mixed martial artist who most recently fought in the Bantamweight division of the UFC. He was a competitor on Spike TV's The Ultimate Fighter: Team Bisping vs. Team Miller, and has formerly competed as a Lightweight and Featherweight.

Pague is currently a professional boxer after announcing his switch from MMA in January 2016. He currently competes as a bare-knuckle boxer in Bare Knuckle Fighting Championship where he is the current BKFC Welterweight Champion.

== Background ==
Pague began boxing when he was 15 years old and graduated from Central Dauphin East High School, then attended Harrisburg Area Community College but transferred before eventually earning a degree. Six months after viewing a video of a UFC event, Pague began his amateur career.

After suffering a series of back injuries throughout his MMA career, Pague decided to make the transition to professional boxing as a way to continue fighting and reduce the daily strain he was putting on his back.

== Professional boxing career ==
Pague won his professional boxing debut on April 19, 2016, by unanimous decision over Rafael Davis.

== Mixed martial arts career ==
=== Early career ===
In late 2008, Pague made the decision to turn professional after a successful 7–4 amateur career. Pague's pro debut took place on October 11, 2008, against Jon Owens. The fight was contested at Featherweight instead of Lightweight, where Pague spent the entirety of his amateur career. Pague lost the fight via KO in only 18 seconds. Two months after the loss, Pague returned against John Myers. He won the fight via kimura submission in round one.

Pague built up a five-fight win streak before losing three straight fights to future TUF contestant Jeff Lentz, WEC veteran Anthony Leone, and longtime UFC veteran Din Thomas.

He built up another winning streak that earned him a title shot for the vacant Ring of Combat Bantamweight Championship. The fight marked the first time Pague fought at Bantamweight. He fought Steve De Angelis, defeating him via knockout in the second round.

Pague co-owns and operates his own gym, Disciple MMA. He also trains at the TapouT Ranch owned by Donald Cerrone.

=== The Ultimate Fighter ===
In 2011, Pague had signed with the UFC to compete on The Ultimate Fighter: Team Bisping vs. Team Miller. In the first episode, Pague fought Tateki Matsuda and won via majority decision (19-19, 20-18, 20-18) after two close rounds. The win gained Pague entry into the Ultimate Fighter house. He was selected as a part of Team Mayhem.

Pague next fought against Team Bisping's top Bantamweight pick, Louis Gaudinot. Pague won the fight in the second round via submission (rear-naked choke) to get into the semi-finals. The fight also won Pague and Gaudinot an additional $25,000 for the fan voted "Fight of the Season".

In the semi-finals Pague fought and lost to T.J. Dillashaw. Dillashaw controlled Pague on the ground throughout three rounds while landing heavy ground and pound en route to a unanimous decision.

=== Ultimate Fighting Championship ===
Pague officially made his UFC debut on December 3, 2011 at The Ultimate Fighter 14 Finale losing to John Albert via TKO in the first round. Pague was dropped by a combination from Albert in the opening moments, and then was put in the giftwrap position while getting hit with heavy ground and pound causing the referee to intervene.

Pague captured his first UFC win after defeating Jared Papazian on June 8, 2012 at UFC on FX 3. Pague won the fight via submission (rear-naked choke) in the first round.

Two weeks after his win over Papazian and with six days notice, Pague fought Ken Stone at UFC on FX 4 on June 22, 2012, replacing an injured Francisco Rivera. Pague was defeated via split decision.

Pague faced promotional newcomer Chico Camus on August 11, 2012, at UFC 150. Pague lost via unanimous decision (29-28, 30-27, 29-28).

Pague faced Yves Jabouin on June 15, 2013, at UFC 161. He lost the back-and-forth fight via split decision.

Pague faced promotional newcomer Kyoji Horiguchi on October 19, 2013 at UFC 166. Despite controlling Horiguchi for the first round, Pague lost via TKO in the second round.

On April 23, 2014, Pague was released from his UFC contract following a four-fight losing streak in the promotion.

=== Post-UFC career ===
In his first post-UFC fight, Pague faced D'Juan Owens at The Victorium: Episode 3 on July 12, 2014. He lost the fight via rear-naked choke.

== Bare-knuckle boxing ==
Pague won the BKFC Welterweight Championship on January 17, 2026 at BKFC 86 against Julian Lane in an overtime sixth round.

== Championships and accomplishments ==
=== Bare-knuckle boxing ===
- Bare Knuckle Fighting Championship
  - BKFC Welterweight Championship (One time, Current)

=== Mixed martial arts ===
- Ring of Combat
  - ROC Bantamweight Championship (One time)
- Ultimate Fighting Championship
  - Fight of the Season (The Ultimate Fighter 14)

== Personal life ==
Pague is a devoted Christian and has the word "Forgiven" tattooed across his chest.

== Bare knuckle record ==
Professional record breakdown
| 8 matches | 6 wins | 2 losses |
| By knockout | 4 | 1 |
| By decision | 2 | 0 |
| By disqualification | 0 | 1 |
| Draws | 0 | |

| Res. | Record | Opponent | Method | Event | Date | Round | Time | Location | Notes |
|---|---|---|---|---|---|---|---|---|---|
| Win | 6–2 | Julian Lane | Decision (unanimous) | BKFC 86 | January 17, 2026 | 6 | 2:00 | Uncasville, Connecticut, United States | Won the BKFC Welterweight Championship. The fight went to a sixth overtime round. |
| Win | 5–2 | Ryan Petersen | TKO | BKFC Fight Night Philly: Pague vs. Petersen | July 25, 2025 | 2 | 0:29 | Philadelphia, Pennsylvania, United States | |
| Win | 4–2 | Andrew Angelcor | TKO | BKFC Fight Night Philly: Pague vs. Angelcor | March 21, 2025 | 2 | 2:00 | Philadelphia, Pennsylvania, United States | |
| Loss | 3–2 | Carlos Trinidad-Snake | TKO | BKFC Fight Night Omaha: Trinidad-Snake vs. Pague | May 17, 2024 | 1 | 2:00 | Ralston, Nebraska, United States | |
| Win | 3–1 | Joe Elmore | Decision (unanimous) | BKFC 51 | September 30, 2023 | 5 | 2:00 | Salem, Virginia, United States | |
| Win | 2–1 | Wade Johnson | TKO | BKFC 42 | May 12, 2023 | 2 | 1:38 | Greenville, South Carolina, United States | |
| Win | 1–1 | Eddie Hoch | KO (punch) | BKFC Fight Night New York 2: Grant vs. Retic | March 12, 2022 | 1 | 0:45 | Salamanca, New York, United States | |
| Loss | 0–1 | Jake Young | DQ (repeated illegal ground strikes) | BKFC Fight Night New York: Beltran vs. Adams | November 6, 2021 | 1 | 0:57 | Salamanca, New York, United States | |

== Professional boxing record ==
1 Win (0 knockouts, 1 decisions), 0 Losses, 0 Draws, 0 No Contests
| Res. | Record | Opponent | Type | Rd., Time | Date | Location | Notes |
| Win | 1-0 | (United States) Rafael Davis | UD | 4 | 2016-04-19 | (United States) Sands Bethlehem Event Center, Bethlehem, Pennsylvania | Debut. |

== Mixed martial arts record ==
Professional record breakdown
| 23 matches | 12 wins | 11 losses |
| By knockout | 3 | 4 |
| By submission | 9 | 3 |
| By decision | 0 | 4 |

| Res. | Record | Opponent | Method | Event | Date | Round | Time | Location | Notes |
|---|---|---|---|---|---|---|---|---|---|
| Loss | 12–11 | Anthony Morgan | Submission (rear-naked choke) | World Cagefighting Championships 14 | September 4, 2015 | 2 | 2:41 | Stroudsburg, Pennsylvania, United States | Lightweight bout. |
| Win | 12–10 | Charlie Gathers | Submission (rear-naked choke) | World Cagefighting Championships 13 | March 20, 2015 | 1 | 1:52 | Lancaster, Pennsylvania, United States | |
| Loss | 11–10 | D'Juan Owens | Submission (rear-naked choke) | The Victorium: Episode 3 | July 12, 2014 | 3 | 2:52 | Hayes, Virginia, United States | |
| Loss | 11–9 | Kyoji Horiguchi | TKO (punches) | UFC 166 | October 19, 2013 | 2 | 3:51 | Houston, Texas, United States | |
| Loss | 11–8 | Yves Jabouin | Decision (split) | UFC 161 | June 15, 2013 | 3 | 5:00 | Winnipeg, Manitoba, Canada | |
| Loss | 11–7 | Chico Camus | Decision (unanimous) | UFC 150 | August 11, 2012 | 3 | 5:00 | Denver, Colorado, United States | |
| Loss | 11–6 | Ken Stone | Decision (split) | UFC on FX: Maynard vs. Guida | June 22, 2012 | 3 | 5:00 | Atlantic City, New Jersey, United States | |
| Win | 11–5 | Jared Papazian | Submission (rear-naked choke) | UFC on FX: Johnson vs. McCall | June 8, 2012 | 1 | 3:21 | Sunrise, Florida, United States | |
| Loss | 10–5 | John Albert | TKO (punches) | The Ultimate Fighter 14 Finale | December 3, 2011 | 1 | 1:09 | Las Vegas, Nevada, United States | |
| Win | 10–4 | Steve De Angelis | KO (punch) | Ring of Combat 34 | February 4, 2011 | 2 | 0:25 | Atlantic City, New Jersey, United States | Won the vacant ROC Bantamweight Championship. |
| Win | 9–4 | Bret Thomas | Submission (punches) | Shogun Fights 3 | November 13, 2010 | 1 | 2:52 | Baltimore, Maryland, United States | |
| Win | 8–4 | Dustin Caplinger | TKO (punches) | Fight Night in the Cage 1 | September 10, 2010 | 1 | 2:19 | Lancaster, Pennsylvania, United States | |
| Win | 7–4 | Scott Heckman | Submission (rear-naked choke) | Xtreme Caged Combat 2 | July 16, 2010 | 3 | 0:42 | Feasterville, Pennsylvania, United States | |
| Win | 6–4 | Justin Hickey | Technical Submission (rear-naked choke) | Ultimate Warrior Challenge 8 | May 22, 2010 | 1 | 0:54 | Fairfax, Virginia, United States | |
| Loss | 5–4 | Din Thomas | TKO (doctor stoppage) | World Extreme Fighting 41 | January 8, 2010 | 2 | 2:14 | Pittsburgh, Pennsylvania, United States | |
| Loss | 5–3 | Anthony Leone | Submission (choke) | PA Fighting Championships 1 | November 6, 2009 | 2 | 4:58 | Harrisburg, Pennsylvania, United States | |
| Loss | 5–2 | Jeff Lentz | Decision (unanimous) | The Arena Assault 1 | August 21, 2009 | 3 | 5:00 | Philadelphia, Pennsylvania, United States | |
| Win | 5–1 | Joel Roberts | TKO (punches) | Inkosi Promotions 1 | July 11, 2009 | 3 | 3:14 | Bushkill, Pennsylvania, United States | |
| Win | 4–1 | Will Childs | Submission (armbar) | The Smoky Mountain Brawl | May 9, 2009 | 1 | 1:47 | Asheville, North Carolina, United States | |
| Win | 3–1 | Biff Walizer | Submission (rear-naked choke) | Respect Is Earned 2 | April 30, 2009 | 3 | 3:03 | Oaks, Pennsylvania, United States | |
| Win | 2–1 | Charles Cooper | Submission (ankle lock) | Southern Fight League 2 | March 28, 2009 | 1 | 0:45 | Greenville, North Carolina, United States | |
| Win | 1–1 | John Myers | Submission (triangle choke) | Southern Fight League 1 | December 7, 2008 | 1 | 1:05 | Greenville, North Carolina, United States | |
| Loss | 0–1 | Jon Owens | KO (punch) | The Carolina Crown | October 11, 2008 | 1 | 0:18 | Raleigh, North Carolina, United States | |

== Amateur mixed martial arts record ==
Professional record breakdown
| 11 matches | 7 wins | 4 losses |
| By knockout | 1 | 0 |
| By submission | 6 | 1 |
| By decision | 0 | 2 |
| By disqualification | 0 | 1 |

| Res. | Record | Opponent | Method | Event | Date | Round | Time | Location | Notes |
|---|---|---|---|---|---|---|---|---|---|
| Win | 7–4 | Joey Ponce | Submission (triangle choke) | Valhalla MMA 8 | September 6, 2008 | 1 | 1:20 | Richmond, Virginia, United States | |
| Win | 6–4 | Don Torrenti | Submission (armbar) | Valhalla MMA 7 | August 9, 2008 | 1 | 0:26 | Sterling, Virginia, United States | |
| Win | 5–4 | Justin Dalton | Submission (rear-naked choke) | Total Cage Combat: Retaliation | June 14, 2008 | 1 | 0:43 | Richmond, Virginia, United States | |
| Loss | 4–4 | Khris Gonzalez | Decision (unanimous) | Valhalla MMA 4 | January 19, 2008 | 3 | 5:00 | Richmond, Virginia, United States | For the Valhalla Amateur Lightweight Championship. |
| Win | 4–3 | Doug Hunsucker | Submission (rear-naked choke) | Valhalla MMA 3: Domination | November 10, 2007 | 3 | 1:38 | Fort Lee, Virginia, United States | |
| Loss | 3–3 | Luiz Rodrigues | Decision (unanimous) | Valhalla MMA 2 | September 1, 2007 | 3 | 5:00 | Virginia, United States | For the Valhalla Amateur Lightweight Championship. |
| Win | 3–2 | Joey Allen | TKO (punches) | Combat Sports Challenge 19 | March 24, 2007 | 1 | 0:34 | United States | |
| Win | 2–2 | Doug Hunsucker | Submission (rear-naked choke) | CSC 17: River City Rumble 4 | September 30, 2006 | 2 | N/A | Mechanicsville, Virginia, United States | |
| Loss | 1–2 | Jared Weiner | Submission (rear-naked choke) | CSC 15: East Coast Brawl 6 | June 17, 2006 | 1 | 1:52 | Fredericksburg, Virginia, United States | |
| Loss | 1–1 | Siyam Yousefi | Disqualification | CSC 14: River City Rumble 3 | April 29, 2006 | 1 | N/A | Mechanicsville, Virginia, United States | |
| Win | 1–0 | Zac Allen | Submission (triangle choke) | CSC 12: River City Rumble 2 | February 18, 2006 | 1 | 3:09 | Mechanicsville, Virginia, United States | Amateur debut. |
