= Charlie Brenneman =

American mixed martial arts fighter

- Born: Charles Brenneman; February 9, 1981 (age 45); Hollidaysburg, Pennsylvania, U.S.
- Nickname: The Spaniard
- Height: 5 ft 10 in (1.78 m)
- Weight: 155 lb (70 kg; 11.1 st)
- Division: Welterweight; Lightweight
- Reach: 72 in (180 cm)
- Style: Wrestling
- Stance: Orthodox
- Fighting out of: Hollidaysburg, Pennsylvania, U.S.
- Team: AMA Fight Club
- Trainer: Mike Constantino
- Rank: Purple belt in Brazilian Jiu-Jitsu
- Wrestling: NCAA Div I wrestler
- Years active: 2007–2014

Mixed martial arts record
- Total: 27
- Wins: 19
- By knockout: 5
- By submission: 5
- By decision: 9
- Losses: 8
- By knockout: 4
- By submission: 3
- By decision: 1

Other information
- Mixed martial arts record from Sherdog

Charles Brenneman (born February 9, 1981) is an American former mixed martial artist. A professional from 2007 until 2014, he competed for the UFC, ShoXC, and was the winner of the first season of the television show Pros vs Joes.

== Background ==
Brenneman was born to Charles and Marie Brenneman in Hollidaysburg, Pennsylvania, the youngest of the four Brenneman children. He wrestled throughout his elementary and high school career. Upon graduating from Hollidaysburg Area High School in 1999, Brenneman attended Lock Haven University, where he continued wrestling and finished his collegiate wrestling career with a Top-12 finish at Nationals.

Brenneman earned his Bachelor of Arts in Secondary Education/Spanish from Lock Haven University, and returned to his hometown to teach Spanish at his former high school for three years, which is where his nickname 'the Spaniard' came from. He continued his education, earning his Master of Arts from East Stroudsburg University of Pennsylvania in Sports Management. It was during the first season of the Pros vs Joes game show when he first received national public attention. He was unexpectedly cast after submitting his application to participate in the reality game show, but he won the competition alongside his older brother Ben. Following his victory on the Pros vs. Joes show, Brenneman resigned from his high school teaching job to pursue a mixed martial arts fighting career.

== Fighting career ==
During his amateur career, Brenneman compiled a 5–0 undefeated record. In an attempt to maintain his momentum, he quickly turned professional, debuting on July 28, 2007, against Marcello Olivera. Brenneman also earned a 5–0 record at the professional level through early 2008, with a notable split-decision victory over Drew Puzon at the ShoXC event on January 25, 2008.

=== 2008 injury and AMA Fight Club ===
During a sparring session with one-time UFC fighter Chris Liguori, Brenneman sustained a kick to the face that shattered his left orbital and forced him to undergo emergency surgery to repair the damage. Vertical and lateral plates were inserted into his face, and he eventually regained vision in his left eye. Brenneman made his comeback to competition on September 12, 2008, against John Howard, but suffered the first loss of his career. Because of the defeat, the self-trained Brenneman decided to join the AMA Fight Club, and went on to win his next six bouts before being offered a contract for the Ultimate Fighting Championship (UFC).

=== Ultimate Fighting Championship ===
Brenneman made his UFC debut on the preliminary card of UFC Fight Night: Florian vs. Gomi against Jason High, whom he defeated via unanimous decision (30–27, 30–27, 29–28).

In his next fight, Brenneman lost to Johny Hendricks at UFC 117 via TKO in the second round.

Brenneman faced Amilcar Alves on January 22, 2011, at UFC Fight Night 23. He won the fight via unanimous decision.

Brenneman was scheduled to fight T. J. Grant on June 26, 2011 at UFC on Versus 4, but Grant had to pull out due to illness and the fight was scrapped. However, just hours before the weigh-ins it was reported that Nate Marquardt did not receive medical clearance and had to pull out of his bout against Rick Story. As a result, Brenneman fought Story in the evening's co-main event. Brenneman upset the favored Story, as Brenneman was able to out wrestle Story and control him on the ground while fending off multiple submission attempts in the third round en route to a unanimous decision victory. He later stated about his upset win, that he'd luckily been told about being Marquardt's replacement for this fight earlier than Story and was also training for a fight with Story as well because of this, just in case he turned out to be the replacement, which he was.

Brenneman lost to Anthony Johnson via first-round TKO due to a head kick on October 1, 2011 at UFC Live: Cruz vs. Johnson.

Brenneman next faced Daniel Roberts on January 20, 2012 at UFC on FX: Guillard vs. Miller. He won the fight via unanimous decision.

Brenneman faced Erick Silva on June 8, 2012 at UFC on FX 3 and lost via rear-naked choke near the end of the first round.

Brenneman was expected to face Kyle Noke on September 1, 2012 at UFC 151. However, as a result of the cancellation of UFC 151, Noke/Brenneman was rescheduled for September 22, 2012 at UFC 152. Brenneman lost the fight in the first round via TKO due to punches. After the loss Brenneman was released from the promotion.

=== Post UFC ===
Brenneman cut down to 155 lbs. following his release from the UFC. Brenneman fought Eric Irvin at VFL 40 on Jan 19, 2013. He won via second round submission. Brenneman defeated Jeremy Castro and Gemiyale Adkins in the Cage Fury Fighting Championships, and would then defeat Kyle Baker by submission via arm-triangle choke for the vacant CFFC lightweight title.

=== Return to UFC ===
Brenneman returned to the UFC and faced promotional newcomer Beneil Dariush in a lightweight bout on January 15, 2014 at UFC Fight Night 35, replacing an injured Jason High. Brenneman was quickly submitted in the first round via rear-naked choke, after being dropped by a left hand.

Brenneman faced Danny Castillo at UFC 172. After a back-and-forth first round, Brenneman lost via knockout early in the second round.

Brenneman faced Leandro Silva on November 8, 2014 at UFC Fight Night 56. Brenneman was submitted by a rear naked choke in the first round following multiple takedown attempts. After the loss Brenneman was again released from the promotion.

== Personal life ==
Brenneman and his wife Amanda have a daughter, born in 2013 and a son, born in 2016.

== Championships and accomplishments ==
=== Mixed Martial Arts ===
- Ultimate Fighting Championship
  - UFC.com Awards
    - 2011: Ranked #4 Upset of the Year vs. Rick Story
- Cage Fury Fighting Championships
  - CFFC Lightweight Championship (One time)
- Ring of Combat
  - ROC Welterweight Championship (One time)
- Valley Fight League
  - VFL Welterweight Championship (One time)

=== Amateur wrestling ===
- National Collegiate Athletic Association
  - NCAA Division I National Qualifier out of Lehigh University (2004)
- Pennsylvania Interscholastic Athletic Association
  - Pennsylvania AAA state runner-up out of Hollidaysburg Area High School (1998, 1999)

== Mixed martial arts record ==
Professional record breakdown
27 matches	19 wins	8 losses
By knockout	5	4
By submission	5	3
By decision	9	1

Res.	Record	Opponent	Method	Event	Date	Round	Time	Location	Notes
Loss	19–8	Leandro Silva	Submission (rear-naked choke)	UFC Fight Night: Shogun vs. Saint Preux	November 8, 2014	1	4:15	Uberlândia, Brazil	
Loss	19–7	Danny Castillo	KO (punch)	UFC 172	April 26, 2014	2	0:21	Baltimore, Maryland, United States	
Loss	19–6	Beneil Dariush	Submission (rear-naked choke)	UFC Fight Night: Rockhold vs. Philippou	January 15, 2014	1	1:45	Duluth, Georgia, United States	
Win	19–5	Kyle Baker	Submission (arm-triangle choke)	CFFC 28: Brenneman vs. Baker	October 26, 2013	2	4:07	Atlantic City, New Jersey, United States	Won the CFFC Lightweight Championship.
Win	18–5	Gemiyale Adkins	Decision (unanimous)	CFFC 25: Williams vs. Faunce	June 22, 2013	3	5:00	King of Prussia, Pennsylvania, United States	
Win	17–5	Jeremy Castro	Submission (Peruvian necktie)	CFFC 23: La Nsang vs. Baker	April 12, 2013	1	4:34	King of Prussia, Pennsylvania, United States	
Win	16–5	Eric Irvin	Submission (rear-naked choke)	VFL 40: Broad Avenue Brawlers	January 19, 2013	2	2:09	Altoona, Pennsylvania, United States	Lightweight debut.
Loss	15–5	Kyle Noke	TKO (punches)	UFC 152	September 22, 2012	1	0:45	Toronto, Ontario, Canada	
Loss	15–4	Erick Silva	Submission (rear-naked choke)	UFC on FX: Johnson vs. McCall	June 8, 2012	1	4:33	Sunrise, Florida, United States	
Win	15–3	Daniel Roberts	Decision (unanimous)	UFC on FX: Guillard vs. Miller	January 20, 2012	3	5:00	Nashville, Tennessee, United States	
Loss	14–3	Anthony Johnson	TKO (head kick)	UFC Live: Cruz vs. Johnson	October 1, 2011	1	2:49	Washington D.C., United States	
Win	14–2	Rick Story	Decision (unanimous)	UFC Live: Kongo vs. Barry	June 26, 2011	3	5:00	Pittsburgh, Pennsylvania, United States	
Win	13–2	Amilcar Alves	Decision (unanimous)	UFC: Fight For The Troops 2	January 22, 2011	3	5:00	Fort Hood, Texas, United States	
Loss	12–2	Johny Hendricks	TKO (punches)	UFC 117	August 7, 2010	2	0:40	Oakland, California, United States	
Win	12–1	Jason High	Decision (unanimous)	UFC Fight Night: Florian vs. Gomi	March 31, 2010	3	5:00	Charlotte, North Carolina, United States	
Win	11–1	George Sheppard	Submission (punches)	VFL 23: Mason Dixon Showdown 2	January 30, 2010	2	1:55	Greencastle, Pennsylvania, United States	Non-title bout.
Win	10–1	Phillip Wyman	TKO (punches)	VFL 21: Broad Avenue Brawlers 2	October 11, 2009	1	3:39	Altoona, Pennsylvania, United States	Won the VFL Welterweight Championship.
Win	9–1	Mitch Whitesel	Decision (unanimous)	VFL 19: Broad Avenue Brawlers	July 24, 2009	3	5:00	Altoona, Pennsylvania, United States	
Win	8–1	Chris Thomas	Submission (arm-triangle choke)	Iron Will Fighting Championship 1	May 16, 2009	2	1:17	Johnstown, Pennsylvania, United States	
Win	7–1	Edward O'Daniel	TKO (elbows)	Extreme Challenge: The War at the Shore	January 23, 2009	2	4:22	Atlantic City, New Jersey, United States	
Win	6–1	Yanish Dimitry	TKO (punches)	United States Fight League: War in the Woods 5	November 29, 2008	1	4:50	Ledyard, Connecticut, United States	
Loss	5–1	John Howard	Decision (unanimous)	Ring of Combat 21	September 12, 2008	3	5:00	Atlantic City, New Jersey, United States	For the vacant ROC Welterweight Championship.
Win	5–0	Drew Puzon	Decision (split)	ShoXC: Elite Challenger Series	January 25, 2008	3	5:00	Atlantic City, New Jersey, United States	
Win	4–0	Mark Berrocal	TKO (punches)	ROC 17: Beast of the Northeast Finals	November 30, 2007	2	3:54	Atlantic City, New Jersey, United States	Won the Ring of Combat Welterweight Championship; Brenneman later vacated title to sign with EliteXC.
Win	3–0	Joseph Aviles	Decision (unanimous)	ROC 16: Beast of the Northeast Semi-Finals	October 26, 2007	3	4:00	Atlantic City, New Jersey, United States	
Win	2–0	Jordan Damon	TKO (doctor stoppage)	ROC 15: Beast of the Northeast Quarterfinals	September 7, 2007	1	2:20	Atlantic City, New Jersey, United States	
Win	1–0	Marcelo Oliveira	Decision (unanimous)	Extreme Challenge 81	July 28, 2007	3	5:00	West Orange, New Jersey, United States	

== See also ==
- Hybrid martial arts
- Mixed Martial Arts (MMA)
- Ultimate Fighting Championship (UFC)
