= UFC 132 =

UFC mixed martial arts event in 2011

UFC 132: Cruz vs. Faber
- The poster for UFC 132: Cruz vs. Faber
- Promotion: Ultimate Fighting Championship
- Date: July 2, 2011
- Venue: MGM Grand Garden Arena
- City: Paradise, Nevada
- Attendance: 13,109
- Total gate: $2,304,500
- Buyrate: 350,000

Event chronology
UFC Live: Kongo vs. Barry	UFC 132: Cruz vs. Faber	UFC 133: Evans vs. Ortiz

UFC 132: Cruz vs. Faber was a mixed martial arts event held by the Ultimate Fighting Championship on July 2, 2011, at the MGM Grand Garden Arena in the Las Vegas suburb of Paradise, Nevada.

== Background ==
UFC 132 was originally set to feature a rematch between B.J. Penn and Jon Fitch, but both were forced to withdraw because of injuries.

Evan Dunham was expected to face George Sotiropoulos at the event, but was forced off the card with an injury and replaced by Rafael dos Anjos.

Jason Miller was scheduled to face Aaron Simpson at this event. However, Miller was removed from the card after accepting a coaching position on The Ultimate Fighter 14, and replaced by Brad Tavares.

Cub Swanson was expected to face Erik Koch at this event, but was forced from the bout with an injury. Koch was instead moved to UFC Fight Night 25 to take on Jonathan Brookins.

UFC 132 featured two preliminary fights live on Spike TV and the remainder of the preliminary bouts streamed on Facebook.

== Results ==
Main card
Weight class				Method	Round	Time	Notes
Bantamweight	Dominick Cruz (c)	def.	Urijah Faber	Decision (unanimous) (50–45, 49–46, 48–47)	5	5:00	(Note: For the UFC Bantamweight Championship)
Middleweight	Chris Leben	def.	Wanderlei Silva	KO (punches)	1	0:27
Lightweight	Dennis Siver	def.	Matt Wiman	Decision (unanimous) (29–28, 29–28, 29–28)	3	5:00
Light Heavyweight	Tito Ortiz	def.	Ryan Bader	Submission (guillotine choke)	1	1:56
Welterweight	Carlos Condit	def.	Dong Hyun Kim	KO (flying knee and punches)	1	2:58
Preliminary card (Spike TV)
Weight class				Method	Round	Time	Notes
Lightweight	Melvin Guillard	def.	Shane Roller	KO (punches)	1	2:12	(Note: This bout aired on the broadcast following the Siver vs Wiman bout.)
Lightweight	Rafael dos Anjos	def.	George Sotiropoulos	KO (punch)	1	0:59
Preliminary card (Facebook)
Weight class				Method	Round	Time	Notes
Bantamweight	Brian Bowles	def.	Takeya Mizugaki	Decision (unanimous) (29–28, 30–27, 30–27)	3	5:00
Middleweight	Aaron Simpson	def.	Brad Tavares	Decision (unanimous) (30–27, 30–27, 30–27)	3	5:00
Lightweight	Anthony Njokuani	def.	Andre Winner	Decision (unanimous) (30–27, 30–26, 30–26)	3	5:00
Bantamweight	Jeff Hougland	def.	Donny Walker	Decision (unanimous) (29–28, 29–28, 30–27)	3	5:00	(Note: This bout aired on the broadcast following the Cruz vs Faber bout.)

== Bonus awards ==
The following fighters received $75,000 bonuses.

- Fight of the Night: Dominick Cruz vs. Urijah Faber
- Knockout of the Night: Carlos Condit
- Submission of the Night: Tito Ortiz

== Reported payout ==
The following is the reported payout to the fighters as reported to the Nevada State Athletic Commission. It does not include sponsor money or "locker room" bonuses often given by the UFC and also do not include the UFC's traditional "fight night" bonuses.

- Dominick Cruz: $40,000 ($20,000 win bonus) def. Urijah Faber: $32,000
- Chris Leben: $92,000 ($46,000 win bonus) def. Wanderlei Silva: $200,000
- Dennis Siver: $50,000 ($25,000 win bonus) def. Matt Wiman: $18,000
- Tito Ortiz: $450,000 (no win bonus) def. Ryan Bader: $20,000
- Carlos Condit: $68,000 ($34,000 win bonus) def. Dong Hyun Kim: $41,000
- Melvin Guillard: $64,000 ($32,000 win bonus) def. Shane Roller: $21,000
- Rafael dos Anjos: $28,000 ($14,000 win bonus) def. George Sotiropoulos: $15,000
- Brian Bowles: $34,000 ($17,000 win bonus) def. Takeya Mizugaki: $12,000
- Aaron Simpson: $34,000 ($17,000 win bonus) def. Brad Tavares: $10,000
- Anthony Njokuani: $16,000 ($8,000 win bonus) def. Andre Winner: $14,000
- Jeff Hougland: $12,000 ($6,000 win bonus) def. Donny Walker: $6,000
