= North American Allied Fight Series =

MMA promoter based in Ohio

North American Allied Fighter Series
- Company type: Private
- Industry: Mixed martial arts promotion
- Founded: 2005
- Headquarters: Uniontown, Ohio, United States
- Key people: Greg Kalikas - CEO; Bryan Clark - Director of Operations; Mike Mercer - VP
- Website: http://naafs.tv/

The North American Allied Fight Series (NAAFS) was an Ohio-based mixed martial arts promotion, having put on over 125 events. The weekly NAAFS Cage Fighting series airs regionally on SportsTime Ohio, nationally on Direct TV and Dish Network, and internationally on G-TV. NAAFS also works closely with the national MMA promotion Bellator Fighting Championships to fill open spots on their cards.

== NAAFS alumni ==
- Stipe Miocic
- Cody Garbrandt
- Jeff Monson
- Katlyn Chookagian
- Matt Brown
- Ben Rothwell
- Phil Davis
- Jason Dent
- Sean Salmon
- Dave Herman
- Brian Rogers
- Donny Walker
- Frank Caraballo
- John Hawk
- Brian Camozzi
- Vanessa Demopoulos
