= UFC Fight Night: Florian vs. Gomi =

UFC mixed martial arts event in 2010

- The poster for UFC Fight Night: Florian vs. Gomi
- Promotion: Ultimate Fighting Championship
- Date: March 31, 2010
- Venue: Bojangles' Coliseum
- City: Charlotte, North Carolina
- Attendance: 7,700
- Total gate: $590,685

Event chronology
UFC 111: St-Pierre vs. Hardy	UFC Fight Night: Florian vs. Gomi	UFC 112: Invincible

UFC Fight Night: Florian vs. Gomi (also known as UFC Fight Night 21) was a mixed martial arts event held by the Ultimate Fighting Championship on March 31, 2010 at Bojangles' Coliseum in Charlotte, North Carolina, This was the third time the UFC held an event in Charlotte, but the first since UFC 5, also at the same venue.

== Background ==
The event was the third UFC event in under two weeks along with UFC LIVE: Vera vs. Jones and UFC 111. The event also served as the lead-in program for The Ultimate Fighter 11.

Cole Miller was scheduled to face Andre Winner, but was forced from the card with an injury and replaced by Rafaello Oliveira.

A brief blackout occurred in the Bojangles' Coliseum when Roy Nelson vs. Stefan Struve was being announced.

== Results ==
Main card
Weight class				Method	Round	Time	Notes
Lightweight	Kenny Florian	def.	Takanori Gomi	Submission (rear-naked choke)	3	2:52
Heavyweight	Roy Nelson	def.	Stefan Struve	TKO (punches)	1	0:39
Middleweight	Jorge Rivera	def.	Nate Quarry	TKO (punches)	2	0:29
Lightweight	Ross Pearson	def.	Dennis Siver	Decision (unanimous) (30–27, 30–27, 30–27)	3	5:00
Preliminary card
Lightweight	Andre Winner	def.	Rafaello Oliveira	Decision (unanimous) (30–27, 29–28, 30–27)	3	5:00
Lightweight	Jacob Volkmann	def.	Ronys Torres	Decision (split) (28–29, 30–27, 30–27)	3	5:00
Lightweight	Nik Lentz	def.	Rob Emerson	Decision (unanimous) (29–28, 30–27, 29–28)	3	5:00
Lightweight	Gleison Tibau	def.	Caol Uno	TKO (punches)	1	4:13	(Note: This bout aired on the broadcast following the Rivera vs Quarry bout.)
Middleweight	Yushin Okami	def.	Lucio Linhares	TKO (doctor stoppage)	2	2:47
Middleweight	Gerald Harris	def.	Mario Miranda	TKO (punches)	1	4:49
Welterweight	Charlie Brenneman	def.	Jason High	Decision (unanimous) (30–27, 30–27. 29–28)	3	5:00

== Bonus awards ==
The following fighters received $30,000 bonuses.

- Fight of the Night: Ross Pearson vs. Dennis Siver
- Knockout of the Night: Roy Nelson
- Submission of the Night: Kenny Florian

== See also ==
- Ultimate Fighting Championship
- List of UFC champions
- List of UFC events
- 2010 in UFC
