= UFC Live: Cruz vs. Johnson =

UFC mixed martial arts event in 2011

- The poster for UFC Live: Cruz vs. Johnson
- Promotion: Ultimate Fighting Championship
- Date: October 1, 2011
- Venue: Verizon Center
- City: Washington, D.C.
- Attendance: 9,380
- Total gate: $706,775

Event chronology
UFC 135: Jones vs. Rampage	UFC Live: Cruz vs. Johnson	UFC 136: Edgar vs. Maynard III

UFC Live: Cruz vs. Johnson (also known as UFC on Versus 6) was a mixed martial arts event held by the Ultimate Fighting Championship on October 1, 2011, at the Verizon Center in Washington, D.C.

== Background ==
This event featured a UFC Bantamweight Championship bout between champion Dominick Cruz and #1 contender Demetrious Johnson, which was the first UFC title fight to be aired live at a free televised UFC event since UFC 75 in September 2007.

Fabio Maldonado was expected to face Aaron Rosa in a Light Heavyweight bout, but was pulled from the card due to an injury. A replacement was being sought but this fight was scrapped.

Jeff Hougland was expected to face Mike Easton in a Bantamweight bout, but has been injured and replaced by UFC newcomer Byron Bloodworth. Bloodworth failed to make the 135 pound weight limit, thus the match was changed to a Catchweight bout, with Bloodworth being fined for the infraction.

With Fox taking over UFC broadcasting rights in 2012, this was the last UFC and Zuffa event to be aired on Versus.

== Results ==
Main Card (Versus)
Weight class				Method	Round	Time	Notes
Bantamweight	Dominick Cruz (c)	def	Demetrious Johnson	Decision (unanimous) (50–45, 49–46, 50–45)	5	5:00	(Note: For the UFC Bantamweight Championship.)
Heavyweight	Stefan Struve	def.	Pat Barry	Submission (triangle choke)	2	3:22
Welterweight	Anthony Johnson	def.	Charlie Brenneman	KO (head kick)	1	2:49
Lightweight	Matt Wiman	def.	Mac Danzig	Decision (unanimous) (29–28, 29–28, 29–28)	3	5:00
Preliminary card (Facebook)
Lightweight	Yves Edwards	def.	Rafaello Oliveira	TKO (head kick and punches)	2	2:44
Lightweight	Paul Sass	def.	Michael Johnson	Submission (heel hook)	1	3:00
Catchweight (138 lb)	Mike Easton	def.	Byron Bloodworth	TKO (knees and punches)	2	4:52
Lightweight	T. J. Grant	def.	Shane Roller	Submission (armbar)	3	2:12
Welterweight	Josh Neer	def.	Keith Wisniewski	TKO (doctor stoppage)	2	5:00
Bantamweight	Walel Watson	def.	Joseph Sandoval	TKO (punches)	1	1:17

== Bonus awards ==
The following fighters received $65,000 bonuses.

- Fight of the Night: Matt Wiman vs. Mac Danzig
- Knockout of the Night: Anthony Johnson
- Submission of the Night: Stefan Struve

== See also ==
- List of UFC events
