= TJ Grant =

Canadian mixed martial arts fighter

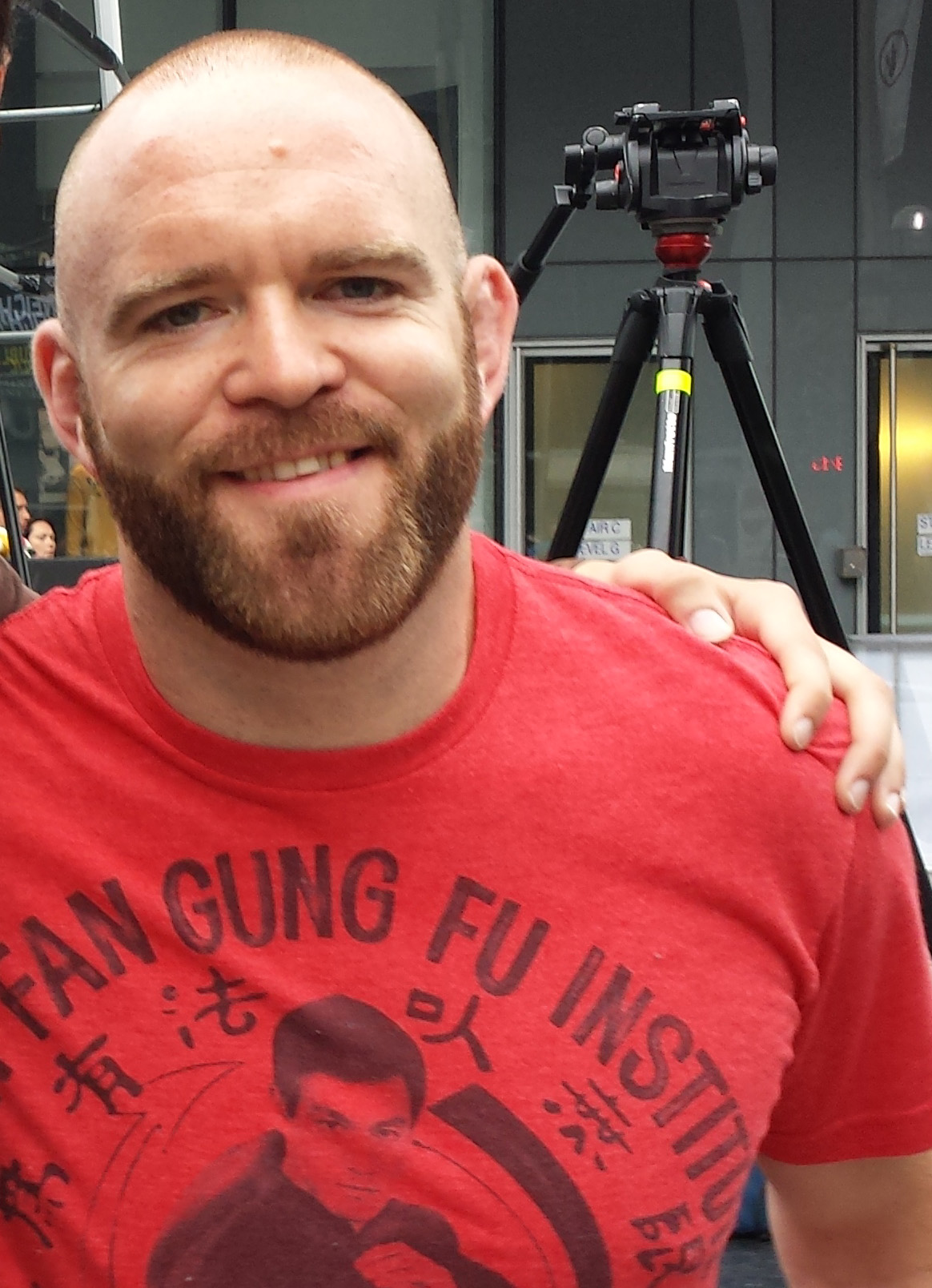
- Born: February 26, 1984 (age 42); Halifax, Nova Scotia, Canada
- Height: 5 ft 10 in (1.78 m)
- Weight: 155 lb (70 kg; 11.1 st)
- Division: Lightweight (2011–2013); Welterweight (2006–2011)
- Reach: 72 1/2 in (184 cm)
- Stance: Orthodox
- Fighting out of: Cole Harbour, Nova Scotia
- Team: Grant’s Martial Arts Academy
- Rank: Black belt in Brazilian Jiu-Jitsu
- Years active: 2006–2013

Mixed martial arts record
- Total: 26
- Wins: 21
- By knockout: 4
- By submission: 13
- By decision: 4
- Losses: 5
- By submission: 1
- By decision: 4

Other information
- Mixed martial arts record from Sherdog

TJ Grant (born February 26, 1984) is a Canadian retired mixed martial artist who competed in the Lightweight division of the Ultimate Fighting Championship.

== Background ==
Grant began training in Brazilian jiu-jitsu at the age of 15 and then also began wrestling, later going on to compete at Cole Harbour District High School. Grant was a three-time Wrestling Champion in his province in 2001, 2002, and 2004 and also represented Nova Scotia at the 2001 Canada Games in London, Ontario. Grant has also won several competitions in submission wrestling and Brazilian jiu-jitsu in his home country of Canada.

== Mixed martial arts career ==
=== Early career ===
Grant made his professional mixed martial arts debut in 2007 and compiled a record of 13-2 before being signed by the UFC.

=== Ultimate Fighting Championship ===
Grant debuted at UFC 97 with an upset split decision victory over Japanese veteran Ryo Chonan.

Grant next fought South Korean Dong Hyun Kim at UFC 100. He lost a unanimous decision (30-26, 30-26, 30-26).

Grant then defeated Kevin Burns via first-round TKO on December 12, 2009, at UFC 107. The performance earned Grant Knockout of the Night honors.

Grant faced future UFC Welterweight Champion Johny Hendricks on May 8, 2010, at UFC 113. Grant lost via majority decision after having a point deducted due to groin strikes.

Grant defeated Julio Paulino on September 25, 2010, at UFC 119 via unanimous decision (30-27, 30-27, 30-27).

Grant next faced Brazilian Ricardo Almeida on December 11, 2010, at UFC 124. He lost the fight via unanimous decision.

Grant was expected to face Matthew Riddle on June 26, 2011, at UFC on Versus 4. However, Riddle was forced from the bout with an injury and replaced by Charlie Brenneman. Then, just days before the event, Grant was forced out the Brenneman bout with an illness. Since there was not enough time to find a suitable replacement, the bout was scrapped.

Grant dropped down to Lightweight for the first time in his career and faced Shane Roller on October 1, 2011, at UFC on Versus 6. After controlling the fight on the ground for the first two rounds, Grant attempted an armbar in the middle of the third round. Although the submission looked tight, referee Fernando Yamasaki stopped the bout due to Roller's audible pain, although Roller did not appear to have tapped out. Despite Roller's protest, Grant was declared winner by technical submission.

Grant was expected to face Jacob Volkmann on December 30, 2011, at UFC 141. However, Grant was forced from the bout with an injury and replaced by Efraín Escudero.

Grant faced Carlo Prater on May 15, 2012, at UFC on Fuel TV: Korean Zombie vs. Poirier. Grant defeated Prater via unanimous decision.

Grant faced Evan Dunham on September 22, 2012, at UFC 152. Grant won the fight via unanimous decision and won a $65,000 Fight of the Night bonus along with Dunham.

Grant faced Matt Wiman on January 26, 2013, at UFC on Fox 6. He won the fight in dominant fashion, finishing off Wiman with a series of elbows and punches at the end of the first round.

Grant faced then UFC #3 Lightweight Contender Gray Maynard at UFC 160 on May 25, 2013. UFC president Dana White announced at the UFC on Fox 7 post-fight press conference that he expected the winner of the Maynard/Grant fight to get a UFC Lightweight title shot. Grant won the fight via TKO in the first round after knocking Maynard down with a straight right hand on the jaw, earning Knockout of the Night honors.

Grant was expected to face then UFC Lightweight Champion Benson Henderson on August 31, 2013, at UFC 164. However, Grant was forced out of the bout with an injury and was replaced by Anthony Pettis, who won the championship.

A bout with Pettis was targeted for December 14, 2013, at UFC on Fox 9. However, Grant revealed in mid-September that he has yet to be medically cleared after suffering a concussion in training and would not be eligible to compete on December 14 and opted to decline the bout. Pettis eventually withdrew from the bout as well, sustaining an injury of his own.

On May 5, 2014, both TJ Grant and fellow UFC fighter Nate Diaz were removed from the UFC’s Lightweight rankings after being deemed inactive by the UFC.

Grant is currently retired from fighting. He owns and operates Grant’s Martial Arts Academy in Dartmouth Nova Scotia since 2020.

== Championships and accomplishments ==
- Canadian Pro-Wrestling Hall of Fame
  - Class of 2024 (MMA Wing)
- Ultimate Fighting Championship
  - Knockout of the Night (Two times)
  - Fight of the Night (One time)
  - UFC.com Awards
    - 2009: Ranked #5 Upset of the Year vs. Ryo Chonan
    - 2013: Ranked #3 Upset of the Year vs. Gray Maynard

== Mixed martial arts record ==
Professional record breakdown
26 matches	21 wins	5 losses
By knockout	4	0
By submission	13	1
By decision	4	4

Res.	Record	Opponent	Method	Event	Date	Round	Time	Location	Notes
Win	21–5	Gray Maynard	TKO (punches)	UFC 160	May 25, 2013	1	2:07	Las Vegas, Nevada, United States	UFC Lightweight title eliminator. Knockout of the Night.
Win	20–5	Matt Wiman	KO (elbows and punches)	UFC on Fox: Johnson vs. Dodson	January 26, 2013	1	4:51	Chicago, Illinois, United States	
Win	19–5	Evan Dunham	Decision (unanimous)	UFC 152	September 22, 2012	3	5:00	Toronto, Ontario, Canada	Fight of the Night
Win	18–5	Carlo Prater	Decision (unanimous)	UFC on Fuel TV: Korean Zombie vs. Poirier	May 15, 2012	3	5:00	Fairfax, Virginia United States	
Win	17–5	Shane Roller	Technical Submission (armbar)	UFC Live: Cruz vs. Johnson	October 1, 2011	3	2:12	Washington, D.C. United States	Lightweight debut.
Loss	16–5	Ricardo Almeida	Decision (unanimous)	UFC 124	December 11, 2010	3	5:00	Montreal, Quebec, Canada	
Win	16–4	Julio Paulino	Decision (unanimous)	UFC 119	September 25, 2010	3	5:00	Indianapolis, Indiana, United States	
Loss	15–4	Johny Hendricks	Decision (majority)	UFC 113	May 8, 2010	3	5:00	Montreal, Quebec, Canada	
Win	15–3	Kevin Burns	TKO (punches)	UFC 107	December 12, 2009	1	4:57	Memphis, Tennessee, United States	Knockout of the Night.
Loss	14–3	Dong Hyun Kim	Decision (unanimous)	UFC 100	July 11, 2009	3	5:00	Las Vegas, Nevada, United States	
Win	14–2	Ryo Chonan	Decision (split)	UFC 97	April 18, 2009	3	5:00	Montreal, Quebec, Canada	
Win	13–2	Beau Baker	Submission (armbar)	PFP: Wanted	November 29, 2008	3	3:03	Dartmouth, Nova Scotia, Canada	
Win	12–2	Forrest Petz	Submission (arm-triangle choke)	TKO 35: Quenneville vs. Hioki	October 3, 2008	2	3:55	Montreal, Quebec, Canada	
Win	11–2	Chad Reiner	Submission (kimura)	PFP: Last Man Standing	June 21, 2008	3	4:15	Dartmouth, Nova Scotia, Canada	
Win	10–2	Mike Gates	Submission (armbar)	PFP: Street Justice	April 26, 2008	2	3:29	Halifax, Nova Scotia, Canada	
Loss	9–2	Jesse Bongfeldt	Submission (armbar)	TKO 32: Ultimatum	February 28, 2008	3	2:52	Montreal, Quebec, Canada	
Win	9–1	Stephan Lamarche	Submission (kimura)	KOTC: Avalanche	December 15, 2007	3	4:56	Moncton, New Brunswick, Canada	
Win	8–1	Stephane Dube	Submission (heel hook)	TKO 30: Apocalypse	September 28, 2007	1	2:16	Montreal, Quebec, Canada	
Win	7–1	Kevin Manderson	Submission (rear-naked choke)	KOTC: Supremacy	July 14, 2007	1	2:52	Halifax, Nova Scotia, Canada	
Loss	6–1	Gary Wright	Decision (unanimous)	KOTC: Megiddo	April 28, 2007	3	5:00	Vernon, British Columbia, Canada	
Win	6–0	Elmer Waterhen	Submission (armbar)	KOTC: Capital Chaos	March 28, 2007	1	2:20	Hull, Quebec, Canada	
Win	5–0	Nicholas Portieous	Submission (armbar)	KOTC: Freedom Fight	January 20, 2007	1	0:45	Gatineau, Quebec, Canada	
Win	4–0	Eric Beaulieu	TKO (punches)	ECC 4: Fury	December 2, 2006	1	0:33	Halifax, Nova Scotia, Canada	
Win	3–0	Rob Wynne	Submission (armbar)	UGC 14: No Pain, No Gain	September 21, 2006	2	4:54	Montreal, Quebec, Canada	
Win	2–0	Daniel Grandmaison	Submission (armbar)	ECC 3: East Coast Warriors	July 22, 2006	1	1:46	Halifax, Nova Scotia, Canada	
Win	1–0	Craig Skinner	Submission (armbar)	Extreme Cage Combat 1	April 29, 2006	1	N/A	Halifax, Nova Scotia, Canada	

== See also ==
- List of current UFC fighters
- List of male mixed martial artists
- List of Canadian UFC fighters
