= UFC 148 =

UFC mixed martial arts event in 2012

UFC 148: Silva vs. Sonnen II
- The poster for UFC 148: Silva vs. Sonnen II
- Promotion: Ultimate Fighting Championship
- Date: July 7, 2012
- Venue: MGM Grand Garden Arena
- City: Las Vegas, Nevada
- Attendance: 15,104
- Total gate: $6,901,655
- Buyrate: 925,000
- Total purse: $1,438,000

Event chronology
| UFC 147: Silva vs. Franklin II | UFC 148: Silva vs. Sonnen II | UFC on Fuel TV: Muñoz vs. Weidman |

UFC 148: Silva vs. Sonnen II was a mixed martial arts event held by the Ultimate Fighting Championship on July 7, 2012, at the MGM Grand Garden Arena in Las Vegas, Nevada. It was the seventeenth UFC event of the year. The card consisted of eleven bouts, with six televised live on pay-per-view, four preliminary bouts on FX, and one on Facebook.

The card's main event featured UFC Middleweight Champion Anderson Silva defending his title against Chael Sonnen in a highly anticipated bout. The contest was heavily promoted, featuring the International Fight Week, as well as the preview show UFC Primetime. Tito Ortiz was inducted into the UFC Hall of Fame during the UFC Fan Expo in conjunction with the event, and fought fellow former UFC Light Heavyweight Champion Forrest Griffin in the co-main event of the evening.

== Background ==
=== Card changes ===
Urijah Faber was expected to challenge Dominick Cruz for the UFC Bantamweight Championship in the co-main event (after their stint as opposing coaches on The Ultimate Fighter: Live), but a torn ACL forced Cruz off the card. Faber was then expected to face replacement Renan Barão for the Interim UFC Bantamweight Championship, but that fight was moved to the main event of UFC 149 in Calgary, Alberta. Barão was originally scheduled to fight Ivan Menjivar on the UFC 148 preliminary card, and Mike Easton replaced Barão in the opening bout of the main card.

Rich Franklin was expected to return to the middleweight ranks in a bout against Cung Le. However, due to an injury sustained by UFC 147 headliner Vitor Belfort, Franklin was pulled from the bout with Le to replace Belfort in a rematch against Wanderlei Silva.

=== International Fight Week ===
In conjunction with the Las Vegas Convention and Visitors Authority, the UFC planned five days of festivities (known as International Fight Week) leading up to UFC 148. International Fight Week is expected to be an annual July occurrence, coinciding with a Las Vegas UFC event. UFC President Dana White stated, "The first annual International Fight Week will be awesome, the fans are going to have a fight week experience better than anything they've ever had before, and each year we are going to build this thing to the point where every fan on the planet knows they have to come to Vegas for this July fight week at least once in their lives." The UFC Fan Expo (two days of fighter meet-and-greets, training seminars, a Grapplers Quest tournament, autograph sessions and other events) also occurred on July 6 and 7.

=== Weigh-in ===
I've got to give him [Sonnen] a lot of credit. He basically said to me that he wasn't looking for any kind of serious discipline against Anderson, that he'd forgiven him. He wasn't even sure if it was premeditated by Anderson. He was very gracious, very forgiving.

— Keith Kizer, NSAC executive director.

Regarded as the most notable weigh-in event in the history of combat sports, it was held at the Mandalay Bay Events Center in Las Vegas. All fighters on the card made their required weight. Silva threw a shoulder at Chael Sonnen. The move (which connected with Sonnen's face) led to a tense moment, when the two had to be separated by UFC president Dana White. It was later reported by the Nevada State Athletic Commission that Silva would not be sanctioned for his actions.

== Event ==
The event consisted of 11 mixed-martial-arts bouts sanctioned by the Nevada State Athletic Commission and contested under the Unified Rules of Mixed Martial Arts. All bouts consisted of three five-minute rounds, except for the main-event championship match between Silva and Sonnen (which was scheduled for five five-minute rounds). Six bouts were televised live on pay-per-view. Four preliminary bouts were televised live on FX, and one was streamed live on Facebook. UFC 148 set a mixed-martial-arts gate record in Nevada. The event earned $6,901,655 in ticket sales, beating the previous record set at UFC 66. Attendance was 15,104. It sold an estimated 925,000 pay-per-view buys, the most in 2012 for any UFC event.

=== Preliminary card ===
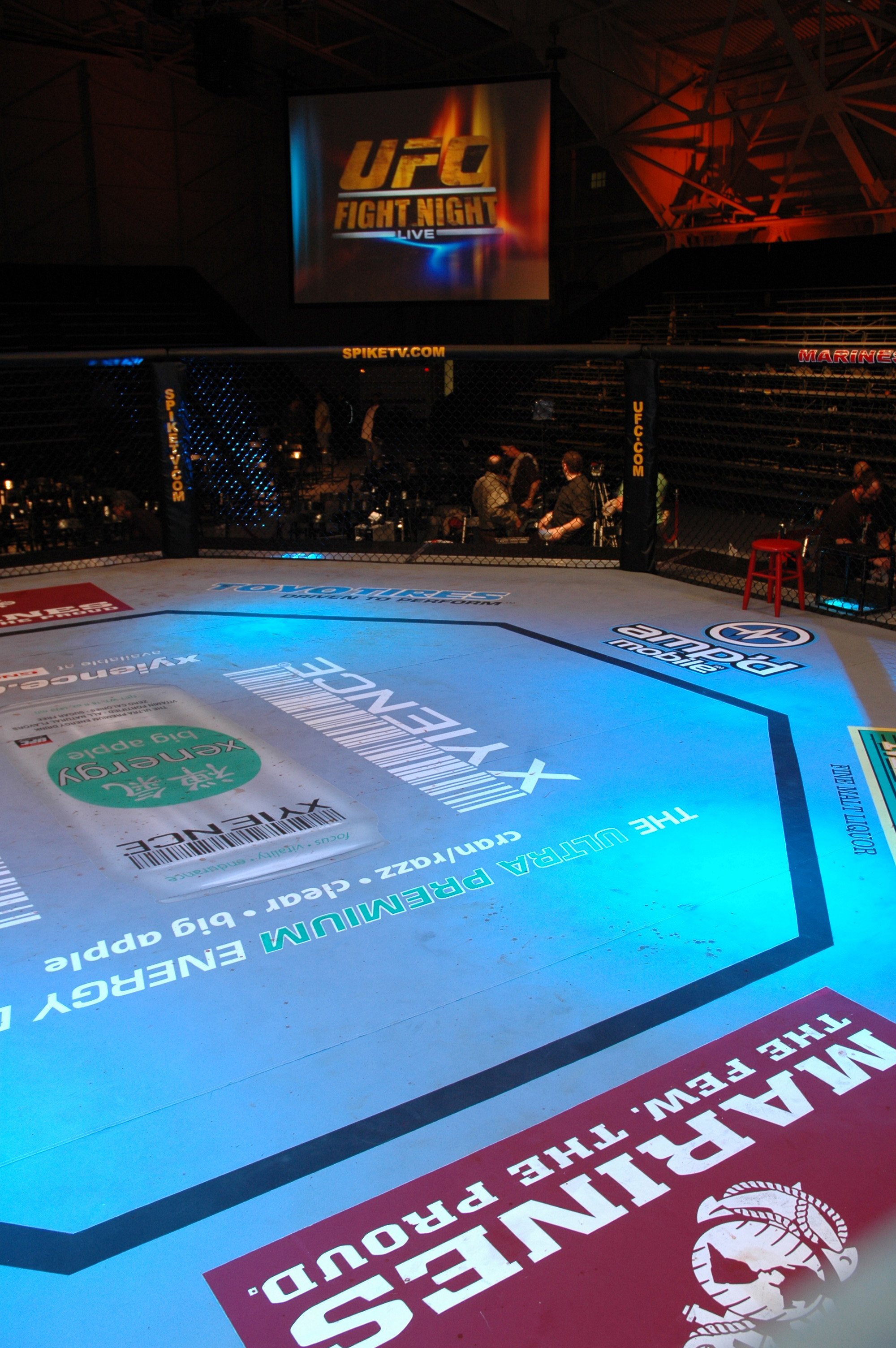
All fights took place inside a cage, the UFC's Octagon.

The event's five preliminary fights all went the full three rounds, ending in decisions. In the first bout of the evening, Rafaello Oliveira outpointed Yoislandy Izquierdo to win 29–28 in all three judges' scorecards. After taking down Izquierdo early in the first round, Oliveira was hit by a strong knee in the following stanza, but put his opponent in the ground again. The final round saw both fighters grappling, with Oliveira reigning victorious.

In the second bout, Shane Roller rebounded from three losses in a row with a unanimous decision victory over John Alessio. Roller, a former four-time Oklahoma high school state wrestling champion and a Big 12 Conference Champion at Oklahoma State University, was able to take Alessio down and control his opponent's back on the ground, but was hurt on the feet in the first and third rounds. The three judges scored the fight 29–28 in favor of Roller.

The other middleweight bout of the night saw Costas Philippou defeating Riki Fukuda by unanimous decision. Philippou successfully defended all of Fukuda's takedown attempts and landed the more solid strikes. The judges saw it 30–27, 30–27 and 29–28 for Philippou.

Khabib Nurmagomedov defeated Gleison Tibau by unanimous decision in their lightweight contest. In an uneventful bout, which saw only one successful takedown scored by Tibau despite a combined 19 attempts, Nurmagomedov won 30–27, 30–27 and 30–27 on all three of the judges scorecards. The most memorable part of this bout was the controversy surrounding the judges' decision.

In the preliminary card's final match, Melvin Guillard faced Brazilian Jiu-Jitsu black belt Fabrício Camões. Despite being mounted in the first round by Camoes, Guillard picked apart his opponent in the rest of the fight by exercising good takedown defense and outstriking Camoes. The judges awarded the Imperial Athletics representative the unanimous decision (30–27, 30–27, 30–27).

=== Main card ===
The first bout on the pay-per-view portion of the event saw Mike Easton taking on Ivan Menjivar in a bantamweight contest. The entire fight remained on the feet, with both fighters throwing 317 combined strikes. All three judges scored the bout in favor of Easton, with two scoring it 30–27 while one judge seeing it 29–28 giving Easton the unanimous decision victory.

The second bout saw former title contender Chad Mendes fighting The Ultimate Fighter: Team GSP vs. Team Koscheck contestant Cody McKenzie. Early in the first round, Mendes caught his opponent with a straight right hand to the midsection. McKenzie collapsed to his knees and Mendes attacked him with ground-and-pound, forcing the referee to stop the contest at thirty-one seconds. It was the first knockout victory for Mendes since 2009.

In his first fight as a welterweight, former UFC Middleweight title challenger Demian Maia faced Judo black belt Dong Hyun Kim. The bout was stopped in forty-seven seconds by referee Mario Yamasaki, after Maia took Kim down and finished him with strikes from the mounted position. UFC commentator Joe Rogan said that Kim had broken a rib, but it was later revealed that he suffered a major muscle spasm.

The fourth fight featured the former Strikeforce Middleweight Champion Cung Le meeting veteran Patrick Côté at middleweight. This was Le's second fight in the promotion, after losing his first to Wanderlei Silva by TKO at UFC 139. Côté was returning to the UFC after last losing a decision to Tom Lawlor at UFC 121 in October 2010. He was on a four-fight winning streak, undefeated since leaving the organization. Le won a hard-fought unanimous decision by exercising great footwork, trips and takedowns and effective striking.

Hours before the long-awaited rubber match and co-main event of the evening between former UFC Light Heavyweight Champions Tito Ortiz and Forrest Griffin, Ortiz was inducted into the UFC Hall of Fame. The history of the two fighters started when Ortiz won their first bout at UFC 59, and Griffin won the rematch at UFC 106; both fights ended in a split decision. As in the first two fights, Ortiz came out strong, but Griffin countered his attacks and ultimately won via unanimous decision.

==== Silva vs. Sonnen ====
The sixth and final bout of the main card was the UFC Middleweight Championship match between Anderson SIlva and Chael Sonnen, regulated by referee Yves Lavigne. The fight was a rematch of the main event at UFC 117, also a contest for the UFC Middleweight Championship. In that match, Silva (after losing four rounds on points) made Sonnen submit to a triangle choke with 1:50 left in the fight. Sonnen landed 320 strikes against Silva, more than any other fighter since UFC 5 (when Royce Gracie landed 355 strikes against Ken Shamrock). Silva had only absorbed 166 strikes (combined) in his previous 11 matches. With the win Silva retained the UFC Middleweight Championship, his undefeated record in the UFC and extended his winning streak to 13. The bout received the Fight of the Year award at the 2010 World MMA Awards. After UFC 117 Silva defended the title twice, with KO and TKO wins over Vitor Belfort and Yushin Okami respectively. Sonnen is also undefeated since UFC 117, defeating Brian Stann and Michael Bisping and setting the stage for the most-anticipated rematch of the year.

The UFC Middleweight Championship main-event match between Silva and Sonnen was originally scheduled for UFC 147 at Havelange Stadium in Rio de Janeiro, Brazil. Due to a scheduling conflict with the United Nations Conference on Sustainable Development, the bout was moved to headline UFC 148 at the MGM Grand Garden Arena in Las Vegas, Nevada. At this point in their careers Sonnen was ranked as the number-two middleweight in the world by Sherdog, while Silva is ranked number-one middleweight and the number-one pound-for-pound fighter in the world according to Sherdog, Yahoo! Sports, and ESPN. In an effort to further promote the contest, UFC Primetime returned on Fuel TV.

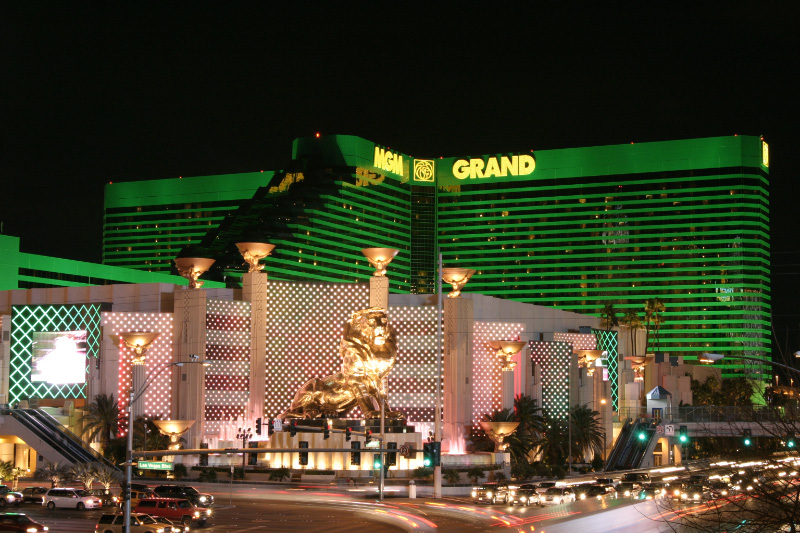
UFC 148 took place at the MGM Grand Garden Arena.

After Sonnen's win over Nate Marquardt in early 2010, Sonnen became a polarizing figure due to his criticism of Silva and overall trash talk (including comments directed towards Silva's manager, teammates, coaches, wife and home country of Brazil). Silva remained relatively quiet until a UFC 148 media call in June 2012, when he stated through an interpreter: "Chael Sonnen's going to get his ass kicked like he's never gotten his ass kicked before. What I'm going to do inside the Octagon is something that's going to change the image of the sport. This is going to be violent and I am sorry. I'm going to make sure that every one of his teeth are broken, that his arms are broken and his legs are broken. He's not going to be able to walk out of the Octagon by himself. I can guarantee that. He will need a plastic surgeon afterwards. And I know that he's listening, so the game's over. No more shit talking. It's on now." This caught some by surprise, who perceived his remarks as out of character.

As the fight finally took place, Sonnen quickly took the champion down in the first round and maintained a dominant position throughout, eventually gaining full mount while attacking with ground-and-pound. One cageside judge scored it a 10–8 round as Silva was credited with zero strikes. Sonnen connected with 76 strikes from the top position in the opening round, and held a 22-to-15 edge in significant strikes against Silva. However, Sonnen was unable to inflict substantial damage to the champion, and as the fight resumed Silva was repeatedly admonished by the ref for holding Chael's shorts. Being unable to score a takedown due to Silva's takedown defense, Sonnen failed to connect with a high-risk spinning backfist strike, leaving Sonnen in a scooting position for Silva to land a knee to the chest, then with punches to stop Sonnen with a TKO at 1:55 of the second round.

== Results ==
Main Card
| Weight class | | | | Method | Round | Time | Notes |
|---|---|---|---|---|---|---|---|
| Middleweight | Anderson Silva (c) | def. | Chael Sonnen | TKO (knee to the body and punches) | 2 | 1:55 | (Note: For the UFC Middleweight Championship) |
| Light Heavyweight | Forrest Griffin | def. | Tito Ortiz | Decision (unanimous) (29–28, 29–28, 29–28) | 3 | 5:00 |
| Middleweight | Cung Le | def. | Patrick Côté | Decision (unanimous) (30–27, 30–27, 30–27) | 3 | 5:00 |
| Welterweight | Demian Maia | def. | Dong Hyun Kim | TKO (rib injury) | 1 | 0:47 |
| Featherweight | Chad Mendes | def. | Cody McKenzie | KO (punch) | 1 | 0:31 |
| Bantamweight | Mike Easton | def. | Ivan Menjivar | Decision (unanimous) (30–27, 29–28, 30–27) | 3 | 5:00 |
Preliminary Card (FX)
| Lightweight | Melvin Guillard | def. | Fabrício Camões | Decision (unanimous) (30–27, 30–27, 30–27) | 3 | 5:00 | (Note: This bout aired on the broadcast following the Nurmagomedov vs Tibau bout.) |
| Lightweight | Khabib Nurmagomedov | def. | Gleison Tibau | Decision (unanimous) (30–27, 30–27, 30–27) | 3 | 5:00 | (Note: This bout aired on the broadcast following the Silva vs Sonnen bout.) |
| Middleweight | Costas Philippou | def. | Riki Fukuda | Decision (unanimous) (30–27, 30–27, 29–28) | 3 | 5:00 | (Note: This bout aired on the broadcast following the Guillard vs Camões bout.) |
| Lightweight | Shane Roller | def. | John Alessio | Decision (unanimous) (29–28, 29–28, 29–28) | 3 | 5:00 |
Preliminary Card (Facebook)
| Lightweight | Rafaello Oliveira | def. | Yoislandy Izquierdo | Decision (unanimous) (29–28, 29–28, 29–28) | 3 | 5:00 |

== Bonus awards ==
The following fighters received $75,000 bonuses:

- Fight of the Night: Forrest Griffin vs. Tito Ortiz
- Knockout of the Night: Anderson Silva
- Submission of the Night: Not awarded as no matches ended in submission

== Reported payout ==
The following are the reported payouts to the fighters, as reported to the Nevada State Athletic Commission. The amounts are figures which the UFC disclosed to the state athletic commission; fight bonuses, sponsorship fees and other unofficial bonuses were not disclosed.

- Anderson Silva ($200,000—no win bonus) defeated Chael Sonnen ($50,000)
- Forrest Griffin ($275,000—includes $150,000 win bonus) defeated Tito Ortiz ($250,000)
- Cung Le ($150,000—no win bonus) defeated Patrick Cote ($21,000)
- Demian Maia ($96,000—includes $48,000 win bonus) defeated Dong Hyun Kim ($44,000)
- Chad Mendes ($36,000—includes $18,000 win bonus) defeated Cody McKenzie ($10,000)
- Mike Easton ($20,000—includes $10,000 win bonus) defeated Ivan Menjivar ($13,000)
- Melvin Guillard ($72,000—includes $36,000 win bonus) defeated Fabricio Camoes ($8,000)
- Khabib Nurmagomedov ($20,000—includes $10,000 win bonus) defeated Gleison Tibau ($31,000)
- Costas Philippou ($32,000—includes $16,000 win bonus) defeated Riki Fukuda ($28,000)
- Shane Roller ($46,000—includes $23,000 win bonus) defeated John Alessio ($10,000)
- Rafaello Oliveira ($20,000—includes $10,000 win bonus) defeated Yoislandy Izquierdo ($6,000)

== See also ==
- List of UFC events
- 2012 in UFC
