= Rafaello Oliveira =

Brazilian martial artist (born 1982)

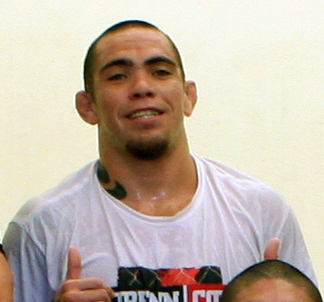
- Oliveira in 2009
- Born: Rafaello Oliveira Ferreira; January 26, 1982 (age 44); Recife, Brazil
- Other names: Tractor
- Height: 5 ft 8 in (1.73 m)
- Weight: 155 lb (70 kg; 11.1 st)
- Division: Lightweight
- Reach: 71.5 in (182 cm)
- Stance: Orthodox
- Fighting out of: Charleston, South Carolina, U.S.
- Team: Houzn Jiu Jitsu AMA Fight Club
- Rank: 4th degree black belt in Brazilian Jiu-Jitsu
- Years active: 2004–present

Mixed martial arts record
- Total: 25
- Wins: 17
- By knockout: 4
- By submission: 5
- By decision: 6
- Unknown: 2
- Losses: 8
- By knockout: 4
- By submission: 2
- By decision: 2

Other information
- Mixed martial arts record from Sherdog

Rafaello Oliveira Ferreira (Brazilian Portuguese pronunciation: [ʁafaˈɛlu oliˈvejɾɐ]; born January 26, 1982) is a Brazilian mixed martial artist who formerly competed in the lightweight division of the Ultimate Fighting Championship.

== Mixed martial arts career ==
Oliveria took up Brazilian Jiu-Jitsu at the age of 16, and started his professional MMA career in 2004, competing in his native Brazil. He moved to the United States in 2007, and settled in Knoxville, Tennessee, in 2008, where he was an instructor at the Knoxville Martial Arts Academy. In 2012 he moved to Charleston, SC where he taught at Charleston Krav Maga and now teaches at his own location in Mt. Pleasant, SC called Houzn Jiu Jitsu Academy.

=== Ultimate Fighting Championship ===
In August 2009, it was announced Oliveira would be debuting for the Ultimate Fighting Championship at UFC 103. He was originally scheduled to fight Dan Lauzon, but Lauzon pulled out of the bout due to an injury and was replaced by Nik Lentz. Despite pushing the pace in the first round and moving forward aggressively, Oliveira was controlled by Lentz in the 2nd and 3rd rounds which led to a unanimous decision loss.

Oliveira was expected to face Sean Sherk on January 2, 2010, at UFC 108. However, after an injury to Tyson Griffin, Sherk stepped up to face Jim Miller, leaving Oliveira to face John Gunderson. Oliveira went on to defeat Gunderson via unanimous decision, earning his first UFC win.

Oliveria most recently faced Andre Winner on March 31, 2010, at UFC Fight Night 21, replacing an injured Cole Miller. Oliveira was defeated by Winner via unanimous decision and was subsequently released from the UFC.

In May 2011, Oliveira was re-signed by the UFC and faced Gleison Tibau on May 28, 2011, at UFC 130, replacing an injured Bart Palaszewski. Oliveira was submitted for the second time in his professional career, tapping out to a rear-naked choke in the second round.

Oliveira faced Yves Edwards on October 1, 2011, at UFC on Versus 6. He lost the fight via TKO in the second round.

Oliveira was expected to face Reza Madadi on January 20, 2012, at UFC on FX 1. However, Oliveira was forced out of a bout with an injury and replaced by returning veteran Fabrício Camões.

Oliveira faced Yoislandy Izquierdo on July 7, 2012, at UFC 148. He won the fight via unanimous decision.

Oliveira was expected to face Michael Chiesa on December 8, 2012, at UFC on Fox 5. However, Oliveira was forced out of the bout with a broken hand and replaced by Marcus LeVesseur.

Oliveira faced Edson Barboza at UFC 162, and lost the bout due to leg kicks in the second round.

Oliveira faced Erik Koch on February 22, 2014, at UFC 170. He lost the fight by TKO in the first round after he was knocked down by a counter straight right hook, and was subsequently released from UFC shortly after.

== Personal life ==
Oliveira is married to Wanessa Carolina and has three children.

== Mixed martial arts record ==
Professional record breakdown
25 matches	17 wins	8 losses
By knockout	4	4
By submission	5	2
By decision	6	2
Unknown	2	0

Res.	Record	Opponent	Method	Event	Date	Round	Time	Location	Notes
Loss	17–8	Erik Koch	TKO (punches)	UFC 170	February 22, 2014	1	1:24	Las Vegas, Nevada, United States	
Loss	17–7	Edson Barboza	TKO (leg kicks)	UFC 162	July 6, 2013	2	1:44	Las Vegas, Nevada, United States	
Win	17–6	Yoislandy Izquierdo	Decision (unanimous)	UFC 148	July 7, 2012	3	5:00	Las Vegas, Nevada, United States	
Loss	16–6	Yves Edwards	TKO (head kick and punches)	UFC Live: Cruz vs. Johnson	October 1, 2011	2	2:44	Washington, D.C., United States	
Loss	16–5	Gleison Tibau	Submission (rear-naked choke)	UFC 130	May 28, 2011	2	3:28	Las Vegas, Nevada, United States	
Win	16–4	Ryan Bixler	TKO (punches)	Recife Fighting Championship 4	March 31, 2011	2	0:21	Recife, Brazil	
Win	15–4	Bendy Casimir	Decision (unanimous)	Recife Fighting Championship 3	December 2, 2010	3	5:00	Recife, Brazil	
Win	14–4	Kevin Roddy	Submission (rear-naked choke)	DFL 1: The Big Bang	November 24, 2010	1	4:46	New Jersey, United States, United States	
Win	13–4	Rafael Dias	Decision (unanimous)	Scorpius Fighting Championships 1	October 24, 2010	3	5:00	Fort Lauderdale, Florida, United States	
Loss	12–4	Andre Winner	Decision (unanimous)	UFC Fight Night: Florian vs. Gomi	March 31, 2010	3	5:00	Charlotte, North Carolina, United States	
Win	12–3	John Gunderson	Decision (unanimous)	UFC 108	January 2, 2010	3	5:00	Las Vegas, Nevada, United States	
Loss	11–3	Nik Lentz	Decision (unanimous)	UFC 103	September 19, 2009	3	5:00	Dallas, Texas, United States	
Win	11–2	John Mahlow	Decision (unanimous)	XFC 8: Regional Conflict	April 25, 2009	3	5:00	Knoxville, Tennessee, United States	
Win	10–2	Beau King	Submission (rear-naked choke)	Colosseo Championship Fighting	March 6, 2009	1	1:34	Edmonton, Alberta, Canada	
Win	9–2	Robert Thompson	Submission (triangle choke)	XFC 7: School of Hard Knox	February 20, 2009	1	4:50	Knoxville, Tennessee, United States	
Loss	8–2	Lyle Beerbohm	TKO (doctor stoppage)	ShoXC 9	October 10, 2008	1	5:00	Hammond, Indiana, United States	
Win	8–1	David Santiago	N/A	ROTR: Beatdown 6	February 16, 2008	N/A	N/A	Hawaii, United States	
Win	7–1	Edilson Florencio	Submission (triangle choke)	MZI - Combat 2	November 24, 2007	N/A	N/A	Caicó, Rio Grande do Norte, Brazil	
Win	6–1	Vitor Pimenta	TKO (punches)	Action Fight Championship	June 20, 2007	2	N/A	Pernambuco, Brazil	
Win	5–1	Weguimar de Lucena Xavier	TKO (slam)	Rino's FC 2	June 8, 2006	1	N/A	Pernambuco, Brazil	
Win	4–1	Fabio Santana Toldo	Submission (rear-naked choke)	Rino's FC 1	February 9, 2006	1	N/A	Pernambuco, Brazil	
Win	3–1	Miro Arona	Decision (unanimous)	Pernambuco Extreme Fight	September 16, 2005	2	5:00	Pernambuco, Brazil	
Loss	2–1	Jorge Rodrigues Silva	Submission (keylock)	Pernambuco Extreme Fight	September 16, 2005	1	N/A	Pernambuco, Brazil	
Win	2–0	Unknown Fighter	N/A	Pernambuco Extreme Fight	June 16, 2005	N/A	N/A	Pernambuco, Brazil	
Win	1–0	Weguimar de Lucena Xavier	TKO (punches)	Arena Fight	December 9, 2004	2	N/A	Pernambuco, Brazil	
