= Ken Stone (fighter) =

American mixed martial arts fighter

- Born: Kenneth Alan Stone; October 8, 1982 (age 44); Holliston, Massachusetts, United States
- Height: 5 ft 8 in (1.73 m)
- Weight: 135 lb (61 kg; 9.6 st)
- Division: Bantamweight; Featherweight
- Reach: 71.0 in (180 cm)
- Fighting out of: Coconut Creek, Florida, United States
- Team: American Top Team
- Years active: 2007–present

Mixed martial arts record
- Total: 15
- Wins: 11
- By knockout: 4
- By submission: 6
- By decision: 1
- Losses: 4
- By knockout: 3
- By decision: 1

Amateur record
- Total: 1
- Wins: 1
- By submission: 1
- Losses: 0

Other information
- University: Bridgewater State University
- Mixed martial arts record from Sherdog

Kenneth Alan Stone (born October 8, 1982) is an American mixed martial artist. A professional MMA competitor since 2007, Stone had fought mostly in regional promotions on the east coast, before signing with Zuffa.

== Career ==
=== Background ===
Stone wrestled collegiately at Bridgewater State University from 2001-2004. He began training in mixed martial arts in 2006 and turned professional the following year. He was an assistant coach for Holliston High Wrestling team from 2005-2007.

=== Amateur career ===
Six years before turning professional, Stone debuted in amateur MMA on August 24, 2001, facing Jeff Malki at Extreme Grappling Challenge 4. He won via submission, and would then take a long hiatus before making his professional debut in 2007.

=== Early career ===
Stone started his professional mixed martial arts career on the regional circuit winning his first eight professional bouts, finishing all of his opponents, before dropping a five-round split decision loss to Jason McLean, during which he suffered a broken foot in the second round. After fighting McLean, Ken made a decision to move down from featherweight to bantamweight weight class division.

=== World Extreme Cagefighting ===
In October 2010 Stone signed with World Extreme Cagefighting.

Stone made his promotional debut against Eddie Wineland on November 11, 2010 at WEC 53, losing via KO (slam) in the first round.

=== Ultimate Fighting Championship ===
In October 2010, World Extreme Cagefighting merged with the Ultimate Fighting Championship. As part of the merger, all WEC fighters were transferred to the UFC.

Stone faced Scott Jorgensen on June 4, 2011 at The Ultimate Fighter 13 Finale. Stone was arguably winning the first round until he was knocked unconscious from his guard.

Stone fought Donny Walker on September 17, 2011 at UFC Fight Night 25. He won the fight via technical submission (rear naked choke) in the first round, earning his first UFC victory.

Stone was expected to face Mike Easton on January 20, 2012 at UFC on FX 1, but pulled out due to an injury.

Stone was expected to face Edwin Figueroa on June 22, 2012 at UFC on FX 4. However, Figueroa was forced out of the bout with an injury and replaced by Francisco Rivera. However, Rivera pulled out of the bout due to an injury and was replaced by Dustin Pague. Stone defeated Pague via split decision.

Stone next faced Erik Pérez on August 11, 2012 at UFC 150. He lost the fight via TKO in the first round, and was subsequently released from the promotion shortly after.

== Championships and accomplishments ==
- American Fighting Organization
  - AFO Featherweight Championship (One time)

== Mixed martial arts record ==
Professional record breakdown
15 matches	11 wins	4 losses
By knockout	4	3
By submission	6	0
By decision	1	1

Res.	Record	Opponent	Method	Event	Date	Round	Time	Location	Notes
Loss	11–4	Erik Pérez	KO (punches)	UFC 150	August 11, 2012	1	0:17	Denver, Colorado, United States	
Win	11–3	Dustin Pague	Decision (split)	UFC on FX: Maynard vs. Guida	June 22, 2012	3	5:00	Atlantic City, New Jersey, United States	
Win	10–3	Donny Walker	Technical Submission (rear-naked choke)	UFC Fight Night: Shields vs. Ellenberger	September 17, 2011	1	2:40	New Orleans, Louisiana, United States	
Loss	9–3	Scott Jorgensen	KO (punches)	The Ultimate Fighter 13 Finale	June 4, 2011	1	4:01	Las Vegas, Nevada, United States	
Loss	9–2	Eddie Wineland	KO (slam)	WEC 53	December 16, 2010	1	2:11	Glendale, Arizona, United States	
Win	9–1	Jason Bennett	Submission (guillotine choke)	AFO: Halloween Havoc 2	October 8, 2010	1	2:37	Mansfield, Massachusetts, United States	
Loss	8–1	Jason McLean	Decision (split)	AFO: Summer Bash	June 5, 2009	5	5:00	Braintree, Massachusetts, United States	Lost the AFO Featherweight Championship.
Win	8–0	Eddie Felix	Submission (rear-naked choke)	AFO: Night of Champions	April 11, 2009	1	1:54	Braintree, Massachusetts, United States	Won the AFO Featherweight Championship.
Win	7–0	Nam Nguyen	TKO (punches)	AFO: New Year's Redemption	January 3, 2009	1	3:30	Braintree, Massachusetts, United States	
Win	6–0	Chris Simmons	Submission (guillotine choke)	United States Fight League: War in the Woods 4	September 13, 2008	2	1:30	Ledyard, Connecticut, United States	
Win	5–0	Ethan Kean	TKO (punches)	World Championship Fighting 3	June 20, 2008	1	0:33	Wilmington, Massachusetts, United States	
Win	4–0	Joe Camacho	TKO (punches)	Battle Cage Xtreme 4	April 19, 2008	1	2:51	Atlantic City, New Jersey, United States	
Win	3–0	Daniel Duarte	Submission (rear-naked choke)	World Championship Fighting 2	February 8, 2008	1	1:46	Wilmington, Massachusetts, United States	
Win	2–0	Ben Manseau	Submission (guillotine choke)	CZ 24: Renaissance	October 13, 2007	1	0:30	Revere, Massachusetts, United States	
Win	1–0	Josh Spearman	TKO (punches)	WFL 18: Calloway Cup 6	August 4, 2007	1	1:54	Revere, Massachusetts, United States	

== Amateur mixed martial arts record ==
Professional record breakdown
1 match	1 win	0 losses
By knockout	0	0
By submission	1	0
By decision	0	0

Res.	Record	Opponent	Method	Event	Date	Round	Time	Location	Notes
Win	1–0	Jeff Malki	Submission	EGC - Extreme Grappling Challenge 4	August 24, 2001	1	2:30	Revere, Massachusetts, United States	
