= Robbie Peralta =

American mixed martial arts fighter

- Born: Roberto Andres Peralta; March 14, 1986 (age 40); Escondido, California, United States
- Other names: Problems
- Nationality: American
- Height: 5 ft 7 in (1.70 m)
- Weight: 155 lb (70 kg; 11 st 1 lb)
- Division: Lightweight; Featherweight; Bantamweight; Flyweight
- Reach: 69 in (175 cm)
- Stance: Orthodox
- Fighting out of: Escondido, California, United States
- Team: Team Xplode MMA; North County MMA
- Rank: Black belt in Taekwondo; Blue belt in Brazilian Jiu-Jitsu
- Years active: 2006–present

Mixed martial arts record
- Total: 29
- Wins: 19
- By knockout: 13
- By submission: 2
- By decision: 4
- Losses: 9
- By knockout: 2
- By submission: 4
- By decision: 3
- No contests: 1

Other information
- Mixed martial arts record from Sherdog

Roberto "Robbie" Andres Peralta (born March 14, 1986) is an American mixed martial artist who most recently competed in the Featherweight division. A professional competitor since 2006, he has competed for the UFC, the World Series of Fighting, Strikeforce, and Bellator.

== Background ==
Peralta grew up in Escondido, California, and trained taekwondo from the age of five to twelve.

== Mixed martial arts career ==
=== Early career ===
Peralta made his professional MMA debut in March 2007. He lost his debut by submission, but quickly amassed a record of 13 wins and 3 losses over the next few years. A majority of his fights have been in the California-based independent promotion Gladiator Challenge.

=== Strikeforce ===
In April 2011, Peralta made his Strikeforce debut by upsetting current DREAM featherweight champion Hiroyuki Takaya at Strikeforce: Diaz vs. Daley via split decision.

=== Ultimate Fighting Championship ===
In early September 2011, Peralta signed with the UFC to replace Mackens Semerzier against Mike Lullo at UFC Fight Night: Shields vs. Ellenberger. He won the fight via unanimous decision.

Peralta defeated Mackens Semerzier on November 12, 2011, at UFC on Fox 1. It was officially recorded as a TKO victory for Peralta though replays later showed that an accidental headbutt dropped Semerzier and allowed Peralta to flurry and earn the stoppage. The fight was later ruled a no contest by the California State Athletic Commission.

Peralta was linked to a bout with Charles Oliveira on January 20, 2012, at UFC on FX 1. However, UFC officials scrapped the bout.

A rematch with Semerzier was expected to take place on March 3, 2012, at UFC on FX 2. However, Peralta was forced out of the bout with a toe injury and replaced by Daniel Pineda.

Peralta fought Jason Young on September 29, 2012, at UFC on Fuel TV 5. Peralta won the fight via KO 23 seconds into the first round.

A bout with Akira Corassani, previously linked to UFC 156, was moved April 6, 2013, at UFC on Fuel TV 9, after an illness sidelined Corassani for a time. Peralta lost to Corassani via decision after three rounds. Peralta was suspended for six months after the fight for failing the post fight drug test and testing positive for marijuana.

Peralta faced Estevan Payan on December 28, 2013, at UFC 168. After a back-and-forth first two rounds, Peralta won via knockout early into the third round.

Peralta faced Rony Jason on May 31, 2014, at The Ultimate Fighter Brazil 3 Finale. He won the back-and-forth fight via split decision.

Peralta faced Thiago Tavares on August 16, 2014, at UFC Fight Night 47. He lost the fight via submission in the first round.

Peralta faced Clay Guida on April 4, 2015, at UFC Fight Night 63. He lost the fight by unanimous decision and was subsequently released from the promotion.

=== Post-UFC career ===
After being released from the UFC, Peralta signed with World Series of Fighting and made his promotional debut at WSOF 26 on December 18, 2015. He lost the bout via second-round technical knockout.

He then faced Alan Omer at Brave CF 4 on March 31, 2017. He lost the bout via third-round submission.

Peralta then headlined California Cage Wars 1 event against Shad Smith on September 3, 2017. He won the bout via unanimous decision.

Peralta was scheduled to face Aaron Wetherspoon at KOTC: Under Siege on May 4, 2018. However, the bout was cancelled due to an unknown reason.

He then signed with Bellator MMA and faced Juan Archuleta at Bellator 201 on June 29, 2018. He lost the fight via third-round knockout.

== Bare-knuckle boxing ==
After his sole bout in Bellator, Peralta took a bare-knuckle bout at a WBKFF event against Jay Cucciniello on November 9, 2018. He won the bout via unanimous decision.

He then signed with BKFC and made his promotional debut against Peter Petties at BKFC Fight Night 4 on December 9, 2021. He won the bout via unanimous decision.

On June 11, 2022, he fought Martin Brown at BKFC Fight Night 9 and won by split decision.

On February 2, 2024, Peralta faced Bryce Henry at BKFC 57 and experienced his first bare-knuckle boxing loss.

Peralta faced JorDan Christensen on January 18, 2025 at BKFC Fight Night 19. He won the fight by unanimous decision.

Peralta faced Bryan Duran on July 12, 2025 at BKFC 78. The bout ended in a majority draw with a judge's 48-47 score going to Peralta.

== Personal life ==
Peralta has three daughters.

== Championships and accomplishments ==
- Gladiator Challenge
  - Gladiator Challenge Flyweight Championship (one time; former)
    - One successful title defense
  - Gladiator Challenge Featherweight Championship (one time; former)
    - One successful title defense

== Mixed martial arts record ==
Professional record breakdown
29 matches	19 wins	9 losses
By knockout	13	2
By submission	2	4
By decision	4	3
No contests	1	

Res.	Record	Opponent	Method	Event	Date	Round	Time	Location	Notes
Loss	19–9 (1)	Juan Archuleta	KO (punches)	Bellator 201	June 29, 2018	3	0:14	Temecula, California, United States	
Win	19–8 (1)	Shad Smith	Decision (unanimous)	CCW 1: Peralta vs. Smith	September 3, 2017	3	5:00	Valley Center, California, United States	
Loss	18–8 (1)	Alan Omer	Submission (rear naked-choke)	Brave 4: Unstoppable	March 31, 2017	3	4:44	Abu Dhabi, United Arab Emirates	Lightweight bout.
Loss	18–7 (1)	Sheymon Moraes	TKO (punches)	WSOF 26	December 18, 2015	2	3:21	Las Vegas, Nevada, United States	
Loss	18–6 (1)	Clay Guida	Decision (unanimous)	UFC Fight Night: Mendes vs. Lamas	April 4, 2015	3	5:00	Fairfax, Virginia, United States	
Loss	18–5 (1)	Thiago Tavares	Submission (rear-naked choke)	UFC Fight Night: Bader vs. St. Preux	August 16, 2014	1	4:27	Bangor, Maine, United States	
Win	18–4 (1)	Rony Jason	Decision (split)	The Ultimate Fighter Brazil 3 Finale: Miocic vs. Maldonado	May 31, 2014	3	5:00	São Paulo, Brazil	
Win	17–4 (1)	Estevan Payan	KO (punches)	UFC 168	December 28, 2013	3	0:12	Las Vegas, Nevada, United States	
Loss	16–4 (1)	Akira Corassani	Decision (unanimous)	UFC on Fuel TV: Mousasi vs. Latifi	April 6, 2013	3	5:00	Stockholm, Sweden	Peralta tested positive for marijuana after the bout.
Win	16–3 (1)	Jason Young	KO (punches)	UFC on Fuel TV: Struve vs. Miocic	September 29, 2012	1	0:23	Nottingham, England	
NC	15–3 (1)	Mackens Semerzier	NC (accidental headbutt)	UFC on Fox: Velasquez vs. Dos Santos	November 12, 2011	3	1:54	Anaheim, California, United States	Overturned; originally won by TKO.
Win	15–3	Mike Lullo	Decision (unanimous)	UFC Fight Night: Shields vs. Ellenberger	September 17, 2011	3	5:00	New Orleans, Louisiana, United States	
Win	14–3	Hiroyuki Takaya	Decision (split)	Strikeforce: Diaz vs. Daley	April 9, 2011	3	5:00	San Diego, California, United States	
Win	13–3	Chris Kirtley	Submission (triangle choke)	Gladiator Challenge: Legends Collide 2	February 20, 2011	2	2:42	San Jacinto, California, United States	Defended Gladiator Challenge Featherweight Championship.
Win	12–3	Randy Connelly	TKO (punches)	Gladiator Challenge: Season's Beatings 2	December 12, 2010	1	0:12	San Jacinto, California, United States	Won Gladiator Challenge Featherweight Championship.
Win	11–3	Thomas Noel	TKO (punches)	Gladiator Challenge: Royal Flush	October 24, 2010	2	1:27	San Jacinto, California, United States	Defended Gladiator Challenge Flyweight Championship.
Win	10–3	Xavier Strokes	Submission	Gladiator Challenge: Maximum Force	April 25, 2010	3	4:39	San Jacinto, California, United States	Won Gladiator Challenge Flyweight Championship.
Win	9–3	Ben Champeaux	TKO (punches)	Gladiator Challenge: Vision Quest	February 21, 2010	1	1:21	San Jacinto, California, United States	
Win	8–3	Rob Hawkes	KO (punches)	Gladiator Challenge: Never Quit	November 8, 2009	1	0:10	San Jacinto, California, United States	
Loss	7–3	Landon Piercy	Submission (choke)	Gladiator Challenge: High Impact	July 23, 2009	2	4:41	San Jacinto, California, United States	
Win	7–2	Darrell Montague	TKO (punches)	Gladiator Challenge: Warriors	February 4, 2009	3	2:55	San Jacinto, California, United States	
Win	6–2	Willie Gates	TKO (punches)	GC 85: Cross Fire	October 25, 2008	1	3:50	San Diego, California, United States	
Win	5–2	Lorenzo Bencomo	TKO (punches)	MMAX 18: Going Home	January 26, 2008	1	1:06	Tijuana, Mexico	
Win	4–2	Gil Aguilar	TKO (punches)	MMA Xtreme 17	December 15, 2007	2	0:40	Choluteca, Honduras	
Win	3–2	John Wallace	KO (punches)	MMA Xtreme 14	October 13, 2007	2	0:31	Choluteca, Honduras	
Loss	2–2	Fred Leavy	Decision	MMA Xtreme 12	June 30, 2007	3	N/A	Mexicali, Mexico	
Win	2–1	Mauricio Castillo	TKO (punches)	MMA Xtreme 11	April 21, 2007	1	0:21	Tijuana, Mexico	
Win	1–1	John Wallace	KO (punches)	MMA Xtreme 10	March 31, 2007	1	0:53	Santo Domingo, Dominican Republic	
Loss	0–1	Yahir Reyes	Submission (rear-naked choke)	MMA Xtreme 9	March 3, 2007	1	N/A	Tijuana, Mexico	

== Bare knuckle record ==
Professional record breakdown
6 matches	4 wins	1 loss
By knockout	0	1
By decision	4	0
Draws	1	

Res.	Record	Opponent	Method	Event	Date	Round	Time	Location	Notes
Draw	4–1–1	Bryan Duran	Draw (majority)	BKFC 78	July 12, 2025	5	2:00	Hollywood, Florida, United States	
Win	4–1	JorDan Christensen	Decision (unanimous)	BKFC Fight Night Pechanga: Kurdanov vs. Brito	January 28, 2025	5	2:00	Temecula, California, United States	
Loss	3–1	Bryce Henry	TKO	BKFC 57	February 2, 2024	2	2:00	Hollywood, Florida, United States	
Win	3–0	Martin Brown	Decision (split)	BKFC Fight Night: Jackson 2: Belcher vs. Tate	June 11, 2022	5	2:00	Jackson, Mississippi, United States	
Win	2–0	Peter Petties	Decision (unanimous)	BKFC Fight Night Tampa: Brown vs. Taylor	December 9, 2021	5	2:00	Tampa, Florida, United States	
Win	1–0	Jay Cucciniello	Decision (unanimous)	World Bare Knuckle Fighting Federation	November 9, 2018	5	2:00	Casper, Wyoming, United States	

== See also ==
- List of current UFC fighters
- List of male mixed martial artists
