= UFC on Fox: Velasquez vs. dos Santos =

UFC mixed martial arts event in 2011

- The poster for UFC on Fox: Velasquez vs. dos Santos
- Promotion: Ultimate Fighting Championship
- Date: November 12, 2011
- Venue: Honda Center
- City: Anaheim, California
- Attendance: 11,607
- Total gate: $1,072,187

Event chronology
| UFC 138: Leben vs Munoz | UFC on Fox: Velasquez vs. dos Santos | UFC 139: Shogun vs. Henderson |

UFC on Fox: Velasquez vs. dos Santos (also known as UFC on Fox 1) was a mixed martial arts event held by the Ultimate Fighting Championship on November 12, 2011 at the Honda Center in Anaheim, California.

== Background ==
This card marked the UFC's debut on the Fox Network. Zuffa CEO Lorenzo Fertitta confirmed that the debut show would be a one-hour special with only the main event airing live on television, but a full preliminary card taking place beforehand.

Fox Deportes aired the Guida vs. Henderson, Poirier vs. Garza, Swanson vs. Lamas, and Johnson vs. Harvison fights.

The winner of the Clay Guida/Benson Henderson fight determined who was next to get a title shot against Frankie Edgar (the reigning champion at the time), at UFC 144 in Japan.

The UFC on Fox main event broadcast marked the most-watched live hour ever for MMA in the United States and averaged 5.7 million viewers. The ratings peaked in the United States at 8.8 million viewers for the main event.

== Results ==
Main event (Fox)
| Weight class | | | | Method | Round | Time | Notes |
|---|---|---|---|---|---|---|---|
| Heavyweight | Junior dos Santos | def. | Cain Velasquez (c) | KO (punches) | 1 | 1:04 | (Note: For the UFC Heavyweight Championship.) |
Preliminary card (Facebook)
| Lightweight | Benson Henderson | def. | Clay Guida | Decision (unanimous) (29–28, 30–27, 30–27) | 3 | 5:00 | (Note: This UFC Lightweight Championship title eliminator bout aired on the broadcast followed by the dos Santos vs Velasquez bout.) |
| Featherweight | Dustin Poirier | def. | Pablo Garza | Submission (D'Arce choke) | 2 | 1:32 |
| Featherweight | Ricardo Lamas | def. | Cub Swanson | Submission (arm-triangle choke) | 2 | 2:16 |
| Welterweight | DaMarques Johnson | def. | Clay Harvison | KO (punches) | 1 | 1:34 | (Note: This bout aired on the broadcast following the dos Santos vs Velasquez bout.) |
| Bantamweight | Darren Uyenoyama | def. | Norifumi Yamamoto | Decision (unanimous) (30–27, 30–26, 30–27) | 3 | 5:00 |
| Featherweight | Robbie Peralta | vs. | Mackens Semerzier | No Contest (accidental clash of heads) | 3 | 1:54 | (Note: Originally ruled a TKO victory for Peralta, result was overturned due to replay indicating the damage was initiated by an accidental headbutt.) |
| Bantamweight | Alex Caceres | def. | Cole Escovedo | Decision (unanimous) (30–27, 30–27, 30–27) | 3 | 5:00 |
| Welterweight | Mike Pierce | def. | Paul Bradley | Decision (split) (28–29, 30–27, 29–28) | 3 | 5:00 |
| Light Heavyweight | Aaron Rosa | def. | Matt Lucas | Decision (majority) (28–28, 30–26, 30–26) | 3 | 5:00 | (Note: Lucas had 1 point deducted in round 2 for dropping his mouthpiece for the second time.) |

== Bonus awards ==
The following fighters received $65,000 bonuses.

- Fight of the Night: Clay Guida vs. Benson Henderson
- Knockout of the Night: Junior dos Santos
- Submission of the Night: Ricardo Lamas

== Reported payout ==
The following is the reported payout to the fighters as reported to the California State Athletic Commission. It does not include sponsor money or "locker room" bonuses often given by the UFC and also do not include the UFC's traditional "fight night" bonuses.

- Junior dos Santos: $220,000 ($110,000 win bonus) def. Cain Velasquez: $100,000
- Ben Henderson: $60,000 ($30,000 win bonus) def. Clay Guida: $40,000
- Dustin Poirier: $20,000 ($10,000 win bonus) def. Pablo Garza: $8,000
- Ricardo Lamas: $20,000 ($10,000 win bonus) def. Cub Swanson: $15,000
- DaMarques Johnson: $28,000 ($14,000 win bonus) def. Clay Harvison: $8,000
- Darren Uyenoyama: $12,000 ($6,000 win bonus) def. Norifumi Yamamoto: $15,000
- Robert Peralta: $16,000 ($8,000 win bonus) def. Mackens Semerzier: $8,000
- Alex Caceres: $16,000 ($8,000 win bonus) def. Cole Escovedo: $6,000
- Mike Pierce: $36,000 ($18,000 win bonus) def. Paul Bradley: $8,000
- Aaron Rosa: $12,000 ($6,000 win bonus) def. Matt Lucas: $6,000

== See also ==
- List of UFC events
