= UFC on Fuel TV: Struve vs. Miocic =

UFC mixed martial arts event in 2012

- The poster for UFC on Fuel TV: Struve vs. Miocic
- Promotion: Ultimate Fighting Championship
- Date: September 29, 2012
- Venue: Capital FM Arena
- City: Nottingham, United Kingdom
- Attendance: 7,241
- Total gate: $970,000

Event chronology
| UFC 152: Jones vs. Belfort | UFC on Fuel TV: Struve vs. Miocic | UFC on FX: Browne vs. Bigfoot |

UFC on Fuel TV: Struve vs. Miocic (also known as UFC on Fuel TV 5) was a mixed martial arts event held by the Ultimate Fighting Championship on September 29, 2012, at Capital FM Arena in Nottingham, United Kingdom.

== Background ==
Jörgen Kruth was expected to make his UFC debut against Fabio Maldonado at this event. However, Kruth dropped out of the fight to retire from mixed martial arts. As a result, Maldonado was pulled from the event and faced Glover Teixeira at UFC 153.

Pascal Krauss was expected to face promotional newcomer Gunnar Nelson at the event. However, Krauss was forced out of the bout with an injury and Nelson was briefly linked to fight with Rich Attonito in a catchweight bout to be contested at 175 lb. However, Attonito had reservations about taking the short notice bout due to the weight cut requirements. DaMarques Johnson was slated to take on Nelson at catch weight 175 lb, but DaMarques missed the weight by 8 lb, while Gunnar weighted at 175 lb. Gunnar agreed to fight DaMarques nevertheless.

== Results ==
Main Card (Fuel TV)
| Weight class | | | | Method | Round | Time | Notes |
|---|---|---|---|---|---|---|---|
| Heavyweight | Stefan Struve | def. | Stipe Miocic | TKO (punches) | 2 | 3:50 |
| Welterweight | Dan Hardy | def. | Amir Sadollah | Decision (unanimous) (29–28, 29–28, 30–27) | 3 | 5:00 |
| Bantamweight | Brad Pickett | def. | Yves Jabouin | KO (punch) | 1 | 3:40 |
| Lightweight | Matt Wiman | def. | Paul Sass | Submission (armbar) | 1 | 3:48 |
| Welterweight | John Hathaway | def. | John Maguire | Decision (unanimous) (30–27, 30–27, 30–27) | 3 | 5:00 |
| Welterweight | Che Mills | def. | Duane Ludwig | TKO (knee injury) | 1 | 2:28 |
Preliminary Card (Facebook)
| Light Heavyweight | Jimi Manuwa | def. | Kyle Kingsbury | TKO (doctor stoppage) | 2 | 5:00 |
| Featherweight | Akira Corassani | def. | Andy Ogle | Decision (split) (29–28, 27–30, 29–28) | 3 | 5:00 |
| Middleweight | Brad Tavares | def. | Tom Watson | Decision (split) (30–27, 28–29, 29–28) | 3 | 5:00 |
| Catchweight (183 lb) | Gunnar Nelson | def. | DaMarques Johnson | Submission (rear-naked choke) | 1 | 3:34 | (Note: This bout aired on the broadcast following the Wiman vs Sass bout.) |
| Featherweight | Robbie Peralta | def. | Jason Young | KO (punches) | 1 | 0:23 | (Note: This bout aired on the broadcast following the Mills vs Ludwig bout.) |

== Bonus awards ==
The following fighters received $40,000 bonuses.

- Fight of the Night: Stefan Struve vs. Stipe Miocic
- Knockout of the Night: Brad Pickett
- Submission of the Night: Matt Wiman

== See also ==
- List of UFC events
- 2012 in UFC
