= DaMarques Johnson =

American mixed martial arts fighter

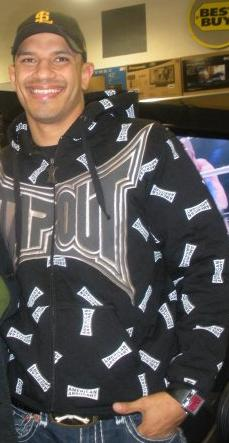
- Born: June 28, 1982 (age 44); West Jordan, Utah, United States
- Other names: Darkness
- Nationality: American
- Height: 6 ft 0 in (1.83 m)
- Weight: 170 lb (77 kg; 12 st)
- Division: Middleweight Welterweight
- Reach: 75 in (190 cm)
- Fighting out of: Sandy, Utah, United States
- Team: Elite Performance
- Rank: Brown belt in Brazilian jiu-jitsu
- Years active: 2005–present

Mixed martial arts record
- Total: 31
- Wins: 16
- By knockout: 6
- By submission: 8
- By decision: 2
- Losses: 15
- By knockout: 5
- By submission: 8
- By decision: 2

Other information
- Mixed martial arts record from Sherdog

DaMarques Johnson (born June 28, 1982) is a retired American mixed martial artist. He competed for the UFC and King of the Cage and was the Welterweight runner-up on The Ultimate Fighter: United States vs. United Kingdom.

== Background ==
Johnson was born and raised in West Jordan, Utah, he and his family were poor and lived in a rough part of the town. Johnson was primarily raised by his Mormon mother, as his father died when he was nine years old. Johnson attended and graduated from Kearns High School, where he competed in wrestling and basketball and would often get into fights. In 2000, Johnson joined the United States Army and National Guard, an option given to him as a kid to get out of some trouble. Johnson, who was a standout in hand to hand combat, worked in the S-1 and did paperwork for other soldiers while assigned to a Special Forces group. It was in 2001, while still enlisted, when a fellow soldier in his platoon introduced to Johnson to Brazilian jiu-jitsu. He trained at Close Combat Institute (CCI) After returning to civilian life following his eight years of active duty, he met Jeremy Horn and began training in mixed martial arts at his gym. Before taping for the Ultimate Fighter, DaMarques taught children's Brazilian jiu-jitsu classes at Sandy's Elite Performance gym.

== Mixed martial arts career ==
=== Early career ===
Johnson, who in the earlier portions of his career fought as high in the weight classes as Heavyweight had his first fight in 2005, losing by technical knockout. He was submitted by the highly regarded Brock Larson in his second fight. In his third professional fight, Johnson had his first win at a King of the Cage event, winning the fight by submission due to punches.

=== The Ultimate Fighter ===
Johnson appeared on The Ultimate Fighter: United States vs. United Kingdom. He defeated Ray Elbe by technical knockout in an elimination match earning him a spot on the United States team. Johnson won his second fight against Dean Amasinger by submission using a triangle choke, which is noted by his coaches and teammates to be his signature submission move. Johnson won his semi-final match up against Nick Osipczak by unanimous decision. This win earned him the first spot in the Welterweight Finals.

Johnson also gained notoriety throughout the series due to his ongoing feud with Team UK coach Michael Bisping. Tensions reached an all-time high after Bisping squirted water into Johnson's face citing that Johnson had made a racist comment toward him earlier in the week. However, the comment was made by fellow USA teammate Cameron Dollar, causing Bisping to apologize to Johnson for his behavior.

=== Ultimate Fighting Championship ===
Johnson lost his UFC debut when he fought James Wilks on June 20, 2009, in Las Vegas to crown the TUF 9 welterweight winner. Johnson tapped out to a rear-naked choke with six seconds left in round one. After the finale, Johnson was offered a multi-fight contract with the UFC.

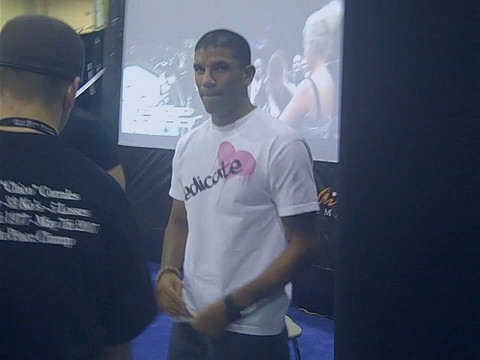
At UFC 100 Fan Expo in Las Vegas

Johnson was scheduled to face off against Peter Sobotta on November 14, 2009, at UFC 105, but the bout was cancelled due to a military commitment for Sobotta. Johnson instead fought and defeated Edgar García via submission (triangle choke) in the first round at UFC 107, earning him a Submission of the Night bonus. UFC.com ranked the submission fourth in the UFC's 2009 Submission of Year and had honorable mention for UFC's 2009 Fight of the Year.

At UFC 112, Johnson fought seasoned veteran Brad Blackburn, defeating him via third-round TKO with a kick to the body and follow up punches. Johnson received his second UFC bonus, winning Knockout of the Night honors.

Johnson then faced Matthew Riddle on August 1, 2010, at UFC on Versus 2. However, Johnson weighed in at 172.5 lb (and only lost half a pound after the weigh-in). Johnson had to give up 20% of his purse to Riddle. Riddle defeated Johnson via TKO in the second round.

Johnson next faced Mike Guymon on January 22, 2011, at UFC Fight Night 23. He won the fight via verbal submission in the first round after applying a body triangle.

Johnson faced Amir Sadollah on March 26, 2011, at UFC Fight Night 24, replacing an injured James Wilks on just two weeks notice. Johnson lost the bout in the second round after tapping out to elbows while he was trapped in the 'gift wrap' control.

Johnson was expected to face Clay Harvison on September 17, 2011, at UFC Fight Night 25 However, Johnson was forced from the bout with an injury and replaced by Seth Baczynski.

Johnson/Harvison took place on November 12, 2011, at UFC on Fox 1. Johnson won the fight via first-round KO after hitting Harvison with an uppercut that knocked him down and seemingly unconscious.

Johnson fought British fighter John Maguire on April 14, 2012, at UFC on Fuel TV: Gustafsson vs. Silva. He lost the fight via submission in the second round.

Johnson faced Mike Swick on August 4, 2012, at UFC on FOX 4. Swick rocked Johnson early in the first round but Johnson weathered the storm and seemed to have the advantage at the end of the round with his grappling. Early in the second round Swick leg swept Johnson to the ground and finished him off with a punch; followed by two more strikes to an already unconscious Johnson.

Johnson was tabbed as a short notice replacement and faced promotional newcomer Gunnar Nelson at a catchweight of 175 lbs. on September 29, 2012, at UFC on Fuel TV 5, replacing an injured Pascal Krauss. Johnson did not make weight, coming in at 186.5 lbs. and lost the fight via first round submission due to a rear naked choke. After his loss to Nelson and missing weight by 16.5 lbs., Johnson was released from the UFC.

=== Post-UFC career ===
Johnson was expected to face Jason South at Showdown Fights 10 on February 8, 2013, however the bout was cancelled prior to the event.

Finally, over a year after his UFC release, Johnson faced Ian Williams at Cage Warrior Combat 9 on November 2, 2013. He lost the fight via split decision. He was then expected to face Indalecio Tat Romero at Dakota FC: Winter Brawl on January 11, 2014. However, Johnson was forced out of the bout due to injury.

He was expected to face Dan Stittgen in the main event of APFC 16 on April 5, 2014, however Johnson was removed from the bout and the fight was cancelled.

Johnson fought Matt Dwyer at Battlefield Fight League 30 on May 23, 2014. He lost via second-round TKO, bringing his losing streak to five in a row.

== Personal life ==
Johnson has a son.

== Championships and accomplishments ==
- Throwdown Showdown
  - TS Welterweight Championship (One time)
- Ultimate Fighting Championship
  - Submission of the Night (One time) vs. Edgar García
  - Knockout of the Night (One time) vs. Brad Blackburn
  - UFC.com Awards
    - 2009: Ranked #4 Submission of the Year vs. Edgar Garcia

== Mixed martial arts record ==
Professional record breakdown
31 matches	16 wins	15 losses
By knockout	6	5
By submission	8	8
By decision	2	2

Res.	Record	Opponent	Method	Event	Date	Round	Time	Location	Notes
Loss	16–15	Joe Rodriguez	Submission (shoulder choke)	SteelFist Fight Night 36: Conflict	August 7, 2015	2	3:52	Salt Lake City, Utah, United States	Middleweight bout.
Loss	16–14	Matt Dwyer	TKO (punches)	BFL 30: Battlefield Fight League	May 23, 2014	2	3:39	Richmond, British Columbia, Canada	175 lb Catchweight bout; Johnson missed weight.
Loss	16–13	Ian Williams	Decision (split)	Cage Warrior Combat 9	November 2, 2013	3	5:00	Kent, Washington, United States	
Loss	16–12	Gunnar Nelson	Submission (rear-naked choke)	UFC on Fuel TV: Struve vs. Miocic	September 29, 2012	1	3:34	Nottingham, England	183 lb Catchweight bout.
Loss	16–11	Mike Swick	KO (punches)	UFC on Fox: Shogun vs. Vera	August 4, 2012	2	1:20	Los Angeles, California, United States	
Loss	16–10	John Maguire	Submission (armbar)	UFC on Fuel TV: Gustafsson vs. Silva	April 14, 2012	2	4:40	Stockholm, Sweden	
Win	16–9	Clay Harvison	KO (punches)	UFC on Fox: Velasquez vs. Dos Santos	November 12, 2011	1	1:34	Anaheim, California, United States	
Loss	15–9	Amir Sadollah	TKO (submission to elbows)	UFC Fight Night: Nogueira vs. Davis	March 26, 2011	2	3:27	Seattle, Washington, United States	
Win	15–8	Mike Guymon	Submission (body triangle)	UFC: Fight for the Troops 2	January 22, 2011	1	3:22	Killeen, Texas, United States	
Loss	14–8	Matthew Riddle	TKO (punches)	UFC Live: Jones vs. Matyushenko	August 1, 2010	2	4:29	San Diego, California, United States	172 lb Catchweight bout; Johnson missed weight.
Win	14–7	Brad Blackburn	TKO (kick to the body)	UFC 112	April 10, 2010	3	2:08	Abu Dhabi, United Arab Emirates	Knockout of the Night.
Win	13–7	Edgar García	Submission (triangle choke)	UFC 107	December 12, 2009	1	4:03	Memphis, Tennessee, United States	Submission of the Night.
Loss	12–7	James Wilks	Submission (rear-naked choke)	The Ultimate Fighter 9 Finale	June 20, 2009	1	4:54	Las Vegas, Nevada, United States	The Ultimate Fighter: United States vs. United Kingdom Welterweight tournament final.
Loss	12–6	Ryan Williams	Decision (unanimous)	Extreme Challenge 109	October 18, 2008	3	5:00	Moline, Illinois, United States	
Win	12–5	Brandon Olsen	Submission (triangle choke)	Throwdown Showdown 2	September 26, 2008	2	1:31	Orem, Utah, United States	Won the TS Welterweight Championship.
Win	11–5	Ron Vincent	TKO (punches)	Jeremy Horn's Elite Fight Night 3	July 12, 2008	1	2:36	Salt Lake City, Utah, United States	
Win	10–5	Samuel Rauch	Submission (triangle choke)	Total Mayhem 1	May 31, 2008	2	2:50	Ogden, Utah, United States	
Win	9–5	Harold Lucambio	Submission (triangle choke)	Throwdown Showdown 1	April 18, 2008	1	1:53	Orem, Utah, United States	
Win	8–5	Sterling Nitsuma	KO (punch)	Jeremy Horn's Elite Fight Night 1	April 5, 2008	1	2:05	Salt Lake City, Utah, United States	
Win	7–5	William Layton	TKO (strikes)	UCE Round 28: Episode 2	October 13, 2007	1	0:55	Salt Lake City, Utah, United States	
Loss	6–5	Court McGee	Submission (guillotine choke)	UCE Round 26: Finals	June 16, 2007	3	1:50	St. George, Utah, United States	
Win	6–4	Hank Weiss	Submission (strikes)	UCE Round 26: Episode 9	June 2, 2007	2	1:15	Sandy, Utah, United States	
Win	5–4	Harold Lucambio	Decision (unanimous)	UCE Round 25: Finals	March 17, 2007	3	3:00	West Valley City, Utah, United States	
Loss	4–4	Justin Wright	TKO (punches)	UCE Round 23: Episode 7	November 11, 2006	1	4:27	Sandy, Utah, United States	
Win	4–3	Tim Panter	TKO (punches)	UCE Round 23: Episode 3	October 14, 2006	2	5:00	Sandy, Utah, United States	
Win	3–3	Jake Paul	Submission (kimura)	Utah Fight Night 1	June 30, 2006	1	4:16	Salt Lake City, Utah, United States	
Win	2–3	Harold Lucambio	Decision (split)	UCE: Round 19: Episode 2	January 14, 2006	5	3:00	Sandy, Utah, United States	
Loss	1–3	Justin Wright	Submission (triangle choke)	UCE Round 18: Episode 6	December 10, 2005	2	1:48	Salt Lake City, Utah, United States	
Win	1–2	David Rodrique	TKO (submission to punches)	KOTC: Shock and Awe	October 1, 2005	1	1:51	Edmonton, Alberta, Canada	
Loss	0–2	Brock Larson	Submission (keylock)	Extreme Challenge 63	July 23, 2005	3	1:02	Hayward, Wisconsin, United States	
Loss	0–1	Paul Purcell	TKO (punches)	XFC: Dome Of Destruction 1	April 29, 2005	1	0:17	Tacoma, Washington, United States	
