= Clay Harvison =

American mixed martial artist (born 1980)

- Born: September 25, 1980 (age 46); Marietta, Georgia, United States
- Other names: Heavy Metal
- Height: 6 ft 1 in (1.85 m)
- Weight: 156.5 lb (71.0 kg; 11.18 st)
- Division: Welterweight; Lightweight
- Reach: 73.0 in (185 cm)
- Fighting out of: Atlanta, Georgia, United States
- Team: American Top Team; Madhouse Training; Team Gwinnett
- Years active: 2006–present

Mixed martial arts record
- Total: 23
- Wins: 14
- By knockout: 6
- By submission: 4
- By decision: 4
- Losses: 9
- By knockout: 3
- By submission: 4
- By decision: 2

Other information
- Mixed martial arts record from Sherdog

Clay Harvison (born September 25, 1980) is an American mixed martial artist who competes in the lightweight division. A professional competitor since 2006, Harvison has competed for the UFC, Bellator, and was a competitor on The Ultimate Fighter: Team Lesnar vs. Team dos Santos.

== Background ==
Harvison earned his associate degree in finance from Tallahassee Community College.

== Mixed martial arts career ==
=== The Ultimate Fighter ===
In 2011, Harvison had signed with the UFC to compete in The Ultimate Fighter: Team Lesnar vs. Team dos Santos.

Harvison was picked fourth on Team Lesnar and seventh overall. In the fifth preliminary match-up, Harvison's first fight on the show, he fought Englishman Mick Bowman. Harvison controlled the fight using effective striking, and showing good take down defense. Harvison won the fight via unanimous decision, and was set to go into the quarterfinal round. After the fight was over it was discovered while trying to block a high kick from Bowman, it was believed that Harvison suffered a compound fracture in his pinky finger with the bone protruding from the skin. However, an X-ray later revealed the injury to only be a dislocation rather than a fracture.

Harvison faced Ramsey Nijem in his quarterfinal match. Harvison lost to Nijem via submission due to a rear-naked choke in the first round.

=== Ultimate Fighting Championship ===
Even though he lost to Ramsey in the quarterfinals, Harvison remained signed after the show. He made his official UFC debut June 4, 2011 on The Ultimate Fighter 13 Finale card, fighting against fellow castmate Justin Edwards. He won the fight via split decision.

Harvison moved from Georgia to Utah to train with his Ultimate Fighter castmate, Ramsey Nijem, at the Riven Academy. Harvison was expected to face The Ultimate Fighter: United States vs. United Kingdom runner-up, DaMarques Johnson, on September 17, 2011, at UFC Fight Night 25. However, Johnson was forced out of the bout with an injury and replaced by Seth Baczynski. He was defeated by rear naked choke submission in the second round.

Harvison was scheduled again to fight DaMarques Johnson. The bout took place on November 12, 2011, at UFC on Fox 1. Harvison lost the bout via first-round KO. After the loss to Johnson, Harvison was released from the promotion.

=== Bellator MMA ===
Harvison made his Bellator debut on February 7, 2013, when he faced Ururahy Rodrigues at Bellator 88. He won the fight via TKO (knee) in the third round.

== Mixed martial arts record ==
Professional record breakdown
| 23 matches | 14 wins | 9 losses |
| By knockout | 6 | 3 |
| By submission | 4 | 4 |
| By decision | 4 | 2 |

| Res. | Record | Opponent | Method | Event | Date | Round | Time | Location | Notes |
|---|---|---|---|---|---|---|---|---|---|
| Loss | 14–9 | Jonathan Cobb | TKO (punches) | NFC 121 | October 12, 2019 | 1 | 4:21 | Kennesaw, Georgia, United States | |
| Win | 14–8 | Mike Barnett | Decision (unanimous) | LFA 71 | July 12, 2019 | 3 | 5:00 | Atlanta, Georgia, United States | Catchweight (157 lbs) bout. |
| Loss | 13–8 | Yemi Oduwole | Decision (unanimous) | NFC 114 | December 7, 2018 | 3 | 5:00 | Kennesaw, Georgia, United States | Welterweight bout. |
| Loss | 13–7 | Brandon Longano | Submission | NFC 96 | June 30, 2017 | 2 | 1:05 | Kennesaw, Georgia, United States | |
| Loss | 13–6 | Jordan Rinaldi | Submission (rear-naked choke) | Legacy FC 47 | October 16, 2015 | 2 | 4:31 | Atlanta, Georgia, United States | |
| Win | 13–5 | Joe Elmore | Decision (unanimous) | Legacy FC 40 | March 20, 2015 | 3 | 5:00 | Duluth, Georgia, United States | |
| Win | 12–5 | David Lindsey | TKO (punches) | Wild Bill's Fight Night 62 | January 25, 2014 | 3 | 0:57 | Duluth, Georgia, United States | Welterweight bout. |
| Win | 11–5 | Ran Weathers | Decision (unanimous) | Wild Bill's Fight Night 58 | July 19, 2013 | 3 | 5:00 | Duluth, Georgia, United States | Lightweight debut. |
| Win | 10–5 | Ururahy Rodrigues | TKO (knee) | Bellator 88 | February 7, 2013 | 3 | 3:34 | Duluth, Georgia, United States | Catchweight (160 lbs) bout. |
| Loss | 9–5 | Ronnie Rogers | Decision (split) | Wild Bill's Fight Night 49 | September 15, 2012 | 3 | 5:00 | Duluth, Georgia, United States | |
| Loss | 9–4 | DaMarques Johnson | KO (punches) | UFC on Fox: Velasquez vs. Dos Santos | November 12, 2011 | 1 | 1:34 | Anaheim, California, United States | |
| Loss | 9–3 | Seth Baczynski | Submission (rear-naked choke) | UFC Fight Night: Shields vs. Ellenberger | September 17, 2011 | 2 | 1:12 | New Orleans, Louisiana, United States | |
| Win | 9–2 | Justin Edwards | Decision (split) | The Ultimate Fighter 13 Finale | June 4, 2011 | 3 | 5:00 | Las Vegas, Nevada, United States | |
| Win | 8–2 | Aric Nelson | TKO (punches) | Wild Bill's Fight Night 28 | June 25, 2010 | 1 | 0:51 | Duluth, Georgia, United States | |
| Win | 7–2 | Travis Adams | TKO (punches) | Clash of the Kings | October 23, 2009 | 1 | 3:15 | Kennesaw, Georgia, United States | |
| Loss | 6–2 | Matt Traylor | TKO (punches) | KoKings | June 20, 2009 | 1 | 2:08 | Atlanta, Georgia, United States | |
| Win | 6–1 | Shawn Snow | Submission (armbar) | Fight Party: Revenge | May 16, 2009 | 1 | 4:30 | Duluth, Georgia, United States | |
| Win | 5–1 | Sean Dyer | TKO (punches) | Bullet Fight Gear: Last Man Standing | February 21, 2009 | 1 | 3:01 | Kennesaw, Georgia, United States | |
| Win | 4–1 | Blake Bowman | Submission | ISCF: Gladiator X | December 13, 2008 | 1 | 3:01 | Atlanta, Georgia, United States | |
| Loss | 3–1 | Jeremy Germenis | Submission (rear-naked choke) | Bullet Fight Gear: Showdown | March 14, 2008 | 2 | 1:17 | Kennesaw, Georgia, United States | |
| Win | 3–0 | Josh Rutgers | Submission (punches) | Wild Bill's Fight Night 13 | January 25, 2008 | 1 | 1:37 | Atlanta, Georgia, United States | |
| Win | 2–0 | Will Baggett | TKO (punches) | ISCF: Head-On Collision | June 1, 2007 | 2 | 1:55 | Kennesaw, Georgia, United States | |
| Win | 1–0 | Joshua Fountain | Submission | Wild Bill's Fight Night 6 | January 19, 2007 | 1 | 3:43 | Georgia, United States | |
