= Edgar García (fighter) =

Mexican mixed martial arts fighter (born 1995)

- Born: February 26, 1985 (age 41); San Luis Río Colorado, Sonora, Mexico
- Height: 5 ft 10 in (1.78 m)
- Weight: 170 lb (77 kg; 12 st), 185 lb (84 kg; 13.2 st)
- Division: Welterweight; Middleweight (current)
- Reach: 71.0 in (180 cm)
- Fighting out of: Somerton, Az
- Team: Somerton Top Team
- Years active: 2007–present

Mixed martial arts record
- Total: 19
- Wins: 14
- By knockout: 7
- By submission: 5
- By decision: 2
- Losses: 5
- By knockout: 2
- By submission: 2
- By decision: 1

Other information
- Mixed martial arts record from Sherdog

Edgar García (born February 26, 1985) is a Mexican professional mixed martial artist who competes in the Welterweight and Middleweight divisions.

== Mixed martial arts career ==
=== World Extreme Cagefighting ===
García made his WEC debut on January 25, 2009, facing Hiromitsu Miura at WEC 38. García, being the underdog coming into the fight, managed to knockout Miura out little over a minute into the first round.

=== Ultimate Fighting Championship ===
After the folding of the WEC Welterweight division, the Ultimate Fighting Championship picked up his contract and he made his UFC debut at The Ultimate Fighter: United States vs. United Kingdom Finale, losing a controversial split decision to Brad Blackburn. After the decision was read, the fans at the arena booed Blackburn very loudly, and UFC commentator Joe Rogan implied that García should have won the decision.

At UFC 107, García lost to DaMarques Johnson by triangle choke in the first round. At the conclusion of UFC 107, García was released from the promotion along with Kevin Burns, Shane Nelson and Darrill Schoonover.

=== Fight in Bellator and regional stage ===
Since leaving the UFC, García has gone 7–1, with his most recent fight being a win over Bellator vet Jordan Smith at Showdown Fights 13 on January 24, 2014.

=== UFC return ===
García resigned with the UFC in September 2014. He faced Héctor Urbina on November 15, 2014, at UFC 180. He lost he bout via submission in the first round. This was the second fight between two Mexicans inside the UFC octagon.

García was expected to face Andrew Craig on July 15, 2015, at UFC Fight Night 71. However, García was forced from the bout with injury and replaced by promotional newcomer Lyman Good.

García was expected to face Sheldon Westcott on December 10, 2015, at UFC Fight Night 80. However, the pairing was moved to UFC 195 a few weeks later to bolster the card. García lost the fight via TKO in the first round.

== Personal life ==
Edgar resides in Somerton Arizona a former Arizona State Champion for Cibola High School.

== Mixed martial arts record ==
Professional record breakdown
19 matches	14 wins	5 losses
By knockout	7	2
By submission	5	2
By decision	2	1

Res.	Record	Opponent	Method	Event	Date	Round	Time	Location	Notes
Loss	14–5	Sheldon Westcott	TKO (punches)	UFC 195	January 2, 2016	1	3:12	Las Vegas, Nevada, United States	
Loss	14–4	Héctor Urbina	Submission (guillotine choke)	UFC 180	November 15, 2014	1	3:38	Mexico City, Mexico	
Win	14–3	Jordan Smith	Decision (split)	Showdown Fights 13 - Lopez vs. Castillo	January 24, 2014	3	5:00	Orem, Utah, United States	
Win	13–3	Leroy Fornof	Submission (kimura)	WFF: Pascua Yaqui Fights 4	March 2, 2013	1	1:54	Tucson, Arizona, United States	
Win	12–3	Ty Tecumseh	TKO (punches)	Desert Rage Full Contact Fighting 11	October 20, 2012	1	1:12	Yuma, Arizona, United States	
Win	11–3	Patrick Dixon	Submission (guillotine choke)	WFF 8: Fight at the Fields	May 12, 2012	1	0:32	Scottsdale, Arizona, United States	
Loss	10–3	Jacob Ortiz	KO (punch)	Bellator 55	October 22, 2011	1	4:06	Yuma, Arizona, United States	
Win	10–2	Jason Anderson	TKO (punches)	Desert Rage Full Contact Fighting 9	March 18, 2011	1	0:58	Yuma, Arizona, United States	
Win	9–2	Mike Moreno	Submission (guillotine choke)	TPF 8: All or Nothing	February 18, 2011	1	1:47	Lemoore, California, United States	Middleweight debut.
Win	8–2	Alejandro Velasquez	Submission (triangle choke)	LAF 1: Border Wars	December 11, 2010	2	2:16	Mexicali, Mexico	
Loss	7–2	DaMarques Johnson	Submission (triangle choke)	UFC 107	December 12, 2009	1	4:03	Memphis, Tennessee, United States	
Loss	7–1	Brad Blackburn	Decision (split)	The Ultimate Fighter: United States vs. United Kingdom Finale	June 20, 2009	3	5:00	Las Vegas, Nevada, United States	
Win	7–0	Hiromitsu Miura	KO (punches)	WEC 38	January 25, 2009	1	1:18	San Diego, California, United States	
Win	6–0	Waylon Kennell	TKO (punches)	Total Combat 30	August 2, 2008	1	3:46	Alpine, California, United States	
Win	5–0	Sean Loeffler	Submission (injury)	Total Combat: Nevada	May 10, 2008	1	1:59	Laughlin, Nevada, United States	
Win	4–0	Efrain Rodriguez	KO (punches)	Total Combat 27	March 22, 2008	1	N/A	Yuma, Arizona, United States	
Win	3–0	Jeremy Larsen	Decision (unanimous)	Cage Supremacy 3	December 8, 2007	3	5:00	Tucson, Arizona, United States	
Win	2–0	Matt Lagler	TKO (punches)	Desert Rage Full Contact Fighting 2	October 20, 2007	1	2:22	Mexicali, Mexico	
Win	1–0	Tony Kalani	KO (punches)	Desert Rage Full Contact Fighting 1	June 30, 2007	1	N/A		

== See also ==
- List of Mexican UFC fighters
- List of male mixed martial artists
