= UFC 107 =

UFC mixed martial arts event in 2009

UFC 107: Penn vs. Sanchez
- The poster for UFC 107: Penn vs. Sanchez
- Promotion: Ultimate Fighting Championship
- Date: December 12, 2009
- Venue: FedExForum
- City: Memphis, Tennessee
- Attendance: 13,896
- Total gate: $1,500,000
- Buyrate: 620,000

Event chronology
The Ultimate Fighter: Heavyweights Finale	UFC 107: Penn vs. Sanchez	UFC 108: Evans vs. Silva

UFC 107: Penn vs. Sanchez was a mixed martial arts event held by the Ultimate Fighting Championship (UFC) on December 12, 2009, in Memphis, Tennessee, at the FedExForum.

== Background ==
On October 21, it was announced that a previous matchup between welterweight contenders Thiago Alves and Paulo Thiago had been changed to Alves vs. Jon Fitch because Fitch's opponent for UFC 106, Ricardo Almeida, suffered an injury. Paulo Thiago fought on UFC 106 on November 21 against UFC newcomer Jacob Volkmann and won the fight by unanimous decision.

It was then announced on October 30 that Fitch would again be without an opponent as Alves was forced to withdraw because of a posterior cruciate ligament tear. It was later announced that Jon Fitch would face Mike Pierce at UFC 107.

Paul Buentello was scheduled to face Todd Duffee on the card, but an injury forced Duffee to pull out. Buentello faced Stefan Struve on the card.

A middleweight bout between Alan Belcher and Wilson Gouveia was changed to a 195-pound catchweight bout after Gouveia asked for a 190-pound catchweight limit, but Belcher gave a counter-offer of 195 pounds.

Another matchup scheduled for this card was a match-up between The Ultimate Fighter: Heavyweights coaches Rashad Evans and Quinton Jackson but the bout was cancelled after Jackson was selected for the role of Cpl. B. A. Baracus in The A-Team film. The fight would later happen at UFC 114.

== Results ==
Main card
Weight class				Method	Round	Time	Notes
Lightweight	B.J. Penn (c)	def.	Diego Sanchez	TKO (doctor stoppage)	5	2:37	(Note: For the UFC Lightweight Championship)
Heavyweight	Frank Mir	def.	Cheick Kongo	Technical Submission (guillotine choke)	1	1:12
Welterweight	Jon Fitch	def.	Mike Pierce	Decision (unanimous) (29–28, 29–28, 29–28)	3	5:00
Lightweight	Kenny Florian	def.	Clay Guida	Submission (rear-naked choke)	2	2:19
Heavyweight	Stefan Struve	def.	Paul Buentello	Decision (majority) (29–28, 29–28, 28–28)	3	5:00
Preliminary card
Catchweight (195 lb)	Alan Belcher	def.	Wilson Gouveia	TKO (punches)	1	3:03
Lightweight	Matt Wiman	def.	Shane Nelson	Decision (unanimous) (30–27, 30–27, 30–27)	3	5:00
Welterweight	Johny Hendricks	def.	Ricardo Funch	Decision (unanimous) (30–27, 30–27, 30–25)	3	5:00
Middleweight	Rousimar Palhares	def.	Lucio Linhares	Submission (heel hook)	2	3:21
Welterweight	DaMarques Johnson	def.	Edgar Garcia	Submission (triangle choke)	1	4:03
Welterweight	T. J. Grant	def.	Kevin Burns	TKO (punches)	1	4:57

== Bonus awards ==
The following fighters received $65,000 bonuses.

- Fight of the Night: Alan Belcher vs. Wilson Gouveia
- Knockout of the Night: T. J. Grant
- Submission of the Night: DaMarques Johnson

== See also ==
- Ultimate Fighting Championship
- List of UFC champions
- List of UFC events
- 2009 in UFC
