= Mackens Semerzier =

American mixed martial arts fighter

- Born: November 3, 1980 (age 45); Miami, Florida, United States
- Other names: Mack Da Menace
- Height: 5 ft 9 in (1.75 m)
- Weight: 145 lb (66 kg; 10.4 st)
- Division: Featherweight
- Reach: 72 in (180 cm)
- Stance: Orthodox
- Fighting out of: Virginia Beach, Virginia, United States
- Team: Team Curran; Pride Training Center
- Rank: Black belt in Brazilian Jiu-Jitsu
- Years active: 2008-2012

Mixed martial arts record
- Total: 13
- Wins: 8
- By knockout: 1
- By submission: 7
- Losses: 4
- By submission: 2
- By decision: 2
- No contests: 1

Other information
- Mixed martial arts record from Sherdog

Mackens Semerzier (born November 3, 1980) is an American retired professional mixed martial artist who last competed in the Featherweight division. A professional competitor from 2008 until 2012, he competed for the UFC and WEC.

== Background ==
In 1999 Mackens placed 6th in the 6A Florida High School Wrestling tournament and was a Disney Duals AAU Wrestling National runner up. At the age of 19, Semerzier signed on to the U.S. Marines. While enrolled, he would begin training a lot of boxing. A little later, through a Marine Corps Martial Arts program, he learned other elements of the MMA game, which he would supplement with training at civilian gyms, most notably Linxx Academy in Virginia Beach, where he still trains and coaches.

== Mixed martial arts career ==
=== Early career ===
Semerzier made his pro debut against Ryan Lamareaux on a local North Carolina MMA card. Semerzier won the bout in the third round after locking up a rear naked choke submission. Only a little over a month after his pro debut, Semerzier had his second fight, again winning via rear naked choke submission.

He won two more fights, finishing both opponents, before signing with the World Extreme Cagefighting in 2009.

=== World Extreme Cagefighting ===
Semerzier made his debut for the promotion at WEC 43 stunning the former IFL Featherweight Champion, Wagnney Fabiano. Semerzier submitted the Brazilian jiu-jitsu ace in the first round via triangle choke. He earned himself Submission of the Night, and also was awarded "Sherdog's 2009 Upset of the Year".

Semerzier suffered his first career loss to Lithuanian grappler Deividas Taurosevičius at WEC 46.

Semerzier was scheduled to face Anthony Morrison on April 24, 2010, at WEC 48, but Semerzier was forced from the card with an injury. Instead of fighting Morrison, he fought Javier Vazquez. Semerzier was defeated via second round submission on August 18, 2010, at WEC 50.

Semerzier was defeated by Cub Swanson via split decision in a back and forth affair on November 11, 2010, at WEC 52 in a bout that earned Fight of the Night honors.

=== Ultimate Fighting Championship ===
In October 2010, World Extreme Cagefighting merged with the Ultimate Fighting Championship. As part of the merger, all WEC fighters were transferred to the UFC.

Semerzier's first fight in the UFC was against UFC newcomer, and The Ultimate Fighter 12 competitor, Alex Caceres, at UFC Fight Night 24. He won the fight via rear naked choke submission early in the first round.

Semerzier was expected to face Yuri Alcantara on August 27, 2011, at UFC 134. However, Semerzier was replaced on the card by UFC newcomer Antonio Carvalho.

Semerzier was expected to face Mike Lullo on September 17, 2011, at UFC Fight Night 25. However, Semerzier was forced from the bout with an injury and was replaced by Robbie Peralta

Semerzier faced Robbie Peralta on November 12, 2011, at UFC on Fox 1. Semerzier officially lost via TKO in the third round, but replays showed that a collision of heads started the stoppage. The fight was later ruled a no contest by the California State Athletic Commission.

A rematch with Peralta was expected to take place on March 3, 2012, at UFC on FX 2. However, Peralta was forced out of the bout with a toe injury and replaced by Daniel Pineda. Pineda defeated Semezier via first round submission.

After losing to Pineda, Semerzier was released from the promotion.

=== Post UFC ===
Semerzier made his return to the cage on August 18, 2012, at XFO 45, defeating Guillermo Serment by submission due to a d'arce choke sixty two seconds into the fight.

He then went to on to face Gilbert Jimenez a few months later on November 17, 2012. He defeated Jimenez via submission in the second round. He has not competed since this.

== Championships and accomplishments ==
World Extreme Cagefighting

- Submission of the Night (One time)
- Fight of the Night (One time)

Sherdog

- 2009 Upset of the Year (vs. Wagnney Fabiano, WEC 43)

== Mixed martial arts record ==
Professional record breakdown
13 matches	8 wins	4 losses
By knockout	1	0
By submission	7	2
By decision	0	2
No contests	1	

Res.	Record	Opponent	Method	Event	Date	Round	Time	Location	Notes
Win	8–4 (1)	Gilbert Jimenez	Submission (guillotine choke)	Combat Sports Challenge 34	November 17, 2012	2	1:52	Richmond, Virginia, United States	
Win	7–4 (1)	Guillermo Serment	Submission (d'arce choke)	XFO 45: Outdoor War 8	August 18, 2012	1	1:02	Island Lake, Illinois, United States	
Loss	6–4 (1)	Daniel Pineda	Submission (triangle armbar)	UFC on FX: Alves vs. Kampmann	March 3, 2012	1	2:05	Sydney, Australia	
NC	6–3 (1)	Robbie Peralta	NC (accidental headbutt)	UFC on Fox: Velasquez vs. Dos Santos	November 12, 2011	3	1:54	Anaheim, California, United States	Overturned; originally loss by TKO.
Win	6–3	Alex Caceres	Submission (rear-naked choke)	UFC Fight Night: Nogueira vs. Davis	March 26, 2011	1	3:18	Seattle, Washington, United States	
Loss	5–3	Cub Swanson	Decision (split)	WEC 52	November 11, 2010	3	5:00	Las Vegas, Nevada, United States	Fight of the Night.
Loss	5–2	Javier Vazquez	Submission (rear-naked choke)	WEC 50	August 18, 2010	2	1:35	Las Vegas, Nevada, United States	
Loss	5–1	Deividas Taurosevičius	Decision (unanimous)	WEC 46	January 10, 2010	3	5:00	Sacramento, California, United States	
Win	5–0	Wagnney Fabiano	Submission (triangle choke)	WEC 43	October 10, 2009	1	2:14	San Antonio, Texas, United States	Submission of the Night.
Win	4–0	Kenny Foster	Submission (triangle choke)	Elite Fighting Challenge 4	June 27, 2009	1	1:03	Norfolk, Virginia, United States	
Win	3–0	Jason Hilliker	TKO (punches)	Cagefest Xtreme: All In	April 25, 2009	1	2:01	Norfolk, Virginia, United States	
Win	2–0	Justin Hickey	Submission (rear-naked choke)	Cagefest Xtreme: Evolution	November 15, 2008	1	4:52	Norfolk, Virginia, United States	
Win	1–0	Ryan Lamareaux	Submission (rear-naked choke)	Vengeance Fighting Championship 1	September 27, 2008	3	3:04	Concord, North Carolina, United States	
