= Elite Performance =

Mixed martial arts training organization in Salt Lake City

Elite Performance Gym
- Est.: 2006
- Founded by: Jeremy Horn
- Primary trainers: Jeremy Horn (head trainer); Matt Pena (head boxing coach)
- Past titleholders: Jeremy Horn Middleweight Champion, (IFC), Light Heavyweight Champion (King of the Cage); Rich Franklin Middleweight Champion (UFC) 185 lb (84 kg) Matt Hughes Welterweight Champion (UFC) 170 lb (77 kg) Jens Pulver Lightweight Champion (UFC) 155 lb (70 kg)
- Prominent fighters: Jeremy Horn; Rich “Ace” Franklin (UFC); Matt Hughes (UFC); Jens Pulver (Cage Warriors); Joe "Diesel" Riggs (ProElite)
- Training facilities: (United States) Salt Lake City, Utah
- Website: www.eliteperformancegym.com

Elite Performance Gym is a mixed martial arts training organization founded by former International Fighting Championships (IFC) middleweight and King of the Cage light heavyweight champion, Jeremy Horn. Elite Performance Gym was founded in Salt Lake City, Utah.

Located in the Sandy area of Salt Lake City, it has an overall area of 5,000 sq ft (460 m^{2}) split between MMA training equipment, and general fitness and weightlifting equipment. Beginner, intermediate, and advanced classes are offered in grappling & submission wrestling, boxing, kick boxing & muay Thai, and strength and conditioning. Horn teaches almost all the classes himself.

== Notable fighters ==
Several fighters have affiliation with Elite Performance Gym, these include:

- (United States) Jeremy Horn - (IFL, KOTC, Pancrase, PRIDE, RINGS, UFC, WEC)
- (United States) Matt Hughes - (RINGS, UFC)
- (United States) Jens Pulver - (WEC, PRIDE, UFC)
- (United States) Rich Franklin - (UFC)
- (United States) Joe Riggs - (K-1, UFC, WEC, Strikeforce, Bellator)
- (United States) Travis Wiuff - (Bellator, UFC, IFL, PRIDE, World Victory Road)
- (United States) DaMarques Johnson (UFC)
- (Egypt) (United States) Amir Khillah

== Elite Fight Night ==
Also known as Jeremy Horn's Elite Fight Night, is a roughly once a month MMA showcase located in Sandy, Utah. These monthly events give local MMA fans and spectators the opportunity to witness their hometown fighters competing against other athletes in a professional venue. Local and corporate sponsors alike fund the events, which local sports commissioning bodies oversee to ensure fairness and safety.
