= Brad Blackburn =

American mixed martial arts fighter

- Born: May 25, 1977 (age 49); Los Angeles, California, US
- Other names: Bad
- Height: 5 ft 10 in (1.78 m)
- Weight: 170 lb (77 kg; 12 st)
- Division: Middleweight; Welterweight; Lightweight
- Reach: 73.0 in (185 cm)
- Stance: Orthodox
- Fighting out of: Seattle, Washington, US
- Team: Victory Athletics
- Years active: 2000–2002; 2004–2011

Mixed martial arts record
- Total: 33
- Wins: 18
- By knockout: 9
- By submission: 4
- By decision: 5
- Losses: 13
- By knockout: 4
- By submission: 1
- By decision: 8
- Draws: 1
- No contests: 1

Other information
- Mixed martial arts record from Sherdog

Brad Lavale Blackburn Jr. (born May 25, 1977) is a retired American mixed martial artist. A professional from 2000 until 2011, he fought for the UFC, Bellator, the Maximum Fighting Championship, and the Seattle Tiger Sharks of the now defunct International Fight League.

== Background ==
At the age of 22, Blackburn began boxing but soon transitioned to MMA after being persuaded to do so by his friends who trained. A "late bloomer," Blackburn stood only 4 ft 10 in (1.47 m) as a high school sophomore.

== Mixed martial arts career ==
=== Early career ===
Blackburn was a contender on the now defunct IFL before signing on to the UFC. He held a record of 15 wins, 9 losses, 1 draw, and 1 no contest before joining the UFC.

=== Ultimate Fighting Championship ===
Blackburn made his UFC debut against James Giboo, winning by TKO due to strikes on UFC Fight Night 14. He would later go on to defeat Ryo Chonan by unanimous decision and Edgar García by split decision.

He then fought TUF 7 winner Amir Sadollah at UFC Fight Night 20 on January 11, 2010. In this fight, Blackburn was rocked badly once in the first round and would go on to get rocked again in the third round by a knee. Blackburn survived Sadollah's attacks, going on to lose by unanimous decision.

Blackburn lost to DaMarques Johnson at UFC 112, and was subsequently released from the organization.

== Personal life ==
Blackburn has two children: a son and a daughter.

== Mixed martial arts record ==
Professional record breakdown
33 matches	18 wins	13 losses
By knockout	9	4
By submission	4	1
By decision	5	8
Draws	1	
No contests	1	

Res.	Record	Opponent	Method	Event	Date	Round	Time	Location	Notes
Loss	18–13–1 (1)	Jory Erickson	TKO (punches)	CageSport 13	February 19, 2011	1	2:50	Tacoma, Washington, United States	
Loss	18–12–1 (1)	Dan Hornbuckle	Decision (unanimous)	Bellator 25	August 19, 2010	3	5:00	Chicago, Illinois, United States	
Loss	18–11–1 (1)	DaMarques Johnson	TKO (kick to the body)	UFC 112	April 10, 2010	3	2:08	Abu Dhabi, United Arab Emirates	
Loss	18–10–1 (1)	Amir Sadollah	Decision (unanimous)	UFC Fight Night: Maynard vs. Diaz	January 11, 2010	3	5:00	Fairfax, Virginia, United States	
Win	18–9–1 (1)	Edgar García	Decision (split)	The Ultimate Fighter 9 Finale	June 20, 2009	3	5:00	Las Vegas, Nevada, United States	
Win	17–9–1 (1)	Ryo Chonan	Decision (unanimous)	UFC 92	December 27, 2008	3	5:00	Las Vegas, Nevada, United States	
Win	16–9–1 (1)	James Giboo	TKO (flying knee and punches)	UFC Fight Night: Silva vs. Irvin	July 19, 2008	2	2:29	Las Vegas, Nevada, United States	
Win	15–9–1 (1)	Delson Heleno	KO (punch)	IFL: New Jersey	April 4, 2008	3	1:50	East Rutherford, New Jersey, United States	
NC	14–9–1 (1)	Travis Cox	No Contest (illegal knee)	IFL: 2007 Team Championship Final	September 20, 2007	1	2:32	Hollywood, Florida, United States	
Win	14–9–1	Jay Hieron	TKO (punches)	IFL: Everett	June 1, 2007	1	0:40	Everett, Washington, United States	
Loss	13–9–1	Mark Miller	Decision (unanimous)	IFL: Moline	April 7, 2007	3	4:00	Moline, Illinois, United States	
Win	13–8–1	Chris Wilson	Decision (unanimous)	IFL: Portland	September 9, 2006	3	4:00	Portland, Oregon, United States	
Loss	12–8–1	Rory Markham	KO (punch)	IFL: Championship 2006	June 3, 2006	2	0:23	East Rutherford, New Jersey, United States	
Win	12–7–1	Gustavo Machado	Decision (split)	IFL: Legends Championship 2006	April 29, 2006	3	4:00	Atlantic City, New Jersey, United States	
Loss	11–7–1	Ray Perales	Decision (split)	XFC: Dome of Destruction 3	October 15, 2005	3	5:00	Tacoma, Washington, United States	
Loss	11–6–1	Roger Huerta	TKO (corner stoppage)	IFC: Rock N' Rumble	July 30, 2005	3	2:19	Reno, Nevada, United States	For the vacant ISKA MMA Welterweight Championship.
Loss	11–5–1	Jay Jack	Submission (forearm choke)	ROF 15: Inferno	February 12, 2005	3	3:18	Colorado, United States	
Loss	11–4–1	Brandon Melendez	Decision (unanimous)	SF 8: Justice	January 8, 2005	3	5:00	Gresham, Oregon, United States	For the vacant SF Welterweight Championship.
Win	11–3–1	Steve Legault	TKO (punches)	APEX: Genesis	September 5, 2004	1	0:14	Montreal, Quebec, Canada	Return to Welterweight.
Win	10–3–1	Ronny Morales	Submission (rear-naked choke)	DB 11: DesertBrawl 11	July 17, 2004	1	4:57	Bend, Oregon, United States	Middleweight debut.
Win	9–3–1	Pat Healy	KO (punches)	RITR 8: Rumble in the Ring 8	November 16, 2002	1	0:39	Auburn, Washington, United States	Lightweight bout.
Loss	8–3–1	Brad Gumm	Decision (unanimous)	MFC 4: New Groundz	June 1, 2002	3	5:00	Calgary, Alberta, Canada	
Loss	8–2–1	Ryan Healy	Decision (split)	FCFF: Rumble at the Roseland 3	May 11, 2002	2	5:00	Portland, Oregon, United States	Lightweight bout.
Win	8–1–1	Quenton Pongracz	TKO (corner stoppage)	MFC 3: Canadian Pride	March 3, 2002	2	2:09	Grand Prairie, Alberta, Canada	
Loss	7–1–1	Grady Hurley	Decision (split)	RITR: Rumble in the Rockies	January 26, 2002	2	3:00	Denver, Colorado, United States	
Win	7–0–1	Clayton Purvis	TKO (cut)	FCFF: Rumble at the Roseland 1	January 19, 2002	1	1:10	Portland, Oregon, United States	
Win	6–0–1	Landon Showalter	Submission (armbar)	UFCF: Olympia Ring Challenge	January 5, 2002	1	2:59	Olympia, Washington, United States	
Win	5–0–1	Ray Perales	Submission (triangle choke)	UFCF: Storm 2001	December 8, 2001	3	2:04	Kirkland, Washington, United States	
Win	4–0–1	Matt Wurstner	Submission (triangle choke)	RITR 4: Rumble in the Ring 4	December 1, 2001	1	2:00	Auburn, Washington, United States	
Draw	3–0–1	Matt Wurstner	Draw	RITR 3: Rumble in the Ring 3	August 25, 2001	3	5:00	Auburn, Washington, United States	Return to Welterweight.
Win	3–0	Pat Healy	KO (punch)	PPKA: Muckleshoot	August 15, 2001	1	0:39	Auburn, Washington, United States	Lightweight debut.
Win	2–0	Jai Walsh	Decision (unanimous)	UFCF: War 2001	April 21, 2001	3	5:00	Kirkland, Washington, United States	
Win	1–0	Jason Dickson	TKO (punches)	UFCF: Everett Extreme Challenge 2	November 4, 2000	1	0:12	Everett, Washington, United States	
