= Lance Benoist =

American mixed martial artist

- Born: Lance Benoist; August 26, 1988 (age 38)
- Nationality: American
- Height: 5 ft 11 in (1.80 m)
- Weight: 170 lb (77 kg; 12 st)
- Division: Welterweight
- Reach: 72 in (183 cm)
- Style: Brazilian Jiu-Jitsu
- Fighting out of: St.Louis, Missouri
- Team: SCMMA/Vaghi
- Rank: Purple belt in Brazilian Jiu-Jitsu
- Years active: 2010-present

Mixed martial arts record
- Total: 9
- Wins: 7
- By knockout: 1
- By submission: 4
- By decision: 2
- Losses: 2
- By decision: 2

Other information
- Mixed martial arts record from Sherdog

Lance Benoist (born August 26, 1988) is an American mixed martial artist. He competed for the Ultimate Fighting Championship in their welterweight division.

== Mixed Martial Arts career ==
=== Early career ===
Benoist went undefeated in his amateur career and compiled a record of 14-0-1, finishing almost all of his opponents in the first round. He had his first professional fight on January 30, 2010 and won the bout via triangle choke submission.

=== Ultimate Fighting Championship ===
In June 2011, Benoist signed a multi-fight contract with the UFC. He faced Matthew Riddle in his Octagon debut. He won the fight via unanimous decision in a bout that earned Fight of the Night honors.

Benoist next faced Seth Baczynski on June 8, 2012 at UFC on FX 3. He lost for the first time in his career via split decision.

Benoist faced Sean Pierson on September 22, 2012 at UFC 152, replacing Dan Miller. He lost the fight via unanimous decision.

Benoist was expected to face Paulo Thiago on May 18, 2013 at UFC on FX 8. However, Benoist was forced out of the bout with a broken leg and was replaced by promotional newcomer Michel Prazeres.

Benoist faced Bobby Voelker on June 7, 2014 at UFC Fight Night 42. He won the back-and-forth fight via unanimous decision.

== Championships and accomplishments ==
- Ultimate Fighting Championship
  - Fight of the Night (One time) vs. Matthew Riddle

== Mixed martial arts record ==
Professional record breakdown
9 matches	7 wins	2 losses
By knockout	1	0
By submission	4	0
By decision	2	2

Res.	Record	Opponent	Method	Event	Date	Round	Time	Location	Notes
Win	7–2	Bobby Voelker	Decision (unanimous)	UFC Fight Night: Henderson vs. Khabilov	June 7, 2014	3	5:00	Albuquerque, New Mexico, United States	
Loss	6–2	Sean Pierson	Decision (unanimous)	UFC 152	September 22, 2012	3	5:00	Toronto, Ontario, Canada	
Loss	6–1	Seth Baczynski	Decision (split)	UFC on FX: Johnson vs. McCall	June 8, 2012	3	5:00	Sunrise, Florida, United States	
Win	6–0	Matt Riddle	Decision (unanimous)	UFC Fight Night: Shields vs. Ellenberger	September 17, 2011	3	5:00	New Orleans, Louisiana, United States	Fight of the Night
Win	5–0	Ryne Vincent	Submission (triangle choke)	CCCW: Fight Night 3	April 30, 2011	1	2:56	St. Louis, Missouri, United States	
Win	4–0	Dustin Baker	Submission (rear-naked choke)	PCL: Cage Madness	March 26, 2011	1	4:36	Glen Carbon, Illinois, United States	
Win	3–0	Miguel Rios	Submission (guillotine choke)	MCC 30: Thanksgiving Throwdown	November 11, 2010	1	0:57	Des Moines, Iowa, United States	
Win	2–0	Cleburn Walker	KO (head kick)	Fight Me MMA 1: The Battle Begins	August 14, 2010	1	4:34	St. Charles, Missouri, United States	
Win	1–0	Jamell Austin	Submission (triangle choke)	Devastation Fight Club	January 30, 2010	1	0:53	Cape Girardeau, Missouri, United States	

== Personal life ==
Lance's identical twin brother, Logan Benoist, was killed in a tragic vehicle accident on Monday, April 23, 2012. Logan was a U.S. Marine and an Iraq War combat veteran. Lance attended Festus high school. Benoist also has a sister.

== See also ==
- List of male mixed martial artists
