= UFC on FX: Alves vs. Kampmann =

UFC mixed martial arts event in 2012

- The poster for UFC on FX: Alves vs. Kampmann
- Promotion: Ultimate Fighting Championship
- Date: March 3, 2012
- Venue: Allphones Arena
- City: Sydney, Australia
- Attendance: 14,537
- Total gate: $2,200,000

Event chronology
UFC 144: Edgar vs. Henderson	UFC on FX: Alves vs. Kampmann	UFC on Fuel TV: Gustafsson vs. Silva

UFC on FX: Alves vs. Kampmann (also known as UFC on FX 2) was a mixed martial arts event held live by the Ultimate Fighting Championship on Saturday March 3, 2012 at the Allphones Arena in Sydney, Australia.

== Background ==
UFC on FX: Alves vs. Kampmann was the promotion's 200th event.

The event was the third UFC card to be held in Australia and the second to be televised on FX. Ticket sales for the event were slower than the two previous UFC events held in Australia, UFC 110 and UFC 127. These events led to record ticket-sales, with UFC 110 becoming the second fastest sell-out in UFC history and UFC 127 equaled the fastest sell-out (30 minutes). UFC on FX: Alves vs. Kampmann was the most successful "Fight Night" event in the company's history in terms of box office.

The event also made history by playing host the first ever flyweight fights in UFC history as part of the semifinals for the Flyweight Tournament, the winner of which would be crowned the inaugural UFC Flyweight Champion.

Jared Hamman was expected to face Kyle Noke at this event, but withdrew from the bout due to an injury. Noke instead faced promotional newcomer Andrew Craig.

Robbie Peralta was expected to rematch Mackens Semerzier at this event, but pulled out of the bout due to an injury. Semerzier instead faced Daniel Pineda.

== Scoring controversy ==
A stipulation put in place for the flyweight tournament stated that if any of the tournament fights were to end in a draw, a fourth "sudden death" round would take place. The Demetrious Johnson and Ian McCall fight went the distance and the Australian Athletic Commission collected and totaled the judges' score cards. The fight was announced as a majority decision win for Johnson. However, upon reviewing the point totals later in the evening, the athletic commission discovered that they had added up the judges' score cards incorrectly and that the fight should have been declared a majority draw and resulted in a fourth round. The athletic commission informed UFC officials of the error and at the post-fight press conference Dana White announced that both fighters were made aware of the situation, that the Flyweight Tournament fight between Johnson and McCall had been scored incorrectly, and that fight did indeed end in a majority draw. The error was corrected and the majority decision win for Johnson was overturned, but the previously announced fourth round tie breaker could not be fought. Johnson and McCall would be forced to repeat their fight, thus delaying the finish of the first round of the Flyweight Tournament. Johnson and McCall would face each other again three months later at UFC on FX 3.

== Results ==
Main Card (FX)
Weight class				Method	Round	Time	Notes
Welterweight	Martin Kampmann	def.	Thiago Alves	Submission (guillotine choke)	3	4:12
Flyweight	Joseph Benavidez	def.	Yasuhiro Urushitani	TKO (punches)	2	0:11	(Note: Flyweight Tournament Semifinal bout)
Flyweight	Demetrious Johnson	vs.	Ian McCall	Draw (majority) (28–28, 29–29, 29–28)	3	5:00	(Note: Flyweight Tournament Semifinal bout)
Middleweight	Costas Philippou	def.	Court McGee	Decision (unanimous) (29–28, 29–28, 29–28)	3	5:00
Preliminary Card (Fuel TV)
Light Heavyweight	James Te Huna	def.	Aaron Rosa	TKO (punches)	1	2:08
Light Heavyweight	Anthony Perosh	def.	Nick Penner	TKO (punches)	1	4:59
Featherweight	Steven Siler	def.	Cole Miller	Decision (unanimous) (29–28, 29–28, 29–28)	3	5:00
Middleweight	Andrew Craig	def.	Kyle Noke	Decision (unanimous) (29–28, 29–28, 29–28)	3	5:00
Welterweight	TJ Waldburger	def.	Jake Hecht	Submission (armbar)	1	0:55
Featherweight	Daniel Pineda	def.	Mackens Semerzier	Submission (armbar)	1	2:05
Preliminary Card (Facebook)
Heavyweight	Shawn Jordan	def.	Oli Thompson	TKO (knees and punches)	2	1:07

== Flyweight Championship bracket ==
Semifinals; UFC on FX 2 / UFC on FX 3
(United States)	Joseph Benavidez	TKO
(Japan)	Yasuhiro Urushitani	2
(United States)	Demetrious Johnson^{1}	UD
(United States)	Ian McCall	3

Finals; UFC 152
(United States)	Joseph Benavidez	5
(United States)	Demetrious Johnson	SD

^{1} The initial semifinal bout between Johnson and McCall at UFC on FX 2 ended in a draw. Johnson defeated McCall in a rematch at UFC on FX 3.

== Bonus awards ==
The following fighters received $50,000 bonuses.

- Fight of the Night: Demetrious Johnson vs. Ian McCall
- Knockout of the Night: Joseph Benavidez
- Submission of the Night: Martin Kampmann

== See also ==
- 2012 in UFC
- List of UFC events
- Mixed martial arts in Australia
