= Brad Tavares =

American mixed martial artist (born 1987)

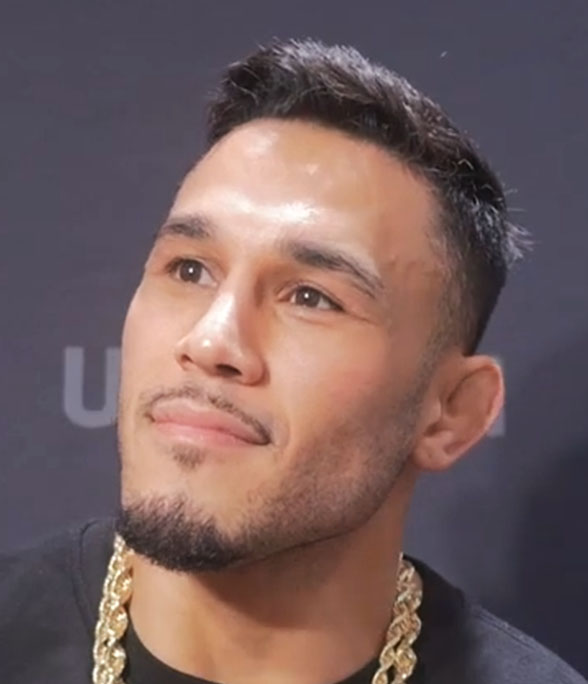
- Tavares at UFC 244 in New York City in November 2019
- Born: Bradley Kaipo Sarbida Tavares; December 21, 1987 (age 38); Kailua, Hawaii, U.S.
- Height: 5 ft 11 in (180 cm)
- Weight: 185 lb (84 kg; 13.2 st)
- Division: Middleweight
- Reach: 74 in (188 cm)
- Fighting out of: Las Vegas, Nevada, U.S.
- Team: Xtreme Couture
- Years active: 2007–present

Mixed martial arts record
- Total: 33
- Wins: 21
- By knockout: 5
- By submission: 2
- By decision: 14
- Losses: 12
- By knockout: 6
- By decision: 6

Other information
- Website: bradtavares.com
- Mixed martial arts record from Sherdog

Bradley Kaipo Sarbida Tavares (born December 21, 1987) is an American professional mixed martial artist who competes in the Middleweight division of the Ultimate Fighting Championship (UFC). A professional since 2007, Tavares fought in regional promotions before joining the UFC's The Ultimate Fighter 11 in 2010.

== High school career ==
Tavares excelled in high school athletics at Waiakea High School competing in football and in track and field. After high school, he worked as a ramp agent for Hawaiian Airlines. He was 19 when he first fought as a professional.

== Mixed martial arts career ==
=== Early career ===
Tavares started his MMA career in 2007 in his home state of Hawaii, compiling a record of 5–0, with three technical knockouts and two submission wins. He originally started training with Universal Combat Sports in Pearl City, Hawaii, where he competed In Got Skills, then fought his first MMA match in Farrington High School in Kalihi where he got a first-round KO, there he got approached by MMAD to train there, MMAD (Mixed Martial Arts Development) ran by the likes of Randy Leuder, Brandon Wolff (UFC), and Rob Hesia. He still returns home to Hawaii to train with HQ MMA when not training at Xtreme Couture in Las Vegas.

=== The Ultimate Fighter 11 ===
In March 2010, Tavares was announced as part of the eleventh season of The Ultimate Fighter. In the elimination round, Tavares defeated Jordan Smith via KO (knee) after less than a minute. He was selected fifth by Team Liddell and tenth overall.

Tavares then defeated James Hammortree in the second preliminary fight. After two rounds, the fight was declared a draw and the fighters went to a third round. Tavares took control in the third round and was declared the winner, advancing him into the quarter finals.

In the quarter-finals, Tavares fought Seth Baczynski. As the first round ended, Baczynski threw an illegal soccer kick to the head of Tavares. Baczynski immediately apologized, knowing he could have seriously hurt Tavares, who went to his corner and slumped. After discussing the matter with the doctors, Herb Dean stopped the fight and Tavares was declared the winner by disqualification, advancing him to the semi-finals.

In the semi-finals, Tavares faced teammate Court McGee, for a place in the live final. After a fairly even first two rounds, Tavares was rocked late in the third. McGee then locked in a rear naked choke, handing Tavares his first loss.

=== Ultimate Fighting Championship ===
==== 2010–2011 ====
At The Ultimate Fighter: Team Liddell vs. Team Ortiz Finale, Tavares had a rematch with Seth Baczynski. Tavares defeated Baczynski via unanimous decision.

Tavares next faced UFC veteran Phil Baroni on January 1, 2011, at UFC 125. He won the fight via KO in the first round.

Tavares faced Aaron Simpson on July 2, 2011, at UFC 132, replacing Jason Miller, who was removed from the card. He lost the fight via unanimous decision.

Tavares was expected to face Tim Credeur on October 29, 2011, at UFC 137. However, Creduer was forced out of the bout, and he was replaced by promotional newcomer Dustin Jacoby. Unfortunately, Tavares was pulled out of the newly made fight due to an injury, setting up a fight between Jacoby and fellow UFC newcomer Clifford Starks.

==== 2012 ====
Tavares fought Yang Dongi on May 15, 2012, at UFC on Fuel TV: The Korean Zombie vs. Poirier. Tavares won a closely contested fight via unanimous decision (29–28, 29–28, 29–28).

Tavares next defeated former BAMMA middleweight champion and UFC newcomer Tom Watson via split decision on at UFC on Fuel TV: Struve vs. Miocic.

==== 2013 ====
Tavares faced Riki Fukuda on March 3, 2013, at UFC on Fuel TV 8 and won via unanimous decision.

Tavares faced Robert McDaniel on August 28, 2013, at UFC Fight Night 27. He won the fight via unanimous decision.

==== 2014 ====
Tavares faced Lorenz Larkin on January 15, 2014, at UFC Fight Night 35. He won the fight via unanimous decision.

Tavares faced Yoel Romero at UFC on Fox 11. He lost the fight via unanimous decision, ending his five-fight win streak.

Tavares next faced Tim Boetsch on August 16, 2014, at UFC Fight Night 47. He lost the fight via TKO in the second round, marking the first time Tavares had been stopped as a professional.

==== 2015 ====
Tavares faced Nate Marquardt on January 3, 2015, at UFC 182. He won the fight by unanimous decision.

Tavares faced Robert Whittaker on May 10, 2015, at UFC Fight Night 65. He lost the fight via knockout in the first round.

==== 2016 ====
Tavares was very briefly linked to a bout with Thales Leites on August 6, 2016, at UFC Fight Night 92. However, Tavares was forced out of the fight with a rib injury, and he was replaced by Chris Camozzi.

Tavares returned to face Caio Magalhães on September 10, 2016, at UFC 203. He was awarded a split decision victory.

==== 2017 ====
Tavares was expected to face Héctor Lombard on January 28, 2017, at UFC on Fox 23. However, the bout was scrapped on January 10 due to undisclosed reasons.

Tavares faced Elias Theodorou on July 7, 2017, at The Ultimate Fighter 25 Finale. He won the fight by unanimous decision.

Tavares faced Thales Leites on October 7, 2017, at UFC 216. He won the fight by unanimous decision.

==== 2018 ====
Tavares faced Krzysztof Jotko on April 14, 2018, at UFC on Fox 29. He won the fight via technical knockout in round three.

Tavares faced Israel Adesanya on July 6, 2018, at The Ultimate Fighter 27 Finale. He lost the fight via unanimous decision.

==== 2019 ====
Tavares was expected to face Ian Heinisch on October 26, 2019, at UFC Fight Night 162 However, Heinisch withdrew from the bout, leading Tavares to replace Krzysztof Jotko against Edmen Shahbazyan at UFC 244 on November 2, 2019. He lost the fight via knockout in the first round.

==== 2020–2023 ====
Tavares was scheduled to face Antônio Carlos Júnior on March 14, 2020, at UFC Fight Night 170. However, Tavares was forced to pull out of the fight due to an anterior cruciate ligament (ACL) injury. The bout with Antônio Carlos Júnior was rescheduled for on January 24, 2021 at UFC 257. Tavares won the fight via unanimous decision.

Tavares faced Omari Akhmedov on July 10, 2021, at UFC 264. He won the fight via split decision.

Tavares was scheduled to face Brendan Allen on December 4, 2021, at UFC on ESPN 31. He eventually pulled out in mid November and was replaced by Roman Dolidze.

Tavares next faced Dricus du Plessis at UFC 276 on July 2, 2022. He lost the fight via unanimous decision.

Tavares was scheduled to face Gregory Rodrigues on January 21, 2023, at UFC 283. However, Tavares withdrawn from the bout due to an injury.

Tavares to faced Bruno Silva on April 22, 2023, at UFC Fight Night 222. He lost the fight via technical knockout in the first round.

Tavares faced former UFC Middleweight Champion Chris Weidman at UFC 292 on August 19, 2023. He won the fight via unanimous decision.

==== 2024 ====
Tavares faced Gregory Rodrigues on February 10, 2024, at UFC Fight Night 236. In a back-and-forth fight, Tavares ended up losing by technical knockout in the third round.

Tavares was scheduled to face Jun Yong Park on July 20, 2024, at UFC on ESPN 60. However, the bout was scrapped after the weigh-ins when Park was not medically cleared to compete. The bout was rescheduled to take place on October 12, 2024, at UFC Fight Night 244. Tavares lost the fight via split decision.

==== 2025 ====
Tavares faced Gerald Meerschaert on April 5, 2025, at UFC on ESPN 65. Via unanimous decision, Tavares won his 16th middleweight bout, which ties the record with Michael Bisping for most wins in UFC middleweight history.

On May 3, 2025, it was reported that Tavares was removed from the UFC roster. However, on May 14, Tavares stated that he had signed a new contract with the UFC.

Tavares faced Robert Bryczek on September 6, 2025, at UFC Fight Night 258. He lost the fight by technical knockout in the third round.

==== 2026 ====
Tavares faced Eryk Anders on March 14, 2026, at UFC Fight Night 269. He lost the fight by unanimous decision.

Tavares was scheduled to face Marc-André Barriault on July 18, 2026 at UFC Fight Night 281. However, Tavares pulled out due to undisclosed reasons, so the bout was cancelled.

== Championships and accomplishments ==
=== Mixed martial arts ===
- Ultimate Fighting Championship
  - Tied (Michael Bisping) for most wins in UFC middleweight division history (16)
  - Most bouts in UFC Middleweight division history (28)
    - Most bouts in UFC history without a Post-Fight bonus (28)
  - Most fight time in UFC Middleweight division history (6:04:18)
  - Most decision wins in UFC Middleweight division history (14)
    - Tied (Neil Magny) for most decision wins in UFC history (14)
    - Most decision bouts in UFC Middleweight division history (20)
    - Most unanimous decision wins in UFC Middleweight division history (11)
    - Tied (Rafael dos Anjos, Belal Muhammad & Kamaru Usman) for second most unanimous decision wins in UFC history (11)
    - Tied (Krzysztof Jotko & Sean Strickland) for most split decision wins in UFC Middleweight division history (3)
  - Fourth most significant strikes landed in UFC Middleweight division history (1243)
    - Fifth most total strikes landed in UFC Middleweight division history (1525)
  - Tied (Clay Guida) for fifth most decision bouts in UFC history (20)
  - Seventh highest decision wins per win percentage in UFC history (14 decision wins / 16 overall wins: 87.5%)

== Mixed martial arts record ==
Professional record breakdown
33 matches	21 wins	12 losses
By knockout	5	6
By submission	2	0
By decision	14	6

Res.	Record	Opponent	Method	Event	Date	Round	Time	Location	Notes
Loss	21–12	Eryk Anders	Decision (unanimous)	UFC Fight Night: Emmett vs. Vallejos	March 14, 2026	3	5:00	Las Vegas, Nevada, United States	
Loss	21–11	Robert Bryczek	TKO (punches)	UFC Fight Night: Imavov vs. Borralho	September 6, 2025	3	1:43	Paris, France	
Win	21–10	Gerald Meerschaert	Decision (unanimous)	UFC on ESPN: Emmett vs. Murphy	April 5, 2025	3	5:00	Las Vegas, Nevada, United States	
Loss	20–10	Park Jun-yong	Decision (split)	UFC Fight Night: Royval vs. Taira	October 12, 2024	3	5:00	Las Vegas, Nevada, United States	
Loss	20–9	Gregory Rodrigues	TKO (punches)	UFC Fight Night: Hermansson vs. Pyfer	February 10, 2024	3	0:55	Las Vegas, Nevada, United States	
Win	20–8	Chris Weidman	Decision (unanimous)	UFC 292	August 19, 2023	3	5:00	Boston, Massachusetts, United States	
Loss	19–8	Bruno Silva	TKO (knee and punch)	UFC Fight Night: Pavlovich vs. Blaydes	April 22, 2023	1	3:35	Las Vegas, Nevada, United States	
Loss	19–7	Dricus du Plessis	Decision (unanimous)	UFC 276	July 2, 2022	3	5:00	Las Vegas, Nevada, United States	
Win	19–6	Omari Akhmedov	Decision (split)	UFC 264	July 10, 2021	3	5:00	Las Vegas, Nevada, United States	
Win	18–6	Antônio Carlos Júnior	Decision (unanimous)	UFC 257	January 24, 2021	3	5:00	Abu Dhabi, United Arab Emirates	
Loss	17–6	Edmen Shahbazyan	KO (head kick)	UFC 244	November 2, 2019	1	2:27	New York City, New York, United States	
Loss	17–5	Israel Adesanya	Decision (unanimous)	The Ultimate Fighter: Undefeated Finale	July 6, 2018	5	5:00	Las Vegas, Nevada, United States	
Win	17–4	Krzysztof Jotko	TKO (punches)	UFC on Fox: Poirier vs. Gaethje	April 14, 2018	3	2:16	Glendale, Arizona, United States	
Win	16–4	Thales Leites	Decision (unanimous)	UFC 216	October 7, 2017	3	5:00	Las Vegas, Nevada, United States	
Win	15–4	Elias Theodorou	Decision (unanimous)	The Ultimate Fighter: Redemption Finale	July 7, 2017	3	5:00	Las Vegas, Nevada, United States	
Win	14–4	Caio Magalhães	Decision (split)	UFC 203	September 10, 2016	3	5:00	Cleveland, Ohio, United States	
Loss	13–4	Robert Whittaker	KO (punches)	UFC Fight Night: Miocic vs. Hunt	May 10, 2015	1	0:44	Adelaide, Australia	
Win	13–3	Nate Marquardt	Decision (unanimous)	UFC 182	January 3, 2015	3	5:00	Las Vegas, Nevada, United States	
Loss	12–3	Tim Boetsch	TKO (punches)	UFC Fight Night: Bader vs. Saint Preux	August 16, 2014	2	3:18	Bangor, Maine, United States	
Loss	12–2	Yoel Romero	Decision (unanimous)	UFC on Fox: Werdum vs. Browne	April 19, 2014	3	5:00	Orlando, Florida, United States	
Win	12–1	Lorenz Larkin	Decision (unanimous)	UFC Fight Night: Rockhold vs. Philippou	January 15, 2014	3	5:00	Duluth, Georgia, United States	
Win	11–1	Robert McDaniel	Decision (unanimous)	UFC Fight Night: Condit vs. Kampmann 2	August 28, 2013	3	5:00	Indianapolis, Indiana, United States	
Win	10–1	Riki Fukuda	Decision (unanimous)	UFC on Fuel TV: Silva vs. Stann	March 3, 2013	3	5:00	Saitama, Japan	
Win	9–1	Tom Watson	Decision (split)	UFC on Fuel TV: Struve vs. Miocic	September 29, 2012	3	5:00	Nottingham, England	
Win	8–1	Yang Dong-yi	Decision (unanimous)	UFC on Fuel TV: The Korean Zombie vs. Poirier	May 15, 2012	3	5:00	Fairfax, Virginia, United States	
Loss	7–1	Aaron Simpson	Decision (unanimous)	UFC 132	July 2, 2011	3	5:00	Las Vegas, Nevada, United States	
Win	7–0	Phil Baroni	KO (knees and punches)	UFC 125	January 1, 2011	1	4:20	Las Vegas, Nevada, United States	
Win	6–0	Seth Baczynski	Decision (unanimous)	The Ultimate Fighter: Team Liddell vs. Team Ortiz Finale	June 19, 2010	3	5:00	Las Vegas, Nevada, United States	
Win	5–0	Jonathan João	TKO (punches)	X-1: Temple of Boom 4	March 7, 2009	1	N/A	Honolulu, Hawaii, United States	
Win	4–0	Joshua Ferreira	Submission (rear-naked choke)	X-1: Temple of Boom 1	September 27, 2008	2	2:28	Honolulu, Hawaii, United States	
Win	3–0	Devin Kauwe	TKO (punches)	Icon Sport: Hard Times	August 2, 2008	1	1:52	Honolulu, Hawaii, United States	
Win	2–0	John Ferrel	Submission (rear-naked choke)	Niko Vitale Promotions: Local Pride	April 18, 2008	1	0:18	Honolulu, Hawaii, United States	
Win	1–0	Thomas Sedano	TKO (punches)	MMA Contenders Conflict: The Beginning	June 29, 2007	1	0:40	Honolulu, Hawaii, United States	Middleweight debut.

== Mixed martial arts exhibition record ==
Exhibition record breakdown		
4 matches	3 wins	1 loss
By knockout	1	0
By submission	0	1
By decision	1	0
By disqualification	1	0

Res.	Record	Opponent	Method	Event	Date	Round	Time	Location	Notes
Loss	3–1	Court McGee	Submission (rear-naked choke)	The Ultimate Fighter: Team Liddell vs. Team Ortiz	Mar 2, 2010	3	4:48	Las Vegas, Nevada, United States	The Ultimate Fighter 11 Semi-final round.
Win	3–0	Seth Baczynski	DQ (illegal knee)	The Ultimate Fighter: Team Liddell vs. Team Ortiz	Feb 23, 2010	1	5:00	Las Vegas, Nevada, United States	The Ultimate Fighter 11 Quarterfinal round.
Win	2–0	James Hammortree	Decision (unanimous)	The Ultimate Fighter: Team Liddell vs. Team Ortiz	Feb 1, 2010	3	5:00	Las Vegas, Nevada, United States	The Ultimate Fighter 11 Preliminary round.
Win	1–0	Jordan Smith	KO (knee)	The Ultimate Fighter: Team Liddell vs. Team Ortiz	Jan 23, 2010	1	0:45	Las Vegas, Nevada, United States	The Ultimate Fighter 11 Elimination round.

== See also ==
- List of current UFC fighters
- List of male mixed martial artists
