= Justin Edwards (fighter) =

American martial artist (born 1983)

- Born: Justin Ross Edwards; January 26, 1983 (age 43); Mansfield, Ohio, United States
- Other names: Fast Eddy
- Height: 5 ft 10 in (1.78 m)
- Weight: 170 lb (77 kg; 12 st)
- Division: Lightweight; Welterweight
- Reach: 70 in (180 cm)
- Fighting out of: Bellefontaine, Ohio, United States
- Team: American Top Team
- Rank: Black belt in Brazilian Jiu-Jitsu
- Years active: 2006–present

Mixed martial arts record
- Total: 17
- Wins: 10
- By knockout: 1
- By submission: 8
- By decision: 1
- Losses: 7
- By knockout: 3
- By submission: 1
- By decision: 3

Amateur record
- Total: 7
- Wins: 5
- By knockout: 3
- By submission: 3
- Losses: 2
- By submission: 1
- By decision: 1

Other information
- Mixed martial arts record from Sherdog

Justin Ross Edwards (born January 26, 1983) is an American mixed martial artist currently competing in the Lightweight division. A professional MMA competitor since 2008, Edwards has also formerly competed for the UFC, Bellator, and was a competitor on The Ultimate Fighter: Team Lesnar vs. Team dos Santos and The Ultimate Fighter: Redemption.

== Background ==
Edwards grew up in Mansfield, Ohio, attending Madison High School. There he participated in football and wrestling. Edwards also did Greco-Roman wrestling that was not affiliated with his school. Upon graduating Edwards earned an athletic scholarship to play football at Urbana University in Urbana, Ohio. Edwards graduated with a Bachelor of Science degree majoring in Criminal Justice. After graduating college Edwards picked up rugby until his work schedule wouldn't allow him to play.

== Mixed martial arts career ==
=== Background ===
Edwards started training MMA in 2006 after seeing an MMA fight on television, and began training at a local gym the following day. In October 2006, Edwards made his amateur debut, winning via submission. He won his next five amateur fights, holding an undefeated 6–0 record before losing three straight fights and then deciding to go pro.

=== Early career ===
Edwards made his pro debut with a 30 second TKO win over Ultimate Fighter alumni, Josh Rafferty. His next bout took place at Bellator 5 against veteran John Troyer. Edwards won the fight via submission towards the end of round one. He then entered a one night tournament for the International Fighting Championship, winning the tournament with wins over Davarius Scaife and Daniel Stittgen – both via first round submission. Edwards won two more fights before appearing on The Ultimate Fighter.

=== The Ultimate Fighter ===
In 2011, Edwards had signed with the UFC to compete in The Ultimate Fighter: Team Lesnar vs. Team dos Santos.

Edwards was flown in as a replacement fighter for Keon Caldwell, making Edwards a member of Team dos Santos. He had his first fight against eventual winner Tony Ferguson. Edwards lost after Ferguson threw an upkick that knocked him unconscious. He was set to appear in the wildcard round but was suspended 90 days and could not compete.

=== Ultimate Fighting Championship ===
After losing in the preliminary round, Edwards remained signed after the show. He made his official UFC debut June 4, 2011, on The Ultimate Fighter 13 Finale card, fighting against castmate, Clay Harvison. He lost the fight via split decision.

Edwards faced highly-touted prospect and Wand Fight Team product, Jorge Lopez, on September 17, 2011, at UFC Fight Night 25. He won the fight via unanimous decision.

Edwards stepped in to fight newly-signed Englishman, John Maguire, at UFC 138 in Birmingham, England, following the withdrawal of James Head due to injury. After being taken down and controlled for most of the fight, Edwards lost via unanimous decision (30–27, 30–27, 30–27).

Edwards was expected to face Mike Stumpf on February 4, 2012, at UFC 143. However, Stumpf suffered an undisclosed injury and was replaced by Stephen Thompson. Edwards was also forced to pull out of the bout and was replaced by Dan Stittgen.

Edwards faced Josh Neer on October 5, 2012, at UFC on FX 5. Edwards leaped into an arm in guillotine and finished the fight 45 seconds into the first round via technical submission after choking Neer unconscious. The finish won him Submission of the Night honors.

Edwards was expected to face Gunnar Nelson on February 16, 2013, at UFC on Fuel TV: Barao vs. McDonald. However, Edwards was forced to pull out of the bout citing an injury, and was replaced by returning veteran Jorge Santiago.

Edwards faced promotional newcomer Brandon Thatch on August 28, 2013, at UFC Fight Night 27. He lost the bout via first round TKO.

Edwards faced Ramsey Nijem in a Lightweight bout on January 15, 2014, at UFC Fight Night 35. He lost the fight via unanimous decision.

Edwards was expected to face Yancy Medeiros on August 30, 2014, at UFC 177. However, Edwards pulled out of the event in the days leading up to the event citing an injury. Medeiros ended up fighting promotional newcomer Damon Jackson.

Edwards faced Joe Proctor on June 6, 2015, at UFC Fight Night 68. He lost the back-and-forth fight via submission with just seconds remaining in the final round. Subsequently, he was released from the promotion.

=== The Ultimate Fighter: Redemption ===
In February 2017, it was revealed that Edwards would again compete on the UFC's reality show in the 25th season on The Ultimate Fighter: Redemption. Edwards was the seventh pick overall for Team Garbrandt. He defeated Joe Stevenson in the opening round by unanimous decision. In the quarter-finals Edwards lost to Tom Gallicchio by submission in the first round.

== Championships and accomplishments ==
- International Fighting Championships
  - IFC Grandprix Winner (2009)
- Ultimate Fighting Championship
  - Submission of the Night (One time) vs. Josh Neer

== Mixed martial arts record ==
Professional record breakdown
17 matches	10 wins	7 losses
By knockout	1	3
By submission	8	1
By decision	1	3

Res.	Record	Opponent	Method	Event	Date	Round	Time	Location	Notes
Loss	10–7	Willis Black	TKO (punches)	WXC 79: Warrior Wednesday 4	July 3, 2019	1	0:47	Southgate, Michigan, United States	
Win	10–6	Carlo Prater	Submission (guillotine choke)	Premier Fighting Championship 9	August 11, 2018	3	1:44	Covington, Kentucky, United States	Welterweight bout.
Loss	9–6	Devonte Smith	KO (punch)	Alliance MMA at the Arnold Sports Festival	March 3, 2018	1	1:30	Columbus, Ohio, United States	Lightweight bout.
Win	9–5	Cody Pahan	Submission (guillotine choke)	Fight Night at the Island: Saunders vs. Volkmann	September 9, 2016	1	1:24	Welch, Minnesota, United States	Return to Welterweight.
Loss	8–5	Joe Proctor	Technical Submission (guillotine choke)	UFC Fight Night: Boetsch vs. Henderson	June 6, 2015	3	4:58	New Orleans, Louisiana, United States	
Loss	8–4	Ramsey Nijem	Decision (unanimous)	UFC Fight Night: Rockhold vs. Philippou	January 15, 2014	3	5:00	Duluth, Georgia, United States	Lightweight debut.
Loss	8–3	Brandon Thatch	TKO (knees and punches)	UFC Fight Night: Condit vs. Kampmann 2	August 28, 2013	1	1:23	Indianapolis, Indiana, United States	
Win	8–2	Josh Neer	Technical Submission (guillotine choke)	UFC on FX: Browne vs. Bigfoot	October 5, 2012	1	0:45	Minneapolis, Minnesota, United States	Submission of the Night.
Loss	7–2	John Maguire	Decision (unanimous)	UFC 138	November 5, 2011	3	5:00	Birmingham, England	
Win	7–1	Jorge Lopez	Decision (unanimous)	UFC Fight Night: Shields vs. Ellenberger	September 17, 2011	3	5:00	New Orleans, Louisiana, United States	
Loss	6–1	Clay Harvison	Decision (split)	The Ultimate Fighter 13 Finale	June 4, 2011	3	5:00	Las Vegas, Nevada, United States	
Win	6–0	Marcus Ajian	Submission (guillotine choke)	CNG Promotions: Queen City Meltdown	June 26, 2010	1	0:40	Cincinnati, Ohio, United States	
Win	5–0	Tony Parker	Submission (guillotine choke)	Extreme IT Challenge	April 10, 2010	1	1:20	Findlay, Ohio, United States	
Win	4–0	Dan Stittgen	Submission (guillotine choke)	IFC: Wiuff vs. Newcomb	January 8, 2010	1	0:37	Green Bay, Wisconsin, United States	IFC Grand Prix Final.
Win	3–0	Davarius Scaife	Submission (armbar)	IFC: Wiuff vs. Newcomb	January 8, 2010	1	0:48	Green Bay, Wisconsin, United States	IFC Grand Prix Semifinal.
Win	2–0	John Troyer	Submission (guillotine choke)	Bellator 5	May 1, 2009	1	4:12	Dayton, Ohio, United States	
Win	1–0	Josh Rafferty	TKO (punches)	Extreme Challenge 111	November 21, 2008	1	0:30	Elizabeth, Indiana, United States	Welterweight debut.

== Mixed martial arts exhibition record ==
Professional record breakdown
3 matches	1 win	2 losses
By knockout	0	1
By submission	0	1
By decision	1	0

Res.	Record	Opponent	Method	Event	Date	Round	Time	Location	Notes
Loss	1–2	Tom Gallicchio	Submission (rear-naked choke)	The Ultimate Fighter: Redemption	June 7, 2017 (airdate)	1		Las Vegas, Nevada, United States	The Ultimate Fighter: Redemption Quarterfinals round
Win	1–1	Joe Stevenson	Decision (unanimous)	The Ultimate Fighter: Redemption	May 31, 2017 (airdate)	2	5:00	Las Vegas, Nevada, United States	The Ultimate Fighter: Redemption Preliminary round
Loss	0–1	Tony Ferguson	KO (upkick)	The Ultimate Fighter 13	May 4, 2011 (airdate)	1	3:56	Las Vegas, Nevada, United States	The Ultimate Fighter 13 Preliminary round

== Amateur mixed martial arts record ==
Professional record breakdown
14 matches	12 wins	2 losses
By knockout	5	0
By submission	7	1
By decision	0	1

Res.	Record	Opponent	Method	Event	Date	Round	Time	Location	Notes
Loss	6–2	Mickey Hughes	Submission (armbar)	NAAFS: Columbus Night of Pain 4	September 19, 2008	1	2:22	Columbus, Ohio, United States	
Loss	6–1	Konstandinos Angelas	Decision (split)	ICFA: Shamrock Showdown	March 14, 2008	3	3:00	Columbus, Ohio, United States	
Win	6–0	Troy Miller	Submission (rear-naked choke)	CSB 2: Caged Super Brawl 2	February 16, 2008	1	2:25	Celina, Ohio, United States	
Win	5–0	Jason Koehler	TKO (punches)	NOTW: Night of the Warrior	November 17, 2007	1	0:35	Dayton, Ohio, United States	
Win	4–0	Sean Lewis	TKO (punches)	NOTW: Night of the Warrior	September 29, 2007	1	0:30	Dayton, Ohio, United States	
Win	3–0	Joe Camacho	Submission (armbar)	Iron Tiger Challenge 3	May 19, 2007	1	1:32	Bellefontaine, Ohio, United States	
Win	2–0	Chad Smith	TKO (punches)	MFC 6: Mega Fighting Championship	January 27, 2007	1	0:23	Bellefontaine, Ohio, United States	
Win	1–0	Dusty Jones	Submission (rear-naked choke)	MFC 4: Mega Fighting Championship	October 7, 2006	3	2:11	London, Ohio, United States	

== See also ==
- List of current UFC fighters
- List of male mixed martial artists
