= Seth Baczynski =

American mixed martial artist (born 1981)

- Born: Seth Baczynski; November 26, 1981 (age 44); Lihue, Hawaii, United States
- Other names: The Polish Pistola
- Height: 6 ft 3 in (1.91 m)
- Weight: 170 lb (77 kg; 12 st)
- Division: Light Heavyweight; Middleweight; Welterweight
- Reach: 76 in (193 cm)
- Fighting out of: Apache Junction, Arizona, United States
- Team: Power MMA and Fitness
- Rank: Blue belt in Brazilian Jiu-Jitsu under Francisco "Kiko" France
- Years active: 2006–2021

Mixed martial arts record
- Total: 40
- Wins: 22
- By knockout: 9
- By submission: 11
- By decision: 2
- Losses: 18
- By knockout: 5
- By submission: 7
- By decision: 6

Other information
- Mixed martial arts record from Sherdog

Seth Baczynski (born October 26, 1981) is an American former professional mixed martial arts fighter who competed in the Middleweight division. Baczynski has formerly competed for the UFC, and was a cast member of Spike TV's The Ultimate Fighter: Team Liddell vs. Team Ortiz and The Ultimate Fighter: Redemption. He has also fought for top promotions such as the International Fight League, Tachi Palace Fights, World Lethwei Championship, and the Legacy Fighting Alliance.

== Background ==
Baczynski was born in Honolulu, Hawaii and raised in Apache Junction, Arizona. His paternal great-grandfather was an immigrant from Poland. He played football and basketball growing up. Upon graduating from Apache Junction High School, Baczynski began training in mixed martial arts.

== Mixed martial arts career ==
=== Early career ===
Baczynski began fighting in 2006, making his debut at a Rage in the Cage event. Baczynski lost the fight to Shane Johnson via kneebar submission in round one. He bounced back from the loss and won three straight fights, all for the same promotion.

=== International Fight League ===
He then signed a contract with the International Fight League. He debuted for the promotion against Brent Beauparlant, losing via decision. He was given a second chance, and fought Dan Molina. Baczynski lost the fight and was subsequently released from the promotion.

=== Post-IFL ===
Baczynski obtained a 7–1 record after being released from the IFL. He then fought up and comer Roger Bowling, losing by vicious KO only nine seconds into round one. Baczynski won a fight against Tom Nguyen at a Wild Bill's Fight Night event. He was then selected to be a part of The Ultimate Fighter.

=== The Ultimate Fighter ===
Baczynski was selected as one of the 28 competitors for the eleventh season of the Ultimate Fighter. To get onto the show and become one of the 14 fighters, Baczynski had to fight Court McGee. After three rounds, the judges awarded the win to McGee, sending Baczynski home.

After a fighter was injured and forced out of the competition, Baczynski was given the injured fighter's spot. In his first fight back he fought Team Liddell's last pick, Joseph Henle. Baczynski won the fight via three round unanimous decision and moved onto the quarter-final round.

In the quarter-final round, Baczynski faced rival team member and friend Brad Tavares. As the first round ended, Baczynski threw an illegal soccer kick to the head of Tavares. Baczynski immediately apologized, knowing he could have seriously hurt Tavares, who went to his corner and slumped. After discussing the matter with the doctors, Herb Dean stopped the fight and Tavares was declared the winner by disqualification, advancing him to the semi-finals.

In 2017, he returned to TUF 25, ultimately losing by unanimous decision to Gilbert Smith.

=== Ultimate Fighting Championship ===
Baczynski made his UFC debut in a rematch against Brad Tavares at The Ultimate Fighter: Team Liddell vs. Team Ortiz Finale. After three close rounds, Baczynski lost the fight via unanimous decision (29–28, 29–28, 29–28).

Due to his loss to Tavares, Baczynski was subsequently released from the UFC.

=== Post-UFC ===
Soon after being released from the UFC, Baczynski was reportedly signed by Strikeforce and was scheduled to make his promotional debut at ShoMMA 10: Riggs vs. Taylor against Erik Apple. However, Apple was forced to pull out of the fight and a replacement was not named.

He then fought UFC and WEC veteran, Tim McKenzie, at Tachi Palace Fights 7. The fight was ended after Baczynski escaped from a near fight ending armbar submission hold, which ended up breaking his arm, and knocked McKenzie out with elbows. McKenzie appealed the result to the CSAC.

On April 9, 2011, Baczynski became the Interim Ringside MMA Welterweight Champion when he TKO'd formerly undefeated prospect Alex Garcia at Ringside MMA 10.

=== Return to UFC ===
Baczynski returned to the UFC facing Clay Harvison on September 17, 2011, at UFC Fight Night 25, replacing an injured DaMarques Johnson. He won the fight via submission in the second round.

Baczynski again stepped-in on short notice to fight Matt Brown on November 19, 2011, at UFC 139. He won the fight via submission in the second round.

Baczynski fought Lance Benoist on June 8, 2012, at UFC on FX 3. Baczynski defeated Benoist via split decision.

Baczynski next faced Simeon Thoresen on September 22, 2012, at UFC 152. Baczynski was surprisingly being out struck by Thoresen throughout the fight until he landed a big punch that instantly knocked Thoresen out late in the first round.

Baczynski was expected to face Kyle Noke on December 15, 2012, at UFC on FX 6. However, Noke pulled out of the bout citing a shoulder injury and was replaced by Mike Pierce. He lost the fight via unanimous decision.

Baczynski fought promotional newcomer Brian Melancon on July 6, 2013, at UFC 162. He lost the fight via knockout due to ground and pound punches at the end of the first round.

Baczynski faced Neil Magny on November 6, 2013, at UFC Fight Night 31. He won the back-and-forth fight via unanimous decision.

Baczynski faced Thiago Alves on April 10, 2014, at UFC on Fox 11. He lost the fight via unanimous decision. Despite the loss, this fight earned Baczynski his first Fight of the Night bonus award.

Baczynski faced promotional newcomer Alan Jouban on August 16, 2014, at UFC Fight Night 47. He lost the back-and-forth fight via knockout in the first round. Despite the loss, Baczynski earned his second consecutive Fight of the Night bonus award.

Baczynski faced Leon Edwards on April 11, 2015, at UFC Fight Night 64. Baczynski lost the fight as he was quickly knocked out only 8 seconds into the first round, and was subsequently released from the promotion.

=== The Ultimate Fighter: Redemption ===
In February 2017, it was revealed that Baczynski would again compete on the UFC's reality show in the 25th season on The Ultimate Fighter: Redemption. Baczynski was the first pick overall for Team Garbrandt. He faced Gilbert Smith in the opening round and lost via unanimous decision.

=== Lethwei ===
On May 2, 2019, Baczynski signed a multi-fight deal with Myanmar-based Lethwei organization World Lethwei Championship. His debut was for the inaugural Cruiserweight World Lethwei Championship against Lethwei world champion Dave Leduc on August 2, 2019. Baczynski felt confident leading up to the fight because he had more fighting experience than Leduc. Baczynski lost the fight via knockout in the second round.

== Personal life ==
Baczynski is married and has five children. Aside from fighting, he has a job as a utilities worker.

== Championships and achievements ==
=== Mixed martial arts ===
- Ultimate Fighting Championship
  - Fight of the Night (Two times) vs. Thiago Alves, Alan Jouban
- Ringside MMA
  - Interim Ringside Welterweight Championship (One time)

=== Lethwei ===
- Lethwei World
  - 2019 Event of the Year headlined at WLC 9
- Spia Asia Awards
  - 2019 Best Sport Tourism Destination Campaign of the Year – Bronze headlined at WLC 9
- Asian Academy Awards
  - 2019 Best Sport Program – National Winner headlined at WLC 9

== Mixed martial arts record ==
Professional record breakdown
40 matches	22 wins	18 losses
By knockout	9	5
By submission	11	7
By decision	2	6

Res.	Record	Opponent	Method	Event	Date	Round	Time	Location	Notes
Loss	22–18	Jesse Taylor	Submission (rear-naked choke)	NWFA 1: Retribution	August 28, 2021	1	0:46	Bentonville, Arkansas, United States	Catchweight (195 lbs) bout.
Loss	22–17	Gerald Harris	Decision (unanimous)	C3 Fights 48	November 23, 2019	3	5:00	Newkirk, Oklahoma, United States	
Loss	22–16	Daniel Madrid	Submission (guillotine choke)	LFA 59	February 1, 2019	1	2:54	Phoenix, Arizona, United States	
Loss	22–15	Teddy Ash	TKO (punches)	Unified MMA 34: Supremacy	September 28, 2018	5	4:58	Enoch, Alberta, Canada	For the vacant Unified MMA Middleweight Championship.
Win	22–14	Matt Lagler	KO (punches)	California Cage Wars 7: Outdoor Supershow	July 29, 2018	1	2:05	Campo, California, United States	
Win	21–14	Marvin Babe	Submission	C3 Fights 46: Clash at the Council	April 27, 2018	1	1:29	Newkirk, Oklahoma, United States	Return to Middleweight.
Win	20–14	Jonathan Casimiro	TKO (punches)	WFF MX: World Fighting Federation Mexico	October 15, 2016	2	4:15	Puerto Penasco, Sonora, Mexico	
Loss	19–14	Jesse Taylor	Decision (unanimous)	TFE MMA: Vengeance	August 26, 2016	3	5:00	Anaheim, California, United States	
Loss	19–13	Leon Edwards	KO (punches)	UFC Fight Night: Gonzaga vs. Cro Cop 2	April 11, 2015	1	0:08	Kraków, Poland	
Loss	19–12	Alan Jouban	KO (punch)	UFC Fight Night: Bader vs. St. Preux	August 16, 2014	1	4:33	Bangor, Maine, United States	Fight of the Night.
Loss	19–11	Thiago Alves	Decision (unanimous)	UFC on Fox: Werdum vs. Browne	April 19, 2014	3	5:00	Orlando, Florida, United States	Fight of the Night.
Win	19–10	Neil Magny	Decision (unanimous)	UFC: Fight for the Troops 3	November 6, 2013	3	5:00	Fort Campbell, Kentucky, United States	
Loss	18–10	Brian Melancon	KO (punches)	UFC 162	July 6, 2013	1	4:59	Las Vegas, Nevada, United States	
Loss	18–9	Mike Pierce	Decision (unanimous)	UFC on FX: Sotiropoulos vs. Pearson	December 15, 2012	3	5:00	Gold Coast, Australia	
Win	18–8	Simeon Thoresen	KO (punch)	UFC 152	September 22, 2012	1	4:10	Toronto, Ontario, Canada	
Win	17–8	Lance Benoist	Decision (split)	UFC on FX: Johnson vs. McCall	June 8, 2012	3	5:00	Sunrise, Florida United States	
Win	16–8	Matt Brown	Submission (guillotine choke)	UFC 139	November 19, 2011	2	0:42	San Jose, California United States	
Win	15–8	Clay Harvison	Submission (rear-naked choke)	UFC Fight Night: Shields vs. Ellenberger	September 17, 2011	2	1:12	New Orleans, Louisiana United States	
Win	14–8	Alex Garcia	KO (punches)	Ringside 10: Cote vs. Starnes	April 9, 2011	2	2:44	Montreal, Quebec, Canada	Won the interim Ringside Welterweight Championship.
Win	13–8	Tim McKenzie	TKO (elbows and punches)	Tachi Palace Fights 7	December 2, 2010	1	2:15	Lemoore, California, United States	Catchweight (174 lbs) bout.
Loss	12–8	Brad Tavares	Decision (unanimous)	The Ultimate Fighter 11 Finale	June 19, 2010	3	5:00	Las Vegas, Nevada, United States	Return to Middleweight.
Win	12–7	Tom Nguyen	Submission (guillotine choke)	Wild Bill's Fight Night 23	October 30, 2009	2	1:32	Duluth, Georgia, United States	
Loss	11–7	Roger Bowling	KO (punches)	MMA Big Show: Retribution	March 7, 2009	1	0:09	Vevay, Indiana, United States	For the MMA Big Show Welterweight Championship.
Win	11–6	James Warfield	KO (flying knee and punches)	Evolution MMA	October 4, 2008	1	1:21	Phoenix, Arizona, United States	
Win	10–6	Oscar Montano	Submission (triangle choke)	Mexican Fighting Championship	September 20, 2008	1	1:30	Puerto Penasco, Mexico	
Win	9–6	Antonio Grant	KO (punch)	Silver Crown Fights	August 8, 2008	1	0:11	Fort Wayne, Indiana, United States	
Loss	8–6	Donnie Liles	Submission (anaconda choke)	Warriors Collide 4	July 19, 2008	1	2:01	Colorado, United States	
Win	8–5	Eddie Arizmendi	Submission (triangle choke)	Rage in the Cage 111	June 7, 2008	2	2:03	Arizona, United States	
Win	7–5	Jordan Pergola	Submission (triangle choke)	XFC 3: Rage in the Cage	March 2, 2008	1	N/A	Tampa, Florida, United States	
Win	6–5	Kito Andrews	Submission (triangle choke)	Full Moon Fighting	February 23, 2008	3	3:50	Sonora, Mexico	Welterweight debut.
Win	5–5	Chris Kennedy	TKO (punches)	Tuff-N-Uff: Thompson vs. Troyer	February 1, 2008	1	2:50	Las Vegas, Nevada, United States	
Loss	4–5	Dan Molina	Submission (heel hook)	IFL: Las Vegas	June 16, 2007	1	1:32	Las Vegas, Nevada, United States	
Loss	4–4	Brent Beauparlant	Decision (unanimous)	IFL: Connecticut	April 13, 2007	3	4:00	Uncasville, Connecticut, United States	
Win	4–3	Seth Ballantine	Submission (armbar)	RITC 89: Triple Main Event	December 2, 2006	2	1:18	Scottsdale, Arizona, United States	
Win	3–3	Travos Degrout	Submission (choke)	RITC 84: Celebrity Theatre	July 1, 2006	1	N/A	Phoenix, Arizona, United States	Middleweight debut.
Win	2–3	Johnathan Tsosie	Submission (choke)	RITC 80: Fight Night at The Fort	March 18, 2006	1	1:32	Fountain Hills, Arizona, United States	
Loss	1–3	Shane Johnson	Submission (kneebar)	RITC 79: The Rage Returns	February 2, 2006	1	2:29	Tucson, Arizona, United States	
Loss	1–2	Gabriel Flores	Submission (choke)	RITC 76: Hello Tucson	November 11, 2005	3	1:56	Tucson, Arizona, United States	
Win	1–1	Robert King	TKO (retirement)	RITC 75: Friday Night Fights	September 30, 2005	1	0:35	Glendale, Arizona, United States	
Loss	0–1	Ryan Potter	Submission (choke)	RITC 73: Arizona vs. Nevada	August 6, 2005	1	1:18	Glendale, Arizona, United States	

== Lethwei record ==
Professional Lethwei record
0 wins (0 (T)KOs), 1 losses, 0 draws
Date	Result	Opponent	Event	Location	Method	Round	Time
2019-08-02	Loss	(Canada) Dave Leduc	WLC 9: King of Nine Limbs	Mandalay, Myanmar	KO	2	2:35
For the inaugural Cruiserweight World Lethwei Championship Title.
Legend: Win Loss Draw/No contest Notes

== Mixed martial arts exhibition record ==
Exhibition record breakdown		
4 matches	1 win	3 losses
By decision	1	2
By disqualification	0	1

Res.	Record	Opponent	Method	Event	Date	Round	Time	Location	Notes
Loss	1–3	Gilbert Smith	Decision (unanimous)	The Ultimate Fighter: Team Garbrandt vs Team Dillashaw	April 19, 2017	2	5:00	Las Vegas, Nevada, United States	The Ultimate Fighter 25 Preliminary round.
Loss	1–2	Brad Tavares	DQ (illegal knee)	The Ultimate Fighter: Team Liddell vs. Team Ortiz	Feb 23, 2010	1	5:00	Las Vegas, Nevada, United States	The Ultimate Fighter 11 Quarterfinal round.
Win	1–1	Joseph Henle	Decision (unanimous)	The Ultimate Fighter: Team Liddell vs. Team Ortiz	Feb 11, 2010	3	5:00	Las Vegas, Nevada, United States	The Ultimate Fighter 11 Preliminary round.
Loss	0–1	Court McGee	Decision (unanimous)	The Ultimate Fighter: Team Liddell vs. Team Ortiz	Jan 23, 2010	2	5:00	Las Vegas, Nevada, United States	The Ultimate Fighter 11 Elimination round. Later returned as an alternate.

== See also ==
- List of current UFC fighters
- List of male mixed martial artists
