= UFC Fight Night: Shields vs. Ellenberger =

UFC mixed martial arts event in 2011

- The poster for UFC Fight Night: Shields vs. Ellenberger
- Promotion: Ultimate Fighting Championship
- Date: September 17, 2011
- Venue: Morial Convention Center
- City: New Orleans, Louisiana
- Attendance: 7,112
- Total gate: $685,000

Event chronology
UFC 134: Silva vs. Okami	UFC Fight Night: Shields vs. Ellenberger	UFC 135: Jones vs. Rampage

UFC Fight Night: Shields vs. Ellenberger (also known as UFC Fight Night 25 or UFC Fight Night: Battle on the Bayou) was a mixed martial arts event held by the Ultimate Fighting Championship on September 17, 2011 at the Ernest N. Morial Convention Center in New Orleans, Louisiana.

== Background ==
The event was the seventh time that the organization has held an event in Louisiana and first since UFC 37 in 2002.

The event was the last UFC Fight Night aired on Spike, and in general, the last UFC Fight Night labeled event until the debut of Fox Sports 1 in 2013. After that, all UFC main cards on cable/satellite Fox channels would be labeled UFC Fight Night. And, in addition to cable/satellite Fox UFC events, most UFC Fight Pass main events would also be labeled UFC Fight Night.

Mackens Semerzier was expected to face Mike Lullo at the event, but pulled out of the event on August 31 and was replaced by Robbie Peralta

DaMarques Johnson was expected to face Clay Harvison at the event, but pulled out of the bout with an injury on August 31 and was replaced by Seth Baczynski.

Daniel Roberts was originally scheduled to face TJ Waldburger, but pulled out due to an injury and was replaced by Mike Stumpf.

The entire preliminary card was streamed on Facebook.

== Results ==
Main Card (Spike TV)
Weight class				Method	Round	Time	Notes
Welterweight	Jake Ellenberger	def.	Jake Shields	TKO (knees and punches)	1	0:53
Middleweight	Court McGee	def.	Dongi Yang	Decision (unanimous) (30–27, 29–28, 30–28)	3	5:00
Featherweight	Erik Koch	def.	Jonathan Brookins	Decision (unanimous) (30–27, 29–28, 30–27)	3	5:00
Middleweight	Alan Belcher	def.	Jason MacDonald	TKO (submission to strikes)	1	3:48
Preliminary card (Facebook)
Weight class				Method	Round	Time	Notes
Lightweight	Vagner Rocha	def.	Cody McKenzie	Submission (rear-naked choke)	2	3:49
Lightweight	Evan Dunham	def.	Shamar Bailey	Decision (unanimous) (30–27, 30–27, 30–27)	3	5:00
Welterweight	Lance Benoist	def.	Matthew Riddle	Decision (unanimous) (29–28, 29–28, 29–28)	3	5:00
Bantamweight	Ken Stone	def.	Donny Walker	Technical Submission (rear-naked choke)	1	2:40
Welterweight	Seth Baczynski	def.	Clay Harvison	Submission (rear-naked choke)	2	1:12
Welterweight	TJ Waldburger	def.	Mike Stumpf	Submission (triangle choke)	1	3:52
Featherweight	Robbie Peralta	def.	Mike Lullo	Decision (unanimous) (30–27, 30–27, 29–28)	3	5:00
Welterweight	Justin Edwards	def.	Jorge Lopez	Decision (unanimous) (29–28, 29–28, 29–28)	3	5:00

== Bonus awards ==
The following fighters received $55,000 bonuses.

- Fight of the Night: Matt Riddle vs. Lance Benoist
- Knockout of the Night: Jake Ellenberger
- Submission of the Night: TJ Waldburger
