= The Ultimate Fighter: Redemption =

UFC mixed martial arts television series and event in 2017

- Genre: Reality, Sports
- Created by: Frank Fertitta III, Lorenzo Fertitta, Dana White
- Starring: Dana White, Cody Garbrandt and T.J. Dillashaw
- Country of origin: United States

Production
- Running time: 60 minutes

Original release
- Network: Fox Sports 1
- Release: April 19 – July 5, 2017

The Ultimate Fighter: Redemption (also known as The Ultimate Fighter 25) is an installment of the Ultimate Fighting Championship (UFC)-produced reality television series The Ultimate Fighter.

The series was officially announced by the UFC on January 15, 2017 during the UFC Fight Night: Rodríguez vs. Penn broadcast. The then-current UFC Bantamweight Champion Cody Garbrandt would be coaching opposite former champion T.J. Dillashaw; Both of them being former training partners. As the twenty-fifth season of the American entries of the series, the producers have opted to bring back previous participants from the previous seasons.

Per the UFC's announcement, the cast consists of welterweights that have all competed on The Ultimate Fighter on previous seasons; this includes former participants and winners of the show, as well as one current UFC fighter. The cast was announced on February 15, including former UFC Lightweight Championship challenger and The Ultimate Fighter 2 welterweight winner Joe Stevenson, The Ultimate Fighter: Team Edgar vs. Team Penn middleweight winner Eddie Gordon, as well as then-current UFC fighter James Krause.

This season debuted on April 19, 2017 on Fox Sports 1.

== Cast ==
=== Coaches ===
Team Garbrandt:

- Cody Garbrandt, Head Coach
- Urijah Faber
- Danny Castillo
- Justin Buchholz
- Fábio Prado
- Robert Meese
- Eddie Barraco
Team Dillashaw:
- T.J. Dillashaw, Head Coach
- Duane Ludwig
- Eliot Marshall
- Leister Bowling
- Matt Brown
- Robert Follis

=== Fighters ===
- Team Garbrandt
  - Seth Baczynski (TUF 11), Mehdi Baghdad (TUF 22), Eddie Gordon (TUF 19), Hayder Hassan (TUF 21), Julian Lane (TUF 16), Justin Edwards (TUF 13) and Johnny Nunez* (TUF 22)
- Team Dillashaw
  - James Krause (TUF 15), Jesse Taylor (TUF 7), Ramsey Nijem (TUF 13), Dhiego Lima (TUF 19), Joe Stevenson (TUF 2), Tom Gallicchio (TUF 22) and Gilbert Smith (TUF 17).

*Nunez replaced Hector Urbina (TUF 19), after Urbina failed to make weight.

== Episodes ==
Episode 1: Redemption (April 19, 2017)

- The episode opens with a look at the personal struggles of this season's cast members, including "TUF 2" winner Joe Stevenson, Gilbert Smith and Tom Gallicchio. A number of other fighters also get a brief spotlight.
- With all the competitors assembled together at the "TUF" gym, UFC President Dana White enters alongside this season's coaches. UFC Bantamweight Champion Cody Garbrandt will take the helm for one team while former champ T.J. Dillashaw will be the opposite coach.
- White explains that the winner of this season will not only get another opportunity to make a career under the UFC banner, but he will also be rewarded with a $250,000 prize. Moreover, each athlete will be paid $10,000 per fight with a potential $5,000 bonus on the line for a stoppage victory. Beyond the standard single-elimination tournament format, White reveals a "wild card" fight will take place to close out the opening round. Two of the losing fighters will be selected for a matchup and the winner will be re-entered into the tournament.
- The fighters immediately jump into a tryout training session. The athletes work out so the coaching staffs from each team can evaluate the talent before team picks are made. Garbrandt takes the approach of interviewing each fighter for a mental evaluation rather than just a physical test. He wants to know their goals, weight and any other details that will determine their success or failure on the show.
- With evaluations complete, the team selections are underway. A coin toss will determine which side gets to pick the first fight or the first fighter. White also announces that teams will alternate fight picks, regardless of who wins the previous fight. Team Dillashaw wins the coin toss and opts to pick the first fighter.
- Fighters selection:

Coach	1st Pick	2nd Pick	3rd Pick	4th Pick	5th Pick	6th Pick	7th Pick
Dillashaw	James Krause	Jesse Taylor	Ramsey Nijem	Dhiego Lima	Joe Stevenson	Tom Gallicchio	Gilbert Smith
Garbrandt	Seth Baczynski	Mehdi Baghdad	Eddie Gordon	Hector Urbina	Hayder Hassan	Julian Lane	Justin Edwards

- Garbrandt announces the first fight and matches his first pick Baczynski against Dillashaw's last pick Smith. Since the tournament will start with back-to-back fights, Dillashaw picks his first choice Krause to face Garbrandt's fourth pick Urbina.
- At the first team Garbrandt training session, there's already some concern about Urbina's weight. He came on the show nearly 200 pounds and has limited time to make it all the way down to the 171-pound welterweight limit.
- After two days of weight cut, Urbina is on the cusp of giving up. He does not think it is realistic for him to make weight and he tells coach Garbrandt that he's officially pulling out of the fight, as he still weighted 188.4 pounds. Garbrandt says he does not regret picking Urbina but feels a lifestyle change is needed if he wants to continue a career in high level MMA. White arrives at the gym and asks Urbina to tell the entire cast and all the coaches that he's out of the fight. Urbina apologizes to everyone involved, but White shows no leniency and tells Urbina to pack his bags and leave the competition immediately.
- White pulls the coaches to an office, where they begin a conversation about what happens in the fallout of Urbina's departure. White says there are alternate fighters standing by outside the house in the event of the current situation, and Johnny Nunez (TUF 22) is one of the athletes available to join the cast. Dillashaw believes he should be able to pick an entirely new fight because of how the coin toss played out, but White shuts down that idea and Garbrandt criticizes Dillashaw for "trying to play the victim, like he’s going to do all season."
- Dillashaw informs Krause of the situation and the fighter is noticeably unhappy. He does not believe the fight date should be pushed back and is frustrated that he had to cut weight for no reason. He tries to avoid dwelling on the situation but says the change is not ideal for his approach to the tournament as a whole.
- Shortly thereafter, Nunez arrives at the gym to join his new teammates for the first time. He's grateful for the opportunity and plans to make up for the disappointment of his first run.
- Back at the house, Smith's intensity begins to gear up ahead of his fight with Baczynski. He feels he's viewed as an easy target after being picked last by his team and pitted in the first fight and believes the other team is wrong by picking him first. Smith's talk continues at the gym and Baczynski overhears everything from the neighboring locker room. He confronts Smith and some heated words are exchanged between the two sides. It briefly fizzles, but when Smith attempts to apologize, tensions flare up once again and the two athletes come face-to-face and exchange more words.
- Garbrandt calls team Dillashaw "a team full of fakes" and that's when Dillashaw becomes irritated. He turns to Garbrandt and fires back with some words of his own, telling his rival to "get the (expletive) out of my face." In a stunning move, Garbrandt then grabs Dillashaw by the throat and shoves him backward. The surrounding fighters immediately jump in and separate the coaches before any serious follow-up physicality can occur. Dillashaw appears unflustered by the situation and says the move was the perfect indictment on Garbrandt’s personality. Garbrandt feels differently, as he believes his opponent is shaken and scared.
- Gilbert Smith defeated Seth Baczynski via unanimous decision after two rounds.
- The next fight is announced by Garbrandt: Eddie Gordon vs. Tom Gallicchio.

Episode 2: Eat Some Souls (April 26, 2017)

- While training at the TUF gym, things get fiery between Dillashaw and Garbrandt on the way to the team locker rooms when the alleged story of Dillashaw's leaving Team Alpha Male, Urijah Faber's training camp, gets out. Both coaches have their sides of the story, and things escalate quickly, causing their fighters to separate them. Even Faber, who was, as he said, "cool" with Dillashaw, joins in the fray, calling his former fighter's version a bunch of "bold-faced lies".
- Tom Gallicchio defeated Eddie Gordon via submission (rear-naked choke) in the first round.
- The next fight is announced by Dillashaw: Jesse Taylor vs. Mehdi Baghdad.

Episode 3: Iron Sharpens Iron (May 3, 2017)

- Jesse Taylor defeated Mehdi Baghdad via unanimous decision after two rounds.
- The next fight is announced by Dillashaw: James Krause vs. Johnny Nunez.

Episode 4: Piece of Us (May 10, 2017)

- The fighters on Team Dillashaw create a unique birthday card made out of their body hair for coach T.J. and brings it to the gym, along with a cake.
- At the TUF house, Cody invites Urijah Faber, UFC Featherweight fighter Clay Guida, former UFC Bantamweight champion Miesha Tate, and his girlfriend "Lunchbox" to watch the latest UFC event. During the fights, Julian Lane, a former bartender, started mixing drinks and gets Cody, who does not drink alcohol much, drunk.
- Cody hangs with da bois
- James Krause defeated Johnny Nunez via submission (rear-naked choke) in the first round.
- The next fight is announced by Garbrandt: Hayder Hassan vs. Dhiego Lima.

Episode 5: A Brutal Business (May 17, 2017)

- In order to help his team, Garbrandt brings in Dr. Jon Petrick to perform a craniofacial release, a ballooning of the nose to open up the nasal passages, helping more oxygen get to the brain. Urijah Faber goes first and it is not a pleasant experience.
- Dhiego Lima defeated Hayder Hassan via unanimous decision after two rounds.
- The next fight is announced by Dillashaw: Ramsey Nijem vs. Julian Lane.

Episode 6: Let Me Bang! (May 24, 2017)

- Things get instense between Ramsey Nijem and Juilian Lane during their stare down at the weight-in. So much so that the assistant coaches from each team, Justin Buchholz and Duane Ludwig get into an argument over their respective gyms and how Duane believes he's the one who turned T.J. into a champion. They, along with Cody and T.J. have to be separated.
- Ramsey Nijem defeated Julian Lane via TKO (punches) in the first round.
- After the fight, Cody complains that the referee stopped the fight way too early, especially when Lane was dominating the fight early in the round, making for an intense match. Team Dillashaw is now a perfect 6-0.
- The next fight is announced by Garbrandt: Joe Stevenson vs. Justin Edwards.

Episode 7: Dark Horse (May 31, 2017)

- Justin Edwards defeated Joe Stevenson via unanimous decision after two rounds.
- Dana White asks Cody and T.J. their thoughts on what two fighters they think deserve a second chance in the wild card fight. Based on who will be the best and go the furthest in the UFC, Dana picks Joe Stevenson and Hayder Hassan. And Cody isn't happy with Dana's decision.
- Feeling like T.J. picked his fighter Stevenson after being a "legend" in the UFC, Cody does not think Stevenson is ready to fight in only six days rest due to taking "too many shots" in his last fight. Cody's fighter Eddie Gordon also argues with T.J. that he should have deserved a wild card pick as well.
- The wild card fight is announced by Dillashaw: Joe Stevenson vs. Hayder Hassan.

Episode 8: Kryptonite (June 7, 2017)

- Hayder Hassan defeated Joe Stevenson via KO (punch) in the first round.
- The quarter final match-ups are announced as:

- Tom Gallicchio vs. Justin Edwards
- Gilbert Smith vs. Dhiego Lima
- Jesse Taylor vs. Hayder Hassan
- James Krause vs. Ramsey Nijem

- With a break in training, it’s time for the annual "Coaches Challenge." This season, head coaches Dillashaw and Garbrandt clash in a game of water tetherball. The winning coach receives $10,000 while each member of their team gets a $1,500 prize.
- Both fighters admit they have minimal experience playing tetherball and Dillashaw falls into the water before the game even begins. Garbrandt takes a dominant 8–4 lead in the game up to 10, but Dillashaw stages a huge rally to tie it at 8 apiece. Dillashaw completes his comeback of six consecutive points and pulls off the victory. He wins the prize for himself and his team, and he says of Garbrandt, "I watched him give up."
- Tom Gallicchio defeated Justin Edwards via submission (rear-naked choke) in the first round.

Episode 9: Killashaw (June 14, 2017)

- Both coaches reward their teams and their fighters getting into the quarter finals by renting a party bus to take them to have dinner at a hibachi Japanese steakhouse. But Gilbert Smith is a party-pooper and does not partake in the celebration, believing he hasn't anything to celebrate yet and wants to concentrate on his upcoming fight.
- After Team Grabrandt defiles T.J.'s pictures hanging in the gym by using red tape to make a forked snake tongue over his mouth, T.J. pranks back with custom t-shirts for his team. The logo is a snake with the name "Killashaw Team Ninja" across it, along with the motto, "strike hard, strike fast, no mercy".
- Dhiego Lima defeated Gilbert Smith via unanimous decision after three rounds.
- Following the loss, Smith says he's going to retire from MMA competition after a more than six-year career. He shares a moment with the coaches and fighters from both sides before leaving his gloves in the center of the octagon.

Episode 10: Time to Smash (June 21, 2017)

- During the first fight weight-in, once again Dillashaw and Garbrandt's quarreling over why Dillashaw left Team Alpha Male escalate and their assistant coaches get in on it, taking away the focus on their fighters.
- Jesse Taylor defeated Hayder Hassan via submission (rear-naked choke) in the first round.
- James Krause defeated Ramsey Nijem via unanimous decision after three rounds.
- The semi final match-ups are announced as:

- Dhiego Lima vs. Tom Gallicchio
- James Krause vs. Jesse Taylor

Episode 11: Embrace the Snake (June 28, 2017)

- With James Krause injured in his last fight due to a cornea scratch, Dana tells Cody he has the choice of picking Krause's replacement in the event the physician does not clear him to fight.
- Ramsey Nijem is upset because he believes he should move onto the finals in Krause's place. His complaining angers Gilbert Smith so much so that he confronts Ramsey and starts to argue but backs down once he realises Ramsey isn't intimidated.
- T.J. decides to get back at Cody for pranking him and paints Team Grabrandt's locker room in Team Dillashaw's colors and hangs pictures of himself up. But Cody's fighters quickly make it a "snake free zone" once again before Cody gets back.
- T.J.'s prank goes a step further when he embraces Cody's nickname for him; the snake, by putting live snakes in Team Grabrandt's locker room.
- Dhiego Lima defeated Tom Gallicchio by unanimous decision after three rounds.

Episode 12: The Winner's Circle (July 5, 2017)

- T.J. brings in TUF 24 winner Tim Elliott to help with James Krause who is his coach, teammate and friend. But Elliot overstays his welcome at the TUF house when his inappropriate comments about a "winner's circle" rub the losing fighters the wrong way, especially Julian Lane and Justin Edwards who get in his face and push him out the door.
- Krause goes to the eye physician to get his corneal abrasion checked. It turns out 80 percent of his eye skin was taken off during his last bout, however, it healed nicely and the doctor clears him to fight.
- After Elliot and the rest of Krause's training partners leave, Seth Baczynski gets into a pushing altercation with Krause as to why all of Krause's teammates were in the house in the first place.
- Jesse Taylor defeated James Krause via technical submission (guillotine choke) in the third round.
- In the finale: TUF 19 runner-up Dhiego Lima vs. TUF 7 Jesse Taylor who is 7–0 in the cage of the TUF gym.

== Tournament bracket ==
Preliminary
Seth Baczynski	2
Gilbert Smith	UD
Hayder Hassan	2
Dhiego Lima	UD
Eddie Gordon	1
Tom Gallicchio	SUB
Justin Edwards	UD
Joe Stevenson	2
James Krause	SUB
Johnny Nunez	1
Ramsey Nijem	TKO
Julian Lane	1
Jesse Taylor	UD
Mehdi Baghdad	2
Joe Stevenson	1
Hayder Hassan	KO

Quarter-finals
Gilbert Smith	3
Dhiego Lima	UD
Tom Gallicchio	SUB
Justin Edwards	1
James Krause	UD
Ramsey Nijem	3
Jesse Taylor	SUB
Hayder Hassan	1

Semi-finals
Dhiego Lima	UD
Tom Gallicchio	3
James Krause	3
Jesse Taylor	SUB

Finale
Dhiego Lima	2
Jesse Taylor	SUB

Legend
	Team Garbrandt
	Team Dillashaw
UD	Unanimous Decision
MD	Majority Decision
SUB	Submission
(T)KO	(Technical) Knock Out

== The Ultimate Fighter 25 Finale ==
The Ultimate Fighter: Redemption Finale
- The poster for The Ultimate Fighter: Redemption Finale
- Promotion: Ultimate Fighting Championship
- Date: July 7, 2017
- Venue: T-Mobile Arena
- City: Paradise, Nevada
- Attendance: 6,308
- Total gate: $432,495

Event chronology
UFC Fight Night: Chiesa vs. Lee	The Ultimate Fighter: Redemption Finale	UFC 213: Romero vs. Whittaker

The Ultimate Fighter: Redemption Finale (also known as The Ultimate Fighter 25 Finale) was a mixed martial arts event produced by the Ultimate Fighting Championship held on July 7, 2017 at T-Mobile Arena in Paradise, Nevada, part of the Las Vegas metropolitan area.

=== Background ===
The event was headlined by a lightweight bout between Michael Johnson and former WSOF Lightweight Champion Justin Gaethje.

The welterweight finals of The Ultimate Fighter: Redemption took place at the event.

Promotional newcomer Amanda Ribas was expected to face Juliana Lima at the event, but Ribas was flagged by USADA for a potential anti-doping violation and removed from the bout. The possible violation stems from a sample collected June 7. She was replaced by Tecia Torres.

Steve Bossé was expected to face Jared Cannonier at the event. However, Bossé was removed from the fight just days before the event and was replaced by promotional newcomer Nick Roehrick.

Aspen Ladd was expected to face Jessica Eye at the event, but on the day of the fight, she was pulled due to being ill and the fight was canceled.

=== Results ===
Main Card (Fox Sports 1)
Weight class				Method	Round	Time	Notes
Lightweight	Justin Gaethje	def.	Michael Johnson	TKO (punches and knees)	2	4:48
Welterweight	Jesse Taylor	def.	Dhiego Lima	Submission (rear-naked choke)	2	0:43	(Note: The Ultimate Fighter 25 Tournament Final.)
Lightweight	Drakkar Klose	def.	Marc Diakiese	Decision (split) (29–28, 28–29, 29–28)	3	5:00
Light Heavyweight	Jared Cannonier	def.	Nick Roehrick	TKO (elbows)	3	2:08
Middleweight	Brad Tavares	def.	Elias Theodorou	Decision (unanimous) (29–28, 29–28, 29–28)	3	5:00
Light Heavyweight	Jordan Johnson	def.	Marcel Fortuna	Decision (unanimous) (29–28, 29–28, 29–28)	3	5:00
Preliminary Card (Fox Sports 1)
Women's Strawweight	Angela Hill	def.	Ashley Yoder	Decision (unanimous) (30–27, 30–27, 30–27)	3	5:00
Welterweight	James Krause	def.	Tom Gallicchio	Decision (unanimous) (30–27, 30–27, 30–27)	3	5:00
Light Heavyweight	C. B. Dollaway	def.	Ed Herman	Decision (unanimous) (29–28, 29–27, 29–27)	3	5:00
Women's Strawweight	Tecia Torres	def.	Juliana Lima	Submission (rear-naked choke)	2	0:53
Preliminary Card (UFC Fight Pass)
Featherweight	Gray Maynard	def.	Teruto Ishihara	Decision (unanimous) (30–26, 30–26, 30–26)	3	5:00

=== Bonus awards ===
The following fighters were awarded $50,000 bonuses:

- Fight of the Night: Justin Gaethje vs. Michael Johnson
- Performance of the Night: Justin Gaethje and Tecia Torres

=== Reported payout ===
The following is the reported payout to the fighters as reported to the Nevada State Athletic Commission. It does not include sponsor money and also does not include the UFC's traditional "fight night" bonuses. The total disclosed payout for the event was $1,038,000.

- Justin Gaethje: $200,000 (includes $100,000 win bonus) def. Michael Johnson: $47,000
- Jesse Taylor: $30,000 (includes $15,000 win bonus) def. Dhiego Lima: $15,000
- Drakkar Klose: $24,000 (includes $12,000 win bonus) def. Marc Diakiese: $24,000
- Jared Cannonier: $100,000 (includes $50,000 win bonus) def. Nick Roehrick: $12,000
- Brad Tavares: $68,000 (includes $34,000 win bonus) def. Elias Theodorou: $34,000
- Jordan Johnson: $24,000 (includes $12,000 win bonus) def. Marcel Fortuna: $14,000
- Angela Hill: $36,000 (includes $18,000 win bonus) def. Ashley Yoder: $12,000
- James Krause: $48,000 (includes $24,000 win bonus) def. Tom Gallicchio: $10,000
- C.B. Dollaway: $86,000 (includes $43,000 win bonus) def. Ed Herman: $54,000
- Tecia Torres: $60,000 (includes $30,000 win bonus) def. Juliana Lima: $17,000
- Gray Maynard: $102,000 (includes $51,000 win bonus) def. Teruto Ishihara: $21,000

=== Aftermath ===
On September 21, it was announced that Roehrick accepted a one-year suspension from the USADA, stemming from a positive test for clomiphene and its metabolite, 4-hydroxyclomiphene. The results came from an out-of-competition urine sample collected on August 8.

== Coaches' Fight ==
UFC 217: Bisping vs. St-Pierre was held on November 4, 2017, at Madison Square Garden in New York City, New York.

A UFC Bantamweight Championship bout between champion Cody Garbrandt and former champion T.J. Dillashaw, was previously scheduled to serve as headliner for UFC 213. However, Garbrandt withdrew from the fight due to a back injury. The fight was later rescheduled for UFC 217.

- Bantamweight Championship bout: Cody Garbrandt (c) vs. T.J. Dillashaw

T.J. Dillashaw defeated Cody Garbrandt (c) via KO (punches) after 2:41 in the second round.

== See also ==
- The Ultimate Fighter
- List of current UFC fighters
- List of UFC events
- 2017 in UFC
