= Čedomir Čupić =

Serbian professor and political scientist

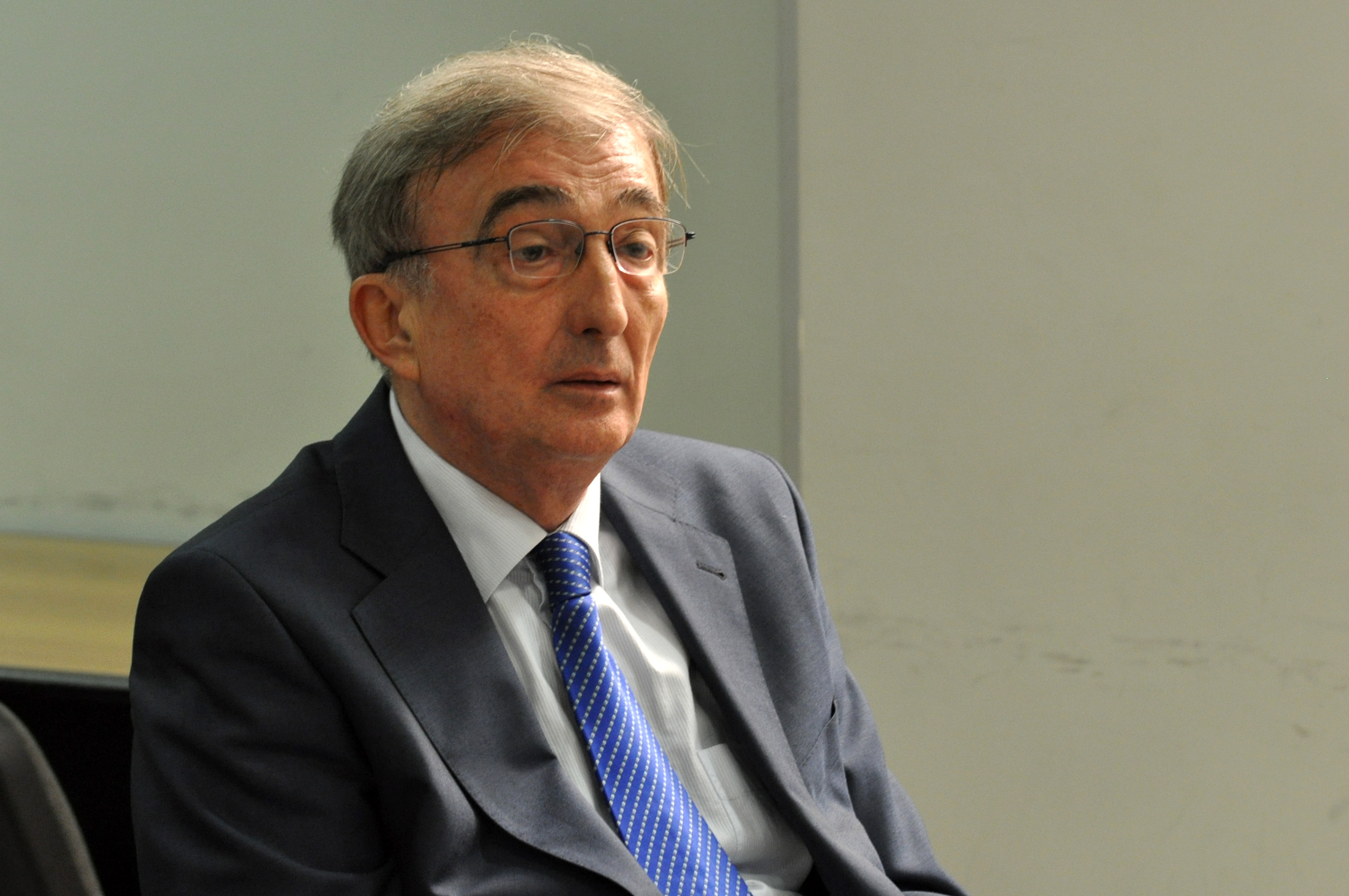
Čupić in 2014

Čedomir Čupić (Serbian Cyrillic: Чедомир Чупић, born 1947 in Sivac near Sombor) is a Serbian political scientist and professor at the Faculty of Political Sciences in Belgrade. He became known to the wider public in 2001, when he became a member, and later president, of the national Anti-Corruption Council.

== Biography ==
Čupić was born in Sivac in 1947, where he completed the primary school. He completed Sombor gymnasium and studied at the Faculty of Political Sciences in Belgrade, where he received MA and PhD degrees. After graduation, he worked at Radio Belgrade, which he left in protest in 1992, as a sign of solidarity with colleagues who got sacked for political reasons. Čupić participated in opposition groups against policy of Slobodan Milošević, and he was particularly active in the Belgrade student protests 1996–97. In 1999, he joined the Otpor! movement and became a member of its council.

After democratic changes in the country, Čupić became a member of various anti-corruption government bodies. In 2001, he was the Serbian Government's Chair of Anti-Corruption Council. Since its establishment in 2009, he has been the Chair of the Council of the Anti-Corruption Agency of the Republic of Serbia. At these positions, he often encountered clashes: In 2002, Čupić criticized media mogul Željko Mitrović for the way he made money under Milošević's rule, and advocated razing illegally constructed building of his RTV Pink. Later, Čupić won the lawsuit against Mitrović for an insult. In 2013, tabloid Kurir accused Čupić for sexual harassment of his female students; several NGOs and media said the accusation was an attempt of a "media lynch". Čupić won this lawsuit as well.

On the Faculty of Political Sciences, Čupić teaches Sociology, Political Anthropology and Ethics in Media. He also taught on the Faculty of Economics in Belgrade and Faculty of Political Sciences in Montenegro. He is married and has one son.
