= Nico Musoke =

Swedish mixed martial arts fighter

- Born: April 5, 1986 (age 40); Botkyrka, Stockholm, Sweden
- Other names: Nicholas Musoke
- Nationality: Swedish
- Height: 6 ft 0 in (1.83 m)
- Weight: 170 lb (77 kg; 12 st 2 lb)
- Division: Welterweight (2007–2017); Middleweight (2013, 2018–present)
- Reach: 75 in (191 cm)
- Fighting out of: Stockholm, Sweden
- Team: Rinkeby Muay Thai; Tristar Gym
- Rank: Purple belt in Brazilian Jiu-Jitsu
- Years active: 2007–present

Mixed martial arts record
- Total: 22
- Wins: 16
- By knockout: 4
- By submission: 5
- By decision: 7
- Losses: 5
- By knockout: 1
- By submission: 1
- By decision: 3
- No contests: 1

Amateur record
- Total: 1
- Losses: 1

Other information
- Website: http://nicomusoke.com/
- Mixed martial arts record from Sherdog

Nicholas "Nico" Musoke (born April 5, 1986) is a Swedish mixed martial artist who competes in the middleweight division of Swedish promotion Superior Challenge. A professional mixed martial artist since 2007, Musoke has also competed in the Ultimate Fighting Championship.

== Mixed martial arts career ==
=== Early career ===
Musoke began his MMA career as an amateur in 2005 taking on Jasper Gunnarsson in a losing effort via split decision. He then made his pro debut two years later at Shooto Finland against Tomi Hietanen. He won via rear-naked choke in the first round. Nico then won his following three fights ending all of them in the first round with two of them ending in less than 50 seconds.

Musoke suffered his first professional loss at the hands of future BAMMA and UFC fighter Danny Mitchell, via armbar in the second round. He bounced back from the loss with a TKO win over Wiktor Sobczyk at BOB 3.

On June 18, 2011, he took part in a four-man tournament held by On Top Promotions where the winner would leave as the OTP Welterweight champion. In the first fight he suffered his second career loss, this time by decision against future Cage Warriors Welterweight Champion and fellow future UFC fighter Cathal Pendred. However, before the final could take place Pendred was forced out due to injury. Musoke took his place and defeated another fellow future UFC fighter in Stevie Ray by submission due to a rear naked choke at the end of the first round to become the OTP Welterweight champion.

Since then Musoke had gone 4-0 (1) in his last 5 fights, including one defense of his OTP-title, before getting the call from the UFC.

=== Ultimate Fighting Championship ===
Musoke moved to Middleweight to make his UFC debut against long time UFC veteran Alessio Sakara, filling in for the injured Magnus Cedenblad at UFC Fight Night 30. He won the fight in the first round via armbar. He earned Submission of the Night honors.

Musoke dropped back to welterweight and faced Viscardi Andrade on February 15, 2014, at UFC Fight Night 36. Despite being dropped and almost finished in the first round by Andrade, Musoke was able to recover quickly and take control of the fight, rocking Andrade on their feet in round 2 and control the action on the ground in round 3. His performance earned him the unanimous decision victory.

On June 28, 2014, Musoke fought Kelvin Gastelum at UFC Fight Night 44 in San Antonio, Texas. Prior to the fight, Gastelum missed weight by one and three-quarter pounds and forfeited 20% of his fight purse to Musoke. After a good and fairly dominant first round from Musoke, Gastelum rallied to win the next two rounds convincingly resulting in a unanimous decision loss for Musoke.

Musoke was briefly linked to a bout with Amir Sadollah on October 4, 2014, at UFC Fight Night 53. However, Sadollah was pulled from the pairing with Musoke in favor of a bout with Yoshihiro Akiyama on September 20, 2014, at UFC Fight Night 52. Musoke instead faced Alexander Yakovlev. He won the fight by unanimous decision.

Musoke faced Albert Tumenov on January 24, 2015, at UFC on Fox 14. He lost the fight by unanimous decision.

After an extended hiatus, Musoke returned to face Bojan Veličković on May 28, 2017, at UFC Fight Night 109. In a back-and-forth fight, he lost by knockout in the last minute of the third round when Veličković connected with a right hook to the temple, causing Musoke to become wobbled and fall to the ground .

=== Post-UFC career ===
On September 12, 2018 - over a year after his last fight in the UFC - it was announced that Musoke had signed a contract with his native Superior Challenge and will be moving up to middleweight. In his promotional return, Musoke faced Daniel Acácio at Superior Challenge 18 on December 1, 2018. He won the fight via unanimous decision.

Musoke then fought for the Superior Challenge Middleweight Championship against Dylan Andrews at Superior Challenge 19 on May 11, 2019. He won the fight via unanimous decision and claimed the title.

As the first title defense, Musoke faced Marcelo Alfaya at Superior Challenge 20 on December 7, 2019. He successfully defended the title by winning the bout via unanimous decision.

== Championships and accomplishments ==
- Ultimate Fighting Championship
  - Submission of the Night (One time) vs. Alessio Sakara
- Superior Challenge
  - SC Middleweight Championship (One time; Current)
  - One successful title defense
- On Top Promotions
  - OTP Welterweight Championship (One time)
  - One successful title defense
  - OTP 2011 Welterweight Tournament winner
- Nordic MMA Awards - MMAViking.com
  - 2013 Breakthrough Fighter of the Year

== Mixed martial arts record ==
Professional record breakdown
22 matches	16 wins	5 losses
By knockout	4	1
By submission	5	1
By decision	7	3
No contests	1	

Res.	Record	Opponent	Method	Event	Date	Round	Time	Location	Notes
Win	16–5 (1)	Marcelo Alfaya	Decision (unanimous)	Superior Challenge 20	December 7, 2019	3	5:00	Stockholm, Sweden	Defended the SC Middleweight Championship.
Win	15–5 (1)	Dylan Andrews	Decision (unanimous)	Superior Challenge 19	May 11, 2019	3	5:00	Stockholm, Sweden	Won the SC Middleweight Championship.
Win	14–5 (1)	Daniel Acácio	Decision (unanimous)	Superior Challenge 18	December 1, 2018	3	5:00	Stockholm, Sweden	Return to middleweight.
Loss	13–5 (1)	Bojan Veličković	KO (punches)	UFC Fight Night: Gustafsson vs. Teixeira	May 28, 2017	3	4:37	Stockholm, Sweden	
Loss	13–4 (1)	Albert Tumenov	Decision (unanimous)	UFC on Fox: Gustafsson vs. Johnson	January 24, 2015	3	5:00	Stockholm, Sweden	
Win	13–3 (1)	Alexander Yakovlev	Decision (unanimous)	UFC Fight Night: Nelson vs. Story	October 4, 2014	3	5:00	Stockholm, Sweden	
Loss	12–3 (1)	Kelvin Gastelum	Decision (unanimous)	UFC Fight Night: Swanson vs. Stephens	June 28, 2014	3	5:00	San Antonio, Texas, United States	Catchweight (172.75 lbs) bout; Gastelum missed weight.
Win	12–2 (1)	Viscardi Andrade	Decision (unanimous)	UFC Fight Night: Machida vs. Mousasi	February 15, 2014	3	5:00	Jaraguá do Sul, Brazil	
Win	11–2 (1)	Alessio Sakara	Submission (armbar)	UFC Fight Night: Machida vs. Munoz	October 26, 2013	1	3:07	Manchester, England	Middleweight bout. Submission of the Night.
Win	10–2 (1)	Alexander Landaeta Utrera	Decision (unanimous)	Golden Ring: Wallberg vs. Prazak	June 14, 2013	3	5:00	Stockholm, Sweden	
NC	9–2 (1)	Mickaël Lebout	No Contest (judging error)	Vision FC 5: Finale	December 1, 2012	3	5:00	Stockholm, Sweden	Originally a majority draw; overturned due to a judging error.
Win	9–2	Dean Caldwell	TKO (punches)	OTP: On Top 5	June 2, 2012	1	3:49	Glasgow, Scotland	Defended the OTP Welterweight Championship.
Win	8–2	Kai Puolakka	Submission (guillotine choke)	Cage 18: Turku	March 3, 2012	3	1:39	Turku, Finland	
Win	7–2	Olli Jaakko Uitto	Decision (unanimous)	Cage 16: 1st Defense	October 8, 2011	3	5:00	Espoo, Finland	
Win	6–2	Stevie Ray	Submission (rear-naked choke)	OTP: On Top 2	June 18, 2011	1	4:56	Glasgow Scotland	Won the OTP Welterweight Championship. OTP Welterweight Tournament Final.
Loss	5–2	Cathal Pendred	Decision (unanimous)	OTP: On Top 2	June 18, 2011	2	5:00	Glasgow, Scotland	OTP Welterweight Tournament Semifinal.
Win	5–1	Wiktor Sobczyk	TKO (punches)	Battle of Botnia 3	December 4, 2010	2	2:08	Umeå, Sweden	
Loss	4–1	Danny Mitchell	Submission (armbar)	Superior Challenge 6	October 29, 2010	2	1:56	Stockholm, Sweden	
Win	4–0	Premysl Nemec	TKO (punches)	Superior Challenge 5	May 1, 2010	1	0:49	Stockholm, Sweden	
Win	3–0	Jeppe Fausing	KO (punch)	Fighter Gala 9	August 30, 2009	1	0:12	Elsinore, Denmark	
Win	2–0	Fredrik Klingsell	Submission (rear-naked choke)	The Zone FC 1	February 9, 2008	1	1:16	Stockholm, Sweden	
Win	1–0	Tomi Hietanen	Submission (rear-naked choke)	Shooto Finland: Chicago Collision 3	November 17, 2007	1	3:47	Lahti, Finland	

== See also ==
- List of current UFC fighters
- List of male mixed martial artists
