= Sivac =

Sivac Сивац (Serbian)
- Village (Selo)
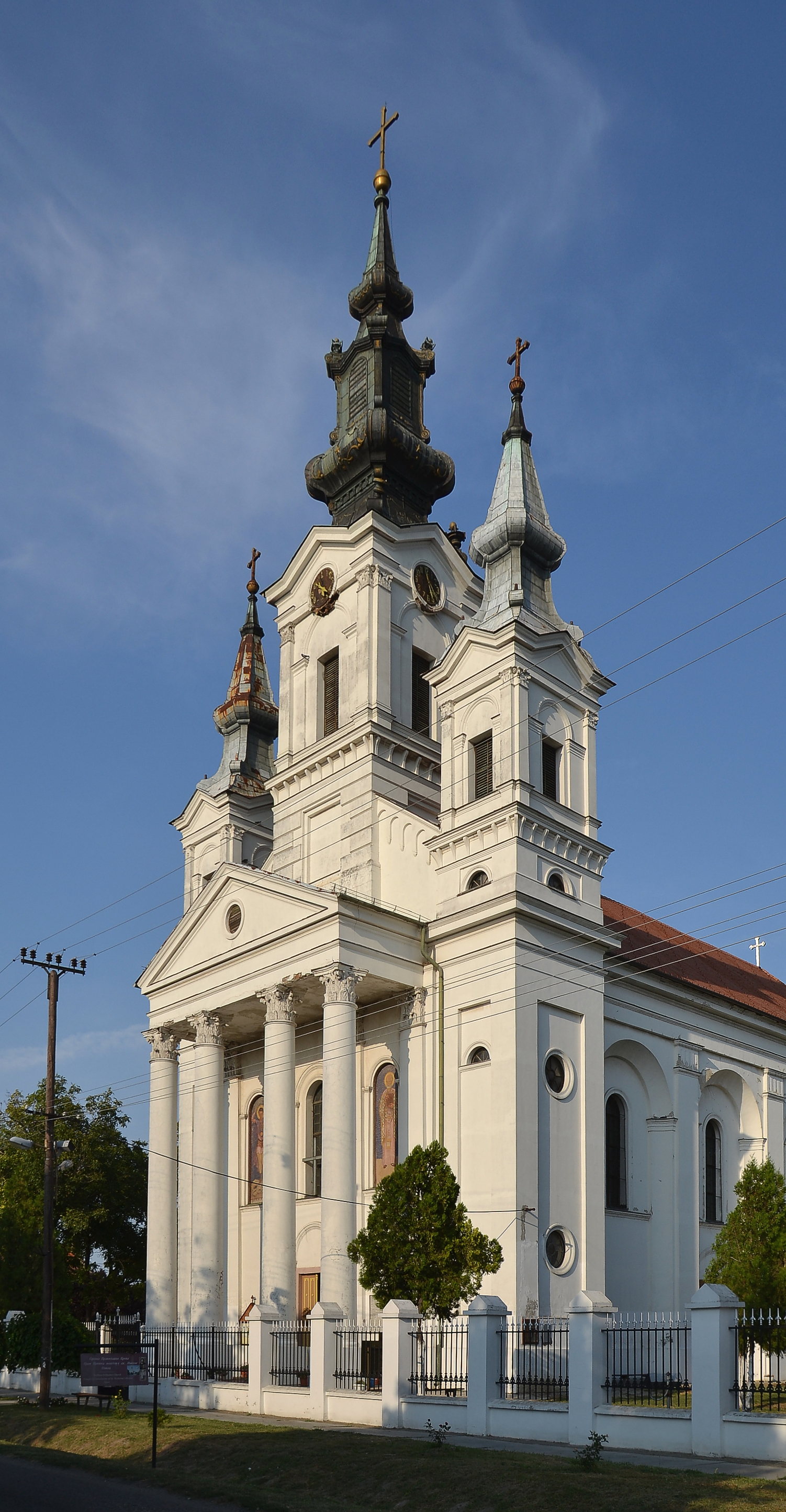
- The Orthodox Church of St. Nicholas

- Location within Vojvodina Location within Serbia Location within Europe
- Coordinates: 45°42′N 19°23′E
- Country: Serbia
- Province: Vojvodina
- Region: Bačka
- District: West Bačka
- Municipality: Kula

Area
  - Total: 153.15 km^{2} (59.13 sq mi)
- Elevation: 103 m (338 ft)

Population (2022)
  - Total: 6,950
  - Density: 45.4/km^{2} (118/sq mi)
- Time zone: UTC+1 (CET)
  - Summer (DST): UTC+2 (CEST)
- Area code: (+381) 25
- Car plates: KU

Sivac (Serbian Cyrillic: Сивац) is a village located in the municipality of Kula, Serbia. The village has a Serb ethnic majority with a sizable Montenegrin minority, with its population numbering 6,950 inhabitants (as of 2022 census).

== History ==
The existence of Sivac is first mentioned in a list of settlements in Bačka from 1692. The village is divided into two connected settlements, Stari Sivac, which was historically populated by Serbs and Novi Sivac, which was historically populated by Swabians. Following World War II, Sivac was one of many villages in Vojvodina that were involved in the 'colonization' process in which refugees from across Yugoslavia were settled. Sivac was one of the few villages in Serbia in which the majority of post-war settlers were from Montenegro.

== Demographics ==
=== Historical population ===
- 1961: 11,448
- 1971: 10,469
- 1981: 9,979
- 1991: 9,514
- 2002: 8,992
- 2011: 7,895
- 2022: 6,950

=== Ethnic groups ===
The ethnic groups as of 2002 census:

- Serbs = 5,179 (57.59%)
- Montenegrins = 2,703 (30.06%)
- Hungarians = 425 (4.73%)
- Croats = 162 (1.80%)
- Yugoslavs = 54 (0.60%)

== Notable people ==
- Čedomir Čupić (born 1947), political scientist
- Milorad Vučelić (born 1948), businessman, president of FK Partizan
- Milan Ivanović (born 1960), former Australian football player
- Dragoje Leković (born 1967), former Yugoslav football player
- Nikola Joksović (born 1994), Serbian mixed martial artist

== See also ==
- List of places in Serbia
- List of cities, towns and villages in Vojvodina
- Montenegrins of Serbia

== Gallery ==
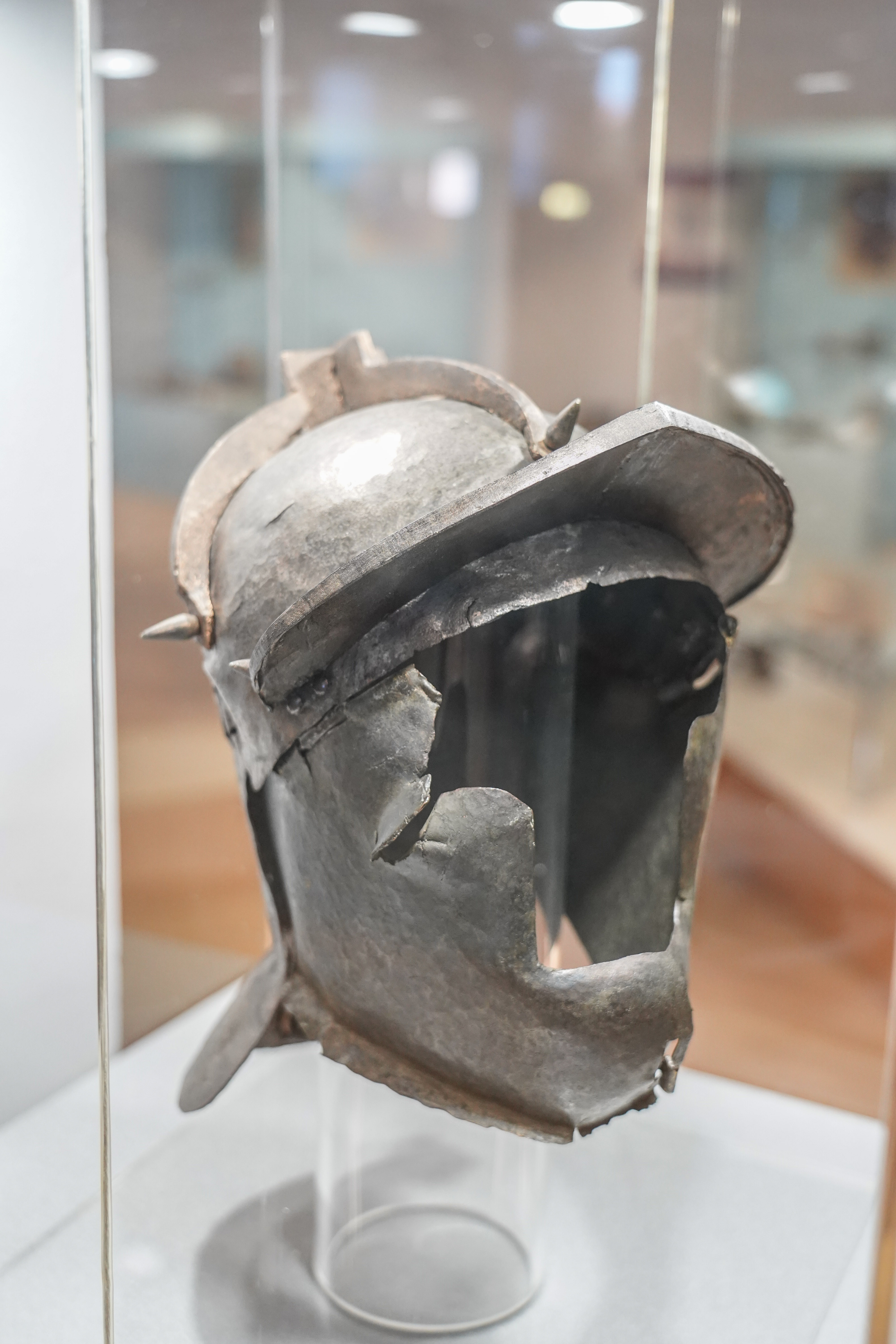
A 2nd century Roman helmet discovered in Sivac, on display at the Sombor City Museum

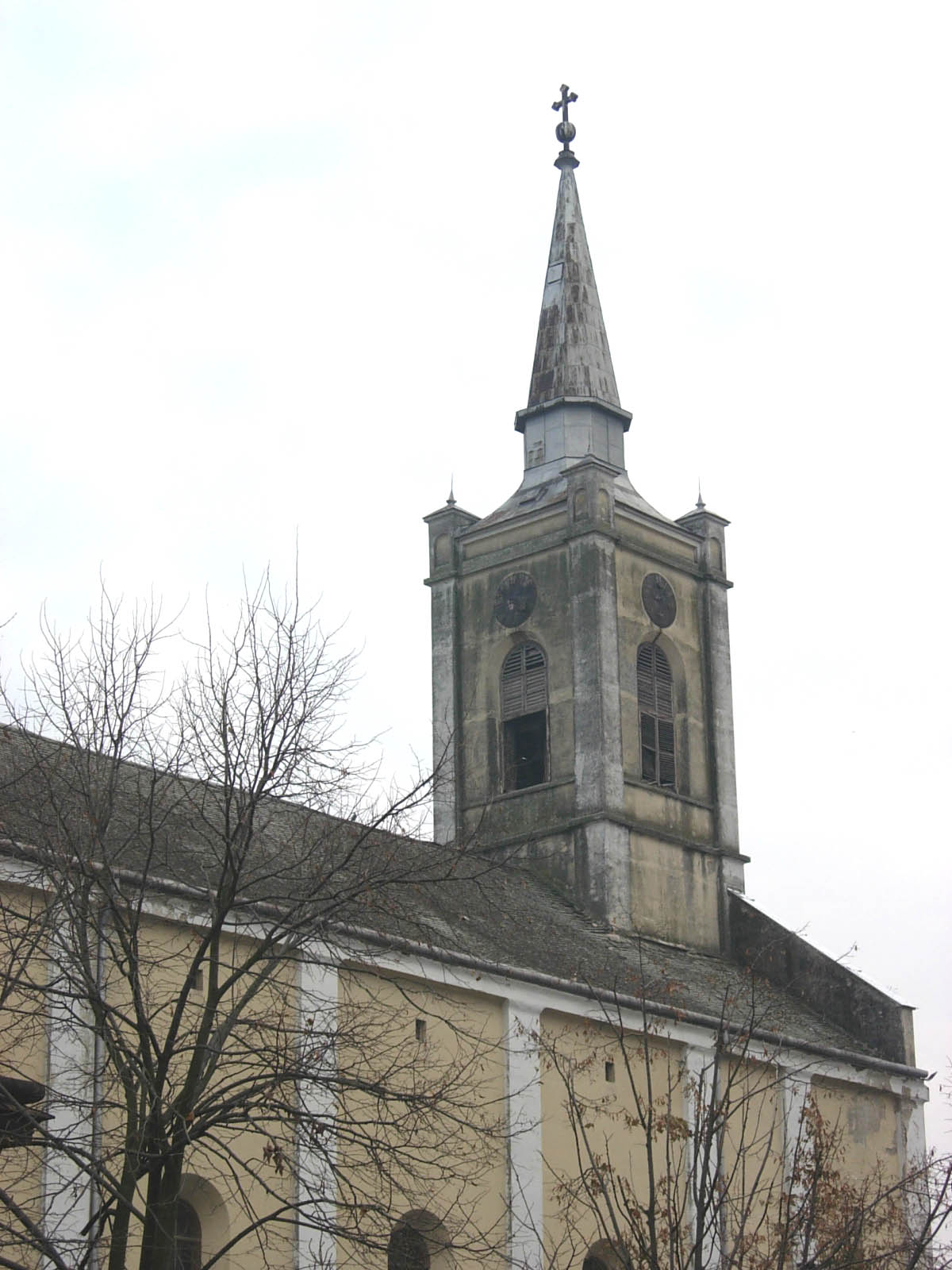
The Name of Mary Catholic Church.

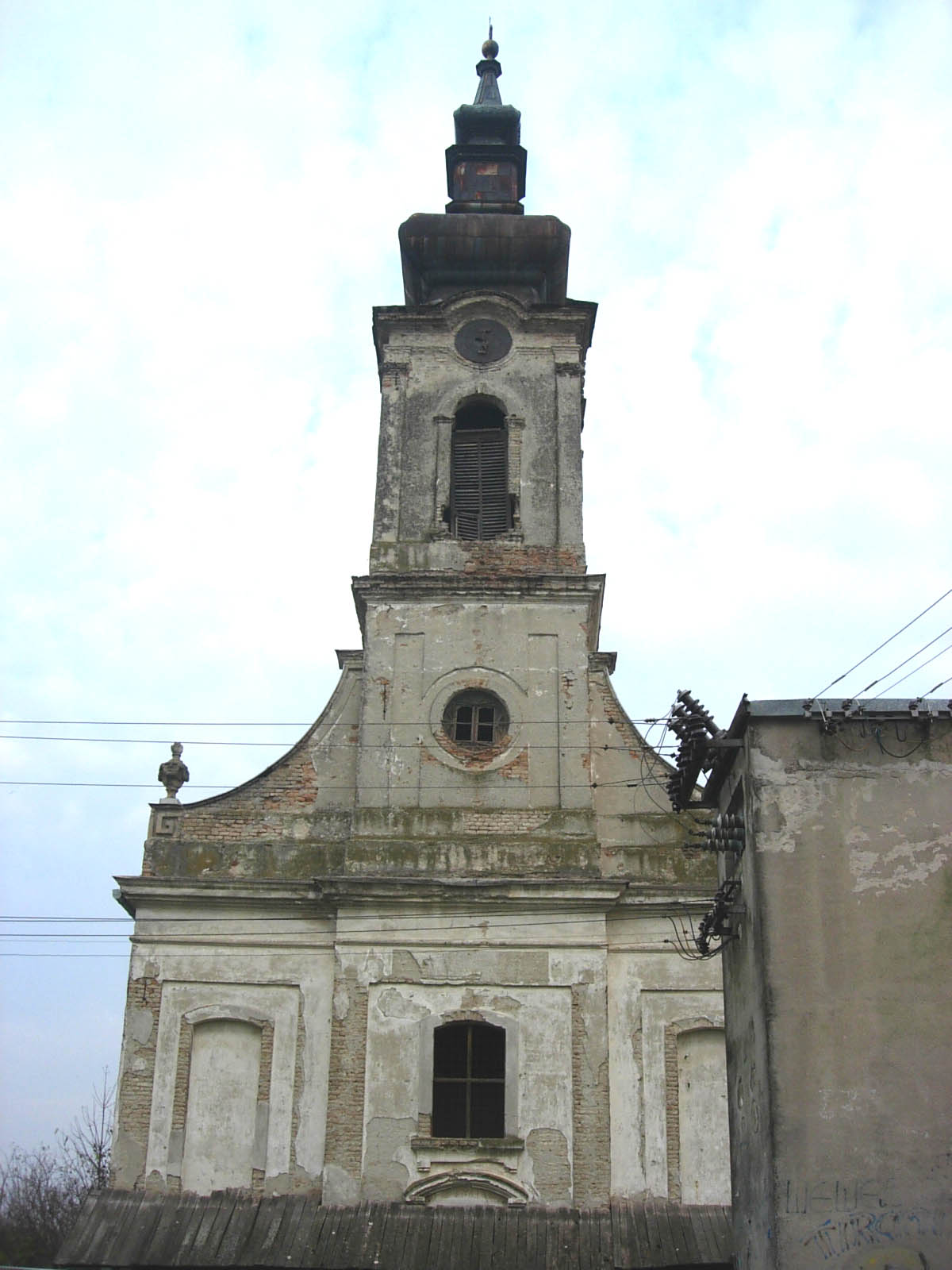
The Calvinist church.
