= Carlo Prater =

Brazilian mixed martial arts fighter

- Born: Carlo Ricardo Prater; June 25, 1981 (age 45); São Paulo, Brazil
- Other names: Neo
- Height: 6 ft 0 in (1.83 m)
- Weight: 170.7 lb (77.4 kg; 12.19 st)
- Division: Lightweight; Welterweight
- Reach: 73 in (190 cm)
- Stance: Orthodox
- Fighting out of: Brasília, Brazil
- Team: Prater MMA; Metro Fight Club
- Rank: Black belt in Brazilian jiu-jitsu Black belt in Luta Livre; Brown belt in Judo
- Years active: 2002-present

Mixed martial arts record
- Total: 61
- Wins: 35
- By knockout: 3
- By submission: 19
- By decision: 12
- By disqualification: 1
- Losses: 25
- By knockout: 4
- By submission: 4
- By decision: 17
- Draws: 1

Amateur record
- Total: 1
- Wins: 0
- Losses: 1
- By knockout: 1

Other information
- Mixed martial arts record from Sherdog

Carlo Ricardo Prater (born June 25, 1981) is a Brazilian professional mixed martial artist previously competing in the Welterweight division. A professional MMA competitor since 2002, Prater has also formerly competed for the UFC, WEC, Strikeforce, the MFC, Vale Tudo Japan, the Palace Fighting Championship, Legacy FC, and Titan FC.

== Background ==
Born in São Paulo, Brazil, Prater was raised along with his younger sister by parents who had been American missionaries in Brazil since the 1970s. Prater's father took a pulpit job in Connecticut, resulting in the family to move to the United States. Prater was enrolled in Tang Soon Do upon moving to the U.S. in 1987, which he continued training in for three years. After his parents divorced, Prater moved with his father to Oklahoma in 1993 and began competing in wrestling. After viewing the first UFC events, Prater began training in Brazilian jiu-jitsu and judo while he was also wrestling. Having excelled, Prater was recruited by MMA fighter and grappler Jeff Lindsey before moving back to Brazil in 1998. Still in high school, Prater also began training in Luta Livre as well as boxing and kickboxing. In 2000, Prater went to Thailand where he began competing in Muay Thai before later transitioning to competing in professional mixed martial arts, moving to Texas to train with Yves Edwards.

== Mixed martial arts career ==
=== Early career ===
Prater would make his debut as an amateur on March 28, 1998, when he faced David Hargrove at USWF 8. He lost via first-round TKO.

Prater made his professional debut in November 2002. Over the next year, he amassed an undefeated record of 10–0. He experienced his first professional loss to Drew Fickett in April 2004. During his early career, Prater collected a notable win when he submitted future WEC Welterweight Champion and UFC Interim Welterweight Champion Carlos Condit by triangle choke.

=== World Extreme Cagefighting ===
In early 2008, Prater again faced Carlos Condit at WEC 32, when Condit was the WEC welterweight champion. In the rematch, Condit won via submission in the first round.

Prater then faced fellow former title challenger Brock Larson at WEC 35. He lost the fight via first-round TKO, and was subsequently released from the promotion.

=== Strikeforce ===
Prater made his Strikeforce debut against Bryan Travers at Strikeforce Challengers: Beerbohm vs. Healy. He won the fight via technical submission in the first round.

=== Ultimate Fighting Championship ===
Prater made his debut for the Ultimate Fighting Championship at UFC 142. He stepped in as a replacement for Siyar Bahadurzada against fellow Brazilian Erick Silva. Prater looked to have originally lost the bout via TKO due to punches at 0:29 seconds in first round. However, Silva was disqualified for landing illegal punches to the back of Prater's head.

Prater faced Canadian T. J. Grant on May 15, 2012, at UFC on Fuel TV: Korean Zombie vs. Poirier. Grant defeated Prater via unanimous decision.

Prater lost to Marcus LeVesseur on October 5, 2012, at UFC on FX 5 via split decision. After this loss, he was subsequently released from the promotion.

=== Legacy FC ===
Prater made his LFC debut on July 22, 2011, when he faced Cameron Dollar at LFC 7. He won the fight via second-round kimura submission. Following a short stint in the UFC, Prater returned to face Carlos Diego Ferreira at LFC 20 on May 31, 2013. Prater lost the fight via unanimous decision.

=== Titan Fighting Championship ===
Prater has signed with Titan Fighting Championship. He made his promotional debut at Titan FC 32 on December 19, 2014, against Rick Hawn and lost the fight by unanimous decision.

== Personal life ==
Prater is divorced since 2016. He has one son and one daughter.

== Championships and accomplishments ==
- Palace Fighting Championship
  - PFC World Lightweight Championship (One time)

== Mixed martial arts record ==
Professional record breakdown
61 matches	35 wins	25 losses
By knockout	3	4
By submission	19	4
By decision	12	17
By disqualification	1	0
Draws	1	

Res.	Record	Opponent	Method	Event	Date	Round	Time	Location	Notes
Loss	35–25–1	Kamil Oniszczuk	TKO (leg kick)	CAVEMMA 4	March 1, 2024	1	0:33	Jastrzębie-Zdrój, Poland	Middleweight debut.
Loss	35–24–1	Alexander Butenko	TKO (submission to strikes)	RFA 5	October 29, 2022	1	1:48	Brno, Czech Republic	
Loss	35–23–1	Nikola Joksović	Decision (unanimous)	FNC Armagedon 3 Semifinals	July 29, 2022	3	5:00	Zabok, Croatia	
Win	35–22–1	Cesar Benitez	Submission (anaconda choke)	Centro Oeste Fight 14	December 11, 2021	1	1:20	Brasília, Brazil	
Loss	34–22–1	Bojan Veličković	TKO (punches)	Oktagon 27	September 11, 2021	1	2:44	Novo Mesto, Slovakia	
Loss	34–21–1	Stefan Sekulić	Decision (unanimous)	Serbian Battle Championship 32	July 24, 2021	3	5:00	Bački Petrovac, Serbia	
Win	34–20–1	Cristiano Bonis	KO (punch)	King of Ring MMA 2	July 20, 2019	1	1:09	Brasília, Brazil	
Loss	33–20–1	Justin Edwards	Submission (guillotine choke)	Premier MMA Championship 9	August 11, 2018	3	1:44	Covington, Kentucky, United States	
Win	33–19–1	Eric Scallan	Submission (arm-triangle choke)	Legacy Fighting Alliance 32	January 26, 2018	2	3:39	Lake Charles, Louisiana, United States	
Win	32–19–1	Evan Samad	Decision (split)	Premier MMA Championship 5: Prater vs. Samad	November 18, 2017	3	5:00	Covington, Kentucky, United States	
Loss	31–19–1	Jason Norwood	Decision (unanimous)	Fury FC 19	September 29, 2017	3	5:00	Humble, Texas, United States	Return to Welterweight.
Loss	31–18–1	Erivan Pereira	Decision (majority)	Aspera FC 45	October 8, 2016	3	5:00	Brasília, Brazil	
Loss	31–17–1	Dylan Fussell	Decision (split)	WSOF Global Championship 1	November 21, 2015	3	5:00	Hainan, China	
Loss	31–16–1	Robert White	Decision (split)	Absolute Action 43	August 29, 2015	3	5:00	Highland Heights, Kentucky, United States	Welterweight bout.
Loss	31–15–1	Rick Hawn	Decision (unanimous)	Titan FC 32	December 19, 2014	3	5:00	Lowell, Massachusetts, United States	
Loss	31–14–1	Carlos Diego Ferreira	Decision (unanimous)	Legacy FC 20: Prater vs. Ferreira	May 31, 2013	3	5:00	Corpus Christi, Texas United States	
Win	31–13–1	Sebastian Latorre	Submission (kimura)	Fight Now Championship	January 25, 2013	1	N/A	Maceió, Brazil	
Loss	30–13–1	Kuniyoshi Hironaka	Decision (unanimous)	Vale Tudo Japan 2012	December 24, 2012	3	5:00	Tokyo, Japan	
Loss	30–12–1	Marcus LeVesseur	Decision (split)	UFC on FX: Browne vs. Bigfoot	October 5, 2012	3	5:00	Minneapolis, Minnesota, United States	
Loss	30–11–1	T. J. Grant	Decision (unanimous)	UFC on Fuel TV: Korean Zombie vs. Poirier	May 15, 2012	3	5:00	Fairfax, Virginia, United States	Return to Lightweight.
Win	30–10–1	Erick Silva	DQ (punches to the back of the head)	UFC 142	January 14, 2012	1	0:29	Rio de Janeiro, Brazil	Welterweight bout.
Win	29–10–1	Gleristone Santos	Submission (arm-triangle choke)	Capital Fight 4	September 6, 2011	2	4:58	Brasília, Brazil	
Win	28–10–1	Cameron Dollar	Submission (kimura)	Legacy FC 7: Prater vs. Dollar	July 22, 2011	2	1:53	Houston, Texas, United States	
Win	27–10–1	Henrique Mello	Submission (rear-naked choke)	International Fighter Championship	April 29, 2011	1	0:50	Recife, Brazil	Lightweight bout.
Win	26–10–1	Bryan Travers	Technical submission (inverted anaconda choke)	Strikeforce Challengers: Beerbohm vs. Healy	February 18, 2011	1	0:38	Cedar Park, Texas, United States	Catchweight bout (160 lb.)
Loss	25–10–1	Reza Madadi	Decision (unanimous)	Superior Challenge 6	October 29, 2010	3	5:00	Stockholm, Sweden	Prater came in 15 lbs overweight.
Loss	25–9–1	Drew Fickett	Submission (rear-naked choke)	Shine: Lightweight Grand Prix	September 10, 2010	1	2:02	Newkirk, Oklahoma, United States	Shine Lightweight Grand PrixTournament Final.
Win	25–8–1	Charlie Brown	Decision (majority)	Shine: Lightweight Grand Prix	September 10, 2010	2	5:00	Newkirk, Oklahoma, United States	Replaced injured Rich Crunkilton in Tournament.
Loss	24–8–1	Richard Crunkilton	Decision (split)	Shine: Lightweight Grand Prix	September 10, 2010	3	5:00	Newkirk, Oklahoma, United States	
Loss	24–7–1	Antonio McKee	Decision (unanimous)	MFC 22	October 2, 2009	3	5:00	Edmonton, Canada	Non-title bout; Prater failed to make weight.
Win	24–6–1	Dominique Robinson	Decision (unanimous)	PFC 13: Validation	May 8, 2009	5	3:00	Lemoore, California, United States	Won vacant PFC World Lightweight Championship.
Loss	23–6–1	Brock Larson	TKO (punches)	WEC 35: Condit vs. Miura	August 3, 2008	1	0:37	Las Vegas, Nevada, United States	
Win	23–5–1	Garett Davis	Decision (unanimous)	Raw Combat: Resurrection	June 20, 2008	3	5:00	Calgary, Canada	
Win	22–5–1	Marcelo Brito	Decision (unanimous)	UWC: Invasion	April 26, 2008	3	5:00	Fairfax, Virginia, United States	
Loss	21–5–1	Carlos Condit	Submission (guillotine choke)	WEC 32: Condit vs. Prater	February 13, 2008	1	3:48	Rio Rancho, New Mexico, United States	For WEC Welterweight Championship.
Win	21–4–1	Keith Wisniewski	Decision (split)	Art of War 3	September 1, 2007	3	5:00	Dallas, Texas, United States	
Win	20–4–1	Anthony Lapsley	Decision (unanimous)	Art of War 1	March 9, 2007	3	5:00	Dallas, Texas, United States	
Win	19–4–1	Marlon Mathias	TKO (stomps)	Storm Samurai 12	November 25, 2006	1	4:55	Curitiba, Brazil	
Loss	18–4–1	Derrick Noble	Decision (unanimous)	Mix FC: Boardwalk Blitz	March 4, 2006	3	5:00	Atlantic City, New Jersey, United States	
Win	18–3–1	Pat Healy	Submission (arm-triangle choke)	Euphoria: USA vs. Japan	November 5, 2005	2	3:57	Atlantic City, New Jersey, United States	
Win	17–3–1	Adam Arredondo	Submission (rear-naked choke)	IFC: Rumble on the Rio 2	October 15, 2005	1	3:03	McAllen, Texas, United States	
Loss	16–3–1	Keith Wisniewski	Decision (unanimous)	FFC 15: Fiesta Las Vegas	September 14, 2005	3	5:00	Las Vegas, Nevada, United States	
Win	16–2–1	Claudionor Fontinelle	Submission (anaconda choke)	Meca World Vale Tudo 12	July 9, 2005	1	3:52	Rio de Janeiro, Brazil	
Win	15–2–1	Mikey Gomez	Decision (unanimous)	Absolute Fighting Championships 11	February 12, 2005	2	5:00	Fort Lauderdale, Florida, United States	
Loss	14–2–1	Keith Wisniewski	Decision (unanimous)	Freestyle Fighting Championships 13	December 10, 2004	3	5:00	Biloxi, Mississippi, United States	
Win	14–1–1	Thomas Schulte	Decision (unanimous)	Fightworld 3	November 27, 2004	3	5:00	Albuquerque, New Mexico, United States	
Win	13–1–1	Efrain Ruiz	Decision (unanimous)	Absolute Fighting Championships 10	October 30, 2004	2	5:00	Fort Lauderdale, Florida, United States	
Win	12–1–1	Carlos Condit	Submission (triangle choke)	Fightworld 2	September 11, 2004	1	2:51	Albuquerque, New Mexico, United States	
Win	11–1–1	Spencer Fisher	Decision (unanimous)	Freestyle Fighting Championships 9	May 14, 2004	3	5:00	Biloxi, Mississippi, United States	
Loss	10–1–1	Drew Fickett	Submission (guillotine choke)	Rage on the River	April 17, 2004	3	2:25	Redding, California, United States	
Draw	10–0–1	Sauli Heilimo	Draw	Absolute Fighting Championships 7	February 27, 2004	2	5:00	Fort Lauderdale, Florida, United States	
Win	10–0	Melvin Guillard	Submission (guillotine choke)	Freestyle Fighting Championships 7	December 19, 2003	1	2:32	Biloxi, Mississippi, United States	
Win	9–0	Andrew Chappelle	Decision	IFC: Rumble on the Rio	December 6, 2003	3	5:00	Hidalgo, Texas, United States	
Win	8–0	Chris Mills	Submission (guillotine choke)	Reality Fighting Championships 2	May 10, 2003	1	1:04	Oklahoma City, Oklahoma, United States	
Win	7–0	Lee King	Submission (armbar)	Renegades Extreme Fighting	April 18, 2003	1	N/A	Houston, Texas, United States	
Win	6–0	Adam Arredondo	TKO (injury)	Renegades Extreme Fighting	April 18, 2003	1	0:17	Houston, Texas, United States	
Win	5–0	Lee King	Submission (guillotine choke)	Renegades Extreme Fighting	February 1, 2003	1	1:04	Houston, Texas, United States	
Win	4–0	Jeremiah O'Neal	Submission (armbar)	Renegades Extreme Fighting	February 1, 2003	1	1:22	Houston, Texas, United States	
Win	3–0	Teo Baumgardner	Submission (guillotine choke)	Reality Fighting Championships 1	January 25, 2003	1	4:22	Oklahoma City, Oklahoma, United States	
Win	2–0	Andrew Chappelle	Submission (rear-naked choke)	Talon Challenge 3	November 1, 2002	N/A	N/A	Corpus Christi, Texas, United States	
Win	1–0	Frank Alcala	Submission (armbar)	Talon Challenge 3	November 1, 2002	N/A	N/A	Corpus Christi, Texas, United States	

== Amateur mixed martial arts record ==
Professional record breakdown
1 match	0 wins	1 loss
By knockout	0	1
By submission	0	0
By decision	0	0

Res.	Record	Opponent	Method	Event	Date	Round	Time	Location	Notes
Loss	0–1	David Hargrove	TKO (punches)	Unified Shoot Wrestling Federation 8	March 28, 1998	1	1:40	Texas, United States	
