= Reza Madadi =

Iranian-Swedish mixed martial artist (born 1978)

Gholam Reza Madadi
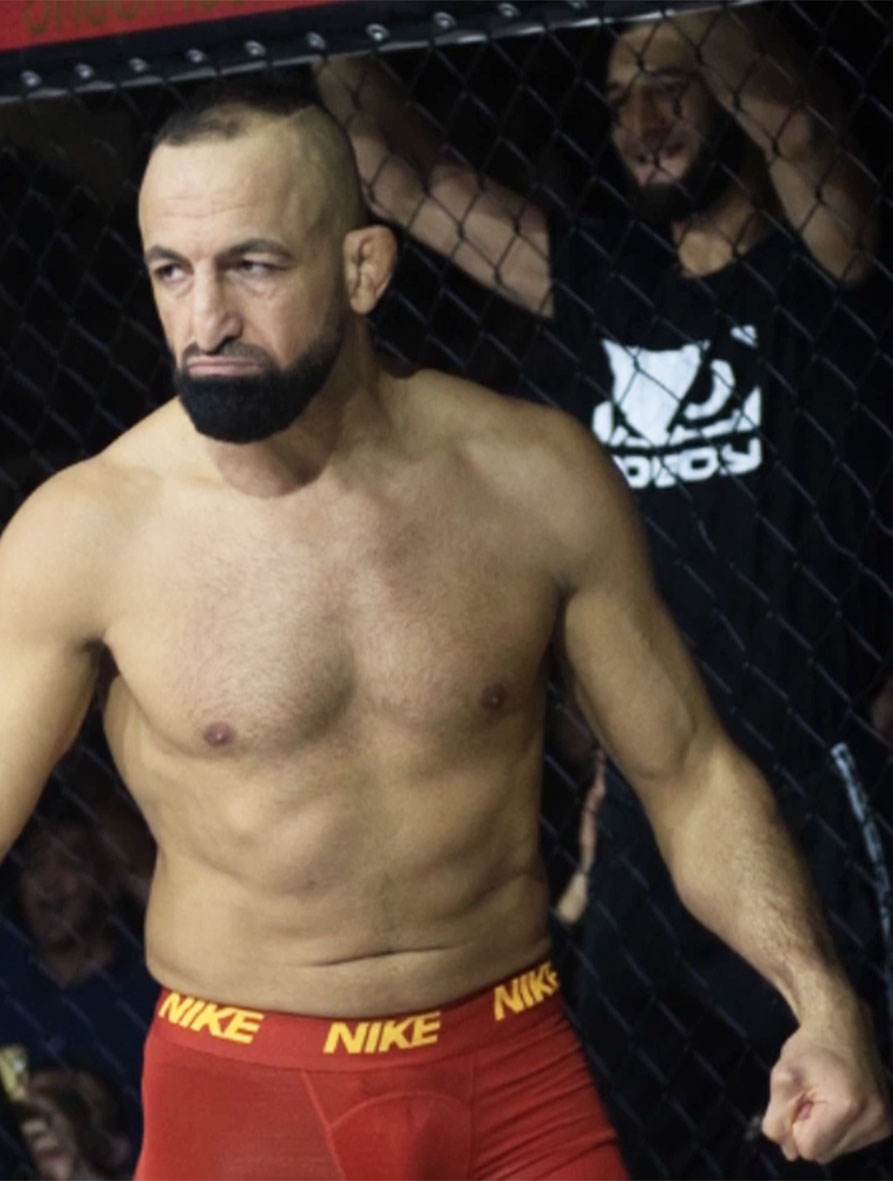
- Reza Madadi
- Born: Gholam Reza Madadi; June 20, 1978 (age 48); Tehran, Iran
- Native name: رضا مددی
- Other names: Mad Dog
- Nationality: Swedish
- Height: 5 ft 10 in (1.78 m)
- Weight: 155 lb (70 kg; 11.1 st)
- Division: Lightweight (from 2010); Welterweight (2006–2010)
- Reach: 73.0 in (185 cm)
- Fighting out of: Stockholm, Sweden
- Team: Allstars Training Center; Hilti NHB; Spårvägens BK (Wrestling)
- Rank: Purple belt in Brazilian Jiu-Jitsu
- Wrestling: Gold medal Swedish Freestyle Wrestling Champion
- Years active: 2006–2019 (MMA); 1994–2006 (Wrestling)

Mixed martial arts record
- Total: 20
- Wins: 14
- By knockout: 3
- By submission: 8
- By decision: 3
- Losses: 6
- By decision: 6

Other information
- Website: https://www.facebook.com/MadDog.Madadi
- Mixed martial arts record from Sherdog
- Last updated on: April 6, 2013

Reza Madadi (Persian: رضا مددی; born 20 June 1978) is a retired Iranian-Swedish mixed martial artist who competed in the lightweight division. A professional mixed martial artist from 2006 to 2019, Madadi is best known for competing in the Ultimate Fighting Championship.

== Mixed martial arts career ==
=== Early career ===
Madadi started out as a wrestler at the age of 10, his wrestling career saw some good results, winning the Swedish championship in 2002 and 2003 along with victories in Sweden and other parts of Scandinavia, in both the styles of Greco-Roman and Freestyle. He transitioned from wrestling to MMA in 2006.

Madadi competed in Strike And Submit (SAS), Superior Challenge (SC), Furious Fighting Championship (FFC) and a few other fighting organizations. Madadi holds a submission victory over former UFC fighter Junie Browning in 2010, later that year he took a very impressive decision victory against former WEC- and future Strikeforce and UFC fighter Carlo Prater.

He became the Superior Challenge Lightweight Champion in 2011, after defeating former UFC fighter Rich Clementi via unanimous decision at Superior Challenge 7.

He was expected to challenge for the title in British top promotion Cage Warriors, against the champion Matt Veach on June 16, 2011. However, just a few days before the fight Veach had to withdraw due to an injury and Madadi was scrapped from the card.

Madadi's success on the European circuit, 11-2 (6 submissions, 2 TKO's), led to him being considered as one of the best European lightweight prospects.

=== Ultimate Fighting Championship ===
In November, 2011 it was reported that Madadi had signed with the UFC.

He was expected to make his promotional debut against Rafaello Oliveira on January 20, 2012 at UFC on FX 1. However, Oliveira was forced out of a bout with an injury and replaced by Fabrício Camões Madadi himself would later withdraw from the bout due to injury as well and was replaced by promotional newcomer Tommy Hayden.

In his eventual debut, Madadi faced fellow promotional newcomer Yoislandy Izquierdo on April 14, 2012 at UFC on Fuel TV 2. After being stunned in the first round, Madadi defeated Izquierdo by submission due to a guillotine choke in the second round.

In his next fight for the UFC, Madadi faced Cristiano Marcello on October 13, 2012 at UFC 153. He lost via a controversial split decision. The decision was controversial since most major MMA media outlets scored the bout for Madadi.

Madadi faced Michael Johnson on April 6, 2013 at UFC on Fuel TV 9. After a back-and-forth two rounds, where Johnson stunned and dropped Madadi with a headkick late in the first round, Madadi recovered fast and won the fight via submission due to a d'arce choke in the third round. The win also garnered Madadi his first Submission of the Night bonus award.

Madadi was expected to fight Michael Chiesa on July 27, 2013 at UFC on Fox 8. However, on May 14, 2013, it was announced Madadi pulled out of the bout citing alleged visa issues and was replaced by Jorge Masvidal.

Following Madadi's conviction on burglary charges, the UFC officially released Madadi from the promotion.

=== Post-UFC ===
After leaving the UFC following, and still awaiting his sentencing for his robbery conviction, Madadi expressed an interest to go back and fight in the Sweden-based organisation Superior Challenge, in which he held the lightweight title before he got the call from UFC. On November 23, 2013 at Superior Challenge 9, Madadi entered the cage and called out fellow former UFC-fighter Anton Kuivanen, who fought earlier that evening, defeating one of Madadi's training partners.

He was set to return to the cage on May 3, 2014 at Superior Challenge 10, his opponent was yet to be announced. Later news came that his opponent would be Efraín Escudero and that the fight would be Madadi's first defense of his Superior Challenge Lightweight title, which he won back in 2011. However, Madadi later had to withdraw due to an injury and was replaced by Juha-Pekka Vainikainen.

=== UFC return ===
On June 10, 2015 it was announced by Madadi and his management that he was back in the UFC.

Madadi faced Norman Parke on October 24, 2015 at UFC Fight Night 76. He lost the fight by unanimous decision.

He fought Yan Cabral on May 8, 2016 at UFC Fight Night 87. Madadi won the fight by TKO after connecting with an uppercut and follow up punches in round 3.

Madadi was expected to face Rustam Khabilov on September 3, 2016 at UFC Fight Night 93. However on July 25, Madadi pulled out due to undisclosed reasons and was replaced by Leandro Silva. It was later revealed that Madadi had been forced to withdraw due to a heart-related illness. The illness, called myocarditis, causes an inflammation in the heart muscle which can have various consequences depending on the state of the illness and the person who suffers from it. He wasn't in serious danger but would still have to be sidelined from training until doctors had figured out a solution to his problems.

He was then expected to face promotional newcomer Marc Diakiese on October 8, 2016 at UFC 204. However, Madadi was later forced to withdraw from the contest, after suffering an eye injury that need an emergency surgery. He was replaced by Lukasz Sajewski.

Madadi faced Joseph Duffy on March 18, 2017 at UFC Fight Night 107. He lost the fight by unanimous decision.

Shortly after his fight against Joseph Duffy, Madadi took to his Instagram page to reveal that he had one fight left on his UFC contract and that it possibly would be the last fight of his career. He expressed wishes to get his potential last fight on the upcoming UFC Fight Night 109 in his hometown of Stockholm, Sweden.

Madadi got his wish fulfilled in the last minute, as he stepped in on short notice, replacing an injured Mairbek Taisumov, against Joaquim Silva on May 28, 2017 at UFC Fight Night 109. He lost fight by split decision. Subsequent to this fight, Madadi opted to not renew his contract with the UFC.

=== Absolute Championship Berkut and retirement ===
Despite contemplating retirement from MMA, Madadi signed a multi-fight contract with Absolute Championship Berkut. On July 4, 2017 it was announced that Madadi was set to face Yusup Raisov, who vacated his ACB featherweight title and moved up to lightweight division. The fight was planned to take place in the main event at ACB 92 in Malmö, Sweden on August 25, 2018. However, on July 30, 2018 it was announced that the event would be cancelled due to ACB having financial problems.

In May 2019, Madadi announced his retirement from competition, stating that he will be concentrating on coaching mixed martial arts.

Madadi is still training and coaching at his long time gym Allstar Training Center in Torrevieja (Spain), along with UFC fighters such as Alexander Gustafsson, Ilir Latifi, Jimi Manuwa, David Teymur and Khamzat Chimaev.

== Personal life ==
Madadi is married. He and his wife, Kate, have two sons. Their first child was born in 2013 and the second in 2015.

In August 2012, Madadi saved a baby and father from drowning in a lake outside of his hometown of Stockholm, Sweden.

Madadi acts in one of the roles in the Swedish movie Tommy (2014).

=== Aggravated burglary and prison sentence ===
On May 27, 2013, Madadi was arrested in Sweden for burglary. Swedish tabloid Expressen reported that the fighter and an accomplice broke into a designer handbag store before making off with $150,000 (U.S.) worth of stolen goods. Madadi and the accomplice were apprehended and faced charges of aggravated theft and abetting larceny, according to Swedish authorities. On August 16, 2013 Madadi was found guilty for aggravated burglary and sentenced to 18 months in prison. An appeal from Madadi was filed on September 5, 2013, and he was released from custody awaiting notice from the Swedish court of law. In the second trial, he was again found guilty, and no attempt for a second appeal was made. In March, 2015 after serving the active time of 14 months, the sentence was completed and Madadi was released from prison.

== Championships and accomplishments ==
=== Mixed Martial Arts ===
- Ultimate Fighting Championship
  - Submission of the Night (One time) vs. Michael Johnson
  - UFC.com Awards
    - 2013: Ranked #9 Upset of the Year vs. Michael Johnson
- Superior Challenge
  - Superior Challenge Lightweight Championship (One time; First)
- X-Fight FC
  - X-Fight FC Welterweight Championship (One time; First)
- Nordic MMA Awards - MMAviking.com
  - 2016 Comeback Fighter of the Year

=== Submission Wrestling ===
- Swedish Submission Wrestling Federation
  - 2010 Swedish National Championship (bronze) (-79 kg / 174 lbs)
  - 2010 Eskilstuna Submission Wrestling Tournament Winner (-75 kg / 165 lbs)

=== Amateur wrestling ===
- Swedish Wrestling Federation
  - 2002 Swedish National Championship, Freestyle (gold) (-69 kg)
  - 2003 Swedish National Championship, Freestyle (gold) (-69 kg)

== Mixed martial arts record ==
Professional record breakdown
20 matches	14 wins	6 losses
By knockout	3	0
By submission	8	0
By decision	3	6

Res.	Record	Opponent	Method	Event	Date	Round	Time	Location	Notes
Loss	14–6	Joaquim Silva	Decision (split)	UFC Fight Night: Gustafsson vs. Teixeira	May 28, 2017	3	5:00	Stockholm, Sweden	
Loss	14–5	Joe Duffy	Decision (unanimous)	UFC Fight Night: Manuwa vs. Anderson	March 18, 2017	3	5:00	London, England	
Win	14–4	Yan Cabral	TKO (punches)	UFC Fight Night: Overeem vs. Arlovski	May 8, 2016	3	1:56	Rotterdam, Netherlands	
Loss	13–4	Norman Parke	Decision (unanimous)	UFC Fight Night: Holohan vs. Smolka	October 24, 2015	3	5:00	Dublin, Ireland	
Win	13–3	Michael Johnson	Submission (D'Arce choke)	UFC on Fuel TV: Mousasi vs. Latifi	April 6, 2013	3	1:33	Stockholm, Sweden	Submission of the Night.
Loss	12–3	Cristiano Marcello	Decision (split)	UFC 153	October 13, 2012	3	5:00	Rio de Janeiro, Brazil	
Win	12–2	Yoislandy Izquierdo	Submission (guillotine choke)	UFC on Fuel TV: Gustafsson vs. Silva	April 14, 2012	2	1:28	Stockholm, Sweden	
Win	11–2	Rich Clementi	Decision (unanimous)	Superior Challenge 7	April 30, 2011	3	5:00	Stockholm, Sweden	Won the SC Lightweight Championship.
Win	10–2	Carlo Prater	Decision (unanimous)	Superior Challenge 6	October 29, 2010	3	5:00	Stockholm, Sweden	Catchweight (165 lbs) bout; Prater missed weight.
Win	9–2	Junie Browning	Submission (guillotine choke)	Superior Challenge 5	May 1, 2010	2	0:22	Stockholm, Sweden	Lightweight debut.
Win	8–2	Andy Walker	TKO (punches)	Superior Challenge 4	October 31, 2009	1	1:11	Stockholm, Sweden	
Win	7–2	Raymond Jarman	Submission (arm-triangle choke)	Superior Challenge 3	May 30, 2009	1	1:00	Stockholm, Sweden	
Win	6–2	Oriol Gaset	Submission (guillotine choke)	Furious Fighting Championship 2	February 21, 2009	1	2:38	Casablanca, Morocco	
Loss	5–2	Peter Irving	Decision (unanimous)	Strike and Submit 7	July 13, 2008	3	5:00	Gateshead, England	For the SAS European Welterweight Championship.
Win	5–1	Aidan Marron	Decision (unanimous)	Superior Challenge 1	May 4, 2008	3	5:00	Stockholm, Sweden	
Win	4–1	Peter Wilson	Submission (armbar)	X-Fight FC 1	March 30, 2008	1	0:48	Sunderland, England	Won the X-Fight FC Welterweight Championship.
Win	3–1	Romano de los Reyes	Submission (triangle choke)	Slamm: Holland vs Thailand 3	May 6, 2007	1	1:04	Almere, Netherlands	
Win	2–1	Geroid McNichol	Submission (armbar)	Strike and Submit 1	January 28, 2007	3	1:28	Gateshead, England	
Win	1–1	Christian Johansson	TKO (punches)	Travelfight Arena 1	December 16, 2006	2	3:30	Uppsala, Sweden	
Loss	0–1	Ville Manninen	Decision (unanimous)	ZST: Prestige	September 23, 2006	3	5:00	Turku, Finland	

== Grappling record ==
8 Matches, 7 Wins (3 Submissions)
Result	Rec.	Opponent	Method	Event	Division	Date	Location
Win	7-1	(Israel) Ben Shimol	Points	AK Fighting Championships 2	-77 kg Superfight	November 16, 2019	Solna, Stockholm County, Sweden
Win	6–1	(Sweden) Andreas Karlsson	Points	Swedish National Championships 2010	-79 kg Absolute	September 13, 2010	Uppsala, Sweden
Win	5–1	(Sweden) Jan Sundberg	Submission (heel hook)	Swedish National Championships 2010	-79 kg Absolute	September 13, 2010	Uppsala, Sweden
Win	4–1	(Sweden) Jonas Cullemark	Submission (guillotine choke)	Eskilstuna Submission Wrestling Tournament 2010	-75 kg Absolute, Finals	February 14, 2010	Eskilstuna, Sweden
Win	3–1	(Sweden) Omid Albazi	Points	Eskilstuna Submission Wrestling Tournament 2010	-75 kg Absolute	February 14, 2010	Eskilstuna, Sweden
Win	2–1	(Sweden) Jimmy Svensson	Points	Eskilstuna Submission Wrestling Tournament 2010	-75 kg Absolute	February 14, 2010	Eskilstuna, Sweden
Win	1–1	(Finland) Manne Byrman	Submission (standing guillotine choke)	Eskilstuna Submission Wrestling Tournament 2010	-75 kg Absolute	February 14, 2010	Eskilstuna, Sweden
Loss	0–1	(Sweden) Johan Westerberg	Submission (rear-naked choke)	Grapplers Paradise 4	-77 kg Superfight	September 21, 2008	Uppsala, Sweden
