= UFC Fight Night: Gustafsson vs. Teixeira =

UFC mixed martial arts event in 2017

- The poster for UFC Fight Night: Gustafsson vs. Teixeira
- Promotion: Ultimate Fighting Championship
- Date: May 28, 2017
- Venue: Ericsson Globe
- City: Stockholm, Sweden
- Attendance: 12,668
- Total gate: $1,920,000

Event chronology
UFC 211: Miocic vs. Dos Santos	UFC Fight Night: Gustafsson vs. Teixeira	UFC 212: Aldo vs. Holloway

UFC Fight Night: Gustafsson vs. Teixeira (also known as UFC Fight Night 109) was a mixed martial arts event produced by the Ultimate Fighting Championship held on May 28, 2017, at Ericsson Globe in Stockholm, Sweden.

== Background ==
Preliminary reports indicated that the event was expected to be contested at the newly opened Royal Arena in Copenhagen, which would have marked the promotion's first visit to Denmark. However, on February 28, the promotion announced that the event would take place in Stockholm.

A light heavyweight bout between former UFC Light Heavyweight Championship challengers Alexander Gustafsson and Glover Teixeira served as the main event. The pairing was previously scheduled to headline UFC Fight Night 69 in June 2015. However, Gustafsson pulled out of that fight due to injury.

Magnus Cedenblad was expected to face Chris Camozzi at the event. However, Cedenblad was removed from the card on March 27 and was replaced by Trevor Smith.

Emil Weber Meek was expected to face Nordine Taleb at the event. However, Meek pulled out of the fight on May 12 citing injury. He was replaced by promotional newcomer Oliver Enkamp.

A heavyweight bout between Christian Colombo and Damian Grabowski was expected to take place at the event. However, the pairing was scrapped as both fighters sustained injuries in the weeks leading up to the event.

Mairbek Taisumov was expected to face Joaquim Silva at the event. However, Taisumov pulled out of the fight on May 16 citing a knee injury. He was replaced by Reza Madadi.

At the weigh-ins, Darren Till came in at 176 lb, five pounds over the welterweight limit of 171 lb. As a result, he was fined 20% of his purse, which went to his opponent Jessin Ayari and the bout proceeded at a catchweight.

== Results ==
Main Card (Fox Sports 1)
Weight class				Method	Round	Time	Notes
Light Heavyweight	Alexander Gustafsson	def.	Glover Teixeira	KO (punches)	5	1:07
Light Heavyweight	Volkan Oezdemir	def.	Misha Cirkunov	TKO (punch)	1	0:28
Welterweight	Peter Sobotta	def.	Ben Saunders	TKO (punches and knee)	2	2:29
Welterweight	Omari Akhmedov	def.	Abdul Razak Alhassan	Decision (split) (30–27, 28–29, 30–27)	3	5:00
Welterweight	Nordine Taleb	def.	Oliver Enkamp	Decision (unanimous) (30–27, 30–27, 29–28)	3	5:00
Middleweight	Jack Hermansson	def.	Alex Nicholson	TKO (punches)	1	2:00
Preliminary Card (Fox Sports 1)
Bantamweight	Pedro Munhoz	def.	Damian Stasiak	Decision (unanimous) (30–27, 29–28, 29–28)	3	5:00
Middleweight	Trevor Smith	def.	Chris Camozzi	Decision (unanimous) (30–27, 30–26, 30–26)	3	5:00
Lightweight	Joaquim Silva	def.	Reza Madadi	Decision (split) (29–28, 28–29, 29–28)	3	5:00
Welterweight	Bojan Veličković	def.	Nico Musoke	TKO (punches)	3	4:37
Preliminary Card (UFC Fight Pass)
Catchweight (176 lb)	Darren Till	def.	Jessin Ayari	Decision (unanimous) (30–27, 30–27, 29–27)	3	5:00
Lightweight	Damir Hadžović	def.	Marcin Held	KO (knee)	3	0:07

During the post-fight interview Alexander Gustafsson proposed to his girlfriend.

== Bonus awards ==
The following fighters were awarded $50,000 bonuses:

- Fight of the Night: Alexander Gustafsson vs. Glover Teixeira
- Performance of the Night: Bojan Veličković and Damir Hadžović

== See also ==
- List of UFC events
- 2017 in UFC
