= Dragoje Leković =

Serbian former footballer (born 1967)

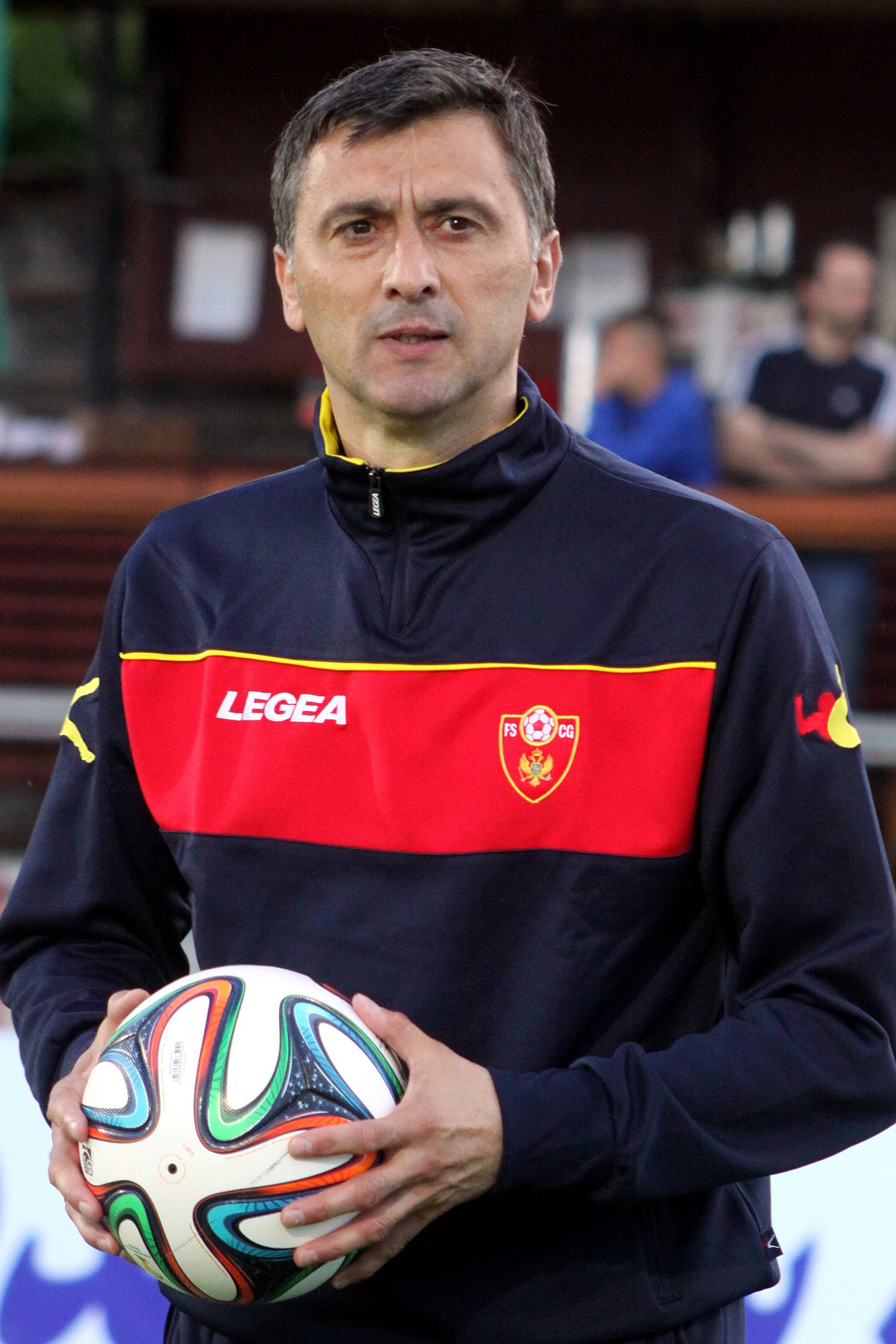
- Leković in 2014

Personal information
- Date of birth: 21 November 1967 (age 58)
- Place of birth: Sivac, SR Serbia, SFR Yugoslavia
- Height: 1.86 m (6 ft 1 in)
- Position: Goalkeeper

Youth career
- Skoj Sivac
- Mornar
- 1984–1985: Budućnost Titograd

Senior career*
Years	Team	Apps	(Gls)
1985–1991	Budućnost Titograd	109	(3)
1991–1992	Red Star Belgrade	17	(0)
1992–1993	Mogren	23	(0)
1994	Budućnost Titograd	24	(0)
1994–1998	Kilmarnock	96	(0)
1998	Sporting Gijón	5	(0)
1998–2000	Málaga	7	(0)
2002–2003	AEK Larnaca	24	(0)
Total		305	(3)

International career
1987	SFR Yugoslavia U20	6	(0)
1990	SFR Yugoslavia U21	6	(0)
1988–1998	FR Yugoslavia (Note: Including 4 caps for SFR Yugoslavia.)	14	(0)

Managerial career
- 2011–2019: Montenegro (assistant)
- 2019–2021: Al-Gharafa (assistant)
Medal record
Representing Yugoslavia
Gold medal – first place	FIFA U-20 World Cup	1987
Silver medal – second place	UEFA U-21 Euro	1990
- * Club domestic league appearances and goals

Dragoje Leković (Serbian Cyrillic: Драгоје Лековић, pronounced [drâɡoje lêːkoʋitɕ]; born 21 November 1967) is a retired professional footballer who played as a goalkeeper.

== Club career ==
Leković was born in Sivac, SR Serbia, SFR Yugoslavia. He mostly played for Yugoslav First League club FK Budućnost Titograd and also spent one season with the well known club, Red Star Belgrade. Leković played in 17 of 30 matches in the 1991–92 Yugoslav First League and also started both legs of the 1991–92 Yugoslav Cup finals, losing out to FK Partizan.

After 18 months with modest club FK Mogren and a brief comeback spell at Budućnost, Leković joined Kilmarnock in Scotland in fall 1994, where he was the first choice goalkeeper during his spell and was part of the squad that won the 1997 Scottish Cup versus Falkirk at Ibrox Stadium. with the only goal of the game scored in the 20th minute by Paul Wright.

In January 1998, Leković started an unassuming stint in Spain, where he experienced relegation from La Liga and promotion from the Second Division respectively with Sporting de Gijón and Málaga CF but was only second-choice goalkeeper at both clubs. Leković closed out his career at the age of 36 after playing for AEK Larnaca.

== International career ==
Leković gained 14 caps for Yugoslavia with his debut on 27 April 1988 resulting in a 2–0 friendly defeat to Republic of Ireland.

Lekovic was in the country's final roster for two FIFA World Cups: 1990 and 1998 but did not see a single minute of action at either tournament as he was the third choice goalkeeper. He was also called to UEFA Euro 1992, but the nation would be suspended due to the Yugoslav Wars.

Previously, Leković was a member of the highly talented Yugoslavia under-20 team that won the 1987 FIFA World Youth Championship in Chile, playing all the games in the tournament.

== Career statistics ==
Appearances and goals by national team and year
National team	Year	Apps	Goals
SFR Yugoslavia	1988	2	0
SFR Yugoslavia	1989	1	0
SFR Yugoslavia	1990	0	0
SFR Yugoslavia	1991	1	0
SFR Yugoslavia	1992	0	0
FR Yugoslavia	1993	— (Note: FR Yugoslavia was banned from international football due to UN sanctions.)	
FR Yugoslavia	1994	0	0
FR Yugoslavia	1995	0	0
FR Yugoslavia	1996	0	0
FR Yugoslavia	1997	6	0
FR Yugoslavia	1998	4	0
Total		14	0
