= Nikola Joksović =

Serbian mixed martial artist (born 1994)

- Born: September 11, 1994 (age 32); Sivac, Serbia, FR Yugoslavia
- Native name: Никола Јоксовић
- Height: 6 ft 1 in (1.85 m)
- Weight: 171 lb (78 kg; 12 st 3 lb)
- Division: Welterweight (2017–present); Middleweight (2019)
- Reach: 72.8 in (185 cm)
- Fighting out of: Novi Sad, Serbia
- Team: Borilački klub CDS Novi Sad
- Years active: 2017–present

Mixed martial arts record
- Total: 18
- Wins: 16
- By knockout: 6
- By submission: 9
- By decision: 1
- Losses: 1
- By decision: 1
- No contests: 1

Other information
- Mixed martial arts record from Sherdog

Nikola Joksović (Serbian: Никола Јоксовић; born September 11, 1994) is a Serbian professional mixed martial artist. He currently competes in the Welterweight division for Brave Combat Federation. Joksović is a former FNC Welterweight champion.

== Professional career ==
=== Early career ===
Joksović made his professional debut on August 19, 2017 against Igor Cirić. Joksović won the fight via a first-round TKO.

=== Megdan Fighting ===
After accumulating a record of 3–0, Joksović made his debut with Serbian promotion Megdan Fighting on June 27, 2019, where he faced Milan Radaković. Joksović won the fight via a second-round submission.

His next fight came on December 9, 2019 against Marko Radaković. Joksović won the fight via a second-round knockout.

His next fight came on October 14, 2020 against Bojan Kosednar. Joksović won the fight via a second-round submission.

His last fight with the federation came on June 13, 2021 against Marko Varđan. Joksović won the fight via a second-round TKO.

=== Ares FC and Fight Nation Championship ===
Joksović made his debut with French promotion Ares FC on March 10, 2022 against Karim Rabei. Rabei initially won the fight, but the result was later overturned to a no contest after Rabei failed an anti-doping test.

Joksović made his debut with Croatian promotion Fight Nation Championship on July 29, 2022 against Carlo Prater. Joksović won the fight via unanimous decision.

His next fight came on December 23, 2022 against Jorge de Oliveira. Joksović won the fight via a second-round submission.

He returned to Ares FC on March 9, 2023 against Emmanuel Dawa. Joksović won the fight via a first-round TKO.

His next fight came on May 11, 2023 against Vincent del Guerra. Joksović won the fight via a second-round submission.

==== FNC Welterweight champion ====
Joksović returned to Fight Nation Championship on September 2, 2023. He faced Marko Kisič for the vacant FNC Welterweight championship. Joksović won the fight via a second-round TKO, and thus won his first career championship.

His first title defense came on November 4, 2023 against Savo Lazić. Joksović won the fight via a second-round submission.

His second and final title defense came on June 1, 2024 against Stefan Negucić. Joksović won the fight via a second-round submission.

==== Final fights in Ares FC ====
Joksović returned to Ares FC on October 24, 2024 against Ramazan Mustafaev. Joksović won the fight via a third-round submission. This performance earned him his first career Submission of the Night bonus.

His final fight with the federation came on June 20, 2025 against Jose Barrios Vargas. Joksović won the fight via a first-round TKO.

=== Brave Combat Federation ===
Joksović signed with Bahrain-based promotion Brave Combat Federation on September 11, 2025.

He made his promotional debut on February 14, 2026, against Luciano Palhano. Joksović lost the fight via a Unanimous Decision, suffering his first career defeat.

== Championships and accomplishments ==
=== Mixed martial arts ===
- Fight Nation Championship
  - FNC Welterweight championship (One time; former)
    - Two successful title defense
- Ares Fighting Championship
  - Submission of the Night (One time)

== Mixed martial arts record ==
Professional record breakdown
18 matches	16 wins	1 loss
By knockout	6	0
By submission	9	0
By decision	1	1
No contests	1	

Res.	Record	Opponent	Method	Event	Date	Round	Time	Location	Notes
Loss	16–1 (1)	Luciano Palhano	Decision (unanimous)	Brave CF 104	February 14, 2026	3	5:00	Belgrade, Serbia	Super Welterweight debut.
Win	16–0 (1)	Jose Barrios Vargas	TKO (punches)	Ares FC 32	June 20, 2025	1	1:14	Brest, France	
Win	15–0 (1)	Ramazan Mustafaev	Submission (triangle choke)	Ares FC 26	October 24, 2024	3	1:42	Aubervilliers, France	Submission of the Night.
Win	14–0 (1)	Stefan Negucić	Submission (arm-triangle choke)	FNC 17	June 1, 2024	2	5:00	Belgrade, Serbia	Defended the FNC Welterweight Championship.
Win	13–0 (1)	Savo Lazić	Submission (rear-naked choke)	FNC 13	November 4, 2023	2	3:29	Belgrade, Serbia	Defended the FNC Welterweight Championship.
Win	12–0 (1)	Marko Kisič	TKO (punches)	FNC 12	September 2, 2023	2	0:40	Pula, Croatia	Won the vacant FNC Welterweight Championship.
Win	11–0 (1)	Vincent del Guerra	Submission (armbar)	Ares FC 15	May 11, 2023	2	3:05	Paris, France	
Win	10–0 (1)	Emmanuel Dawa	TKO (punches)	Ares FC 13	March 9, 2023	1	2:55	Paris, France	
Win	9–0 (1)	Jorge de Oliveira	Submission (arm-triangle choke)	FNC 9	December 23, 2022	2	3:20	Sisak, Croatia	
Win	8–0 (1)	Carlo Prater	Decision (unanimous)	FNC Armagedon 3 Semifinals	July 29, 2022	3	5:00	Zabok, Croatia	
NC	7–0 (1)	Karim Rabei	NC (overturned)	Ares FC 4	March 10, 2022	3	5:00	Paris, France	Originally a unanimous decision win for Rabei; overturned after he tested positive for banned substance.
Win	7–0	Marko Varđan	TKO (punches)	Megdan Fighting 9	June 13, 2021	2	2:56	Šabac, Serbia	
Win	6–0	Bojan Kosednar	Submission (triangle choke)	Megdan Fighting 7	October 14, 2020	2	1:31	Novi Sad, Serbia	Return to Welterweight.
Win	5–0	Marko Radaković	KO (punches)	Megdan Fighting 6	December 9, 2019	2	0:11	Belgrade, Serbia	
Win	4–0	Milan Radaković	Submission (rear-naked choke)	Megdan Fighting 5	June 27, 2019	2	4:01	Mitrovica, Kosovo	Middleweight debut.
Win	3–0	Péter Guzsván	Submission (triangle choke)	Hungarian MMA Federation: 2018 WHB Magyar Profi MMA Cup	April 28, 2018	3	3:06	Győr, Hungary	
Win	2–0	Vladimir Cvetković	Submission (triangle choke)	Athletic FC 1	February 18, 2018	1	3:31	Zlatibor, Serbia	
Win	1–0	Igor Cirić	TKO (punches)	Jedinstvo Brčko Sport Club: Brčko Fight Night 5	August 19, 2017	1	3:24	Brčko, Bosnia and Herzegovina	Welterweight debut.
