= Church of St. Nicholas, Sivac =

Church of St. Nicholas
- Црква светог Николе; Crkva svetog Nikole
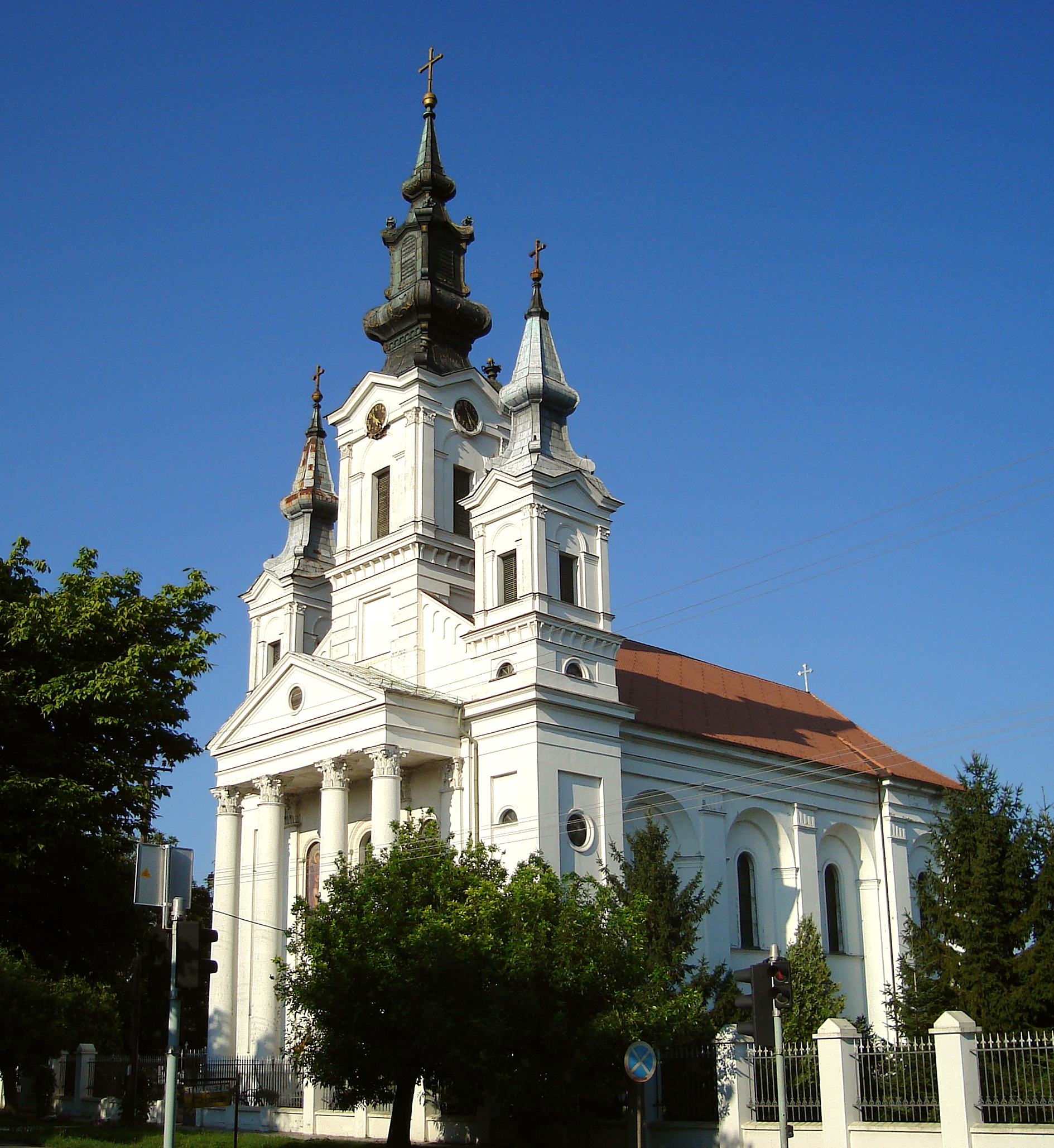
- Church of St Nicholas
- Church of St. Nicholas
- 45°41′57″N 19°22′52″E
- Location: Sivac, Vojvodina
- Country: Serbia
- Denomination: Serbian Orthodox

History
- Status: Church
- Dedication: Saint Nicholas

Architecture
- Functional status: Active
- Style: Neo-classicism
- Years built: 1873

Administration
- Archdiocese: Eparchy of Bačka

The Church of St. Nicholas (Serbian: Црква светог Николе) in Sivac is a Serbian Orthodox church in Vojvodina, Serbia, dedicated to Saint Nicholas. The building was constructed between 1868 and 1873 on the site of older religious buildings and today is protected as part of the Immovable Cultural Heritage of Great Importance. The iconostasis, which originates from an older church, is attributed to Pavel Đurković and dates back to the 1820s.

== See also ==
- Eparchy of Bačka
