= World Series of Fighting 27: Firmino vs. Fodor =

World Series of Fighting MMA event in 2016

World Series of Fighting 27: Future Champs
- Promotion: World Series of Fighting
- Date: January 23, 2016
- Venue: FedExForum
- City: Memphis, Tennessee, United States

Event chronology
World Series of Fighting 26: Palmer vs. Almeida	World Series of Fighting 27: Future Champs	World Series of Fighting Global Championship 2: Japan

World Series of Fighting 27: Future Champs was a mixed martial arts event held January 23, 2016 in Memphis, Tennessee, United States. This event aired on NBCSN in the U.S. and on Fight Network in Canada.

== Background ==
Number 2 ranked Light Heavyweight Teddy Holder faced off in the co-main event against WSOF newcomer Shamil Gamzatov.

Mike Ricci who was originally scheduled to face ONE Championship veteran Caros Fodor in the main event, but was replaced by Luiz Firmino due to an injury.

== Results ==
Fight Card
Weight class				Method	Round	Time	Notes
Lightweight	Luiz Firmino	def.	Caros Fodor	Decision (unanimous) (29–28, 29–28, 29–28)	3	5:00
Light Heavyweight	Shamil Gamzatov	def.	Teddy Holder	TKO (punches)	1	2:32
Featherweight	Bryce Mitchell	def.	Jorge Medina	Submission (rear-naked choke)	1	1:02
Welterweight	Jaleel Willis	def.	Chauncey Foxworth	Decision (unanimous) (30–27, 30–27, 30–27)	3	5:00
Preliminary Card (WSOF.com)
Welterweight	Wade Johnson	def.	Justin Hartley	Decision (split) (29–28, 28–29, 29–28)	3	5:00
Lightweight	Jason Williams	def.	Zach Underwood	TKO (knee injury)	1	1:28
Lightweight	Alvin Williams	def.	Wesley Sharp	KO (head kick)	1	0:30

== See also ==
- List of WSOF champions
- List of WSOF events
