= World Series of Fighting 3: Fitch vs. Burkman =

World Series of Fighting MMA event in 2013

- Promotion: World Series of Fighting
- Date: June 14, 2013
- Venue: Hard Rock Hotel and Casino
- City: Paradise, Nevada, United States
- Attendance: 700

Event chronology
World Series of Fighting 2: Arlovski vs. Johnson	World Series of Fighting 3: Fitch vs. Burkman	World Series of Fighting 1: Central America

World Series of Fighting 3: Fitch vs. Burkman was a mixed martial arts event held on June 14, 2013 in Las Vegas.

== Background ==
Tyrone Spong was scheduled to make his second appearance for promotion at this event in a match against Angel DeAnda. However, on May 1, it was announced that he had been pulled from the card due to visa issues.

A match between Rolles Gracie and Dave Huckaba was supposed to be on the main card, but Gracie was forced out due to injury and the fight was cancelled.

Jeff Smith also replaced an injured Chris Gruetzemacher on the preliminary card.

== Results ==
Main Card (NBC Sports)
Weight class				Method	Round	Time	Notes
Welterweight	Josh Burkman	def.	Jon Fitch	Technical Submission (guillotine choke)	1	0:41
Welterweight	Steve Carl	def.	Tyson Steele	Submission (rear-naked choke)	1	1:32
Lightweight	Jacob Volkmann	def.	Lyle Beerbohm	Decision (unanimous) (30–27, 30–27, 29–28)	3	5:00
Lightweight	Justin Gaethje	def.	Brian Cobb	TKO (leg kicks)	3	2:19
Preliminary Card (online)
Featherweight	Jerrod Sanders	def.	Jeff Smith	Decision (unanimous) (30–27, 30–27, 30–27)	3	5:00
Lightweight	Dan Lauzon	def.	John Gunderson	Decision (unanimous) (30–27, 30–27, 30–27)	3	5:00
Bantamweight	Carson Beebe	def.	Joe Murphy	Decision (unanimous) (29–28, 29–28, 29–28)	3	5:00
Middleweight	Krasimir Mladenov	def.	Kendrick Miree	Decision (unanimous) (29–28, 30–27, 30–27)	3	5:00
Featherweight	Brenson Hansen	def.	Josh Montalvo	Decision (unanimous) (30–27, 30–27, 29–28)	3	5:00

== See also ==
- List of WSOF champions
- List of WSOF events
