= World Series of Fighting 35: Ivanov vs. Jordan =

World Series of Fighting MMA event in 2016

- Promotion: World Series of Fighting
- Date: March 18, 2017
- Venue: Turning Stone Casino
- City: Verona, New York, United States

Event chronology
World Series of Fighting 34: Gaethje vs. Firmino	World Series of Fighting 35: Ivanov vs. Jordan	Professional Fighters League: Daytona

World Series of Fighting 35: Ivanov vs. Jordan was mixed martial arts event promoted by the World Series of Fighting that was held on March 18, 2017 at Turning Stone Casino in Verona, New York. It was the last for the WSOF before it was rebranded as the Professional Fighters League.

== Background ==
The event was headlined by three different title fights to determine the champions of the Heavyweight, Featherweight, and Bantamweight divisions.

== Results ==
Main Card
Weight class				Method	Round	Time	Notes
Heavyweight	Blagoy Ivanov (c)	def.	Shawn Jordan	TKO (punches)	1	1:43	(Note: For the WSOF Heavyweight Championship.)
Featherweight	Andre Harrison	def.	Lance Palmer (c)	Decision (unanimous) (48-47, 48-47, 49-46)	5	5:00	(Note: For the WSOF Featherweight Championship.)
Bantamweight	Bekbulat Magomedov (c)	def.	Donavon Frelow	Decision (unanimous) (50-45, 50-45, 50-45)	5	5:00	(Note: For the WSOF Bantamweight Championship.)
Welterweight	Abubakar Nurmagomedov	def.	Matt Secor	Decision (unanimous) (30-27, 29-28, 30-27)	3	5:00
Lightweight	Tom Marcellino	def.	Bill Jones	Decision (unanimous) (30-27, 30-27, 29-28)	3	5:00
Featherweight	Hakeem Dawodu	def.	Steven Siler	Decision (unanimous) (30-27, 29-28, 30-26)	3	5:00
Lightweight	Islam Mamedov	def.	Natan Schulte	Submission (armbar)	2	4:56
Catchweight (149)	Steven Rodriguez	def.	Alexandre Almeida	Decision (split) (30-27, 28-29, 29-28)	3	5:00
Catchweight (175)	Emmanuel Walo	def.	Andrews Nakahara	Decision (split) (29-28, 29-28, 28-29)	3	5:00

== See also ==
- List of WSOF events
- List of WSOF champions
