= World Series of Fighting 33: Branch vs. Magalhães =

- Promotion: World Series of Fighting
- Date: October 7, 2016
- Venue: Municipal Auditorium
- City: Kansas City, Missouri, United States

Event chronology
World Series of Fighting 32: Moraes vs. Hill 2	World Series of Fighting 33: Branch vs. Magalhães	World Series of Fighting 34: Gaethje vs. Firmino

World Series of Fighting 33: Branch vs. Magalhães was a mixed martial arts event held on October 7, 2016 at the Municipal Auditorium in Kansas City, Missouri, United States.

== Background ==
The event was expected to be headlined by a Lightweight Championship bout between undefeated champion Justin Gaethje and Ozzy Dugulubgov. However the fight was cancelled on the day of the event as Dugulubgov was stricken with an illness.

David Branch will defend his WSOF Light Heavyweight Championship against Vinny Magalhães in the main event.

The fight between Jason High and João Zeferino was changed from a lightweight bout to a catchweight bout after High missed weight.

== Results ==
Main Card (NBCSN)
Weight class				Method	Round	Time	Notes
Light Heavyweight	David Branch (c)	def.	Vinny Magalhães	Decision (unanimous) (50–44, 50–44, 50–44)	5	5:00	(Note: For the WSOF Light Heavyweight Championship.)
Catchweight (160 lb)	João Zeferino	def.	Jason High	TKO (punches)	3	0:51
Lightweight	Brian Foster	def.	Luiz Firmino	Submission (triangle choke)	1	3:14
Welterweight	Abubakar Nurmagomedov	def.	John Howard	Decision (unanimous) (29–28, 29–28, 30–27)	3	5:00
Heavyweight	Shawn Jordan	def.	Ashley Gooch	TKO (punches)	1	4:40
Bantamweight	Timur Valiev	def.	Chris Gutiérrez	Decision (unanimous) (29–28, 30–27, 30–27)	3	5:00
Preliminary card (WSOF.com)
Bantamweight	Bekbulat Magomedov	def.	Jesse Brock	Decision (unanimous) (29–28, 29–28, 30–27)	3	5:00
Welterweight	Abu Azaitar	def.	Mike Arrant	Decision (unanimous) (30–27, 30–27, 30–27)	3	5:00
Welterweight	Magomed Magomedkerimov	def.	Bobby Cooper	Decision (split) (30–27, 28–29, 30–27)	3	5:00
Featherweight	Bryce Mitchell	def.	Brandon Phillips	Submission (triangle choke)	2	3:14

== See also ==
- List of WSOF events
- List of WSOF champions
