= World Series of Fighting 10: Branch vs. Taylor =

World Series of Fighting MMA event in 2014

- Promotion: World Series of Fighting
- Date: June 21, 2014
- Venue: Hard Rock Hotel & Casino
- City: Las Vegas, Nevada, United States
- Attendance: 600

Event chronology
World Series of Fighting Canada 2: Loiseau vs Lewis	World Series of Fighting 10: Branch vs. Taylor	World Series of Fighting 11: Gaethje vs. Newell

World Series of Fighting 10: Branch vs. Taylor was a mixed martial arts event that took place on June 21, 2014, at the Hard Rock Hotel & Casino in Las Vegas, Nevada, United States.

== Background ==
The event was originally planned to take place at the Event Center Arena on the campus of San Jose State University. However, the organization announced the change in location and venue on April 18, 2014.

This event featured the finals of the WSOF Middleweight Championship tournament between David Branch and Jesse Taylor.

Georgi Karakhanyan made his first title defense at this event as he took on Rick Glenn.

Lynn Alvarez and Sofia Bagherdai were expected to fight at the event but the bout was cancelled after an injury to Bagherdai.

== Results ==
Main Card (NBC Sports)
Weight class				Method	Round	Time	Notes
Middleweight	David Branch	def.	Jesse Taylor	Submission (brabo choke)	1	1:41	(Note: For the inaugural WSOF Middleweight Championship.)
Featherweight	Ricky Glenn	def.	Georgi Karakhanyan (c)	TKO (retirement)	2	5:00	(Note: For the WSOF Featherweight Championship.)
Women's Strawweight	Jessica Aguilar (c)	def.	Emi Fujino	Decision (unanimous) (50–44, 50–44, 50–44)	5	5:00	(Note: For the WSOF Women's Strawweight Championship.)
Lightweight	Luiz Firmino	def.	Tyson Griffin	Decision (unanimous) (29–28, 29–28, 30–27)	3	5:00
Featherweight	Lance Palmer	def.	Nick LoBosco	Submission (rear-naked choke)	1	4:15
Preliminary card
Heavyweight	Derrick Mehmen	def.	Dave Huckaba	Decision (unanimous) (30–26, 30–25, 30–27)	3	5:00
Bantamweight	Timur Valiev	def.	Adam Acquaviva	TKO (flying knee)	3	1:35
Middleweight	Krasimir Mladenov	def.	Angel DeAnda	Decision (unanimous) (30–27, 30–27, 30–27)	3	5:00
Women's Bantamweight	Ashlee Evans-Smith	def.	Marciea Allen	TKO (elbows)	3	3:01
Lightweight	Jimmy Spicuzza	def.	Justin Jaynes	Decision (unanimous) (30–27, 30–27, 30–27)	3	5:00
Lightweight	A.J. Williams	def.	Tanner Cowan	KO (head kick and punches)	1	0:44

=== Tournament bracket ===
Semifinals
David Branch	DEC
Danillo Villefort	15:00
Elvis Mutapčić	15:00
Jesse Taylor	DEC

Finals
David Branch	SUB
Jesse Taylor	1

== See also ==
- World Series of Fighting
- List of WSOF champions
- List of WSOF events
