= Jon Fitch =

American mixed martial arts fighter (born 1978)

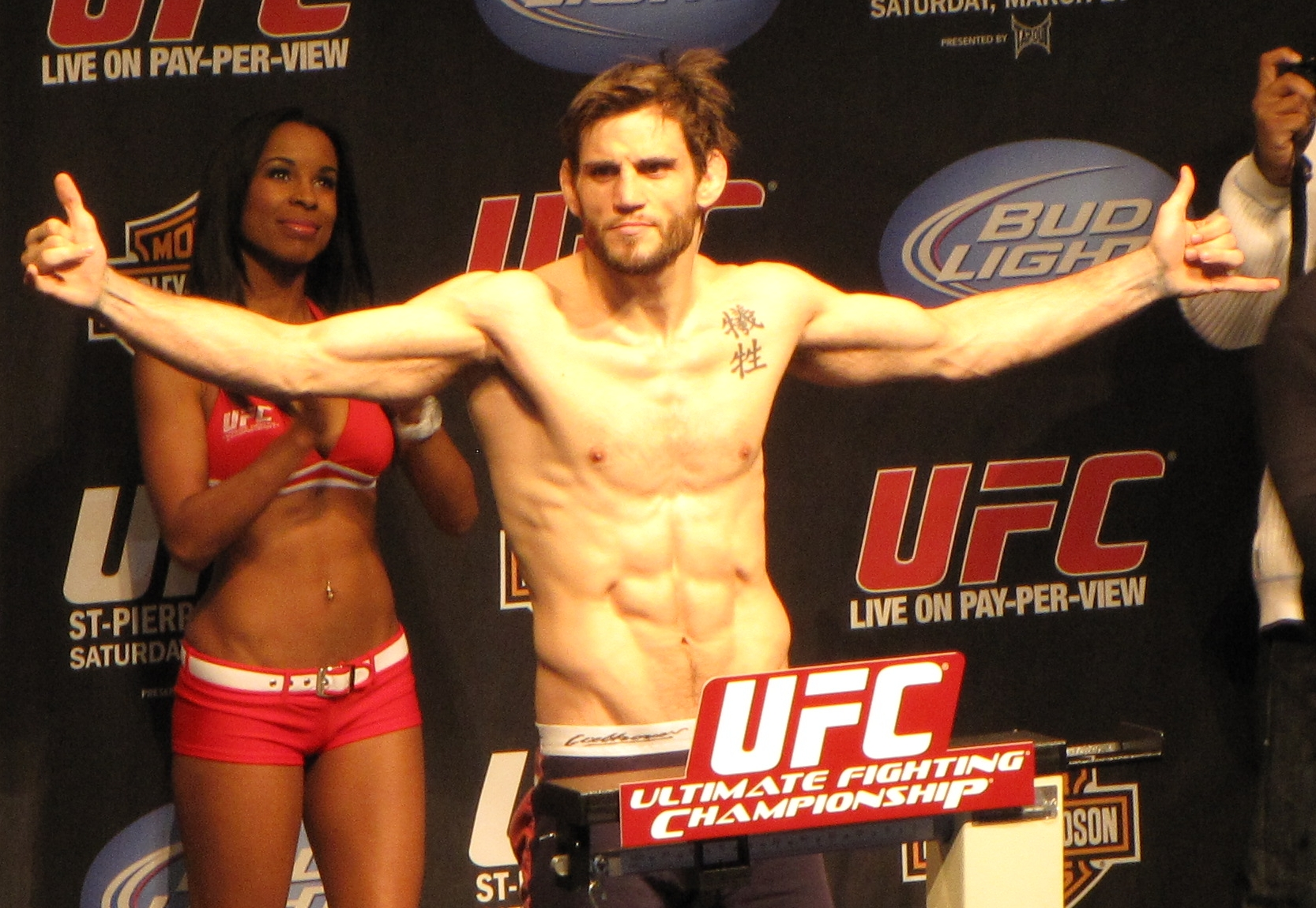
- Fitch in 2010
- Born: February 24, 1978 (age 48); Fort Wayne, Indiana, U.S.
- Height: 6 ft 0 in (1.83 m)
- Weight: 170 lb (77 kg; 12 st 2 lb)
- Division: Welterweight (2002–2020); Middleweight (2003, 2014)
- Reach: 74 in (188 cm)
- Style: Wrestling
- Stance: Orthodox
- Fighting out of: San Jose, California, U.S.
- Team: American Kickboxing Academy
- Rank: Black belt in Guerrilla Jiu Jitsu
- Wrestling: NCAA Division I Wrestling
- Years active: 2002–2020

Mixed martial arts record
- Total: 43
- Wins: 32
- By knockout: 7
- By submission: 5
- By decision: 20
- Losses: 8
- By knockout: 2
- By submission: 4
- By decision: 2
- Draws: 2
- No contests: 1

Amateur record
- Total: 2
- Wins: 2
- By submission: 2

Other information
- University: Purdue University
- Spouse: Michele Cao (m. 2010; div. 2018)
- Notable school: Carroll High School
- Website: http://www.jonfitch.net/
- Mixed martial arts record from Sherdog

Jon Fitch (born February 24, 1978) is an American retired mixed martial artist. He has competed in the Welterweight divisions of the Ultimate Fighting Championship (UFC), the Professional Fighters League (PFL), and most recently for Bellator MMA. In the UFC, Fitch compiled a record of 14–3–1 and once challenged for the UFC Welterweight Championship. In the PFL, Fitch achieved championship success when he won the WSOF Welterweight Championship, and he also once challenged for the Bellator MMA Welterweight World Championship.

== Background ==
After graduating from Carroll High School, Fitch enrolled at Purdue University in 1997 and graduated in 2002 with a bachelor's in physical education and a minor in history.

As a walk-on to the Purdue wrestling team, Fitch, a four-year letterman, wrestled under the tutelage of Tom Erikson and eventually became the team captain of the wrestling squad. Fitch secured a starting spot early on in his career, but struggled to find initial success. Compiling an 8–23 record his sophomore season, Fitch impressively turned that around to compile an 18–12 record in his final year. He finished with a 45–51 record overall for his collegiate wrestling career.

Tom Erikson, a former PRIDE fighter, would occasionally bring other mixed martial artists to the wrestling gym, and Fitch would be introduced to such fighters as Mark Coleman and Gary Goodridge. The sport, and the money that the high-level fighters were making interested Fitch, and he started his mixed martial arts career in 2002.

== Mixed martial arts career ==
Jon Fitch began his career at light heavyweight with a record of four wins, two losses and one No Contest. Understanding that the sport required cross training in various martial arts, Fitch soon left for San Jose, California to train with the American Kickboxing Academy.

In his next seven fights, Fitch fought at Middleweight and amassed wins over fighters such as Shonie Carter, Alex Serdyukov and Jeff Joslin. After failing to make the selection process for the first season of The Ultimate Fighter – a last-minute decision by the production team that left Fitch stranded in an airport with his luggage already boarded – he earned a shot in the Ultimate Fighting Championship on October 3, 2005, where Fitch defeated Brock Larson by unanimous decision in a middleweight fight.

=== Ultimate Fighting Championship ===
==== Drop to welterweight ====
Soon after, Fitch dropped down to the welterweight division and won his next seven fights. With victories over Josh Burkman, Thiago Alves, Luigi Fioravanti, Diego Sanchez, and Chris Wilson (tying the record set by Royce Gracie for most consecutive wins in the UFC), Fitch was seen as a top welterweight contender. UFC President Dana White praised Fitch's performances inside the Octagon, and indicated that Fitch would fight the winner of the Georges St-Pierre vs. Matt Serra Welterweight title fight.

==== Championship fight ====
Fitch was defeated by Georges St-Pierre via unanimous decision (50–43, 50–44, and 50–44) at UFC 87. After the fight GSP spoke to Fitch about the growth that his own loss prompted and said that Fitch's experience should be no different.

==== Back to title contention ====
Fitch was released from the UFC on November 20, 2008. The dispute was over his reluctance to sign a lifetime contract to allow his name and likeness to be used in THQ's UFC 2009 Undisputed video game. In the end, Fitch ended up signing a licensing agreement that allowed the UFC to feature him in the video game, ensuring his return to the UFC. Fitch's exile from the UFC lasted less than 24 hours.

Fitch returned to action on January 31, 2009, at UFC 94, facing Pride FC veteran Akihiro Gono. Fitch was victorious via unanimous decision.

On July 11, 2009, Fitch defeated previously unbeaten Brazilian Paulo Thiago via unanimous decision at UFC 100.

Fitch was expected to fight Ricardo Almeida on November 21, 2009, at UFC 106 but, due to a knee injury sustained by Almeida, the fight was cancelled.

Fitch was then scheduled to face Thiago Alves in a highly anticipated rematch on December 12, 2009, at UFC 107. However, Alves suffered an injury and was replaced by Mike Pierce. Fitch won via unanimous decision.

Fitch was expected to finally face Thiago Alves on March 27, 2010, at UFC 111, but on March 25, 2010, Alves was forced off the card due to a brain irregularity that appeared on a pre fight CAT scan. However, Ben Saunders, who was previously scheduled to fight on the same card against Jake Ellenberger, requested that he fight Fitch instead and that fight took place on the main card. Fitch won the fight via unanimous decision.

The Alves/Fitch rematch finally took place at UFC 117 on August 7, 2010. This fight was confirmed to be the number one contendership for the welterweight championship (to fight the winner of the St-Pierre/Koscheck bout). Alves again failed to make weight, weighing in at 171.5 lbs. As a result, Alves was fined 20% of his fight purse, which went to Fitch. Fitch went on to defeat Alves via unanimous decision. Dana White later made remarks that the manner of Fitch's victories (primarily judges' decisions rather than finishes) and lack of connection with the UFC fans has put Fitch's number one contender status in doubt. Following Jake Shields' victory over Martin Kampmann at UFC 121, White confirmed Shields as the next in line for the welterweight title shot, leaving Fitch's status in the division unconfirmed. Fitch found this peculiar, considering that Shields' victory was mostly the same as Fitch's previous performances.

Fitch was expected to face Jake Ellenberger on February 5, 2011, at UFC 126. But after B.J. Penn defeated Matt Hughes at UFC 123, UFC president Dana White decided to match Fitch up against Penn at UFC 127 in Australia instead. At the end of the fight the scorecards of the judges were (29–28 Fitch, 28–28, and 28–28), resulting in the fight being declared a majority draw. When asked by Joe Rogan if Fitch would like a rematch, Fitch replied that he wants another title shot more than anything.

A rematch with Penn was expected to take place on July 2, 2011, at UFC 132., but in late March, Fitch pulled out of the bout with an injury.

After months of dealing with a shoulder injury, Jon Fitch is back in business. “I’m back! Dr. Kavitne gave me the ok to fight,” he tweeted. Fitch has made no small secret of his desire to fight on the UFC 139 fight card that takes place in his city of residence, San Jose, California.

Fitch fought Johny Hendricks on December 30, 2011, at UFC 141. He was knocked out 12 seconds into the fight.

Fitch was expected to face Aaron Simpson on July 11, 2012, at UFC on Fuel TV: Munoz vs. Weidman. However, Fitch pulled out of the bout citing a knee injury and was replaced by returning veteran Kenny Robertson.

Fitch defeated rising prospect Erick Silva via unanimous decision on October 13, 2012, at UFC 153, with the back-and-forth bout receiving Fight of the Night honors. In a prefight interview, Fitch mentioned that he was experiencing tremendous financial difficulties and that losing the fight would force him to end his full-time training so that he could get a day job to help support his family. After winning the fight, he said the victory had saved his MMA career.

Fitch next faced Demian Maia on February 2, 2013, at UFC 156. Fitch lost by unanimous decision and was subsequently released from the promotion, despite being a top 10 ranked welterweight and having a 14–3–1 record with the promotion overall. Fitch's release from the promotion caused much debate about the UFC "code of conduct" and the general "skill-demand" in UFC, as most commentators had not expected a single loss to lead to a release from the promotion. Dana White defended this by saying he is a top 10 fighter who was on his way out, being ranked lower and lower after every fight.

=== World Series of Fighting ===
On March 7, 2013, it was announced that Fitch signed a four-fight contract with World Series of Fighting. He made his promotional debut on June 14, 2013, at WSOF 3, in a rematch against Josh Burkman. Fitch was knocked down by a punch and then finished by Burkman due to a guillotine choke submission. Burkman became the second man to defeat Fitch by a submission, the first being Mike Pyle.

Fitch faced Marcelo Alfaya at WSOF 6 on October 26, 2013, winning via split decision. Despite spending most of the first round trapped in a body triangle defending against submission attempts, Fitch showed improved striking in a back-and-forth fight, dropping Alfaya and following up with heavy ground-and-pound in the third.

In his third fight for the promotion, Fitch faced Dennis Hallman on July 5, 2014, at World Series of Fighting 11. He won the fight via unanimous decision.

In July, Fitch was scheduled to fight Rousimar Palhares at WSOF 11 for the WSOF Welterweight Championship. However, on April 30, 2014, Palhares pulled out of the fight for personal reasons. The title fight was rescheduled for WSOF 16 on December 13, 2014. He lost the fight by kneebar in the first round. After the fight, it was revealed that Fitch had failed the California State Athletic Commission's pre-fight drug testing. The positive test results of Fitch, who had previously been vocal in his criticism of PED users in MMA, were almost certainly due to synthetic testosterone.

Following his nine-month suspension, Fitch returned to the promotion on October 17, 2015, at WSOF 24. He faced Yushin Okami in the main event for the chance to fight for the vacant Welterweight title. Fitch won the bout by unanimous decision.

Fitch was lined up to face Jake Shields for the vacant WSOF welterweight championship at WSOF 30 on April 1, 2016. Though they have never competed together in an MMA contest, Shields holds a victory over Fitch in a submission grappling match. However, the match was later cancelled due to contract issues between Shields and the company. Fitch went on to face João Zeferino for the vacant WSOF Welterweight Championship. He won via unanimous decision.

On September 13, 2016, it was announced that Fitch would defend the WSOF Welterweight Championship against Jake Shields on November 12, 2016, at WSOF 34. On October 17, 2016, it was announced that the fight was then rescheduled to take place on December 31, 2016, in the co-main event. Fitch won the fight via unanimous decision.

In his second title defense for the now renamed league, Fitch faced Brian Foster on June 30, 2017, at Professional Fighters League 1, He won the fight in the second round due to submission, his first finish in ten years.

=== Bellator MMA ===
Fitch was signed by Bellator MMA, vacating WSOF Welterweight title, on March 1, 2018.

Fitch made his promotional debut against Paul Daley at Bellator 199 on May 12, 2018. He won the fight by unanimous decision.

Fitch next challenged Rory MacDonald in a welterweight title fight that was simultaneously the first round of Bellator Welterweight World Grand Prix at Bellator 220 on April 27, 2019. The back-and-forth bout ended in a majority draw. Due to the fight ending in a draw, MacDonald retained the title and advanced to the semifinals.

Fitch faced Neiman Gracie at Bellator 246 on September 12, 2020. He lost the bout via second round submission and subsequently announced his retirement following the bout.

== Personal life ==
Jon and his longtime girlfriend Michele got engaged the day after UFC 100. The couple were married on September 4, 2010, and had 2 children together, but later divorced in late 2018.

On December 16, 2014, Fitch was listed as one of three MMA fighters who filed a class-action lawsuit against Zuffa, LLC., the parent company of the UFC. The suit alleges that the UFC participated in anti-competitive practices that hindered fighters and their mixed martial arts careers.

== Film and television ==
Jon Fitch appeared on the November 5, 2008, episode of MythBusters, "Coffin Punch". The MythBusters were attempting to determine if someone could punch their way out of a coffin. For his part, Jon Fitch laid on his back and punched up into a sensor, attached to a punching bag that was a few inches above Fitch, allowing his arm only three inches of travel before contact with the sensor. The sensor read that the power behind Fitch's punch was just under 1,500 pounds of force (6672 N).

Fitch also made a brief cameo in the award-winning mixed martial arts documentary Fight Life sparring with Jake Shields. The film was directed by James Z. Feng and released in 2013. Fitch is the main subject of the movie Such Great Heights which documents his preparations to fight Georges St. Pierre at UFC 87. The film was directed by Jonah Tulis and released in 2012.

== Championships and accomplishments ==
- Ultimate Fighting Championship
  - Fight of the Night (Two times)
  - UFC.com Awards
    - 2008: Ranked #6 Fight of the Year vs. Georges St-Pierre
- World Series of Fighting/Professional Fighters League
  - WSOF Welterweight Championship (One time)
  - Two successful title defenses
  - Oldest Champion in WSOF/PFL history (38 years 40 days)
  - Most decision wins in WSOF/PFL history (5)
- MMA Junkie
  - 2008 Fight of the Year vs. Georges St-Pierre at UFC 87

== Mixed martial arts record ==
Professional record breakdown
43 matches	32 wins	8 losses
By knockout	7	2
By submission	5	4
By decision	20	2
Draws	2	
No contests	1	

Res.	Record	Opponent	Method	Event	Date	Round	Time	Location	Notes
Loss	32–8–2 (1)	Neiman Gracie	Submission (heel hook)	Bellator 246	September 12, 2020	2	4:47	Uncasville, Connecticut, United States	Retired after bout.
Draw	32–7–2 (1)	Rory MacDonald	Draw (majority)	Bellator 220	April 27, 2019	5	5:00	San Jose, California, United States	Bellator Welterweight World Grand Prix Quarterfinal. For the Bellator Welterweight World Championship.
Win	32–7–1 (1)	Paul Daley	Decision (unanimous)	Bellator 199	May 12, 2018	3	5:00	San Jose, California, United States	
Win	31–7–1 (1)	Brian Foster	Submission (bulldog choke)	PFL: Daytona	June 30, 2017	2	3:12	Daytona Beach, Florida, United States	Defended the PFL Welterweight Championship. Later vacated title.
Win	30–7–1 (1)	Jake Shields	Decision (unanimous)	WSOF 34	December 31, 2016	5	5:00	New York City, New York, United States	Defended the WSOF Welterweight Championship.
Win	29–7–1 (1)	João Zeferino	Decision (unanimous)	WSOF 30	April 2, 2016	5	5:00	Las Vegas, Nevada, United States	Won the vacant WSOF Welterweight Championship.
Win	28–7–1 (1)	Yushin Okami	Decision (unanimous)	WSOF 24	October 17, 2015	3	5:00	Mashantucket, Connecticut, United States	WSOF Welterweight title eliminator.
Loss	27–7–1 (1)	Rousimar Palhares	Submission (kneebar)	WSOF 16	December 13, 2014	1	1:30	Sacramento, California, United States	For the WSOF Welterweight Championship.
Win	27–6–1 (1)	Dennis Hallman	Decision (unanimous)	WSOF 11	July 5, 2014	3	5:00	Daytona Beach, Florida, United States	Middleweight bout.
Win	26–6–1 (1)	Marcelo Alfaya	Decision (split)	WSOF 6	October 26, 2013	3	5:00	Coral Gables, Florida, United States	
Loss	25–6–1 (1)	Josh Burkman	Technical Submission (guillotine choke)	WSOF 3	June 14, 2013	1	0:41	Las Vegas, Nevada, United States	
Loss	25–5–1 (1)	Demian Maia	Decision (unanimous)	UFC 156	February 2, 2013	3	5:00	Las Vegas, Nevada, United States	
Win	25–4–1 (1)	Erick Silva	Decision (unanimous)	UFC 153	October 13, 2012	3	5:00	Rio de Janeiro, Rio de Janeiro, Brazil	Fight of the Night.
Loss	24–4–1 (1)	Johny Hendricks	KO (punch)	UFC 141	December 30, 2011	1	0:12	Las Vegas, Nevada, United States	
Draw	24–3–1 (1)	B.J. Penn	Draw (majority)	UFC 127	February 27, 2011	3	5:00	Sydney, New South Wales, Australia	
Win	24–3 (1)	Thiago Alves	Decision (unanimous)	UFC 117	August 7, 2010	3	5:00	Oakland, California, United States	Catchweight (171.5 lb) bout. Alves missed weight.
Win	23–3 (1)	Ben Saunders	Decision (unanimous)	UFC 111	March 27, 2010	3	5:00	Newark, New Jersey, United States	
Win	22–3 (1)	Mike Pierce	Decision (unanimous)	UFC 107	December 12, 2009	3	5:00	Memphis, Tennessee, United States	
Win	21–3 (1)	Paulo Thiago	Decision (unanimous)	UFC 100	July 11, 2009	3	5:00	Las Vegas, Nevada, United States	
Win	20–3 (1)	Akihiro Gono	Decision (unanimous)	UFC 94	January 31, 2009	3	5:00	Las Vegas, Nevada, United States	
Loss	19–3 (1)	Georges St-Pierre	Decision (unanimous)	UFC 87	August 9, 2008	5	5:00	Minneapolis, Minnesota, United States	For the UFC Welterweight Championship. Fight of the Night.
Win	19–2 (1)	Chris Wilson	Decision (unanimous)	UFC 82	March 1, 2008	3	5:00	Columbus, Ohio, United States	
Win	18–2 (1)	Diego Sanchez	Decision (split)	UFC 76	September 22, 2007	3	5:00	Anaheim, California, United States	
Win	17–2 (1)	Roan Carneiro	Submission (rear-naked choke)	UFC Fight Night 10	June 12, 2007	2	1:07	Hollywood, Florida, United States	
Win	16–2 (1)	Luigi Fioravanti	Submission (rear-naked choke)	UFC 68	March 3, 2007	2	3:05	Columbus, Ohio, United States	
Win	15–2 (1)	Kuniyoshi Hironaka	Decision (unanimous)	UFC 64	October 14, 2006	3	5:00	Las Vegas, Nevada, United States	
Win	14–2 (1)	Thiago Alves	TKO (upkick and punches)	UFC Fight Night 5	June 28, 2006	2	4:37	Las Vegas, Nevada, United States	
Win	13–2 (1)	Josh Burkman	Submission (rear-naked choke)	UFC Fight Night 4	April 6, 2006	2	4:57	Las Vegas, Nevada, United States	
Win	12–2 (1)	Brock Larson	Decision (unanimous)	UFC Fight Night 2	October 3, 2005	3	5:00	Las Vegas, Nevada, United States	
Win	11–2 (1)	Jeff Joslin	Decision (split)	Freedom Fight	July 9, 2005	3	5:00	Hull, Quebec, Canada	
Win	10–2 (1)	Alex Serdyukov	TKO (punches)	MMA Mexico 1	December 17, 2004	2	2:15	Ciudad Juárez, Chihuahua, Mexico	
Win	9–2 (1)	Jorge Ortiz	Decision (unanimous)	MMA Mexico 1	December 17, 2004	3	5:00	Ciudad Juárez, Chihuahua, Mexico	
Win	8–2 (1)	Mike Seal	TKO (punches)	MMA Mexico 1	December 17, 2004	2	2:35	Ciudad Juárez, Chihuahua, Mexico	
Win	7–2 (1)	Kengo Ura	Decision (unanimous)	Venom 1	September 18, 2004	2	5:00	Las Vegas, Nevada, United States	
Win	6–2 (1)	Shonie Carter	Submission (slam)	Shooto USA	November 14, 2003	3	0:41	Las Vegas, Nevada, United States	175 lbs bout.
Win	5–2 (1)	Gabe Garcia	TKO (punches)	X–1	September 6, 2003	1	2:41	Yokohama, Japan	
Win	4–2 (1)	Kyle Jensen	Decision (unanimous)	Battleground 1	July 19, 2003	3	5:00	Chicago, Illinois, United States	
NC	3–2 (1)	Solomon Hutcherson	NC (cut due to illegal kick)	HOOKnSHOOT 1.1	March 8, 2003	2	N/A	Evansville, Indiana, United States	Hutcherson kicked Fitch on the ground opening up a cut.
Loss	3–2	Wilson Gouveia	KO (knee)	HOOKnSHOOT 1	December 13, 2002	1	3:38	Fort Lauderdale, Florida, United States	
Win	3–1	Eric Tix	KO (punch)	UW	September 7, 2002	1	0:07	Fridley, Minnesota, United States	
Win	2–1	Dan Hart	Submission (guillotine choke)	UW	September 7, 2002	1	1:14	Fridley, Minnesota, United States	
Win	1–1	Felix Alvarez	KO (punch)	MMA - Cuando Hierve la Sangre	August 31, 2002	1	0:10	Monterrey, Nuevo León, Mexico	
Loss	0–1	Mike Pyle	Submission (rear-naked choke)	Revolution Fighting Championship 1	July 13, 2002	1	2:35	Las Vegas, Nevada, United States	

== Pay-per-view bouts ==
No.	Event	PPV Buys
1.	UFC 87	625,000
2.	UFC 127	260,000
