= World Series of Fighting 30: Branch vs. Starks =

World Series of Fighting MMA event in 2016

- Promotion: World Series of Fighting
- Date: April 2, 2016
- Venue: Hard Rock Hotel and Casino
- City: Las Vegas, Nevada

Event chronology
| World Series of Fighting 29: Gaethje vs. Foster | World Series of Fighting 30: Branch vs. Starks | World Series of Fighting 31: Ivanov vs. Copeland |

World Series of Fighting 30: Branch vs. Starks was a mixed martial arts event held on April 2, 2016 at the Hard Rock Hotel and Casino in Las Vegas, Nevada, United States.

== Background ==
The event was headlined by a WSOF Middleweight Championship fight between champion David Branch and Clifford Starks. The co-headliner was a fight between Jon Fitch and João Zeferino for the vacant WSOF Welterweight Championship. After Rousimar Palhares was stripped of the title for holding the submission too long in the fight against Jake Shields, Fitch and Shields were originally expected to fight for the vacant title, but Shields pulled out of the fight, citing a disagreement over his contract.

== Results ==
Main Card (NBCSN)
| Weight class | | | | Method | Round | Time | Notes |
|---|---|---|---|---|---|---|---|
| Middleweight | David Branch (c) | def. | Clifford Starks | Decision (unanimous) (49–44, 49–44, 49–44) | 5 | 5:00 | (Note: For the WSOF Middleweight Championship.) |
| Welterweight | Jon Fitch | def. | João Zeferino | Decision (unanimous) (50–45, 50–45, 50–45) | 5 | 5:00 | (Note: For the vacant WSOF Welterweight Championship.) |
| Light Heavyweight | Vinny Magalhães | def. | Jake Heun | Decision (unanimous) (29–28, 29–28, 29–28) | 3 | 5:00 |
| Welterweight | Abu Azaitar | def. | Danny Davis Jr. | Decision (unanimous) (29–28, 29–28, 29–28) | 3 | 5:00 |
Preliminary Card (WSOF.com)
| Welterweight | Abubakar Nurmagomedov | def. | Matthew Frincu | TKO (punches) | 2 | 3:05 |
| Middleweight | Rex Harris | def. | Clinton Williams | Decision (unanimous) (30–27, 29–28, 29–28) | 3 | 5:00 |
| Catchweight (160 lb) | Steve Kozola | def. | Matt Church | TKO (punches) | 1 | 1:57 |
| Bantamweight | Adam Acquaviva | def. | Andres Ponce | Submission (rear-naked choke) | 1 | 2:10 |
| Welterweight | Zach Bunnell | def. | Jeff Roman | Decision (split) (30–27, 28-29, 29–28) | 3 | 5:00 |

== See also ==
- List of WSOF events
- List of WSOF champions
