= World Series of Fighting 11: Gaethje vs. Newell =

World Series of Fighting MMA event in 2014

- Promotion: World Series of Fighting
- Date: July 5, 2014
- Venue: Ocean Center
- City: Daytona Beach, Florida, United States
- Attendance: 6,275

Event chronology
World Series of Fighting 10: Branch vs. Taylor	World Series of Fighting 11: Gaethje vs. Newell	World Series of Fighting 12: Palomino vs Gonzalez

World Series of Fighting 11: Gaethje vs. Newell was a mixed martial arts event held on July 5, 2014, in the United States. This event aired live in prime time on NBC.

== Background ==
Rousimar Palhares was set to make his first title defense against former UFC veteran Jon Fitch on this show. On April 30, 2014, it was announced that the bout was canceled due to personal problems with Palhares.

Fitch was then expected to face debuting Jake Shields. However, Shields was forced out of the bout due to an injury. Fitch was then expected to face Josh Burkman in a rubber match. However, Burkman was forced out of the bout due to an elbow injury. Fitch eventually faced Dennis Hallman at the event

This event featured the first Lightweight title defense for Justin Gaethje as he faced undefeated lightweight Nick Newell.

Matt Hamill was expected to make his debut at this event but was sidelined due to a knee injury.

Brian Cobb was expected to face Luis Palomino at the event, however Cobb was removed from the bout for unknown reasons and was replaced by T.J. O'Brien. The bout between Palomino and O'Brien was later cancelled for unknown reasons.

Both Melvin Guillard and Cody Bollinger missed weight for their respective bouts. Guillard forfeited 15% of his purse to Gesias Cavalcante, while Bollinger forfeited over 20% to Pablo Alfonso.

== Results ==
Main Card
Weight class				Method	Round	Time	Notes
Lightweight	Justin Gaethje (c)	def.	Nick Newell	TKO (punches)	2	3:09	(Note: For the WSOF Lightweight Championship.)
Middleweight	Jon Fitch	def.	Dennis Hallman	Decision (unanimous) (30–27, 30–27, 30–27)	3	5:00
Catchweight (138.4 lb)	Cody Bollinger	def.	Pablo Alfonso	Submission (rear-naked choke)	1	2:37
Catchweight (159.4 lb)	Melvin Guillard	def.	Gesias Cavalcante	TKO (punches and elbows)	2	2:36
Preliminary card
Light Heavyweight	Jake Heun	def.	Kendrick Miree	Decision (unanimous) (29–28, 29–28, 29–28)	3	5:00
Catchweight (175 lb)	Neiman Gracie	def.	Dustin Holyko	Submission (rear-naked choke)	2	2:21
Catchweight (175 lb)	Jose Caceres	def.	Walber Brito de Barros	Decision (unanimous) (30–27, 29–28, 29–28)	3	5:00
Light Heavyweight	Muhammed DeReese	def.	Rashaun Spencer	Decision (unanimous) (30–27, 29–28, 29–28)	3	5:00

== See also ==
- World Series of Fighting
- List of WSOF champions
- List of WSOF events
