= Luiz Firmino =

Brazilian mixed martial arts fighter

- Born: Luiz Firmino de Carvalho Júnior; March 18, 1982 (age 44); Paraíba, Brazil
- Other names: Buscapé
- Height: 5 ft 8 in (1.73 m)
- Weight: 154 lb (70 kg; 11.0 st)
- Division: Lightweight
- Reach: 69.5 in (177 cm)
- Style: MMA, Brazilian jiu-jitsu, Shooto
- Fighting out of: Boca Raton, Florida
- Team: Combat Club
- Rank: Black belt in Brazilian Jiu-Jitsu
- Years active: 2000–present

Mixed martial arts record
- Total: 30
- Wins: 20
- By knockout: 2
- By submission: 7
- By decision: 11
- Losses: 10
- By knockout: 1
- By submission: 2
- By decision: 7

Other information
- Mixed martial arts record from Sherdog
- Last updated on: March 13, 2012

Luiz Firmino de Carvalho Júnior (born March 18, 1982), commonly known as Luiz Buscapé, is a Brazilian mixed martial artist, who fights at Lightweight. He has spent the majority of his career in Japan and has fought in Dream, Pride FC and Shooto. He now fights for the Blackzilians camp out of JACO HYbrid Training Center in Boca Raton, Florida.

== Biography ==
Firmino began his career at the tenth World Vale Tudo Championship in Recife, Brazil when he was 18 years old. The tournament was held in one night and was fought under Vale Tudo-style rules. After defeating Reginaldo Santana and Sergei Bytchkov, he reached the final and faced Eli Soares. The fight lasted for thirty minutes with no breaks and Soares won by decision.

Firmino then returned two years later at the M-1 Global event MFC: Russia vs the World 3 in Saint Petersburg, Russia where he again beat Sergei Bytchkov, by technical knockout in the second round. At Russia vs the World 5 the following year, he defeated Musail Allaudinov via unanimous decision after one fifteen-minute round. After winning his next four bouts - three by submission - he was given a chance to compete in the Pride Fighting Championships.

=== Pride Fighting Championships ===
Firmino faced off against Hiroyuki Abe at his first Pride fight, Pride Bushido 4 in July 2004, and won by using an arm triangle choke in the first round. Firmino then returned against Masakazu Imanari three months later at Pride Bushido 5 at won by unanimous decision. After this early success, he lost his next two bouts (against countryman Luiz Azeredo and Tatsuya Kawajiri) by decision in 2005. In November 2006, Firmino took on Nobuhiro Obiya at Pride Bushido 13 and won the fight by yet another unanimous decision.

=== Dream ===
Pride FC then shut down, however, and Firmino soon signed with Dream. He made his debut with the organization at its first event, Dream 1, in March 2008 where he submitted Kazuyuki Miyata with a rear-naked choke seven minutes into the first round. At Dream 3 two months later, he was given the opportunity to avenge his earlier loss to Tatsuya Kawajiri. He was unable to do this, however, and was beaten on a unanimous decision.

=== Post-Japan ===
Firmino then left Dream after this, and won his first fight outside Japan in five years when he beat Ryan Healy in Miami, Florida at Shine Fights 2: ATT vs. The World in September 2009.

Firmino also returned to fight in his native Brazil for the first time in almost seven years when he faced Francisco Trinaldo at Bitetti Combat MMA 6, where he was submitted with a kneebar.

Firmino competed at Superior Cage Combat 3, where he lost against UFC and Pride veteran, Canadian John Alessio via decision.

Firmino defeated The Ultimate Fighter: Live alumni Johnavan Vistante by submission due to an arm-triangle choke in the first round at CFA 07: Never Give Up in Coral Gables, Florida on June 30, 2012.

Firmino defeated two-time Bellator Tournament finalist, and 2009 Submission of the year winner Toby Imada by unanimous decision at CFA 08 in Hollywood, Florida on October 6, 2012.

Firmino faced Bellator veteran Luis Palomino on January 19, 2013 for the CFA Lightweight Championship, Firmino dominated Palomino with his Wrestling and ground and pound to take home the CFA Lightweight Championship by unanimous decision. Firmino vacated the title in September 2013 when he signed with World Series of Fighting.

=== World Series of Fighting ===
Firmino made his WSOF debut against Jacob Volkmann at WSOF 6 on October 26, 2013. He won the fight via unanimous decision. He then faced UFC veteran Tyson Griffin at WSOF 10 on June 21, 2014. He won the back-and-forth fight via unanimous decision.

After almost two years away from the promotion, Firmino returned in January 2016 to face Strikeforce and UFC veteran Caros Fodor at WSOF 27. He won the fight by unanimous decision.

Firmino faced Brian Foster at WSOF 33 on October 7 in Kansas City, Missouri. He lost the fight by submission in the first round.

Firmino stepped in for an injured João Zeferino to take on WSOF Lightweight Champion Justin Gaethje at WSOF 34. After a back-and-forth three rounds, the bout was stopped by the doctor between rounds three and four due to Firmino's swollen right eye; the end result was a TKO loss for Firmino.

=== The Ultimate Fighter ===
Firmino was as a cast member for The Ultimate Fighter: American Top Team vs. Blackzilians representing Blackzilians He defeated Uros Jurisic by unanimous decision to win 25 points for his team.

== Championships and accomplishments ==
- Championship Fighting Alliance
  - CFA Lightweight Championship (One time)

== Mixed martial arts record ==
Professional record breakdown
30 matches	20 wins	10 losses
By knockout	2	1
By submission	7	2
By decision	11	7

Res.	Record	Opponent	Method	Event	Date	Round	Time	Location	Notes
Loss	20–10	Rashid Magomedov	Decision (unanimous)	PFL 5	August 2, 2018	3	5:00	Uniondale, New York, United States	
Loss	20–9	Will Brooks	Decision (unanimous)	PFL 2	June 21, 2018	3	5:00	Chicago, Illinois, United States	
Win	20–8	Eddy Ellis	TKO (punches)	PFL: Everett	July 29, 2017	1	1:45	Everett, Washington, United States	
Loss	19–8	Justin Gaethje	TKO (doctor stoppage)	WSOF 34	December 31, 2016	3	5:00	New York City, New York, United States	For the WSOF Lightweight Championship.
Loss	19–7	Brian Foster	Submission (triangle choke)	WSOF 33	October 7, 2016	1	3:14	Kansas City, Missouri, United States	
Win	19–6	Caros Fodor	Decision (unanimous)	WSOF 27	January 23, 2016	3	5:00	Memphis, Tennessee, United States	
Win	18–6	Tyson Griffin	Decision (unanimous)	WSOF 10	June 21, 2014	3	5:00	Las Vegas, Nevada, United States	
Win	17–6	Jacob Volkmann	Decision (unanimous)	WSOF 6	October 26, 2013	3	5:00	Coral Gables, Florida, United States	WSOF debut.
Win	16–6	Luis Palomino	Decision (unanimous)	CFA 09: Night of Champions	January 19, 2013	5	5:00	Coral Gables, Florida, United States	Won the CFA Lightweight Championship.
Win	15–6	Toby Imada	Decision (unanimous)	CFA 08: Araujo vs. Bradley	October 6, 2012	3	5:00	Hollywood, Florida, United States	CFA Lightweight Championship eliminator.
Win	14–6	Johnavan Vistante	Submission (arm-triangle choke)	CFA 07: Never Give Up	June 30, 2012	1	4:31	Coral Gables, Florida, United States	
Loss	13–6	John Alessio	Decision (unanimous)	Superior Cage Combat 3	November 4, 2011	3	5:00	Las Vegas, Nevada, United States	
Loss	13–5	Francisco Trinaldo	Submission (kneebar)	Bitetti Combat MMA 6	February 25, 2010	1	2:03	Brasília, Brazil	
Win	13–4	Ryan Healy	Decision (unanimous)	Shine Fights 2: ATT vs. The World	September 4, 2009	3	5:00	Miami, Florida, United States	
Loss	12–4	Tatsuya Kawajiri	Decision (unanimous)	Dream 3: Lightweight Grand Prix 2008 Second Round	May 11, 2008	2	5:00	Saitama, Japan	DREAM Lightweight Grand Prix quarterfinal.
Win	12–3	Kazuyuki Miyata	Submission (rear-naked choke)	Dream 1: Lightweight Grand Prix 2008 First Round	March 15, 2008	1	7:37	Saitama, Japan	DREAM Lightweight Grand Prix opening round.
Win	11–3	Nobuhiro Obiya	Decision (unanimous)	Pride - Bushido 13	November 5, 2006	2	5:00	Yokohama, Japan	
Loss	10–3	Tatsuya Kawajiri	Decision (unanimous)	Pride Bushido 8	July 17, 2005	2	5:00	Nagoya, Japan, Japan	
Loss	10–2	Luiz Azeredo	Decision (split)	Pride Bushido 6	April 3, 2005	2	5:00	Yokohama, Japan	
Win	10–1	Masakazu Imanari	Decision (unanimous)	Pride Bushido 5	October 14, 2004	2	5:00	Osaka, Japan	
Win	9–1	Hiroyuki Abe	Submission (arm-triangle choke)	Pride Bushido 4	July 19, 2004	1	2:56	Nagoya, Japan	
Win	8–1	Rafles la Rose	Submission (armbar)	Shooto: Switzerland 1	February 26, 2004	1	0:36	Zürich, Switzerland	Welterweight bout.
Win	7–1	Devanir Marques	Submission (punches)	Conquista Fight 1	December 20, 2003	1	1:10	Vitória da Conquista, Brazil	
Win	6–1	Kohei Yasumi	Decision (unanimous)	Shooto - 9/5 in Korakuen Hall	September 5, 2003	3	5:00	Tokyo, Japan	
Win	5–1	Tom Kirk	Submission (armbar)	Shooto: Midwest Fighting	May 21, 2003	1	3:38	Hammond, Indiana, United States	
Win	4–1	Musail Allaudinov	Decision (unanimous)	M-1 MFC - Russia vs. the World 5	April 6, 2003	1	15:00	St. Petersburg, Russia	
Win	3–1	Sergei Bytchkov	TKO (punches)	M-1 MFC: Russia vs. the World 3	April 26, 2002	2	2:38	St. Petersburg, Russia	Welterweight bout.
Loss	2–1	Eli Soares	Decision	WVC: World Vale Tudo Championship 10	May 27, 2000	1	30:00	Recife, Brazil	WVC Welterweight Tournament finals.
Win	2–0	Sergei Bytchkov	Decision (unanimous)	WVC: World Vale Tudo Championship 10	May 27, 2000	2	14:00	Recife, Brazil	WVC Welterweight Tournament semifinals.
Win	1–0	Reginaldo Santana	Submission (verbal)	WVC: World Vale Tudo Championship 10	May 27, 2000	1	3:29	Recife, Brazil	WVC Welterweight Tournament quarterfinals.
