= World Series of Fighting 6: Burkman vs. Carl =

World Series of Fighting mixed martial arts event in 2013

- Promotion: World Series of Fighting
- Date: October 26, 2013
- Venue: BankUnited Center
- City: Coral Gables, Florida, United States
- Attendance: 3,814

Event chronology
World Series of Fighting 5: Arlovski vs. Kyle	World Series of Fighting 6: Burkman vs. Carl	World Series of Fighting 7: Karakhanyan vs. Palmer

World Series of Fighting 6: Burkman vs. Carl was a mixed martial arts event held October 26, 2013 in Coral Gables, Florida, United States.

== Background ==
This event featured the first WSOF Championship bout between Josh Burkman and Steve Carl.

== Results ==
Main Card (NBC Sports)
Weight class				Method	Round	Time	Notes
Welterweight	Steve Carl	def.	Josh Burkman	Technical Submission (triangle choke)	4	1:02	(Note: For the inaugural WSOF Welterweight Championship.)
Bantamweight	Marlon Moraes	def.	Carson Beebe	KO (punches)	1	0:32
Welterweight	Jon Fitch	def.	Marcelo Alfaya	Decision (split) (29–28, 28–29, 29–28)	3	5:00
Lightweight	Justin Gaethje	def.	Dan Lauzon	KO (punches)	2	1:40
Preliminary Card (Sherdog.com)
Featherweight	Pablo Alfonso	def.	Miguel Torres	Submission (guillotine choke)	1	3:05
Lightweight	Luiz Firmino	def.	Jacob Volkmann	Decision (unanimous) (29–28, 29–28, 30–27)	3	5:00
Bantamweight	Chad Robichaux	def.	Andrew Yates	Technical Submission (north-south choke)	2	4:09
Bantamweight	Josh Rettinghouse	def.	Alexis Vila	Decision (unanimous) (29–28, 29–28, 29–28)	3	5:00
Featherweight	Nick LoBosco	def.	Fabio Mello	KO (head kick and punches)	1	2:02
Featherweight	Alexandre Pimentel	def.	Jade Porter	Submission (triangle choke)	3	3:05
Postliminary card
Light Heavyweight	Francisco France	vs.	Hans Stringer	Draw (unanimous) (28–28, 28–28, 28–28)	3	5:00

== See also ==
- World Series of Fighting
- List of WSOF champions
- List of WSOF events
