= World Series of Fighting 29: Gaethje vs. Foster =

- Promotion: World Series of Fighting
- Date: March 12, 2016
- Venue: Bank of Colorado Arena
- City: Greeley, Colorado
- Attendance: 1,108
- Total gate: $85,453

Event chronology
World Series of Fighting 28: Moraes vs. Barajas	World Series of Fighting 29: Gaethje vs. Foster	World Series of Fighting 30: Branch vs. Starks

World Series of Fighting 29: Gaethje vs. Foster was a mixed martial arts event held on March 12, 2016 at the Bank of Colorado Arena in Greeley, Colorado.

== Background ==
The event was headlined by a WSOF Lightweight Championship fight between champion Justin Gaethje and Brian Foster. It was originally expected to take place at Budweiser Events Center in Loveland, Colorado, but on January 23, WSOF announced that it would take place at Bank of Colorado Arena in Greeley, Colorado.

== Results ==
Main Card (NBCSN)
Weight class				Method	Round	Time	Notes
Lightweight	Justin Gaethje (c)	def.	Brian Foster	TKO (leg kicks)	1	1:43	(Note: For the WSOF Lightweight Championship.)
Heavyweight	Josh Copeland	def.	Mike Hayes	Decision (unanimous) (30–27, 30–27, 30–27)	3	5:00
Middleweight	Louis Taylor	def.	Cory Devela	Technical Submission (guillotine choke)	1	0:29
Welterweight	Kris Hocum	def.	Josh Cavan	Decision (split) (29–28, 28–29, 29–28)	3	5:00
Preliminary Card (WSOF.com)
Middleweight	Ian Heinisch	def.	Tyler Vogel	Decision (unanimous) (30–26, 30–26, 29–27)	3	5:00
Featherweight	Josh Huber	def.	Clay Wimer	Decision (unanimous) (30–27, 30–27, 30–27)	3	5:00
Bantamweight	Brandon Royval	def.	Danny Mainus	KO (knee)	1	2:48
Amateur bouts
Lightweight	Justin Gonzales (c)	def.	Patrick Davis	TKO (punches)	1	2:19	(Note: For the Sparta Lightweight Championship.)
Light Heavyweight	Chris Morgan	def.	Jacob Flesher	KO (punches)	1	1:04	(Note: For the Sparta Light Heavyweight Championship.)
Featherweight	Gerald Scott	def.	Donovan Alirez	Submission (rear-naked choke)	2	2:45
Bantamweight	Dylan Stubblefield	def.	Joe Guerrero	Technical Submission (rear-naked choke)	1	2:35
Bantamweight	Steven Peters	def.	Sean Mahany	Technical Submission (guillotine choke)	1	1:30

== See also ==
- List of WSOF events
- List of WSOF champions
