= Justin Gaethje =

American mixed martial artist (born 1988)

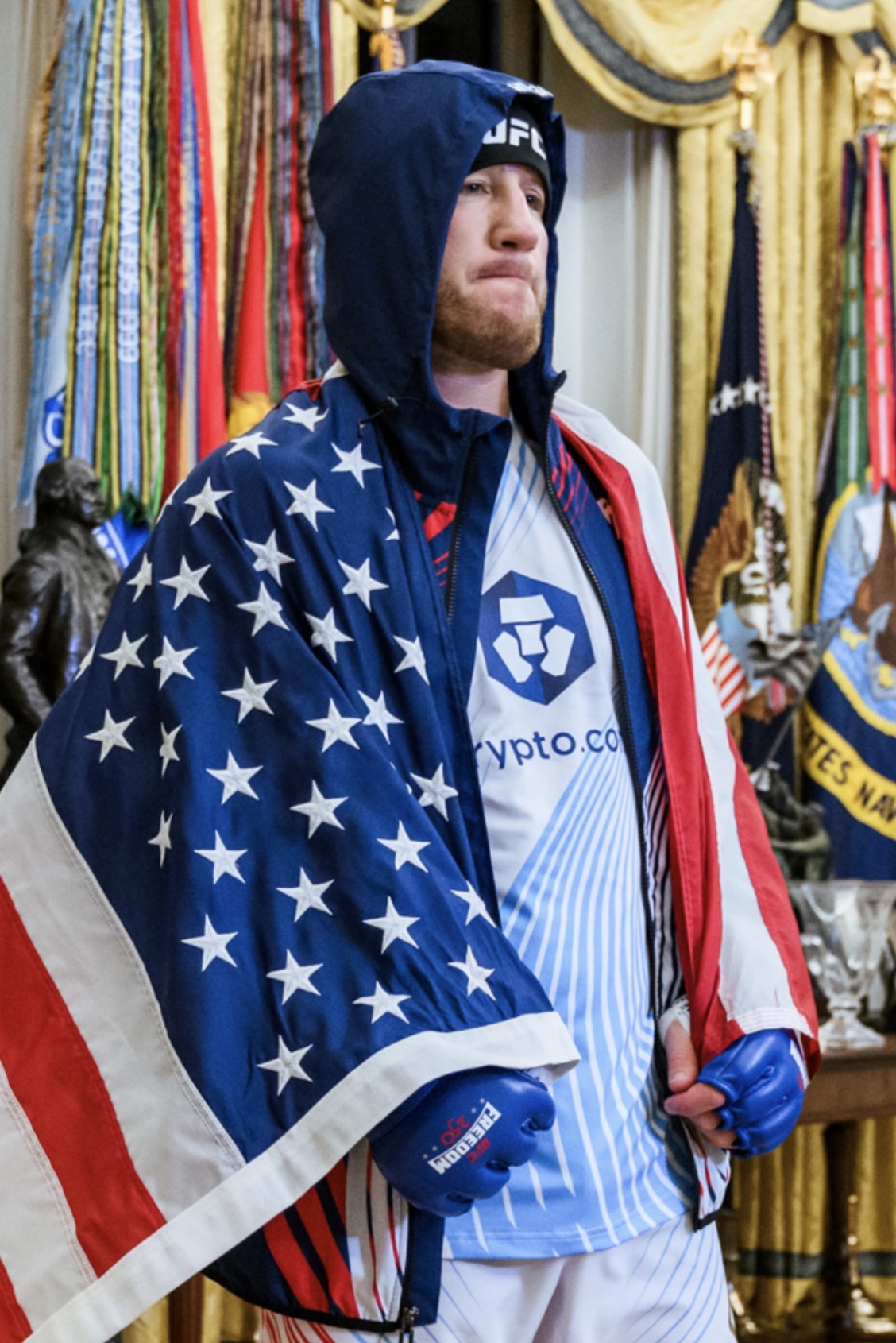
- Gaethje at the White House in June 2026
- Born: Justin Ray Gaethje; November 14, 1988 (age 37); Safford, Arizona, U.S.
- Nickname: The Highlight
- Height: 5 ft 11 in (1.80 m)
- Weight: 155 lb (70 kg; 11.1 st)
- Division: Lightweight
- Reach: 70 in (178 cm)
- Stance: Orthodox
- Fighting out of: Denver, Colorado, U.S.
- Team: Grudge Training Center (2011–2016); Genesis Training Center; Elevation Fight Team
- Trainer: Trevor Wittman (2011–present)
- Wrestling: NCAA Division I Wrestling
- Years active: 2011–present

Mixed martial arts record
- Total: 33
- Wins: 28
- By knockout: 21
- By submission: 1
- By decision: 6
- Losses: 5
- By knockout: 3
- By submission: 2

Amateur record
- Total: 7
- Wins: 7
- By knockout: 4
- By submission: 2
- By decision: 1

Other information
- University: University of Northern Colorado
- Mixed martial arts record from Sherdog

YouTube information
- Channel: Justin Gaethje
- Subscribers: 145 k
- Views: 13.1 m
- Last updated: June 27, 2026

Justin Ray Gaethje (/ˈɡeɪdʒi/ GAY-jee; born November 14, 1988) is an American professional mixed martial artist. A professional since 2011, he competes in the lightweight division of the Ultimate Fighting Championship (UFC), where he is the current UFC Lightweight Champion. He is the first fighter in UFC history to win the interim lightweight title twice and is also a former UFC "BMF" titleholder. Gaethje formerly competed in the lightweight division of the World Series of Fighting (WSOF), where he was the first and only WSOF Lightweight Champion. As of September 22, 2026, he is #3 in the UFC men's pound-for-pound rankings.

Nicknamed "the Highlight," five of Gaethje's bouts—against Michael Johnson, Eddie Alvarez, Dustin Poirier, Michael Chandler, and Max Holloway—have been named Fight of the Year by multiple media outlets. He has earned 17 post-fight bonus awards in 16 UFC appearances, the highest bonuses-per-fight rate in UFC history, and holds the record for the most Fight of the Night bonuses in UFC history, with 11. At 37 years old, he became the oldest fighter to win a UFC lightweight title. As of July 2026, Fight Matrix ranks him as the sixth-greatest lightweight fighter of all time.

== Early life ==
Justin Ray Gaethje was born in Safford, Arizona, on November 14, 1988. His mother, Carolina (née Espinoza), is of Mexican descent from Naco, Sonora, Mexico, and his father, John Ray Gaethje, is of German descent. His mother was a postmaster while his father was a copper miner, as were both of his grandfathers. His paternal grandfather boxed while serving in the United States Army. Gaethje's father Ray retired as a copper miner in September 2019, after 36 years working at the Morenci mine.

Gaethje has two sisters. He also has a twin brother who worked at the Morenci mine for almost ten years. When he was 18, Gaethje spent a summer himself at the Morenci mine. He said to Brett Okamoto of ESPN in 2020, "I worked 7 days a week, 12 hours every day. I did it for 3 months straight and took one sick day, because I had to sleep. I did 96 hours one week." Gaethje recalled that as he was about to leave the mine to go to college, two of his co-workers told him, "You'll be right back, you ain't gonna make it in college. You'll be right back here." This motivated Gaethje to make a success of himself.

== Wrestling career ==
=== High school ===
Gaethje began wrestling at the age of four. He attended Safford High School, where he was a four-time finalist and two-time state champion (AIA). He still holds the seventh-most near falls (218) and the ninth-most team points scored (1057.5) in the history of the state as a wrestler. Gaethje also played football and baseball in high school.

=== Collegiate ===
Gaethje graduated from Safford High School with a 191–9 record. He initially applied to a small college in Arizona as he wanted to stay close to his family, but instead accepted an offer from the NCAA Division I program at the University of Northern Colorado. As a freshman, Gaethje had an 18–9 record, including a third-place finish at the Oregon Wrestling Classic, winning the NCAA Western Regional Championships, and earning Western Wrestling All-Conference First Team honors. In his sophomore season, he qualified for the 2009 NCAA Division I 157 lb Championship, where he posted a 0–2 record. He finished the season with a 14–4 record and was again named to the Western Wrestling All-Conference First Team.

As a junior, Gaethje went 5–2 at the 2010 NCAA Division I 157 lb Championship to earn 7th place and All-American status. This made him the first Northern Colorado wrestler to attain Division I All-American status since Larry Wagner in 1970. Gaethje dropped down to the 149 lb division for his senior year, but had struggles with weight cutting. He won true-second at the NCAA Western Regional Championships and so qualified for the 2011 NCAA Division I 149 lb Championship, where he posted a 1–2 record to end his senior season with a 17–8 record.

In June 2020, it was announced that Gaethje would be inducted into the University of Northern Colorado Athletics Hall of Fame for his achievements in wrestling.

== Mixed martial arts career ==
=== Early career ===
Gaethje first came into contact with mixed martial arts (MMA) as a freshman at the University of Northern Colorado, when he wrestled Ultimate Fighting Championship (UFC) fighters such as Georges St-Pierre, Clay Guida and future opponent Donald Cerrone. Afterward, he talked to his coaches about his intentions on trying out the new sport, to which he was told that he had to get his grades up in order to get an amateur bout. After improving his grades, Gaethje made his amateur debut during the pre-season of his sophomore year (08'-09') on August 2, 2008, where he scored a slam knockout on his opponent.

After amassing a 7–0 amateur record, Gaethje made his professional debut on August 20, 2011, against future UFC fighter Kevin Croom. Gaethje won the fight in the first round via KO due to a slam after Croom attempted a submission. On the regional circuit in Colorado and Arizona, Gaethje compiled an undefeated 7–0 professional record, with 6 stoppage wins. One of his early victories was over UFC veteran Drew Fickett. Gaethje won by knockout 12 seconds into the first round.

=== World Series of Fighting ===
Gaethje was signed by the World Series of Fighting on December 2, 2012, and made his debut on March 23, 2013, at WSOF 2 against Gesias Cavalcante, finishing the fight in the first round through TKO (doctor stoppage) after opening a cut above Cavalcante's left eye.

On June 14, 2013, he fought Brian Cobb at WSOF 3, eventually winning via TKO from leg kicks in the third round.

Afterward, Gaethje fought Dan Lauzon at WSOF 6 on October 26, 2013, finishing Lauzon by knockout with a right uppercut in the second round.

The three stoppage victories secured Gaethje a shot at the inaugural WSOF Lightweight Championship, in the headline bout of WSOF 8 against Richard Patishnock on January 18, 2014. Gaethje dispatched Patishnock in the first round via TKO to become the first WSOF Lightweight Champion.

His first title defense was at WSOF 11 against Nick Newell on July 5, 2014. Gaethje won the fight with a right hook TKO in the second round.

On November 15, 2014, Gaethje faced UFC veteran and former training partner Melvin Guillard at WSOF 15. The fight was ruled a non-title contest after Guillard missed weight. He scaled at 158.8 lbs, nearly 4 lbs over the 155 lb limit, and 50% of his purse went to Gaethje. Gaethje won the bout via split decision.

He then went on to fight Luis Palomino at WSOF 19 on March 28, 2015. Gaethje defended his title by stopping Palomino via TKO in the third round after a combination of leg kicks and punches. The Los Angeles Times named this fight as the best fight of 2015.

Gaethje had a rematch against Palomino on September 18, 2015, at WSOF 23 and defended his belt again, finishing Palomino in the second round by TKO.

At WSOF 29 on March 12, 2016, he defended his belt against Brian Foster via TKO due to leg kicks at 1:43 of the first round. Three days later, Gaethje was suspended indefinitely by the Colorado State Athletic Commission for "unsportsmanlike conduct" after he performed his signature celebration, a backflip off the top of the cage, in the aftermath of his victory at WSOF 29. The suspension was lifted a day later.

Gaethje was expected to defend the WSOF Lightweight Championship against Ozzy Dugulubgov at WSOF 33 on October 7, 2016. However, the bout was cancelled on the day of the event as Dugulubgov was stricken with illness.

On October 17, 2016, it was announced that Gaethje would defend the WSOF Lightweight Championship against João Zeferino on December 31, 2016, at WSOF 34 in the main event. However, an injury forced Zeferino to withdraw from the bout and he was replaced by Luiz Firmino. Gaethje won the bout by TKO via doctor stoppage due to Firmino's right eye being swollen after round three.

=== Ultimate Fighting Championship ===
On May 4, 2017, Gaethje announced he had vacated his WSOF title and signed with the Ultimate Fighting Championship. It was announced on May 12 that he would make his debut against the veteran Michael Johnson on July 7, at The Ultimate Fighter: Redemption Finale. Gaethje won the back-and-forth fight via TKO in the second round through a combination of punches and knees. The win earned Gaethje the Fight of the Night and Performance of the Night awards. Sherdog named this fight as the best fight of 2017, and round 2 of the fight as the best round of the year.

On July 13, 2017, the UFC announced that Gaethje would coach The Ultimate Fighter 26 along with Eddie Alvarez, with the duo expected to face each other at the conclusion of the season. The bout with Alvarez took place on December 2, 2017, at UFC 218. Gaethje lost the competitive fight by KO in the third round, the first loss of his MMA career. The fight also earned him his second consecutive Fight of the Night bonus award. At the World MMA Awards, it was named the fight of the year. Gaethje said after the loss, "It was the time of my life. Honestly, being in front of that many people, being able to put my skills on the line at the highest level on a pay-per-view, all of those things, it was a dream come true for me. I said it before, I said it many times, that I was going to lose (eventually). If I lost, I hoped that I would get knocked out. All of those things came true."

Gaethje lost a back-and-forth fight via TKO in the fourth round to Dustin Poirier on April 14, 2018, at UFC on Fox 29. The fight earned Gaethje his third consecutive Fight of the Night bonus award. Sherdog named Gaethje vs. Poirier as the best fight of 2018. It was revealed after the fight that Gaethje's leg kicks had caused a partial tear of Poirier's quadriceps femoris muscle. Poirier said, "I didn't know it in the fight, but I knew it the night of and the next morning. He tore my quad. I'm trying to think of another time I've been seriously damaged with kicks. Jim Miller hurt my calf really good, but nothing like that."

Gaethje was scheduled to fight Al Iaquinta on August 25, 2018, at UFC Fight Night 135. However, on June 28, 2018, Iaquinta withdrew from the bout and he was replaced by James Vick. Gaethje rebounded from his two losses in emphatic fashion, winning the fight by knockout in the first round. He was also awarded a Performance of Night award, which meant he had earned five bonus awards in his four fights in UFC.

Gaethje faced Edson Barboza on March 30, 2019, at UFC on ESPN 2. He won the fight via knockout in the first round. This fight earned him the Fight of the Night award.

Gaethje next faced Donald Cerrone on September 14, 2019, in the main event at UFC on ESPN+ 16. He won the fight via TKO in the first round. The win also earned Gaethje his third Performance of the Night bonus award.

==== UFC interim Lightweight Champion and further title contention ====
On April 6, it was announced that Gaethje would step in on short notice to face Tony Ferguson for the interim UFC Lightweight Championship on April 18, at UFC 249. However, on April 9, UFC president Dana White announced that this event had been postponed, and the bout instead took place for May 9, 2020. Gaethje dominated the fight, stopping Ferguson via TKO in the fifth round, and thus ending Ferguson's personal best of 12 consecutive wins. He also continued his bonus award streak, earning the Fight of the Night and Performance of the Night awards. This made Gaethje the only fighter in UFC history to win at least one fight night bonus in each of his first seven appearances.

Gaethje fought in a unification bout for the UFC Lightweight Championship against Khabib Nurmagomedov on October 24, 2020, at UFC 254. He lost the fight via technical submission due to triangle choke in the second round, marking the first submission loss in his mixed martial arts career. Despite tapping, referee Jason Herzog did not stop the bout before Gaethje lost consciousness due to the choke.

Gaethje faced former Bellator Lightweight Champion Michael Chandler at UFC 268 on November 6, 2021. After a back-and-forth fight, Gaethje won the bout via unanimous decision despite knocking Chandler down and nearly finishing him in the second round. This bout earned the Fight of the Night award. The bout was named Fight of the Year by various mixed martial arts media outlets and the UFC itself.

Gaethje faced Charles Oliveira on May 7, 2022, at UFC 274 for the vacant UFC Lightweight Championship. Due to Oliveira missing weight and having been stripped of the title, only Gaethje was eligible to win the title. Despite knocking down Oliveira twice, Gaethje lost the fight via rear–naked choke submission in round one.

Gaethje faced Rafael Fiziev on March 18, 2023, at UFC 286. He won the back–and–forth fight via majority decision. This fight earned him the Fight of the Night bonus award.

Gaethje took on Dustin Poirier in a rematch of their 2018 bout, for the symbolic "BMF" ("baddest motherfucker") belt on July 29, 2023, at UFC 291. He won the fight via head kick knockout in round two. The win earned Gaethje his fifth Performance of the Night bonus award.

Gaethje faced Max Holloway on April 13, 2024, at UFC 300. He lost the BMF championship by knockout in the last second of round five. Gaethje took home a $300,000 fight of the night bonus.

Gaethje was scheduled to face Dan Hooker on March 8, 2025 at UFC 313. However, Hooker had to withdraw from the bout due to a hand injury and was replaced by Rafael Fiziev in a rematch. Gaethje defeated Fiziev via unanimous decision. This fight earned him another Fight of the Night award.

==== UFC Lightweight Champion ====
Gaethje competed for the Interim UFC Lightweight Championship against Paddy Pimblett on January 24, 2026 at UFC 324. He won the fight by unanimous decision. This fight earned him a $100,000 Fight of the Night award.

Gaethje faced undefeated champion Ilia Topuria in a title unification bout for the undisputed UFC Lightweight Championship on June 14, 2026 at UFC Freedom 250. He won the championship by technical knockout via corner stoppage at the end of the fourth round in the main event, handing Topuria his first defeat in mixed martial arts. This fight earned him a $400,000 Fight of the Night award and $425,000 Performance of the Night award totaling $825,000. In addition, Gaethje and opponent Topuria split a $1 million CRO Crypto.com bonus, receiving $500,000 each.

== Fighting style ==
As a two-time Arizona State high school champion and an NCAA Division I All-American, Gaethje has some of the best wrestling credentials in the UFC's lightweight division. Despite his high-level wrestling pedigree, he rarely looks for takedowns, instead preferring an entertaining stand-up fighting style. He is well known for the knockout power in his punches, and his debilitating leg kicks. When asked after his loss to Poirier in 2018 why he did not use his wrestling in the bout, Gaethje said:

I’ve been wrestling my whole life. I should’ve and could’ve took him down a couple of times, especially when I had him rocked just to steal a round or two. For some reason, my mind will not let me do it. I think I sold myself so hard on the fact that this is not wrestling. It gets you tired. If I’m going to get tired, I’d rather it be from fighting and not from wrestling. That’s the reason why I never wanted to wrestle. But I did so much cardio this camp that it would not have been a problem for me to turn it into a wrestling match, but I just can’t do it, it would not be fun for me."

In a 2020 ESPN interview, Gaethje stated he realized after transitioning from wrestling to mixed martial arts that, while winning was still important, entertaining the fans could earn him more money. He said: "There can be guys out there who are 13–0 with 13 decisions, and they're not [even] getting paid $5,000 to fight because nobody is watching. I've gotten opportunities on the biggest stages because of the way I fight. I've never not wanted to win a belt, but I wanted to make money, and the surest way to make money in this sport was to be exciting." According to Gaethje's coach Trevor Wittman, the back-to-back losses against Alvarez and Poirier caused Gaethje to change his mentality. Although he is still a pressure fighter, Wittman said that Gaethje now takes fewer risks and is more selective about when to trade punches. Wittman stated: "I asked him after those two losses, 'Is your purpose still to be the most exciting fighter in the world?' And he said, 'Not really, Coach. I want to be a UFC champion.'"

== Personal life ==
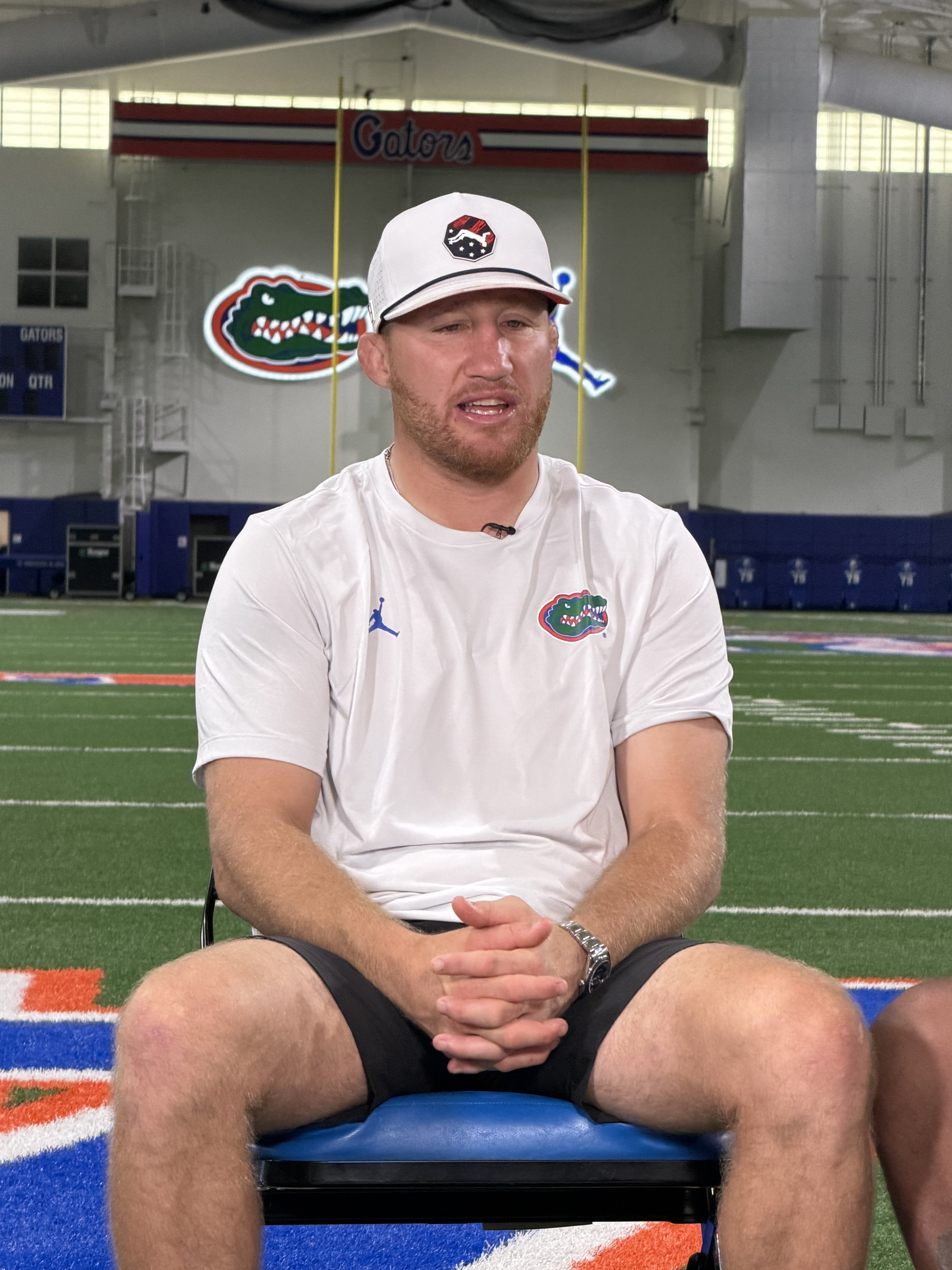
Justin Gaethje meeting with the Florida Gators football team in August 2026

Gaethje holds a bachelor's degree in human services from the University of Northern Colorado. He has stated his intention to do social work with at-risk youth.

Gaethje underwent a photorefractive keratectomy in 2016 to correct his eyesight. He said, "I used to be blind. I had horrible vision. I was 20/60 in one eye and 20/200 in another eye. And I was far sighted in one eye and nearsighted in another eye." Dan Hardy stated on Inside the Octagon that before the surgery Gaethje's "eyesight was so bad that he actually had to physically be in contact with his opponent to know what he was hitting."

Gaethje—along with UFC President Dana White, fighters Colby Covington and Henry Cejudo, and manager Ali Abdelaziz—attended a rally for President Donald Trump in September 2020, with the fighters being acknowledged by the President. Gaethje praised Trump for his role in the UFC's early development, saying "He’s a reason that the UFC is here." On the first day of the 2026 Republican National Convention, Gaethje and UFC fighter Bo Nickal introduced Trump together. Gaethje encouraged the audience to vote in the then-upcoming midterm elections with their enthusiasm for the 2024 presidential election lest the country's right-wing be "knocked out".

Gaethje has his own YouTube channel. He and fellow UFC fighter Kamaru Usman cameoed as MMA fighters in the 2025 revival of The Naked Gun. In 2026, Gaethje participated in the second edition of the Internet Invitational golf tournament.

== Championships and accomplishments ==
=== Wrestling ===
- National Collegiate Athletic Association
  - NCAA Division I All-American out of the University of Northern Colorado (2010)
  - NCAA Division I 157 lb (2010) Championship – 7th Place
- University of Northern Colorado Athletics Hall of Fame – Class of 2020

=== Mixed martial arts ===
- Ultimate Fighting Championship
  - UFC Lightweight Championship (One time, Current)
  - Interim UFC Lightweight Championship (Two times)
    - Oldest fighter in history to win a UFC Lightweight title (37 years, 71 days)
    - First two-time UFC Interim Champion
    - Tied (Jens Pulver & Frankie Edgar) for third most UFC lightweight title fight wins (3)
    - Tied (B.J. Penn) for most knockouts in UFC Lightweight title bouts (2)
  - UFC 'BMF' title (One time)
    - Second UFC fighter to win an Interim, Undisputed and BMF title
  - Fight of the Night (Eleven times) vs. Michael Johnson, Eddie Alvarez, Dustin Poirier 1, Edson Barboza, Tony Ferguson, Michael Chandler, Rafael Fiziev (x2), Max Holloway, Paddy Pimblett and Ilia Topuria
    - Most Fight of the Night bonuses in UFC history (11)
    - First fighter to receive Fight of the Night bonuses in four consecutive bouts
    - Tied (Donald Cerrone) for second most Fight of the Night bonuses in UFC/WEC combined history (11) (behind Cub Swanson)
  - Performance of the Night (Six times) vs. Michael Johnson, James Vick, Donald Cerrone, Tony Ferguson, Dustin Poirier 2 and Ilia Topuria
    - Most Post-Fight bonuses in UFC Lightweight division history (17)
    - Third most Post-Fight bonuses in UFC history (17)
    - Most Post-Fight bonuses-per-bout in UFC history (17 bonuses in 16 bouts) (for fighters with 4+ UFC fights)
    - Only fighter in UFC history to win a Post-Fight bonus in each of his first 7 UFC bouts
    - Only fighter in UFC history to earn multiple Post‑Fight bonuses in three separate bouts vs. Michael Johnson, Tony Ferguson and Ilia Topuria
    - $500,000 CRO Crypto.com UFC Freedom 250 bonus winner
  - Third highest significant strike accuracy percentage in UFC Lightweight division history (57.6%)
  - Tied (Melvin Guillard & Edson Barboza) for third most knockouts in UFC Lightweight division history (7)
  - Tied (Drew Dober & Edson Barboza) for fifth most knockdowns landed in UFC Lightweight division history (10)
  - Fifth most significant strikes landed in UFC Lightweight division history (1271)
  - Holds wins over three former UFC champions — vs. Ilia Topuria, Tony Ferguson (interim) and Dustin Poirier (interim)
  - UFC Honors Awards
    - 2019: President's Choice Fight of the Year Nominee vs. Edson Barboza
    - 2021: President's Choice Fight of the Year Winner vs. Michael Chandler
    - 2023: President's Choice Fight of the Year Nominee vs. Rafael Fiziev 1 & Fan's Choice Knockout of the Year Nominee vs. Dustin Poirier 2
    - 2024: President's Choice Fight of the Year Winner vs. Max Holloway
  - UFC.com Awards
    - 2017: Fight of the Year vs. Michael Johnson, Ranked #2 Fight of the Year vs. Eddie Alvarez & Ranked #3 Newcomer of the Year
    - 2018: Ranked #2 Fight of the Year vs. Dustin Poirier 1
    - 2019: Top 10 Fighter of the Year & Ranked #7 Fight of the Year vs. Edson Barboza
    - 2020: Ranked #6 Fight of the Year vs. Tony Ferguson
    - 2021: Fight of the Year vs. Michael Chandler
    - 2023: Ranked #8 Fighter of the Year, Ranked #3 Knockout of the Year vs. Dustin Poirier 2 & Ranked #7 Fight of the Year vs. Rafael Fiziev 1
    - 2024: Ranked #3 Fight of the Year vs. Max Holloway
    - 2026: Half-Year Awards: Best Fighter of the 1HY
- World Series of Fighting
  - WSOF Lightweight Championship (One time; first; only)
    - Five successful title defenses
  - Most consecutive title defenses (five)
  - Most wins in title bouts (six)
  - Longest lightweight winning streak (10)
  - Most knockout wins (nine)
- Fight to Win Promotions
  - FTW Amateur Lightweight Championship (One time)
- World MMA Awards
  - 2017: Fight of the Year vs. Eddie Alvarez at UFC 218 & Comeback of the Year vs. Michael Johnson at The Ultimate Fighter: Redemption Finale
  - 2024: Fight of the Year vs. Max Holloway at UFC 300
- MMA Junkie
  - 2015 #2 Ranked Fight of the Year vs. Luis Palomino at WSOF 19
  - 2015 March Fight of the Month vs. Luis Palomino
  - 2015 September Fight of the Month vs. Luis Palomino
  - 2017 Fight of the Year vs. Michael Johnson at The Ultimate Fighter: Redemption Finale
  - 2017 #3 Ranked Fight of the Year vs. Eddie Alvarez at UFC 218
  - 2017 Round of the Year Round 1 vs. Michael Johnson at The Ultimate Fighter: Redemption Finale
  - 2018 Fight of the Year vs. Dustin Poirier at UFC on Fox: Poirier vs. Gaethje
  - 2018 April Fight of the Month vs. Dustin Poirier at UFC on Fox: Poirier vs. Gaethje
  - 2021 November Fight of the Month vs. Michael Chandler
  - 2021 Fight of the Year vs. Michael Chandler
  - 2023 March Fight of the Month vs. Rafael Fiziev
  - 2023 July Knockout of the Month vs. Dustin Poirier
  - 2024 April Fight of the Month vs. Max Holloway
  - 2025 March Fight of the Month vs. Rafael Fiziev
  - 2026 January Fight of the Month vs. Paddy Pimblett
  - 2026 June Fight of the Month vs. Ilia Topuria
- Yahoo! Sports
  - 2015 Best Fight of the Half-Year vs. Luis Palomino
  - 2017 Fight of the Year vs. Michael Johnson at The Ultimate Fighter: Redemption Finale
  - 2021 Fight of the Year vs. Michael Chandler
- MMA Fighting
  - 2017 Fight of the Year vs. Michael Johnson at The Ultimate Fighter: Redemption Finale
  - 2018 Fight of the Year vs. Dustin Poirier at UFC on Fox: Poirier vs. Gaethje
  - 2021 Fight of the year vs. Michael Chandler at UFC 268
  - 2023 Second Team MMA All-Star
  - 2024 Fight of the Year vs. Max Holloway at UFC 300
- Sherdog
  - 2017 Fight of the Year vs. Michael Johnson
  - 2017 Round of the Year vs. Michael Johnson (Round 2)
  - 2018 Fight of the Year vs. Dustin Poirier
  - 2018 Round of the Year vs. Dustin Poirier (round 2)
  - 2021 Fight of the Year vs. Michael Chandler
  - 2021 Round of the Year vs. Michael Chandler (Round 1)
  - 2023 Round of the Year vs. Rafael Fiziev
- Bleacher Report
  - 2017 Fight of the Year vs. Michael Johnson
  - 2021 Fight of the Year vs. Michael Chandler
  - 2023 #3 Ranked UFC Fight of the Year vs. Rafael Fiziev at UFC 286
- RealSport
  - 2017 UFC Debut of the Year vs. Michael Johnson
- CBS Sports
  - 2017 UFC Fight of the Year vs. Michael Johnson
  - 2018 UFC Fight of the Year vs. Dustin Poirier
  - 2018 #3 Ranked UFC Knockout of the Year vs. James Vick
  - 2019 #4 Ranked UFC Knockout of the Year vs. Edson Barboza
  - 2021 UFC Fight of the Year vs. Michael Chandler
- Bloody Elbow
  - 2017 Best Fight of the Year vs. Michael Johnson
- Cageside Press
  - 2017 Fight of the Year vs. Michael Johnson
  - 2021 Fight of the Year vs. Michael Chandler
  - 2023 Knockout of the Year vs. Dustin Poirier
- MMA Weekly
  - 2017 Fight of the Year vs. Michael Johnson at The Ultimate Fighter: Redemption Finale
  - 2018 Fight of the Year vs. Dustin Poirier at UFC on Fox: Poirier vs. Gaethje
- Combat Press
  - 2017 Fight of the Year vs. Michael Johnson at The Ultimate Fighter: Redemption Finale
  - 2018 Fight of the Year vs. Dustin Poirier
  - 2021 Fight of the Year vs. Michael Chandler
  - 2023 Knockout of the Year vs. Dustin Poirier 2 at UFC 291
- MMADNA.nl
  - 2017 Fight of the Year vs. Eddie Alvarez
  - 2017 Debut of the Year.
- Lowkick MMA
  - 2021 Fight of the Year vs. Michael Chandler
- Daily Mirror
  - 2021 Fight of the Year vs. Michael Chandler
- Wrestling Observer Newsletter
  - MMA Match of the Year (2018) vs. Dustin Poirier at UFC on Fox: Poirier vs. Gaethje
  - MMA Match of the Year (2021) vs. Michael Chandler at UFC 268
  - MMA Match of the Year (2024) vs. Max Holloway at UFC 300
- ESPN
  - 2024 Fight of the Year vs. Max Holloway at UFC 300
- Sports Illustrated
  - 2017 Fight of the Year vs. Michael Johnson at The Ultimate Fighter: Redemption Finale
- Inside MMA
  - 2014 Breakthrough Fighter of the Year Bazzie Award
- MMA Sucka
  - 2018 Fight of the Year vs. Dustin Poirier at UFC on Fox: Poirier vs. Gaethje
- Slacky Awards
  - 2019 Technical Turn-Around of the Year

== Mixed martial arts record ==
Professional record breakdown
| 33 matches | 28 wins | 5 losses |
| By knockout | 21 | 3 |
| By submission | 1 | 2 |
| By decision | 6 | 0 |

| Res. | Record | Opponent | Method | Event | Date | Round | Time | Location | Notes |
|---|---|---|---|---|---|---|---|---|---|
| Win | 28–5 | Ilia Topuria | TKO (corner stoppage) | UFC Freedom 250 | June 14, 2026 | 4 | 5:00 | Washington, D.C., United States | Won and unified the UFC Lightweight Championship. Performance of the Night. Fight of the Night. |
| Win | 27–5 | Paddy Pimblett | Decision (unanimous) | UFC 324 | January 24, 2026 | 5 | 5:00 | Las Vegas, Nevada, United States | Won the interim UFC Lightweight Championship. Fight of the Night. |
| Win | 26–5 | Rafael Fiziev | Decision (unanimous) | UFC 313 | March 8, 2025 | 3 | 5:00 | Las Vegas, Nevada, United States | Fight of the Night. |
| Loss | 25–5 | Max Holloway | KO (punch) | UFC 300 | April 13, 2024 | 5 | 4:59 | Las Vegas, Nevada, United States | Lost the symbolic UFC "BMF" title. Fight of the Night. |
| Win | 25–4 | Dustin Poirier | KO (head kick) | UFC 291 | July 29, 2023 | 2 | 1:00 | Salt Lake City, Utah, United States | Won the symbolic UFC "BMF" title. Performance of the Night. |
| Win | 24–4 | Rafael Fiziev | Decision (majority) | UFC 286 | March 18, 2023 | 3 | 5:00 | London, England | Fight of the Night. |
| Loss | 23–4 | Charles Oliveira | Submission (rear-naked choke) | UFC 274 | May 7, 2022 | 1 | 3:22 | Phoenix, Arizona, United States | For the vacant UFC Lightweight Championship. Oliveira missed weight (155.5 lb) and was stripped of the title. Only Gaethje was eligible to win the title. |
| Win | 23–3 | Michael Chandler | Decision (unanimous) | UFC 268 | November 6, 2021 | 3 | 5:00 | New York City, New York, United States | Fight of the Night. |
| Loss | 22–3 | Khabib Nurmagomedov | Technical Submission (triangle choke) | UFC 254 | October 24, 2020 | 2 | 1:34 | Abu Dhabi, United Arab Emirates | For the UFC Lightweight Championship. |
| Win | 22–2 | Tony Ferguson | TKO (punch) | UFC 249 | May 9, 2020 | 5 | 3:39 | Jacksonville, Florida, United States | Won the interim UFC Lightweight Championship. Performance of the Night. Fight of the Night. |
| Win | 21–2 | Donald Cerrone | TKO (punches) | UFC Fight Night: Cowboy vs. Gaethje | September 14, 2019 | 1 | 4:18 | Vancouver, British Columbia, Canada | Performance of the Night. |
| Win | 20–2 | Edson Barboza | KO (punch) | UFC on ESPN: Barboza vs. Gaethje | March 30, 2019 | 1 | 2:30 | Philadelphia, Pennsylvania, United States | Fight of the Night. |
| Win | 19–2 | James Vick | KO (punches) | UFC Fight Night: Gaethje vs. Vick | August 25, 2018 | 1 | 1:27 | Lincoln, Nebraska, United States | Performance of the Night. |
| Loss | 18–2 | Dustin Poirier | TKO (punches) | UFC on Fox: Poirier vs. Gaethje | April 14, 2018 | 4 | 0:33 | Glendale, Arizona, United States | Gaethje was deducted one point in round 3 due to repeated eye pokes. Fight of the Night. |
| Loss | 18–1 | Eddie Alvarez | KO (knee) | UFC 218 | December 2, 2017 | 3 | 3:59 | Detroit, Michigan, United States | Fight of the Night. |
| Win | 18–0 | Michael Johnson | TKO (punches and knees) | The Ultimate Fighter: Redemption Finale | July 7, 2017 | 2 | 4:48 | Las Vegas, Nevada, United States | Performance of the Night. Fight of the Night. |
| Win | 17–0 | Luiz Firmino | TKO (doctor stoppage) | WSOF 34 | December 31, 2016 | 3 | 5:00 | New York City, New York, United States | Defended the WSOF Lightweight Championship. |
| Win | 16–0 | Brian Foster | TKO (leg kicks) | WSOF 29 | March 12, 2016 | 1 | 1:43 | Greeley, Colorado, United States | Defended the WSOF Lightweight Championship. |
| Win | 15–0 | Luis Palomino | TKO (punches) | WSOF 23 | September 18, 2015 | 2 | 4:30 | Phoenix, Arizona, United States | Defended the WSOF Lightweight Championship. |
| Win | 14–0 | Luis Palomino | TKO (leg kicks and punches) | WSOF 19 | March 28, 2015 | 3 | 3:57 | Phoenix, Arizona, United States | Defended the WSOF Lightweight Championship. |
| Win | 13–0 | Melvin Guillard | Decision (split) | WSOF 15 | November 15, 2014 | 3 | 5:00 | Tampa, Florida, United States | Non-title bout; Guillard missed weight (158.8 lb). |
| Win | 12–0 | Nick Newell | TKO (punches) | WSOF 11 | July 5, 2014 | 2 | 3:09 | Daytona Beach, Florida, United States | Defended the WSOF Lightweight Championship. |
| Win | 11–0 | Richard Patishnock | TKO (punches and elbows) | WSOF 8 | January 18, 2014 | 1 | 1:09 | Hollywood, Florida, United States | Won the inaugural WSOF Lightweight Championship. |
| Win | 10–0 | Dan Lauzon | KO (punches) | WSOF 6 | October 28, 2013 | 2 | 1:40 | Coral Gables, Florida, United States | |
| Win | 9–0 | Brian Cobb | TKO (leg kicks) | WSOF 3 | June 14, 2013 | 3 | 2:19 | Las Vegas, Nevada, United States | |
| Win | 8–0 | Gesias Cavalcante | TKO (doctor stoppage) | WSOF 2 | March 23, 2013 | 1 | 2:27 | Atlantic City, New Jersey, United States | |
| Win | 7–0 | Adrian Valdez | TKO (punches) | Rage in the Cage 164 | November 16, 2012 | 2 | 0:19 | Chandler, Arizona, United States | |
| Win | 6–0 | Drew Fickett | KO (punch) | Rage in the Cage 163 | October 20, 2012 | 1 | 0:12 | Chandler, Arizona, United States | Catchweight (165 lb) bout. |
| Win | 5–0 | Sam Young | Submission (rear-naked choke) | Rage in the Cage 162 | September 29, 2012 | 2 | 1:58 | Chandler, Arizona, United States | |
| Win | 4–0 | Marcus Edwards | Decision (unanimous) | Ring of Fire 43 | June 2, 2012 | 3 | 5:00 | Broomfield, Colorado, United States | |
| Win | 3–0 | Donnie Bell | TKO (punches) | Ring of Fire 42 | December 17, 2011 | 2 | 2:57 | Broomfield, Colorado, United States | |
| Win | 2–0 | Joe Kelso | TKO (punches) | Bring the Thunder MMA 2 | October 1, 2011 | 1 | 4:32 | Pueblo, Colorado, United States | Lightweight debut. |
| Win | 1–0 | Kevin Croom | KO (slam) | Ring of Fire 41 | August 20, 2011 | 1 | 1:01 | Broomfield, Colorado, United States | Catchweight (159 lb) bout. |

=== Amateur mixed martial arts record ===
| Amateur record breakdown | | |
| 7 matches | 7 wins | 0 losses |
| By knockout | 4 | 0 |
| By submission | 2 | 0 |
| By decision | 1 | 0 |

| Res. | Record | Opponent | Method | Event | Date | Round | Time | Location | Notes |
|---|---|---|---|---|---|---|---|---|---|
| Win | 7–0 | Aaron Carter | TKO (knees) | Ring of Fire 40 | April 16, 2011 | 3 | 1:48 | Broomfield, Colorado, United States | |
| Win | 6–0 | Scott Cleve | Decision (split) | Ring of Fire 38 | June 5, 2010 | 3 | 3:00 | Broomfield, Colorado United States | |
| Win | 5–0 | Steve Hanna | TKO (punches) | Fight to Win: War | April 17, 2010 | 1 | 1:01 | Denver, Colorado, United States | Won the FTW Lightweight Championship. Lightweight debut. |
| Win | 4–0 | Kevin Gonzales | Submission (armbar) | Ring of Fire 35 | August 1, 2009 | 1 | 1:20 | Broomfield, Colorado, United States | |
| Win | 3–0 | Nick Rhoads | Submission (armbar) | Rage in the Cage 127 | May 16, 2009 | 3 | 2:07 | Tucson, Arizona, United States | |
| Win | 2–0 | Austin Greer | TKO (punches) | Victory FC 27 | May 1, 2009 | 2 | 1:56 | Council Bluffs, Iowa, United States | |
| Win | 1–0 | Ben DeAnda | KO (punch) | Battle Under the Stars 1 | August 2, 2008 | 1 | 0:27 | Denver, Colorado, United States | Welterweight debut. |

== NCAA record ==
NCAA Championships Matches
| Res. | Record | Opponent | Score | Date | Event |
2011 NCAA Championships at 149 lbs
| Loss | 6–6 | Scott Sakaguchi | SV 6–8 | March 17, 2011 | 2011 NCAA Division I Wrestling Championship |
| Win | 6–5 | Don Vinson | 6–4 | March 17, 2011 | 2011 NCAA Division I Wrestling Championship |
| Loss | 5–5 | Ganbayar Sanjaa | 2–6 | March 17, 2011 | 2011 NCAA Division I Wrestling Championship |
2010 NCAA Championships 7th at 157 lbs
| Win | 5–4 | Stephen Brown | 12–7 | March 19, 2010 | 2010 NCAA Division I Wrestling Championship |
| Loss | 4–4 | Cyler Sanderson | 6–10 | March 19, 2010 | 2010 NCAA Division I Wrestling Championship |
| Win | 4–3 | Shane Vernon | TB 6–5 | March 19, 2010 | 2010 NCAA Division I Wrestling Championship |
| Loss | 3–3 | J.P O’ Connor | 1–8 | March 19, 2010 | 2010 NCAA Division I Wrestling Championship |
| Win | 3–2 | Matt Moley | TB 3–2 | March 19, 2010 | 2010 NCAA Division I Wrestling Championship |
| Win | 2–2 | Bryce Saddoris | 6–4 | March 19, 2010 | 2010 NCAA Division I Wrestling Championship |
| Win | 1–2 | Hadley Harrison | 5–4 | March 19, 2010 | 2010 NCAA Division I Wrestling Championship |
2009 NCAA Championships at 157 lbs
| Loss | 0–2 | Mike Kessler | 6–11 | March 19, 2009 | 2009 NCAA Division I Wrestling Championships |
| Loss | 0–1 | Neil Erisman | 3–8 | March 19, 2009 | 2009 NCAA Division I Wrestling Championships |

== Pay-per-view bouts ==
| No. | Event | Fight | Date | Venue | City | PPV buys |
|---|---|---|---|---|---|---|
| 1. | UFC 249 | Ferguson vs. Gaethje | May 9, 2020 | VyStar Veterans Memorial Arena | Jacksonville, Florida, U.S. | 700,000 |
| 2. | UFC 254 | Khabib vs. Gaethje | October 24, 2020 | Flash Forum | Yas Island, Abu Dhabi, UAE | 675,000 |
| 3. | UFC 274 | Oliveira vs. Gaethje | May 7, 2022 | Footprint Center | Phoenix, Arizona, U.S. | 400,000 |
| 4. | UFC 291 | Poirier vs. Gaethje 2 | July 29, 2023 | Delta Center | Salt Lake City, Utah, U.S. | 750,000 |
| Total sales | | | | | | 2,525,000 |

== See also ==
- List of current UFC fighters
- List of male mixed martial artists

Achievements
| Vacant Title last held by Dustin Poirier | 3rd UFC Interim Lightweight Champion; May 9, 2020 – October 24, 2020 | Vacant |
| Vacant Title last held by Jorge Masvidal | 2nd UFC BMF Champion; July 29, 2023 – April 13, 2024 | Succeeded by Max Holloway |
| Vacant Title last held by Himself | 4th UFC Interim Lightweight Champion; January 24, 2026 – June 14, 2026 | Vacant |
| Preceded by Ilia Topuria | 14th UFC Lightweight Champion; June 14, 2026 – present | Incumbent |
Awards
| Preceded by Miesha Tate vs. Holly Holm | World MMA Comeback of the Year; 2017 vs. Michael Johnson at The Ultimate Fighter: Redemption Finale | Succeeded by Angela Lee vs. Mei Yamaguchi |
| Preceded by Cub Swanson vs. Doo Ho Choi | World MMA Fight of the Year; 2017 vs. Eddie Alvarez at UFC 218 | Succeeded by Tony Ferguson vs. Anthony Pettis |
| Preceded by Islam Makhachev vs. Alexander Volkanovski | World MMA Fight of the Year; 2023–24 vs. Max Holloway at UFC 300 | Incumbent |
