= World Series of Fighting 34: Gaethje vs. Firmino =

World Series of Fighting MMA event in 2016

- Promotion: World Series of Fighting
- Date: December 31, 2016
- Venue: The Theater at Madison Square Garden
- City: New York City, New York, United States

Event chronology
World Series of Fighting 33: Branch vs. Magalhães	World Series of Fighting 34: Gaethje vs. Firmino	World Series of Fighting 35: Ivanov vs. Jordan

World Series of Fighting 34: Gaethje vs. Firmino was a mixed martial arts event promoted by the World Series of Fighting that was held on December 31, 2016 at The Theater at Madison Square Garden in New York City, New York. The event was set to air live in prime time on NBC.

== Background ==
The event was originally scheduled to be headlined by a Welterweight Championship bout between Champion Jon Fitch and former Strikeforce Middleweight Champion Jake Shields on November 12. On October 17, 2016, the World Series of Fighting announced that they cancelled their original plan of holding two separate events on November 12 and December 3. The main event was then scheduled to be headlined by WSOF Lightweight Champion Justin Gaethje and top contender João Zeferino while the co-main event will be the WSOF Welterweight Championship bout between Champion Jon Fitch and Jake Shields.

On October 24, 2016, it was announced that WSOF Bantamweight Champion Marlon Moraes would be defending his championship against WSOF newcomer Josenaldo Silva as the third and final fight on the main card while WSOF Middleweight Champion David Branch defends his championship against top contender Louis Taylor closing out as the final prelim bout of the night.

On December 13, 2016, it was announced that Zeferino was pulled from the title fight against Gaethje after suffering an injury, he was later replaced by Luis Firmino.

== Results ==
Main Card (NBC)
Weight class				Method	Round	Time	Notes
Lightweight	Justin Gaethje (c)	def.	Luiz Firmino	TKO (doctor stoppage)	3	5:00	(Note: For the WSOF Lightweight Championship.)
Welterweight	Jon Fitch (c)	def.	Jake Shields	Decision (unanimous) (49–46, 49–46, 49–46)	5	5:00	(Note: For the WSOF Welterweight Championship.)
Bantamweight	Marlon Moraes (c)	def.	Josenaldo Silva	TKO (knee injury)	1	2:30	(Note: For the WSOF Bantamweight Championship.)
Preliminary card (NBCSN)
Heavyweight	Caio Alencar	def.	Jared Rosholt	KO (punches)	1	1:17
Middleweight	David Branch (c)	def.	Louis Taylor	Submission (rear-naked choke)	5	2:00	(Note: For the WSOF Middleweight Championship.)
Light Heavyweight	Smealinho Rama	def.	Jake Heun	TKO (punches)	2	3:30
Preliminary card (WSOF.com)
Catchweight (150 lbs)	Shane Kruchten	def.	Jeremy Mahon	Decision (unanimous) (29–28, 29–28, 29–28)	3	5:00
Middleweight	Bruno Santos	def.	Vagab Vagabov	Decision (split) (29–28, 28–29, 29–28)	3	5:00
Featherweight	Andre Harrison	def.	Bruce Boyington	Submission (rear-naked choke)	1	1:54
Welterweight	Tom Marcellino	def.	Matt Denning	Submission (guillotine choke)	1	3:30
Postliminary card (WSOF.com)
Welterweight	Yushin Okami	def.	Paul Bradley	Decision (split) (29–28, 28–29, 29–28)	3	5:00

== See also ==
- List of WSOF events
- List of WSOF champions
