= World Series of Fighting 23: Gaethje vs. Palomino II =

World Series of Fighting MMA event in 2015

- Promotion: World Series of Fighting
- Date: September 18, 2015
- Venue: Comerica Theatre
- City: Phoenix, Arizona, United States
- Attendance: 5,000

Event chronology
World Series of Fighting 22: Palhares vs. Shields	World Series of Fighting 23: Gaethje vs. Palomino II	World Series of Fighting 24: Fitch vs. Okami

World Series of Fighting 23: Gaethje vs. Palomino II was a mixed martial arts event to be held September 18, 2015 in Phoenix, Arizona, United States. This event aired on NBCSN in the U.S and on Fight Network in Canada.

== Background ==
The main event was a rematch for the WSOF Lightweight Championship between champion and Arizona native Justin Gaethje making his third defense of his title against challenger Luis Palomino. Their first fight at WSOF 19 ended in a TKO victory for Gaethje.

The co-main event featured the tournament final fight for the inaugural WSOF Light Heavyweight Championship between middleweight champion David Branch and Teddy Holder.

This event also was the debut of Chael Sonnen on commentary.

The fight between Estevan Payan and Isaac Vallie-Flagg was canceled after Vallie-Flagg sustained an elbow injury.

== Results ==
Fight Card
Weight class				Method	Round	Time	Notes
Lightweight	Justin Gaethje (c)	def.	Luis Palomino	TKO (punches)	2	4:30	(Note: For the WSOF Lightweight Championship.)
Light Heavyweight	David Branch	def.	Teddy Holder	Submission (rear-naked choke)	1	2:21	(Note: For the inaugural WSOF Light Heavyweight Championship.)
Bantamweight	Timur Valiev	def.	Tito Jones	Decision (unanimous) (30–27, 30–27, 29–28)	3	5:00
Catchweight (160 lb)	Phoenix Jones	def.	Roberto Yong	Submission (leg scissor choke)	1	3:09
Lightweight	Brian Foster	def.	LaRue Burley	KO (punch)	1	0:32
Preliminary Card (WSOF.com)
Middleweight	Vagab Vagabov	def.	Brian Grinnell	TKO (knees and punches)	2	2:29
Middleweight	Clifford Starks	def.	Krasimir Mladenov	Decision (unanimous) (30–27, 30–27, 29–28)	3	5:00
Welterweight	Matthew Frincu	def.	Danny Davis Jr.	Decision (split) (28–29, 30–27, 29–28)	3	5:00
Bantamweight	David Nuzzo	def.	Andres Ponce	Decision (unanimous) (29–28, 30–27, 30–27)	3	5:00
Bantamweight	Joey Miolla	def.	Randy Steinke	KO (knee)	2	3:55
Lightweight	Benny Madrid	def.	Jeff Fletcher	Submission (rear-naked choke)	1	1:26

=== Tournament bracket ===
Semifinals
David Branch	SUB
Jesse McElligott	2
Thiago Silva	TKO
Teddy Holder	1

Finals
David Branch	SUB
Teddy Holder	1

== See also ==
- World Series of Fighting
- List of WSOF champions
- List of WSOF events
