= Brian Foster (fighter) =

American mixed martial arts fighter

- Born: April 3, 1984 (age 42); Sallisaw, Oklahoma, United States
- Height: 5 ft 10 in (1.78 m)
- Weight: 155 lb (70 kg; 11.1 st)
- Division: Welterweight; Lightweight
- Reach: 73 in (190 cm)
- Stance: Orthodox
- Fighting out of: Muldrow, Oklahoma , United States
- Team: Family Combat Fitness
- Years active: 2006–present

Kickboxing record
- Total: 4
- Wins: 3
- By knockout: 3
- Losses: 1
- By knockout: 1

Mixed martial arts record
- Total: 41
- Wins: 29
- By knockout: 15
- By submission: 13
- By decision: 1
- Losses: 12
- By knockout: 2
- By submission: 9
- By disqualification: 1

Other information
- Mixed martial arts record from Sherdog
- Last updated on: October 12, 2013

Brian Foster (born April 3, 1984) is an American mixed martial artist and kickboxer currently competing for the Professional Fighters League. A professional since 2006, he has also competed for the UFC. He won the WSOF Lightweight Tournament in 2015. Only one of his 41 career bouts has made it to a judges' decision.

== Background ==
Foster began his professional MMA career in 2006, after his brother died. In an interview with FightLockdown.com, Foster stated that "martial arts have changed me, it's made me a more humble and respectful individual. My brother’s death did make me a very angry person, so very shortly after it happened, I started training and used the physical stress of training to cancel out the emotional pain caused by his death. I like to think he is very proud of what I have accomplished since his passing [...] I take a photo of my brother with me to every fight."

== Mixed martial arts career ==
=== Early career ===
Foster got his start fighting for the Masters of the Cage company. Foster fought six times for the promotion and went 4–2 and won eight consecutive fights before losing to future The Ultimate Fighter winner, Diego Brandão. Foster bounced back and won his next three fights before getting signed by the Ultimate Fighting Championship.

=== Ultimate Fighting Championship ===
At UFC 103, Foster was set to make his debut against highly regarded Englishman, Paul Daley. Daley replaced Mike Swick in a fight with Martin Kampmann, leaving Foster without an opponent. Instead of Daley, he ended up fighting Rick Story and lost via arm-triangle choke submission in the second round.

At UFC 106 on November 21, 2009, Foster defeated Brock Larson by TKO in the second round after taking an illegal kick to the head and an illegal knee to the head in the first round.

Foster stepped in for an injured Dong Hyun Kim at UFC 110 to face Chris Lytle. He lost due to a kneebar submission in the first round.

Foster next faced Forrest Petz on September 15, 2010, at UFC Fight Night 22. He won in the first round by TKO.

Foster then faced Matt Brown at UFC 123, replacing an injured Rory MacDonald. Foster won the fight by guillotine choke submission in the second round.

In 2010, an inadvertent groin strike sustained during training burst Foster's testicle and it had to be surgically removed. Later, when he was cleared to continue training for upcoming Pierson fight at UFC 129, a pre-fight MRI showed clear signs of a brain hemorrhage. The second MRI taken of his brain showed no signs of hemorrhage. However, Foster was left without a fight and subsequently he was released from UFC. According to Foster, there was miscommunication in the media leading to reports of him going through a brain surgery but Foster stated they were false.

=== Post-UFC ===
Now fully recovered, Foster's next fight was against Jack Mason at Cage Warriors Fighting Championship 44. He won the fight by standing guillotine choke submission in the first round.

Foster defeated LaVerne Clark via first-round submission at Capital City Cage Wars 7 on October 15, 2011.

=== World Series of Fighting/Professional Fighters League ===
Foster joined the World Series of Fighting in 2014. In his first fight for the promotion, Foster faced Jake Shields in the main event of WSOF 17 on January 17, 2015. He lost the fight via submission in the first round.

In his second fight for the promotion, Foster defeated LaRue Burley via knockout with a right hook at 34 seconds of the first round at WSOF 23 on September 18, 2015.

Foster then entered WSOF's one night Lightweight tournament to determine the number one contender for the Lightweight Championship. He faced Joáo Zeferino in the quarter-finals and lost via submission due to a heel hook. However, a number of injuries plagued the semifinalists and Foster continued as an injury substitution. He faced Luis Palomino in the semifinals and won via TKO in the second round. In the finals, he faced Zeferino in a rematch and won the fight via knockout in the second round to win the tournament.

Foster faced Luiz Firmino at WSOF 33 on October 7, 2016. He won the fight via triangle choke submission in the first round.

Foster faced Jon Fitch in a welterweight title bout on June 30, 2017, at Professional Fighters League 36: Fitch vs. Foster. He lost the fight in the second round due to submission.

Foster faced Ramsey Nijem in the initial round of Professional Fighters League's lightweight tournament. Foster won the fight via ground and pound, stemming from a flying knee to Nijem's head.

== Kickboxing ==
Foster made his debut as a kickboxer and Glory fighter at GLORY 11 in Hoffman Estates, Illinois on October 12, 2013. He lost via TKO in the first round following a spinning heel kick from Raymond Daniels.

== Kickboxing record(incomplete) ==
Professional kickboxing record
3 wins (3 KOs), 1 losses, 0 draws
Date	Result	Opponent	Event	Location	Method	Round	Time	Record
2013-10-12	Loss	(United States) Raymond Daniels	Glory 11: Chicago	Hoffman Estates, Illinois, USA	TKO (right spinning heel kick)	1	2:24	0–1
Legend: Win Loss Draw/No contest Notes

== Championships and accomplishments ==
- Ultimate Fighting Championship
  - Fight of the Night (One time) vs. Rick Story
  - Knockout of the Night (One time) vs. Forrest Petz
  - UFC.com Awards
    - 2009: Ranked #7 Fight of the Year vs. Rick Story
- World Series of Fighting
  - WSOF Lightweight Tournament Winner
- Victory Fighting Championship
  - VFC Welterweight Championship (One time, current)

== Mixed martial arts record ==
Professional record breakdown
43 matches	30 wins	13 losses
By knockout	15	3
By submission	14	9
By decision	1	0
By disqualification	0	1

Res.	Record	Opponent	Method	Event	Date	Round	Time	Location	Notes
Loss	30–13	Evan Cutts	TKO (punches)	Peak Fighting 36	May 11, 2024	1	4:59	Dallas, Texas, United States	For the PF Welterweight Championship.
Win	30–12	Roderick Stewart	Submission (kimura)	Peak Fighting 33	January 6, 2024	2	2:07	Shawnee, Oklahoma, United States	Return to Welterweight.
Win	29–12	Cliff Wright	Submission (kimura)	MMAX FC 9: High Stakes 2	August 15, 2020	1	2:20	Poteau, Oklahoma, United States	
Loss	28–12	Amirkhan Adaev	DQ (Illegal Upkick)	ACA 101: Strus vs. Nemchinov	November 15, 2019	2	3:17	Warsaw, Poland	
Loss	28–11	Abdul-Aziz Abdulvakhabov	Submission (arm-triangle choke)	ACA 92: Yagshimuradov vs. Celiński	16 February 2019	1	1:38	Warsaw, Poland	
Win	28–10	Ramsey Nijem	TKO (knee and punches)	PFL 2 (2018)	June 21, 2018	3	0:32	Chicago, Illinois, United States	Return to Lightweight.
Loss	27–10	Jon Fitch	Submission (bulldog choke)	PFL: Daytona	June 30, 2017	2	3:12	Daytona Beach, Florida, United States	For the PFL Welterweight Championship.
Win	27–9	Luiz Firmino	Submission (triangle choke)	WSOF 33	October 7, 2016	1	3:14	Kansas City, Missouri, United States	
Loss	26–9	Justin Gaethje	TKO (leg kicks)	WSOF 29	March 12, 2016	1	1:43	Greeley, Colorado, United States	For the WSOF Lightweight Championship.
Win	26–8	João Zeferino	KO (punches)	WSOF 25	November 20, 2015	2	4:51	Phoenix, Arizona, United States	WSOF Lightweight Tournament Final.
Win	25–8	Luis Palomino	TKO (punches)	WSOF 25	November 20, 2015	2	4:19	Phoenix, Arizona, United States	WSOF Lightweight Tournament Semifinal.
Loss	24–8	João Zeferino	Submission (heel hook)	WSOF 25	November 20, 2015	1	1:46	Phoenix, Arizona, United States	WSOF Lightweight Tournament Quarterfinal.
Win	24–7	LaRue Burley	KO (punch)	WSOF 23	September 18, 2015	1	0:32	Phoenix, Arizona, United States	
Win	23–7	Marcio Navarro	TKO (knee and punches)	XFI 14	July 18, 2015	1	0:45	Fort Smith, Arkansas, United States	Lightweight debut.
Loss	22–7	Jake Shields	Submission (rear-naked choke)	WSOF 17	January 17, 2015	1	2:51	Las Vegas, Nevada, United States	
Win	22–6	Gilbert Smith	Decision (unanimous)	Titan FC 28: Brilz vs. Davis	May 16, 2014	3	5:00	Newkirk, Oklahoma, United States	
Win	21–6	Rodrigo Soria	Submission (armbar)	RDC MMA: Reto de Campeones 2	February 21, 2014	1	2:39	Mexico City, Mexico	
Win	20–6	Mitch Whitesel	Submission (armbar)	C3 Fights: Border Wars 2014	February 8, 2014	1	4:37	Newkirk, Oklahoma, United States	
Win	19–6	James Wood	KO (spinning back kick)	Victory Fighting Championship 40	July 27, 2013	2	0:43	Ralston, Nebraska, United States	Won the VFC Welterweight Championship.
Loss	18–6	Daniel Roberts	Submission (rear naked choke)	Combat MMA	May 18, 2013	1	1:29	Tulsa, Oklahoma, United States	
Win	18–5	LaVerne Clark	Submission (armbar)	Capital City Cage Wars 7	October 15, 2011	1	2:31	Springfield, Illinois, United States	
Win	17–5	Jack Mason	Submission (guillotine choke)	Cage Warriors: 44	October 1, 2011	1	2:15	Kentish Town, London, England	Catchweight (181 lbs) bout.
Win	16–5	Matt Brown	Submission (guillotine choke)	UFC 123	November 20, 2010	2	2:11	Auburn Hills, Michigan, United States	
Win	15–5	Forrest Petz	TKO (punches)	UFC Fight Night: Marquardt vs. Palhares	September 15, 2010	1	1:07	Austin, Texas, United States	Knockout of the Night.
Loss	14–5	Chris Lytle	Submission (kneebar)	UFC 110	February 21, 2010	1	1:41	Sydney, Australia	
Win	14–4	Brock Larson	TKO (submission to punches)	UFC 106	November 21, 2009	2	3:25	Las Vegas, Nevada, United States	
Loss	13–4	Rick Story	Submission (arm-triangle choke)	UFC 103	September 19, 2009	2	1:09	Dallas, Texas, United States	Fight of the Night.
Win	13–3	Kyle Baker	KO (punches)	Shine Fights 1: Genesis	April 9, 2009	1	0:59	Columbus, Ohio, United States	
Win	12–3	Mike Jackson	KO (punches)	PB MMA: Return to Glory	March 28, 2009	1	0:05	Fort Smith, Arkansas, United States	
Win	11–3	Nathan Coy	Submission (kimura)	Pro Battle MMA: Immediate Impact	October 4, 2008	1	4:08	Springdale, Arkansas, United States	
Loss	10–3	Diego Brandão	KO (punches)	TAP Entertainment: Fight Night	June 27, 2008	1	1:34	Sallisaw, Oklahoma, United States	
Win	10–2	Douglas Edwards	Submission (armbar)	LFC 1: The Genesis	May 10, 2008	1	2:00	Wichita, Kansas, United States	
Win	9–2	Nuri Shakir	Submission (guillotine choke)	AOW: Gi's vs Pro's	April 19, 2008	1	1:09	Tunica, Mississippi, United States	
Win	8–2	Ken Jackson	TKO (punches)	Warriors of the Cage 1	June 16, 2007	3	0:40	Oklahoma City, Oklahoma, United States	
Win	7–2	Phet Phongsavane	Submission (rear-naked choke)	Night of Champions: Power, Pride and Honor	March 30, 2007	1	N/A	Alexandria, Louisiana, United States	
Win	6–2	Derik Bolton	TKO (punches)	Blackeye Productions	February 10, 2007	1	1:30	Fort Smith, Arkansas, United States	
Win	5–2	Steve Carl	TKO (punches)	Masters of the Cage 7	December 2, 2006	1	4:34	Norman, Oklahoma, United States	
Win	4–2	James Inhoff	Submission	Blackeye Productions	November 4, 2006	1	2:25	Arkansas, United States	
Win	3–2	Jeff Davis	TKO (punches)	Masters of the Cage 5	October 14, 2006	1	2:44	Oklahoma City, Oklahoma, United States	
Loss	2–2	TJ Waldburger	Submission (armbar)	Masters of the Cage 4	September 23, 2006	1	0:29	Oklahoma City, Oklahoma, United States	
Win	2–1	Jeff Davis	Submission	Masters of the Cage 3	August 19, 2006	3	1:19	Oklahoma City, Oklahoma, United States	
Loss	1–1	Jeff Davis	Submission (choke)	Masters of the Cage 2	July 14, 2006	3	0:54	Oklahoma City, Oklahoma, United States	
Win	1–0	Deric Harris	KO (punch)	Masters of the Cage 2	July 14, 2006	1	1:09	Oklahoma City, Oklahoma, United States	
