= World Series of Fighting 24: Fitch vs. Okami =

World Series of Fighting MMA event in 2015

- Promotion: World Series of Fighting
- Date: October 17, 2015
- Venue: Foxwoods Resort Casino
- City: Mashantucket, Connecticut, United States
- Attendance: 2,876

Event chronology
World Series of Fighting 23: Gaethje vs. Palomino II	World Series of Fighting 24: Fitch vs. Okami	World Series of Fighting 25: Lightweight Tournament

World Series of Fighting 24: Fitch vs. Okami was a mixed martial arts event held October 17, 2015 in Mashantucket, Connecticut, United States. This event aired live on NBCSN in the U.S and on Fight Network in Canada.

== Background ==
The main event was a welterweight fight between UFC veterans Jon Fitch and Yushin Okami. The co-main event was a fight for the WSOF Heavyweight Championship between champion Blagoy Ivanov making his first defense of his title against challenger Derrick Mehmen.

== Results ==
Fight Card
Weight class				Method	Round	Time	Notes
Welterweight	Jon Fitch	def.	Yushin Okami	Decision (unanimous) (29–28, 30–27, 30–27)	3	5:00
Heavyweight	Blagoy Ivanov (c)	def.	Derrick Mehmen	TKO (punches)	2	4:33	(Note: For the WSOF Heavyweight Championship.)
Lightweight	Nick Newell	def.	Tom Marcellino	Decision (unanimous) (29–28, 29–28, 29–28)	3	5:00
Light Heavyweight	Vinny Magalhães	def.	Matt Hamill	Submission (kneebar)	1	1:08
Flyweight	Magomed Bibulatov	def.	Donavon Frelow	Decision (unanimous) (50–45, 50–45, 50–45)	5	5:00	(Note: For the inaugural WSOF Flyweight Championship.)
Preliminary Card (WSOF.com)
Featherweight	Rick Glenn	def.	Adam Ward	KO (punches)	2	1:27
Featherweight	Alexandre de Almeida	def.	Saul Almeida	Submission (rear-naked choke)	1	1:23
Welterweight	Colton Smith	def.	Washington Nunes da Silva	Decision (unanimous) (30–26, 30–26, 30–26)	3	5:00
Heavyweight	Patrick Walsh	def.	Tyler King	Decision (unanimous) (30–27, 30–27, 30–27)	3	5:00
Middleweight	Rex Harris	def.	Justin Torrey	Decision (split) (29–28, 28–29, 29–28)	3	5:00
Featherweight	Bruce Boyington	def.	Rodrigo Almeida	Decision (split) (29–28, 28–29, 29–28)	3	5:00

== See also ==
- World Series of Fighting
- List of WSOF champions
- List of WSOF events
