= List of Professional Fighters League champions =

Professional Fighters League ("PFL") is an American mixed martial arts promotion company, and the following is a history of its champions in each weight class. This list also includes championship histories for their international partners PFL Europe, PFL Africa and PFL MENA, as well as the championship histories for their predecessor World Series of Fighting ("WSOF") and its international partners WSOF: Canada and WSOF Global.

== Current champions ==
Men

Division	Champion	Since	Defenses
Heavyweight	(Russia) Sergey Bilostenniy	Nov 14, 2026	0
Light Heavyweight	(United States) Corey Anderson	Oct 3, 2025	0
Middleweight	(Spain) Costello van Steenis	Jul 19, 2025	1
Middleweight	(United States) Johnny Eblen (interim)	Jul 18, 2026	0
Welterweight	(United States) Thad Jean	Jul 25, 2026	0
Lightweight	(Russia) Usman Nurmagomedov	Oct 3, 2025	2
Featherweight	(Kyrgyzstan) Razhabali Shaydullaev	Sep 10, 2026	0
Bantamweight			

Women

Division	Champion	Since	Defenses
Featherweight	(Brazil) Cris Cyborg	Dec 13, 2025	1
Flyweight	(United States) Jena Bishop	Oct 16, 2026	0

== PFL championship history ==
=== Men's championship history ===
==== Heavyweight Championship ====
206 to 265 lb (93 to 120 kg)

No.	Name	Event	Date	Reign	Defenses
1	(Russia) Vadim Nemkov def. Renan Ferreira	PFL Lyon; Décines-Charpieu, France	Dec 13, 2025	336 days	
2	(Russia) Sergey Bilostenniy	PFL Dubai; Dubai, UAE	Nov 14, 2026	1 day (incumbent)	

==== Light Heavyweight Championship ====
186 to 205 lbs (84.3 to 93 kg)

No.	Name	Event	Date	Reign	Defenses
1	(United States) Corey Anderson def. Dovletdzhan Yagshimuradov	PFL Champions Series 3 Dubai, UAE	Oct 3, 2025	408 days (incumbent)	

==== Middleweight Championship ====
171 to 185 lbs (77 to 84 kg)

No.	Name	Event	Date	Reign	Defenses
1	(Spain) Costello van Steenis def. Johnny Eblen	PFL Champions Series 2 Cape Town, South Africa	Jul 19, 2025	484 days (incumbent)	1. def. Fabian Edwards at PFL Madrid on Mar 20, 2026
—	(United States) Johnny Eblen def. Impa Kasanganay for interim title	PFL Austin; Austin, TX, US	Jul 18, 2026	120 days (incumbent)	

==== Welterweight Championship ====
156 to 170 lbs (70 to 77 kg)

No.	Name	Event	Date	Reign	Defenses
1	(Russia) Ramazan Kuramagomedov def. Shamil Musaev	PFL Dubai; Dubai, UAE	Feb 7, 2026	95 days	
Kuramagomedov announced his retirement on February 7, 2026. The title was officially vacated on May 13, 2026.
2	(United States) Thad Jean def. Ernesto Rodriguez	PFL Washington DC; Washington D.C., US	Jul 25, 2026	113 days (incumbent)	

==== Lightweight Championship ====
146 to 155 lbs (66.2 to 70.3 kg)

No.	Name	Event	Date	Reign	Defenses
1	(Russia) Usman Nurmagomedov def. Paul Hughes	PFL Champions Series 3 Dubai, UAE	Oct 3, 2025	408 days (incumbent)	1. def. Alfie Davis at PFL Dubai on Feb 7, 2026; 2. def. Archie Colgan at PFL New York on Jul 31, 2026

==== Featherweight Championship ====
136 to 145 lbs (61 to 66 kg)

No.	Name	Event	Date	Reign	Defenses
1	(Kyrgyzstan) Razhabali Shaydullaev def. A. J. McKee	Super Rizin 5 Osaka, Japan	Sep 10, 2026	66 days (incumbent)	

=== Women's championship history ===
==== Women's Featherweight Championship ====
126 to 145 lbs (57 to 66 kg)

No.	Name	Event	Date	Reign	Defenses
1	(Brazil) Cris Cyborg def. Sara Collins	PFL Lyon; Décines-Charpieu, France	Dec 13, 2025	337 days (incumbent)	1. def. Ketlen Viera at PFL Tampa on Aug 23, 2026

==== Women's Flyweight Championship ====
116 to 125 lb (53 to 57 kg)

No.	Name	Event	Date	Reign	Defenses
1	(United States) Jena Bishop def. Liz Carmouche	PFL Chicago; Chicago, IL, US	Oct 16, 2026	29 days (incumbent)	

== PFL Tournament champions ==
=== World Tournament winners (defunct) ===
Event	Date	Division	Winner	Runner-up
PFL 11 (2018)	Dec 31, 2018	Heavyweight	(Brazil) Philipe Lins	(United States) Josh Copeland
PFL 11 (2018)	Dec 31, 2018	Light Heavyweight	(United States) Sean O'Connell	(Brazil) Vinny Magalhães
PFL 11 (2018)	Dec 31, 2018	Middleweight	(United States) Louis Taylor	(Germany) Abusupiyan Magomedov
PFL 11 (2018)	Dec 31, 2018	Welterweight	(Russia) Magomed Magomedkerimov	(United States) Ray Cooper III
PFL 11 (2018)	Dec 31, 2018	Lightweight	(Brazil) Natan Schulte	(Russia) Rashid Magomedov
PFL 11 (2018)	Dec 31, 2018	Featherweight	(United States) Lance Palmer	(United States) Steven Siler
PFL 10 (2019)	Dec 31, 2019	Heavyweight	(Russia) Ali Isaev	(United States) Jared Rosholt
PFL 10 (2019)	Dec 31, 2019	Light Heavyweight	(Argentina) Emiliano Sordi	(United States) Jordan Johnson
PFL 10 (2019)	Dec 31, 2019	Welterweight	(United States) Ray Cooper III	(United States) David Michaud
PFL 10 (2019)	Dec 31, 2019	Lightweight	(Brazil) Natan Schulte (2)	(Tajikistan) Loik Radzhabov
PFL 10 (2019)	Dec 31, 2019	Featherweight	(United States) Lance Palmer (2)	(United States) Alex Gilpin
PFL 10 (2019)	Dec 31, 2019	Women's Lightweight	(United States) Kayla Harrison	(Brazil) Larissa Pacheco
PFL 10 (2021)	Oct 27, 2021	Heavyweight	(Brazil) Bruno Cappelozza	(Croatia) Ante Delija
PFL 10 (2021)	Oct 27, 2021	Light Heavyweight	(Brazil) Antônio Carlos Júnior	(Norway) Marthin Hamlet
PFL 10 (2021)	Oct 27, 2021	Welterweight	(United States) Ray Cooper III (2)	(Russia) Magomed Magomedkerimov
PFL 10 (2021)	Oct 27, 2021	Lightweight	(Brazil) Raush Manfio	(Tajikistan) Loik Radzhabov
PFL 10 (2021)	Oct 27, 2021	Featherweight	(Russia) Movlid Khaybulaev	(United States) Chris Wade
PFL 10 (2021)	Oct 27, 2021	Women's Lightweight	(United States) Kayla Harrison (2)	(United States) Taylor Guardado
PFL 10 (2022)	Nov 25, 2022	Heavyweight	(Croatia) Ante Delija	(Brazil) Matheus Scheffel
PFL 10 (2022)	Nov 25, 2022	Light Heavyweight	(Australia) Rob Wilkinson	(Russia) Omari Akhmedov
PFL 10 (2022)	Nov 25, 2022	Welterweight	(Sweden) Sadibou Sy	(United States) Dilano Taylor
PFL 10 (2022)	Nov 25, 2022	Lightweight	(Canada) Olivier Aubin-Mercier	(Scotland) Stevie Ray
PFL 10 (2022)	Nov 25, 2022	Featherweight	(England) Brendan Loughnane	(United States) Bubba Jenkins
PFL 10 (2022)	Nov 25, 2022	Women's Lightweight	(Brazil) Larissa Pacheco	(United States) Kayla Harrison
PFL 10 (2023)	Nov 24, 2023	Heavyweight	(Brazil) Renan Ferreira	(Russia) Denis Goltsov
PFL 10 (2023)	Nov 24, 2023	Light Heavyweight	(United States) Impa Kasanganay	(United States) Josh Silveira
PFL 10 (2023)	Nov 24, 2023	Welterweight	(Russia) Magomed Magomedkerimov (2)	(Sweden) Sadibou Sy
PFL 10 (2023)	Nov 24, 2023	Lightweight	(Canada) Olivier Aubin-Mercier (2)	(United States) Clay Collard
PFL 10 (2023)	Nov 24, 2023	Featherweight	(Peru) Jesus Pinedo	(Brazil) Gabriel Alves Braga
PFL 10 (2023)	Nov 24, 2023	Women's Featherweight	(Brazil) Larissa Pacheco (2)	(Russia) Marina Mokhnatkina
PFL 10 (2024)	Nov 29, 2024	Heavyweight	(Russia) Denis Goltsov	(Russia) Oleg Popov
PFL 10 (2024)	Nov 29, 2024	Light Heavyweight	(Turkmenistan) Dovletdzhan Yagshimuradov	(United States) Impa Kasanganay
PFL 10 (2024)	Nov 29, 2024	Welterweight	(Russia) Shamil Musaev	(Russia) Magomed Umalatov
PFL 10 (2024)	Nov 29, 2024	Lightweight	(Russia) Gadzhi Rabadanov	(United States) Brent Primus
PFL 10 (2024)	Nov 29, 2024	Featherweight	(Russia) Timur Khizriev	(England) Brendan Loughnane
PFL 10 (2024)	Nov 29, 2024	Women's Flyweight	(England) Dakota Ditcheva	(Brazil) Taila Santos
PFL 8 (2025)	Aug 1, 2025	Welterweight	(United States) Thad Jean	(United States) Logan Storley
PFL 8 (2025)	Aug 1, 2025	Featherweight	N/A (Note: Movlid Khaybulaev tested positive for recombinant human erythropoietin (rHuEPO, a synthetic form of EPO) on December 18, 2025. The PFL stripped him of his Featherweight tournament win (the result of the bout was not affected).)	N/A (Note: Jesus Pinedo was the runner-up, however as his opponent was stripped of the tournament win, the title match status of his final was declared null and void.)
PFL 9 (2025)	Aug 15, 2025	Lightweight	(England) Alfie Davis	(Russia) Gadzhi Rabadanov
PFL 9 (2025)	Aug 15, 2025	Bantamweight	(Brazil) Marcirley Alves	(United States) Justin Wetzell
PFL 9 (2025)	Aug 15, 2025	Women's Flyweight	(United States) Liz Carmouche	(United States) Jena Bishop
PFL 10 (2025)	Aug 21, 2025	Heavyweight	(Russia) Oleg Popov	(Moldova) Alexander Romanov
PFL 10 (2025)	Aug 21, 2025	Light Heavyweight	(Brazil) Antônio Carlos Júnior (2)	(United States) Sullivan Cauley
PFL 10 (2025)	Aug 21, 2025	Middleweight	(England) Fabian Edwards	(United States) Dalton Rosta

=== European Championship Tournament winners (defunct) ===
Event	Date	Division	Winner	Runner-up
PFL Europe 4 (2023)	Dec 8, 2023	Light Heavyweight	(Slovenia) Jakob Nedoh	(England) Simeón Powell
PFL Europe 4 (2023)	Dec 8, 2023	Lightweight	(Poland) Jakub Kaszuba	(Republic of Ireland) John Mitchell
PFL Europe 4 (2023)	Dec 8, 2023	Bantamweight	(Germany) Khurshed Kakhorov	(South Africa) Frans Mlambo
PFL Europe 4 (2023)	Dec 8, 2023	Women's Flyweight	(England) Dakota Ditcheva	(Italy) Valentina Scatizzi
PFL Europe 4 (2024)	Dec 14, 2024	Welterweight	(Albania) Florim Zendeli	(Italy) Daniele Miceli
PFL Europe 4 (2024)	Dec 14, 2024	Lightweight	(Poland) Jakub Kaszuba (2)	(England) Connor Hughes
PFL Europe 4 (2024)	Dec 14, 2024	Bantamweight	(England) Lewis McGrillen-Evans	(Germany) Alexander Luster
PFL Europe 4 (2024)	Dec 14, 2024	Women's Flyweight	(Poland) Paulina Wiśniewska	(Italy) Valentina Scatizzi
PFL Champions Series 4	Dec 13, 2025	Lightweight	(Latvia) Aleksandr Chizov	(England) Connor Hughes
PFL Champions Series 4	Dec 13, 2025	Bantamweight	(France) Baris Adiguzel	(England) Dean Garnett

=== MENA Championship Tournament winners ===
Event	Date	Division	Winner	Runner-up
PFL 10 (2024)	Nov 29, 2024	Welterweight	(Egypt) Omar El Dafrawy	(Kuwait) Mohammad Alaqraa
PFL 10 (2024)	Nov 29, 2024	Lightweight	(Iran) Mohsen Mohammadseifi	(Lebanon) Georges Eid
PFL 10 (2024)	Nov 29, 2024	Featherweight	(Saudi Arabia) Abdullah Al-Qahtani	(Morocco) Maraoune Bellagouit
PFL 10 (2024)	Nov 29, 2024	Bantamweight	(Iraq) Ali Taleb	(Morocco) Rachid El Hazoume
PFL MENA 4 (2025)	Dec 5, 2025	Welterweight	(Kuwait) Mohammad Alaqraa	(Morocco) Badreddine Diani
PFL MENA 4 (2025)	Dec 5, 2025	Lightweight	(Morocco) Salah Eddine Hamli	(Iraq) Mohammad Fahmi
PFL MENA 4 (2025)	Dec 5, 2025	Featherweight	(Egypt) Islam Reda	(Algeria) Yanis Ghemmouri
PFL MENA 4 (2025)	Dec 5, 2025	Bantamweight	(Jordan) Nawras Abzakh	(Egypt) Islam Youssef

=== Africa Championship Tournament winners ===
Event	Date	Division	Winner	Runner-up
PFL Africa 4 (2025)	Dec 20, 2025	Heavyweight	(Ivory Coast) Abraham Bably	(South Africa) Justin Clarke
PFL Africa 4 (2025)	Dec 20, 2025	Welterweight	(Guinea-Bissau) Yabna N'Tchalá	(Angola) Shido Boris Esperanca
PFL Africa 4 (2025)	Dec 20, 2025	Featherweight	(Nigeria) Wasi Adeshina	(Cameroon) Alain Majorique
PFL Africa 4 (2025)	Dec 20, 2025	Bantamweight	(South Africa) Nkosi Ndebele	(Angola) Boule Godogo

== Symbolic Super Fights Champions (defunct) ==
=== Super Fights Heavyweight Championship ===
206 to 265 lbs (93 to 120 kg)

No.	Name	Event	Date	Reign	Defenses
1	(Cameroon) Francis Ngannou def. Renan Ferreira	PFL Super Fights: Battle of the Giants; Riyadh, Saudi Arabia	Oct 19, 2024	503 days	
Ngannou was released from PFL on March 6, 2026.

=== Super Fights Women's Featherweight Championship ===
126 to 145 lbs (57 to 66 kg)

No.	Name	Event	Date	Reign	Defenses
1	(Brazil) Cris Cyborg def. Larissa Pacheco	PFL Super Fights: Battle of the Giants; Riyadh, Saudi Arabia	Oct 19, 2024	757 days (incumbent)	

== WSOF champions (defunct) ==
All WSOF Championships were retired and vacated on June 7, 2018.

=== Heavyweight Championship ===
206 to 265 lbs (93 to 120 kg)

No.	Name	Event	Date	Reign	Defenses
1	(Canada) Smealinho Rama def. Derrick Mehmen	WSOF 14; Edmonton, AB, Canada	Oct 11, 2014	237 days	
2	(Bulgaria) Blagoy Ivanov	WSOF 21; Edmonton, AB, Canada	Jun 5, 2015	1055 days	1. def. Derrick Mehmen at WSOF 24 on Oct 17, 2015; 2. def. Josh Copeland at WSOF 31 on Jun 17, 2016; 3. def. Shawn Jordan at WSOF 35 on Mar 18, 2017; 4. def. Caio Alencar at PFL Fight Night on Nov 2, 2017
Ivanov vacated title on April 25, 2018, after becoming free agent and signing with the UFC.

=== Light Heavyweight Championship ===
186 to 205 lbs (84 to 93 kg)

No.	Name	Event	Date	Reign	Defenses
1	(United States) David Branch def. Teddy Holder	WSOF 23; Phoenix, AZ, U.S.	Sep 18, 2015	507 days	1. def. Vinny Magalhães at WSOF 33 on Oct 7, 2016
Branch vacated title on February 6, 2017, after becoming free agent and signing with the UFC.

=== Middleweight Championship ===
171 to 185 lbs (77 to 84 kg)

No.	Name	Event	Date	Reign	Defenses
1	(United States) David Branch def. Jesse Taylor	WSOF 10; Las Vegas, NV, U.S.	June 21, 2014	961 days	1. def. Yushin Okami at WSOF 15 on Nov 15, 2014; 2. def. Clifford Starks at WSOF 30 on Apr 2, 2016; 3. def. Louis Taylor at WSOF 34 on Dec 31, 2016
Branch vacated title on February 6, 2017, after becoming free agent and signing with the UFC.

=== Welterweight Championship ===
156 to 170 lbs (70 to 77 kg)

No.	Name	Event	Date	Reign	Defenses
1	(United States) Steve Carl def. Josh Burkman	WSOF 6 Coral Gables, FL, U.S.	Oct 26, 2013	154 days	
2	(Brazil) Rousimar Palhares	WSOF 9 Las Vegas, NV, U.S.	Mar 29, 2014	492 days	1. def. Jon Fitch at WSOF 16 on Dec 13, 2014; 2. def. Jake Shields at WSOF 22 on Aug 1, 2015
Palhares was stripped of the title on August 3, 2015.
3	(United States) Jon Fitch def. João Zeferino	WSOF 30; Las Vegas, NV, U.S.	Apr 2, 2016	698 days	1. def. Jake Shields at WSOF 34 on Dec 31, 2016; 2. def. Brian Foster at PFL Daytona on Jun 30, 2017
Fitch vacated title on March 1, 2018, after signing with Bellator.

=== Lightweight Championship ===
146 to 155 lbs (66 to 70 kg)

No.	Name	Event	Date	Reign	Defenses
1	(United States) Justin Gaethje def. Richard Patishnock	WSOF 8 Hollywood, FL, U.S.	Jan 18, 2014	1196 days	1. def. Nick Newell at WSOF 11 on July 5, 2014; 2. def. Luis Palomino at WSOF 19 on Mar 28, 2015; 3. def. Luis Palomino at WSOF 23 on Sep 18, 2015; 4. def. Brian Foster at WSOF 29 on Mar 12, 2016; 5. def. Luiz Firmino at WSOF 34 on Dec 31, 2016
Gaethje vacated title on April 27, 2017, after signing with the UFC.

=== Featherweight Championship ===
136 to 145 lbs (61 to 66 kg)

No.	Name	Event	Date	Reign	Defenses
1	(Armenia) Georgi Karakhanyan def. Lance Palmer	WSOF 7 Vancouver, BC, Canada	Dec 7, 2013	196 days	
2	(United States) Ricky Glenn	WSOF 10; Las Vegas, NV, U.S.	Jun 21, 2014	176 days	
3	(United States) Lance Palmer	WSOF 16; Sacramento, CA, U.S.	Dec 13, 2014	371 days	1. def. Chris Horodecki at WSOF 21 on June 5, 2015
4	(Brazil) Alexandre Almeida	WSOF 26; Las Vegas, NV, U.S.	Dec 18, 2015	226 days	
5	(United States) Lance Palmer (2)	WSOF 32; Everett, WA, U.S.	Jul 30, 2016	231 days (602 days)	
6	(United States) Andre Harrison	WSOF 35; Verona, NY, U.S.	Mar 18, 2017	446 days	1. def. Steven Rodriguez at PFL Everett on Jul 29, 2017
The WSOF Featherweight championship was retired on June 7, 2018 when the PFL league format began at PFL 1.

=== Bantamweight Championship ===
126 to 135 lbs (57 to 61 kg)

No.	Name	Event	Date	Reign	Defenses
1	(Brazil) Marlon Moraes def. Josh Rettinghouse	WSOF 9 Las Vegas, NV, USA	March 29, 2014	1,011 days	1. def. Josh Hill at WSOF 18 on Feb 12, 2015; 2. def. Sheymon Moraes at WSOF 22 on Aug 1, 2015; 3. def. Joseph Barajas at WSOF 28 on Feb 20, 2016; 4. def. Josh Hill at WSOF 32 on Jul 30, 2016; 5. def. Josenaldo Silva at WSOF 34 on Dec 31, 2016
Moraes vacated title on January 3, 2017, after becoming a free agent and signing with the UFC.
2	(Russia) Bekbulat Magomedov def. Donavon Frelow	WSOF 35; Verona, NY, USA	March 18, 2017	446 days	
The WSOF Bantamweight championship was retired on June 7, 2018 when the PFL league format began at PFL 1.

=== Flyweight Championship ===
116 to 125 lbs (53 to 57 kg)

No.	Name	Event	Date	Reign	Defenses
1	(Russia) Magomed Bibulatov def. Donavon Frelow	WSOF 24; Mashantucket, CT, USA	October 17, 2015	446 days	
Bibulatov vacated title on January 5, 2017, after joining the UFC.

=== Women's Championship History (defunct) ===
All WSOF Championships were retired and vacated on June 7, 2018.

==== Women's Strawweight Championship ====
106 to 115 lb (48 to 52 kg)

No.	Name	Event	Date	Reign	Defenses
1	(Mexico) Jessica Aguilar def. Alida Gray	WSOF 8 Hollywood, FL, USA	January 18, 2014	484 days	1. def. Emi Fujino at WSOF 10 on June 21, 2014; 2. def. Kalindra Faria at WSOF 15 on Nov 15, 2014
Aguilar vacated title on May 18, 2015, after joining the UFC.

=== International Championship History (defunct) ===
All WSOF International Championships were retired and vacated on June 7, 2018.

==== Canadian Welterweight Championship ====
156 to 170 lbs (70 to 77 kg)

No.	Name	Event	Date	Reign	Defenses
1	(Canada) Ryan Ford def. Joel Powell	WSOF Canada 1 Edmonton, AB, Canada	February 21, 2014	472 days	
Ford vacated title on June 8, 2015, after retiring from the sport of MMA.

==== Global Heavyweight Championship ====
206 to 265 lbs (93 to 120 kg)

No.	Name	Event	Date	Reign	Defenses
1	(Russia) Evgeny Erokhin def. Brandon Cash	WSOF Global Championship 2: Japan; Tokyo, Japan	February 7, 2016	851 days	1. def. Richard Odoms at WSOF Global Championship 3: Philippines
All WSOF International championships were retired and vacated on June 7, 2018 when the PFL league format began at PFL 1.

==== Global Flyweight Championship ====
125 lbs (57 kg)

No.	Name	Event	Date	Reign	Defenses
1	(Japan) Yusaku Nakamura def. Lawrence Diguilio	Deep Cage Impact 2016: DEEP vs. WSOF-GC; Tokyo, Japan	December 17, 2016	537 days	
All WSOF International championships were retired and vacated on June 7, 2018 when the PFL league format began at PFL 1.

=== Tournament winners ===
Event(s)	Division	Champion	Runner-up	Final
WSOF 5, WSOF 7 e WSOF 10	Middleweight	(United States) David Branch	(United States) Jesse Taylor	June 21, 2014
WSOF 19, WSOF 20 e WSOF 23	Light Heavyweight	(United States) David Branch	(United States) Teddy Holder	September 18, 2015
WSOF 25	Lightweight	(United States) Brian Foster	(Brazil) João Zeferino	November 20, 2015

== Records ==
=== Most wins in title bouts ===
The following includes all fighters with three or more championship and/or interim championship title fights. Fighters with the same number of title wins are arranged in order of most title bouts. Tournament championships are not included.

Title wins	Champion	Weight class	W	D	NC	L
6	(United States) Justin Gaethje	Lightweight	6	0	0	0
6	(Brazil) Marlon Moraes	Bantamweight	6	0	0	0
6	(United States) David Branch	Light Heavyweight; Middleweight	2; 4	0; 0	0; 0	0; 0
5	(Bulgaria) Blagoy Ivanov	Heavyweight	5	0	0	0
3	(United States) Lance Palmer	Featherweight	3	0	0	3
3	(Mexico) Jessica Aguilar	Women's Strawweight	3	0	0	0
3	(Brazil) Rousimar Palhares	Welterweight	3	0	0	0
3	(Russia) Usman Nurmagomedov	Lightweight	3	0	0	0

=== Most consecutive title defenses ===
The following includes all PFL / WSOF champions who were able to consecutively defend their title two times or more. Fighters with the same number of title defenses are listed chronologically.

Defenses	Champion	Weight class	Span
5	(United States) Justin Gaethje	Lightweight	January 18, 2014 - April 27, 2017
5	(Brazil) Marlon Moraes	Bantamweight	March 29, 2014 - January 3, 2017
4	(Bulgaria) Blagoy Ivanov	Heavyweight	June 5, 2015 - April 25, 2018
3	(United States) David Branch	Middleweight	June 21, 2014 - February 6, 2017
2	(Mexico) Jessica Aguilar	Women's Strawweight	January 18, 2014 - May 18, 2015
2	(Brazil) Rousimar Palhares	Welterweight	March 29, 2014 - August 4, 2015
2	(Russia) Usman Nurmagomedov	Lightweight	October 3, 2025 - Present

=== Multi-division champions ===
Interim title

Fighters who have won championships in multiple weight classes. Tournament champions are not included.

No.	Champion	Division	Won	Lost	Defenses	Reign	Total Reign
1	(United States) David Branch	Light Heavyweight	September 18, 2015 (WSOF 23)	February 6, 2017 (Vacated)	1	507 days	1468 days
1	(United States) David Branch	Middleweight	June 21, 2014 (WSOF 10)	February 6, 2017 (Vacated)	3	961 days	1468 days

=== Simultaneous two division champions ===
This table, different from the previous one, only counts the periods in which the fighter loaded the titles simultaneously and the defenses in that period of time.

No.	Champion	Division	Span	Defenses	Simultaneous Reign
1	(United States) David Branch	Light Heavyweight	September 18, 2015 – February 6, 2017	1	507 days
1	(United States) David Branch	Middleweight	September 18, 2015 – February 6, 2017	2	507 days

== Champions by nationality ==
Fighters with multiple title reigns in a specific division will be counted once in the Division champions. Interim champions who have never become linear champions will be listed as interim champions.

Country	Division champions	Tournament champions	International champions	Super Fights champions	Total
United States	12	8	-	-	20
Russia	6	8	1	-	15
Brazil	4	6	-	1	11
Canada	-	1	1	-	2
Bulgaria	1	-	-	-	1
Spain	1	-	-	-	1
Greece	1	-	-	-	1
Mexico	1	-	-	-	1
Kyrgyzstan	1	-	-	-	1
Cameroon	-	-	-	1	1
Argentina	-	1	-	-	1
Japan	-	-	1	-	1

== See also ==
- List of PFL events
- List of current PFL fighters
- List of current mixed martial arts champions
- List of Bellator MMA champions
- List of EliteXC champions
- List of Invicta FC champions
- List of ONE Championship champions
- List of Pride champions
- List of Strikeforce champions
- List of UFC champions
- List of WEC champions
- Mixed martial arts weight classes
