= World Series of Fighting 18: Moraes vs. Hill =

World Series of Fighting mixed martial arts event in 2015

- Promotion: World Series of Fighting
- Date: February 12, 2015
- Venue: Edmonton Expo Centre
- City: Edmonton, Alberta, Canada
- Attendance: 5,026

Event chronology
World Series of Fighting 17: Shields vs. Foster	World Series of Fighting 18: Moraes vs. Hill	World Series of Fighting 19: Gaethje vs. Palomino

World Series of Fighting 18: Moraes vs. Hill was a mixed martial arts event held February 12, 2015, in Edmonton, Alberta, Canada. This event aired on NBCSN in the U.S and on TSN2 in Canada.

== Background ==
Moraes was scheduled to defend his title against Josh Hill on September 13, 2014 at World Series of Fighting 13 but was rescheduled for this event. The main event was a fight for the WSOF Bantamweight Championship between champion Marlon Moraes and challenger Josh Hill.

== Results ==
Main card
Weight class				Method	Round	Time	Notes
Bantamweight	Marlon Moraes (c)	def.	Josh Hill	Decision (unanimous) (49–46, 49–46, 49–46)	5	5:00	(Note: For the WSOF Bantamweight Championship.)
Welterweight	Shane Campbell	def.	Derek Boyle	TKO (body kick and punches)	3	0:31
Welterweight	Andrew McInnes	def.	Cody McKenzie	DQ (intentional headbutt)	1	4:57
Featherweight	Hakeem Dawodu	def.	Tristan Johnson	TKO (punches)	3	1:59
Preliminary card
Middleweight	Matt Baker	vs.	Ali Mokdad	No Contest (accidental clash of heads)	1	0:13
Middleweight	Marcus Hicks	def.	Graham Park	Submission (rear-naked choke)	1	2:28
Unaired preliminary card
Welterweight	Mark Drummond	def.	Spencer Jebb	KO (knee)	3	2:43
Lightweight	Dan Lariviere	def.	Garret Nybakken	Submission (rear-naked choke)	1	4:40

== See also ==
- World Series of Fighting
- List of WSOF champions
- List of WSOF events
