= Marlon Moraes =

Brazilian mixed martial arts fighter

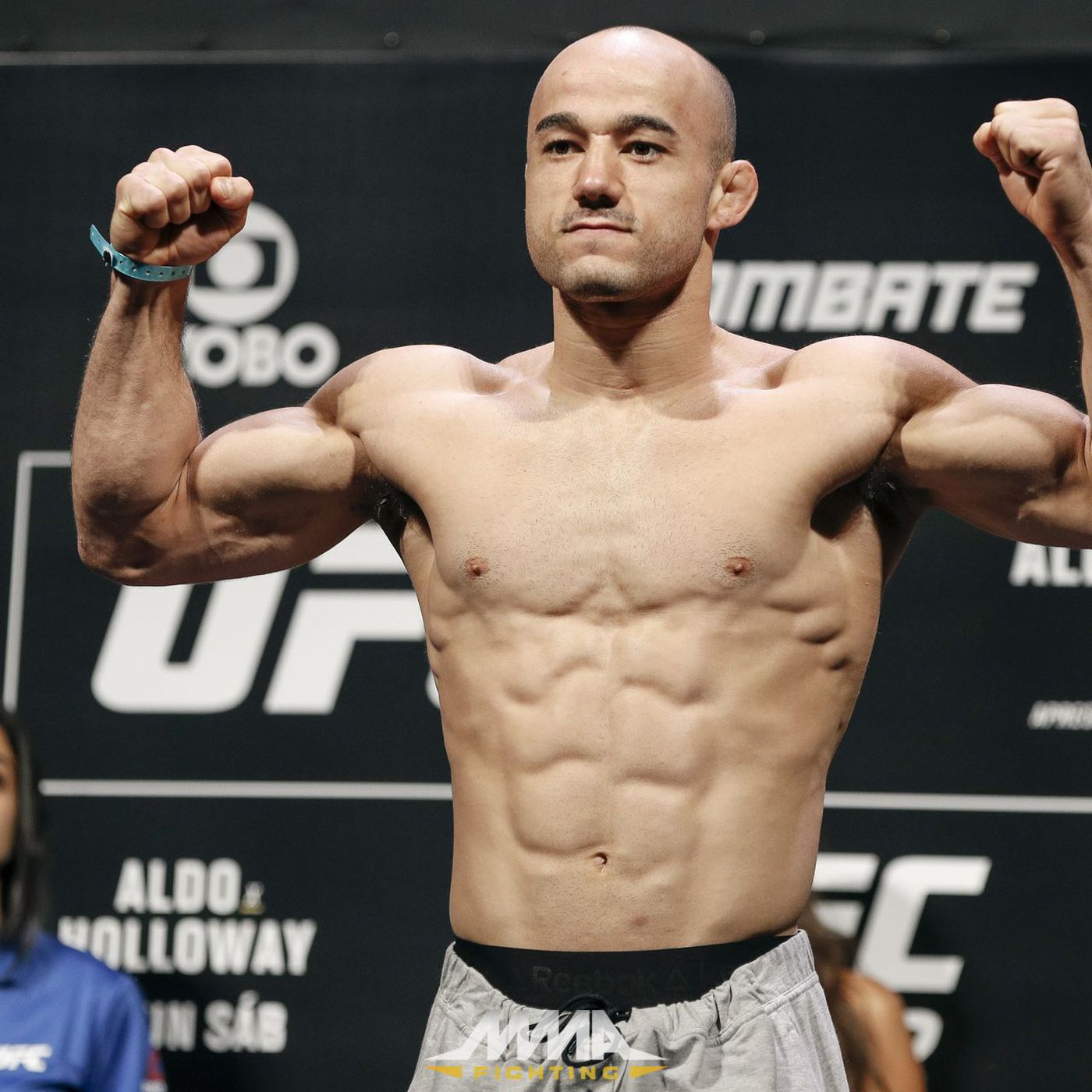
- Moraes in 2017
- Born: April 26, 1988 (age 38); Nova Friburgo, Brazil
- Other names: Magic
- Height: 5 ft 6 in (168 cm)
- Weight: 145 lb (66 kg; 10 st 5 lb)
- Division: Bantamweight (2012–2022); Featherweight (2007–2012) (2022–2023)
- Reach: 67 in (170 cm)
- Fighting out of: Toms River, New Jersey, United States
- Team: American Top Team
- Rank: Black belt in Muay Thai; Black belt in Brazilian Jiu-Jitsu under Ricardo Almeida
- Years active: 2007–2023

Mixed martial arts record
- Total: 38
- Wins: 24
- By knockout: 10
- By submission: 6
- By decision: 8
- Losses: 13
- By knockout: 10
- By submission: 2
- By decision: 1
- Draws: 1

Other information
- Mixed martial arts record from Sherdog

Marlon Moraes (born April 26, 1988) is a Brazilian former professional mixed martial artist who last competed in the Featherweight division of the Professional Fighters League (PFL). He previously competed in the bantamweight division of the Ultimate Fighting Championship (UFC) and World Series of Fighting (WSOF), the original incarnation of the PFL. He was the former and inaugural WSOF Bantamweight Champion.

== Early career ==
Moraes got his start in martial arts with Muay Thai at age seven and began training in Brazilian Jiu-Jitsu at age 15. He saw national success in Muay Thai in his native Brazil, earning a pair of Muay Thai National Championships before switching full-time to MMA.

== Mixed martial arts career ==
=== Xtreme Fighting Championships ===
On December 2, 2011, Moraes fought Chris Manuel at XFC 15, winning via unanimous decision.

On April 13, 2012, Moraes fought Jarrod Card at XFC 17, He won via knock out in 47 seconds of round one.

=== World Series of Fighting ===
In September 2012, Moraes signed with the World Series of Fighting.

On November 3, 2012, Moraes made his promotional debut against former WEC Bantamweight Champion Miguel Torres at WSOF 1. Moraes defeated Torres via split decision.

Following Moraes's victory over Torres, it was announced that at WSOF 2 Moraes would face Tyson Nam. On March 23, 2013, Moraes defeated Nam via knockout due to a head kick and punches in the first round.

Moraes faced Brandon Hempleman at WSOF 4 on August 10, 2013. Moraes won via unanimous decision.

Moraes fought Carson Beebe at WSOF 6 on October 26, 2013. He won via knockout due to punches in just thirty two seconds of round one.

Moraes fought for the inaugural WSOF Bantamweight Championship against Josh Rettinghouse at WSOF 9. He won via unanimous decision to become the first ever WSOF Bantamweight Champion.

Moraes was scheduled to defend his title against Josh Hill on September 13, 2014, at World Series of Fighting 13. However, Hill was injured and replaced by Cody Bollinger, with the bout being changed to a non-title, catchweight affair. Moraes won the fight via rear-naked choke submission in the second round.

Moraes was once again scheduled to defend his WSOF Bantamweight Championship against Josh Hill. The rescheduled fight took place on February 12, 2015, at WSOF 18 in Edmonton, Alberta. Moraes won via unanimous decision to retain his WSOF Bantamweight Championship.

Moraes faced Sheymon Moraes on August 1, 2015, at WSOF 22. Marlon Moraes won via rear naked choke submission in the third round to retain his WSOF Bantamweight Championship.

On February 20, 2016, Moraes faced Joseph Barajas at WSOF 28. Moraes won via technical knockout due to leg kicks in the first round to retain his WSOF Bantamweight Championship.

On May 10, 2016, it was announced that Moraes will rematch against Josh Hill for the WSOF Bantamweight Championship at WSOF 32 on July 30, 2016, in the main event. Moraes won the fight via knockout in the second round.

Moraes defended his title against Josenaldo Silva at WSOF 34 on December 31, 2016. He won the fight via technical knockout due to Silva receiving a knee injury.

On January 3, 2017, Moraes vacated the WSOF Bantamweight Championship after becoming an unrestricted free agent.

=== Ultimate Fighting Championship ===
In April 2017, it was announced that Moraes had signed with the UFC.

He made his promotional debut against Raphael Assunção at UFC 212 on June 3, 2017. He lost the back-and-forth fight via split decision.

Moraes faced John Dodson on November 11, 2017, at UFC Fight Night 120. He won the back-and-forth fight by split decision.

Moraes made a quick return to the Octagon as he stepped in to replace Rani Yahya against Aljamain Sterling at UFC Fight Night: Swanson vs. Ortega on December 9, 2017. He won the fight via knockout in the first round. The win also earned Moraes his first Performance of the Night bonus award.

After UFC Fight Night 123 in Fresno, the California State Athletic Commission (CSAC) flagged Moraes for gaining more than 10% of his weight back after weigh-ins. His jump from 135.4 pounds on weigh-in day to 155 pounds on fight day was a difference of 14.5%, well over commission regulations of staying within 10% of the contracted weight. CSAC will not license him for bantamweight bouts “without extensive medical documentation from a licensed physician certifying the weight class is appropriate and verified by CSAC physicians.”

Moraes faced Jimmie Rivera on June 1, 2018, at UFC Fight Night 131. Moraes won the fight via first-round knockout due to a head kick and punches in just 33 seconds, becoming the first fighter to finish Rivera in MMA, and snapping Rivera's 20-fight win streak. This win earned him a $50,000 Performance of the Night bonus.

Moraes faced Raphael Assunção in a rematch on February 2, 2019, in the main event at UFC Fight Night 144. Their first fight ended in a split decision loss for Moraes at UFC 212 on June 3, 2017. Moraes won the rematch in the first round by first dropping Assunção with two punches and then securing a guillotine choke submission. This win earned him the Performance of the Night award.

Moraes faced Henry Cejudo on June 8, 2019, at UFC 238 for the vacant UFC Bantamweight Championship. He lost the fight via technical knockout in round three.

Moraes faced former UFC Featherweight Champion José Aldo at UFC 245 on December 14, 2019. He won the fight via split decision. 9 out of 18 media outlets scored the bout for both Aldo and Moraes.

Moraes faced Cory Sandhagen on October 11, 2020 at UFC Fight Night 179. He lost the fight via technical knockout in round two.

Moraes faced Rob Font on December 19, 2020, at UFC Fight Night 183. He lost the fight via technical knockout in round one.

Moraes faced Merab Dvalishvili on September 25, 2021, at UFC 266. Despite knocking Dvalishvili down twice and nearly finishing him in the first round, Moraes ultimately fatigued and lost the fight via second-round TKO.

Moraes faced Song Yadong on March 12, 2022, at UFC Fight Night 203. He lost the bout via punches in round one.

On April 13, 2022, Marlon announced his retirement from MMA via his manager, Ali Abdelaziz. He stated that he wanted to “thank everyone- Sean Shelby, Dana White and the UFC for giving him the opportunity”.

=== Professional Fighters League ===
Less than 6 months after announcing his retirement, Moraes announced that he would be signing with the PFL for the 2023 Featherweight tournament.

Moraes was scheduled to face Shane Burgos in his PFL debut on November 25, 2022, at PFL 10. However, Burgos withdrew from the bout due to an injury. He was replaced by Sheymon Moraes. He lost the bout in the third round via TKO stoppage.

Moraes started the 2023 season against Brendan Loughnane on April 1, 2023, at PFL 1. He lost the bout in the second round, after a barrage of leg kicks left him unable to continue to fight.

Moraes was scheduled to face Alejandro Flores on June 8, 2023, at PFL 4. After Flores had failed a commission drug test and was pulled from the season, he was replaced by Gabriel Braga. Moraes lost the bout via technical knockout in the first round. He announced his retirement during the post-fight interview.

=== Retirement and law enforcement career ===
After announcing his retirement on June 8, 2023, after his knockout loss against Gabriel Braga, Moraes transitioned into a career in law enforcement. In May 2024, Moraes was sworn in as a police officer in Davie, Florida.

==== Global Fight League ====
On December 11, 2024, it was announced that Moraes was signed by Global Fight League.

Moraes was scheduled to come out of retirement to face former UFC Flyweight Championship challenger Ray Borg in the inaugural Global Fight League event on May 24, 2025, at GFL 1. However, all GFL events were cancelled indefinitely.

== Post-MMA retired life ==
It has been revealed that since retiring, Moraes has been recruited by the Coral Springs Police Department and the Davie Police Department being sworn in on 2024; the year after retiring from professional fighting. As a police officer, he has been assigned to patrol South Florida.

On September 5, 2026 a viral police bodycam showing officer Moraes taking down & “pummeling” a non-compliant motorist during a traffic stop began circulating around the internet.

== Championships and accomplishments ==
- Ultimate Fighting Championship
  - Performance of the Night (Three times) vs. Aljamain Sterling, Jimmie Rivera, and Raphael Assunção 2
  - UFC Honors Awards
    - 2019: President's Choice Fight of the Year Nominee vs. Henry Cejudo & Fan's Choice Submission of the Year Nominee vs. Raphael Assunção 2
  - UFC.com Awards
    - 2017: Ranked #4 Newcomer of the Year & Ranked #5 Knockout of the Year vs. Aljamain Sterling
    - 2019: Ranked #4 Submission of the Year vs. Raphael Assunção 2 & Ranked #6 Fight of the Year vs. Henry Cejudo
- World Series of Fighting
  - WSOF Bantamweight Championship (One time, first)
  - Most consecutive title defenses (5)
  - Most wins in title bouts (6)
  - Most wins (11)
  - Undefeated (11–0)
- MMA Junkie
  - 2019 June Fight of the Month vs. Henry Cejudo
- CBS Sports
  - 2017 #3 Ranked UFC Knockout of the Year vs. Aljamain Sterling

== Mixed martial arts record ==
Professional record breakdown
38 matches	24 wins	13 losses
By knockout	10	10
By submission	6	2
By decision	8	1
Draws	1	

Res.	Record	Opponent	Method	Event	Date	Round	Time	Location	Notes
Win	24–13–1	Maximiliano Perez	Decision (unanimous)	Liga Monstro Combate 2	August 28, 2026	3	5:00	São Paulo, Brazil	Catchweight (139 lb) bout.
Loss	23–13–1	Gabriel Braga	TKO (punches)	PFL 4 (2023)	June 8, 2023	1	3:02	Atlanta, Georgia, United States	
Loss	23–12–1	Brendan Loughnane	TKO (leg kicks)	PFL 1 (2023)	April 1, 2023	2	1:11	Las Vegas, Nevada, United States	
Loss	23–11–1	Sheymon Moraes	TKO (punches)	PFL 10 (2022)	November 25, 2022	3	0:58	New York City, New York, United States	Return to Featherweight.
Loss	23–10–1	Song Yadong	KO (punches)	UFC Fight Night: Santos vs. Ankalaev	March 12, 2022	1	2:06	Las Vegas, Nevada, United States	
Loss	23–9–1	Merab Dvalishvili	TKO (punches)	UFC 266	September 25, 2021	2	4:25	Las Vegas, Nevada, United States	
Loss	23–8–1	Rob Font	TKO (elbow and punches)	UFC Fight Night: Thompson vs. Neal	December 19, 2020	1	3:47	Las Vegas, Nevada, United States	
Loss	23–7–1	Cory Sandhagen	TKO (spinning wheel kick and punches)	UFC Fight Night: Moraes vs. Sandhagen	October 10, 2020	2	1:03	Abu Dhabi, United Arab Emirates	
Win	23–6–1	José Aldo	Decision (split)	UFC 245	December 14, 2019	3	5:00	Las Vegas, Nevada, United States	
Loss	22–6–1	Henry Cejudo	TKO (punches)	UFC 238	June 8, 2019	3	4:51	Chicago, Illinois, United States	For the vacant UFC Bantamweight Championship.
Win	22–5–1	Raphael Assunção	Submission (guillotine choke)	UFC Fight Night: Assunção vs. Moraes 2	February 2, 2019	1	3:17	Fortaleza, Brazil	Performance of the Night.
Win	21–5–1	Jimmie Rivera	KO (head kick and punches)	UFC Fight Night: Rivera vs. Moraes	June 1, 2018	1	0:33	Utica, New York, United States	Performance of the Night.
Win	20–5–1	Aljamain Sterling	KO (knee)	UFC Fight Night: Swanson vs. Ortega	December 9, 2017	1	1:07	Fresno, California, United States	Performance of the Night.
Win	19–5–1	John Dodson	Decision (split)	UFC Fight Night: Poirier vs. Pettis	November 11, 2017	3	5:00	Norfolk, Virginia, United States	
Loss	18–5–1	Raphael Assunção	Decision (split)	UFC 212	June 3, 2017	3	5:00	Rio de Janeiro, Brazil	
Win	18–4–1	Josenaldo Silva	TKO (knee injury)	WSOF 34	December 31, 2016	1	2:30	New York City, New York, United States	Defended the WSOF Bantamweight Championship.
Win	17–4–1	Josh Hill	KO (head kick and punches)	WSOF 32	July 30, 2016	2	0:38	Everett, Washington, United States	Defended the WSOF Bantamweight Championship
Win	16–4–1	Joseph Barajas	TKO (leg kicks)	WSOF 28	February 20, 2016	1	1:13	Garden Grove, California, United States	Defended the WSOF Bantamweight Championship.
Win	15–4–1	Sheymon Moraes	Submission (rear-naked choke)	WSOF 22	August 1, 2015	3	3:46	Las Vegas, Nevada, United States	Defended the WSOF Bantamweight Championship.
Win	14–4–1	Josh Hill	Decision (unanimous)	WSOF 18	February 12, 2015	5	5:00	Edmonton, Alberta, Canada	Defended the WSOF Bantamweight Championship.
Win	13–4–1	Cody Bollinger	Submission (rear-naked choke)	WSOF 13	September 13, 2014	2	1:35	Bethlehem, Pennsylvania, United States	Catchweight (140 lb) bout; Bollinger missed weight (147 lb).
Win	12–4–1	Josh Rettinghouse	Decision (unanimous)	WSOF 9	March 29, 2014	5	5:00	Las Vegas, Nevada, United States	Won the inaugural WSOF Bantamweight Championship.
Win	11–4–1	Carson Beebe	KO (punches)	WSOF 6	October 26, 2013	1	0:32	Coral Gables, Florida, United States	
Win	10–4–1	Brandon Hempleman	Decision (unanimous)	WSOF 4	August 10, 2013	3	5:00	Ontario, California, United States	
Win	9–4–1	Tyson Nam	KO (head kick and punches)	WSOF 2	March 23, 2013	1	2:55	Atlantic City, New Jersey, United States	
Win	8–4–1	Miguel Torres	Decision (split)	WSOF 1	November 12, 2012	3	5:00	Las Vegas, Nevada, United States	
Win	7–4–1	Jarrod Card	KO (punch)	XFC 17: Apocalypse	April 13, 2012	1	0:47	Jackson, Tennessee, United States	Bantamweight debut.
Win	6–4–1	Chris Manuel	Decision (unanimous)	XFC 15: Tribute	December 2, 2011	3	5:00	Tampa, Florida, United States	
Loss	5–4–1	Deividas Taurosevičius	Submission (arm-triangle choke)	Ring of Combat 38	November 18, 2011	1	2:34	Atlantic City, New Jersey, United States	For the ROC Featherweight Championship.
Loss	5–3–1	Ralph Acosta	Submission (rear-naked choke)	World Extreme Fighting 46	April 22, 2011	2	3:03	Orlando, Florida, United States	
Win	5–2–1	Ryan Bixler	Submission (Americana)	RMMA 20: Clash at the Casino	April 8, 2011	1	1:44	New Orleans, Louisiana, United States	
Win	4–2–1	Nicolas Joannes	Submission (rear-naked choke)	Shoot & Sprawl 2	October 2, 2010	1	3:49	Northamptonshire, England	
Draw	3–2–1	Sandro China	Draw (unanimous)	Dojo Combat 1	April 17, 2010	3	5:00	Juiz de Fora, Brazil	
Win	3–2	André Rouberte	TKO (punches)	Shooto: Brazil 10	January 17, 2009	1	3:35	Rio de Janeiro, Brazil	
Loss	2–2	Zeilton Rodrigues	TKO (punches)	Shooto: Brazil 7	June 28, 2008	1	1:45	Rio de Janeiro, Brazil	
Loss	2–1	Alexandre Pinheiro	TKO (punches)	Shooto: Brazil 6	April 18, 2008	1	2:58	Rio de Janeiro, Brazil	
Win	2–0	José Lucas de Melo	TKO (punches)	MMA Sports Combat 2	March 15, 2008	1	N/A	Rio das Ostras, Brazil	
Win	1–0	Bruno Santana	Submission (rear-naked choke)	Desafio: Brazil Fight Center 2	April 14, 2007	1	N/A	Rio de Janeiro, Brazil	

== Pay-per-view bouts ==
No	Event	Fight	Date	Venue	City	PPV buys
1.	UFC 238	Cejudo vs. Moraes	June 8, 2019	United Center	Chicago, Illinois, United States	Not Disclosed

== Muay Thai record ==
Muay Thai & Kickboxing record
8-1
Date	Result	Opponent	Event	Location	Method	Round	Time
2010-08-14	Win	(Brazil) Leonardo Monteiro	VI Desafio Profissional de Muay Thai, Final	São Paulo, Brazil	Decision	3	3:00
Tournament Winner.
2010-08-14	Win	(Brazil) Alex Oller	VI Desafio Profissional de Muay Thai, Semi Final	São Paulo, Brazil	Decision (Unanimous)	3	3:00
2010-08-14	Win	(Brazil) Gilmar Sales	VI Desafio Profissional de Muay Thai, Quarter Final	São Paulo, Brazil			
	Win	(Brazil) Julio Borges	FEPLAM	Brazil	Decision	5	3:00
2009-02-14	Win	(Brazil) Bruno Robusto	CBMT - Championship of Brazilian Muay Thai 2009	Niterói, Brazil	Decision (Split)	3	3:00
2007-11-10	Loss	(Brazil) Gilmar Sales	Demolition Fight VI	São Paulo, Brazil	Ext.R Decision	4	3:00
For the Demolition Fight -65kg title.
2007-10-20	Win	(Brazil) Dayvison Texeira	Brasileiros de Muay Thai - Final	Rio de Janeiro, Brazil	Ext.R Decision	4	3:00
Tournament Winner.
2007	Win	(Brazil) Alex Texeira	Brasileiros de Muay Thai - Semi Final	Rio de Janeiro, Brazil	Decision	3	3:00
2007	Win	(Brazil) Aldo	Brasileiros de Muay Thai - Quarter Final	Rio de Janeiro, Brazil	Decision	3	3:00
Legend: Win Loss Draw/No contest Notes

== See also ==
- List of current PFL fighters
- List of male mixed martial artists
