= Timur Valiev =

Russian mixed martial artist (born 1990)

- Born: January 19, 1990 (age 36); Makhachkala, Dagestan, Russia
- Other names: The Lucky
- Height: 5 ft 6 in (1.68 m)
- Weight: 135 lb (61 kg; 9.6 st)
- Division: Bantamweight; Featherweight (2018–present)
- Reach: 67 in (170 cm)
- Fighting out of: Toms River, New Jersey; Makhachkala, Russia
- Team: Dagestan Fighter Team; Renzo Gracie Combat Team (formerly); Nick Catone MMA
- Rank: Master of Sports in Sambo; International Master of Sports in Pankration; Brown belt in Brazilian Jiu-Jitsu under Ricardo Almeida
- Years active: 2010–present

Mixed martial arts record
- Total: 26
- Wins: 20
- By knockout: 5
- By submission: 3
- By decision: 12
- Losses: 5
- By decision: 5
- No contests: 1

Other information
- Mixed martial arts record from Sherdog

Timur Valiev (born January 19, 1990) is a Russian mixed martial artist who competes in the bantamweight division of Absolute Championship Akhmat (ACA). Valiev previously fought in the Ultimate Fighting Championship (UFC) and Professional Fighters League (PFL).

== Background ==
Timur Valiev was born on January 19, 1990, in Makhachkala, Dagestan, Russia. In the high school he competed in soccer, then at the age of sixteen on the advice of a friend he joined to Wushu Sanda. Also he trained kickboxing and thai boxing. He won a gold medal in European Pankration Championship and 3rd in World Cup.

== Mixed martial arts career ==
=== Early career ===
Valiev made his professional MMA debut on September 4, 2010, in Portugal at the World Ultimate Full Contact 16 against Olle Raberg of Sweden. He lost the fight via unanimous decision.

=== Eurasia Fight Nights Global ===
Valiev faced UFC hopeful Oleg Borisov on November 3, 2012, at the EFN - Battle of Moscow 8. He won the fight via unanimous decision.

=== World Series of Fighting ===
His WSOF debut was at the WSOF 10 on June 14, 2014, against Adam Acquaviva. He won the fight via technical knockout in the third round.

Valiev faced Isaiah Chapman at the WSOF 13 on September 13, 2014. He won thefight via unanimous decision.

Valiev faced Ed West at the WSOF 19 on March 28, 2015. He won the fight via technical knockout in the first round.

Valiev faced Tito Jones at the WSOF 23 on September 28, 2015. He won the fight via unanimous decision.

Valiev faced Chris Gutiérrez at the WSOF 28 on February 20, 2016. He lost the back-and-forth fight by split decision. After the fight WSOF president Ray Sefo did not agree with the result fight and gave a rematch for Valiev.

In their second fight, Valiev defeated Chris Gutiérrez at WSOF 33 on October 7, 2016, via unanimous decision.

Valiev was expected to face Bekbulat Magomedov on March 18, 2017, at WSOF 35 for vacant Bantamweight title. However, Valiev pulled out of the fight in the beginning of March citing an elbow injury and was replaced by Donavon Frelow.

=== Professional Fighters League ===
Valiev faced Josenaldo Silva on November 2, 2017, at PFL: Fight Night. He won the fight via submission in the third round.

Valiev faced Max Coga on June 7, 2018, at PFL 1. He won the fight by unanimous decision.

Originally a fight between Timur Valiev vs. Lee Coville was set, however due to undisclosed reasons Coville was forced to pull out, and was replaced by countrymen Bekbulat Magomedov on July 19, 2018, at PFL 4. He won the bout via unanimous decision.

=== Ultimate Fighting Championship ===
Valiev was scheduled to make his promotional debut against Jamall Emmers in a featherweight bout on August 1, 2020, at UFC Fight Night: Brunson vs. Shahbazyan. However, Valiev was removed from the card two days before the event for undisclosed reasons and replaced by Vincent Cachero.

Valiev was quickly rescheduled and expected to face fellow newcomer Mark Striegl on August 22, 2020, at UFC on ESPN 15. In turn, Striegl was removed from the fight on August 20 after testing positive for COVID-19 and replaced by Trevin Jones. Valiev lost the fight via TKO in the second round. On October 7, it was announced that the Nevada State Athletic Commission (NSAC) issued a four and a half month suspension for Trevin Jones, after he tested positive for marijuana in a drug test related to his fight. They also announced that Jones' victory was overturned to a no contest due to the violation. He was fined $1,800 and before he is relicensed in Las Vegas, Jones will also have to pay a prosecution fee of $145.36.

Valiev was expected to face Julio Arce on February 6, 2021, at UFC Fight Night 184. However, Arce was removed from the event in late January due to undisclosed reasons and replaced by Martin Day. He won the fight via unanimous decision.

Valiev faced Raoni Barcelos on June 26, 2021, at UFC Fight Night: Gane vs. Volkov. Despite being knocked down twice in the second round, Valiev won the fight via majority decision. This fight earned him the Fight of the Night award.

Valiev faced Jack Shore, replacing Umar Nurmagomedov, on March 19, 2022, at UFC Fight Night 204. He lost the fight via unanimous decision.

On June 23, 2022, it was announced that Valiev was no longer on the UFC roster.

=== The Ultimate Fighter 31 ===
In mid March 2023, it was announced that Valiev would be competing in the thirty-first season of The Ultimate Fighter 31.

Valiev was initially scheduled to face Trevor Wells in the Quarterfinal on the second episode, However the bout was postponed after a cold sore on Wells's face prevented him from being medically cleared to fight. The fight instead took place later on the fourth episode at a 142-pound catchweight. Valiev won the fight via unanimous decision.

In the semi-final round, Valiev faced The Ultimate Fighter Season 27 winner Brad Katona, and lost the fight via split decision.

=== Absolute Championship Akhmat ===
Valiev was scheduled to face fellow UFC vet Raulian Paiva on October 20, 2023 at UAE Warriors 45, however Paiva missed weight and the bout was scrapped.

On January 8, 2024 it was announced that Valiev has signed a deal with Absolute Championship Akhmat (ACA).

His ACA debut was at the ACA 172 on March 9, 2024, against Aleksandr Podlesniy, where he lost the fight via unanimous decision.

== Championships and accomplishments ==
=== Mixed martial arts ===
- Ultimate Fighting Championship
  - Fight of the Night (One time) vs. Raoni Barcelos

=== Pankration ===
- International Pankration Federation
  - World Champion.
  - European Champion.
  - World Cup - 3rd.

=== Grappling ===
- Russian Grappling Federation
  - Russian Open winner.

=== Kudo ===
- Russian Kudo Federation
  - Dagestan Championship - winner.

=== Hand-to-hand combat ===
- Russian HTH Federation
  - Dagestan Open - winner.

== Mixed martial arts record ==
Professional record breakdown
26 matches	20 wins	5 losses
By knockout	5	0
By submission	3	0
By decision	12	5
No contests	1	

Res.	Record	Opponent	Method	Event	Date	Round	Time	Location	Notes
Win	20–5 (1)	Shamil Boraev	Submission (kneebar)	ACA 208	October 4, 2026	2	1:47	Grozny, Russia	
Loss	19–5 (1)	David Dzhibilov	Decision (split)	ACA 190	August 15, 2025	3	5:00	Moscow, Russia	Return to Featherweight.
Win	19–4 (1)	Makharbek Karginov	Decision (split)	ACA 179	September 8, 2024	3	5:00	Krasnodar, Russia	
Loss	18–4 (1)	Alexander Podlesniy	Decision (unanimous)	ACA 172	March 9, 2024	3	5:00	Moscow, Russia	
Loss	18–3 (1)	Jack Shore	Decision (unanimous)	UFC Fight Night: Volkov vs. Aspinall	March 19, 2022	3	5:00	London, England	
Win	18–2 (1)	Raoni Barcelos	Decision (majority)	UFC Fight Night: Gane vs. Volkov	June 26, 2021	3	5:00	Las Vegas, Nevada, United States	Return to Bantamweight. Fight of the Night.
Win	17–2 (1)	Martin Day	Decision (unanimous)	UFC Fight Night: Overeem vs. Volkov	February 6, 2021	3	5:00	Las Vegas, Nevada, United States	
NC	16–2 (1)	Trevin Jones	NC (overturned)	UFC on ESPN: Munhoz vs. Edgar	August 22, 2020	2	1:59	Las Vegas, Nevada, United States	Catchweight (140 lb) bout. Originally a TKO (punches) win for Jones; overturned after he tested positive for marijuana.
Win	16–2	Taigro Costa	Decision (unanimous)	Gorilla Fighting 22	December 13, 2019	3	5:00	Krasnodar, Russia	
Win	15–2	Giovanni da Silva Santos Jr.	TKO (punches)	Gorilla Fighting 14	July 13, 2019	1	3:58	Kaspiysk, Russia	
Win	14–2	Bekbulat Magomedov	Decision (unanimous)	PFL 4 (2018)	July 19, 2018	3	5:00	Uniondale, New York, United States	
Win	13–2	Max Coga	Decision (unanimous)	PFL 1 (2018)	June 7, 2018	3	5:00	New York City, New York, United States	Return to Featherweight.
Win	12–2	Josenaldo Silva	Submission (rear-naked choke)	PFL Fight Night	November 2, 2017	3	2:12	Washington, D.C., United States	
Win	11–2	Chris Gutiérrez	Decision (unanimous)	WSOF 33	October 7, 2016	3	5:00	Kansas City, Missouri, United States	
Loss	10–2	Chris Gutiérrez	Decision (split)	WSOF 28	February 2, 2016	3	5:00	Garden Grove, California, United States	
Win	10–1	Tito Jones	Decision (unanimous)	WSOF 23	September 18, 2015	3	5:00	Phoenix, Arizona, United States	
Win	9–1	Ed West	TKO (elbows and punches)	WSOF 19	March 28, 2015	1	1:39	Phoenix, Arizona, United States	
Win	8–1	Isaiah Chapman	Decision (unanimous)	WSOF 13	September 13, 2014	3	5:00	Bethlehem, Pennsylvania, United States	
Win	7–1	Adam Acquaviva	TKO (flying knee)	WSOF 10	June 21, 2014	3	1:35	Las Vegas, Nevada, United States	Return to Bantamweight.
Win	6–1	Bruno Marques	Decision (unanimous)	Battle of Stars 2	June 16, 2012	3	5:00	Makhachkala, Russia	
Win	5–1	Oleg Borisov	Decision (unanimous)	Fight Nights Global: Battle of Moscow 8	November 3, 2012	3	5:00	Moscow, Russia	Featherweight debut.
Win	4–1	Algiz Vakhitov	TKO (punches)	Colosseum Battles Champions 1	October 21, 2012	1	1:34	Ufa, Russia	
Win	3–1	Evgeniy Lazukov	TKO (punches)	Dictator FC 1	June 28, 2012	1	4:36	Moscow, Russia	
Win	2–1	Fernando Cosenday	Decision (unanimous)	Top Fight: Battle of the Gyms	February 25, 2012	2	5:00	Dubai, United Arab Emirates	
Win	1–1	Gadzhimurad Gasanov	Submission (armbar)	Urkarakh Fights 1	July 22, 2011	1	4:28	Urkarakh, Russia	
Loss	0–1	Olle Raberg	Decision (unanimous)	World Ultimate Full Contact 16	September 4, 2010	1	10:00	Viseu, Portugal	Bantamweight debut.

== Mixed martial arts exhibition record ==
Exhibition record breakdown		
2 matches	1 win	1 loss
By decision	1	1

Res.	Record	Opponent	Method	Event	Date	Round	Time	Location	Notes
Loss	1–1	Brad Katona	Decision (split)	The Ultimate Fighter: Team McGregor vs. Team Chandler	Aug 1, 2023 (airdate)	3	5:00	Las Vegas, Nevada, United States	The Ultimate Fighter 31 Semi-final round.
Win	1–0	Trevor Wells	Decision (unanimous)	The Ultimate Fighter: Team McGregor vs. Team Chandler	Jun 20, 2023 (airdate)	2	5:00	Las Vegas, Nevada, United States	The Ultimate Fighter 31 Quarterfinal round. Catchweight (142 lb) bout.

== See also ==
- List of male mixed martial artists
