= PFL Africa 4 (2026) =

Professional Fighters League MMA event in 2026

PFL Africa 4: Kigali
- The poster for PFL Africa 4: Kigali
- Promotion: Professional Fighters League
- Date: December 12, 2026
- Venue: BK Arena
- City: Kigali, Rwanda

Event chronology
PFL MENA 12: MMA's Most Wanted	PFL Africa 4: Kigali	PFL Lyon: Lapilus vs. McKee

2026 PFL Africa 4: Kigali is an upcoming mixed martial arts event produced by the Professional Fighters League that is scheduled to take place on December 12, 2026, at the BK Arena in Kigali, Rwanda.

== Background ==
The event will mark the promotion's second visit to Kigali and first since PFL Africa 3 (2025) in October 2025.

The event will feature the finals of 2026 PFL Africa Tournament in a welterweight, lightweight and bantamweight divisions. Demba Seck pulled out from the lightweight tournament against Patrick Ocheme for unknown reasons and was replaced by Hussain Al Kurdi, who fought against Seck in the semifinal, which ended by no-contest due to accidental groin strike.

== Fight card ==
Main card (YouTube / Vice TV)
Weight class				Method	Round	Time	Notes
Welterweight	Shido Boris Esperança	vs.	David Samuel				(Note: 2026 PFL Africa Welterweight Tournament Final.)
Lightweight	Patrick Ocheme	vs.	Hussain Al Kurdi				(Note: 2026 PFL Africa Lightweight Tournament Final.)
Bantamweight	Dwight Joseph	vs.	Raphael Uchegbu				(Note: 2026 PFL Africa Bantamweight Tournament Final.)
Women's Strawweight	Juliet Ukah	vs.	Benita van Rooij
Heavyweight	Justin Clarke	vs.	Kevin Odongo
Preliminary card (YouTube / Vice TV)
Middleweight	Emmanuel Lamptey	vs.	Jordan Cabrel Fongno
Welterweight	Mouhamed Ba	vs.	Rivaldo Pereira
Women's Strawweight	Felista Mugo	vs.	Sephora Kiala
Welterweight	Dona Salim Zigui	vs.	Berci Noel Moufouha
Bantamweight	Boule Godogo	vs.	Ridouan Errami
Middleweight	Yahaya Yahuza	vs.	Eslam Abdul Baset
Lightweight	Cornel Thompson	vs.	Mor Dieye
Bantamweight	Bilal Lamkhanat	vs.	Isaac Omeda

== 2026 PFL Africa Tournament ==
=== 2026 PFL Africa Welterweight Tournament ===
Quarter-finals
(Guinea-Bissau) Rivaldo Pereira (Note: Eliezer Kubanza withdrew from the tournament and was replaced by Rivaldo Pereira.)	TKO
(Nigeria) Kunle Lawal	1
(Nigeria) David Samuel	SUB
(Egypt) Abdelrahman Mohamed	1
(Angola) Shido Boris Esperança	TKO
(Cameroon) Emilios Dassi	1
(South Africa) Peace Nguphane	UD
(Guinea-Bissau) Yabna N'Tchalá	3

Semi-finals
(Guinea-Bissau) Rivaldo Pereira	3
(Nigeria) David Samuel	UD
(Angola) Shido Boris Esperança	TKO
(South Africa) Peace Nguphane	1

Final
(Nigeria) David Samuel
(Angola) Shido Boris Esperança

=== 2026 PFL Africa Lightweight Tournament ===
Quarter-finals
(Nigeria) Patrick Ocheme	KO
(Cameroon) Ayinda Octave	1
(Angola) Áureo Cruz (Note: Tshilomba Mikixi withdrew from the tournament and was replaced by Áureo Cruz.)	3
(Nigeria) Cornel Thompson	UD
(Senegal) Demba Seck	UD
(Benin) Jean Do Santos	3
(Chad) Hussain Al Kurdi	SUB
(Morocco) Abderrahman Errachidy	2

Semi-finals
(Nigeria) Patrick Ocheme	KO
(Nigeria) Cornel Thompson	1
(Senegal) Demba Seck	NC (Note: Accidental knee to the groin rendered Seck unable to continue; the judge picked him advanced to the final. .)
(Chad) Hussain Al Kurdi	1

Final
(Nigeria) Patrick Ocheme
(Senegal) Demba Seck

=== 2026 PFL Africa Bantamweight Tournament ===
Quarter-finals

Semi-finals

Final

(Tanzania) Dauda Rajabu
2

(Angola) Boule Godogo
TKO

(Angola) Boule Godogo
3

(Liberia) Dwight Joseph
SD

(Cameroon) Alain Majorique
3

(Liberia) Dwight Joseph
SD

(Liberia) Dwight Joseph

(Nigeria) Raphael Uchegbu

(Nigeria) Raphael Uchegbu
UD

(Mozambique) Edson Machavane
3

(Nigeria) Raphael Uchegbu (Note: Karim Henniene withdrew from the tournament and was replaced by Alain Majorique, who in turn missed weight. Therefore Raphael Uchegbu advanced to final.)
BYE

(Cameroon) Alain Majorique
–

(South Africa) Thimna Mhlauli
1

(Algeria) Karim Henniene
SUB

== See also ==
- 2026 in Professional Fighters League
- List of PFL events
- List of current PFL fighters
