= Mike Corey =

American mixed martial arts fighter (born 1984)

- Born: March 8, 1984 (age 42); O'Fallon, Missouri, United States
- Nationality: American
- Height: 5 ft 9 in (1.75 m)
- Weight: 145 lb (66 kg; 10.4 st)
- Division: Lightweight
- Reach: 67 1/2 in (171 cm)
- Fighting out of: Chicago, Illinois, United States
- Team: Team Curran
- Years active: 2005–2009; 2011-2014

Mixed martial arts record
- Total: 17
- Wins: 13
- By knockout: 1
- By submission: 7
- By decision: 5
- Losses: 3
- By knockout: 1
- By decision: 2
- Draws: 1

Other information
- Mixed martial arts record from Sherdog

Mike Corey (born March 8, 1984) is an American former mixed martial artist. A professional from 2005 until 2014, he fought in the IFL and the World Series of Fighting.

== Biography ==
A high-school wrestler, Corey joined the Marines and started MMA training while stationed in California, and won several Grapplers Quest tournaments.

Corey made his return against Tom Ahrens, in which he had a clear-cut decision win, winning all three rounds.

Corey trained with Team Curran MMA in Crystal Lake, Illinois, and with fighters such as Jeff Curra, Pat Curran and Bart Palaszewski. He currently teaches in the west and southwest suburbs of Chicago.

=== Bellator Fighting Championships ===
Corey faced Chris Horodecki in his Bellator debut at Bellator 57. They fought to a majority draw (29-28, 28-28, 28-28).

Corey returned to the promotion as a replacement for Wagnney Fabiano against Ronnie Mann in the opening round of the Featherweight tournament at Bellator 60 on March 9, 2012. After being knocked down twice in the opening round, Corey fought back to win the next two rounds, securing a unanimous decision victory.

=== World Series of Fighting ===
Corey faced Shane Kruchten at WSOF 9 on March 29, 2014. He won the fight via rear-naked choke submission in the second round.

== Mixed martial arts record ==
Professional record breakdown
17 matches	13 wins	3 losses
By knockout	1	1
By submission	7	0
By decision	5	2
Draws	1	

Res.	Record	Opponent	Method	Event	Date	Round	Time	Location	Notes
Win	13–3–1	Shane Kruchten	Submission (rear-naked choke)	WSOF 9	March 29, 2014	2	2:59	Las Vegas, Nevada, United States	
Loss	12–3–1	Daniel Mason-Straus	Decision (unanimous)	Bellator 65	April 13, 2012	3	5:00	Atlantic City, New Jersey, United States	Bellator Season 6 Featherweight Tournament Semifinal.
Win	12–2–1	Ronnie Mann	Decision (unanimous)	Bellator 60	March 9, 2012	3	5:00	Hammond, Indiana, United States	Bellator Season 6 Featherweight Tournament Quarterfinal; Featherweight Debut.
Draw	11–2–1	Chris Horodecki	Draw (majority)	Bellator 57	November 12, 2011	3	5:00	Rama, Ontario, Canada	
Win	11–2	Tom Ahrens	Decision (unanimous)	XFO 38	January 22, 2011	3	5:00	Woodstock, Illinois, United States	
Win	10–2	David Castillo	Submission (rear-naked choke)	Raw Power: MMA	December 10, 2009	2	N/A	Sanabis, Bahrain	
Win	9–2	Jonathan Murphy	Decision (unanimous)	XFO 31	August 15, 2009	3	5:00	Island Lake, Illinois, United States	
Win	8–2	Tyler Combs	Submission (arm-triangle choke)	XFO 27	December 6, 2008	1	1:49	Lakemoor, Illinois, United States	
Win	7–2	Dwayne Shelton	TKO	UWC: Invasion	April 26, 2008	2	0:43	Fairfax, Virginia, United States	
Loss	6–2	Shad Lierley	Decision (split)	IFL: Moline	April 7, 2007	3	4:00	Moline, Illinois, United States	
Win	6–1	Greg LaJoye	Submission (triangle choke)	ISCF: Invasion	February 9, 2007	1	1:27	Kennesaw, Georgia, United States	
Win	5–1	Ryan Bixler	Decision (unanimous)	SC: Season's Beatings	December 2, 2006	3	5:00	Springfield, Illinois, United States	
Win	4–1	Brian Cobb	Decision (unanimous)	PF 2: Live MMA	August 18, 2006	3	5:00	Hollywood, California, United States	
Win	3–1	Adrian Camacho	Submission (kimura)	RM 8: Reto Maximo 8	February 25, 2006	2	N/A	Tijuana, Mexico	
Loss	2–1	Cub Swanson	TKO (cut)	KOTC 61: Flash Point	September 23, 2005	2	2:52	San Jacinto, California, United States	
Win	2–0	Nate Craig	Submission (armbar)	XCF 8: Xtreme Cage Fighter 8	April 9, 2005	1	1:17	California, United States	
Win	1-0	Tony Garcia	Submission (strikes)	CFC 2: Crown Fighting 2	March 26, 2005	1	2:20	Mexico	
