= World Series of Fighting 32: Moraes vs. Hill 2 =

World Series of Fighting MMA event in 2016

- Promotion: World Series of Fighting
- Date: July 30, 2016
- Venue: Xfinity Arena
- City: Everett, Washington, United States

Event chronology
World Series of Fighting Global Championship 3: Philippines	World Series of Fighting 32: Moraes vs. Hill 2	World Series of Fighting 33: Branch vs. Magalhães

World Series of Fighting 32: Moraes vs. Hill 2 was a mixed martial arts event held on July 30, 2016 at the Xfinity Arena in Everett, Washington, United States.

== Background ==
The event was headlined by a rematch for the WSOF Bantamweight Championship between Marlon Moraes and Josh Hill.

In the co-main event Alexandre Almeida put up his WSOF Featherweight Championship in a rematch against former champion Lance Palmer.

== Results ==
Main Card (NBCSN)
Weight class				Method	Round	Time	Notes
Bantamweight	Marlon Moraes (c)	def.	Josh Hill	KO (head kick and punches)	2	0:38	(Note: For WSOF Bantamweight Championship)
Featherweight	Lance Palmer	def.	Alexandre Almeida (c)	Decision (majority) (49–46, 48–48, 50–45)	5	5:00	(Note: For WSOF Featherweight Championship)
Catchweight (162 lbs)	Caros Fodor	def.	Phoenix Jones	Decision (unanimous) (30–26, 30–26, 30–26)	3	5:00
Middleweight	Louis Taylor	def.	Phil Hawes	Submission (guillotine choke)	2	2:15
Preliminary card (WSOF.com)
Featherweight	Hakeem Dawodu	def.	Marat Magomedov	TKO (punches)	2	2:03
Middleweight	Rex Harris	def.	Nicolai Salchow	Decision (unanimous) (30–27, 30–27, 30–27)	3	5:00
Welterweight	Andrews Nakahara	def.	Travis Doerge	TKO (knee and punches)	1	0:55
Heavyweight	Matt Kovacs	def.	Bill Widler	TKO (punches)	1	4:22
Lightweight	Brett Malone	def.	Patrick Benson	Submission (rear-naked choke)	1	4:20
Lightweight	Matt Coble	def.	Colt Hausauer	Submission (rear-naked choke)	2	1:52
Bantamweight	Tycen Lynn	def.	Justin Williams-Hugo	Submission (triangle choke)	1	2:17
Bantamweight	Joey Elzea	def.	Marcos Lopez	Submission (armbar)	2	4:34

== See also ==
- List of WSOF events
- List of WSOF champions
