= PFL Lyon: Lapilus vs. McKee =

Professional Fighters League MMA event in 2026

- The poster for PFL Lyon: Lapilus vs. McKee
- Promotion: Professional Fighters League
- Date: December 19, 2026
- Venue: LDLC Arena
- City: Décines-Charpieu, France

Event chronology
PFL Africa 4: Kigali	PFL Lyon: Lapilus vs. McKee

PFL Lyon: Lapilus vs. McKee (also known as PFL Lyon 2026) is an upcoming mixed martial arts event produced by the Professional Fighters League that is scheduled to take place on December 19, 2026, at LDLC Arena in Décines-Charpieu, France.

== Background ==
The event will mark the promotion's third visit to Décines-Charpieu in the Metropolis of Lyon and first since PFL Lyon: Nemkov vs. Ferreira in December 2025.

This will be also the final event under the PFL banner before the promotion begins operating under the Most Valuable Promotions as January 2027, following the merger of the two organizations.

An inaugural PFL Bantamweight Championship bout between Taylor Lapilus and undefeated prospect Mitchell McKee is scheduled to headline the event.

== Fight card ==
Main card (ESPN+)
Weight class				Method	Round	Time	Notes
Bantamweight	Taylor Lapilus	vs.	Mitchell McKee				(Note: For the inaugural PFL Bantamweight Championship.)
Middleweight	Bryan Battle	vs.	Boris Mbarga Atangana
Welterweight	Abdoul Abdouraguimov	vs.	Andreeas Binder
Welterweight	Oualy Tandia	vs.	Alex Lohoré
Middleweight	Fabian Edwards	vs.	Ilian Bouafia
Preliminary card (ESPN+)
Bantamweight	Baris Adiguzel	vs.	Jack Cartwright
Light Heavyweight	Bafode Gassama	vs.	Coby Bradford
Bantamweight	Dean Garnett	vs.	Bryce Meredith
Bantamweight	Jan Ciepłowski	vs.	Mauricio Partida
Bantamweight	Brandon Brachet	vs.	Adam Meskini
Featherweight	Zakaria Hamou	vs.	Amin Bouazza
Women's Strawweight	Mathilde Aschenbrenner	vs.	Shelda Chipito

== See also ==
- 2026 in Professional Fighters League
- List of PFL events
- List of current PFL fighters
