= World Series of Fighting 22: Palhares vs. Shields =

World Series of Fighting MMA event in 2015

- Promotion: World Series of Fighting
- Date: August 1, 2015
- Venue: Planet Hollywood Resort & Casino
- City: Las Vegas, Nevada, United States
- Attendance: 673

Event chronology
| World Series of Fighting 21: Palmer vs. Horodecki | World Series of Fighting 22: Palhares vs. Shields | World Series of Fighting 23: Gaethje vs. Palomino II |

World Series of Fighting 22: Palhares vs. Shields was a mixed martial arts event held August 1, 2015 in Las Vegas, Nevada, United States. This event aired on NBCSN in the U.S and on Fight Network in Canada.

== Background ==
The event went head-to-head with UFC 190 on the same night.

The main event was scheduled to be a fight for the WSOF Welterweight Championship between champion Rousimar Palhares making his second defence of his title against challenger Jake Shields.

The co-main event was scheduled to be a fight for the WSOF Bantamweight Championship between champion Marlon Moraes making his second defence of his title against challenger Sheymon Moraes.

Tyrone Spong was expected to face Mike Kyle at the event. However, Spong pulled out of the bout due to an injury and was replaced by Thiago Silva. In turn, Silva was forced out of the bout after being deemed ineligible to receive a license by the Nevada State Athletic Commission. Short notice replacement Clifford Starks stepped in to face Kyle at the event.

== Results ==
Main Card (NBCSN)
| Weight class | | | | Method | Round | Time | Notes |
|---|---|---|---|---|---|---|---|
| Welterweight | Rousimar Palhares (c) | def. | Jake Shields | Submission (kimura) | 3 | 2:02 | (Note: For the WSOF Welterweight Championship.) |
| Bantamweight | Marlon Moraes (c) | def. | Sheymon Moraes | Submission (rear-naked choke) | 3 | 3:46 | (Note: For the WSOF Bantamweight Championship.) |
| Light Heavyweight | Clifford Starks | def. | Mike Kyle | Decision (unanimous) (29–28, 29–28, 30–27) | 3 | 5:00 |
| Welterweight | Abubakar Nurmagomedov | def. | Jorge Moreno | Decision (unanimous) (30–26, 30–26, 30–27) | 3 | 5:00 |
| Lightweight | Islam Mamedov | def. | Jimmy Spicuzza | TKO (punches) | 1 | 4:47 |
Preliminary Card (WSOF.com)
| Light Heavyweight | Jake Heun | def. | Davin Clark | Submission (arm-triangle choke) | 3 | 2:46 |
| Flyweight | Donavon Frelow | def | Carlos Garcia | Submission (guillotine choke) | 1 | 2:49 |
| Featherweight | Marco Simmons | def. | Jimmy Jones | Submission (rear-naked choke) | 2 | 2:23 |
| Light Heavyweight | Cory Hendricks | def. | Julio Hinojosa | Submission (guillotine choke) | 1 | 1:08 |
| Lightweight | Gil Guardado | def. | Pete Martin | Submission (guillotine choke) | 1 | 3:31 |

== Guest live appearances ==
For the closing of the Preliminary Card Livestream, a guest set was performed by Venezuelan eOne Music artist DJ Zardonic including a performance of "Bring It On", a track that served as the WSOF theme song in 2015.

== See also ==
- World Series of Fighting
- List of WSOF champions
- List of WSOF events
