= World Series of Fighting 21: Palmer vs. Horodecki =

World Series of Fighting MMA event in 2015

- Promotion: World Series of Fighting
- Date: June 5, 2015
- Venue: Edmonton Expo Centre
- City: Edmonton, Alberta, Canada
- Attendance: 3,225

Event chronology
World Series of Fighting 20: Branch vs. McElligott	World Series of Fighting 21: Palmer vs. Horodecki	World Series of Fighting 22: Palhares vs. Shields

World Series of Fighting 21: Palmer vs. Horodecki was a mixed martial arts event held on June 5, 2015 in Edmonton, Alberta, Canada. This event aired on NBCSN in the U.S and on Fight Network in Canada.

== Background ==
The main event was originally scheduled to feature a middleweight fight between Yushin Okami and WSOF Canadian Welterweight Champion Ryan Ford. However, Ford was forced out of the bout due to an injury and the pairing was scrapped.

The main event was then changed to a WSOF Featherweight Championship fight between champion Lance Palmer and WEC & Bellator MMA veteran Chris Horodecki.

The co-main event featured a WSOF Heavyweight Championship fight between champion Smealinho Rama and Bellator MMA veteran Blagoy Ivanov.

== Results ==
Main Card (NBCSN)
Weight class				Method	Round	Time	Notes
Featherweight	Lance Palmer (c)	def.	Chris Horodecki	Submission (neck crank)	1	4:28	(Note: For the WSOF Featherweight Championship.)
Heavyweight	Blagoy Ivanov	def.	Smealinho Rama (c)	Submission (guillotine choke)	3	1:17	(Note: For the WSOF Heavyweight Championship.)
Featherweight	Hakeem Dawodu	def.	Chuka Willis	TKO (knees and elbows)	2	2:55
Preliminary Card (WSOF.com)
Catchweight (190 lb)	Thiago Gonçalves	def.	Matt Baker	TKO (retirement)	2	5:00
Lightweight	Justin Sander	def.	Dan Lariviere	Submission (arm-triangle choke)	2	2:52
Bantamweight	Michael Hay	def.	Louie Grover	Submission (armbar)	1	2:17
Postliminary Card (WSOF.com)
Lightweight	Stephen Beaumont	def.	Jose Rodriguez	Decision (unanimous) (30–26, 30–26, 30–26)	3	5:00
Lightweight	Spencer Rohovie	def.	Tim Smith	Submission (rear-naked choke)	1	3:09
Lightweight	Garret Nybakken	def.	Nick Hrabec	KO (punches)	1	3:36
Lightweight	Roger Alves	def.	Danny Doig	Submission (arm-triangle choke)	1	2:49
Welterweight	Michael Hill	def.	Mark Drummond	Decision (split) (29–28, 28–29, 29–28)	3	5:00

== See also ==
- List of WSOF champions
- List of WSOF events
