= World Series of Fighting 13: Moraes vs. Bollinger =

World Series of Fighting mixed martial arts event in 2014

- Promotion: World Series of Fighting
- Date: September 13, 2014
- Venue: Sands Casino Resort Bethlehem
- City: (United States) Bethlehem, Pennsylvania, US
- Attendance: 749

Event chronology
World Series of Fighting 12: Palomino vs. Gonzalez	World Series of Fighting 13: Moraes vs. Bollinger	World Series of Fighting 14: Ford vs. Shields

World Series of Fighting 13: Moraes vs. Bollinger was a mixed martial arts event held September 13, 2014 in Bethlehem, Pennsylvania, United States, The event aired on NBCSN.

== Background ==
Marlon Moraes was originally set to make his first title defense against Canadian Josh Hill at this event. However, Hill was forced out with an injury and was replaced by Cody Bollinger. With the bout being on such short notice, the fight was announced as a non-title, catchweight bout at 140 lbs.

On the day of the weigh-ins, Bollinger realized that he would not be able to make the 140 lb limit and the catchweight was increased to 147 lbs. Bollinger had a long history of failing to make weight, including being kicked out of the TUF house in UFC for failure to do so. In an interview with Bollinger's trainer during the broadcast, it was revealed that Bollinger weighed 170 lbs just prior to going into the cage with Moraes.

== Results ==
Main card
Weight class				Method	Round	Time	Notes
Catchweight (147 lb)	Marlon Moraes	def.	Cody Bollinger	Submission (rear-naked choke)	2	1:35
Lightweight	Ozzy Dugulubgov	def.	Keon Caldwell	KO (punch)	3	1:38
Bantamweight	Timur Valiev	def.	Isaiah Chapman	Decision (unanimous) (30–27, 30–27, 30–26)	3	5:00
Lightweight	Frankie Perez	def.	Tommy Marcellino	Decision (unanimous) (30–27, 30–27, 30–27)	3	5:00
Preliminary card
Welterweight	Tenyeh Dixon	def.	Emmanuel Walo	Decision (split) (29–28, 28–29, 29–28)	3	5:00
Catchweight (164 lb)	Nick Browne	def.	Sidney Outlaw	TKO (punches)	1	0:25
Flyweight	Katlyn Chookagian	def.	Brigitte Narcise	KO (knees)	3	0:38
Welterweight	Matt Secor	def.	Brett Shoenfelt	Submission (rear-naked choke)	2	4:31
Flyweight	Sidemar Honorio	def.	Matt Lozano	TKO (arm injury)	3	0:28
Catchweight (160 lb)	Luciano Cristovam	def.	Francisco Isata	Decision (unanimous) (30–27, 30–27, 30–27)	3	5:00

== See also ==
- World Series of Fighting
- List of WSOF champions
- List of WSOF events
