= World Series of Fighting 28: Moraes vs. Barajas =

World Series of Fighting MMA event in 2016

- Promotion: World Series of Fighting
- Date: February 20, 2016
- Venue: Next Level Sports Complex
- City: Garden Grove, California

Event chronology
World Series of Fighting Global Championship 2: Japan	World Series of Fighting 28: Moraes vs. Barajas	World Series of Fighting 29: Gaethje vs. Foster

World Series of Fighting 28: Moraes vs. Barajas was a mixed martial arts event held on February 20, 2016 at the Next Level Sports Complex in Garden Grove, California.

== Background ==
The event was headlined by a WSOF Bantamweight Championship fight between champion Marlon Moraes and Joseph Barajas, and also featured two BAMMA USA bouts, including a Lightweight Championship fight between Chris Saunders and Darren Smith.

== Results ==
Main Card (NBCSN)
Weight class				Method	Round	Time	Notes
Bantamweight	Marlon Moraes (c)	def.	Joseph Barajas	TKO (leg kicks)	1	1:13	(Note: For the WSOF Bantamweight Championship.)
Bantamweight	Chris Gutiérrez	def.	Timur Valiev	Decision (split) (27–30, 29–28, 29–28)	3	5:00
Welterweight	Jamie Yager	def.	Daniel McWilliams	Submission (scarf hold armlock)	1	0:38
Welterweight	Ozzie Alvarez	def.	Andrew Ramm	Decision (unanimous) (30–27, 30–27, 29–28)	3	5:00
BAMMA Badbeat 18 (WSOF.com)
Lightweight	Chris Saunders (c)	def.	Darren Smith	Decision (unanimous) (30–27, 29–28, 29–28)	3	5:00	(Note: For the BAMMA USA Lightweight Championship.)
Bantamweight	Albert Morales	def.	Anthony Paredes	Decision (unanimous) (30–27, 29–28, 29–28)	3	5:00
Flyweight	Steve Ramirez	def.	Kyle Estrada	KO (punches)	1	1:01
Catchweight (190 lb)	Isaias Alvarado	def.	Garrick Evans	TKO (punches)	1	3:21
Flyweight	Heinrich Wassmer	def.	Keenan Lewis	Submission (rear-naked choke)	3	3:02
Lightweight	Jalin Turner	def.	Eric Steans	KO (punch)	1	0:38
Bantamweight	Fard Muhammad	def.	Mike Kubeska	Decision (majority) (29–27, 28–27, 28–28)	3	5:00

== See also ==
- List of WSOF events
- List of WSOF champions
