= World Series of Fighting 16: Palhares vs. Fitch =

World Series of Fighting MMA event in 2014

- Promotion: World Series of Fighting
- Date: December 13, 2014
- Venue: McClellan Conference Center
- City: Sacramento, California, United States
- Attendance: 1,100

Event chronology
World Series of Fighting 15: Branch vs. Okami	World Series of Fighting 16: Palhares vs. Fitch	World Series of Fighting 17: Shields vs. Foster

World Series of Fighting 16: Palhares vs. Fitch was a mixed martial arts event held December 13, 2014 in Sacramento, California, United States. This event aired on NBCSN in the U.S and on TSN2 in Canada.

== Background ==
WSOF 16 featured two championship title bouts: The main event was a fight for the WSOF Welterweight Championship between champion Rousimar Palhares and challenger Jon Fitch.

The co-main event was a fight for the WSOF Featherweight Championship between champion Rick Glenn and Lance Palmer.

== Results ==
Main Card
Weight class				Method	Round	Time	Notes
Welterweight	Rousimar Palhares (c)	def.	Jon Fitch	Submission (kneebar)	1	1:30	(Note: For the WSOF Welterweight Championship.)
Featherweight	Lance Palmer	def.	Ricky Glenn (c)	Submission (rear-naked choke)	3	3:09	(Note: For the WSOF Featherweight Championship.)
Bantamweight	Sheymon Moraes	def.	Gaberiel Solorio	Decision (split) (29–28, 29–28, 30–27)	3	5:00
Featherweight	Josh Berkovic	def.	Brenson Hanson	Decision (unanimous) (29–28, 29–28, 29–28)	3	5:00
Welterweight	Lewis Gonzalez	def.	Justin Buchholz	Decision (split) (30–27, 28–29, 29–28)	3	5:00
Preliminary card
Super Heavyweight	Dave Huckaba	def.	C.J. Leveque	TKO (punches)	2	1:47
Welterweight	David Mitchell	def.	Justin Baesman	Submission (rear-naked choke)	1	1:44
Catchweight (175 lb)	Dominic Waters	def.	Martin Sano	Decision (unanimous) (29–28, 29–28, 30–27)	3	5:00
Featherweight	Erick Sanchez	def.	Drey Mitchell	Decision (unanimous) (29–28, 29–28, 30–27)	3	5:00
Featherweight	Jason Powell	def.	Chris Avila	Decision (unanimous) (30–27, 30–27, 30–27)	3	5:00
Flyweight	Joseph Morales	def.	Christian Espinosa	Decision (unanimous) (30–26, 30–27, 30–27)	3	5:00
Amateur bout
Lightweight	Justin Durham	def.	Dylan Blakesly	Decision (unanimous)	3	3:00

== See also ==
- World Series of Fighting
- List of WSOF champions
- List of WSOF events
