= World Series of Fighting 17: Shields vs. Foster =

World Series of Fighting mixed martial arts event in 2015

- Promotion: World Series of Fighting
- Date: January 17, 2015
- Venue: Hard Rock Hotel & Casino
- City: Las Vegas, Nevada, United States
- Attendance: 1,006

Event chronology
World Series of Fighting 16: Palhares vs. Fitch	World Series of Fighting 17: Shields vs. Foster	World Series of Fighting 18: Moraes vs. Hill

World Series of Fighting 17: Shields vs. Foster was a mixed martial arts event held January 17, 2015 in Las Vegas, Nevada, United States. This event aired on NBCSN in the US and on TSN2 in Canada.

== Background ==
The main event was a fight between former Strikeforce Middleweight Champion Jake Shields and Brian Foster.

== Results ==
Main card
Weight class				Method	Round	Time	Notes
Welterweight	Jake Shields	def.	Brian Foster	Submission (neck crank)	1	2:51
Lightweight	Joe Condon	def.	Johnny Nunez	Submission (guillotine choke)	3	4:22
Middleweight	Krasimir Mladenov	def.	Brendan Kornberger	Decision (unanimous) (29–28, 30–27, 30–27)	3	5:00
Bantamweight	Bryson Hansen	def.	Rudy Morales	Decision (unanimous) (30–25, 30–26, 30–27)	3	5:00
Welterweight	Danny Davis Jr.	def.	Adam Cella	Decision (unanimous) (29–27, 29–27, 29–27)	3	5:00
Preliminary card
Featherweight	Jordan Rinaldi	def.	Soslan Abanokov	Submission (inverted triangle keylock)	3	3:02
Flyweight	Donavon Frelow	def.	Taylor McCorriston	Decision (unanimous) (29–28, 29–28, 29–28)	3	5:00
Middleweight	Trey Williams	def.	Jamie Point	Technical Submission (anaconda choke)	1	3:52

== See also ==
- World Series of Fighting
- List of WSOF champions
- List of WSOF events
