= WSOF Global Championship 3: Philippines =

World Series of Fighting MMA event in 2016

World Series of Fighting Global Championship 3: Philippines
- The poster for World Series of Fighting Global Championship 3: Philippines
- Promotion: World Series of Fighting Global Championship
- Date: July 30, 2016
- Venue: Smart Araneta Coliseum
- City: Quezon City, Philippines

Event chronology
World Series of Fighting 31: Ivanov vs. Copeland	World Series of Fighting Global Championship 3: Philippines	World Series of Fighting 32: Moraes vs. Hill 2

World Series of Fighting Global Championship 3: Philippines was a mixed martial arts event held on July 30, 2016 at the Smart Araneta Coliseum in Quezon City, Philippines.

== Background ==
The event was headlined by a fight between Evgeny Erokhin and Richard Odoms for the WSOF Global Heavyweight Championship.

== Results ==
Fight Card
Weight class				Method	Round	Time	Notes
Heavyweight	Evgeny Erokhin	def.	Richard Odoms	KO (punch)	1	1:11	(Note: For the WSOF-GC Heavyweight Championship.)
Featherweight	Keremuaili Maimaitituoheti	def.	Mario Sismundo	Submission (rear-naked choke)	2	2:57
Flyweight	Yusaku Nakamura	def.	Tim Moore	Decision (unanimous) (30–27, 30–27, 30–27)	3	5:00
Women's Atomweight	Jujeath Nagaowa	def.	Yuko Kiryu	Decision (unanimous) (30–27, 30–27, 30–27)	3	5:00
Flyweight	Lawrence DiGiulio	def.	Marcel Adur	Decision (split) (29–28, 28–29, 30–27)	3	5:00
Featherweight	Ahmed Mujtaba	def.	Neil Larano	Submission (triangle choke)	1	1:08
Lightweight	Kelvin Ong	def.	Jessdan Dela Pena	TKO (punches)	2	0:24
Flyweight	Uloomi Karim	def.	Yadwinder Singh	Decision (unanimous) (30–27, 30–27, 29–28)	3	5:00
Women's Strawweight	Katherine Roy	def.	May Ooi	Decision (unanimous) (30–27, 30–27, 30–27)	3	5:00
Postliminary card
Women's Strawweight	Nayara Hemily	def.	Jenelyn Olsim	Submission (rear-naked choke)	2	3:50

== See also ==
- List of WSOF champions
- List of WSOF events
