= World Series of Fighting 26: Palmer vs. Almeida =

World Series of Fighting MMA event in 2015

- Promotion: World Series of Fighting
- Date: December 18, 2015
- Venue: The Chelsea at The Cosmopolitan
- City: Paradise, Nevada, United States

Event chronology
World Series of Fighting Global Championship 1: China	World Series of Fighting 26: Palmer vs. Almeida	World Series of Fighting 27: Future Champs

World Series of Fighting 26: Palmer vs. Almeida is a mixed martial arts event held December 18, 2015 in Paradise, Nevada, United States. This event aired on NBCSN in the U.S and on Fight Network in Canada.

== Background ==
The main event was scheduled to be a featherweight title fight between Lance Palmer and Alexandre de Almeida

The co-main event was scheduled to be a fight between Tyrone Spong and Jake Heun.

Tyrone Spong suffered an injury and was replaced by Clinton Williams, who will fight Jake Heun.

== Results ==
Fight Card (NBC Sports)
Weight class				Method	Round	Time	Notes
Featherweight	Alexandre de Almeida	def.	Lance Palmer (c)	Decision (unanimous) (48–47, 48–47, 48–47)	5	5:00	(Note: For the WSOF Featherweight Championship.)
Lightweight	Azamat Dugulubgov	def.	Nic Herron-Webb	Decision (unanimous) (30–27, 30–27, 30–27)	3	5:00
Featherweight	Sheymon Moraes	def.	Robbie Peralta	TKO (punches)	2	3:21
Bantamweight	Josh Hill	def.	Bekbulat Magomedov	Decision (split) (28–29, 30–27, 30–27)	3	5:00
Light Heavyweight	Jake Heun	def.	Clinton Williams	Decision (split) (29–28, 28–29, 29–28)	3	5:00
Preliminary Card (WSOF.com)
Welterweight	Abubakar Nurmagomedov	def.	Danny Davis Jr.	Decision (unanimous) (30–27, 30–27, 29–28)	3	5:00
Lightweight	Johnny Nuñez	def.	David Jordan	Decision (unanimous) (30–27, 30–27, 30–26)	3	5:00
Featherweight	Hakeem Dawodu	vs.	Marat Magomedov	Draw (majority) (29–28, 28–28, 28–28)	3	5:00
Lightweight	Gil Guardado	def.	Giga Chikadze	Decision (unanimous) (29–28, 30–27, 30–27)	3	5:00

== See also ==
- List of WSOF champions
- List of WSOF events
