= World Series of Fighting Canada 2: Loiseau vs. Lewis =

World Series of Fighting mixed martial arts event in 2014

World Series of Fighting Canada 2: Loiseau vs Lewis
- Promotion: World Series of Fighting: Canada
- Date: June 7, 2014
- Venue: Edmonton Expo Centre
- City: Edmonton, Alberta, Canada
- Attendance: 3,330

Event chronology
WSOF 9: Carl vs. Palhares	World Series of Fighting Canada 2: Loiseau vs Lewis	WSOF 10: Branch vs. Taylor

World Series of Fighting Canada 2: Loiseau vs Lewis was a mixed martial arts event held June 7, 2014 in Edmonton, Alberta, Canada.

== Background ==
Ryan Ford was scheduled to fight Bristol Marunde at this event for the WSOF Canadian Welterweight Championship. Ford pulled out after getting injured during training.

== Results ==
Main card (GFL.tv)
Weight class				Method	Round	Time	Notes
Light Heavyweight	Dwayne Lewis	def.	David Loiseau	Decision (unanimous) (29–28, 29–28, 30–27)	3	5:00
Bantamweight	Josh Hill	def.	Mike Adams	KO (punch)	1	4:20
Heavyweight	Tim Hague	def.	Matt Baker	TKO (punches)	1	3:56
Welterweight	Spencer Jebb	def.	Matt DesRoches	Decision (unanimous) (30–27, 30–27, 30–27)	3	5:00
Middleweight	Ryan Janes	def.	David Perron	Submission (rear-naked choke)	1	4:23
Preliminary card
Featherweight	Hakeem Dawodu	def.	Jake Macdonald	KO (punches)	2	0:18
Middleweight	Marcus Hicks	def.	Markhaile Wedderburn	Submission (rear-naked choke)	1	1:34
Middleweight	Graham Park	def.	Jordan Murray	TKO (elbows and punches)	1	1:00

== See also ==
- World Series of Fighting
- List of WSOF champions
- List of WSOF events
