= WSOF Global Championship 2: Japan =

World Series of Fighting MMA event in 2016

World Series of Fighting Global Championship 2: Japan
- Promotion: World Series of Fighting Global Championship
- Date: February 7, 2016
- Venue: Tokyo Dome City Hall
- City: Tokyo, Japan

Event chronology
World Series of Fighting 27: Firmino vs. Fodor	World Series of Fighting Global Championship 2: Japan	World Series of Fighting 28: Moraes vs. Barajas

World Series of Fighting Global Championship 2: Japan was a mixed martial arts event held on February 7, 2016 at the Tokyo Dome City Hall in Tokyo, Japan.

== Background ==
The event was headlined by a fight between Evgeny Erokhin and Brandon Cash for the inaugural WSOF GC Heavyweight Championship. Erokhin fought for the belt against Jeremy May in November at WSOF GC: China 1, but the fight ended in a no contest because of an eye poke.

== Results ==
Fight Card
Weight class				Method	Round	Time	Notes
Heavyweight	Evgeny Erokhin	def.	Brandon Cash	TKO (knee injury)	1	1:47	(Note: For the inaugural WSOF-GC Heavyweight Championship.)
Catchweight (159 lb)	Miroslav Strbak	def.	Akihiro Gono	KO (punches)	2	2:42
Featherweight	Michihiro Omigawa	def.	Teddy Violet	Decision (split) (29–28, 28–29, 29–28)	3	5:00
Flyweight	Yusaku Nakamura	def.	Lawrence DiGuilio	Decision (split) (29–28, 28–29, 29–28)	3	5:00
Women's Atomweight	Hisae Watanabe	def.	Lee Ye-ji	TKO (punch)	2	3:00
Preliminary card
Heavyweight	Richard Odoms	def.	Yusuke Kawaguchi	KO (knee)	1	3:29
Featherweight	Kamil Lebkowski	def.	Yoshihiro Koyama	KO (punch)	1	4:15
Bantamweight	Arnold Quero	def.	Taichi Nakajima	Decision (unanimous) (29–27, 29–27, 29–27)	3	5:00
Strawweight	Jarred Brooks	def.	Junji Ito	KO (elbows)	2	3:31
Women's Strawweight	Anna Bezhenar	def.	May Ooi	Decision (unanimous) (29–28, 29–28, 29–28)	3	5:00

== See also ==
- List of WSOF champions
- List of WSOF events
