= World Series of Fighting 14: Ford vs. Shields =

World Series of Fighting mixed martial arts event in 2014

- Promotion: World Series of Fighting
- Date: October 11, 2014
- Venue: Edmonton Expo Centre
- City: Edmonton, Alberta, Canada
- Attendance: 5,000

Event chronology
World Series of Fighting 13: Moraes vs. Bollinger	World Series of Fighting 14: Ford vs. Shields	World Series of Fighting 15: Branch vs. Okami

World Series of Fighting 14: Ford vs. Shields was a mixed martial arts event held October 11, 2014, in Edmonton, Alberta, Canada. This event aired on NBCSN in the US and on TSN2 in Canada.

== Background ==
Ryan Ford faced former Strikeforce Middleweight Champion Jake Shields at this event.

Smealinho Rama and Derrick Mehmen fought for the inaugural WSOF Heavyweight Championship at this event.

Michael Hill was expected to face Marcus Hicks but after Hicks failed to make weight on short notice Hill declined the Catchweight bout which caused the fight to be canceled.

== Results ==
Main card
Weight class				Method	Round	Time	Notes
Welterweight	Jake Shields	def.	Ryan Ford	Submission (rear-naked choke)	1	4:29
Heavyweight	Smealinho Rama	def.	Derrick Mehmen	TKO (punches)	1	0:51	(Note: For the Inaugural WSOF Heavyweight Championship.)
Featherweight	Chris Horodecki	def.	Luis Huete	Decision (unanimous) (30–27, 30–27, 30–27)	3	5:00
Light Heavyweight	Jared Hamman	def.	Luke Harris	TKO (punches)	1	2:27
Preliminary card
Heavyweight	Tim Hague	def.	Craig Hudson	TKO (punches)	3	2:55
Featherweight	Hakeem Dawodu	def.	Mike Malott	TKO (punches and elbows)	1	4:13
Catchweight (195 lb)	Matt Baker	def.	Cody Krahn	Submission (armbar)	1	2:28
Lightweight	Roger Alves	def.	David Swanson	Decision (unanimous) (30–27, 30–27, 30–27)	3	5:00

== See also ==
- World Series of Fighting
- List of WSOF champions
- List of WSOF events
