= World Series of Fighting 15: Branch vs. Okami =

World Series of Fighting mixed martial arts event in 2014

- Promotion: World Series of Fighting
- Date: November 15, 2014
- Venue: USF Sun Dome
- City: Tampa, Florida, United States
- Attendance: 7,000

Event chronology
World Series of Fighting 14: Ford vs. Shields	World Series of Fighting 15: Branch vs. Okami	World Series of Fighting 16: Palhares vs. Fitch

World Series of Fighting 15: Branch vs. Okami was a mixed martial arts event held November 15, 2014 in Tampa, Florida, United States. The event aired on NBCSN in the US and on TSN2 in Canada.

== Background ==
The main event was a fight for the WSOF Middleweight Championship between champion David Branch and challenger Yushin Okami.

The co-main event between Justin Gaethje and Melvin Guillard was originally scheduled to be for the WSOF Lightweight Championship. However, Guillard missed the 155 pound weight allowance for the title fight, weighing 158.8 pounds. As a result, the bout was changed to a non-title catchweight bout with Guillard agreeing to give fifty percent of his purse to Gaethje. In the main event on the preliminary card Maurice Salmon was able to score a TKO victory via doctor stoppage over Javier Torres. Early in the bout Torres complained to the referee about eye pokes, but the bout continued and the two kept the action going. Salmon was able to land a devastating left and a flurry of ground and pound until the bell. After an eye injury the bout stopped in the first round. Salmon told reporters he was displeased with Torres head butting during the weigh-ins.

This event aired against UFC 180 and Bellator 131 making it the first time three major martial arts promotion's air events on the same night.

== Results ==
Main card
Weight class				Method	Round	Time	Notes
Middleweight	David Branch (c)	def.	Yushin Okami	TKO (punches)	4	3:39	(Note: For the WSOF Middleweight Championship.)
Catchweight (159 lbs)	Justin Gaethje	def.	Melvin Guillard	Decision (split) (28–29, 29–28, 30–27)	3	5:00
Women's Strawweight	Jessica Aguilar (c)	def.	Kalindra Faria	Decision (unanimous) (49–45, 49–45, 49–45)	5	5:00	(Note: For the WSOF Women's Strawweight Championship.)
Lightweight	Jorge Patino	def.	Eric Reynolds	Decision (unanimous) (30–27, 30–27, 29–28)	3	5:00
Preliminary card
Catchweight (180 lb)	Maurice Salmon	def.	Javier Torres	TKO (doctor stoppage)	1	5:00
Featherweight	Anderson Hutchinson	def.	Troy Gerhart	Decision (unanimous) (29–28, 29–28, 29–28)	3	5:00
Lightweight	Ryan Keenan	def.	Jose Andres Cortes	Submission (rear-naked choke)	3	2:16
Lightweight	Tony Way	def.	Frederico Moncaio	Submission (guillotine choke)	3	2:03
Middleweight	Hector Ochoa	def.	Robert Reed	Decision (split) (29–28, 28–29, 29–28)	3	5:00
Middleweight	Reggie Pena	def.	Joe Johnson	Submission (rear-naked choke)	1	4:15
Lightweight	Matt Frevola	def.	Josh Zuckerman	Submission (triangle armbar)	1	2:50

== See also ==
- List of WSOF champions
- List of WSOF events
