= Hakeem Dawodu =

Canadian mixed martial artist (born 1991)

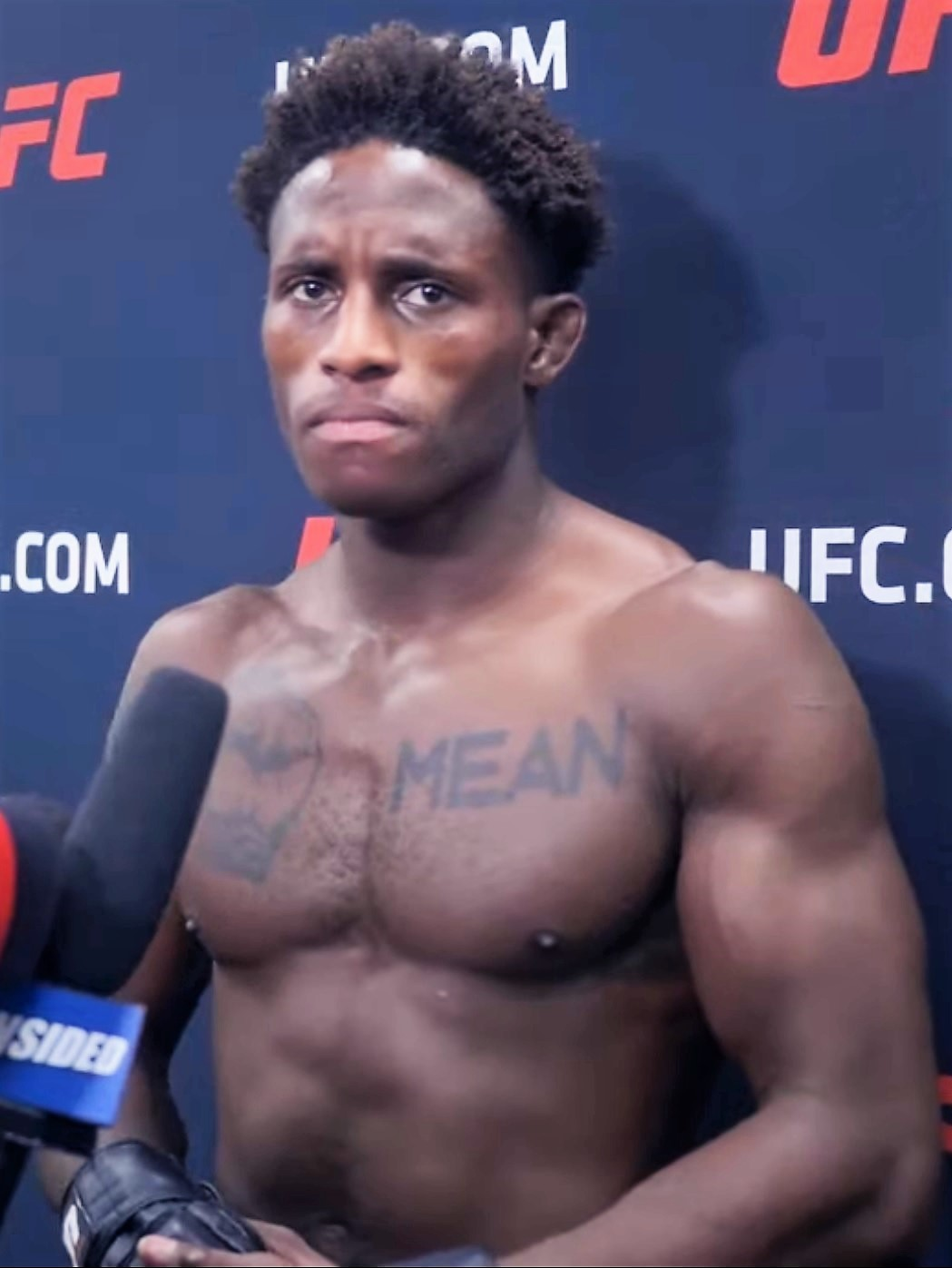
- Hakeem Dawodu at UFC 244
- Born: Hakeem Tyrone Dawodu; July 2, 1991 (age 35); Calgary, Alberta, Canada
- Other names: Mean
- Height: 5 ft 8 in (173 cm)
- Weight: 145 lb (66 kg; 10 st 5 lb)
- Division: Featherweight
- Reach: 73 in (185 cm)
- Style: Muay Thai, Kickboxing
- Fighting out of: Calgary, Alberta, Canada
- Team: Champion's Creed MMA; Mike Miles Kickboxing Team
- Years active: 2014–present

Kickboxing record
- Total: 9
- Wins: 9
- By knockout: 7
- Losses: 0

Mixed martial arts record
- Total: 19
- Wins: 14
- By knockout: 7
- By decision: 7
- Losses: 4
- By submission: 1
- By decision: 3
- Draws: 1

Amateur Muay Thai record
- Total: 47
- Wins: 42
- By knockout: 15
- Losses: 5

Other information
- Mixed martial arts record from Sherdog

Hakeem Tyrone Dawodu (born July 2, 1991) is a Canadian mixed martial artist. He currently competes in the Featherweight division of Unified MMA, where he is the current UMMA Featherweight Champion. He also formerly competed in the Ultimate Fighting Championship and the World Series of Fighting.

== Early life ==
Dawodu was born in Calgary to a mother from Nigeria and a father from Jamaica. When he was six years old, his father was deported, forcing his mother to raise him on her own. He had a troubled childhood; he was first placed in a juvenile detention center at the age of 14. Two years later, his counselor placed him in Muay Thai training as a means of controlling his anger.

== Mixed martial arts career ==
His background is in Muay Thai, where he went 42–5 (15 KOs) as an amateur and 9–0 (7 KOs) as a pro.

=== World Series of Fighting ===
On February 21, 2014, Dawodu made his professional debut at WSOF Canada 1 against Behrang Yousefi. He won the fight via knockout in the first round.

On June 7, 2014, Dawodu faced Jake Macdonald at WSOF Canada 2. He won the fight via knockout in the second round.

On October 11, 2014, Dawodu faced Mike Malott at WSOF 14. He won via technical knockout due to punches and elbows in the first round.

On February 11, 2015, Dawodu faced Tristan Johnson at WSOF 18. He won via technical knockout in the third round.

On June 5, 2015, Dawodu faced Chuka Willis at WSOF 21. He won via technical knockout due to knees and punches in the second round.

On December 18, 2015, Dawodu faced Marat Magomedov at WSOF 26. The fight ended in a majority draw.

On July 30, 2016, Dawodu faced Marat Magomedov at WSOF 32 in a rematch. He won the fight via technical knockout in the second round.

Replacing Alexandre de Almeida, Dawodu faced UFC vet Steven Siler at WSOF 35 March 18, 2017. He won the fight via unanimous decision, this marked the first time he gained victory by decision.

=== Ultimate Fighting Championship ===
On November 11, 2017, it was announced that Dawodu signed a four fight deal with the UFC.

Dawodu faced Danny Henry on March 17, 2018, at UFC Fight Night 127. He lost the fight via submission in the fight's opening minute.

Dawodu faced Austin Arnett on July 28, 2018, at UFC on Fox 30. He won the fight via unanimous decision.

Dawodu faced Kyle Bochniak on December 8, 2018, at UFC 231. Dawodu won the fight via split decision.

Dawodu faced promotional newcomer Yoshinori Horie on July 27, 2019, at UFC 240 He won the fight via knockout in round three. This win earned him the Performance of the Night award.

Dawodu faced Julio Arce on November 2, 2019, at UFC 244. He won the fight by split decision.

Dawodu faced Zubaira Tukhugov on September 27, 2020 at UFC 253. Tukhugov missed weight, and was subsequently fined a percentage of his purse, which will go to Dawodu. Dawodu won by split decision.

As the first bout of his new four-fight contract, Dawodu was expected to face Shane Burgos on January 24, 2021 at UFC 257. However, Dawodu was forced to withdraw from the bout, citing shoulder injury.'

Dawodu faced Movsar Evloev on June 12, 2021, at UFC 263. He lost the fight via unanimous decision.

Dawodu faced Michael Trizano on February 5, 2022, at UFC Fight Night 200. He won the fight via unanimous decision.

Dawodu faced Julian Erosa on September 10, 2022, at UFC 279. At the weigh-ins, Dawodu weighed in at 149.5 pounds, 3.5 pounds over the non-title featherweight limit. Dawodu was fined 30% of his purse, which will go to his opponent Erosa. Dawodu lost the fight via unanimous decision.

Dawodu was scheduled to face Lucas Almeida on June 10, 2023, at UFC 289. However, the bout was scrapped for unknown reasons and Almeida was rebooked for a new fight.

Dawodu faced Cub Swanson on August 12, 2023, at UFC on ESPN: Luque vs. dos Anjos. He lost the fight by unanimous decision.

On June 6, 2025, it was reported that he was released by the UFC.

=== Unified MMA ===
After being released from the UFC, Dawodu signed with Canadian-based promotion Unified MMA. He faced 6-1 prospect, Jake Geauvreau on October 3, 2025, and won the bout by unanimous decision.

== Championships and accomplishments ==
MMA

- Ultimate Fighting Championship
  - Performance of the Night (One time) vs. Yoshinori Horie

Muay Thai & Kickboxing Professional

- World Muaythai Council
  - Intercontinental Welterweight Champion (2014)

Amateur

- International Federation of Muaythai Amateur
  - 2012 IFMA World Cup A-class Tournament (bronze) (-63,5 kg)
  - 2011 IFMA European Cup A-Class (silver) (-63,5 kg)
  - 2010 IFMA World Championship B-class (gold) (-63,5 kg)
- Pan American Muaythai Union
  - Super lightweight Champion (2012)
- International Kickboxing Federation
  - Full Muay Thai Rules Light Welterweight World Champion (2011)
  - 2010 IKF World Classic Muay Thai Rules Welterweight Champion

== Mixed martial arts record ==
Professional record breakdown
19 matches	14 wins	4 losses
By knockout	7	0
By submission	0	1
By decision	7	3
Draws	1	

Res.	Record	Opponent	Method	Event	Date	Round	Time	Location	Notes
Win	14–4–1	Jake Geauvreau	Decision (unanimous)	Unified MMA 64	October 3, 2025	5	5:00	Enoch, Alberta, Canada	Won the vacant Unified MMA Featherweight Championship.
Loss	13–4–1	Cub Swanson	Decision (unanimous)	UFC on ESPN: Luque vs. dos Anjos	August 12, 2023	3	5:00	Las Vegas, Nevada, United States	
Loss	13–3–1	Julian Erosa	Decision (unanimous)	UFC 279	September 10, 2022	3	5:00	Las Vegas, Nevada, United States	Catchweight (149.5 lb) bout; Dawodu missed weight.
Win	13–2–1	Michael Trizano	Decision (unanimous)	UFC Fight Night: Hermansson vs. Strickland	February 5, 2022	3	5:00	Las Vegas, Nevada, United States	
Loss	12–2–1	Movsar Evloev	Decision (unanimous)	UFC 263	June 12, 2021	3	5:00	Glendale, Arizona, United States	
Win	12–1–1	Zubaira Tukhugov	Decision (split)	UFC 253	September 27, 2020	3	5:00	Abu Dhabi, United Arab Emirates	Catchweight (150 lb) bout; Tukhugov missed weight.
Win	11–1–1	Julio Arce	Decision (split)	UFC 244	November 2, 2019	3	5:00	New York City, New York, United States	
Win	10–1–1	Yoshinori Horie	TKO (head kick)	UFC 240	July 27, 2019	3	4:09	Edmonton, Alberta, Canada	Performance of the Night.
Win	9–1–1	Kyle Bochniak	Decision (split)	UFC 231	December 8, 2018	3	5:00	Toronto, Ontario, Canada	
Win	8–1–1	Austin Arnett	Decision (unanimous)	UFC on Fox: Alvarez vs. Poirier 2	July 28, 2018	3	5:00	Calgary, Alberta, Canada	
Loss	7–1–1	Danny Henry	Technical Submission (guillotine choke)	UFC Fight Night: Werdum vs. Volkov	March 17, 2018	1	0:39	London, England	
Win	7–0–1	Steven Siler	Decision (unanimous)	WSOF 35	March 18, 2017	3	5:00	Verona, New York, United States	
Win	6–0–1	Marat Magomedov	TKO (punches)	WSOF 32	July 30, 2016	2	2:03	Everett, Washington, United States	
Draw	5–0–1	Marat Magomedov	Draw (majority)	WSOF 26	December 18, 2015	3	5:00	Las Vegas, Nevada, United States	
Win	5–0	Chuka Willis	TKO (knees and elbows)	WSOF 21	June 5, 2015	2	2:55	Edmonton, Alberta, Canada	
Win	4–0	Tristan Johnson	TKO (punches)	WSOF 18	February 12, 2015	3	1:59	Edmonton, Alberta, Canada	
Win	3–0	Mike Malott	TKO (punches and elbows)	WSOF 14	October 11, 2014	1	4:13	Edmonton, Alberta, Canada	
Win	2–0	Jake Macdonald	KO (punches)	WSOF Canada 2	June 7, 2014	2	0:18	Edmonton, Alberta, Canada	Catchweight (150 lb) bout.
Win	1–0	Behrang Yousefi	KO (punch)	WSOF Canada 1	February 21, 2014	1	1:07	Edmonton, Alberta, Canada	

== Muay Thai and kickboxing record ==
Kickboxing record
9 Wins (7 (T)KO's), 0 Loss, 0 draw
Date	Result	Opponent	Event	Location	Method	Round	Time
2015-01-24	Win	(United Kingdom) Charlie Peters	Canadian Challenger Muay Thai Series 12	Edmonton, Canada	Decision (Unanimous)	5	3:00
2014-04-05	Win	(Thailand) Samsamut Kiatponthip	Canadian Challenger Muay Thai Series 10	Calgary, Canada	Decision (Unanimous)	5	3:00
Wins WMC intercontinental Welterweight title.
2014-01-24	Win	(Japan) Junpei Hirai	WMC Challenger Muay Thai Series 9	Calgary, Canada	KO	1	
2013-11-17	Win	(Thailand) Kongnapa Weerasakreck	M-FIGHT SUK WEERASAKRECK IV	Tokyo, Japan	TKO (Punches)	3	2:36
2013-05-25	Win	(Netherlands) Ryan Wiese	K-1 8-man tournament, final	Port of Spain, Trinidad and Tobago	Decision (Unanimous)	3	3:00
2013-05-25	Win		K-1 8-man tournament, semi-finals	Port of Spain, Trinidad and Tobago	KO	3	
2013-05-25	Win	(Trinidad and Tobago) Davin Sinaswee	K-1 8-man tournament, quarter-finals	Port of Spain, Trinidad and Tobago	KO (Low Kick)	1	
2013-04-19	Win	(United States) Sheldon Gaines	Challenger 7 - 'HEAVY DUTY'	Calgary, Canada	KO	4	
2012-11-24	Win	(Thailand) Rungjaras	Muay Thai Mayhem 3	Edmonton, Canada	KO (Left Hook)	2	
Legend: Win Loss Draw/No contest Notes

Amateur record
42 Wins (15 (T)KO's), 5 Losses, 0 draw
Date	Result	Opponent	Event	Location	Method	Round	Time
2012-10-19	Win	(United States) Omar Estevez	FATE 4 Man Tournament Final Title Bout	Calgary, Canada	Decision (Unanimous)	5	2:00
2012-10-19	Win	(England) Wayne Fisher	FATE 4 Man Tournament Semi Final Bout	Calgary, Canada	Decision (Unanimous)	3	2:00
2012-09-13	Win	(Belarus) Dmitry Varats	IFMA World Championship 2012, -63.5 kg Bronze Medal fight	Saint Petersburg, Russia	Decision	3	3:00
Wins IFMA World Championships 2012 -63.5kg Bronze Medal.
2012-09-11	Loss	(Ukraine) Igor Liubchenko	IFMA World Championships 2012, -63.5 kg Semi Final	Saint Petersburg, Russia	Decision (Split)	3	3:00
2012-09-10	Win	(Afghanistan) Awad Jawid	IFMA World Championships 2012, -63.5 kg Quarter Final	Saint Petersburg, Russia	Decision	3	3:00
2012-09-08	Win	(Poland) Cezary Zugaj	IFMA World Championships 2012, -63.5 kg First Round	Saint Petersburg, Russia	KO	3	
2012-03-10	Win	(Argentina) Sebastian Calvo	Challenger MuayThai Series Challenger 6	Calgary, Canada	Decision (Unanimous)	5	2:00
Wins PAMU Sperlightweight title.
2012-01-28	Win	(Thailand) Parnpetch Petchtalingarm	Challenger 3 – JAWBREAKER	Calgary, Canada	Decision (Split)	5	2:00
2011-12-03	Win	(Canada) Alex Tribe	K-1 last man standing 8-man tournament, final	Victoria, British Columbia, Canada	TKO	2	
2011-12-03	Win	(Canada) Josh Jauncey	K-1 last man standing 8-man tournament, semi-final	Victoria, British Columbia, Canada	Decision (Majority)	3	2:00
2011-12-03	Win	(Canada) Josh Wright	K-1 last man standing 8-man tournament, quarter-final	Victoria, British Columbia, Canada	TKO	1	
2011-11-25	Win	(China) Feng Jie		Vancouver, Canada	Decision	3	2:00
2011-09-17	Win	(Thailand) Tanuthong	Challenger 2 – EXPLOSION	Calgary, Canada	Decision	5	2:00
2011-04-23	Win	(Japan) Ryo Takagi	"CHALLENGER 1 -CONCUSSION"	Calgary, Canada	TKO (Knee)	2	
Wins IKF Full MuayThai Rules Light Welterweight World title.
2011-03-12	Loss	(Belarus) Aganes Safaryan	IFMA European Cup, -63.5 kg Final	Dresden, Germany	Decision (Split)	3	
Wins IFMA European Cup -63.5kg Silver Medal.
2011-03-12	Win	(Denmark) Steffen Weise	IFMA European Cup, -63.5 kg Semi Final	Dresden, Germany	Decision	3	
2011-03-11	Win	(Ukraine) Yevgen Trofymov	IFMA European Cup, -63.5 kg Quarter Final	Dresden, Germany	Decision	3	
2011-02-04	Win	(United Kingdom) Karl Pearson	Ringmasters	Calgary, Canada	TKO (Corner Stoppage)	3	
2010-12-04	Win	(Morocco) Soufiane Taaouati	IFMA World Championship 2010, final	Bangkok, Thailand	Decision (Unanimous)	3	3:00
Wins 2010 IFMA World Championships B-class -63.5kg Gold Medal.
2010-12-03	Win	(Belarus) Ramil Novruzov	IFMA World Championship 2010, semi-final	Bangkok, Thailand	Decision (Unanimous)	3	3:00
2010-12-01	Win	(Latvia) Kaplan Abukov	IFMA World Championship 2010, quarter-final	Bangkok, Thailand	Decision (Unanimous)	3	3:00
2010-11-30	Win	(New Zealand) Willie Rewi	IFMA World Championship 2010, second round	Bangkok, Thailand	Decision (Unanimous)	3	3:00
2010-11-28	Win	(China) Zhang Dezheng	IFMA World Championship 2010, first round	Bangkok, Thailand	Decision (Unanimous)	3	3:00
2010-07-24	Win	(United States) Corey Springer	2010 IKF World Classic, final	Orlando, Florida, United States	TKO	2	1:58
Wins IKF World Classic MuayThai Rules Welterweight title.
2010-07-24	Win	(United States) Joshua Hill	2010 IKF World Classic, semi-final	Orlando, Florida, United States	TKO	2	1:24
2010-07-23	Win	(United States) Trevor Morgan	2010 IKF World Classic, quarter-final	Orlando, Florida, United States	Decision (Unanimous)	2	2:00
2010-07-23	Win	(United States) Lance Garza	2010 IKF World Classic, preliminary round	Orlando, Florida, United States	TKO	1	1:03
Legend: Win Loss Draw/No contest Notes

== See also ==
- List of Canadian UFC fighters
- List of male mixed martial artists
