= World Series of Fighting 9: Carl vs. Palhares =

World Series of Fighting MMA event in 2014

- Promotion: World Series of Fighting
- Date: March 29, 2014
- Venue: Hard Rock Hotel & Casino
- City: Paradise, Nevada, United States
- Attendance: 995

Event chronology
World Series of Fighting Canada 1: Ford vs. Powell	World Series of Fighting 9: Carl vs. Palhares	World Series of Fighting Canada 2: Loiseau vs Lewis

World Series of Fighting 9: Carl vs. Palhares was a mixed martial arts event held March 29, 2014 in Paradise, Nevada, United States.

== Background ==
This event was headlined by reigning Welterweight Champion Steve Carl making the first title defense of his career. Taking Carl will be former UFC vet Rousimar Palhares, who fought for the first time since his release from the UFC in October 2013.

The inaugural Bantamweight Championship was decided in the co-main event which featured Marlon Moraes taking on Josh Rettinghouse. Moraes was coming off a 32-second knockout over Carson Beebe at WSOF 6. Rettinghouse came off his decision victory over Bellator MMA veteran Alexis Vila.

Also on the card, making his first appearance since his release from the UFC, Yushin Okami took on Bulgarian fighter Svetlozar Savov in his WSOF debut, winning the fight by Submission (arm triangle choke) in the second round.

== Results ==
Main Card (NBC Sports)
Weight class				Method	Round	Time	Notes
Welterweight	Rousimar Palhares	def.	Steve Carl (c)	Submission (inverted heel hook)	1	1:09	(Note: For the WSOF Welterweight Championship.)
Bantamweight	Marlon Moraes	def.	Josh Rettinghouse	Decision (unanimous) (50–44, 50–44, 50–44)	5	5:00	(Note: For the inaugural WSOF Bantamweight Championship.)
Middleweight	Yushin Okami	def.	Svetlozar Savov	Submission (arm-triangle choke)	2	4:46
Welterweight	Josh Burkman	def.	Tyler Stinson	KO (punch)	1	2:15
Lightweight	Johnny Nuñez	def.	Ozzy Dugulubgov	Decision (split) (28–29, 30–27, 29–28)	3	5:00
Preliminary card
Featherweight	Mike Corey	def.	Shane Kruchten	Submission (rear-naked choke)	2	2:59
Bantamweight	Bryson Hansen	def.	Sean Cantor	TKO (punches)	1	0:46
Featherweight	Chris Gruetzemacher	def.	John Gunderson	Decision (unanimous) (30–27, 30–27, 30–26)	3	5:00
Featherweight	Brenson Hansen	def.	Boostayre Nefarios	Decision (unanimous) (30–27, 30–27, 29–28)	3	5:00
Welterweight	Danny Davis Jr.	def.	Phil Dace	Decision (unanimous) (30–27, 30–27, 30–27)	3	5:00
Lightweight	Jimmy Spicuzza	def.	Gil Guardado	Submission (rear-naked choke)	1	3:14

== See also ==
- World Series of Fighting
- List of WSOF champions
- List of WSOF events
