= PFL Africa 3 (2025) =

Professional Fighters League MMA event in 2025

- The poster for PFL Africa 3
- Promotion: Professional Fighters League
- Date: October 18, 2025
- Venue: BK Arena
- City: Kigali, Rwanda

Event chronology
PFL Champions Series 3	PFL Africa 3	PFL MENA 4

2025 PFL Africa 3: Rwanda was a mixed martial arts event produced by the Professional Fighters League that took place on October 18, 2025, at the BK Arena in Kigali, Rwanda.

== Background ==
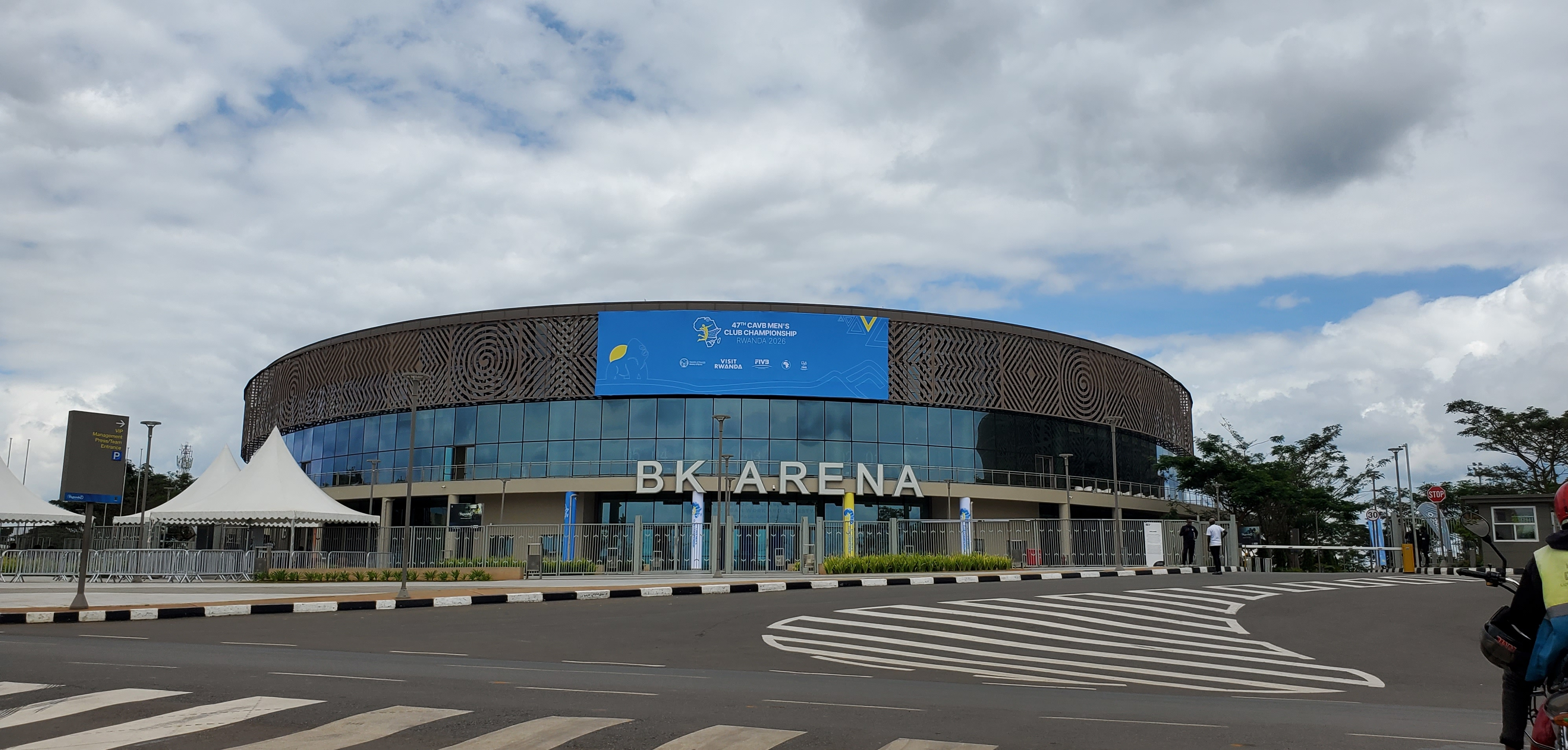
The BK Arena hosted the promotion's debut in Rwanda, which became the 15th country to hold a PFL and WSOF event.

The event was featured the semifinals of the 2025 PFL Africa Tournament in a heavyweight, welterweight, featherweight and bantamweight divisions.

At the weigh-ins, the semifinal fight between Patrick Ocheme and Abdul Razak Sankara were both fighters missed weight of the featherweight limit when Ocheme came in at 156.2 lb and Sankara at 151 lb and the bout proceeded to catchweight showcase bout. Therefore, Mohamed Camara vs. Alain Majorique got took its place in the tournament.

In addition, Karim Henniène weighed in at 137.2 pounds, 1.2 pounds over the bantamweight limit and Wasi Adeshina weighed in at 148 pounds, 2 pounds over the featherweight limit. Henniène and Adeshina have been fined 20% of his purse, which went to Boule Godogo and Dwight Joseph respectively.

== Results ==
Main card (DAZN / PFL App)
Weight class				Method	Round	Time	Notes
Bantamweight	Nkosi Ndebele	def.	Simbarashe Hokonya	Decision (split) (27–30, 29–28, 29–28)	3	5:00	(Note: 2025 PFL Africa Bantamweight Tournament Semifinal.)
Welterweight	Shido Boris Esperança	def.	Ayinda Octave	TKO (punches)	1	3:46	(Note: 2025 PFL Africa Welterweight Tournament Semifinal.)
Heavyweight	Justin Clarke	def.	Maxwell Djantou Nana	TKO (retirement)	3	3:09	(Note: 2025 PFL Africa Heavyweight Tournament Semifinal.)
Catchweight (157 lb)	Patrick Ocheme	def.	Abdul Razak Sankara	Decision (split) (29–28, 28–29, 29–28)	3	5:00
Preliminary card (DAZN / PFL App)
Heavyweight	Abraham Bably	def.	Joffie Houlton	TKO (punches)	1	4:08	(Note: 2025 PFL Africa Heavyweight Tournament Semifinal.)
Bantamweight	Karim Henniène	def.	Boule Godogo	KO (flying knee)	3	4:21	(Note: 2025 PFL Africa Bantamweight Tournament Semifinal; Henniène missed weight (137.2 lb).)
Welterweight	Yabna N'Tchalá	def.	Emilios Dassi	Decision (unanimous) (29–28, 29–28, 29–28)	3	5:00	(Note: 2025 PFL Africa Welterweight Tournament Semifinal.)
Featherweight	Wasi Adeshina	def.	Dwight Joseph	Decision (unanimous) (30–27, 30–27, 30–27)	3	5:00	(Note: 2025 PFL Africa Featherweight Tournament Semifinal; Adeshina missed weight (148 lb).)
Featherweight	James Simon Opio	vs.	Isaac Omeda	Draw (unanimous) (28–28, 28–28, 28–28)	3	5:00	(Note: Omeda was deducted one point in round 3 due to repeated grabbing the fence.)
Heavyweight	Abdoullah Kane	def.	Emmanuel Mukam	KO (head kick)	1	0:23	(Note: 2025 PFL Africa Heavyweight Tournament Alternate bout.)
Featherweight	Alain Majorique	def.	Mohamed Camara	Decision (unanimous) (30–27, 30–27, 29–28)	3	5:00	(Note: 2025 PFL Africa Featherweight Tournament Semifinal.)

== Tournament brackets ==
=== 2025 PFL Africa Heavyweight Tournament ===
Quarter-finals
(Ivory Coast) Paul-Emmanuel Gnaze (Note: Badr Medkouri withdrew from the tournament and was replaced by Paul-Emmanuel Gnaze.)	1
(Ivory Coast) Abraham Bably	KO
(Nigeria) Joffie Houlton (Note: Mohammad Ben Yahia withdrew from the tournament due to an injury and was replaced by Joffie Houlton.)	DQ
(Senegal) Abdoullah Kane	1
(Cameroon) Maxwell Djantou Nana	UD
(Ivory Coast) Mickaël Groguhe	3
(South Africa) Justin Clarke	TKO
(Cameroon) Jashell Ticha Awa	1

Semi-finals
(Ivory Coast) Abraham Bably	TKO
(Nigeria) Joffie Houlton	1
(Cameroon) Maxwell Djantou Nana	3
(South Africa) Justin Clarke	TKO

Final
(Ivory Coast) Abraham Bably
(South Africa) Justin Clarke

=== 2025 PFL Africa Welterweight Tournament ===
Quarter-finals
(Angola) Shido Boris Esperanca	SUB
(The Gambia) Ibrahima Mané	1
(Democratic Republic of the Congo) British Boloyoang	1
(Cameroon) Ayinda Octave	TKO
(Burkina Faso) Sanon Sadeck	3
(Guinea-Bissau) Yabna N'Tchalá	UD
(Angola) Osvaldo Benedito	1
(Cameroon) Emilios Dassi	KO

Semi-finals
(Angola) Shido Boris Esperanca	SUB
(Cameroon) Ayinda Octave	1
(Guinea-Bissau) Yabna N'Tchalá	UD
(Cameroon) Emilios Dassi	3

Final
(Angola) Shido Boris Esperanca
(Guinea-Bissau) Yabna N'Tchalá

=== 2025 PFL Africa Featherweight Tournament ===
Quarter-finals
(Nigeria) Patrick Ocheme	DEC
(Guinea) Mohamed Camara	3
(Burkina Faso) Abdul Razak Sankara	KO
(Democratic Republic of the Congo) Shadrick Dju Yemba (Note: The bout was originally scheduled as Abderrahman Errachidy vs. Elbert Lukas Steyn, but both fighters missed weight and were replaced by alternate bout between Abdul Razak Sankara vs. Shadrick Dju Yemba.)	1
(Nigeria) Wasi Adeshina	SUB
(Democratic Republic of the Congo) Jean-Jacques Lubaya	2
(Angola) Wilker Nsamo	2
(Liberia) Dwight Joseph	KO

Semi-finals
(Guinea) Mohamed Camara	3
(Cameroon) Alain Majorique (Note: The bout was originally scheduled as Patrick Ocheme vs. Abdul Razak Sankara, but both fighters missed weight and were replaced by alternate bout between Mohamed Camara vs. Alain Majorique.)	UD
(Nigeria) Wasi Adeshina	UD
(Liberia) Dwight Joseph	3

Final
(Cameroon) Alain Majorique
(Nigeria) Wasi Adeshina

=== 2025 PFL Africa Bantamweight Tournament ===
Quarter-finals
(South Africa) Nkosi Ndebele	TKO
(Egypt) Mahmoud Atef	1
(South Africa) Frans Mlambo (Note: Alain Majorique withdrew from the tournament and was replaced by Frans Mlambo.)	3
(Zimbabwe) Simbarashe Hokonya	UD
(South Africa) Shannon van Tonder	3
(Angola) Boule Godogo	SD
(South Africa) Asiashu Tshitamba (Note: Antero dos Santos withdrew from the tournament and was replaced by Asiashu Tshitamba.)	3
(Algeria) Karim Henniene	SD

Semi-finals
(South Africa) Nkosi Ndebele	SD
(Zimbabwe) Simbarashe Hokonya	3
(Angola) Boule Godogo	3
(Algeria) Karim Henniene	KO

Final
(South Africa) Nkosi Ndebele
(Algeria) Karim Henniene

== See also ==
- 2025 in Professional Fighters League
- List of PFL events
- List of current PFL fighters
