= Josh Hill (fighter) =

Canadian mixed martial artist

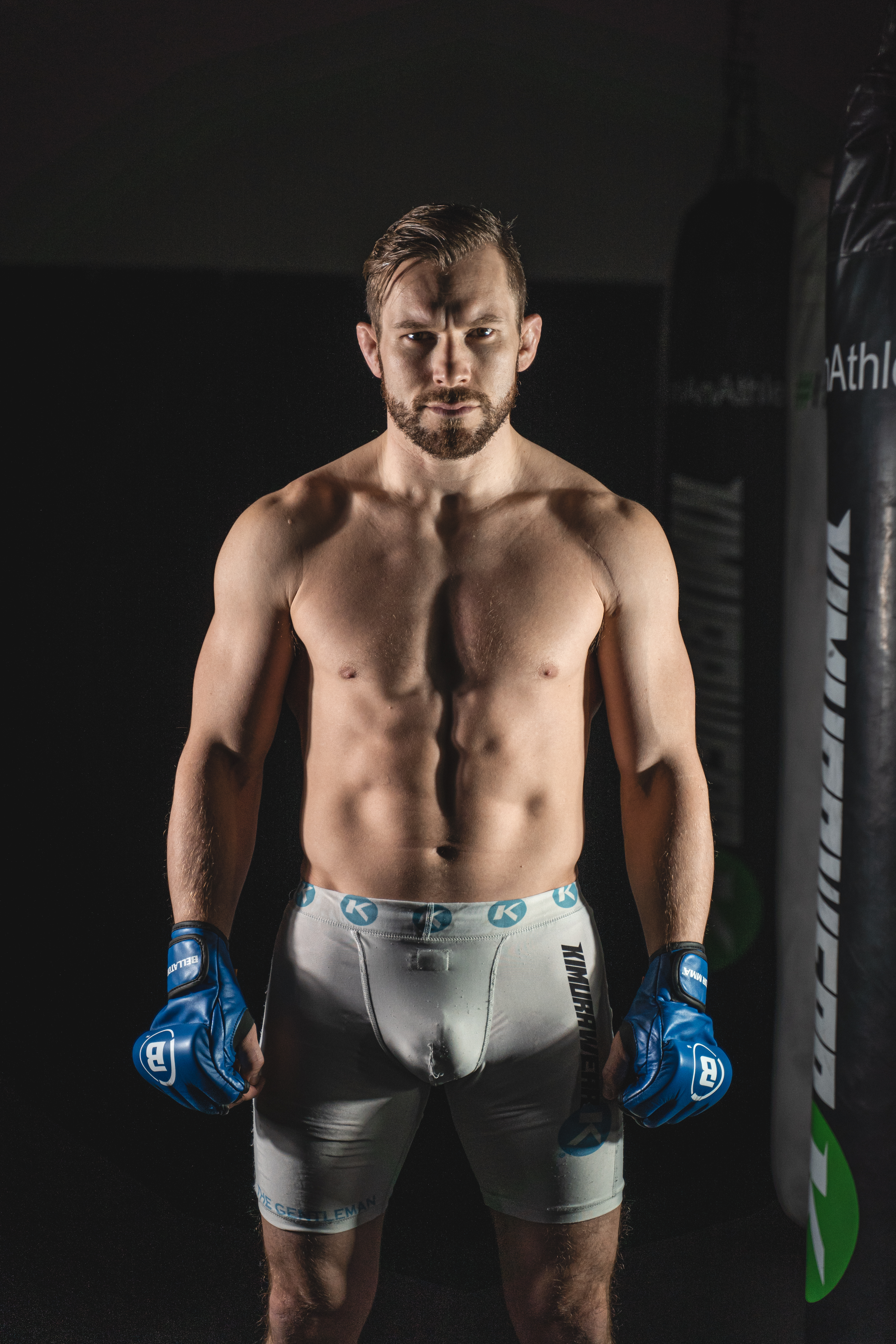
- Born: Joshua Hill; November 24, 1986 (age 39); Hamilton, Ontario, Canada
- Other names: Gentleman
- Height: 5 ft 6 in (1.68 m)
- Weight: 137 lb (62 kg; 9 st 11 lb)
- Division: Bantamweight
- Reach: 66 1/2 in (169 cm)
- Fighting out of: Stoney Creek, Ontario
- Team: Aegis MMA; House of Champions
- Rank: Brown belt in Brazilian Jiu-Jitsu
- Years active: 2009–present

Mixed martial arts record
- Total: 31
- Wins: 23
- By knockout: 6
- By submission: 4
- By decision: 13
- Losses: 8
- By knockout: 1
- By decision: 7

Other information
- Mixed martial arts record from Sherdog

Josh Hill (born November 24, 1986) is a Canadian mixed martial artist who competes in the Bantamweight division of Oktagon MMA. Hill competed for such promotions as Bellator MMA, the World Series of Fighting (WSOF), Real Xtreme Fighting (RXF), and TKO Major League MMA. Hill also appeared on Season 18 of The Ultimate Fighter.

== Background ==
Hill was born in Hamilton, Ontario, Canada. He started training martial arts at age 20 and took his first professional MMA fight three years later.

== Mixed martial arts career ==
=== Regional MMA ===
Josh Hill took his first fight on two weeks notice and won by second-round TKO.

His fifth pro fight was for the Aggression MMA Bantamweight title. He won the championship with a unanimous decision victory over then undefeated Diego Wilson (5-0).

=== The Ultimate Fighter ===
Starting his career undefeated, with 8 professional wins, Hill was accepted onto Season 18 of The Ultimate Fighter with Ronda Rousey and Miesha Tate.

The first episode of the show featured an elimination bout to get into the fighter house. Hill earned his place in the house by winning a majority decision over Patrick Holohan. He lost his quarterfinal bout by unanimous decision to Mike Wooten and was eliminated from the tournament.

=== World Series of Fighting ===
Josh Hill signed with the World Series of Fighting and made his debut at WSOF Canada 2 against Mike Adams on June 7, 2014 in Edmonton, Alberta. He won the fight via knockout in the first round.

In his next fight for the promotion, Hill faced Marlon Moraes for the WSOF Bantamweight Championship on February 12, 2015 in the main event at WSOF 18: Moraes vs Hill. He lost the fight via unanimous decision (49-46, 49-46, 49-46).

After two fights outside of WSOF Hill returned at WSOF 26 to defeat Bekbulat Magomedov via split decision.

Hill earned a second shot against Marlon Moraes for the WSOF Bantamweight Championship on July 30, 2016 in the main event at WSOF 32: Moraes vs. Hill 2. He lost the fight via TKO in the second round.

=== Bellator MMA ===
Josh Hill signed with Bellator MMA in November 2019. His debut fight came against Vinicius Zani at Bellator 239 on February 21, 2020. He won the fight via unanimous decision.

Hill faced UFC veteran Erik Pérez at Bellator 244 on August 21, 2020. He won the fight via unanimous decision.

Hill faced Raufeon Stots at Bellator 258 on May 7, 2021. He lost the bout via unanimous decision.

Hill faced Jared Scoggins on December 3, 2021 at Bellator 272. At the weigh-ins, Jared Scoggins missed weight for his bout, weighing in at 140 pounds, 4 pounds over the bantamweight non-title fight limit. The bout proceeded at catchweight and Scoggins was fined 35% of his purse which went to Hill. Hill would go on to win the fight via KO at 0:56 of round 2.

Hill was scheduled to face Enrique Barzola on April 22, 2022 at Bellator 278. Due to the pull out of two fighters from the Bellator Bantamweight World Grand Prix due to injuries, the bout was changed to a wild card qualifier for one of the spots in the tournament. Due to Covid, Hill had to pull out of the bout.

Hill was scheduled to face Matheus Mattos at Bellator 284 on August 12, 2022. However, Mattos pulled out due to a knee injury requiring knee surgery and was replaced by Marcos Breno. Hill lost the bout via unanimous decision.

Hill faced Cass Bell on March 10, 2023 at Bellator 292. At the weigh-ins, Cass Bell weighed in at 145.2 pounds, 9.2 pounds over the non-title bantamweight fight limit. The bout proceeded at catchweight with Bell being fined 50% of his purse, which went to Hill. Hill won the fight via split decision.

On January 23, 2024, he announced that he was no longer with the promotion.

=== Oktagon MMA ===
Signing with Oktagon MMA, Hill faced Jonas Mågård on July 20, 2024 at Oktagon 59, losing via unanimous decision.

== Personal life ==
Josh was a volunteer firefighter before opening his gym and becoming a fulltime fighter.

Hill does color commentary for BTC Fight Promotions.

== Championships and accomplishments ==
=== Mixed martial arts ===
- Aggression MMA
  - Aggression MMA Bantamweight Championship (One time)

== Mixed martial arts record ==
Professional record breakdown
31 matches	23 wins	8 losses
By knockout	6	1
By submission	4	0
By decision	13	7

Res.	Record	Opponent	Method	Event	Date	Round	Time	Location	Notes
Loss	23–8	Miljan Zdravković	Decision (unanimous)	FNC 26	December 20, 2025	5	5:00	Podgorica, Montenegro	For the FNC Bantamweight Championship.
Win	23–7	Edson Lourenço	TKO (doctor stoppage)	BTC 34	November 8, 2025	3	4:10	Hamilton, Ontario, Canada	
Loss	22–7	Jonas Mågård	Decision (unanimous)	Oktagon 59	July 20, 2024	3	5:00	Bratislava, Slovakia	
Loss	22–6	Kasum Kasumov	Decision (split)	Bellator 298	August 11, 2023	3	5:00	Sioux Falls, South Dakota, United States	
Win	22–5	Cass Bell	Decision (split)	Bellator 292	March 10, 2023	3	5:00	San Jose, California, United States	Catchweight (146 lb) bout; Bell missed weight.
Loss	21–5	Marcos Breno	Decision (unanimous)	Bellator 284	August 12, 2022	3	5:00	Sioux Falls, South Dakota, United States	
Win	21–4	Jared Scoggins	KO (punch)	Bellator 272	December 3, 2021	2	0:56	Uncasville, Connecticut, United States	Catchweight (140 lb) bout; Scoggins missed weight.
Loss	20–4	Raufeon Stots	Decision (unanimous)	Bellator 258	May 7, 2021	3	5:00	Uncasville, Connecticut, United States	
Win	20–3	Erik Pérez	Decision (unanimous)	Bellator 244	August 21, 2020	3	5:00	Uncasville, Connecticut, United States	
Win	19–3	Vinicius Zani	Decision (unanimous)	Bellator 239	February 21, 2020	3	5:00	Thackerville, Oklahoma, United States	
Win	18–3	Gilberto Aguilar	Submission (rear naked choke)	Z Promotions: Fight Night 11	September 28, 2019	1	2:38	Lethbridge, Alberta, Canada	
Win	17–3	Jesse Arnett	KO (punches)	TKO 48	May 24, 2019	2	2:11	Gatineau, Quebec, Canada	
Loss	16–3	Taylor Lapilus	Decision (split)	TKO 45	December 7, 2018	3	5:00	Montreal, Quebec, Canada	
Win	16–2	Grachik Engibaryan	Submission (rear naked choke)	Fight Nights Global 72	August 24, 2017	1	4:12	Sochi, Russia	
Win	15–2	Xavier Alaoui	Decision (split)	TKO 36	November 4, 2016	3	5:00	Montreal, Quebec, Canada	
Loss	14–2	Marlon Moraes	KO (head kick and punches)	WSOF 32	July 30, 2016	2	0:38	Everett, Washington, United States	For the WSOF Bantamweight Championship.
Win	14–1	Bendy Casimir	Decision (unanimous)	Z Promotions: Fight Night 1	April 9, 2016	3	5:00	Medicine Hat, Alberta, Canada	
Win	13–1	Bekbulat Magomedov	Decision (split)	WSOF 26	December 18, 2015	3	5:00	Las Vegas, Nevada, United States	Return to Bantamweight.
Win	12–1	Ioan Vrânceanu	Decision (unanimous)	Romanian Xtreme Fighting 19	August 31, 2015	3	5:00	Galați, Romania	Featherweight debut.
Win	11–1	Josh Rettinghouse	Submission (rear naked choke)	Global Warriors FC 2	May 30, 2015	3	2:01	Burlington, Ontario, Canada	
Loss	10–1	Marlon Moraes	Decision (unanimous)	WSOF 18	February 12, 2015	5	5:00	Edmonton, Alberta, Canada	For the WSOF Bantamweight Championship.
Win	10–0	Mike Adams	KO (punch)	WSOF Canada 2	June 7, 2014	1	4:20	Edmonton, Alberta, Canada	
Win	9–0	John Fraser	Decision (unanimous)	Score Fighting Series 5	August 25, 2012	3	5:00	Hamilton, Ontario, Canada	
Win	8–0	Eric Wilson	Decision (unanimous)	Score Fighting Series 4	March 16, 2012	3	5:00	Hamilton, Ontario, Canada	
Win	7–0	Federico Lopez	Decision (unanimous)	Global Warriors FC 1	August 13, 2011	3	5:00	Hamilton, Ontario, Canada	
Win	6–0	Darin Cooley	Decision (unanimous)	Score Fighting Series 1	June 10, 2011	3	5:00	Mississauga, Ontario, Canada	Catchweight (140 lb) bout.
Win	5–0	Diego Wilson	Decision (unanimous)	Aggression MMA 6	March 11, 2011	3	5:00	Edmonton, Alberta, Canada	Won the inaugural Aggression Bantamweight Championship.
Win	4–0	Brent Franczuz	Submission (rear naked choke)	Warrior-1 MMA 5	June 19, 2010	3	4:00	Montreal, Quebec, Canada	
Win	3–0	Dennis Gagne	TKO (punches)	Warrior-1 MMA 4	March 20, 2010	3	5:00	Montreal, Quebec, Canada	
Win	2–0	Randy Turner	Decision (unanimous)	Wreck MMA: Fight for the Troops	December 12, 2009	3	5:00	Gatineau, Quebec, Canada	
Win	1–0	Vito Attanasi	TKO (punches)	Warrior-1 MMA 3	October 10, 2009	2	1:42	Gatineau, Quebec, Canada	Bantamweight debut.

== See also ==
- List of male mixed martial artists
- List of Bellator MMA alumni
