= List of Professional Fighters League events =

This is a list of events held and scheduled by the Professional Fighters League, a mixed martial arts organization based in the United States. This list also includes events by the league's predecessor, the World Series of Fighting (WSOF).

== Scheduled events ==
Event	Date	Venue	Location
PFL Lyon: Lapilus vs. McKee	December 19, 2026	LDLC Arena	Décines-Charpieu, France
PFL Africa 4	December 12, 2026	BK Arena	Kigali, Rwanda
PFL MENA 12	December 11, 2026	Dhahran Expo	Al Khobar, Saudi Arabia

== Past events ==
=== PFL events ===
#	Event	Date	Venue	Location
122	PFL Dubai: Nemkov vs. Bilostenniy	November 14, 2026	Coca-Cola Arena	Dubai, United Arab Emirates
121	PFL Chicago: Carmouche vs. Bishop 2	October 16, 2026	Wintrust Arena	Chicago, Illinois, U.S.
120	PFL Africa 3	October 10, 2026	Mohammed V Sports Complex	Casablanca, Morocco
119	PFL MENA 11	October 2, 2026	Boulevard City	Riyadh, Saudi Arabia
118	PFL Tampa: Cyborg vs. Vieira	August 22, 2026	Benchmark International Arena	Tampa, Florida, U.S.
117	PFL Charlotte: Battle vs. Rosta	August 7, 2026	Bojangles Coliseum	Charlotte, North Carolina, U.S.
116	PFL New York: Nurmagomedov vs. Colgan	July 31, 2026	UBS Arena	Elmont, New York, U.S.
115	PFL Washington DC: Jean vs. Rodriguez	July 25, 2026	CareFirst Arena	Washington, D.C., U.S.
114	PFL Austin: Eblen vs. Kasanganay 2	July 18, 2026	Moody Center	Austin, Texas, U.S.
113	PFL MENA 10	July 10, 2026	Boulevard City	Riyadh, Saudi Arabia
112	PFL San Diego: McKee vs. Isbulaev	June 27, 2026	Pechanga Arena	San Diego, California, U.S.
111	PFL Africa 2	June 13, 2026	Eko Convention Center	Lagos, Nigeria
110	PFL MENA 9	May 24, 2026	Coca-Cola Arena	Dubai, United Arab Emirates
109	PFL Brussels: Habirora vs. Henderson	May 23, 2026	ING Arena	Brussels, Belgium
108	PFL Sioux Falls: Storley vs. Zendeli	May 2, 2026	Sanford Pentagon	Sioux Falls, South Dakota, U.S.
107	PFL Belfast: Kelly vs. Wilson	April 16, 2026	SSE Arena	Belfast, Northern Ireland
106	PFL Chicago: Pettis vs. McKee	April 11, 2026	Wintrust Arena	Chicago, Illinois, U.S.
105	PFL Africa 1	April 10, 2026	SunBet Arena	Pretoria, South Africa
104	PFL Pittsburgh: Eblen vs. Battle	March 28, 2026	UPMC Events Center	Moon Township, Pennsylvania, U.S.
103	PFL Madrid: van Steenis vs. Edwards 2	March 20, 2026	Palacio Vistalegre	Madrid, Spain
102	PFL Dubai: Nurmagomedov vs. Davis	February 7, 2026	Coca-Cola Arena	Dubai, United Arab Emirates
101	PFL Africa 4	December 20, 2025	Sofitel Dome	Cotonou, Benin
100	PFL Champions Series 4	December 13, 2025	LDLC Arena	Lyon, France
99	PFL MENA 4	December 5, 2025	Dhahran Expo	Khobar, Saudi Arabia
98	PFL Africa 3	October 18, 2025	BK Arena	Kigali, Rwanda
97	PFL Champions Series 3	October 3, 2025	Coca-Cola Arena	Dubai, United Arab Emirates
96	PFL MENA 3	September 27, 2025	The Arena Riyadh Venue for Exhibitions	Riyadh, Saudi Arabia
95	PFL Europe 3	September 26, 2025	Zénith Nantes Métropole	Nantes, France
94	PFL 10	August 21, 2025	Seminole Hard Rock Hotel & Casino Hollywood	Hollywood, Florida, U.S.
93	PFL 9	August 15, 2025	Bojangles Coliseum	Charlotte, North Carolina, U.S.
92	PFL Africa 2	August 9, 2025	Big Top Arena	Johannesburg, South Africa
91	PFL 8	August 1, 2025	Boardwalk Hall	Atlantic City, New Jersey, U.S.
90	PFL Champions Series 2	July 19, 2025	GrandWest Arena	Cape Town, South Africa
89	PFL Europe 2	July 5, 2025	ING Arena	Brussels, Belgium
88	PFL MENA 2	July 4, 2025	The Green Halls	Riyadh, Saudi Arabia
87	PFL 7	June 27, 2025	Wintrust Arena	Chicago, Illinois, U.S.
86	PFL 6	June 20, 2025	Intrust Bank Arena	Wichita, Kansas, U.S.
85	PFL 5	June 12, 2025	Nashville Municipal Auditorium	Nashville, Tennessee, U.S.
84	PFL Europe 1	May 10, 2025	SSE Arena	Belfast, Northern Ireland
83	PFL MENA 1	May 9, 2025	Onyx Arena	Jeddah, Saudi Arabia
82	PFL 4	May 1, 2025	Universal Studios Florida	Orlando, Florida, U.S.
81	PFL 3	April 18, 2025	Universal Studios Florida	Orlando, Florida, U.S.
80	PFL 2	April 11, 2025	Universal Studios Florida	Orlando, Florida, U.S.
79	PFL 1	April 3, 2025	Universal Studios Florida	Orlando, Florida, U.S.
78	PFL Champions Series 1	January 25, 2025	Coca-Cola Arena	Dubai, United Arab Emirates
77	PFL Europe 4	December 14, 2024	LDLC Arena	Lyon, France
76	PFL 10	November 29, 2024	King Saud University Stadium	Riyadh, Saudi Arabia
75	PFL Super Fights: Battle of the Giants	October 19, 2024	The Mayadeen	Riyadh, Saudi Arabia
74	PFL Europe 3	September 28, 2024	OVO Hydro	Glasgow, Scotland, U.K.
73	PFL MENA 3	September 20, 2024	PFL MENA Studio, Boulevard City	Riyadh, Saudi Arabia
72	PFL 9	August 23, 2024	The Anthem	Washington, D.C., U.S.
71	PFL 8	August 16, 2024	Seminole Hard Rock Hotel & Casino Hollywood	Hollywood, Florida, U.S.
70	PFL 7	August 2, 2024	Nashville Municipal Auditorium	Nashville, Tennessee, U.S.
69	PFL MENA 2	July 12, 2024	The Green Halls	Riyadh, Saudi Arabia
68	PFL 6	June 28, 2024	Sanford Pentagon	Sioux Falls, South Dakota, U.S.
67	PFL 5	June 21, 2024	Jon M. Huntsman Center	Salt Lake City, Utah, U.S.
66	PFL 4	June 13, 2024	Mohegan Sun Arena	Uncasville, Connecticut, U.S.
65	PFL Europe 2	June 8, 2024	Newcastle Arena	Newcastle, England, U.K.
64	PFL MENA 1	May 10, 2024	The Green Halls	Riyadh, Saudi Arabia
63	PFL 3	April 19, 2024	Wintrust Arena	Chicago, Illinois, U.S.
62	PFL 2	April 12, 2024	The Theater at Virgin Hotels	Las Vegas, Nevada, U.S.
61	PFL 1	April 4, 2024	Boeing Center at Tech Port	San Antonio, Texas, U.S.
60	PFL Europe 1	March 7, 2024	Accor Arena	Paris, France
59	PFL vs. Bellator	February 24, 2024	Kingdom Arena	Riyadh, Saudi Arabia
58	PFL Europe 4	December 8, 2023	3Arena	Dublin, Ireland
57	PFL 10	November 24, 2023	The Anthem	Washington, D.C., U.S.
56	PFL Europe 3	September 30, 2023	Zénith Paris	Paris, France
55	PFL 9	August 23, 2023	The Theater at Madison Square Garden	New York City, New York, U.S.
54	PFL 8	August 18, 2023	The Theater at Madison Square Garden	New York City, New York, U.S.
53	PFL 7	August 4, 2023	Boeing Center at Tech Port	San Antonio, Texas, U.S.
52	PFL Europe 2	July 8, 2023	Verti Music Hall	Berlin, Germany
51	PFL 6	June 23, 2023	Overtime Elite Arena	Atlanta, Georgia, U.S.
50	PFL 5	June 16, 2023	Overtime Elite Arena	Atlanta, Georgia, U.S.
49	PFL 4	June 8, 2023	Overtime Elite Arena	Atlanta, Georgia, U.S.
48	PFL 3	April 14, 2023	The Theater at Virgin Hotels	Las Vegas, Nevada, U.S.
47	PFL 2	April 7, 2023	The Theater at Virgin Hotels	Las Vegas, Nevada, U.S.
46	PFL 1	April 1, 2023	The Theater at Virgin Hotels	Las Vegas, Nevada, U.S.
45	PFL Europe 1	March 25, 2023	Vertu Motors Arena	Newcastle, England, U.K.
44	PFL 10	November 25, 2022	Hulu Theater	New York City, New York, U.S.
43	PFL 9	August 20, 2022	Copper Box Arena	London, England, U.K.
42	PFL 8	August 13, 2022	Cardiff Motorpoint Arena	Cardiff, Wales, U.K.
41	PFL 7	August 5, 2022	Hulu Theater	New York City, New York, U.S.
40	PFL 6	July 1, 2022	Overtime Elite Arena	Atlanta, Georgia, U.S.
39	PFL 5	June 24, 2022	Overtime Elite Arena	Atlanta, Georgia, U.S.
38	PFL 4	June 17, 2022	Overtime Elite Arena	Atlanta, Georgia, U.S.
37	PFL 3	May 6, 2022	Esports Stadium Arlington	Arlington, Texas, U.S.
36	PFL 2	April 28, 2022	Esports Stadium Arlington	Arlington, Texas, U.S.
35	PFL 1	April 20, 2022	Esports Stadium Arlington	Arlington, Texas, U.S.
34	PFL 10	October 27, 2021	Seminole Hard Rock Hotel & Casino Hollywood	Hollywood, Florida, U.S.
33	PFL 9	August 27, 2021	Seminole Hard Rock Hotel & Casino Hollywood	Hollywood, Florida, U.S.
32	PFL 8	August 19, 2021	Seminole Hard Rock Hotel & Casino Hollywood	Hollywood, Florida, U.S.
31	PFL 7	August 13, 2021	Seminole Hard Rock Hotel & Casino Hollywood	Hollywood, Florida, U.S.
30	PFL 6	June 25, 2021	Ocean Casino Resort	Atlantic City, New Jersey, U.S.
29	PFL 5	June 17, 2021	Ocean Casino Resort	Atlantic City, New Jersey, U.S.
28	PFL 4	June 10, 2021	Ocean Casino Resort	Atlantic City, New Jersey, U.S.
27	PFL 3	May 6, 2021	Ocean Casino Resort	Atlantic City, New Jersey, U.S.
26	PFL 2	April 29, 2021	Ocean Casino Resort	Atlantic City, New Jersey, U.S.
25	PFL 1	April 23, 2021	Ocean Casino Resort	Atlantic City, New Jersey, U.S.
24	PFL 10	December 31, 2019	Hulu Theater at Madison Square Garden	New York City, New York, U.S.
23	PFL 9	October 31, 2019	Mandalay Bay Events Center	Las Vegas, Nevada, U.S.
22	PFL 8	October 17, 2019	Mandalay Bay Events Center	Las Vegas, Nevada, U.S.
21	PFL 7	October 11, 2019	Mandalay Bay Events Center	Las Vegas, Nevada, U.S.
20	PFL 6	August 8, 2019	Ocean Resort Casino	Atlantic City, New Jersey, U.S.
19	PFL 5	July 25, 2019	Ocean Resort Casino	Atlantic City, New Jersey, U.S.
18	PFL 4	July 11, 2019	Ocean Resort Casino	Atlantic City, New Jersey, U.S.
17	PFL 3	June 6, 2019	Nassau Coliseum	Uniondale, New York, U.S.
16	PFL 2	May 23, 2019	Nassau Coliseum	Uniondale, New York, U.S.
15	PFL 1	May 9, 2019	Nassau Coliseum	Uniondale, New York, U.S.
14	PFL 11	December 31, 2018	Hulu Theater at Madison Square Garden	New York City, New York, U.S.
13	PFL 10	October 20, 2018	Entertainment and Sports Arena	Washington, D.C., U.S.
12	PFL 9	October 13, 2018	Long Beach Arena	Long Beach, California, U.S.
11	PFL 8	October 5, 2018	Ernest N. Morial Convention Center	New Orleans, Louisiana, U.S.
10	PFL 7	August 30, 2018	Ocean Resort Casino	Atlantic City, New Jersey, U.S.
9	PFL 6	August 16, 2018	Ocean Resort Casino	Atlantic City, New Jersey, U.S.
8	PFL 5	August 2, 2018	Nassau Coliseum	Uniondale, New York, U.S.
7	PFL 4	July 19, 2018	Nassau Coliseum	Uniondale, New York, U.S.
6	PFL 3	July 5, 2018	Charles E. Smith Center	Washington, D.C., U.S.
5	PFL 2	June 21, 2018	Chicago Theater	Chicago, Illinois, U.S.
4	PFL 1	June 7, 2018	Hulu Theater at Madison Square Garden	New York City, New York, U.S.
3	PFL Fight Night	November 2, 2017	Washington Hilton	Washington, D.C., U.S.
2	PFL Everett	July 29, 2017	Xfinity Arena	Everett, Washington, U.S.
1	PFL Daytona	June 30, 2017	Daytona International Speedway	Daytona Beach, Florida, U.S.

=== WSOF events ===
#	Event	Date	Venue	Location
42	WSOF35: Ivanov vs. Jordan	March 18, 2017	Turning Stone Casino	Verona, New York, U.S.
41	WSOF34: Gaethje vs. Firmino	December 31, 2016	The Theater at Madison Square Garden	New York City, New York, U.S.
40	WSOF33: Branch vs. Magalhães	October 7, 2016	Municipal Auditorium	Kansas City, Missouri, U.S.
39	WSOF32: Moraes vs. Hill 2	July 30, 2016	Xfinity Arena	Everett, Washington, U.S.
38	WSOF Global Championship 3: Philippines	July 30, 2016	Smart Araneta Coliseum	Quezon City, Philippines
37	WSOF31: Ivanov vs. Copeland	June 17, 2016	Foxwoods Resort Casino	Mashantucket, Connecticut, U.S.
36	WSOF30: Branch vs. Starks	April 2, 2016	Hard Rock Hotel and Casino	Las Vegas, Nevada, U.S.
35	WSOF29: Gaethje vs. Foster	March 12, 2016	Bank of Colorado Arena	Greeley, Colorado, U.S.
34	WSOF28: Moraes vs. Barajas	February 20, 2016	Next Level Sports Complex	Garden Grove, California, U.S.
33	WSOF Global Championship 2: Japan	February 7, 2016	Tokyo Dome City Hall	Tokyo, Japan
32	WSOF27: Firmino vs. Fodor	January 23, 2016	FedExForum	Memphis, Tennessee, U.S.
31	WSOF26: Palmer vs. Almeida	December 18, 2015	The Chelsea at The Cosmopolitan	Las Vegas, Nevada, U.S.
30	WSOF Global Championship 1: China	November 21, 2015	Haikou Arena	Haikou, China
29	WSOF25: Lightweight Tournament	November 20, 2015	Comerica Theatre	Phoenix, Arizona, U.S.
28	WSOF24: Fitch vs. Okami	October 17, 2015	Foxwoods Resort Casino	Mashantucket, Connecticut, U.S.
27	WSOF23: Gaethje vs. Palomino II	September 18, 2015	Comerica Theatre	Phoenix, Arizona, U.S.
26	WSOF22: Palhares vs. Shields	August 1, 2015	Planet Hollywood Resort & Casino	Las Vegas, Nevada, U.S.
25	WSOF21: Palmer vs. Horodecki	June 5, 2015	Edmonton Expo Centre	Edmonton, Alberta, Canada
24	WSOF20: Branch vs. McElligott	April 10, 2015	Foxwoods Resort Casino	Mashantucket, Connecticut, U.S.
23	WSOF19: Gaethje vs. Palomino	March 28, 2015	Comerica Theatre	Phoenix, Arizona, U.S.
22	WSOF18: Moraes vs. Hill	February 12, 2015	Edmonton Expo Centre	Edmonton, Alberta, Canada
21	WSOF17: Shields vs. Foster	January 17, 2015	Hard Rock Hotel & Casino	Las Vegas, Nevada, U.S.
20	WSOF16: Palhares vs. Fitch	December 13, 2014	McClellan Conference Center	Sacramento, California, U.S.
19	WSOF15: Branch vs. Okami	November 15, 2014	USF Sun Dome	Tampa, Florida, U.S.
18	WSOF14: Ford vs. Shields	October 11, 2014	Edmonton Expo Centre	Edmonton, Alberta, Canada
17	WSOF13: Moraes vs. Bollinger	September 13, 2014	Sands Casino Resort Bethlehem	Bethlehem, Pennsylvania, U.S.
16	WSOF12: Palomino vs. Gonzalez	August 9, 2014	Hard Rock Hotel & Casino	Las Vegas, Nevada, U.S.
15	WSOF11: Gaethje vs. Newell	July 5, 2014	Ocean Center	Daytona Beach, Florida, U.S.
14	WSOF10: Branch vs. Taylor	June 21, 2014	Hard Rock Hotel & Casino	Las Vegas, Nevada, U.S.
13	WSOF Canada 2: Loiseau vs. Lewis	June 7, 2014	Edmonton Expo Centre	Edmonton, Alberta, Canada
12	WSOF9: Carl vs. Palhares	March 29, 2014	Hard Rock Hotel & Casino	Paradise, Nevada, U.S.
11	WSOF Canada 1: Ford vs. Powell	February 21, 2014	Edmonton Expo Centre	Edmonton, Alberta, Canada
10	WSOF8: Gaethje vs. Patishnock	January 18, 2014	Seminole Hard Rock Hotel & Casino	Hollywood, Florida, U.S.
9	WSOF 2: Central America	December 14, 2013	Pharaoh's Casino	Managua, Nicaragua
8	WSOF7: Karakhanyan vs. Palmer	December 7, 2013	PNE Agrodome	Vancouver, British Columbia, Canada
7	WSOF6: Burkman vs. Carl	October 26, 2013	BankUnited Center	Coral Gables, Florida, U.S.
6	WSOF5: Arlovski vs. Kyle	September 14, 2013	Revel Atlantic City	Atlantic City, New Jersey, U.S.
5	WSOF4: Spong vs. DeAnda	August 10, 2013	Citizens Business Bank Arena	Ontario, California, U.S.
4	WSOF1: Central America	July 27, 2013	Nicaragua National Football Stadium	Managua, Nicaragua
3	WSOF3: Fitch vs. Burkman 2	June 14, 2013	Hard Rock Hotel and Casino	Paradise, Nevada, U.S.
2	WSOF2: Arlovski vs. Johnson	March 23, 2013	Revel Atlantic City	Atlantic City, New Jersey, U.S.
1	WSOF1: Arlovski vs. Cole	November 3, 2012	Planet Hollywood Resort and Casino	Paradise, Nevada, U.S.

== Number of events by year ==
=== WSOF ===
- 2012 – 1
- 2013 – 8
- 2014 – 11
- 2015 – 11
- 2016 – 10
- 2017 – 4

=== PFL ===
- 2018 – 11
- 2019 – 10
- 2021 – 10
- 2022 – 10
- 2023 – 14
- 2024 – 19
- 2025 – 24
- 2026 – 21

== Event locations ==
The following locations have hosted a combined 164 WSOF and PFL events as of 2026.

United States (111)

Location	Visits
Las Vegas, Nevada	16
Atlantic City, New Jersey	14
New York City, New York	8
Hollywood, Florida	7
Washington, D.C.	6
Atlanta, Georgia	6
Chicago, Illinois	5
Uniondale, New York	5
Orlando, Florida	4
Phoenix, Arizona	3
Mashantucket, Connecticut	3
Arlington, Texas	3
Daytona Beach, Florida	2
Tampa, Florida	2
Charlotte, North Carolina	2
Sioux Falls, South Dakota	2
Nashville, Tennessee	2
San Antonio, Texas	2
Everett, Washington	2
Garden Grove, California	1
Long Beach, California	1
Ontario, California	1
Sacramento, California	1
San Diego, California	1
Greeley, Colorado	1
Uncasville, Connecticut	1
Coral Gables, Florida	1
Wichita, Kansas	1
New Orleans, Louisiana	1
Kansas City, Missouri	1
Elmont, New York	1
Verona, New York	1
Bethlehem, Pennsylvania	1
Pittsburgh, Pennsylvania	1
Memphis, Tennessee	1
Austin, Texas	1
Salt Lake City, Utah	1

Saudi Arabia (12)

Location	Visits
Riyadh	10
Jeddah	1
Khobar	1

Canada (6)

Location	Visits
Edmonton, Alberta	5
Vancouver, British Columbia	1

United Kingdom (6)

Location	Visits
Belfast	2
Newcastle upon Tyne	2
London	1
Cardiff	1
Glasgow	1

France (5)

Location	Visits
Lyon	2
Paris	2
Nantes	1

United Arab Emirates (5)

Location	Visits
Dubai	5

South Africa (3)

Location	Visits
Cape Town	1
Johannesburg	1
Pretoria	4

Belgium (2)

Location	Visits
Brussels	2

Nicaragua (2)

Location	Visits
Managua	2

Benin (1)

Location	Visits
Cotonou	1

China (1)

Location	Visits
Haikou	1

Germany (1)

Location	Visits
Berlin	1

(Republic of Ireland) Ireland (1)

Location	Visits
Dublin	1

Japan (1)

Location	Visits
Tokyo	1

Morocco (1)

Location	Visits
Casablanca	1

Nigeria (1)

Location	Visits
Lagos	1

Philippines (1)

Location	Visits
Quezon City	1

Rwanda (1)

Location	Visits
Kigali	1

Spain (1)

Location	Visits
Madrid	1
