= Johnny Case =

American mixed martial artist

- Born: Johnny Case; June 28, 1989 (age 37); Jefferson, Iowa, United States
- Other names: Hollywood
- Height: 5 ft 10 in (1.78 m)
- Weight: 156 lb (71 kg; 11 st 2 lb)
- Division: Lightweight
- Reach: 72 1/2 in (184 cm)
- Style: Boxing
- Fighting out of: Las Vegas, Nevada, United States
- Team: Alliance MMA (2014–2015); Power MMA (2015–2016); The MMA Lab (2016–present); Xtreme Couture Mixed Martial Arts (2018–2021); Bonsai jiu-jitsu (2022–present)
- Rank: Purple belt in Brazilian Jiu-Jitsu under John Crouch
- Years active: 2007–present

Professional boxing record
- Total: 5
- Wins: 5
- By knockout: 4
- Losses: 0

Mixed martial arts record
- Total: 41
- Wins: 29
- By knockout: 21
- By submission: 4
- By decision: 4
- Losses: 10
- By knockout: 4
- By submission: 3
- By decision: 3
- Draws: 1
- No contests: 1

Other information
- Boxing record from BoxRec
- Mixed martial arts record from Sherdog

Johnny Case (born June 28, 1989) is an American mixed martial artist and professional boxer who currently competes in the Lightweight division of RIZIN. A professional since 2007, he formerly competed in the Ultimate Fighting Championship, Professional Fighters League, and RFA.

== Background ==
Case was born and raised in Jefferson, Iowa. He began wrestling in kindergarten and continued through Jefferson-Scranton High School from where he graduated. He had a wrestling scholarship for college but opted to turn it down in pursuit of mixed martial arts career.

== Mixed martial arts career ==
Case began competing professionally almost immediately, losing in the first round in his first two fights after just one amateur fight, a first-round win. He competed for various regional promotions across the Midwest for several years, compiling a record of 18–4 along the way, before signing with the UFC on the heels of an eight fight win streak in the spring of 2014.

=== Ultimate Fighting Championship ===
Case was initially slated to make his UFC debut as a short-notice replacement for Francisco Treviño to face Joe Ellenberger on June 28, 2014, at UFC Fight Night 44. However, Case did not pass an eye exam and was replaced by James Moontasri.

Case eventually debuted against Kazuki Tokudome on September 20, 2014, at UFC Fight Night 52. Case won the fight via technical submission in the second round. The finish earned Case a Performance of the Night bonus.

Case was linked to a bout with Paul Felder on January 18, 2015, at UFC Fight Night 59. However, Felder elected to fight as a replacement against Danny Castillo at UFC 182 and was briefly replaced by Francisco Treviño. On December 23, it was announced that Treviño had to pull out of the bout due to an injury and was replaced by newcomer Frankie Perez. Case finished Perez via TKO in the third round.

Case faced Francisco Treviño on June 13, 2015, at UFC 188. He won the fight by unanimous decision.

As the first bout of his new five-fight contract, Case faced Yan Cabral on November 7, 2015, at UFC Fight Night 77. He won the fight by unanimous decision.

Case faced Jake Matthews on March 20, 2016, at UFC Fight Night 85. Case lost the fight via submission in the third round. Both participants were awarded Fight of the Night.

Case was scheduled to face James Vick on February 4, 2017, at UFC Fight Night 104. However, on January 19, Case pulled out of the fight with an injury and was replaced by Abel Trujillo.

Case faced Anthony Rocco Martin on June 25, 2017, at UFC Fight Night 112. He lost the fight via unanimous decision. It was later announced that Case was released from the UFC.

=== Professional Fighters League ===
Racking two victories in the regional circuit, Case signed with the Professional Fighters League to participate as an alternate on short notice against Jason High at PFL 7 on August 30, 2018. However, High was not unable to make weight and Case was awarded a walkover victory with which he advanced to the playoffs.

In the playoffs Case was pitted against Natan Schulte at PFL 9 on October 13, 2018. The bout ended in a majority draw, but Schulte advanced to the semi-finals and Case was eliminated from the tournament.

=== Rizin FF ===
As the first bout of his four-fight contract, Case faced Yusuke Yachi at Rizin 14 on December 31, 2018. He won the fight via TKO due to a cut in the second round.

Case then faced Satoru Kitaoka at Rizin 17 on July 28, 2019. He won the bout via technical knockout after the initial round.

==== Rizin Lightweight Grand Prix ====
After the Kitaoka bout it was announced that Case would be participating the Rizin Lightweight Grand Prix. In the quarterfinals at Rizin 19 on October 12, 2019, Case faced Roberto de Souza. Case won the fight via first round knockout, advancing to the semifinals.

In the semifinals which were at Rizin 20 on December 31, 2019, Case faced Tofiq Musayev. After the back-and-forth fight, Case lost the fight via knockout in the first round.

=== Return to PFL ===
In January 2020 it was announced that Case will be returning to the PFL and participating the third season's lightweight division tournament.

Case was expected to face Loik Radzhabov on April 23, 2021, at PFL 1. However, due to an arrest, Case had to pull out and was replaced by Alexander Martinez.

=== Return to Rizin FF ===
Case challenged for the Rizin Lightweight Championship against reigning champion Roberto de Souza at Rizin 35 on April 16, 2022. He lost the bout in the first round via reverse triangle armbar.

Case then faced Koji Taked at Rizin 37 on July 31, 2022. He lost the bout via unanimous decision.

Case was then scheduled to face Luiz Gustavo at Rizin 40 on December 31, 2022. However, Gustavo was removed from the bout due to an injury and was replaced by Nobumitsu Osawa. Case won the fight by first-round knockout 36 seconds into the bout.

Case was scheduled to face Ali Abdulkhalikov at Rizin Landmark 5 on April 29, 2023. However, due to undisclosed reasons, Case was removed from the bout and was replaced by Tatsyua Saika.

Case next fought Japanese Kickboxer Noah Bey at Rizin 47 on June 9, 2024. Case missed weight coming at 158.7 pounds for this Lightweight bout and received a point deduction should this fight go to the distance. Case would go on to lose the bout via unanimous decision in a fight he would've won without the point deduction.

== Personal life ==
Case has two sons – Kruz and Kuper – from a previous relationship.

On April 1, 2021, Case was arrested for domestic battery charges in Las Vegas, Nevada. Case claimed self-defense in throwing the victim to the ground to stop her from striking him. Due to Case corroborating the victim’s report that he threw her to the ground – along with his history as a professional fighter – police deemed him as the primary aggressor. The case was later dropped.

== Championships and accomplishments ==
- Ultimate Fighting Championship
  - Performance of the Night (One time) vs. Kazuki Tokudome
  - Fight of the Night (One time) vs. Jake Matthews
- Midwest Cage Championship
  - MCC Lightweight Championship (one time; former)
    - Three successful title defenses

== Mixed martial arts record ==
Professional record breakdown
40 matches	29 wins	10 losses
By knockout	21	4
By submission	4	3
By decision	4	3
No contests	1	

Res.	Record	Opponent	Method	Event	Date	Round	Time	Location	Notes
Win	29–10–1 (1)	Tenya Yoshimura	TKO (punches)	Rizin Landmark 15	July 18, 2026	1	3:14	Hiroshima, Japan	
NC	28–10–1 (1)	Juri Ohara	NC (missed weight)	Rizin World Series in Korea	May 31, 2025	1	2:20	Incheon, South Korea	Catchweight (157.2 lb) bout; Case missed weight. Originally ruled a KO (punch) win for Case; overturned by promoter due to him missing weight.
Loss	28–10–1	BeyNoah	Decision (unanimous)	Rizin 47	June 9, 2024	3	5:00	Tokyo, Japan	Catchweight (158.7 lb) bout; Case missed weight.
Win	28–9–1	Nobumitsu Osawa	TKO (punches)	Rizin 40	December 31, 2022	1	0:36	Saitama, Japan	
Loss	27–9–1	Koji Takeda	Decision (unanimous)	Rizin 37	July 31, 2022	3	5:00	Saitama, Japan	Catchweight (159 lb) bout.
Loss	27–8–1	Roberto de Souza	Submission (reverse triangle armbar)	Rizin 35	April 17, 2022	1	3:32	Chōfu, Japan	For the Rizin Lightweight Championship.
Loss	27–7–1	Tofiq Musayev	TKO (punches)	Rizin 20	December 31, 2019	1	2:46	Saitama, Japan	2019 Rizin Lightweight Grand Prix Semifinal.
Win	27–6–1	Roberto de Souza	TKO (submission to punch)	Rizin 19	October 12, 2019	1	1:15	Osaka, Japan	2019 Rizin Lightweight Grand Prix Quarterfinal.
Win	26–6–1	Satoru Kitaoka	TKO (corner stoppage)	Rizin 17	July 28, 2019	1	5:00	Saitama, Japan	
Win	25–6–1	Yusuke Yachi	TKO (doctor stoppage)	Rizin 14	December 31, 2018	2	4:47	Saitama, Japan	
Draw	24–6–1	Natan Schulte	Draw (majority)	PFL 9 (2018)	October 13, 2018	2	5:00	Long Beach, California, United States	2018 PFL Lightweight Tournament Quarterfinal.
Win	24–6	Jose Luis Verdugo	TKO (punches)	Iron Boy MMA 12	July 28, 2018	1	0:36	Phoenix, Arizona, United States	
Win	23–6	Brandon Longano	TKO (punches)	Extreme Beatdown 21	March 10, 2018	2	3:25	New Town, North Dakota, United States	
Loss	22–6	Anthony Rocco Martin	Decision (unanimous)	UFC Fight Night: Chiesa vs. Lee	June 25, 2017	3	5:00	Oklahoma City, Oklahoma, United States	
Loss	22–5	Jake Matthews	Submission (rear-naked choke)	UFC Fight Night: Hunt vs. Mir	March 20, 2016	3	4:45	Brisbane, Australia	Fight of the Night.
Win	22–4	Yan Cabral	Decision (unanimous)	UFC Fight Night: Belfort vs. Henderson 3	November 7, 2015	3	5:00	São Paulo, Brazil	
Win	21–4	Francisco Treviño	Decision (unanimous)	UFC 188	June 13, 2015	3	5:00	Mexico City, Mexico	
Win	20–4	Frankie Perez	TKO (elbows and punches)	UFC Fight Night: McGregor vs. Siver	January 18, 2015	3	1:54	Boston, Massachusetts, United States	
Win	19–4	Kazuki Tokudome	Technical Submission (guillotine choke)	UFC Fight Night: Hunt vs. Nelson	September 20, 2014	2	2:34	Saitama, Japan	Performance of the Night.
Win	18–4	E.J. Brooks	Decision (split)	RFA 10	October 25, 2013	3	5:00	Des Moines, Iowa, United States	
Win	17–4	Ted Worthington	TKO (submission to punches)	MCC 49	August 2, 2013	2	2:47	Des Moines, Iowa, United States	Defended the MCC Lightweight Championship.
Win	16–4	Demi Deeds	TKO (punches)	MCC 46	February 22, 2013	2	4:12	Des Moines, Iowa, United States	Defended the MCC Lightweight Championship.
Win	15–4	Sean Wilson	TKO (submission to punches)	MCC 44	November 21, 2012	1	4:07	Des Moines, Iowa, United States	Defended the MCC Lightweight Championship.
Win	14–4	Jay Ellis	KO (punch)	Brutaal: Fight Night	February 18, 2012	1	2:30	Red Wing, Minnesota, United States	
Win	13–4	Derek Getzel	Decision (unanimous)	Brutaal: Fight Night	July 30, 2011	3	5:00	Red Wing, Minnesota, United States	
Win	12–4	Lonnie Scriven	KO (punch)	MCC 33	April 9, 2011	1	0:18	Des Moines, Iowa, United States	Won the MCC Lightweight Championship.
Win	11–4	Jeremy Castro	TKO (punches)	MCC 31	January 15, 2011	2	0:29	Des Moines, Iowa, United States	
Loss	10–4	Rick Glenn	TKO (submission to punches)	MCC 29	October 22, 2010	1	4:07	Des Moines, Iowa, United States	
Win	10–3	Tyler Mills	KO (punches)	Brutaal: Fight Night	August 27, 2010	1	0:31	Jefferson, Iowa, United States	
Win	9–3	Mike Miller	Submission (rear-naked choke)	MCC 26	April 16, 2010	1	1:02	Des Moines, Iowa, United States	
Loss	8–3	Derek Getzel	TKO (punches)	Brutaal: Strikeforce Final	February 26, 2010	1	2:05	Minneapolis, Minnesota, United States	
Win	8–2	James Winters	KO (punches)	Iowa Insanity 1	December 20, 2009	1	0:52	Boone, Iowa, United States	
Win	7–2	Brandon Bergeron	TKO (punches)	Brutaal Fight Night: It's War	November 25, 2009	1	1:18	St. Paul, Minnesota, United States	
Win	6–2	Gabe Walbridge	Submission (guillotine choke)	Ambition Promotions: The Crucible	September 12, 2009	2	0:29	St. Paul, Minnesota, United States	
Win	5–2	Roland Larson	KO (punch)	Brutaal Fight Night: David and Goliath	April 11, 2009	1	0:59	Ames, Iowa, United States	
Win	4–2	Nate Boebel	KO (punches)	Brutaal Fight Night 26	February 21, 2009	1	0:51	LaCrosse, Wisconsin, United States	
Win	3–2	Travis Nath	Submission (choke)	Brutaal Fight Night 24	December 13, 2008	1	1:03	Maplewood, Minnesota, United States	
Win	2–2	Tim Morris	TKO (punches)	Brutaal Fight Night 16	July 12, 2008	1	2:50	Jefferson, Iowa, United States	
Win	1–2	Jerald Steer	KO (punch)	Brutaal Fight Night 14	June 13, 2008	1	0:48	Elko, Minnesota, United States	
Loss	0–2	Marcus LeVesseur	KO (punch)	Seconds Out/Vivid MMA	May 17, 2008	1	0:23	St. Paul, Minnesota, United States	
Loss	0–1	Chad Murphy	Submission (armbar)	Brutaal Fight Night 3	December 5, 2007	1	N/A	Maplewood, Minnesota, United States	Lightweight debut.

== Professional boxing record ==
4 fights	4 wins	0 losses
By knockout	4	0

No.	Result	Record	Opponent	Type	Round, time	Date	Location	Notes
4	Win	4–0	(United States) Antwaun Darnell Gross	KO	1 (4), 0:32	12 November 2022	(United States) Wild rose Casino, Jefferson, Iowa, US	
3	Win	3–0	(United States) Thomas Allen	KO	2 (4), 0:50	19 February 2022	(United States) Horizon Events Center, Clive, Iowa, US	
2	Win	2–0	(United States) Joseph Borys	KO	1 (4), 2:58	30 October 2021	(United States) Wild Rose Casino, Jefferson, Iowa, US	
1	Win	1–0	(United States) Jamarius Brown	KO	2 (4), 1:10	17 July 2021	(United States) Wild Rose Casino, Jefferson, Iowa, US	

== Entrepreneur career ==
Case made it public in 2016 that he was making his first investment, by purchasing Midwest Cage Championship from MCC founder, Ryan Hass. Based out of Des Moines, Iowa, Johnny Hollywood got his start in MMA by fighting for MCC and would eventually become the MCC Lightweight Champion.

Case has stated that he is actively pursuing his life outside of his MMA career, as an entrepreneur and investor, with his Venture Capital firm. Hollywood established his firm in 2015 and started to pick up steam in 2016.

== See also ==
- List of male mixed martial artists
