= UFC 214 =

UFC mixed martial arts event in 2017

UFC 214: Cormier vs. Jones 2
- The poster for UFC 214: Cormier vs. Jones 2
- Promotion: Ultimate Fighting Championship
- Date: July 29, 2017
- Venue: Honda Center
- City: Anaheim, California
- Attendance: 16,610
- Total gate: $2,448,870

Event chronology
UFC on Fox: Weidman vs. Gastelum	UFC 214: Cormier vs. Jones 2	UFC Fight Night: Pettis vs. Moreno

UFC 214: Cormier vs. Jones 2 was a mixed martial arts event produced by the Ultimate Fighting Championship and held on July 29, 2017, at the Honda Center in Anaheim, California.

== Background ==
A PPV event was initially planned for Anaheim on January 21, 2017, but was rescheduled for this date after a lack of suitable headlining fights could be arranged for the initial date in January.

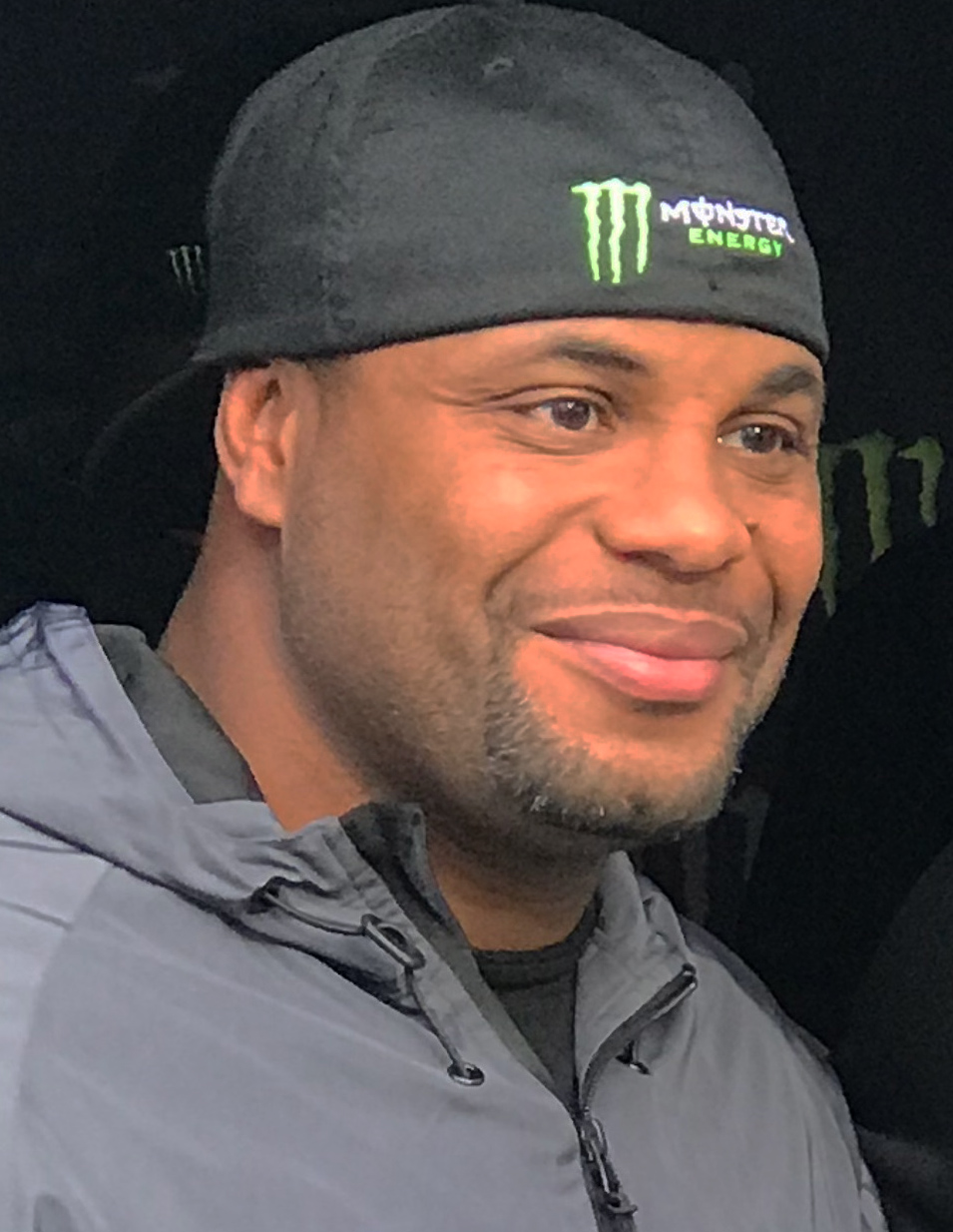
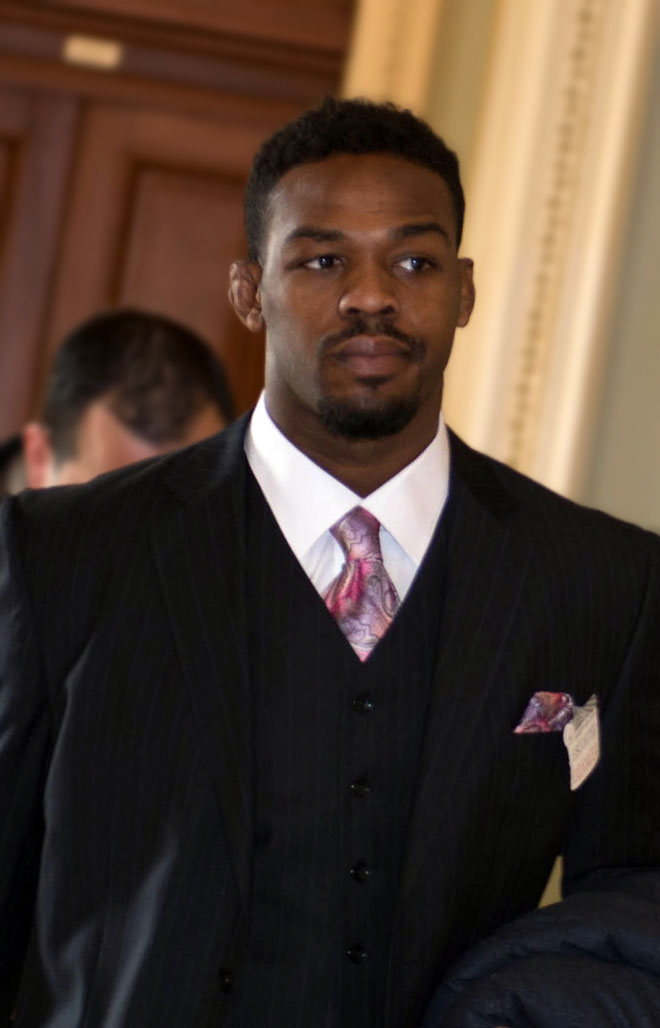
This was the third time that the UFC booked a rematch between Cormier (left) and Jones (right), after previous attempts (UFC 197 and UFC 200) were scrapped.

A UFC Light Heavyweight Championship bout between current champion Daniel Cormier and former champion Jon Jones had been targeted for this event. The pairing met previously at UFC 182 in January 2015 with Jones defending his title via unanimous decision. Subsequent to that victory, Jones was stripped of the title and suspended indefinitely from the UFC in connection with a hit-and-run incident in which he was involved. Cormier replaced him and went on to defeat Anthony Johnson at UFC 187 to win the vacant title. Their rematch was originally expected to take place at UFC 197, but Cormier pulled out three weeks before the event due to injury and was replaced by Ovince Saint Preux, in what became an interim title bout. Jones went on to defeat Saint Preux by unanimous decision and won the interim title. The fight was scheduled again and was expected to headline UFC 200 in July 2016. However, Jones was pulled out of the fight by USADA due to a potential Anti-Doping Policy violation stemming from an out-of-competition sample collection on June 16. Jones' "B" sample also came positive for the same substances and Jones was suspended for one year, retroactively to July 6, 2016. The Cormier-Jones rematch was officially announced on May 12, though its status as main event or co-headliner was not initially confirmed. UFC president Dana White confirmed that the bout would headline this event, despite previous issues regarding Jones. He also announced that Jimi Manuwa would participate on this card and should anything happen to the main event, Manuwa would be the replacement. On May 31, Volkan Oezdemir was announced as his opponent.

Former Strikeforce Women's Featherweight Champion and Invicta FC Featherweight Champion Cristiane Justino (commonly referred to as Cris Cyborg) expressed her desire to face the inaugural UFC Women's Featherweight Champion Germaine de Randamie at this event. However, de Randamie indicated that she would not face Cyborg due to her repeated transgressions with PEDs (despite Cyborg only failing a test in 2011). The UFC decided to strip her of the title on June 19 due to her refusal to defend it and then booked Cyborg against promotional newcomer and current Invicta FC Featherweight Champion Megan Anderson for the vacant title. In turn, Anderson pulled out on June 27 for personal reasons and was replaced by current Invicta FC Bantamweight Champion Tonya Evinger.

On June 28, a UFC Welterweight Championship bout between current champion Tyron Woodley and former UFC Middleweight Championship challenger and multiple-time jiu-jitsu world champion Demian Maia was announced as the third title fight of this event.

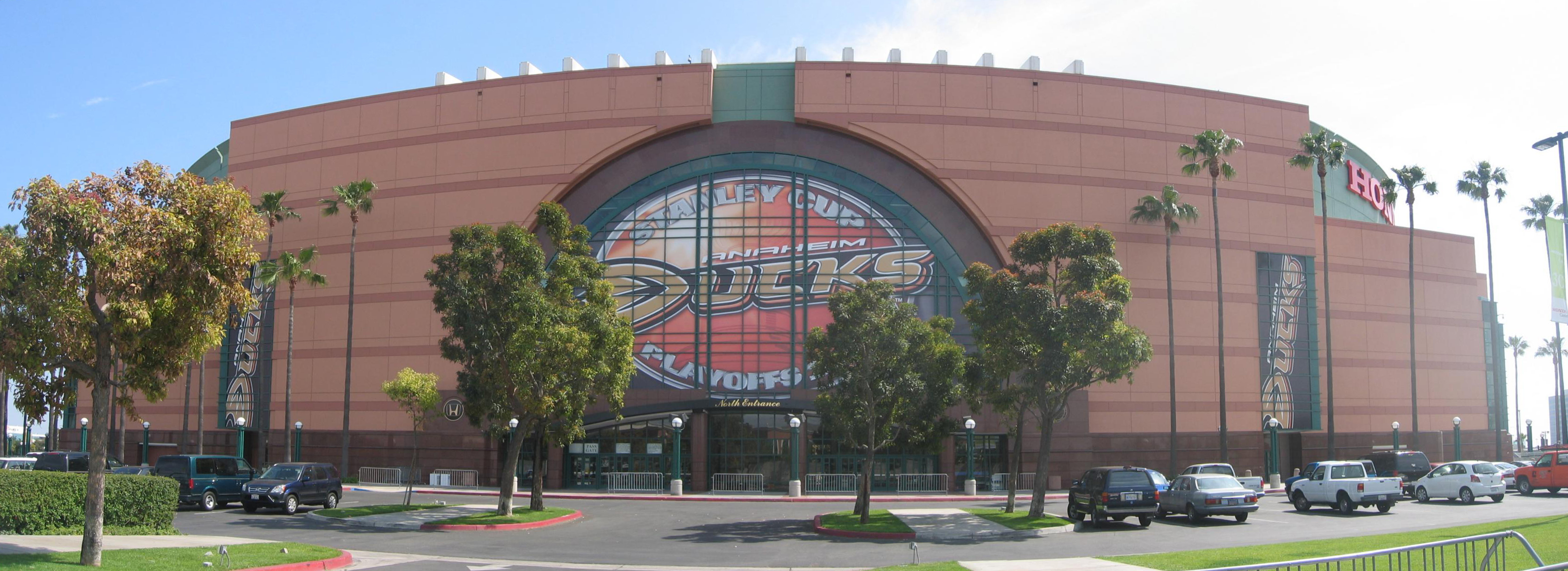
Home of the Anaheim Ducks, the Honda Center hosted its seventh UFC event.

A featherweight bout between former UFC Featherweight Championship challengers Ricardo Lamas and Chan Sung Jung was originally in the works for UFC on Fox: Weidman vs. Gastelum. However, on May 12, the bout was confirmed for this event. The pairing was originally slated to take place in July 2013 at UFC 162, but Jung was pulled from the bout in favor of a title fight against then-champion José Aldo at UFC 163. Subsequently, Jung pulled out of the fight in early June due to a severe knee injury. He was replaced by Jason Knight.

Doo Ho Choi was expected to face Andre Fili at the event, but pulled out on June 14 due to injury. On July 15, promotional newcomer Calvin Kattar was announced as his replacement.

Claudio Puelles was expected to face Sage Northcutt, but pulled out on June 19 due to a knee injury. He was replaced by John Makdessi. In turn, the fight was canceled on July 14 due to both fighters being injured.

A welterweight bout between former UFC Welterweight Champion Robbie Lawler and former UFC Lightweight Championship challenger Donald Cerrone was originally booked for UFC 205. However, Lawler pulled out to take a little more time after recovering from his previous fight at UFC 201. The fight was then rescheduled to take place on July 8, 2017, at UFC 213. Reports began to circulate on June 28 that Cerrone had sustained a minor injury and that the pairing would be left intact, but shifted to this event. UFC President Dana White confirmed later that Cerrone in fact had a staph infection and a pulled groin, and while the plan was to keep the bout, it wouldn't happen at this event. In the end, the bout was confirmed on July 2 for this event.

On June 28, the California State Athletic Commission (CSAC) denied former UFC Bantamweight Champion Renan Barão a bout at that weight class against Aljamain Sterling, due to his previous weight issues at UFC 177, in Sacramento, California. The bout still happened, but at a catchweight of 140 pounds. CSAC Executive Director Andy Foster said that if Barão makes weight with no issues, the CSAC will revisit the possibility of allowing him at 135 lb in the future.

Sara McMann and Ketlen Vieira were expected to face each other at the event, but on July 7 it was announced that the bout was moved to UFC 215 in September.

A heavyweight fight between Dmitrii Smolyakov and promotional newcomer Adam Wieczorek was scheduled for the preliminary portion of the event. However, the bout was removed from the card for undisclosed reasons on July 17 and is expected to be rescheduled for a future event in October.

== Results ==
Main Card
Weight class				Method	Round	Time	Notes
Light Heavyweight	Daniel Cormier (c)	vs.	Jon Jones	NC (overturned)	3	3:01	(Note: For the UFC Light Heavyweight Championship. Originally a KO (head kick and punches) win for Jones, overturned after he tested positive for turinabol.)
Welterweight	Tyron Woodley (c)	def.	Demian Maia	Decision (unanimous) (50–45, 49–46, 49–46)	5	5:00	(Note: For the UFC Welterweight Championship.)
Women's Featherweight	Cris Cyborg	def.	Tonya Evinger	TKO (knees)	3	1:56	(Note: For the vacant UFC Women's Featherweight Championship.)
Welterweight	Robbie Lawler	def.	Donald Cerrone	Decision (unanimous) (29–28, 29–28, 29–28)	3	5:00
Light Heavyweight	Volkan Oezdemir	def.	Jimi Manuwa	KO (punches)	1	0:42
Preliminary Card (FXX)
Featherweight	Ricardo Lamas	def.	Jason Knight	TKO (punches)	1	4:34
Catchweight (140 lb)	Aljamain Sterling	def.	Renan Barão	Decision (unanimous) (29–28, 29–27, 30–26)	3	5:00
Featherweight	Brian Ortega	def.	Renato Moicano	Submission (guillotine choke)	3	2:59
Featherweight	Calvin Kattar	def.	Andre Fili	Decision (unanimous) (30–27, 30–27, 30–27)	3	5:00
Preliminary Card (UFC Fight Pass)
Women's Strawweight	Aleksandra Albu	def.	Kailin Curran	Decision (unanimous) (29–28, 29–28, 29–28)	3	5:00
Flyweight	Jarred Brooks	def.	Eric Shelton	Decision (split) (29–28, 28–29, 29–28)	3	5:00
Lightweight	Drew Dober	def.	Josh Burkman	KO (punch)	1	3:04

== Bonus awards ==
The following fighters were awarded $50,000 bonuses:

- Fight of the Night: Brian Ortega vs. Renato Moicano
- Performance of the Night: Jon Jones and Volkan Oezdemir

== Reported payout ==
The following is the reported payout to the fighters as reported to the California State Athletic Commission. It does not include sponsor money and also does not include the UFC's traditional "fight night" bonuses. The total disclosed payout for the event was $3,636,000.

- Jon Jones: $500,000 (no win bonus) vs. Daniel Cormier: $1,000,000
- Tyron Woodley: $500,000 (no win bonus) def. Demian Maia: $110,000
- Cristiane Justino: $200,000 (no win bonus) def. Tonya Evinger: $100,000
- Robbie Lawler: $300,000 (includes $100,000 win bonus) def. Donald Cerrone: $155,000
- Volkan Oezdemir: $110,000 (includes $30,000 win bonus) def. Jimi Manuwa: $120,000
- Ricardo Lamas: $106,000 (includes $53,000 win bonus) def. Jason Knight: $31,000
- Aljamain Sterling: $66,000 (includes $33,000 win bonus) def. Renan Barão: $53,000
- Brian Ortega: $52,000 (includes $26,000 win bonus) def. Renato Moicano: $23,000
- Calvin Kattar: $24,000 (includes $12,000 win bonus) def. Andre Fili: $24,000
- Alexandra Albu: $20,000 (includes $10,000 win bonus) def. Kailin Curran: $10,000
- Jarred Brooks: $24,000 (includes $12,000 win bonus) def. Eric Shelton: $10,000
- Drew Dober: $44,000 (includes $22,000 win bonus) def. Josh Burkman: $54,000

== Aftermath ==
On August 22, it was announced that Jones was flagged for a potential doping violation by USADA stemming from his urine test sample collected after fight weigh-ins on July 28. He tested positive for Turinabol, an anabolic steroid. Jones was placed on a provisional suspension as a result of the positive drug test pending the full adjudication process. The "B" sample from his pre-fight drug test later confirmed the presence of a banned substance, as announced on September 12. According to the California State Athletic Commission (CSAC), Jones passed multiple out-of-competition tests leading up to the event, as well as a blood test on July 29. That blood test does not significantly aid Jones' case, however, as blood tests do not test for Turinabol. On the following day, the CSAC officially changed the result to a no contest.

On September 13, the UFC announced that Jones was stripped of the title and Cormier was being reinstated as champion. On February 28, 2018, the CSAC revoked Jones' fight license and fined him a total of $205,000, including 40% of his disclosed salary. He can re-apply for a license after his case with USADA is concluded.

On September 20, USADA announced that Jones received a 15-month suspension, after an evidentiary hearing with an independent arbitrator on September 15. The independent arbitrator, well-known anti-doping investigator Richard McLaren, found Jones had "some degree of fault" for the steroid metabolite that showed up in his system, but "the violation was not intended nor could it have enhanced" his performance. The suspension is retroactive to the date his positive sample was collected, making him eligible on October 28.

== See also ==
- List of UFC events
- 2017 in UFC
