= UFC Fight Night: McGregor vs. Siver =

UFC mixed martial arts event in 2015

UFC Fight Night: McGregor vs Siver
- The poster for UFC Fight Night: McGregor vs Siver
- Promotion: Ultimate Fighting Championship
- Date: January 18, 2015
- Venue: TD Garden
- City: Boston, Massachusetts
- Attendance: 13,828
- Total gate: $1,340,000

Event chronology
UFC 182: Jones vs. Cormier	UFC Fight Night: McGregor vs Siver	UFC on Fox: Gustafsson vs. Johnson

UFC Fight Night: McGregor vs. Siver (also known as UFC Fight Night 59) was a mixed martial arts event held on January 18, 2015, at the TD Garden in Boston, Massachusetts.

== Background ==
The event was headlined by a featherweight bout between Conor McGregor and Dennis Siver. It was announced that a victory over Siver will ensure McGregor of a shot at the UFC Featherweight Championship in his next fight.

Jorge Masvidal was expected to face Norman Parke at the event. However, in early December, Masvidal pulled out of the bout citing an injury and was replaced by Gleison Tibau.

Paul Felder was expected to face Johnny Case at the event. However, Felder elected to fight as a replacement against Danny Castillo at UFC 182. He was replaced by Francisco Treviño. On December 23, it was announced that Treviño had to pull out of the bout due to an injury and was replaced by promotional newcomer Frankie Perez.

Costas Philippou was expected to face Uriah Hall at the event. However, Philippou was forced out of the bout due to injury. He was replaced by Strikeforce veteran Louis Taylor. On January 11, it was announced that Taylor pulled out of the fight due to a pulled muscle in his back and had his contract terminated as a result. Hall faced promotional newcomer Ron Stallings.

Eddie Alvarez was expected to face former WEC & UFC Lightweight champion Benson Henderson at the co-main event. However, Alvarez was forced out of the bout due to illness. He was replaced by Donald Cerrone, whom Henderson fought twice before (at WEC 43 and WEC 48) and won both fights. One fight was for the WEC Lightweight Championship and the other one was for the interim belt. Cerrone had previously fought just 15 days before this event at UFC 182, winning his fight against Myles Jury.

== Results ==
Main Card (Fox Sports 1)
Weight class				Method	Round	Time	Notes
Featherweight	Conor McGregor	def.	Dennis Siver	TKO (punches)	2	1:54
Lightweight	Donald Cerrone	def.	Benson Henderson	Decision (unanimous) (29–28, 29–28, 29–28)	3	5:00
Middleweight	Uriah Hall	def.	Ron Stallings	TKO (doctor stoppage)	1	3:37
Lightweight	Gleison Tibau	def.	Norman Parke	Decision (split) (29–28, 28–29, 29–28)	3	5:00
Preliminary Card (Fox Sports 1)
Welterweight	Cathal Pendred	def.	Sean Spencer	Decision (unanimous) (29–28, 30–27, 30–27)	3	5:00
Welterweight	Lorenz Larkin	def.	John Howard	TKO (punches)	1	2:17
Lightweight	Chris Wade	def.	Zhang Lipeng	Decision (unanimous) (30–26, 30–26, 30–26)	3	5:00	(Note: Zhang was docked 1 point in the second round for multiple illegal strikes to the groin.)
Flyweight	Paddy Holohan	def.	Shane Howell	Decision (unanimous) (30–27, 30–27, 30–27)	3	5:00
Lightweight	Johnny Case	def.	Frankie Perez	TKO (elbows and punches)	3	1:54
Featherweight	Charles Rosa	def.	Sean Soriano	Submission (D'Arce choke)	3	4:43
Preliminary Card (UFC Fight Pass)
Light Heavyweight	Sean O'Connell	def.	Matt Van Buren	TKO (punches)	3	2:11
Flyweight	Joby Sanchez	def.	Tateki Matsuda	Decision (split) (29–28, 28–29, 30–27)	3	5:00

== Bonus awards ==
The following fighters were awarded $50,000 bonuses:

- Fight of the Night: Sean O'Connell vs. Matt Van Buren
- Performance of the Night: Conor McGregor and Lorenz Larkin

== Reported payout ==
The following is the reported payout to the fighters as reported to the Massachusetts State Athletic Commission. It does not include sponsor money or "locker room" bonuses often given by the UFC and also do not include the UFC's traditional "fight night" bonuses.

- Conor McGregor: $170,000 (includes $85,000 win bonus) def. Dennis Siver: $39,000
- Donald Cerrone: $146,000 (includes $73,000 win bonus) def. Benson Henderson: $48,000
- Uriah Hall: $28,000 (includes $14,000 win bonus) def. Ron Stallings: $10,000
- Gleison Tibau: $90,000 (includes $45,000 win bonus) def. Norman Parke: $20,000
- Cathal Pendred: $16,000 (includes $8,000 win bonus) def. Sean Spencer: $14,000 ^
- Lorenz Larkin: $56,000 (includes $28,000 win bonus) def. John Howard: $21,000
- Chris Wade: $20,000 (includes $10,000 win bonus) def. Zhang Lieping: $15,000
- Patrick Holohan: $20,000 (includes $10,000 win bonus) def. Shane Howell: $8,000
- Johnny Case: $20,000 (includes $10,000 win bonus) def. Frankie Perez: $8,000
- Charles Rosa: $20,000 (includes $10,000 win bonus) def. Sean Soriano: $8,000
- Sean O'Connell: $20,000 (includes $10,000 win bonus) def. Matt Van Buren $8,000
- Joby Sanchez: $16,000 (includes $8,000 win bonus) def. Tateki Matsuda: $8,000

^ Although not reflected in the Massachusetts State Athletic Commission paperwork, both Pendred and Spencer ($14,000) received win bonuses

== See also ==
- List of UFC events
- 2015 in UFC
