= UFC on Fox: Weidman vs. Gastelum =

UFC mixed martial arts event in 2017

- The poster for UFC on Fox: Weidman vs. Gastelum
- Promotion: Ultimate Fighting Championship
- Date: July 22, 2017
- Venue: Nassau Veterans Memorial Coliseum
- City: Uniondale, New York
- Attendance: 11,918
- Total gate: $1,088,332

Event chronology
UFC Fight Night: Nelson vs. Ponzinibbio	UFC on Fox: Weidman vs. Gastelum	UFC 214: Cormier vs Jones 2

UFC on Fox: Weidman vs. Gastelum (also known as UFC on Fox 25) was a mixed martial arts event produced by the Ultimate Fighting Championship held on July 22, 2017, at the Nassau Veterans Memorial Coliseum in Uniondale, New York.

== Background ==
The event was the first that the UFC has hosted on Long Island.

The event was headlined by a middleweight bout between former UFC Middleweight Champion Chris Weidman and The Ultimate Fighter: Team Jones vs. Team Sonnen middleweight winner Kelvin Gastelum.

A featherweight bout between former UFC Featherweight Championship challengers Ricardo Lamas and Chan Sung Jung was originally in the works to headline or co-headline this event. The pairing was originally slated to take place in July 2013 at UFC 162, but Jung was pulled from the bout in favor of a title fight against then champion José Aldo at UFC 163. On May 12, the bout was confirmed for UFC 214.

A light heavyweight bout between Gian Villante and Patrick Cummins was originally booked for UFC Fight Night: Lewis vs. Abdurakhimov in December 2016. However, Cummins pulled out a week before the event due to a staph infection. The fight eventually took place at this event.

A heavyweight bout between Christian Colombo and Damian Grabowski was expected to take place at UFC Fight Night: Gustafsson vs. Teixeira. However, the pairing was scrapped as both fighters sustained injuries in the weeks leading up to the event. The fight was rescheduled to take place at this event. Subsequently, Colombo was removed from the fight on June 22 for undisclosed reasons and was replaced by Chase Sherman.

Alessio Di Chirico was expected to face Rafael Natal, but pulled out in the weeks leading up to the event due to a neck injury and was replaced by promotional newcomer Eryk Anders.

== Results ==
Main Card (Fox)
Weight class				Method	Round	Time	Notes
Middleweight	Chris Weidman	def.	Kelvin Gastelum	Submission (arm-triangle choke)	3	3:45
Featherweight	Darren Elkins	def.	Dennis Bermudez	Decision (split) (29–28, 28–29, 29–28)	3	5:00
Light Heavyweight	Patrick Cummins	def.	Gian Villante	Decision (split) (29–28, 28–29, 29–28)	3	5:00
Bantamweight	Jimmie Rivera	def.	Thomas Almeida	Decision (unanimous) (29–28, 30–26, 30–27)	3	5:00
Preliminary Card (Fox)
Welterweight	Elizeu Zaleski dos Santos	def.	Lyman Good	Decision (split) (30–27, 28–29, 30–27)	3	5:00
Middleweight	Eryk Anders	def.	Rafael Natal	KO (punches)	1	2:54
Welterweight	Alex Oliveira	def.	Ryan LaFlare	KO (punch)	2	1:50
Heavyweight	Chase Sherman	def.	Damian Grabowski	Decision (unanimous) (30–27, 30–26, 30–27)	3	5:00
Preliminary Card (UFC Fight Pass)
Featherweight	Jeremy Kennedy	def.	Kyle Bochniak	Decision (unanimous) (30–27, 30–27, 29–28)	3	5:00
Bantamweight	Marlon Vera	def.	Brian Kelleher	Submission (armbar)	1	2:18
Heavyweight	Júnior Albini	def.	Timothy Johnson	KO (punches)	1	2:51
Featherweight	Shane Burgos	def.	Godofredo Pepey	Decision (unanimous) (30–26, 30–26, 29–28)	3	5:00
Lightweight	Chris Wade	def.	Frankie Perez	Decision (unanimous) (29–28, 29–28, 30–27)	3	5:00

== Bonus awards ==
The following fighters were awarded $50,000 bonuses:

- Fight of the Night: Elizeu Zaleski dos Santos vs. Lyman Good
- Performance of the Night: Alex Oliveira and Júnior Albini

== See also ==
- 2017 in UFC
- List of UFC events
- Mixed martial arts in New York
