= James Vick =

American mixed martial arts fighter

- Born: James William Vick; February 23, 1987 (age 39); Mineral Wells, Texas, U.S.
- Nickname: The Texecutioner
- Height: 6 ft 3 in (1.91 m)
- Weight: 170 lb (77 kg; 12 st)
- Division: super middleweight (boxing); Lightweight / Welterweight (MMA)
- Reach: 76 in (193 cm)
- Stance: Orthodox
- Fighting out of: Temple Hills, Maryland, U.S.
- Team: Team Lloyd Irvin
- Rank: brown belt in Brazilian Jiu-Jitsu under Lloyd Irvin Jr.
- Years active: 2011–2021 (MMA); 2010, 2022–present (boxing)

Professional boxing record
- Total: 4
- Wins: 2
- By knockout: 2
- Losses: 2

Mixed martial arts record
- Total: 19
- Wins: 13
- By knockout: 3
- By submission: 5
- By decision: 5
- Losses: 6
- By knockout: 5
- By decision: 1

Other information
- Boxing record from BoxRec
- Mixed martial arts record from Sherdog

James William Vick (born February 23, 1987) is an American former mixed martial artist who competed in the welterweight and lightweight divisions of the Ultimate Fighting Championship (UFC).

== Background ==
Vick was born to a modest Texan family on February 23, 1987. He grew up in Olney, Texas with his five siblings. Vick took up boxing following his senior year at Olney High School in 2005. Mixed martial arts piqued his interest initially when he saw The Ultimate Fighter 1 around the time he graduated from high school. Nevertheless, he wound up playing basketball in junior college only to be kicked out of the team due to physical altercations and eventually dropping out of college too.

After the failed attempt at college, Vick started training boxing under Jarred Kemp. Eventually, he became two-time Golden Gloves champion in the open division, winning the first title in 2007. Having already been training mixed martial arts during his amateur boxing tenure, Vick decided to drop off boxing in order to pursue an MMA career.

== Mixed martial arts career ==
After a 4-1 Amateur Record. Vick began his professional career fighting in regional shows in his home state of Texas. His first four fights all came in 2011, where he went undefeated with four straight wins.

=== The Ultimate Fighter ===
Vick was one of 32 lightweight fighters announced by the UFC to participate in the first live season of The Ultimate Fighter reality show.

Vick won his way into the house when he defeated Dakota Cochrane by split decision after one round. He was then chosen to be part of Team Cruz as Cruz's fifth pick and ninth overall.

For the first official fight of the show, he was chosen to fight Team Faber's third pick Daron Cruickshank. After a rough first part of the round, Vick landed a knee on Cruickshank as he shot in for a takedown, and won the fight by knockout in the first round.

His quarter-final fight came against Team Faber's Joe Proctor. Vick was able to dominate the fight, out-striking Proctor on the feet and successfully defending all of Proctor's take down attempts. Vick won the fight by unanimous decision, earning his way into the semi-final round.

Vick was selected to fight Team Faber fighter and eventual show winner, Michael Chiesa, in the semi-final round. Vick lost the fight via TKO in the second round.

=== Ultimate Fighting Championship ===
Vick was scheduled to face castmate Vinc Pichel on June 1, 2012, at The Ultimate Fighter: Live Finale. However, due to his TKO loss in the semifinals, Vick was unable to compete at the event and Pichel was pulled from the card as well.

In his official debut, Vick faced Ramsey Nijem on August 17, 2013, at UFC Fight Night 26. He won the fight via submission at just 58 seconds into the first round.

Vick was expected to face promotional newcomer Valmir Lazaro on August 2, 2014, at UFC 176. However, after UFC 176 was cancelled, Vick/Lazaro was rescheduled and eventually took place on August 23, 2014, at UFC Fight Night 49. He won the back-and-forth fight via unanimous decision.

Vick faced Nick Hein on November 22, 2014, at UFC Fight Night 57. Vick won the fight by unanimous decision.

Vick faced Jake Matthews on May 10, 2015, at UFC Fight Night 65. Vick won the fight via submission in the first round. The win also earned Vick his first Performance of the Night bonus award.

Vick next faced Glaico França on April 23, 2016, at UFC 197. He won the fight by unanimous decision.

Vick was expected to face Evan Dunham on June 4, 2016, at UFC 199, filling in for an injured Leonardo Santos. In turn, Dunham pulled out for undisclosed reasons and was replaced by Beneil Dariush. He lost the fight via knockout in the first round.

Vick was scheduled to face Johnny Case on February 4, 2017, at UFC Fight Night 104. However On January 19, Case pulled out the fight citing injury and was replaced by Abel Trujillo. Vick won by submission via submission in the third round.

Vick faced Polo Reyes on May 13, 2017, at UFC 211. He won the fight via TKO in the first round. After the bout with Reyes, Vick signed a new, four-fight contract with UFC.

Vick faced Joseph Duffy on November 4, 2017, at UFC 217. He won the fight via TKO in the second round.

Vick faced Francisco Trinaldo on February 18, 2018, at UFC Fight Night: Cowboy vs. Medeiros. He won the fight via unanimous decision.

Vick was scheduled to face Paul Felder on July 14, 2018, at UFC Fight Night 133. However, Vick was pulled from that fight in favor of a main event bout with Justin Gaethje on August 25, 2018, at UFC Fight Night 135. He lost the fight via KO in the first round.

Vick faced Paul Felder on February 17, 2019, at UFC on ESPN 1. He lost via unanimous decision.

Vick faced Dan Hooker on July 20, 2019, at UFC on ESPN 4. He lost the fight via knockout in the first round. Subsequently, Vick announced he will be moving up to the welterweight division.

Vick faced Niko Price on October 12, 2019, at UFC on ESPN+ 19. He lost the fight via knockout in the first round.

Following this fight, Vick's contract expired and the UFC elected not to renew it, making him a free agent.

=== Post-UFC career ===
Following his release from the UFC, Vick fought André Fialho at XMMA event on January 30, 2021. Vick lost the fight by second-round technical knockout. Vick announced his retirement after the loss, stating:

.... One of my main reasons for still fighting was to prove to my son that you can’t just give up when things get hard in life. But this is not the way to teach him that. This is not like failing a test or losing a basketball or football game. This is combat sports and this shit can be permanent. One of the last punches he landed i knew something was seriously wrong. I’m glad the ref stepped in because lord knows I would have been too tough and dumb to do that. My orbital is broke on my right side, the fracture went all the way through to the other side causing a bilateral break, plus my jaw is completely displaced so tomorrow they are finally doing surgery to fix it.....

== Professional boxing career ==
After a successful amateur boxing career, Vick turned professional in 2010, losing his debut via majority decision. Following retirement from mixed martial arts after a decade in the sport, Vick returned to boxing in 2022. He faced Simon Alejandro Heredia Cortes on March 26, 2022, and won the bout via second-round technical knockout. Nearly two months later on May 5, 2022, Vick stepped into the ring with Robert Lartigue and won the fight again via second-round technical knockout. Vick last fought Rodrigo Octavio Gonzalez on September 24, 2022, losing the fight via decision.

== Karate Combat ==
On October 29, 2022, Vick would debut with Karate Combat, suffering a unanimous decision loss to Jorge Perez.

Returning to the promotion on April 1, 2023, Vick secured his first Karate Combat win via unanimous decision against opponent Gabriele Cera.

Vick most recently faced Rafael Alves at Karate Combat 47 on June 29, 2024, suffering a KO loss via head kick.

Vick’s record with the promotion stands at 1-2-0.

== Personal life ==
James and his wife Ada have a son, James Jr (born 2018).

== Championships and accomplishments ==
- Ultimate Fighting Championship
  - Performance of the Night (One time) vs. Jake Matthews
  - The Ultimate Fighter Semi Finalist
  - UFC.com Awards
    - 2015: Ranked #7 Upset of the Year vs. Jake Matthews

== Mixed martial arts record ==
Professional record breakdown
| 19 matches | 13 wins | 6 losses |
| By knockout | 3 | 5 |
| By submission | 5 | 0 |
| By decision | 5 | 1 |

| Res. | Record | Opponent | Method | Event | Date | Round | Time | Location | Notes |
|---|---|---|---|---|---|---|---|---|---|
| Loss | 13–6 | André Fialho | TKO (punches) | XMMA: Vick vs Fialho | January 30, 2021 | 2 | 2:21 | West Palm Beach, Florida, United States | |
| Loss | 13–5 | Niko Price | KO (upkick) | UFC Fight Night: Joanna vs. Waterson | October 12, 2019 | 1 | 1:44 | Tampa, Florida, United States | Return to Welterweight. |
| Loss | 13–4 | Dan Hooker | KO (punch) | UFC on ESPN: dos Anjos vs. Edwards | July 20, 2019 | 1 | 2:33 | San Antonio, Texas, United States | |
| Loss | 13–3 | Paul Felder | Decision (unanimous) | UFC on ESPN: Ngannou vs. Velasquez | February 17, 2019 | 3 | 5:00 | Phoenix, Arizona, United States | |
| Loss | 13–2 | Justin Gaethje | KO (punches) | UFC Fight Night: Gaethje vs. Vick | August 25, 2018 | 1 | 1:27 | Lincoln, Nebraska, United States | |
| Win | 13–1 | Francisco Trinaldo | Decision (unanimous) | UFC Fight Night: Cowboy vs. Medeiros | February 18, 2018 | 3 | 5:00 | Austin, Texas, United States | |
| Win | 12–1 | Joseph Duffy | TKO (punches) | UFC 217 | November 4, 2017 | 2 | 4:59 | New York City, New York, United States | |
| Win | 11–1 | Polo Reyes | TKO (punches) | UFC 211 | May 13, 2017 | 1 | 2:39 | Dallas, Texas, United States | |
| Win | 10–1 | Abel Trujillo | Submission (D'Arce choke) | UFC Fight Night: Bermudez vs. The Korean Zombie | February 4, 2017 | 3 | 0:49 | Houston, Texas, United States | |
| Loss | 9–1 | Beneil Dariush | KO (punch) | UFC 199 | June 4, 2016 | 1 | 4:16 | Inglewood, California, United States | |
| Win | 9–0 | Glaico França | Decision (unanimous) | UFC 197 | April 23, 2016 | 3 | 5:00 | Las Vegas, Nevada, United States | |
| Win | 8–0 | Jake Matthews | Submission (guillotine choke) | UFC Fight Night: Miocic vs. Hunt | May 10, 2015 | 1 | 4:53 | Adelaide, Australia | Performance of the Night. |
| Win | 7–0 | Nick Hein | Decision (unanimous) | UFC Fight Night: Edgar vs. Swanson | November 22, 2014 | 3 | 5:00 | Austin, Texas, United States | |
| Win | 6–0 | Valmir Lazaro | Decision (unanimous) | UFC Fight Night: Henderson vs. dos Anjos | August 23, 2014 | 3 | 5:00 | Tulsa, Oklahoma, United States | |
| Win | 5–0 | Ramsey Nijem | Submission (guillotine choke) | UFC Fight Night: Shogun vs. Sonnen | August 17, 2013 | 1 | 0:58 | Boston, Massachusetts, United States | |
| Win | 4–0 | Chris Pecero | Decision (unanimous) | Back Alley Promotions | September 3, 2011 | 3 | 5:00 | Arlington, Texas, United States | |
| Win | 3–0 | Mike Salazar | TKO (punches) | STFC 16 - All or Nothing | August 12, 2011 | 1 | 2:17 | McAllen, Texas, United States | Welterweight bout. |
| Win | 2–0 | Jimmy Taylor | Submission (armbar) | Xtreme Knockout 11 | July 23, 2011 | 1 | 1:56 | Arlington, Texas, United States | |
| Win | 1–0 | Cody Carrillo | Submission (rear-naked choke) | Undisputed MMA 1 | June 18, 2011 | 1 | 3:30 | Amarillo, Texas, United States | |

=== Mixed martial arts exhibition record ===
| Exhibition record breakdown | | |
| 4 matches | 3 wins | 1 loss |
| By knockout | 1 | 1 |
| By decision | 2 | 0 |

| Res. | Record | Opponent | Method | Event | Date | Round | Time | Location | Notes |
|---|---|---|---|---|---|---|---|---|---|
| Loss | 3–1 | Michael Chiesa | TKO (punches) | The Ultimate Fighter: Live | May 12, 2012 (Live airdate) | 2 | 1:55 | Las Vegas, Nevada, United States | The Ultimate Fighter: Live Semi-Final round. |
| Win | 3–0 | Joe Proctor | Decision (unanimous) | The Ultimate Fighter: Live | May 11, 2012 (Live airdate) | 3 | 5:00 | Las Vegas, Nevada, United States | The Ultimate Fighter: Live Quarter-Final round. |
| Win | 2–0 | Daron Cruickshank | KO (knee) | The Ultimate Fighter: Live | March 16, 2012 (Live airdate) | 1 | 2:16 | Las Vegas, Nevada, United States | The Ultimate Fighter: Live Preliminary round. |
| Win | 1–0 | Dakota Cochrane | Decision (split) | The Ultimate Fighter: Live | March 9, 2012 (Live airdate) | 1 | 5:00 | Las Vegas, Nevada, United States | The Ultimate Fighter: Live Elimination round. |

== Professional boxing record ==
| 4 fights | 2 wins | 2 losses |
|---|---|---|
| By knockout | 2 | 0 |
| By decision | 0 | 2 |

| No. | Result | Record | Opponent | Method | Round, time | Date | Location | Notes |
|---|---|---|---|---|---|---|---|---|
| 4 | Loss | 2–2 | (Mexico) Rodrigo Octavio Gonzalez | MD | 4 | September 24, 2022 | (United States) Indoor Soccer World, Mesquite, Texas, U.S. | |
| 3 | Win | 2–1 | (United States) Robert Lartigue | TKO | 2 (4), 2:31 | May 5, 2022 | (United States) La Hacienda Event Center, Midland, Texas, U.S. | |
| 2 | Win | 1–1 | (Mexico) Simon Alejandro Heredia Cortes | TKO | 2 (4), 1:39 | March 26, 2022 | (United States) Mesquite Arena, Mesquite, Texas, U.S. | |
| 1 | Loss | 0–1 | (United States) Salvador Roa | MD | 4 | March 6, 2010 | (United States) Music Hall, Austin, Texas, U.S. | |

== Professional kickboxing record ==
Professional record breakdown
| 1 match | 1 win | 0 losses |
| By decision | 1 | 0 |

| Res. | Record | Opponent | Method | Event | Date | Round | Time | Location | Notes |
|---|---|---|---|---|---|---|---|---|---|
| Win | 1–0 | Jeremiah Truhler | Decision (unanimous) | | May 15, 2023 | 3 | 3:00 | West Palm Beach, Florida, United States | |

== Karate Combat Record ==
Professional record breakdown
| 3 matches | 1 win | 2 losses |
| By knockout | 0 | 1 |
| By decision | 1 | 1 |

| Res. | Record | Opponent | Method | Event | Date | Round | Time | Location | Notes |
|---|---|---|---|---|---|---|---|---|---|
| Loss | 1–2 | Rafael Alves | KO (switch kick) | Karate Combat 47 | June 29, 2024 | 1 | 1:24 | Orlando, Florida, United States | |
| Win | 1–1 | Gabriele Cera | Decision (unanimous) | Karate Combat 38 | April 1, 2023 | 3 | 3:00 | Miami, Florida, United States | |
| Loss | 0–1 | Jorge Perez | Decision (unanimous) | Karate Combat 36 | October 29, 2022 | 3 | 3:00 | Orlando, Florida, United States | |

== See also ==
- List of male mixed martial artists
