= UFC 197 =

UFC mixed martial arts event in 2016

UFC 197: Jones vs. Saint Preux
- The poster for UFC 197: Jones vs. Saint Preux
- Promotion: Ultimate Fighting Championship
- Date: April 23, 2016
- Venue: MGM Grand Garden Arena
- City: Las Vegas, Nevada
- Attendance: 11,352
- Total gate: $2,300,000

Event chronology
UFC on Fox: Teixeira vs. Evans	UFC 197: Jones vs. Saint Preux	UFC Fight Night: Overeem vs. Arlovski

UFC 197: Jones vs. Saint Preux was a mixed martial arts event held on April 23, 2016, at MGM Grand Garden Arena in Las Vegas, Nevada.

== Background ==
The event's number was initially planned for an event taking place on March 5, 2016 at HSBC Arena in Rio de Janeiro, Brazil, before being cancelled on December 29, 2015 and moved to MGM Grand Garden Arena in Las Vegas, Nevada, to take place on February 6, 2016; the February event became UFC Fight Night: Hendricks vs. Thompson rather than a numbered pay-per-view after Vitor Belfort declined to fight Anderson Silva, and the March show was renumbered as UFC 196.

The UFC hoped to contest the event at Madison Square Garden in New York City, in what would be the first event in the state of New York since the state's MMA ban. However, on January 25, it was announced that a preliminary injunction allowing the promotion to hold the event was denied by a federal judge. According to an order issued by New York district court judge Kimba M. Wood, the federal court must first rule on Zuffa's appeal on New York's MMA ban and won't interfere with the enforcement of state law. On February 6, the UFC confirmed the event would take place in Las Vegas, Nevada.

The event was expected to be headlined by a UFC Light Heavyweight Championship rematch between then champion Daniel Cormier and former champion Jon Jones. The pairing met previously at UFC 182 in January 2015 with Jones defending his title via unanimous decision. Subsequent to that victory, Jones was stripped of the title and suspended indefinitely from the UFC in connection with a hit-and-run incident that he was involved in. Cormier replaced him and went on to defeat Anthony Johnson at UFC 187 to win the vacant title.

On March 29, Jones was arrested in Albuquerque, New Mexico on a charge of violating his probation related to his hit-and-run incident in 2015. The arrest took place five days after Jones was cited on multiple traffic charges, including drag racing, exhibition driving, weaving, failing to properly display his license plate and modifying his exhaust pipe. He agreed to a plea deal and was released on March 31. In a statement, the UFC announced it was "disappointed" with Jones, but the bout would continue as planned. However, on April 1, it was announced that Cormier injured his foot and was out of the planned fight. He was replaced by Ovince Saint Preux in what became an interim title fight. Anthony Johnson was the original planned replacement, but due to a recent oral procedure, he wasn't able to accept the fight.

A UFC Flyweight Championship bout between current champion Demetrious Johnson and 2008 Olympic gold medalist in freestyle wrestling Henry Cejudo co-headlined the event.

In January 2016, B.J. Penn announced his intentions to return to active competition in the featherweight division after an 18-month "retirement" and was expected to compete at this event. However, Penn's return was delayed after an investigation into recent criminal allegations made against him was launched. After he was exonerated, the UFC announced that he would face Dennis Siver at UFC 199.

Former WSOF Women's Strawweight Champion Jessica Aguilar was expected to face Juliana Lima at the event, but pulled out on March 18 due to a knee injury. She was replaced by former UFC Women's Strawweight Champion Carla Esparza.

== Results ==
Main Card
Weight class				Method	Round	Time	Notes
Light Heavyweight	Jon Jones	def.	Ovince Saint Preux	Decision (unanimous) (50–44, 50–45, 50–45)	5	5:00	(Note: For the interim UFC Light Heavyweight Championship.)
Flyweight	Demetrious Johnson (c)	def.	Henry Cejudo	TKO (knees and punches)	1	2:49	(Note: For the UFC Flyweight Championship.)
Lightweight	Edson Barboza	def.	Anthony Pettis	Decision (unanimous) (29–28, 29–28, 30–27)	3	5:00
Middleweight	Robert Whittaker	def.	Rafael Natal	Decision (unanimous) (29–28, 30–27, 30–27)	3	5:00
Featherweight	Yair Rodríguez	def.	Andre Fili	KO (head kick)	2	2:15
Preliminary Card (Fox Sports 1)
Flyweight	Sergio Pettis	def.	Chris Kelades	Decision (unanimous) (30–27, 30–27, 30–27)	3	5:00
Welterweight	Danny Roberts	def.	Dominique Steele	Decision (unanimous) (29–28, 29–28, 29–28)	3	5:00
Women's Strawweight	Carla Esparza	def.	Juliana Lima	Decision (unanimous) (30–27, 30–27, 30–27)	3	5:00
Lightweight	James Vick	def.	Glaico França	Decision (unanimous) (29–28, 29–28, 30–27)	3	5:00
Preliminary Card (UFC Fight Pass)
Heavyweight	Walt Harris	def.	Cody East	TKO (punches)	1	4:18
Light Heavyweight	Marcos Rogério de Lima	def.	Clint Hester	Submission (arm-triangle choke)	1	4:35
Lightweight	Kevin Lee	def.	Efraín Escudero	Decision (unanimous) (29–28, 29–28, 29–28)	3	5:00

== Bonus awards ==
The following fighters were awarded $50,000 bonuses:

- Fight of the Night: Danny Roberts vs. Dominique Steele
- Performance of the Night: Demetrious Johnson and Yair Rodríguez

== Reported payout ==
The following is the reported payout to the fighters as reported to the Nevada State Athletic Commission. It does not include sponsor money and also does not include the UFC's traditional "fight night" bonuses.

- Jon Jones: $500,000 (no win bonus) def. Ovince Saint Preux: $55,000
- Demetrious Johnson: $195,000 (includes $60,000 win bonus) def. Henry Cejudo: $60,000
- Edson Barboza: $88,000 (includes $44,000 win bonus) def. Anthony Pettis: $80,000
- Robert Whittaker: $60,000 (includes $30,000 win bonus) def. Rafael Natal: $41,000
- Yair Rodríguez: $42,000 (includes $21,000 win bonus) def. Andre Fili: $18,000
- Sergio Pettis: $48,000 (includes $24,000 win bonus) def. Chris Kelades: $12,000
- Danny Roberts: $24,000 (includes $12,000 win bonus) def. Dominique Steele: $12,000
- Carla Esparza: $60,000 (includes $30,000 win bonus) def. Juliana Lima: $14,000
- James Vick: $30,000 (includes $15,000 win bonus) def. Glaico França: $17,000
- Walt Harris: $20,000 (includes $10,000 win bonus) def. Cody East: $10,000
- Marcos Rogério de Lima: $24,000 (includes $12,000 win bonus) def. Clint Hester: $12,000
- Kevin Lee: $48,000 (includes $24,000 win bonus) def. Efrain Escudero: $18,000

== See also ==
- List of UFC events
- 2016 in UFC
