= Frankie Perez =

Mixed martial artist

- Born: May 11, 1989 (age 37); Wallington, New Jersey, U.S.
- Nationality: American
- Height: 5 ft 11 in (1.80 m)
- Weight: 155 lb (70 kg; 11.1 st)
- Division: Lightweight
- Reach: 73 in (190 cm)
- Fighting out of: Howell, New Jersey, U.S.
- Team: Ricardo Almeida Jiu Jitsu
- Rank: Brown belt in Brazilian Jiu Jitsu
- Years active: 2010–present (MMA)

Mixed martial arts record
- Total: 15
- Wins: 11
- By knockout: 2
- By submission: 6
- By decision: 3
- Losses: 4
- By knockout: 1
- By decision: 3

Other information
- Mixed martial arts record from Sherdog

Frankie Perez (born May 11, 1989) is a mixed martial artist specializing in Brazilian jiu-jitsu who has competed in both the Ultimate Fighting Championship, as well as World Series of Fighting.

Originally from Wallington, Perez moved to Howell Township, New Jersey, where he attended Howell High School.

== Mixed martial arts record ==
Professional record breakdown
15 matches	11 wins	4 losses
By knockout	3	1
By submission	6	0
By decision	2	3

Res.	Record	Opponent	Method	Event	Date	Round	Time	Location	Notes
Win	11–4	Jerome Mickle	Submission (rear-naked choke)	Ring of Combat 63	Jun 08, 2018	1	3:39	Atlantic City, New Jersey, United States	
Loss	10–4	Chris Wade	Decision (unanimous)	UFC on Fox: Weidman vs. Gastelum	Jul 22, 2017	3	5:00	Long Island, New York, United States	
Loss	10–3	Marc Diakiese	Decision (unanimous)	UFC Fight Night: Lewis vs. Abdurakhimov	Dec 9, 2016	3	5:00	Albany, New York, United States	
Win	10–2	Sam Stout	TKO (punches)	UFC Fight Night: Holloway vs. Oliveira	Aug 23, 2015	1	0:54	Saskatoon, Saskatchewan, Canada	
Loss	9–2	Johnny Case	TKO (punches)	UFC Fight Night: McGregor vs. Siver	Jan 18, 2015	3	1:54	Boston, Massachusetts, United States	
Win	9-1	Tom Marcellino	Decision (unanimous)	World Series of Fighting 13: Moraes vs. Bollinger	Jun 28, 2014	3	5:00	Bethlehem, Pennsylvania, United States	
Loss	8-1	Chris Wade	Decision (split)	Ring of Combat 48	May 16, 2014	3	5:00	Atlantic City, New Jersey, United States	
Win	8-0	Mike Santiago	Submission (rear-naked choke)	Ring of Combat 47	Jan 24, 2014	1	1:15	Atlantic City, New Jersey, United States	
Win	7-0	Rafael Fagundes Machado	Submission (rear-naked choke)	Ring of Combat 46	Sep 20, 2013	1	2:20	Atlantic City, New Jersey, United States	
Win	6-0	Adam Townsend	Decision (unanimous)	Ring of Combat 45	June 14, 2013	3	4:00	Atlantic City, New Jersey, United States	
Win	5-0	Alfred Walker	Submission (arm-triangle choke)	Ring of Combat 43	Jan 24, 2013	2	2:36	Atlantic City, New Jersey, United States	
Win	4-0	Ben Syers	TKO (punches)	Ring of Combat 41	Jun 15, 2012	2	1:22	Atlantic City, New Jersey, United States	
Win	3-0	Jeremy Uy	Decision (unanimous)	Ring of Combat 39	Feb 10, 2012	2	4:00	Atlantic City, New Jersey, United States	
Win	2-0	Allen Cozze	Submission (guillotine choke)	Ring of Combat 38	Nov 18, 2011	1	1:09	Atlantic City, New Jersey, United States	
Win	1-0	Andre Shuler	Submission (rear-naked choke)	Ring of Combat 36	Jun 17, 2011	1	2:32	Atlantic City, New Jersey, United States	
