= Sage Northcutt =

American mixed martial artist (born 1996)

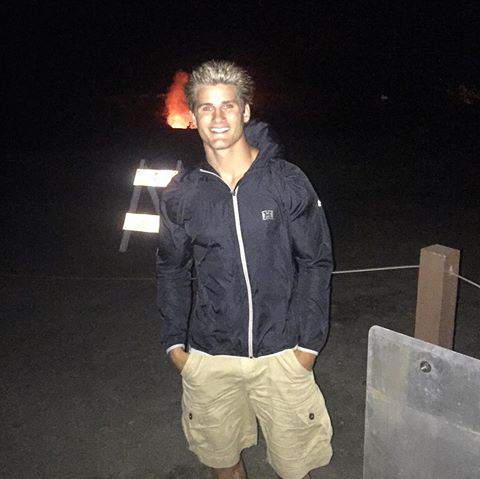
- Northcutt in 2015
- Born: March 1, 1996 (age 30)
- Nickname: Super
- Nationality: American
- Height: 6 ft 0 in (1.83 m)
- Weight: 170 lb (77 kg; 12 st 2 lb)
- Division: Lightweight (2015–2018) (Note: ONE refers to their 155 lb division as Featherweight, but per the Association of Boxing Commissions in the United States, 155 lbs is considered Lightweight.); Welterweight (2014–present) (Note: ONE refers to their 170 lb division as Lightweight, but per the Association of Boxing Commissions in the United States, 170 lbs is considered Welterweight.); Middleweight (2019) (Note: ONE refers to their 185 lb division as Welterweight, but per the Association of Boxing Commissions in the United States, 185 lbs is considered Middleweight.)
- Reach: 71.5 in (182 cm)
- Fighting out of: Sacramento, California, U.S.
- Team: Team Alpha Male
- Trainer: Urijah Faber
- Rank: 4th dan black belt in Kajukenbo; 3rd dan black belt in Taekwondo; Brown Belt in Brazilian Jiu-Jitsu
- Wrestling: NCWA Wrestling
- Years active: 2014–present

Kickboxing record
- Total: 15
- Wins: 15

Mixed martial arts record
- Total: 15
- Wins: 12
- By knockout: 5
- By submission: 4
- By decision: 3
- Losses: 3
- By knockout: 1
- By submission: 2

Other information
- University: Texas A&M University
- Spouse: Amanda Leighton
- Notable school: Seven Lakes High School Katy High School
- Mixed martial arts record from Sherdog
- Last updated on: May 17, 2019

Sage Northcutt (born March 1, 1996) is an American professional mixed martial artist who is currently competing in the Welterweight division and is currently signed to Karate Combat. He has competed for the Ultimate Fighting Championship (UFC) and ONE Championship.

== Background ==
Northcutt has been training MMA since the age of four and competed all over the world from a young age. His father, Mark, is a black belt in shuri-ryū karate, and his older sister, Colbey, is an amateur kickboxing champion and a professional mixed martial artist currently signed to ONE Championship. At the age of 9, Northcutt became the youngest person ever to be on the cover of Sport Karate Magazine. Northcutt has won a total of 77 world youth championships in karate. He was also an undefeated kickboxer, with his record standing at 15–0.

Northcutt attended Seven Lakes High School for his first two years of high school before transferring to Katy High School during his sophomore year. Northcutt was inducted into the Black Belt Magazine Hall of Fame in 2012 at age 15. In high school Northcutt trained and competed in wrestling, and also trained with Texas A&M university’s NCWA wrestling club before dropping out to pursue his mixed martial arts career.

== Mixed martial arts career ==
=== Early career ===
In 2013, Northcutt began competing on the Legacy Fighting Championship amateur mixed martial arts (MMA) series, amassing an amateur record of 5-1 with his only loss coming on his first bout against Charles Sheppard by technical-knockout (TKO) in the first round. At the age of 18, he turned pro and racked up a 5–0 record in 16 months.

=== Ultimate Fighting Championship ===
Northcutt was featured in the debut episode of Dana White's Looking For A Fight. After a victory at Legacy Fighting Championship 44, he was signed to the UFC.

In his UFC debut, Northcutt also made his lightweight debut when he faced Francisco Treviño on October 3, 2015, at UFC 192. He won via technical-knockout (TKO) in 57 seconds.

Northcutt's second UFC fight was against Cody Pfister on December 10, 2015, at UFC Fight Night 80. Northcutt won the fight via guillotine choke in the second round.

Northcutt was expected to face Andrew Holbrook on January 30, 2016, at UFC on Fox 18. However, after Holbrook withdrew from the bout citing an injury eight days prior to the event, Northcutt would instead make his welterweight debut against Bryan Barberena. Northcutt lost the bout via submission (arm-triangle choke) in the second round.

Northcutt made a return to lightweight and faced Enrique Marín on July 9, 2016, at UFC 200, where he won via unanimous decision.

Northcutt had his second welterweight bout when he faced Mickey Gall on December 17, 2016, at UFC on Fox 22. He lost the contest via submission in the second round.

Northcutt was expected to face Claudio Puelles in a lightweight bout on July 29, 2017, at UFC 214. However, Puelles pulled out of the fight in mid-June citing injury and was replaced by John Makdessi. In turn, the fight was canceled on July 14 due to injuries to both fighters.

Northcutt faced Michel Quiñones on November 11, 2017, at UFC Fight Night 120. He won the fight via unanimous decision.

Northcutt faced Thibault Gouti on February 18, 2018, at UFC Fight Night 126. He won the fight via unanimous decision.

Northcutt faced Zak Ottow on July 14, 2018, at UFC Fight Night 133. He won the fight via knockout in the second round. Appearing on The Ariel Helwani Show early September 2018, Northcutt confirmed his contract expired following the fight with Ottow, making him a free agent. In the same appearance, Northcutt said he planned to listen for offers from various promotions.

On November 26, 2018, Dana White confirmed on UFC Unfiltered that the UFC did not opt to renew Sage Northcutt's contract. White cited reasons, claiming, "Sage is young, and Sage needs some work. Let him get some work in some other organizations, and we will see where this kid ends up in a couple of years. Maybe we will pick him back up again."

=== ONE Championship ===
On November 30, 2018, it was announced that Northcutt had signed with ONE Championship. On February 26, 2019, it was announced that Northcutt was scheduled to make his promotional debut against Cosmo Alexandre on May 17, 2019, in ONE: Enter the Dragon. Northcutt lost the fight by knockout 29 seconds into the first round, marking his first professional loss by knockout. The blow resulted in eight facial fractures which required prompt surgical repair.

On November 22, 2019, Northcutt announced that he would be moving down two weight classes to compete at lightweight (155 lbs) in ONE Championship. “I learned my lesson about fighting a weight class too big, going back down to 155, and it’ll be better for me,” Northcutt said in an interview with MMA News.

Northcutt was scheduled to fight Shinya Aoki in a Lightweight bout, after a near two-year layoff, at ONE on TNT 4, on April 28, 2021. However, Northcutt withdrew from the bout due to lingering COVID-19 effects and was replaced by Eduard Folayang.

Almost four years after his loss to Alexandre, Northcutt faced Ahmed Mujtaba on May 5, 2023, at ONE Fight Night 10. Northcutt was dropped by a strike from Mutjaba early in the fight, but managed to win the fight with a heel hook submission 39 seconds into the first round. The submission finish was awarded 'Performance of the Night.

Northcutt was scheduled to face Shinya Aoki on January 28, 2024, at ONE 165. However, Northcutt withdrew during the event because his cornermen were reportedly denied visas, and was replaced by John Lineker in a openweight bout.

On October 18, 2024, it was announced that Northcutt had left ONE Championship.

=== Professional Fighters League ===
On December 12, 2024, it was reported that Northcutt had signed with the Professional Fighters League after not competing in 2024.

=== Global Fight League ===
Northcutt was scheduled to face Lucas Martins in the inaugural Global Fight League event on May 24, 2025 at GFL 1. However, all GFL events were cancelled indefinitely.

== Personal life ==
Northcutt was majoring in petroleum engineering at Texas A&M University. In January 2017, Northcutt announced he would withdraw from Texas A&M University to train mixed martial arts full-time. Northcutt is a Christian. Northcutt married actress Amanda Leighton on December 5, 2020.

== Championships and accomplishments ==
- Ultimate Fighting Championship
  - UFC.com Awards
    - 2015: Ranked #3 Newcomer of the Year
- ONE Championship
  - Performance of the Night (One time) vs. Ahmed Mujtaba
- Black Belt magazine
  - 2012 Competitor of the Year
  - 2015 MMA Fighter of the Year

== Mixed martial arts record ==
Professional record breakdown
15 matches	12 wins	3 losses
By knockout	5	1
By submission	4	2
By decision	3	0

Res.	Record	Opponent	Method	Event	Date	Round	Time	Location	Notes
Win	12–3	Ahmed Mujtaba	Submission (heel hook)	ONE Fight Night 10	May 5, 2023	1	0:39	Broomfield, Colorado, United States	Return to Welterweight. Performance of the Night.
Loss	11–3	Cosmo Alexandre	KO (punch)	ONE: Enter the Dragon	May 17, 2019	1	0:29	Kallang, Singapore	Middleweight debut.
Win	11–2	Zak Ottow	KO (punches)	UFC Fight Night: dos Santos vs. Ivanov	July 14, 2018	2	3:13	Boise, Idaho, United States	Welterweight bout.
Win	10–2	Thibault Gouti	Decision (unanimous)	UFC Fight Night: Cowboy vs. Medeiros	February 18, 2018	3	5:00	Austin, Texas, United States	
Win	9–2	Michel Quiñones	Decision (unanimous)	UFC Fight Night: Poirier vs. Pettis	November 11, 2017	3	5:00	Norfolk, Virginia, United States	
Loss	8–2	Mickey Gall	Submission (rear-naked choke)	UFC on Fox: VanZant vs. Waterson	December 17, 2016	2	1:40	Sacramento, California, United States	Welterweight bout.
Win	8–1	Enrique Marín	Decision (unanimous)	UFC 200	July 9, 2016	3	5:00	Las Vegas, Nevada, United States	
Loss	7–1	Bryan Barberena	Submission (arm-triangle choke)	UFC on Fox: Johnson vs. Bader	January 30, 2016	2	3:06	Newark, New Jersey, United States	Welterweight bout.
Win	7–0	Cody Pfister	Submission (guillotine choke)	UFC Fight Night: Namajunas vs. VanZant	December 10, 2015	2	0:41	Las Vegas, Nevada, United States	Lightweight debut.
Win	6–0	Francisco Treviño	TKO (elbows and punches)	UFC 192	October 3, 2015	1	0:57	Houston, Texas, United States	Catchweight (160 lb) bout.
Win	5–0	Rocky Long	Submission (neck crank)	Legacy FC 44	August 28, 2015	2	3:30	Houston, Texas, United States	Catchweight (165 lb) bout.
Win	4–0	Gage Duhon	Submission (rear-naked choke)	Legacy FC 42	November 22, 2014	1	4:26	Lake Charles, Louisiana, United States	Catchweight (165 lb) bout.
Win	3–0	James Christopherson	TKO (punches)	Fury Fighting 6	May 22, 2014	1	4:35	Humble, Texas, United States	Welterweight debut.
Win	2–0	Jacob Capelli	TKO (punches)	Legacy FC: Challenger Series 1	April 25, 2014	1	0:55	Houston, Texas, United States	Catchweight (165 lb) bout.
Win	1–0	Tim Lashley	TKO (wheel kick and punches)	Legacy FC 37	April 20, 2014	1	0:27	Houston, Texas, United States	Catchweight (165 lb) bout.

== See also ==
- List of current PFL fighters
- List of male mixed martial artists
