= UFC 192 =

UFC flagship event in 2015

UFC 192: Cormier vs. Gustafsson
- The poster for UFC 192: Cormier vs. Gustafsson
- Promotion: Ultimate Fighting Championship
- Date: October 3, 2015
- Venue: Toyota Center
- City: Houston, Texas, United States
- Attendance: 14,622
- Total gate: $1,859,000
- Buyrate: 250,000

Event chronology
UFC Fight Night: Barnett vs. Nelson	UFC 192: Cormier vs. Gustafsson	UFC Fight Night: Holohan vs. Smolka

UFC 192: Cormier vs. Gustafsson was a mixed martial arts event held on October 3, 2015, at the Toyota Center in Houston, Texas.

== Background ==
The event was the fourth that the promotion has hosted in Houston, and the first since UFC 166 in 2013.

The event was headlined by a UFC Light Heavyweight Championship bout between current champion Daniel Cormier and top contender Alexander Gustafsson. The bout was initially linked as the event headliner for UFC 191. However, the bout was postponed to this event as a result of Cormier's knee injury.

Leslie Smith was expected to face Raquel Pennington at this event. However, Smith was forced to pull out of the event due to injury and Pennington was rebooked against a separate opponent at another event.

Anthony Hamilton was expected to face Derrick Lewis at the event. However, Hamilton was pulled from the bout and replaced by Viktor Pešta.

Johny Hendricks was set to face Tyron Woodley in the co-main event. However, Hendricks pulled out of the fight on the day of the weigh-ins due to a kidney stone and intestinal blockage suffered during his weight cut. Therefore, the fight was canceled.

Francisco Treviño missed weight on his first attempt at the weigh ins, coming in at 160 lb. He was given additional time to make the weight limit, but made no attempts to cut further. Instead, he was fined 20 percent of his fight purse, which went to Sage Northcutt.

On October 15, it was announced that Treviño tested positive for marijuana in post-fight tests. If Treviño was found by the Texas Department of Licensing and Regulation's enforcement division to have violated its rules, he would face a one-year probated suspension, in which he can still fight provided he does not break any more rules, or a full one-year suspension. He also faced up to a $5,000 fine.

This event also included the only fight as of 2026 that Islam Makhachev has lost, losing to Adriano Martins.

== Results ==
Main Card
Weight class				Method	Round	Time	Notes
Light Heavyweight	Daniel Cormier (c)	def.	Alexander Gustafsson	Decision (split) (47–48, 48–47, 49–46)	5	5:00	(Note: For the UFC Light Heavyweight Championship)
Light Heavyweight	Ryan Bader	def.	Rashad Evans	Decision (unanimous) (30–27, 30–27, 30–27)	3	5:00
Heavyweight	Ruslan Magomedov	def.	Shawn Jordan	Decision (unanimous) (30–27, 29–28, 30–27)	3	5:00
Flyweight	Joseph Benavidez	def.	Ali Bagautinov	Decision (unanimous) (30–27, 30–27, 29–28)	3	5:00
Women's Bantamweight	Julianna Peña	def.	Jessica Eye	Decision (unanimous) (29–27, 29–27, 29–27)	3	5:00	(Note: Eye was deducted one point in round 2 due to an illegal knee.)
Preliminary Card (Fox Sports 1)
Featherweight	Yair Rodríguez	def.	Dan Hooker	Decision (unanimous) (30–27, 30–27, 30–26)	3	5:00
Welterweight	Albert Tumenov	def.	Alan Jouban	TKO (head kick and punches)	1	2:55
Lightweight	Adriano Martins	def.	Islam Makhachev	KO (punch)	1	1:46
Women's Strawweight	Rose Namajunas	def.	Angela Hill	Submission (standing rear-naked choke)	1	2:47
Preliminary Card (UFC Fight Pass)
Catchweight (160 lb)	Sage Northcutt	def.	Francisco Treviño	TKO (elbows and punches)	1	0:57
Flyweight	Sergio Pettis	def.	Chris Cariaso	Decision (unanimous) (29–27, 29–27, 29–28)	3	5:00
Heavyweight	Derrick Lewis	def.	Viktor Pešta	TKO (punches)	3	1:15

== Bonus awards ==
The following fighters each received $50,000 bonuses:

- Fight of the Night: Daniel Cormier vs. Alexander Gustafsson
- Performance of the Night: Albert Tumenov and Adriano Martins

== See also ==
- List of UFC events
- 2015 in UFC
