= Josh Burkman =

American mixed martial artist (born 1980)

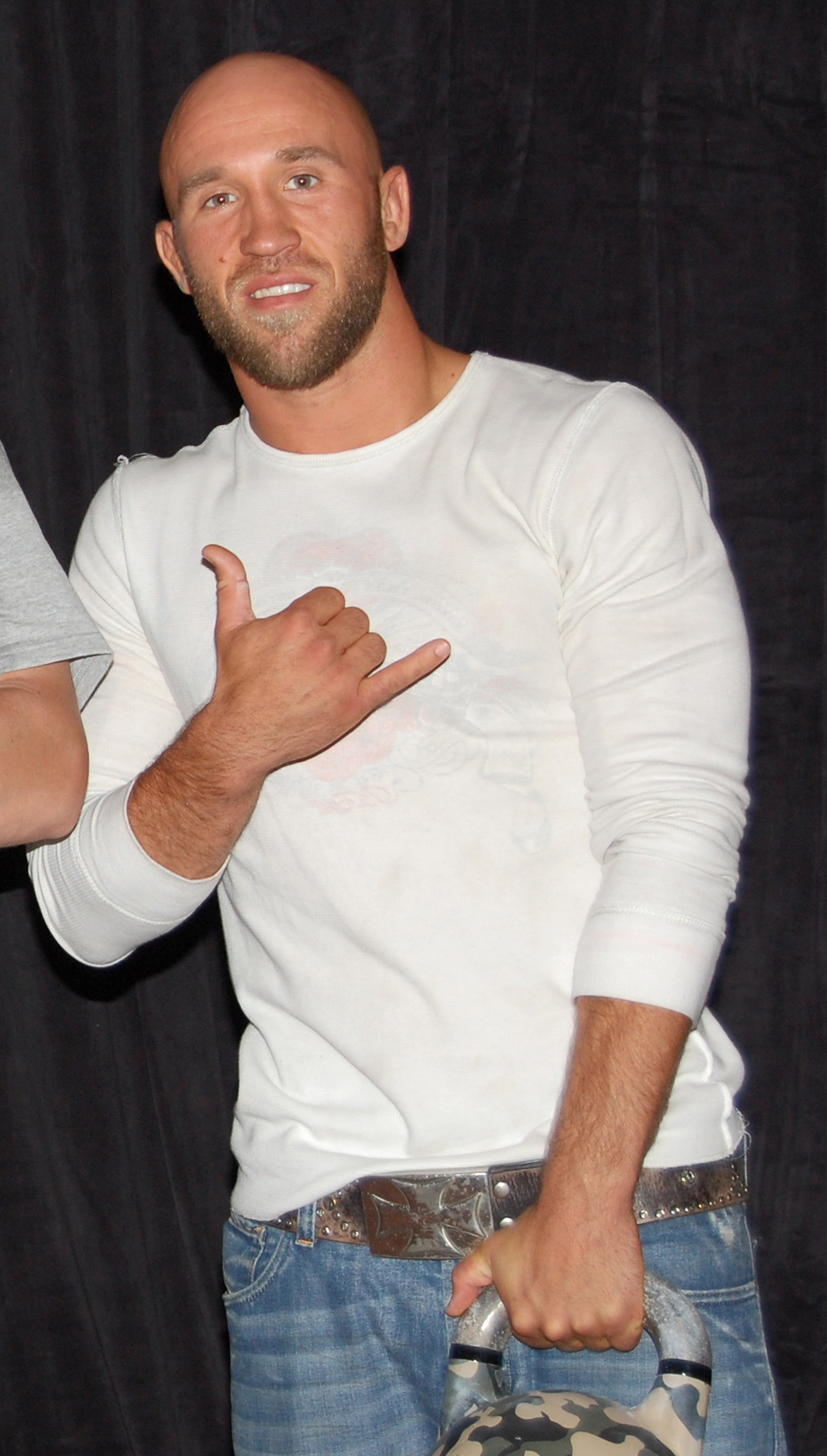
- Burkman in 2007
- Born: April 10, 1980 (age 46); Salt Lake City, Utah, U.S.
- Other names: The People's Warrior
- Height: 5 ft 10 in (1.78 m)
- Weight: 170 lb (77 kg; 12 st)
- Division: Middleweight; Welterweight; Lightweight
- Reach: 72 in (183 cm)
- Style: Wrestling
- Stance: Orthodox
- Fighting out of: Salt Lake City, Utah, U.S.
- Team: The Pit Elevated Fight Team
- Years active: 2003–2019

Mixed martial arts record
- Total: 47
- Wins: 28
- By knockout: 7
- By submission: 10
- By decision: 11
- Losses: 18
- By knockout: 2
- By submission: 9
- By decision: 7
- No contests: 1

Other information
- Mixed martial arts record from Sherdog

Josh Burkman (born April 10, 1980) is a retired American professional mixed martial artist formerly competing in the Welterweight division. He formerly competed in the Ultimate Fighting Championship, the World Series of Fighting, the XFC, and was a contestant on The Ultimate Fighter 2.

== Background ==
Burkman was born in Salt Lake City, Utah, he attended Cottonwood High School. He was a three-sport star athlete for the Colts. He was a Class 5A All-State third baseman on the baseball team, and was captain of the football team, where he rushed for over 1,000 yards as a senior. As a member of the wrestling team, he finished second place in the state championships in the 171-pound division.

Burkman played two seasons of college football before he began his career in mixed martial arts. He spent his freshman season at Snow College in Ephraim, Utah, but he missed half the season with an injury. Then he transferred to Dixie State College in St. George, Utah. His sophomore season (2001) was spectacular: he rushed for 1,439 yards and 13 touchdowns for the Rebels, earning JUCO All-American honors. His team won the Dixie Rotary Bowl; for his performance, Burkman earned a scholarship offer from the University of Utah. Ultimately, he decided to drop football and pursue mixed martial arts.

== Mixed martial arts career ==
=== Ultimate Fighting Championship ===
Burkman was originally chosen to be on the inaugural season of The Ultimate Fighter, but he failed pre-show drug test failure and admitted to taking Winstrol. He was later a contestant on The Ultimate Fighter 2 as part of Team Hughes.

Burkman was signed by the UFC and had his debut fight at The Ultimate Fighter 2 Finale; he defeated Sammy Morgan by knockout in 21 seconds of the first round.

During his time with the UFC, Burkman earned wins over Drew Fickett, Josh Neer, and Forrest Petz, but was largely unsuccessful against the bigger names in the division. After three back-to-back losses in 2008, Burkman was cut from the UFC with a record of 5 wins and 5 losses.

=== Showdown Fights ===
On November 20, 2009, Burkman faced Ultimate Fighter alumni Brandon Melendez defeating him by KO in round one at Throwdown Showdown 5.

On April 9, 2010, Burkman took on Jake Paul at Showdown Fights – Burkman vs. Paul winning via unanimous decision.

On September 24, 2010, Burkman faced undefeated Jordan Smith at Showdown Fights – Respect. Burkman won the fight via split decision.

On April 2, 2011, Burkman faced Canadian prospect Jordan Mein at MMA: The Reckoning in Orillia, Ontario, Canada, Burkman lost via unanimous decision.

On February 24, 2012, Burkman faced Koffi Adzitso at Showdown Fights – Breakout, Burkman won via unanimous decision.

On August 25, 2012, Burkman faced Ultimate Fighter alumni Jamie Yager at Showdown Fights - Burkman vs. Yager. Burkman won via guillotine choke submission.

=== World Series of Fighting ===
On September 6, 2012, it was announced that Burkman was one of many fighters to sign on with new MMA Promotion the World Series of Fighting. He faced Gerald Harris on November 3, 2012, at WSOF 1 and won via unanimous decision.

Burkman faced Aaron Simpson at World Series of Fighting 2 on March 23, 2013. He won the fight via KO due to a knee strike and punches in the first round.

Burkman faced Jon Fitch on June 14, 2013, at World Series of Fighting 3 in a rematch of their first fight in which Burkman lost to Fitch due to a rear naked choke. Burkman avenged his loss, dropping Fitch with a series of punches before applying a guillotine choke submission and getting the win in just 41 seconds of round number one.

Burkman faced Steve Carl on October 26, 2013, at WSOF 6 in the main event for the WSOF Welterweight Championship. He lost the fight via triangle choke in the fourth round. It was noted that Josh did tap out from the choke but the ref ignored the tap, allowing Steve Carl to choke Burkman until he lost consciousness.

Burkman faced Tyler Stinson at WSOF 9 on March 29, 2014. He won the fight via knockout in the first round.

=== Return to the Ultimate Fighting Championship ===
Burkman signed a contract to return to the UFC for the first time since 2008 on October 3, 2014. Burkman faced Héctor Lombard on January 3, 2015, at UFC 182. He lost the fight by unanimous decision. Subsequently, it was revealed that Lombard failed his post-fight drug test. On March 23, 2015, it was announced by the NSAC that the result of the fight had been overturned to a no contest.

Burkman faced Dong Hyun Kim on May 23, 2015, at UFC 187. Burkman lost the fight via submission in the third round.

Burkman faced Patrick Côté on August 23, 2015, at UFC Fight Night 74. He lost the back and forth fight via TKO in the third round and both participants were awarded Fight of the Night honors.

For his next fight, Burkman dropped down to the lightweight division as he faced K. J. Noons on February 6, 2016, at UFC Fight Night 82. He won the fight by unanimous decision.

Burkman next faced Paul Felder on May 29, 2016, at UFC Fight Night 88. He lost the fight via unanimous decision.

Burkman was expected to face Bobby Green on October 1, 2016, at UFC Fight Night 96. However, Green pulled out of the fight citing an undisclosed injury. He was replaced by promotional newcomer Zak Ottow. As a result of the late notice opponent change, the bout was contested at welterweight. He lost the fight via split decision.

Burkman faced Michel Prazeres on March 11, 2017, at UFC Fight Night 106. He lost the fight via submission in the first round.

Burkman faced Drew Dober on July 29, 2017, at UFC 214. He lost the fight by knockout in the first round.

Burkman faced Alex Morono on February 18, 2018, at UFC Fight Night 126 at the welterweight division. He lost the fight via a guillotine choke submission in the first round.

=== Post-UFC career ===
After being released from the UFC for the second time, Burkman faced William Macário at LFA 66 on May 10, 2019. He lost the fight via split decision and announced his retirement from MMA.

== Championships & accomplishments ==
- Ultimate Fighting Championship
  - Fight of the Night (One time) vs. Patrick Côté
- Ultimate Fighting Championship
  - UFC Encyclopedia Awards
    - Knockout of the Night (One time) vs. Sammy Morgan
  - UFC.com Awards
    - 2005: Ranked #7 Knockout of the Year vs. Sammy Morgan
- MMA Junkie
  - 2015 August Fight of the Month vs. Patrick Côté
- Sherdog
  - 2013 Submission of the Year vs. Jon Fitch at WSOF 3
- Yahoo Sports
  - 2013 Upset of the Year vs. Jon Fitch at WSOF 3

== Personal life ==
His older brother Jered was a star baseball player alongside Chris Shelton at both Cottonwood High School and Salt Lake Community College.

== Mixed martial arts record ==
Professional record breakdown
47 matches	28 wins	18 losses
By knockout	7	2
By submission	10	9
By decision	11	7
No contests	1	

Res.	Record	Opponent	Method	Event	Date	Round	Time	Location	Notes
Loss	28–18 (1)	William Macário	Decision (split)	LFA 66	May 10, 2019	3	5:00	West Valley City, Utah, United States	
Loss	28–17 (1)	Alex Morono	Submission (guillotine choke)	UFC Fight Night: Cowboy vs. Medeiros	February 18, 2018	1	2:12	Austin, Texas, United States	Welterweight bout.
Loss	28–16 (1)	Drew Dober	KO (punch)	UFC 214	July 29, 2017	1	3:04	Anaheim, California, United States	
Loss	28–15 (1)	Michel Prazeres	Submission (north-south choke)	UFC Fight Night: Belfort vs. Gastelum	March 11, 2017	1	1:42	Fortaleza, Brazil	
Loss	28–14 (1)	Zak Ottow	Decision (split)	UFC Fight Night: Lineker vs. Dodson	October 1, 2016	3	5:00	Portland, Oregon, United States	Welterweight bout.
Loss	28–13 (1)	Paul Felder	Decision (unanimous)	UFC Fight Night: Almeida vs. Garbrandt	May 29, 2016	3	5:00	Las Vegas, Nevada, United States	
Win	28–12 (1)	K. J. Noons	Decision (unanimous)	UFC Fight Night: Hendricks vs. Thompson	February 6, 2016	3	5:00	Las Vegas, Nevada, United States	Lightweight debut.
Loss	27–12 (1)	Patrick Côté	TKO (punches)	UFC Fight Night: Holloway vs. Oliveira	August 23, 2015	3	1:26	Saskatoon, Saskatchewan, Canada	Fight of the Night.
Loss	27–11 (1)	Dong Hyun Kim	Submission (arm-triangle choke)	UFC 187	May 23, 2015	3	2:13	Las Vegas, Nevada, United States	
NC	27–10 (1)	Héctor Lombard	NC (overturned)	UFC 182	January 3, 2015	3	5:00	Las Vegas, Nevada, United States	Originally a unanimous decision win for Lombard; overturned after he tested positive for anabolic steroids.
Win	27–10	Tyler Stinson	KO (punch)	WSOF 9	March 29, 2014	1	2:15	Las Vegas, Nevada, United States	
Loss	26–10	Steve Carl	Technical Submission (triangle choke)	WSOF 6	October 26, 2013	4	1:02	Coral Gables, Florida, United States	For the inaugural WSOF Welterweight Championship.
Win	26–9	Jon Fitch	Technical Submission (guillotine choke)	WSOF 3	June 14, 2013	1	0:41	Las Vegas, Nevada, United States	
Win	25–9	Aaron Simpson	KO (knee and punches)	WSOF 2	March 23, 2013	1	3:04	Atlantic City, New Jersey, United States	
Win	24–9	Gerald Harris	Decision (unanimous)	WSOF 1	November 3, 2012	3	5:00	Las Vegas, Nevada, United States	
Win	23–9	Jamie Yager	Submission (guillotine choke)	Showdown Fights 8 – Burkman vs. Yager	August 25, 2012	2	3:25	Orem, Utah, United States	
Win	22–9	Koffi Adzitso	Decision (unanimous)	Showdown Fights 6 – Breakout	February 24, 2012	3	5:00	Orem, Utah, United States	
Loss	21–9	Jordan Mein	Decision (unanimous)	MMA 1: The Reckoning	April 2, 2011	3	5:00	Rama, Ontario, Canada	
Win	21–8	Jordan Smith	Decision (split)	Showdown Fights 2: Respect	September 24, 2010	3	5:00	Orem, Utah, United States	
Win	20–8	Jake Paul	Decision (unanimous)	Showdown Fights 1: Burkman vs. Paul	April 9, 2010	3	5:00	Orem, Utah, United States	
Win	19–8	Brandon Melendez	KO (punch)	Throwdown Showdown 5	November 20, 2009	1	4:14	Orem, Utah, United States	
Loss	18–8	Pete Sell	Decision (unanimous)	UFC 90	October 25, 2008	3	5:00	Rosemont, Illinois, United States	
Loss	18–7	Dustin Hazelett	Submission (armbar)	The Ultimate Fighter: Team Rampage vs Team Forrest Finale	June 21, 2008	2	4:46	Las Vegas, Nevada, United States	
Loss	18–6	Mike Swick	Decision (majority)	UFC Fight Night: Swick vs. Burkman	January 23, 2008	3	5:00	Las Vegas, Nevada, United States	
Win	18–5	Forrest Petz	Decision (split)	UFC 77	October 20, 2007	3	5:00	Cincinnati, Ohio, United States	
Loss	17–5	Karo Parisyan	Decision (unanimous)	UFC 71	May 26, 2007	3	5:00	Las Vegas, Nevada, United States	
Win	17–4	Chad Reiner	Decision (unanimous)	UFC Fight Night: Evans vs. Salmon	January 25, 2007	3	5:00	Hollywood, Florida, United States	
Win	16–4	Josh Neer	Decision (unanimous)	UFC 61	July 8, 2006	3	5:00	Las Vegas, Nevada, United States	
Loss	15–4	Jon Fitch	Submission (rear-naked choke)	UFC Fight Night 4	April 6, 2006	2	4:57	Las Vegas, Nevada, United States	
Win	15–3	Drew Fickett	Submission (guillotine choke)	UFC Fight Night 3	January 16, 2006	1	1:07	Las Vegas, Nevada, United States	
Win	14–3	Sammy Morgan	KO (slam and elbows)	The Ultimate Fighter 2 Finale	November 5, 2005	1	0:21	Las Vegas, Nevada, United States	
Loss	13–3	Jeremy Horn	Technical Submission (choke)	XFC – Dome Of Destruction 1	April 29, 2005	1	1:14	Tacoma, Washington, United States	Middleweight bout.
Win	13–2	Brian Wieber	TKO (punches)	IFC: Eve Of Destruction	March 5, 2005	1	2:36	Salt Lake City, Utah, United States	Welterweight debut.
Win	12–2	Kyacey Uscola	Submission (rear-naked choke)	SF 4: Fight For Freedom	June 26, 2004	1	N/A	Salt Lake City, Utah, United States	
Win	11–2	Drew Ellisor	Decision (unanimous)	Cage Fighting Championship 1	May 1, 2004	3	5:00	Salt Lake City, Utah, United States	
Win	10–2	Isidro Gonzalez	Submission (guillotine choke)	SF 2: On the Move	March 19, 2004	1	1:58	Portland, Oregon, United States	
Loss	9–2	Matt Horwich	Submission (triangle choke)	SF 1: Revolution	February 21, 2004	2	2:11	Portland, Oregon, United States	
Win	9–1	Jeremy Brown	Decision	UCE Winter Warrior Land: Episode 1	November 29, 2003	N/A	N/A	Salt Lake City, Utah, United States	
Win	8–1	Derek Downey	Decision (unanimous)	UCE Summer Series: Episode 4	August 30, 2003	3	3:00	Salt Lake City, Utah, United States	
Win	7–1	Brian Garlick	Submission (choke)	UCE Round 4: Finals	July 12, 2003	2	N/A	Salt Lake City, Utah, United States	
Win	6–1	Jeremy Brown	Submission (choke)	UCE Round 4: Semi-Finals	July 5, 2003	1	N/A	Salt Lake City, Utah, United States	
Win	5–1	Matthew Bell	KO (punch)	UCE Round 4: Episode 4	June 28, 2003	1	N/A	Salt Lake City, Utah, United States	
Win	4–1	Gedeon Jarvis	Submission (choke)	UCE Round 3: Finals	May 10, 2003	1	N/A	Salt Lake City, Utah, United States	
Win	3–1	Hank Weiss	KO (punch)	UCE Round 3: Semi-Finals	May 3, 2003	1	N/A	Salt Lake City, Utah, United States	
Win	2–1	Matt King	Submission (choke)	UCE Round 3: Episode 2	April 12, 2003	1	N/A	Salt Lake City, Utah, United States	
Win	1–1	Cedric Nicholsen	Submission (choke)	UCE Round 3: Episode 1	April 5, 2003	1	N/A	Salt Lake City, Utah, United States	
Loss	0–1	Hank Weiss	Submission (choke)	UCE Round 2: Episode 1	February 7, 2003	N/A	N/A	Salt Lake City, Utah, United States	

== See also ==
- List of current UFC fighters
- List of male mixed martial artists
