= Francisco Treviño =

Mexican mixed martial arts fighter

- Born: December 17, 1981 (age 44); Reynosa, Tamaulipas, Mexico
- Other names: Sitkayan
- Height: 5 ft 10 in (1.78 m)
- Weight: 155 lb (70 kg; 11.1 st)
- Division: Lightweight
- Fighting out of: McAllen, Texas
- Team: Macaco Gold Team; Team Pound
- Years active: 2008–present

Mixed martial arts record
- Total: 16
- Wins: 13
- By knockout: 4
- By submission: 4
- By decision: 5
- Losses: 3
- By knockout: 1
- By submission: 1
- By decision: 1

Other information
- Mixed martial arts record from Sherdog

Francisco Javier Treviño Ibarguen (born December 17, 1981) is a Mexican professional mixed martial artist. He competes in the Lightweight division, and formerly fought for the UFC.

== Biography and MMA career ==
He was born in Reynosa, Tamaulipas but grew up in Camargo, Tamaulipas and emigrated with his family to McAllen, Texas at the age of four. Treviño played American football in high school, but after graduating he found himself gaining weight and eventually reaching an obese figure of over 250 pounds. He joined Muay Thai classes to lose weight, beginning his 100-pound transformation. After sparring with a mixed martial arts (MMA) fighter and feeling like he could hold his own, he decided to take up Brazilian jiu-jitsu (BJJ) as well.

Only a few months after the sparring session, he made his professional debut in MMA, defeating Shaun Wagner by first-round submission on August 2, 2013, at South Texas FC 3: War Zone. He won ten straight fights in STFC between 2008 and 2013 at middleweight and welterweight. On November 15, 2013, he fought for Legacy Fighting Championship, defeating Lester Batres by unanimous decision (UD) at Legacy FC 25 in Houston. Two days later, he signed a deal with the UFC, dropping even further down to lightweight division. He became the sixth Mexican fighter to ever join the promotion.

== Mixed martial arts record ==
Professional record breakdown
16 matches	13 wins	3 losses
By knockout	4	1
By submission	4	1
By decision	5	1

Res.	Record	Opponent	Method	Event	Date	Round	Time	Location	Notes
Loss	13–3	J. J. Ambrose	Submission (guillotine choke)	Hex Fight Series 6	June 26, 2016	2	4:35	Melbourne, Victoria, Australia	
Win	13–2	J. J. Ambrose	Decision (split)	Hex Fight Series 5	February 20, 2016	3	5:00	Melbourne, Victoria, Australia	
Loss	12–2	Sage Northcutt	TKO (elbows and punches)	UFC 192	October 3, 2015	1	0:57	Houston, Texas, United States	
Loss	12–1	Johnny Case	Decision (unanimous)	UFC 188	June 13, 2015	3	5:00	Mexico City, Mexico	
Win	12–0	Renée Forte	Decision (unanimous)	UFC 171	March 15, 2014	3	5:00	Dallas, Texas, United States	
Win	11–0	Lester Batres	Decision (unanimous)	Legacy Fighting Championship 25	November 15, 2013	3	5:00	Houston, Texas, United States	
Win	10–0	Joseph Daily	Decision (unanimous)	STFC 24: Bad Blood	February 22, 2013	5	5:00	McAllen, Texas, United States	
Win	9–0	Corey Bellino	KO (punch)	STFC 21: Rampage	July 13, 2012	1	4:19	McAllen, Texas, United States	
Win	8–0	Jorge Cortez	Decision (unanimous)	STFC 19: Relentless	March 2, 2012	3	5:00	McAllen, Texas, United States	
Win	7–0	Andrew Garza	TKO (punches)	STFC 16: All or Nothing	August 12, 2011	3	0:48	McAllen, Texas, United States	
Win	6–0	Will Florentino	Submission (armbar)	STFC 12: Tuff Enough	September 3, 2010	1	1:17	McAllen, Texas, United States	
Win	5–0	Larry Hopkins	Submission (kneebar)	STFC 8: Fired Up!	August 15, 2009	1	1:31	McAllen, Texas, United States	
Win	4–0	Kristopher Flores	TKO (punches)	STFC 6: Evolution	April 11, 2009	1	2:57	Odessa, Texas, United States	
Win	3–0	Cole Nuckols	TKO (punches)	STFC 5: Night of Champions	February 20, 2009	2	1:42	Odessa, Texas, United States	
Win	2–0	George Zamarron	Submission (punches)	STFC 4: Fuentes vs. King	November 1, 2008	1	1:49	McAllen, Texas, United States	
Win	1–0	Shaun Wagner	Submission	STFC 3: War Zone	August 2, 2008	1	2:56	McAllen, Texas, United States	

== See also ==
- List of male mixed martial artists
- List of Mexican UFC fighters
