= Paul Felder =

American mixed martial arts fighter (born 1984)

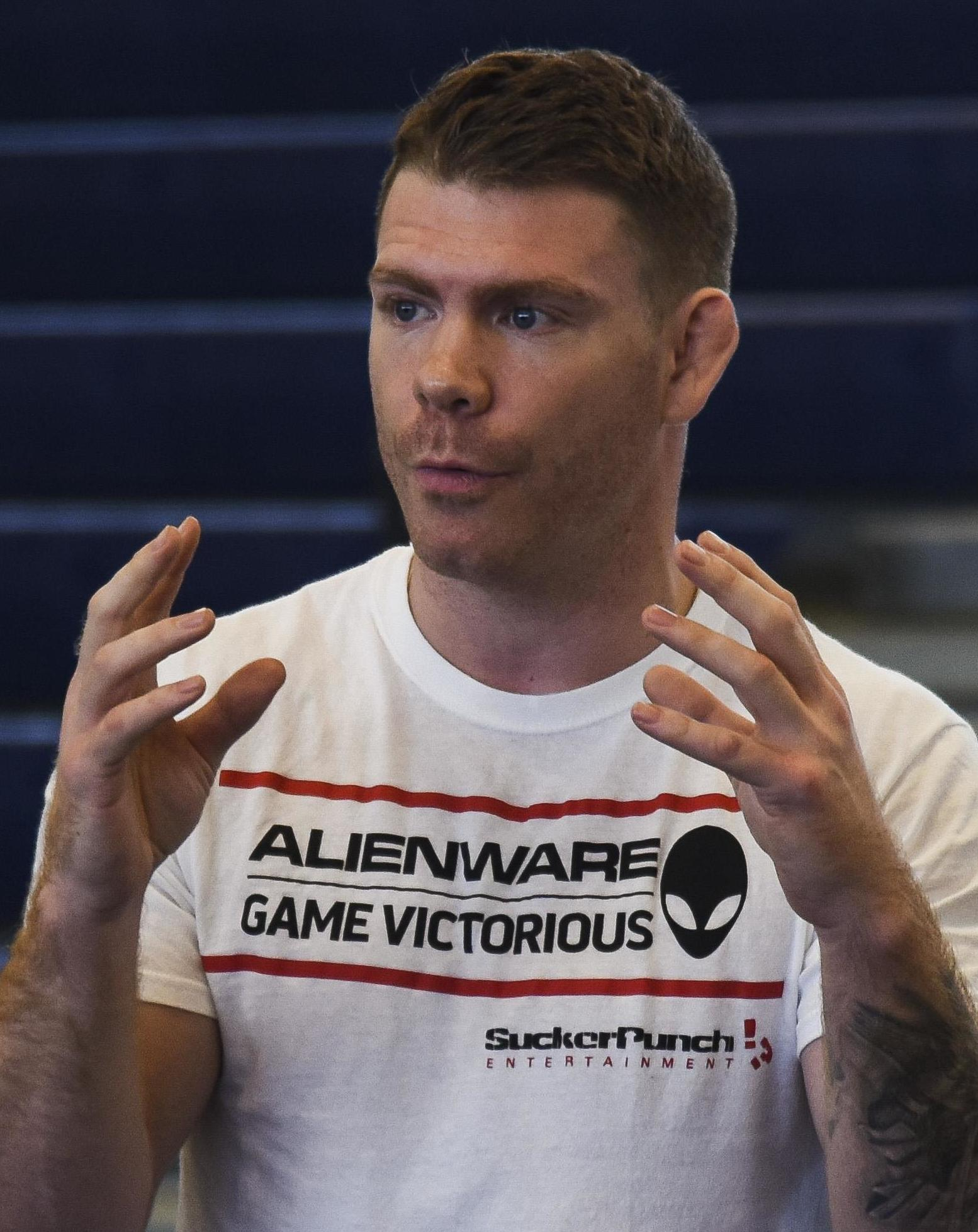
- Felder in 2017
- Born: Paul Robert Felder; April 25, 1984 (age 42); Philadelphia, Pennsylvania, U.S.
- Nickname: The Irish Dragon
- Height: 5 ft 10 in (178 cm)
- Weight: 155 lb (70 kg; 11 st 1 lb)
- Division: Lightweight (2011-2017, 2019-2020); Welterweight (2018)
- Reach: 70 1/2 in (179 cm)
- Style: Muay Thai, Shotokan, Taekwondo
- Fighting out of: Philadelphia, Pennsylvania, U.S.
- Team: Renzo Gracie Academy Philly (2011–present); Nick Catone MMA (2016); Roufusport (2016–present)
- Rank: 2nd degree black belt in Taekwondo; Black belt in Shotokan Karate; Purple belt in Brazilian Jiu-Jitsu under Daniel Gracie
- Years active: 2011–2021

Mixed martial arts record
- Total: 23
- Wins: 17
- By knockout: 10
- By submission: 1
- By decision: 6
- Losses: 6
- By knockout: 1
- By decision: 5

Other information
- Mixed martial arts record from Sherdog

Paul Robert Felder (born April 25, 1984) is an American former professional mixed martial artist and color commentator for the Ultimate Fighting Championship (UFC). As a fighter, Felder competed in the UFC's Lightweight division after making his name in Cage Fury Fighting Championships (CFFC).

== Background ==
He is of Irish and German descent. He began training in martial arts at age 12, starting with Tae Kwon Do and Karate at Zhang Sah. Felder competed in the AAU Junior Olympic Games for Tae Kwon Do. Felder attended Ridley High School in Folsom, Pennsylvania, and later the University of the Arts in Philadelphia, for acting, graduating in 2008.

During college, Felder began training in Muay Thai before later transitioning to mixed martial arts. Due to his karate background, he was given the nickname "The Irish Dragon", a reference to his Irish heritage and fellow karate practitioner Lyoto "The Dragon" Machida. Felder initially pushed back against the nickname, but it caught on and he stuck with it. After fellow UFC lightweight fighter Conor McGregor commented that Felder's surname was of German origin, Felder joked in January 2021 that he would use the nickname "The German Dragon" if he ever fought McGregor.

== Mixed martial arts career ==
=== Early career ===
Felder compiled an amateur MMA record of 3–1 and began his professional mixed martial arts career in 2011. Felder competed entirely in his native Mid-Atlantic states, with most fights for the regional promotion Cage Fury Fighting Championships.

Felder ultimately became Lightweight Champion for the promotion, earning the title with a second-round knockout of Marc Stevens. Felder then defended his title once, with a second-round knockout of Craig Johnson, before signing with the UFC in August 2014.

=== Ultimate Fighting Championship ===
Felder made his promotional debut on October 4, 2014, at UFC Fight Night 54 where he faced Jason Saggo. Felder won the fight by split decision.

Felder was briefly scheduled to face Johnny Case on January 18, 2015, at UFC Fight Night 59. However, Felder was tabbed as a replacement against Danny Castillo on January 3, 2015, at UFC 182, replacing Rustam Khabilov. Felder defeated Castillo via second-round knockout, which earned Felder a Performance of the Night award.

Felder was expected to face Jim Miller on April 18, 2015, at UFC on Fox 15. However, Felder pulled out of the fight citing a knee injury and was replaced by Beneil Dariush.

Felder faced Edson Barboza on July 25, 2015, at UFC on Fox 16, replacing an injured Myles Jury. He lost the fight by unanimous decision. Both participants earned Fight of the Night honors. UFC President Dana White said afterwards that the fight "takes Felder to another level".

Felder faced Ross Pearson on September 5, 2015, at UFC 191. He lost the back-and-forth fight by a controversial split decision.

Felder faced Daron Cruickshank on January 17, 2016, at UFC Fight Night 81. He won the fight via submission in the third round.

Felder next faced Josh Burkman on May 29, 2016, at UFC Fight Night 88. He won the fight via unanimous decision.

Felder faced Francisco Trinaldo on September 24, 2016, at UFC Fight Night 95. During the fight, repeated elbows from Trinaldo opened up a large, bloody cut on Felder's face. With a huge cut and blood streaming down Felder's face, the ringside physician waved the fight off at 2:25 of the third round, resulting in a TKO (doctor's stoppage) loss for Felder.

Felder faced Alessandro Ricci on February 19, 2017, at UFC Fight Night 105. He won the fight via TKO in the first round due to a combination of an elbow and punches. The win also earned Felder his second Performance of the Night bonus award.

Felder faced Stevie Ray on July 16, 2017, at UFC Fight Night 113. He won the fight by knockout in the first round after dropping Ray with a knee strike and subsequently finishing him off with a barrage of ground and pound. The win also earned Felder his third Performance of the Night bonus award.

Felder was expected to face Al Iaquinta on December 2, 2017, at UFC 218. However, Iaquinta pulled out of the fight on October 31 citing an injury and was replaced by Charles Oliveira. Felder won the fight in the second round, finishing Oliveira via TKO with a series of elbows. The bout with Iaquinta was rescheduled for UFC 223. However, on the day of the weigh-ins, Max Holloway was declared unfit to fight Khabib Nurmagomedov, so Iaquinta replaced him.

Felder was scheduled to face James Vick on July 14, 2018, at UFC Fight Night 133. However, on June 27, Vick was pulled from that fight in favor of a matchup against Justin Gaethje the following month at UFC Fight Night 135. On June 28, it was announced that Felder would replace Yancy Medeiros in a Welterweight bout against Mike Perry at UFC 226 on July 7. He lost the fight via split decision.

Felder faced James Vick on February 17, 2019, at UFC on ESPN 1. He won the fight by unanimous decision.

Felder faced Edson Barboza in a rematch on September 7, 2019, at UFC 242. Felder won by controversial split decision. 13 out of 16 MMA media outlets scored the bout in favor of Barboza.

As the first bout of his new, multi-fight deal Felder faced Dan Hooker on February 23, 2020, at UFC Fight Night: Felder vs. Hooker. He lost the fight via a controversial split decision. 12 out of 17 media journalists scored the fight for Felder. This fight earned him a Fight of the Night award. After the fight Felder mentioned in his post-fight speech it may have been his last fight. However he confirmed in an interview with Ariel Helwani that he was not retiring, but only wants to take on fights which entice him.

In a quick turnaround, it was announced that Felder stepped in on five days notice to replace Islam Makhachev and face former UFC Lightweight Champion Rafael dos Anjos on November 14, 2020, while headlining UFC Fight Night: Felder vs. dos Anjos. Felder was originally scheduled to work the event as a color-commentator. Despite a dominant performance from dos Anjos, Felder lost the bout by split decision. This fight earned him the Fight of the Night award. Subsequently, Felder signed a new, multi-fight contract with the UFC.

On May 22, 2021, while working as a commentator for the broadcast of UFC Fight Night: Font vs. Garbrandt, Felder announced his retirement from mixed martial arts competition. However, on September 21, 2023, Felder was back on the UFC Roster.

== Personal life ==
Felder has two daughters, Aisling (born 2015) and Ruby (born 2022).

Felder made his UFC color commentary debut on September 16, 2017, at UFC Fight Night 116 in Pittsburgh, Pennsylvania. He then made his UFC pay-per-view commentary debut on November 3, 2018, at UFC 230 at Madison Square Garden in New York City, New York.

== Championships and accomplishments ==
- Cage Fury Fighting Championships
  - CFFC Lightweight Championship (One time)
    - One successful title defense vs. Craig Johnson
- Ultimate Fighting Championship
  - Performance of the Night (Three times) vs. Danny Castillo, Alessandro Ricci, and Stevie Ray
  - Fight of the Night (Three times) vs. Edson Barboza, Dan Hooker and Rafael dos Anjos
  - UFC.com Awards
    - 2015: Ranked #8 Fight of the Year vs. Edson Barboza, Half-Year Awards: Best Knockout of the 1HY & Ranked #4 Knockout of the Year vs. Danny Castillo
    - 2020: Ranked #5 Fight of the Year vs. Dan Hooker
- MMAJunkie.com
  - 2015 January Knockout of the Month vs. Danny Castillo
  - 2019 September Fight of the Month vs. Edson Barboza
  - 2020 February Fight of the Month vs. Dan Hooker
- CombatPress.com
  - 2018 Broadcast Analyst of the Year
  - 2021 Broadcast Analyst of the Year

== Mixed martial arts record ==
Professional record breakdown
23 matches	17 wins	6 losses
By knockout	10	1
By submission	1	0
By decision	6	5

Res.	Record	Opponent	Method	Event	Date	Round	Time	Location	Notes
Loss	17–6	Rafael dos Anjos	Decision (split)	UFC Fight Night: Felder vs. dos Anjos	November 14, 2020	5	5:00	Las Vegas, Nevada, United States	Fight of the Night.
Loss	17–5	Dan Hooker	Decision (split)	UFC Fight Night: Felder vs. Hooker	February 23, 2020	5	5:00	Auckland, New Zealand	Fight of the Night.
Win	17–4	Edson Barboza	Decision (split)	UFC 242	September 7, 2019	3	5:00	Abu Dhabi, United Arab Emirates	
Win	16–4	James Vick	Decision (unanimous)	UFC on ESPN: Ngannou vs. Velasquez	February 17, 2019	3	5:00	Phoenix, Arizona, United States	Return to Lightweight.
Loss	15–4	Mike Perry	Decision (split)	UFC 226	July 7, 2018	3	5:00	Las Vegas, Nevada, United States	Welterweight debut.
Win	15–3	Charles Oliveira	TKO (elbows)	UFC 218	December 2, 2017	2	4:06	Detroit, Michigan, United States	
Win	14–3	Stevie Ray	KO (elbows)	UFC Fight Night: Nelson vs. Ponzinibbio	July 16, 2017	1	3:57	Glasgow, Scotland	Performance of the Night.
Win	13–3	Alessandro Ricci	TKO (elbow and punches)	UFC Fight Night: Lewis vs. Browne	February 19, 2017	1	4:44	Halifax, Nova Scotia, Canada	Performance of the Night.
Loss	12–3	Francisco Trinaldo	TKO (doctor stoppage)	UFC Fight Night: Cyborg vs. Länsberg	September 24, 2016	3	2:25	Brasília, Brazil	
Win	12–2	Josh Burkman	Decision (unanimous)	UFC Fight Night: Almeida vs. Garbrandt	May 29, 2016	3	5:00	Las Vegas, Nevada, United States	
Win	11–2	Daron Cruickshank	Submission (rear-naked choke)	UFC Fight Night: Dillashaw vs. Cruz	January 17, 2016	3	3:56	Boston, Massachusetts, United States	
Loss	10–2	Ross Pearson	Decision (split)	UFC 191	September 5, 2015	3	5:00	Las Vegas, Nevada, United States	
Loss	10–1	Edson Barboza	Decision (unanimous)	UFC on Fox: Dillashaw vs. Barão 2	July 25, 2015	3	5:00	Chicago, Illinois, United States	Fight of the Night.
Win	10–0	Danny Castillo	KO (spinning back fist)	UFC 182	January 3, 2015	2	2:09	Las Vegas, Nevada, United States	Performance of the Night.
Win	9–0	Jason Saggo	Decision (split)	UFC Fight Night: MacDonald vs. Saffiedine	October 4, 2014	3	5:00	Halifax, Nova Scotia, Canada	
Win	8–0	Craig Johnson	KO (spinning heel kick)	CFFC 38: Felder vs. Johnson	August 9, 2014	2	3:44	Atlantic City, New Jersey, United States	Defended the CFFC Lightweight Championship.
Win	7–0	Marc Stevens	TKO (punches)	CFFC 33: Felder vs. Stevens	March 22, 2014	2	4:03	Philadelphia, Pennsylvania, United States	Won the CFFC Lightweight Championship.
Win	6–0	Julian Lane	Decision (unanimous)	CFFC 28: Brenneman vs. Baker	October 26, 2013	3	5:00	Atlantic City, New Jersey, United States	
Win	5–0	Corey Bleaken	Decision (unanimous)	CFFC 24: Sullivan vs. Becker	May 11, 2013	3	5:00	Atlantic City, New Jersey, United States	
Win	4–0	Ricky Nuno	TKO (elbows)	CFFC 20: Heckman vs. Martinez	February 8, 2013	1	2:15	King of Prussia, Pennsylvania, United States	
Win	3–0	Khama Worthy	TKO (punches)	Pinnacle FC: Pittsburgh Challenge Series 1	December 29, 2012	1	1:10	Pittsburgh, Pennsylvania, United States	
Win	2–0	Judah Ciervo	TKO (doctor stoppage)	XFE: Cage Wars 14	March 3, 2012	2	5:00	Chester, Pennsylvania, United States	
Win	1–0	Mtume Goodrum	TKO (knees)	CFFC 12: Pollard vs. Soto	December 10, 2011	2	2:31	Atlantic City, New Jersey, United States	Lightweight debut.

== See also ==
- List of male mixed martial artists
