= UFC 182 =

UFC mixed martial arts event in 2015

UFC 182: Jones vs. Cormier
- The poster for UFC 182: Jones vs. Cormier
- Promotion: Ultimate Fighting Championship
- Date: January 3, 2015
- Venue: MGM Grand Garden Arena
- City: Las Vegas, Nevada
- Attendance: 11,575
- Total gate: $3,700,000

Event chronology
UFC Fight Night: Machida vs. Dollaway	UFC 182: Jones vs. Cormier	UFC Fight Night: McGregor vs. Siver

UFC 182: Jones vs. Cormier was a mixed martial arts event held on January 3, 2015, at the MGM Grand Garden Arena in Las Vegas, Nevada.

== Background ==
The event was headlined by a Light Heavyweight Championship bout between the champion at that time, Jon Jones, and top contender Daniel Cormier.

Jones was initially scheduled to face Alexander Gustafsson in a rematch on September 27, 2014 at UFC 178. However, Gustafsson pulled out of the bout due to a knee injury and was replaced by Daniel Cormier. Subsequently, on August 12, Jones pulled out of the bout against Cormier citing a leg injury, which in turn led to the rescheduling of the pairing to this event.

A matchup for the Women's Bantamweight Championship between the champion at the time Ronda Rousey and top contender Cat Zingano was briefly attached to this event. However, it was announced in late October that the pairing was delayed and would take place eight weeks later at UFC 184.

Danny Castillo was expected to face Rustam Khabilov, but visa issues forced Khabilov out of the fight. He was replaced by Paul Felder, who was originally scheduled to fight at UFC Fight Night: McGregor vs. Siver.

Alexis Dufresne missed weight on her first attempt at the weigh ins, weighing in at 138 pounds. She was given additional time to make the bantamweight limit, but made no attempt to cut further. Instead, she was fined 20 percent of her purse, which went to Marion Reneau.

UFC 182 is the third longest UFC event behind UFC 136 and UFC Fight Night: Werdum vs. Tybura with a total in-cage fight time of 154 minutes and 56 seconds.

On January 6, it was announced that Jones failed a drug test prior to the event. He tested positive for benzoylecgonine, the primary metabolite of cocaine. As benzoylecgonine is not banned out of competition by the World Anti-Doping Agency, the NSAC could not halt Jones from fighting at UFC 182. He was randomly tested on December 4 and the results came back on December 23, the NSAC Executive Director Bob Bennett said. Jones immediately entered rehab, though it was later revealed by his mother that he only spent one night in rehab.

On February 10, it was announced that Héctor Lombard failed a fight night drug test, testing positive for the anabolic steroid desoxymethyltestosterone. The failed drug test was responsible for the cancellation of his bout against Rory MacDonald at UFC 186. On March 23, Lombard was suspended for one year, fined and had his win over Josh Burkman overturned to a no contest by the NSAC. He was fined his original $53,000 win bonus, plus one-third of the rest of his purse, which included $53,000 in show money. In addition, Lombard also must pass a drug test prior to getting relicensed by the NSAC.

== Results ==
Main Card
Weight class				Method	Round	Time	Notes
Light Heavyweight	Jon Jones (c)	def.	Daniel Cormier	Decision (unanimous) (49–46, 49–46, 49–46)	5	5:00	(Note: For the UFC Light Heavyweight Championship.)
Lightweight	Donald Cerrone	def.	Myles Jury	Decision (unanimous) (30–27, 30–27, 30–27)	3	5:00
Middleweight	Brad Tavares	def.	Nate Marquardt	Decision (unanimous) (30–27, 30–27, 30–27)	3	5:00
Flyweight	Kyoji Horiguchi	def.	Louis Gaudinot	Decision (unanimous) (29–28, 30–27, 30–27)	3	5:00
Welterweight	Héctor Lombard	vs.	Josh Burkman	No Contest (overturned)	3	5:00	(Note: Originally a unanimous decision (30–27, 30–27, 29–28) victory for Lombard, the result was changed to "No Contest" after Lombard tested positive for desoxymethyltestosterone during a post-fight screening.)
Preliminary Card (Fox Sports 1)
Lightweight	Paul Felder	def.	Danny Castillo	KO (spinning back fist)	2	2:09
Bantamweight	Cody Garbrandt	def.	Marcus Brimage	TKO (punches)	3	4:50
Heavyweight	Shawn Jordan	def.	Jared Cannonier	KO (punches)	1	2:57
Lightweight	Evan Dunham	def.	Rodrigo Damm	Decision (unanimous) (30–27, 30–27, 30–27)	3	5:00
Preliminary Card (UFC Fight Pass)
Welterweight	Omari Akhmedov	def.	Mats Nilsson	Decision (unanimous) (29–28, 29–28, 29–28)	3	5:00
Catchweight (138 lb)	Marion Reneau	def.	Alexis Dufresne	Decision (unanimous) (30–26, 30–26, 30–25)	3	5:00

== Bonus awards ==
The following fighters were awarded $50,000 bonuses:

- Fight of the Night: Jon Jones vs. Daniel Cormier
- Performance of the Night: Paul Felder and Shawn Jordan

== Reported payout ==
The following is the reported payout to the fighters as reported to the Nevada State Athletic Commission. It does not include sponsor money and also does not include the UFC's traditional "fight night" bonuses.

- Jon Jones: $500,000 (no win bonus) def. Daniel Cormier: $90,000
- Donald Cerrone: $140,000 (includes $70,000 win bonus) def. Myles Jury: $16,000
- Brad Tavares: $50,000 (includes $25,000 win bonus) def. Nate Marquardt: $49,000
- Kyoji Horiguchi: $40,000 (includes $20,000 win bonus) def. Louis Gaudinot: $10,000
- Hector Lombard: $106,000 (includes $53,000 win bonus) def. Josh Burkman: $45,000
- Paul Felder: $20,000 (includes $10,000 win bonus) def. Danny Castillo: $36,000
- Cody Garbrandt: $16,000 (includes $8,000 win bonus) def. Marcus Brimage: $12,000
- Shawn Jordan: $44,000 (includes $22,000 win bonus) def. Jared Cannonier: $8,000
- Evan Dunham: $54,000 (includes $27,000 win bonus) def. Rodrigo Damm: $12,000
- Omari Akhmedov: $20,000 (includes $10,000 win bonus) def. Mats Nilsson: $8,000
- Marion Reneau: $17,600 (includes $8,000 win bonus) def. Alexis Dufresne: $6,400 ^

^ Alexis Dufresne was fined 20 percent of her purse for failing to make the required weight for her fight with Marion Reneau. That money was issued to Reneau, an NSAC official confirmed.

== See also ==
- List of UFC events
- 2015 in UFC
