= World Series of Fighting 5: Arlovski vs. Kyle =

World Series of Fighting mixed martial arts event in 2013

- Promotion: World Series of Fighting
- Date: September 14, 2013
- Venue: Revel Casino
- City: (United States) Atlantic City, New Jersey, US
- Attendance: 4,000

Event chronology
World Series of Fighting 4: Spong vs. DeAnda	World Series of Fighting 5: Arlovski vs. Kyle	World Series of Fighting 6: Burkman vs. Carl

World Series of Fighting 5: Arlovski vs. Kyle was a mixed martial arts event held September 14, 2013 in Atlantic City, New Jersey, United States.

== Background ==
On May 15, 2013, WSOF announced a 4 man tournament to crown an Inaugural Middleweight Champion to take place at WSOF 5. The participants announced were: Jesse Taylor, Elvis Mutapčić, David Branch and Danillo Villefort

Anthony Johnson was expected to face Mike Kyle in the main event however Johnson was forced to withdraw from the bout due to injury and was replaced by Andrei Arlovski.

The planned Middleweight Championship Tournament Semifinal bout between Elvis Mutapčić and Jesse Taylor was cancelled the night of the event when a member of the New Jersey Athletic Commission claimed they saw Mutapčić take an unknown and undisclosed medicine before the contest in the locker room.

== Results ==
Main card (NBC Sports)
Weight class				Method	Round	Time	Notes
Heavyweight	Andrei Arlovski	def.	Mike Kyle	Decision (unanimous) (29–28, 29–28, 29–28)	3	5:00
Middleweight	Dave Branch	def.	Danillo Villefort	Decision (unanimous) (30–27, 30–27, 30–27)	3	5:00	(Note: WSOF Middleweight Tournament Semifinal.)
Heavyweight	Derrick Mehmen	def.	Rolles Gracie Jr.	KO (punch)	2	2:40
Featherweight	Georgi Karakhanyan	def.	Waylon Lowe	Submission (guillotine choke)	1	3:37
Preliminary card (Sherdog.com)
Featherweight	Rick Glenn	def.	Artur Rofi	Decision (unanimous) (29–28, 29–28, 29–28)	3	5:00
Bantamweight	Jimmie Rivera	def.	Sidemar Honorio	Decision (unanimous) (30–27, 29–28, 29–28)	3	5:00
Welterweight	Richard Patishnock	def.	Gregor Gracie	Decision (unanimous) (30–27, 29–28, 29–28)	3	5:00
Catchweight (160 lb)	Ozzy Dugulubgov	def.	Andrew Osbourne	Submission (Achilles lock)	2	1:12
Middleweight	Neiman Gracie	def.	Darren Costa	Submission (armbar)	1	3:57

=== Tournament bracket ===
Semifinals
Dave Branch	DEC
Danillo Villefort	15:00
Elvis Mutapčić
Jesse Taylor

Finals
Dave Branch

== See also ==
- World Series of Fighting
- List of WSOF champions
- List of WSOF events
