= Villefort =

Villefort may refer to:

== Places in France ==
- Villefort, Aude, a commune in the Aude department
- Villefort, Lozère, a commune in the Lozère department
- Lac de Villefort, a lake in Lozère

== People ==
- Danillo Villefort (born 1983), Brazilian mixed martial artist
- Yuri Villefort (born 1991), Brazilian mixed martial artist

== Fictional characters ==
- the de Villefort family in Alexandre Dumas' novel The Count of Monte Cristo
  - Gérard de Villefort, the deputy crown prosecutor and one of the main villains
  - Noirtier de Villefort, Gérard's father
  - Héloïse de Villefort, Gérard's second wife
  - Valentine de Villefort, Gérard's daughter
