= World Series of Fighting 7: Karakhanyan vs. Palmer =

World Series of Fighting mixed martial arts event in 2013

- Promotion: World Series of Fighting
- Date: December 7, 2013
- Venue: PNE Agrodome
- City: Vancouver, British Columbia, Canada
- Attendance: 4,521

Event chronology
World Series of Fighting 6: Burkman vs. Carl	World Series of Fighting 7: Karakhanyan vs. Palmer	WSOF: Central America - La Revancha

World Series of Fighting 7: Karakhanyan vs. Palmer was a mixed martial arts event held December 7, 2013 in Vancouver, British Columbia, Canada.

== Background ==
Mike Kyle vs. Anthony Johnson was originally scheduled for this event but was later cancelled because Kyle was forced off the fight because of a broken toe.

The main event was to crown the inaugural Worlds Series of Fighting featherweight champion.

This event featured Elvis Mutapčić and Jesse Taylor in their delayed middleweight title tournament semifinal.

== Results ==
Main card (NBC Sports)
Weight class				Method	Round	Time	Notes
Featherweight	Georgi Karakhanyan	def.	Lance Palmer	Submission (guillotine choke)	3	4:40	(Note: For the inaugural WSOF Featherweight Championship.)
Middleweight	Jesse Taylor	def.	Elvis Mutapčić	Decision (unanimous) (30–27, 30–27, 30–27)	3	5:00	(Note: WSOF Middleweight Tournament Semifinal.)
Lightweight	Nick Newell	def.	Sabah Fadai	Submission (guillotine choke)	1	1:21
Light heavyweight	Kalib Starnes	def.	Dwayne Lewis	KO (elbow)	2	1:08
Preliminary card (topmmanews.com)
Welterweight	Michael Hill	def.	Richard Arsenault	TKO (doctor stoppage)	2	1:29
Middleweight	David Perron	def.	Matt Baker	Submission (triangle choke)	1	1:46
Lightweight	Gabriel Solorio	def.	Shawn Albrecht	Decision (unanimous) (29–28, 29–28, 29–28)	3	5:00
Lightweight	Myles Merola	def.	Dan Ring	Decision (unanimous) (29–27, 29–27, 29–27)	3	5:00
Middleweight	Brendan Kornberger	def.	Micah Brakefield	TKO (corner stoppage)	2	2:45

=== Tournament bracket ===
Semifinals
Dave Branch	DEC
Danillo Villefort	15:00
Elvis Mutapčić	15:00
Jesse Taylor	DEC

Finals
Dave Branch
Jesse Taylor

== See also ==
- World Series of Fighting
- List of WSOF champions
- List of WSOF events
