= World Series of Fighting 12: Palomino vs Gonzalez =

World Series of Fighting MMA event in 2014

World Series of Fighting 12: Palomino vs. Gonzalez
- Promotion: World Series of Fighting
- Date: August 9, 2014
- Venue: Hard Rock Hotel and Casino
- City: Paradise, Nevada, United States
- Attendance: 550

Event chronology
World Series of Fighting 11: Gaethje vs. Newell	World Series of Fighting 12: Palomino vs. Gonzalez	World Series of Fighting 13: Moraes vs. Bollinger

World Series of Fighting 12: Palomino vs. Gonzalez was a mixed martial arts event held on August 9, 2014, in Paradise, Nevada, United States. The event also aired on NBCSN.

== Background ==
The event was originally scheduled to take place on August 2, 2014, in Tokyo, Japan.

Krasimir Mladenov was expected to face Elvis Mutapčić at the event, However Mladenov pulled out of the bout due to an injury and was replaced by Kelvin Tiller. Tiller was originally scheduled to face Ronny Markes at the event, Markes instead faced promotional newcomer Cully Butterfield.

== Results ==
Main Card
Weight class				Method	Round	Time	Notes
Lightweight	Luis Palomino	def.	Lewis Gonzalez	KO (knee and punch)	1	4:42
Light Heavyweight	Ronny Markes	def.	Cully Butterfield	Decision (unanimous) (29–28, 29–28, 29–28)	3	5:00
Catchweight (195 lb)	Elvis Mutapčić	def.	Kelvin Tiller	Decision (unanimous) (30–27, 29–28, 29–28)	3	5:00
Bantamweight	Brandon Hempleman	def.	Alexis Vila	Decision (unanimous) (29–28, 30–27, 30–27)	3	5:00
Bantamweight	Matt Sayles	def.	Brenson Hansen	Decision (unanimous) (29–28, 29–28, 29–28)	3	5:00
Preliminary card
Lightweight	Lucas Montoya	def.	Jimmy Spicuzza	TKO (punches)	1	4:11
Welterweight	Danny Davis Jr.	def.	Jorge Lopez	Decision (unanimous) (29–28, 29–28, 29–28)	3	5:00
Bantamweight	Adam Acquaviva	def.	Cody Maltais	Decision (split) (29–28, 28–29, 29–28)	3	5:00
Lightweight	Bryson Gutches	def.	Soslan Abanokov	Submission (rear-naked choke)	2	1:07

== See also ==
- World Series of Fighting
- List of WSOF champions
- List of WSOF events
