= World Series of Fighting 2: Central America =

World Series of Fighting mixed martial arts event in 2013

World Series of Fighting: Central America 2
- Promotion: World Series of Fighting: Central America
- Date: December 14, 2013
- Venue: Pharaoh's Casino
- City: Managua, Managua, Nicaragua
- Attendance: 73

Event chronology
WSOF 7: Karakhanyan vs. Palmer	World Series of Fighting: Central America 2	WSOF 8: Gaethje vs. Patishnock

World Series of Fighting: Central America 2 - La Revancha was a mixed martial arts event held on December 14, 2013 in Managua, Managua, Nicaragua.

== Background ==
This was the second event the World Series of Fighting event held in Managua, Managua, Nicaragua. The event was headlined by former WBA/WBC Welterweight champion and the former WBC light middleweight champion Ricardo Mayorga taking on Sergio Ortiz.

== Results ==
Main card
Weight class				Method	Round	Time	Notes
Welterweight	Sergio Ortiz	def.	Ricardo Mayorga	Submission (armbar)	2	4:23
Middleweight	Sydney Machado	def.	Brian Green	Decision (unanimous)	3	5:00
Catchweight	Wesley Tiffer	def.	Cesar Velasquez Moreno	Submission (front choke)	2	2:01
Lightweight	Jonathan Nunez	def.	Joel Dona Orsoto	TKO (punches)	1	2:13
Featherweight	Leonardo Morales	def.	Jorge Garcia Urbina	TKO (doctor stoppage)	2	1:51
Featherweight	Esdo Moises de Paz	def.	Christian Zamora Lopez	Submission (rear-naked choke)	1	1:37
Welterweight	Cristian Soto	def.	Alejandro Rodriguez	KO (punch)	1	4:58

== See also ==
- World Series of Fighting
- List of WSOF champions
- List of WSOF events
