= World Series of Fighting 8: Gaethje vs. Patishnock =

American MMA event in 2013

- Promotion: World Series of Fighting
- Date: January 18, 2014
- Venue: Seminole Hard Rock Hotel & Casino
- City: Hollywood, Florida, United States
- Attendance: 913

Event chronology
World Series of Fighting 2: Central America	World Series of Fighting 8: Gaethje vs. Patishnock	World Series of Fighting Canada 1: Ford vs. Powell

World Series of Fighting 8: Gaethje vs. Patishnock was a mixed martial arts event held January 18, 2014 in Hollywood, Florida, United States.

== Background ==
This event was supposed to feature the first WSOF Lightweight Championship bout between Justin Gaethje and Gesias Cavalcante. However, Cavalcante had to pull out of the fight due to injury and was replaced by Lewis Gonzalez. It was then announced that Gonzalez was also forced to pull out of the bout due to injury and he was replaced by Richard Patishnock.

The other title fight on the card featured the first WSOF Women's Strawweight Championship bout between Jessica Aguilar and Alida Gray.

== Results ==
Main Card (NBC Sports)
Weight class				Method	Round	Time	Notes
Lightweight	Justin Gaethje	def.	Richard Patishnock	TKO (punches and elbows)	1	1:09	(Note: For the inaugural WSOF Lightweight Championship.)
Light Heavyweight	Anthony Johnson	def.	Mike Kyle	KO (punch)	1	2:03
Women's Strawweight	Jessica Aguilar	def.	Alida Gray	Submission (arm-triangle choke)	1	2:45	(Note: For the inaugural WSOF Women's Strawweight Championship.)
Bantamweight	Cody Bollinger	def.	Tyson Nam	Decision (unanimous) (29–28, 29–28, 29–28)	3	5:00
Lightweight	Luis Palomino	def.	Jorge Patino	KO (punches)	2	4:20
Preliminary card (online)
Welterweight	Tyler Stinson	def.	Valdir Araujo	TKO (punches)	3	2:23
Heavyweight	Derrick Mehmen	def.	Scott Barrett	Decision (unanimous) (30–27, 29–28, 29–28)	3	5:00
Flyweight	Alexis Vila	def.	Sidemar Honorio	Decision (unanimous) (30–27, 29–28, 29–28)	3	5:00
Featherweight	Freddy Assuncao	def.	Brenson Hansen	Decision (split) (29–28, 28–29, 29–28)	3	5:00
Welterweight	Anderson Melo	def.	Jose Caceres	Submission (heel hook)	1	1:10

== See also ==
- World Series of Fighting
- List of WSOF champions
- List of WSOF events
