= Alexis Vila =

Cuban wrestler, mixed martial artist and murderer

Alexis Vila Perdomo
- Born: March 12, 1971 (age 55); Villa Clara, Cuba
- Other names: The Exorcist
- Height: 5 ft 4 in (1.63 m)
- Weight: 125 lb (57 kg; 8 st 13 lb)
- Division: Flyweight (2007–2011, 2013-present), Bantamweight (2011–2012)
- Reach: 69 1/2 in (177 cm)
- Fighting out of: Miami, Florida, United States
- Team: American Top Team
- Wrestling: Freestyle Wrestling
- Years active: 2007–2016

Mixed martial arts record
- Total: 22
- Wins: 15
- By knockout: 7
- By submission: 3
- By decision: 5
- Losses: 7
- By knockout: 1
- By submission: 1
- By decision: 5

Other information
- Mixed martial arts record from Sherdog

Medal record

Men's freestyle wrestling

Representing Cuba

Olympic Games
Bronze medal – third place	1996 Atlanta	48 kg

World Championships
Gold medal – first place	1993 Toronto	48 kg
Gold medal – first place	1994 Istanbul	48 kg
Silver medal – second place	1995 Atlanta	48 kg

Pan American Games
Gold medal – first place	1995 Mar del Plata	48 kg

Alexis Vila Perdomo (born March 12, 1971) is a Cuban professional mixed martial artist. An accomplished wrestler, Vila is also a two-time World Champion and 1996 Olympic bronze medallist. At the 1996 Summer Olympics he won the bronze medal in the Freestyle Light Flyweight (– 48 kg) category.

In 2019, Vila was sentenced to 15 years in prison for his part in a kidnapping and murder.

== Background ==
Born and raised in a rough neighborhood in Villa Clara, Cuba, Vila began getting into street fights from a young age. After winning multiple titles in wrestling and earning a bronze medal at the 1996 Summer Olympics in Atlanta, Georgia, Vila defected to the United States in 1997 and found a job coaching at Michigan State University where he worked with future UFC fighters Rashad Evans and Gray Maynard. In 2004, Vila accidentally crashed his car into Fort Lauderdale-Hollywood International Airport. Though no one was hurt, authorities mistakenly believed it to be attempted terrorism and Vila was charged with airport violence and sent to prison for three years. Upon his release, Vila began his career in mixed martial arts.

== Mixed martial arts career ==
=== Bellator Fighting Championships ===
Vila made his Bellator debut by defeating Featherweight Champion Joe Warren in the quarterfinals of the Bantamweight tournament at Bellator 51. Vila next faced Marcos Galvao and won by controversial split decision.

In the finals, Vila faced Eduardo Dantas for the Season 5 Bellator Bantamweight Tournament Championship. He lost the fight via unanimous decision.

Vila's next fight was against Luis Nogueira in the Quarterfinals of the Season 6 Bantamweight Tournament. Vila lost via unanimous decision.

=== World Series of Fighting ===
Vila faced Josh Rettinghouse in a Bantamweight bout at World Series of Fighting 6: Burkman vs. Carl on October 26, 2013. He lost the fight via unanimous decision.

Vila faced Sidemar Honorio at WSOF 8. He won the bout via unanimous decision.

Vila then faced Brandon Hempleman at WSOF 12 on August 9, 2014. Vila lost via unanimous decision.

=== Other promotions ===
Vila faced Brazilian prospect Marcel Adur at Fight Time 23: Mayhem In Miami on February 6, 2015. He lost the fight via body kick TKO, suffering the first TKO loss of his career.

== Personal life ==
He has a daughter in Cuba. He married Adriana Vila Perdomo (née De La Cruz) in Miami on April 26, 2012, but later divorced. She is now married to fellow Cuban boxer Joel Casamayor. On April 23, 2018, Vila was arrested for charges including 2nd degree murder.

In December 2019, he was sentenced to 15 years in prison following his conviction for his role in organizing the kidnapping, torture and murder of Camilo Salazar.

== Mixed martial arts record ==
Professional record breakdown
22 matches	15 wins	7 losses
By knockout	7	1
By submission	3	1
By decision	5	5

Res.	Record	Opponent	Method	Event	Date	Round	Time	Location	Notes
Win	15–7	Jorge Calvo	Decision (unanimous)	Titan FC 40	August 5, 2016	3	5:00	Coral Gables, Florida, United States	
Loss	14–7	Abdiel Velazquez	Decision (majority)	Titan FC 39	June 10, 2016	3	5:00	Coral Gables, Florida, United States	
Loss	14–6	Marcel Adur	TKO (body kick and punches)	Fight Time 23 – Mayhem In Miami	February 6, 2015	1	4:49	Miami, Florida, United States	
Loss	14–5	Brandon Hempleman	Decision (unanimous)	WSOF 12	August 9, 2014	3	5:00	Las Vegas, Nevada, United States	
Win	14–4	Sidemar Honorio	Decision (unanimous)	WSOF 8	January 18, 2014	3	5:00	Hollywood, Florida, United States	Flyweight bout
Loss	13–4	Josh Rettinghouse	Decision (unanimous)	WSOF 6	October 26, 2013	3	5:00	Coral Gables, Florida, United States	Bantamweight bout
Win	13–3	Wascar Cruz	Submission (guillotine choke)	CFA – Fight Night 1	September 11, 2013	1	2:12	Miami, Florida, United States	
Win	12–3	Czar Sklavos	Decision (unanimous)	CFA 11: Kyle vs. Wiuff 2	May 24, 2013	3	5:00	Coral Gables, Florida, United States	
Loss	11–3	Joshua Sampo	Submission (guillotine choke)	CFA 9: Night of Champions	January 19, 2013	5	2:26	Coral Gables, Florida, United States	For the inaugural CFA Flyweight Championship
Loss	11–2	Luis Nogueira	Decision (unanimous)	Bellator 65	April 13, 2012	3	5:00	Atlantic City, New Jersey, United States	Bellator Season 6 Bantamweight Tournament Quarterfinal
Loss	11–1	Eduardo Dantas	Decision (unanimous)	Bellator 59	November 26, 2011	3	5:00	Atlantic City, New Jersey, United States	Bellator Season 5 Bantamweight Tournament Final
Win	11–0	Marcos Galvão	Decision (split)	Bellator 55	October 22, 2011	3	5:00	Yuma, Arizona, United States	Bellator Season 5 Bantamweight Tournament Semifinal
Win	10–0	Joe Warren	KO (punch)	Bellator 51	September 24, 2011	1	1:04	Canton, Ohio, United States	Bellator Season 5 Bantamweight Tournament Quarterfinal; Bantamweight Debut.
Win	9–0	Lewis McKenzie	TKO (punches)	MFA: New Generation 4	February 12, 2011	2	3:26	Miami, Florida, United States	
Win	8–0	Omar Choudhury	TKO (punches)	MFA: New Generation 2	June 25, 2010	2	2:50	Miami, Florida, United States	
Win	7–0	Sean Hall	TKO (punches)	MFA: New Generation 1	April 30, 2010	2	3:34	Miami, Florida, United States	
Win	6–0	Cody Bell	TKO (punches)	G-Force Fights: Bad Blood 2	October 26, 2009	2	0:54	Coral Gables, Florida, United States	
Win	5–0	Ben Nguyen	KO (punch)	PFC: Best of Both Worlds	February 6, 2009	2	0:34	Lemoore, California, United States	
Win	4–0	Ian Wolf	Submission (rear-naked choke)	MFA: There Will Be Blood	December 13, 2008	1	0:35	Miami, Florida, United States	
Win	3–0	Ralph Acosta	TKO (punches)	G-Force Fights: Bad Blood 1	November 6, 2008	1	1:00	Miami, Florida, United States	
Win	2–0	Tyler Weathers	Decision (unanimous)	Warpath	September 27, 2008	3	5:00	Albuquerque, New Mexico, United States	
Win	1–0	Steven Nelson	Submission (guillotine choke)	Crazy Horse Fights	December 11, 2007	2	3:52	Fort Lauderdale, Florida, United States	
