= Rolles Gracie Jr. =

Brazilian Jiu-Jitsu practitioner and mixed martial artist

Rolles Gracie
- Born: July 14, 1978 (age 48); Rio de Janeiro, Brazil
- Nationality: Brazilian-American
- Height: 6 ft 4 in (193 cm)
- Weight: 249 lb (113 kg; 17 st 11 lb)
- Division: Heavyweight
- Reach: 80 in (203 cm)
- Style: Brazilian Jiu-Jitsu, Judo, Gaidojutsu, Wrestling
- Stance: Orthodox
- Fighting out of: Holmdel, New Jersey, United States
- Team: Renzo Gracie Jiu-Jitsu Academy; Jackson's Submission Fighting
- Rank: 5th degree black belt in Brazilian Jiu-Jitsu (under Daniel Gracie and Renzo Gracie); 3rd dan black belt in Judo

Mixed martial arts record
- Total: 12
- Wins: 8
- By knockout: 1
- By submission: 7
- Losses: 4
- By knockout: 4

Other information
- Notable relatives: Gracie Family
- Mixed martial arts record from Sherdog

Rolles Gracie Jr.
Medal record

Grappling

Representing Brazil

ADCC Submission Wrestling World Championship
Silver medal – second place	2007 New Jersey, USA	99 kg

Rolles Gracie (born July 14, 1978) is a Brazilian professional mixed martial artist, Brazilian Jiu-Jitsu practitioner, and professional wrestler. As the son of Rolls Gracie, he is a third generation martial arts member of the Gracie family, and a 5th degree black belt in Brazilian Jiu-Jitsu.

== Mixed martial arts career ==
Gracie stepped into the International Fight League for his first MMA fight on the undercard of the IFL World Team Championships in 2007. He joined his cousin Renzo Gracie's New York Pitbulls in the IFL. Gracie's younger brothers Igor and Gregor are also mixed martial artists. Gracie was set to fight Ricardo Romero at Ring of Combat 24, April 17, 2009, but he withdrew from the fight a week before due to an injury sustained in practice.

Gracie signed with Art of War Fighting Championship and made his debut on May 23, 2009, where he defeated in a mixed martial match Magomedbag Agaev from Daghestan at 5:09 seconds in Round 1. Rolles, in his second fight for the Art of War FC promotion, defeated K-1 kickboxing veteran, but at the time 0–2 in MMA, Peter Graham early in the first round.

=== Ultimate Fighting Championship ===
Gracie was expected to make his UFC debut on February 6, 2010, in Las Vegas, Nevada against Mostapha Al-Turk Due to Mostapha Al Turk having visa troubles, Gracie instead faced Joey Beltran in his UFC debut. Gracie secured a takedown early, and managed to take Beltran's back. However he would quickly become exhausted, and Beltran would defend the rest of his takedowns with ease. In the second round, Gracie attempted another takedown but was denied, and Beltran immediately started landing ground and pound which Gracie was unable to defend, causing referee Herb Dean to stop the fight.

Following the defeat, Renzo Gracie described Rolles' performance as "embarrassing", saying his exhaustion was caused by nerves and the pressure he put on himself. Rolles was released from the UFC after just one fight.

=== Post-UFC ===
Gracie was to face Mike Ciesnolevicz at a Shine Fights event on January 8, 2011. The event, however, did not materialize.

Instead, Gracie made his first post-UFC appearance on April 22, 2011, at UCC 4: Supremacy. He defeated Braden Bice via submission in the first round.

=== ONE Fighting Championship ===
On December 8, 2011, it was announced that Gracie had signed for Asian promotion ONE Fighting Championship.

He made his debut at ONE FC: Battle of Heroes in Jakarta, Indonesia on February 11, 2012, where he took on Bob Sapp. Gracie won the fight in the first round by submission due to strikes.

Rolles faced Tony Bonello in a Heavyweight bout at ONE FC: Pride of a Nation in Quezon City, Philippines. He won via submission in the third round.

=== World Series of Fighting ===
Gracie was set to take on Dave Huckaba at WSOF 3 on June 14, 2013. However Gracie was forced out of the fight due to a wrist injury.

In his promotion debut, Gracie faced Derrick Mehmen on WSOF 5 on September 14, 2013, at World Series of Fighting 5: Arlovski vs. Kyle, where he was knocked out in the second round after outboxing Mehmen in the first.

=== KSW ===
After signing with the Polish MMA promotion KSW, Gracie challenged Karol Bedorf for the KSW Heavyweight Championship at KSW 28 on October 4, 2014. He lost the fight by TKO in the first round.

He then faced former Polish strongman and five-time World's Strongest Man winner Mariusz Pudzianowski at KSW 31 on May 23, 2015. Gracie lost in surprising fashion by KO after Pudzianowski landed a punch just 27 seconds into the first round.

== Professional wrestling career ==
Rolles made his professional wrestling debut on New Year's Eve 2012 for Inoki Genome Federation when he defeated Yusuke Kawaguchi in Tokyo, Japan. On October 14, 2013, Rolles, along with Daniel Gracie, made an appearance for professional wrestling promotion New Japan Pro-Wrestling (NJPW) at the King of Pro-Wrestling pay-per-view, issuing an open challenge for the January 4, 2014, Wrestle Kingdom 8 in Tokyo Dome event, which was later answered by Yuji Nagata and Kazushi Sakuraba, the latter known as the "Gracie Hunter" for his MMA bouts with members of the Gracie family. The Gracies lost the match via disqualification, after Daniel choked Nagata out with his gi. A rematch between the two teams took place on February 11 at The New Beginning in Osaka and saw Rolles submit Sakuraba for the win. On April 6 at Invasion Attack 2014, the Gracies defeated Takashi Iizuka and Toru Yano in another tag team match. The Gracies' win streak continued on May 3 at Wrestling Dontaku 2014, where they defeated Sakuraba and Shinsuke Nakamura. On May 25 at Back to the Yokohama Arena, Rolles wrestled his first singles match, where he was defeated by Sakuraba.

== Personal life ==
Gracie is the eldest son of Rolls Gracie (1951–1982), and grandson of Carlos Gracie (1902–1994). He is the older brother of Igor Gracie and Gregor Gracie. Gracie lives in New Jersey where he is the main instructor at his cousin Renzo Gracie’s jiu-jitsu school in Middletown, New Jersey. He also owns and operates the Rolles Gracie Academy in Old Bridge, New Jersey and West Long Branch, NJ. He has a son and three daughters.

== Achievements ==
Submission Grappling

- 2005 ADCC World Championship participant
- (silver) ADCC World Champion (2007)

Brazilian Jiu-Jitsu

- (gold) No-Gi American National Super Heavyweight Champion (2010)
- (silver) No-Gi Pan-American 2nd Place (2008)
- (gold) 3× Pan-American Champion (1996, 2000, 2006)
- Ranked #1 North America (2005)
- (gold) Grapplers Quest Copa Atlantica (2005)
- Brazilian Teams Champion (2000)
- (bronze) 3rd Place, World Championship (1999)
- (gold) 2× Brazilian National Champion (1996, 1999)
- (silver) 2nd Place, World Jiu-Jitsu Championships (1998) (defeated by Carlos "Carlão" Santos)
- (gold) 3× Rio de Janeiro State Champion (1989, 1991, 1993)

Judo

- (gold) Sunshine States Games (1998) *Novice Division
- (gold) Miami Dade Open (1998)

== Mixed martial arts record ==
Professional record breakdown
12 matches	8 wins	4 losses
By knockout	1	4
By submission	7	0
By decision	0	0
Draws	0	
No contests	0	

Res.	Record	Opponent	Method	Event	Date	Round	Time	Location	Notes
Loss	8–4	Mariusz Pudzianowski	KO (punch)	KSW 31: Materla vs. Drwal	May 23, 2015	1	0:27	Gdańsk, Poland	
Loss	8–3	Karol Bedorf	TKO (body kick and punches)	KSW 28: Fighters Den	October 4, 2014	1	4:04	Szczecin, Poland	For the KSW Heavyweight Championship.
Loss	8–2	Derrick Mehmen	KO (punch)	WSOF 5	September 14, 2013	2	2:40	Atlantic City, New Jersey, United States	
Win	8–1	Yusuke Kawaguchi	Submission (arm-triangle choke)	Inoki Bom-Ba-Ye 2012	December 31, 2012	1	2:00	Tokyo, Japan	
Win	7–1	Tony Bonello	Submission (rear-naked choke)	ONE FC: Pride of a Nation	August 31, 2012	3	1:33	Quezon City, Philippines	
Win	6–1	Bob Sapp	TKO (submission to punches)	ONE FC: Battle of Heroes	February 11, 2012	1	1:18	Jakarta, Indonesia	
Win	5–1	Lee Mein	Submission (arm-triangle choke)	Wreck MMA: Unfinished Business	October 28, 2011	1	1:51	Gatineau, Quebec, Canada	
Win	4–1	Braden Bice	Submission (arm-triangle choke)	UCC 4: Supremacy	April 22, 2011	1	1:05	Morristown, New Jersey, United States	
Loss	3–1	Joey Beltran	TKO (punches)	UFC 109	February 6, 2010	2	1:31	Las Vegas, Nevada, United States	
Win	3–0	Peter Graham	Submission (arm-triangle choke)	Art of War 14: Ground Zero	September 26, 2009	1	1:43	Macau, China	
Win	2–0	Baga Agaev	Submission (rear-naked choke)	Art of War 12: Invincible	May 23, 2009	1	5:09	Beijing, China	
Win	1–0	Sam Holloway	Submission (rear-naked choke)	IFL – 2007 Team Championship Final	September 20, 2007	1	1:49	Hollywood, Florida, United States	
