= Derrick Mehmen =

American mixed martial arts fighter

- Born: Derrick Mehmen; May 30, 1985 (age 41); Cedar Rapids, Iowa, U.S.
- Other names: Caveman
- Height: 6 ft 3 in (191 cm)
- Weight: 237 lb (108 kg; 16 st 13 lb)
- Division: Light Heavyweight; Heavyweight
- Reach: 78 in (198 cm)
- Stance: Orthodox
- Fighting out of: Cedar Rapids, Iowa, United States
- Team: Hard Drive Mixed Martial Arts, American Top Team
- Years active: 2006-present

Mixed martial arts record
- Total: 29
- Wins: 19
- By knockout: 11
- By submission: 2
- By decision: 6
- Losses: 10
- By knockout: 2
- By submission: 2
- By decision: 6

Other information
- University: Ellsworth Community College; University of Iowa
- Mixed martial arts record from Sherdog

Derrick Mehmen (born May 30, 1985) is an American professional mixed martial artist currently competing in the Heavyweight division for the Titan Fighting Championships. A professional competitor since 2006, Mehmen has also made appearances in Strikeforce, Bellator, and World Series of Fighting.

== Background ==
Mehmen was a two-time conference wrestling champion for Denver High School in his hometown of Denver, Iowa, placing fourth in the state meet as a junior. He later became an NJCAA All-American at Ellsworth Community College, placing fifth in the 2007 national meet before transferring to the University of Iowa, where he continued to compete in collegiate wrestling after originally signing a letter of intent to compete for South Dakota State University. Mehmen majored in communication studies.

== Mixed martial arts career ==
=== Bellator MMA ===
Mehmen made his Bellator debut against David Branch and lost via submission in the second round.

=== Strikeforce ===
Mehmen made his Strikeforce debut against Roy Jones and won via unanimous decision. He next fought Gian Villante at Strikeforce: Barnett vs. Cormier and lost via unanimous decision.

=== World Series of Fighting ===
On June 17, 2013, it was announced that Mehmen signed a contract with World Series of Fighting where Mehmen has competed as a Heavyweight.

Mehmen fought Rolles Gracie Jr. in a Heavyweight bout on September 14, 2013, at World Series of Fighting 5: Arlovski vs. Kyle Mehmen won the bout with a one punch knockout in the second round.

Mehmen fought against Scott Barrett at World Series of Fighting 8: Gaethje vs. Patishnock on January 18, 2014. Mehmen won the bout via unanimous decision.

Mehmen faced Dave Huckaba at World Series of Fighting 10: Branch vs. Taylor on June 21, 2014. He won the fight via unanimous decision.

Mehmen faced Smealinho Rama for the inaugural WSOF Heavyweight Championship at World Series of Fighting 14: Ford vs. Shields on October 11, 2014. He lost the fight via TKO in the first round.

Mehmen challenged Blagoy Ivanov for the WSOF Heavyweight Championship at World Series of Fighting 24: Fitch vs. Okami on October 17, 2015. He lost the fight via TKO in the second round.

== Personal life ==
Mehmen is married and has a daughter. divorced and has a second daughter

== Championships and accomplishments ==
- Inside MMA
  - Bazzie Award for KO Punch of the Year (2013) vs. Rolles Gracie, Jr.

== Mixed martial arts record ==
Professional record breakdown
29 matches	19 wins	10 losses
By knockout	11	2
By submission	2	2
By decision	6	6

Res.	Record	Opponent	Method	Event	Date	Round	Time	Location	Notes
Loss	19–10	Mikhail Mokhnatkin	Decision (unanimous)	Fight Nights Global 75: Deák vs. Chistyakov	October 6, 2017	3	5:00	Saint Petersburg, Russia	
Loss	19–9	Alexei Kudin	Decision (split)	Fight Nights Global 64: Nam vs. Bagautinov	April 28, 2017	3	5:00	Moscow, Russia	
Loss	19–8	D.J. Linderman	Decision (unanimous)	Titan FC 40	August 5, 2016	3	5:00	Coral Gables, Florida, United States	
Loss	19–7	Blagoy Ivanov	TKO (punches)	WSOF 24	October 17, 2015	2	4:33	Mashantucket, Connecticut, United States	For the WSOF Heavyweight Championship.
Win	19–6	Brett Rogers	Decision (unanimous)	Abu Dhabi Warriors 2	March 26, 2015	3	5:00	Abu Dhabi, United Arab Emirates	
Loss	18–6	Smealinho Rama	TKO (punches)	WSOF 14	October 11, 2014	1	0:51	Edmonton, Alberta, Canada	For the inaugural WSOF Heavyweight Championship.
Win	18–5	Dave Huckaba	Decision (unanimous)	WSOF 10	June 21, 2014	3	5:00	Las Vegas, Nevada, United States	
Win	17–5	Scott Barrett	Decision (unanimous)	WSOF 8	January 18, 2014	3	5:00	Hollywood, Florida, United States	
Win	16–5	Rolles Gracie Jr.	KO (punch)	WSOF 5	September 14, 2013	2	2:40	Atlantic City, New Jersey, United States	Heavyweight debut.
Win	15–5	Louis DeWerdt	Decision (unanimous)	Pinnacle Combat 13	May 3, 2013	3	5:00	Dubuque, Iowa, United States	
Win	14–5	Patrick Harman	Submission (rear-naked choke)	Pinnacle Combat 11	November 30, 2012	1	4:20	Dubuque, Iowa, United States	
Win	13–5	John Reed	TKO (punches)	Iowa Challenge 71	October 6, 2012	1	1:12	Cedar Rapids, Iowa, United States	
Loss	12–5	Gian Villante	Decision (unanimous)	Strikeforce: Barnett vs. Cormier	May 19, 2012	3	5:00	San Jose, California, United States	
Loss	12–4	Rodney Wallace	Decision (unanimous)	WMMA 1: Fighting for a Better World	March 31, 2012	3	5:00	El Paso, Texas, United States	
Win	12–3	Roy Jones	Decision (unanimous)	Strikeforce Challengers: Gurgel vs. Duarte	August 12, 2011	3	5:00	Las Vegas, Nevada, United States	
Win	11–3	Matt Thompson	Decision (unanimous)	Fight Time 4: MMA Heavyweight Explosion	April 1, 2011	3	5:00	Fort Lauderdale, Florida, United States	
Loss	10–3	Gareth Joseph	Decision (split)	World Extreme Fighting 45	January 22, 2011	3	5:00	Jacksonville, Florida, United States	
Win	10–2	Chase Waldon	TKO (punches)	Brutaal: Fight Night	June 19, 2010	1	1:14	Red Wing, Minnesota, United States	
Win	9–2	Demetrius Richards	TKO (punches)	The Cage Inc: Battle at the Border 5	May 15, 2010	1	4:09	Hankinson, North Dakota, United States	
Loss	8–2	David Branch	Submission (rear-naked choke)	Bellator 15	April 22, 2010	2	0:26	Uncasville, Connecticut, United States	Catchweight of 190 lbs.
Win	8–1	Eric Poling	TKO (punches)	Soldiers of Fortune 1	November 7, 2009	1	2:50	Coralville, Iowa, United States	
Win	7–1	Todd Monaghan	TKO (punches)	Mainstream MMA: Mehmen vs. Monaghan	August 22, 2009	1	1:33	Dubuque, Iowa, United States	
Win	6–1	Kyle Davis	Submission (choke)	Brutaal Fight Night: David and Goliath	April 11, 2009	3	0:42	Ames, Iowa, United States	
Win	5–1	Lamar Coleman	TKO (punches)	Brutaal Fight Night: March Badness	March 6, 2009	1	2:00	Maplewood, Minnesota, United States	
Loss	4–1	Mike Ciesnolevicz	Submission (guillotine choke)	Adrenaline MMA 2: Miletich vs. Denny	December 11, 2008	1	1:46	Moline, Illinois, United States	
Win	4–0	Karl Kelly	TKO (punches)	Mainstream MMA 10: Reloaded	September 13, 2008	1	N/A	Dubuque, Iowa, United States	
Win	3–0	Rashad Brooks	TKO (punches)	Mainstream MMA 9: New Era	April 5, 2008	1	N/A	Cedar Rapids, Iowa, United States	
Win	2–0	Pete Staranko	TKO (punches)	Mainstream MMA 5: Heavy Duty	February 10, 2007	1	N/A	Cedar Rapids, Iowa, United States	
Win	1–0	Jeremy Norwood	TKO (punches)	Iowa Challenge 30	September 9, 2006	2	0:53	Waterloo, Iowa, United States	
