= World Series of Fighting 4: Spong vs. DeAnda =

World Series of Fighting MMA event in 2013

- Promotion: World Series of Fighting
- Date: August 10, 2013
- Venue: Citizens Business Bank Arena
- City: Ontario, California, United States
- Attendance: 5,709

Event chronology
| World Series of Fighting 1: Central America | World Series of Fighting 4: Spong vs. DeAnda | World Series of Fighting 5: Arlovski vs. Kyle |

World Series of Fighting 4: Spong vs. DeAnda was a mixed martial arts event held August 10, 2013 in Ontario, California, United States.

== Background ==
Tyrone Spong and Angel DeAnda were scheduled to fight at WSOF 3, However, on May 1, it was announced that Spong had been pulled from the card due to visa issues. On June 7, 2013, it was announced the bout would take place at this event.

On June 12, 2013, WSOF president Ray Sefo announced he would return to fighting at this event.

Former UFC vet Jared Papazian stepped in for the injured Joe Murphy.

Lew Polley was scheduled to face Hans Stringer in a Light Heavyweight bout on the undercard. Polley, however, showed up 32 pounds over the weight limit at the weigh ins and the bout was subsequently cancelled.

== Results ==
Main Card (NBC Sports)
| Weight class | | | | Method | Round | Time | Notes |
|---|---|---|---|---|---|---|---|
| Light Heavyweight | Tyrone Spong | def. | Angel DeAnda | Decision (unanimous) (30–27, 30–27, 29–28) | 3 | 5:00 |
| Bantamweight | Marlon Moraes | def. | Brandon Hempleman | Decision (unanimous) (30–27, 30–27, 30–27) | 3 | 5:00 |
| Lightweight | Nick Newell | def. | Keon Caldwell | Submission (guillotine choke) | 1 | 2:07 |
| Heavyweight | Dave Huckaba | def. | Ray Sefo | TKO (punches) | 2 | 4:32 |
| Lightweight | Gesias Cavalcante | def. | Tyson Griffin | TKO (punches) | 3 | 1:37 |
Preliminary Card (Sherdog.com)
| Welterweight | Gerald Harris | def. | Jorge Santiago | Decision (unanimous) (29–27, 29–27, 29–27) | 3 | 5:00 | (Note: Santiago was deducted one point in round one due to grabbing the fence.) |
| Lightweight | Lewis Gonzalez | def. | Antonio McKee | Technical Decision (unanimous) (29–28, 29–28, 29–28) | 3 | 0:43 | (Note: An accidental illegal elbow rendered McKee .) |
| Bantamweight | Jared Papazian | def. | John Robles | Decision (unanimous) (30–27, 30–27, 29–28) | 3 | 5:00 |
| Catchweight (150 lbs) | Victor Valenzuela | def. | Isaac Gutierrez | Submission (rear-naked choke) | 2 | 2:41 |

== See also ==
- World Series of Fighting
- List of WSOF champions
- List of WSOF events
