= World Series of Fighting 1: Central America =

World Series of Fighting MMA event in 2013

- Promotion: World Series of Fighting: Central America
- Date: July 27, 2013
- Venue: Nicaragua National Football Stadium
- City: Managua, Managua, Nicaragua
- Attendance: 2,500

Event chronology
World Series of Fighting 3: Fitch vs. Burkman	World Series of Fighting 1: Central America	World Series of Fighting 4: Spong vs. DeAnda

World Series of Fighting 1: Central America was a mixed martial arts event held on July 27, 2013 in Managua, Managua, Nicaragua.

== Background ==
This was the first event the World Series of Fighting event held outside the United States. The event was headlined by former WBA/WBC Welterweight champion and the former WBC light middleweight champion Ricardo Mayorga.

== Results ==
Main Card
Weight class				Method	Round	Time	Notes
Welterweight	Rene Martinez	def.	Ricardo Mayorga	Submission (guillotine choke)	1	1:39
Featherweight	Leonardo Morales	def.	Javier Umaña	Submission (triangle choke)	1	2:46
Welterweight	James Rodriguez	def.	Oscar Rizzo	TKO (punches)	1	1:26
Welterweight	Cristian Soto	def.	Jimmy Medrano	TKO (Submission to punches)	1	1:04
Lightweight	Armando Aguilar	def.	Wilmer Martinez	Decision (unanimous)	3	5:00
Bantamweight	Diego Ortiz	def.	Walter Largaespada	TKO (elbows)	1	4:19
Amateurs
Bantamweight	Lester Largaespada	Tie	Jose Reyes	Draw	3	5:00
Welterweight	Rudy Orue	def.	Jaime Doña	Submission (verbal)	1	4:26
Lightweight	Heberto Espinoza	def.	Wilman Bervis	TKO (knees)	1	2:42

== See also ==
- World Series of Fighting
- List of WSOF champions
- List of WSOF events
