= Danillo Villefort =

Brazilian mixed martial arts fighter

- Born: Danillo Villefort; August 5, 1983 (age 43); Brasília, Brazil
- Other names: Índio
- Height: 6 ft 1 in (1.85 m)
- Weight: 185 lb (84 kg; 13.2 st)
- Division: Middleweight; Welterweight
- Reach: 77.5 in (197 cm)
- Fighting out of: Pittsburgh, Pennsylvania, United States
- Team: Blackzilians
- Rank: Black belt in Judo and Brazilian Jiu-Jitsu
- Years active: 2005-present

Mixed martial arts record
- Total: 20
- Wins: 14
- By knockout: 5
- By submission: 5
- By decision: 4
- Losses: 6
- By knockout: 4
- By decision: 2

Other information
- Notable relatives: Yuri Villefort, brother
- Mixed martial arts record from Sherdog

Danillo Villefort (born August 5, 1983) is a Brazilian professional mixed martial artist. Villefort has fought for the UFC, WEC, IFL, World Series of Fighting, and Professional Fighters League fighting in their Middleweight division.

== Biography ==
Villefort was born in Brazil, he was raised in competition, being the son of Vale Tudo legend Francisco "Master Indio" Silva. He was also the god-son of Antônio Rodrigo Nogueira. Villefort is a black belt in Brazilian Jiu-jitsu and has been doing Judo for over 30 years. Villefort is a founder and was a Judo MMA with the Blackzilians for over 6 years. In 2016 Villefort got bronze medal at the Judo Veterans World Championships in Fort Lauderdale. In 2017 Villefort became Champion at Judo US open at the light heavy weight division.

=== World Extreme Cagefighting ===
Villefort was set to face Jake Rosholt but Rosholt came down with an injury, the fight would have to be postponed. The WEC then disbanded their middleweight division. Villefort dropped down to 170 and took a fight at WEC 38. He defeated Mike Campbell by TKO in the first round. After the win, the WEC disbanded the welterweight division, Villefort's contract was picked up by the UFC.

In an interview conducted with FightLockdown prior to his UFC debut, Villefort stated, “The greatest moment [of my career] would have to be when I was in the IFL, when I fought Mike Massenzio. At the time I had only recently opened up my first gym and wasn't training enough for that fight. Everyone was saying Massenzio was “gonna kill me”, but I believed in God, in my Judo, and in my Jiu-Jitsu skills, accepted the fight and I did what I did. Massenzio is very strong guy!”

When asked about his post-fight celebration which entails firing an invisible arrow at his opponents, Villefort stated that "it is just a way to do tribute for my Dad, he deserves more than that, but when I shoot the arrow I make him happy!”

=== Ultimate Fighting Championship ===
Villefort made his debut for the Ultimate Fighting Championship at UFC 101 against Jesse Lennox. He lost by TKO from a cut, controversial as it was from an accidental headbutt. After the loss, he was released by the UFC.

=== Post-Zuffa ===
After being released by the UFC, Villefort signed with upstart promotion, Shine Fights. He was rumored to be fighting Nick Thompson at Shine Fights 3: Worlds Collide, however, the fight never materialized and the event was canceled.

When Drew McFedries was forced to pull out of his bout with Joey Villaseñor at Shark Fights 13, Villefort stepped in for McFedries on short notice. The bout was contested in the middleweight division, a weight class higher than Villefort's normal weight class. He won via unanimous decision.

Villefort next fought Matt Horwich at Shark Fights 14: Horwich vs. Villefort on March 11 and won the fight by unanimous decision 30-27 on all three of the judges scorecards. In the first round he landed three takedowns and good leg kicks. In the second round, Villefort landed a back elbow which opened a gash under the eye of Horwich and the third round was a similar affair to the first two.

=== Strikeforce ===
Villefort was slated to fight Antwain Britt at Strikeforce Challengers 16 in June 2011, but both fighters had to drop out due to injury. He instead fought Nate James at Strikeforce Challengers: Gurgel vs. Duarte on August 12, 2011, in Las Vegas. He lost the other controversial fight via unanimous decision.

=== World Series of Fighting ===
Villefort made his WSOF debut at World Series of Fighting 2 against UFC vet Kris McCray. He won by split decision.

On May 16, 2013, WSOF announced a 4-man tournament to crown an Inaugural Middleweight Champion. Villefort along with former UFC vets Jesse Taylor, David Branch, and current MFC middleweight champion Elvis Mutapčić will be competing in the tournament. Villefort took on David Branch in the opening round at WSOF 5. He lost the fight via unanimous decision.

== Mixed martial arts record ==
Professional record breakdown
20 matches	15 wins	5 losses
By knockout	6	3
By submission	5	0
By decision	4	2

Res.	Record	Opponent	Method	Event	Date	Round	Time	Location	Notes
Loss	15–6	Abusupiyan Magomedov	TKO (front kick to the body and punches)	PFL 3 (2018)	July 5, 2018	1	3:37	Washington, D.C., United States	
Win	15–5	Thiago Rela	TKO (punches and elbows)	Final Fight Championship 24	June 3, 2016	3	1:04	Daytona Beach, Florida, United States	
Loss	14–5	David Branch	Decision (unanimous)	WSOF 5	September 14, 2013	3	5:00	Atlantic City, New Jersey, United States	WSOF Middleweight Tournament Semifinal.
Win	14–4	Kris McCray	Decision (split)	WSOF 2	March 23, 2013	3	5:00	Atlantic City, New Jersey, United States	
Loss	13–4	Nate James	Decision (unanimous)	Strikeforce Challengers: Gurgel vs. Duarte	August 12, 2011	3	5:00	Las Vegas, Nevada, United States	
Win	13–3	Matt Horwich	Decision (unanimous)	Shark Fights 14	March 11, 2011	3	5:00	Lubbock, Texas, United States	
Win	12–3	Joey Villaseñor	Decision (unanimous)	Shark Fights 13	September 11, 2010	3	5:00	Amarillo, Texas, United States	
Win	11–3	Cassiano Ricardo Castanho de Freitas	KO (punch)	Bitetti Combat MMA 6	February 25, 2010	1	0:56	Brasília, Brazil	Welterweight bout.
Win	10–3	John Bryant	TKO (punches)	C3 Fights: Slammin Jammin Weekend 2	October 30, 2009	1	2:50	Red Rock, Oklahoma, United States	Return to Middleweight.
Loss	9–3	Jesse Lennox	TKO (doctor stoppage)	UFC 101	August 8, 2009	3	3:37	Philadelphia, Pennsylvania, United States	
Win	9–2	Mike Campbell	TKO (punches)	WEC 38	January 25, 2009	1	3:53	San Diego, California, United States	Welterweight debut.
Win	8–2	Mike Massenzio	Submission (kneebar)	International Fight League: Connecticut	May 16, 2008	1	3:25	Uncasville, Connecticut, United States	
Win	7–2	Brennan Kamaka	Submission (punches)	Pacific Xtreme Combat 14	March 10, 2008	1	N/A	Mangilao, Guam	
Win	6–2	Todd Carney	TKO (punches)	WFC 5	October 26, 2007	2	1:31	Tampa, Florida, United States	
Win	5–2	Clayton McKinney	Submission (kimura)	Harmful Intent Promotions 1	July 14, 2007	1	3:37	Fort Myers, Florida, United States	
Loss	4–2	Todd Carney	TKO (punches)	Absolute FC 19	October 21, 2006	3	2:29	Boca Raton, Florida, United States	
Loss	4–1	Rafael Natal	TKO (punches)	Gold Fighters Championship 1	May 20, 2006	1	N/A	Rio de Janeiro, Brazil	
Win	4–0	Frodi Hansen	Submission (rear naked choke)	Jungle Fight 6	April 14, 2006	2	0:50	Manaus, Brazil	
Win	3–0	Ricardo Dinamite	TKO (knee and punches)	Minotauro Fights 2	August 5, 2005	1	1:52	Salvador, Brazil	
Win	2–0	Alexandre Lima	Decision (unanimous)	Minotauro Fights 1	May 21, 2005	3	5:00	Salvador, Brazil	
Win	1–0	Roberto Bispo Silva	Submission (armbar)	Conquista Fight 2	April 2, 2005	1	4:21	Vitória da Conquista, Brazil	Middleweight debut.
