= Lac de Villefort =

Lake in Lozère, France

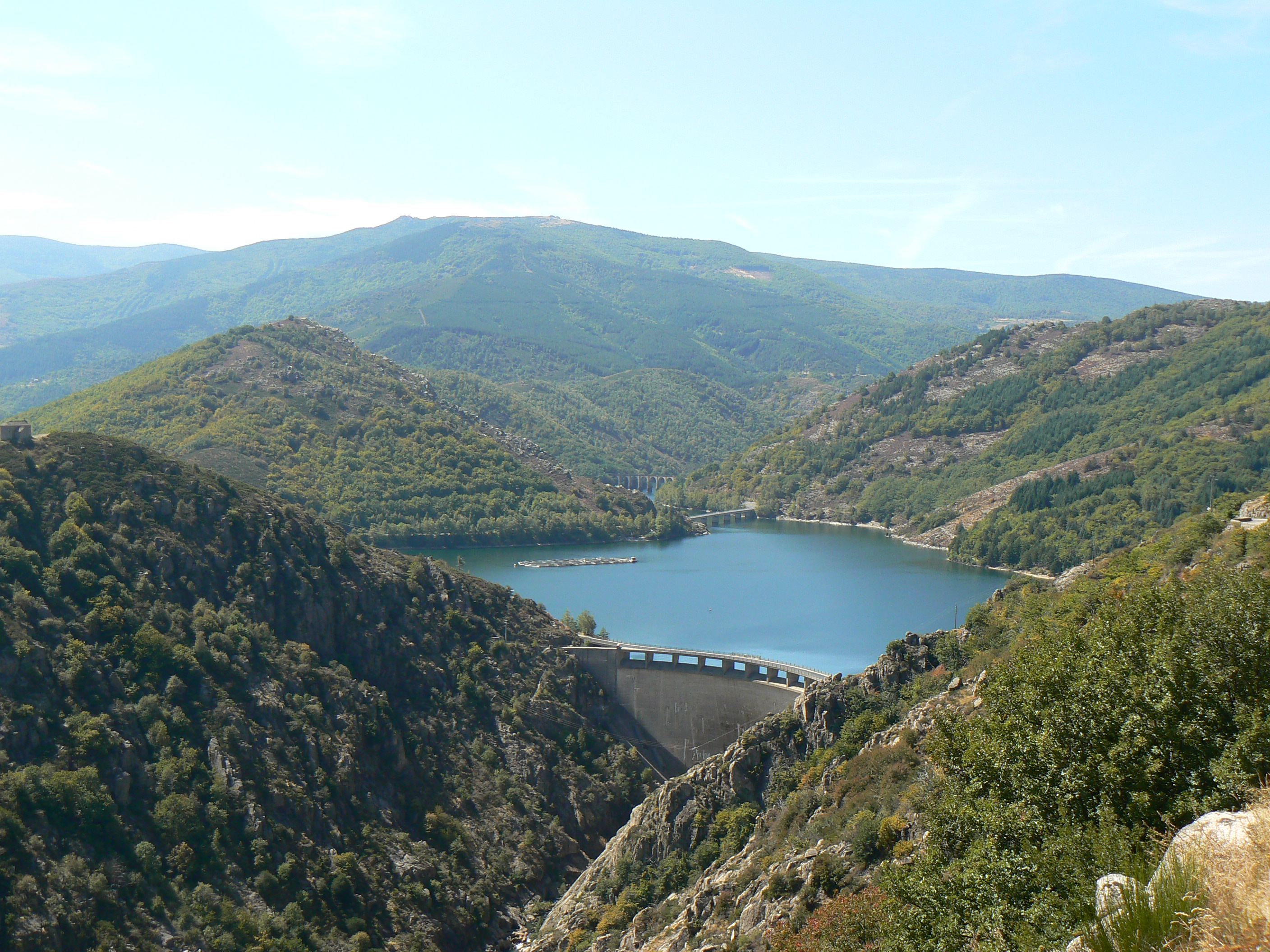

- Location within France
- Location: Lozère
- Coordinates: 44°27′9″N 3°55′41″E
- Type: artificial
- Primary inflows: Altier, Chassezac
- Basin countries: France
- Surface area: 1.27 km^{2} (0.49 sq mi)
- Max. depth: 75 m (246 ft)
- Water volume: 37,500,000 m^{3} (1.32×10^{9} cu ft)
- Surface elevation: 580 m (1,900 ft)

Lac de Villefort is a lake in Lozère, France. At an elevation of 580 m, its surface area is 1.27 km².
