= Jesse Taylor =

American mixed martial arts fighter

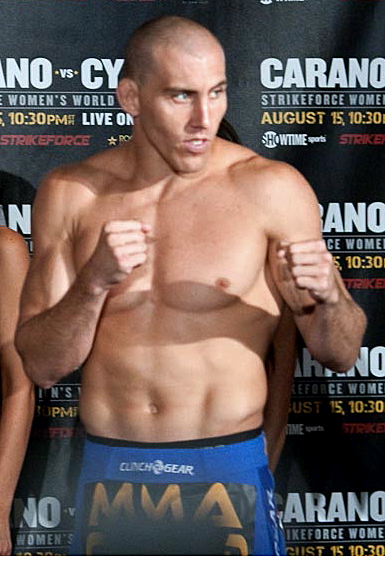
- Taylor in 2009
- Born: Jesse Taylor; January 2, 1983 (age 43); Poway, California, U.S.
- Other names: JT Money
- Height: 6 ft 1 in (1.85 m)
- Weight: 170 lb (77 kg; 12 st)
- Division: Middleweight (2006–2023); Welterweight (2008–2019); Light Heavyweight (2011, 2024 - present)
- Reach: 73 1/2 in (187 cm)
- Fighting out of: Murrieta, California, U.S.
- Team: Team Quest; The Arena MMA
- Rank: Black belt in Brazilian Jiu-Jitsu
- Wrestling: NCAA Division I Wrestling
- Years active: 2006–still active

Mixed martial arts record
- Total: 51
- Wins: 33
- By knockout: 6
- By submission: 18
- By decision: 9
- Losses: 18
- By knockout: 1
- By submission: 16
- By decision: 1

Other information
- University: San Francisco State University, Cal State Fullerton
- Notable school: Poway High School
- Mixed martial arts record from Sherdog

Jesse Taylor (born January 2, 1983) is an American professional mixed martial arts (MMA) and 10th Planet Brazilian Jiu Jitsu black belt fighter who last competed in the Welterweight division. A professional competitor since 2006, he was a cast member of SpikeTV's The Ultimate Fighter 7, winning his entry, preliminary, quarterfinal and semi-final matches, and then became infamous for being the only fighter to ever be removed from finals due to events that occurred after filming was completed. Taylor later won The Ultimate Fighter: Redemption Welterweight Tournament, and has also fought for top promotions such as UFC, Strikeforce, DREAM, MFC, AFC, Impact FC, Shark Fights, Cage Warriors and Absolute Championship Berkut.

== Background ==
Jesse Taylor also known as "JT Money", graduated Poway High School where he was a wrestler. After high school Jesse attended San Francisco State university. He took Jiu-Jitsu classes but decided to stick to wrestling. When things did not work out in San Francisco he moved back down to San Diego, where he then attended Palomar College near San Diego. In junior college, Taylor became a two-time JC All-American, CCCAA State runner-up in 2003, and crowned California Junior College State Champion in 2004, only losing three matches. Taylor was then rewarded with a scholarship to Cal State Fullerton. After the birth of his son, it became harder for Taylor to concentrate on Wrestling and school while adjusting to the family life. Taylor still managed to qualify for the Division 1 NCAA Tournament and was 3rd in the Pac-10's. He was also college teammates with 2x UFC champion TJ Dillashaw at Cal State-Fullerton.

After realizing there was no money in wrestling after college (a sentiment echoed by many former collegiate wrestlers, including Matt Hughes, Randy Couture, and Bobby Lashley), Taylor tried to think of a way to still compete and make a living for him and his son. He then decided to give mixed martial arts a real try. An old wrestling friend of his invited him for a Team Quest workout, where Taylor was able to spar with fighters such as Dan Henderson, Rameau Thierry Sokoudjou, and Jason Miller. He picked up Jiu Jitsu quickly, and worked to improve his striking. After only about a month of training, Taylor took a fight against a much more established fighter and was victorious. A few years later Jesse got the chance to be on the seventh season of the hit reality television series The Ultimate Fighter

== Mixed martial arts career ==
=== The Ultimate Fighter ===
In the second episode Jesse Taylor won his entry match against Nick Rossborough by rear naked choke. After all entry matches were done the teams were to pick the fighters that they wanted. Taylor was picked sixth overall by Forrest Griffin. With Quinton Jackson getting the first pick for fighters, Griffin was to choose the first preliminary fight. Griffin chose Taylor to take on Mike Dolce; In the second round, Taylor won the fight again via a rear naked choke. Taylor's quarterfinal fight was against Dante Rivera, which Taylor also won, this time via unanimous decision. Taylor had now advanced to the semi-finals against his close friend Tim Credeur, a fight which Taylor won by unanimous decision, putting him into the finals.

=== Removal from finale ===
Taylor was removed from the finals after a security recording was presented to Dana White. He was shown kicking out one of the side windows of a rented limousine. The staff of the hotel where the incident occurred reported that a drunken Taylor had frightened female patrons and confronted hotel security by acting aggressively and screaming that he was a UFC fighter. White told Taylor that this type of behavior was unacceptable, and that he believed Taylor did not possess the mental discipline to deal with the pressures of fame and popularity that being in the UFC would put on him. White told Taylor that because of his actions he had forfeited his place in the final match, a decision that an emotional Taylor did not try to protest. However, White went on to thank Taylor for his efforts in the show, and advised him to "go home, get your life together, call me in a few months". Later, in the July fight promo footage for UFC: Silva vs. Irvin, White recounted a conversation he had with Taylor:

He told me, "I'm in AA now. I've totally got my life together. It's the biggest mistake I've ever made. And I'll never do it again, I'll never disappoint you or the UFC again." And I believed what he said, so, I'm bringing him back.

— Dana White, UFC president

=== UFC career ===
Following his removal from The Ultimate Fighter, Taylor was offered a fight against C. B. Dollaway at UFC Fight Night: Silva vs. Irvin on July 19, 2008. He lost the fight via a Peruvian necktie submission in the first round. On July 29 the Wrestling Observer reported that Taylor had been released from the UFC.

=== Post UFC ===
In his first fight since his release from the UFC, Taylor fought Drew Fickett at a catchweight of 175 pounds. Taylor upset the more experienced Fickett, winning by TKO due to strikes in 1 minutes and 42 seconds. After the fight, Taylor then dropped down from middleweight to welterweight.

He later fought on January 15, where he was set to fight unbeaten Pat Minihan, instead Taylor fought Rico Altamirano, he defeated Altamirano via rear naked choke in the second round. Taylor fought on February 14, 2009, in Daytona Beach, Florida. He was set to go up against Esteban Ramos. Taylor ended up fighting and beating (1-0) fighter Gert Kocani. Taylor again won via rear naked choke in the second round.

Jesse fought on March 28, 2009, in Colorado. He took on Chris Camozzi, defeating him by decision. Jesse won the King of Champions belt held by Camozzi. On May 2, 2009, Taylor defeated MMA veteran Eric DaVila at Shark Fight 4. Taylor then won his sixth straight fight since being released from the UFC after defeating Rubén Darío at Total Combat 33. The fight was for the Total Combat middleweight title.

=== DREAM ===
One day after his win over Darío, Taylor was offered a fight for Japan promotion, DREAM. He made his debut on July 20, 2009, at DREAM 10 against Korean Judoka, Yoon Dong-sik. Taylor won after Yoon injured his ankle and was not able to continue.

=== Strikeforce ===
Nick Diaz was slated to face Jay Hieron for the Welterweight Championship belt. However, Diaz missed a pre-fight drug test mandated by the California State Athletic Commission and was denied a license to compete. Diaz was replaced by Taylor, who moved down to welterweight, and the fight was changed to a non-title bout. Taylor lost the match via unanimous decision.

Taylor had his second fight for the Strikeforce promotion on November 6, 2009, on the main card of the Strikeforce Challengers: Gurgel vs. Evangelista event. He lost to Luke Rockhold (5-1) in a middleweight contest.

=== Maximum Fighting Championship ===
Taylor signed a two-fight deal with Canadian-based promotion, Maximum Fighting Championship. His first fight was on the MFC 25 card against Thales Leites, losing in the first round by submission.

Before taking another fight with the MFC, Taylor fought former UFC middleweight champion Murilo Bustamante. In the second round of the fight, referee John McCarthy stood the pair up and as the fight was about to continue, Bustamante seemingly lost equilibrium and could not continue, giving Taylor the TKO victory.

His second fight for MFC took place on the main card of the MFC 26 card against Tom Watson. Taylor won via unanimous decision (30-26, 30-26, 30-26).

=== Independent promotions ===
Taylor was signed to fight Australian knockout artist, Dylan Andrews, at the inaugural Australian Fighting Championship event. The fight took place in Melbourne on November 12, 2010. Taylor won the fight midway into round one, choking Andrews unconscious from a guillotine choke.

Taylor was scheduled to fight PRIDE FC, UFC, and DREAM veteran, Denis Kang at Battlefield Fight League 7. Kang later pulled out of the fight, and Jesse moved up to Light Heavyweight to fight Clay Davidson, defeating him in a unanimous decision. The fight with Kang was rescheduled for May 28, 2011, at Battlefield Fight League 8. Taylor won by submission in the first round, getting Kang in a rear naked choke.

Taylor fought Bellator Middleweight champion Héctor Lombard on September 3, 2011, in the main event at the Australian Fighting Championships.

Taylor replaced an injured Paulo Filho at KSW XVII and faced Mamed Khalidov. He lost the fight via kneebar submission early in the first round.

=== Cage Warriors ===
Taylor faced Judo black belt Gaël Grimaud on May 24, 2012, in Isa Town, Bahrain at Cage Warriors Fight Night 6 for Grimaud's welterweight championship. Taylor dominated the first two rounds by utilizing his wrestling to take Grimaud down and control him throughout the round while also peppering Grimaud with short strikes. Early in the third round Grimaud took Taylor's back. As Taylor was attempting to escape back control, Grimaud trapped Taylor's arm and transitioned to an armbar, forcing Taylor to submit and thus retaining his welterweight title.

On December 31, 2012, Taylor defeated former champion Chris Fields in Fields's hometown of Dublin, Ireland at Cage Warriors 51 to win the CWFC middleweight title.

Just two months removed from winning the Cage Warriors middleweight title, Taylor fought The Ultimate Fighter 3 winner, Kendall Grove. The fight was for Taylor's K-OZ Entertainment middleweight title he had won back in November 2012. The contest took place on February 23, 2013, in Perth, Western Australia. Taylor controlled the fight for five consecutive rounds, winning the fight via unanimous decision, and defending his middleweight title.

Taylor had his first Cage Warriors Middleweight title defense on May 4, 2013, on the Cage Warriors 54 card. Taylor fought, and defeated, "The White Tyson" John Phillips via submission early in the first round.

=== World Series of Fighting ===
A few weeks after his first successful Cage Warriors title defense, it was announced Taylor had signed an exclusive deal with the World Series of Fighting. Taylor would take part in the promotion's four-man middleweight tournament set to determine the first WSOF middleweight champion. Besides Taylor, the participants were Elvis Mutapčić, David Branch and Danillo Villefort.

Taylor was expected to fight Elvis Mutapčić in the opening round at WSOF 5. The New Jersey Athletic Commission cancelled the fight after seeing Mutapcic take an unknown and unapproved medication backstage before the fight. The fight was rescheduled for WSOF 7. Taylor won the fight via unanimous decision.

In the Middleweight tournament final, Taylor faced David Branch at World Series of Fighting 10 on June 21, 2014. He lost the fight via D'arce choke submission in the first round.

=== Battlegrounds ===
Taylor fought in the BattleGrounds MMA in a Single Night 8-Man Tournament on October 3, 2014. He lost his quarterfinal fight against Trey Houston via submission in the first round.

=== Arena Tour 6 ===
Taylor had an upcoming fight against fellow UFC veteran Maiquel Falcao for Argentinian mma promotion Arena Tour on April 18, 2015. Taylor lost the fight against Falcao by guillotine choke in the first round at 3:13.

=== League S-70 ===
Taylor fought Michail Tsarev on August 29, 2015, at League S-70: Russia vs. World. He won the fight via Submission (guillotine choke).

=== Absolute Championship Berkut ===
Taylor lost in the first fight in the ACB lost to Aslambek Saidov at the ACB 40: Battleground on June 3, 2016, via submission (guillotine choke) in the first round.

Taylor faced Mukhamed Berkhamov on October 22, 2016, at ACB 48. He lost the fight via submission (armbar) in the first round.

Taylor had been expected to face Guillerme Martinez on January 13, 2017, at ACB 51 but Martinez instead faced Ivan Castillo.

=== The Ultimate Fighter: Redemption ===
On February 15 it was announced that Taylor would be joining the cast of Season 25 of The Ultimate Fighter.

During team picks in episode one Taylor joined team Dillashaw as T.J. Dillashaw's second pick, after former UFC Fighter James Krause. In episode 3, Taylor faced former training partner Mehdi Baghdad and won by unanimous decision to advance to the quarter-finals. He next faced Hayder Hassan and won the bout via submission in the first round. Taylor faced James Krause in the semi-finals and won via submission in the third round to advance to the finals.

=== UFC return ===
Nine years after his first stint on the show, Taylor fought Dhiego Lima in the finals on July 7, 2017, at The Ultimate Fighter: Redemption Finale. Taylor won the fight via rear-naked choke submission in the second round.

Taylor was expected to face Belal Muhammad on November 19, 2017, at UFC Fight Night 121. However on September 13, it was announced that Taylor was pulled from the card after being notified by USADA of a potential doping violation. He was flagged after an out-of-competition drug test conducted August 22. On October 13, USADA officially suspended Taylor one year for testing positive for anti-estrogen agent clomiphene.

One month after the suspension was lifted, Taylor was released from his UFC contract.

=== Post UFC ===
Taylor went 2-1 on the regional scene, losing via first-round guillotine choke against Mukhamed Berkhamov at ACA 100 and then rebounding against fellow UFC vet Seth Baczynski at NWFA 1: Retribution and Daniel McWilliams at J Street Fights 2, submitting both with a rear-naked choke. He was booked against reigning champion Christian Leroy Duncan at Cage Warriors 148 for the CWFC Middleweight Championship on December 31, 2022, however he was involved in a hit and run the day before the event and had to pull out of the bout.

Taylor faced Jared Revel for the BFL Middleweight Championship on March 30, 2023, at BFL 76, getting submitted in the first round via triangle choke.

== Personal life ==
Taylor has two sons and a daughter. Before becoming a professional fighter, Taylor worked various jobs, including construction and personal training.

== Championships and accomplishments ==
- Cage Warriors Fighting Championship
  - CWFC Middleweight Championship (One time)
  - One successful title defense
- K-Oz Entertainment Fights
  - K-Oz Entertainment Middleweight Championship (One time; current)
  - One successful title defense
- King of Champions
  - King of Champions Middleweight Championship (One time)
- Total Combat
  - Total Combat Middleweight Championship (One time)
- Ultimate Fighting Championship
  - Winner of The Ultimate Fighter: Redemption (2017)
  - Most wins on The Ultimate Fighter (7-0)

== Mixed martial arts record ==
Professional record breakdown
51 matches	33 wins	18 losses
By knockout	6	1
By submission	18	16
By decision	9	1

Res.	Record	Opponent	Method	Event	Date	Round	Time	Location	Notes
Loss	33–18	Elizeu Zaleski dos Santos	TKO (punches)	Liga Monstro Combate 1	June 6, 2026	1	1:24	Curitiba, Brazil	For the inaugural LMC Welterweight Championship.
Loss	33–17	Jared Revel	Submission (triangle choke)	Battlefield Fight League 76	March 30, 2023	1	4:00	Vancouver, British Columbia, Canada	For the BFL Middleweight Championship.
Win	33–16	Daniel McWilliams	Submission (rear-naked choke)	J Street Fights 2	November 13, 2021	1	0:28	Bentonville, Arkansas, United States	Return to Middleweight.
Win	32–16	Seth Baczynski	Submission (rear-naked choke)	North West Fighting Alliance 1	August 28, 2021	1	0:46	Bentonville, Arkansas, United States	Catchweight (195 lb) bout.
Loss	31–16	Ustarmagomed Gadzhidaudov	Submission (guillotine choke)	ACA 100	October 4, 2019	1	1:13	Grozny, Russia	
Win	31–15	Dhiego Lima	Submission (rear-naked choke)	The Ultimate Fighter: Redemption Finale	July 7, 2017	2	0:43	Las Vegas, Nevada, United States	Won The Ultimate Fighter 25 Welterweight Tournament.
Loss	30–15	Mukhamed Berkhamov	Submission (armbar)	ACB 48	October 22, 2016	1	2:30	Moscow, Russia	
Win	30–14	Seth Baczynski	Decision (unanimous)	Tru-Form Entertainment MMA: Vengeance	August 26, 2016	3	5:00	Anaheim, California, United States	
Loss	29–14	Aslambek Saidov	Submission (guillotine choke)	ACB 40	June 3, 2016	1	3:29	Krasnodar, Russia	
Loss	29–13	Borys Mańkowski	Submission (guillotine choke)	KSW 32	October 31, 2015	1	3:02	London, England	For the KSW Welterweight Championship.
Win	29–12	Michail Tsarev	Submission (guillotine choke)	League S-70: Russia vs. World	August 29, 2015	1	0:40	Sochi, Russia	
Win	28–12	Nick Barnes	Technical Submission (rear-naked choke)	Smash Global: The Main Event	August 1, 2015	1	2:59	San Diego, California, United States	Return to Welterweight.
Loss	27–12	Maiquel Falcão	Submission (guillotine choke)	Arena Tour 5	April 18, 2015	1	3:13	Buenos Aires, Argentina	
Loss	27–11	Trey Houston	Submission (armbar)	BattleGrounds MMA 5	October 4, 2014	1	2:10	Tulsa, Oklahoma, United States	BattleGrounds MMA Welterweight Tournament Quarterfinal.
Loss	27–10	David Branch	Submission (brabo choke)	WSOF 10	June 21, 2014	1	1:41	Las Vegas, Nevada, United States	WSOF Middleweight Tournament Final. For the inaugural WSOF Middleweight Championship.
Win	27–9	Elvis Mutapčić	Decision (unanimous)	WSOF 7	December 7, 2013	3	5:00	Vancouver, British Columbia, Canada	WSOF Middleweight Tournament Semifinal.
Win	26–9	John Phillips	Submission (guillotine choke)	Cage Warriors 54	May 4, 2013	1	2:43	Cardiff, Wales	Defended the Cage Warriors Middleweight Championship.
Win	25–9	Kendall Grove	Decision (unanimous)	K-Oz Entertainment: Bragging Rights 5	February 23, 2013	5	5:00	Perth, Western Australia	Defended the K-Oz Middleweight Championship.
Win	24–9	Chris Fields	Submission (rear-naked choke)	Cage Warriors 51	December 31, 2012	2	1:06	Dublin, Ireland	Won the Cage Warriors Middleweight Championship.
Win	23–9	Steve Kennedy	Submission (rear-naked choke)	K-Oz Entertainment: Bragging Rights 4	November 16, 2012	1	4:01	Perth, Australia	Won the vacant K-Oz Middleweight Championship.
Win	22–9	Marcel Fortuna	Decision (unanimous)	Dragon House MMA 11	August 18, 2012	3	5:00	Oakland, California, United States	
Win	21–9	Christopher Ortega	Submission (guillotine choke)	Cage Gladiator 7	August 4, 2012	1	1:13	Mexicali, Mexico	
Loss	20–9	Gaël Grimaud	Submission (armbar)	Cage Warriors: Fight Night 6	May 24, 2012	3	0:55	Isa Town, Bahrain	For the Cage Warriors Welterweight Championship.
Loss	20–8	Mamed Khalidov	Submission (kneebar)	KSW 17	November 26, 2011	1	1:42	Łódź, Poland	Catchweight (187.4 lb) bout; Khalidov missed weight.
Win	20–7	Mario Trujillo	Submission (rear-naked choke)	Panama Fight League: Ultimate Combat Challenge 7	September 30, 2011	1	1:30	Panama City, Panama	
Loss	19–7	Héctor Lombard	Submission (heel hook)	Australian FC 2	September 3, 2011	2	1:26	Melbourne, Australia	Return to Middleweight. For the inaugural AFC Middleweight Championship.
Win	19–6	Denis Kang	Submission (rear-naked choke)	Battlefield Fight League 8	May 28, 2011	1	1:57	Nanaimo, British Columbia, Canada	
Win	18–6	Clay Davidson	Decision (unanimous)	Battlefield Fight League 7	March 26, 2011	3	5:00	Nanaimo, British Columbia, Canada	Light Heavyweight debut.
Win	17–6	Dylan Andrews	Technical Submission (guillotine choke)	Australian FC 1	November 12, 2010	1	2:33	Melbourne, Australia	
Win	16–6	Tom Watson	Decision (unanimous)	MFC 26	September 10, 2010	3	5:00	Brandon, Manitoba, Canada	
Win	15–6	Murilo Bustamante	TKO (retirement)	Impact FC 2	July 18, 2010	2	2:10	Sydney, Australia	
Loss	14–6	Thales Leites	Submission (triangle choke)	MFC 25	May 7, 2010	1	2:27	Edmonton, Alberta, Canada	
Win	14–5	Jason Day	Submission (rear-naked choke)	Aggression MMA 2	February 5, 2010	1	1:14	Edmonton, Alberta, Canada	
Loss	13–5	Luke Rockhold	Submission (rear-naked choke)	Strikeforce Challengers: Gurgel vs. Evangelista	November 6, 2009	1	3:42	Fresno, California, United States	
Loss	13–4	Jay Hieron	Decision (unanimous)	Strikeforce: Carano vs. Cyborg	August 15, 2009	3	5:00	San Jose, California, United States	Welterweight bout.
Win	13–3	Yoon Dong-sik	TKO (ankle injury)	Dream 10	July 20, 2009	1	1:02	Saitama, Japan	
Win	12–3	Rubén Barboza	Submission (rear-naked choke)	Total Combat 33	July 11, 2009	1	3:13	Mexico City, Mexico	Won the Total Combat Middleweight Championship.
Win	11–3	Eric Davila	Submission (rear-naked choke)	Shark Fights 4	May 2, 2009	1	2:29	Lubbock, Texas, United States	
Win	10–3	Chris Camozzi	Decision (unanimous)	King of Champions: Shockwave 2009	March 28, 2009	3	5:00	Denver, Colorado, United States	Return to Middleweight. Won the KOC Middleweight Championship.
Win	9–3	Gert Kocani	Submission (rear-naked choke)	Xtreme Cagefighting Federation: Rumble in Racetown 1	February 14, 2009	2	4:45	Daytona Beach, Florida, United States	
Win	8–3	Rico Altamirano	Submission (rear-naked choke)	The Warriors Cage 1	January 15, 2009	2	2:00	Porterville, California, United States	
Win	7–3	Drew Fickett	TKO (punches and elbows)	Total Combat 32	October 2, 2008	1	1:42	El Cajon, California, United States	Welterweight debut.
Loss	6–3	C. B. Dollaway	Submission (Peruvian necktie)	UFC Fight Night: Silva vs. Irvin	July 19, 2008	1	3:58	Las Vegas, Nevada, United States	
Win	6–2	Jorge Ramirez	TKO (punches)	MMA Xtreme 15	November 16, 2007	1	0:42	Mexico City, Mexico	
Win	5–2	Matt Major	Decision (unanimous)	Melee on the Mountain 2	November 6, 2007	3	5:00	Friant, California, United States	
Loss	4–2	Kenny Ento	Submission (triangle choke)	Primal MMA: The Next Level	August 11, 2007	1	0:37	Tijuana, Mexico	
Win	4–1	Jorge Ortiz	TKO (punches)	Total Combat 21	July 8, 2007	2	1:49	San Diego, California, United States	
Loss	3–1	Jesse Forbes	Submission (armbar)	Tuff-N-Uff 2	April 14, 2007	1	1:21	Las Vegas, Nevada, United States	
Win	3–0	Noel Rodriguez	Submission (rear-naked choke)	MMA Xtreme 9	March 3, 2007	2	1:03	Tijuana, Mexico	
Win	2–0	Chris Chiasson	TKO (punches)	No Limits: Annihilation	November 4, 2006	2	1:28	San Clemente, California, United States	
Win	1–0	Robert Sarkozi	Decision (unanimous)	KOTC: Rapid Fire	August 4, 2006	2	5:00	San Jacinto, California, United States	Middleweight debut.

Exhibition record breakdown		
7 matches	7 wins	0 losses
By submission	4	0
By decision	3	0

Res.	Record	Opponent	Method	Event	Date	Round	Time	Location	Notes
Win	7–0	James Krause	Technical Submission (guillotine choke)	The Ultimate Fighter 25	July 5, 2017 (airdate)	3	2:32	Las Vegas, Nevada, United States	Semi-finals.
Win	6–0	Hayder Hassan	Submission (rear-naked choke)	The Ultimate Fighter 25	June 21, 2017 (airdate)	1	2:24	Las Vegas, Nevada, United States	Quarter-finals.
Win	5–0	Mehdi Baghdad	Decision (unanimous)	The Ultimate Fighter 25	May 3, 2017 (airdate)	2	5:00	Las Vegas, Nevada, United States	Preliminary bout.
Win	4–0	Tim Credeur	Decision (unanimous)	The Ultimate Fighter 7	June 11, 2008 (airdate)	3	5:00	Las Vegas, Nevada, United States	Semi-finals.
Win	3–0	Dante Rivera	Decision (unanimous)	The Ultimate Fighter 7	May 28, 2008 (airdate)	2	5:00	Las Vegas, Nevada, United States	Quarter-finals.
Win	2–0	Mike Dolce	Submission (rear-naked choke)	The Ultimate Fighter 7	April 16, 2008 (airdate)	2	1:47	Las Vegas, Nevada, United States	Preliminary bout.
Win	1–0	Nick Rossborough	Submission (rear-naked choke)	The Ultimate Fighter 7	April 9, 2008 (airdate)	1	1:50	Las Vegas, Nevada, United States	Elimination bout.

== See also ==
- List of male mixed martial artists
- List of current UFC fighters
