= Elvis Mutapčić =

American mixed martial arts fighter

- Born: July 19, 1986 (age 40); Sarajevo, Bosnia and Herzegovina
- Other names: The King
- Nationality: Bosnian; American
- Height: 6 ft 0 in (1.83 m)
- Weight: 185 lb (84 kg; 13 st 3 lb)
- Division: Light heavyweight Middleweight; Welterweight
- Reach: 72 in (183 cm)
- Fighting out of: Des Moines, Iowa, United States
- Team: Roundkick Gym
- Years active: 2007–present

Mixed martial arts record
- Total: 23
- Wins: 16
- By knockout: 7
- By submission: 6
- By decision: 3
- Losses: 6
- By knockout: 2
- By decision: 4
- Draws: 1

Other information
- Mixed martial arts record from Sherdog

Elvis Mutapčić (born July 19, 1986) is a Bosnian-American former mixed martial artist who competed in the Middleweight and the Light Heavyweight division of the Ultimate Fighting Championship (UFC).

== Mixed martial arts career ==
=== Early career ===
Mutapčić compiled a professional mixed martial arts record of 13-2 winning various regional titles before signing for World Series of Fighting in April 2013.

=== World Series of Fighting ===
In April 2013, Mutapčić signed a multi-fight deal with World Series of Fighting.

Mutapčić was expected to make his WSOF debut against Jesse Taylor at WSOF 5. The New Jersey Athletic Commission cancelled the fight after seeing someone from Mutapcic’s camp take an unknown and unapproved medication backstage before the fight. The fight was rescheduled for WSOF 7. He lost the fight via unanimous decision.

Mutapčić then faced Kelvin Tiller on August 9, 2014 at WSOF 12. He won the fight via unanimous decision.

=== Ultimate Fighting Championship ===
Mutapčić made his UFC debut at light heavyweight on January 17, 2016 as a late-notice opponent against Francimar Barroso at UFC Fight Night: Dillashaw vs. Cruz. He lost the fight via unanimous decision.

Mutapčić then moved to middleweight and faced Kevin Casey on June 4, 2016 at UFC 199. The fight ended in a split draw.

Mutapčić then faced Anthony Smith on December 3, 2016, at The Ultimate Fighter 24 Finale. He lost the fight via TKO in the second round.

In February 2017, Mutapčić was released from the UFC.

== Championships and accomplishments ==
- Maximum Fighting Championship
  - MFC Middleweight Championship
    - One successful defence
- Midwest Cage Championship
  - MCC Middleweight Championship

== Mixed martial arts record ==
Professional record breakdown
23 matches	16 wins	6 losses
By knockout	7	2
By submission	6	0
By decision	3	4
Draws	1	

Res.	Record	Opponent	Method	Event	Date	Round	Time	Location	Notes
Win	16–6–1	Brian Imes	TKO (punches)	Midwest Cage Championship 65	June 26, 2021	1	4:34	West Des Moines, Iowa, United States	Return to Light Heavyweight.
Loss	15–6–1	Beslan Isaev	KO (punches)	ACB 61: Balaev vs. Bataev	May 20, 2017	1	0:33	St. Petersburg, Russia	Welterweight bout.
Loss	15–5–1	Anthony Smith	TKO (elbow and punches)	The Ultimate Fighter: Tournament of Champions Finale	December 3, 2016	2	3:27	Las Vegas, Nevada, United States	
Draw	15–4–1	Kevin Casey	Draw (split)	UFC 199	June 4, 2016	3	5:00	Inglewood, California, United States	Return to Middleweight.
Loss	15–4	Francimar Barroso	Decision (unanimous)	UFC Fight Night: Dillashaw vs. Cruz	January 17, 2016	3	5:00	Boston, Massachusetts, United States	
Win	15–3	Sean Huffman	Submission (punches)	MCC 59: Howser vs. O’Brien	June 19, 2015	1	2:53	Des Moines, Iowa, United States	Light Heavyweight debut.
Win	14–3	Kelvin Tiller	Decision (unanimous)	WSOF 12: Palomino vs. Gonzalez	August 9, 2014	3	5:00	Las Vegas, Nevada, United States	Catchweight (195 lb) bout
Loss	13–3	Jesse Taylor	Decision (unanimous)	WSOF 7: Karakhanyan vs. Palmer	December 7, 2013	3	5:00	Vancouver, British Columbia, Canada	
Win	13–2	Sam Alvey	Decision (unanimous)	MFC 36: Reality Check	February 15, 2013	5	5:00	Edmonton, Alberta, Canada	Defended the MFC Middleweight Championship.
Win	12–2	Joseph Henle	TKO (leg kick)	MFC 35: Explosive Encounter	October 26, 2012	3	1:45	Edmonton, Alberta, Canada	Won the vacant MFC Middleweight Championship.
Win	11–2	Jacen Flynn	TKO (punches)	MFC 34: Total Recall	August 10, 2012	1	1:39	Edmonton, Alberta, Canada	
Win	10–2	Keenan Curry	Submission (armbar)	MCC 39: Domination	March 2, 2012	2	2:57	Des Moines, Iowa, United States	Won the MCC Middleweight title
Win	9–2	Cezar Ferreira	KO (punch)	Superior Cage Combat 2	August 20, 2011	1	0:25	Las Vegas, Nevada, United States	
Loss	8–2	Artenas Young	Decision (unanimous)	SF 16: Neer vs. Juarez	June 25, 2011	3	5:00	Odessa, Texas, United States	
Win	8–1	Josh Rosaaen	Submission (guillotine choke)	MCC 30: Thanksgiving Throwdown 3	November 24, 2010	1	4:50	Des Moines, Iowa, United States	
Win	7–1	Zak Cummings	Decision (unanimous)	MCC 27: Mutapcic vs. Cummings	June 11, 2010	5	5:00	Des Moines, Iowa, United States	
Win	6–1	Brett Stevens	Submission (heel hook)	MCC 25: Inferno	March 13, 2010	1	1:29	Des Moines, Iowa, United States	
Win	5–1	Mike Van Meer	TKO (punches)	MCC 23: Thanksgiving Throwdown 2	November 25, 2009	2	0:21	Des Moines, Iowa, United States	
Win	4–1	Carlos Newborn	Submission (triangle choke)	RCC 10: Devil’s Fight	October 30, 2009	1	0:43	Iowa, United States	
Loss	3–1	Andy Branson	Decision (split)	MCC 21: Mickle vs. Marriott	June 26, 2009	3	5:00	Des Moines, Iowa, United States	
Win	3–0	Evan Marks	TKO (punches)	MCC 19: The Return	March 14, 2009	1	4:55	Des Moines, Iowa, United States	
Win	2–0	Thad England	TKO (submission to punches)	MCC 10: Vengeance	September 29, 2007	1	2:59	Des Moines, Iowa, United States	
Win	1–0	Mark Gearhart	Submission (rear-naked choke)	MCC 10: Vengeance	September 29, 2007	1	0:43	Des Moines, Iowa, United States	Middleweight debut.

== See also ==
- List of male mixed martial artists
